= List of FK Partizan seasons =

Fudbalski klub Partizan is a professional football club based in Belgrade, Serbia. The club was formed in 1945.

== Seasons ==
Results of league and cup competitions by season
Season	Division	Pld	W	D	L	GF	GA	Pts	Pos	Cup	International	Player(s)	Goals	Notes
Season	League									Cup	International	Top goalscorer(s)		
1946–47	(Socialist Federal Republic of Yugoslavia) First League	26	23	1	2	77	17	47	1st	Winners	–	(Socialist Federal Republic of Yugoslavia) Stjepan Bobek	25	
1947–48	(Socialist Federal Republic of Yugoslavia) First League	18	10	4	4	46	22	24	3rd	Runners-up	–	(Socialist Federal Republic of Yugoslavia) Prvoslav Mihajlović	18	
1948–49	(Socialist Federal Republic of Yugoslavia) First League	18	14	1	3	39	14	29	1st	Semi-finals	–	(Socialist Federal Republic of Yugoslavia) Stjepan Bobek	16	
1949–50	(Socialist Federal Republic of Yugoslavia) First League	18	12	2	4	46	19	26	3rd	Semi-finals	–	(Socialist Federal Republic of Yugoslavia) Marko Valok	20	
1950–51	(Socialist Federal Republic of Yugoslavia) First League	22	10	4	8	34	24	24	4th	Quarter-finals	–	(Socialist Federal Republic of Yugoslavia) Stjepan Bobek	15	
1951–52	(Socialist Federal Republic of Yugoslavia) First League	16	9	1	6	41	26	19	6th	Winners	–	(Socialist Federal Republic of Yugoslavia) Stjepan Bobek	25	
1952–53	(Socialist Federal Republic of Yugoslavia) First League	22	11	3	8	58	36	25	3rd	Quarter-finals	–	(Socialist Federal Republic of Yugoslavia) Marko Valok	21	
1953–54	(Socialist Federal Republic of Yugoslavia) First League	26	18	5	3	77	30	41	2nd	Winners	–	(Socialist Federal Republic of Yugoslavia) Stjepan Bobek	26	
1954–55	(Socialist Federal Republic of Yugoslavia) First League	26	12	6	8	58	36	30	5th	did not compete	–	(Socialist Federal Republic of Yugoslavia) Stjepan Bobek	24	
1955–56	(Socialist Federal Republic of Yugoslavia) First League	26	14	7	5	65	35	35	2nd	not held	European Cup – Quarter-finals	(Socialist Federal Republic of Yugoslavia) Miloš Milutinović	21	1st season of the UEFA competitions
1956–57	(Socialist Federal Republic of Yugoslavia) First League	26	10	6	10	51	45	26	4th	Winners	–	(Socialist Federal Republic of Yugoslavia) Marko Valok	14	
1957–58	(Socialist Federal Republic of Yugoslavia) First League	26	13	7	6	46	33	33	2nd	Semi-finals	–	(Socialist Federal Republic of Yugoslavia) Branislav Mihajlović	20	
1958–59	(Socialist Federal Republic of Yugoslavia) First League	22	14	3	5	39	29	31	2nd	Runners-up	–	(Socialist Federal Republic of Yugoslavia) Branislav Mihajlović	13	
1959–60	(Socialist Federal Republic of Yugoslavia) First League	22	11	5	6	49	29	27	3rd	Runners-up	–	(Socialist Federal Republic of Yugoslavia) Milan Galić	16	
1960–61	(Socialist Federal Republic of Yugoslavia) First League	22	15	2	5	53	23	32	1st	Round of 16	–	(Socialist Federal Republic of Yugoslavia) Milan Galić	16	
1961–62	(Socialist Federal Republic of Yugoslavia) First League	22	13	5	4	42	22	31	1st	Round of 32	European Cup – First round	(Socialist Federal Republic of Yugoslavia) Vladica Kovačević	16	
1962–63	(Socialist Federal Republic of Yugoslavia) First League	26	16	8	2	58	22	40	1st	Round of 32	European Cup – Preliminary round	(Socialist Federal Republic of Yugoslavia) Milan Galić	18	
1963–64	(Socialist Federal Republic of Yugoslavia) First League	26	9	8	9	34	26	26	5th	Semi-finals	European Cup – Quarter-finals	(Socialist Federal Republic of Yugoslavia) Vladica Kovačević	28	
1964–65	(Socialist Federal Republic of Yugoslavia) First League	28	19	5	4	62	34	43	1st	Round of 16	–	(Socialist Federal Republic of Yugoslavia) Vladica Kovačević (Socialist Federal Republic of Yugoslavia) Milan Galić	16	
1965–66	(Socialist Federal Republic of Yugoslavia) First League	30	10	8	12	45	47	28	11th	Round of 16	European Cup – Runners-up	(Socialist Federal Republic of Yugoslavia) Mustafa Hasanagić	20	
1966–67	(Socialist Federal Republic of Yugoslavia) First League	30	14	10	6	52	28	38	3rd	Semi-finals	–	(Socialist Federal Republic of Yugoslavia) Mustafa Hasanagić	21	
1967–68	(Socialist Federal Republic of Yugoslavia) First League	30	15	8	7	45	31	38	2nd	Round of 16	Inter-Cities Fairs Cup – Second round	(Socialist Federal Republic of Yugoslavia) Josip Pirmajer	10	
1968–69	(Socialist Federal Republic of Yugoslavia) First League	34	13	14	7	55	40	40	3rd	Semi-finals	–	(Socialist Federal Republic of Yugoslavia) Idriz Hošić (Socialist Federal Republic of Yugoslavia) Ilija Katić	12	
1969–70	(Socialist Federal Republic of Yugoslavia) First League	34	16	12	6	47	27	44	2nd	Round of 16	Inter-Cities Fairs Cup – First round	(Socialist Federal Republic of Yugoslavia) Ilija Katić	10	
1970–71	(Socialist Federal Republic of Yugoslavia) First League	34	14	10	10	44	34	38	5th	First round	Inter-Cities Fairs Cup – First round	(Socialist Federal Republic of Yugoslavia) Momčilo Vukotić	12	
1971–72	(Socialist Federal Republic of Yugoslavia) First League	34	15	9	10	41	35	39	5th	did not compete	–	(Socialist Federal Republic of Yugoslavia) Nenad Bjeković	15	
1972–73	(Socialist Federal Republic of Yugoslavia) First League	34	16	11	7	50	37	43	4th	Round of 16	–	(Socialist Federal Republic of Yugoslavia) Nenad Bjeković	13	
1973–74	(Socialist Federal Republic of Yugoslavia) First League	34	12	13	9	41	33	37	4th	Round of 32	–	(Socialist Federal Republic of Yugoslavia) Nenad Bjeković	16	
1974–75	(Socialist Federal Republic of Yugoslavia) First League	34	13	10	11	55	49	36	6th	not held	UEFA Cup – Third round	(Socialist Federal Republic of Yugoslavia) Boško Đorđević	21	
1975–76	(Socialist Federal Republic of Yugoslavia) First League	34	22	6	6	60	30	50	1st	Round of 16	–	(Socialist Federal Republic of Yugoslavia) Nenad Bjeković	24	
1976–77	(Socialist Federal Republic of Yugoslavia) First League	34	14	11	9	37	31	39	4th	Round of 16	European Cup – First round	(Socialist Federal Republic of Yugoslavia) Pavle Grubješić	13	
1977–78	(Socialist Federal Republic of Yugoslavia) First League	34	22	10	2	55	19	54	1st	Round of 32	–	(Socialist Federal Republic of Yugoslavia) Momčilo Vukotić	11	won the Mitropa Cup
1978–79	(Socialist Federal Republic of Yugoslavia) First League	34	9	11	14	39	47	29	15th	Runners-up	European Cup – First round	(Socialist Federal Republic of Yugoslavia) Slobodan Santrač	19	
1979–80	(Socialist Federal Republic of Yugoslavia) First League	34	10	12	12	31	37	32	13th	Quarter-finals	–	(Socialist Federal Republic of Yugoslavia) Zvonko Varga	10	
1980–81	(Socialist Federal Republic of Yugoslavia) First League	34	9	16	9	43	41	34	8th	Semi-finals	–	(Socialist Federal Republic of Yugoslavia) Zvonko Živković	14	
1981–82	(Socialist Federal Republic of Yugoslavia) First League	34	14	9	11	40	31	37	6th	Round of 16	–	(Socialist Federal Republic of Yugoslavia) Momčilo Vukotić (Socialist Federal Republic of Yugoslavia) Zvonko Živković (Socialist Federal Republic of Yugoslavia) Zvonko Varga	8	
1982–83	(Socialist Federal Republic of Yugoslavia) First League	34	17	11	6	58	37	45	1st	Round of 16	–	(Socialist Federal Republic of Yugoslavia) Dragan Mance	15	
1983–84	(Socialist Federal Republic of Yugoslavia) First League	34	15	12	7	43	25	42	2nd	Round of 32	European Cup – Second round	(Socialist Federal Republic of Yugoslavia) Momčilo Vukotić (Socialist Federal Republic of Yugoslavia) Dragan Mance	8	
1984–85	(Socialist Federal Republic of Yugoslavia) First League	34	14	11	9	46	34	39	3rd	Quarter-finals	UEFA Cup – Third round	(Socialist Federal Republic of Yugoslavia) Dragan Mance	17	
1985–86	(Socialist Federal Republic of Yugoslavia) First League	34	21	7	6	65	29	49	1st	Quarter-finals	UEFA Cup – Second round	(Socialist Federal Republic of Yugoslavia) Zvonko Varga	20	
1986–87	(Socialist Federal Republic of Yugoslavia) First League	34	16	11	7	58	29	43	1st	Round of 32	UEFA Cup – First round	(Socialist Federal Republic of Yugoslavia) Milko Đurovski	19	
1987–88	(Socialist Federal Republic of Yugoslavia) First League	34	17	10	7	62	37	44	2nd	Round of 32	UEFA Cup – First round	(Socialist Federal Republic of Yugoslavia) Milko Đurovski	9	
1988–89	(Socialist Federal Republic of Yugoslavia) First League	34	15	7	12	52	37	33	6th	Winners	UEFA Cup – Second round	(Socialist Federal Republic of Yugoslavia) Vladislav Đukić	14	won the Yugoslav Super Cup
1989–90	(Socialist Federal Republic of Yugoslavia) First League	34	18	4	12	51	42	37	4th	Semi-finals	Cup Winners' Cup – Quarter-finals	(Socialist Federal Republic of Yugoslavia) Milko Đurovski	17	
1990–91	(Socialist Federal Republic of Yugoslavia) First League	36	18	8	10	62	36	41	3rd	Round of 16	UEFA Cup – Third round	(Socialist Federal Republic of Yugoslavia) Predrag Mijatović	16	
1991–92	(Socialist Federal Republic of Yugoslavia) First League	33	21	10	2	59	18	46	2nd	Winners	UEFA Cup – First round	(Socialist Federal Republic of Yugoslavia) Predrag Mijatović	15	
1992–93	(Serbia and Montenegro) First League	36	31	3	2	103	20	65	1st	Runners-up		(Serbia and Montenegro) Ljubomir Vorkapić	19	
1993–94	(Serbia and Montenegro) First League	18	13	3	2	44	10	42	1st	Winners		(Serbia and Montenegro) Savo Milošević	27	In these 3 seasons, the Yugoslav First League was contested under fall and spring phases; in 1995-96, new point system was adopted - 3 points per win
1994–95	(Serbia and Montenegro) First League	18	13	2	3	43	17	38	2nd	Quarter-finals		(Serbia and Montenegro) Savo Milošević	34	In these 3 seasons, the Yugoslav First League was contested under fall and spring phases; in 1995-96, new point system was adopted - 3 points per win
1995–96	(Serbia and Montenegro) First League	18	13	3	2	51	17	60	1st	Runners-up		(Serbia and Montenegro) Dragan Ćirić	19	In these 3 seasons, the Yugoslav First League was contested under fall and spring phases; in 1995-96, new point system was adopted - 3 points per win
1996–97	(Serbia and Montenegro) First League	33	26	6	1	88	17	84	1st	First round	UEFA Cup – Qualifying round	(Serbia and Montenegro) Damir Čakar	20	
1997–98	(Serbia and Montenegro) First League	33	22	4	7	73	38	70	3rd	Winners	Champions League – First qualifying round	(Serbia and Montenegro) Dragan Isailović	20	
1998–99	(Serbia and Montenegro) First League	24	21	3	0	59	19	66	1st	Runners-up	Cup Winners' Cup – Second round	(Serbia and Montenegro) Saša Ilić	20	
1999–2000	(Serbia and Montenegro) First League	40	32	5	3	111	30	101	2nd	Round of 16	Champions League – Third qualifying round UEFA Cup – First round	(Serbia and Montenegro) Mateja Kežman	35	
2000–01	(Serbia and Montenegro) First League	34	28	2	4	94	36	86	2nd	Winners	UEFA Cup – First round	(Serbia and Montenegro) Saša Ilić	26	
2001–02	(Serbia and Montenegro) First League	34	25	6	3	85	33	81	1st	Quarter-finals	UEFA Cup – First round	(Serbia and Montenegro) Zvonimir Vukić	17	
2002–03	(Serbia and Montenegro) First League	34	29	2	3	88	36	89	1st	Quarter-finals	Champions League – Third qualifying round UEFA Cup – Second round	(Serbia and Montenegro) Zvonimir Vukić	24	
2003–04	(Serbia and Montenegro) First League	30	19	6	5	48	20	63	2nd	Semi-finals	Champions League – Group stage	(Serbia and Montenegro) Andrija Delibašić	15	
2004–05	(Serbia and Montenegro) First League	30	25	5	0	81	20	80	1st	Semi-finals	UEFA Cup – Round of 16	(Serbia and Montenegro) Saša Ilić	19	
2005–06	(Serbia and Montenegro) SuperLiga	30	22	5	3	53	17	71	2nd	Round of 16	Champions League – Third qualifying round UEFA Cup – First round	(Serbia and Montenegro) Srđan Radonjić	23	
2006–07	(Serbia) SuperLiga	32	18	3	11	47	31	57	2nd	Semi-finals	UEFA Cup – Group stage	(Serbia) Nebojša Marinković	14	
2007–08	(Serbia) SuperLiga	33	24	8	1	63	23	80	1st	Winners	UEFA Cup – First qualifying round	(Senegal) Lamine Diarra	20	
2008–09	(Serbia) SuperLiga	33	25	5	3	63	15	80	1st	Winners	Champions League – Third qualifying round UEFA Cup – Group stage	(Senegal) Lamine Diarra	22	
2009–10	(Serbia) SuperLiga	30	24	6	0	63	14	78	1st	Semi-finals	Champions League – Third qualifying round Europa League – Group stage	(Brazil) Cléo	22	
2010–11	(Serbia) SuperLiga	30	24	4	2	75	21	76	1st	Winners	Champions League – Group stage	(Brazil) Cléo	20	
2011–12	(Serbia) SuperLiga	30	26	2	2	67	12	80	1st	Semi-finals	Champions League – Third qualifying round Europa League – Play-off round	(Serbia) Zvonimir Vukić	17	
2012–13	(Serbia) SuperLiga	30	23	4	3	71	16	73	1st	Round of 16	Champions League – Third qualifying round Europa League – Group stage	(Serbia) Aleksandar Mitrović	15	
2013–14	(Serbia) SuperLiga	30	22	5	3	64	20	71	2nd	Quarter-finals	Champions League – Third qualifying round Europa League – Play-off round	(Serbia) Nemanja Kojić	8	
2014–15	(Serbia) SuperLiga	30	21	8	1	67	22	71	1st	Runners-up	Champions League – Third qualifying round Europa League – Group stage	(Serbia) Petar Škuletić	21	
2015–16	(Serbia) SuperLiga	37	20	7	10	72	44	40	2nd	Winners	Champions League – Play-off round Europa League – Group stage	(Bulgaria) Valeri Bojinov	18	
2016–17	(Serbia) SuperLiga	37	30	4	3	78	22	58	1st	Winners	Europa League – Second qualifying round	(Serbia) Uroš Đurđević	28	
2017–18	(Serbia) SuperLiga	37	23	8	6	71	33	43^{1}	2nd	Winners	Champions League – Third qualifying round Europa League – Round of 32	(Cameroon) Léandre Tawamba	19	
2018–19	(Serbia) SuperLiga	37	20	9	8	58	28	42	3rd	Winners	Europa League – Play-off round	(Cape Verde) Ricardo Gomes	26	
2019–20	(Serbia) SuperLiga	30	20	4	6	69	25	64	2nd	Runners-up	Europa League – Group stage	(Nigeria) Umar Sadiq	16	
2020–21	(Serbia) SuperLiga	38	31	2	5	95	20	95	2nd	Runners-up	Europa League – Third qualifying round	(Japan) Takuma Asano	21	
2021–22	(Serbia) SuperLiga	37	31	5	1	85	13	98	2nd	Runners-up	Europa Conference League – Round of 16	(Cape Verde) Ricardo Gomes	38	
2022–23	(Serbia) SuperLiga	37	21	8	8	68	34	71	4th	Round of 32	Europa League – Third qualifying round Europa Conference League – Knockout round play-offs	(Cape Verde) Ricardo Gomes	28	
2023–24	(Serbia) SuperLiga	37	24	6	7	80	48	78	2nd	Semi-finals	Europa Conference League – Play-off round	(Brazil) Matheus Saldanha	18	
2024–25	(Serbia) SuperLiga	37	21	10	6	73	40	73	2nd	Quarter-finals	Champions League – Second qualifying round Europa League – Third qualifying round Europa Conference League – Play-off round	(Israel) Bibars Natcho	15	
2025–26	(Serbia) SuperLiga	37	22	7	8	72	45	73	3rd	Round of 32	Europa League – First qualifying round Europa Conference League – Third qualifying round	(Serbia) Jovan Milošević	12	

^{1} The club were docked two points.
