= 1957–58 FK Partizan season =

Partizan
1957–58 season
- President: Đuro Lončarević
- Head coach: Géza Kalocsay
- Yugoslav First League: Runners-up
- Yugoslav Cup: Semi-finals

The 1957–58 season was the 12th season in FK Partizan's existence. This article shows player statistics and matches that the club played during the 1957–58 season.

== Players ==
Mačvan, JESAM

== Friendlies ==
13 November 1957 Friendly	Levski Sofia (Bulgaria)	1–1	(Socialist Federal Republic of Yugoslavia) Partizan	Sofia, Bulgaria
			Duvančić	Attendance: 25,000

24 December 1957 Friendly	Nantes (France)	1–3	(Socialist Federal Republic of Yugoslavia) Partizan	Nantes, France

26 December 1957 Friendly	Rapid Wien (Austria)	1–1	(Socialist Federal Republic of Yugoslavia) Partizan	Heerlen, Netherlands

29 December 1957 Friendly	Kickers Offenbach (West Germany)	2–1	(Socialist Federal Republic of Yugoslavia) Partizan	Offenbach am Main, West Germany

1 January 1958 Friendly	Basel (Switzerland)	1–3	(Socialist Federal Republic of Yugoslavia) Partizan	Basel, Switzerland

21 May 1958 Friendly	Hungary	1–1	(Socialist Federal Republic of Yugoslavia) Partizan	Budapest, Hungary
			Valok 17'	Attendance: 12,000

22 June 1958 Friendly	Legia Warsaw (Poland)	1–2	(Socialist Federal Republic of Yugoslavia) Partizan	Warsaw, Poland
			Vukelić; Blažić

29 June 1958 Friendly	Śląsk Wrocław (Poland)	2–3	(Socialist Federal Republic of Yugoslavia) Partizan	Wrocław, Poland
			Mihajlović; Vukelić

1 July 1958 Friendly	Poznań XI (Poland)	1–1	(Socialist Federal Republic of Yugoslavia) Partizan	Poznań, Poland
			Vukelić

== Competitions ==
=== Yugoslav First League ===
Pos	Team	Pld	W	D	L	GF	GA	GR	Pts	Qualification or relegation
1	Dinamo Zagreb (C)	26	15	7	4	53	33	1.606	37	Qualification for European Cup preliminary round
2	Partizan	26	13	7	6	46	33	1.394	33	
3	Radnički Beograd	26	11	6	9	50	38	1.316	28	
4	Red Star Belgrade	26	10	8	8	45	38	1.184	28	
5	Vojvodina	26	12	3	11	55	32	1.719	27	

Source: rsssf.org
Rules for classification: 1st points; 2nd goal average.
(C) Champions

11 August 1957 1	Zagreb	1–2	Partizan	Zagreb
			Herceg 26', 59'	Stadium: Stadion u Kranjčevićevoj; Attendance: 10,000; Referee: Stanišić (Sarajevo)

18 August 1957 2	Partizan	4–2	Spartak Subotica	Belgrade
	Valok 8', 87'; Kilijanović 42' (o.g.); Herceg 78'			Stadium: JNA Stadium; Attendance: 10,000; Referee: Vukotić (Varaždin)

25 August 1957 3	Crvena zvezda	2–2	Partizan	Belgrade
			Valok 35', 53'	Stadium: JNA Stadium; Attendance: 55,000; Referee: Liverani (Italy)

1 September 1957 4	Partizan	2–1	Velež	Belgrade
	Mihajlović 11'; Kaloperović 71' (pen.)			Stadium: JNA Stadium; Attendance: 20,000; Referee: Varaždinec (Zagreb)

8 September 1957 5	Hajduk Split	1–3	Partizan	Split
			Mesaroš 24', 53'; Kaloperović 56'	Stadium: Stadion Stari plac Attendance: 15,000; Referee: Mikulan (Zagreb)

5 October 1957 6	Partizan	1–1	BSK	Belgrade
	Kaloperović 64' (pen.)			Stadium: JNA Stadium; Attendance: 9,000

13 October 1957 7	Budućnost	2–2	Partizan	Titograd
			Mihajlović 7'; Belin 42'	Stadium: Podgorica City Stadium; Attendance: 8,000

20 October 1957 8	Partizan	4–1	Dinamo Zagreb	Belgrade
	Šikić 11' (o.g.); Kaloperović 55'; Mihajlović 64'; Belin 78'			Stadium: JNA Stadium; Attendance: 25,000; Referee: Nedelkovski (Skopje)

27 October 1957 9	Vojvodina	2–1	Partizan	Novi Sad
			Zebec 51'	Stadium: Karađorđe Stadium; Attendance: 15,000

24 November 1957 10	Split	0–1	Partizan	Split
			Mihajlović 75'	Stadium: Stadion Stari plac Attendance: 10,000; Referee: Erlich (Ljubljana)

30 November 1957 11	Partizan	0–1	Vardar	Belgrade
				Stadium: JNA Stadium; Attendance: 4,000

8 December 1957 12	Radnički Beograd	4–0	Partizan	Belgrade
				Attendance: 15,000

15 December 1957 13	Partizan	1–1	Željezničar	Belgrade
	Mihajlović 50'			Stadium: JNA Stadium; Attendance: 12,000; Referee: Kovač (Sombor)

15 February 1958 14	Partizan	3–0	Zagreb	Belgrade
	Mihajlović 52', 67'; Blažić 64'			Stadium: JNA Stadium; Attendance: 10,000; Referee: Kukanja (Murska Sobota)

23 February 1958 15	Spartak Subotica	1–2	Partizan	Subotica
			Mihajlović 21'; Kilijanović 49' (o.g.)	Stadium: Subotica City Stadium; Attendance: 7,000; Referee: Teslodžić (Osijek)

2 March 1958 16	Partizan	2–2	Crvena zvezda	Belgrade
	Mesaroš 34'; Zebec 76'			Stadium: JNA Stadium; Attendance: 35,000; Referee: Kajner (Austria)

10 March 1958 17	Velež	1–1	Partizan	Mostar
			Mihajlović 53'	Stadium: Stadion pod Bijelim Brijegom; Attendance: 10,000; Referee: Lemešić

15 March 1958 18	Partizan	5–1	Hajduk Split	Belgrade
	Mihajlović 3', 14', 39', 56'; Valok 7'			Stadium: JNA Stadium; Attendance: 15,000; Referee: Stanišić (Sarajevo)

23 March 1958 19	BSK	1–1	Partizan	Belgrade
			Zebec 26'	Stadium: JNA Stadium; Attendance: 4,000; Referee: Kostić (Beograd)

26 March 1958 20	Partizan	1–0	Budućnost	Belgrade
	Blažić 31'			Stadium: JNA Stadium; Attendance: 10,000; Referee: Rukavina (Varaždin)

30 March 1958 21	Dinamo Zagreb	1–0	Partizan	Zagreb
				Stadium: Stadion Maksimir; Attendance: 35,000; Referee: Stanišić (Sarajevo)

6 April 1958 22	Partizan	1–5	Vojvodina	Belgrade
	Mesaroš 69'			Stadium: JNA Stadium; Attendance: 20,000; Referee: Stanišić (Sarajevo)

10 April 1958 23	Partizan	2–0	Split	Belgrade
	Valok 85'; Pajević 90'			Stadium: JNA Stadium; Attendance: 15,000; Referee: Erlich (Ljubljana)

13 April 1958 24	Vardar	1–0	Partizan	Skopje
				Stadium: City Park Stadium; Attendance: 15,000; Referee: Erlich (Ljubljana)

24 April 1958 25	Partizan	1–0	Radnički Beograd	Belgrade
	Miladinović 44'			Stadium: JNA Stadium; Attendance: 5,000; Referee: Erlich (Ljubljana)

27 April 1958 26	Željezničar	1–4	Partizan	Sarajevo
			Pajević 14'; Zebec 19'; Herceg 67'; Blažić 80'	Attendance: 20,000

=== Yugoslav Cup ===
20 November 1957 Round of 32	Timok	0–1	Partizan	Zaječar
			Miladinović	Attendance: 3,000

1 February 1958 Round of 16	Partizan	11–0	Pobeda Prilep	Belgrade
	Miladinović 20', 75'; S. Čebinac 25'; Mihajlović 37', 39', 42', 72'; Laškovski 57' (o.g.); Mesaroš 69'; Kaloperović 79', 88'			Stadium: JNA Stadium; Attendance: 3,000

8 February 1958 Quarter-finals	Zagreb	1–3	Partizan	Zagreb
			Mihajlović 6', 12'; Valok 31'	Stadium: Stadion u Kranjčevićevoj; Attendance: 10,000; Referee: Petrošić (Split)

25 April 1958 Semi-finals	Partizan	2–3	Crvena zvezda	Belgrade
	Vukelić 60'; Mihajlović 69'			Stadium: JNA Stadium; Attendance: 42,000; Referee: Lemešić

=== Danube Cup ===
==== Round of 16 ====
25 May 1958 First leg	Partizan (Socialist Federal Republic of Yugoslavia)	4–2	(Czechoslovakia) Tatran Prešov	Kragujevac*, Yugoslavia
	16' (o.g.); Duvančić 18'; Rede 42'; Herceg 54'			Stadium: Čika Dača Stadium; Attendance: 12,000

1 June 1958 Second leg	Tatran Prešov (Czechoslovakia)	4–1 (6 – 5 agg.)	(Socialist Federal Republic of Yugoslavia) Partizan	Prešov, Czechoslovakia
			Kaloperović 37'	Attendance: 15,000

== See also ==
- List of FK Partizan seasons
