= 1950–51 FK Partizan season =

Partizan
1950–51 season
- Head coach: (Hungary) Illés Spitz
- Yugoslav First League: 4th
- Yugoslav Cup: Semi-finals

The 1950–51 season was the fifth season in FK Partizan's existence. This article shows player statistics and matches that the club played during the 1950–51 season.

== Players ==
=== Squad information ===
Šoštarić, Belin, Čolić, Čajkovski, Jovanović, Jakovetić, Bogojevac, Bobek, Valok, Atanacković, Herceg, Stojanović, Lazarević, Kolaković, P. Mihajlović, Zebec, Vorgić, Šijaković, Drenovac, Ančić, Srdzbadija Stanković, Stipić, Tapiška, Torbarov, Stokić, Ruman, Miloš Milutinović, Marjanović, Krajišnik, Branilović, Simonovski.

== Friendlies ==
18 February 1951 Friendly	Vardar (Socialist Federal Republic of Yugoslavia)	3–5	(Socialist Federal Republic of Yugoslavia) Partizan	Skopje
				Attendance: 15,000

17 March 1951 Friendly	1. FC Saarbrücken (Saar Protectorate)	1–2	(Socialist Federal Republic of Yugoslavia) Partizan	Saarbrücken, Saar Protectorate

18 March 1951 Friendly	Arminia Ludwigshafen (West Germany)	2–6	(Socialist Federal Republic of Yugoslavia) Partizan	Ludwigshafen, West Germany

25 March 1951 Friendly	Partizan (Socialist Federal Republic of Yugoslavia)	1–0	Austria Wien	Antwerp, Belgium
	Atanacković			Attendance: 20,000

9 May 1951 Friendly	Hull City (England)	2–3	(Socialist Federal Republic of Yugoslavia) Partizan	Kingston upon Hull, England
	38' (pen.); 58'		Bobek 26' (pen.), 36'; Zebec 51'	Stadium: Boothferry Park; Attendance: 16,000

12 May 1951 Friendly	Middlesbrough (England)	2–3	(Socialist Federal Republic of Yugoslavia) Partizan	Middlesbrough, England
	36'; 85'		Belin 26'; Herceg 65'; Bobek 71'	Stadium: Ayresome Park; Attendance: 30,000

14 May 1951 Friendly	Bradford (England)	2–0	(Socialist Federal Republic of Yugoslavia) Partizan	Bradford, England

13 June 1951 Friendly	Partizan (Socialist Federal Republic of Yugoslavia)	3–0	(Austria) Vienna	Belgrade

29 June 1951 Friendly	IFK Norrköping (Sweden)	1–2	(Socialist Federal Republic of Yugoslavia) Partizan	Norrköping, Sweden
			Bobek

1 July 1951 Friendly	Örebro SK (Sweden)	2–6	(Socialist Federal Republic of Yugoslavia) Partizan	Örebro, Sweden

3 July 1951 Friendly	Borlänge (Sweden)	1–5	(Socialist Federal Republic of Yugoslavia) Partizan	Borlänge, Sweden

6 July 1951 Friendly	Eskilstuna (Sweden)	2–4	(Socialist Federal Republic of Yugoslavia) Partizan	Eskilstuna, Sweden

8 July 1951 Friendly	Helsingborgs IF (Sweden)	6–1	(Socialist Federal Republic of Yugoslavia) Partizan	Helsingborg, Sweden
			Mihajlović 67' (pen.)

5 September 1951 Friendly	Partizan (Socialist Federal Republic of Yugoslavia)	3–2	Austria Wien	Belgrade
	Čajkovski 28'; Šijaković 71'; Bobek 75'		Stojaspal 23', 55'

== Competitions ==
=== Yugoslav First League ===
Pos	Team	Pld	W	D	L	GF	GA	GR	Pts
2	Dinamo Zagreb	22	16	3	3	45	19	2.368	35
3	Hajduk Split	22	14	4	4	52	21	2.476	32
4	Partizan	22	10	4	8	34	24	1.417	24
5	BSK Belgrade	22	8	6	8	34	24	1.417	22
6	Lokomotiva	22	7	6	9	32	34	0.941	20

Source: rsssf.org
Rules for classification: 1st points; 2nd goal average.

5 March 1951 1	Partizan	5–2	Spartak Subotica	Belgrade
	Bobek; Valok; Vorgić			Stadium: JNA Stadium; Attendance: 10,000

11 March 1951 2	Mačva Šabac	0–1	Partizan	Šabac
			Valok 8'	Attendance: 10,000

1 April 1951 3	Partizan	1–0	Borac Zagreb	Belgrade
	Jakovetić 30'			Stadium: JNA Stadium; Attendance: 8,000; Referee: Miloš Belesin

8 April 1951 4	Sarajevo	1–0	Partizan	Sarajevo
	Lovrić 58'			Attendance: 20,000; Referee: Emil Erlih

15 April 1951 5	Partizan	0–0	Dinamo Zagreb	Belgrade
				Stadium: JNA Stadium; Attendance: 40,000; Referee: Borče Nedelkovski

22 April 1951 6	BSK	1–4	Partizan	Belgrade
	Leškov 35'		Bobek 44'; Vorgić 47'; Stanković 51'; Valok 60'	Stadium: JNA Stadium; Attendance: 15,000

29 April 1951 7	Partizan	1–1	Vojvodina	Belgrade
	Bobek 40'		Hirman 15'	Stadium: JNA Stadium; Attendance: 30,000; Referee: Miljenko Podupski

27 May 1951 8	Napredak Kruševac	1–2	Partizan	Kruševac
	Vuković 75'		Belin 15'; Šijaković 54'	Attendance: 10,000; Referee: Života Vlajić

3 June 1951 9	Partizan	2–0	Lokomotiva Zagreb	Belgrade
	Bobek 74'; Belin 80'			Stadium: JNA Stadium; Attendance: 16,000; Referee: Voja Jovanović

10 June 1951 10	Hajduk Split	2–0	Partizan	Split
	Šenauer 40', 53'			Stadium: Stadion Stari plac Attendance: 18,000; Referee: Anton Marek

17 June 1951 11	Partizan	6–1	Crvena zvezda	Belgrade
	Šijaković 3'; Bobek 12', 25'; Valok 32', 66', 70'		Tomašević 52'	Stadium: JNA Stadium; Attendance: 50,000; Referee: Vasa Stefanović

5 August 1951 12	Spartak Subotica	2–1	Partizan	Subotica
	Gemeri 22', 55'		Atanacković 48'	Stadium: Subotica City Stadium; Attendance: 8,000; Referee: Borče Nedelkoski

12 August 1951 13	Partizan	0–3	Mačva Šabac	Belgrade
			Kovačević 30', 35', 87'	Stadium: JNA Stadium; Attendance: 12,000

19 August 1951 14	Borac Zagreb	2–1	Partizan	Zagreb
	Zebec 41'; Kobe 68'		Herceg 6'	Attendance: 12,000

9 September 1951 15	Partizan	1–2	Sarajevo	Belgrade
	Branilović		Konnjevod; Žigman	Stadium: JNA Stadium; Attendance: 10,000

16 September 1951 16	Dinamo Zagreb	2–0	Partizan	Zagreb
				Attendance: 30,000

23 September 1951 17	Partizan	2–2	BSK	Belgrade
	Herceg 10'; Belin 31'		Begovac 2'; Cokić 75'	Stadium: JNA Stadium; Attendance: 15,000; Referee: Vasa Stefanović

30 September 1951 18	Vojvodina	0–1	Partizan	Novi Sad
			Valok 58'	Attendance: 13,000

7 October 1951 19	Partizan	3–0	Napredak Kruševac	Belgrade
	Valok 23'; Bobek 30'; Čajkovski 75'			Stadium: JNA Stadium; Attendance: 25,000; Referee: Makiedo

20 October 1951 20	Lokomotiva Zagreb	0–3	Partizan	Zagreb
			Herceg 26'; Belin 68'; Bobek 75'	Attendance: 10,000

23 October 1951 21	Partizan	0–0	Hajduk Split	Belgrade
				Stadium: JNA Stadium; Attendance: 25,000; Referee: Miljenko Podupski

4 November 1951 22	Crvena zvezda	2–0	Partizan	Belgrade
	Tomašević 42'; Živanović 60'			Stadium: JNA Stadium; Attendance: 48,000; Referee: Vasa Stefanović

=== Yugoslav Cup ===
27 November 1950 Qualifying round	6. Oktobar	1–4	Partizan	Kikinda
			Valok; Bobek; M. Pajević	Attendance: 7,000

30 November 1950 Round of 32	Kvarner	0–1	Partizan	Rijeka
			Bobek	Attendance: 8,000

3 December 1950 Round of 16	Partizan	5–1	Proleter Osijek	Belgrade
	Bobek; B. Pajević			Stadium: JNA Stadium; Attendance: 10,000

10 December 1950 Quarter-finals	Partizan	3–0	BSK	Belgrade
	Bobek; Atanacković; M. Pajević			Stadium: JNA Stadium; Attendance: 12,000

17 December 1950 Semi-finals	Partizan	0–1	Crvena zvezda	Belgrade
				Stadium: JNA Stadium; Attendance: 50,000

== Statistics ==
=== Goalscorers ===
This includes all competitive matches.

Rank	Pos	Nat	Name	Yugoslav First League	Yugoslav Cup	Total
1	FW	(Socialist Federal Republic of Yugoslavia)	Stjepan Bobek	9	6	15
2	FW	(Socialist Federal Republic of Yugoslavia)	Marko Valok	9	2	11
3	DF	(Socialist Federal Republic of Yugoslavia)	Bruno Belin	4	0	4
4	MF	(Socialist Federal Republic of Yugoslavia)	Antun Herceg	3	0	3
5	FW	(Socialist Federal Republic of Yugoslavia)	Stevan Vorgić	2	0	2
5	DF	(Socialist Federal Republic of Yugoslavia)	Vasilije Šijaković	2	0	2
5	MF	(Socialist Federal Republic of Yugoslavia)	Aleksandar Atanacković	1	1	2
5	FW	(Socialist Federal Republic of Yugoslavia)	Milutin Pajević	0	2	2
5	MF	(Socialist Federal Republic of Yugoslavia)	Božidar Pajević	0	2	2
10	MF	(Socialist Federal Republic of Yugoslavia)	Zlatko Čajkovski	1	0	1
10	?	(Socialist Federal Republic of Yugoslavia)	Marijan Branilović	1	0	1
10	?	(Socialist Federal Republic of Yugoslavia)	Stanković	1	0	1
10	DF	(Socialist Federal Republic of Yugoslavia)	Lajoš Jakovetić	1	0	1
TOTALS				34	13	47

=== Score overview ===
Win Draw Loss

Opposition	Home score	Away score	Aggregate
Crvena zvezda	6–1	0–2	6–3
Dinamo Zagreb	0–0	0–2	0–2
Hajduk Split	0–0	0–2	0–2
BSK	2–2	4–1	6–3
Lokomotiva Zagreb	2–0	3–0	5–0
Sarajevo	1–2	0–1	1–3
Vojvodina	1–1	1–0	2–1
Borac Zagreb	1–0	1–2	2–2
Mačva Šabac	0–3	1–0	1–3
Spartak Subotica	5–2	1–2	6–4
Napredak Kruševac	3–0	2–1	5–1

== See also ==
- List of FK Partizan seasons
