= 1951–52 FK Partizan season =

Partizan
1951–52 season
- President: Bogdan Vujošević
- Head coach: Toni Pogačnik
- Yugoslav First League: 6th
- Yugoslav Cup: Quarter-finals

The 1951–52 season was the sixth season in FK Partizan's existence. This article shows player statistics and matches that the club played during the 1951–52 season.

== Friendlies ==
26 December 1951 Friendly	1. FC Köln (West Germany)	1–2	(Socialist Federal Republic of Yugoslavia) Partizan	Cologne, West Germany

1 January 1952 Friendly	Nevers XI (France)	4–5	(Socialist Federal Republic of Yugoslavia) Partizan	Nevers, France
			Valok; Atanacković; Mihajlović	Attendance: 10,000

6 January 1952 Friendly	TuS Neuendorf (West Germany)	2–3	(Socialist Federal Republic of Yugoslavia) Partizan	Koblenz, West Germany

13 April 1952 Friendly	FC St. Pauli (West Germany)	3–4	(Socialist Federal Republic of Yugoslavia) Partizan	Hamburg, West Germany

15 April 1952 Friendly	Hamburger SV (West Germany)	2–2	(Socialist Federal Republic of Yugoslavia) Partizan	Hamburg, West Germany
			Valok; Čajkovski

28 May 1952 Friendly	Partizan (Socialist Federal Republic of Yugoslavia)	8–4	(France) Lille	Belgrade
	Zebec; Valok; Čajkovski; Belin; Milutinović			Stadium: JNA Stadium; Attendance: 25,000; Referee: Vasa Stefanović

== Competitions ==
=== Yugoslav First League ===
==== Group 1 ====
Pos	Team	Pld	W	D	L	GF	GA	GD	Pts	Qualification
1	Dinamo Zagreb	10	8	0	2	27	13	+14	16	Qualification for Championship group
2	Lokomotiva	10	7	0	3	20	9	+11	14	Qualification for Championship group
3	Partizan	10	6	0	4	24	15	+9	12	Qualification for Central group
4	Vojvodina	10	5	0	5	21	15	+6	10	Qualification for Central group
5	Rabotnički	10	2	1	7	9	30	−21	5	Qualification for Relegation group
6	Mačva Šabac	10	1	1	8	10	29	−19	3	Qualification for Relegation group

Source: rsssf.org

==== Central group ====
Pos	Team	Pld	W	D	L	GF	GA	GD	Pts
5	BSK Belgrade	6	5	1	0	15	6	+9	11
6	Partizan	6	3	1	2	17	11	+6	7
7	Vardar	6	2	1	3	8	15	−7	5
8	Vojvodina	6	0	1	5	7	15	−8	1

Source: rsssf.org

2 March 1952 1	Mačva Šabac	0–1	Partizan	Šabac
			Valok 48'	Attendance: 10,000; Referee: Voja Jovanović

9 March 1952 2	Lokomotiva Zagreb	3–0	Partizan	Zagreb
	Firm 25', 48', 88'			Stadium: Stadion Maksimir; Attendance: 10,000; Referee: Leo Lemešić

16 March 1952 3	Partizan	1–0	Rabotnički	Belgrade
	Šijaković 2'			Stadium: JNA Stadium; Attendance: 15,000; Referee: Miljković

23 March 1952 4	Dinamo Zagreb	3–1	Partizan	Zagreb
	Horvat 43'; Režek 50'; Dvornić 67'		Herceg 75'	Stadium: Stadion Maksimir; Attendance: 20,000; Referee: Makijedo

30 March 1952 5	Partizan	1–2	Vojvodina	Belgrade
	Čajkovski 11'		Boškov 15' (pen.); Hirman 42'	Stadium: JNA Stadium; Attendance: 28,000; Referee: Vasa Stefanović

6 April 1952 6	Partizan	6–3	Mačva Šabac	Belgrade
	Bobek 23'; Šijaković 32'; Herceg 48', 50' (?); Kolaković 59'		Kovačević 48'; Jurišić 51'; Stanić 90'	Stadium: JNA Stadium; Attendance: 20,000; Referee: Trajan Ivanovski

20 April 1952 7	Partizan	2–1	Lokomotiva Zagreb	Belgrade
	Herceg; Čajkovski			Stadium: JNA Stadium; Attendance: 15,000

27 April 1952 8	Rabotnički	0–8	Partizan	Skopje
			Bobek; Herceg; Belin; Valok	Attendance: 8,000

4 May 1952 9	Partizan	0–3	Dinamo Zagreb	Belgrade
				Stadium: JNA Stadium; Attendance: 30,000

11 May 1952 10	Vojvodina	0–4	Partizan	Novi Sad
			Bobek; Herceg; Ognjanović	Attendance: 10,000

18 May 1952 11	Vardar	0–1	Partizan	Skopje
			Šijaković	Attendance: 10,000

25 May 1952 12	Vojvodina	0–1	Partizan	Novi Sad
			Milutinović	Attendance: 5,000

1 June 1952 13	Partizan	1–2	BSK	Belgrade
	Bobek			Stadium: JNA Stadium; Attendance: 10,000

8 June 1952 14	Partizan	7–1	Vardar	Belgrade
	Milutinović; Belin; Mihajlović; Herceg; Čajkovski			Stadium: JNA Stadium; Attendance: 3,000

15 June 1952 15	Partizan	5–5	Vojvodina	Belgrade
	Bobek; Herceg; Milutinović; Zebec			Stadium: JNA Stadium; Attendance: 10,000

22 June 1952 16	BSK	3–2	Partizan	Belgrade
			Valok; Zebec	Stadium: JNA Stadium; Attendance: 40,000

=== Yugoslav Cup ===
11 November 1951 Qualifying round	Sloboda Titovo Užice	1–11	Partizan	Titovo Užice
			Bobek; Atanacković; Valok; Čajkovski	Attendance: 4,000

18 November 1951 Qualifying round	Partizan	15–0	Sloga Petrovac na Mlavi	Belgrade
	Bobek; Čajkovski; Valok; Atanacković; Mihajlović			Stadium: JNA Stadium; Attendance: 8,000

25 November 1951 Round of 16	Pula	0–7	Partizan	Pula
			Bobek; Valok; Belin; Atanacković	Attendance: 7,000

2 December 1951 Quarter-finals	Partizan	0–2	Vojvodina	Belgrade
				Stadium: JNA Stadium; Attendance: 20,000

== Statistics ==
=== Goalscorers ===
This includes all competitive matches.

Rank	Pos	Nat	Name	Yugoslav First League	Yugoslav Cup	Total
1	FW	(Socialist Federal Republic of Yugoslavia)	Stjepan Bobek	9	16	25
2	MF	(Socialist Federal Republic of Yugoslavia)	Antun Herceg	10	0	10
3	FW	(Socialist Federal Republic of Yugoslavia)	Marko Valok	3	6	9
4	DF	(Socialist Federal Republic of Yugoslavia)	Bruno Belin	4	2	6
4	MF	(Socialist Federal Republic of Yugoslavia)	Zlatko Čajkovski	3	3	6
6	MF	(Socialist Federal Republic of Yugoslavia)	Aleksandar Atanacković	0	5	5
7	FW	(Socialist Federal Republic of Yugoslavia)	Miloš Milutinović	4	0	4
8	DF	(Socialist Federal Republic of Yugoslavia)	Vasilije Šijaković	3	0	3
9	MF	(Socialist Federal Republic of Yugoslavia)	Branko Zebec	2	0	2
9	MF	(Socialist Federal Republic of Yugoslavia)	Prvoslav Mihajlović	1	1	2
10	DF	(Socialist Federal Republic of Yugoslavia)	Božidar Kolaković	1	0	1
10	FW	(Socialist Federal Republic of Yugoslavia)	Radivoje Ognjanović	1	0	1
TOTALS				41	33	74

== See also ==
- List of FK Partizan seasons
