= 1952–53 FK Partizan season =

Partizan
1952–53 season
- President: Bogdan Vujošević
- Head coach: Toni Pogačnik (until the second half of the season); Illés Spitz
- Yugoslav First League: 3rd
- Yugoslav Cup: Winners
- Top goalscorer: League: All: Marko Valok (21)

The 1952–53 season was the seventh season in FK Partizan's existence. This article shows player statistics and matches that the club played during the 1952–53 season.

== Friendlies ==
4 September 1952 Friendly	Partizan (Socialist Federal Republic of Yugoslavia)	3–3	(Socialist Federal Republic of Yugoslavia) Crvena zvezda	Belgrade
	Bobek; Atanacković			Stadium: JNA Stadium

1 October 1952 Friendly	Partizan (Socialist Federal Republic of Yugoslavia)	34–0	(Socialist Federal Republic of Yugoslavia) Dorćol	Belgrade

5 November 1952 Friendly	Partizan (Socialist Federal Republic of Yugoslavia)	4–0	(West Germany) 1. FC Köln	Belgrade
	Bobek 16', 35', 44'; Veselinović 33'			Stadium: JNA Stadium; Attendance: 15,000; Referee: Vasa Stefanović

11 November 1952 Friendly	South France	1–3	(Socialist Federal Republic of Yugoslavia) Partizan	Marseille, France

6 January 1953 Friendly	AEK Athens (Greece)	2–4	(Socialist Federal Republic of Yugoslavia) Partizan	Athens, Greece
			Čolić 18'; Valok 21', 41'; Bobek 44'

11 January 1953 Friendly	Panathinaikos (Greece)	0–1	(Socialist Federal Republic of Yugoslavia) Partizan	Athens, Greece
			Bobek 38'

13 January 1953 Friendly	Olympiacos (Greece)	1–3	(Socialist Federal Republic of Yugoslavia) Partizan	Athens, Greece
			20' (o.g.); Herceg 59'; Bobek 71'	Attendance: 20,000

17 January 1953 Friendly	PAOK (Greece)	1–7	(Socialist Federal Republic of Yugoslavia) Partizan	Thessaloniki, Greece

18 January 1953 Friendly	Kavala XI (Greece)	3–13	(Socialist Federal Republic of Yugoslavia) Partizan	Kavala, Greece

23 January 1953 Friendly	Zamalek (Egypt)	2–2	(Socialist Federal Republic of Yugoslavia) Partizan	Cairo, Egypt

25 January 1953 Friendly	Suez (Egypt)	0–6	(Socialist Federal Republic of Yugoslavia) Partizan	Port Said, Egypt

30 January 1953 Friendly	Cairo XI (Egypt)	1–4	(Socialist Federal Republic of Yugoslavia) Partizan	Cairo, Egypt

1 February 1953 Friendly	Alexandria XI (Egypt)	1–4	(Socialist Federal Republic of Yugoslavia) Partizan	Alexandria, Egypt

4 February 1953 Friendly	Iraklis (Greece)	3–6	(Socialist Federal Republic of Yugoslavia) Partizan	Thessaloniki, Greece

2 March 1953 Friendly	TuS Neuendorf (West Germany)	0–1	(Socialist Federal Republic of Yugoslavia) Partizan	Koblenz, West Germany

5 April 1953 Friendly	SC Wacker (Austria)	2–2	(Socialist Federal Republic of Yugoslavia) Partizan	Antwerp, Belgium

6 April 1953 Friendly	Antwerp XI (Belgium)	6–2	(Socialist Federal Republic of Yugoslavia) Partizan	Antwerp, Belgium

28 June 1953 Friendly	Partizan (Socialist Federal Republic of Yugoslavia)	1–2	(Brazil) Juventus	Belgrade
	Zebec			Stadium: JNA Stadium; Attendance: 15,000

== Competitions ==
=== Yugoslav First League ===
Pos	Team	Pld	W	D	L	GF	GA	GD	Pts
1	Red Star Belgrade (C)	22	13	5	4	47	27	+20	31
2	Hajduk Split	22	11	7	4	49	35	+14	29
3	Partizan	22	11	3	8	58	36	+22	25
4	Vojvodina	22	10	4	8	37	36	+1	24
5	BSK Belgrade	22	9	5	8	34	37	−3	23

Source: rsssf.org
Rules for classification: 1) points; 2) goal difference; 3) number of goals scored.
(C) Champions

30 August 1952 1	Partizan	4–0	Vojvodina	Belgrade
	Zebec 13'; Bobek 19', 44', 56'			Stadium: JNA Stadium; Attendance: 8,000

14 September 1952 2	Partizan	3–0	Lokomotiva Zagreb	Belgrade
	Zebec 53', 90'; Milutinović 77'			Stadium: JNA Stadium; Attendance: 10,000; Referee: Ivanovski (Skopje)

28 September 1952 3	Partizan	3–2	Dinamo Zagreb	Belgrade
	Veselinović 28'; Valok 45', 50'		Lipošinović 5'; Dvornić 23'	Stadium: Stadion JNA; Attendance: 25,000; Referee: Radosav Rakić

12 October 1952 4	Zagreb	0–1	Partizan	Zagreb
			Bobek 50'	Attendance: 12,000

19 October 1952 5	Partizan	9–2	Vardar	Belgrade
	Valok 23', 40', 68', 88'; Zebec 29'; Herceg 39', 70'; Bobek 61', 79'			Stadium: JNA Stadium; Attendance: 35,000

26 October 1952 6	Partizan	5–1	BSK	Belgrade
	Valok 30', 80', 81'; Herceg 68'; Bobek 84'			Stadium: JNA Stadium; Attendance: 32,000

8 November 1952 7	Spartak Subotica	2–1	Partizan	Subotica
			Herceg 76'	Attendance: 8,000; Referee: Vasa Stefanović (Beograd)

16 November 1952 8	Partizan	4–1	Velež	Belgrade
	Veselinović 31'; Valok 35', 80'; Herceg 86'			Stadium: JNA Stadium; Attendance: 8,000

23 November 1952 9	Crvena zvezda	1–1	Partizan	Belgrade
	Tomašević 80'		Valok 60'	Stadium: JNA Stadium; Attendance: 40,000

7 December 1952 10	Partizan	2–2	Sarajevo	Belgrade
	Atanacković 60'; Valok 87'			Attendance: 20,000

14 December 1952 11	Hajduk Split	4–2	Partizan	Split
			Čajkovski 59'; Veselinović 75'	Stadium: Stadion Stari plac Attendance: 20,000; Referee: Podupski (Zagreb)

8 March 1953 12	Vojvodina	1–1	Partizan	Novi Sad
			Veselinović 26'	Attendance: 12,000

15 March 1953 13	Lokomotiva Zagreb	2–1	Partizan	Zagreb
			Veselinović 80'	Attendance: 20,000

22 March 1953 14	Dinamo Zagreb	1–3	Partizan	Zagreb
	Dvornić 12'		Milutinović 25'; Veselinović 28'; Herceg 81'	Stadium: Stadion Maksimir; Attendance: 25,000; Referee: Leo Lemešić

28 March 1953 15	Partizan	2–1	Zagreb	Belgrade
	Milutinović 35'; Veselinović 56'			Stadium: JNA Stadium; Attendance: 12,000; Referee: Barjaktarević

16 April 1953 16	Vardar	3–1	Partizan	Skopje
			Belin 5'	Attendance: 15,000

19 April 1953 17	BSK	1–0	Partizan	Belgrade
				Attendance: 25,000

24 April 1953 18	Partizan	6–2	Spartak Subotica	Belgrade
	Veselinović; Zebec; Milutinović			Stadium: JNA Stadium; Attendance: 16,000

24 May 1953 19	Velež	0–4	Partizan	Mostar
			Valok 12'; Veselinović 46', 65'; Milutinović 52'	Attendance: 10,000

31 May 1953 20	Partizan	2–4	Crvena zvezda	Belgrade
	Valok 52'; Veselinović 70'		Mitić 45'; Živanović 65'; Tomašević 80'; Đajić 84'	Stadium: JNA Stadium; Attendance: 52,000

14 June 1953 21	Sarajevo	2–1	Partizan	Sarajevo
			Herceg 36'	Attendance: 15,000

21 June 1953 22	Partizan	2–4	Hajduk Split	Belgrade
	Veselinović 8'; Milutinović 72'			Stadium: JNA Stadium; Attendance: 22,000; Referee: Vasa Stefanović (Beograd)

=== Yugoslav Cup ===
17 August 1952 Qualifying round	Radnički Kragujevac	4–5	Partizan	Kragujevac
			Valok; Mihajlović; Veselinović

23 August 1952 Qualifying round	Partizan	2–1	BSK	Belgrade
	Bobek; Herceg			Stadium: JNA Stadium; Attendance: 15,000

7 September 1952 Round of 16	Lovćen	0–3	Partizan	Cetinje
			Milutinović; Bobek; Zebec	Attendance: 3,000

5 October 1952 Quarter–finals	Partizan	5–0	Hajduk Split	Belgrade
	Valok 96'; Bobek 99'; Zebec 108'; Herceg 112', 115'			Stadium: JNA Stadium; Attendance: 40,000

2 November 1952 Semi–finals	Radnički Niš	1–4	Partizan	Niš
			Herceg; Valok; Bobek	Attendance: 10,000

29 November 1952 Final	Partizan	6–0	Crvena zvezda	Belgrade
	Valok 13', 35'; Zebec 25', 49'; Bobek 80'; Veselinović 84'			Stadium: JNA Stadium; Attendance: 50,000; Referee: Vasa Stefanovič

== Statistics ==
=== Goalscorers ===
This includes all competitive matches.

Rank	Pos	Nat	Name	Yugoslav First League	Yugoslav Cup	Total
1	FW	(Socialist Federal Republic of Yugoslavia)	Marko Valok	15	6	21
2	FW	(Socialist Federal Republic of Yugoslavia)	Todor Veselinović	14	2	16
3	FW	(Socialist Federal Republic of Yugoslavia)	Stjepan Bobek	7	5	12
3	MF	(Socialist Federal Republic of Yugoslavia)	Antun Herceg	7	5	12
5	MF	(Socialist Federal Republic of Yugoslavia)	Branko Zebec	6	4	10
6	FW	(Socialist Federal Republic of Yugoslavia)	Miloš Milutinović	6	1	7
7	MF	(Socialist Federal Republic of Yugoslavia)	Prvoslav Mihajlović	0	2	2
8	DF	(Socialist Federal Republic of Yugoslavia)	Bruno Belin	1	0	1
8	MF	(Socialist Federal Republic of Yugoslavia)	Zlatko Čajkovski	1	0	1
8	MF	(Socialist Federal Republic of Yugoslavia)	Aleksandar Atanacković	1	0	1
TOTALS				58	25	83

=== Score overview ===
Win Draw Loss

Opposition	Home score	Away score	Aggregate
Crvena zvezda	2–4	1–1	3–5
Hajduk Split	2–4	2–4	4–8
Vojvodina	4–0	1–1	5–1
BSK	5–1	0–1	5–2
Sarajevo	2–2	1–2	3–4
Dinamo Zagreb	3–2	3–1	6–3
Lokomotiva Zagreb	3–0	1–2	4–2
Vardar	9–2	1–3	10–5
Spartak Subotica	6–2	1–2	7–4
Velež	4–1	4–0	8–1
Zagreb	2–1	1–0	3–1

== See also ==
- List of FK Partizan seasons
