= 1966–67 FK Partizan season =

Partizan
1966–67 season
- President: Vladimir Dujić
- Head coach: Abdulah Gegić
- Yugoslav First League: 3rd
- Yugoslav Cup: Semi-finals
- Top goalscorer: League: All: Mustafa Hasanagić

The 1966–67 season was the 21st season in FK Partizan's existence. This article shows player statistics and matches that the club played during the 1966–67 season.

== Friendlies ==
25 October 1966 Friendly	Partizan (Socialist Federal Republic of Yugoslavia)	1–1	(Poland) Cracovia	Belgrade

22 February 1967 Friendly	Partizan (Socialist Federal Republic of Yugoslavia)	2–2	(Poland) Legia Warsaw	Belgrade
	Hasanagić; Pirmajer

31 May 1967 Friendly	Milan (Italy)	0–0	(Socialist Federal Republic of Yugoslavia) Partizan	Milan, Italy

== Competitions ==
=== Yugoslav First League ===
Pos	Team	Pld	W	D	L	GF	GA	GD	Pts	Qualification or relegation
1	Sarajevo (C)	30	18	6	6	51	29	+22	42	Qualification for European Cup first round
2	Dinamo Zagreb	30	15	10	5	42	21	+21	40	Invitation for Inter-Cities Fairs Cup first round
3	Partizan	30	14	10	6	52	28	+24	38	Invitation for Inter-Cities Fairs Cup first round
4	Vojvodina	30	12	9	9	40	39	+1	33	Invitation for Inter-Cities Fairs Cup first round
5	Red Star Belgrade	30	12	8	10	53	46	+7	32	Invitation for Mitropa Cup

Source: rsssf.org
Rules for classification: 1) points; 2) goal difference; 3) number of goals scored.
(C) Champions

21 August 1966 1	Radnički Niš	0–0	Partizan	Niš
				Stadium: Čair Stadium; Attendance: 20,000; Referee: Šestić (Mostar)

28 August 1966 2	Partizan	1–0	Rijeka	Belgrade
	Bečejac 83'			Stadium: Stadion JNA; Attendance: 15,000; Referee: Tešanić (Varaždin)

4 September 1966 3	Sarajevo	1–1	Partizan	Sarajevo
			Hošić 55'	Stadium: City Stadium Koševo; Attendance: 30,000; Referee: Tauzes (Ljubljana)

11 September 1966 4	Partizan	1–1	Crvena zvezda	Belgrade
	Bajić 45'		Džajić 58'	Stadium: Stadion JNA; Attendance: 55,000; Referee: Milivoje Gugulović

25 September 1966 5	OFK Beograd	1–1	Partizan	Belgrade
			Pirmajer 16'	Stadium: Stadion JNA; Attendance: 18,000; Referee: Zečević (Beograd)

2 October 1966 6	Partizan	0–1	Vojvodina	Belgrade
				Stadium: Stadion JNA; Attendance: 30,000; Referee: Strmečki (Zagreb)

9 October 1966 7	Vardar	4–2	Partizan	Skopje
			Hošić 25', 49'	Stadium: City Park Stadium; Attendance: 22,000; Referee: Ilić (Zagreb)

16 October 1966 8	Partizan	0–0	Dinamo Zagreb	Belgrade
				Stadium: Stadion JNA; Attendance: 25,000; Referee: Jakše (Ljubljana)

23 October 1966 9	Čelik	0–1	Partizan	Zenica
			Hošić 55'	Stadium: Bilino Polje Stadium; Referee: Kostovski (Skopje)

30 October 1966 10	Partizan	4–1	Sutjeska	Belgrade
	Bajić 11', 90'; Hasanagić 51', 85'			Stadium: Stadion JNA; Attendance: 7,000; Referee: Franković (Sarajevo)

13 November 1966 11	Željezničar	0–3	Partizan	Sarajevo
			Bečejac 11', 36'; Hošić 62'	Stadium: Stadion Grbavica; Attendance: 15,000; Referee: Kostovski (Skopje)

20 November 1966 12	Velež	1–1	Partizan	Mostar
			Hasanagić 57'	Stadium: Stadion pod Bijelim Brijegom; Attendance: 9,000; Referee: Jakše (Ljubljana)

27 November 1966 13	Partizan	1–0	Hajduk Split	Belgrade
	Hošić 61'			Stadium: Stadion JNA; Attendance: 25,000; Referee: Horvat (Zagreb)

4 December 1966 14	Olimpija	0–1	Partizan	Ljubljana
			Petrović

11 December 1966 15	Partizan	7–0	Zagreb	Belgrade
	Hošić 23', 56'; Hasanagić 54', 71', 86'; Bečejac 59', 67'			Stadium: Stadion JNA

5 March 1967 16	Partizan	5–1	Radnički Niš	Belgrade
	Đorđević 4'; Hasanagić 9'; Hošić 67', 78'; Bajić 73'			Stadium: Stadion JNA; Attendance: 25,000; Referee: Strmečki (Zagreb)

12 March 1967 17	Rijeka	1–1	Partizan	Rijeka
			Bečejac 81'	Stadium: Stadion Kantrida; Attendance: 12,000; Referee: Jakše (Ljubljana)

19 March 1967 18	Partizan	2–1	Sarajevo	Belgrade
	Hasanagić 9', 61'		Prljača 12'	Stadium: Stadion JNA; Attendance: 47,000; Referee: Gugulović (Niš)

26 March 1967 19	Crvena zvezda	3–2	Partizan	Belgrade
	Milić 3'; Aćimović 30'; Džajić 75'		Hasanagić 20'; Bečejac 37'	Stadium: Marakana; Attendance: 77,779; Referee: Milivoje Gugulović

2 April 1967 20	Partizan	1–0	OFK Beograd	Belgrade
	Hasanagić 45'			Stadium: Stadion JNA; Attendance: 8,000; Referee: Bajić (Beograd)

9 April 1967 21	Vojvodina	1–0	Partizan	Novi Sad
				Stadium: Karađorđe Stadium

16 April 1967 22	Partizan	1–1	Vardar	Belgrade
	Hasanagić 3'			Stadium: Stadion JNA; Attendance: 10,000; Referee: Strmečki (Zagreb)

7 May 1967 23	Dinamo Zagreb	3–1	Partizan	Zagreb
			Vislavski 73'	Stadium: Stadion Maksimir; Attendance: 45,000; Referee: Jakše (Ljubljana)

22 May 1967 24	Partizan	4–0	Čelik	Belgrade
	Pirmajer 39' (?); Hasanagić 45'; Vukelić (?)			Stadium: Stadion JNA; Attendance: 7,000; Referee: Tauzes (Ljubljana)

28 May 1967 25	Sutjeska	2–2	Partizan	Nikšić
			Bajić 61'; Pirmajer 71'	Stadium: Gradski stadion Attendance: 13,500; Referee: Tasladžić (Osijek)

4 June 1967 26	Partizan	1–0	Željezničar	Belgrade
	Petrović 70'			Stadium: Stadion JNA; Attendance: 14,000; Referee: Kostovski (Skopje)

10 June 1967 27	Partizan	1–1	Velež	Belgrade
	Hasanagić 62'			Stadium: Stadion JNA; Attendance: 5,000; Referee: Jakše (Ljubljana)

18 June 1967 28	Hajduk Split	2–1	Partizan	Split
			Hasanagić 81' (pen.)	Stadium: Stadion Stari plac Attendance: 15,000; Referee: Jakše (Ljubljana)

25 June 1967 29	Partizan	4–1	Olimpija	Belgrade
	Hasanagić; Vukelić			Stadium: Stadion JNA; Attendance: 3,000; Referee: Botić (Beograd)

2 July 1967 30	Zagreb	2–1	Partizan	Zagreb
			Petrović 21'	Attendance: 4,000; Referee: Šestić (Mostar)

=== Yugoslav Cup ===
20 November 1966 Round of 32	Partizan	3–0	Voždovački	Belgrade
	Bajić 4'; Hasanagić 8'; Pirmajer (?)			Stadium: Stadion JNA

26 February 1967 Round of 16	Partizan	2–0	Maribor	Belgrade
	Hasanagić 49'; Hošić 75'			Stadium: Stadion JNA; Attendance: 15,000; Referee: Strmečki (Zagreb)

22 March 1967 Quarter-finals	Partizan	2–1	Proleter Zrenjanin	Belgrade
	Pirmajer 15'; Hasanagić 62'			Stadium: Stadion JNA; Attendance: 8,000; Referee: Kostovski (Skopje)

5 April 1967 Semi-finals	Sarajevo	1–0	Partizan	Sarajevo
	Musemić 24'			Stadium: City Stadium Koševo; Attendance: 35,000; Referee: Lado Jakše (Ljubljana)

== Statistics ==
=== Goalscorers ===
This includes all competitive matches.

Rank	Pos	Nat	Name	Yugoslav First League	Yugoslav Cup	Total
1	FW	(Socialist Federal Republic of Yugoslavia)	Mustafa Hasanagić	18	3	21
2	FW	(Socialist Federal Republic of Yugoslavia)	Idriz Hošić	10	1	11
3	MF	(Socialist Federal Republic of Yugoslavia)	Radoslav Bečejac	7	0	7
4	MF	(Socialist Federal Republic of Yugoslavia)	Josip Pirmajer	4	2	6
4	MF	(Socialist Federal Republic of Yugoslavia)	Mane Bajić	5	1	6
6	MF	(Socialist Federal Republic of Yugoslavia)	Miodrag Petrović	3	0	3
7	MF	(Socialist Federal Republic of Yugoslavia)	Milan Vukelić	2	0	2
8	FW	(Socialist Federal Republic of Yugoslavia)	Joakim Vislavski	1	0	1
8	MF	(Socialist Federal Republic of Yugoslavia)	Borivoje Đorđević	1	0	1
TOTALS				51	7	58

=== Score overview ===
Win Draw Loss

Opposition	Home score	Away score	Aggregate
Sarajevo	2–1	1–1	3–2
Dinamo Zagreb	0–0	1–3	1–3
Vojvodina	0–1	0–1	0–2
Crvena zvezda	1–1	2–3	3–4
Željezničar	1–0	3–0	4–0
Hajduk Split	1–0	1–2	2–2
Vardar	1–1	2–4	3–5
Radnički Niš	5–1	0–0	5–1
Velež	1–1	1–1	2–2
Rijeka	1–0	1–1	2–1
Zagreb	7–0	1–2	8–2
OFK Beograd	1–0	1–1	2–1
Olimpija	4–1	1–0	5–1
Sutjeska	4–1	2–2	6–3
Čelik	4–0	1–0	1–4

== See also ==
- List of FK Partizan seasons
