= 1947–48 FK Partizan season =

Partizan 1947–48 football season

Partizan
1947–48 season
- Head coach: Illés Spitz
- Yugoslav First League: 3rd
- Top goalscorer: League: All: Prvoslav Mihajlović

The 1947–48 season was the second season in FK Partizan's existence. This article shows player statistics and matches that the club played during the 1947–48 season.

== Friendlies ==
2 November 1947 Friendly	ITA Arad	0–2	Partizan	Bucharest, Romania

6 November 1947 Friendly	Ciocanul București	1–5	Partizan	Bucharest, Romania

14 December 1947 Friendly	Partizan	2–1	Csepel SC	Belgrade
	Senčar; Mihajlović

1 May 1948 Friendly	Partizan	3–0	AFK Bohemians Praha	Belgrade
	Senčar			Attendance: 30,000

2 May 1948 Friendly	Partizan	1–1	MTK Budapest	Belgrade
	Senčar			Attendance: 30,000

== Competitions ==
=== Yugoslav First League ===
Pos	Team	Pld	W	D	L	GF	GA	GR	Pts
1	Dinamo Zagreb (C)	18	14	1	3	56	20	2.800	29
2	Hajduk Split	18	11	2	5	40	15	2.667	24
3	Partizan	18	10	4	4	46	22	2.091	24
4	Lokomotiva	18	7	5	6	21	18	1.167	19
5	Red Star Belgrade	18	5	6	7	24	25	0.960	16

Source: rsssf.org
Rules for classification: 1st points; 2nd goal average.
(C) Champions

==== Matches ====
17 August 1947 1	Partizan	4–0	Vardar	Belgrade
	Radunović 44'; Simonovski 48' ?'; Matković 68'			Attendance: 10,000; Referee: Rakić

24 August 1947 2	Partizan	0–0	Metalac Belgrade	Belgrade
				Attendance: 15,000; Referee: Života Vlajić

31 August 1947 3	Lokomotiva Zagreb	3–1	Partizan	Zagreb
	Melnjak; Krnić; Žigman		Mihajlović	Attendance: 18,000; Referee: Leo Lemešić

7 September 1947 4	Partizan	3–3	Torpedo	Belgrade
	Atanacković 7'; Mihajlović 35'; Bobek 69'		Lovrić 46'; Novaković 41'; Rajlić 82'	Attendance: 25,000; Referee: Ivan Božina

18 September 1947 5	Spartak Subotica	2–3	Partizan	Subotica
	Kopilović; Vorgučin		Simonovski; Mihajlović; Bobek	Attendance: 3,000; Referee: Miljenko Podupski

21 September 1947 6	Partizan	3–1	Dinamo Zagreb	Belgrade
	Mihajlović 18'; Atanacković 34'; Pálfi 45'		Reiss 50'	Attendance: 20,000; Referee: Josip Milesa

5 October 1947 7	Partizan	1–1	Crvena zvezda	Belgrade
	Mihajlović ?'		Stanković 89'	Attendance: 30,000; Referee: Mika Popović

8 October 1947 8	Partizan	5–0	Ponziana Trieste	Belgrade
	Mihajlović; Simonovski			Attendance: 3,000; Referee: Petar Mrkobrad

26 October 1947 9	Hajduk Split	2–1	Partizan	Split
	Matošić 1'; Vukas 12'		Mihajlović	Attendance: 5,000; Referee: Josip Epert

14 March 1948 10	Vardar	4–3	Partizan	Skopje
	Janevski 69', 80'; Cincijevski 70'; Cekić 89'		Mihajlović; Valok; Gerov o.g.'	Attendance: 12,000

21 March 1948 11	Metalac Belgrade	1–1	Partizan	Belgrade
	Stanković 67'		Mihajlović 69'	Attendance: 16,000; Referee: Moni Kario

28 March 1948 12	Partizan	2–1	Lokomotiva Zagreb	Belgrade
	Jezerkić 69', 77'		Žigman 65'	Attendance: 20,000

4 April 1948 13	Sarajevo	1–5	Partizan	Sarajevo
	Novaković 73'		Valok 13'; Jezerkić 31'; Bobek 58'; Simonovski 83'; Čajkovski 86'	Attendance: 10,000; Referee: Višnjić

11 April 1948 14	Partizan	3–1	Spartak Subotica	Belgrade
	Senčar 13', 32'; Mihajlović 42'		Čajkovski (o.g.)	Attendance: 8,000

18 April 1948 15	Dinamo Zagreb	1–0	Partizan	Zagreb
	Benko 70'			Attendance: 30,000

27 April 1948 16	Crvena zvezda	0–1	Partizan	Belgrade
			Jezerkić	Attendance: 20,000; Referee: Leo Lemešić

20 May 1948 17	Ponziana Trieste	1–8	Partizan	Trieste
	89'		Strnad; Mihajlović; Simonovski; Senčar	Attendance: 5,000

30 May 1948 18	Partizan	2–0	Hajduk Split	Belgrade
	Radunović 17'; Mihajlović 74'			Attendance: 10,000; Referee: Vlada Milutinović

=== Yugoslav Cup ===
16 November 1947 Round of 16	Partizan	2–0	Proleter Priština	Belgrade
	Jezerkić 75', 81'			Attendance: 3,000

23 November 1947 Quarter–finals	Partizan	2–1	Crvena zvezda	Belgrade
	Bobek 21'; Jezerkić 53'			Attendance: 20,000

29 November 1947 Semi–finals	Partizan	4–0	Sloga Novi Sad	Belgrade
	Simonovski 1'; Mihajlović 3', 24'; Jezerkić 30'			Attendance: 12,000

30 November 1947 Final	Partizan	2–0	Naša Krila	Belgrade
	Jezerkić 20'; Simonovski 23'			Attendance: 10,000

== See also ==
- List of FK Partizan seasons
