= 1982–83 FK Partizan season =

Partizan
1982–83 season
- President: Miloš Ostojić
- Head coach: Miloš Milutinović
- Yugoslav First League: Winners
- Yugoslav Cup: Round of 16
- Top goalscorer: League: All: Dragan Mance
- Average home league attendance: 22,000

The 1982–83 season was the 37th season in FK Partizan's existence. This article shows player statistics and matches that the club played during the 1982–83 season.

== Players ==
=== Squad information ===
| Player | Apps | Goals |
|---|---|---|
| (Socialist Federal Republic of Yugoslavia) Ljubomir Radanović | 34 | 3 |
| (Socialist Federal Republic of Yugoslavia) Aleksandar Trifunović | 32 | 9 |
| (Socialist Federal Republic of Yugoslavia) Momčilo Vukotić | 32 | 5 |
| (Socialist Federal Republic of Yugoslavia) Slobodan Rojević | 32 | 1 |
| (Socialist Federal Republic of Yugoslavia) Dragan Mance | 30 | 15 |
| (Socialist Federal Republic of Yugoslavia) Miodrag Ješić | 27 | 1 |
| (Socialist Federal Republic of Yugoslavia) Miodrag Radović | 25 | 1 |
| (Socialist Federal Republic of Yugoslavia) Zvonko Živković | 23 | 9 |
| (Socialist Federal Republic of Yugoslavia) Zoran Dimitrijević | 23 | 2 |
| (Socialist Federal Republic of Yugoslavia) Nenad Stojković | 23 | 1 |
| (Socialist Federal Republic of Yugoslavia) Admir Smajić | 22 | 0 |
| (Socialist Federal Republic of Yugoslavia) Nikica Klinčarski | 21 | 2 |
| (Socialist Federal Republic of Yugoslavia) Zvonko Varga | 20 | 3 |
| (Socialist Federal Republic of Yugoslavia) Rade Zalad | 20 | 0 |
| (Socialist Federal Republic of Yugoslavia) Dževad Prekazi | 19 | 4 |
| (Socialist Federal Republic of Yugoslavia) Ranko Stojić | 16 | 0 |
| (Socialist Federal Republic of Yugoslavia) Sead Sarajlić | 11 | 0 |
| (Socialist Federal Republic of Yugoslavia) Zvonko Popović | 10 | 1 |
| (Socialist Federal Republic of Yugoslavia) Miloš Đelmaš | 6 | 0 |
| (Socialist Federal Republic of Yugoslavia) Novica Kostić | 2 | 0 |
| (Socialist Federal Republic of Yugoslavia) Stevica Kuzmanovski | 2 | 0 |
| (Socialist Federal Republic of Yugoslavia) Slobodan Pavković | 2 | 0 |
| (Socialist Federal Republic of Yugoslavia) Sead Mašić | 2 | 0 |
| (Socialist Federal Republic of Yugoslavia) Radomir Radulović | 1 | 0 |
| (Socialist Federal Republic of Yugoslavia) Zoran Lilić | 1 | 0 |

== Friendlies ==
Belgrade tournament Winner:FK Partizan

| 5 August 1982 Belgrade tournament | Crvena zvezda (Socialist Federal Republic of Yugoslavia) | 0–3 | (Socialist Federal Republic of Yugoslavia) Partizan | Belgrade |
| | | | Mance 44', 50'; Vukotić 69' | Stadium: Marakana; Attendance: 20,000; Referee: Stanković |

| 6 August 1982 Belgrade tournament | Partizan (Socialist Federal Republic of Yugoslavia) | 0–0 (5-4) | (Socialist Federal Republic of Yugoslavia) Galenika Zemun | Belgrade |

Titograd tournament Winner:Partizan

| 26 February 1983 Titograd tournament | Partizan (Socialist Federal Republic of Yugoslavia) | 7-1 | (Socialist Federal Republic of Yugoslavia) Velež | Titograd |
| | Mance; Mance Mance Trifunović Trifunovic Živkovic Klinčarski | | | Stadium: Budućnost Stadium |

| 27 February 1983 Titograd tournament | Budućnost Titograd (Socialist Federal Republic of Yugoslavia) | 1-1 (3-4) | (Socialist Federal Republic of Yugoslavia) FK Partizan | Titograd |
| | | | Trifunovic |

Skoplje tournament 2nd place:Partizan

| Skoplje tournament | Partizan (Socialist Federal Republic of Yugoslavia) | 1–0 | (Socialist Federal Republic of Yugoslavia) Radnički Niš | Skoplje |

| Skoplje tournament | Vardar (Socialist Federal Republic of Yugoslavia) | 4–2 | (Socialist Federal Republic of Yugoslavia) Partizan | Skoplje |

Friendly game

| 8 August 1982 Friendly | Borussia Dortmund (West Germany) | 2–0 | (Socialist Federal Republic of Yugoslavia) Partizan | Dortmund, West Germany |

== Competitions ==
=== Yugoslav First League ===
| Pos | Team | Pld | W | D | L | GF | GA | GD | Pts | Qualification or relegation |
|---|---|---|---|---|---|---|---|---|---|---|
| 1 | Partizan (C) | 34 | 17 | 11 | 6 | 58 | 37 | +21 | 45 | Qualification for European Cup first round |
| 2 | Hajduk Split | 34 | 14 | 15 | 5 | 51 | 33 | +18 | 43 | Qualification for UEFA Cup first round |
| 3 | Dinamo Zagreb | 34 | 14 | 15 | 5 | 56 | 40 | +16 | 43 | Qualification for Cup Winners' Cup first round |
| 4 | Radnički Niš | 34 | 15 | 10 | 9 | 45 | 39 | +6 | 40 | Qualification for UEFA Cup first round |
| 5 | Red Star Belgrade | 34 | 13 | 11 | 10 | 55 | 50 | +5 | 37 | Qualification for UEFA Cup first round |

Source: rsssf.org
Rules for classification: 1) points; 2) goal difference; 3) number of goals scored.
(C) Champions

==== Matches ====
| 14 August 1982 1 | Partizan | 3–1 | Osijek | Belgrade |
| | Radanović 45'; Živković 52', 58' | | | Stadium: Stadion JNA; Attendance: 15,000 |

| 22 August 1982 2 | Sarajevo | 3–1 | Partizan | Sarajevo |
| | | | Klinčarski 76' | Attendance: 22,000 |

| 29 August 1982 3 | Partizan | 2–0 | Rijeka | Belgrade |
| | Živković 12', 15' | | | Stadium: Stadion JNA; Attendance: 15,000 |

| 1 September 1982 4 | Vardar | 5–0 | Partizan | Skopje |
| | | | | Attendance: 35,000 |

| 5 September 1982 5 | Partizan | 5–0 | Vojvodina | Belgrade |
| | Trifunović 20'; Mance 37', 55', 85'; Dimitrijević 75' | | | Stadium: Stadion JNA; Attendance: 15,000 |

| 12 September 1982 6 | Galenika Zemun | 1–3 | Partizan | Belgrade |
| | | | Dimitrijević 16'; Živković 20'; Trifunović 48' (pen.) | Attendance: 10,000 |

| 18 September 1982 7 | Partizan | 2–1 | OFK Beograd | Belgrade |
| | Trifunović 7' (pen.); Živković 70' | | | Stadium: Stadion JNA; Attendance: 25,000 |

| 26 September 1982 8 | Radnički Niš | 0–0 | Partizan | Niš |
| | | | | Attendance: 20,000 |

| 2 October 1982 9 | Partizan | 3–1 | Dinamo Vinkovci | Belgrade |
| | Radanović 27'; Trifunović 55'; Živković 66' | | | Stadium: Stadion JNA; Attendance: 15,000 |

| 5 October 1982 10 | Željezničar | 1–1 | Partizan | Sarajevo |
| | | | Živković 89' | Attendance: 20,000 |

| 17 October 1982 11 | Partizan | 2–0 | Olimpija | Belgrade |
| | Trifunović 9' (pen.); Ješić 36' | | | Stadium: Stadion JNA; Attendance: 15,000 |

| 24 October 1982 12 | Dinamo Zagreb | 3–4 | Partizan | Zagreb |
| | Arnautović 47'; Deverić 53'; Kranjčar 72' (pen.) | | Mance 3', 50'; Vukotić 58'; Živković 61' | Stadium: Stadion Maksimir; Attendance: 45,000 |

| 31 October 1982 13 | Partizan | 0–0 | Budućnost | Belgrade |
| | | | | Stadium: Stadion JNA; Attendance: 25,000 |

| 7 November 1982 14 | Crvena zvezda | 1–1 | Partizan | Belgrade |
| | Jovin 55' | | Mance 37' | Stadium: Marakana; Attendance: 75,000 |

| 21 November 1982 15 | Partizan | 1–0 | Sloboda Tuzla | Belgrade |
| | Trifunović 69' | | | Stadium: Stadion JNA; Attendance: 12,000 |

| 28 November 1982 16 | Partizan | 2–0 | Hajduk Split | Belgrade |
| | Vukotić 1'; Trifunović 23' (pen.) | | | Stadium: Stadion JNA; Attendance: 30,000 |

| 5 December 1982 17 | Velež | 1–1 | Partizan | Mostar |
| | | | Klinčarski 14' | Attendance: 12,000 |

| 6 March 1983 18 | Osijek | 1–0 | Partizan | Osijek |
| | | | | Attendance: 20,000 |

| 12 March 1983 19 | Partizan | 0–1 | Sarajevo | Belgrade |
| | | | | Stadium: Stadion JNA; Attendance: 20,000 |

| 20 March 1983 20 | Rijeka | 2–2 | Partizan | Rijeka |
| | | | Stojković 25'; Vukotić 84' | Stadium: Stadion Kantrida; Attendance: 12,000 |

| 26 March 1983 21 | Partizan | 4–0 | Vardar | Belgrade |
| | Radanović 27'; Banković 37' (o.g.); Radović 62'; Živković 89' | | | Stadium: Stadion JNA; Attendance: 12,000 |

| 3 April 1983 22 | Vojvodina | 1–1 | Partizan | Novi Sad |
| | | | Prekazi 43' | Attendance: 20,000 |

| 9 April 1983 23 | Partizan | 2–0 | Galenika Zemun | Belgrade |
| | Prekazi 20'; Vukotić 54' | | | Stadium: Stadion JNA; Attendance: 20,000 |

| 13 April 1983 24 | OFK Beograd | 1–2 | Partizan | Belgrade |
| | | | Prekazi 8'; Mance 43' | Attendance: 12,000 |

| 17 April 1983 25 | Partizan | 3–1 | Radnički Niš | Belgrade |
| | Mance 6', 45'; Trifunović 88' (pen.) | | | Stadium: Stadion JNA; Attendance: 35,000 |

| 1 May 1983 26 | Dinamo Vinkovci | 1–1 | Partizan | Vinkovci |
| | | | Mance 56' | Attendance: 20,000 |

| 7 May 1983 27 | Partizan | 2–1 | Željezničar | Belgrade |
| | Mance 46', 54' | | | Stadium: Stadion JNA; Attendance: 30,000 |

| 14 May 1983 28 | Olimpija | 0–0 | Partizan | Ljubljana |
| | | | | Attendance: 12,000 |

| 21 May 1983 29 | Partizan | 2–2 | Dinamo Zagreb | Belgrade |
| 19:00 | Trifunović 63' (pen.); Mance 83' | | Rojević 17' (o.g.); Kranjčar 44' | Stadium: Marakana*; Attendance: 100,000 |

| 29 May 1983 30 | Budućnost | 3–2 | Partizan | Titograd |
| | | | Vukotić 32'; Prekazi 77' | Attendance: 15,000 |

| 4 June 1983 31 | Partizan | 3–2 | Crvena zvezda | Belgrade |
| | Varga 35'; Mance 61', 76' | | Đurović 64'; Milojević 84' | Stadium: Stadion JNA; Attendance: 50,000 |

| 11 June 1983 32 | Sloboda Tuzla | 1–2 | Partizan | Tuzla |
| | | | Varga 8', 24' | Attendance: 7,000 |

| 14 June 1983 33 | Hajduk Split | 1–0 | Partizan | Split |
| | Vujović 1' | | | Stadium: Stadion Poljud; Attendance: 50,000 |

| 26 June 1983 34 | Partizan | 1–1 | Velež | Belgrade |
| | Rojević 47' | | Bajević 57' | Stadium: Stadion JNA; Attendance: 50,000 |

=== Yugoslav Cup ===
| 3 September 1982 Round of 32 | Partizan | 1–0 | Leotar | Belgrade |
| | Đelmaš 49' | | | Stadium: Stadion JNA; Attendance: 5,000 |

| 10 November 1982 Round of 16 | Sloboda Tuzla | 3–2 | Partizan | Tuzla |
| | | | Živković 87', 89' | Attendance: 12,000 |

== See also ==
- List of FK Partizan seasons
