= 1981–82 FK Partizan season =

Partizan
1981–82 season
- President: Vlada Kostić
- Head coach: Tomislav Kaloperović
- Yugoslav First League: 6th
- Yugoslav Cup: First round

The 1981–82 season was the 36th season in FK Partizan's existence. This article shows player statistics and matches that the club played during the 1981–82 season.

== Friendlies ==
7 August 1981 Friendly	Real Madrid (Spain)	3–2	(Socialist Federal Republic of Yugoslavia) Partizan	La Línea de la Concepción, Spain
	29'; 49'; 87'		Vukotić 21'; Đelmaš 50'

9 August 1981 Friendly	Sporting Gijón (Spain)	2–3	(Socialist Federal Republic of Yugoslavia) Partizan	La Línea de la Concepción, Spain
	40'; 62'		Živković 31', 80'; Kaličanin 74' (pen.)

20 October 1981 Friendly	Partizan (Socialist Federal Republic of Yugoslavia)	2–0	(West Germany) Borussia Dortmund	Belgrade

3 February 1982 Friendly	Partizan (Socialist Federal Republic of Yugoslavia)	1–0	(Hungary) Budapest Honvéd	Belgrade
	Varga

6 February 1982 Friendly	Partizan (Socialist Federal Republic of Yugoslavia)	1–1	(East Germany) Dynamo Dresden	Skopje

7 February 1982 Friendly	Vardar (Socialist Federal Republic of Yugoslavia)	0–1	(Socialist Federal Republic of Yugoslavia) Partizan	Skopje

29 May 1982 Friendly	Rapid Wien (Austria)	3–1	(Socialist Federal Republic of Yugoslavia) Partizan	Vienna, Austria
	40'; 43'; 73'		Trifunović 76'	Stadium: Praterstadion; Attendance: 7,000

== Competitions ==
=== Yugoslav First League ===
Pos	Team	Pld	W	D	L	GF	GA	GD	Pts	Qualification or relegation
4	Sarajevo	34	16	7	11	57	54	+3	39	Qualification for UEFA Cup first round
5	Željezničar	34	16	6	12	52	37	+15	38	
6	Partizan	34	14	9	11	40	31	+9	37	
7	Velež	34	13	10	11	49	40	+9	36	
8	Budućnost	34	13	8	13	47	44	+3	34	

Source: rsssf.org
Rules for classification: 1) points; 2) goal difference; 3) number of goals scored.

26 July 1981 1	Partizan	2–0	Zagreb	Belgrade
	Ješić 10'; Varga 46'			Stadium: Stadion JNA; Attendance: 20,000

2 August 1981 2	Vojvodina	4–3	Partizan	Novi Sad
			Živković; Kaličanin	Attendance: 25,000

12 August 1981 3	Partizan	1–0	Radnički Niš	Belgrade
	Mance 86'			Stadium: Stadion JNA; Attendance: 25,000

16 August 1981 4	Partizan	1–0	Rijeka	Belgrade
	Kaličanin 84'			Stadium: Stadion JNA; Attendance: 15,000

22 August 1981 5	Osijek	1–1	Partizan	Osijek
			Živković 58'	Attendance: 10,000

30 August 1981 6	Partizan	0–0	Olimpija	Belgrade
				Stadium: Stadion JNA; Attendance: 20,000

13 September 1981 7	Vardar	1–1	Partizan	Skopje
			Klinčarski 16'	Attendance: 30,000

20 September 1981 8	Partizan	1–0	Željezničar	Belgrade
	Živković 67'			Stadium: Stadion JNA; Attendance: 25,000

23 September 1981 9	Dinamo Zagreb	1–0	Partizan	Zagreb
				Attendance: 50,000

26 September 1981 10	Partizan	4–1	Velež	Belgrade
	Varga 8', 63', 85'; Mulahasanović 40' (o.g.)			Stadium: Stadion JNA; Attendance: 10,000

3 October 1981 11	Budućnost	1–3	Partizan	Titograd
			Živković 7'; Stojković 45'; Ješić 48'	Attendance: 8,000

11 October 1981 12	Partizan	1–0	OFK Beograd	Belgrade
	Mance 36'			Stadium: Stadion JNA; Attendance: 30,000

25 October 1981 13	Crvena zvezda	1–0	Partizan	Belgrade
	Djurovski 5'			Stadium: Marakana; Attendance: 80,000

28 October 1981 14	Partizan	2–3	Hajduk Split	Belgrade
	Vukotić 45'; Mance 50'		Slišković 30'; Pešić 38'; Zo. Vujović 87'	Stadium: Stadion JNA; Attendance: 40,000

1 November 1981 15	Sloboda Tuzla	3–1	Partizan	Tuzla
			Kaličanin 67' (pen.)	Attendance: 8,000

8 November 1981 16	Partizan	4–0	Teteks	Belgrade
	Vukotić 6'; Varga 37'; Ješić 45'; Mance 63'			Stadium: Stadion JNA; Attendance: 6,000

15 November 1981 17	Sarajevo	0–0	Partizan	Sarajevo
				Attendance: 10,000

14 February 1982 18	Zagreb	0–1	Partizan	Zagreb
			Živković 68'	Attendance: 12,000

21 February 1982 19	Partizan	2–0	Vojvodina	Belgrade
	Đelmaš 46'; Mance 68'			Stadium: Stadion JNA; Attendance: 15,000

27 February 1982 20	Radnički Niš	1–0	Partizan	Niš
				Attendance: 20,000

7 March 1982 21	Rijeka	1–0	Partizan	Rijeka
				Attendance: 8,000

11 March 1982 22	Partizan	1–0	Osijek	Belgrade
	Vukotić 51'			Stadium: Stadion JNA; Attendance: 7,000

13 March 1982 23	Olimpija	3–1	Partizan	Ljubljana
			Vukotić 72'	Attendance: 2,000

21 March 1982 24	Partizan	1–0	Vardar	Belgrade
	Varga 50'			Stadium: Stadion JNA; Attendance: 12,000

24 March 1982 25	Željezničar	0–1	Partizan	Sarajevo
			Vukotić 38'	Attendance: 20,000

28 March 1982 26	Partizan	0–0	Dinamo Zagreb	Belgrade
				Stadium: Stadion JNA; Attendance: 45,000

1 April 1982 27	Velež	0–0	Partizan	Mostar
				Attendance: 7,000

4 April 1982 28	Partizan	0–0	Budućnost	Belgrade
				Stadium: Stadion JNA; Attendance: 15,000

11 April 1982 29	OFK Beograd	1–0	Partizan	Belgrade
				Attendance: 17,000

14 April 1982 30	Partizan	1–4	Crvena zvezda	Belgrade
	Živković 7'		Djurovski 5'; Šestić 64', 85'; Đorđić 74'	Stadium: Stadion JNA; Attendance: 35,000

18 April 1982 31	Hajduk Split	3–0	Partizan	Split
				Attendance: 20,000

25 April 1982 32	Partizan	7–2	Sloboda Tuzla	Belgrade
	Živković 2'; Vukotić 13', 49', 52'; Pavković 31'; Varga 44', 75'			Stadium: Stadion JNA; Attendance: 6,000

28 April 1982 33	Teteks	0–0	Partizan	Tetovo
				Attendance: 9,000

2 May 1982 34	Partizan	0–0	Sarajevo	Belgrade
				Stadium: Stadion JNA; Attendance: 10,000

=== Yugoslav Cup ===
7 October 1981 Round of 32	Partizan	0–2	Galenika	Belgrade
				Stadium: Stadion JNA; Attendance: 15,000

== Statistics ==
=== Goalscorers ===
This includes all competitive matches.

Rank	Pos	Nat	Name	Yugoslav First League	Yugoslav Cup	Total
1	FW	(Socialist Federal Republic of Yugoslavia)	Zvonko Varga	8	0	8
1	MF	(Socialist Federal Republic of Yugoslavia)	Zvonko Živković	8	0	8
1	MF	(Socialist Federal Republic of Yugoslavia)	Momčilo Vukotić	8	0	8
4	FW	(Socialist Federal Republic of Yugoslavia)	Dragan Mance	5	0	5
5	DF	(Socialist Federal Republic of Yugoslavia)	Dragi Kaličanin	3	0	3
5	MF	(Socialist Federal Republic of Yugoslavia)	Miodrag Ješić	3	0	3
7	DF	(Socialist Federal Republic of Yugoslavia)	Nenad Stojković	1	0	1
7	MF	(Socialist Federal Republic of Yugoslavia)	Miloš Đelmaš	1	0	1
7	MF	(Socialist Federal Republic of Yugoslavia)	Nikica Klinčarski	1	0	1
7	MF	(Socialist Federal Republic of Yugoslavia)	Slobodan Pavković	1	0	1
7	own goals			1	0	1
TOTALS				40	0	40

=== Score overview ===
Win Draw Loss

Opposition	Home score	Away score	Aggregate
Dinamo Zagreb	0–0	0–1	0–1
Crvena zvezda	1–4	0–1	1–5
Hajduk Split	2–3	0–3	2–6
Sarajevo	0–0	0–0	0–0
Željezničar	1–0	1–0	2–0
Velež	4–1	0–0	4–1
Budućnost	0–0	3–1	3–1
Olimpija	0–0	1–3	1–3
Vojvodina	2–0	3–4	5–4
Radnički Niš	1–0	0–1	1–1
Rijeka	1–0	0–1	1–1
Sloboda Tuzla	7–2	1–3	8–5
Vardar	1–0	1–1	2–1
OFK Beograd	1–0	0–1	1–1
Osijek	1–0	1–1	2–1
Teteks	4–0	0–0	4–0
Zagreb	2–0	1–0	3–0

== See also ==
- List of FK Partizan seasons
