= Mike Mesaros =

Mike Mesaros may refer to:

- Mike Mesaros (musician), bass and vocalist of The Smithereens
- Mihalj Mesaroš (1935–2017), Yugoslav footballer
