= 1979–80 FK Partizan season =

Partizan
1979–80 season
- President: Vlada Kostić
- Head coach: Josip Duvančić
- Yugoslav First League: 13th
- Yugoslav Cup: Quarter-finals

The 1979–80 season was the 34th season in FK Partizan's existence. This article shows player statistics and matches that the club played during the 1979–80 season.

== Friendlies ==
9 February 1980 Friendly	Sarajevo (Socialist Federal Republic of Yugoslavia)	0–3	(Socialist Federal Republic of Yugoslavia) Partizan	Mostar
			Vukotić; Varga; Santrač

10 February 1980 Friendly	Velež (Socialist Federal Republic of Yugoslavia)	1–0	(Socialist Federal Republic of Yugoslavia) Partizan	Mostar

29 April 1980 Friendly	Partizan (Socialist Federal Republic of Yugoslavia)	1–1	Bulgaria	Belgrade

== Competitions ==
=== Yugoslav First League ===
Pos	Team	Pld	W	D	L	GF	GA	GD	Pts	Qualification or relegation
11	Budućnost	34	10	12	12	34	34	0	32	
12	Dinamo Zagreb	34	9	14	11	43	44	−1	32	Qualification for Cup Winners' Cup first round
13	Partizan	34	10	12	12	31	37	−6	32	
14	Borac Banja Luka	34	11	8	15	34	42	−8	30	
15	Olimpija	34	11	8	15	30	45	−15	30	

Source: rsssf.org
Rules for classification: 1) points; 2) goal difference; 3) number of goals scored.

15 July 1979 1	Dinamo Zagreb	5–1	Partizan	Zagreb
			Varga 41'	Attendance: 35,000

22 July 1979 2	Partizan	1–1	Radnički Niš	Belgrade
	Santrač 4'			Stadium: Stadion JNA; Attendance: 15,000

29 July 1979 3	Vardar	5–0	Partizan	Skopje
				Attendance: 25,000

2 August 1979 4	Partizan	0–0	Čelik	Belgrade
				Stadium: Stadion JNA; Attendance: 2,000

5 August 1979 5	Napredak Kruševac	1–0	Partizan	Kruševac
				Attendance: 25,000

12 August 1979 6	Partizan	2–0	Rijeka	Belgrade
	Vukotić 1'; Klinčarski 16'			Stadium: Stadion JNA; Attendance: 25,000

18 August 1979 7	Sarajevo	2–2	Partizan	Sarajevo
			Prekazi 19', 73'	Attendance: 6,000

26 August 1979 8	Budućnost	2–0	Partizan	Titograd
				Attendance: 18,000

2 September 1979 9	Partizan	0–0	Osijek	Belgrade
				Stadium: Stadion JNA; Attendance: 18,000

5 September 1979 10	Sloboda Tuzla	2–0	Partizan	Tuzla
				Attendance: 10,000

9 September 1979 11	Partizan	3–1	Borac Banja Luka	Belgrade
	Santrač 28', 79' (pen.); Varga 43'			Stadium: Stadion JNA; Attendance: 15,000

7 October 1979 12	Velež	0–0	Partizan	Mostar
				Attendance: 15,000

14 October 1979 13	Partizan	3–1	Olimpija	Belgrade
	Vukotić 7'; Đurović 58'; Santrač 84'		Terčić 19'	Stadium: Stadion JNA; Attendance: 10,000

21 October 1979 14	Vojvodina	1–2	Partizan	Novi Sad
			Prekazi 64', 84'	Attendance: 20,000

3 November 1979 15	Partizan	3–0	Željezničar	Belgrade
	Varga 24'; Vukotić 49', 76'			Stadium: Stadion JNA; Attendance: 15,000

18 November 1979 16	Crvena zvezda	2–0	Partizan	Belgrade
				Attendance: 85,000

25 November 1979 17	Partizan	3–0	Hajduk Split	Belgrade
	Kunovac 10'; Varga 20', 87'			Stadium: Stadion JNA; Attendance: 25,000

2 March 1980 18	Partizan	1–0	Dinamo Zagreb	Belgrade
	Vukotić 45'			Stadium: Stadion JNA; Attendance: 35,000

9 March 1980 19	Radnički Niš	1–0	Partizan	Niš
				Attendance: 20,000

13 March 1980 20	Partizan	3–2	Vardar	Belgrade
	Pavković 17'; Živković 57'; Varga 79'			Stadium: Stadion JNA; Attendance: 3,000

16 March 1980 21	Čelik Zenica	1–1	Partizan	Zenica
			Varga 79'	Attendance: 18,000

6 April 1980 22	Partizan	0–0	Napredak Kruševac	Belgrade
				Stadium: Stadion JNA; Attendance: 15,000

13 April 1980 23	Rijeka	0–0	Partizan	Rijeka
				Stadium: Stadion Kantrida; Attendance: 8,000

20 April 1980 24	Partizan	2–0	Sarajevo	Belgrade
	Klinčarski 49', 66'			Stadium: Stadion JNA; Attendance: 18,000

4 May 1980 25	Partizan	1–1	Budućnost	Belgrade
	Varga			Stadium: Stadion JNA; Attendance: 20,000

11 May 1980 26	Partizan	2–0	Sloboda Tuzla	Belgrade
	Smailagić 55' (o.g.); Živković 64'			Stadium: Stadion JNA; Attendance: 8,000

15 May 1980 27	Osijek	1–0	Partizan	Osijek
				Attendance: 2,000

25 May 1980 28	Borac Banja Luka	1–0	Partizan	Banja Luka
				Attendance: 15,000

1 June 1980 29	Partizan	0–1	Velež	Belgrade
				Stadium: Stadion JNA; Attendance: 12,000

4 June 1980 30	Olimpija	2–0	Partizan	Ljubljana
				Attendance: 13,000

8 June 1980 31	Partizan	0–0	Vojvodina	Belgrade
				Stadium: Stadion JNA; Attendance: 10,000

15 June 1980 32	Željezničar	0–0	Partizan	Sarajevo
				Attendance: 16,000

22 June 1980 33	Partizan	0–0	Crvena zvezda	Belgrade
				Stadium: Stadion JNA; Attendance: 50,000

29 June 1980 34	Hajduk Split	4–1	Partizan	Split
			Varga 86'	Attendance: 15,000

=== Yugoslav Cup ===
17 October 1979 Round of 32	Partizan	2–1	Hajduk Split	Belgrade

29 November 1979 Round of 16	Borac Banja Luka	1–2	Partizan	Banja Luka

5 March 1980 Quarter-finals	Partizan	1–1 (6–7 p)	Dinamo Zagreb	Belgrade
	Đelmaš 51'			Stadium: Stadion JNA; Attendance: 18,000; Referee: Tauzes (Ljubljana)

== See also ==
- List of FK Partizan seasons
