= 1968–69 FK Partizan season =

Partizan
1968–69 season
- President: Mića Lovrić
- Head coach: Stjepan Bobek
- Yugoslav First League: 3rd
- Yugoslav Cup: Semi-finals

The 1968–69 season was the 23rd season in FK Partizan's existence. This article shows player statistics and matches that the club played during the 1968–69 season.

== Competitions ==
=== Yugoslav First League ===
| Pos | Team | Pld | W | D | L | GF | GA | GD | Pts | Qualification or relegation |
|---|---|---|---|---|---|---|---|---|---|---|
| 1 | Red Star Belgrade (C) | 34 | 18 | 12 | 4 | 75 | 30 | +45 | 48 | Qualification for European Cup first round |
| 2 | Dinamo Zagreb | 34 | 20 | 5 | 9 | 75 | 33 | +42 | 45 | Qualification for Cup Winners' Cup first round |
| 3 | Partizan | 34 | 13 | 14 | 7 | 55 | 40 | +15 | 40 | Invitation for Inter-Cities Fairs Cup first round |
| 4 | Vojvodina | 34 | 15 | 9 | 10 | 42 | 44 | −2 | 39 | Invitation for Inter-Cities Fairs Cup first round |
| 5 | Željezničar | 34 | 15 | 8 | 11 | 51 | 38 | +13 | 38 | |

Source: rsssf.org
Rules for classification: 1) points; 2) goal difference; 3) number of goals scored.
(C) Champions

| 18 August 1968 1 | Proleter Zrenjanin | 0–0 | Partizan | Zrenjanin |
| | | | | Attendance: 15,000 |

| 25 August 1968 2 | Partizan | 3–0 | Bor | Belgrade |
| | Đorđić 30', 76'; Hošić 46' | | | Stadium: Stadion JNA; Attendance: 15,000; Referee: Rauš |

| 1 September 1968 3 | Hajduk Split | 1–1 | Partizan | Split |
| | Nadoveza 2' | | Hošić 60' | Stadium: Stadion Stari plac Attendance: 28,000; Referee: Jakše |

| 8 September 1968 4 | Partizan | 1–2 | OFK Beograd | Belgrade |
| | Katić 28' | | Stepanović 34'; Milutinović 69' | Stadium: Stadion JNA; Attendance: 30,000; Referee: Čanak |

| 15 September 1968 5 | Zagreb | 1–3 | Partizan | Zagreb |
| | Žutelija 80' | | Tošić 42', 48'; Hošić 49' | Attendance: 10,000; Referee: Tauzes |

| 22 September 1968 6 | Vojvodina | 1–1 | Partizan | Novi Sad |
| | | | Hošić 36' | Stadium: Karađorđe Stadium; Attendance: 15,000; Referee: Dopuđa (Sarajevo) |

| 29 September 1968 7 | Partizan | 2–1 | Željezničar | Belgrade |
| | Katić 13', 48' | | | Stadium: Stadion JNA; Attendance: 20,000; Referee: Horvat (Zagreb) |

| 6 October 1968 8 | Maribor | 4–1 | Partizan | Maribor |
| | | | Katić 74' | Stadium: Ljudski vrt Attendance: 7,000; Referee: Zaninović (Zadar) |

| 9 October 1968 9 | Partizan | 2–0 | Rijeka | Belgrade |
| | Hošić 25'; Vukotić 45' | | | Stadium: Stadion JNA; Attendance: 12,000; Referee: Pavičević (Kragujevac) |

| 19 October 1968 10 | Velež | 1–1 | Partizan | Mostar |
| | | | Bajić 75' | Stadium: Stadion pod Bijelim Brijegom; Attendance: 3,000; Referee: Tauzes (Ljubljana) |

| 30 October 1968 11 | Partizan | 4–1 | Čelik | Belgrade |
| | | | | Stadium: Stadion JNA; Attendance: 10,000; Referee: Kostovski (Skopje) |

| 3 November 1968 12 | Vardar | 1–2 | Partizan | Skopje |
| | | | Radaković 21'; Hošić 75' | Stadium: City Park Stadium; Attendance: 20,000 |

| 9 November 1968 13 | Partizan | 0–2 | Dinamo Zagreb | Belgrade |
| | | | | Stadium: Stadion JNA |

| 17 November 1968 14 | Crvena zvezda | 6–1 | Partizan | Belgrade |
| | Ostojić 15', 21', 60'; Pavlović 48'; Antonijević 51'; Džajić 87' | | Katić 24' | Stadium: Marakana; Attendance: 25,000; Referee: Škorić |

| 24 November 1968 15 | Partizan | 1–1 | Sarajevo | Belgrade |
| | Vukotić 26' | | Delalić 12' | Stadium: Stadion JNA |

| 1 December 1968 16 | Radnički Niš | 3–1 | Partizan | Niš |
| | | | Đorđić 32' | Stadium: Čair Stadium; Attendance: 5,000; Referee: Medić (Zagreb) |

| 7 December 1968 17 | Partizan | 0–0 | Olimpija | Belgrade |
| | | | | Stadium: Stadion JNA |

| 8 March 1969 18 | Partizan | 4–1 | Proleter Zrenjanin | Belgrade |
| | Hasanagić 18'; Hošić 32'; Smilevski 61'; Đorđić 85' | | | Stadium: Stadion JNA; Attendance: 15,000; Referee: Trpkovski (Skopje) |

| 16 March 1969 19 | Bor | 1–1 | Partizan | Bor |
| | | | Smilevski 5' | Stadium: Gradski stadion u Boru; Attendance: 10,000; Referee: Jakše |

| 23 March 1969 20 | Partizan | 2–1 | Hajduk Split | Belgrade |
| | Kovačević 63'; Hošić 70' | | | Stadium: Stadion JNA; Attendance: 20,000; Referee: Horvat |

| 29 March 1969 21 | OFK Beograd | 0–5 | Partizan | Belgrade |
| | | | Vukotić 8'; Katić 35'; Hošić 42'; Vidović 53'; Petrović 57' | Stadium: Stadion JNA; Attendance: 9,000; Referee: Botić (Beograd) |

| 6 April 1969 22 | Partizan | 3–0 | Zagreb | Belgrade |
| | Petrović 29'; Katić 55'; Vukotić 73' | | | Stadium: Stadion JNA; Attendance: 15,000; Referee: Dopuđa (Sarajevo) |

| 13 April 1969 23 | Partizan | 5–0 | Vojvodina | Belgrade |
| | Đorđić; Vukotić; Katić | | | Stadium: Stadion JNA; Attendance: 18,000; Referee: Trpkovski (Skopje) |

| 20 April 1969 24 | Željezničar | 0–0 | Partizan | Sarajevo |
| | | | | Stadium: City Stadium Koševo; Attendance: 25,000; Referee: Radulović (Titograd) |

| 3 May 1969 25 | Partizan | 4–1 | Maribor | Belgrade |
| | Hošić; Vukotić; Kovačević pen.' | | | Stadium: Stadion JNA; Attendance: 12,000; Referee: Strmečki (Zagreb) |

| 7 May 1969 26 | Rijeka | 3–0 | Partizan | Rijeka |
| | | | | Stadium: Stadion Kantrida; Attendance: 5,000; Referee: Gugić (Niš) |

| 11 May 1969 27 | Partizan | 2–0 | Velež | Belgrade |
| | Kovačević 29' (pen.); Olarević 40' | | | Stadium: Stadion JNA; Attendance: 10,000; Referee: Gugić (Niš) |

| 18 May 1969 28 | Čelik | 0–0 | Partizan | Zenica |
| | | | | Stadium: Bilino Polje; Attendance: 14,000; Referee: Medić (Zagreb) |

| 24 May 1969 29 | Partizan | 1–1 | Vardar | Belgrade |
| | Katić 12' | | | Stadium: Marakana*; Referee: Pavićević (Kragujevac) |

| 8 June 1969 30 | Dinamo Zagreb | 3–0 | Partizan | Zagreb |
| | | | | Stadium: Stadion Maksimir; Attendance: 13,976; Referee: Dopuđa (Sarajevo) |

| 15 June 1969 31 | Partizan | 2–2 | Crvena zvezda | Belgrade |
| | Kovačević 33'; Đorđić 84' | | Lazarević 55', 65' | Stadium: Stadion JNA; Attendance: 50,000 |

| 22 June 1969 32 | Sarajevo | 0–0 | Partizan | Sarajevo |
| | | | | Stadium: City Stadium Koševo |

| 29 June 1969 33 | Partizan | 1–1 | Radnički Niš | Belgrade |
| | Đorđić 25' | | | Stadium: Stadion JNA; Attendance: 6,000; Referee: Medić (Zagreb) |

| 6 July 1969 34 | Olimpija | 1–1 | Partizan | Ljubljana |
| | | | Kovačević 45' | Stadium: Bežigrad Stadium; Referee: Strmečki (Zagreb) |

=== Yugoslav Cup ===
| 2 March 1969 Round of 16 | Budućnost | 2–3 (a.e.t.) | Partizan | Titograd |
| | | | Hasanagić 20'; Kovačević 50'; Katić 105' | Stadium: Podgorica City Stadium; Attendance: 15,000; Referee: Gugulović |

| 13 March 1969 Quarter-finals | Partizan | 2–1 | Rijeka | Belgrade |
| | Kovačević 50'; Katić 74' | | | Stadium: JNA Stadium; Attendance: 10,000; Referee: Horvat (Zagreb) |

| 16 April 1969 Semi-finals | Partizan | 0–0 (2–4 p) | Dinamo Zagreb | Belgrade |
| | | | | Stadium: JNA Stadium; Attendance: 45,000; Referee: Gugulović (Niš) |

== See also ==
- List of FK Partizan seasons
