= Mihaly Meszaros =

Mihaly Meszaros may refer to:

- Michu Meszaros (1939–2016), Hungarian-born American actor
- Mihalj Mesaroš (1935–2017), Yugoslav/Serbian footballer who also played for American teams
