= 1952 Yugoslav Cup =

1952 Yugoslav Football Cup
6th Marshal Tito Cup

Tournament details
- Country: Yugoslavia
- Dates: 24 August – 29 November
- Teams: 32

Final positions
- Champions: Partizan (2nd title)
- Runners-up: Red Star

Tournament statistics
- Matches played: 31
- Goals scored: 138 (4.45 per match)
- Goals scored in penalty shoot-outs not included.

The 1952 Yugoslav Cup was the 6th season of the top football knockout competition in SFR Yugoslavia, the Yugoslav Cup (Serbo-Croatian: Kup Jugoslavije), also known as the "Marshal Tito Cup" (Kup Maršala Tita), since its establishment in 1946.

== Round of 32 ==
In the following tables winning teams are marked in bold; teams from outside top level are marked in italic script.

Tie no	Home team	Score	Away team
1	Radnički Sombor	1–3	**Red Star**
2	**Partizan**	2–1	BSK Belgrade
3	Dinamo Zagreb	2–3	**Odred Ljubljana**
4	Metalac Zagreb	0–2	**Sarajevo**
5	**Vojvodina**	2–0	Vardar
6	**Hajduk Split**	4–2	Lokomotiva Zagreb
7	**Radnički Niš**	2–1	Mesarski Zagreb
8	**Borac Banja Luka**	4–2	NK Zagreb
9	**Proleter Ravno Selo**	3–2 (a.e.t.)	Garnizon JNA Skopje
10	Sloboda Đakovo	1–3 (a.e.t.)	**Jedinstvo Zemun**
11	Slavija Beograd	4–5 (a.e.t.)	**Garnizon JNA Požarevac**
12	**Lovćen Cetinje**	2–0	Srem Sremska Mitrovica
13	Radnički Kikinda	0–4	**Velež**
14	**Jedinstvo Čakovec**	3–1	Proleter Zrenjanin
15	Solin	0–1 (a.e.t.)	**Rudar Trbovlje**
16	**Kvarner Rijeka**	0–0 (4–3 p)	Proleter Osijek

== Round of 16 ==
Tie no	Home team	Score	Away team
1	Velež	1–3	**Red Star**
2	**Kvarner Rijeka**	1–0	Vojvodina
3	**Garnizon JNA Požarevac**	3–2	Odred Ljubljana
4	**Sarajevo**	7–0	Jedinstvo Čakovec
5	Lovćen Cetinje	0–3	**Partizan**
6	**Hajduk Split**	3–1	Borac Banja Luka
7	Jedinstvo Zemun	1–2	**Proleter Ravno Selo**
8	Rudar Trbovlje	2–3	**Radnički Niš**

== Quarter-finals ==
Tie no	Home team	Score	Away team
1	**Red Star**	8–1	Kvarner Rijeka
2	Garnizon JNA Požarevac	2–3	**Sarajevo**
3	**Partizan**	5–0 (a.e.t.)	Hajduk Split
4	Proleter Ravno Selo	2–6	**Radnički Niš**

== Semi-finals ==
Tie no	Home team	Score	Away team
1	**Red Star**	6–2	Sarajevo
2	**Partizan**	4–1	Radnički Niš

== Final ==
29 November 1952

Partizan	6–0	Red Star
Valok 13', 35'; Zebec 25', 49'; Bobek 80'; Veselinović 85'

JNA Stadium, Belgrade
Attendance: 50,000
Referee: Vasa Stefanović (Belgrade)

PARTIZAN:
GK	1	(Socialist Federal Republic of Yugoslavia) Slavko Stojanović
DF	2	(Socialist Federal Republic of Yugoslavia) Bruno Belin
DF	3	(Socialist Federal Republic of Yugoslavia) Ratko Čolić
DF	4	(Socialist Federal Republic of Yugoslavia) Zlatko Čajkovski
DF	5	(Socialist Federal Republic of Yugoslavia) Vojo Stefanović
	6	(Socialist Federal Republic of Yugoslavia) Miodrag Jovanović
	7	(Socialist Federal Republic of Yugoslavia) Marko Valok
	8	(Socialist Federal Republic of Yugoslavia) Todor Veselinović
	9	(Socialist Federal Republic of Yugoslavia) Stjepan Bobek
	10	(Socialist Federal Republic of Yugoslavia) Aleksandar Atanacković
	11	(Socialist Federal Republic of Yugoslavia) Branko Zebec
Manager:
(Socialist Federal Republic of Yugoslavia) Antun Pogačnik

RED STAR:
GK	1	(Socialist Federal Republic of Yugoslavia) Srboljub Krivokuća
	2	(Socialist Federal Republic of Yugoslavia) Branko Stanković
	3	(Socialist Federal Republic of Yugoslavia) Miljan Zeković
	4	(Socialist Federal Republic of Yugoslavia) Siniša Zlatković
	5	(Socialist Federal Republic of Yugoslavia) Milorad Diskić
	6	(Socialist Federal Republic of Yugoslavia) Predrag Đajić
	7	(Socialist Federal Republic of Yugoslavia) Kosta Tomašević
	8	(Socialist Federal Republic of Yugoslavia) Rajko Mitić
	9	(Socialist Federal Republic of Yugoslavia) Tihomir Ognjanov
	10	(Socialist Federal Republic of Yugoslavia) Todor Živanović
	11	(Socialist Federal Republic of Yugoslavia) Branislav Vukosavljević
Manager:
(Socialist Federal Republic of Yugoslavia) Branislav Sekulić

== See also ==
- 1952 Yugoslav First League
- 1952 Yugoslav Second League
