= Milutin Pajević =

Montenegrin footballer and manager

Personal information
- Full name: Milutin Pajević
- Date of birth: 11 November 1920
- Place of birth: Cetinje, Kingdom of SCS
- Date of death: 28 December 1992 (aged 72)
- Position: Striker

Senior career*
Years	Team	Apps	(Gls)
1935–1937	Crnogorac Cetinje		
1937–1938	Jedinstvo Beograd		
1939–1941	HAŠK		
1941–1943	Bata Borovo		
1946	Lovćen		
1946	Željezničar		
1947	Budućnost		
1951	Partizan	19	(4)
1951–1954	Budućnost		
1954–1956	Lovćen		

International career
1949	Yugoslavia	3	(3)

Managerial career
- 1955: Željezničar
- * Club domestic league appearances and goals

Milutin "Mišo" Pajević (Cyrillic: Милутин Мишо Пajeвић; 11 November 1920 – 28 December 1992) was a Montenegrin football player and manager. Also known as Miloš Pajević, he had three caps for the Yugoslavia national team and played for a number of major clubs in Yugoslavia.

== International career ==
Pajević made his debut for Yugoslavia in an August 1949 FIFA World Cup qualification match against Israel, immediately scoring a hattrick, and has earned a total of 3 caps, scoring 3 goals. His final international was an October 1949 World Cup qualification match against France.

== International goals ==
No.	Date	Venue	Opponent	Score	Result	Competition
1.	21 August 1949	Belgrade, Yugoslavia	Israel	1–0	6–0	1950 FIFA World Cup qualification
2.	21 August 1949	Belgrade, Yugoslavia	Israel	2–0	6–0	1950 FIFA World Cup qualification
3.	21 August 1949	Belgrade, Yugoslavia	Israel	3–0	6–0	1950 FIFA World Cup qualification
