= Dragoljub Blažić =

Yugoslav footballer

Personal information
- Full name: Dragoljub Blažić
- Date of birth: 5 October 1938
- Place of birth: Skopje, Kingdom of Yugoslavia
- Date of death: 1 January 1991 (aged 52)
- Position: Midfielder

Youth career
- 1953–1954: Vojvodina

Senior career*
Years	Team	Apps	(Gls)
1954–1957	Vojvodina		
1957–1959	Partizan	29	(8)
1959–1961	Dinamo Zagreb	17	(5)
- * Club domestic league appearances and goals

Dragoljub Blažić (Serbian Cyrillic: Драгољуб Блажић, also referred to as Dragan; 5 October 1938 – 1991) was a Yugoslav footballer.

== Career ==
Born in Skopje, he started playing in 1953 in the youth levels of FK Vojvodina where, after two years, aged only 16, he debuted for the senior team. In 1957 he made news with his transfer to FK Partizan where he played until summer 1959. Then, he joins Dinamo Zagreb where he played until the end of the 1960–61 season. Playing mostly as left-wing, he won with Dinamo Zagreb the 1960 Yugoslav Cup. He was known for great technic skills and was an excellent dribbler.
