= Božidar Kolaković =

Personal information
- Full name: Božidar Kolaković
- Date of birth: 8 December 1929
- Place of birth: Sisak, Yugoslavia
- Date of death: 17 October 2010 (aged 80)
- Place of death: Offenbach am Main, Germany
- Position: Defender

Senior career*
Years	Team	Apps	(Gls)
1946–1949	Lokomotiva Zagreb		
1950–1954	Partizan	44	(1)
1955–1957	Proleter Osijek		
1957–1959	Hajduk Kula		

International career
1951	Yugoslavia	1	(0)
- * Club domestic league appearances and goals

Božidar Kolaković (Cyrillic: Божидар Колаковић; 8 December 1929 – 17 October 2010) was a footballer most notably with FK Partizan and in the Yugoslavia national team.

== International career ==
He made his debut for Yugoslavia in a February 1951 friendly match away against France, which remained his sole international appearance.
