= Branislav Mihajlović =

Serbian footballer

Personal information
- Date of birth: 22 December 1936
- Place of birth: Vranje, Kingdom of Yugoslavia
- Date of death: 11 October 1991 (aged 54)
- Place of death: Belgrade, SFR Yugoslavia
- Positions: Forward; left wing

Youth career
- Napredak Kruševac

Senior career*
Years	Team	Apps	(Gls)
1955–1965	Partizan	286	(183)
1965–1966	Paris Union		
1966–1967	OFK Beograd	4	(0)

International career
	Yugoslavia U20	4	(0)
	Yugoslavia U21	2	(0)
1959–1960	Yugoslavia	8	(4)
- * Club domestic league appearances and goals

Branislav Mihajlović (Serbian Cyrillic: Бранислав Михајловић, 22 December 1936 – 11 October 1991) was a Serbian footballer who played nearly his entire career for FK Partizan.

== Playing career ==
=== Club career ===
Mihajlović is tenth on Partizan's all-time goals list with 183 goals in total (appearing in 286 games in total).

=== International career ===
He earned eight caps and scored four goals for the Yugoslavia national team. His final international was a January 1960 friendly match away against Egypt
