= Josip Pirmajer =

Slovenian footballer (1944–2018)

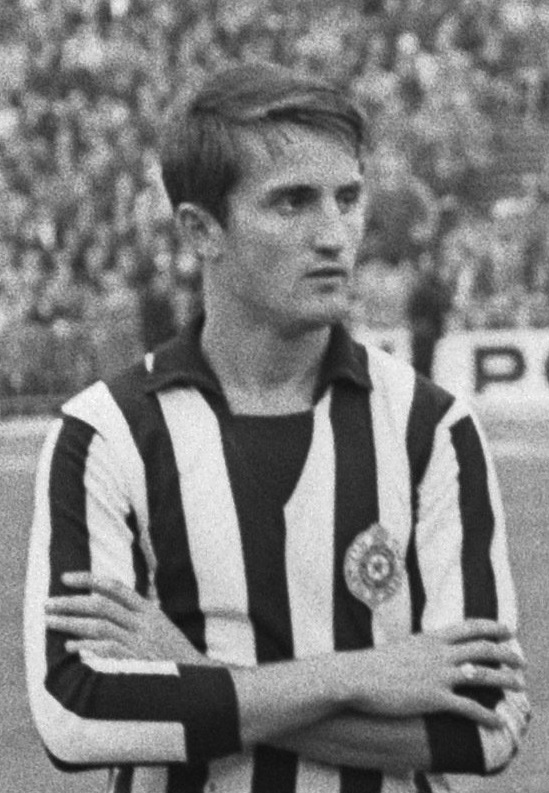
- Pirmajer ahead of Partizan's 1966 European Cup Final versus Real Madrid

Personal information
- Date of birth: 14 February 1944
- Place of birth: Trifail, Nazi-occupied Slovenia
- Date of death: 24 June 2018 (aged 74)
- Place of death: Srbobran, Serbia
- Height: 1.84 m (6 ft 0 in)
- Position: Winger

Youth career
- Elan Srbobran

Senior career*
Years	Team	Apps	(Gls)
1960–1963	Novi Sad	44	(7)
1964–1968	Partizan	121	(28)
1968–1972	Vojvodina	81	(15)
1972–1975	Nîmes	60	(5)
1975–1977	Novi Sad	35	(7)

International career
1964	Yugoslavia	4	(0)

Managerial career
- Novi Sad
- Jedinstvo Novi Bečej
- 1997–1998: Vojvodina
- Bečej
- Elan Srbobran
- Beograd
- 2006: Sileks
- Big Bull Bačinci
- 2011: Sloga Erdevik
Medal record
Men's Football
Representing Yugoslavia
Mediterranean Games
Gold medal – first place	1971 Izmir	Team
- * Club domestic league appearances and goals

Josip Pirmajer (14 February 1944 – 24 June 2018) was a Yugoslav football player and manager who played as a winger. At international level, he represented the Yugoslavia national team.

== Playing career ==
=== Club ===
Pirmajer was born in Trbovlje in present-day Slovenia. At the time of his birth, Trbovlje was renamed Trifail by the occupying Nazi German forces. He moved with his family to Serbia to Srbobran in 1947. His football skills were spotted while he was in elementary school and he joined the youth-team of Elan Srbobran. When he was 16, with a special medical permission, he was allowed to start playing in the main team of Elan Srbobran. After a handful of games he attracted attention from bigger clubs, and shortly after he joined RFK Novi Sad. He debuted in the season 1960–61 in which Novi Sad made their historical promotion to the Yugoslav First League after winning the 1960–61 Yugoslav Second League East. Pirmajer played the following 2 1/2 seasons with Novi Sad in the First League, until the winter-break of the 1963–64 season when he was brought by FK Partizan. Pirmajer moved to the capital and played with Partizan a total of 4 1/2 seasons during which he won one championship and was European vice-champion after losing the 1966 European Cup final. During his spell in Partizan he got the record of having played 252 consecutive competitive matches.

In summer 1967 Pirmajer returned to Novi Sad this time joining FK Vojvodina where he played further four seasons in Yugoslav top-flight. Afterwards, he played 2 1/2 seasons abroad, in France, with Nîmes Olympique in League 1. During the 1974–75 winter break, Pirmajer returned to Yugoslavia and, aged 30, he joined his former club RFK Novi Sad playing with them until summer 1977 in the Yugoslav Second League.

=== International ===
Pirmajer played for all youth levels of the Yugoslavia national team, including the Olympic team, before debuting for Yugoslavia national team in 1964. He made four appearances for Yugoslavia.

== Managerial career ==
After retiring, Pirmajer became a coach and he worked at RFK Novi Sad, FK Jedinstvo Novi Bečej, FK Vojvodina, FK Elan Srbobran, FK Beograd, FK Sileks, FK Big Bull Bačinci and FK Bečej.

Pirmajer continued living in Serbia where he became president of FK Srbobran.

In January 2009, the Sports Association of the municipality of Srbobran gave Pirmajer a special award as recognition of him as the most successful sportsman from Srboobran and for his overall contribution for development of sport in the municipality. As well as being an excellent footballer, Pirmajer played also handball with RK Bačka, basketball with KK Akademik, and table tennis.

== Death ==
Pirmajer died on 24 June 2018 in Srbobran, Serbia at the age of 74.

== Honours ==
Novi Sad

- Yugoslav Second League

Partizan

- Yugoslav First League: 1964–65
- European Cup: 1965–66 finalist

== Notes ==
1. Now Trbovlje, Slovenia.
