= Vasilije Šijaković =

Montenegrin footballer

Personal information
- Full name: Vasilije Šijaković
- Date of birth: 31 July 1929
- Place of birth: Nikšić, Kingdom of Yugoslavia
- Date of death: 10 November 2003 (aged 74)
- Place of death: Belgrade, Serbia and Montenegro
- Position: Defender

Youth career
- 1946–1950: Partizan

Senior career*
Years	Team	Apps	(Gls)
1950–1952	Partizan	10	(5)
1952–1954	Red Star Belgrade	16	(2)
1954–1962	OFK Belgrade	142	(22)
1962–1963	FC Grenoble	9	(3)
Total		187	(34)

International career
1957–1962	Yugoslavia	11	(0)
- * Club domestic league appearances and goals

Vasilije Šijaković (Montenegrin Cyrillic: Василије Шијаковић; 31 July 1929 – 10 November 2003) was a Montenegrin footballer who played as a defender. He played at two World Cup Finals tournaments for Yugoslavia.

== Club career ==
At club level, he played for the major domestic clubs, FK Partizan, Red Star Belgrade, OFK Belgrade and French Grenoble Foot 38.

== International career ==
Šijaković made his debut for Yugoslavia in a November 1957 FIFA World Cup qualification match against Romania and has earned a total of 11 caps, scoring no goals. His final international was a June 1962 FIFA World Cup Finals match against Czechoslovakia.
