= Milan Vukelić =

Serbian footballer

Personal information
- Full name: Milan Vukelić
- Date of birth: 2 January 1936
- Place of birth: Novi Sad, Kingdom of Yugoslavia
- Date of death: 4 September 2012 (aged 76)
- Place of death: Belgrade, Serbia
- Position: Midfielder

Youth career
- Poštar

Senior career*
Years	Team	Apps	(Gls)
1955–1957	Vojvodina	25	(10)
1958–1969	Partizan	153	(29)
Total		178	(39)

International career
1957–1964	Yugoslavia	3	(0)
- * Club domestic league appearances and goals

Milan Vukelić (Serbian Cyrillic: Милан Вукелић; 2 January 1936 – 4 September 2012) was a Serbian footballer. He played the majority of his career for Serbian giants Partizan, whom he also captained for some time.

Vukelić was capped three times by Yugoslavia, in friendly matches in 1957, 1962 and 1964.

== Honours ==
Partizan

- Yugoslav First League: 1960–61, 1961–62, 1962–63, 1964–65
