= Dragan Mance =

Yugoslav footballer

Personal information
- Full name: Dragan Mance
- Date of birth: 26 September 1962
- Place of birth: Zemun, PR Serbia, FPR Yugoslavia
- Date of death: 3 September 1985 (aged 22)
- Place of death: Zemun, SR Serbia, SFR Yugoslavia
- Height: 1.83 m (6 ft 0 in)
- Position: Striker

Youth career
- 1977–1980: Galenika Zemun

Senior career*
Years	Team	Apps	(Gls)
1980	Galenika Zemun	2	(0)
1980–1985	Partizan	117	(42)
Total		119	(42)

International career
1982–1984	Yugoslavia U21	5	(4)
1983	Yugoslavia	4	(0)
- * Club domestic league appearances and goals

Dragan Mance (Serbian Cyrillic: Драган Манце, pronounced [drǎgan mǎntse]; 26 September 1962 – 3 September 1985) was a Serbian and Yugoslav footballer who played as a striker. He spent the majority of his career at Partizan, earning a legendary status among the club's supporters. Mance died in a car accident while traveling to a training session, at age 22.

== Club career ==
Mance started out at his local club Galenika Zemun, joining them at the relatively late age of 15. He quickly showed his promising talent, making his senior debut in the Yugoslav Second League at the age of 17. In September 1980, Mance was transferred to Partizan in exchange for experienced striker Slobodan Santrač who moved in the opposite direction.

Mance made his league debut for Partizan on 22 November 1980 in a 1–1 home draw with Sarajevo, coming on as a second-half substitute. He made five more league appearances until the end of the 1980–81 season. On 12 August 1981, Mance scored his first league goal for the club in a 1–0 home win over Radnički Niš. He finished the 1981–82 campaign with five goals in 21 league appearances. Mance was the team's leading scorer in the 1982–83 season, helping them win the Yugoslav First League after five years. He made 28 league appearances and scored eight goals in the following 1983–84 campaign.

In 1984–85, Mance again finished as the club's top scorer. He is arguably best remembered for scoring a spectacular long-range goal away at Queens Park Rangers in the first leg of the UEFA Cup second round. Despite a 2–6 loss at Highbury, Partizan progressed to the next round after defeating them 4–0 in the return leg at home. Mance scored the opening goal of the match that was placed 70th on the list of the "Top 100 Greatest Matches" by Eurosport in 2009.

In the summer of 1985, after much speculation, Mance signed a new four-year contract with Partizan which would keep him at the club until 1989. He eventually played his last match on 1 September 1985, scoring the team's second goal from the penalty spot to give Partizan a 2–1 home league win over Budućnost Titograd.

== International career ==
At international level, Mance was capped four times for Yugoslavia. He made his national team debut on 23 April 1983 in a friendly against France, a 4–0 away loss. His last cap came in November of the same year in another friendly versus France, a 0–0 home draw.

== Death ==
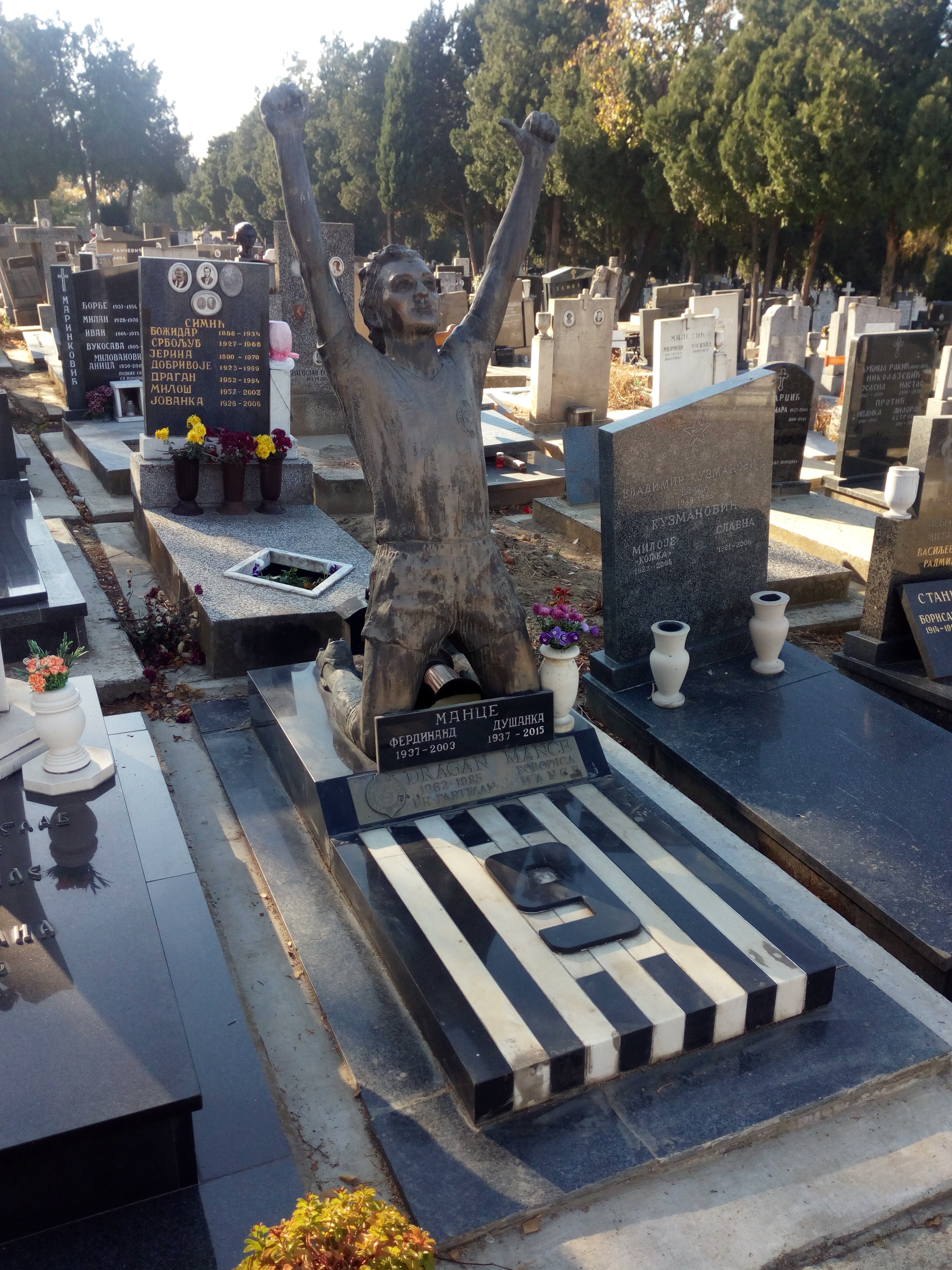
Mance's tomb at Belgrade New Cemetery

Mance died on 3 September 1985 in a car accident on the road while driving in his Peugeot 205 to the team's training session. He was buried at Belgrade New Cemetery. His funeral was attended by 30,000 people. Mance was survived by his parents, Ferdinand and Dušanka, and younger brother, Goran.

== Career statistics ==
=== Club ===
Appearances and goals by club, season and competition
Club	Season	League			Continental		Total	
Club	Season	Division	Apps	Goals	Apps	Goals	Apps	Goals
Galenika Zemun	1979–80	Yugoslav Second League	1	0	—		1	0
Galenika Zemun	1980–81	Yugoslav Second League	1	0	—		1	0
Galenika Zemun	Total		2	0	—		2	0
Partizan	1980–81	Yugoslav First League	6	0	—		6	0
Partizan	1981–82	Yugoslav First League	21	5	—		21	5
Partizan	1982–83	Yugoslav First League	30	15	—		30	15
Partizan	1983–84	Yugoslav First League	28	8	4	0	32	8
Partizan	1984–85	Yugoslav First League	27	12	6	3	33	15
Partizan	1985–86	Yugoslav First League	5	2	0	0	5	2
Partizan	Total		117	42	10	3	127	45
Career total			119	42	10	3	129	45

=== International ===
Appearances and goals by national team and year
National team	Year	Apps	Goals
Yugoslavia	1983	4	0
Total		4	0

== Honours ==
Partizan

- Yugoslav First League: 1982–83
