= Antun Pogačnik =

Croatian footballer

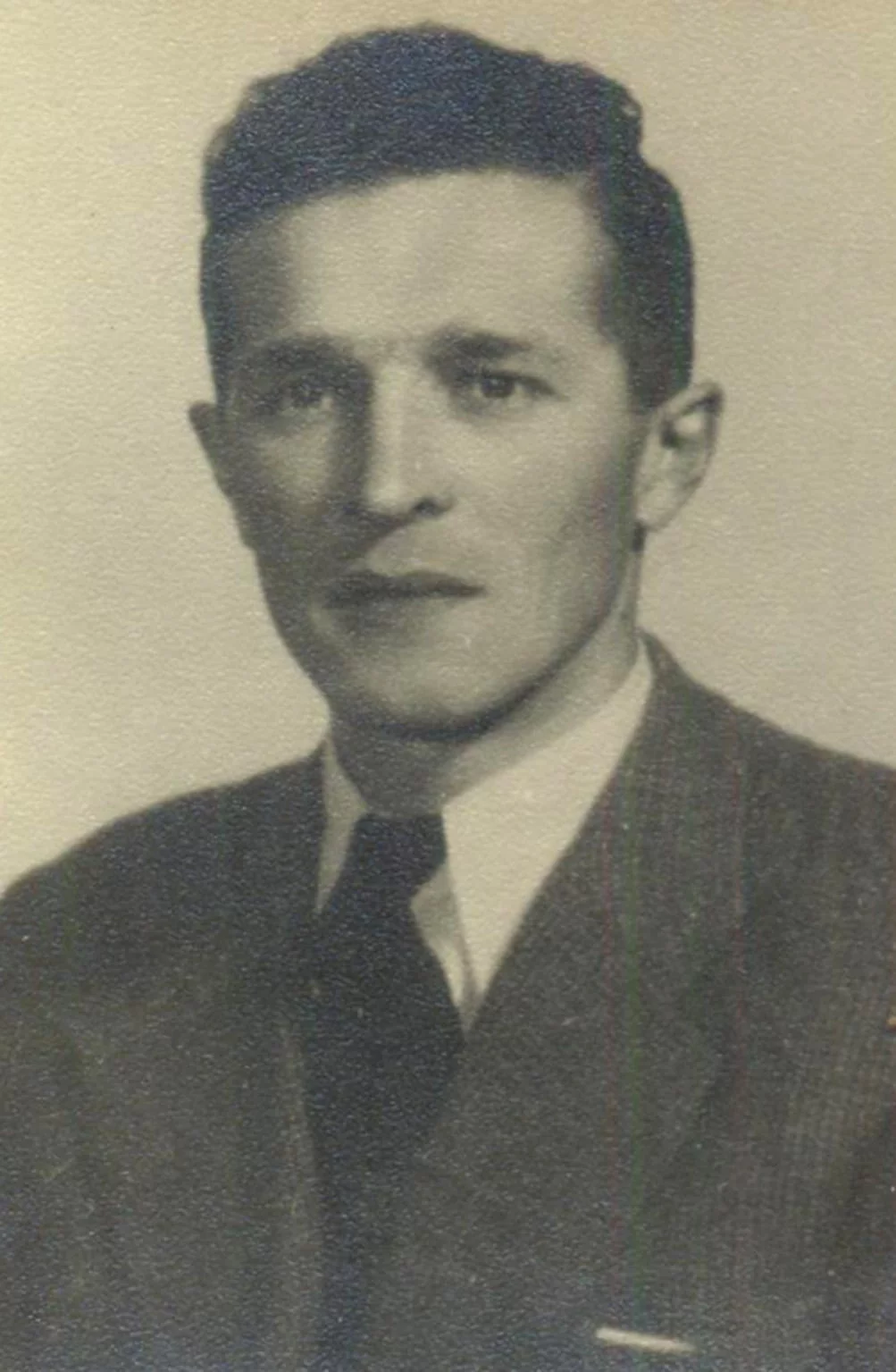
- Pogačnik in 1952

Personal information
- Date of birth: 6 January 1913
- Place of birth: Livno, Condominium of Bosnia and Herzegovina, Austria-Hungary
- Date of death: 1 May 1978 (aged 65)
- Place of death: Bali, Indonesia
- Position: Midfielder

Senior career*
| Years | Team | Apps | (Gls) |
| 1931–1933 | SAŠK Sarajevo | | |
| 1934–1938 | Građanski Zagreb | 36 | (9) |
| 1938–1941 | Concordia Zagreb | | |

International career
| 1937 | Yugoslavia | 2 | (0) |
| 1941 | Independent State of Croatia | 1 | (0) |

Managerial career
- 1947–1949: Metalac Zagreb
- 1952–1953: Partizan
- 1954–1963: Indonesia
- 1958–1960: Grasshopper Club Zürich
- * Club domestic league appearances and goals

Antun "Toni" Pogačnik (6 January 1913 – 21 May 1978) was a Croatian footballer who played for both Yugoslavia and Croatia. He is notable for being a manager of Indonesia between 1954 and 1963 and is considered one of the best in the history of the Indonesia national team.

== Playing career ==
=== Club ===
Pogačnik started his football career in SAŠK Sarajevo in 1931. In 1934 he was transferred to Građanski Zagreb and then in 1938 to Concordia Zagreb where he ended his club career.

=== International ===
Pogačnik played two matches for Yugoslavia, one against Turkey (3–1) and the other against Romania (2–1). Both matches were played in Belgrade. He also played one match for the Independent State of Croatia, a World War II-era puppet state of Nazi Germany. against Nazi Germany in Vienna on 15 June 1941 (1–5).

== Managerial career ==
Pogačnik led arguably the most successful Indonesia national team. Under him, Indonesia held the Soviet Union to a 0–0 draw in the 1956 Melbourne Olympics quarter final game before losing 0–4 in the replay two days later. It was a strong Soviet team captained by the great Lev Yashin which then went on to win the gold medal.

As the Dutch East Indies, Indonesia competed in the 1938 World Cup but since then has not appeared in a world tournament at a senior level. Antun Pogačnik is the only coach who has been able to take the Indonesia national team to the Olympic Games. He is remembered very fondly in Indonesian football circles. He later became a manager, with Metalac Zagreb, FK Partizan, Grasshopper Club Zürich.

== Honours ==
=== Player ===
Građanski Zagreb

- Kingdom of Yugoslavia Championship: 1936–37
- Kingdom of Yugoslavia Cup: 1937-38
- Zagreb Subassociation Cup: 1934-35, 1935–36

=== Manager ===
Indonesia

- 1958 Asian Games Bronze Medal
