= Idriz Hošić =

Yugoslav footballer

Personal information
- Date of birth: 17 February 1944 (age 82)
- Place of birth: Prijedor, Independent State of Croatia (now Bosnia and Herzegovina)
- Height: 1.82 m (6 ft 0 in)
- Position: Forward

Senior career*
Years	Team	Apps	(Gls)
1960–1963	Željezničar Prijedor		
1963–1966	Famos Hrasnica		
1966–1970	Partizan	73	(36)
1970–1973	1. FC Kaiserslautern	74	(31)
1973–1974	MSV Duisburg	11	(1)
1974–1975	Westfalia Herne	17	(3)

International career
1968	Yugoslavia	2	(0)
Medal record
Men's Football
Representing Yugoslavia
European Championship
Silver medal – second place	1968 Italy	Team
- * Club domestic league appearances and goals

Idriz Hošić (born 17 February 1944) is a Bosnian retired footballer. He participated in UEFA Euro 1968.

== Club career ==
During his club career, he played for NK Famos Hrasnica, FK Partizan, 1. FC Kaiserslautern and MSV Duisburg.

== International career ==
Hošić played for Yugoslavia in the 1968 UEFA European Football Championship. In April, he debuted in a friendly match away against Czechoslovakia and earned a total of 2 caps, scoring no goals. His only other international match was in June, against Italy.
