= Slobodan Pavković =

Serbian football manager and player

Personal information
- Date of birth: 24 October 1955 (age 71)
- Place of birth: Novi Sad, PR Serbia, FPR Yugoslavia
- Position: Midfielder

Youth career
- 1970–1974: Vojvodina

Senior career*
Years	Team	Apps	(Gls)
1974–1978	Vojvodina	124	(10)
1978–1983	Partizan	50	(3)
1983	Galenika Zemun	14	(1)
1984–1987	Degerfors IF		
Total		188	(14)

International career
1974	Yugoslavia U18	7	(1)
1977–1978	Yugoslavia U21	6	(0)

Managerial career
- 1996–2000: Kuwait SC
- 2000–2001: Radnički Niš
- 2001–2002: Vojvodina
- 2002–2003: Serbia and Montenegro U19
- 2003–2004: Ruwi
- 2004–2005: Al-Nasr
- 2005: Kuwait
- 2006: Al Ittihad
- 2015: Fanja
- 2020-2021: Oman (TD)
Medal record
Gold medal – first place	UEFA Under-21 Championship	1978
Silver medal – second place	UEFA Under-18 Championship	1974
- * Club domestic league appearances and goals

Slobodan Pavković (Serbian Cyrillic: Слободан Павковић, pronounced [slobǒdan pǎːʋkoʋitɕ]; born 24 October 1955) is a Serbian former football manager and player.

== Club career ==
Born in Novi Sad, Pavković started out at his hometown club Vojvodina, making his Yugoslav First League debut in 1974. He helped the team win the 1976–77 Mitropa Cup. In 1978, Pavković was signed by Partizan, spending the next five seasons with the Belgrade club. He made two appearances in the title-winning 1982–83 season. After a brief spell at Galenika Zemun in the Yugoslav Second League, Pavković moved abroad to Sweden and joined Degerfors IF.

== International career ==
At international level, Pavković played for the Yugoslavia under-18s at the 1974 UEFA European Under-18 Championship, where they lost 1–0 in the final to Bulgaria. He was later a member of the Yugoslavia under-21 team that won the 1978 UEFA European Under-21 Championship.

== Managerial career ==
After hanging up his boots, Pavković was manager of several clubs in the Middle East. He also served as manager of the Kuwait national football team in 2005.

Between 2008 and 2014, Pavković served as technical director of the Football Association of Singapore (FAS). He later worked as technical director at the Oman Football association.

== Personal life ==
A childhood friend of Đorđe Balašević, Pavković was a guitarist for the Novi Sad-based rock band Rani Mraz in the late 1970s.

== Honours ==
=== Player ===
Vojvodina

- Mitropa Cup: 1976–77

Partizan

- Yugoslav First League: 1982–83

=== Manager ===
Ruwi

- Sultan Qaboos Cup: 2003

Fanja

- Oman Professional League Cup: 2014–15
