= Mihalj Mesaroš =

Yugoslav/Serbian footballer

Personal information
- Date of birth: 27 July 1935
- Place of birth: Novi Bečej, Kingdom of Yugoslavia
- Date of death: 18 April 2017 (aged 81)
- Place of death: United States
- Position: Forward

Senior career*
Years	Team	Apps	(Gls)
19xx–19xx	Jedinstvo Novi Bečej		
19xx–1953	Proleter Zrenjanin		
1954–1960	Partizan	38	(7)
1960–1964	Sloboda Tuzla		
1965	Trikala	8	(5)
1965–1966	Rijeka	0	(0)
1966	Sloboda Tuzla		
1967	Los Angeles Toros	16	(3)
1968	San Diego Toros	32	(9)
1968–1969	Rijeka	0	(0)
1970–1971	Proleter Zrenjanin		
1974	San Jose Earthquakes	4	(1)
- * Club domestic league appearances and goals

Mihalj Mesaroš (Serbian Cyrillic: Михаљ Месарош, Hungarian: Mészáros Mihály; 27 July 1935 – 18 April 2017) was a Yugoslav/Serbian footballer.

== Career ==
Born in Novi Bečej and nicknamed "Meske" he started his career at local side FK Jedinstvo Novi Bečej from where he moved to FK Proleter Zrenjanin playing back then in the Yugoslav Second League. Then he moves to the capital Belgrade and joins FK Partizan. He played 127 games and scored 57 goals for the black&whites, 43 games and 10 goals in the Yugoslav First League. Next he played for NK Rijeka and FK Sloboda Tuzla. In 1968, he moved to the United States and played with Los Angeles Toros in the NPSL, and next season the club changed its name to San Diego Toros and played in the NASL. Afterwards he returned to Yugoslavia and in 1974 he was back to the United States, this time playing with San Jose Earthquakes in the NASL.
