= Aleksandar Atanacković (footballer, born 1920) =

Serbian footballer

Personal information
- Full name: Aleksandar Atanacković
- Date of birth: 29 April 1920
- Place of birth: Belgrade, Kingdom of Serbs, Croats and Slovenes
- Date of death: 12 March 2005 (aged 84)
- Position: Midfielder

Senior career*
Years	Team	Apps	(Gls)
1937–1940	SK Jugoslavija	29	(3)
1946–1954	Partizan	111	(12)

International career
1946–1950	Yugoslavia	15	(1)

Managerial career
- 1964: Partizan
- 1965–1966: Sarajevo
- 1967–1968: Budućnost Titograd
Medal record
Men's Football
Representing Yugoslavia
Olympic Games
Silver medal – second place	1948 London	Team
- * Club domestic league appearances and goals

Aleksandar Atanacković (29 April 1920 – 12 March 2005) was a Yugoslav football manager and player. His first name has also been written as Aleksa.

== International career ==
Atanacković made his debut for Yugoslavia in a September 1946 friendly match against Czechoslovakia and earned a total of 15 caps, scoring 1 goal. He was a participant at the 1948 Summer Olympics and the 1950 FIFA World Cup and his final international was a June 1950 friendly away against Switzerland.
