= Marko Valok =

Serbian footballer (1927–2024)

Personal information
- Date of birth: 5 March 1927
- Place of birth: Surčin, Kingdom of Serbs, Croats and Slovenes
- Date of death: 29 September 2024 (aged 97)
- Position: Striker

Senior career*
Years	Team	Apps	(Gls)
1947	Napredak Kruševac		
1947–1959	Partizan	167	(97)

International career
1949–1950	Yugoslavia	6	(3)

Managerial career
- 1959–1963: Burma
- 1963–1964: Partizan
- 1965: Partizan
- 1969–1970: Sloboda Titovo Užice
- 1971–1972: Galenika Zemun (joint)
- 1976–1977: Budućnost Titograd
- 1977: Yugoslavia
- 1978: OFK Beograd
- 1979: Philadelphia Fury
- 1980: Vojvodina
- 1981: Borac Banja Luka
- 1981–1982: Teteks
- 1982–1983: Adana Demirspor
- 1984: Rad
- * Club domestic league appearances and goals

Marko Valok (Serbian Cyrillic: Марко Валок, pronounced [mâːrko vâːlok]; 5 March 1927 – 29 September 2024) was a Serbian professional footballer who represented Yugoslavia internationally.

== Club career ==
=== Napredak Kruševac ===
Valok was part of the Napredak Kruševac team right at the foundation of the club in 1946, and made history as the club's first ever goalscorer, by scoring the only goal in Napredak's first ever official match against Makedonija, a 1–1 draw.

=== Partizan ===
In 1947, Valok moved to Partizan where he had a successful career until his retirement, twelve years later. His first Yugoslav First League game he played in season 1947–48 when he won third place with Partizan. For Partizan, he played in the period until 1959 and during that time he played 470 games (165 championships) and scored 411 goals (90 championships). On Partizan's all-time top goalscorer list he is second behind Stjepan Bobek who scored (425 goals).

Valok won one Yugoslav championship title with Partizan in 1948–49 and three times Yugoslav Cup 1952, 1954 and 1956–57. In all three final matches in the cup, Valok scored goals. In the finals in 1952 and 1954, he scored two goals each, and in the finals in 1957, he scored one goal.

He holds the record for most goals in the Serbian "eternal derby", scoring thirteen times against rivals Red Star Belgrade.

== International career ==
Valok played two games for Yugoslavia B team and six games for the best selection. He scored a total of three goals against Israel (2–5) in Tel Aviv two goals in the qualifying match for 1950 FIFA World Cup and in a friendly match in Stockholm against Sweden (1–2) one goal.

He made his national team debut on 19 June 1949 against Norway (1–3) in Oslo. And he played the last game for the national team against Austria (2–7) in Vienna 8 October 1950. He usually played in the positions of center forward and right wing.

== Coaching career ==
As a sports instructor in JNA, Valok worked in Myanmar (1959–1963), where he was also a coach for the Myanmar national team for a while. In the period from 1963 to 1967, he worked in Partizan.

He worked as the coach of the Yugoslavia national team in the period from 1977 to 1979.

He coached Burma, Partizan, Budućnost Titograd, Philadelphia Fury, Vojvodina, Adana Demirspor, Borac Banja Luka, Teteks, Galenika Zemun and FK Rad. He also coached FK IM Rakovica.

== Death ==
Valok died on 29 September 2024, at the age of 97.
