= 1959–60 FK Partizan season =

Partizan
1959–60 season
- President: Martin Dasović
- Head coach: Illés Spitz
- Yugoslav First League: 3rd
- Yugoslav Cup: Runners-up
- Top goalscorer: League: All: Milan Galić

The 1959–60 season was the 14th season in FK Partizan's existence. This article shows player statistics and matches that the club played during the 1959–60 season.

== Players ==
=== Squad information ===
Note: Flags indicate national team as defined under FIFA eligibility rules; some limited exceptions apply. Players may hold more than one non-FIFA nationality.

No.	Pos.	Nation	Player
—	GK	YUG	Jovan Ćurčić
—	GK	YUG	Milutin Šoškić
—	GK	YUG	Slavko Stojanović
—	DF	YUG	Bruno Belin
—	DF	YUG	Aleksandar Jončić
—	DF	YUG	Fahrudin Jusufi
—	DF	YUG	Milorad Milutinović
—	DF	YUG	Lazar Radović
—	MF	YUG	Velimir Sombolac
—	MF	YUG	Velibor Vasović
—	MF	YUG	Tomislav Kaloperović

No.	Pos.	Nation	Player
—	MF	YUG	Branislav Mihajlović
—	MF	YUG	Zoran Miladinović
—	MF	YUG	Bora Milutinović
—	MF	YUG	Bozidar Pajević
—	MF	YUG	Milan Vukelić
—	FW	YUG	Srđan Čebinac
—	FW	YUG	Zvezdan Čebinac
—	FW	YUG	Milan Galić
—	FW	YUG	Pavle Kiš
—	FW	YUG	Vladica Kovačević

== Friendlies ==
26 August 1959 Friendly	Partizan (Socialist Federal Republic of Yugoslavia)	2–1	(Hungary) MTK Budapest	Belgrade
	Kaloperović (pen.); Galić			Stadium: JNA Stadium; Attendance: 40,000

17 September 1959 Friendly	Dinamo Zagreb (Socialist Federal Republic of Yugoslavia)	2–2	(Socialist Federal Republic of Yugoslavia) Partizan	Zagreb
			Galić; Kaloperović	Stadium: Stadion Maksimir; Attendance: 9,000; Referee: Mikulan

18 October 1959 Friendly	Partizan (Socialist Federal Republic of Yugoslavia)	1–4	(Socialist Federal Republic of Yugoslavia) Yugoslavia	Belgrade
	Blažić 72'			Stadium: JNA Stadium; Attendance: 10,000; Referee: Zečević

6 February 1960 Friendly	Hapoel Tel Aviv (Israel)	0–1	(Socialist Federal Republic of Yugoslavia) Partizan	Tel-Aviv, Israel
			Čebinac 67'

9 February 1960 Friendly	Israel	1–2	(Socialist Federal Republic of Yugoslavia) Partizan	Tel-Aviv, Israel
			Kaloperović 11'; Vukelić 56'

13 February 1960 Friendly	Hapoel Petah Tikva (Israel)	2–3	(Socialist Federal Republic of Yugoslavia) Partizan	Petah Tikva, Israel
			Vukelić 7'; Mihajlović 17'; Kovačević 50'

15 February 1960 Friendly	Hapoel Haifa (Israel)	2–5	(Socialist Federal Republic of Yugoslavia) Partizan	Haifa, Israel
			Vukelić 7'; Galić 46', 48', 90'; Kaloperović 77' (pen.)	Attendance: 10,000

21 February 1960 Friendly	Partizan (Socialist Federal Republic of Yugoslavia)	2–1	(Poland) Legia Warsaw	Belgrade
	Mihajlović 63'; Mitić 75' (pen.)			Stadium: JNA Stadium; Attendance: 15,000; Referee: Života Bajić

8 June 1960 Friendly	Juventus (Italy)	1–1	(Socialist Federal Republic of Yugoslavia) Partizan	Turin, Italy
			Galić 26'	Stadium: Stadio Comunale; Attendance: 20,000

== Competitions ==
=== Yugoslav First League ===
Pos	Team	Pld	W	D	L	GF	GA	GD	Pts	Qualification or relegation
1	Red Star Belgrade (C)	22	15	3	4	47	25	+22	33	Qualification for European Cup preliminary round
2	Dinamo Zagreb	22	14	4	4	48	20	+28	32	Qualification for Cup Winners' Cup first round
3	Partizan	22	11	5	6	49	29	+20	27	
4	Vojvodina	22	10	7	5	36	22	+14	27	
5	Hajduk Split	22	10	6	6	47	26	+21	26	

Source: rsssf.org
Rules for classification: 1) points; 2) goal difference; 3) number of goals scored.
(C) Champions

30 August 1959 1	Hajduk Split	1–1	Partizan	Split
			Mihajlović 21'	Stadium: Stadion Stari plac Attendance: 15,000; Referee: Ivanovski (Skopje)

6 September 1959 2	Budućnost	2–4	Partizan	Titograd
			Kaloperović 2'; Mihajlović 17'; Z. Čebinac 23'; Miladinović 27'	Stadium: Podgorica City Stadium; Attendance: 6,000; Referee: Kranjc (Zagreb)

12 September 1959 3	Partizan	3–3	Velež	Belgrade
	Kaloperović 61', 84' (pen.), 86'			Stadium: JNA Stadium; Attendance: 20,000; Referee: Erlich (Ljubljana)

20 September 1959 4	Rijeka	1–6	Partizan	Rijeka
			Mihajlović 8', 13'; Kovačević 15', 56'; Galić 37'; Vasović 90'	Stadium: Stadion Kantrida; Attendance: 12,000; Referee: Stanišić (Sarajevo)

27 September 1959 5	Partizan	0–3	Crvena zvezda	Belgrade
				Stadium: JNA Stadium; Attendance: 50,000

4 October 1959 6	Sarajevo	1–2	Partizan	Sarajevo
			Mihajlović 58'; Galić 85'	Stadium: City Stadium Koševo; Attendance: 20,000; Referee: Varaždinec (Zagreb)

1 November 1959 7	Partizan	1–2	Radnički Beograd	Belgrade
	Miladinović 32'			Stadium: JNA Stadium; Attendance: 10,000; Referee: Kranjc (Zagreb)

8 November 1959 8	Sloboda Tuzla	0–2	Partizan	Tuzla
			Kaloperović 57'; Galić 59'	Stadium: Tušanj City Stadium; Attendance: 5,000; Referee: Tešanić (Varaždin)

22 November 1959 9	Partizan	2–1	Dinamo Zagreb	Belgrade
	Vukelić 26'; Jusufi 69'			Stadium: JNA Stadium; Attendance: 25,000; Referee: Ivanovski (Skopje)

30 November 1959 10	OFK Beograd	0–5	Partizan	Belgrade
			S. Čebinac 11', 14'; Z. Čebinac 63'; Kovačević 65'; Mitić 89'	Stadium: JNA Stadium; Attendance: 15,000; Referee: Zečević (Beograd)

6 December 1959 11	Partizan	0–1	Vojvodina	Belgrade
				Stadium: JNA Stadium; Attendance: 25,000; Referee: Nedelkovski (Skopje)

12 March 1960 12	Partizan	2–1	Hajduk Split	Belgrade
	Radović 35'; Galić 73'			Stadium: JNA Stadium; Attendance: 25,000; Referee: Stanković (Niš)

19 March 1960 13	Partizan	0–0	Budućnost	Belgrade
				Stadium: JNA Stadium; Attendance: 12,000; Referee: Gvardijančič (Ljubljana)

27 March 1960 14	Velež	1–0	Partizan	Mostar
				Attendance: 8,000

3 April 1960 15	Partizan	2–0	Rijeka	Belgrade
	Mihajlović 31'; S. Čebinac 79'			Stadium: JNA Stadium; Attendance: 15,000; Referee: Telebak (Sarajevo)

17 April 1960 16	Crvena zvezda	1–1	Partizan	Belgrade
	Toplak 56'		Kovačević 52'	Stadium: JNA Stadium; Attendance: 50,000

30 April 1960 17	Partizan	4–1	Sarajevo	Belgrade
	Galić 18'; Kovačević 22', 62'; Mihajlović 86'			Stadium: JNA Stadium; Attendance: 15,000; Referee: Kranjc (Zagreb)

15 May 1960 18	Radnički Beograd	0–4	Partizan	Belgrade
			Galić 27', 61' (pen.); Kovačević 48' (pen.); Z. Čebinac 64'	Attendance: 15,000; Referee: Petrošić (Split)

29 May 1960 19	Partizan	3–1	Sloboda Tuzla	Belgrade
	Vukelić 11'; Radović 45'; Galić 61'			Stadium: JNA Stadium; Attendance: 3,000

5 June 1960 20	Dinamo Zagreb	4–3	Partizan	Zagreb
			Galić 8', 16'; Radović 89'	Stadium: Stadion Maksimir; Attendance: 40,000

11 June 1960 21	Partizan	2–3	OFK Beograd	Belgrade
	Radović 20', 31'			Stadium: JNA Stadium; Attendance: 20,000

19 June 1960 22	Vojvodina	2–2	Partizan	Novi Sad
			Mitić 22'; Mihajlović 64'	Stadium: Karađorđe Stadium; Attendance: 16,000; Referee: Stanković (Niš)

=== Yugoslav Cup ===
2 December 1959 First round	Crvena zvezda	2–2 (5–6 p)	Partizan	Belgrade
			Kaloperović 53'; Kovačević 115'	Stadium: JNA Stadium; Attendance: 35,000

13 December 1959 Second round	Spartak Subotica	3–4 (a.e.t.)	Partizan	Subotica
			Galić 57', 64', 102'; Mitić 96'	Stadium: Subotica City Stadium; Attendance: 10,000; Referee: Stanišić

28 December 1959 Quarter-finals	Partizan	2–1	Željezničar	Belgrade
	Čebinac; Galić			Stadium: JNA Stadium; Attendance: 18,000

6 March 1960 Semi-finals	Velež	2–3	Partizan	Mostar
			Kovačević 5'; Galić 41', 86'	Stadium: Stadion pod Bijelim Brijegom; Attendance: 13,000; Referee: Tešanić

26 May 1960 Final	Dinamo Zagreb	3–2	Partizan	Belgrade
	Jerković 14', 53'; Lipošinović 49'		Kaloperović 8'; Kovačević 73'	Stadium: JNA Stadium; Attendance: 40,000; Referee: F. Taslidžić (Osijek)

=== Mitropa Cup ===
3 July 1960	Partizan (Socialist Federal Republic of Yugoslavia)	2–1	(Czechoslovakia) Slovan Bratislava	Belgrade, Yugoslavia
	Vukelić 15'; Vasović 72'			Stadium: JNA Stadium; Attendance: 15,000; Referee: Steiner (Austria)

10 July 1960	Slovan Bratislava (Czechoslovakia)	4–1 (5 – 3 agg.)	(Socialist Federal Republic of Yugoslavia) Partizan	Bratislava, Czechoslovakia
			Kovačević 75'	Attendance: 25,000; Referee: Hernadi (Hungary)

== Statistics ==
=== Goalscorers ===
This includes all competitive matches.

Rank	Pos	Nat	Name	Yugoslav First League	Yugoslav Cup	Total
1	FW	(Socialist Federal Republic of Yugoslavia)	Milan Galić	10	6	16
2	MF	(Socialist Federal Republic of Yugoslavia)	Vladica Kovačević	7	3	10
3	FW	(Socialist Federal Republic of Yugoslavia)	Branislav Mihajlović	8	0	8
4	MF	(Socialist Federal Republic of Yugoslavia)	Tomislav Kaloperović	5	2	7
5	MF	(Socialist Federal Republic of Yugoslavia)	Lazar Radović	5	0	5
6	MF	(Socialist Federal Republic of Yugoslavia)	Srđan Čebinac	3	1	4
7	MF	(Socialist Federal Republic of Yugoslavia)	Zvezdan Čebinac	3	0	3
7	MF	(Socialist Federal Republic of Yugoslavia)	Ilija Mitić	2	1	3
9	MF	(Socialist Federal Republic of Yugoslavia)	Milan Vukelić	2	0	2
9	MF	(Socialist Federal Republic of Yugoslavia)	Jovan Miladinović	2	0	2
11	DF	(Socialist Federal Republic of Yugoslavia)	Velibor Vasović	1	0	1
11	DF	(Socialist Federal Republic of Yugoslavia)	Fahrudin Jusufi	1	0	1
TOTALS				49	13	62

=== Score overview ===
Win Draw Loss

Opposition	Home score	Away score	Aggregate
Crvena zvezda	0–3	1–1	1–4
Dinamo Zagreb	2–1	3–4	5–5
Vojvodina	0–1	2–2	2–3
Hajduk Split	2–1	1–1	3–2
Sarajevo	4–1	2–1	6–2
OFK Beograd	2–3	5–0	7–3
Rijeka	2–0	6–1	8–1
Radnički Beograd	1–2	4–0	5–2
Velež	3–3	0–1	3–4
Budućnost	0–0	4–2	4–2
Sloboda Tuzla	3–1	2–0	5–1

== See also ==
- List of FK Partizan seasons
