= 1960–61 FK Partizan season =

Partizan
1960–61 season
- President: Martin Dasović
- Head coach: Stjepan Bobek
- Yugoslav First League: Winners
- Yugoslav Cup: Round of 16
- Top goalscorer: League: All: Milan Galić

The 1960–61 season was the 15th season in FK Partizan's existence. This article shows player statistics and matches that the club played during the 1960–61 season.

== Players ==
=== Squad information ===
player (league matches/league goals)
Tomislav Kaloperović (22/7)
Milutin Šoškić (22/0) (goalkeeper)
Velibor Vasović (22/1)
Fahrudin Jusufi (22/0)
Milan Galić (21/14)
Milan Vukelić (20/8)
Joakim Vislavski (20/5)
Vladica Kovačević (18/4)
Lazar Radović (17/3)
Jovan Miladinović (16/2)
Branislav Mihajlović (12/5)
Aleksandar Jončić (11/0)
Velimir Sombolac (9/0)
Bora Milutinović (6/2)
Bruno Belin (5/0)
Ilija Mitić (5/0)
Božidar Pajević (5/0)
Milorad Milutinović (2/0)
Miodrag Petrović (1/0)
Dragomir Slišković (1/0)

== Friendlies ==
| 21 December 1960 Friendly | PAOK (Greece) | 0–2 | (Socialist Federal Republic of Yugoslavia) Partizan | Thessaloniki, Greece |
| | | | Radović 4'; Kaloperović 55' | Attendance: 15,000 |

| 25 December 1960 Friendly | AEK Athens (Greece) | 1–3 | (Socialist Federal Republic of Yugoslavia) Partizan | Athens, Greece |
| | | | Vukelić 30'; Milutinović 53'; Galić 85' | Attendance: 12,000 |

| 26 December 1960 Friendly | Olympiacos (Greece) | 2–3 | (Socialist Federal Republic of Yugoslavia) Partizan | Athens, Greece |
| | | | Kovačević; Jusufi; Kaloperović | Attendance: 20,000 |

| 28 December 1960 Friendly | Panathinaikos (Greece) | 0–2 | (Socialist Federal Republic of Yugoslavia) Partizan | Athens, Greece |
| | | | Radović 35'; Kovačević 58' |

| 26 February 1961 Friendly | Partizan (Socialist Federal Republic of Yugoslavia) | 2–0 | (Poland) Legia Warsaw | Belgrade |
| | Petrović; Vasović |

| 28 June 1961 Friendly | Partizan (Socialist Federal Republic of Yugoslavia) | 0–0 | (Hungary) Vasas | Belgrade |

== Competitions ==
=== Yugoslav First League ===
| Pos | Team | Pld | W | D | L | GF | GA | GD | Pts | Qualification or relegation |
|---|---|---|---|---|---|---|---|---|---|---|
| 1 | Partizan (C) | 22 | 15 | 2 | 5 | 53 | 23 | +30 | 32 | Qualification for European Cup preliminary round |
| 2 | Red Star Belgrade | 22 | 13 | 5 | 4 | 38 | 21 | +17 | 31 | Invitation for Inter-Cities Fairs Cup first round |
| 3 | Hajduk Split | 22 | 13 | 4 | 5 | 34 | 22 | +12 | 30 | |
| 4 | Dinamo Zagreb | 22 | 10 | 7 | 5 | 36 | 27 | +9 | 27 | Invitation for Inter-Cities Fairs Cup first round |
| 5 | Vojvodina | 22 | 10 | 3 | 9 | 32 | 29 | +3 | 23 | Invitation for Inter-Cities Fairs Cup first round |

Source: rsssf.org
Rules for classification: 1) points; 2) goal difference; 3) number of goals scored.
(C) Champions

| 18 September 1960 1 | Split | 2–4 | Partizan | Split |
| | | | Galić 5', 35'; Kaloperović 38'; Mihajlović 71' | Stadium: Stadion Stari plac Attendance: 12,000; Referee: Erlih (Ljubljana) |

| 25 September 1960 2 | Partizan | 1–1 | Dinamo Zagreb | Belgrade |
| | Kaloperović 49' | | Lipošinović 88' | Stadium: JNA Stadium; Attendance: 45,000; Referee: Emil Erlich |

| 2 October 1960 3 | Rijeka | 2–1 | Partizan | Rijeka |
| | | | Mihajlović 20' | Stadium: Stadion Kantrida; Attendance: 12,000 |

| 15 October 1960 4 | Partizan | 2–0 | OFK Beograd | Belgrade |
| | Kaloperović 23' (pen.); Mihajlović 28' | | | Stadium: JNA Stadium; Attendance: 20,000 |

| 23 October 1960 5 | Velež | 2–5 | Partizan | Mostar |
| | | | Mihajlović 36'; Vukelić 52'; Vislavski 68'; Galić 70'; Kovačević 85' | Stadium: Stadion pod Bijelim Brijegom; Attendance: 12,000; Referee: Varaždinec (Zagreb) |

| 30 October 1960 6 | Partizan | 3–0 | Crvena zvezda | Belgrade |
| | Galić 8', 48'; Vukelić 49' | | | Stadium: JNA Stadium; Attendance: 52,700 |

| 6 November 1960 7 | Hajduk Split | 0–0 | Partizan | Split |
| | | | | Stadium: Stadion Stari plac Attendance: 16,000 |

| 13 November 1960 8 | Partizan | 2–0 | Vardar | Belgrade |
| | Galić 53'; Radović 82' | | | Stadium: JNA Stadium; Attendance: 30,000 |

| 20 November 1960 9 | Vojvodina | 0–1 | Partizan | Novi Sad |
| | | | Radović 9' | Stadium: Stadion Karađorđe; Attendance: 20,000 |

| 27 November 1960 10 | Sarajevo | 2–0 | Partizan | Sarajevo |
| | | | | Attendance: 20,000 |

| 3 December 1960 11 | Partizan | 3–2 | Radnički Beograd | Belgrade |
| | Golubović 23' (o.g.); Vukelić 36'; Kovačević 47' | | | Stadium: JNA Stadium; Attendance: 12,000; Referee: Petrošić (Split) |

| 12 March 1961 12 | Partizan | 5–0 | Split | Belgrade |
| | Miladinović 17'; Kaloperović 21' (pen.); B. Milutinović 62', 80'; Galić 86' | | | Stadium: JNA Stadium; Attendance: 15,000 |

| 19 March 1961 13 | Dinamo Zagreb | 0–1 | Partizan | Zagreb |
| | | | Miladinović 62' | Stadium: Stadion Maksimir; Attendance: 20,000; Referee: Erlich (Ljubljana) |

| 26 March 1961 14 | Partizan | 1–0 | Rijeka | Belgrade |
| | Vukelić 89' | | | Stadium: JNA Stadium; Attendance: 25,000; Referee: Ivanovski (Skopje) |

| 2 April 1961 15 | OFK Beograd | 2–1 | Partizan | Belgrade |
| | | | Vasović 53' | Stadium: Omladinski Stadium; Attendance: 20,000; Referee: Erlich (Ljubljana) |

| 9 April 1961 16 | Partizan | 3–0 | Velež | Belgrade |
| | Vislavski 10', 20', 78' | | | Stadium: JNA Stadium; Attendance: 20,000; Referee: Ilić (Zagreb) |

| 16 April 1961 17 | Crvena zvezda | 3–2 | Partizan | Belgrade |
| | Rudinski 33' (pen.) 78'; Kostić 38' | | Kovačević 70'; Galić 83' (pen.) | Stadium: JNA Stadium; Attendance: 50,000 |

| 22 April 1961 18 | Partizan | 4–0 | Hajduk Split | Belgrade |
| | Kaloperović 22' (pen.); Mihajlović 47'; Vukelić 75'; Ilić 78' (o.g.) | | | Stadium: JNA Stadium; Attendance: 32,000 |

| 30 April 1961 19 | Vardar | 3–1 | Partizan | Skopje |
| | | | Kovačević 69' (pen.) | Attendance: 25,000 |

| 14 May 1961 20 | Partizan | 4–0 | Vojvodina | Belgrade |
| | Radović 13'; Kaloperović 22' (pen.); Vukelić 76'; Galić 88' | | | Stadium: JNA Stadium; Attendance: 30,000; Referee: Tešanić (Varaždin) |

| 21 May 1961 21 | Partizan | 5–2 | Sarajevo | Belgrade |
| | Galić 19', 47'; Kaloperović 37'; Mihajlović 41'; Vukelić 82' | | | Stadium: JNA Stadium; Attendance: 8,000 |

| 11 June 1961 22 | Radnički Beograd | 2–4 | Partizan | Belgrade |
| | | | Vukelić 1'; Galić 10', 46', 78' | Stadium: JNA Stadium; Attendance: 15,000 |

=== Yugoslav Cup ===
| 10 December 1960 First round | Partizan | 3–1 | Budućnost | Belgrade |
| | Radović 19'; Miladinović 28'; Jovanović 74' (o.g.) | | | Stadium: JNA Stadium; Attendance: 8,000 |

| 18 December 1960 Second round | Vardar | 3–2 | Partizan | Skopje |
| | | | Galić 7', 54' | Attendance: 10,000 |

== Statistics ==
=== Goalscorers ===
This includes all competitive matches.

| Rank | Pos | Nat | Name | Yugoslav First League | Yugoslav Cup | Total |
|---|---|---|---|---|---|---|
| 1 | FW | (Socialist Federal Republic of Yugoslavia) | Milan Galić | 14 | 2 | 16 |
| 2 | MF | (Socialist Federal Republic of Yugoslavia) | Milan Vukelić | 8 | 0 | 8 |
| 3 | MF | (Socialist Federal Republic of Yugoslavia) | Tomislav Kaloperović | 7 | 0 | 7 |
| 4 | FW | (Socialist Federal Republic of Yugoslavia) | Branislav Mihajlović | 6 | 0 | 6 |
| 5 | FW | (Socialist Federal Republic of Yugoslavia) | Joakim Vislavski | 4 | 0 | 4 |
| 5 | MF | (Socialist Federal Republic of Yugoslavia) | Vladica Kovačević | 4 | 0 | 4 |
| 5 | MF | (Socialist Federal Republic of Yugoslavia) | Lazar Radović | 3 | 1 | 4 |
| 8 | MF | (Socialist Federal Republic of Yugoslavia) | Jovan Miladinović | 2 | 1 | 3 |
| 8 | own goals | | | 2 | 1 | 3 |
| 10 | MF | (Socialist Federal Republic of Yugoslavia) | Bora Milutinović | 2 | 0 | 2 |
| 11 | DF | (Socialist Federal Republic of Yugoslavia) | Velibor Vasović | 1 | 0 | 1 |
| TOTALS | | | | 53 | 5 | 58 |

=== Score overview ===
Win Draw Loss

| Opposition | Home score | Away score | Aggregate |
|---|---|---|---|
| Crvena zvezda | 3–0 | 2–3 | 5–3 |
| Hajduk Split | 4–0 | 0–0 | 4–0 |
| Dinamo Zagreb | 1–1 | 1–0 | 2–1 |
| Vojvodina | 4–0 | 1–0 | 5–0 |
| OFK Beograd | 2–0 | 1–2 | 3–2 |
| Rijeka | 1–0 | 1–2 | 2–2 |
| Sarajevo | 5–2 | 0–2 | 5–4 |
| Velež | 3–0 | 5–2 | 8–2 |
| Vardar | 2–0 | 1–3 | 3–3 |
| Split | 5–0 | 4–2 | 9–2 |
| Radnički Beograd | 3–2 | 4–2 | 7–4 |

== See also ==
- List of FK Partizan seasons
