= 1962–63 FK Partizan season =

Partizan
1962–63 season
- President: Dimitrije Pisković
- Head coach: Stjepan Bobek
- Yugoslav First League: Winners
- Yugoslav Cup: First round
- European Cup: Preliminary round
- Top goalscorer: League: All: Milan Galić

The 1962–63 season was the 17th season in FK Partizan's existence. This article shows player statistics and matches that the club played during the 1962–63 season.

== Players ==
=== Squad information ===
Player (league matches/league goals)
Vladica Kovačević (26/14)
Milutin Šoškić (26/0) (goalkeeper)
Milan Galić (25/16)
Fahrudin Jusufi (25/0)
Velibor Vasović (24/2)
Ljubomir Mihajlović (23/0)
Milan Vukelić (18/2)
Joakim Vislavski (16/7)
Zvezdan Čebinac (16/0)
Bora Milutinović (15/1)
Velimir Sombolac (14/0)
Mustafa Hasanagić (12/4)
Anton Rudinski (8/6)
Aleksandar Jončić (8/0)
Ivan Rajić (6/1)
Lazar Radović (5/2)
Milorad Milutinović (5/0)
Ilija Mitić (5/0)
Dragomir Slišković (5/0)
Branislav Mihajlović (4/1)
Mane Bajić (4/0)
Miodrag Petrović (3/1)
Vladimir Petrović (3/0)
Dragoslav Jovanović (2/0)
Milan Damjanović (1/0)
Zenun Brovina
Dimitrije Davidović
Poljan
Jankulovski
Milanović

== Friendlies ==
3 August 1962 Friendly	Bayern Munich (West Germany)	5–3	(Socialist Federal Republic of Yugoslavia) Partizan	Munich, West Germany
			Kovačević 12'; Vukelić 40' ? ?'

6 August 1962 Friendly	AS Cannes (France)	2–3	(Socialist Federal Republic of Yugoslavia) Partizan	Cannes, France
			Mihajlović 36'; Hasanagić 54', 58'

12 August 1962 Friendly	Reims (France)	2–2	(Socialist Federal Republic of Yugoslavia) Partizan	Vittel, France

17 December 1962 Friendly	Zadar (Socialist Federal Republic of Yugoslavia)	0–7	(Socialist Federal Republic of Yugoslavia) Partizan	Zadar
			Hasanagić; Rudinski; Milutinović; Vislavski	Attendance: 5,000

26 December 1962 Friendly	AEK Athens (Greece)	2–1	(Socialist Federal Republic of Yugoslavia) Partizan	Athens, Greece
			Rudinski	Attendance: 15,000

28 December 1962 Friendly	Olympiacos (Greece)	1–1	(Socialist Federal Republic of Yugoslavia) Partizan	Athens, Greece
			Hasanagić	Attendance: 20,000

30 December 1962 Friendly	Panathinaikos (Greece)	1–4	(Socialist Federal Republic of Yugoslavia) Partizan	Athens, Greece
			Bečejac; Milutinović; Kovačević	Attendance: 20,000

4 January 1963 Friendly	Zamalek (United Arab Republic)	2–2	(Socialist Federal Republic of Yugoslavia) Partizan	Cairo, United Arab Republic

8 January 1963 Friendly	United Arab Republic	1–2	(Socialist Federal Republic of Yugoslavia) Partizan	Cairo, United Arab Republic
			Hasanagić	Attendance: 25,000

10 February 1963 Friendly	Mačva Šabac (Socialist Federal Republic of Yugoslavia)	0–2	(Socialist Federal Republic of Yugoslavia) Partizan	Šabac
			Kovačević 37', 88'	Attendance: 400

21 February 1963 Friendly	Partizan (Socialist Federal Republic of Yugoslavia)	4–1	(Romania) Petrolul Ploiești	Belgrade
	Kovačević 25', 49'; Galić 65', 78'			Stadium: JNA Stadium; Attendance: 10,000; Referee: Živko Bajić (Beograd)

25 May 1963 Friendly	Partizan (Socialist Federal Republic of Yugoslavia)	1–1	(Brazil) Santos	Strasbourg, France
	Hasanagić 58'		44' Coutinho	Attendance: 30,000

== Competitions ==
=== Yugoslav First League ===
Pos	Team	Pld	W	D	L	GF	GA	GD	Pts	Qualification or relegation
1	Partizan (C)	26	16	8	2	58	22	+36	40	Qualification for European Cup preliminary round
2	Dinamo Zagreb	26	14	7	5	52	35	+17	35	Qualification for Cup Winners' Cup first round
3	Željezničar	26	11	7	8	49	31	+18	29	
4	Velež	26	10	8	8	33	31	+2	28	
5	OFK Belgrade	26	10	8	8	42	40	+2	28	Invitation for Inter-Cities Fairs Cup first round

Source: rsssf.org
Rules for classification: 1) points; 2) goal difference; 3) number of goals scored.
(C) Champions

19 August 1962 1	Dinamo Zagreb	3–3	Partizan	Zagreb
			Kovačević 6'; B. Mihajlović 52'; Radović 62'	Stadium: Stadion Maksimir; Attendance: 40,000; Referee: Telebak (Sarajevo)

26 August 1962 2	Sloboda Tuzla	0–2	Partizan	Tuzla
			Galić 57'; Kovačević 73'	Stadium: Stadion Tušanj; Attendance: 13,000

2 September 1962 3	Partizan	4–1	Velež	Belgrade
	Galić 60'; Vislavski 62'; Vukelić 79', 90'			Stadium: Omladinski Stadium; Attendance: 25,000; Referee: Rukavina (Varaždin)

9 September 1962 4	Željezničar	2–1	Partizan	Sarajevo
			Vislavski 5'	Attendance: 25,000; Referee: Kapusta (Zagreb)

23 September 1962 5	Partizan	4–3	Vojvodina	Belgrade
	Galić 12', 44', 78'; Radović 84'			Stadium: JNA Stadium; Attendance: 15,000

7 October 1962 6	Rijeka	0–2	Partizan	Rijeka
			Vislavski 28', 75'	Stadium: Stadion Kantrida; Attendance: 12,000; Referee: Telebak (Sarajevo)

21 October 1962 7	Partizan	3–0	Budućnost	Belgrade
	Galić 52' (pen.); Hasanagić 54', 59'			Stadium: JNA Stadium; Attendance: 15,000; Referee: Ilić

28 October 1962 8	Crvena zvezda	0–5	Partizan	Belgrade
			Galić 21', 35', 47'; Vislavski 62', 72'	Stadium: JNA Stadium; Attendance: 50,000

11 November 1962 9	Partizan	2–1	OFK Beograd	Belgrade
	Milutinović 14'; Kovačević 63'			Stadium: JNA Stadium; Attendance: 12,000; Referee: Strmečki (Zagreb)

18 November 1962 10	Sarajevo	1–1	Partizan	Sarajevo
			Petrović 50'	Stadium: Koševo Stadium; Attendance: 18,000; Referee: Tumbas (Subotica)

25 November 1962 11	Partizan	5–1	Novi Sad	Belgrade
	Kovačević 28'; Vislavski 53'; Galić 64', 67', 85'			Stadium: JNA Stadium; Attendance: 8,000; Referee: Varaždinac (Zagreb)

2 December 1962 12	Radnički Niš	0–1	Partizan	Niš
			Galić 47'	Stadium: Čair Stadium; Attendance: 20,000; Referee: Telebak (Sarajevo)

9 December 1962 13	Partizan	4–1	Hajduk Split	Belgrade
	Galić 22'; Kovačević 36', 45', 70'			Stadium: JNA Stadium; Attendance: 12,000; Referee: Jakše (Ljubljana)

3 March 1963 14	Partizan	1–1	Dinamo Zagreb	Belgrade
	Galić 18'			Stadium: JNA Stadium; Attendance: 45,000; Referee: Jakše (Ljubljana)

10 March 1963 15	Partizan	4–0	Sloboda Tuzla	Belgrade
	Rudinski 2', 26', 85'; Kovačević 46'			Stadium: JNA Stadium; Attendance: 40,000; Referee: J. Ilić (Zagreb)

17 March 1963 16	Velež	0–1	Partizan	Mostar
			Vasović 59'	Attendance: 11,000; Referee: Rukavina (Varaždin)

24 March 1963 17	Partizan	1–1	Željezničar	Belgrade
	Kovačević 83' (pen.)			Stadium: JNA Stadium; Attendance: 15,000; Referee: Jakše (Ljubljana)

7 April 1963 18	Vojvodina	1–1	Partizan	Novi Sad
			Hasanagić 6'	Stadium: Stadion Karađorđe; Attendance: 25,000; Referee: Rukavina (Varaždin)

14 April 1963 19	Partizan	2–0	Rijeka	Belgrade
	Kovačević 36', 45'			Stadium: JNA Stadium; Attendance: 15,000; Referee: Šestić (Mostar)

21 April 1963 20	Budućnost	0–2	Partizan	Titograd
			Rajić 29'; Kovačević 70'	Stadium: Stadion Pod Goricom; Attendance: 15,000; Referee: Varaždinac (Zagreb)

28 April 1963 21	Partizan	1–2	Crvena zvezda	Belgrade
	Vasović 65'		Kostić 30', 76'	Stadium: JNA Stadium; Attendance: 50,000; Referee: Tešanić

5 May 1963 22	OFK Beograd	1–3	Partizan	Belgrade
			Hasanagić 10', 51'; Kovačević 70'	Stadium: JNA Stadium; Attendance: 15,000; Referee: Škorić (Beograd)

12 May 1963 23	Partizan	2–0	Sarajevo	Belgrade
	Rudinski 43', 83'			Stadium: JNA Stadium; Attendance: 6,000; Referee: Tauzes (Ljubljana)

19 May 1963 24	Novi Sad	2–2	Partizan	Novi Sad
			Kovačević 47' (pen.); Rudinski 84'	Stadium: Stadion Karađorđe; Attendance: 20,000

2 June 1963 25	Partizan	0–0	Radnički Niš	Belgrade
				Stadium: JNA Stadium; Attendance: 25,000; Referee: Tauzes (Ljubljana)

9 June 1963 26	Hajduk Split	1–1	Partizan	Split
			Galić 73'	Stadium: Stadion Stari plac Attendance: 15,000

=== Yugoslav Cup ===
16 December 1962 First round	Hajduk Split	3–1	Partizan	Split
			Galić 50'	Attendance: 10,000

=== European Cup ===
==== Preliminary round ====
19 September 1962 Preliminary round 1st leg	CSKA Red Flag (Bulgaria)	2–1	(Socialist Federal Republic of Yugoslavia) Partizan	Sofia, Bulgaria
	Rankov 14'; Kolev 19'	Report	Kovačević 35' (pen.)	Stadium: Vasil Levski National Stadium; Attendance: 21,421; Referee: Alfred Haberfellner (Austria)

3 October 1962 Preliminary round 2nd leg	Partizan (Socialist Federal Republic of Yugoslavia)	1–4 (2 – 6 agg.)	(Bulgaria) CSKA Red Flag	Belgrade, Yugoslavia
	Galić 70'	Report	Tsanev 23'; Yakimov 48'; Kovachev 80' (pen.); Panayotov 90'	Stadium: JNA Stadium; Attendance: 26,890; Referee: Fritz Seipelt (Austria)

== Statistics ==
=== Goalscorers ===
This includes all competitive matches.

Rank	Pos	Nat	Name	Yugoslav First League	Yugoslav Cup	European Cup	Total
1	FW	(Socialist Federal Republic of Yugoslavia)	Milan Galić	16	1	1	18
2	MF	(Socialist Federal Republic of Yugoslavia)	Vladica Kovačević	15	0	1	16
3	FW	(Socialist Federal Republic of Yugoslavia)	Joakim Vislavski	6	0	0	6
4	FW	(Socialist Federal Republic of Yugoslavia)	Mustafa Hasanagić	5	0	0	5
4	FW	(Socialist Federal Republic of Yugoslavia)	Antun Rudinski	5	0	0	5
6	MF	(Socialist Federal Republic of Yugoslavia)	Lazar Radović	2	0	0	2
6	MF	(Socialist Federal Republic of Yugoslavia)	Milan Vukelić	2	0	0	2
6	DF	(Socialist Federal Republic of Yugoslavia)	Velibor Vasović	2	0	0	2
9	MF	(Socialist Federal Republic of Yugoslavia)	Ivan Rajić	1	0	0	1
9	FW	(Socialist Federal Republic of Yugoslavia)	Miodrag Petrović	1	0	0	1
9	FW	(Socialist Federal Republic of Yugoslavia)	Branislav Mihajlović	1	0	0	1
9	MF	(Socialist Federal Republic of Yugoslavia)	Bora Milutinović	1	0	0	1
9	own goals			1	0	0	1
TOTALS				58	1	2	61

=== Score overview ===
Win Draw Loss

Opposition	Home score	Away score	Aggregate
Dinamo Zagreb	1–1	3–3	4–4
Željezničar	1–1	1–2	2–3
Velež	4–1	1–0	5–1
OFK Beograd	2–1	3–1	5–2
Radnički Niš	0–0	1–0	1–0
Crvena zvezda	1–2	5–0	6–2
Novi Sad	5–1	2–2	7–3
Sarajevo	2–0	1–1	3–1
Rijeka	2–0	2–0	4–0
Hajduk Split	4–1	1–1	5–2
Vojvodina	4–3	1–1	5–4
Novi Sad	4–0	2–0	6–0
Budućnost	3–0	2–0	5–0

== See also ==
- List of FK Partizan seasons
