= 1961–62 FK Partizan season =

Partizan
1961–62 season
- President: Martin Dasović
- Head coach: Stjepan Bobek
- Yugoslav First League: Winners
- Yugoslav Cup: First round
- European Cup: First round
- Top goalscorer: League: All: Vladica Kovačević

The 1961–62 season was the 16th season in FK Partizan's existence. This article shows player statistics and matches that the club played during the 1961–62 season.

== Players ==
=== Squad information ===
player (league matches/league goals)
Velibor Vasović (22/2)
Milutin Šoškić (22/0) (goalkeeper)
Milan Galić (21/7)
Fahrudin Jusufi (21/0)
Vladica Kovačević (19/15)
Milan Vukelić (17/6)
Joakim Vislavski (17/3)
Velimir Sombolac (17/0)
Lazar Radović (16/2)
Branislav Mihajlović (16/0)
Zvezdan Čebinac (14/3)
Milorad Milutinović (12/0)
Radivoj Ognjanović (9/1)
Dragoslav Jovanović (8/0)
Ljubomir Mihajlović (6/0)
Dragomir Slišković (4/1)
Ivan Rajić (3/1)
Miodrag Petrović (3/0)
Vladimir Petrović (3/0)
Bruno Belin (2/0)
Mustafa Hasanagić (1/0)

== Friendlies ==
19 August 1961 Friendly	Vasas (Hungary)	1–0	(Socialist Federal Republic of Yugoslavia) Partizan	Budapest, Hungary

30 August 1961 Friendly	Lazio (Italy)	2–0	(Socialist Federal Republic of Yugoslavia) Partizan	Rome, Italy

7 January 1962 Friendly	Bolívar (Bolivia)	2–0	(Socialist Federal Republic of Yugoslavia) Partizan	La Paz, Bolivia

10 January 1962 Friendly	Bolívar (Bolivia)	2–1	(Socialist Federal Republic of Yugoslavia) Partizan	La Paz, Bolivia

14 January 1962 Friendly	Always Ready (Bolivia)	0–2	(Socialist Federal Republic of Yugoslavia) Partizan	La Paz, Bolivia

20 January 1962 Friendly	Colo-Colo (Chile)	1–3	(Socialist Federal Republic of Yugoslavia) Partizan	Santiago, Chile

21 January 1962 Friendly	Antofagasta XI (Chile)	2–1	(Socialist Federal Republic of Yugoslavia) Partizan	Antofagasta, Chile

27 January 1962 Friendly	Cerro (Uruguay)	2–1	(Socialist Federal Republic of Yugoslavia) Partizan	Montevideo, Uruguay

== Competitions ==
=== Yugoslav First League ===
Pos	Team	Pld	W	D	L	GF	GA	GD	Pts	Qualification or relegation
1	Partizan (C)	22	13	5	4	42	22	+20	31	Qualification for European Cup preliminary round
2	Vojvodina	22	9	8	5	30	25	+5	26	Invitation for Inter-Cities Fairs Cup first round
3	Dinamo Zagreb	22	10	5	7	36	23	+13	25	Invitation for Inter-Cities Fairs Cup first round
4	Red Star Belgrade	22	9	6	7	35	25	+10	24	Invitation for Inter-Cities Fairs Cup first round
5	Hajduk Split	22	8	8	6	30	30	0	24	

Source: rsssf.org
Rules for classification: 1) points; 2) goal difference; 3) number of goals scored.
(C) Champions

22 August 1961 1	Partizan	2–0	Dinamo Zagreb	Belgrade
	Kovačević 51', 53'			Stadium: JNA Stadium; Attendance: 30,000; Referee: Ivanovski (Skopje)

27 August 1961 2	Partizan	2–1	OFK Beograd	Belgrade
	Galić 16', 60'			Stadium: JNA Stadium; Attendance: 35,000; Referee: Petrović (Beograd)

3 September 1961 3	Novi Sad	0–0	Partizan	Novi Sad
				Stadium: Karađorđe Stadium; Attendance: 15,000; Referee: Ilić

10 September 1961 4	Partizan	1–0	Rijeka	Belgrade
	Radović 23'			Stadium: JNA Stadium; Attendance: 25,000; Referee: Rukavina (Varaždin)

17 September 1961 5	Borac Banja Luka	4–7	Partizan	Banja Luka
			Vislavski 11', 45'; Vukelić 12', 20', 40'; Mihajlović 15'; Slišković 65'	Stadium: Banja Luka City Stadium; Attendance: 15,000; Referee: Tešanić (Varaždin)

23 September 1961 6	Partizan	1–3	Vardar	Belgrade
	Vasović 65'			Stadium: JNA Stadium; Attendance: 15,000; Referee: Telebak (Sarajevo)

1 October 1961 7	Crvena zvezda	0–0	Partizan	Belgrade
				Stadium: JNA Stadium; Attendance: 50,000; Referee: Tešanić

15 October 1961 8	Partizan	4–0	Hajduk Split	Belgrade
	Kovačević 4', 78', 89'; Vislavski 63'			Stadium: JNA Stadium; Attendance: 50,000; Referee: Ivanovski (Skopje)

22 October 1961 9	Vojvodina	0–1	Partizan	Novi Sad
			Galić 75'	Stadium: Karađorđe Stadium; Attendance: 20,000

28 October 1961 10	Partizan	3–1	Velež	Belgrade
	Rodin 36' (o.g.); Vukelić 41'; Radović 55'			Stadium: JNA Stadium; Attendance: 12,000; Referee: Cahun (Duga Resa)

5 November 1961 11	Sarajevo	3–3	Partizan	Sarajevo
			Kovačević 2', 39', 66'	Stadium: City Stadium Koševo; Attendance: 15,000; Referee: Tešanić (Varaždin)

12 November 1961 12	Dinamo Zagreb	0–0	Partizan	Zagreb
				Stadium: Stadion Maksimir; Attendance: 30,000; Referee: Cahun (Duga Resa)

4 March 1962 13	OFK Beograd	1–2	Partizan	Belgrade
			Galić 8', 60'	Stadium: Omladinski Stadium; Attendance: 25,000; Referee: Tešanić (Varaždin)

11 March 1962 14	Partizan	1–0	Novi Sad	Belgrade
	Čebinac 10'			Stadium: JNA Stadium; Attendance: 10,000; Referee: Gugić (Skopje)

18 March 1962 15	Rijeka	1–3	Partizan	Rijeka
			Galić 10'; Kovačević 69'; Čebinac 74'	Stadium: Stadion Kantrida; Attendance: 12,000; Referee: Cahun (Duga Resa)

24 March 1962 16	Partizan	5–0	Borac Banja Luka	Belgrade
	Rajić 47'; Čebinac 51'; Kovačević 64'; Vukelić 70'; Ognjanović 80'			Stadium: JNA Stadium; Attendance: 12,000; Referee: Kapusta (Zagreb)

11 April 1962 17	Vardar	0–1	Partizan	Skopje
			Kovačević 22'	Attendance: 25,000

18 April 1962 18	Partizan	1–1	Crvena zvezda	Belgrade
	Kovačević 83' (pen.)		Malešev 15'	Stadium: JNA Stadium; Attendance: 55,000; Referee: Ivanovski

15 April 1962 19	Hajduk Split	1–0	Partizan	Split
				Attendance: 18,000

22 April 1962 20	Partizan	2–3	Vojvodina	Belgrade
	Galić 22'; Vasović 68'			Stadium: JNA Stadium; Attendance: 20,000; Referee: Kapusta (Zagreb)

29 April 1962 21	Velež	2–1	Partizan	Mostar
			Kovačević 84'	Attendance: 8,000; Referee: Rukavina (Varaždin)

2 May 1962 22	Partizan	2–1	Sarajevo	Belgrade
	Kovačević 34' (pen.), 52'			Stadium: JNA Stadium; Attendance: 12,000; Referee: Gugić (Skopje)

=== Yugoslav Cup ===
11 February 1962 First round	Sloboda Tuzla	1–0	Partizan	Tuzla
				Attendance: 10,000

=== European Cup ===
==== Preliminary round ====
13 September 1961 Preliminary round 1st leg	Sporting CP (Portugal)	1–1	(Socialist Federal Republic of Yugoslavia) Partizan	Lisbon, Portugal
	Soares 87'	Report	Vukelić 68'	Stadium: Estádio José Alvalade; Attendance: 16,302; Referee: Josef Gulde (Switzerland)

20 September 1961 Preliminary round 2nd leg	Partizan (Socialist Federal Republic of Yugoslavia)	2–0 (3 – 1 agg.)	(Portugal) Sporting CP	Belgrade, Yugoslavia
	Radović 18'; Vislavski 87'	Report		Stadium: Partizan Stadium; Attendance: 19,755; Referee: Daniel Mellet (Switzerland)

==== First round ====
8 November 1961 First round 1st leg	Partizan (Socialist Federal Republic of Yugoslavia)	1–2	(Italy) Juventus	Belgrade, Yugoslavia
	Vasović 76'	Report	Nicolè 35'; Rosa 73'	Stadium: Partizan Stadium; Attendance: 23,472; Referee: Victor Schicker (Switzerland)

15 November 1961 First round 2nd leg	Juventus (Italy)	5–0 (7 – 1 agg.)	(Socialist Federal Republic of Yugoslavia) Partizan	Turin, Italy
	Nicolè 1'; Mora 36', 65'; Rosa 61'; Stacchini 67'	Report		Stadium: Stadio Comunale; Attendance: 14,347; Referee: Josef Gulde (Switzerland)

=== Mitropa Cup ===
Team	Pld	W	D	L	GF	GA	GD	Pts
(Italy) Atalanta	6	1	5	0	14	8	+6	7
(Hungary) MTK Budapest	6	2	1	1	3	5	+2	6
(Socialist Federal Republic of Yugoslavia) Partizan	6	1	4	1	11	13	−2	6
(Czechoslovakia) Baník Ostrava	6	1	3	2	10	16	−6	5

13 May 1962 1	Partizan (Socialist Federal Republic of Yugoslavia)	2–2	(Czechoslovakia) Baník Ostrava	Belgrade, Yugoslavia
	Vasović 25'; Mihajlović 66'			Attendance: 8,000

20 May 1962 2	Baník Ostrava (Czechoslovakia)	1–1	(Socialist Federal Republic of Yugoslavia) Partizan	Ostrava, Czechoslovakia
			Milutinović 27'	Attendance: 6,000

27 May 1962 3	Atalanta (Italy)	3–3	(Socialist Federal Republic of Yugoslavia) Partizan	Bergamo, Italy
			Mihajlović; Vislavski; Vasović	Attendance: 15,000

3 June 1962 4	Partizan (Socialist Federal Republic of Yugoslavia)	2–2	(Italy) Atalanta	Belgrade, Yugoslavia
	Vasović 1'; Vukelić 71'			Attendance: 18,000

10 June 1962 5	Partizan (Socialist Federal Republic of Yugoslavia)	2–1	(Hungary) MTK Budapest	Belgrade, Yugoslavia
	Milutinović 12'; Radović 37'		18' (o.g.)	Attendance: 15,000

17 June 1962 6	MTK Budapest (Hungary)	4–1	(Socialist Federal Republic of Yugoslavia) Partizan	Budapest, Hungary
	5'; 18'; 19'; 85'		Mihajlović 62'	Attendance: 15,000

== See also ==
- List of FK Partizan seasons
