= 1964–65 FK Partizan season =

Partizan
1964–65 season
- President: Ilija Radaković
- Head coach: Florijan Matekalo (until 1 August 1964); Aleksandar Atanacković (until December 1964); Marko Valok
- Yugoslav First League: Winners
- Yugoslav Cup: Round of 16

The 1964–65 season was the 19th season in FK Partizan's existence. This article shows player statistics and matches that the club played during the 1964–65 season.

== Players ==
=== Squad information ===
player (league matches/league goals)
Vladica Kovačević (28/14)
Josip Pirmajer (27/7)
Ljubomir Mihajlović (26/0)
Milan Galić (24/15)
Ivan Ćurković (23/0) (goalkeeper)
Mustafa Hasanagić (20/13)
Radoslav Bečejac (20/2)
Jovan Miladinović (19/0)
Joakim Vislavski (18/5)
Fahrudin Jusufi (18/0)
Branko Rašović (17/0)
Velibor Vasović (15/0)
Velimir Sombolac (14/0)
Milan Damjanović (11/0)
Milan Vukelić (10/0)
Lazar Radović (8/0)
Bora Milutinović (6/0)
Mane Bajić (5/1)
Miodrag Petrović (5/1)
Milutin Šoškić (4/0) (goalkeeper)
Branislav Mihajlović (2/0)
Jovan Ćurčić (1/0) (goalkeeper)
Vojislav Simeunović (1/0)

== Friendlies ==
15 July 1964 Friendly	Rudar Velenje (Socialist Federal Republic of Yugoslavia)	0–8	(Socialist Federal Republic of Yugoslavia) Partizan	Velenje

16 July 1964 Friendly	Kladivar (Socialist Federal Republic of Yugoslavia)	1–5	(Socialist Federal Republic of Yugoslavia) Partizan	Celje

22 July 1964 Friendly	Partizan (Socialist Federal Republic of Yugoslavia)	10–1	(Socialist Federal Republic of Yugoslavia) Hajduk Beograd	Belgrade

26 July 1964 Friendly	Partizan (Socialist Federal Republic of Yugoslavia)	6–0	(Socialist Federal Republic of Yugoslavia) Voždovački	Belgrade

29 July 1964 Friendly	Rusanda Melenci (Socialist Federal Republic of Yugoslavia)	1–11	(Socialist Federal Republic of Yugoslavia) Partizan	Melenci

2 August 1964 Friendly	Slavonija (Socialist Federal Republic of Yugoslavia)	1–2	(Socialist Federal Republic of Yugoslavia) Partizan	Osijek

20 August 1964 Friendly	Jagodina (Socialist Federal Republic of Yugoslavia)	2–8	(Socialist Federal Republic of Yugoslavia) Partizan	Svetozarevo

13 October 1964 Friendly	Crvenka (Socialist Federal Republic of Yugoslavia)	3–8	(Socialist Federal Republic of Yugoslavia) Partizan	Crvenka

17 October 1964 Friendly	Partizan (Socialist Federal Republic of Yugoslavia)	3–1	(Socialist Federal Republic of Yugoslavia) OFK Beograd	Belgrade
	Milovanović 2' (o.g.); Bajić 68'; Vasović 73'			Stadium: JNA Stadium; Referee: Josip Kalmar

18 October 1964 Friendly	Partizan (Socialist Federal Republic of Yugoslavia)	4–1	(Socialist Federal Republic of Yugoslavia) Dinamo Zagreb	Belgrade
	Vukelić 12'; Galić 37'; Hasanagić 53'; Kovačević 81'			Stadium: JNA Stadium; Referee: Gugić

1 November 1964 Friendly	Partizan (Socialist Federal Republic of Yugoslavia)	5–3	(Italy) Milan	Belgrade
	Kovačević 5', 32'; Hasanagić 9', 13', 53'		Ferrario 29', 60'; Amarildo 36'	Stadium: JNA Stadium; Attendance: 30,000; Referee: Vladimir Stanković

19 November 1964 Friendly	Priština (Socialist Federal Republic of Yugoslavia)	2–2	(Socialist Federal Republic of Yugoslavia) Partizan	Priština

30 November 1964 Friendly	Sloga Kraljevo (Socialist Federal Republic of Yugoslavia)	1–3	(Socialist Federal Republic of Yugoslavia) Partizan	Kraljevo

24 January 1965 Friendly	Dubrovnik (Socialist Federal Republic of Yugoslavia)	1–5	(Socialist Federal Republic of Yugoslavia) Partizan	Dubrovnik

27 January 1965 Friendly	Dubrovnik (Socialist Federal Republic of Yugoslavia)	1–16	(Socialist Federal Republic of Yugoslavia) Partizan	Dubrovnik
			Petrović; Bajić; Kovačević; Vasović; Mihajlović; Davidovic; Grebenarović

3 February 1965 Friendly	Fenerbahçe (Turkey)	0–2	(Socialist Federal Republic of Yugoslavia) Partizan	Istanbul, Turkey
			Pirmajer 33'; Kovačević 48'	Stadium: Mithatpaşa Stadi; Attendance: 5,000

4 February 1965 Friendly	Galatasaray (Turkey)	0–2	(Socialist Federal Republic of Yugoslavia) Partizan	Istanbul, Turkey
			Kovačević 9'; Mihajlović 51'	Stadium: Mithatpaşa Stadi; Attendance: 5,000

10 February 1965 Friendly	İzmirspor (Turkey)	0–2	(Socialist Federal Republic of Yugoslavia) Partizan	İzmir, Turkey
			Pirmajer 4'; Petrović 30'	Stadium: İzmir Alsancak Stadium

11 February 1965 Friendly	Altay (Turkey)	0–2	(Socialist Federal Republic of Yugoslavia) Partizan	İzmir, Turkey
			Kovačević 34'; Miladinović (?)	Stadium: İzmir Alsancak Stadium; Attendance: 3,000

4 March 1965 Friendly	Dinamo Pančevo (Socialist Federal Republic of Yugoslavia)	1–2	(Socialist Federal Republic of Yugoslavia) Partizan	Pančevo

14 March 1965 Friendly	Aris (Greece)	0–2	(Socialist Federal Republic of Yugoslavia) Partizan	Thessaloniki, Greece

17 March 1965 Friendly	Apollon Kalamarias (Greece)	2–3	(Socialist Federal Republic of Yugoslavia) Partizan	Thessaloniki, Greece

1 June 1965 Friendly	Jagodina (Socialist Federal Republic of Yugoslavia)	1–7	(Socialist Federal Republic of Yugoslavia) Partizan	Svetozarevo

12 June 1965 Friendly	Partizan (Socialist Federal Republic of Yugoslavia)	4–3	(France) Reims	Belgrade
	Petrović 11'; Milutinović 30'; Hasanagić 32', 53'			Stadium: JNA Stadium; Attendance: 10,000; Referee: Gegić

== Competitions ==
=== Yugoslav First League ===
Pos	Team	Pld	W	D	L	GF	GA	GD	Pts	Qualification or relegation
1	Partizan (C)	28	19	5	4	62	34	+28	43	Qualification for European Cup preliminary round
2	Sarajevo	28	15	5	8	52	38	+14	35	
3	Red Star Belgrade	28	13	9	6	50	38	+12	35	Invitation for Inter-Cities Fairs Cup first round
4	Rijeka	28	14	6	8	47	30	+17	34	
5	Željezničar	28	13	7	8	39	30	+9	33	

Source: rsssf.org
Rules for classification: 1) points; 2) goal difference; 3) number of goals scored.
(C) Champions

9 August 1964 1	Partizan	1–0	Rijeka	Belgrade
	Šangulin 35' (o.g.)			Stadium: JNA Stadium; Attendance: 13,000

16 August 1964 2	Crvena zvezda	2–2	Partizan	Belgrade
	Andrić 35'; Čop 79'		Pirmajer 9'; Galić 43'	Stadium: Marakana; Attendance: 70,500

26 August 1964 3	Partizan	1–0	Dinamo Zagreb	Belgrade
	Vislavski 74'			Stadium: JNA Stadium; Attendance: 45,000; Referee: Stanković

30 August 1964 4	Trešnjevka	1–2	Partizan	Zagreb
			Galić 7', 74'	Attendance: 10,000

2 September 1964 5	Partizan	1–0	Željezničar	Belgrade
	Galić 74'			Stadium: JNA Stadium; Attendance: 27,000

6 September 1964 6	Vojvodina	0–2	Partizan	Novi Sad
			Pirmajer 35'; Hasanagić 48'	Attendance: 20,000

12 September 1964 7	Partizan	4–3	Velež	Belgrade
	Kovačević 13'; Galić 19'; Vislavski 25', 26'			Stadium: JNA Stadium; Attendance: 15,000

8 November 1964 8	Hajduk Split	0–1	Partizan	Split
			Hasanagić 55'	Attendance: 15,000

11 November 1964 9	Partizan	3–3	OFK Beograd	Novi Sad*
	Hasanagić 17', 43'; Kovačević 58'			Attendance: 15,000

15 November 1964 10	Radnički Niš	1–1	Partizan	Niš
			Galić 34'	Attendance: 18,000

29 November 1964 11	Partizan	3–1	Zagreb	Kragujevac*
	Pirmajer 26'; Galić 60'; Kovačević 89'		Kralj	Attendance: 25,000

6 December 1964 12	Vardar	2–2	Partizan	Skopje
			Petrović 29'; Pirmajer 43'	Attendance: 25,000

12 December 1964 13	Partizan	0–1	Sarajevo	Belgrade
				Stadium: Marakana; Attendance: 20,000

20 December 1964 14	Sutjeska Nikšić	1–1	Partizan	Nikšić
			Hasanagić 19'	Attendance: 7,000; Referee: Milivoje Gugulović (Zaječar)

28 February 1965 15	Rijeka	1–0	Partizan	Rijeka
				Attendance: 15,000

7 March 1965 16	Partizan	1–2	Crvena zvezda	Belgrade
	Pirmajer 40'		Prljinčević 18'; Kostić 55'	Stadium: JNA Stadium; Attendance: 60,000

21 March 1965 17	Dinamo Zagreb	1–2	Partizan	Zagreb
			Galić 23', 90'	Attendance: 30,000

24 March 1965 18	Partizan	4–0	Trešnjevka	Belgrade
	Kovačević 48', 60'; Galić 51', 67'			Stadium: JNA Stadium; Attendance: 10,000; Referee: Milivoje Gugulović (Zaječar)

28 March 1965 19	Željezničar	1–4	Partizan	Sarajevo
			Vislavski 19'; Kovačević 41'; Hasanagić 69', 76'	Attendance: 25,000

4 April 1965 20	Partizan	3–0	Vojvodina	Belgrade
	Pirmajer 15'; Vislavski 26'; Brzić 49' (o.g.)			Stadium: JNA Stadium; Attendance: 25,000

11 April 1965 21	Velež	3–2	Partizan	Mostar
			Kovačević 11', 31'	Attendance: 15,000

25 April 1965 22	Partizan	3–1	Hajduk Split	Belgrade
	Hasanagić 18'; Bečejac 59'; Kovačević 77'			Stadium: JNA Stadium; Attendance: 25,000; Referee: Jakše (Ljubljana)

2 May 1965 23	OFK Beograd	1–2	Partizan	Belgrade
			Pirmajer 25'; Hasanagić 59'	Attendance: 10,000

16 May 1965 24	Partizan	4–3	Radnički Niš	Belgrade
	Galić 12'; Kovačević 14', 40'; Hasanagić 53'			Stadium: JNA Stadium; Attendance: 15,000

23 May 1965 25	Zagreb	0–3	Partizan	Zagreb
			Kovačević 35' (pen.); Hasanagić 48'; Bečejac 89'	Attendance: 18,000; Referee: Jakše (Ljubljana)

29 May 1965 26	Partizan	2–0	Vardar	Belgrade
	Kovačević 8'; Hasanagić 11'			Stadium: JNA Stadium; Attendance: 12,000; Referee: Kragulj (Banja Luka)

6 June 1965 27	Sarajevo	4–5	Partizan	Sarajevo
			Galić 4', 47', 57'; Kovačević 23'; Bajić 55'	Attendance: 20,000

10 June 1965 28	Partizan	3–2	Sutjeska Nikšić	Belgrade
	Hasanagić 26'; Radović 32' (o.g.); Vasović 86'			Stadium: JNA Stadium; Attendance: 30,000

=== Yugoslav Cup ===
28 October 1964 Round of 32	Železničar Niš	0–1	Partizan	Niš
			Hasanagić 69'	Attendance: 4,000

31 March 1965 Round of 16	Dinamo Zagreb	3–0	Partizan	Zagreb
				Attendance: 20,000

== Statistics ==
=== Goalscorers ===
This includes all competitive matches.

Rank	Pos	Nat	Name	Yugoslav First League	Yugoslav Cup	Total
1	MF	(Socialist Federal Republic of Yugoslavia)	Vladica Kovačević	16	0	16
1	FW	(Socialist Federal Republic of Yugoslavia)	Milan Galić	15	1	16
3	FW	(Socialist Federal Republic of Yugoslavia)	Mustafa Hasanagić	12	0	12
4	MF	(Socialist Federal Republic of Yugoslavia)	Josip Pirmajer	7	0	7
5	FW	(Socialist Federal Republic of Yugoslavia)	Joakim Vislavski	4	0	4
6	own goals			3	0	3
7	MF	(Socialist Federal Republic of Yugoslavia)	Radoslav Bečejac	2	0	2
8	DF	(Socialist Federal Republic of Yugoslavia)	Velibor Vasović	1	0	1
8	MF	(Socialist Federal Republic of Yugoslavia)	Miodrag Petrović	1	0	1
TOTALS				61	1	62

=== Score overview ===
Win Draw Loss

Opposition	Home score	Away score	Aggregate
Sarajevo	0–1	4–5	4–6
Crvena zvezda	1–2	2–2	3–4
Rijeka	1–0	0–1	1–1
Željezničar	1–0	4–1	5–1
Zagreb	3–1	3–0	6–1
Radnički Niš	4–3	1–1	5–4
Dinamo Zagreb	1–0	2–1	3–1
Vojvodina	3–0	2–0	5–0
OFK Beograd	3–3	2–1	5–4
Vardar	2–0	2–2	4–2
Hajduk Split	3–1	1–0	4–1
Velež	4–3	2–3	6–6
Trešnjevka	4–0	2–1	6–1
Sutjeska Nikšić	3–2	1–1	4–3

== See also ==
- List of FK Partizan seasons
