= 1959–60 Yugoslav Cup =

1959–60 Yugoslav Football Cup
13th Marshal Tito Cup

Tournament details
- Country: Yugoslavia
- Dates: 2 December 1959 – 26 May 1960
- Teams: 32

Final positions
- Champions: Dinamo Zagreb (2nd title)
- Runners-up: Partizan

Tournament statistics
- Matches played: 31

The 1959–60 Yugoslav Cup was the 13th season of the top football knockout competition in SFR Yugoslavia, the Yugoslav Cup (Serbo-Croatian: Kup Jugoslavije), also known as the "Marshal Tito Cup" (Kup Maršala Tita), since its establishment in 1946.

== Calendar ==
The Yugoslav Cup was a tournament for which clubs from all tiers of the football pyramid were eligible to enter. In addition, amateur teams put together by individual Yugoslav People's Army garrisons and various factories and industrial plants were also encouraged to enter, which meant that each cup edition could have several thousands of teams in its preliminary stages. These teams would play through a number of qualifying rounds before reaching the first round proper, in which they would be paired with top-flight teams.

The cup final was played on 26 May, traditionally scheduled to coincide with Youth Day celebrated on 25 May, a national holiday in Yugoslavia which also doubled as the official commemoration of Josip Broz Tito's birthday.

Round	Legs	Date	Fixtures	Clubs
First round (round of 32)	Single	2 December 1959	16	32 → 16
Second round (round of 16)	Single	13 December 1959	8	16 → 8
Quarter-finals	Single	28 December 1959	4	8 → 4
Semi-finals	Single	6 March 1960	2	4 → 2
Final	Single	26 May 1960	1	2 → 1

== First round ==
In the following tables winning teams are marked in bold; teams from outside top level are marked in italic script.

Tie no	Home team	Score	Away team
1	Borac Banja Luka	0–2	**Hajduk Split**
2	Bosna Visoko	0–3	**OFK Belgrade**
3	Branik Maribor	0–3	**Vojvodina**
4	**Elektrostroj Zagreb**	4–0	RNK Split
5	Napredak Kruševac	0–2	**Radnički Kragujevac**
6	**Novi Sad**	2–0	Radnički Sombor
7	Pobeda Prilep	0–1	**Velež**
8	Radnički Belgrade	1–1 (3–4 p)	**Budućnost Titograd**
9	**Radnički Niš**	3–1	Sarajevo
10	Red Star	2–2 (5–6 p)	**Partizan**
11	Sloga Vukovar	2–6	**Lokomotiva Zagreb**
12	**Spartak Subotica**	5–1	Rijeka
13	Srem	1–2 (a.e.t.)	**Dinamo Zagreb**
14	**Sutjeska Nikšić**	2–0	Vardar
15	**Trešnjevka**	2–1	Sloboda Tuzla
16	**Željezničar Sarajevo**	1–0	Proleter Osijek

== Second round ==
Tie no	Home team	Score	Away team
1	Budućnost Titograd	0–1	**Željezničar Sarajevo**
2	**Dinamo Zagreb**	3–2 (a.e.t.)	Trešnjevka
3	**Elektrostroj Zagreb**	4–1	Sutjeska Nikšić
4	**Hajduk Split**	4–2	Novi Sad
5	**OFK Belgrade**	1–0	Lokomotiva Zagreb
6	Spartak Subotica	3–4 (a.e.t.)	**Partizan**
7	**Velež**	8–1	Radnički Kragujevac
8	**Vojvodina**	7–2	Radnički Niš

== Quarter-finals ==
Tie no	Home team	Score	Away team
1	**Dinamo Zagreb**	2–1	Vojvodina
2	**Hajduk Split**	2–1	Elektrostroj Zagreb
3	**Partizan**	2–1	Željezničar Sarajevo
4	**Velež**	1–0	OFK Belgrade

== Semi-finals ==
Tie no	Home team	Score	Away team
1	**Dinamo Zagreb**	2–1	Hajduk Split
2	Velež	2–3	**Partizan**

== Final ==
26 May 1960

Dinamo Zagreb	3–2	Partizan
Jerković 14', 53'; Lipošinović 49'		Kaloperović 9'; Kovačević 73'

Stadion JNA, Belgrade
Attendance: 40,000
Referee: Fahrudin Taslidžić (Osijek)

**Dinamo Zagreb**	**Partizan**

DINAMO ZAGREB:
GK	1	(Socialist Federal Republic of Yugoslavia) Mirko Stojanović
DF	2	(Socialist Federal Republic of Yugoslavia) Josip Šikić
DF	3	(Socialist Federal Republic of Yugoslavia) Franjo Gašpert
MF	4	(Socialist Federal Republic of Yugoslavia) Vladimir Čonč
DF	5	(Socialist Federal Republic of Yugoslavia) Tomislav Crnković
MF	6	(Socialist Federal Republic of Yugoslavia) Željko Perušić
MF	7	(Socialist Federal Republic of Yugoslavia) Luka Lipošinović
FW	8	(Socialist Federal Republic of Yugoslavia) Dražan Jerković
FW	9	(Socialist Federal Republic of Yugoslavia) Željko Matuš
MF	10	(Socialist Federal Republic of Yugoslavia) Dragoljub Blažić
FW	11	(Socialist Federal Republic of Yugoslavia) Nedeljko Dugandžija
Manager:
(Socialist Federal Republic of Yugoslavia) Milan Antolković

PARTIZAN:
GK	1	(Socialist Federal Republic of Yugoslavia) Milutin Šoškić
DF	2	(Socialist Federal Republic of Yugoslavia) Velimir Sombolac
DF	3	(Socialist Federal Republic of Yugoslavia) Fahrudin Jusufi
MF	4	(Socialist Federal Republic of Yugoslavia) Ilija Mitić
DF	5	(Socialist Federal Republic of Yugoslavia) Božidar Pajević
DF	6	(Socialist Federal Republic of Yugoslavia) Velibor Vasović
MF	7	(Socialist Federal Republic of Yugoslavia) Zvezdan Čebinac
FW	8	(Socialist Federal Republic of Yugoslavia) Vladica Kovačević
MF	9	(Socialist Federal Republic of Yugoslavia) Tomislav Kaloperović
FW	10	(Socialist Federal Republic of Yugoslavia) Milan Galić
FW	11	(Socialist Federal Republic of Yugoslavia) Branislav Mihajlović
Manager:
(Hungary) Illés Spitz

== See also ==
- 1959–60 Yugoslav First League
- 1959–60 Yugoslav Second League
