= 1963–64 FK Partizan season =

Partizan
1963–64 season
- President: Ilija Radaković
- Head coach: Marko Valok (until February 1964); Florijan Matekalo
- Yugoslav First League: 5th
- Yugoslav Cup: Semi-finals
- European Cup: Quarter-finals
- Top goalscorer: League: All: Vladica Kovačević

The 1963–64 season was the 18th season in FK Partizan's existence. This article shows player statistics and matches that the club played during the 1963–64 season.

== Friendlies ==
| 4 August 1963 Friendly | Partizan (Socialist Federal Republic of Yugoslavia) | 0–0 | (Socialist Federal Republic of Yugoslavia) Vardar | Belgrade |

| 7 August 1963 Friendly | VfB Stuttgart (West Germany) | 1–1 | (Socialist Federal Republic of Yugoslavia) Partizan | Stuttgart, West Germany |

| 25 August 1963 Friendly | Partizan (Socialist Federal Republic of Yugoslavia) | 4–4 (5–4 p) | (France) Monaco | Casablanca, Morocco |

| 26 August 1963 Friendly | Partizan (Socialist Federal Republic of Yugoslavia) | 4–2 | (Spain) Real Zaragoza | Casablanca, Morocco |
| | Galić 40', 117'; Jovanović 77'; Bečejac 115' | | 20'; 65' (pen.) |

| 4 January 1964 Friendly | Alianza Lima (Peru) | 3–1 | (Socialist Federal Republic of Yugoslavia) Partizan | Lima, Peru |
| | | | Bečejac 30' | Attendance: 18,000 |

| 9 January 1964 Friendly | Municipal (Peru) | 1–3 | (Socialist Federal Republic of Yugoslavia) Partizan | Lima, Peru |
| | | | Mihajlović 15', 30'; Kovačević 38' | Attendance: 40,000 |

| 16 January 1964 Friendly | Necaxa (Mexico) | 0–1 | (Socialist Federal Republic of Yugoslavia) Partizan | Mexico |
| | | | Mihajlović 21' |

| 23 January 1964 Friendly | América (Mexico) | 3–1 | (Socialist Federal Republic of Yugoslavia) Partizan | Mexico |
| | | | Kovačević |

| 30 January 1964 Friendly | Guadalajara (Mexico) | 4–1 | (Socialist Federal Republic of Yugoslavia) Partizan | Mexico |
| | | | Hasanagić |

| 2 February 1964 Friendly | São Paulo (Brazil) | 1–3 | (Socialist Federal Republic of Yugoslavia) Partizan | Mexico |
| | | | Vislavski; Takač |

| 9 February 1964 Friendly | Moscow XI (Soviet Union) | 1–1 | (Socialist Federal Republic of Yugoslavia) Partizan | Mexico |
| | | | Takač |

| 19 February 1964 Friendly | Jagodina (Socialist Federal Republic of Yugoslavia) | 2–11 | (Socialist Federal Republic of Yugoslavia) Partizan | Svetozarevo |
| | | | | Attendance: 10,000 |

| 23 February 1964 Friendly | Partizan (Socialist Federal Republic of Yugoslavia) | 2–0 | (Socialist Federal Republic of Yugoslavia) Budućnost | Belgrade |
| | Vislavski 1'; Miladinović (?) | | | Stadium: JNA Stadium; Attendance: 8,000 |

| 10 May 1964 Friendly | Crvena zvezda (Socialist Federal Republic of Yugoslavia) | 2–1 | (Socialist Federal Republic of Yugoslavia) Partizan | Belgrade |
| | | | Kovačević 87' |

== Competitions ==
=== Yugoslav First League ===
| Pos | Team | Pld | W | D | L | GF | GA | GD | Pts | Qualification or relegation |
|---|---|---|---|---|---|---|---|---|---|---|
| 3 | Dinamo Zagreb | 26 | 12 | 9 | 5 | 40 | 29 | +11 | 33 | Qualification for Cup Winners' Cup first round |
| 4 | Sarajevo | 26 | 11 | 7 | 8 | 47 | 37 | +10 | 29 | |
| 5 | Partizan | 26 | 9 | 8 | 9 | 34 | 26 | +8 | 26 | |
| 6 | Željezničar | 26 | 8 | 10 | 8 | 37 | 43 | −6 | 26 | |
| 7 | Vojvodina | 26 | 9 | 6 | 11 | 34 | 31 | +3 | 24 | Invitation for Inter-Cities Fairs Cup first round |

Source: rsssf.org
Rules for classification: 1) points; 2) goal difference; 3) number of goals scored.

| 18 August 1963 1 | Velež | 1–2 | Partizan | Mostar |
| | | | Kovačević 23' (pen.); Čebinac 61' | Stadium: Stadion pod Bijelim Brijegom; Attendance: 8,000; Referee: Gruškovnjak (Zagreb) |

| 21 August 1963 2 | Partizan | 2–2 | Vardar | Belgrade |
| | Kovačević 7'; Galić 60' | | | Stadium: JNA Stadium; Attendance: 20,000; Referee: Zečević (Beograd) |

| 1 September 1963 3 | Dinamo Zagreb | 1–0 | Partizan | Zagreb |
| | | | | Stadium: Stadion Maksimir; Attendance: 55,000; Referee: Šestić (Mostar) |

| 8 September 1963 4 | Rijeka | 2–4 | Partizan | Rijeka |
| | | | Bečejac 47'; Kovačević 64', 74', 77' | Stadium: Stadion Kantrida; Attendance: 12,000; Referee: Cahun (Duga Resa) |

| 22 September 1963 5 | Partizan | 0–2 | OFK Beograd | Belgrade |
| | | | | Stadium: JNA Stadium; Attendance: 30,000; Referee: Zečević (Beograd) |

| 29 September 1963 6 | Vojvodina | 0–3 | Partizan | Novi Sad |
| | | | Kovačević 19', 44'; Bečejac 77' | Stadium: Stadion Karađorđe; Attendance: 20,000; Referee: Gruškovnjak (Zagreb) |

| 13 October 1963 7 | Partizan | 1–2 | Željezničar | Belgrade |
| | Galić 14' | | | Stadium: JNA Stadium; Attendance: 20,000; Referee: Strmečki (Zagreb) |

| 20 October 1963 8 | Hajduk Split | 0–0 | Partizan | Split |
| | | | | Stadium: Stadion Stari plac Attendance: 20,000; Referee: Tauzes (Ljubljana) |

| 10 November 1963 9 | Partizan | 7–0 | Trešnjevka | Belgrade |
| | Kovačević 20', 27', 59' (pen.), 77'; Vislavski 40', 61'; Radović 48' | | | Stadium: JNA Stadium; Attendance: 10,000; Referee: Kragulj (Banja Luka) |

| 17 November 1963 10 | Crvena zvezda | 1–0 | Partizan | Belgrade |
| | | | | Stadium: Marakana; Attendance: 74,000; Referee: Stanković |

| 24 November 1963 11 | Partizan | 3–0 | Radnički Niš | Belgrade |
| | Čebinac 28'; Kovačević 73' (pen.); Milutinović 78' | | | Stadium: JNA Stadium; Attendance: 45,000; Referee: Gugulović (Zaječar) |

| 1 December 1963 12 | Novi Sad | 2–1 | Partizan | Novi Sad |
| | | | Radović 25' | Stadium: Stadion Karađorđe; Attendance: 10,000; Referee: Varaždinec (Zagreb) |

| 8 December 1963 13 | Partizan | 0–0 | Sarajevo | Belgrade |
| | | | | Stadium: JNA Stadium; Attendance: 6,000; Referee: Tešanić (Varaždin) |

| 1 March 1964 14 | Partizan | 0–0 | Velež | Belgrade |
| | | | | Stadium: JNA Stadium; Attendance: 8,000; Referee: Varaždinec (Zagreb) |

| 8 March 1964 15 | Vardar | 0–1 | Partizan | Skopje |
| | | | Pirmajer 64' | Stadium: City Park Stadium; Attendance: 23,000; Referee: Cahun (Duga Resa) |

| 15 March 1964 16 | Partizan | 1–1 | Dinamo Zagreb | Belgrade |
| | Pirmajer 71' | | | Stadium: JNA Stadium; Attendance: 20,000; Referee: Branko Tešanić (Varaždin) |

| 22 March 1964 17 | Partizan | 0–1 | Rijeka | Belgrade |
| | | | | Stadium: JNA Stadium; Attendance: 10,000; Referee: Kragulj (Banja Luka) |

| 29 March 1964 18 | OFK Beograd | 1–1 | Partizan | Belgrade |
| | | | Vislavski 18' | Stadium: Omladinski Stadium; Attendance: 15,000; Referee: Škoriš (Beograd) |

| 4 April 1964 19 | Partizan | 3–1 | Vojvodina | Belgrade |
| | Galić 41'; Kovačević 78'; Vislavski 86' | | | Stadium: JNA Stadium; Attendance: 15,000; Referee: Varaždinac (Zagreb) |

| 12 April 1964 20 | Željezničar | 0–0 | Partizan | Sarajevo |
| | | | | Stadium: Stadion Grbavica; Attendance: 20,000; Referee: Branko Tešanić (Varaždin) |

| 19 April 1964 21 | Partizan | 3–0 | Hajduk Split | Belgrade |
| | Radović 13'; Kovačević 46'; Galić 56' | | | Stadium: JNA Stadium; Attendance: 25,000; Referee: M. Stanković (Niš) |

| 26 April 1964 22 | Trešnjevka | 0–0 | Partizan | Zagreb |
| | | | | Stadium: Stadion Maksimir; Attendance: 8,000; Referee: Taslidžić (Osijek) |

| 3 May 1964 23 | Partizan | 0–2 | Crvena zvezda | Belgrade |
| | | | | Stadium: JNA Stadium; Attendance: 50,000; Referee: Stanković (Beograd) |

| 31 May 1964 24 | Radnički Niš | 4–1 | Partizan | Niš |
| | | | Kovačević 47' | Stadium: Čair Stadium; Attendance: 12,000; Referee: Rukavina (Varaždin) |

| 6 June 1964 25 | Partizan | 1–0 | Novi Sad | Belgrade |
| | Kovačević 64' | | | Stadium: JNA Stadium; Attendance: 6,000; Referee: Telebak (Sarajevo) |

| 14 June 1964 26 | Sarajevo | 3–0 | Partizan | Sarajevo |
| | | | | Stadium: Koševo Stadium; Attendance: 10,000; Referee: Rukavina |

=== Yugoslav Cup ===
| 6 November 1963 Round of 32 | Radnički Kragujevac | 0–8 | Partizan | Kragujevac |
| | | | Kovačević; Vislavski; Milutinović; Hasanagić; Radović |

| 22 April 1964 Round of 16 | Radnički Niš | 2–7 | Partizan | Niš |
| | | | Pirmajer 4'; Čebinac 60', 65', 80'; Kovačević 67'; Galić 69'; Vislavski 89' | Stadium: Čair Stadium; Attendance: 15,000; Referee: Tešanić (Varaždin) |

| 29 April 1964 Quarter-finals | Partizan | 3–2 | Budućnost | Belgrade |
| | Galić 38', 64'; Čebinac 39' | | | Stadium: JNA Stadium; Attendance: 15,000; Referee: Cahun (Duga Resa) |

| 20 May 1964 Semi-finals | Dinamo Zagreb | 7–2 | Partizan | Zagreb |
| | | | Mihajlović 14'; Kovačević 28' (pen.) | Attendance: 35,000 |

=== European Cup ===
==== Preliminary round ====
| 11 September 1963 Preliminary round 1st leg | Partizan (Socialist Federal Republic of Yugoslavia) | 3–0 | (Cyprus) Anorthosis Famagusta | Belgrade, Yugoslavia |
| | Kovačević 50' (pen.), 65'; Galić 88' | Report | | Stadium: JNA Stadium; Attendance: 11,033; Referee: Kostadin Dinov (Bulgaria) |

| 1 October 1963 Preliminary round 2nd leg | Anorthosis Famagusta (Cyprus) | 1–3 (1 – 6 agg.) | (Socialist Federal Republic of Yugoslavia) Partizan | Famagusta, Cyprus |
| | Kokkinis 16' | Report | Galić 25'; Bajić 53'; Kovačević 85' | Stadium: GSE Stadium; Attendance: 6,245; Referee: Hakki Gürüz (Turkey) |

==== First round ====
| 20 November 1963 First round 1st leg | Jeunesse Esch (Luxembourg) | 2–1 | (Socialist Federal Republic of Yugoslavia) Partizan | Esch-sur-Alzette, Luxembourg |
| | May 19'; Theis 82' | Report | Galić 33' | Stadium: Stade Émile Mayrisch; Attendance: 2,921; Referee: Joseph Heymann (Switzerland) |

| 27 November 1963 First round 2nd leg | Partizan (Socialist Federal Republic of Yugoslavia) | 6–2 (7 – 4 agg.) | (Luxembourg) Jeunesse Esch | Belgrade, Yugoslavia |
| | Kovačević 18', 39', 66', 77'; Čebinac 45'; Galić 57' | Report | Langer 20'; Bach 58' | Stadium: JNA Stadium; Attendance: 8,226; Referee: Václav Korelus (Czechoslovakia) |

==== Quarter-finals ====
| 26 February 1964 Quarter-finals 1st leg | Partizan (Socialist Federal Republic of Yugoslavia) | 0–2 | (Italy) Internazionale | Belgrade, Yugoslavia |
| | | Report | Jair 48'; Mazzola 89' | Stadium: JNA Stadium; Attendance: 19,509; Referee: Josef Stoll (Austria) |

| 4 March 1964 Quarter-finals 2nd leg | Internazionale (Italy) | 2–1 (4 – 1 agg.) | (Socialist Federal Republic of Yugoslavia) Partizan | Milan, Italy |
| | Corso 25'; Jair 42' | Report | Bajić 68' | Stadium: San Siro; Attendance: 32,100; Referee: Kurt Waldemar Tschenscher (West Germany) |

== Statistics ==
=== Goalscorers ===
This includes all competitive matches.

| Rank | Pos | Nat | Name | Yugoslav First League | Yugoslav Cup | European Cup | Total |
|---|---|---|---|---|---|---|---|
| 1 | MF | (Socialist Federal Republic of Yugoslavia) | Vladica Kovačević | 16 | 5 | 7 | 28 |
| 2 | FW | (Socialist Federal Republic of Yugoslavia) | Milan Galić | 4 | 3 | 4 | 11 |
| 3 | FW | (Socialist Federal Republic of Yugoslavia) | Joakim Vislavski | 4 | 3 | 0 | 7 |
| 3 | MF | (Socialist Federal Republic of Yugoslavia) | Zvezdan Čebinac | 2 | 4 | 1 | 7 |
| 5 | MF | (Socialist Federal Republic of Yugoslavia) | Lazar Radović | 3 | 1 | 0 | 4 |
| 6 | MF | (Socialist Federal Republic of Yugoslavia) | Josip Pirmajer | 2 | 1 | 0 | 3 |
| 7 | MF | (Socialist Federal Republic of Yugoslavia) | Radoslav Bečejac | 2 | 0 | 0 | 2 |
| 7 | MF | (Socialist Federal Republic of Yugoslavia) | Mane Bajić | 0 | 0 | 2 | 2 |
| 7 | MF | (Socialist Federal Republic of Yugoslavia) | Bora Milutinović | 1 | 1 | 0 | 2 |
| 10 | FW | (Socialist Federal Republic of Yugoslavia) | Mustafa Hasanagić | 0 | 1 | 0 | 1 |
| 10 | FW | (Socialist Federal Republic of Yugoslavia) | Branislav Mihajlović | 0 | 1 | 0 | 1 |
| TOTALS | | | | 34 | 20 | 14 | 68 |

=== Score overview ===
Win Draw Loss

| Opposition | Home score | Away score | Aggregate |
|---|---|---|---|
| Crvena zvezda | 0–2 | 0–1 | 0–3 |
| OFK Beograd | 0–2 | 1–1 | 1–3 |
| Dinamo Zagreb | 1–1 | 0–1 | 1–2 |
| Sarajevo | 0–0 | 0–3 | 0–3 |
| Željezničar | 1–2 | 0–0 | 1–2 |
| Vojvodina | 3–1 | 3–0 | 6–1 |
| Radnički Niš | 3–0 | 1–4 | 4–4 |
| Rijeka | 0–1 | 4–2 | 4–3 |
| Hajduk Split | 3–0 | 0–0 | 3–0 |
| Trešnjevka | 7–0 | 0–0 | 7–0 |
| Velež | 0–0 | 2–1 | 2–1 |
| Novi Sad | 1–0 | 1–2 | 2–2 |
| Vardar | 2–2 | 1–0 | 3–2 |

== See also ==
- List of FK Partizan seasons
