= 1960–61 Yugoslav First League =

Prva savezna liga
- Season: 1960–61
- Dates: 18 September 1960 – 11 June 1961
- Champions: Partizan (3rd title)
- Relegated: RNK Split; Radnički Belgrade
- European Cup: Partizan
- Cup Winners' Cup: Vardar
- Inter-Cities Fairs Cup: Red Star; Dinamo Zagreb; Vojvodina
- Top goalscorer: Zoran Prljinčević; Todor Veselinović (16 goals each)

The 1960–61 Yugoslav First League season was won by FK Partizan, which was the club's third title and its first in twelve years. The season was also a coming-out party of sorts for the club's talented new generation of young players known as "Partizan's babies" that would dominate Yugoslav football for the next few years and would even go on to make it to the 1966 European Cup final.

The season began later than usual in order to accommodate the Yugoslav Olympic national team's late August and early September 1960 participation at the 1960 Rome Olympics where they won the gold medal with a roster consisting entirely of players from the Yugoslav First League.

== Teams ==
At the end of the previous season Budućnost and Sloboda were relegated. They were replaced by Vardar and RNK Split.

| Team | Location | Federal Republic | Position in 1959–60 |
|---|---|---|---|
| Dinamo Zagreb | Zagreb | SR Croatia | 2nd |
| Hajduk Split | Split | SR Croatia | 5th |
| OFK Belgrade | Belgrade | SR Serbia | 7th |
| Partizan | Belgrade | SR Serbia | 3rd |
| Radnički Belgrade | Belgrade | SR Serbia | 9th |
| Red Star | Belgrade | SR Serbia | 1st |
| Rijeka | Rijeka | SR Croatia | 8th |
| Sarajevo | Sarajevo | SR Bosnia and Herzegovina | 6th |
| RNK Split | Split | SR Croatia | — |
| Vardar | Skopje | SR Macedonia | — |
| Velež | Mostar | SR Bosnia and Herzegovina | 10th |
| Vojvodina | Novi Sad | SR Serbia | 4th |

== League table ==
| Pos | Team | Pld | W | D | L | GF | GA | GD | Pts | Qualification or relegation |
|---|---|---|---|---|---|---|---|---|---|---|
| 1 | Partizan (C) | 22 | 15 | 2 | 5 | 53 | 23 | +30 | 32 | Qualification for European Cup preliminary round |
| 2 | Red Star Belgrade | 22 | 13 | 5 | 4 | 38 | 21 | +17 | 31 | Invitation for Inter-Cities Fairs Cup first round |
| 3 | Hajduk Split | 22 | 13 | 4 | 5 | 34 | 22 | +12 | 30 | |
| 4 | Dinamo Zagreb | 22 | 10 | 7 | 5 | 36 | 27 | +9 | 27 | Invitation for Inter-Cities Fairs Cup first round |
| 5 | Vojvodina | 22 | 10 | 3 | 9 | 32 | 29 | +3 | 23 | Invitation for Inter-Cities Fairs Cup first round |
| 6 | OFK Belgrade | 22 | 8 | 7 | 7 | 30 | 30 | 0 | 23 | |
| 7 | Rijeka | 22 | 10 | 2 | 10 | 32 | 36 | −4 | 22 | |
| 8 | Sarajevo | 22 | 6 | 6 | 10 | 33 | 39 | −6 | 18 | Invitation for Balkans Cup |
| 9 | Velež | 22 | 5 | 7 | 10 | 27 | 39 | −12 | 17 | |
| 10 | Vardar | 22 | 6 | 5 | 11 | 21 | 36 | −15 | 17 | Qualification for Cup Winners' Cup first round |
| 11 | RNK Split (R) | 22 | 5 | 6 | 11 | 29 | 38 | −9 | 16 | Relegation to Yugoslav Second League |
| 12 | Radnički Beograd (R) | 22 | 4 | 0 | 18 | 33 | 58 | −25 | 8 | Relegation to Yugoslav Second League |

Source: rsssf.org
Rules for classification: 1) points; 2) goal difference; 3) number of goals scored.
(C) Champions; (R) Relegated

== Results ==
| Home \ Away | DIN | HAJ | OFK | PAR | RBE | RSB | RIJ | SAR | SPL | VAR | VEL | VOJ |
|---|---|---|---|---|---|---|---|---|---|---|---|---|
| Dinamo Zagreb | | 1–4 | 2–0 | 0–1 | 2–0 | 1–2 | 3–0 | 3–1 | 2–1 | 6–1 | 1–0 | 2–4 |
| Hajduk Split | 4–1 | | 1–0 | 0–0 | 3–0 | 1–0 | 3–2 | 1–0 | 1–1 | 3–0 | 2–2 | 2–0 |
| OFK Belgrade | 1–1 | 1–1 | | 2–1 | 2–0 | 1–2 | 4–2 | 2–1 | 3–1 | 2–2 | 2–0 | 1–0 |
| Partizan | 1–1 | 4–0 | 2–0 | | 3–2 | 3–0 | 1–0 | 5–2 | 5–0 | 2–0 | 3–0 | 4–0 |
| Radnički Beograd | 3–4 | 1–2 | 2–0 | 2–4 | | 1–3 | 1–2 | 4–1 | 1–2 | 2–3 | 3–1 | 3–0 |
| Red Star | 2–2 | 2–1 | 3–1 | 3–2 | 5–1 | | 2–0 | 1–0 | 4–0 | 0–1 | 2–0 | 2–1 |
| Rijeka | 0–0 | 1–2 | 1–1 | 2–1 | 6–3 | 1–0 | | 3–0 | 2–0 | 1–0 | 2–1 | 1–3 |
| Sarajevo | 1–1 | 3–0 | 0–0 | 2–0 | 3–1 | 1–1 | 3–1 | | 3–2 | 3–0 | 2–2 | 1–2 |
| RNK Split | 0–1 | 0–2 | 1–1 | 2–4 | 6–0 | 0–0 | 1–2 | 5–3 | | 1–1 | 1–1 | 2–0 |
| Vardar | 0–1 | 1–0 | 1–3 | 3–1 | 3–2 | 1–2 | 0–3 | 0–0 | 0–0 | | 3–1 | 0–1 |
| Velež | 0–0 | 2–0 | 5–2 | 2–5 | 1–0 | 2–2 | 2–0 | 2–2 | 2–0 | 0–0 | | 1–3 |
| Vojvodina | 1–1 | 0–1 | 1–1 | 0–1 | 2–1 | 0–0 | 5–0 | 3–1 | 0–3 | 2–1 | 4–0 | |

Source: DataSoccer.it
Legend: Blue = home team win; Yellow = draw; Red = away team win.

== Winning squad ==
Champions:

- FK Partizan (head coach: Stjepan Bobek)

player (league matches/league goals)

- Tomislav Kaloperović (22/7)
- Milutin Šoškić (22/0) (goalkeeper)
- Velibor Vasović (22/1)
- Fahrudin Jusufi (22/0)
- Milan Galić (21/14)
- Milan Vukelić (20/8)
- Joakim Vislavski (20/5)
- Vladica Kovačević (18/4)
- Lazar Radović (17/3)
- Jovan Miladinović (16/2)
- Branislav Mihajlović (12/5)
- Aleksandar Jončić (11/0)
- Velimir Sombolac (9/0)
- Bora Milutinović (6/2)
- Bruno Belin (5/0)
- Ilija Mitić (5/0)
- Božidar Pajević (5/0)
- Milorad Milutinović (2/0)
- Miodrag Petrović (1/0)
- Dragomir Slišković (1/0)

== Top scorers ==
| Rank | Player | Club | Goals |
|---|---|---|---|
| 1 | (Socialist Federal Republic of Yugoslavia) Zoran Prljinčević | Radnički Belgrade | 16 |
| 1 | (Socialist Federal Republic of Yugoslavia) Todor Veselinović | Vojvodina | 16 |
| 3 | (Socialist Federal Republic of Yugoslavia) Andrija Anković | Hajduk Split | 15 |
| 4 | (Socialist Federal Republic of Yugoslavia) Milan Galić | Partizan | 14 |
| 5 | (Socialist Federal Republic of Yugoslavia) Tonči Gulin | RNK Split | 13 |
| 6 | (Socialist Federal Republic of Yugoslavia) Anton Rudinski | Red Star | 10 |
| 6 | (Socialist Federal Republic of Yugoslavia) Željko Matuš | Dinamo Zagreb | 10 |
| 8 | (Socialist Federal Republic of Yugoslavia) Bora Kostić | Red Star | 9 |
| 8 | (Socialist Federal Republic of Yugoslavia) Bruno Veselica | Rijeka | 9 |
| 8 | (Socialist Federal Republic of Yugoslavia) Zijad Arslanagić | Sarajevo | 9 |

== See also ==
- 1960–61 Yugoslav Second League
- 1960–61 Yugoslav Cup
