= 1961–62 Yugoslav First League =

Prva savezna liga
- Season: 1961–62
- Dates: 20 August 1961 – 2 May 1962
- Champions: Partizan (4th title)
- Relegated: Vardar; Borac Banja Luka
- European Cup: Partizan
- Cup Winners' Cup: OFK Belgrade
- Inter-Cities Fairs Cup: Red Star; Dinamo Zagreb; Vojvodina
- Top goalscorer: Dražan Jerković (16)

The 1961–62 Yugoslav First League season was the 16th season of the First Federal League (Serbo-Croatian: Prva savezna liga), the top level association football league of SFR Yugoslavia, since its establishment in 1946. Twelve teams contested the competition, with Partizan winning their fourth title.

== Teams ==
At the end of the previous season RNK Split and Radnički Belgrade were relegated. They were replaced by FK Novi Sad and Borac Banja Luka.

Team	Location	Federal Republic	Position in 1960–61
Borac	Banja Luka	SR Bosnia and Herzegovina	—N/a
Dinamo Zagreb	Zagreb	SR Croatia	4th
Hajduk Split	Split	SR Croatia	3rd
Novi Sad	Novi Sad	SR Serbia	—N/a
OFK Belgrade	Belgrade	SR Serbia	6th
Partizan	Belgrade	SR Serbia	1st
Red Star	Belgrade	SR Serbia	2nd
Rijeka	Rijeka	SR Croatia	7th
Sarajevo	Sarajevo	SR Bosnia and Herzegovina	8th
Vardar	Skopje	SR Macedonia	10th
Velež	Mostar	SR Bosnia and Herzegovina	9th
Vojvodina	Novi Sad	SR Serbia	5th

== League table ==
Pos	Team	Pld	W	D	L	GF	GA	GD	Pts	Qualification or relegation
1	Partizan (C)	22	13	5	4	42	22	+20	31	Qualification for European Cup preliminary round
2	Vojvodina	22	9	8	5	30	25	+5	26	Invitation for Inter-Cities Fairs Cup first round
3	Dinamo Zagreb	22	10	5	7	36	23	+13	25	Invitation for Inter-Cities Fairs Cup first round
4	Red Star Belgrade	22	9	6	7	35	25	+10	24	Invitation for Inter-Cities Fairs Cup first round
5	Hajduk Split	22	8	8	6	30	30	0	24	
6	OFK Belgrade	22	7	8	7	37	28	+9	22	Qualification for Cup Winners' Cup preliminary round
7	Sarajevo	22	6	10	6	37	40	−3	22	
8	Rijeka	22	5	12	5	17	21	−4	22	
9	Velež	22	7	6	9	29	35	−6	20	
10	Novi Sad	22	7	5	10	27	40	−13	19	
11	Vardar (R)	22	7	4	11	30	37	−7	18	Relegation to Yugoslav Second League
12	Borac Banja Luka (R)	22	3	5	14	26	50	−24	11	Relegation to Yugoslav Second League

Source: rsssf.org
Rules for classification: 1) points; 2) goal difference; 3) number of goals scored.
(C) Champions; (R) Relegated

== Results ==
Home \ Away	BBL	DIN	HAJ	NSD	OFK	PAR	RSB	RIJ	SAR	VAR	VEL	VOJ
Borac Banja Luka		0–3	1–0	2–3	2–2	4–7	2–1	2–3	1–3	3–0	1–1	0–1
Dinamo Zagreb	2–1		2–3	3–2	5–1	0–0	3–0	0–0	2–0	2–1	4–2	0–1
Hajduk Split	3–0	1–0		3–0	3–2	1–0	1–1	1–1	0–1	3–3	2–0	1–1
Novi Sad	2–1	1–1	2–4		1–1	0–0	1–0	0–0	3–2	2–1	3–2	0–0
OFK Belgrade	0–0	1–0	5–1	3–0		1–2	0–1	0–0	6–1	3–2	3–1	0–0
Partizan	5–0	2–0	4–0	1–0	2–1		1–1	1–0	2–1	1–3	3–1	2–3
Red Star	2–0	1–0	3–0	4–2	1–4	0–0		1–2	1–1	3–0	2–0	2–0
Rijeka	3–2	1–3	0–0	0–3	2–1	1–3	1–1		0–0	0–0	0–0	1–0
Sarajevo	3–2	3–3	2–2	5–1	0–0	3–3	3–3	0–0		1–0	2–0	1–1
Vardar	4–0	1–1	1–0	2–0	3–2	0–1	0–5	1–1	4–0		1–0	2–4
Velež	1–1	1–0	0–0	2–1	1–1	2–1	2–1	1–1	3–2	2–1		4–1
Vojvodina	1–1	0–2	1–1	3–0	0–0	0–1	2–1	1–0	3–3	3–0	4–3	

Source: DataSoccer.it
Legend: Blue = home team win; Yellow = draw; Red = away team win.

== Winning squad ==
Champions:

- FK Partizan (head coach: Stjepan Bobek)

player (league matches/league goals)

- Velibor Vasović (22/2)
- Milutin Šoškić (22/0) (goalkeeper)
- Milan Galić (21/7)
- Fahrudin Jusufi (21/0)
- Vladica Kovačević (19/15)
- Milan Vukelić (17/6)
- Joakim Vislavski (17/3)
- Velimir Sombolac (17/0)
- Lazar Radović (16/2)
- Branislav Mihajlović (16/0)
- Zvezdan Čebinac (14/3)
- Milorad Milutinović (12/0)
- Radivoj Ognjanović (9/1)
- Dragoslav Jovanović (8/0)
- Ljubomir Mihajlović (6/0)
- Dragomir Slišković (4/1)
- Ivan Rajić (3/1)
- Miodrag Petrović (3/0)
- Vladimir Petrović (3/0)
- Bruno Belin (2/0)
- Mustafa Hasanagić (1/0)

== Top scorers ==
Rank	Player	Club	Goals
1	(Socialist Federal Republic of Yugoslavia) Dražan Jerković	Dinamo Zagreb	16
2	(Socialist Federal Republic of Yugoslavia) Vladica Kovačević	Partizan	15
3	(Socialist Federal Republic of Yugoslavia) Đorđe Pavlić	Vojvodina	12
4	(Socialist Federal Republic of Yugoslavia) Andon Dončevski	Vardar	11
5	(Socialist Federal Republic of Yugoslavia) Zvonko Bego	Hajduk Split	10
6	(Socialist Federal Republic of Yugoslavia) Josip Skoblar	OFK Belgrade	9
6	(Socialist Federal Republic of Yugoslavia) Dušan Maravić	Red Star	9
6	(Socialist Federal Republic of Yugoslavia) Spasoje Samardžić	OFK Belgrade	9
9	(Socialist Federal Republic of Yugoslavia) Salih Šehović	Sarajevo	8
9	(Socialist Federal Republic of Yugoslavia) Anton Rudinski	Red Star	8

== See also ==
- 1961–62 Yugoslav Second League
- 1961–62 Yugoslav Cup
