= Milan Galić =

Serbian footballer

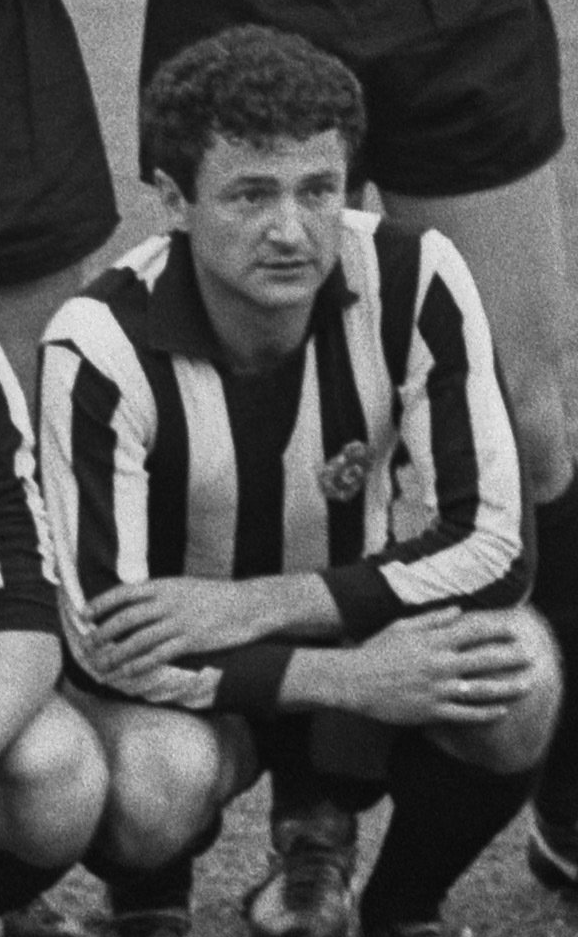
- Galić in May 1966 ahead of Partizan's European Cup final versus Real Madrid.

Personal information
- Full name: Milan Galić
- Date of birth: 8 March 1938
- Place of birth: Bosansko Grahovo, Yugoslavia (now Bosnia and Herzegovina)
- Date of death: 13 September 2014 (aged 76)
- Place of death: Belgrade, Serbia
- Height: 1.73 m (5 ft 8 in)
- Position: Striker

Youth career
- 1952–1958: Proleter Zrenjanin

Senior career*
Years	Team	Apps	(Gls)
1958–1966	Partizan	148	(74)
1966–1970	Standard Liège	84	(33)
1970–1973	Reims	55	(18)
Total		287	(125)

International career
1959–1965	Yugoslavia	51	(37)
Medal record
Gold medal – first place	Olympic Games	1960
Silver medal – second place	European Nations' Cup	1960
- * Club domestic league appearances and goals

Milan Galić (Serbian Cyrillic: Милан Галић, pronounced [mǐlaŋ ɡǎːlitɕ]; (Note: In isolation, Milan is pronounced [mǐlan].) 8 March 1938 – 13 September 2014) was a Yugoslav and Serbian professional footballer who played as a striker. He was part of the Yugoslav squad that won gold at the 1960 Summer Olympics.

During his active career, Galić played for four clubs, namely Proleter Zrenjanin, Partizan, Standard Liège and Reims. He also represented Yugoslavia internationally, earning 51 caps and scoring 37 goals, being the second-highest scorer in the history of the national team, only behind Stjepan Bobek with 38.

After finishing his playing career, Galić was employed at the Football Association of Yugoslavia.

== Club career ==
=== Partizan ===
After starting out with Proleter Zrenjanin, Galić was transferred to Partizan in the 1958–59 campaign. He spent the following eight seasons at Stadion JNA, winning the Yugoslav First League on four occasions (1961, 1962, 1963 and 1965).

In 1960–61 season, Galić won his first title with Partizan, its first since 1949. He scored twice in first match of the season, in Split against RNK Split and helping club to reach first victory in the season, 4–2. He also scored two goals in Eternal Derby in a 3–0 home victory on 30 October 1960. On 11 June 1961, Galić scored a hat-trick in a 4–2 away victory against Radnički Beograd. He scored 14 goals in 21 league matches and became the top scorer of club in the season.

In next season, Galić helped the club defend the title. He scored 7 goals in 21 matches. He scored twice on 27 August in a 2–1 home victory against OFK Beograd and also scored another two goals on 4 March at Omladinski Stadium in a 2–1 victory. Galić decided a Derby against Vojvodina in Novi Sad, on 22 October by the goal in 76th minute and also score against this team in a 2–3 home defeat. He scored an equalizer in a 3–1 away victory in Rijeka.

In 1962–63 season the club won another title. Galić scored 15 goals in 24 league matches. On 3 October, he scored his first goal in European competitions, against CSKA Red Flag. He scored a hat-trick in a 4–3 home victory against Vojvodina, on 23 September, on 28 October in Eternal Derby in a 5–0 record away victory and on 25 November in a 5–1 home victory over Novi Sad. On 9 December, in last match of autumn part of the season, he scored a goal in derby against Hajduk, in a 4–1 home win, and also scored in last match of the season against the same club, in Split, in a 1–1 away draw. Galić scored one more goal, against Dinamo Zagreb, in a 1–1 home draw of first match of second part of the season.

In 1963–64 season the club finished 5th in the league. Galić scored only 4 goals in the league. On 21 August, he scored goal in first match in the season at home, in a 2–2 draw against Vardar. He scored in a 1–2 home defeat from Željezničar, on 13 October. In April, he scored a goal in derbies against Vojvodina and Hajduk in a 3–1 and 3–0 home victories. Galić scored two goals in preliminary round against Anorthosis Famagusta in the European Cup. He continued his scoring in European Cup in a 1–2 away defeat to Jeunesse Esch. He also scored in a 6–2 victory in Belgrade. In quarter-finals they were eliminated by Inter Milan.

In 1964–65 season club return the champion title. Galić was top scorer alongside Vladica Kovačević with 16 goals. On 16 August he scored a goal in a 2–2 away draw in Eternal Derby. Two weeks later, he scored a brace against Trešnjevka in a 2–1 victory in Zagreb. On 21 March he scored a brace again in Zagreb, this time in Derby against Dinamo in a 2–1 victory. The winning goal Galić score in stoppage time. Three days later, he scored another brace in a 4–0 home victory against Trešnjevka.

Galić did play in legendary 1965–66 season, when Partizan reach 1966 European Cup final, Galić played first five matches in the league and three in European Cup. He scored in a 3–1 home victory over Rijeka, on 11 September. He played two matches against French champion Nantes. He scored a goal in 2–0 home victory on 22 September and in 2–2 draw in Nantes three weeks later. He played in European Cup final in Brussels on 11 May 1966 against Real Madrid in a 1–2 defeat.

=== Standard Liège and Reims ===
After leaving his homeland, Galić moved to Standard Liège, winning the Belgian First Division twice (1969 and 1970), as well as the Belgian Cup in 1967. He also played for French club Reims between 1970 and 1973.

== International career ==
Galić made his international debut for Yugoslavia in a 2–0 home win over Bulgaria on 31 May 1959, scoring the game's opening goal.

Galić was a member of the team that finished as runner-up in the 1960 European Nations' Cup. He was the tournament's joint-top scorer with two goals, and he also scored the first goal ever in the UEFA Euro tournament. Later the same year, Galić played for Yugoslavia at the 1960 Summer Olympics, winning the gold medal. He was the tournament's top scorer with seven goals, including the opening goal in the final, a 3–1 victory over Denmark.

Subsequently, Galić represented the country at the 1962 FIFA World Cup and scored three goals during the tournament, as the team finished in fourth place. His final international was an October 1965 World Cup qualification match away against France.

== Death ==
Galić died in 2014, aged 76. He is interred in the Alley of Distinguished Citizens in the Belgrade New Cemetery together with Mića Orlović, Franjo Mihalić and Borisav Pisić.

== Career statistics ==
=== Club ===
Club	Season	League			Continental		Total	
Club	Season	Division	Apps	Goals	Apps	Goals	Apps	Goals
Partizan	1958–59	Yugoslav First League	10	7	0	0	10	7
Partizan	1959–60	Yugoslav First League	22	10	0	0	22	10
Partizan	1960–61	Yugoslav First League	21	14	0	0	21	14
Partizan	1961–62	Yugoslav First League	21	7	4	0	25	7
Partizan	1962–63	Yugoslav First League	25	16	1	1	26	17
Partizan	1963–64	Yugoslav First League	20	4	6	4	26	8
Partizan	1964–65	Yugoslav First League	24	15	0	0	24	15
Partizan	1965–66	Yugoslav First League	5	1	3	2	8	3
Partizan	Total		148	74	14	7	162	81
Standard Liège	1966–67	Belgian First Division	22	9	5	2	27	11
Standard Liège	1967–68	Belgian First Division	14	2	4	0	18	2
Standard Liège	1968–69	Belgian First Division	23	5	1	1	24	6
Standard Liège	1969–70	Belgian First Division	25	17	6	2	31	19
Standard Liège	Total		84	33	16	5	100	38
Reims	1970–71	French Division 1	36	14	0	0	36	14
Reims	1971–72	French Division 1	16	3	0	0	16	3
Reims	1972–73	French Division 1	3	1	0	0	3	1
Reims	Total		55	18	0	0	55	18
Career total			287	125	30	12	317	137

=== International ===
National team	Year	Apps	Goals
Yugoslavia	1959	2	1
Yugoslavia	1960	14	14
Yugoslavia	1961	11	7
Yugoslavia	1962	10	8
Yugoslavia	1963	3	2
Yugoslavia	1964	5	2
Yugoslavia	1965	6	3
Total		51	37

List of international goals scored by Milan Galić
No.	Date	Venue	Opponent	Score	Result	Competition
1	31 May 1959	Belgrade, Yugoslavia	Bulgaria	1–0	2–0	1960 European Nations' Cup qualifying
2	24 April 1960	Athens, Greece	Greece	4–0	5–0	1960 Summer Olympics qualifying
3	11 May 1960	London, England	England	1–0	3–3	Friendly
4	11 May 1960	London, England	England	2–2	3–3	Friendly
5	22 May 1960	Belgrade, Yugoslavia	Portugal	5–1	5–1	1960 European Nations' Cup qualifying
6	6 July 1960	Paris, France	France	1–0	5–4	1960 European Nations' Cup
7	10 July 1960	Paris, France	Soviet Union	1–0	1–2	1960 European Nations' Cup final
8	6 August 1960	Belgrade, Yugoslavia	Tunisia	4–0	7–0	Friendly
9	26 August 1960	Pescara, Italy	United Arab Republic	2–0	6–1	1960 Summer Olympics
10	29 August 1960	Florence, Italy	Turkey	2–0	4–0	1960 Summer Olympics
11	1 September 1960	Rome, Italy	Bulgaria	1–0	3–3	1960 Summer Olympics
12	1 September 1960	Rome, Italy	Bulgaria	2–0	3–3	1960 Summer Olympics
13	1 September 1960	Rome, Italy	Bulgaria	3–1	3–3	1960 Summer Olympics
14	5 September 1960	Naples, Italy	Italy	1–0	1–1	1960 Summer Olympics
15	10 September 1960	Rome, Italy	Denmark	1–0	3–1	1960 Summer Olympics final
16	25 June 1961	Chorzów, Poland	Poland	1–0	1–1	1962 FIFA World Cup qualification
17	8 October 1961	Belgrade, Yugoslavia	South Korea	5–1	5–1	1962 FIFA World Cup qualification
18	26 November 1961	Seoul, South Korea	South Korea	1–0	3–1	1962 FIFA World Cup qualification
19	26 November 1961	Seoul, South Korea	South Korea	2–0	3–1	1962 FIFA World Cup qualification
20	7 December 1961	Jakarta, Indonesia	Indonesia	2–1	5–1	Friendly
21	14 December 1961	Tel Aviv, Israel	Israel	1–0	2–0	Friendly
22	14 December 1961	Tel Aviv, Israel	Israel	2–0	2–0	Friendly
23	16 May 1962	Belgrade, Yugoslavia	East Germany	1–0	3–1	Friendly
24	16 May 1962	Belgrade, Yugoslavia	East Germany	3–1	3–1	Friendly
25	2 June 1962	Arica, Chile	Uruguay	2–1	3–1	1962 FIFA World Cup
26	7 June 1962	Arica, Chile	Colombia	1–0	5–0	1962 FIFA World Cup
27	7 June 1962	Arica, Chile	Colombia	3–0	5–0	1962 FIFA World Cup
28	30 September 1962	Zagreb, Yugoslavia	West Germany	1–0	2–3	Friendly
29	30 September 1962	Zagreb, Yugoslavia	West Germany	2–3	2–3	Friendly
30	14 October 1962	Budapest, Hungary	Hungary	1–0	1–0	Friendly
31	31 March 1963	Brussels, Belgium	Belgium	1–0	1–0	1964 European Nations' Cup qualifying
32	18 September 1963	Malmö, Sweden	Sweden	1–0	2–3	1964 European Nations' Cup qualifying
33	20 September 1964	Belgrade, Yugoslavia	Luxembourg	3–1	3–1	1966 FIFA World Cup qualification
34	23 September 1964	Belgrade, Yugoslavia	Europe XI	2–5	2–7	Friendly
35	18 April 1965	Belgrade, Yugoslavia	France	1–0	1–0	1966 FIFA World Cup qualification
36	19 September 1965	Luxembourg, Luxembourg	Luxembourg	1–0	5–2	1966 FIFA World Cup qualification
37	19 September 1965	Luxembourg, Luxembourg	Luxembourg	2–0	5–2	1966 FIFA World Cup qualification

== Honours ==
=== Club ===
Partizan

- Yugoslav First League: 1960–61, 1961–62, 1962–63, 1964–65
- Yugoslav Cup runner-up: 1959–60
- European Cup runner-up: 1965–66

Standard Liège

- Belgian First Division: 1968–69, 1969–70
- Belgian Cup: 1966–67

=== International ===
Yugoslavia

- Olympic Games: 1960
- European Nations' Cup runner-up: 1960

=== Individual ===
- Olympic Games Top Scorer: 1960
- European Nations' Cup Top Scorer: 1960
- European Nations' Cup Team of the Tournament: 1960
- Golden Badge: 1962
- Ballon d'Or (8th place): 1962
