= Aleksandar Jončić =

Serbian footballer (1935–2018)

Personal information
- Full name: Aleksandar Jončić
- Date of birth: 9 April 1935
- Place of birth: Trstenik, Kingdom of Yugoslavia
- Date of death: 27 March 2018 (aged 82)
- Place of death: Vrnjačka Banja, Serbia
- Position: Defender

Youth career
- Radnički Kragujevac

Senior career*
Years	Team	Apps	(Gls)
1955–1956	Radnički Niš		
1956–1963	Partizan	62	(0)
1964–1965	Spartak Subotica		
1966–1968	Xerxes	77	(2)
1968-1969	DFC	26	(0)
- * Club domestic league appearances and goals

Aleksandar Jončić (Serbian Cyrillic: Александар Јончић; 9 April 1935 – 27 March 2018) was a Serbian footballer.

Born in Trstenik, Jončić won three Yugoslav League titles and a domestic cup with Partizan. He totalled 222 matches for the club and missed out on the 1962 FIFA World Cup in Chile due to a head injury.

== Honours ==
Partizan

- Yugoslav First League: 1960–61, 1961–62, 1962–63
- Yugoslav Cup: 1957
