= 1959–60 Yugoslav First League =

Prva savezna liga
- Season: 1959–60
- Dates: 30 August 1959 – 19 June 1960
- Champions: Red Star (6th title)
- Relegated: Budućnost; Sloboda
- European Cup: Red Star
- Cup Winners' Cup: Dinamo Zagreb
- Top goalscorer: Bora Kostić (19)

The 1959–60 Yugoslav First League season was the 14th season of the First Federal League (Serbo-Croatian: Prva savezna liga), the top level association football league of SFR Yugoslavia, since its establishment in 1946. Twelve teams contested the competition, with Red Star winning their sixth title.

== Teams ==
At the end of the previous season Željezničar and Vardar were relegated. They were replaced by OFK Belgrade and Sloboda Tuzla.

Team	Location	Federal Republic	Position in 1958–59
Budućnost	Titograd	SR Montenegro	9th
Dinamo Zagreb	Zagreb	SR Croatia	5th
Hajduk Split	Split	SR Croatia	7th
OFK Belgrade	Belgrade	SR Serbia	—
Partizan	Belgrade	SR Serbia	2nd
Radnički Belgrade	Belgrade	SR Serbia	4th
Red Star	Belgrade	SR Serbia	1st
NK Rijeka	Rijeka	SR Croatia	8th
FK Sarajevo	Sarajevo	SR Bosnia and Herzegovina	10th
Sloboda	Tuzla	SR Bosnia and Herzegovina	—
Velež	Mostar	SR Bosnia and Herzegovina	6th
Vojvodina	Novi Sad	SR Serbia	3rd

== League table ==
Pos	Team	Pld	W	D	L	GF	GA	GD	Pts	Qualification or relegation
1	Red Star Belgrade (C)	22	15	3	4	47	25	+22	33	Qualification for European Cup preliminary round
2	Dinamo Zagreb	22	14	4	4	48	20	+28	32	Qualification for Cup Winners' Cup first round
3	Partizan	22	11	5	6	49	29	+20	27	
4	Vojvodina	22	10	7	5	36	22	+14	27	
5	Hajduk Split	22	10	6	6	47	26	+21	26	
6	Sarajevo	22	9	5	8	35	39	−4	23	
7	OFK Belgrade	22	7	7	8	28	30	−2	21	
8	Rijeka	22	7	4	11	30	52	−22	18	
9	Radnički Beograd	22	5	7	10	31	38	−7	17	
10	Velež	22	5	7	10	27	39	−12	17	
11	Budućnost (R)	22	4	4	14	16	40	−24	12	Relegation to Yugoslav Second League
12	Sloboda Tuzla (R)	22	3	5	14	15	49	−34	11	Relegation to Yugoslav Second League

Source: rsssf.org
Rules for classification: 1) points; 2) goal difference; 3) number of goals scored.
(C) Champions; (R) Relegated

== Results ==
Home \ Away	BUD	DIN	HAJ	OFK	PAR	RBE	RSB	RIJ	SAR	SLO	VEL	VOJ
Budućnost		0–1	2–3	0–0	2–4	2–1	0–1	2–2	0–0	1–0	2–1	0–2
Dinamo Zagreb	6–0		1–0	0–1	4–3	2–0	2–1	5–1	1–0	2–0	4–0	2–2
Hajduk Split	3–0	3–2		1–0	1–1	2–2	2–0	4–0	7–1	6–0	2–0	0–1
OFK Belgrade	2–1	0–0	2–4		0–5	2–0	1–2	4–1	1–1	0–0	3–2	2–2
Partizan	0–0	2–1	2–1	2–3		1–2	0–3	2–0	4–1	3–1	3–3	0–1
Radnički Beograd	3–0	0–1	3–3	1–0	0–4		1–2	1–1	4–4	0–1	1–1	0–2
Red Star	0–2	0–0	3–1	2–1	1–1	5–4		5–1	2–1	5–2	1–1	2–0
Rijeka	2–0	3–2	1–1	2–1	1–6	0–1	0–1		1–1	1–0	4–0	0–6
Sarajevo	3–1	0–4	1–0	2–1	1–2	2–2	2–4	5–1		1–0	4–3	1–0
Sloboda Tuzla	1–0	0–3	2–2	0–2	0–2	1–4	1–5	1–5	1–0		0–0	0–0
Velež	1–0	2–3	2–1	1–1	1–0	1–1	1–2	3–1	0–1	2–2		2–1
Vojvodina	4–1	2–2	0–0	1–1	2–2	1–0	1–0	1–2	0–3	5–2	2–0	

Source: DataSoccer.it
Legend: Blue = home team win; Yellow = draw; Red = away team win.

== Top scorers ==
Rank	Player	Club	Goals
1	(Socialist Federal Republic of Yugoslavia) Bora Kostić	Red Star	19
2	(Socialist Federal Republic of Yugoslavia) Andrija Anković	Hajduk Split	18
3	(Socialist Federal Republic of Yugoslavia) Dražan Jerković	Dinamo Zagreb	16
4	(Socialist Federal Republic of Yugoslavia) Zijad Arslanagić	Sarajevo	12
5	(Socialist Federal Republic of Yugoslavia) Milan Galić	Partizan	10
5	(Socialist Federal Republic of Yugoslavia) Zlatko Papec	Hajduk Split	10
5	(Socialist Federal Republic of Yugoslavia) Radivoj Ognjanović	Radnički Belgrade	10

== See also ==
- 1959–60 Yugoslav Second League
- 1959–60 Yugoslav Cup
