= Tomislav Kaloperović =

Yugoslav and Serbian footballer and coach (1932–2002)

Personal information
- Full name: Tomislav Kaloperović
- Date of birth: 31 January 1932
- Place of birth: Obrenovac, Kingdom of Yugoslavia
- Date of death: 15 January 2002 (aged 69)
- Place of death: Belgrade, FR Yugoslavia
- Position: Midfielder

Youth career
- 1947–1950: Jedinstvo Umka

Senior career*
Years	Team	Apps	(Gls)
1951–1955	BSK Beograd	74	(11)
1955–1961	Partizan	109	(27)
1961–1962	Padova	19	(2)
1962–1963	Wiener SK	7	(3)
1964–1965	Union St-Gilloise	25	(4)
1965–1966	NAC	29	(12)
1966–1967	Olimpija Ljubljana	8	(1)
Total		301	(66)

International career
1957–1961	Yugoslavia	6	(1)

Managerial career
- 1967–1968: Olimpija Ljubljana
- 1968–1970: Galatasaray
- 1970–1972: Bursaspor
- 1973: Eskişehirspor
- 1974: Mersin İdmanyurdu
- 1974–1976: Partizan
- 1976–1978: Fenerbahçe
- 1978–1979: Radnički Pirot
- 1979–1980: Napredak Kruševac
- 1980–1982: Partizan
- 1983: Vojvodina
- 1985: Vojvodina
- 1986: Bursaspor
- 1988–1989: Apollon Smyrnis
- 1993–1995: AEL Limassol
- * Club domestic league appearances and goals

Tomislav Kaloperović (Serbian Cyrillic: Томислав Калоперовић; 31 January 1932 – 15 January 2002) was a Yugoslav and Serbian footballer and coach.

== Playing career ==
=== Club ===
Kaloperović wonn the 1953 Yugoslav Cup with BSK Beograd and the same cup in 1957 with Partizanas well as the Yugoslav First League as captain in his final season at the club. He then moved abroad to play in Italy, Austria and Belgium. He joined newly-relegated Dutch Eerste Divisie side NAC ahead of the 1965-66 season and clinched promotion back to the top tier with them in the final game of that season.

=== International ===
Kaloperović made his debut for Yugoslavia a November 1957 World Cup qualification match against Romania and earned a total of 6 caps (1 goal). His final international was a June 1961 World Cup qualification match against Poland.

List of international goals scored by Tomislav Kaloperović
No.	Date	Venue	Opponent	Score	Result	Competition
1	4 June 1961	Belgrade, Yugoslavia	Poland	1–0	2–1	1962 FIFA World Cup qualification

== Death ==
Kaloperović died in January 2002 while making a guest appearance on the Belgrade television station SOS.
