= Velimir Sombolac =

Serbian football player and coach

Personal information
- Full name: Velimir Sombolac
- Date of birth: 27 February 1939
- Place of birth: Banja Luka, Kingdom of Yugoslavia
- Date of death: 22 May 2016 (aged 77)
- Place of death: Gradiška, Bosnia and Herzegovina
- Position: Defender

Youth career
- 1955–1957: BSK Banja Luka

Senior career*
Years	Team	Apps	(Gls)
1957–1959	Borac Banja Luka		
1959–1965	Partizan	102	(0)
1965–1970	Olimpija Ljubljana	70	(0)
1970–1971	Orijent		
1971–1973	Borac Banja Luka		

International career
1958–1959	Yugoslavia U21	10	(0)
1960	Yugoslavia Olympic	2	(0)
1960	Yugoslavia	3	(0)

Managerial career
- 1973–1974: Sloga Gornji Pogradci
- 1974–1976: Borac Banja Luka (assistant)
- 1976–1979: Kozara Gradiška
- 1998–2001: Republika Srpska
Medal record
Men's Football
Representing Yugoslavia
Olympic Games
Gold medal – first place	1960 Rome	Team
- * Club domestic league appearances and goals

Velimir Sombolac (Serbian Cyrillic: Велимир Сомболац; 27 February 1939 – 22 May 2016) was a Serbian footballer and manager. He was part of the Yugoslav squad that won gold at the 1960 Summer Olympics.

== Playing career ==
=== Club ===
Following the steps of his elder brother Petar, he started playing in his hometown club FK BSK Banja Luka where he, with his team, surprisingly achieved the third place in the Yugoslav national youth championship. After this success, BSK coach Aco Mastala received a proposal to move to the city's main club FK Borac Banja Luka, which he accepted and brought along some of the players that helped him previously, between them, obviously, Velimir Sombolac. While in Borac, Velimir's good exhibitions didn't pass unnoticed, and, beside starting to represent the Yugoslav under-21 team, two seasons after he came there, received an invitation to move to one of the greatest Yugoslav clubs, the Belgrade's FK Partizan. There, playing alongside stars like Milutin Šoškić, Milan Galić, Fahrudin Jusufi, and others, he played six seasons with a total of 260 matches, being national champion on four occasions. In 1965 he moved to NK Olimpija Ljubljana where he played until 1970. Together with Mišo Smajlović, Arslanagić and, again, Šoškić, they would make Olimpija one of the most attractive Yugoslav First League teams. In 1970, instead of moving abroad, as many other Yugoslav players in that period and with his age did, he moved to Second League NK Orijent where he would play one season, before returning to FK Borac Banja Luka where he hung up his boots in 1973.

=== International ===
After having played ten matches for the Yugoslav U-21 team, and also five for the national "B" team, he was in the Olympic team that represented Yugoslavia at the 1960 Summer Olympics held in Rome, and where Yugoslavia won the gold eliminating hosts Italy in the semi-finals, and beating Denmark ( 3–1 ) in the final. Sombolac played five matches for the Yugoslavia national football team, his final being a September 1960 Olympic Games match against Italya.

== Managerial career ==
Right after retiring, in 1973, he took charge of a small regional club called FK Sloga Gornji Pogradci, that provided him with crucial experience for returning, in 1974, to Borac, to become the assistant manager until 1976. During these years, Borac played one Yugoslav Cup final, also played in the European Cup Winners Cup and gained promotion to the Yugoslav First League. Then he took charge as main manager of FK Kozara Gradiška. After three seasons there, he stayed in the club, but he found his true vocation, which was working with youth.

After the break-up of Yugoslavia, he worked at the Football Association of Republika Srpska, helping to form all the youth category teams. From 1998 to 2001, he was the head coach of the Republika Srpska official football team.

== Honours ==
=== Club ===
Partizan

- Yugoslav First League (4): 1960–61, 1961–62, 1962–63, 1964–65

=== National team ===
Yugoslavia

- 1960 Summer Olympics: Gold medal
