= NK Trešnjevka =

Croatian football club

- Full name: Nogometni klub Trešnjevka
- Founded: 1926; 100 years ago
- Ground: Igralište Trešnjevka-Graba
- Capacity: 2,200
- Chairman: Robert Brus
- Manager: Robert Jurčec
- League: Treća NL
- Website: www.nk-tresnjevka.hr
Home colours	Away colours

Nogometni klub Trešnjevka is a professional association football club from the city of Zagreb that is situated in Croatia.

Formed in 1926 under the name Panonija, since 1929 the clubs has been known as Trešnjevka. It was promoted to the Yugoslav First League in 1963 and played a European competition that same season. However, Trešnjevka never had high results in its three-year stay in the top flight (11th, 14th and 16th). After relegation in 1966, the club never returned to the First League again.

Today, Trešnjevka plays in the 3. NL where it plays its home games at the 2,000 seater Igralište Trešnjevka-Graba Stadium.

== Honours ==
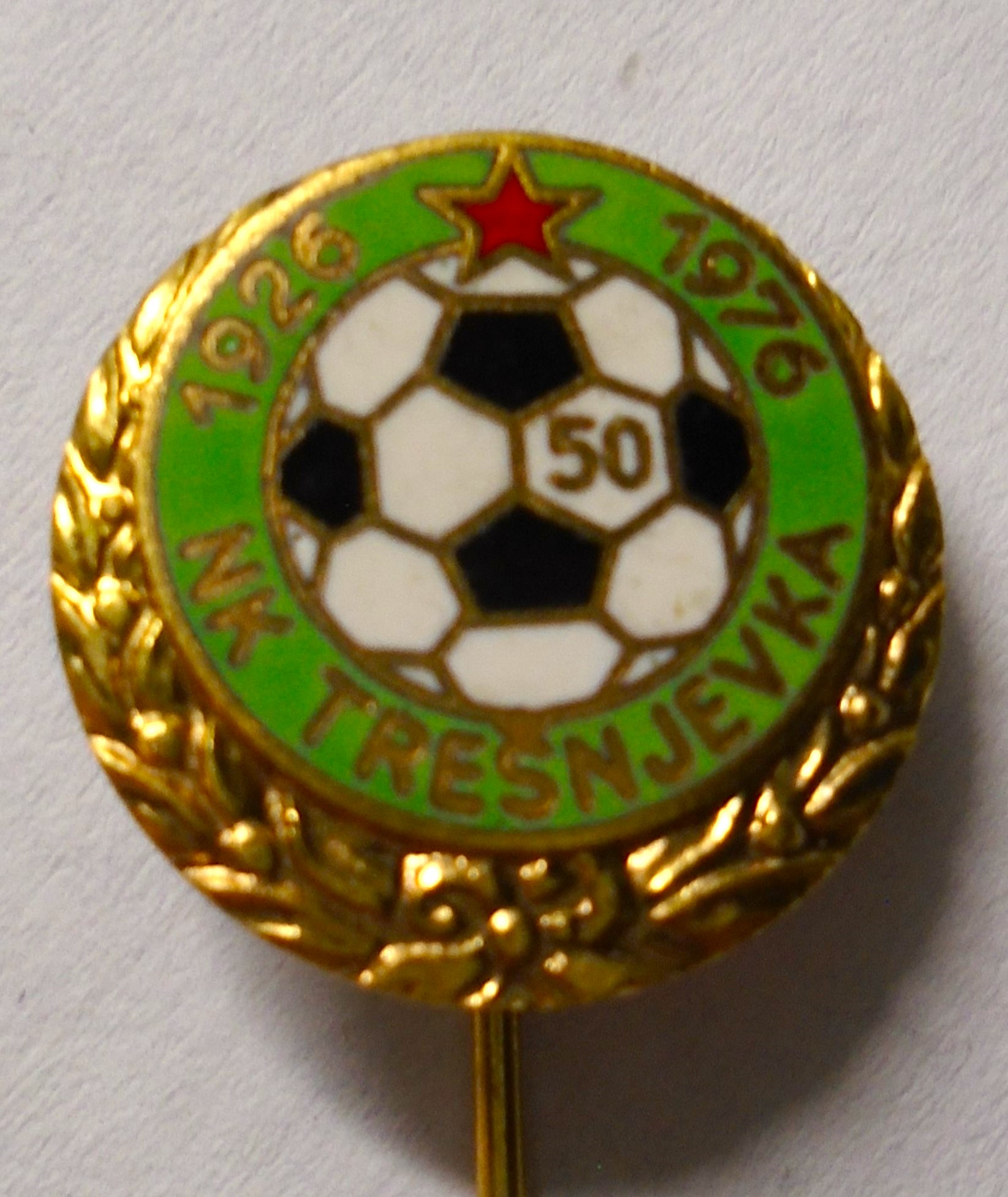
Old enamel pin badge of the Trešnjevka football club from 1976

=== Domestic ===
==== League ====
- Yugoslav Second League:
  - Winners (1): 1962–63 (west)
- First League of Zagreb:
  - Winners (1): 2018–19

== European games ==
- 1R = First round

Season	Competition	Round	Country	Team	Score
1963–64	Fairs Cup	1R	(Portugal)	CF Belenenses	0–2, 1–2

== Notable managers ==
- (Socialist Federal Republic of Yugoslavia) Ernest Dubac (1959–1966)
