= Bora Kostić =

Serbian footballer (1930-2011)

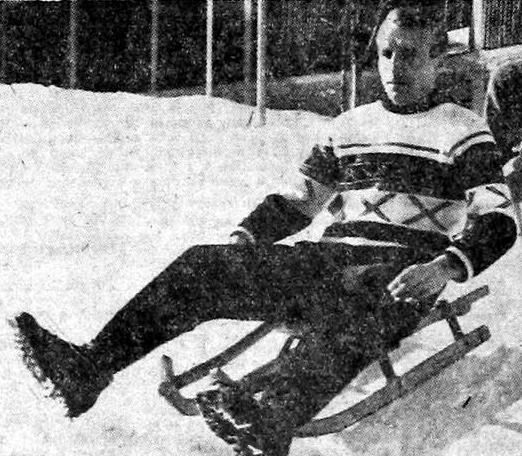
- Bora Kostić in 1965

Personal information
- Full name: Borivoje Kostić
- Date of birth: 14 June 1930
- Place of birth: Obrenovac, Kingdom of Yugoslavia
- Date of death: 10 January 2011 (aged 80)
- Place of death: Belgrade, Serbia
- Positions: Left winger; centre forward

Youth career
- Radnički Obrenovac

Senior career*
| Years | Team | Apps | (Gls) |
| 1951–1961 | Red Star Belgrade | 160 | (117) |
| 1961–1962 | Vicenza | 7 | (2) |
| 1962–1966 | Red Star Belgrade | 90 | (41) |
| 1967 | St. Louis Stars | 28 | (12) |
| Total | | 285 | (172) |

International career
| 1956–1964 | Yugoslavia | 33 | (26) |
Medal record
Men's Football
Representing Yugoslavia
Olympic Games
| Gold medal – first place | 1960 Rome | Team |
European Championship
| Silver medal – second place | 1960 France | Team |
- * Club domestic league appearances and goals

Borivoje "Bora" Kostić (Serbian Cyrillic: Бopивoje "Бора" Kocтић, pronounced [kôstitɕ, kǒ-]; 14 June 1930 – 10 January 2011) was a Serbian footballer. Normally a prolific left winger, Kostić is regarded as one of the finest Yugoslav players of his generation and was well known for his powerful shot and free kick ability. He was part of the Yugoslav squad that won gold at the 1960 Summer Olympics.

He played for Red Star Belgrade, Lanerossi Vicenza and St. Louis Stars during his club career. He earned 33 caps and 26 goals for the Yugoslavia national football team, and participated in the 1960 European Nations' Cup. Kostić was no less prolific at the club level with Red Star Belgrade, for whom he remains to this day the all-time leading marksman with 158 league strikes.

== Honours ==
Red Star Belgrade

- Yugoslav First League: 1955–56, 1956–57, 1958–59, 1959–60, 1963–64
- Yugoslav Cup: 1957–58, 1958–59, 1963–64
- Mitropa Cup: 1958

Yugoslavia

- UEFA European Championship: runner-up 1960
- Olympic gold medalist in 1960

Individual

- UEFA European Championship Team of the Tournament: 1960
- Yugoslav First League top scorer: 1958–59, 1959–60
