= Zvezdan Čebinac =

Serbian footballer (1939–2012)

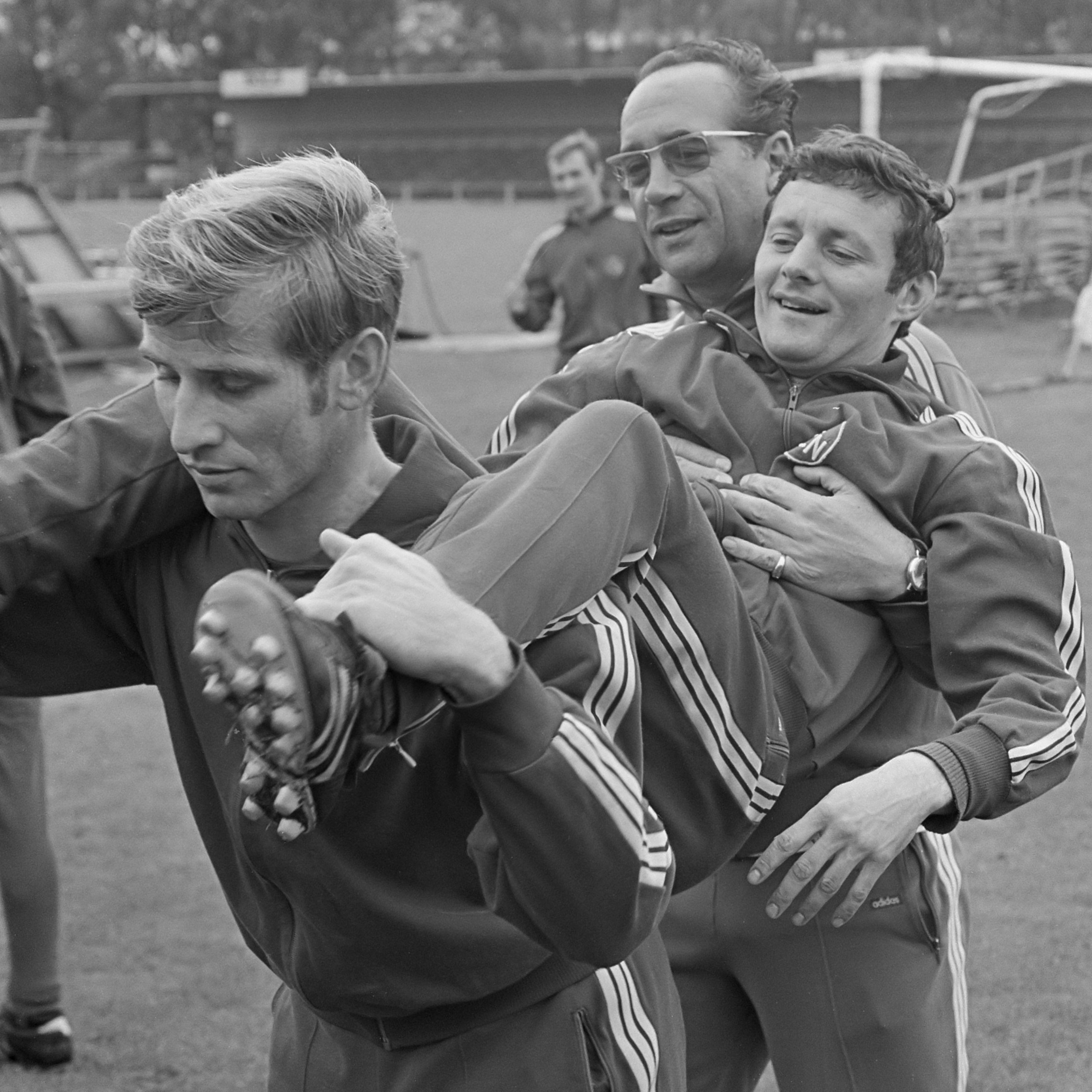
- Čebinac carried by 1. FC Nürnberg teammate Fritz Popp and head coach Max Merkel during training in 1968

Personal information
- Date of birth: 8 December 1939
- Place of birth: Belgrade, Kingdom of Yugoslavia
- Date of death: 18 February 2012 (aged 72)
- Place of death: Aarau, Switzerland
- Height: 1.74 m (5 ft 9 in)
- Position: Midfielder

Youth career
- 1954–1958: Partizan

Senior career*
Years	Team	Apps	(Gls)
1958–1964	Partizan	86	(9)
1964–1965	Red Star Belgrade	13	(2)
1966–1967	PSV	31	(5)
1967–1969	1. FC Nürnberg	55	(6)
1969–1971	Hannover 96	38	(2)
1971–1972	Germania Wiesbaden	31	(5)
1972–1975	FC Nordstern Basel		

International career
1959–1964	Yugoslavia	20	(4)

Managerial career
- 1972–1980: FC Nordstern Basel
- 1981–1982: FC Grenchen
- 1982–1984: FC Aarau
- 1985–1987: FC Wohlen
- 1987: FC Grenchen
- 1988: FC Wohlen
- 1988: BSC Old Boys
- * Club domestic league appearances and goals

Zvezdan Čebinac (Serbian Cyrillic: Звeздaн Чeбинaц; 8 December 1939 – 18 February 2012) was a Serbian football player and manager.

A midfielder, he played for clubs in Yugoslavia, the Netherlands, Germany and Switzerland and made 20 appearances for the SFR Yugoslavia national team. He had then a coaching career in Switzerland. He was the twin brother of Srđan Čebinac. With Partizan he won three Yugoslav Championships (1961, 1962, 1963).
