= Miodrag Petrović (footballer) =

Yugoslav footballer (1946–2017)

Personal information
- Date of birth: 16 November 1946
- Place of birth: Yugoslavia
- Date of death: 29 November 2017 (aged 71)
- Height: 1.73 m (5 ft 8 in)
- Position: Attacking midfielder

Senior career*
Years	Team	Apps	(Gls)
1965–1970	Partizan	37	(7)
1970–1971	Standard Liège		
1971–1972	Kickers Offenbach		
1972–1973	1. FC Nürnberg		
1973–1975	Servette		
1975	1. FC Köln	3	(0)
1975–1976	Westfalia Herne	20	(1)
1976–1977	Werder Bremen	26	(0)
1977–1978	ASC Schöppingen		
- * Club domestic league appearances and goals

Miodrag Petrović (16 November 1946 – 29 November 2017) was a Yugoslav professional footballer who played as an attacking midfielder.

== Career ==
While at Partizan, Petrović scored two goals in the 1966–67 Inter-Cities Fairs Cup.
