= Fahrudin Jusufi =

Serbian footballer

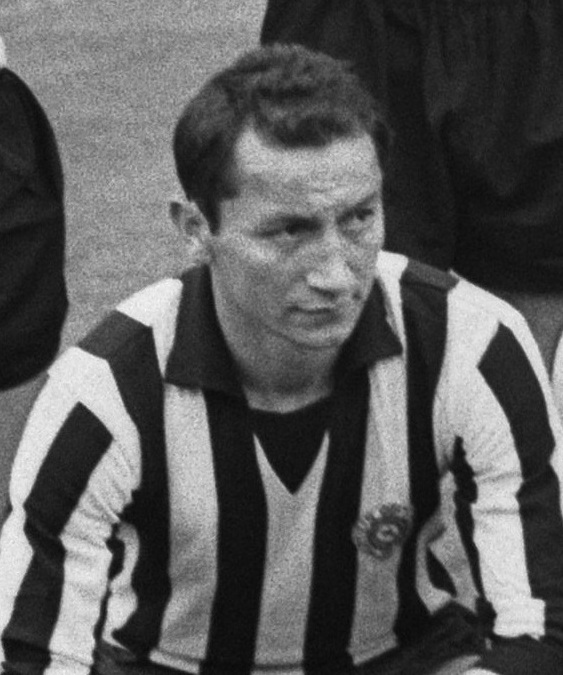
- Jusufi with Partizan in 1966

Personal information
- Full name: Fahrudin Jusufi
- Date of birth: 8 December 1939
- Place of birth: Zli Potok, Kingdom of Yugoslavia
- Date of death: 9 August 2019 (aged 79)
- Place of death: Hamburg, Germany
- Height: 1.77 m (5 ft 10 in)
- Position: Full-back

Youth career
- 1955–1957: Partizan

Senior career*
Years	Team	Apps	(Gls)
1957–1966	Partizan	162	(1)
1966–1970	Eintracht Frankfurt	111	(2)
1970–1972	Germania Wiesbaden		
1972	Dornbirn		

International career
1959–1967	Yugoslavia	55	(0)

Managerial career
- 1972–1977: FC Dornbirn
- 1980–1981: Schalke 04
- 1982–1985: SG Wattenscheid 09
- 1986–1987: 1860 Munich
- 1987–1988: Partizan
- 1989: Čelik Zenica
Medal record
Men's Football
Representing Yugoslavia
Olympic Games
Gold medal – first place	1960 Rome	Team
European Championship
Silver medal – second place	1960 France	Team
- * Club domestic league appearances and goals

Fahrudin Jusufi (Serbian Cyrillic: Фахрудин Јусуфи, pronounced [fahrǔdin jǔsufi]; 8 December 1939 – 9 August 2019) was a Yugoslav footballer who most notably played for Partizan, Eintracht Frankfurt and the Yugoslavia national team.

== Playing career ==
=== Club career ===
Jusufi was born into an ethnic Gorani Muslims (ethnic group) family in the village of Zli Potok near Dragash, Vardar Banovina, Kingdom of Yugoslavia, in present-day Kosovo. During his career, he played for FK Partizan, Eintracht Frankfurt, Germania Wiesbaden and FC Dornbirn, retiring in 1972. He was part of the Partizan squad when they became vice-champions of Europe after losing the 1966 European Cup Final against Real Madrid.

=== International career ===
On the national level, Jusufi played for Yugoslavia (55 matches), and was a participant at the 1962 FIFA World Cup and at the 1960 Summer Olympics, where his team won the gold medal.

== Coaching career ==
After retiring, Jusufi went into coaching, mainly in West Germany with SG Wattenscheid 09 in the second division, but also in 1987–88 at the helm of Partizan.

He also coached Schalke 04, 1860 Munich and lastly Čelik Zenica.

== Personal life and death ==
In a 1991 interview for Serbian bi-weekly Tempo, Jusufi was asked if he is "experiencing any problems in regards to the current political situation" and "due to his ethnicity." Jusufi replied, "Why would I be experiencing any problems? I'm a Gorani, if that even interests anyone."

His son Sascha was also a professional footballer.

Jusufi died on 9 August 2019 at the age of 79 in Hamburg, Germany.

== Honours ==
=== Player ===
Partizan

- Yugoslav First League: 1960–61, 1961–62, 1962–63, 1964–65

Eintracht Frankfurt

- UEFA Intertoto Cup: 1966–67

Yugoslavia

- 1960 European Nations' Cup: Runner-up
- 1960 Summer Olympics: Gold medal

=== Individual ===
Awards

- World Soccer World XI: 1962, 1963, 1968
- kicker Bundesliga Team of the Season: 1967–1968
