= Lazar Radović =

Montenegrin footballer (1937–2026)

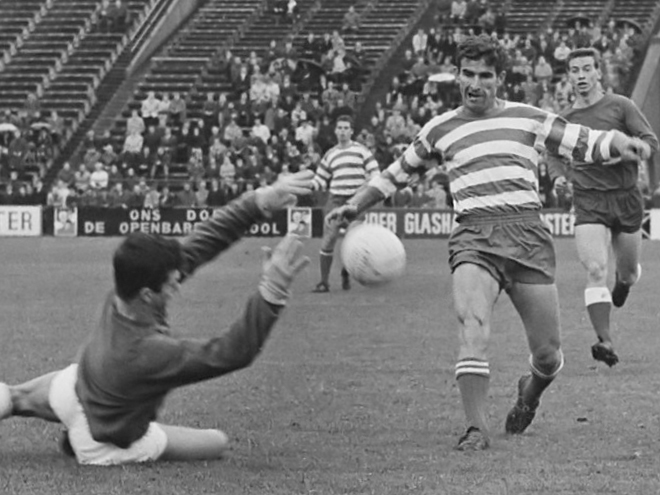
- Radović (right) with Xerxes in 1965

Personal information
- Date of birth: 13 November 1937
- Place of birth: Podgorica, Kingdom of Yugoslavia (now Montenegro)
- Date of death: 19 August 2026 (aged 88)
- Place of death: Belgrade, Serbia
- Position: Midfielder

Senior career*
Years	Team	Apps	(Gls)
1955–1958	Budućnost Titograd	71	(29)
1958–1964	Partizan	82	(15)
1964–1965	Trikala	20	(2)
1965–1968	Xerxes	87	(15)
1968–1972	PSV	121	(1)
Total		381	(62)

International career
1963–1964	Yugoslavia	7	(0)
- * Club domestic league appearances and goals

Lazar Radović (Cyrillic: Лазар Радовић; 13 November 1937 – 19 August 2026) was a Montenegrin footballer who played as a midfielder.

== Club career ==
Radović started his career at hometown club Budućnost Titograd and won the Yugoslav League title four times with Partizan when known as the Partizanove bebe (The Partizan's babies). He later played in Holland for Xerxes alongside Eddy Treijtel and Willem van Hanegem and was prepared to follow van Hanegem to Feyenoord in 1968, only to be persuaded by Kurt Linder to move to PSV where he was promised a job with Philips after his playing career. He would later work 27 years for the company in Belgrade.

== International career ==
Radović made his debut for Yugoslavia in an October 1963 friendly match against Romania and earned a total of seven caps, scoring no goals. He played at the 1964 Summer Olympics and his final international was an October 1964 friendly against Israel.

== Death ==
Radović died in Belgrade on 19 August 2026, at the age of 88.
