= Vladica Kovačević =

Yugoslav footballer (1940–2016)

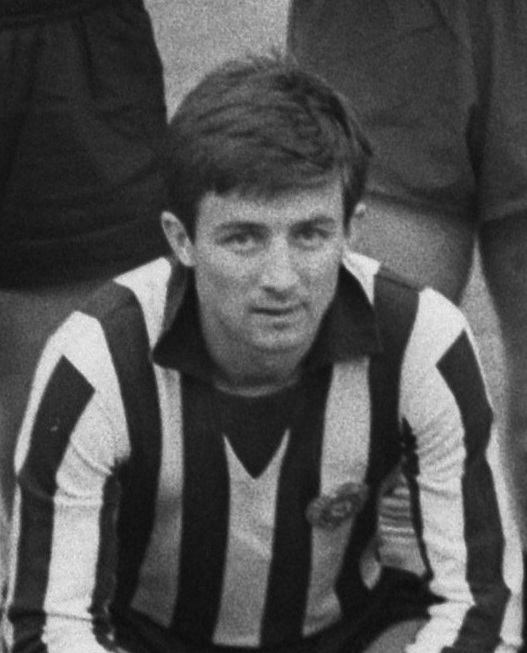
- Kovačević lining up for Partizan at the 1966 European Cup Final

Personal information
- Date of birth: 7 January 1940
- Place of birth: Ivanjica, Kingdom of Yugoslavia
- Date of death: 28 July 2016 (aged 76)
- Place of death: Belgrade, Serbia
- Height: 1.69 m (5 ft 7 in)
- Position: Forward

Youth career
- 1955–1958: Partizan

Senior career*
| Years | Team | Apps | (Gls) |
| 1958–1966 | Partizan | 151 | (73) |
| 1966–1967 | Nantes | 29 | (8) |
| 1967–1969 | Partizan | 32 | (6) |
| 1969–1972 | Angers | 68 | (28) |
| Total | | 280 | (115) |

International career
| 1960–1965 | Yugoslavia | 13 | (2) |

Managerial career
- 1972–1973: Partizan (assistant)
- 1981–1983: Lyon
- * Club domestic league appearances and goals

Vladimir "Vladica" Kovačević (Serbian Cyrillic: Владимир "Владица" Ковачевић, pronounced [ʋlǎdimiːr koʋǎːtʃeʋitɕ]; 7 January 1940 – 28 July 2016) was a Yugoslav and Serbian footballer who played as a forward.

== Club career ==
Born in Ivanjica, Kovačević moved to Belgrade in 1955 and joined the youth system of Partizan. He was promoted to the first team in 1958, making his official debut in a 2–1 home league win over Rijeka. During the next eight seasons, Kovačević helped Partizan win the Yugoslav First League on four occasions (1960–61, 1961–62, 1962–63, and 1964–65). He was also a member of the team that lost the 1966 European Cup Final to Real Madrid. Two years earlier, Kovačević was the competition's joint top scorer with seven goals, along with Sandro Mazzola and Ferenc Puskás.

In 1966, Kovačević moved abroad to France and signed with Nantes, spending just one season there. He subsequently returned to Yugoslavia to perform his compulsory military service and rejoined Partizan. In late 1969, Kovačević moved back to France and joined Angers.

== International career ==
At the international level, Kovačević earned 13 caps for Yugoslavia between 1960 and 1965, scoring two goals. He was a member of the team at the 1962 FIFA World Cup, as Yugoslavia lost to Chile in the third-place match.

== Career statistics ==
Scores and results list Yugoslavia's goal tally first.

| No. | Date | Venue | Opponent | Score | Result | Competition |
|---|---|---|---|---|---|---|
| 1 | 20 September 1964 | Partizan Stadium, Belgrade, Yugoslavia | Luxembourg | 1–0 | 3–1 | 1966 FIFA World Cup qualification |
| 2 | 9 May 1965 | Red Star Stadium, Belgrade, Yugoslavia | England | 1–0 | 1–1 | Friendly |

== Honours ==
Partizan

- Yugoslav First League: 1960–61, 1961–62, 1962–63, 1964–65

Individual

- European Cup top scorer: 1963–64
