= History of FK Partizan =

The following is a history of Serbian football club Partizan Belgrade.

== Club history ==
=== Formation (1945) ===
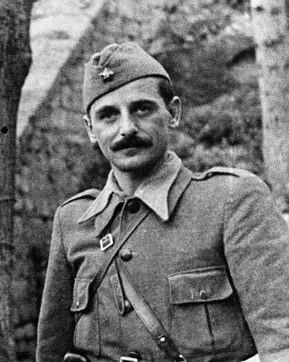
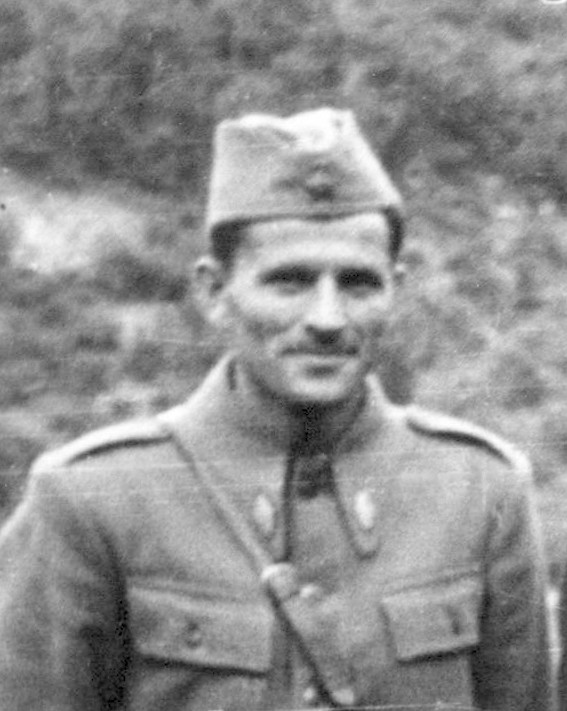
Koča Popović (left) and Peko Dapčević (right) were two of the main founders of the club.

Partizan was founded on 4 October 1945 in Belgrade, as a football section of the Central House of the Yugoslav Army "Partizan", and was named in honour of the Partisans, the communist military formation who fought against fascism during World War II in Yugoslavia. The club was formed and initially managed by the group of young high officers of the Yugoslav People's Army. Among them were Svetozar Vukmanović, Koča Popović and Ratko Vujović.

In an interview marking the 50th anniversary of the club, Koča Popović stated, "Most of us, young generals who played and loved football, we gathered and agreed to start a football club. We did not argue over what the name would be. We were Partisans, it was most natural to call our club Partizan."

Two days after its establishment, Partizan made its first step on the football scene, with the friendly match against selection of Zemun that ended 4–2. Florijan Matekalo entered the record books as the first goal scorer in the history of Partizan, while Franjo Glazer was the first manager. Just three weeks later, Partizan went on the first of many international tours, travelling to Czechoslovakia where they beat the selection of Slovak Army with 3–1. At the time, just months after the World War II in Yugoslavia ended, no organized football competition was yet restored, so Partizan played only friendly games and tournaments both home and abroad. The club's first European engagement was a meeting against another army side, CSKA Moscow from what was then Soviet Union, in 1945.

=== Early years (1946–1958) ===
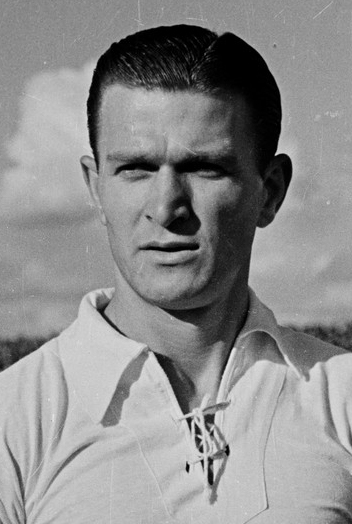
Club legend Stjepan Bobek, voted Partizan's best player of all time in 1995.

Finally, in late August, 1946, the new Yugoslav league started, so Partizan played its first official match, beating Pobeda Skoplje with 1–0. Since the club had the highest ambitions from the very beginning, it attracted some of the best players from all over the country: Stjepan Bobek, Miroslav Brozović, Zlatko Čajkovski, Kiril Simonovski, Bela Palfi, Franjo Rupnik, Prvoslav Mihajlović, Aleksandar Atanacković, Miodrag Jovanović, Vladimir Firm, Ratko Čolić and Franjo Šoštarić. Prominent football expert Illés Spitz became the manager, and spent next 14 years on various positions in the club. His implementation of top European training methods and playing tactics, combined with technically gifted squad, proved essential in winning the first championship in debut season, along with the first cup title, thus the first Double winner in the country. The second championship title was won in 1948–49 season. Partizan played its home games on the old BSK stadium until 1949, when its own stadium was built on the same site and named JNA Stadium (Stadium of Yugoslav People's Army). In 1950, the club evolved from a football section of the Army into independent club under the umbrella organization JSD Partizan (Yugoslav Sports Association Partizan). The first club's president became Ratko Vujović. In 1953, the remaining formal connections between the club and the Army ceased. Although during the 1950s Partizan had a very strong squad, led by national team players like Bobek, Čajkovski, Miloš Milutinović, Marko Valok, Bruno Belin, Tomislav Kaloperović and Branko Zebec, the club had a long break without winning a championship, only winning cup titles in 1952, 1954 and 1957. Despite the absence of domestic titles, Partizan's great performances on high quality tournaments throughout Europe gained them significant continental reputation. On 4 September 1955, Partizan participated in the first ever European Cup match, in Lisbon against Sporting. The final result was 3–3, with Milutinović becoming the first scorer in a most prestigious club competition in Europe.

=== Partizan's babies - the first European final (1958–1966) ===

1966 European Cup Final starting lineup (coach: Abdulah Gegić)

By the mid-1950s, the first big Partizan generation was well over its peak. Only two titles and four cups in first 15 years of existence were not enough for a club of Partizan's stature, ambition and popularity. In 1958, club left way behind 13 years of playing in blue-red kits and adopted the now famous black and white colors. The change in a club's image and appearance was followed by radical changes in the playing squad. The number of young players, offsprings of Partizan's own youth ranks known as Partizanove bebe (The Partizan's babies), soon emerged into one of the best generations Europe's ever seen. The rise of the generation began with Milutin Šoškić, Fahrudin Jusufi, Jovan Miladinović, Velibor Vasović, Milan Galić, Ilija Mitić, Zvezdan Čebinac and Vladica Kovačević. Very soon, they were joined by Lazar Radović, Velimir Sombolac, Ljubomir Mihajlović and Mustafa Hasanagić, and finally Ivan Ćurković, Josip Pirmajer, Branko Rašović and Radoslav Bečejac. Managers Spitz, Matekalo and Bobek monitored and guided their development. The decision to rely mostly on talented youngsters scouted throughout the country quickly gave results – Partizan took three consecutive championship titles, in 1961, 1962 and 1963, the first title hat-trick in the Yugoslav First League. Efficient and attractive performances earned the club its popular nickname Parni valjak (The Steamroller). In 1964–65 season, the team added the fourth title in five years (interrupted by city rival Red Star during the 1963–64 season). As early as the 60s, a fierce and intense rivalry grew up between Partizan and Red Star.

The 1965–66 European Cup campaign was the crown of this generation's career. After eliminating French FC Nantes (2–0, 2–2) and German champion Werder Bremen (3–0, 1–0) in the first two rounds, Partizan were drawn against Sparta Prague in the quarterfinals. In the first leg, held in Prague, Partizan suffered a hard 4–1 defeat. Although they were not given any chances in the return leg in Belgrade, Partizan pulled off a convincing 5–0 win in front of 50.000 spectators, and with aggregate score 6–4 qualified for the semifinals. The semi-finals would see Partizan taking part in an emotional tie that would bring Manchester United, in their first season back in the European Cup after the Munich disaster, returning to the scene of their final game, at the JNA Stadium, before embarking on that fateful journey home (on the way home from a European Cup quarter-final victory against Red Star, which was played at JNA Stadium, the aircraft carrying the Manchester United players, officials and journalists crashed while attempting to take off after refuelling in Munich).Manchester United, led by George Best and Bobby Charlton, awaited finally them on the last step to the finals. Partizan won in a first leg on JNA Stadium with 2–0, and resisted the heavy pressure on Old Trafford, conceding only once, so with 2–1 on aggregate they eliminated English giants. Partizan's babies achieved the greatest success in history of Partizan, a place in 1966 European Cup final against the famous Real Madrid. The final game was played on 11 May, at Heysel Stadium, Brussels. Until 70th minute Partizan was 1–0 up (goal by Velibor Vasović), but lost to the Spaniards 2–1 at the end. Partizan may have come close to a famous victory, but they had now missed their chance as the side was immediately broken up with their star players heading west. Still, Partizan became the first club from the Balkans and Eastern Europe to have played in a European Cup final.

=== Crisis (1966–1976) ===
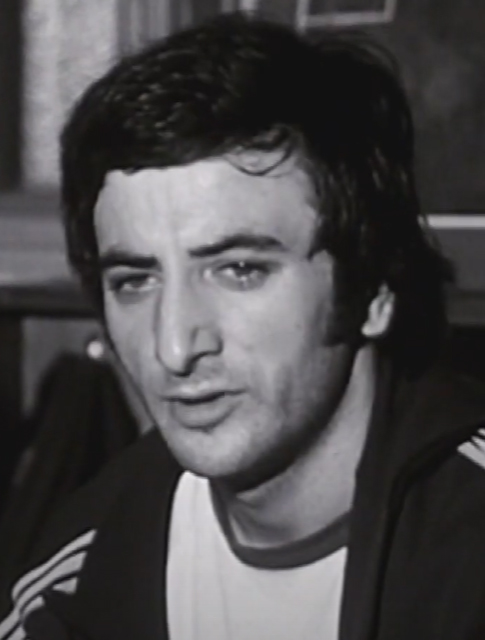
Club legend Momčilo Vukotić who played for Partizan from 1968 to 1978 and again from 1979 to 1984.

The sudden increase in the reputation of Partizan team was not followed by increase in the organizational structure. After the defeat in the finals, club administration failed to operate on a higher level, and Partizan entered a long organizational crisis. All main players signed contracts with biggest western clubs, and the promising generation was scattered. Milutin Šoškić went to 1. FC Köln, Milan Galić to Standard Liège, Vladica Kovačević to FC Nantes, Fahrudin Jusufi to Eintracht Frankfurt and Velibor Vasović, who had scored in the final, was transferred to Ajax Amsterdam where he would come to feature again in the story of the European Cup. This was a period of mediocre results, and for a decade not a single trophy was won. Few players remained from the previous generation – Milan Damjanović, Blagoje Paunović and Borivoje Đorđević. In a short period of time, numerous managers were in position. The arrival of the talented young players Momčilo Vukotić, who came through Partizan's youth ranks, and Nenad Bjeković from Proleter Zrenjanin, announced better days for the Black & Whites.

=== The brief return - the first European trophy (1976–1982) ===
On 11 July 1976, in Ljubljana, Partizan played the last game of the season against Olimpija and needed a win to clinch the title ahead of rivals Hajduk Split. In the last second before the final whistle Bjeković scored the winning goal and Partizan won 0–1. The 7th championship trophy was finally won, after full decade of waiting, by the new generation of players, such as Momčilo Vukotić, Nenad Bjeković, Rešad Kunovac, Ilija Zavišić, Refik Kozić, Ivan Golac, Radmilo Ivančević, Boško Đorđević, Nenad Stojković. Partizan won its 8th title in 1977–78 season, enforced with Nikica Klinčarski, Petar Borota, Slobodan Santrač, Aco Trifunović, Dževad Prekazi, Pavle Grubješić. The same year Partizan won its first European trophy, the Mitropa Cup. The Black & Whites finished first in Group A, ahead of Perugia and Zbrojovka Brno and defeated Hungarian side Honvéd in the finals by 1–0. The manager was Ante Mladinić. Unexpectedly, the next 1978–79 season turned out to be the worst in Partizan history. They finished 15th in the league, barely avoiding relegation with a 4–2 victory against Budućnost in the last fixture. The new crisis was serious, which reflected in the results next season, when Partizan finished 13th. It took a two more seasons, but Partizan eventually recovered.

=== Memorable years (1982–1991) ===
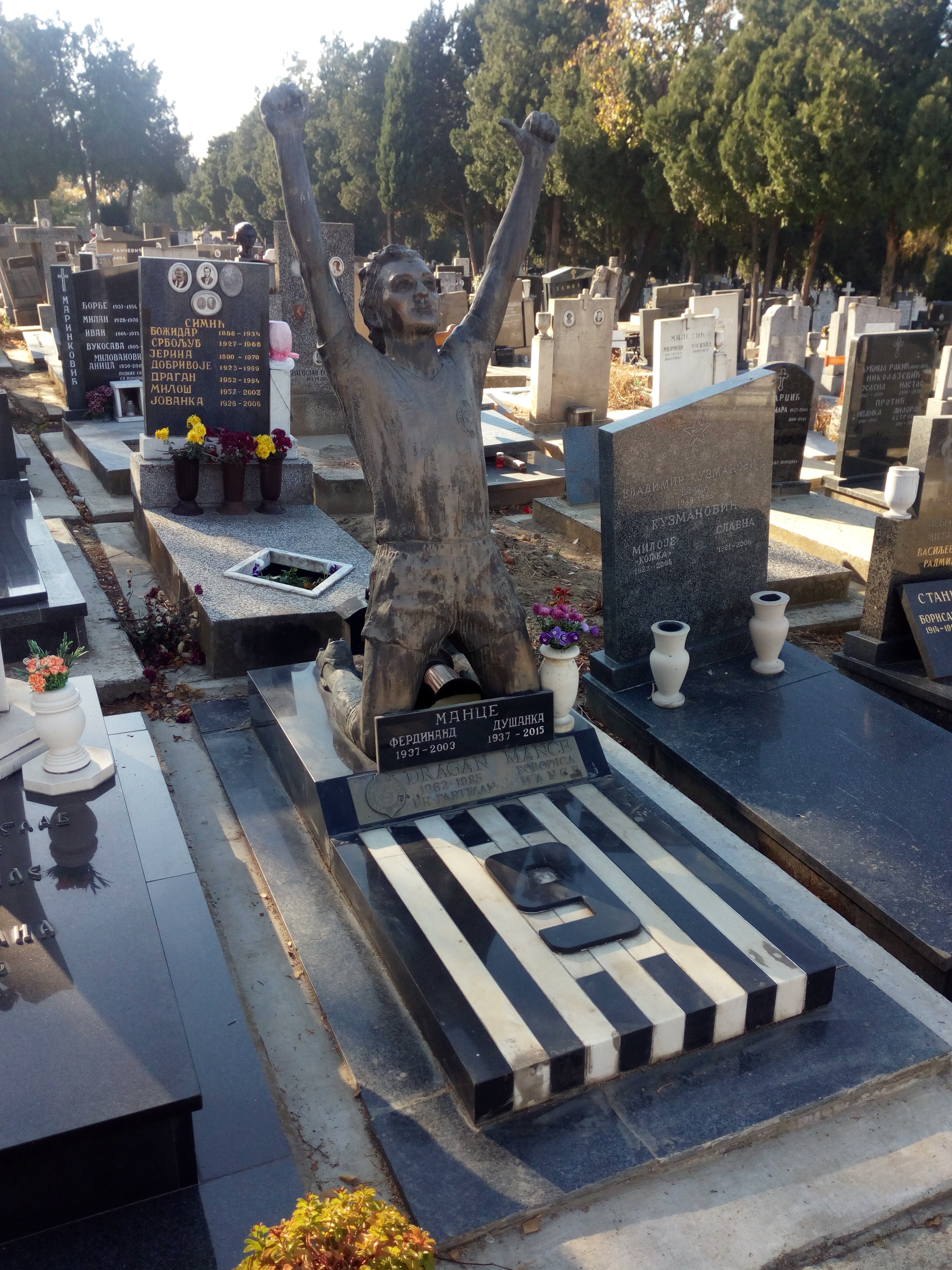
The untimely death of star player Dragan Mance in a 1985 traffic collision made him into a club legend.

When Momčilo Vukotić, Nenad Stojković, Nikica Klinčarski were joined by Ljubomir Radanović, Zvonko Živković, Zoran Dimitrijević and Dragan Mance, another great generation was formed. Partizan became champion for 1982/83 season, in large part due to extraordinary performances of young Dragan Mance. He helped Partizan win the league by scoring 15 goals, and immediately became a fan favourite. He also led the club in their 1984–85 UEFA Cup second round tie against Queens Park Rangers, one of the most memorable matches in the club's history. QPR won the first leg 6–2, but Partizan advanced after a 4–0 return victory. A goal which Mance scored against the English side is considered as one of the most remarkable goals in the history of Partizan. That match was voted on the 70th position among Top 100 greatest matches in the history of football, in a poll organized by Eurosport in September 2009. On 3 September 1985, the players tragically lost their teammate and the fans lost their idol – Mance died in a car crash on Novi Sad-Belgrade highway. He was only 22 years old, and at the peak of his popularity. Even today, Dragan Mance is considered to be the greatest club legend by the fans of Partizan. In his honour, the street next to the club's stadium in Belgrade carries his name since 2011.

In 1985–86 season, Partizan won the title with a 4–0 win over Željezničar, due to better goal difference than second-placed Red Star. However, Yugoslav FA president Slavko Šajber decided that the entire last round of fixtures had to be replayed, after accusations that certain results had been fixed. Partizan refused to replay its match, after which the game was awarded 3–0 to Željezničar, and the title was given to Red Star, who got to play in 1986–87 European Cup. Because of these events, twelve clubs started the next 1986–87 season with a deduction of 6 points, Partizan among them. Vardar, who had not been deducted 6 points, won the title, and participated in 1987–88 European Cup. However, after a sequence of appeals and lawsuits which eventually led to Yugoslav Constitutional Court, the original final table of 1985–86 season, with Partizan as champions, was officially recognized in mid-1987. Also, the points deduction from 1986–87 season was annulled, and the title was given to Partizan, who headed the table without the deduction. These controversial events prevented the generation of Milko Đurovski, Fahrudin Omerović, Zvonko Varga, Vladimir Vermezović, Admir Smajić, Goran Stevanović, Nebojša Vučićević, Miloš Đelmaš, Srečko Katanec, Fadil Vokrri and Bajro Župić from showing their full potential in Europe.

Partizan spent the final years in Yugoslavia undergoing significant organizational changes. In 1989, former goalkeeper Ivan Ćurković became club president while Mirko Marjanović became the president of Partizan's executive board. Most important Partizan players in this final years were Predrag Mijatović, Slaviša Jokanović, Predrag Spasić, Dragoljub and Branko Brnović, Budimir Vujačić, Vujadin Stanojković, Darko Milanič and Džoni Novak. However, this great generation was overshadowed by their crosstown rival Red Star and its rampage through domestic league, Europe and the World. Partizan only won the 1989 national cup, 32 years after the last victory in that competition. The last trophy won before the breakup of Yugoslavia was the 1989 Yugoslav Super Cup, the first and the only one organized. In 1987, Partizan signed Chinese national team players Jia Xiuquan and Liu Haiguang and they entered history as they, along Xie Yuxin and Gu Guangming, were the first Chinese footballers ever to have played in Europe.

=== Dark decade and domestic success (1990s) ===
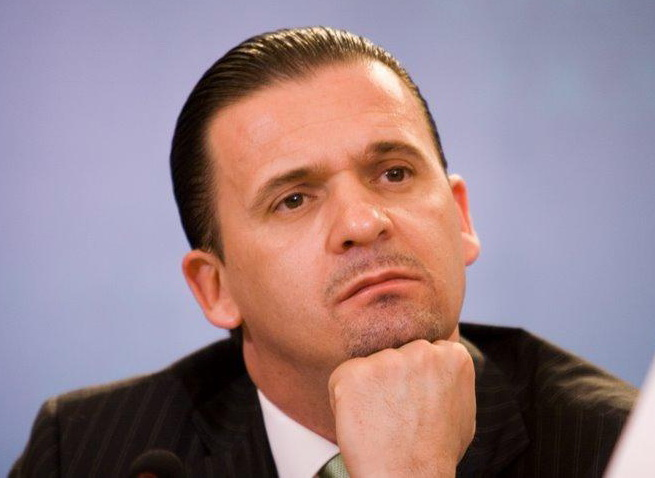
Former Partizan striker Predrag Mijatović.

After the death of President Josip Broz Tito in 1980, ethnic tension grew in Yugoslavia, with the follow, that in the early 1990s the Yugoslav state began to fall apart, and the civil war broke out. At the end of May in 1992, the United Nations Security Council imposed sanctions against the country, which led to political isolation, economic decline and hyperinflation of the Yugoslav dinar, and finally dislodged Yugoslav football from the international scene. The disintegration of Yugoslavia, the Yugoslav wars from 1991 to 1995, the resulting difficulties, as well as the sanctions had hit all Yugoslav clubs hard. After the breakup of SFR Yugoslavia in 1991, a new Yugoslavia was formed out from Serbia and Montenegro and was named FR Yugoslavia. Anyway, Partizan won during the war two titles consecutively: 1993 and 1994. Next two championships Partizan won in 1996 and 1997. But after only few years of peace, the Yugoslav clubs stood again before difficult times. Between 1998 and 1999, peace was broken again, because the situation in Kosovo worsened with continued clashes between Yugoslav security forces and the UÇK. The confrontations led to the Kosovo War and finally to the NATO bombing of Yugoslavia, which started 4 days after the 112th Red Star - Partizan derby, and this without UN Mandate, and thus without the permission of the UN. The bombing campaign was criticized, especially for the number of civilian casualties that resulted from the bombing. By this time, Partizan won in 1999 a further championship title, again during a war.

Under the management of Ljubiša Tumbaković, the club won several national cups in the 1990s. In 1997, Partizan was reintroduced to European competitions following UEFA's ban on clubs from FR Yugoslavia. However, while the national team regained the position it had held in the spring of 1992, the clubs had their results erased and were treated as beginners in the European competitions. The 1990s were marked by numerous team changes: successive seasons saw star players sold to richer European clubs, only to be replaced by new talent. Many players are credited with the club's successes of the 1990s. These include Predrag Mijatović, Slaviša Jokanović, Savo Milošević, Albert Nađ, Dragan Ćirić, Zoran Mirković, Saša Ćurčić, Branko Brnović, Goran Pandurović, Dražen Bolić, Niša Saveljić, Damir Čakar, Budimir Vujačić, Ivan Tomić, Georgi Hristov, Đorđe Tomić, Ivica Kralj, Mateja Kežman, amongst others.

=== Domination in Serbia and reestablishment in Europe (2000–2012) ===
In the first 12 years of the 2000s, Partizan won 8 national championships, 4 cups and qualified two times for the UEFA Champions League and five times for the UEFA Europa League. Led by Ljubiša Tumbaković, the club won two consecutive championship titles: 2001–02 and 2002–03. In Europe, Partizan didn't have too much success in those seasons. But next one, will become the best season in UEFA after the 1965–66 European Cup season, where they achieved the 1966 European Cup Final.

==== First time in Champions League (2003–2007) ====
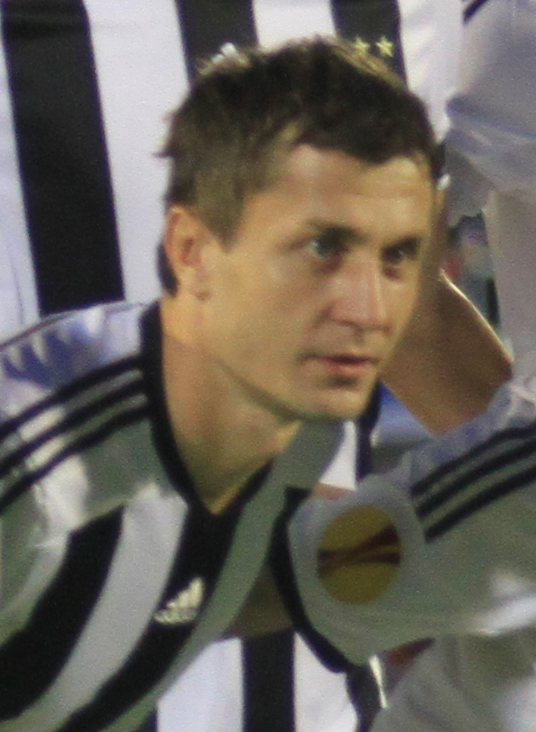
Club legend Saša Ilić.

The club's management took the 2003 season very seriously so, they appointed as the new coach the former World Player of the Year Lothar Matthäus, and brought some top and experienced players like Taribo West from 1.FC Kaiserslautern, Ljubinko Drulović from Benfica and Tomasz Rząsa from Feyenoord. For the first time in its history, the club played in the UEFA Champions League after eliminating Bobby Robson′s Newcastle United with its star Alan Shearer. In Belgrade, Partizan lost by 0–1, but in rematch at St James' Park, they won by Ivica Iliev's goal in regular time and achieved the group stages after penalty shoot-out. Later on, Partizan was drawn in a tough group with Real Madrid (the previous year's semi-finalist), with Porto (the winner of the UEFA Cup and the eventual winner of the competition) and Marseille (the eventual runner-up of the season's UEFA Cup). The Partizan Stadium was a tough ground for the opposition and the team did not lose a home match, playing 0–0 with the famous Galácticos Real Madrid side which included Zinedine Zidane, Ronaldo, Luís Figo, Roberto Carlos, Raúl and David Beckham; and 1–1 with Porto, led by manager José Mourinho; and Marseille with its superstars Fabien Barthez and Didier Drogba, while playing some inspired football in the away match in Madrid (0–1), Marseille (0–3) and Porto (1–2). They are the first—and so far only—Serbian club to qualify for the main draw of this elite European club competition since its inception in 1992.

Playing in Europe was reflected in the championship and the Partizan lost the title. New coach Vladimir Vermezović taken the charge of a team and he superiorly won the championship in 2005. Also, he became the only coach who has taken the team to the knockout stage of a European competition since new format. That happened in the 2004–05 UEFA Cup, where Partizan reached the round-of-16. Later on, he was eliminated by CSKA Moscow, the eventual winner of the competition. Poor results in domestic and international competitions in 2006 have prompted the club's officials to look for a new head coach. First Jürgen Röber and later on Miodrag Ješić didn't succeed to bring back the domestic title. Although Partizan has qualified for the 2006 UEFA Cup group stage, that season was failure.

==== Period under coach Slaviša Jokanović (2007–2009) ====
Former Partizan player Slaviša Jokanović were appointed as a new head coach. Also, the club added a new sport director, chosen was Ivan Tomić. The club strengthened its squad with some foreigners like Juca, Almami Moreira and Lamine Diarra. After two years, these changes will bring back the home trophies. The seasons 2007–08 and 2008–09 will remain as one of the most successful in club's domestic history. In season 2008–09, the club successfully defended their league and cup double from 2007 to 2008 season, for the first time in its history. But in Europe, Partizan suffered a real shock. The UEFA expelled Partizan from the 2007–08 UEFA Cup season and fined €30,056 due to crowd trouble at their away qualifying match against HŠK Zrinjski Mostar, which forced the match to be interrupted for 10 minutes. UEFA judged travelling Partizan fans to have been the culprits of the trouble, but Partizan were allowed to play the return leg while the appeal was being processed. However, Partizan's appeal was rejected and Zrinjski Mostar qualified for the next round, although Partizan beat them by an aggregate score of 11–1. Next season, enforced with Brazilian striker Cléo, Partizan demolished Welsh champions F.C. Rhyl, with a score of 8–0 (12–0 on agg.) on 21 July 2009. This score is their largest ever winning margin in European competitions. After relegation from Champions League, Partizan qualified two consecutive seasons for the 2nd tier of UEFA competition. The Black & Whites played in the 2008 UEFA Cup and 2009 Europa League group stage but same as in 2007, the club didn't advanced any further.

==== Recent years (2010–present) ====

Partizan's starting XI under coach Aleksandar Stanojević in their UEFA Champions League group stage match with Arsenal on 8 December 2010.

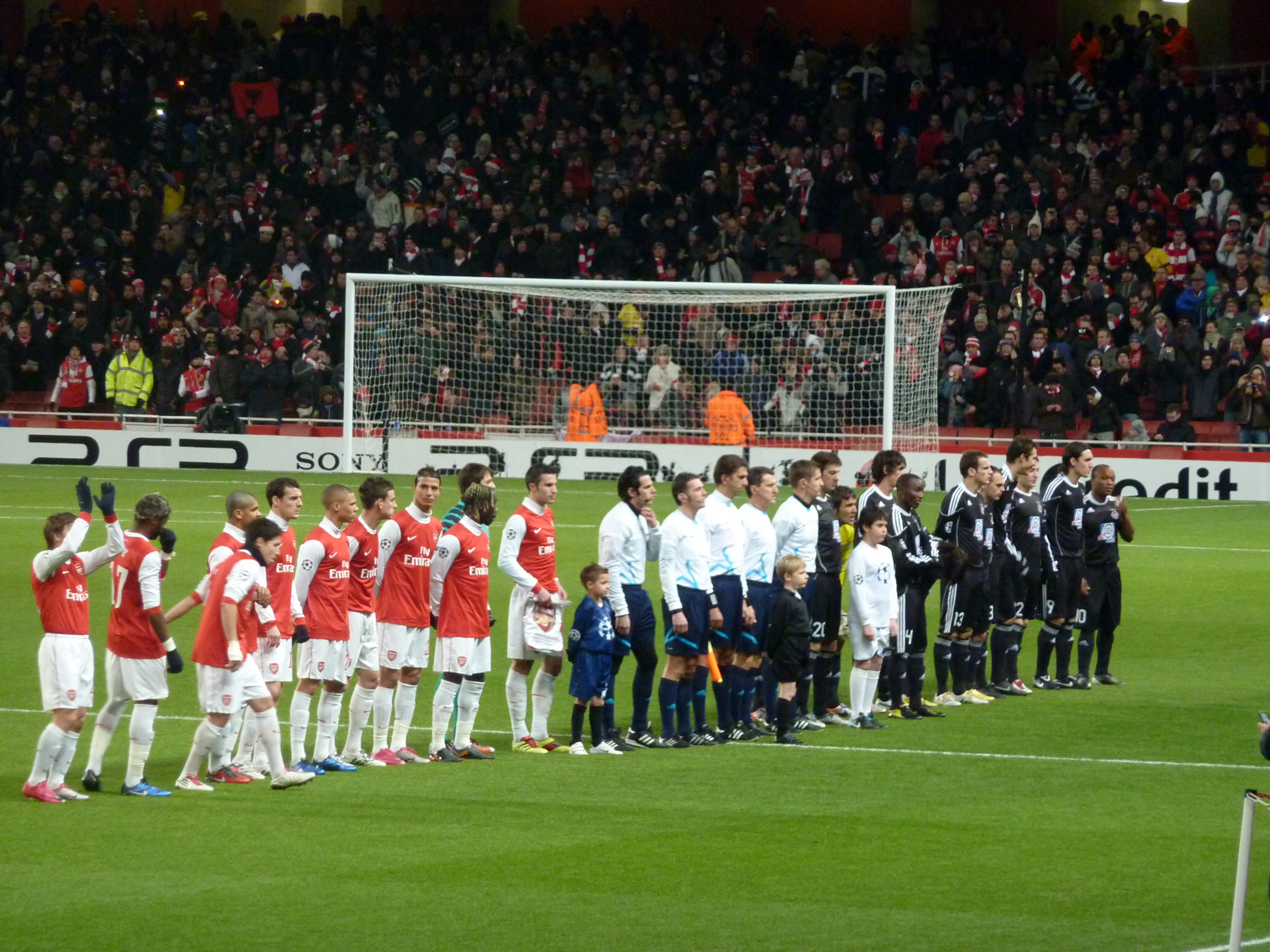
Arsenal London - Partizan Belgrade.

After Jokanović, the club decided to give a chance to the young coach and former Partizan footballer Aleksandar Stanojević. He became the youngest head coach in history of Partizan Belgrade. Stanojević took over the club in very difficult period and won the championship in 2010, although Partizan was 10 points behind from the 1st placed Red Star Belgrade. In the 2011, the club won the double. In UEFA competitions, Partizan qualified for the 2010–11 UEFA Champions League after beating RSC Anderlecht for the second time. At the Partizan Stadium the result was 2–2. In Brussels at the Constant Vanden Stock Stadium result was also 2–2. The key man was Cléo, who scored two goals against the Belgians. After penalty drama, Partizan reached again the UEFA Champions League group stage. Now, the draw for the group phase decided that Partizan will play in group H, alongside Arsenal London, Shakhtar Donetsk (the winner of the 2008–09 UEFA Cup) and S.C. Braga (the eventual runner-up of the 2010–11 UEFA Europa League). On the matchday 1, Partizan lost against Shakhtar on Donbas Arena in Donetsk (0–1). Next game Partizan played against Arsenal at Partizan Stadium and lost 1–3 after they played inspired football with a 10-man team in the last 30 minutes of the match. In two matches against Sporting Braga, Partizan failed to score and they lost both games (0–2 in Braga; 0–1 in Belgrade). The last two rounds in the group have also brought inspired football, but unfortunately it wasn't enough so Shakhtar Donetsk and The Gunners defeated Partizan once again, 0–3 in Belgrade and 1–3 at the Emirates Stadium.

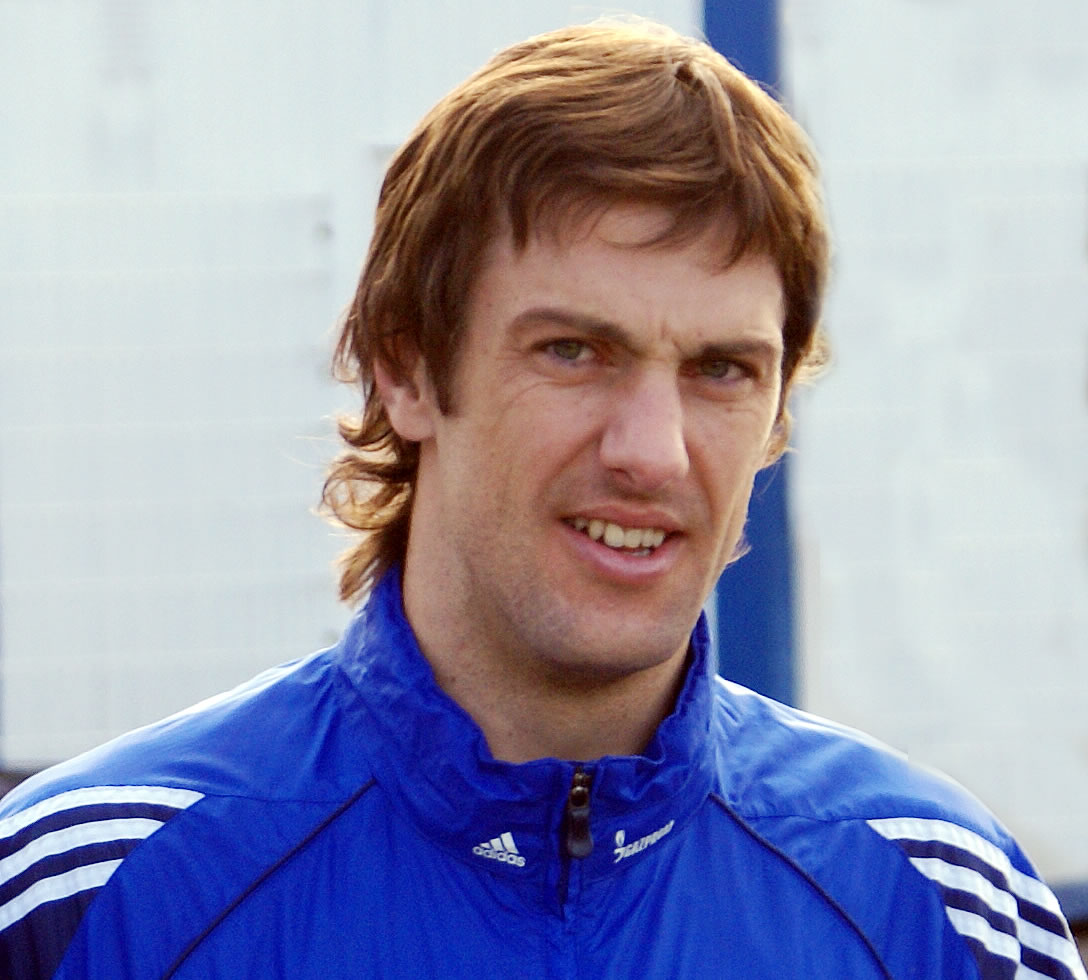
Defender Mladen Krstajić.

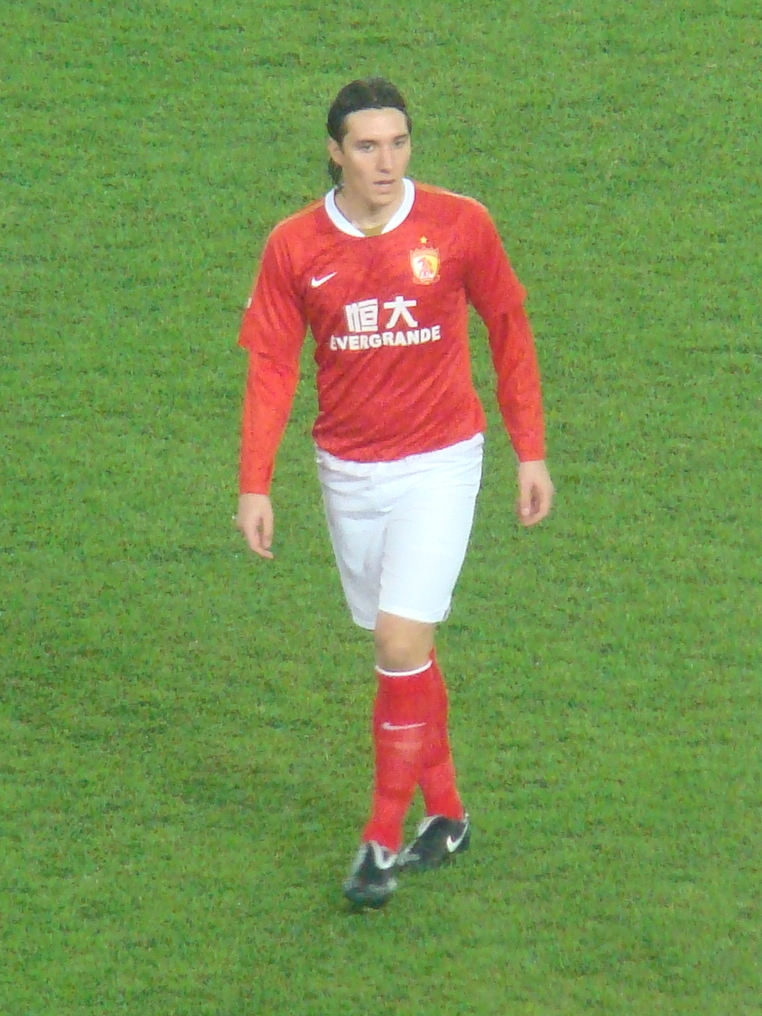
Brazilian player Cléo who introduced Partizan in the Champions League League in 2010 with his 3 goals in Play-off of the Champions League from 4 of Partizan

In the following season, the elimination during the 2012 Europa League qualifying stage, did not affect the club in national championship, but after the half-season, Stanojević was released. Partizan then signed former Chelsea manager Avram Grant, who was able to preserve the lead from the half-season. He led Partizan to their fifth consecutive league title but lost three times against fierce rivals Red Star. Grant resigned and former Partizan manager Vladimir Vermezović returned to Belgrade in May 2012. Partizan did not qualify for the 2012–13 UEFA Champions League, but did gain a place in the 2012-13 UEFA Europa League group stage. Because of poor results in the second part of national championship, Vermezović was dismissed and replaced by Vuk Rašović. Following the victory in the eternal derby and in pre-last round, Rašović secured a sixth consecutive title, a total of 25th in history of the club. As a champion of the Serbian SuperLiga for 2012–13 season, Partizan equalized a national record by the number of championship titles won.

Partizan's 2015–16 UEFA Champions League in second leg of Third qualifying round starting line-up that beat Steaua București 4–2 at home.

Partizan is after 1 year pause entered at the 2014–15 UEFA Europa League by beating Neftchi total score 5–3 (3–2 at home and 1–2 away). Partizan is after the draw, placed in Group C with Tottenham Hotspur, Beşiktaş and Asteras Tripolis. Popular "black and whites" began excellent the Europa League and remained undefeated against the English giant Tottenham, but in the next four games were defeated. 2014–15 season was a successful one for Partizan, winning the title of champion Serbia and passage to the group stage of the Europa League. Partizan in the summer transfer window in 2015 brought several signings with ambitions to qualify for the Champions League after 5 years. 2015–16 season for Partizan was begun on 14 July 2015 by defeating the Georgian team Dila Gori 1–0 in the second round of qualifying for the Champions League. Partizan also win in the second leg 0–2. In the third round Partizan got Steaua București. In first leg, Partizan has played a draw 1–1. In the second leg at the Partizan stadium, Partizan lost 1–2 at the half-time, and then the incredible return on goals Marko Jevtović, Andrija Živković and Nikola Trujić come to a positive result (4–2) and it get in the play-off the Champions League after 5 years. In the draw for the play–off for the Champions League, Partizan pulled BATE Borisov. In the first leg in Barysaw, Partizan played more than 45 minutes with a player less and lost 1–0. In the second match in Belgrade, Partizan won 2–1 but BATE qualify for the Champions League on away goals. After falling out of the play–off for the Champions League, Partizan has directly entered the Europa League. Partizan is after the draw, placed in Group L with Athletic Bilbao, AZ Alkmaar and Augsburg. On 17 September 2015, in the first match of the group stage of the Europa League, Partizan has played an excellent match against the Dutch club AZ Alkmaar and won 3–2 and it was also the first victory of the Partizan in the group stage of some a European competition since 16 December 2009 when the Partizan won against Shakhtar Donetsk 1–0 in Europa League group stage. On 1 October 2015, Partizan has won 1–3 against Augsburg on WWK ARENA with a player less in the second match of the group stage of the Europa League. In the next two matches against Athletic Bilbao, Partizan has lost twice (0–2 in Belgrade, 5–1 in Bilbao). On 26 November 2015, Partizan has made second win in the season against AZ Alkmaar at AFAS Stadion and made comebacks by Aboubakar Oumarou and Andrija Živković in 1–2 away win.

A few days after sixth double in club history, coach Nikolić left the club and signed with Hungarian club Videoton. A couple days after Nikolić's departure, Miroslav Đukić returned to Partizan. In second qualifying round for the UEFA Champions League, Partizan eliminated Budućnost Podgorica (2–0 on aggregate), but in third round they were eliminated by Olympiacos (3–5 on aggregate). In play-off round for 2017–18 UEFA Europa League, Partizan played against Videoton and ex coach Marko Nikolić. After 0–0 in Belgrade, Partizan destroyed Videoton 4–0 in Felcsút and reached the group stage. After that Partizan were drawn in UEFA europa League Group B alongside Dynamo Kyiv, Young Boys and Skënderbeu. Partizan drawn 1–1 with Young Boys in a first match of Group B.Partizan later played against Dynamo Kyiv. After leading 2–0 at half-time, they lost 3–2.Next two Partizan's matches were against Skënderbeu. In Korçë Partizan have drawn 0-0, and later win in Belgrade. Partizan then beat Young Boys at home, and secure place knock-out stage. In the last match of the group, Partizan lost 4–1 away to Dynamo in Kyiv. Partizan won second place in the group with eight points (two more than Young Boys and five less than Dynamo Kyiv). In the round of 32 Partizan played against Viktoria Plzeň. Partizan first played in Belgrade.Partizan takes the lead, but then concede a late goal which came from offside. Viktoria won 2–0 in Plzeň, and Partizan were eliminated from UEFA Europa League round of 32. The result was 3-1 for Viktoria on aggregate.

In 2018-19 Partizan experienced another turbulent season, both on and off the pitch. The club failed to reach the group stage of UEFA Europe League, after eliminating Rudar Pljevlja, Trakai and FC Nordsjaelland in the qualifiers, but suffering 1-4 (1-1, 0–3) aggregate defeat against Beşiktaş in the play-offs. After 3 managerial changes, Partizan appointed former star striker Savo Milošević as the club head coach on 27 March 2019. Milošević experienced a difficult start of his coaching career, but managed to consolidate the team, promote several excellent prospects from the youth academy, and lead Partizan to win the record, fourth consecutive Serbian Cup, after beating the arch-rivals Red Star at their stadium on 23 May 2019. Capo Verde international Ricardo Gomes finished the season with 26 goals under his belt, which made him the joint best foreign striker in club history.

Many players contributed to successes of the last twelve years, some of them are Mladen Krstajić, Saša Ilić, Ivica Iliev, Zvonimir Vukić, Igor Duljaj, Vladimir Ivić, Danko Lazović, Taribo West, Andrija Delibašić, Ivan Tomić, Simon Vukčević, Milan Smiljanić, Zoran Tošić, Stevan Jovetić, Ivan Obradović, Veljko Paunović, Nenad Đorđević, Radosav Petrović, Almami Moreira, Lamine Diarra, Cléo, Prince Tagoe, Stefan Savić, Adem Ljajić, Vladimir Stojković, Nemanja Tomić, Mohamed Kamara, Ivan Ivanov, Miloš Jojić, Lazar Marković, Aleksandar Mitrović and many more.
