= 1965–66 FK Partizan season =

Partizan
1965–66 season
- President: Vladimir Dujić
- Head coach: Abdulah Gegić
- Yugoslav First League: 11th
- Yugoslav Cup: Round of 16
- European Cup: Runners-up
- Top goalscorer: League: All: Mustafa Hasanagić
Home colours

The 1965–66 season was the 20th season in FK Partizan's existence. This article shows player statistics and matches that the club played during the 1965–66 season.

== Players ==
=== Squad information ===
Note: Flags indicate national team as defined under FIFA eligibility rules; some limited exceptions apply. Players may hold more than one non-FIFA nationality.

No.	Pos.	Nation	Player
—	GK	YUG	Milutin Šoškić (Captain)
—	GK	YUG	Ivan Ćurković
—	DF	YUG	Branko Rašović
—	DF	YUG	Ljubomir Mihajlović
—	DF	YUG	Milan Damjanović
—	DF	YUG	Velibor Vasović
—	DF	YUG	Fahrudin Jusufi
—	MF	YUG	Radoslav Bečejac
—	MF	YUG	Mane Bajić

No.	Pos.	Nation	Player
—	MF	YUG	Zoran Miladinović
—	MF	YUG	Milan Vukelić
—	MF	YUG	Dimitri Davidovic
—	FW	YUG	Milan Galić
—	FW	YUG	Vladica Kovačević
—	FW	YUG	Josip Pirmajer
—	FW	YUG	Mustafa Hasanagić
—	FW	YUG	Joakim Vislavski

== Friendlies ==
24 July 1965 Friendly	Hamburger SV (West Germany)	0–1	(Socialist Federal Republic of Yugoslavia) Partizan	Hamburg, West Germany
			Kovačević 9'	Attendance: 20,000

30 July 1965 Friendly	1. FC Köln (West Germany)	3–3	(Socialist Federal Republic of Yugoslavia) Partizan	Cologne, West Germany

3 August 1965 Friendly	Fortuna Sittard (Netherlands)	1–1	(Socialist Federal Republic of Yugoslavia) Partizan	Sittard-Geleen, Netherlands
			Vasović 83'	Attendance: 7,000

5 August 1965 Friendly	Gent (Belgium)	3–6	(Socialist Federal Republic of Yugoslavia) Partizan	Ghent, Belgium
			Bečejac 25'; Hasanagić 41'; Kovačević 42'; Bajić 65'; Mihajlović 75', 79'	Attendance: 5,000

7 August 1965 Friendly	Stuttgart (West Germany)	1–2	(Socialist Federal Republic of Yugoslavia) Partizan	Stuttgart, West Germany
			Milutinović 25'; Pirmajer 55'	Attendance: 12,000

22 August 1965 Friendly	Internazionale (Italy)	1–1	(Socialist Federal Republic of Yugoslavia) Partizan	Milan, Italy
			Vasović 15'

28 August 1965 Friendly	Partizan (Socialist Federal Republic of Yugoslavia)	4–1	(Belgium) Anderlecht	Casablanca, Morocco
	Hasanagić; Galić

29 August 1965 Friendly	Partizan (Socialist Federal Republic of Yugoslavia)	0–5	(Spain) Atlético Madrid	Casablanca, Morocco

8 September 1965 Friendly	Partizan (Socialist Federal Republic of Yugoslavia)	2–1	(Socialist Federal Republic of Yugoslavia) Crvena zvezda	Belgrade
	Kovačević 12'; Hasanagić 45'		Milićević 24'	Stadium: JNA Stadium; Attendance: 50,000; Referee: Zečević

3 October 1965 Friendly	Smederevo (Socialist Federal Republic of Yugoslavia)	1–5	(Socialist Federal Republic of Yugoslavia) Partizan	Smederevo

5 October 1965 Friendly	Borac Čačak (Socialist Federal Republic of Yugoslavia)	2–2	(Socialist Federal Republic of Yugoslavia) Partizan	Čačak

7 October 1965 Friendly	Dinamo Pančevo (Socialist Federal Republic of Yugoslavia)	3–4	(Socialist Federal Republic of Yugoslavia) Partizan	Pančevo

26 December 1965 Friendly	Vojvodina (Socialist Federal Republic of Yugoslavia)	2–2	(Socialist Federal Republic of Yugoslavia) Partizan	Novi Sad
			Vasović 6', 21'	Stadium: Karađorđe Stadium; Attendance: 8,000; Referee: Ilić

6 February 1966 Friendly	Radnički Kragujevac (Socialist Federal Republic of Yugoslavia)	2–6	(Socialist Federal Republic of Yugoslavia) Partizan	Kragujevac

9 February 1966 Friendly	Partizan (Socialist Federal Republic of Yugoslavia)	4–0	(Socialist Federal Republic of Yugoslavia) Voždovački	Belgrade

13 February 1966 Friendly	Velež (Socialist Federal Republic of Yugoslavia)	1–3	(Socialist Federal Republic of Yugoslavia) Partizan	Mostar
			Vasović; Hasanagić

15 February 1966 Friendly	Zmaj (Socialist Federal Republic of Yugoslavia)	2–4	(Socialist Federal Republic of Yugoslavia) Partizan	Makarska
				Attendance: 500

17 February 1966 Friendly	Neretva (Socialist Federal Republic of Yugoslavia)	0–8	(Socialist Federal Republic of Yugoslavia) Partizan	Metković
			Hasanagić; Vasović; Bečejac	Attendance: 2,000; Referee: Bojčić

19 February 1966 Friendly	Šibenik (Socialist Federal Republic of Yugoslavia)	2–2	(Socialist Federal Republic of Yugoslavia) Partizan	Šibenik
			Hasanagić 16'; Kovačević 90'	Stadium: Stadion Rade Končara; Attendance: 4,000; Referee: Bašić

24 February 1966 Friendly	Partizan (Socialist Federal Republic of Yugoslavia)	1–0	(Socialist Federal Republic of Yugoslavia) Vojvodina	Belgrade
	Hasanagić 15'			Stadium: JNA Stadium; Attendance: 15,000

== Competitions ==
=== Yugoslav First League ===
Pos	Team	Pld	W	D	L	GF	GA	GD	Pts
9	Sarajevo	30	10	9	11	40	44	−4	29
10	Vardar	30	12	4	14	47	44	+3	28
11	Partizan	30	10	8	12	45	47	−2	28
12	Željezničar (Note: Željezničar were docked 6 points due to Planinić Affair.)	30	12	8	10	35	36	−1	26
13	Hajduk Split (Note: Hajduk Split were docked 5 points due to Planinić Affair.)	30	11	8	11	45	37	+8	25

Source: rsssf.org
Rules for classification: 1) points; 2) goal difference; 3) number of goals scored.
Notes:

15 August 1965 1	Sarajevo	1–3	Partizan	Sarajevo
			Kovačević 45' (pen.); Hasanagić 51'; Bečejac 89'	Attendance: 20,000

21 August 1965 2	Partizan	1–1	Trešnjevka	Belgrade
	Hasanagić 28'			Stadium: JNA Stadium; Attendance: 12,000

25 August 1965 3	Zagreb	2–1	Partizan	Zagreb
			Milutinović 40'	Attendance: 15,000

11 September 1965 4	Partizan	3–1	Rijeka	Belgrade
	Bečejac 38'; Vukelić 41'; Galić 81'			Stadium: JNA Stadium; Attendance: 15,000

26 September 1965 5	Radnički Beograd	1–1	Partizan	Belgrade
			Vasović 81'	Attendance: 15,000

17 October 1965 6	Partizan	2–3	Vojvodina	Belgrade
	Hasanagić 57'; Vasović 67'		Takač 53'; Lambi 62'; Nikolić 70'	Stadium: JNA Stadium; Attendance: 20,000; Referee: Kostovski

20 October 1965 7	Dinamo Zagreb	1–1	Partizan	Zagreb
			Vislavski 36'	Attendance: 25,000

24 October 1965 8	Velež Mostar	0–0	Partizan	Mostar
				Attendance: 8,000

31 October 1965 9	Partizan	2–0	Željezničar	Belgrade
	Hasanagić 32'; Vislavski 57'			Stadium: JNA Stadium; Attendance: 18,000

14 November 1965 10	Hajduk Split	4–2	Partizan	Split
			Bajić 19', 43'	Attendance: 20,000

21 November 1965 11	Partizan	2–0	Radnički Niš	Belgrade
	Hasanagić 10', 34'			Stadium: JNA Stadium; Attendance: 15,000

28 November 1965 12	OFK Beograd	4–5	Partizan	Belgrade
			Pirmajer 24'; Hasanagić 33', 80'; Kovačević 39', 54' (pen.)	Attendance: 10,000

5 December 1965 13	Partizan	1–2	Crvena zvezda	Belgrade
	Pirmajer 69'		Milošević 12'; Džajić 58'	Stadium: Stadion JNA; Attendance: 55,000; Referee: Stanković

12 December 1965 14	Olimpija Ljubljana	3–0	Partizan	Ljubljana
				Attendance: 15,000

19 December 1965 15	Partizan	5–4	Vardar	Belgrade
	Bajić 3'; Hasanagić 8', 45'; Vasović 33'; Vislavski 48'			Stadium: JNA Stadium; Attendance: 12,000

5 March 1966 16	Partizan	1–0	Sarajevo	Belgrade
	Bečejac 61'			Stadium: JNA Stadium; Attendance: 8,000

13 March 1966 17	Trešnjevka	3–0	Partizan	Zagreb
				Attendance: 15,000

20 March 1966 18	Partizan	3–0	Zagreb	Belgrade
	Vukelić 20', 86' (pen.); Pirmajer 81'			Stadium: JNA Stadium; Attendance: 10,000

27 March 1966 19	Rijeka	0–1	Partizan	Rijeka
			Bečejac 30'	Attendance: 12,000

2 April 1966 20	Partizan	1–1	Radnički Beograd	Belgrade
	Bečejac 76'			Stadium: JNA Stadium; Attendance: 8,000

9 April 1966 21	Partizan	2–0	Dinamo Zagreb	Belgrade
	Petrović 56', 83'			Stadium: JNA Stadium; Attendance: 12,000

16 April 1966 22	Vojvodina	1–0	Partizan	Novi Sad
	Takač 4'			Attendance: 15,000

24 April 1966 23	Partizan	2–3	Velež Mostar	Belgrade
	Vasović 29'; Petrović 61'			Stadium: JNA Stadium; Attendance: 15,000

1 May 1966 24	Željezničar	3–1	Partizan	Sarajevo
			Pirmajer 11'	Attendance: 25,000

15 May 1966 25	Partizan	1–1	Hajduk Split	Belgrade
	Hasanagić 36'		Ivković 19'	Attendance: 10,000

22 May 1966 26	Radnički Niš	0–0	Partizan	Niš
				Stadium: Čair Stadium; Attendance: 25,000

28 May 1966 27	Partizan	0–2	OFK Beograd	Belgrade
				Attendance: 8,000

5 June 1966 28	Crvena zvezda	2–1	Partizan	Belgrade
	Kostić 43', 84'		Bečejac 37'	Stadium: Marakana; Attendance: 50,000; Referee: Bajić

12 June 1966 29	Partizan	1–2	Olimpija Ljubljana	Belgrade
	Hasanagić 83'			Attendance: 6,000

18 June 1966 30	Vardar	2–2	Partizan	Skopje
			Hasanagić 50', 62'	Attendance: 10,000

=== Yugoslav Cup ===
27 October 1965 Round of 32	Borac Čačak	0–4	Partizan	Čačak
			Hasanagić 12', 25'; Vasović 73'; Kovačević 80'	Attendance: 5,000

27 February 1966 Round of 16	Rijeka	3–1	Partizan	Rijeka
			Kovačević 40' (pen.)	Attendance: 7,000

=== European Cup ===
==== Preliminary round ====
22 September 1965 Preliminary round 1st leg	Partizan (Socialist Federal Republic of Yugoslavia)	2–0	(France) Nantes	Belgrade, Yugoslavia
	Galić 37'; Hasanagić 48'	Report		Stadium: JNA Stadium; Attendance: 20,464; Referee: Francesco Francescon (Italy)

13 October 1965 Preliminary round 2nd leg	Nantes (France)	2–2 (2 – 4 agg.)	(Socialist Federal Republic of Yugoslavia) Partizan	Nantes, France
	Magny 32'; Blanchet 70'	Report	Kovačević 43' (pen.); Galić 47'	Stadium: Stade Marcel Saupin; Attendance: 16,007; Referee: Gaspar Pintado Viu (Spain)

==== First round ====
9 November 1965 First round 1st leg	Partizan (Socialist Federal Republic of Yugoslavia)	3–0	(West Germany) Werder Bremen	Belgrade, Yugoslavia
	Jusufi 70'; Hasanagić 75'; Pirmajer 89'	Report		Stadium: JNA Stadium; Attendance: 24,203; Referee: Bruno de Marchi (Italy)

17 November 1965 First round 2nd leg	Werder Bremen (West Germany)	1–0 (1 – 3 agg.)	(Socialist Federal Republic of Yugoslavia) Partizan	Bremen, West Germany
	Schütz 32'	Report		Stadium: Weserstadion; Attendance: 28,478; Referee: Thomas Wharton (Scotland)

==== Quarter-finals ====
2 March 1966 Quarter-finals 1st leg	Sparta Prague (Czechoslovakia)	4–1	(Socialist Federal Republic of Yugoslavia) Partizan	Prague, Czechoslovakia
	Kvašňák 20', 54' (pen.), 86'; Mašek 73'	Report	Hasanagić 16'	Stadium: Letná Stadium; Attendance: 30,214; Referee: Gyula Emsberger (Hungary)

9 March 1966 Quarter-finals 2nd leg	Partizan (Socialist Federal Republic of Yugoslavia)	5–0 (6 – 4 agg.)	(Czechoslovakia) Sparta Prague	Belgrade, Yugoslavia
	Kovačević 4', 29'; Vasović 23'; Hasanagić 35', 41'	Report		Stadium: JNA Stadium; Attendance: 50,000; Referee: Dimitar Rumentschev (Bulgaria)

==== Semi-finals ====
13 April 1966 Semi-finals 1st leg	Partizan (Socialist Federal Republic of Yugoslavia)	2–0	(England) Manchester United	Belgrade, Yugoslavia
	Hasanagić 46'; Bečejac 59'	Report		Stadium: JNA Stadium; Attendance: 60,000; Referee: Kurt Waldemar Tschenscher (West Germany)

20 April 1966 Semi-finals 2nd leg	Manchester United (England)	1–0 (1 – 2 agg.)	(Socialist Federal Republic of Yugoslavia) Partizan	Manchester, England
	Stiles 72'	Report		Stadium: Old Trafford; Attendance: 61,475; Referee: Gottfried Dienst (Switzerland)

==== Final ====
11 May 1966
19:30 CET

Real Madrid (Spain)	2–1	(Socialist Federal Republic of Yugoslavia) Partizan
Amancio 70'; Serena 76'	Report	Vasović 55'

Heysel Stadium, Brussels
Attendance: 46,745
Referee: Rudolf Kreitlein (West Germany)

Real Madrid	Partizan

GK	1	(Spain) José Araquistáin
RB	2	(Spain) Pachín
LB	3	(Spain) Manuel Sanchís Martínez
RM	4	(Spain) Pirri
CB	5	(Spain) Pedro de Felipe
CB	6	(Spain) Ignacio Zoco
RF	7	(Spain) Fernando Serena
CF	8	(Spain) Amancio Amaro
CF	9	(Spain) Ramón Grosso
LM	10	(Spain) Manuel Velázquez
LF	11	(Spain) Francisco Gento (c)
Manager:
(Spain) Miguel Muñoz

GK	1	(Socialist Federal Republic of Yugoslavia) Milutin Šoškić (c)
RB	2	(Socialist Federal Republic of Yugoslavia) Fahrudin Jusufi
LB	3	(Socialist Federal Republic of Yugoslavia) Ljubomir Mihajlović
CM	4	(Socialist Federal Republic of Yugoslavia) Radoslav Bečejac
CB	5	(Socialist Federal Republic of Yugoslavia) Velibor Vasović
CB	6	(Socialist Federal Republic of Yugoslavia) Branko Rašović
RF	7	(Socialist Federal Republic of Yugoslavia) Mane Bajić
CM	8	(Socialist Federal Republic of Yugoslavia) Vladica Kovačević
CF	9	(Socialist Federal Republic of Yugoslavia) Mustafa Hasanagić
CF	10	(Socialist Federal Republic of Yugoslavia) Milan Galić
LF	11	(Socialist Federal Republic of Yugoslavia) Josip Pirmajer
Manager:
(Socialist Federal Republic of Yugoslavia) Abdulah Gegić

== Statistics ==
=== Goalscorers ===
This includes all competitive matches.

Rank	Pos	Nat	Name	Yugoslav First League	Yugoslav Cup	European Cup	Total
1	FW	(Socialist Federal Republic of Yugoslavia)	Mustafa Hasanagić	12	2	6	20
2	MF	(Socialist Federal Republic of Yugoslavia)	Vladica Kovačević	3	2	3	8
3	DF	(Socialist Federal Republic of Yugoslavia)	Velibor Vasović	4	1	2	7
4	MF	(Socialist Federal Republic of Yugoslavia)	Radoslav Bečejac	6	0	1	7
5	MF	(Socialist Federal Republic of Yugoslavia)	Josip Pirmajer	4	0	1	5
6	MF	(Socialist Federal Republic of Yugoslavia)	Miodrag Petrović	4	0	0	4
7	FW	(Socialist Federal Republic of Yugoslavia)	Milan Galić	1	0	2	3
7	MF	(Socialist Federal Republic of Yugoslavia)	Milan Vukelić	3	0	0	3
7	FW	(Socialist Federal Republic of Yugoslavia)	Joakim Vislavski	3	0	0	3
7	MF	(Socialist Federal Republic of Yugoslavia)	Mane Bajić	3	0	0	3
11	DF	(Socialist Federal Republic of Yugoslavia)	Fahrudin Jusufi	0	0	1	1
11	FW	(Socialist Federal Republic of Yugoslavia)	Petar Mrđa	1	0	0	1
11	MF	(Socialist Federal Republic of Yugoslavia)	Bora Milutinović	1	0	0	1
TOTALS				45	5	16	66

=== Score overview ===
Win Draw Loss

Opposition	Home score	Away score	Aggregate
Vojvodina	2–3	0–1	2–4
Dinamo Zagreb	2–0	1–1	3–1
Velež Mostar	2–3	0–0	2–3
Rijeka	3–1	1–0	4–1
Crvena zvezda	1–2	1–2	2–4
OFK Beograd	0–2	5–4	5–6
Radnički Niš	2–0	0–0	2–0
Olimpija	1–2	0–3	1–5
Sarajevo	1–0	3–1	4–1
Vardar	5–4	2–2	7–6
Željezničar	2–0	1–3	3–3
Hajduk Split	1–1	2–4	3–5
Zagreb	3–0	1–2	4–2
Radnički Beograd	1–1	1–1	2–2
Trešnjevka	1–1	0–3	1–4

== See also ==
- List of FK Partizan seasons
