= 1965–66 Real Madrid CF season =

63rd season in existence of Real Madrid CF

Real Madrid CF
1965–66 season
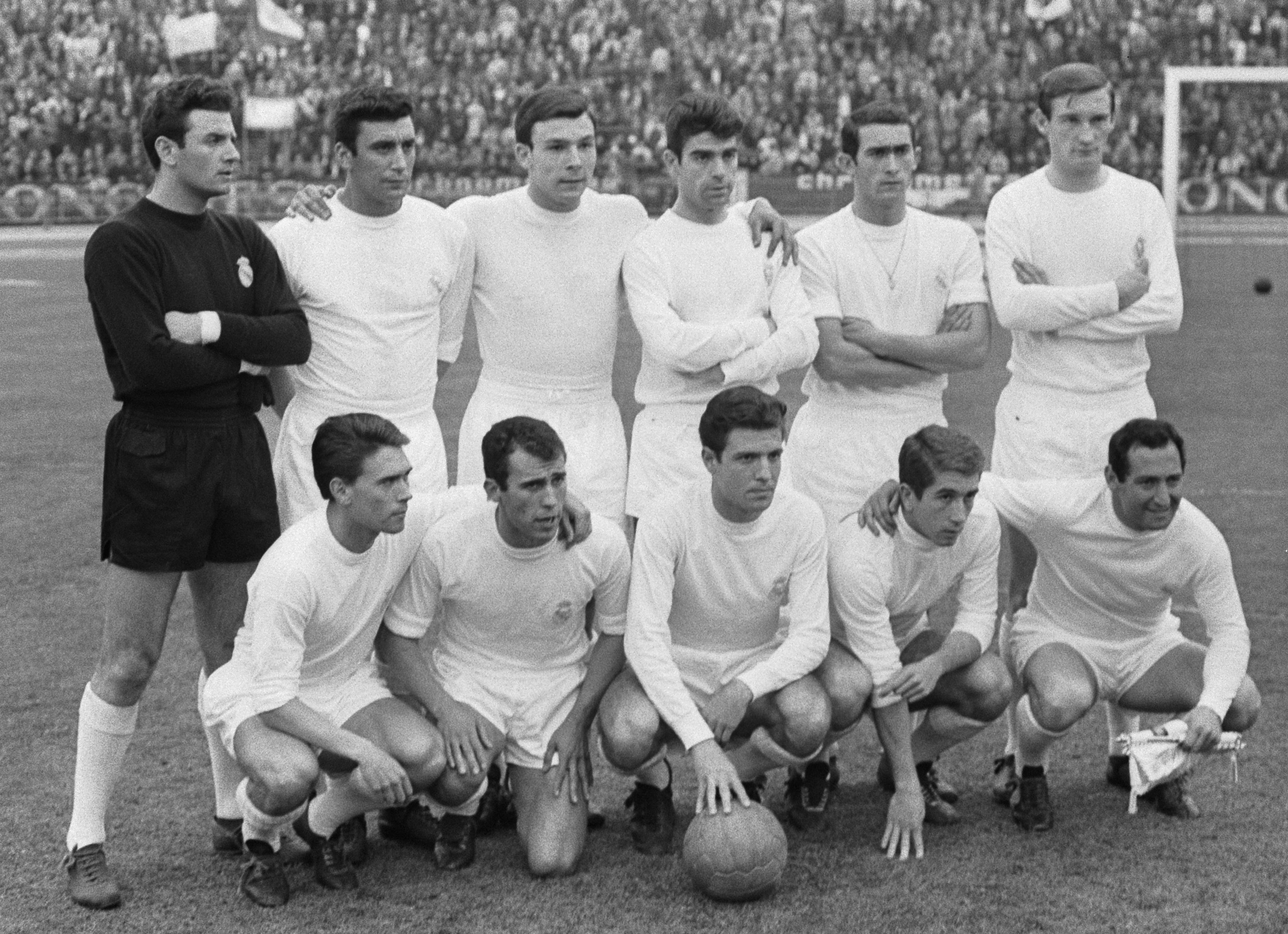
- Real Madrid line-up in the 1966 European Cup Final against FK Partizan
- President: Santiago Bernabéu
- Head coach: Miguel Muñoz
- Stadium: Chamartín
- La Liga: 2nd
- Copa del Generalísimo: Quarter-finals
- European Cup: Winners (in European Cup)
- Top goalscorer: Ramón Grosso (11)
| Home colours | Away colours |

The 1965–66 season was Real Madrid Club de Fútbol's 63rd season in existence and the club's 34th consecutive season in the top flight of Spanish football.

== Summary ==
The club remained at first place almost the entire campaign before was defeated 1–2 by CF Barcelona and lost the title against local rivals Atlético Madrid one round before season finale by just one single point. UD Levante defender Antonio Calpe arrived to enforce the back-up, also, CD Málaga midfielder Manuel Velázquez returned from a two years loan replacing French playmaker Lucien Muller, also, transferred in was defender Pedro de Felipe from Rayo Vallecano benching José Santamaría both arrivals featured a superb season.

Meanwhile, in European Cup the squad clinched its sixth trophy after defeated Inter in Semi-finals and on 11 May 1966 won 2–1 the Final against Abdulah Gegic' Partizan Belgrade which, previously, in semi-finals eliminated heavily favourites Manchester United without star George Best. Three days after the Final, the Yé-yé team was introduced to the world after 4 players posed for Diario Marca as then popular English rock band The Beatles resulting in the nickname from their theme song <<She Loves You>> chorus hit "Yeah-yeah".

In the Copa del Generalísimo, Madrid was eliminated by Real Betis in the quarter-finals 5–4 on aggregate. After seven seasons, 5 League titles and 3 European Cup trophies, Hungarian forward Ferenc Puskás left the club during the summer.

== Squad ==
Note: Flags indicate national team as defined under FIFA eligibility rules; some limited exceptions apply. Players may hold more than one non-FIFA nationality.

| No. | Pos. | Nation | Player |
|---|---|---|---|
| — | GK | ESP | Antonio Betancort |
| — | GK | ESP | José Araquistáin |
| — | DF | ESP | Ignacio Zoco |
| — | DF | ESP | Manuel Sanchís |
| — | DF | ESP | Pedro de Felipe |
| — | DF | ESP | Vicente Miera |
| — | DF | URU | José Santamaría |
| — | DF | ESP | Pachín |
| — | DF | ESP | Antonio Calpe |
| — | DF | ESP | Pedro Casado |
| — | MF | ESP | Pirri |
| — | MF | ESP | Manuel Velázquez |
| — | MF | ESP | Félix Ruiz |

| No. | Pos. | Nation | Player |
|---|---|---|---|
| — | MF | ESP | Fernando Serena |
| — | MF | ESP | Ramón Tejada |
| — | MF | ESP | Pipi Suárez |
| — | FW | ESP | Ramón Grosso |
| — | FW | ESP | Francisco Gento |
| — | FW | ESP | Amancio Amaro |
| — | FW | HUN | Ferenc Puskás |
| — | FW | ESP | José Luis Veloso |
| — | FW | PAR | Juan Bautista Agüero |
| — | FW | ESP | Manuel Bueno |
| — | FW | ESP | Emilio Morollón |
| — | FW | BEL | Fernand Goyvaerts |
| — | FW | ESP | Jaime Blanco |
| — | FW | ESP | Fernando García-Ramos |

=== Transfers ===
In
| Pos. | Name | From | Type |
|---|---|---|---|
| MF | Manuel Velázquez | CD Malaga | - |
| GK | Mendieta | Indauchu | - |
| FW | José Luis Veloso | Deportivo | - |
| DF | Antonio Calpe | Levante | - |
| MF | Ramón Tejada | Cordoba | - |
| FW | Juan Aguero | Sevilla | - |
| FW | Fernand Goyvaerts | FC Barcelona | - |
| FW | Jaime Blanco | Deportivo | - |
| FW | Garcia Ramos | - | - |

Out
| Pos. | Name | To | Type |
|---|---|---|---|
| MF | Lucien Muller | FC Barcelona | - |
| GK | Beltran | Rayo Vallecano | - |
| MF | Felo | Sevilla | - |
| MF | Santos | Deportivo | - |
| FW | Evaristo | - | - |
| MF | Yanko | Melilla CF | - |
| DF | Isidro | Sabadell | - |
| FW | Morollon | Sabadell | - |
| MF | Pipi Suarez | Sevilla | - |

== Competitions ==
=== La Liga ===
==== League table ====
| Pos | Team | Pld | W | D | L | GF | GA | GD | Pts | Qualification or relegation |
|---|---|---|---|---|---|---|---|---|---|---|
| 1 | Atlético Madrid (C) | 30 | 18 | 8 | 4 | 54 | 20 | +34 | 44 | Qualification for the European Cup first round |
| 2 | Real Madrid | 30 | 19 | 5 | 6 | 53 | 30 | +23 | 43 | Qualification for the European Cup second round (Note: Real Madrid qualified for the European Cup as title holders.) |
| 3 | Barcelona | 30 | 16 | 6 | 8 | 51 | 27 | +24 | 38 | Invited for the Inter-Cities Fairs Cup |
| 4 | Zaragoza | 30 | 14 | 8 | 8 | 47 | 29 | +18 | 36 | Qualification for the Cup Winners' Cup first round (Note: Zaragoza qualified to the Cup Winners' Cup as champions of the Copa del Generalísimo.) |
| 5 | Atlético Bilbao | 30 | 14 | 6 | 10 | 43 | 32 | +11 | 34 | Invited for the Inter-Cities Fairs Cup |

Source: BDFútbol
Rules for classification: 1) Points; 2) Head-to-head results; 3) Goal difference; 4) Number of goals scored
(C) Champions

==== Position by round ====
| Round | 1 | 2 | 3 | 4 | 5 | 6 | 7 | 8 | 9 | 10 | 11 | 12 | 13 | 14 | 15 | 16 | 17 | 18 | 19 | 20 | 21 | 22 | 23 | 24 | 25 | 26 | 27 | 28 | 29 | 30 |
|---|---|---|---|---|---|---|---|---|---|---|---|---|---|---|---|---|---|---|---|---|---|---|---|---|---|---|---|---|---|---|
| Ground | H | A | H | A | H | A | H | A | H | A | H | A | H | H | A | A | H | A | H | A | H | A | H | A | H | A | H | A | A | H |
| Result | W | W | W | L | W | D | D | W | W | L | W | L | W | L | W | D | W | W | W | W | W | D | W | L | W | D | W | W | L | W |
| Position | 4 | 2 | 2 | 3 | 2 | 4 | 3 | 3 | 2 | 4 | 4 | 4 | 4 | 4 | 4 | 3 | 2 | 2 | 2 | 2 | 1 | 1 | 1 | 1 | 1 | 1 | 1 | 1 | 2 | 2 |

Source: www.lfp.es
A = Away; H = Home; W = Win; D = Draw; L = Loss; = Leader, 1966-67 European Cup

==== Matches ====
| 4 September 1965 1 | Real Madrid | 1–0 | CE Sabadell FC | Madrid |
| | Pirri 51' | Report | | Stadium: Chamartín; Referee: Cerezuela Ruiz |

| 12 September 1965 2 | Real Betis | 1–2 | Real Madrid | Madrid |
| | Ansola 39' | Report | Grosso 51'; Gento 86' | Stadium: Chamartín; Referee: López Zaballa |

| 18 September 1965 3 | Real Madrid | 1–0 | Pontevedra CF | Madrid |
| | Puskás 73' | Report | | Stadium: Chamartín; Referee: De la Teja Ocejo |

| 26 September 1965 4 | Valencia CF | 3–0 | Real Madrid | Valencia |
| | Sánchez Lage 13' (pen.); Guillot 56'; Waldo 76' | Report | | Stadium: Mestalla; Referee: Bueno Perales |

| 3 October 1965 5 | Real Madrid | 2–1 | Córdoba CF | Madrid |
| | Amancio 7'; Puskás 72' | Report | Jara 68' | Stadium: Chamartín; Referee: Rigo Sureda |

| 10 October 1965 6 | Atlético Madrid | 1–1 | Real Madrid | Madrid |
| | Adelardo 18' | Report | Gento 11' | Stadium: Metropolitano; Referee: Zariquiegui Izco |

| 17 October 1965 7 | Real Madrid | 0–0 | Español | Madrid |
| | | Report | | Stadium: Chamartín; Referee: Martín Álvarez |

| 31 October 1965 8 | Real Zaragoza | 2–3 | Real Madrid | Zaragoza |
| | Lapetra 38'; Marcelino 40' | Report | Grosso 69'; Bueno 75'; Puskás 80' | Stadium: Estadio La Romareda; Referee: López Zaballa |

| 13 November 1965 9 | Real Madrid | 2–1 | Elche CF | Madrid |
| | Amancio 45'; Pirri 87' | Report | Betancort 50' (own goal); Canós (red card) 58'; Marcial (red card) 86' | Stadium: Chamartín; Referee: Oliva Fortuny |

| 21 November 1965 10 | Sevilla CF | 2–1 | Real Madrid | Sevilla |
| | Pintado 7'; Lax 72' | Report | Puskás 12' | Stadium: Estadio Sanchez Pizjuan; Referee: Pintado Viu |

| 27 November 1965 11 | Real Madrid | 1–0 | CD Málaga | Madrid |
| | Zoco 60' | Report | | Stadium: Chamartín; Referee: Ibáñez Alarcón |

| 5 December 1965 12 | Athletic Bilbao | 2–0 | Real Madrid | Bilbao |
| | Uriarte 17'; Ormaza 43' | Report | | Stadium: San Mames; Referee: Álvarez Martínez |

| 12 December 1965 13 | Real Madrid | 3–1 | UD Las Palmas | Madrid |
| | Gento 10'; Agüero 22'; Gento 67' (pen.) | Report | Miera 89' (own goal) | Stadium: Chamartín; Referee: Rigo Sureda |

| 19 December 1965 14 | Real Madrid | 1–3 | CF Barcelona | Madrid |
| | Felix Ruiz 20' | Report | Fusté 7', 8'; Zaldúa 34' | Stadium: Chamartín; Referee: Lopez Zaballa |

| 26 December 1965 15 | Mallorca | 2–5 | Real Madrid | Palma de Mallorca |
| | Bergara 30'; Bergara 63' | Report | Amancio 10'; Velázquez 11'; Serena 44'; Grosso 79'; Velázquez 85' | Stadium: Lluís Sitjar; Referee: Cerezuela Ruiz |

| 2 January 1966 16 | CE Sabadell FC | 1–1 | Real Madrid | Sabadell |
| | Noya 46' | Report | Grosso 34' | Stadium: Creu Alta; Referee: Ortiz de Mendibil |

| 6 January 1966 17 | Real Madrid | 2–0 | Real Betis | Madrid |
| | Gento 45' (pen.); Grosso 89' | | | Stadium: Chamartín; Referee: García Rodríguez |

| 9 January 1966 18 | Pontevedra CF | 1–3 | Real Madrid | Pontevedra |
| | Neme 72' | Report | Amancio 1'; Pirri 24'; Amancio 53' | Stadium: Pasarón; Referee: Rigo Sureda |

| 16 January 1966 19 | Real Madrid | 2–1 | Valencia CF | Madrid |
| | Pirri 18'; Grosso 32' | Report | Sánchez Lage 78' | Stadium: Chamartín; Referee: Zariquiegui Izco |

| 23 January 1966 20 | Córdoba CF | 1–2 | Real Madrid | Córdoba |
| | Jara 8' | Report | Grosso 14'; Velázquez 31' | Stadium: El Arcángel; Referee: Gómez Arribas |

| 30 January 1966 21 | Real Madrid | 3–1 | Atlético Madrid | Madrid |
| | Pirri 44'; Grosso 60'; Amancio 67' | Report | Ufarte 32' | Stadium: Chamartín; Referee: Ortiz de Mendibil |

| 6 February 1966 22 | Español | 1–1 | Real Madrid | Barcelona |
| | Boy 20' | Report | Pirri 75' | Stadium: Sarrià; Referee: Zariquiegui Izco |

| 13 February 1966 23 | Real Madrid | 2–0 | Real Zaragoza | Madrid |
| | Serena 8'; Amancio 61' | Report | | Stadium: Chamartín; Referee: Zariquiegui Izco |

| 20 February 1966 24 | Elche CF | 1–0 | Real Madrid | Elche |
| | Marcial 48' | Report | | Stadium: Campo de Altabix; Referee: Rigo Sureda |

| 27 February 1966 25 | Real Madrid | 4–0 | Sevilla CF | Madrid |
| | Gento 35'; Veloso 47'; Veloso 63'; Grosso 88' | Report | | Stadium: Chamartín; Referee: Ortiz de Mendibil |

| 6 March 1966 26 | CD Málaga | 0–0 | Real Madrid | Málaga |
| | | Report | | Stadium: Estadio La Rosaleda; Referee: Zariquiegui Izco |

| 13 March 1966 27 | Real Madrid | 2–0 | Athletic Bilbao | Madrid |
| | Gento 42' (pen.); Veloso 76' | Report | | Stadium: Chamartín; Referee: Ruiz Alciturri |

| 20 March 1966 28 | UD Las Palmas | 1–2 | Real Madrid | Las Palmas de Gran Canaria |
| | Juan Luis 73' | Report | Veloso 68'; Pirri 85' | Stadium: Estadio Insular; Referee: Gómez Arribas |

| 27 March 1966 29 | CF Barcelona | 2–1 | Real Madrid | Barcelona |
| | Rifé 59'; Zaballa 63' | Report | Gento 39' | Stadium: Estadio del CF Barcelona; Referee: Rigo Sureda |

| 3 April 1966 30 | Real Madrid | 5–1 | Mallorca | Madrid |
| | Gento 8'; Amancio 17'; Grosso 38'; Gento 51'; Grosso 89' | Report | Héctor Núñez 44' | Stadium: Chamartín; Referee: Ortiz de Mendibil |

=== Copa del Generalísimo ===
==== Round of 32 ====
| 10 April 1966 | Real Madrid | 2–0 | Real Gijón | Madrid |
| | | Report | | Stadium: Chamartín |

| 17 April 1966 | Real Gijón | 2–4 | Real Madrid | Gijón |
| | | Report | | Stadium: Estadio El Molinón |

==== Round of 16 ====
| 24 April 1966 | Real Madrid | 1–1 | CD Málaga | Madrid |
| | | Report | | Stadium: Chamartín |

| 1 May 1966 | CD Málaga | 1–1 | Real Madrid | Málaga |
| | | Report | | Stadium: Estadio La Rosaleda |

| 4 May 1966 Replay | Real Madrid | 2–0 | CD Málaga | Valencia |
| | Veloso 8'; Felix Ruiz 87' | Report | | Stadium: Estadio Mestalla |

==== Quarter-finals ====
| 8 May 1966 | Real Betis | 3–2 | Real Madrid | Sevilla |
| | Rogelio 6', 30'; Azcárate 57' | Report | Jaime Blanco 10'; Bueno 36' | Stadium: Estadio Benito Villamarin |

| 15 May 1966 | Real Madrid | 2–2 (a.e.t.) (4–5 agg.) | Real Betis | Madrid |
| | Gento 24'; Pirri 96' | Report | Landa 118', 149' | Stadium: Chamartín |

=== European Cup ===
==== Preliminary round ====
| 8 September 1965 | Feyenoord (Netherlands) | 2–1 | (Spain) Real Madrid | Rotterdam |
| | Venneker 78'; Kruiver 85' | Report | Puskás 35' | Stadium: Feijenoord Stadion; Attendance: 62,610; Referee: (Czech Republic) Karol Galba |

| 22 September 1965 | Real Madrid (Spain) | 5–0 | (Netherlands) Feyenoord | Madrid |
| | Puskás 10', 20', 29', 86'; Grosso 44' | Report | | Stadium: Santiago Bernabéu Stadium, Attendance: 53,239; Referee: Jack Taylor (England) |

==== Round of 16 ====
| 17 November 1965 | Kilmarnock (Scotland) | 2–2 | (Spain) Real Madrid | Kilmarnock |
| | McLean 22' (pen.); McInally 60' | Report | Pirri 25'; Amancio 55' | Stadium: Rugby Park; Attendance: 25,385; Referee: Gerhard Schulenburg (West Germany) |

| 1 December 1965 | Real Madrid (Spain) | 5–1 | (Scotland) Kilmarnock | Madrid |
| | Grosso 25', 36'; Ruiz 26'; Gento 58'; Pirri 90' | Report | McIlroy 22' | Stadium: Santiago Bernabéu Stadium, Attendance: 26,879; Referee: Giulio Campanati (Italy) |

==== Quarter-finals ====
| 23 February 1966 | Anderlecht (Belgium) | 1–0 | (Spain) Real Madrid | Brussels |
| | Van Himst 2' | Report | | Stadium: Émile Versé Stadium; Attendance: 34,862; Referee: (Scotland) Thomas Wharton |

| 9 March 1966 | Real Madrid (Spain) | 4–2 | (Belgium) Anderlecht | Madrid |
| | Amancio 12', 35'; Gento 58' (pen.), 83' | Report | Jurion 87'; Puis 90' | Stadium: Santiago Bernabéu Stadium; Attendance: 54,415; Referee: (France) Joseph Barbéran |

==== Semi-finals ====
| 13 April 1966 | Real Madrid (Spain) | 1–0 | (Italy) Internazionale | Madrid |
| | Pirri 12' | Report | | Stadium: Santiago Bernabéu Stadium; Attendance: 120,000; Referee: (Austria) Dimitris Wlachojanis |

| 20 April 1966 | Internazionale (Italy) | 1–1 | (Spain) Real Madrid | Milan |
| | Facchetti 78' | Report | Amancio 20' | Stadium: San Siro; Attendance: 75,991; Referee: (Hungary) György Vadász |

==== Final ====
| 11 May 1966 | Real Madrid (Spain) | 2–1 | (Socialist Federal Republic of Yugoslavia) FK Partizan | Brussels |
| | Amancio 70'; Serena 76' | Report | Vasović 55' | Stadium: Heysel Stadium; Attendance: 46,745; Referee: (West Germany) Rudolf Kreitlein |

== Statistics ==
=== Players statistics ===
| No. | Pos | Nat | Player | Total | | Primera Division | | Copa del Generalisimo | | European Cup | |
| No. | Pos | Nat | Player | Apps | Goals | Apps | Goals | Apps | Goals | Apps | Goals |
|---|---|---|---|---|---|---|---|---|---|---|---|
| | GK | (Spain) ESP | Betancort | 38 | -41 | 30 | -30 | 1 | -3 | 7 | -8 |
| | DF | (Spain) ESP | Miera | 26 | 0 | 17 | 0 | 5 | 0 | 4 | 0 |
| | DF | (Spain) ESP | Zoco | 42 | 1 | 30 | 1 | 3 | 0 | 9 | 0 |
| | DF | (Spain) ESP | De Felipe | 33 | 0 | 22 | 0 | 4 | 0 | 7 | 0 |
| | DF | (Spain) ESP | Sanchis | 37 | 0 | 27 | 0 | 1 | 0 | 9 | 0 |
| | MF | (Spain) ESP | Pirri | 41 | 12 | 28 | 7 | 4 | 1 | 9 | 4 |
| | MF | (Spain) ESP | Ruiz | 20 | 3 | 13 | 1 | 3 | 1 | 4 | 1 |
| | MF | (Spain) ESP | Velazquez | 22 | 3 | 15 | 3 | 2 | 0 | 5 | 0 |
| | FW | (Spain) ESP | Amancio | 33 | 13 | 25 | 8 | 1 | 0 | 7 | 5 |
| | FW | (Spain) ESP | Grosso | 38 | 15 | 29 | 11 | 1 | 1 | 8 | 3 |
| | FW | (Spain) ESP | Gento | 39 | 14 | 28 | 10 | 2 | 1 | 9 | 3 |
| | GK | (Spain) ESP | Araquistain | 7 | -7 | 0 | 0 | 5 | -5 | 2 | -2 |
| | MF | (Spain) ESP | Serena | 20 | 3 | 12 | 2 | 3 | 0 | 5 | 1 |
| | DF | (Uruguay) URU | Santamaria | 14 | 0 | 9 | 0 | 3 | 0 | 2 | 0 |
| | FW | (Hungary) HUN | Puskas | 14 | 10 | 8 | 4 | 3 | 1 | 3 | 5 |
| | DF | (Spain) ESP | Pachín | 18 | 0 | 8 | 0 | 5 | 0 | 5 | 0 |
| | FW | (Spain) ESP | Veloso | 9 | 5 | 7 | 4 | 1 | 1 | 1 | 0 |
| | DF | (Spain) ESP | Calpe | 10 | 1 | 7 | 0 | 2 | 1 | 1 | 0 |
| | MF | (Spain) ESP | Tejada | 12 | 0 | 6 | 0 | 3 | 0 | 3 | 0 |
| | FW | (Paraguay) PAR | Bautista | 9 | 2 | 5 | 1 | 3 | 1 | 1 | 0 |
| | FW | (Spain) ESP | Bueno | 8 | 3 | 4 | 1 | 4 | 2 | 0 | 0 |
| | DF | (Spain) ESP | Casado | 1 | 0 | 0 | 0 | 1 | 0 | 0 | 0 |
| | MF | (Spain) ESP | Pipi Suárez | | | | | | | | |
| | FW | (Spain) ESP | Morollon | | | | | | | | |
| | FW | (Belgium) BEL | Goyvaerts | | | | | | | | |
| | FW | (Spain) ESP | Blanco | | | | | | | | |
| | FW | (Spain) ESP | Garcia-Ramos | | | | | | | | |

- Source: http://www.bdfutbol.com/en/t/t1965-662.html

== See also ==
- Yé-yé (Real Madrid)
