= 1966 European Cup final =

- Match programme cover
- Event: 1965–66 European Cup
Real Madrid	Partizan
(Spain)	(Socialist Federal Republic of Yugoslavia)
2	1
- Date: 11 May 1966
- Venue: Heysel Stadium, Brussels
- Referee: Rudolf Kreitlein (West Germany)
- Attendance: 46,745

The 1966 European Cup final was a football match held at the Heysel Stadium, Brussels, on 11 May 1966 that saw Real Madrid of Spain defeat FK Partizan of Yugoslavia 2–1 to win the 1965–66 European Cup title.

== Route to the final ==
Real Madrid				Round	Partizan			
Opponent	Agg.	1st leg	2nd leg		Opponent	Agg.	1st leg	2nd leg
(Netherlands) Feyenoord	6–2	1–2 (A)	5–0 (H)	Prelim. round	(France) Nantes	4–2	2–0 (H)	2–2 (A)
(Scotland) Kilmarnock	7–3	2–2 (A)	5–1 (H)	First round	(West Germany) Werder Bremen	3–1	3–0 (H)	0–1 (A)
(Belgium) Anderlecht	4–3	0–1 (A)	4–2 (H)	Quarter-finals	(Czechoslovakia) Sparta Prague	6–4	1–4 (A)	5–0 (H)
(Italy) Internazionale	2–1	1–0 (H)	1–1 (A)	Semi-finals	(England) Manchester United	2–1	2–0 (H)	0–1 (A)

== Match ==
=== Summary ===
Partizan took the lead through a goal by Velibor Vasović in the 55th minute, but Real Madrid equalised in the 70th minute through Spanish international Amancio. Fernando Serena scored the winner for Real six minutes later.

This was Real Madrid's sixth European Cup triumph in the 11 years of the tournament's existence, with Paco Gento being the only Madrid player to win all of these. However, they would not win the competition again until 1998, when Predrag Mijatović–– who was, coincidentally, a former Partizan player–– scored the winning goal in the 66th minute of the final.

=== Details ===
11 May 1966
19:30 CET

Real Madrid (Spain)	2–1	(Socialist Federal Republic of Yugoslavia) Partizan
Amancio 70'; Serena 76'	Report	Vasović 55'

Heysel Stadium, Brussels
Attendance: 46,745
Referee: Rudolf Kreitlein (West Germany)

Real Madrid	Partizan

GK	1	(Spain) José Araquistáin
RB	2	(Spain) Pachín
LB	3	(Spain) Manuel Sanchís
RM	4	(Spain) Pirri
CB	5	(Spain) Pedro de Felipe
CB	6	(Spain) Ignacio Zoco
RF	7	(Spain) Fernando Serena
CF	8	(Spain) Amancio
CF	9	(Spain) Ramón Grosso
LM	10	(Spain) Manuel Velázquez
LF	11	(Spain) Paco Gento (c)
Manager:
(Spain) Miguel Muñoz

GK	1	(Socialist Federal Republic of Yugoslavia) Milutin Šoškić (c)
RB	2	(Socialist Federal Republic of Yugoslavia) Fahrudin Jusufi
LB	3	(Socialist Federal Republic of Yugoslavia) Ljubomir Mihajlović
CM	4	(Socialist Federal Republic of Yugoslavia) Radoslav Bečejac
CB	5	(Socialist Federal Republic of Yugoslavia) Velibor Vasović
CB	6	(Socialist Federal Republic of Yugoslavia) Branko Rašović
RF	7	(Socialist Federal Republic of Yugoslavia) Mane Bajić
CM	8	(Socialist Federal Republic of Yugoslavia) Vladica Kovačević
CF	9	(Socialist Federal Republic of Yugoslavia) Mustafa Hasanagić
CF	10	(Socialist Federal Republic of Yugoslavia) Milan Galić
LF	11	(Socialist Federal Republic of Yugoslavia) Josip Pirmajer
Manager:
(Socialist Federal Republic of Yugoslavia) Abdulah Gegić

== See also ==
- 1965–66 Real Madrid CF season
- 1965–66 FK Partizan season
- 1966 European Cup Winners' Cup final
- 1966 Inter-Cities Fairs Cup final
- 1966 Intercontinental Cup
- Real Madrid CF in international football
- FK Partizan in European football
