= Milutin Šoškić =

Serbian footballer (1937–2022)

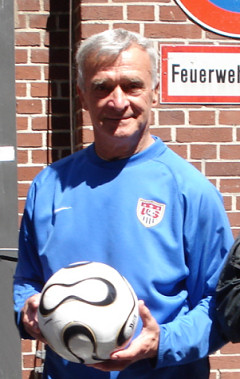
- Šoškić in 2006

Personal information
- Date of birth: 31 December 1937
- Place of birth: Peć, Kingdom of Yugoslavia
- Date of death: 27 August 2022 (aged 84)
- Height: 1.80 m (5 ft 11 in)
- Position: Goalkeeper

Youth career
- 1948–1955: Partizan

Senior career*
Years	Team	Apps	(Gls)
1955–1966	Partizan	169	(0)
1966–1971	1. FC Köln	65	(0)
Total		234	(0)

International career
1959–1966	Yugoslavia	50	(0)

Managerial career
- 1973–1976: OFK Beograd
- 1977–1978: OFK Kikinda
- 1979–1990: Partizan (assistant)
- 1993–2006: United States (goalkeeper coach)
Medal record
Men's Football
Representing Yugoslavia
Olympic Games
Gold medal – first place	1960 Rome	Team
European Championship
Silver medal – second place	1960 France	Team
- * Club domestic league appearances and goals

Milutin Šoškić (Serbian Cyrillic: Милутин Шошкић; 31 December 1937 – 27 August 2022) was a Serbian professional footballer who played as a goalkeeper. He is considered one of FK Partizan's greatest players.

== Biography ==
He was born in Jablanica, a village near Peć from father Jeremija, a royal officer and mother Radunka. He spent World War II in exile in the Serbian Patriarchate of Peć.

== Club career ==
Šoškić started training football when he was 11 in Red Star, for which he played six months, but because of a small misunderstanding with the host of the stadium, he decided to continue his career at Partizan where he spent most of his career.

=== European Cup final with Partizan ===
In the sixties, Šoškić and others became known as the "Partizan babies", a group of youngsters who turned Partizan into one of the better teams in Europe with four national championships. Of the four trophies they won in the Yugoslav First League in five seasons, three of them were won in a row; 1960–61, 1961–62 and 1962–63.

Šoškić experienced great recognition when he was invited to play in the 1963 England v Rest of the World football match at Wembley Stadium and secured his place among best football players of that time.

By winning the Yugoslav championship in the 1964–65 season, Partizan acquired the right to play in the European Cup 1965–66. Partizan was led by coach Abdulah Gegić.

In the preliminary round Partizan played against French champions FC Nantes. With a 2:0 win in Belgrade at JNA Stadium and a draw 2:2 in a return match at Stade Marcel-Saupin, first obstacle was skipped with a total score of 4:2. The next opponent was the champion of West Germany, SV Werder Bremen. Werder was eliminated with a total score of 3:1, in Belgrade it was 3:0 and on Weser-Stadion in Bremen 0:1.

In the quarter-finals Partizan had to face champions of Czechoslovakia, AC Sparta Prague. First game at Stadion Letná Partizan lost 4:1, but won the second game in Belgrade with the result 5:0 and thus qualified for the semi-finals with a total score of 6:4.

In the semi-finals, they were facing English giants Manchester United with David Herd, Denis Law, Bobby Charlton and George Best. Partizan's babies won with a total score of 2:1 (2:0 in Belgrade and 0:1 in the return match at Old Trafford) and advanced to the finals.

On 11 May 1966, the final was played at Heysel Stadium in Brussels in front of 55,000 spectators. Partizan faced Spanish champions Real Madrid and took the lead in the 55th minute with a goal by Velibor Vasović. However, with two goals first by Amancio and second by Fernando Serena, Real managed to defeat Partizan and win the European title.

=== 1. FC Köln ===
When the conditions for going abroad were met, Šoškić decided to accept the offer of the West German 1. FC Köln. He played in 65 games. However, a severe leg fracture soon followed, which caused him to take a long break. Šoškić returned to active football, but a new leg fracture finally forced him to end his career.

== International career ==
After performing well at Partizan he was invited to play for the Yugoslavia national team. Šoškić inherited the position of Vladimir Beara as a new goalkeeper. For Yugoslavia he played 50 games.

The first major competition that Šoškić played in with the national team was the 1960 European Nations' Cup. The team won the silver medal after winning the semi-final match against competition host France with the result of 5–4 which is still a record to this day of most goals scored in a single match in UEFA European Championship. In the finals, Yugoslavia was defeated by Soviet Union 2–1 after extra time.

That same year Šoškić won an Olympic gold medal at the 1960 Summer Olympics in Rome, Italy with the Yugoslavia national team. They topped their pool consisting of Bulgaria, United Arab Republic and Turkey before beating Italy in the semi-finals and crowning themselves champions after beating Denmark 3–1 in the final. At the tournament, Šoškić only conceded six goals.

At the 1962 FIFA World Cup in Chile Yugoslavia won fourth place after being defeated by Czechoslovakia 3–1 in semi-finals and Chile 1–0 in a third place match.

== Coaching career ==
After finishing his playing career, he finished high school coaching. He then became a coach at OFK Beograd which he remained for 3 years. Then he took over OFK Kikinda which he led in Yugoslav Second League. Then he returned to Partizan to be one of the assistant coaches. He worked together with Bora Milutinović and Nenad Bjeković.

After Milutinović became the coach of the United States national soccer team in 1993 Šoškić was appointed the goalkeeper's coach. He remained even after Milutinović left in 1995, continuing to work with the team under head coaches Steve Sampson and later Bruce Arena. He left the team along with Arena after the 2006 FIFA World Cup. During that time, the Americans participated in four World cups and had several quality goalkeepers such as: Brad Friedel, Kasey Keller, and Tim Howard.

== Death ==
Šoškić died on 27 August 2022.
