= Mane Bajić =

Serbian footballer

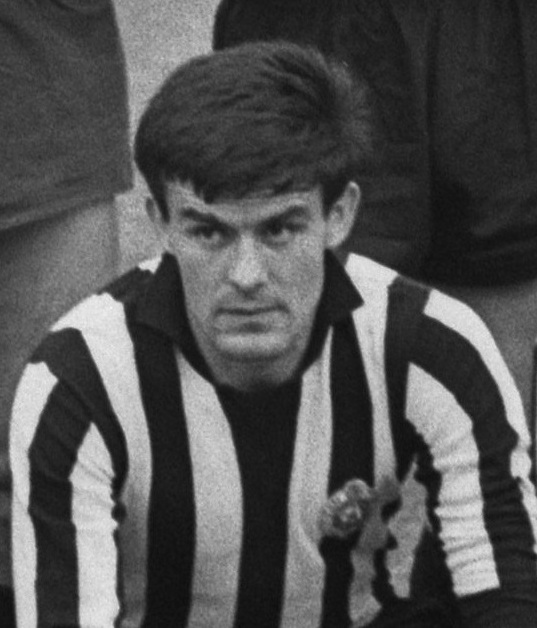
- Bajić in May 1966 ahead of Partizan's European Cup Final versus Real Madrid

Personal information
- Full name: Mane Bajić
- Date of birth: 7 December 1941
- Place of birth: Belgrade, Nazi-occupied Serbia
- Date of death: 6 March 1994 (aged 52)
- Place of death: Belgrade, FR Yugoslavia
- Position: Right wing

Senior career*
Years	Team	Apps	(Gls)
1962–1970	Partizan	208	(34)
1970–1972	Lille	38	(4)

International career
1966–1969	Yugoslavia	2	(0)

Managerial career
- 1973–1987: Kolubara
- 1987–1988: Turbina Vreoci
- 1989–1993: Kolubara
- * Club domestic league appearances and goals

Mane Bajić (Serbian Cyrillic: Мане Бајић; 7 December 1941 – 6 March 1994) was a Serbian footballer who played as a midfielder.

== Club career ==
Bajić experienced his football affirmation in Partizan, where he played from 1962 to 1970. During this period, he played a total of 451 games, 208 of which were championship games, and he scored 102 goals, of which 34 were championship goals.

With Partizan, he won two Yugoslav championship titles in seasons 1962–63 and 1964–65. With the Partizan team, he achieved his greatest success, playing in the European Cup final in 1965–66 against Real Madrid.

After Partizan, in 1970, Bajić found employment abroad, he signed for French Lille. He spends two seasons in Olympique and during that time, he plays 38 league games for Lille and scores 4 goals. after Lille he ends his active playing career.

== International career ==
Bajić made his debut for Yugoslavia in a November 1966 friendly match away against Bulgaria and he earned his second and final cap in an April 1969 World Cup qualification match against Spain.

== Death ==
He died in a traffic collision on 6 March 1994 in front of the Yugoslav Parliament building.
