= Ljubomir Mihajlović =

Yugoslav and Serbian footballer

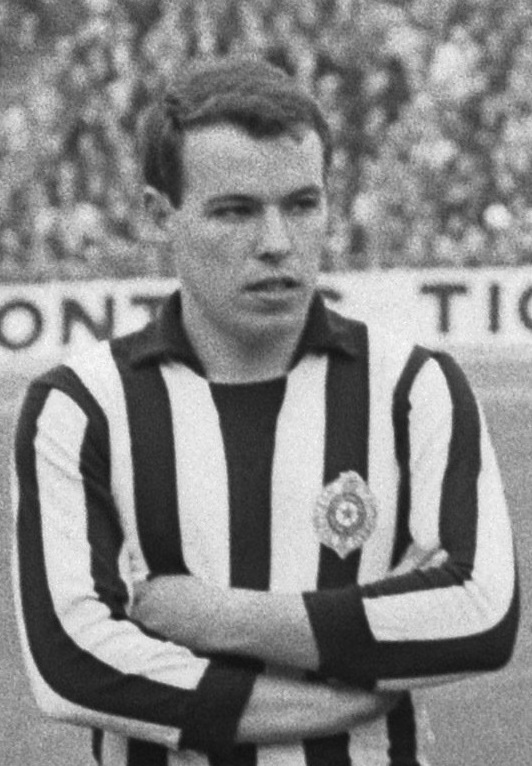
- Mihajlović lining up for Partizan at the 1966 European Cup Final

Personal information
- Date of birth: 4 September 1943 (age 83)
- Place of birth: Belgrade, German-occupied Serbia
- Height: 1.85 m (6 ft 1 in)
- Position: Defender

Youth career
- Partizan

Senior career*
Years	Team	Apps	(Gls)
1961–1970	Partizan	184	(2)
1970–1977	Lyon	233	(1)
1977–1978	Melun	30	(0)
Total		447	(3)

International career
1966–1968	Yugoslavia	6	(0)
Medal record
Silver medal – second place	UEFA European Championship	1968
- * Club domestic league appearances and goals

Ljubomir Mihajlović (Serbian Cyrillic: Љубомир Михајловић; born 4 September 1943) is a former Yugoslav and Serbian footballer who played as a defender.

== Club career ==
Mihajlović played for Partizan between 1961 and 1970, winning three Yugoslav First League titles (1961–62, 1962–63, and 1964–65). He was a member of the team that lost the 1966 European Cup Final to Real Madrid. In 1970, Mihajlović moved abroad to France and joined Lyon, spending there the next seven seasons. He made 233 appearances and scored one goal in the French top flight.

== International career ==
At international level, Mihajlović was capped six times for Yugoslavia. He was a member of the team at UEFA Euro 1968, as Yugoslavia lost in the final to Italy.

== Honours ==
Partizan

- Yugoslav First League: 1961–62, 1962–63, 1964–65

Yugoslavia

- UEFA European Championship runner-up: 1968
