= Velibor Vasović =

Serbian footballer (1939–2002)

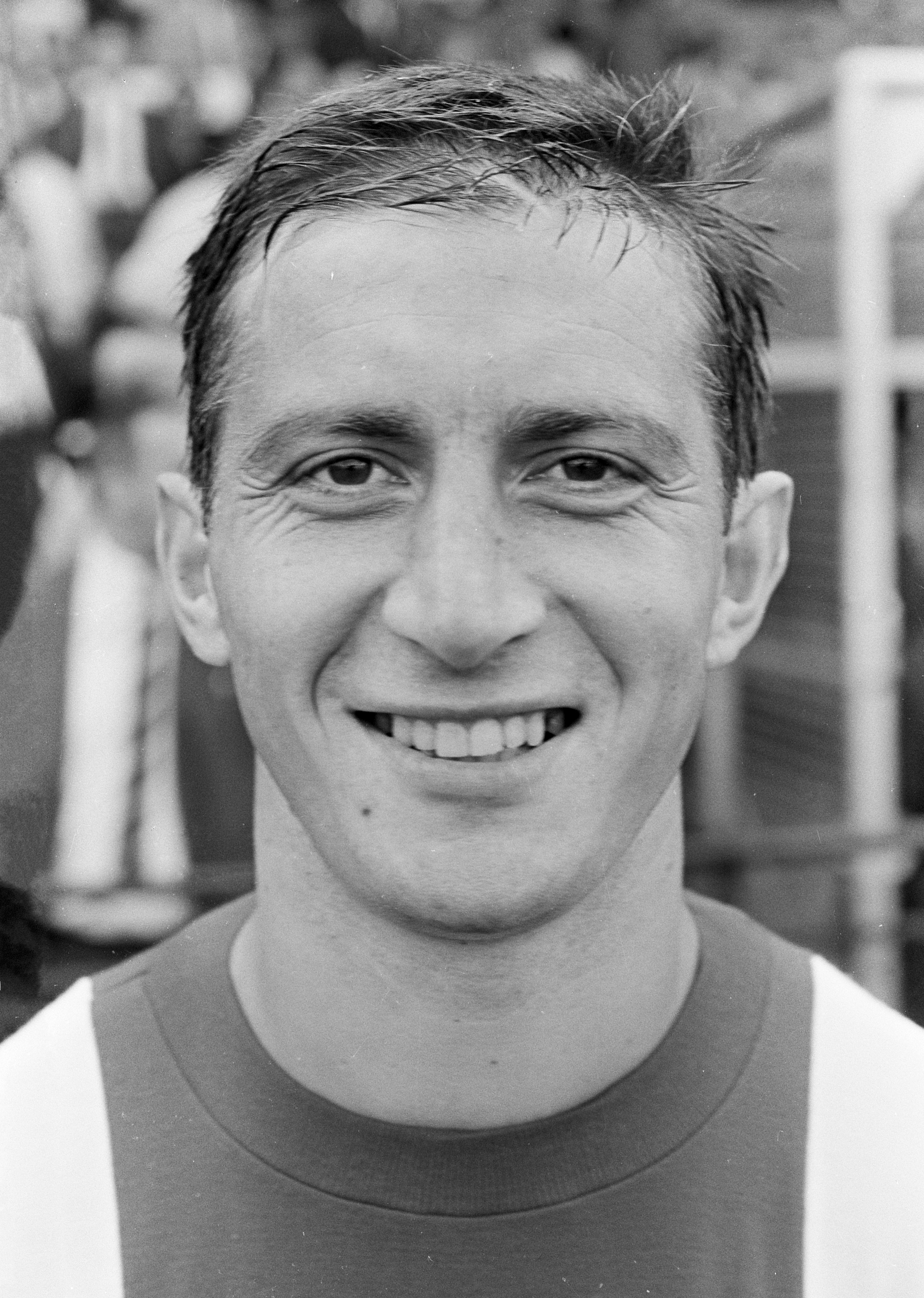
- Vasović in 1967

Personal information
- Date of birth: 3 October 1939
- Place of birth: Požarevac, Kingdom of Yugoslavia
- Date of death: 4 March 2002 (aged 62)
- Place of death: Belgrade, FR Yugoslavia
- Height: 1.80 m (5 ft 11 in)
- Position: Sweeper

Youth career
- 1954–1955: Novi Beograd
- 1955–1958: Partizan

Senior career*
Years	Team	Apps	(Gls)
1958–1963	Partizan	88	(6)
1963	Red Star Belgrade	13	(0)
1964–1966	Partizan	40	(4)
1966–1971	Ajax	145	(13)
Total		286	(23)

International career
1961–1966	Yugoslavia	32	(2)

Managerial career
- 1971: Proleter Zrenjanin (technical director)
- 1971–1973: Partizan
- 1975–1976: Angers
- 1976–1977: Paris Saint-Germain
- 1978–1979: Paris Saint-Germain
- 1982–1983: Zamalek
- 1983: Ethnikos Piraeus
- 1986–1988: Red Star Belgrade
- 1989: Bellinzona
- * Club domestic league appearances and goals

Velibor Vasović (Serbian Cyrillic: Велибор Васовић; 3 October 1939 – 4 March 2002) was a Serbian footballer and manager, also one of the legendary players of Partizan and Ajax and is regarded one of greatest defenders of his generation. A sweeper who could play in midfield, Vasović was renowned for his defensive positioning, never-say-die attitude and tactical awareness.

== Early life ==
Born on 3 October 1939, in Požarevac, on the eve of World War II, to parents hailing from Montenegro—tax office clerk Živojin Vasović and homemaker Jelena "Jelka" Laušević—young Velibor was the couple's ninth child. He had four older brothers and three older sisters, while another one of his sisters died before he was born. With the Nazi German invasion and subsequent dismemberment of the Yugoslav kingdom in April 1941, Vasović's father got taken prisoner by the Germans, spending four years in captivity, while his oldest siblings joined the Partisan resistance movement.

The youngster completed primary education in his hometown before moving to capital Belgrade along with his entire family courtesy of his maternal uncle David Laušević who in the meantime rose to high post with the Directorate for State Security (UDB). Vasović began his secondary studies by enrolling at the First Belgrade Gymnasium.

== Club career ==
Simultaneous with starting gymnasium studies, Vasović got introduced to the game of football at FK Novi Beograd, a small local lower-league outfit.

=== Partizan ===
In 1955, youngster's footballing talents got spotted by FK Partizan youth coach Florijan Matekalo, initiating fifteen-year-old Vasović's transfer across town to the big club's youth system where he came in alongside additional talented teenagers such as right back Fahrudin Jusufi and central midfielder Vladica Kovačević, brought in from Prilep and Ivanjica, respectively. Others already on the youth team were twin brothers Srđan and Zvezdan Čebinac as well as Branko Pejović. The entire talented generation soon came to be known as "Matekalo's Babies".

In June 1958, eighteen-year-old Vasović got moved up to the full squad. He spent five seasons at FK Partizan in this stint (June 1958 – June 1963) before controversially transferring to archrivals Red Star Belgrade during summer 1963.

=== Six months at Red Star Belgrade ===
In the summer of 1963, twenty-three-year-old Vasović was coming off another stellar season for Partizan in which he greatly contributed to the crno-beli winning their third consecutive league title. However, his contract with Partizan was set to expire. In a 1986 interview for Duga magazine, Vasović recalled how his transfer to Red Star came about:

Both my and Jusufi's contracts were expiring in the summer of 1963. And in addition to being key members of the Partizan team, both of us were also prominent national team players. My uncle David Laušević was a Partizan board member so the geniuses at the club figured 'We better throw a lot of money at Jusufi to prevent him from leaving while Vasović's gonna stay anyway because his uncle will take care of it'. Of course, I would have none of it so I immediately went across town to Red Star's technical director Aca Obradović and I literally told him 'Mr. Obradović, if Red Star has enough money I'd like to join your club'. So they dug into their emergency fund and paid me. Once the Partizan people found out, they were flabbergasted. Club president, JNA general Ilija Radaković, immediately approved payment of the double amount Red Star gave me. My phone was ringing off the hook, they were sending letters, they organized fan protests. I was also getting death threats. To this day I keep a letter in which one JNA officer threatens to kill me during a match with a sniper rifle. It's like a proper letter, he even included his full name, home address, and phone number.

Vasović reportedly received YUD5 million (enough to buy two Mercedes vehicles at the time) from Red Star.

At the start of the new league season, Vasović got a spot in Red Star's central defense alongside Milan Čop and Vojkan Melić. His first competitive match for Red Star on 1 September 1963 was also the grand opening of the club's still not fully finished grandiose new stadium Marakana as crveno-beli came from behind to beat NK Rijeka 2–1. The team easily led the league by five points at the winter break while defending league champion Partizan lagged far behind.

Over the winter break, another transfer saga involving Vasović ensued as Partizan club president Radaković was successful in persuading the player to come back for even more money than Red Star gave him. Vasović agreed, but he was under contract with Red Star and the club didn't want to sign off on the move despite being offered some money as a transfer fee. Vasović even resorted to unilaterally training with his old club.

With the league season restarting following the winter break, Vasović was in legal limbo, out of the Red Star lineup, though still having his salary paid by the club. After several months of sitting out, Vasović got instructed by the Partizan vice-president Čeda Džomba to try to get a meeting with the highest political authority in SR Serbia at the time, federal interior secretary Aleksandar Ranković, in order to finally resolve the situation. Vasović made the approach through private channels as his friend and teammate Zvezdan Čebinac was an old schoolmate of Ranković's son so Vasović managed to get a 45-minute meeting with Ranković at the recently built SIV building in New Belgrade where nothing concrete was promised other than Ranković saying he'll look into it. Several months later Red Star's technical director Obradović agreed to let Vasović return to Partizan while in return, as consolation of sorts for Red Star, Partizan's club president Radaković agreed to allow Zvezdan Čebinac's transfer to Red Star.

=== Return to Partizan ===
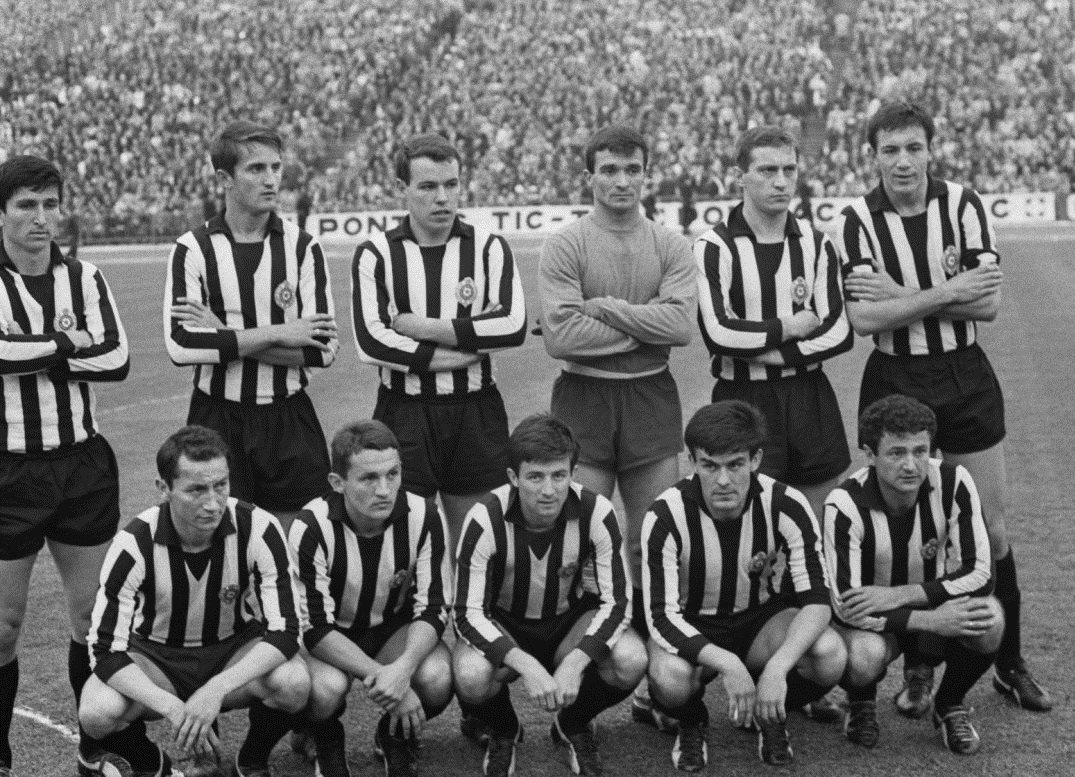
Vasović (standing 2nd from right) lining up with his Partizan teammates in May 1966 ahead of the 1965–66 European Cup final.

Vasović thus managed to get both his money and his wishes of return, but many within Partizan did not welcome him back with open arms. Some of the players saw his stunt as blackmail and were further unhappy that the club bent over backwards to accommodate any single player like that. Furthermore, his return took place against the backdrop of internal squabbles within the club's managing board, specifically between president Radaković and general-secretary Mirko Nenezić who acted as proxy for his brother, powerful JNA general Radojica Nenezić. The row started over the internal decision to relieve general-secretary Nenezić of his duties as a person in charge of finances, a move pushed through by president Radaković.

As the 1964–65 season began under new head coach Aleksandar Atanacković, Partizan led the league, but with each coming week the row in the managing board increasingly affected player relations. By December 1964, ahead of the last league fixture before the winter break, two opposing camps clearly emerged within the team—one group supporting dissenting general-secretary Nenezić was led by Jusufi and also included Milan Galić, Radoslav Bečejac, Joakim Vislavski, and head coach Atanacković while the other group supporting president Radaković was led by Vasović with Vladica Kovačević, Zoran Miladinović, and several youth players. Remaining players Milutin Šoškić, Ivan Ćurković, Josip Pirmajer, and Branko Rašović stayed neutral. The dissenting group even resorted to initiating a mutiny, refusing to travel to Skopje for the final match of the first half of the season versus FK Vardar. Seeing they were missing half of their team along with head coach Atanacković, president Radaković handed the head coaching reins to Mile Kos for one match. In difficult circumstances, Kos managed to put together eleven players and Partizan managed to retain the top league spot as winter break commenced. The very next day after the Skopje debacle, head coach Atanacković was relieved of his duties as the two factions prepared for the final showdown at the club's general assembly scheduled for January 1965 at the University of Belgrade's Faculty of Law. The assembly saw the two groups of players make up. Still, the case even got to the highest echelons of power in Yugoslavia as general Ivan Gošnjak, reporting directly to marshal Tito, became aware of his fellow JNA generals causing problems within the Partizan management. Once Tito caught whiff of this, he acted swiftly, ordering action against each officer from the club's management board involved in the row by having them reassigned to another location. General Radaković thus got moved to SR Slovenia while general Radojica Nenezić got assigned to Skopje. Vladimir Dujić, a civilian, became the new club president. The head coaching duties were handed to Marko Valok.

Several months later Partizan played a friendly versus AC Milan that went down in infamy for Vasović getting into a vicious fist fight with Milan's Peruvian defender Víctor Benítez, all of which prompted a bench-clearing brawl. Though unpleasant, the ugly fracas actually served to further solidify the newly unified team spirit of the recently fractured Partizan squad.

=== Ajax ===
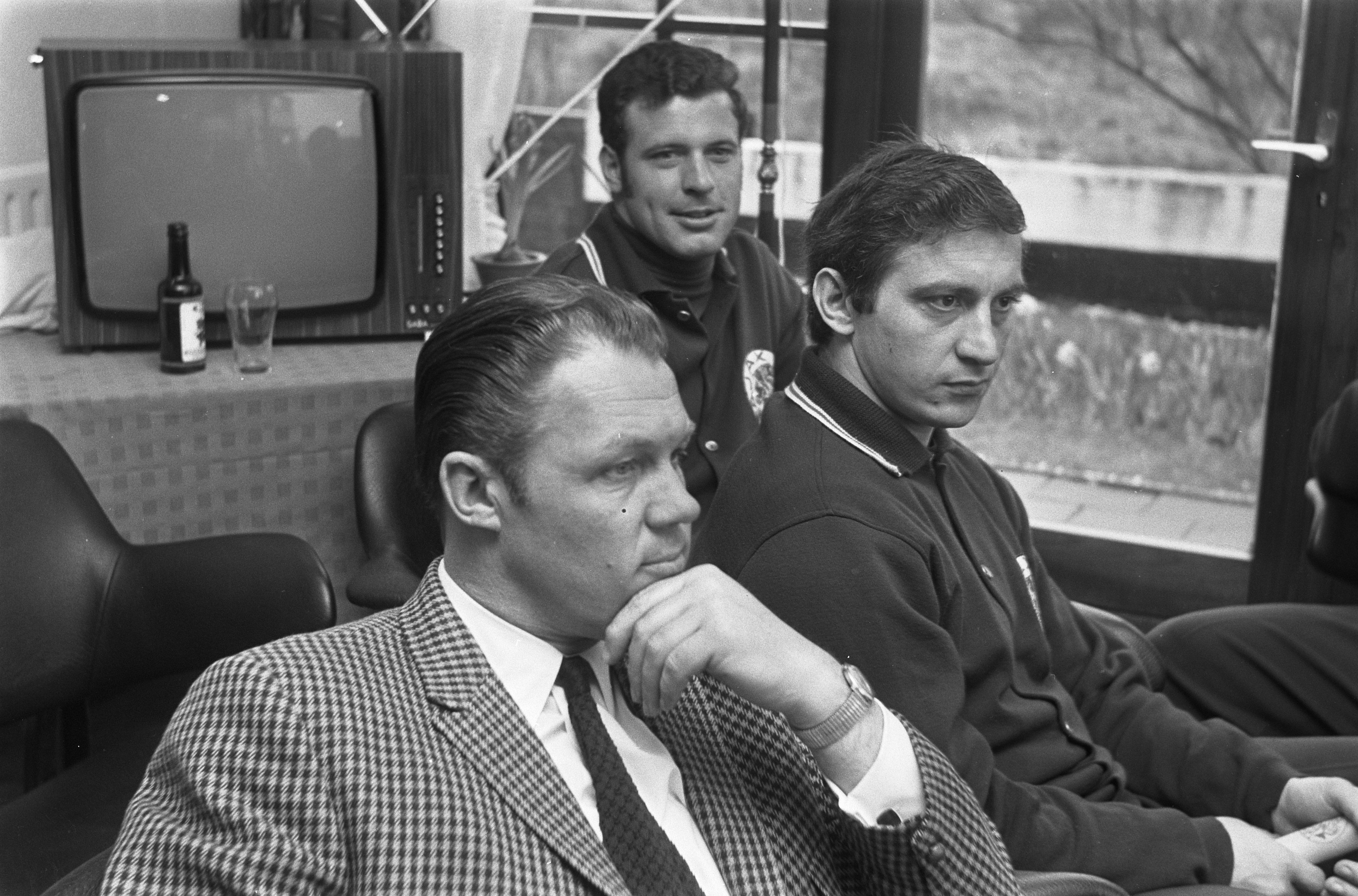
Vasović (right) with Heinz Stuy and Rinus Michels in 1969

Vasović transferred to Ajax after he had lost 2–1 to Real Madrid with Partizan in the 1966 European Cup final (scoring the only goal for his team). He did the same (4–1 loss to AC Milan, scoring from the spot) in the 1969 European Cup final, before leading Ajax as captain to a 2–0 victory over Panathinaikos in the 1971 European Cup final.

He played five seasons for the Dutch giants (1966–1971) and was the first foreign captain in the club's history.

He played 32 games for the Yugoslavia national team. During his career with Partizan he won four Yugoslav Championships (1960–61, 1961–62, 1962–63, 1964–65) and leading Partizan as captain to the 1966 European Cup Final.

Vasović's career was relatively short. He only played 13 professional seasons due to the asthmatic condition he was suffering from.

== International career ==
In the Yugoslavia national team Vasović appeared from 1961 until 1966 in 32 fixtures and scoring two goals. His final international was a June 1966 friendly match away against Sweden.

Scores and results list Yugoslavia's goal tally first, score column indicates score after each Vasović goal.

List of international goals scored by Velibor Vasović
No.	Date	Venue	Opponent	Score	Result	Competition
1	4 November 1962	Belgrade, Yugoslavia	Belgium	3–2	3–2	UEFA Euro 1964 qualifying
2	7 November 1965	Belgrade, Yugoslavia	Norway	1–1	1–1	1966 FIFA World Cup qualification

== Coaching career ==
After ending his career as a player in 1971, he coached FK Partizan (second part of 1971–72 season, full 1972–73, and the first part of 1973–74), Angers SCO (1975–1976), Paris Saint-Germain (first part of 1976–77 and the first part of 1978–79 seasons). He also managed Egyptian club Zamalek SC (1982–1983), Ethnikos Piraeus (1983), Red Star Belgrade (1986–1988), and AC Bellinzona (1989) before returning home to Belgrade and working as a lawyer. During his coaching career, he managed to win one French Division 2, in 1975–76 season, with Angers, and one Yugoslav Championship, in 1987–88 season, with Red Star.

== Honours ==
=== Player ===
Partizan

- Yugoslav First League: 1960–61, 1961–62, 1962–63, 1964–65

Red Star Belgrade

- Yugoslav First League: 1963–64

Ajax

- Eredivisie: 1966–67, 1967–68, 1969–70
- KNVB Cup: 1966–67, 1969–70, 1970–71
- European Cup: 1970–71

=== Head coach ===
Angers

- French Division 2: 1975–76

Red Star Belgrade

- Yugoslav First League: 1987–88

== Other endeavours ==
Vasović was one of the strongest and most persistent critics of the Yugoslav Football Association (FSJ) leadership, especially its longtime president Miljan Miljanić. His criticism particularly intensified after the breakup of SFR Yugoslavia. In 1997 Vasović founded an organization called Udruženje za razvoj i prosperitet jugoslovenskog fudbala (Organization for the Development and Prosperity of Yugoslav Football) through which he channeled his criticism of the FSJ.

Throughout the summer of 2000 he spoke at various town hall meetings throughout Serbia organized by the Yugoslav Left (JUL), a political party headed by the Yugoslav president Slobodan Milošević's wife Mira Marković. On 10 October 2000, five days after the overthrow of Milošević's regime in Serbia, Vasović and about a dozen bodyguards broke into the FSJ offices at Terazije square in downtown Belgrade. They attempted to use the post-overthrow chaos and confusion in order to gain the upper hand in the expected FA leadership change, however they were unsuccessful.

He graduated from the University of Belgrade Faculty of Law.

== Personal life ==
Velibor Vasović was married twice, first with Mirjana Preradović, and then to Branka Zorić. He had two sons, both with his first wife, Vladimir (1963) and Aleksandar (1968). From his younger son he has a granddaughter, Tara (2009), and a grandson, Stefan (2015).

He died in 2002 following a heart attack at the age of 62 and was buried in the Alley of Distinguished Citizens at Belgrade's New Cemetery.
