= 1962–63 Yugoslav First League =

Prva savezna liga
- Season: 1962–63
- Dates: 19 August 1962 – 9 June 1963
- Champions: Partizan (5th title)
- Relegated: Sloboda; Budućnost
- European Cup: Partizan
- Cup Winners' Cup: Dinamo Zagreb
- Inter-Cities Fairs Cup: OFK Beograd; Trešnjevka
- Top goalscorer: Mišo Smajlović (18)

The 1962–63 Yugoslav First League season was the 17th season of the First Federal League (Serbo-Croatian: Prva savezna liga), the top level association football league of SFR Yugoslavia, since its establishment in 1946. Fourteen teams contested the competition, with Partizan winning their fifth title.

== Teams ==
Due to the expansion of the league from 12 to 14 clubs two teams were relegated at the end of the previous season (Vardar and Borac) and four were promoted - Budućnost, Radnički Niš, Željezničar and Sloboda.

Team	Location	Federal Republic	Position in 1961–62
Budućnost	Titograd	SR Montenegro	—N/a
Dinamo Zagreb	Zagreb	SR Croatia	3rd
Hajduk Split	Split	SR Croatia	5th
Novi Sad	Novi Sad	SR Serbia	10th
OFK Belgrade	Belgrade	SR Serbia	6th
Partizan	Belgrade	SR Serbia	1st
Radnički Niš	Niš	SR Serbia	—N/a
Red Star	Belgrade	SR Serbia	4th
Rijeka	Rijeka	SR Croatia	8th
Sarajevo	Sarajevo	SR Bosnia and Herzegovina	7th
Sloboda	Tuzla	SR Bosnia and Herzegovina	—N/a
Velež	Mostar	SR Bosnia and Herzegovina	9th
Vojvodina	Novi Sad	SR Serbia	2nd
Željezničar	Sarajevo	SR Bosnia and Herzegovina	—N/a

== League table ==
Pos	Team	Pld	W	D	L	GF	GA	GD	Pts	Qualification or relegation
1	Partizan (C)	26	16	8	2	58	22	+36	40	Qualification for European Cup preliminary round
2	Dinamo Zagreb	26	14	7	5	52	35	+17	35	Qualification for Cup Winners' Cup first round
3	Željezničar	26	11	7	8	49	31	+18	29	
4	Velež	26	10	8	8	33	31	+2	28	
5	OFK Belgrade	26	10	8	8	42	40	+2	28	Invitation for Inter-Cities Fairs Cup first round
6	Radnički Niš	26	10	6	10	43	33	+10	26	
7	Red Star Belgrade	26	7	11	8	21	26	−5	25	
8	Novi Sad	26	7	10	9	29	37	−8	24	
9	Sarajevo	26	9	5	12	28	40	−12	23	
10	Rijeka	26	10	3	13	28	41	−13	23	
11	Hajduk Split	26	9	5	12	26	43	−17	23	
12	Vojvodina	26	9	4	13	43	40	+3	22	
13	Sloboda Tuzla (R)	26	8	4	14	29	43	−14	20	Relegation to Yugoslav Second League
14	Budućnost (R)	26	5	8	13	19	38	−19	18	Relegation to Yugoslav Second League

Source: rsssf.org
Rules for classification: 1) points; 2) goal difference; 3) number of goals scored.
(C) Champions; (R) Relegated

== Results ==
Home \ Away	BUD	DIN	HAJ	NSD	OFK	PAR	RNI	RSB	RIJ	SAR	SLO	VEL	VOJ	ŽEL
Budućnost		1–1	0–0	1–2	0–1	0–2	3–1	0–0	1–3	0–1	2–1	3–3	1–0	0–0
Dinamo Zagreb	2–0		0–1	0–3	1–0	3–3	4–1	0–0	5–0	4–0	5–2	2–1	1–0	2–1
Hajduk Split	1–2	1–4		2–1	1–0	1–1	2–1	2–0	0–2	2–0	1–2	2–0	2–1	0–0
Novi Sad	0–0	1–2	0–0		1–2	2–2	2–1	1–1	2–2	1–0	3–2	0–0	1–0	1–0
OFK Belgrade	2–1	3–3	1–0	1–1		1–3	3–3	2–2	6–1	5–3	2–1	0–1	3–2	2–0
Partizan	3–0	1–1	4–1	5–1	2–1		0–0	1–2	2–0	2–0	4–0	4–1	4–3	1–1
Radnički Niš	0–0	3–1	5–1	2–0	3–0	0–1		3–0 (Note: Match awarded 3–0 to Radnički.)	3–0	2–0	0–2	3–0	5–3	1–1
Red Star	0–0	1–1	1–0	4–2	0–0	0–5	1–0		1–0	1–1	2–1	0–0	0–1	3–0
Rijeka	2–0	0–2	4–0	2–1	2–2	0–2	0–0	1–0		1–2	3–0	1–0	2–0	1–0
Sarajevo	1–0	2–0	2–2	3–1	1–2	1–1	2–1	0–0	1–0		2–1	0–0	0–3	1–2
Sloboda Tuzla	1–0	5–1	2–1	0–0	0–0	0–2	1–2	0–0	1–0	1–0		1–1	3–1	0–2
Velež	3–1	2–3	1–2	1–1	2–1	0–1	2–1	1–0	1–0	3–1	4–0		3–2	1–0
Vojvodina	2–3	2–3	7–1	0–0	1–1	1–1	2–0	1–0	3–0	3–1	1–0	1–1		0–2
Željezničar	6–0	1–1	2–0	4–1	5–2	2–1	2–2	3–2	6–1	2–3	4–2	1–1	2–3	

Source: DataSoccer.it
Legend: Blue = home team win; Yellow = draw; Red = away team win.

== Winning squad ==
Champions: FK Partizan (head coach: Stjepan Bobek)

Player (league matches/league goals)

- Vladica Kovačević (26/14)
- Milutin Šoškić (26/0) (goalkeeper)
- Milan Galić (25/16)
- Fahrudin Jusufi (25/0)
- Velibor Vasović (24/2)
- Ljubomir Mihajlović (23/0)
- Milan Vukelić (18/2)
- Joakim Vislavski (16/7)
- Zvezdan Čebinac (16/0)
- Bora Milutinović (15/1)
- Velimir Sombolac (14/0)
- Mustafa Hasanagić (12/4)
- Anton Rudinski (8/6)
- Aleksandar Jončić (8/0)
- Ivan Rajić (6/1)
- Lazar Radović (5/2)
- Milorad Milutinović (5/0)
- Ilija Mitić (5/0)
- Dragomir Slišković (5/0)
- Branislav Mihajlović (4/1)
- Mane Bajić (4/0)
- Miodrag Petrović (3/1)
- Vladimir Petrović (3/0)
- Dragoslav Jovanović (2/0)
- Milan Damjanović (1/0)
- Zenun Brovina
- Dimitrije Davidović
- Poljan
- Jankulovski
- Milanović

== Top scorers ==
Rank	Player	Club	Goals
1	(Socialist Federal Republic of Yugoslavia) Mišo Smajlović	Željezničar	18
2	(Socialist Federal Republic of Yugoslavia) Slaven Zambata	Dinamo Zagreb	17
3	(Socialist Federal Republic of Yugoslavia) Đorđe Pavlić	Vojvodina	16
3	(Socialist Federal Republic of Yugoslavia) Milan Galić	Partizan	16
5	(Socialist Federal Republic of Yugoslavia) Vladica Kovačević	Partizan	15
6	(Socialist Federal Republic of Yugoslavia) Dražan Jerković	Dinamo Zagreb	12
7	(Socialist Federal Republic of Yugoslavia) Josip Skoblar	OFK Belgrade	11
8	(Socialist Federal Republic of Yugoslavia) Mirko Gašić	Željezničar	10
8	(Socialist Federal Republic of Yugoslavia) Silvester Takač	Vojvodina	10
8	(Socialist Federal Republic of Yugoslavia) Vinko Zadel	Rijeka	10
8	(Socialist Federal Republic of Yugoslavia) Vitomir Sovrović	Radnički Niš	10

== See also ==
- 1962–63 Yugoslav Second League
- 1962–63 Yugoslav Cup
