= Mustafa Hasanagić =

Yugoslav football manager and player (1941–2023)

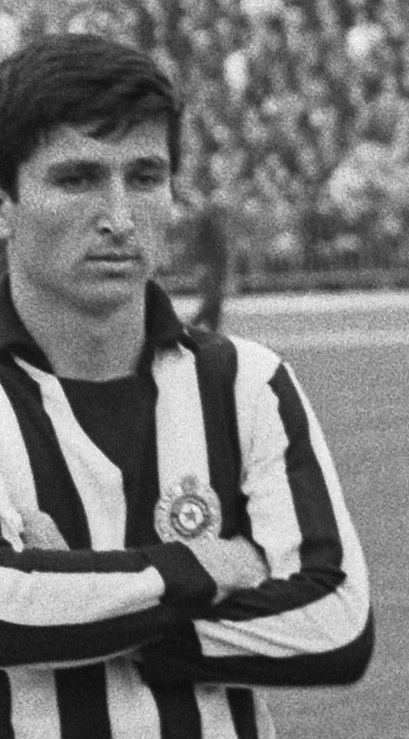
- Hasanagić lining up for Partizan ahead of the 1966 European Cup final

Personal information
- Full name: Mustafa Hasanagić
- Date of birth: 20 April 1941
- Place of birth: Priboj, Italian-occupied Montenegro
- Date of death: 12 November 2023 (aged 82)
- Place of death: Belgrade, Serbia
- Height: 1.80 m (5 ft 11 in)
- Position: Striker

Youth career
- FAP

Senior career*
Years	Team	Apps	(Gls)
1958–1961	FAP		
1961–1969	Partizan	104	(56)
1969–1970	Servette	10	(11)
1970–1971	La Chaux-de-Fonds	24	(7)
1971–1973	FAP	53	(21)
Total		191	(95)

International career
1965–1967	Yugoslavia	5	(0)

Managerial career
- 1974–1976: Ankaragücü
- 1979: Syria
- * Club domestic league appearances and goals

Mustafa Hasanagić (Serbian Cyrillic: Мустафа Хасанагић; 20 April 1941 – 12 November 2023) was a Yugoslav and Serbian football manager and player.

== Club career ==
After starting at his hometown club FAP, Hasanagić was transferred to Yugoslav First League side Partizan in 1961. He spent eight seasons with the Crno-beli and won three championship titles (1961–62, 1962–63, and 1964–65). In total, Hasanagić played 104 games in the top flight and scored 56 times in the process, finishing as the league's top scorer in 1966–67. He also helped the team reach the European Cup final in 1966, contributing with six goals. In 1969, Hasanagić went abroad to Switzerland to play for Servette. He also spent one season with fellow Swiss club La Chaux-de-Fonds before returning to FAP.

== International career ==
At international level, Hasanagić was capped five times for Yugoslavia, making his debut on 7 November 1965 in a World Cup qualifier with Norway, a 1–1 home draw. His final cap came on 3 May 1967 in a Euro qualifier with West Germany, a 1–0 home win.

== Managerial career ==
After hanging up his boots, Hasanagić served as manager of several clubs, most notably Ankaragücü in Turkey from 1974 to 1976. He also coached the Syrian national team in 1979.

== Death ==
Hasanagić died on 12 November 2023.

== Honours ==
Partizan

- Yugoslav First League: 1961–62, 1962–63, 1964–65

Individual

- Yugoslav First League top scorer: 1966–67
