= Abdulah Gegić =

Yugoslav football manager and player (1924–2008)

Personal information
- Full name: Abdulah Gegić
- Date of birth: 19 March 1924
- Place of birth: Novi Pazar, Kingdom of Serbs, Croats and Slovenes
- Date of death: 21 June 2008 (aged 84)
- Place of death: Novi Sad, Serbia
- Position: Defender

Senior career*
Years	Team	Apps	(Gls)
1947	Metalac Beograd	2	(0)
1948–1952	Mačva Šabac	58	(1)
1953	Sarajevo	8	(0)
Total		68	(1)

Managerial career
- 1961–1963: Bor
- 1963: Radnički Niš
- 1963–1965: Sarajevo
- 1965: Yugoslavia (co-manager)
- 1965–1966: Partizan
- 1966–1967: Fenerbahçe
- 1967–1971: Eskişehirspor
- 1969: Turkey
- 1971–1972: Sarajevo
- 1972–1973: Beşiktaş
- 1973–1974: Adana Demirspor
- 1974–1975: Bursaspor
- 1975–1976: Fenerbahçe
- 1976: Adanaspor
- 1977–1978: Eskişehirspor
- 1978–1979: Samsunspor
- 1979: Diyarbakırspor
- 1980–1981: Sloga Kraljevo
- 1981–1983: Trepça
- 1983: Eskişehirspor
- 1984–1985: Novi Sad
- * Club domestic league appearances and goals

Abdulah Gegić (Serbian Cyrillic: Абдулах Гегић, Turkish: Abdullah Gegiç; 19 March 1924 – 21 June 2008) was a Yugoslav football manager and player.

== Playing career ==
Following World War II, Gegić played for Metalac Beograd in the inaugural Yugoslav First League season. He later spent four years with Mačva Šabac (initially known as Podrinje), helping the club earn promotion to the top flight for the first time ever. Before retiring, Gegić also briefly played for Sarajevo.

== Managerial career ==
After hanging up his boots, Gegić started his managerial career at Deževa. He spent several years as manager of his hometown club before joining Bor in the summer of 1961. Gegić later took charge of Yugoslav First League side Radnički Niš in the second part of the 1962–63 season. He left the club over the summer and took charge of league rivals Sarajevo. During his two years at Koševo, Gegić enjoyed success with the team in the top flight, leading them to a runner-up finish in 1964–65.

Following his breakthrough season at Sarajevo, Gegić was appointed as manager of Partizan, the reigning Yugoslav champions. He guided them to the 1965–66 European Cup final, eventually losing 2–1 to Real Madrid. Shortly following the loss, Gegić left the club and went to Turkey, becoming manager of Fenerbahçe.

Between 1967 and 1971, Gegić served as manager of Eskişehirspor, finishing as runners-up in two consecutive seasons (1968–69 and 1969–70) and winning the Turkish Cup in 1970–71. He subsequently returned to Yugoslavia for his second stint as manager of Sarajevo, but went back to Turkey the following year and took charge of Beşiktaş. Throughout the rest of the 1970s, Gegić was also manager of Adana Demirspor, Bursaspor, Adanaspor, Samsunspor, and Diyarbakırspor.

== Personal life ==
His surname is derived from Albanian ethnic subgroup of Ghegs.

Gegić and his wife welcomed their first son the day before the 1966 European Cup final and named him Brisel in honor of the event's host city.

In January 1977, Gegić was granted Turkish citizenship together with his wife.

Gegić died on 21 June 2008, at the age of 84, 17 days after suffering a stroke.

== Career statistics ==
Appearances and goals by club, season and competition
Club	Season	League		
Club	Season	Division	Apps	Goals
Metalac Beograd	1946–47	Yugoslav First League	2	0
Mačva Šabac	1948–49	Yugoslav Second League	16	1
Mačva Šabac	1950	Yugoslav Second League	14	0
Mačva Šabac	1951	Yugoslav First League	18	0
Mačva Šabac	1952	Yugoslav First League	10	0
Mačva Šabac	Total		58	1
Sarajevo	1953–54	Yugoslav First League	8	0
Career total			68	1

== Honours ==
Partizan

- European Cup runner-up: 1965–66

Fenerbahçe

- Spor Toto Cup: 1966–67

Eskişehirspor

- Turkish Cup: 1970–71
- Turkish Super Cup: 1971
