= Fernando Serena =

Spanish footballer (1941–2018)

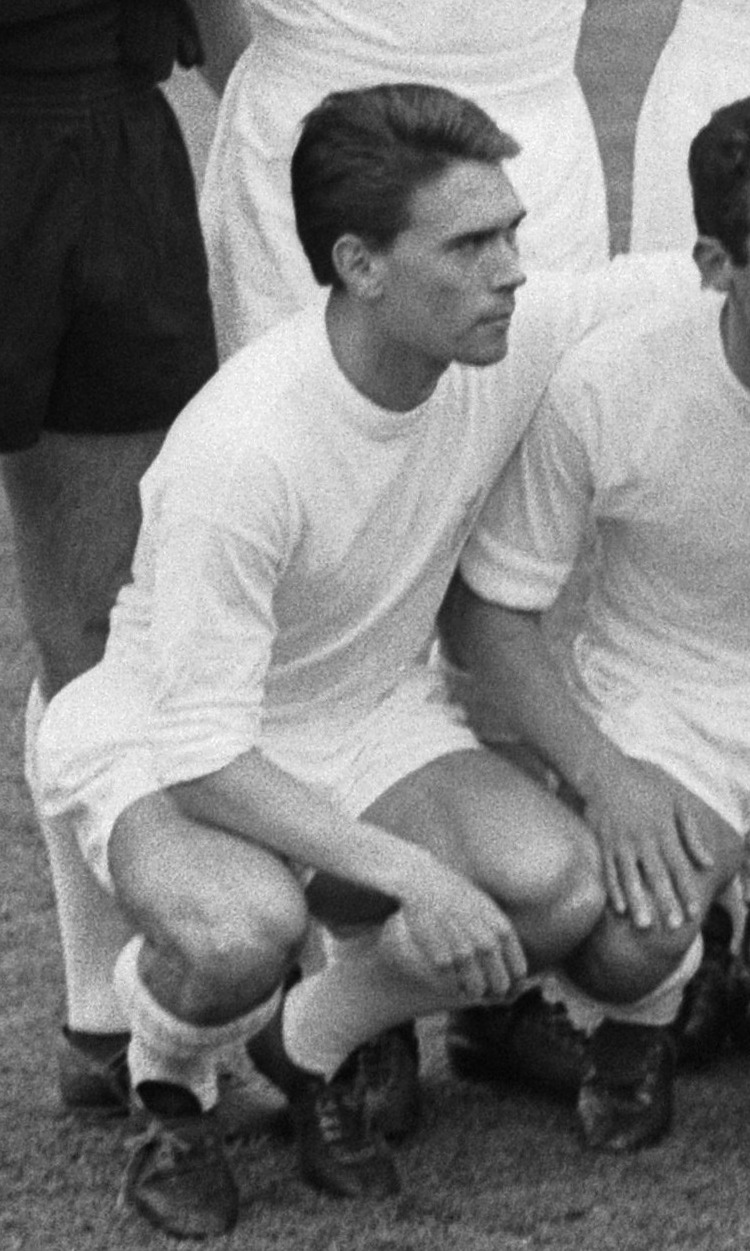
- Serena with Real Madrid in 1966

Personal information
- Full name: Fernando Rodríguez Serena
- Date of birth: 28 January 1941
- Place of birth: Madrid, Spain
- Date of death: 15 October 2018 (aged 77)
- Place of death: Pamplona, Spain
- Height: 1.65 m (5 ft 5 in)
- Position: Winger

Youth career
- Real Madrid

Senior career*
Years	Team	Apps	(Gls)
1960–1961	Plus Ultra	25	(4)
1961–1968	Real Madrid	54	(11)
1961–1963	→ Osasuna (loan)	51	(9)
1968–1970	Elche	39	(3)
1970–1976	Sant Andreu	173	(18)
Total		342	(45)

International career
1959	Spain U18	1	(0)
1963	Spain	1	(0)
- * Club domestic league appearances and goals

Fernando Rodríguez Serena (28 January 1941 – 15 October 2018) was a Spanish footballer who played as a right winger.

He appeared in 144 La Liga matches during nine seasons, scoring a combined 23 goals for Real Madrid, Osasuna and Elche. With the first club, he won the 1966 European Cup.

== Club career ==
Born in Madrid, Serena finished his development at Real Madrid, and started his senior career with their reserves. He then served a two-year loan at CA Osasuna, making his La Liga debut on 3 September 1961 in a 2–2 home draw against RCD Español and scoring his first goal two weeks later to help the hosts defeat Atlético Madrid 3–1.

Returned to the Santiago Bernabéu Stadium, Serena went on appear in 86 competitive matches (15 goals) and be part of the squads that won four national championships and the 1965–66 edition of the European Cup. In the latter competition, he scored the winning goal in the final against FK Partizan, controlling the ball with his chest and volleying in from outside the box in a 2–1 win in Brussels.

After a further two top flight seasons with Elche CF, with whom he took part in the 1969 Copa del Generalísimo Final against Athletic Bilbao, Serena signed with Segunda División club UE Sant Andreu in 1970. After 210 games across all competitions at the Camp Municipal Narcís Sala, he retired at the age of 35.

== International career ==
Serena earned one cap for Spain, playing the second half of the 0–0 friendly home draw to France on 9 January 1963 after coming on as a 46th-minute substitute for Enrique Collar.

== Death ==
Serena died in Pamplona, Navarre on 15 October 2018, at the age of 77. He had settled in the city after retiring, marrying María Ángeles Gastón and fathering two children.

== Honours ==
Real Madrid

- La Liga: 1963–64, 1964–65, 1966–67, 1967–68
- European Cup: 1965–66
