= Radoslav Bečejac =

Yugoslav footballer

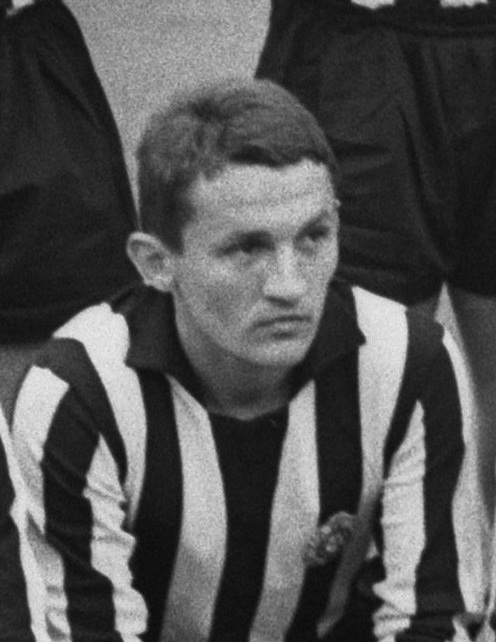
- Bečejac lining up for Partizan ahead of the 1966 European Cup final

Personal information
- Full name: Radoslav Bečejac
- Date of birth: 21 December 1941 (age 84)
- Place of birth: Žitište, German-occupied Serbia
- Height: 1.67 m (5 ft 6 in)
- Position: Midfielder

Senior career*
Years	Team	Apps	(Gls)
1959–1963	Proleter Zrenjanin	78	(24)
1963–1967	Partizan	88	(17)
1967–1972	Olimpija Ljubljana	109	(16)
1973	Santa Fe	6	(1)
Total		281	(58)

International career
1965–1970	Yugoslavia	12	(0)
- * Club domestic league appearances and goals

Radoslav Bečejac (Serbian Cyrillic: Радослав Бечејац; born 21 December 1941) is a Yugoslav former professional footballer who played as a midfielder.

== Club career ==
After starting out at Proleter Zrenjanin, Bečejac was transferred to Yugoslav First League club Partizan in 1963. He played four seasons with the Crno-beli and won the league title in 1964–65. In total, Bečejac amassed 88 appearances and scored 17 goals in the top flight. He was also a regular member of the team that reached the 1966 European Cup final, narrowly losing to Real Madrid.

In the summer of 1967, Bečejac was signed by Olimpija Ljubljana in a then Yugoslav record transfer of 65 million dinars. He spent five-and-a-half years with the Zmaji, making 109 league appearances and scoring 16 goals. In 1973, Bečejac moved abroad to Colombia and briefly played for Santa Fe before retiring.

== International career ==
At international level, Bečejac was capped 12 times for Yugoslavia, making his debut in a 1–1 home friendly draw with England in May 1965. His final cap came in April 1970, a 1–1 home friendly draw with Austria.

== Career statistics ==
=== Club ===
Appearances and goals by club, season and competition
Club	Season	League		
Club	Season	Division	Apps	Goals
Proleter Zrenjanin	1958–59	Yugoslav Second League	7	1
Proleter Zrenjanin	1959–60	Yugoslav Second League	22	2
Proleter Zrenjanin	1960–61	Vojvodina League		
Proleter Zrenjanin	1961–62	Yugoslav Second League	22	16
Proleter Zrenjanin	1962–63	Yugoslav Second League	27	5
Proleter Zrenjanin	Total		78	24
Partizan	1963–64	Yugoslav First League	14	2
Partizan	1964–65	Yugoslav First League	20	2
Partizan	1965–66	Yugoslav First League	27	6
Partizan	1966–67	Yugoslav First League	27	7
Partizan	Total		88	17
Olimpija Ljubljana	1967–68	Yugoslav First League	19	3
Olimpija Ljubljana	1968–69	Yugoslav First League	0	0
Olimpija Ljubljana	1969–70	Yugoslav First League	24	8
Olimpija Ljubljana	1970–71	Yugoslav First League	27	0
Olimpija Ljubljana	1971–72	Yugoslav First League	27	2
Olimpija Ljubljana	1972–73	Yugoslav First League	12	3
Olimpija Ljubljana	Total		109	16
Santa Fe	1973	Campeonato Profesional	6	1
Career total			281	58

=== International ===
Appearances and goals by national team and year
National team	Year	Apps	Goals
Yugoslavia	1965	3	0
Yugoslavia	1966	4	0
Yugoslavia	1967	4	0
Yugoslavia	1968	0	0
Yugoslavia	1969	0	0
Yugoslavia	1970	1	0
Total		12	0

== Honours ==
Partizan

- Yugoslav First League: 1964–65
