= List of FK Partizan records and statistics =

Fudbalski klub Partizan is a Serbian professional association football club based in Belgrade, Serbia, who currently play in the Serbian SuperLiga. They have played at their current home ground, Partizan Stadium, since 1949.

This list include the major honours won by Partizan, records set by the club, their managers and their players. The player records section includes details of the club's leading goalscorers and those who have made most appearances in first-team competitions. It also records notable achievements by Partizan players on the international stage.

The club's record appearance maker is Saša Ilić, who made 800 appearances. Stjepan Bobek is the club's record goalscorer, scoring 425 goals during his career in Partizan.

== Honours ==
=== Domestic ===
National Championships – 27

- Yugoslav First League

- Winners (11): 1946–47, 1948–49, 1960–61, 1961–62, 1962–63, 1964–65, 1975–76, 1977–78, 1982–83, 1985–86, 1986–87
- Runners-up (9): 1953–54, 1955–56, 1957–58, 1958–59, 1967–68, 1969–70, 1983–84, 1987–88, 1991–92

- FR Yugoslavia First League/Serbia and Montenegro First League

- Winners (8): 1992–93, 1993–94, 1995–96, 1996–97, 1998–99, 2001–02, 2002–03, 2004–05
- Runners-up (5): 1994–95, 1999–2000, 2000–01, 2003–04, 2005–06

- Serbian SuperLiga

- Winners (8): 2007–08, 2008–09, 2009–10, 2010–11, 2011–12, 2012–13, 2014–15, 2016–17
- Runners-up (8): 2006–07, 2013–14, 2015–16, 2017–18, 2019–20, 2020–21, 2021–22, 2023–24

National Cups – 16

- Yugoslav Cup

- Winners (6): 1947, 1952, 1953–54, 1956–57, 1988–89, 1991–92
- Runners-up (4): 1948, 1958–59, 1959–60, 1978–79

- FR Yugoslavia Cup/Serbia and Montenegro Cup

- Winners (3): 1993–94, 1997–98, 2000–01
- Runners-up (3): 1992–93, 1995–96, 1998–99

- Serbian Cup

- Winners (7): 2007–08, 2008–09, 2010–11, 2015–16, 2016–17, 2017–18, 2018–19
- Runners-up (4): 2014–15, 2019–20, 2020–21, 2021–22

National Super Cups – 1

- Yugoslav Super Cup

- Winners (1): 1989

=== European ===
- European Cup/UEFA Champions League

- Runners-up (1): 1965–66
- Quarter–finals (2): 1955–56, 1963–64
- Round of 16 (2): 1961–62, 1983–84
- Group stage (2): 2003–04, 2010–11

- UEFA Cup/UEFA Europa League

- Third round/Round of 16 (4): 1974–75, 1984–85, 1990–91, 2004–05
- Round of 32 (1): 2017–18

- European Cup Winners' Cup

- Quarter–finals (1): 1989–90
- Round of 16 (1): 1998–99

- UEFA Conference League

- Round of 16 (1): 2021-22
- Round of 32 (1): 2022–23

- Mitropa Cup

- Winner (1): 1978
- Semi-finals (2): 1956, 1959

Friendly Tournaments

- Trofeo Mohamed V (1): 1963
- Torneo Pentagonal Internacional de la Ciudad de México (1): 1970
- Torneo Pentagonal Internacional de la Ciudad de Bogotá (1): 1971
- Trofeo Colombino de fútbol (1): 1976
- Lunar New Year Cup (1): 1984
- 40th Anniversary FK Partizan (1): 1985
- Uhrencup (1): 1989

== Player records ==
=== Most appearances ===
As of 19 May 2019

Players with most appearances for FK Partizan
| No. | Name | Years | League | Cup | Europe | Other | Total |
|---|---|---|---|---|---|---|---|
| 1 | (Serbia) Saša Ilić | 1996–2005; 2010–2019 | 423 | 64 | 114 | 260 | 861 |
| 2 | (Socialist Federal Republic of Yugoslavia) Momčilo Vukotić | 1968–1978; 1979–1984 | 395 | 20 | 21 | 355 | 791 |
| 3 | (Socialist Federal Republic of Yugoslavia) Nikica Klinčarski | 1976–1985; 1987–1989 | 261 | 24 | 18 | 262 | 565 |
| 4 | (Socialist Federal Republic of Yugoslavia) Milan Damjanović | 1962–1971 | 214 | 13 | 9 | 301 | 537 |
| 5 | (Socialist Federal Republic of Yugoslavia) Blagoje Paunović | 1965–1975 | 252 | 14 | 16 | 232 | 514 |
| 6 | (Socialist Federal Republic of Yugoslavia) Ljubomir Mihajlović | 1961–1970 | 230 | 14 | 26 | 242 | 512 |
| 7 | (Socialist Federal Republic of Yugoslavia) Nenad Stojković | 1974–1984 | 245 | 18 | 10 | 219 | 492 |
| 8 | (Socialist Federal Republic of Yugoslavia) Vladimir Kovačević | 1959–1966; 1967–1970 | 215 | 22 | 24 | 226 | 487 |
| 9 | (Socialist Federal Republic of Yugoslavia) Vlada Pejović | 1967–1978 | 172 | 6 | 13 | 294 | 485 |
| 10 | (Socialist Federal Republic of Yugoslavia) Stjepan Bobek | 1945–1959 | 195 | 37 | 5 | 241 | 478 |

=== Top goalscorers ===
All matches

Top goalscorers for FK Partizan
| No. | Name | Years | League | Cup | Europe | Other | Total |
|---|---|---|---|---|---|---|---|
| 1 | (Socialist Federal Republic of Yugoslavia) Stjepan Bobek | 1945–1959 | 118 | 48 | 1 | 258 | 425 |
| 2 | (Socialist Federal Republic of Yugoslavia) Marko Valok | 1947–1959 | 97 | 35 | 2 | 277 | 411 |
| 3 | (Socialist Federal Republic of Yugoslavia) Mustafa Hasanagić | 1962–1969 | 112 | 8 | 9 | 226 | 355 |
| 4 | (Socialist Federal Republic of Yugoslavia) Momčilo Vukotić | 1968–1978; 1979–1984 | 114 | 2 | 8 | 215 | 339 |
| 5 | (Socialist Federal Republic of Yugoslavia) Vladimir Kovačević | 1959–1966; 1967–1970 | 112 | 14 | 13 | 180 | 319 |
| 6 | (Serbia) Saša Ilić | 1996–2005; 2010–2019 | 126 | 18 | 15 | 84 | 243 |
| 7 | (Socialist Federal Republic of Yugoslavia) Miloš Milutinović | 1952–1958 | 53 | 10 | 8 | 160 | 231 |
| 8 | (Socialist Federal Republic of Yugoslavia) Prvoslav Mihajlović | 1945–1950; 1951–1957 | 64 | 13 | 1 | 120 | 198 |
| 9 | (Socialist Federal Republic of Yugoslavia) Nenad Bjeković | 1969–1976 | 82 | 4 | 2 | 109 | 197 |
| 10 | (Federal Republic of Yugoslavia) Savo Milošević | 1992–1995 | 67 | 14 | 0 | 110 | 191 |

== Individual awards ==
=== Domestic ===
Yugoslavian First League top scorers

| Season | Name | Goals |
|---|---|---|
| 1950 | (Socialist Federal Republic of Yugoslavia) Marko Valok | 17 |
| 1953–54 | (Socialist Federal Republic of Yugoslavia) Stjepan Bobek | 21 |
| 1966–67 | (Socialist Federal Republic of Yugoslavia) Mustafa Hasanagić | 18 |
| 1974–75 | (Socialist Federal Republic of Yugoslavia) Boško Đorđević | 20 |
| 1975–76 | (Socialist Federal Republic of Yugoslavia) Nenad Bjeković | 24 |

FR Yugoslavia First League top scorers/Serbia and Montenegro top scorers

| Season | Name | Goals |
|---|---|---|
| 1993–94 | (Serbia and Montenegro) Savo Milošević | 21 |
| 1994–95 | (Serbia and Montenegro) Savo Milošević | 30 |
| 1999–00 | (Serbia and Montenegro) Mateja Kežman | 27 |
| 2002–03 | (Serbia and Montenegro) Zvonimir Vukić | 22 |
| 2005–06 | (Serbia and Montenegro) Srđan Radonjić | 20 |

Serbian SuperLiga top scorers

| Season | Name | Goals |
|---|---|---|
| 2008–09 | (Senegal) Lamine Diarra | 19 |
| 2010–11 | (Serbia) Ivica Iliev | 13 |
| 2016–17 | (Serbia) Uroš Đurđević (Brazil) Leonardo | 24 |
| 2021–22 | (Cape Verde) Ricardo Gomes | 29 |
| 2022–23 | (Cape Verde) Ricardo Gomes | 19 |
| 2023–24 | (Brazil) Matheus Saldanha | 17 |

Serbian SuperLiga Team of the Season

2008–09
(Montenegro) Mladen Božović, (Serbia) Ivan Stevanović, (Serbia) Nenad Đorđević, (Serbia) Ivan Obradović, (Serbia) Ljubomir Fejsa, (Serbia) Nemanja Tomić, (Portugal) Almami Moreira, (Senegal) Lamine Diarra
2009–10
(Serbia) Mladen Krstajić, (Serbia) Marko Lomić, (Serbia) Ljubomir Fejsa, (Serbia) Radosav Petrović, (Portugal) Almami Moreira
2010–11
(Montenegro) Stefan Savić, (Serbia) Stefan Babović, (Serbia) Radosav Petrović, (Serbia) Ivica Iliev
2011–12
(Sierra Leone) Medo Kamara, (Serbia) Zvonimir Vukić, (Serbia) Stefan Babović, (Serbia) Lazar Marković
2012–13
(Serbia) Vladimir Stojković, (Bulgaria) Ivan Ivanov, (Serbia) Saša Ilić, (Serbia) Lazar Marković, (Serbia) Aleksandar Mitrović
2013–14
(Serbia) Milan Lukač, (Serbia) Miroslav Vulićević, (Montenegro) Nikola Drinčić
2014–15
(Serbia) Stefan Babović, (Montenegro) Nikola Drinčić
2015–16
(Serbia) Nemanja Mihajlović
2016–17
(Serbia) Miroslav Vulićević, (Serbia) Bojan Ostojić, (Brazil) Everton Luiz, (Serbia) Uroš Đurđević, (Brazil) Leonardo
2017–18
(Serbia) Vladimir Stojković, (Serbia) Nemanja Miletić, (Serbia) Danilo Pantić

2018–19
(Serbia) Nemanja Miletić
2022–23
(Cape Verde) Ricardo Gomes
2023–24
(Serbia) Aleksandar Jovanović, (Brazil) Matheus Saldanha
2025–26
(Serbia) Nikola Simić

Yugoslav Footballer of the Year (Socialist Federal Republic of Yugoslavia)

- Nenad Stojković (1978)

Sportsperson of the Year in Yugoslavia (Socialist Federal Republic of Yugoslavia)

- Milan Galić (1962)

Sportske novosti Yellow Shirt award

- (Socialist Federal Republic of Yugoslavia) Stjepan Bobek (1954)
- (Socialist Federal Republic of Yugoslavia) Milutin Šoškić (1961)
- (Socialist Federal Republic of Yugoslavia) Vladica Kovačević (1963)
- (Socialist Federal Republic of Yugoslavia) Vladica Kovačević (1965)
- (Socialist Federal Republic of Yugoslavia) Nenad Stojković (1978)
- (Socialist Federal Republic of Yugoslavia) Dragan Mance (1983)

Young Sportsperson of the Year in Serbia and Montenegro

- Simon Vukčević (2004)

Serbian Footballer of the Year (Serbia)

- Predrag Mijatović (1992)
- Mateja Kežman (2000)
- Vladimir Stojković (2017)

Serbian SuperLiga Footballer of the Year

- (Guinea-Bissau) Almami Moreira (2009)
- (Serbia) Uroš Đurđević (2017)

==== International ====
FIFA World Cup Silver Boot

- (Socialist Federal Republic of Yugoslavia) Milan Galić (1962)

UEFA European Football Championship Top scorer

| Season | Name | Goals |
|---|---|---|
| 1960 | (Socialist Federal Republic of Yugoslavia) Milan Galić | 2 |

UEFA European Football Championship Teams of the Tournament

- (Socialist Federal Republic of Yugoslavia) Milan Galić (1960)

European Cup and UEFA Champions League top scorers

| Season | Name | Goals |
|---|---|---|
| 1955–56 | (Socialist Federal Republic of Yugoslavia) Miloš Milutinović | 8 |
| 1963–64 | (Socialist Federal Republic of Yugoslavia) Vladica Kovačević | 7 |

Ballon d'Or candidates

- (Socialist Federal Republic of Yugoslavia) Miloš Milutinović (1957) 14th place
- (Socialist Federal Republic of Yugoslavia) Milan Galić (1962) 8th place
- (Socialist Federal Republic of Yugoslavia) Milan Galić (1965) 17th place

==== FK Partizan Player of the Year ====
Partizan's Player of the Year is a poll on the club's website, that is being held at the end of the year and fans vote for FK Partizan best player in the year. He was held from 2002 to 2013.

| Year | Winner |
|---|---|
| 2002 | (Serbia and Montenegro) Zvonimir Vukić |
| 2003 | (Serbia and Montenegro) Igor Duljaj |
| 2004 | (Serbia and Montenegro) Simon Vukčević |
| 2005 | (Serbia and Montenegro) Albert Nađ |
| 2006 | (Montenegro) Ivica Kralj |
| 2007 | (Montenegro) Stevan Jovetić |

| Year | Winner |
|---|---|
| 2008 | (Portugal) Almami Moreira |
| 2009 | Did not vote |
| 2010 | (Brazil) Cléo |
| 2011 | (Serbia) Lazar Marković |
| 2012 | (Bulgaria) Ivan Ivanov |
| 2013 | (Serbia) Vladimir Stojković |

==== The Best Eleven ====
In 1995, Partizan celebrated half a century of its existence. Partizanov vesnik, official fan magazine, organized a massive poll in order to choose the best player and the best team in club's history, called Magnificent Eleven. The players chosen in the poll were:

Goalkeeper

- (Socialist Federal Republic of Yugoslavia) Milutin Šoškić (5.910 votes)

Defenders

- (Socialist Federal Republic of Yugoslavia) Bruno Belin (5.958)
- (Socialist Federal Republic of Yugoslavia) Velibor Vasović (5.496)
- (Socialist Federal Republic of Yugoslavia) Branko Zebec (5.218)
- (Socialist Federal Republic of Yugoslavia) Fahrudin Jusufi (4.300)

Midfielders

- (Socialist Federal Republic of Yugoslavia) Zlatko Čajkovski (5.244)
- (Socialist Federal Republic of Yugoslavia) / (Federal Republic of Yugoslavia) Predrag Mijatović (4.946)
- (Socialist Federal Republic of Yugoslavia) Miloš Milutinović (4.728)
- (Socialist Federal Republic of Yugoslavia) Momčilo Vukotić (4.558)

Forwards

- (Socialist Federal Republic of Yugoslavia) Stjepan Bobek (6.272)
- (Socialist Federal Republic of Yugoslavia) Milan Galić (5.058)

=== Players that participated on international tournaments while playing for Partizan ===
==== FIFA World Cup ====
- (Brazil) 1950 FIFA World Cup 5th place
  - (Socialist Federal Republic of Yugoslavia) Aleksandar Atanacković
  - (Socialist Federal Republic of Yugoslavia) Stjepan Bobek
  - (Socialist Federal Republic of Yugoslavia) Zlatko Čajkovski
  - (Socialist Federal Republic of Yugoslavia) Ratko Čolić
  - (Socialist Federal Republic of Yugoslavia) Vladimir Firm
  - (Socialist Federal Republic of Yugoslavia) Miodrag Jovanović
  - (Socialist Federal Republic of Yugoslavia) Prvoslav Mihajlović
- (Switzerland) 1954 FIFA World Cup 8th place
  - (Socialist Federal Republic of Yugoslavia) Zlatko Čajkovski
  - (Socialist Federal Republic of Yugoslavia) Stjepan Bobek (Captain)
  - (Socialist Federal Republic of Yugoslavia) Branko Zebec
  - (Socialist Federal Republic of Yugoslavia) Bruno Belin
  - (Socialist Federal Republic of Yugoslavia) Miloš Milutinović
- (Chile) 1962 FIFA World Cup 4th place
  - (Socialist Federal Republic of Yugoslavia) Milutin Šoškić
  - (Socialist Federal Republic of Yugoslavia) Fahrudin Jusufi
  - (Socialist Federal Republic of Yugoslavia) Milan Galić (Captain)
  - (Socialist Federal Republic of Yugoslavia) Vladica Kovačević
- (Spain) 1982 FIFA World Cup 16th place
  - (Socialist Federal Republic of Yugoslavia) Nenad Stojković
  - (Socialist Federal Republic of Yugoslavia) Zvonko Živković
- (Italy) 1990 FIFA World Cup 5th place
  - (Socialist Federal Republic of Yugoslavia) Vujadin Stanojković
  - (Socialist Federal Republic of Yugoslavia) Predrag Spasić
  - (Socialist Federal Republic of Yugoslavia) Fahrudin Omerović
- (France) 1998 FIFA World Cup 10th place
  - (Federal Republic of Yugoslavia) Ivica Kralj
- (Germany) 2006 FIFA World Cup 32nd place
  - (Serbia and Montenegro) Nenad Đorđević
  - (Serbia and Montenegro) Albert Nađ
- (South Africa) 2010 FIFA World Cup 23rd place
  - (Serbia) Radosav Petrović
- (Russia) 2018 FIFA World Cup 23rd place
  - (Serbia) Vladimir Stojković
- (United States) (Canada) (Mexico) 2026 FIFA World Cup
  - (Bosnia and Herzegovina) Nihad Mujakić

==== UEFA Euro ====
- (France) 1960 European Nations' Cup Silver
  - (Socialist Federal Republic of Yugoslavia) Milutin Šoškić
  - (Socialist Federal Republic of Yugoslavia) Fahrudin Jusufi
  - (Socialist Federal Republic of Yugoslavia) Jovan Miladinović
  - (Socialist Federal Republic of Yugoslavia) Milan Galić
- (Italy) UEFA Euro 1968 Silver
  - (Socialist Federal Republic of Yugoslavia) Milan Damjanović
  - (Socialist Federal Republic of Yugoslavia) Borivoje Đorđević
  - (Socialist Federal Republic of Yugoslavia) Blagoje Paunović
  - (Socialist Federal Republic of Yugoslavia) Ljubomir Mihajlović
  - (Socialist Federal Republic of Yugoslavia) Idriz Hošić
- (Socialist Federal Republic of Yugoslavia) UEFA Euro 1976 4th place
  - (Socialist Federal Republic of Yugoslavia) Momčilo Vukotić
- (France) UEFA Euro 1984 8th place
  - (Socialist Federal Republic of Yugoslavia) Nenad Stojković
  - (Socialist Federal Republic of Yugoslavia) Ljubomir Radanović
- (Belgium) (Netherlands) UEFA Euro 2000 8th place
  - (Federal Republic of Yugoslavia) Mateja Kežman
- (European Union) UEFA Euro 2020 20th place
  - (Hungary) Filip Holender

==== Summer Olympics ====
- (United Kingdom) Football at the 1948 Summer Olympics Silver
  - (Socialist Federal Republic of Yugoslavia) Aleksandar Atanacković
  - (Socialist Federal Republic of Yugoslavia) Stjepan Bobek
  - (Socialist Federal Republic of Yugoslavia) Miroslav Brozović
  - (Socialist Federal Republic of Yugoslavia) Zlatko Čajkovski
  - (Socialist Federal Republic of Yugoslavia) Miodrag Jovanović
  - (Socialist Federal Republic of Yugoslavia) Prvoslav Mihajlović
  - (Socialist Federal Republic of Yugoslavia) Franjo Šoštarić
  - (Socialist Federal Republic of Yugoslavia) Béla Pálfi
- (Finland) Football at the 1952 Summer Olympics Silver
  - (Socialist Federal Republic of Yugoslavia) Stjepan Bobek
  - (Socialist Federal Republic of Yugoslavia) Zlatko Čajkovski
  - (Socialist Federal Republic of Yugoslavia) Ratko Čolić
  - (Socialist Federal Republic of Yugoslavia) Branko Zebec
- (Italy) Football at the 1960 Summer Olympics Gold
  - (Socialist Federal Republic of Yugoslavia) Milan Galić
  - (Socialist Federal Republic of Yugoslavia) Fahrudin Jusufi
  - (Socialist Federal Republic of Yugoslavia) Velimir Sombolac
  - (Socialist Federal Republic of Yugoslavia) Milutin Šoškić
- (Italy) Football at the 1964 Summer Olympics 6th place
  - (Socialist Federal Republic of Yugoslavia) Jovan Miladinović
  - (Socialist Federal Republic of Yugoslavia) Lazar Radović
  - (Socialist Federal Republic of Yugoslavia) Velimir Sombolac
  - (Socialist Federal Republic of Yugoslavia) Milutin Šoškić
- (Soviet Union) Football at the 1980 Summer Olympics 4th place
  - (Socialist Federal Republic of Yugoslavia) Nikica Klinčarski
- (United States) Football at the 1984 Summer Olympics Bronze
  - (Socialist Federal Republic of Yugoslavia) Ljubomir Radanović
  - (Socialist Federal Republic of Yugoslavia) Admir Smajić
- (South Korea) Football at the 1988 Summer Olympics 10th place
  - (Socialist Federal Republic of Yugoslavia) Predrag Spasić
  - (Socialist Federal Republic of Yugoslavia) Dragoljub Brnović
  - (Socialist Federal Republic of Yugoslavia) Vladislav Đukić
- (South Korea) Football at the 1988 Summer Olympics 14th place (China ranking)
  - (China) Jia Xiuquan
  - (China) Liu Haiguang
- (Greece) Football at the 2004 Summer Olympics 16th place
  - (Serbia and Montenegro) Simon Vukčević
  - (Serbia and Montenegro) Branimir Petrović
  - (Serbia and Montenegro) Srđan Radonjić
- (China) Football at the 2008 Summer Olympics 12th place
  - (Serbia) Marko Jovanović
  - (Serbia) Ljubomir Fejsa
  - (Serbia) Zoran Tošić

=== Hat-tricks ===
==== Hat-tricks in European competitions ====
| N | Date | Player | Match | Score |
|---|---|---|---|---|
| 1 | 12 October 1955 | (Socialist Federal Republic of Yugoslavia) Miloš Milutinović^{4} | Partizan – (Portugal) Sporting CP | 5–2 |
| 2 | 27 November 1963 | (Socialist Federal Republic of Yugoslavia) Vladica Kovačević^{4} | Partizan – (Luxembourg) Jeunesse Esch | 6–2 |
| 3 | 27 September 1967 | (Socialist Federal Republic of Yugoslavia) Mustafa Hasanagić | Partizan – (Bulgaria) Lokomotiv Plovdiv | 5–1 |
| 4 | 2 October 1985 | (Socialist Federal Republic of Yugoslavia) Nebojša Vučićević | Partizan – (Portugal) Portimonense | 4–0 |
| 5 | 24 August 2000 | (Serbia and Montenegro) Saša Ilić | Partizan – (Malta) Sliema Wanderers | 4–1 |
| 6 | 19 July 2007 | (Senegal) Lamine Diarra | (Bosnia and Herzegovina) Zrinjski Mostar – Partizan | 1–6 |
| 7 | 2 August 2007 | (Montenegro) Stevan Jovetić | Partizan – (Bosnia and Herzegovina) Zrinjski Mostar | 5–0 |
| 8 | 21 July 2009 | (Brazil) Cléo | Partizan – (Wales) Rhyl | 8–0 |
| 9 | 31 July 2025 | (Serbia) Jovan Milošević | Partizan – (Ukraine) Oleksandriya | 4–0 |

^{4} Player scored four goals

==== Hat-tricks in Yugoslav First League ====
| Date | Player | Match | Score |
|---|---|---|---|
| 18 May 1947 | (Socialist Federal Republic of Yugoslavia) Vladimir Firm | Partizan – Kvarner | 5–0 |
| 8 June 1947 | (Socialist Federal Republic of Yugoslavia) Stjepan Bobek^{8} | 14. Oktobar Niš – Partizan | 1–10 |
| 8 October 1947 | (Socialist Federal Republic of Yugoslavia) Prvoslav Mihajlović^{4} | Partizan – Ponziana Trieste | 5–0 |
| 27 March 1949 | (Socialist Federal Republic of Yugoslavia) Marko Valok | Partizan – Dinamo Zagreb | 3–1 |
| 23 April 1950 | (Socialist Federal Republic of Yugoslavia) Marko Valok | Budućnost – Partizan | 2–4 |
| 29 October 1950 | (Socialist Federal Republic of Yugoslavia) Marko Valok^{4} | Partizan – Budućnost | 10–0 |
| 17 June 1951 | (Socialist Federal Republic of Yugoslavia) Marko Valok | Partizan – Crvena zvezda | 6–1 |
| 6 April 1952 | (Socialist Federal Republic of Yugoslavia) Antun Herceg | Partizan – Mačva | 6–1 |
| 27 April 1952 | (Socialist Federal Republic of Yugoslavia) Stjepan Bobek | Rabotnički – Partizan | 0–8 |
| 19 October 1952 | (Socialist Federal Republic of Yugoslavia) Marko Valok^{4} | Partizan – Vardar | 9–2 |
| 26 October 1952 | (Socialist Federal Republic of Yugoslavia) Marko Valok | Partizan – BSK | 5–1 |
| 24 April 1953 | (Socialist Federal Republic of Yugoslavia) Todor Veselinović | Partizan – Spartak Subotica | 6–2 |
| 6 September 1953 | (Socialist Federal Republic of Yugoslavia) Stjepan Bobek | Partizan – Sarajevo | 4–1 |
| 1 November 1953 | (Socialist Federal Republic of Yugoslavia) Branko Zebec^{4} | Rabotnički – Partizan | 0–8 |
| 11 April 1954 | (Socialist Federal Republic of Yugoslavia) Stjepan Bobek^{4} | Partizan – Rabotnički | 8–0 |
| 11 April 1954 | (Socialist Federal Republic of Yugoslavia) Antun Herceg | Partizan – Rabotnički | 8–0 |
| 14 November 1954 | (Socialist Federal Republic of Yugoslavia) Stjepan Bobek | Partizan – Sarajevo | 3–0 |
| 26 March 1955 | (Socialist Federal Republic of Yugoslavia) Miloš Milutinović | Partizan – Radnički Beograd | 7–0 |
| 16 October 1955 | (Socialist Federal Republic of Yugoslavia) Miloš Milutinović | Dinamo Zagreb – Partizan | 2–4 |
| 14 December 1955 | (Socialist Federal Republic of Yugoslavia) Stjepan Bobek | Partizan – Proleter Osijek | 8–1 |
| 18 December 1955 | (Socialist Federal Republic of Yugoslavia) Antun Herceg | Sarajevo – Partizan | 0–4 |
| 11 March 1956 | (Socialist Federal Republic of Yugoslavia) Miloš Milutinović^{6} | Partizan – Budućnost | 9–0 |
| 5 August 1956 | (Socialist Federal Republic of Yugoslavia) Marko Valok^{5} | Partizan – BSK | 5–2 |
| 15 March 1958 | (Socialist Federal Republic of Yugoslavia) Branislav Mihajlović^{4} | Partizan – Hajduk Split | 5–1 |
| 12 September 1959 | (Socialist Federal Republic of Yugoslavia) Tomislav Kaloperović | Partizan – Velež | 3–3 |
| 9 April 1961 | (Socialist Federal Republic of Yugoslavia) Joakim Vislavski | Partizan – Velež | 3–0 |
| 11 June 1961 | (Socialist Federal Republic of Yugoslavia) Milan Galić | Radnički Beograd – Partizan | 2–4 |
| 17 September 1961 | (Socialist Federal Republic of Yugoslavia) Milan Vukelić | Borac Banja Luka – Partizan | 4–7 |
| 15 October 1961 | (Socialist Federal Republic of Yugoslavia) Vladica Kovačević | Partizan – Hajduk Split | 4–0 |
| 5 November 1961 | (Socialist Federal Republic of Yugoslavia) Vladica Kovačević | Sarajevo – Partizan | 3–3 |
| 23 September 1962 | (Socialist Federal Republic of Yugoslavia) Milan Galić | Partizan – Vojvodina | 4–3 |
| 28 October 1962 | (Socialist Federal Republic of Yugoslavia) Milan Galić | Crvena zvezda – Partizan | 0–5 |
| 25 November 1962 | (Socialist Federal Republic of Yugoslavia) Milan Galić | Partizan – Novi Sad | 5–1 |
| 9 December 1962 | (Socialist Federal Republic of Yugoslavia) Vladica Kovačević | Partizan – Hajduk Split | 4–1 |
| 10 March 1963 | (Socialist Federal Republic of Yugoslavia) Antun Rudinski | Partizan – Sloboda Tuzla | 4–0 |
| 8 September 1963 | (Socialist Federal Republic of Yugoslavia) Vladica Kovačević | Rijeka – Partizan | 2–4 |
| 10 November 1963 | (Socialist Federal Republic of Yugoslavia) Vladica Kovačević^{4} | Partizan – Trešnjevka | 7–0 |
| 6 June 1965 | (Socialist Federal Republic of Yugoslavia) Milan Galić | Sarajevo – Partizan | 4–5 |
| 11 December 1966 | (Socialist Federal Republic of Yugoslavia) Mustafa Hasanagić | Partizan – Zagreb | 7–0 |
| 25 June 1967 | (Socialist Federal Republic of Yugoslavia) Mustafa Hasanagić | Partizan – Olimpija | 4–1 |
| 17 May 1970 | (Socialist Federal Republic of Yugoslavia) Nenad Bjeković | Partizan – Bor | 3–1 |
| 13 September 1970 | (Socialist Federal Republic of Yugoslavia) Momčilo Vukotić | Partizan – Crvenka | 4–0 |
| 4 March 1973 | (Socialist Federal Republic of Yugoslavia) Momčilo Vukotić | Partizan – Sutjeska Nikšić | 3–1 |
| 24 February 1974 | (Socialist Federal Republic of Yugoslavia) Nenad Bjeković^{4} | Partizan – Sarajevo | 4–0 |
| 27 June 1976 | (Socialist Federal Republic of Yugoslavia) Nenad Bjeković | Partizan – Vojvodina | 5–2 |
| 11 September 1976 | (Socialist Federal Republic of Yugoslavia) Pavle Grubješić | Partizan – OFK Beograd | 3–2 |
| 23 October 1976 | (Socialist Federal Republic of Yugoslavia) Pavle Grubješić | Partizan – Željezničar | 4–0 |
| 17 June 1979 | (Socialist Federal Republic of Yugoslavia) Slobodan Santrač | Partizan – Budućnost | 4–2 |
| 26 September 1981 | (Socialist Federal Republic of Yugoslavia) Zvonko Varga | Partizan – Velež | 4–1 |
| 25 April 1982 | (Socialist Federal Republic of Yugoslavia) Momčilo Vukotić | Partizan – Sloboda Tuzla | 7–2 |
| 5 September 1982 | (Socialist Federal Republic of Yugoslavia) Dragan Mance | Partizan – Vojvodina | 5–0 |
| 5 May 1985 | (Socialist Federal Republic of Yugoslavia) Dragan Mance | Iskra Bugojno – Partizan | 1–3 |
| 28 May 1986 | (Socialist Federal Republic of Yugoslavia) Zvonko Živković | Dinamo Vinkovci – Partizan | 1–4 |
| 3 March 1987 | (Socialist Federal Republic of Yugoslavia) Milko Đurovski | Partizan – Sloboda Tuzla | 3–0 |
| 10 April 1988 | (Socialist Federal Republic of Yugoslavia) Milko Đurovski^{4} | Partizan – Rad | 5–1 |
| 29 May 1988 | (Socialist Federal Republic of Yugoslavia) Vladislav Đukić | Partizan – Sloboda Tuzla | 5–2 |
| 26 March 1989 | (Socialist Federal Republic of Yugoslavia) Nebojša Vučićević | Partizan – Napredak Kruševac | 4–2 |
| 13 May 1990 | (Socialist Federal Republic of Yugoslavia) Milko Đurovski | Partizan – Velež | 3–0 |

^{8} Player scored eight goals ^{4} Player scored four goals ^{6} Player scored six goals

==== Hat-tricks in First League of Serbia and Montenegro (until February 2003 Federal Republic of Yugoslavia) ====
| Date | Player | Match | Score |
|---|---|---|---|
| 24 August 2002 | (Federal Republic of Yugoslavia) Saša Ilić | Partizan – Radnički Niš | 5–2 |
| 30 November 2002 | (Federal Republic of Yugoslavia) Zvonimir Vukić | Partizan – Zeta | 3–1 |
| 5 April 2003 | (Serbia and Montenegro) Zvonimir Vukić | Sartid – Partizan | 1–4 |
| 12 April 2003 | (Serbia and Montenegro) Damir Čakar | Partizan – Mogren | 4–1 |
| 7 May 2003 | (Serbia and Montenegro) Zvonimir Vukić | Partizan – Vojvodina | 4–0 |
| 8 August 2004 | (Serbia and Montenegro) Saša Ilić | Sutjeska – Partizan | 1–4 |
| 29 August 2004 | (Serbia and Montenegro) Srđan Radonjić | Smederevo – Partizan | 1–3 |
| 21 May 2005 | (Serbia and Montenegro) Nikola Grubješić | Partizan – Hajduk Beograd | 7–0 |
| 18 February 2006 | (Serbia and Montenegro) Srđan Radonjić | Partizan – Javor Ivanjica | 6–0 |

==== Hat-tricks in Serbian SuperLiga ====
| N | Date | Player | Match | Score |
|---|---|---|---|---|
| 1 | 5 August 2006 | (Nigeria) Obiora Odita | Bežanija – Partizan | 3–4 |
| 2 | 23 November 2008 | (Senegal) Lamine Diarra | Partizan – OFK Beograd | 5–1 |
| 3 | 15 August 2009 | (Senegal) Lamine Diarra | Partizan – Borac Čačak | 5–0 |
| 4 | 16 May 2010 | (Senegal) Lamine Diarra | Partizan – Mladi Radnik | 6–0 |
| 5 | 3 May 2014 | (Serbia) Nemanja Kojić | Donji Srem – Partizan | 0–5 |
| 6 | 9 November 2014 | (Serbia) Petar Škuletić | Spartak Subotica – Partizan | 0–3 |
| 7 | 11 December 2016 | (Serbia) Uroš Đurđević | Čukarički – Partizan | 1–3 |
| 8 | 22 November 2019 | (Nigeria) Umar Sadiq | Partizan – Javor Ivanjica | 6–2 |
| 9 | 22 August 2020 | (Japan) Takuma Asano | Partizan – Inđija | 5–0 |
| 10 | 4 September 2022 | (Cape Verde) Ricardo Gomes | Kolubara – Partizan | 1–5 |
| 11 | 11 September 2022 | (Cape Verde) Ricardo Gomes | Partizan – Mladost Lučani | 6–0 |

==== Hat-tricks in Yugoslav Cup ====
| Date | Player | Match | Score |
|---|---|---|---|
| 16 October 1949 | (Socialist Federal Republic of Yugoslavia) Marko Valok | Partizan – Zagreb | 8–0 |
| 3 December 1950 | (Socialist Federal Republic of Yugoslavia) Stjepan Bobek | Partizan – Proleter Osijek | 5–1 |
| 11 November 1951 | (Socialist Federal Republic of Yugoslavia) Stjepan Bobek^{6} | Sloboda Titovo Užice – Partizan | 1–11 |
| 18 November 1951 | (Socialist Federal Republic of Yugoslavia) Stjepan Bobek^{8} | Partizan – Sloga Petrovac na Mlavi | 15–0 |
| 12 August 1953 | (Socialist Federal Republic of Yugoslavia) Stjepan Bobek | Mladost Svetozarevo – Partizan | 0–11 |
| 12 August 1953 | (Socialist Federal Republic of Yugoslavia) Bruno Belin | Mladost Svetozarevo – Partizan | 0–11 |
| 4 October 1953 | (Socialist Federal Republic of Yugoslavia) Miloš Milutinović | Partizan – Dinamo Zagreb | 5–5 |
| 8 August 1954 | (Socialist Federal Republic of Yugoslavia) Prvoslav Mihajlović | Dinamo Pančevo – Partizan | 2–7 |
| 18 August 1954 | (Socialist Federal Republic of Yugoslavia) Marko Valok^{5} | Partizan – Hajduk Beograd | 17–0 |
| 18 August 1954 | (Socialist Federal Republic of Yugoslavia) Zlatko Čajkovski^{4} | Partizan – Hajduk Beograd | 17–0 |
| 18 August 1954 | (Socialist Federal Republic of Yugoslavia) Stanoje Jocić^{4} | Partizan – Hajduk Beograd | 17–0 |
| 10 October 1954 | (Socialist Federal Republic of Yugoslavia) Stjepan Bobek^{5} | Partizan – RNK Split | 7–2 |
| 29 July 1956 | (Socialist Federal Republic of Yugoslavia) Mihalj Mesaroš | Partizan – Obilić | 6–0 |
| 1 February 1958 | (Socialist Federal Republic of Yugoslavia) Branislav Mihajlović^{4} | Partizan – Pobeda Prilep | 11–0 |
| 13 December 1959 | (Socialist Federal Republic of Yugoslavia) Milan Galić | Spartak Subotica – Partizan | 3–4 |
| 6 November 1963 | (Socialist Federal Republic of Yugoslavia) Vladica Kovačević | Radnički Kragujevac – Partizan | 0–8 |
| 22 April 1964 | (Socialist Federal Republic of Yugoslavia) Zvezdan Čebinac | Radnički Niš – Partizan | 2–7 |
| 30 August 1978 | (Socialist Federal Republic of Yugoslavia) Slobodan Santrač | Partizan – OFK Beograd | 5–1 |

^{4} Player scored four goals ^{5} Player scored five goals ^{6} Player scored six goals ^{8} Player scored eight goals

==== Hat-tricks in Serbian Cup ====
| Date | Player | Match | Score |
|---|---|---|---|
| 7 May 2008 | (Senegal) Lamine Diarra | Partizan – Zemun | 3–0 |
| 9 October 2019 | (Serbia) Đorđe Ivanović^{5} | Vodojaža – Partizan | 0–6 |

^{5} Player scored five goals

== Eternal Derby ==
- First goal – (Socialist Federal Republic of Yugoslavia) Stjepan Bobek (1st Eternal Derby, 5 January 1947)^{*}
- Top scorer – (Socialist Federal Republic of Yugoslavia) Marko Valok (13 goals)

== Managerial records ==
- First managers: Franjo Glaser, from October 1945 to November 1946.
- Longest-serving manager by time: Ljubiša Tumbaković, from July 1992 to June 1999 and from May 2000 to December 2002 (9 years).
- Longest-serving manager by matches:

== Cup finals ==
| Season | Opponent | Score | Venue | Scorers |
|---|---|---|---|---|
| 1946–47 | Naša Krila Zemun | 2–0 | Belgrade | Jezerkić, Simonovski |
| 1947–48 | Crvena zvezda | 0–3 | Belgrade | — |
| 1952 | Crvena zvezda | 6–0 | Belgrade | Valok, Zebec (2), Bobek, Veselinović |
| 1954 | Crvena zvezda | 4–1 | Belgrade | Valok (2), Mihajlović, Bobek |
| 1956–57 | Radnički Beograd | 5–3 | Belgrade | Valok, Mesaroš, Kaloperović, Milutinović, Zebec |
| 1958–59 | Crvena zvezda | 1–3 | Belgrade | Galić |
| 1959–60 | Dinamo Zagreb | 2–3 | Belgrade | Kaloperović, Kovačević |
| 1978–79 | Rijeka | 1–2 | Rijeka | Kozić |
| 1978–79 | Rijeka | 0–0 | Belgrade | — |
| 1988–89 | Velež Mostar | 6–1 | Belgrade | Vučićević (2), Milojević, Vokrri, Vermezović, Batrović |
| 1991–92 | Crvena zvezda | 1–0 | Belgrade | Vujačić |
| 1991–92 | Crvena zvezda | 2–2 | Belgrade | Mijatović, Jokanović |
| 1992–93 | Crvena zvezda | 1–0 | Belgrade | Zahovič |
| 1992–93 | Crvena zvezda | 0–1 (4–5 pen.) | Belgrade | — |
| 1993–94 | Spartak Subotica | 3–2 | Subotica | Čurović, Milošević, Ćirić |
| 1993–94 | Spartak Subotica | 6–1 | Belgrade | Milošević (3), Čurović (3) |
| 1995–96 | Crvena zvezda | 0–3 | Belgrade | — |
| 1995–96 | Crvena zvezda | 1–3 | Belgrade | Vukićević |
| 1997–98 | Obilić | 0–0 | Belgrade | — |
| 1997–98 | Obilić | 2–0 | Belgrade | Trenevski, Obradović |
| 1998–99 | Crvena zvezda | 2–4 | Belgrade | Rašović, Kežman |
| 2000–01 | Crvena zvezda | 1–0 | Belgrade | Ilić |
| 2007–08 | Zemun | 3–0 | Belgrade | Diarra (3) |
| 2008–09 | Sevojno | 3–0 | Belgrade | Đorđević, Stevanović, Petrović |
| 2010–11 | Vojvodina | 3–0^{1} | Belgrade | Tagoe, Vukić |
| 2014–15 | Čukarički | 0–1 | Belgrade | — |
| 2015–16 | Javor | 2–0 | Gornji Milanovac | Jovanović, Vlahović |
| 2016–17 | Crvena zvezda | 1–0 | Belgrade | Milenković |
| 2017–18 | Mladost Lučani | 2–1 | Surdulica | Janković, Zdjelar |
| 2018–19 | Crvena zvezda | 1–0 | Belgrade | Ostojić |
| 2019–20 | Vojvodina | 2–2 (2–4 pen.) | Niš | Stevanović, Pavlović |

^{1} The match was abandoned in the 83rd minute with Partizan leading 2–1 when Vojvodina walked off to protest the quality of the officiating. Originally, this was declared the final score and the Cup was awarded to Partizan, but on 16 May 2011, after further investigation from Serbian FA concerning the match, the result was officially registered as a 3–0 win to Partizan.

== Average attendance record ==
Yugoslav First League
| 1946–47 | 10,042 | — | Record 25,000 vs. Hajduk Split; Lowest 3,000 vs. Spartak Subotica & Ponziana Trieste* |
| 1947–48 | 15,667 | ▲ | Record 30,000 vs. Crvena zvezda Lowest 3,000 vs. Ponziana Trieste |
| 1948–49 | 22,800 | ▲ | Record 30,000 at four matches Lowest 5,000 vs. Ponziana Trieste |
| 1950 | 22,111 | ▼ | Record 45,000 vs. Crvena zvezda Lowest 6,000 vs. Budućnost |
| 1951 | 21,909 | ▼ | Record 50,000 vs. Crvena zvezda Lowest 8,000 vs. Borac Zagreb |
| 1951–52 | 16,375 | ▼ | Record 30,000 vs. Dinamo Zagreb; Lowest 3,000 vs. Vardar |
| 1952–53 | 21,819 | ▲ | Record 52,000 vs. Crvena zvezda Lowest 8,000 vs. Vojvodina & Velež |
| 1953–54 | 20,077 | ▼ | Record 55,000 vs. Crvena zvezda Lowest 8,000 vs. Spartak Subotica & Radnički Beograd |
| 1954–55 | 18,462 | ▼ | Record 50,000 vs. Crvena zvezda Lowest 3,000 vs. Vardar |
| 1955–56 | 18,847 | ▲ | Record 45,000 vs. Crvena zvezda Lowest 10,000 vs. Spartak Subotica & Vojvodina |
| 1956–57 | 15,231 | ▼ | Record 40,000 vs. Crvena zvezda Lowest 5,000 vs. Spartak Subotica |
| 1957–58 | 14,616 | ▼ | Record 35,000 vs. Crvena zvezda Lowest 4,000 vs. Vardar |
| 1958–59 | 19,182 | ▲ | Record 50,000 vs. Crvena zvezda Lowest 8,000 vs. Budućnost & Željezničar |
| 1959–60 | 20,000 | ▲ | Record 50,000 vs. Crvena zvezda Lowest 3,000 vs. Sloboda Tuzla |
| 1960–61 | 26,337 | ▲ | Record 52,700 vs. Crvena zvezda Lowest 8,000 vs. Sarajevo |
| 1961–62 | 25,090 | ▼ | Record 55,000 vs. Crvena zvezda Lowest 10,000 vs. Novi Sad |
| 1962–63 | 21,769 | ▼ | Record 50,000 vs. Crvena zvezda Lowest 6,000 vs. Sarajevo |
| 1963–64 | 20,384 | ▼ | Record 50,000 vs. Crvena zvezda Lowest 6,000 vs. Sarajevo & Novi Sad |
| 1964–65 | 24,071 | ▲ | Record 60,000 vs. Crvena zvezda Lowest 10,000 vs. Trešnjevka |
| 1965–66 | 14,933 | ▼ | Record 55,000 vs. Crvena zvezda Lowest 6,000 vs. Olimpija |
| 1966–67 | 19,067 | ▲ | Record 55,000 vs. Crvena zvezda Lowest 3,000 vs. Olimpija |
| 1967–68 | 18,000 | ▼ | Record 60,000* vs. Crvena zvezda Lowest 6,000 vs. Vardar |
| 1968–69 | 16,236 | ▼ | Record 50,000 vs. Crvena zvezda Lowest 1,000 vs. Olimpija |
| 1969–70 | 13,295 | ▼ | Record 55,000* vs. Crvena zvezda Lowest 1,000 vs. Zagreb |
| 1970–71 | 15,824 | ▲ | Record 50,000* vs. Crvena zvezda Lowest 5,000 vs. Borac Banja Luka |
| 1971–72 | 14,765 | ▼ | Record 53,000* vs. Crvena zvezda Lowest 2,000 vs. Sutjeska Nikšić |
| 1972–73 | 13,118 | ▼ | Record 50,000 vs. Crvena zvezda Lowest 3,000 vs. Vardar |
| 1973–74 | 11,852 | ▼ | Record 55,000 vs. Crvena zvezda Lowest 6,000 vs. Čelik Zenica |
| 1974–75 | 13,733 | ▲ | Record 48,464 vs. Crvena zvezda Lowest 2,000 vs. Dinamo Zagreb |
| 1975–76 | 22,209 | ▲ | Record 51,562 vs. Crvena zvezda Lowest 7,000 vs. Željezničar |
| 1976–77 | 19,750 | ▼ | Record 69,740* vs. Crvena zvezda Lowest 3,000 vs. Željezničar |
| 1977–78 | 30,530 | ▲ | Record 50,000 vs. Sarajevo & Hajduk Split; Lowest 10,000 vs. Budućnost |
| 1978–79 | 18,765 | ▼ | Record 50,000 vs. Hajduk Split; Lowest 2,000 vs. Radnički Niš |
| 1979–80 | 17,412 | ▼ | Record 50,000 vs. Crvena zvezda Lowest 2,000 vs. Čelik Zenica |
| 1980–81 | 19,000 | ▲ | Record 40,000 vs. Crvena zvezda Lowest 5,000 vs. Olimpija |
| 1981–82 | 19,765 | ▲ | Record 45,000 vs. Dinamo Zagreb; Lowest 6,000 vs. Sloboda Tuzla & Teteks |
| 1982–83 | 27,883 | ▲ | Record 90,000* vs. Dinamo Zagreb; Lowest 12,000 vs. Sloboda Tuzla & Vardar |
| 1983–84 | 20,412 | ▼ | Record 60,000* vs. Hajduk Split; Lowest 8,000 vs. Sloboda Tuzla & Sarajevo |
| 1984–85 | 15,589 | ▼ | Record 50,000 vs. Crvena zvezda Lowest 5,000 vs. Sloboda Tuzla |
| 1985–86 | 20,648 | ▲ | Record 50,000 vs. Crvena zvezda & Željezničar; Lowest 8,000 vs. Vardar & Sarajevo |
| 1986–87 | 23,824 | ▲ | Record 55,000 vs. Crvena zvezda Lowest 10,000 vs. Sutjeska Nikšić |
| 1987–88 | 15,118 | ▼ | Record 50,000 vs. Crvena zvezda Lowest 3,000 vs. Rijeka & Sarajevo |
| 1988–89 | 13,706 | ▼ | Record 50,000 vs. Crvena zvezda Lowest 3,000 vs. Spartak Subotica & Čelik Zenica |
| 1989–90 | 14,000 | ▲ | Record 45,000 vs. Crvena zvezda Lowest 3,000 vs. Borac Banja Luka |
| 1990–91 | 10,056 | ▼ | Record 50,000 vs. Crvena zvezda Lowest 3,000 vs. Radnički Niš |
| 1991–92 | 8,334 | ▼ | Record 20,000 vs. Zemun; Lowest 1,000 vs. Željezničar |

- Match against Ponziana was played in Ljubljana.
- Match against Crvena zvezda was played at Marakana.
- Match against Crvena zvezda was played at Marakana.
- Match against Dinamo Zagreb was played at Marakana.
- Match against Hajduk Split was played at Marakana.

== Individual records and statistics ==
- Most goals:
  - In all competitions – 425, (Socialist Federal Republic of Yugoslavia) Stjepan Bobek (1945–1959).
  - In league matches – 126, (Serbia) Saša Ilić (1996–2005, 2010–2019).
  - In European competitions – 20, (Cape Verde) Ricardo Gomes (2018–2019, 2021−).
- Most goals in one match:
  - In domestic league – 9, (Socialist Federal Republic of Yugoslavia) Stjepan Bobek (8 June 1947 v 14. Oktobar Niš).
  - In European competitions – 4, (Socialist Federal Republic of Yugoslavia) Miloš Milutinović, (12 October 1955 v (Portugal) Sporting CP); (Socialist Federal Republic of Yugoslavia) Vladica Kovačević (27 November 1963 v (Luxembourg) Jeunesse Esch).
- First goal:
  - Overall – (Socialist Federal Republic of Yugoslavia) Silvester Šereš (6 October 1945 v Zemun).
  - In Yugoslav First League – (Socialist Federal Republic of Yugoslavia) Florijan Matekalo (25 August 1946 v Pobeda Skopje).
  - In First League of FR Yugoslavia – (Federal Republic of Yugoslavia) Slaviša Jokanović (23 August 1992 v Zemun).
  - In Serbian SuperLiga – (Nigeria) Obiora Odita (5 August 2006 v Bežanija).
  - In Yugoslav Cup – (Socialist Federal Republic of Yugoslavia) Jovan Jezerkić (16 November 1947 v Proleter Priština).
  - In FR Yugoslavia Cup – (Federal Republic of Yugoslavia) Slobodan Krčmarević (16 August 1992 v Rudar Pljevlja).
  - In Serbian Cup – (Serbia) Marko Lomić (20 September 2006 v ČSK).

=== Landmark goals ===
==== Yugoslav First League ====
- 1000th – (Socialist Federal Republic of Yugoslavia) Mustafa Hasanagić (9 December 1965 v Vardar).
- 2000th – (Socialist Federal Republic of Yugoslavia) Milko Đurovski (3 March 1987 v Sloboda Tuzla).

==== First League of Serbia and Montenegro ====
- 1000th – (Cameroon) Pierre Boya (6 December 2003 v Budućnost Banatski Dvor).

=== Goalscoring records in Serbian SuperLiga ===
- Fastest goal – 10 seconds, (Serbia) Uroš Đurđević (11 December 2016 v Čukarički).
- Most hat-tricks – 3, (Senegal) Lamine Diarra.
- Fastest hat-trick – 18 minutes, (Serbia) Nemanja Kojić (3 May 2014 v Donji Srem).
- Scored in most consecutive matches – 6, (Serbia) Uroš Đurđević (2016–17).
- Youngest goalscorer – 16 years, 2 months and 5 days, (Serbia) Dušan Vlahović (2 April 2016 v Radnik Surdulica).
- Oldest goalscorer – 39 years, 10 months and 6 days, (Serbia) Saša Ilić (5 November 2017 v Mačva).

== Linglong Tire SuperLiga ==
=== Head-to-head with Linglong Tire SuperLiga teams ===
| Positive balance (more Wins) |
| Neutral balance (Wins = Losses) |
| Negative balance (more Losses) |

| Opponent | Played | Won | Drawn | Lost | For | Against | Diff |
|---|---|---|---|---|---|---|---|
| Crvena zvezda | 35 | 14 | 11 | 10 | 42 | 35 | +7 |
| Vojvodina | 33 | 15 | 6 | 12 | 43 | 36 | +7 |

==== Matches with Crvena zvezda in Serbian SuperLiga ====
| Season | Competition | Club | Home | Away | Aggregate |
|---|---|---|---|---|---|
| 2006–07 | Meridian SuperLiga | Crvena zvezda | 0–0 | 4–2 | 5–5 |
| 2006–07 | Meridian SuperLiga | Crvena zvezda | 1–2 | 0–1 | 5–5 |
| 2007–08 | Meridian SuperLiga | Crvena zvezda | 2–2 | 1–4 | 4–7 |
| 2007–08 | Meridian SuperLiga | Crvena zvezda | 1–1 | N/A | 4–7 |
| 2008–09 | Jelen SuperLiga | Crvena zvezda | 1–1 | 2–0 | 4–1 |
| 2008–09 | Jelen SuperLiga | Crvena zvezda | 2–0 | N/A | 4–1 |
| 2009–10 | Jelen SuperLiga | Crvena zvezda | 1–0 | 2–1 | 3–1 |
| 2010–11 | Jelen SuperLiga | Crvena zvezda | 1–0 | 1–0 | 2–0 |
| 2011–12 | Jelen SuperLiga | Crvena zvezda | 0–1 | 2–0 | 2–1 |
| 2012–13 | Jelen SuperLiga | Crvena zvezda | 1–0 | 2–3 | 3–3 |
| 2013–14 | Jelen SuperLiga | Crvena zvezda | 2–1 | 0–1 | 2–2 |
| 2014–15 | Jelen SuperLiga | Crvena zvezda | 1–0 | 0–0 | 1–0 |
| 2015–16 | Jelen SuperLiga | Crvena zvezda | 1–2 | 1–3 | 3–6 |
| 2015–16 | Jelen SuperLiga | Crvena zvezda | N/A | 1–1 | 3–6 |
| 2016–17 | Serbian SuperLiga | Crvena zvezda | 1–0 | 1–1 | 5–2 |
| 2016–17 | Serbian SuperLiga | Crvena zvezda | N/A | 3–1 | 5–2 |
| 2017–18 | Serbian SuperLiga | Crvena zvezda | 1–1 | 0–0 | 2–3 |
| 2017–18 | Serbian SuperLiga | Crvena zvezda | N/A | 1–2 | 2–3 |
| 2018–19 | Serbian SuperLiga | Crvena zvezda | 1–1 | 1–1 | 3–4 |
| 2018–19 | Serbian SuperLiga | Crvena zvezda | N/A | 1–2 | 3–4 |
| 2019–20 | Serbian SuperLiga | Crvena zvezda | 2–0 | 0–0 | 2–0 |

== Big Four ==
Big Four was name for the four most successful clubs in Socialist Federative Republic of Yugoslavia: Partizan, Crvena zvezda, Dinamo Zagreb, and Hajduk Split.

=== Head-to-head with Big Four teams in First Yugoslav League ===
| Positive balance (more Wins) |
| Negative balance (more Losses) |

| Opponent | Played | Won | Drawn | Lost | For | Against | Diff |
|---|---|---|---|---|---|---|---|
| Crvena zvezda | 90 | 23 | 26 | 41 | 125 | 144 | −19 |
| Dinamo Zagreb | 90 | 37 | 21 | 32 | 129 | 124 | +5 |
| Hajduk Split | 88 | 41 | 23 | 24 | 141 | 104 | +37 |

=== Head-to-head with Big Four teams in Yugoslav Cup ===
| Positive balance (more Wins) |
| Neutral balance (Wins = Losses) |
| Negative balance (more Losses) |

| Opponent | Played | Won | Drawn | Lost | For | Against | Diff |
|---|---|---|---|---|---|---|---|
| Crvena zvezda | 18 | 6 | 3 | 9 | 30 | 30 | 0 |
| Dinamo Zagreb | 10 | 3 | 4 | 3 | 20 | 25 | −5 |
| Hajduk Split | 5 | 4 | 0 | 1 | 16 | 6 | +10 |

== Records and statistics in European competitions ==
- First match: Partizan 3–3 Sporting, European Cup, first round, 4 September 1955.
- Record (home) win: 8–0 against Rhyl in the 2009–10 UEFA Champions League, 21 July 2009.
- Record (away) defeat: 0–6 against Dynamo Dresden in the 1970–71 Inter-Cities Fairs Cup, 30 September 1970.
- Record (home) defeat: 0–4 against Beşiktaş in the 2014–15 UEFA Europa League, 23 October 2014.
- Highest-scoring: 4–5 against Celtic in the 1989–90 European Cup Winners' Cup, 27 September 1989.
- Most league goals scored in a season: 22 in 14 games, during the 2009–10 season
- Most consecutive victories at home: 7 (from 2–0 against Dynamo Dresden in September 1978, to 4–0 against Portimonense in October 1984)
- Most consecutive defeats at home: 3 (from 1–3 against Arsenal in September 2010, to 0–3 against Shakhtar Donetsk in November 2010)
- Most consecutive away victories: 2 (from 1–0 against Pyunik in July 2010, to 2–1 against HJK in August 2010)
- Most consecutive away defeats: 6 (from 2–6 against Queens Park Rangers in October 1984, to 0–2 against Flamurtari in September 1987)
- Most consecutive undefeated home matches: 11 (from 1–1 against Porto in September 2003, to 0–0 against Artmedia Petržalka in August 2005)
- Most consecutive undefeated away matches: 7 (from 2–1 against AZ Alkmaar in November 2015, to 0–0 against KF Skënderbeu Korçë in October 2017)
- Most consecutive unbeatable home matches: 5 (in 2 sequence)
- Most consecutive unbeatable away matches: 17 (from 1–2 against Jeunesse Esch in November 1963, to 0–2 against Dynamo Berlin in October 1983)

== Club records ==
=== Matches ===
==== Firsts ====
- First match: Partizan 4–2 Zemun, a friendly match, 6 October 1945.
- First League match: Partizan 1–0 Pobeda Skopje, Yugoslav First League, 25 August 1946.
- First Cup match: Partizan 2–0 Proleter Priština, Yugoslav Cup, 3rd round, 16 November 1947.
- First European match: Partizan 3–3 Sporting, European Cup, first round, 4 September 1955.

==== Wins ====
- Record European win: 8–0 against Rhyl in the 2009–10 UEFA Champions League, 21 July 2009.
- Record league win: 10–0 against Borac Čačak in the 1996–97 First League of FR Yugoslavia, 27 October 1996.
- Record Cup win: 17–0 against Hajduk Beograd in the 1954 Yugoslav Cup, 18 August 1954
- Most league wins in a season: 31 wins from 36 games (during the 1992–93 season).
- Fewest league wins in a season: 9 wins from 34 games (during the 1978–79 and 1980–81 seasons).

==== Defeats ====
- Record defeat: 2–7 against Dinamo Zagreb in the 1963–64 Yugoslav First League, 20 May 1964.
- Record defeat at Partizan Stadium: 1–6 against Hajduk Split in the 1975–76 Yugoslav First League, 9 May 1976.
- Record-scoring defeat: 5–6 against Vojvodina in the 1997–98 First League of FR Yugoslavia, 29 November 1997.
- Record Cup defeat: 2–7 against Dinamo Zagreb in the 1963–64 Yugoslav First League, 20 May 1964.
- Most league defeats in a season: 12 in 34 games, during the 1979–80 season
- Fewest defeats in a season: 0 in 30 games, during the 2004–05 and 2009–10 season

=== Goals ===
- Most league goals scored in a season: 111 in 40 games, during the 1999–2000 season
- Fewest league goals scored in a season: 31 in 34 games, during the 1979–80 season
- Most league goals conceded in a season: 45 in 26 games, during the 1956–57 season
- Fewest league goals conceded in a season: 11 in 24 games, during the 1998–99 season

=== Points ===
- Most points in a season: 101 in 40 games, during the 1999–00 season

Two points for a win: 54 in 34 games, during the 1977–78 season
Three points for a win:

- Fewest points in a season: 29 in 34 games, during the 1978–79 season

Two points for a win:
Three points for a win:
