= 1955–56 FK Partizan season =

Partizan
1955–56 season
- President: Bogdan Vujošević
- Head coach: Aleksandar Tomašević
- Yugoslav First League: Runners-up
- European Cup: Quarter-finals

The 1955–56 season was the tenth season in FK Partizan's existence. This article shows player statistics and matches that the club played during the 1955–56 season.

== Players ==
=== Squad information ===
Note: Flags indicate national team as defined under FIFA eligibility rules; some limited exceptions apply. Players may hold more than one non-FIFA nationality.

No.	Pos.	Nation	Player
—	GK	YUG	Milutin Šoškić
—	GK	YUG	Slavko Stojanović
—	DF	YUG	Bruno Belin
—	DF	YUG	Ratko Čolić
—	DF	YUG	Fahrudin Jusufi
—	DF	YUG	Čedomir Lazarević
—	DF	YUG	Milorad Milutinović
—	DF	YUG	Miodrag Jovanović
—	MF	YUG	Ranko Borozan
—	MF	YUG	Antun Herceg

No.	Pos.	Nation	Player
—	MF	YUG	Tomislav Kaloperović
—	MF	YUG	Bozidar Pajević
—	MF	YUG	Branko Zebec
—	FW	YUG	Stjepan Bobek
—	FW	YUG	Stanoje Jocić
—	FW	YUG	Branislav Mihajlović
—	FW	YUG	Prvoslav Mihajlović
—	FW	YUG	Miloš Milutinović
—	FW	YUG	Marko Valok

== Friendlies ==
7 September 1955 Friendly	Red Star (France)	2–9	(Socialist Federal Republic of Yugoslavia) Partizan	Paris, France
			Milutinović; Valok; Mihajlović; Herceg	Attendance: 10,000

3 November 1955 Friendly	Partizan (Socialist Federal Republic of Yugoslavia)	1–2	(Soviet Union) Spartak Moscow	Belgrade
	Pajević 5'		Isayev 32', 58'	Stadium: JNA Stadium; Attendance: 30,000; Referee: Franz Meier

28 December 1955 Friendly	Partizan (Socialist Federal Republic of Yugoslavia)	4–1	(Austria) SC Wacker Viena	Amsterdam, Netherlands
	Bobek; Kaloperović; Hmeljina

1 January 1956 Friendly	Rot-Weiss Essen (West Germany)	2–2	(Socialist Federal Republic of Yugoslavia) Partizan	Essen, West Germany
			Kaloperović 65', 77'

4 January 1956 Friendly	GVAV-Rapiditas (Netherlands)	1–6	(Socialist Federal Republic of Yugoslavia) Partizan	Groningen, Netherlands
			Bobek; Mesaroš; Milutinović; Zebec	Attendance: 20,000

28 March 1956 Friendly	Netherlands	1–3	(Socialist Federal Republic of Yugoslavia) Partizan	Amsterdam, Netherlands
				Attendance: 60,000

31 March 1956 Friendly	1. FC Kaiserslautern (West Germany)	3–3	(Socialist Federal Republic of Yugoslavia) Partizan	Kaiserslautern, West Germany
			Milutinović; Mihajlović (pen.); Bobek

2 April 1956 Friendly	1. FC Saarbrücken (Saar Protectorate)	3–1	(Socialist Federal Republic of Yugoslavia) Partizan	Saarbrücken, Saar Protectorate

16 May 1956 Friendly	Partizan (Socialist Federal Republic of Yugoslavia)	4–2	(West Germany) 1. FC Köln	Belgrade

== Competitions ==
=== Yugoslav First League ===
Pos	Team	Pld	W	D	L	GF	GA	GR	Pts	Qualification or relegation
1	Red Star Belgrade (C)	26	16	8	2	62	29	2.138	40	Qualification for European Cup preliminary round
2	Partizan	26	14	7	5	65	35	1.857	35	
3	Radnički Beograd	26	13	5	8	54	45	1.200	31	
4	Dinamo Zagreb	26	12	4	10	42	47	0.894	28	
5	Vojvodina	26	9	9	8	57	41	1.390	27	

Source: rsssf.org
Rules for classification: 1st points; 2nd goal average
Cup not disputed this season.
(C) Champions

21 August 1955 1	Partizan	2–1	Zagreb	Belgrade
	Pajević 16'; Maček 59' (o.g.)			Stadium: JNA Stadium; Attendance: 16,000; Referee: Pavlić (Sarajevo)

28 August 1955 2	Budućnost Titograd	2–3	Partizan	Titograd
			Jocić 12'; Milutinović 34'; Pajević 62'	Attendance: 9,000

11 September 1955 3	Partizan	0–1	Crvena zvezda	Belgrade
			Šekularac 34'	Stadium: JNA Stadium; Attendance: 45,000

18 September 1955 4	Partizan	1–0	Hajduk Split	Belgrade
	Bobek 20'			Stadium: JNA Stadium; Attendance: 20,000; Referee: Nedelkovski

28 September 1955 5	Spartak Subotica	1–1	Partizan	Subotica
			Mihajlović 68' (pen.)	Attendance: 7,000

9 October 1955 6	Partizan	3–1	Željezničar	Belgrade
	Borozan 29'; Mihajlović 66' (pen.); Lazarević 89'			Stadium: JNA Stadium; Attendance: 15,000

16 October 1955 7	Dinamo Zagreb	2–4	Partizan	Zagreb
			Jocić 8'; Milutinović 21', 32', 85'	Attendance: 20,000

16 November 1955 8	Partizan	2–4	Radnički Beograd	Belgrade
	Bobek 52'; Diskić 54' (o.g.)			Stadium: JNA Stadium; Attendance: 15,000; Referee: Barjaktarević (Beograd)

20 November 1955 9	Velež	1–3	Partizan	Mostar
			Bobek 9'; Mihajlović 52', 59'	Attendance: 9,000

27 November 1955 10	Partizan	1–1	BSK	Belgrade
	Milutinović 87'			Stadium: JNA Stadium; Attendance: 22,000; Referee: Sreta Stefanović (Beograd)

4 December 1955 11	Vojvodina	1–2	Partizan	Novi Sad
			Jocić 60'; Valok 87'	Attendance: 10,000; Referee: Damjani

14 December 1955 12	Partizan	8–1	Proleter Osijek	Belgrade
	Bobek 5', 75', 90'; Jocić 11'; Herceg 29', 58'; Jarić 48' (o.g.); Mihajlović 53' (pen.)			Stadium: JNA Stadium; Attendance: 20,000; Referee: Šibalić (Subotica)

18 December 1955 13	Sarajevo	0–4	Partizan	Sarajevo
			Herceg 36', 51', 84'; Bobek 60'	Attendance: 12,000

4 March 1956 14	Zagreb	1–2	Partizan	Zagreb
			Zebec 66'; Milutinović 72'	Attendance: 15,000; Referee: Gvardijančić (Ljubljana)

11 March 1956 15	Partizan	9–0	Budućnost Titograd	Belgrade
	Milutinović 9', 32', 70', 73', 78', 82'; Mihajlović 30' (pen.); Kaloperović 39'; Jocić 67'			Stadium: JNA Stadium; Attendance: 12,000; Referee: Stanišić (Sarajevo)

18 March 1956 16	Crvena zvezda	1–3	Partizan	Belgrade
	Rudinski 7'		Borozan 28'; Kaloperović 62'; Popović 70' (o.g.)	Stadium: JNA Stadium; Attendance: 50,000

25 March 1956 17	Hajduk Split	1–2	Partizan	Split
			Valok 11'; Milutinović 21'	Stadium: Stadion Stari plac Attendance: 15,000; Referee: Gvardijančić

7 April 1956 18	Partizan	2–2	Spartak Subotica	Belgrade
	Kaloperović 53'; Valok 67'			Stadium: JNA Stadium; Attendance: 10,000; Referee: Erlih (Ljubljana)

15 April 1956 19	Željezničar	1–0	Partizan	Sarajevo
				Attendance: 16,000

6 May 1956 20	Partizan	0–0	Dinamo Zagreb	Belgrade
				Stadium: JNA Stadium; Attendance: 15,000

9 May 1956 21	Radnički Beograd	4–3	Partizan	Belgrade
			Jocić 8'; Kaloperović 16'; Bobek 35'	Attendance: 15,000; Referee: Mikulan (Zagreb)

13 May 1956 22	Partizan	2–2	Velež	Belgrade
	Lazarević 59'; Pajević 88'			Stadium: JNA Stadium; Attendance: 20,000; Referee: Petrić (Rijeka)

20 May 1956 23	BSK	1–1	Partizan	Belgrade
			Lazarević 88'	Stadium: JNA Stadium; Attendance: 18,000; Referee: Sreta Stefanović (Beograd)

27 May 1956 24	Partizan	0–3	Vojvodina	Belgrade
				Stadium: JNA Stadium; Attendance: 10,000

3 June 1956 25	Proleter Osijek	1–5	Partizan	Osijek
			Jocić 15', 54'; Valok 51', 80'; Mihajlović 27'	Attendance: 3,000; Referee: Kukanja (Murska Sobota)

9 June 1956 26	Partizan	2–2	Sarajevo	Belgrade
	Mihajlović 20'; Jocić 33'			Stadium: JNA Stadium; Attendance: 25,000

=== Yugoslav Cup ===
14 August 1955 Qualifying round	Novi Sad	1–0	Partizan	Novi Sad
				Stadium: Stadion Karađorđe; Attendance: 3,000

=== European Cup ===
==== First round ====
4 September 1955 First round 1st leg	Sporting CP (Portugal)	3–3	(Socialist Federal Republic of Yugoslavia) Partizan	Lisbon, Portugal
18:00 (CET)	Martins 14', 78'; Quim 65'	Report	Milutinović 45', 50'; Bobek 73'	Stadium: Estádio Nacional; Attendance: 30,000; Referee: Dean Harzic (France)

12 October 1955 First round 2nd leg	Partizan (Socialist Federal Republic of Yugoslavia)	5–2 (8 – 5 agg.)	(Portugal) Sporting CP	Belgrade, Yugoslavia
15:00 (CET)	Milutinović 8', 28', 64', 73'; Jocić 87'	Report	Brandão 49', 77'	Stadium: Partizan Stadium; Attendance: 20,000; Referee: György Dankó (Hungary)

==== Quarter-finals ====
25 December 1955 Quarter-finals 1st leg	Real Madrid (Spain)	4–0	(Socialist Federal Republic of Yugoslavia) Partizan	Madrid, Spain
	Castaño 12', 23'; Gento 36'; Di Stéfano 70'	Report		Stadium: Santiago Bernabéu Stadium; Attendance: 105,532; Referee: Dean Harzic (France)

29 January 1956 Quarter-finals 2nd leg	Partizan (Socialist Federal Republic of Yugoslavia)	3–0 (3 – 4 agg.)	(Spain) Real Madrid	Belgrade, Yugoslavia
	Milutinović 24', 87'; Mihajlović 46' (pen.)	Report		Stadium: Partizan Stadium; Attendance: 40,000; Referee: Josef Gulde (Switzerland)

=== Mitropa Cup ===
==== Quarter-finals ====
23 June 1956 First leg	Wacker Wien (Austria)	1–1	(Socialist Federal Republic of Yugoslavia) Partizan	Vienna, Austria
			Valok 46'	Stadium: Prater Stadium; Attendance: 20,000

1 July 1956 Second leg	Partizan (Socialist Federal Republic of Yugoslavia)	1–1 (2 – 2 agg.)	(Austria) Wacker Wien	Belgrade, Yugoslavia
	Jocić 88'			Stadium: JNA Stadium; Attendance: 20,000

3 July 1956 Play off	Partizan (Socialist Federal Republic of Yugoslavia)	4–0	(Austria) Wacker Wien	Belgrade, Yugoslavia
	Kaloperović 25', 40', 45'; Marković 43'			Stadium: JNA Stadium; Attendance: 8,000

==== Semi-finals ====
8 July 1956 First leg	Partizan (Socialist Federal Republic of Yugoslavia)	1–0	(Hungary) Vasas	Belgrade, Yugoslavia
	Valok 20'			Stadium: JNA Stadium; Attendance: 30,000

14 July 1956 Second leg	Vasas (Hungary)	6–1 (6 – 2 agg.)	(Socialist Federal Republic of Yugoslavia) Partizan	Budapest, Hungary
			Marković 31'	Stadium: Népstadion; Attendance: 90,000

== Statistics ==
=== Goalscorers ===
This includes all competitive matches.

Rank	Pos	Nat	Name	Yugoslav First League	European Cup	Yugoslav Cup	Total
1	FW	(Socialist Federal Republic of Yugoslavia)	Miloš Milutinović	13	8	0	21
2	FW	(Socialist Federal Republic of Yugoslavia)	Stanoje Jocić	9	1	0	10
3	FW	(Socialist Federal Republic of Yugoslavia)	Stjepan Bobek	8	1	0	9
3	MF	(Socialist Federal Republic of Yugoslavia)	Prvoslav Mihajlović	8	1	0	9
5	MF	(Socialist Federal Republic of Yugoslavia)	Antun Herceg	5	0	0	5
5	FW	(Socialist Federal Republic of Yugoslavia)	Marko Valok	5	0	0	5
7	MF	(Socialist Federal Republic of Yugoslavia)	Tomislav Kaloperović	4	0	0	4
7	own goals			4	0	0	4
9	DF	(Socialist Federal Republic of Yugoslavia)	Čedomir Lazarević	3	0	0	3
9	MF	(Socialist Federal Republic of Yugoslavia)	Bozidar Pajević	3	0	0	3
11	MF	(Socialist Federal Republic of Yugoslavia)	Ranko Borozan	2	0	0	2
12	MF	(Socialist Federal Republic of Yugoslavia)	Branko Zebec	1	0	0	1
TOTALS				65	11	0	76

=== Score overview ===
Win Draw Loss

Opposition	Home score	Away score	Aggregate
Crvena zvezda	0–1	3–1	3–2
Radnički Beograd	2–4	3–4	5–8
Dinamo Zagreb	0–0	4–2	4–2
Vojvodina	0–3	2–1	2–4
Sarajevo	2–2	4–0	6–2
Velež	2–2	3–1	5–3
Zagreb	2–1	2–1	4–2
Spartak Subotica	1–1	2–2	3–3
BSK	1–1	1–1	2–2
Budućnost Titograd	9–0	3–2	12–2
Hajduk Split	1–0	2–1	3–1
Željezničar	3–1	0–1	3–2
Proleter Osijek	8–1	5–1	13–2

== See also ==
- List of FK Partizan seasons
