= 1956–57 FK Partizan season =

Partizan
1956–57 season
- President: Đuro Lončarević
- Head coach: Kiril Simonovski (until January 1957); Florijan Matekalo
- Yugoslav First League: 4th
- Yugoslav Cup: Winners

The 1956–57 season was the 11th season in FK Partizan's existence. This article shows player statistics and matches that the club played during the 1956–57 season.

== Friendlies ==
22 December 1956 Friendly	Borussia Dortmund (West Germany)	1–4	(Socialist Federal Republic of Yugoslavia) Partizan	Dortmund, West Germany
	Preissler 37'		Mesaroš 26'; Borozan 28'; Valok 70'; Milutinović 79'	Attendance: 10,000

25 December 1956 Friendly	Borussia Neunkirchen (West Germany)	2–4	(Socialist Federal Republic of Yugoslavia) Partizan	Neunkirchen, West Germany
			Milutinović 1', 36', 57', 86'	Attendance: 7,000

26 December 1956 Friendly	Augsburg XI (West Germany)	2–3	(Socialist Federal Republic of Yugoslavia) Partizan	Augsburg, West Germany
			Milutinović 13', 26'; Herceg 33'

30 December 1956 Friendly	1. FC Nürnberg (West Germany)	1–1	(Socialist Federal Republic of Yugoslavia) Partizan	Nuremberg, West Germany

24 February 1957 Friendly	Partizan (Socialist Federal Republic of Yugoslavia)	7–0	(Poland) CWKS Warsaw	Belgrade
	Valok; Milutinović; Mesaroš; Kaloperović (pen.); Bobek			Stadium: JNA Stadium; Attendance: 18,000; Referee: Ž. Vlajić

21 April 1957 Friendly	Ferencváros (Hungary)	1–0	(Socialist Federal Republic of Yugoslavia) Partizan	Budapest, Hungary
	Kertész			Stadium: Ferenc Puskás Stadium (1953); Attendance: 45,000

22 April 1957 Friendly	MTK Budapest (Hungary)	2–2	(Socialist Federal Republic of Yugoslavia) Partizan	Budapest, Hungary
			Miladinović 17'; Mesaroš 71'

== Competitions ==
=== Yugoslav First League ===
Pos	Team	Pld	W	D	L	GF	GA	GR	Pts
2	Vojvodina	26	16	3	7	64	38	1.684	35
3	Hajduk Split	26	12	6	8	45	31	1.452	30
4	Partizan	26	10	6	10	51	45	1.133	26
5	Dinamo Zagreb	26	10	6	10	51	51	1.000	26
6	BSK Belgrade (Note: After this season, BSK Belgrade changed their name to OFK Belgrade, in an attempt to appeal to the rising numbers of fans in the younger generation.)	26	9	7	10	41	47	0.872	25

Source: rsssf.org
Rules for classification: 1st points; 2nd goal average
Notes:

5 August 1956 1	Partizan	5–2	BSK	Belgrade
	Valok 15', 18', 23', 69', 90'			Stadium: Stadion JNA; Attendance: 30,000; Referee: Barjaktarević (Beograd)

12 August 1956 2	Partizan	1–1	Hajduk Split	Belgrade
	Valok 7'			Stadium: Stadion JNA; Attendance: 10,000; Referee: Nedelkovski (Skopje)

19 August 1956 3	Velež	3–1	Partizan	Mostar
			Marković 68'	Stadium: Stadion pod Bijelim Brijegom; Attendance: 8,000; Referee: Damjani (Zagreb)

22 August 1956 4	Sarajevo	1–4	Partizan	Sarajevo
			Miloš Milutinović 24'; Milorad Milutinović 28'; Mihajlović 56'; Spasojević 76'	Attendance: 6,000; Referee: Erlih (Ljubljana)

26 August 1956 5	Partizan	1–2	Budućnost	Belgrade
	Spasojević 9'			Stadium: Stadion JNA; Attendance: 15,000; Referee: Ivanovski (Skopje)

2 September 1956 6	Dinamo Zagreb	4–3	Partizan	Zagreb
			Bobek 33'; Herceg 72'; Zebec 73'	Attendance: 20,000

20 September 1956 7	Partizan	2–3	Vardar	Belgrade
	Jocić 8'; Milutinović 12'			Stadium: Stadion JNA; Attendance: 10,000; Referee: Jovanović (Kragujevac)

7 October 1956 8	Radnički Beograd	3–1	Partizan	Belgrade
			Andrić 76'	Attendance: 10,000; Referee: Petrovski (Skopje)

10 October 1956 9	Partizan	2–0	Lokomotiva	Belgrade
	Bobek 40'; Mihajlović 57' (pen.)			Stadium: Stadion JNA; Attendance: 8,000; Referee: Botić (Valjevo)

14 October 1956 10	Crvena zvezda	2–0	Partizan	Belgrade
				Stadium: Stadion JNA; Attendance: 45,000

17 October 1956 11	Partizan	3–1	Spartak Subotica	Belgrade
	Pajević 7'; Valok 55'; Mihajlović 85' (pen.)			Stadium: Stadion JNA; Attendance: 5,000; Referee: Vunarić (Zagreb)

20 October 1956 12	Zagreb	0–0	Partizan	Zagreb
				Attendance: 12,000; Referee: Erlih (Ljubljana)

28 October 1956 13	Partizan	1–1	Vojvodina	Belgrade
	Bobek 52'			Stadium: Stadion JNA; Attendance: 20,000; Referee: Kranjc (Zagreb)

2 March 1957 14	BSK	1–3	Partizan	Belgrade
			Valok 60', 87'; Zebec 64'	Attendance: 15,000; Referee: Damjani (Zagreb)

10 March 1957 15	Hajduk Split	0–2	Partizan	Split
			Milutinović 37'; Zebec 41'	Stadium: Stadion Stari plac Attendance: 16,000; Referee: Mikulan (Zagreb)

20 March 1957 16	Partizan	7–1	Velež	Belgrade
	Milutinović 2', 41'; Kaloperović 9', 19'; Mesaroš 27', 75'; Valok 61'			Stadium: Stadion JNA; Attendance: 15,000; Referee: Erlih (Ljubljana)

24 March 1957 17	Partizan	3–1	Sarajevo	Belgrade
	Zebec 52'; Milutinović 55', 81'			Stadium: Stadion JNA; Attendance: 15,000

31 March 1957 18	Budućnost	2–2	Partizan	Titograd
			Valok 31'; Kaloperović 74'	Stadium: Podgorica City Stadium; Attendance: 6,000; Referee: Kranjc (Zagreb)

7 April 1957 19	Partizan	2–0	Dinamo Zagreb	Belgrade
	Duvančić 5'; Mijatović 77'			Stadium: Stadion JNA; Attendance: 10,000; Referee: Božina (Slavonski Brod)

14 April 1957 20	Vardar	1–1	Partizan	Skopje
			Mesaroš 33'	Stadium: City Park Stadium; Attendance: 15,000; Referee: Kranjc (Zagreb)

17 April 1957 21	Partizan	0–0	Radnički Beograd	Belgrade
				Stadium: Stadion JNA; Attendance: 12,000; Referee: Mikulan (Zagreb)

29 May 1957 22	Lokomotiva	3–0	Partizan	Zagreb
				Attendance: 14,000

2 June 1957 23	Partizan	1–0	Crvena zvezda	Belgrade
	Stojanović 21' (pen.)			Stadium: Stadion JNA; Attendance: 40,000

9 June 1957 24	Spartak Subotica	3–2	Partizan	Subotica
			Zebec 33'; Duvančić 63'	Attendance: 8,000

16 June 1957 25	Partizan	2–5	Zagreb	Belgrade
	Kaloperović 23'; Zebec 84'			Stadium: Stadion JNA; Attendance: 8,000; Referee: Stanišić (Sarajevo)

23 June 1957 26	Vojvodina	5–2	Partizan	Novi Sad
			Zebec 21'; Mihajlović 23'	Attendance: 7,000

=== Yugoslav Cup ===
29 July 1956 Round of 32	Partizan	6–0	Obilić	Belgrade
	Mesaroš 18', 46', 75'; Duvančić 15', 41'; Jocić 40'			Stadium: Stadion JNA; Attendance: 3,000

28 March 1957 Round of 16	Partizan	3–1	Dinamo Zagreb	Belgrade
	Milutinović 45', 72'; Bobek 67'			Stadium: Stadion JNA; Attendance: 15,000

10 April 1957 Quarter-finals	Partizan	4–2	Crvena zvezda	Belgrade
	Valok 32'; Milutinović 70', 85'; Mesaroš 74'		Cokić 17', 61'	Stadium: Stadion JNA; Attendance: 40,000

25 April 1957 Semi-finals	Partizan	7–0	Šibenik	Belgrade
	Kaloperović 10' (pen.), 81'; Valok 37'; Marković 42'; Milutinović 68'; Bobek 75'; Živković 77' (o.g.)			Stadium: Stadion JNA; Attendance: 15,000

26 May 1957 Final	Partizan	5–3	Radnički Beograd	Belgrade
	Valok 47'; Mesaroš 59'; Kaloperović 63' (pen.); Milutinović 67'; Zebec 78'		Belin 5' (o.g.); Petaković 9'; Prljinčević 25'	Stadium: Stadion JNA; Attendance: 10,000; Referee: Borče Nedelkovski

== See also ==
- List of FK Partizan seasons
