= 1954–55 FK Partizan season =

Partizan
1954–55 season
- President: Bogdan Vujošević
- Head coach: Illés Spitz
- Yugoslav First League: 5th
- Yugoslav Cup: Winners

The 1954–55 season was the ninth season in FK Partizan's existence. This article shows player statistics and matches that the club played during the 1954–55 season.

== Friendlies ==
11 August 1954 Friendly	Partizan (Socialist Federal Republic of Yugoslavia)	3–1	(Austria) SC Wacker Viena	Belgrade

1 September 1954 Friendly	Partizan (Socialist Federal Republic of Yugoslavia)	2–1	(Socialist Federal Republic of Yugoslavia) Crvena zvezda	Belgrade
	Bobek 49'; Mihajlović 56' (pen.)		Toplak 20'	Stadium: JNA Stadium; Attendance: 30,000; Referee: Sekerezović

17 November 1954 Friendly	Partizan (Socialist Federal Republic of Yugoslavia)	3–2	(Hungary) Budapest Honvéd	Belgrade
	Valok 44', 67'; Antić 46'		Kocsis 4'; Machos 19'	Stadium: Stadion JNA; Attendance: 55,000; Referee: Marjan Matančić (Beograd)

22 December 1954 Friendly	Racing (France)	0–1	(Socialist Federal Republic of Yugoslavia) Partizan	Paris, France
			Zebec 5'

26 December 1954 Friendly	Austria Wien	3–1	(Socialist Federal Republic of Yugoslavia) Partizan	Reims, France

1 January 1955 Friendly	Partizan (Socialist Federal Republic of Yugoslavia)	3–2	(Austria) Rapid Wien	Rotterdam, Netherlands

2 January 1955 Friendly	Rot-Weiss Essen (West Germany)	0–1	(Socialist Federal Republic of Yugoslavia) Partizan	Essen, West Germany
			Čajkovski 84'

6 January 1955 Friendly	Karlsruher SC (West Germany)	4–0	(Socialist Federal Republic of Yugoslavia) Partizan	Karlsruhe, West Germany

9 January 1955 Friendly	TuS Neuendorf Koblenz (West Germany)	2–2	(Socialist Federal Republic of Yugoslavia) Partizan	Koblenz, West Germany
			Milutinović 38', ?'

12 January 1955 Friendly	Amsterdam (Netherlands)	0–2	(Socialist Federal Republic of Yugoslavia) Partizan	Amsterdam, Netherlands
			Borozan 7'; Jocić 11'	Attendance: 15,000

15 January 1955 Friendly	Partizan (Socialist Federal Republic of Yugoslavia)	4–2	(Argentina) Newell's Old Boys	Arnhem, Netherlands

16 January 1955 Friendly	Union Sportiva (Luxembourg)	0–8	(Socialist Federal Republic of Yugoslavia) Partizan	Luxembourg City, Luxembourg
			Zebec; Bobek; Jocić; Čajkovski; Mesaroš	Attendance: 8,000

9 March 1955 Friendly	Partizan (Socialist Federal Republic of Yugoslavia)	6–1	(Sweden) Norrby IF	Belgrade
	Valok 24'; Milutinović 25', 76'; Čajkovski 31', 58' (pen.) ? ?'			Stadium: Stadion JNA; Attendance: 10,000

17 April 1955 Friendly	Budapest Honvéd (Hungary)	4–2	(Socialist Federal Republic of Yugoslavia) Partizan	Budapest, Hungary
			Mihajlović 50'; Milutinović 89'	Attendance: 100,000

2 July 1955 Friendly	Spartak Moscow (Soviet Union)	2–1	(Socialist Federal Republic of Yugoslavia) Partizan	Moscow, Soviet Union
	Isayev 12', 51'		Milutinović 31'	Attendance: 60,000

6 July 1955 Friendly	Dynamo Kyiv (Soviet Union)	0–0	(Socialist Federal Republic of Yugoslavia) Partizan	Kyiv, Soviet Union

== Competitions ==
=== Yugoslav First League ===
Pos	Team	Pld	W	D	L	GF	GA	GR	Pts	Qualification or relegation
3	Dinamo Zagreb	26	14	6	6	54	49	1.102	34	
4	Red Star	26	14	5	7	57	36	1.583	33	
5	Partizan	26	12	6	8	58	36	1.611	30	Qualification for the European Cup first round
6	Vojvodina	26	10	9	7	48	36	1.333	29	
7	Sarajevo	26	11	6	9	50	36	1.389	28	

Source: rsssf.org
Rules for classification: 1st points; 2nd goal average

29 August 1954 1	Spartak Subotica	0–3	Partizan	Subotica
			Valok 7'; Jocić 10'; Bobek 14'	Attendance: 10,000; Referee: Vlajić (Beograd)

12 September 1954 2	Partizan	3–1	Željezničar	Belgrade
	Bobek 60', 78'; Borozan 87'			Stadium: JNA Stadium; Attendance: 12,000; Referee: Ivanovski

19 September 1954 3	Radnički Beograd	2–3	Partizan	Belgrade
			Mihajlović 30', 64'; Bobek ?'	Stadium: JNA Stadium; Attendance: 15,000

13 October 1954 4	Dinamo Zagreb	4–3	Partizan	Zagreb
			Jocić 11'; Pajević 49'; Bobek 55'	Attendance: 15,000

24 October 1954 5	Hajduk Split	2–1	Partizan	Split
			Herceg 36'	Stadium: Stadion Stari plac Attendance: 16,000

28 October 1954 6	Partizan	2–2	Proleter Osijek	Belgrade
	Jocić 20'; Valok 22'			Stadium: JNA Stadium; Attendance: 5,000; Referee: Voja Jovanović (Sarajevo)

31 October 1954 7	Partizan	2–3	Lokomotiva Zagreb	Belgrade
	Jocić 24'; Bobek 87'			Stadium: JNA Stadium; Attendance: 20,000

10 November 1954 8	Zagreb	1–1	Partizan	Zagreb
			Bobek 64'	Attendance: 6,000; Referee: Makijedo

14 November 1954 9	Partizan	3–0	Sarajevo	Belgrade
	Bobek 31', 36', 65'			Stadium: JNA Stadium; Attendance: 10,000

21 November 1954 10	Crvena zvezda	2–1	Partizan	Belgrade
	Toplak 44' (pen.); Živanović 56'		Valok 49'	Stadium: JNA Stadium; Attendance: 20,000; Referee: Lemešić

2 December 1954 11	Partizan	3–0	Vardar	Belgrade
	Valok 39', 53'; Jocić 85'			Stadium: JNA Stadium; Attendance: 3,000; Referee: Erlih (Ljubljana)

5 December 1954 12	Vojvodina	1–1	Partizan	Novi Sad
			Zebec 4'	Stadium: Karađorđe Stadium; Attendance: 10,000

12 December 1954 13	Partizan	0–3	BSK	Belgrade
				Stadium: JNA Stadium; Attendance: 20,000

13 March 1955 14	Partizan	5–0	Spartak Subotica	Belgrade
	Valok 25'; Čajkovski 51' (pen.); Branisavljević 64' (o.g.); Hmeljina 69'; Milutinović 77'			Stadium: JNA Stadium; Attendance: 20,000; Referee: Stanišić (Sarajevo)

20 March 1955 15	Željezničar	1–3	Partizan	Sarajevo
			Bobek 17'; Milutinović 22'; Valok 46'	Attendance: 18,000

26 March 1955 16	Partizan	7–0	Radnički Beograd	Belgrade
	Milutinović 3', 44', 77'; Bobek 22'; Čajkovski 41', 58' (pen.); Valok 47'			Stadium: JNA Stadium; Attendance: 14,000

3 April 1955 17	Proleter Osijek	2–5	Partizan	Osijek
			Valok 17'; Čajkovski 21' (pen.); Mihajlović 39'; Milutinović 73'; Bobek 78'	Attendance: 11,000

21 April 1955 18	Partizan	3–2	Dinamo Zagreb	Belgrade
	Čajkovski 13'; Milutinović 74', 83'			Stadium: JNA Stadium; Attendance: 30,000; Referee: Ivanovski (Skopje)

28 April 1955 19	Partizan	0–1	Hajduk Split	Belgrade
				Stadium: JNA Stadium; Attendance: 40,000

8 May 1955 20	Lokomotiva Zagreb	0–3	Partizan	Zagreb
			Bobek 42', 58'; Mihajlović 52'	Attendance: 7,000; Referee: Erlih (Ljubljana)

18 May 1955 21	Partizan	1–3	Zagreb	Belgrade
	Herceg 20'			Stadium: JNA Stadium; Attendance: 7,000

28 May 1955 22	Sarajevo	1–3	Partizan	Sarajevo
			Hmeljina 39', 57'; Čajkovski 61'	Attendance: 10,000

5 June 1955 23	Vardar	0–0	Partizan	Skopje
				Attendance: 18,000

8 June 1955 24	Partizan	1–4	Crvena zvezda	Belgrade
	Mihajlović 13'		Cokić 27', 32'; Toplak 78'; Mitić 88'	Stadium: JNA Stadium; Attendance: 50,000; Referee: Marković

12 June 1955 25	Partizan	0–0	Vojvodina	Belgrade
				Stadium: JNA Stadium; Attendance: 9,000

19 June 1955 26	BSK	1–1	Partizan	Belgrade
			Valok 80'	Attendance: 12,000

=== Yugoslav Cup ===
8 August 1954 Qualifying round	Dinamo Pančevo	2–7	Partizan	Pančevo
			Mihajlović; Milutinović; Hmeljina; Čajkovski

18 August 1954 Qualifying round	Partizan	17–0	Hajduk Beograd	Belgrade
	Valok; Čajkovski; Jocić; Bobek; Hmeljina ? o.g.'			Attendance: 1,500

22 August 1954 Round of 16	Vojvodina	2–4	Partizan	Novi Sad
			Valok 11'; Jocić 13'; Bobek 55'; Hmeljina 78'	Attendance: 7,000

10 October 1954 Quarter-finals	Partizan	7–2	Split	Belgrade
	Jocić 3'; Bobek 17', 41', 70', 79', 90'; Valok 59'			Stadium: Stadion JNA; Attendance: 3,000; Referee: Botić (Valjevo)

7 November 1954 Semi-finals	Hajduk Split	0–4	Partizan	Split
			Jocić 19', 34'; Valok 22', 49'	Stadium: Stadion Stari plac Attendance: 11,201; Referee: Damjani

29 November 1954 Final	Partizan	4–1	Crvena zvezda	Belgrade
	Valok 4', 50'; Bobek 20'; Mihajlović 29'		Živanović 65'	Stadium: Stadion JNA; Attendance: 50,000; Referee: Vlajić

== Statistics ==
=== Goalscorers ===
This includes all competitive matches.

Rank	Pos	Nat	Name	Yugoslav First League	Yugoslav Cup	Total
1	FW	(Socialist Federal Republic of Yugoslavia)	Stjepan Bobek	15	9	24
2	FW	(Socialist Federal Republic of Yugoslavia)	Marko Valok	10	11	21
3	FW	(Socialist Federal Republic of Yugoslavia)	Stanoje Jocić	5	8	13
4	MF	(Socialist Federal Republic of Yugoslavia)	Zlatko Čajkovski	6	5	11
5	FW	(Socialist Federal Republic of Yugoslavia)	Miloš Milutinović	8	2	10
6	MF	(Socialist Federal Republic of Yugoslavia)	Prvoslav Mihajlović	5	4	9
7	FW	(Socialist Federal Republic of Yugoslavia)	Drago Hmeljina	3	3	6
8	MF	(Socialist Federal Republic of Yugoslavia)	Antun Herceg	2	0	2
8	own goals			1	1	2
10	MF	(Socialist Federal Republic of Yugoslavia)	Branko Zebec	1	0	1
10	MF	(Socialist Federal Republic of Yugoslavia)	Ranko Borozan	1	0	1
10	MF	(Socialist Federal Republic of Yugoslavia)	Božidar Pajević	1	0	1
TOTALS				58	43	101

=== Score overview ===
Win Draw Loss

Opposition	Home score	Away score	Aggregate
Hajduk Split	0–1	1–2	1–3
BSK	0–3	1–1	1–4
Dinamo Zagreb	3–2	3–4	6–6
Crvena zvezda	1–4	1–2	2–6
Vojvodina	0–0	1–1	1–1
Sarajevo	3–0	3–1	6–1
Spartak Subotica	5–0	3–0	8–0
Zagreb	1–3	1–1	2–4
Radnički Beograd	7–0	3–2	10–2
Željezničar	3–1	3–1	6–2
Proleter Osijek	2–2	5–2	7–4
Vardar	3–0	0–0	3–0
Lokomotiva Zagreb	2–3	3–0	5–3

== See also ==
- List of FK Partizan seasons
