= 1954 Yugoslav Cup =

1954 Yugoslav Football Cup
8th Marshal Tito Cup

Tournament details
- Country: Yugoslavia
- Dates: 22 August – 29 November
- Teams: 16

Final positions
- Champions: Partizan (3rd title)
- Runners-up: Red Star

Tournament statistics
- Matches played: 15
- Goals scored: 72 (4.8 per match)
- Goals scored in penalty shoot-outs not included.

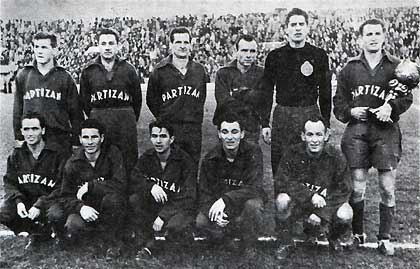
The Partizan team that won the 1954 Yugoslav Cup. Standing from left to right: Ranko Borozan, Miodrag Jovanović, Čedomir Lazarević, Bruno Belin, Slavko Stojanović, and Stjepan Bobek (captain). Crouching from left to right: Prvoslav Mihajlović, Marko Valok, Stanoje Jocić, Branko Zebec and Zlatko Čajkovski.

The 1954 Yugoslav Cup was the 8th season of the top football knockout competition in SFR Yugoslavia, the Yugoslav Cup (Serbo-Croatian: Kup Jugoslavije), also known as the "Marshal Tito Cup" (Kup Maršala Tita), since its establishment in 1946.

== First round proper ==
In the following tables winning teams are marked in bold; teams from outside top level are marked in italic script.

Tie no	Home team	Score	Away team
1	Dinamo Zagreb	2–3	**Red Star**
2	Lovćen Cetinje	0–4	**Spartak Subotica**
3	**Mačva Šabac**	4–0	Rijeka
4	Rabotnički	0–7	**Hajduk Split**
5	Radnički Niš	1–1 (4–5 p)	**Odred Ljubljana**
6	**RNK Split**	0–0 (4–2 p)	Radnički Belgrade
7	**Velež**	3–2	BSK Belgrade
8	Vojvodina	2–4	**Partizan**

== Quarter-finals ==
Tie no	Home team	Score	Away team
1	Odred Ljubljana	1–5	**Hajduk Split**
2	**Partizan**	7–2	RNK Split
3	**Red Star**	9–0	Velež
4	**Spartak Subotica**	5–0	Mačva Šabac

== Semi-finals ==
Tie no	Home team	Score	Away team
1	Hajduk Split	0–4	**Partizan**
2	Spartak Subotica	0–1	**Red Star**

== Final ==
29 November 1954

Partizan	4–1	Red Star
Valok 4', 49'; Mihajlović 7'; Bobek 20'		Živanović 65'

Stadion JNA, Belgrade
Attendance: 40,000
Referee: Vlajić (Belgrade)

PARTIZAN:
GK	1	(Socialist Federal Republic of Yugoslavia) Slavko Stojanović
	2	(Socialist Federal Republic of Yugoslavia) Bruno Belin
	3	(Socialist Federal Republic of Yugoslavia) Čedomir Lazarević
	4	(Socialist Federal Republic of Yugoslavia) Zlatko Čajkovski
	5	(Socialist Federal Republic of Yugoslavia) Miodrag Jovanović
	6	(Socialist Federal Republic of Yugoslavia) Ranko Borozan
	7	(Socialist Federal Republic of Yugoslavia) Prvoslav Mihajlović
	8	(Socialist Federal Republic of Yugoslavia) Stanoje Jocić
	9	(Socialist Federal Republic of Yugoslavia) Marko Valok
	10	(Socialist Federal Republic of Yugoslavia) Stjepan Bobek
	11	(Socialist Federal Republic of Yugoslavia) Branko Zebec
Manager:
(Hungary) Illés Spitz

RED STAR:
GK	1	(Socialist Federal Republic of Yugoslavia) Nikola Prvulović
	2	(Socialist Federal Republic of Yugoslavia) Branko Stanković
	3	(Socialist Federal Republic of Yugoslavia) Miljan Zeković
	4	(Socialist Federal Republic of Yugoslavia) Vladica Popović
	5	(Socialist Federal Republic of Yugoslavia) Ljuba Spajić
	6	(Socialist Federal Republic of Yugoslavia) Jovan Cokić
	7	(Socialist Federal Republic of Yugoslavia) Antun Rudinski
	8	(Socialist Federal Republic of Yugoslavia) Ivan Toplak
	9	(Socialist Federal Republic of Yugoslavia) Todor Živanović
	10	(Socialist Federal Republic of Yugoslavia) Predrag Đajić
	11	(Socialist Federal Republic of Yugoslavia) Bora Kostić
Manager:
(Socialist Federal Republic of Yugoslavia) Milovan Ćirić

== See also ==
- 1954–55 Yugoslav First League
- 1954–55 Yugoslav Second League
