= 1953–54 FK Partizan season =

Partizan
1953–54 season
- President: Bogdan Vujošević
- Head coach: Milovan Ćirić
- Yugoslav First League: Runners-up
- Yugoslav Cup: Quarter-finals

The 1953–54 season was the eighth season in FK Partizan's existence. This article shows player statistics and matches that the club played during the 1953–54 season.

== Friendlies ==
9 August 1953 Friendly	Partizan (Socialist Federal Republic of Yugoslavia)	2–1	(Socialist Federal Republic of Yugoslavia) Crvena zvezda	Belgrade
	Milutinović			Stadium: JNA Stadium

27 December 1953 Friendly	Colo-Colo (Chile)	1–0	(Socialist Federal Republic of Yugoslavia) Partizan	Santiago, Chile

3 January 1954 Friendly	Colo-Colo (Chile)	4–8	(Socialist Federal Republic of Yugoslavia) Partizan	Santiago, Chile
			Jocić; Zebec,, Milutinović, Herceg,	Attendance: 50,000

7 January 1954 Friendly	Peñarol (Uruguay)	1–1	(Socialist Federal Republic of Yugoslavia) Partizan	Montevideo, Uruguay
			Milutinović 23'	Attendance: 40,000

9 January 1954 Friendly	Racing (Argentina)	2–1	(Socialist Federal Republic of Yugoslavia) Partizan	Buenos Aires, Argentina
			Milutinović 29'	Attendance: 90,000

16 January 1954 Friendly	Club Libertad (Paraguay)	4–3	(Socialist Federal Republic of Yugoslavia) Partizan	Asunción, Paraguay

17 January 1954 Friendly	Sportivo Luqueño (Paraguay)	4–1	(Socialist Federal Republic of Yugoslavia) Partizan	Asunción, Paraguay

26 January 1954 Friendly	Newell's Old Boys (Argentina)	4–0	(Socialist Federal Republic of Yugoslavia) Partizan	Rosario, Argentina

30 January 1954 Friendly	River Plate (Argentina)	1–1	(Socialist Federal Republic of Yugoslavia) Partizan	Buenos Aires, Argentina
	Gómez 39'		Mihajlović 18'

9 June 1954 Friendly	Racing Besançon (France)	1–3	(Socialist Federal Republic of Yugoslavia) Partizan	Besançon, France

10 June 1954 Friendly	Partizan (Socialist Federal Republic of Yugoslavia)	1–0	(Socialist Federal Republic of Yugoslavia) Vojvodina	Reims, France

15 June 1954 Friendly	Marseille (France)	0–3	(Socialist Federal Republic of Yugoslavia) Partizan	Lyon, France

17 June 1954 Friendly	Angers (France)	4–1	(Socialist Federal Republic of Yugoslavia) Partizan	Angers, France

23 June 1954 Friendly	Rouen (France)	1–3	(Socialist Federal Republic of Yugoslavia) Partizan	Rouen, France

== Competitions ==
=== Yugoslav First League ===
Pos	Team	Pld	W	D	L	GF	GA	GR	Pts
1	Dinamo Zagreb (C)	26	19	4	3	72	22	3.273	42
2	Partizan	26	18	5	3	77	30	2.567	41
3	Red Star Belgrade	26	17	4	5	51	22	2.318	38
4	Hajduk Split	26	16	3	7	55	34	1.618	35
5	Vojvodina	26	14	5	7	60	37	1.622	33

Source: rsssf.org
Rules for classification: 1st points; 2nd goal average
(C) Champions

30 August 1953 1	Lokomotiva Zagreb	0–1	Partizan	Zagreb
			Herceg 49'	Attendance: 12,000; Referee: Barjaktarević (Beograd)

6 September 1953 2	Partizan	4–1	Sarajevo	Belgrade
	Bobek 27', 71', 76'; Valok 84'			Stadium: JNA Stadium; Attendance: 25,000; Referee: Vasa Stefanović

9 September 1953 3	Dinamo Zagreb	2–0	Partizan	Zagreb
				Attendance: 18,000

13 September 1953 4	BSK	2–1	Partizan	Belgrade
			Bobek 63'	Stadium: JNA Stadium; Attendance: 20,000

20 September 1953 5	Partizan	1–1	Radnički Beograd	Belgrade
	Milutinović 5'			Stadium: JNA Stadium; Attendance: 8,000

27 September 1953 6	Proleter Osijek	2–3	Partizan	Osijek
			Bobek 19', 83'; Jelisavčić 84'	Attendance: 7,000

7 October 1953 7	Spartak Subotica	2–6	Partizan	Subotica
			Milutinović 18'; Herceg 48'; Bobek 49', 63'; Mihajlović 50', 57'	Attendance: 10,000

10 October 1953 8	Partizan	4–2	Vojvodina	Belgrade
	Zebec 7', 64'; Milutinović 73'; Bobek 85'			Stadium: JNA Stadium; Attendance: 10,000

25 October 1953 9	Partizan	4–2	Hajduk Split	Belgrade
	Bobek 10', 66'; Zebec 71'; Mihajlović 79'			Stadium: JNA Stadium; Attendance: 30,000; Referee: Vasa Stefanović

1 November 1953 10	Rabotnički	0–8	Partizan	Skopje
			Milutinović 3', 17'; Pajević 20'; Bobek 38'; Zebec 41', 60', 75', 77'	Stadium: Gradski stadion u Skoplju; Attendance: 10,000; Referee: Mića Perović

15 November 1953 11	Vardar	1–2	Partizan	Skopje
			Mihajlović 59'; Milutinović 60'	Attendance: 10,000

29 November 1953 12	Odred	2–6	Partizan	Ljubljana
			Mihajlović 35'; Milutinović 37', 51'; Čajkovski 39', 40'; Bobek 49'	Attendance: 5,000

6 December 1953 13	Partizan	7–1	Crvena zvezda	Belgrade
	Bobek 4'; Zebec 40', 65'; Mihajlović 45', 50'; Herceg 46', 66'		Tomašević 12'	Stadium: JNA Stadium; Attendance: 55,000; Referee: Vasa Stefanović

13 December 1953 14	Partizan	2–0	Lokomotiva Zagreb	Belgrade
	Zebec 10' (pen.), 80'			Stadium: JNA Stadium; Attendance: 12,000; Referee: Makijedo (Split)

20 December 1953 15	Sarajevo	2–1	Partizan	Sarajevo
			Zebec 19'	Attendance: 15,000

14 February 1954 16	Partizan	1–0	Dinamo Zagreb	Belgrade
	Bobek 10'			Stadium: JNA Stadium; Attendance: 20,000

28 February 1954 17	Radnički Beograd	2–4	Partizan	Belgrade
	Petaković 53', 72'		Milutinović 34', 59'; Jovanović 79'; Zebec 89'	Attendance: 20,000; Referee: Milan Nikolić

4 March 1954 18	Partizan	1–1	BSK	Belgrade
	Mihajlović 60' (pen.)			Stadium: JNA Stadium; Attendance: 25,000

7 March 1954 19	Partizan	3–3	Proleter Osijek	Belgrade
	Mihajlović 7' (pen.), 54' (pen.); Bobek 33'			Stadium: JNA Stadium; Attendance: 10,000

4 April 1954 20	Vojvodina	1–1	Partizan	Novi Sad
			Milutinović 23'	Stadium: Stadion Karađorđe; Attendance: 20,000; Referee: Nikolić

7 April 1954 21	Hajduk Split	2–2	Partizan	Split
			Zebec 55', 84'	Stadium: Stadion Stari plac Attendance: 12,000; Referee: Damjani

11 April 1954 22	Partizan	8–0	Rabotnički	Belgrade
	Bobek 14', 17', 48', 81'; Herceg 39', 61', 87'; Milutinović 85'			Stadium: JNA Stadium; Attendance: 30,000; Referee: Gvardijančić

14 April 1954 23	Partizan	2–1	Spartak Subotica	Belgrade
	Bobek 22'; Milutinović 39'			Stadium: JNA Stadium; Attendance: 8,000

18 April 1954 24	Partizan	1–0	Vardar	Belgrade
	Pajević 21'			Stadium: JNA Stadium; Attendance: 18,000

25 April 1954 25	Partizan	2–0	Odred	Belgrade
	Mihajlović 30' (pen.); Milutinović 82'			Stadium: JNA Stadium; Attendance: 10,000

2 May 1954 26	Crvena zvezda	0–2	Partizan	Belgrade
			Valok 7', 50'	Stadium: JNA Stadium; Attendance: 50,000

=== Yugoslav Cup ===
12 August 1953 Qualifying round	Mladost Svetozarevo	0–11	Partizan	Svetozarevo
			Bobek; Belin; Milutinović; Zebec; Mihajlović	Attendance: 4,000

16 August 1953 Qualifying round	Borac Čačak	3–4	Partizan	Čačak
			Bobek; Belin; Mihajlović	Attendance: 4,000

23 August 1953 Round of 16	Partizan	2–0	Sarajevo	Belgrade
	Čajkovski; Zebec			Stadium: JNA Stadium; Attendance: 4,000

4 October 1953 Quarter-finals	Partizan	5–5 (2–3 p)	Dinamo Zagreb	Belgrade
	Milutinović 1', 24', 72'; Zebec 70'; Belin 81'			Stadium: JNA Stadium; Attendance: 40,000

== Statistics ==
=== Goalscorers ===
This includes all competitive matches.

Rank	Pos	Nat	Name	Yugoslav First League	Yugoslav Cup	Total
1	FW	(Socialist Federal Republic of Yugoslavia)	Stjepan Bobek	21	5	26
2	MF	(Socialist Federal Republic of Yugoslavia)	Branko Zebec	15	4	19
2	FW	(Socialist Federal Republic of Yugoslavia)	Miloš Milutinović	14	5	19
4	MF	(Socialist Federal Republic of Yugoslavia)	Prvoslav Mihajlović	11	2	13
5	MF	(Socialist Federal Republic of Yugoslavia)	Antun Herceg	7	0	7
6	DF	(Socialist Federal Republic of Yugoslavia)	Bruno Belin	0	5	5
7	FW	(Socialist Federal Republic of Yugoslavia)	Marko Valok	3	0	3
7	MF	(Socialist Federal Republic of Yugoslavia)	Zlatko Čajkovski	2	1	3
9	MF	(Socialist Federal Republic of Yugoslavia)	Božidar Pajević	2	0	2
10	FW	(Socialist Federal Republic of Yugoslavia)	Tiko Jelisavčić	1	0	1
10	DF	(Socialist Federal Republic of Yugoslavia)	Miodrag Jovanović	1	0	1
TOTALS				77	22	99

=== Score overview ===
Win Draw Loss

Opposition	Home score	Away score	Aggregate
Dinamo Zagreb	1–0	0–2	1–2
Crvena zvezda	7–1	2–0	9–1
Hajduk Split	4–2	2–2	6–4
Vojvodina	4–2	1–1	5–3
Spartak Subotica	2–1	6–2	8–3
Sarajevo	4–1	1–2	5–3
BSK	1–1	1–2	2–3
Vardar	1–0	2–1	3–1
Proleter Osijek	3–3	3–2	6–5
Lokomotiva Zagreb	2–0	1–0	3–0
Radnički Beograd	1–1	4–2	5–3
Odred	2–0	6–2	8–2
Rabotnički	8–0	8–0	16–0

== See also ==
- List of FK Partizan seasons
