= 1949–50 FK Partizan season =

Partizan
1949–50 season
- Head coach: Illés Spitz
- Yugoslav First League: 3rd
- Yugoslav Cup: Semi-finals

The 1949–50 season was the fourth season in FK Partizan's existence. This article shows player statistics and matches that the club played during the 1949–50 season.

== Players ==
First 11

Šoštarić, Kolaković, Čolić, Čajkovski, Jovanović, Jakovetić, Mihajlović, Pajević, Valok, Bobek, Atanacković

Other players

Grčević, Petrović, Drenovac, Lazarević, Senčar, Simonovski, Požega, Marjanović, Radunović, Racić, Vorgić, Hočevar, Bogojevac, Krajišnik, Šijaković, Stipić, Stanković, Popović i Kantardžić.

== Competitions ==
=== Yugoslav First League ===
Pos	Team	Pld	W	D	L	GF	GA	GR	Pts
1	Hajduk Split (C)	18	10	8	0	28	13	2.154	28
2	Red Star Belgrade	18	12	2	4	44	18	2.444	26
3	Partizan	18	12	2	4	46	19	2.421	26
4	Dinamo Zagreb	18	9	4	5	23	17	1.353	22
5	Sarajevo	18	7	3	8	30	27	1.111	17

Source: rsssf.org
Rules for classification: 1st points; 2nd goal average.
(C) Champions

5 March 1950 1	Dinamo Zagreb	2–1	Partizan	Zagreb
	Wölfl 48', 55'		Valok 11'	Stadium: Stadion Maksimir; Attendance: 30,000; Referee: Leo Lemešić

12 March 1950 2	Partizan	2–1	Naša Krila	Belgrade
	Senčar 2'; Mihajlović 35' (pen.)		Pečenčić 28'	Attendance: 25,000

19 March 1950 3	Crvena zvezda	3–1	Partizan	Belgrade
	Tomašević 35'; Antić 46'; Vukosavljević 75'		Pajević 24'	Attendance: 35,000; Referee: Miljenko Podupski

29 March 1950 4	Partizan	0–0	Hajduk Split	Belgrade
				Attendance: 30,000

10 April 1950 5	Partizan	4–1	Lokomotiva Zagreb	Belgrade
	Bobek; Mihajlović; Atanacković		Kapetanović	Attendance: 20,000

16 April 1950 6	Sarajevo	2–5	Partizan	Sarajevo
	Glavočević 5', 17'		Mihajlović 25'; Atanacković 52'; Bobek 55'; Valok 70', 75'	Attendance: 20,000; Referee: Leo Lemešić

20 April 1950 7	Spartak Subotica	0–1	Partizan	Subotica
			Pajević 30'	Stadium: Subotica City Stadium; Attendance: 10,000; Referee: Viktor Šter

23 April 1950 8	Budućnost	2–4	Partizan	Titograd
	Savović 11'; Čelebić 88'		Valok 1', 20', 54'; Čajkovski 57'	Stadium: Stadion pod Goricom; Attendance: 8,000; Referee: Živko Vlajić

7 May 1950 9	Partizan	0–1	Metalac Belgrade	Belgrade
			Begovac 38'	Attendance: 20,000

20 August 1950 10	Partizan	2–0	Dinamo Zagreb	Belgrade
	Valok 64', 89'			Attendance: 25,000

27 August 1950 11	Naša Krila	1–3	Partizan	Belgrade
			Mihajlović; Pajević ? o.g.'	Attendance: 20,000

17 September 1950 12	Partizan	2–1	Crvena zvezda	Belgrade
	Valok 33'; Mihajlović 53'			Attendance: 45,000

24 September 1950 13	Hajduk Split	0–0	Partizan	Split
				Attendance: 18,000

1 October 1950 14	Partizan	3–0	Spartak Subotica	Belgrade
	Mihajlović 33' (pen.); Valok 46'; Hočevar 70'			Attendance: 8,000

18 October 1950 15	Lokomotiva Zagreb	3–1	Partizan	Zagreb
			Hočevar 21'	Attendance: 12,000

22 October 1950 16	Partizan	3–1	Sarajevo	Belgrade
	Čajkovski; Bobek; Atanacković			Attendance: 20,000

26 October 1950 17	Metalac Belgrade	1–4	Partizan	Belgrade
			Bobek; Valok; Mihajlović	Attendance: 15,000

29 October 1950 18	Partizan	10–0	Budućnost	Belgrade
	Valok 4', 24', 70', 84'; Atanacković 34'; Bobek 52'; Čajkovski 53'; Mihajlović 60'; Pajević 79'			Attendance: 6,000

=== Yugoslav Cup ===
16 October 1949 Qualifying round	Partizan	8–0	Zagreb	Belgrade
	Valok; Atanacković; Bobek; Simonovski			Attendance: 16,000

6 November 1949 Round of 32	Partizan	3–2	Napredak Kruševac	Belgrade
	Valok; Bobek; Simonovski			Attendance: 6,000

17 November 1949 Round of 16	Lokomotiva Zagreb	3–4	Partizan	Zagreb
			Valok; Atanacković; Strnad ? o.g.'	Attendance: 12,000

20 November 1949 Quarter-finals	Partizan	1–3	Naša Krila	Belgrade
	Atanacković			Attendance: 18,000

== See also ==
- List of FK Partizan seasons
