= Nadoveza =

Nadoveza (Serbian Cyrillic: Надовеза) is a Croatian and Serbian surname.

Notable people with the surname include:

- Petar Nadoveza (1942–2023), Croatian footballer
- Branko Nadoveza (1950–1970), Serbian footballer
