= FK Partizan Academy =

- Full name: Belin–Lazarević–Nadoveza youth school
- Nicknames: Crno-beli (The Black and Whites); Parni valjak (The Steamroller)
- Director: Vanja Radinović
- Website: partizan.rs/omladinska-skola-fudbala
Home colours	Away colours

The FK Partizan Youth School (Serbian: Omladinska škola Fudbalskog kluba Partizan/Омладинска школа фудбалског клуба Партизан), also known as Belin–Lazarević–Nadoveza youth school, is the youth school for Serbian football club Partizan Belgrade.

It was founded in the 1950s and named after former Partizan players Bruno Belin, Čedomir Lazarević and Branko Nadoveza. The school is well known for its dedicated work with youngsters. Its training philosophy is not only the development of football players, but also to care of their growth and personality forming, while also teaching the sporting spirit and the loyalty to the club. There are around 400 youngsters classified by age categories. There are six age groups, four compete at the level of the Football Association of Serbia, the U17, U16, U15 and U14, while the U13 and U12 compete at the level of the Football Association of Belgrade. Below U12 level there are no official competitions, but players do play in tournaments and friendly matches.

Partizan is the club with most league titles and cup wins in youth competition in Serbia. The youth teams also participate in numerous tournaments around Europe and also organize an U17 international tournament with participation of some of the top European clubs. Partizan also organizes football camps for children in Serbia, Montenegro, Bosnia and Herzegovina, Slovenia, Australia and United States. Many of the best youth academy players move directly to the Partizan senior side, or to the affiliate club Teleoptik Zemun.

All of Partizan's youth categories train at the Partizan sport complex named SC Partizan-Teleoptik along with Partizan's seniors and the players of Teleoptik. Partizan has won several awards for its youth work, including "Best European Youth Work" in 2006, and the club's youth school has been declared the second-best in Europe after that of Ajax Amsterdam. Partizan's academy has produced numerous professional football players or Yugoslav and Serbian internationals.

The Partizan Academy is one of the most renowned and export-oriented in Europe. CIES (University of Neuchâtel International Centre for Sports Studies) Football Observatory report of November 2015 ranks Partizan Belgrade at the top place of training clubs out of the 31 European leagues surveyed

== Academy officials ==
Current staff
- Director: (Serbia) Miralem Sulejmani
- Assistant director: (Serbia) Nenad Marinković
- Scouting director: (Serbia) Nedeljko Kostić
- Scout: (Serbia) Dušan Trbojević
- School Secretary: (Serbia) Dragan Šušnjar
- U19 Coach: (North Macedonia) Nikica Klinčarski
- U17 Coach: (Serbia) Ilija Zavišić
- U16 Coach: (Serbia) Vanja Radinović
- U15 Coach: (Serbia) Darko Tešović
- U14 Coach: (Serbia) Dragan Kecman
- U13 Coach: (Serbia) Milan Ristić
- U12 Coach: (Serbia) Slađan Šćepović
- U11 Coach: (Serbia) Zoran Mamić
- U10 Coach: (Serbia) Zoran Kraljević
- U9 Coach: (Serbia) Zvonko Popović
- Goalkeeping coach: (Serbia) Predrag Jušić
- Fitness coach: (Serbia) Aleksandar Tomić
- Equipment manager: (Serbia) Miodrag Stojanović
- Equipment manager: (Serbia) Slobodan Todorović

== Notable youth graduates ==
- (Serbia) Milan Aleksić
- (Serbia) Stefan Babović
- (Serbia) Veljko Birmančević
- (Serbia) Miroslav Bogosavac
- (Serbia) Darko Brašanac
- (Serbia) Dragan Ćirić
- (Serbia) Igor Duljaj
- (Serbia) Vanja Dragojević
- (Serbia) Ivan Golac
- (Serbia) Nikola Gulan
- (Serbia) Andrej Ilić
- (Serbia) Mihajlo Ilić
- (Serbia) Saša Ilić
- (Serbia) Ivica Iliev
- (Serbia) Miloš Jojić
- (Serbia) Đorđe Jovanović
- (Serbia) Nemanja Jović
- (Serbia) Fahrudin Jusufi
- (Serbia) Bogdan Kostić
- (Serbia) Vladica Kovačević
- (Serbia) Danko Lazović
- (Serbia) Saša Lukić
- (Serbia) Adem Ljajić
- (Serbia) Lazar Marković
- (Serbia) Svetozar Marković
- (Serbia) Nikola Milenković
- (Serbia) Savo Milošević
- (Serbia) Aleksandar Mitrović
- (Serbia) Marko Milovanović
- (Serbia) Bogdan Mirčetić
- (Serbia) Albert Nađ
- (Serbia) Matija Nastasić
- (Serbia) Nikola Ninković
- (Serbia) Ivan Obradović
- (Serbia) Veljko Paunović
- (Serbia) Danilo Pantić
- (Serbia) Strahinja Pavlović
- (Serbia) Matija Popović
- (Serbia) Ivan Radovanović
- (Serbia) Nemanja Rnić
- (Serbia) Nikola Simić
- (Serbia) Milan Smiljanić
- (Serbia) Filip Stevanović
- (Serbia) Miralem Sulejmani
- (Serbia) Milutin Šoškić
- (Serbia) Nikola Štulić
- (Serbia) Nemanja Trifunović
- (Serbia) Ognjen Ugrešić
- (Serbia) Velibor Vasović
- (Serbia) Vladimir Vermezović
- (Serbia) Dušan Vlahović
- (Serbia) Momčilo Vukotić
- (Serbia) Andrija Živković
- (Bosnia and Herzegovina) Samed Baždar
- (North Macedonia) Nikica Klinčarski
- (Montenegro) Stevan Jovetić
- (Montenegro) Ivica Kralj
- (Montenegro) Simon Vukčević
- (Montenegro) Marko Janković

== UEFA Youth League record ==
Season	Stage	Round	Opponent	Home	Away	Agg.
2023–24	Domestic Champions Path	1R	(Romania) Universitatea Craiova	4–0	1–0	5–0
2023–24	Domestic Champions Path	2R	(Moldova) Sheriff Tiraspol	5–2	0–2	5–4
2023–24	Domestic Champions Path	PO	(Portugal) Braga	0–2		
