= Zvonko Popović =

Serbian footballer

Personal information
- Full name: Zvonko Popović
- Date of birth: 24 December 1961 (age 64)
- Place of birth: Krupanj, FPR Yugoslavia
- Height: 5 ft 9 in (1.75 m)
- Position: Defender

Youth career
- 1977–1980: Rađevac

Senior career*
Years	Team	Apps	(Gls)
1980–1985	Partizan	52	(1)
1981	→ Panserraikos (loan)	4	(0)
1985–1986	Budućnost Titograd	16	(4)
1986–1987	Vojvodina	27	(3)
1987–1989	Angers	53	(2)
1989–1990	Perpignan		

Managerial career
- 1998–2000: Teleoptik (youth)
- 2000–2011: Partizan (youth)
- * Club domestic league appearances and goals

Zvonko Popović (Serbian Cyrillic: Звонко Поповић; born 24 December 1961) is a Serbian football coach and former player.

Since 2000, he has been one of the FK Partizan Academy coaches.

== Honours ==
Partizan

- Yugoslav First League: 1982–83
