= Boris Škanata =

Yugoslav swimmer

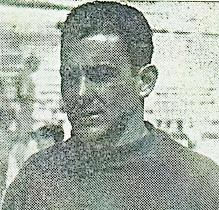

Personal information
- Born: 18 May 1927 Tivat, Kingdom of Serbs, Croats and Slovenes (present-day Montenegro)
- Died: 20 October 1962 (aged 35) Belgrade, FPR Yugoslavia
Medal record
Men's swimming
Representing Yugoslavia
European Championships
Bronze medal – third place	1950 Vienna	100 m backstroke

Boris Škanata (18 May 1927 – 20 October 1962) was a Yugoslav swimmer who won a bronze medal in the 100 m backstroke at the 1950 European Aquatics Championships. He finished seventh in the same event at the 1952 Summer Olympics.

== Death ==
Škanata died in a car crash on 20 October 1962 at the 25th kilometre of the Belgrade–Zagreb highway. Also killed with him were FK Partizan footballers Čedomir Lazarević and Bruno Belin and Radnički footballer Vladimir Josipović.

== Personal life ==
He had a son named Aleksandar (born 1951).
