= Čedomir Lazarević =

Serbian footballer

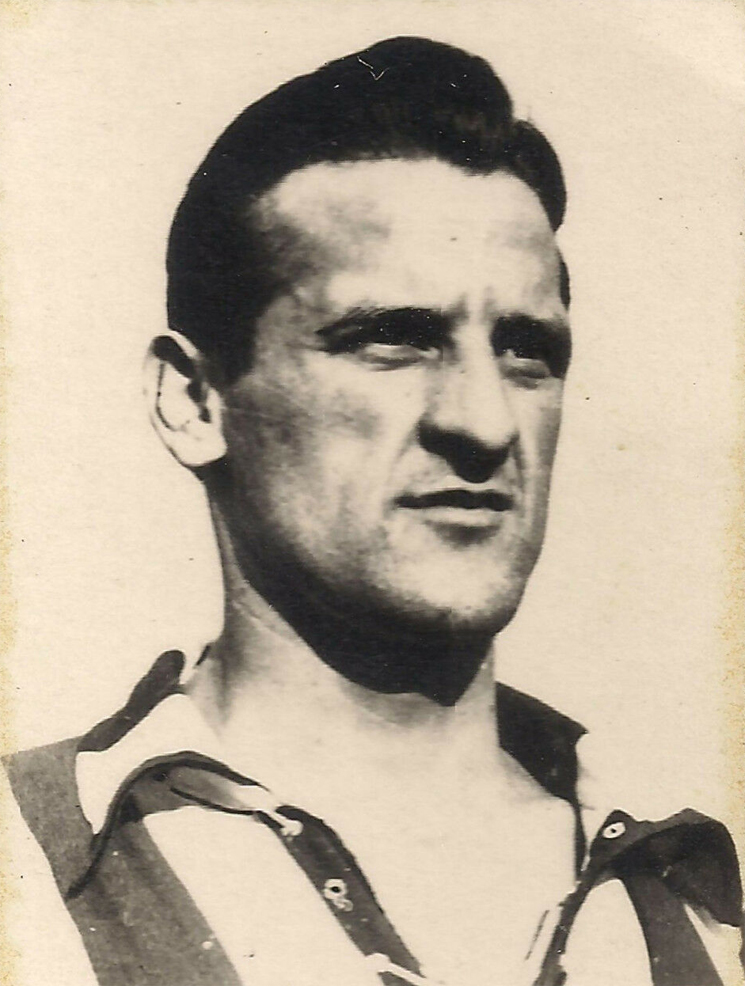

Personal information
- Date of birth: 5 October 1926
- Place of birth: Belgrade, Kingdom of SCS
- Date of death: 20 October 1962 (aged 36)
- Place of death: Belgrade, FPR Yugoslavia
- Position: Defender

Youth career
- Partizan

Senior career*
Years	Team	Apps	(Gls)
1948–1958	Partizan	118	(4)

Managerial career
- 1961–1962: Partizan (youth)
- * Club domestic league appearances and goals

Čedomir Lazarević (Serbian Cyrillic: Чедомир Лазаревић; 5 October 1926 – 20 October 1962) was a Serbian footballer who played for FK Partizan.

== Death ==
He died in a car crash on 20 October 1962 at the 25th kilometre of the Belgrade–Zagreb highway. Also killed with him were his Partizan team-mate Bruno Belin, Radnički player Vladimir Josipović and Yugoslav national swimming team member Boris Škanata.

== Legacy ==
The FK Partizan Academy is named in his honour.

== Honours ==
Partizan

- Yugoslav First League: 1948–49
- Yugoslav Cup: 1952, 1954, 1957
