= Branko Nadoveza =

Serbian footballer (1950–1970)

Personal information
- Date of birth: 11 September 1950
- Place of birth: Zemun, FPR Yugoslavia
- Date of death: 12 October 1970 (aged 20)
- Place of death: Belgrade, SFR Yugoslavia
- Position: Left-back

Youth career
- 1962–1969: Partizan

Senior career*
Years	Team	Apps	(Gls)
1969–1970	Partizan	21	(0)
- * Club domestic league appearances and goals

Branko Nadoveza (Serbian Cyrillic: Бранко Надовеза; 11 September 1950 – 12 October 1970) was a Serbian footballer who played for FK Partizan.

== Death and legacy ==
He died on 12 October 1970 after succumbing to injuries he received in a car accident in the Dušanovac neighbourhood of Belgrade two days prior. The FK Partizan Academy is named in his honour.
