= Tamás Kertész =

Hungarian footballer

Tamás Kertész (1 April 1929 – 2 March 1989) was a Hungarian football player who played for Ferencváros in the 50's and DVSC in the 60's. He played 2 games for the Hungary national team in 1955 (in the so-called "golden team" featuring also Ferenc Puskas). After his playing career he was coach of the Ghana national football team. His granddaughter is the British tennis player Johanna Konta.
