= Ratko Čolić =

Serbian footballer

Personal information
- Date of birth: 17 March 1918
- Place of birth: Ub, Kingdom of Serbia
- Date of death: October 30, 1999 (aged 81)
- Place of death: Belgrade, FR Yugoslavia
- Position: Defender

Senior career*
Years	Team	Apps	(Gls)
- Jedinstvo Ub
- Dušanovac
- Mitić Beograd
1946–1956	Partizan	122	(0)

International career
1949–1951	Yugoslavia	14	(0)
Medal record
Men's Football
Representing Yugoslavia
Olympic Games
Silver medal – second place	1952 Helsinki	Team
- * Club domestic league appearances and goals

Ratko Čolić (Serbian Cyrillic: Ратко Чолић; 17 March 1918 – 30 October 1999) was a Serbian footballer.

Čolić made his debut for Yugoslavia in a June 1949 friendly match against Norway and earned a total of 14 caps (no goals). He was part of the national football team at the 1950 FIFA World Cup and also of Yugoslavia's squad at the 1952 Summer Olympics, but he did not play in any matches in either tournament. His final international was a September 1951 friendly against Sweden.
