= Jovan Cokić =

Serbian footballer (1927–2004)

Personal information
- Full name: Jovan Cokić
- Date of birth: 19 August 1927
- Place of birth: Valjevo, Kingdom of Yugoslavia
- Date of death: 6 February 2004 (aged 76)
- Place of death: Elizabeth, New Jersey, United States
- Position: Midfielder

Senior career*
| Years | Team | Apps | (Gls) |
| 1948–1949 | Red Star Belgrade | 5 | (0) |
| 1950–1953 | BSK Belgrade | 52 | (7) |
| 1953–1958 | Red Star Belgrade | 68 | (15) |

International career
| 1952–1955 | Yugoslavia | 2 | (1) |
- * Club domestic league appearances and goals

Jovan Cokić (Serbian Cyrillic: Јован Цокић; 19 August 1927 – 6 February 2004) was a Serbian footballer, who was capped twice by Yugoslavia.

== External sources ==
- Jovan Cokić at Reprezentacija.rs (in Serbian)
- Jovan Cokić at National-Football-Teams.com
