= Anton Rudinski =

Serbian footballer (1937–2017)

Personal information
- Date of birth: 1 October 1937
- Place of birth: Subotica, Kingdom of Yugoslavia
- Date of death: 7 October 2017 (aged 80)
- Place of death: Villingen-Schwenningen, Germany
- Position: Forward

Youth career
- 1950–1952: Bačka Subotica

Senior career*
Years	Team	Apps	(Gls)
1952–1953	Spartak Subotica	17	(6)
1953–1962	Red Star Belgrade	147	(57)
1962–1964	Partizan	9	(6)
1964	Olimpija Ljubljana		
1965–1966	FC Winterthur		
1966–1967	Metz	31	(14)
1967–1968	Viktoria Köln	10	(3)
1968–1969	FC Monthey		

International career
1952	Yugoslavia	1	(0)

Managerial career
- 1972–1974: FC Villingen
- 1975–1977: Waldhof Mannheim
- 1977–1979: Offenburger FV
- 1979–1980: Freiburger FC
- 1980–1981: Lugano
- 1982–1984: SpVgg Bayreuth
- 1984–1986: SC Freiburg
- 1987–1988: VfL Osnabrück
- 1988: Panachaiki
- 1989: SpVgg Bayreuth
- 1990–1991: Offenburger FV
- 2002–2004: 1. FC Schweinfurt
- 2005: FC Konstanz
- * Club domestic league appearances and goals

Anton Rudinski (Serbian Cyrillic: Антон Рудински; 1 October 1937 – 7 October 2017) was a Yugoslav football manager and player who played as a forward. With Red Star Belgrade he won four national Championships (1956, 1957, 1959, 1960), two Yugoslav Cups (1958, 1959) and Danube Cup (1958). With Partizan he also won national Championship (1963).

He only played one match for the Yugoslavia national team on 2 November 1952 against Egypt in a 5–0 win in Belgrade, aged 15 years 32 days old; hence being the youngest European player ever.
