= Slavko Stojanović =

Croatian footballer

Personal information
- Full name: Slavko Stojanović
- Date of birth: 1 June 1930
- Place of birth: Osijek, Kingdom of Yugoslavia
- Date of death: 3 December 2012 (aged 82)
- Place of death: Worms, Germany
- Position: Goalkeeper

Senior career*
Years	Team	Apps	(Gls)
1945–1947	Udarnik Osijek		
1947–1951	Proleter Osijek		
1952–1960	Partizan	135	(1)
1960–1962	Rijeka	13	(0)
1962–1969	Wormatia Worms	148	(1)

International career
1952–1958	Yugoslavia	8	(0)

Managerial career
- 1969: Germania Eich
- 1974: Wormatia Worms
- * Club domestic league appearances and goals

Slavko "Vavo" Stojanović (1 June 1930 – 3 December 2012) was a Croatian football goalkeeper.

== Club career ==
Stojanović started playing in his hometown clubs Udarnik and Proleter, the predecessors of today's NK Osijek, before moving to Belgrade, in 1952, to play in FK Partizan where he would play until 1960, winning three national Cups, in 1952, 1954 and 1957 and playing a total of 382 matches, 135 First League, and even scoring one goal in the 1956–57 season. It was in this period that he became known as one of the best country's goalkeepers, receiving, in 1952, his first, of a total of eight, caps for the Yugoslavia national football team. After nine years playing with the "black & whites", in 1960 he moved to another top league club, NK Rijeka, where he would play two seasons, until 1962. Then he decided to move abroad, signing with the 2. German Bundesliga club Wormatia Worms where he would stay until 1969, playing a total of 148 league matches (157 in all competitions) and curiously scoring also once, in the 1963–64 season.

After retiring, he kept his links with football, he had some coaching experiences with low league club Germania Eich, in 1969, right after finishing his playing career, and also with his former club, Wormatia Worms in 1974.

== International career ==
Curiously, it was against Austria that Stojanović played both his debut and farewell matches. The first was played in 1952, in Belgrade on 21 September, finishing with a 4–2 win, and the second, the farewell, was played on 14 September 1958, in Vienna, finishing also with a Yugoslav victory, this time by a result of 4–3. Yugoslavia didn't lose any of the eight matches that Stojanović played.
