= Ranko Borozan =

Yugoslav footballer (1933–2020)

Personal information
- Date of birth: 25 July 1933
- Place of birth: Mostar, Kingdom of Yugoslavia
- Date of death: 2 April 2020 (aged 86)
- Height: 1.74 m (5 ft 9 in)
- Position: Defender

Senior career*
Years	Team	Apps	(Gls)
1950–1954	Velež Mostar	70	(10)
1954–1957	Partizan Belgrade	43	(3)
1957–1959	Red Star Belgrade	27	(0)
1960	OFK Beograd	9	(2)
1962–1963	Jedinstvo Zemun	1	(0)

International career
	Yugoslavia U21	7	(0)
	Yugoslavia B	1	(0)
- * Club domestic league appearances and goals

Ranko Borozan (25 July 1933 – 2 April 2020) was a Yugoslav footballer who played as a defender in the Yugoslav First League for Velež Mostar, Partizan Belgrade, Red Star Belgrade, and OFK Belgrade during the 1950s.

== Club career ==
Borozan was born in Mostar.

He played for Partizan Belgradea total of 43 league matches having scored 3 goals between 1954 and 1957. He played for Red Star a total of 22 league matches between 1957 and 1960. He played half-season for OFK Belgrade, in 1959–60 having played nine matches and scored twice.

He played with Partizan against Sporting CP in the kick-off match of the European competitions, held in Belgrade on 3 September 1955 for the Champions Cup.

With Partizan Borozan won two Yugoslav Cups (1954, 1957), with Red Star Belgrade he won two Yugoslav Championships (1959, 1960), two Yugoslav Cups (1958, 1959) and Danube Cup (1958).

He later played with Red Star Belgrade, and during the winter break of the 1959–60 season, he moved to OFK Belgrade. His career was interrupted then due to an injury, and despite joining Jedinstvo Zemun two years later for the 1962–63 season, he never really retook his career again.

== International career ==
Borozan played seven matches for the Yugoslavia U-21 team and played once for Yugoslav B national team.

== Personal life ==
He died on 2 April 2020, aged 86.
