= Bruno Belin =

Croatian footballer

Personal information
- Full name: Bruno Belin
- Date of birth: 16 January 1929
- Place of birth: Zagreb, Kingdom of SCS
- Date of death: 20 October 1962 (aged 33)
- Place of death: Belgrade, FPR Yugoslavia
- Position: Defender

Youth career
- HAŠK
- 1945–1947: Metalac Zagreb

Senior career*
Years	Team	Apps	(Gls)
1947–1950	Metalac Zagreb		
1951–1962	Partizan	205	(10)

International career
1952–1959	Yugoslavia	25	(0)
- * Club domestic league appearances and goals

Bruno Belin (16 January 1929 – 20 October 1962) was a Croatian and Yugoslav footballer best remembered for his time with Partizan between the early 1950s and the early 1960s. He was also part of the Yugoslavia squad at the 1954 FIFA World Cup, where they reached the quarter-finals.

== Club career ==
He started his career at Zagreb based NK Metalac and after completing his military service in 1950 he joined Belgrade-based giants FK Partizan where he won one national championship and 3 cup titles. Belin played a total of 463 games for Partizan with 41 goals scored. He was considered one of the best Yugoslav defenders at the time he played, and he especially stood out for his technique, quickness and calmness in the game.

== International career ==
He made his debut for Yugoslavia in a December 1952 friendly match against West Germany and earned a total of 25 caps scoring no goals. His final international was a May 1959 European Nations' Cup qualifying match against Bulgaria.

== Death and legacy ==
After retiring from playing in 1961 he became a youth coach at Partizan.

He died in a car crash in October 1962 on the Belgrade-Zagreb highway, together with Partizan defender Čedomir Lazarević, water polo player Boris Škanata and Radnički Beograd player Vladimir Josipović. The FK Partizan Academy, commonly known as "Belin–Lazarević–Nadoveza youth school" is named in his honour.

Belin's younger brother Rudolf (1942–2025) was also an accomplished footballer and a Yugoslav international, who won three Marshal Tito Cups with Dinamo Zagreb in the 1960s.

== Honours ==
Partizan

- Yugoslav First League: 1960–61
- Yugoslav Cup: 1952, 1954, 1957
