= Antun Herceg =

Yugoslav football manager and player (1927–2013)

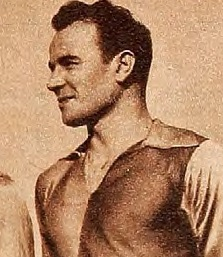

Personal information
- Date of birth: 9 November 1927
- Place of birth: Inđija, Kingdom of Serbs, Croats and Slovenes
- Date of death: 16 April 2013 (aged 85)
- Place of death: Backnang, Germany
- Position: Left winger

Senior career*
Years	Team	Apps	(Gls)
1949–1950	Sloga Novi Sad	8	(2)
1951–1958	Partizan	141	(38)
1960	Proleter Zrenjanin	4	(0)
1962–1965	TSG Backnang		
Total		153	(40)

International career
1950–1957	Yugoslavia	12	(2)

Managerial career
- 1962–1965: TSG Backnang (player-manager)
- 1970–1971: TSG Backnang
- * Club domestic league appearances and goals

Antun Herceg (Serbian Cyrillic: Антун Херцег; 9 November 1927 – 16 April 2013) was a Yugoslav football manager and player.

== Club career ==
Following his stint in the Yugoslav Second League with Sloga Novi Sad (later reverted to Vojvodina), Herceg played regularly for Partizan from 1951 to 1958, making 141 appearances and scoring 38 goals in the Yugoslav First League. He also helped the club win the Yugoslav Cup on three occasions (1952, 1954, and 1956–57).

== International career ==
At international level, Herceg played 12 times and scored two goals for Yugoslavia. He made his national team debut in a 2–1 friendly win against Sweden on 3 September 1950, netting the winning goal. His final cap came on 5 May 1957 in a World Cup qualifier against Greece that ended in a goalless draw.

== Managerial career ==
In the summer of 1970, Herceg returned to TSG Backnang as manager, having previously served as the club's player-manager from 1962 to 1965.

== Career statistics ==
=== Club ===
Appearances and goals by club, season and competition
Club	Season	League		
Club	Season	Division	Apps	Goals
Sloga Novi Sad	1950	Yugoslav Second League	8	2
Partizan	1951	Yugoslav First League	9	3
Partizan	1952	Yugoslav First League	16	9
Partizan	1952–53	Yugoslav First League	19	7
Partizan	1953–54	Yugoslav First League	24	7
Partizan	1954–55	Yugoslav First League	20	2
Partizan	1955–56	Yugoslav First League	24	5
Partizan	1956–57	Yugoslav First League	18	1
Partizan	1957–58	Yugoslav First League	11	4
Partizan	Total		141	38
Proleter Zrenjanin	1959–60	Yugoslav Second League	4	0
Career total			153	40

=== International ===
Appearances and goals by national team and year
National team	Year	Apps	Goals
Yugoslavia	1950	4	2
Yugoslavia	1951	2	0
Yugoslavia	1952	1	0
Yugoslavia	1953	1	0
Yugoslavia	1954	1	0
Yugoslavia	1955	0	0
Yugoslavia	1956	2	0
Yugoslavia	1957	1	0
Total		12	2

== Honours ==
Partizan

- Yugoslav Cup: 1952, 1954, 1956–57
