= Miodrag Jovanović (footballer, born 1922) =

Serbian footballer

Miodrag Jovanović Миодраг Јовановић
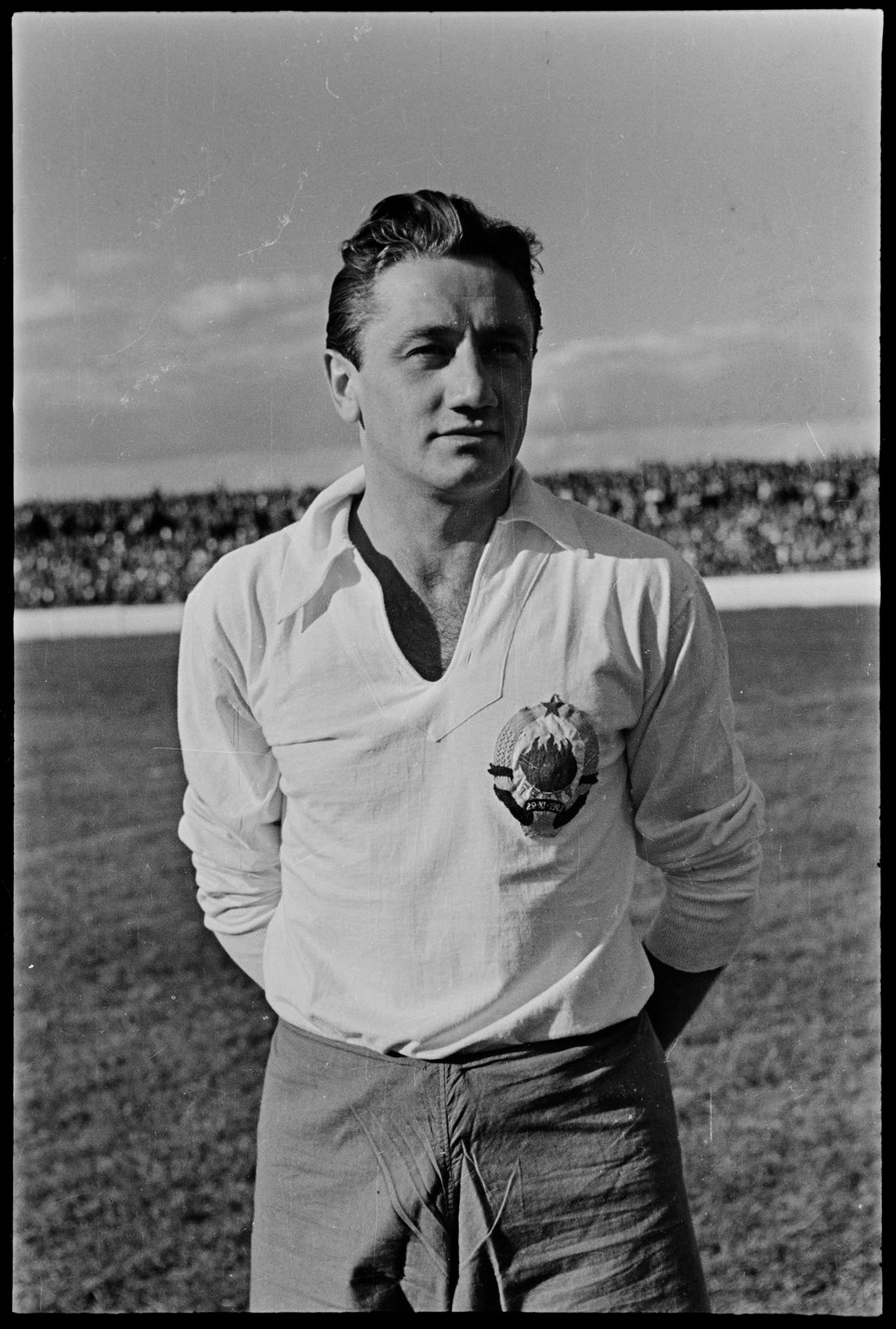

Personal information
- Date of birth: 17 January 1922
- Place of birth: Belgrade, Kingdom of Serbs, Croats and Slovenes
- Date of death: 14 December 2009 (aged 87)
- Place of death: Belgrade, Serbia
- Positions: Defender; midfielder

Youth career
- BSK Beograd

Senior career*
Years	Team	Apps	(Gls)
1945–1946	USA-OS		
1945–1946	Red Star Belgrade		
1946–1947	Metalac Beograd	9	(0)
1947–1956	Partizan	148	(1)

International career
1947–1950	Yugoslavia	25	(0)

Managerial career
- 1961–1963: Hapoel Petah Tikva
- 1963–1967: Hapoel Haifa
- 1967–1969: Olimpija Ljubljana
- 1969–1970: Budućnost Peć
- 1970–1971: Mladi Radnik
Medal record
Representing Yugoslavia
Men's Football
Silver medal – second place	1948 London	Team competition
- * Club domestic league appearances and goals

Miodrag "Minda" Jovanović (Serbian Cyrillic: Миодраг Јовановић; 17 January 1922 – 14 December 2009) was a Yugoslav footballer.

== International career ==
On the national level, Jovanović made his debut for Yugoslavia in a September 1947 Balkan Cup game against Albania and earned a total of 25 caps (no goals). He was part of the Yugoslav squad at the 1948 Summer Olympics and the 1950 FIFA World Cup. His final international was a November 1950 friendly match against Norway.
