= Stanoje Jocić =

Serbian footballer

Personal information
- Date of birth: 5 June 1932 (age 94)
- Place of birth: Skopje, Kingdom of Yugoslavia
- Position: Forward

Senior career*
Years	Team	Apps	(Gls)
1952–1953	BSK Belgrade	35	(21)
1954–1957	Partizan	43	(16)
1957–1959	OFK Belgrade	17	(11)
1959–1960	Čelik		
1960–1961	Hajduk Split	2	(0)
Total		97	(48)

International career
1952–1954	Yugoslavia	4	(2)
- * Club domestic league appearances and goals

Stanoje Jocić (Serbian Cyrillic: Станоје Јоцић; born 5 June 1932) is a Serbian retired football player and a Yugoslav international.

== Club career ==
Born in Skopje in present-day North Macedonia, Jocić came to football relatively late, joining Belgrade-based's BSK youth academy in 1948, at the age of 16. He had his professional debut in the 1952 season, in which he was Yugoslav league's top goalscorer with 13 goals in 13 appearances for BSK.

He left BSK in 1954 and went on to have a three-season spell with cross-city rivals FK Partizan, for whom he scored 16 goals in 43 league appearances, before returning to his original club in 1957 (which had been renamed in the meantime OFK Belgrade). He spent two more seasons with OFK, including the 1958–59 season which the club spent in the Yugoslav Second League, before retiring in 1959.

== International career ==
Jocić was also capped for the Yugoslavia national football team four times between 1952 and 1954, all in friendlies, and scored two goals for the national team. He scored both goals in his debut on 2 November 1952 against Egypt at the JNA Stadium in Belgrade, a 5–0 win for Yugoslavia.
