= Prvoslav Mihajlović =

Yugoslav footballer

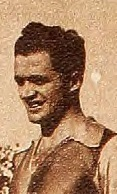

Personal information
- Date of birth: 13 April 1921
- Place of birth: Valjevo, Kingdom of Serbs, Croats and Slovenes
- Date of death: 28 June 1978 (aged 57)
- Place of death: Belgrade, SFR Yugoslavia
- Position: Midfielder

Senior career*
Years	Team	Apps	(Gls)
1938–1941	Valjevo SK		
1941	Obilić		
1942–1944	BSK Beograd		
1945–1950	Partizan	56	(32)
1951	Red Star Belgrade	0	(0)
1952–1957	Partizan	83	(28)

International career
1946–1950	Yugoslavia	13	(6)

Managerial career
- 1957–1959: OFK Beograd
- 1959–1961: Partizan (technical adviser)
- 1961–1963: Yugoslavia (jointly)
- 1963–1966: Al Ittihad Alexandria
- 1966: Karşıyaka
- 1966–1967: Preußen Münster
Medal record
Representing Yugoslavia
Men's football
Silver medal – second place	1948 London	Team competition
- * Club domestic league appearances and goals

Prvoslav Mihajlović (Serbian Cyrillic: Првослав Михајловић; 13 April 1921 – 28 June 1978) was a Yugoslav footballer and head coach.

== Biography ==
On the national level he played for Yugoslavia national team (13 matches/6 goals) and was a participant at the 1948 Olympic Games, where his team won a silver medal, and at the 1950 FIFA World Cup. With Partizan he won 2 national championships (1947, 1949) and 4 Yugoslav cups (1947, 1952, 1954, 1957). During 1951. Mihajlović played 10 friendly matches on loan for Red Star in two months and after that he came back to Partizan.

Mihajlović later worked as a football manager and coached several teams, including OFK Beograd and Yugoslavia national team, which he led at the 1962 FIFA World Cup. He also worked as assistant coach in Partizan (1959–1963) and won 3 national championships (1961, 1962, 1963).

He was the secretary and technical director of FK Partizan (1959–1963), then worked in Alexandria, Egypt (1963–1966) and Karşıyaka, Turkey (1966) and Münster, West Germany (1966–1967). He also worked in Kuwait.

Father to Olga (Lola) Nikolov, and Grandfather to Andrei Prvoslav Nikolov, Tatjana Sloat and Katarina Martinez currently residing in the United States.
