= FK Partizan in European football =

- Club: FK Partizan
- First entry: 1955–56 European Cup
- Latest entry: 2026–27 UEFA Conference League

FK Partizan is a professional football club based in Belgrade, Serbia. Founded in 1945, they were the first Yugoslav and Serbian club ever to enter European competition, playing the European Cup in the 1955–56 season. They opened the competition in a match against Sporting CP on 4 September 1955. They also became the first club that was not from Western Europe to play in the European Cup final, losing by Real Madrid in 1966.

Including all European competitions, midfielder Saša Ilić holds the club record for the most appearances with 114, and is also the club's third-highest ever goalscorer with 15 goals, behind Brazilian striker Cléo, who scored 16 goals, and Ricardo Gomes, who scored 20.

== Best results in European competitions ==
Season	Achievement	Notes
European Cup / UEFA Champions League
1955–56	Quarter Final	eliminated by (Spain) Real Madrid 0–4 in Madrid, 3–0 in Belgrade
1963–64	Quarter Final	eliminated by (Italy) Internazionale 0–2 in Belgrade, 1–2 in Milano
1965–66	Runners-up	lost to (Spain) Real Madrid 1–2 in Brussels
Mitropa Cup
1977–78	Winner	defeated (Hungary) Budapest Honvéd 1–0 in Belgrade
UEFA Cup Winners' Cup
1989–90	Quarter Final	eliminated by (Romania) Dinamo București 1–2 in Bucharest, 0–2 in Titograd*
UEFA Cup / Europa League
1974–75	Round of 16	eliminated by (West Germany) 1. FC Köln 1–0 in Belgrade, 1–5 in Cologne
1984–85	Round of 16	eliminated by (Hungary) Videoton 0–5 in Székesfehérvár, 2–0 in Belgrade
1990–91	Round of 16	eliminated by (Italy) Internazionale 0–3 in Milan, 1–1 in Belgrade
2004–05	Round of 16	eliminated by (Russia) CSKA Moscow 1–1 in Belgrade, 0–2 in Krasnodar*
UEFA Europa Conference League
2021–22	Round of 16	eliminated by (Netherlands) Feyenoord 2–5 in Belgrade, 1–3 in Rotterdam

- This match was played at Pod Goricom Stadium in Titograd instead of at Partizan's home ground in Belgrade since UEFA barred Partizan again from playing home matches within a 300 km radius of their home ground after more crowd trouble in the previous round's home tie against Groningen.
- This match was played at Krasnodar instead at Moscow due to poor weather conditions.

Biggest win in UEFA competition:

Season	Match	Score
UEFA Champions League
2009–10	Partizan – Rhyl	8–0
1999–00	Partizan – Flora	6–0
1965–66	Partizan – Sparta Prague	5–0
UEFA Europa League
2001–02	Partizan – Santa Coloma	7–1
1988–89	Partizan – Slavia Sofia	5–0
1974–75	Partizan – Portadown	5–0

=== By competition ===
Fully up to date as of match played 27 August 2026

Competition	Pld	W	D	L	GF	GA	GD	Win%
European Cup/UEFA Champions League	107	41	24	42	163	142	+21	38.32
Cup Winners' Cup	12	4	1	7	19	21	−2	33.33
UEFA Cup/UEFA Europa League	155	61	34	60	219	211	+8	39.35
UEFA Europa Conference League	42	21	7	14	66	53	+13	50.00
Inter-Cities Fairs Cup	8	2	3	3	10	14	−4	25.00
Total	324	129	69	126	477	441	+36	39.81

== History ==
=== Yugoslav period: (1955–1991) ===
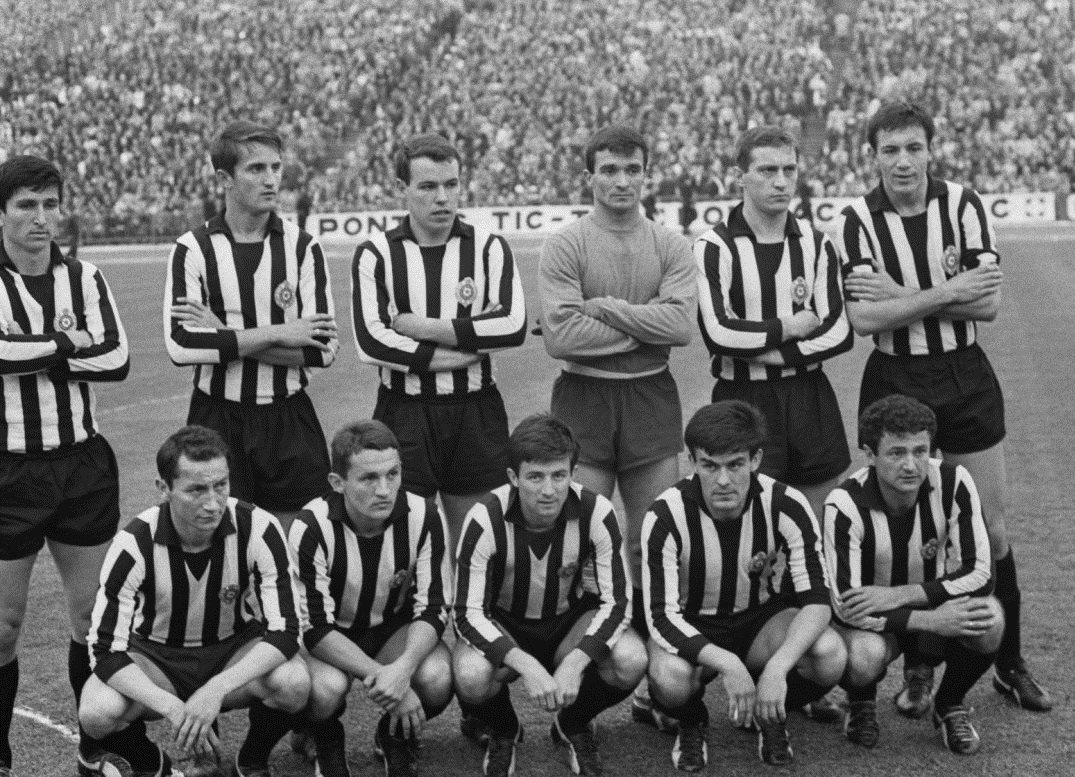
Real Madrid – Partizan, 1966 European Cup Final

1966 European Cup Final starting lineup (coach: Abdulah Gegić), on 11 May 1966

In Yugoslav period, Partizan made great success in European competitions. Certainly the greatest success was achieved in 1965–66 season, when Partizan's babies reached the 1966 European Cup final. During that period, Partizan played in European Cup, Inter-Cities Fairs Cup and UEFA Cup.

On 4 September 1955, Partizan participated in the first ever Champions Cup match, in Lisbon against Sporting CP. The final result was 3–3, with Miloš Milutinović becoming the first scorer in a most prestigious club competition in Europe. In return leg, Partizan defeated Sporting 5–2 and reached quarter-finals. Miloš Milutinović scored four goals on that match. In quarter-finals, Partizan played against Real Madrid (who later won the competition). In first match, Real Madrid defeated Partizan 4–0 in front of 105,000 fans at the Santiago Bernabéu Stadium. In return leg, Partizan won 3–0. Miloš Milutinović with eight goals was top scorer in European Cup.

The 1965–66 European Cup campaign was the crown of this generation's career. After eliminating French Nantes (2–0, 2–2) and German champion Werder Bremen (3–0, 1–0) in the first two rounds, Partizan were drawn against Sparta Prague in the quarter-finals. In the first leg, held in Prague, Partizan suffered a hard 4–1 defeat. Although they were not given any chances in the return leg in Belgrade, Partizan pulled off a convincing 5–0 win in front of 50,000 spectators, and with aggregate score 6–4 qualified for the semifinals. The semi-finals would see Partizan taking part in an emotional tie that would bring Manchester United, in their first season back in the European Cup after the Munich air disaster, returning to the scene of their final game, at the JNA Stadium, before embarking on that fateful journey home (on the way home from a European Cup quarter-final victory against Red Star, which was played at JNA Stadium, the aircraft carrying the Manchester United players, officials and journalists crashed while attempting to take off after refuelling in Munich).Manchester United, led by George Best and Bobby Charlton, awaited finally them on the last step to the finals. Partizan won the first leg at JNA Stadium 2–0, and resisted the heavy pressure on Old Trafford, conceding only once; with a 2–1 aggregate scoreline, they eliminated the English giants. Partizan's babies achieved the greatest success in history of Partizan, a place in the 1966 European Cup final against Real Madrid. The final game was played on 11 May at Heysel Stadium, Brussels. Until the 70th minute, Partizan was 1–0 up through a goal by Velibor Vasović, but ultimately lost to the Spaniards 2–1. Partizan may have come close to a famous victory, but they had now missed their chance as the side was immediately broken up with their star players heading west. Still, Partizan became the first club from the Balkans and Eastern Europe to have played in a European Cup final.

Partizan finished the season in Yugoslav League on 11th place and did not play in next season in European competitions. In 1967–68 season, Partizan played first time in Inter-Cities Fairs Cup and eliminate Lokomotiv Plovdiv (5–1, 1–1) in first round, but they were stopped in second round by Leeds United (1–2, 1–1). Next season Partizan again not played in European competitions, but in next two season they were played in Inter-Cities Fairs Cup and eliminated in first round by Újpest Dózsa by an aggregate score of 2–3 and Dynamo Dresden, with an aggregate score of 0–6.

In 1974–75 season, Partizan played first time in UEFA Cup and reached third round. In first and second round, Partizan beat 5–2 on aggregate Górnik Zabrze and Portadown 6–1. In third round, they were eliminated by 1. FC Köln 2–5 on aggregate.

Partizan finished the 1974–75 in Yugoslav League on 6th place and did not play in next season in European competitions. In 1976–77 season, Partizan after eleven years played in European Cup. The first match after more than one decade, Partizan played in Kiev, versus Soviet Union champion Dynamo Kyiv and lost 0–3. Two weeks later, in Belgrade, Partizan played on Red Star Belgrade stadium, Marakana. The match was played on this stadium because of great interest. Partizan lost 0–2 in front of 70,000 fans.

Partizan also skipped one season in European competitions, because has finished on 4th place in league. In 1978–79 season, Partizan played against champion of East Germany, Dynamo Dresden. Partizan won first match 2–0 at home, but lost in Dresden also 2–0. Dynamo eliminated Partizan after a penalty shootout, 5–4.

Partizan qualified for 1983–84 European Cup, as champion of Yugoslavia. Partizan eliminated Norway champion Viking 5–1 on aggregate (5–1 at home, 0–0 in Stavanger). In second round, Dynamo Berlin eliminate Partizan 1–2 on aggregate (0–2 in Berlin, 1–0 at home).

In next season, Partizan has reached the success like of exactly a decade earlier, third round (round of 16) of UEFA Cup. In the first round, they were eliminated Rabat Ajax 4–0 on aggregate (2–0 on Malta, 2–0 at home). That away victory is first Partizan's victory in European competitions after 21 year. In the second round, Partizan eliminated Queens Park Rangers on away goals rule (6–6 on aggregate). QPR won the first leg 6–2, but Partizan advanced after a 4–0 return victory in Belgrade. A goal which Dragan Mance scored against the English side is considered as one of the most remarkable goals in the history of Partizan. That match was voted 70th among the Top 100 greatest matches in the history of football in a poll organized by Eurosport in September 2009. In the third round, Videoton eliminate Partizan 2–5 on aggregate. Videoton won 5–0 first leg in Székesfehérvár. Partizan won 2–0 in Belgrade, but that's victory was not enough to pass in quarter-finals. Next season, Partizan reached the second round of UEFA Cup, were they eliminated by Nantes 1–5 on aggregate (1–1 at home, 0–4 in Nantes). In first round, Partizan eliminated Portimonense 4–1 on aggregate (0–1 in Portimão, 4–0 at home).

In next two seasons, Partizan is eliminated in first round of UEFA Cup: in 1986–87 by Borussia Mönchengladbach 1–4 on aggregate, and in 1987–88 by Flamurtari 2–3 on aggregate. In 1988–89 season, Partizan eliminated Slavia Sofia 10–0 on aggregate (5–0 at home, 5–0 in Sofia). In the second round, they were stopped by Roma. First leg Partizan won 4–2, but in the second leg, Roma won 2–0 and eliminated Partizan on away goals rule.

As the national cup winners, they qualified for the 1989–90 European Cup Winners' Cup. In the first round, they were eliminated Celtic 6–6 on aggregate, on away goals rule. First match Partizan won 2–1 in Mostar, but lost in 4–5 Glasgow. The return match with Celtic is one of the most famous and most exciting in history of Partizan and Yugoslav football. In the second round they met with Groningen. The first leg Groningen won 4–3, but in Belgrade Partizan won 3–1 and secured place in quarter-finals. Dinamo București eliminate Partizan in quarter-finals 1–4 on aggregate (1–2 in Bucharest 0–2 in Titograd). The return leg was played at Pod Goricom Stadium in Titograd instead of at Partizan's home ground in Belgrade since UEFA barred Partizan again from playing home matches within a 300 km radius of their home ground after more crowd trouble in the previous round's home tie against Groningen.

In 1990–91 season, Partizan reached the third round of UEFA Cup. In the first round, they were eliminated Hibernians 5–0 on aggregate (3–0 on Malta, 2–0 at home). In the second round, Partizan eliminated Real Sociedad after a penalty shoot-out. Real Sociedad won the first leg 1–0 in San Sebastián, but Partizan after a 1–0 return victory in Belgrade and after a penalty shoot-out reached third round. In the third round, Internazionale eliminate Partizan 1–4 on aggregate. Inter won 3–0 first leg in Milan. Partizan drew 1–1 in Belgrade in the return leg.

The 1991–92 season was last season before UEFA ban on clubs from FR Yugoslavia. Partizan was eliminated in the first round by Sporting de Gijón. Sporting won the first leg in Gijón 2–0, but Partizan won two weeks later in Istanbul by the same result. Sporting eliminated Partizan after a penalty shoot-out. The return leg was played in Istanbul because of sanctions.

In Yugoslav period, the biggest Partizan's success was of course 1966 European Cup Final. In UEFA Cup, they reached third round (round of 16) three times and played one in European Cup Winners' Cup (1989–90), where they reached the quarterfinals. In that period, Partizan won 29 of 39 matches at home and only won 4 in away.

=== Dark decade (1990s) ===
In 1997, Partizan was reintroduced to European competitions following the lift of the UEFA ban on clubs from FR Yugoslavia, but while the national team continued where they had stopped in the spring of 1992, the clubs had all their results erased and were treated as the beginners in the European competitions.

After the ban, Partizan entered in 1996–97 UEFA Cup. In the first match, the Black-Whites played on 17 July 1996 against Maccabi Haifa and won 1–0 by Đorđe Svetličić goal in 10th minute. In return leg, Partizan defeated Maccabi 3–1 and reached the next round. In next round, they were eliminated by Național București 0–1 on aggregate. In that season, Partizan won the title and earned a place in 1997–98 UEFA Champions League. In the first qualifying round, they were eliminated by Croatia Zagreb 1–5 on aggregate. In the first match in Belgrade, Partizan defeated their opponent by Dragan Isailović goal in 84th minute, but lost in Zagreb 0–5 and experienced one of the biggest losses in history on the European scene.

The 1998–99 season was one of the most successful during the 1990s. Partizan reached the second round of the UEFA Cup Winners' Cup. In qualifying round, Partizan eliminated Dinamo Batumi 2–1 on aggregate and Newcastle United 2–2 on away goals rule in the first round. In second round, they were eliminated by Lazio 2–3 on aggregate.

=== The new beginning (2000–2009) ===
In 2000–01 season, in qualifying round, Partizan eliminated Sliema Wanderers 5–3 on aggregate. The first match Silema won 2–1, but in return leg Partizan won 4–1 and secured place in first round of UEFA Cup. In first round they were drawn with Porto. The first match in Belgrade has ended 1–1, but in return leg Dragons won 1–0 and eliminated Partizan. In 2001–02 season, in qualifying round, Partizan eliminated Santa Coloma 8–1 on aggregate. Partizan won 7–1 in return leg in Belgrade and made one of the biggest victories in club history on European scene. In first round, Partizan defeated Rapid Wien 1–0 in first match, but Rapid won the return leg 5–1 in Vienna, and Partizan were again eliminated in the first round. Partizan defeated Hammarby IF 5–1 on aggregate in second qualifying round for 2002–03 UEFA Champions League, but lost 1–6 on aggregate in third qualifying round from Bayern Munich. Partizan then continued European story in UEFA Cup. In first round of UEFA Cup, they eliminated Sporting CP 6–4 on aggregate. Partizan won first match in Lisbon 3–1 and draw the second leg 3–3 at home. In first match of second round, Partizan defeated Slavia Prague 3–1, but Slavia won in return leg 1–5 in Prague and Partizan failed to reach final phase.

The club's management took the 2003 season very seriously, appointing as its new coach the former World Player of the Year Lothar Matthäus, and brought some top and experienced players like Taribo West from 1.FC Kaiserslautern, Ljubinko Drulović from Benfica and Tomasz Rząsa from Feyenoord. For the first time in its history, the club played in the UEFA Champions League after eliminating Bobby Robson's Newcastle United. In Belgrade, Partizan lost by 0–1, but in a rematch at St James' Park, they won by Ivica Iliev's goal in regular time and reached the group stages after a penalty shoot-out. Later on, Partizan was drawn in a tough group with Real Madrid (the previous year's Champions League semi-finalist), Porto (the winner of the 2002–03 UEFA Cup and the eventual winner of the competition) and Marseille (the eventual runners-up of the 2003–04 UEFA Cup). The Partizan Stadium was a tough ground for the opposition and the team did not lost a home game, playing out a 0–0 draw with Real Madrid's famous Galácticos, which included players such as Zinedine Zidane, Ronaldo, Luís Figo, Roberto Carlos, Raúl and David Beckham; a 1–1 draw with Porto, led by coach José Mourinho; and Marseille, with its superstars Fabien Barthez and Didier Drogba, while playing some inspired football in the away match in Madrid (0–1), Marseille (0–3) and Porto (1–2). They are the first, and so far the only, Serbian team to qualify for the main draw of this elite European club competition since its inception in 1992.

Partizan reached round of 16 in UEFA Cup in 2004–05 season,. The Steamroller started this wonderful European story in second qualifying round, where they were drawn against Romanian team Oţelul Galaţi. After a goalless draw in the first leg in Constanţa, Partizan eliminated opponent two weeks later, in Belgrade, by Srđan Radonjić's goal in 29th minute. Partizan defeated Dinamo București in first round 3–1 on aggregate and securing place in group stage. They were drawn into the Group E alongside Middlesbrough, Villarreal, Lazio and Egaleo. On 4 November 2004, the team played its first match in the group stage of the UEFA Cup and beat 4–0 Egaleo at home. Three weeks later, Partizan draw 2–2 with Lazio in Rome. Partizan lead 2–0 by Pierre Boya's twice after 25 minutes, but Lazio with two goals in second half avoided defeat. In third match, Partizan draw 1–1 with Villarreal at home and secured place into round of 32. The goal for Partizan on that match scored Ivan Tomić from penalty spot in 65th minute. In last match, Partizan lost in Middlesbrough 0–3. On 16 February 2005, Partizan draw 2–2 with Dnipro Dnipropetrovsk at home in first match of round of 32. Obiora Odita scored twice for Steamroller in first half. In return leg, Partizan made great victory in Dnipropetrovsk and reached round of 16. In 88th minute, Miroslav Radović scored one of the most important goals in history of the club. Later on, he was eliminated (1–1 in Belgrade, 0–2 in Krasnodar) by CSKA Moscow, the eventual winner of the competition.

In second qualifying round, Partizan beat 2–0 on aggregate Sheriff Tiraspol and lost on penalty spot from Artmedia Petržalka in third qualifying round for the 2005–06 UEFA Champions League. In first round for 2005–06 UEFA Cup, Partizan was eliminated from Maccabi Petah Tikva, 4–5 on aggregate and did not reach group stage.

After one year, Partizan reached again group stage of UEFA Cup. They eliminated Maribor and Groningen in the qualifying phase. In the group stage, Partizan were drawn against Rangers, Maccabi Haifa, Livorno and Auxerre. They lost three out of four games, only drew with Livorno at home.

In August 2007, Partizan suffered a real shock: UEFA expelled Partizan from the 2007–08 UEFA Cup season and fined the club €30,056 due to crowd trouble at their away qualifying match against Zrinjski Mostar, which forced the match to be interrupted for ten minutes. UEFA judged travelling Partizan fans to have been the culprits of the trouble, but Partizan were allowed to play the return leg while the appeal was being processed. Partizan's appeal, however, was rejected and Zrinjski Mostar qualified for the next round, although Partizan beat them by an aggregate score of 11–1.

Partizan started their 2008–09 European campaign in the second qualifying round of the 2008–09 UEFA Champions League with a 3–1 aggregate victory over Inter Baku. In the third qualifying round, Partizan were eliminated by Fenerbahçe, with an aggregate score of 3–4. In the UEFA Cup first round, Partizan defeated Timișoara 3–1 on aggregate and secured place in group stage. They were drawn into the Group C alongside Sevilla, Stuttgart, Sampdoria and Standard Liège. Partizan lost all four matches and score only one goal. That goal score Lamine Diarra in first match of the group stage, against Sampdoria in Belgrade.

=== Second time in Champions League and group stages of new Europa League (2009–2015) ===
In second qualifying round, Partizan beat 12–0 on aggregate Rhyl. In return leg, Partizan beat Rhyl 8–0 and that's the club's greatest victory in European competitions. Partizan lost against APOEL 1–2 on aggregate (0–2 defeat in Nicosia, 1–0 victory in Belgrade) in third qualifying round for the 2009–10 UEFA Champions League. In play-off round for 2009–10 UEFA Europa League, Partizan defeat 3–1 on aggregate Slovak Champion MŠK Žilina and reach group stage for a consecutive season. They were drawn into the Group J alongside Shakhtar Donetsk, Club Brugge and Toulouse. They lost five out of six games, only won with Shakhtar Donetsk at home 1–0 in last match of the group, by Lamine Diarra goal in 6th minute.

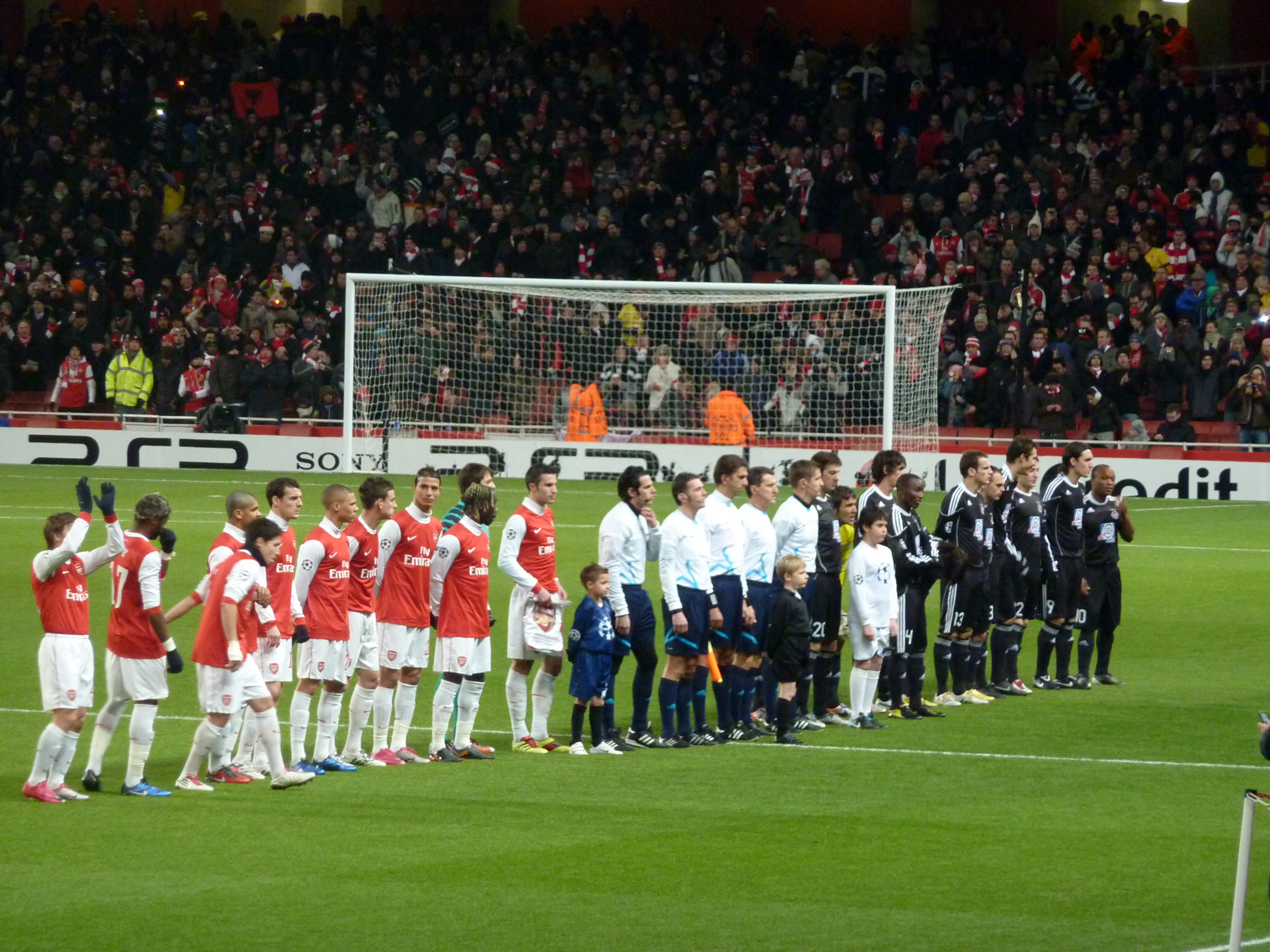
Arsenal – Partizan Belgrade.

After the unsuccessful attempts in the previous seasons, Partizan finally reached the group stages of the Champions League in the 2010–11 season. They eliminated Pyunik, HJK Helsinki and Anderlecht in the qualifying phase. Partizan previously qualified for the group stages only once, in the 2003–04 season. Now, the draw for the group phase decided that Partizan will play in group H, alongside Arsenal, Shakhtar Donetsk (the winner of the 2008–09 UEFA Cup) and Sporting Braga (the eventual runner-up of the 2010–11 UEFA Europa League). On the matchday 1, Partizan lost against Shakhtar on Donbas Arena in Donetsk (0–1). Next game Partizan played against Arsenal at Partizan Stadium and lost 1–3 after they played inspired football with a 10-man team in the last 30 minutes of the match. In two matches against Sporting Braga, Partizan failed to score and they lost both games (0–2 in Braga; 0–1 in Belgrade). The last two rounds in the group have also brought inspired football, but unfortunately it wasn't enough so Shakhtar Donetsk and The Gunners defeated Partizan once again, 0–3 in Belgrade and 1–3 at the Emirates Stadium.

Partizan defeated Shkëndija in the second qualifying round for 2011–12 UEFA Champions League 5–0 on aggregate and were eliminated in the third qualifying round by Genk 3–2 on aggregate. In the play-off round for the 2011–12 UEFA Europa League, Partizan was eliminated by Shamrock Rovers, 3–2 on aggregate and did not reach group stage.

Partizan started their 2012–13 European campaign in the second qualifying round of the 2012–13 UEFA Champions League with a 7–2 aggregate victory over Valletta from Malta. In the third qualifying round, Partizan lost and continued their European season play-off round of the Europa League. In the play-off round, they were eliminated Tromsø and reached group stage. They were drawn into the Group H alongside Internazionale, Rubin Kazan and Neftçi. They obtained three points in six games after a draw against Rubin Kazan and two times against Neftçi.

In second qualifying round for 2013–14 UEFA Champions League Partizan eliminated Shirak (1–1, away goal) and lost against Ludogorets Razgrad (1–3 on aggregate). In play-off round for 2013–14 UEFA Europa League, Partizan played with Thun. Partizan beat Thun 1–0 in Belgrade, but lost 0–3 in Thun and failed to get in Europa League. Without a single trophy and group stage of some European competition, the season was the worst in last ten years in every way.

After a year of absence, Partizan entered at the 2014–15 UEFA Europa League by beating Neftçi total score 5–3 (3–2 at home and 2–1 away). Partizan is after the draw, placed in Group C with Tottenham Hotspur, Beşiktaş and Asteras Tripolis. Partizan began the Europa League in excellent form and remained undefeated against the English giant Tottenham, but in the next four games, the club were defeated. In last match of the group stage, Partizan played a match without goals with Asteras. Partizan scored only one goal in six matches. That one goal score Saša Marković against Beşiktaş on Atatürk Olympic Stadium in Istanbul.

=== Recent years (2015–) ===
The 2015–16 season for Partizan was started on 14 July 2015 by defeating the Georgian team Dila Gori 1–0 in the second round of qualifying for the Champions League. Partizan also won in the return leg (2–0). In the third round Partizan played against Steaua București. In first leg, Partizan remained undefeated in Bucharest (1–1). In return leg, Partizan lost 1–2 at the half-time, and then incredible return on goals by Marko Jevtović, Andrija Živković and Nikola Trujić come to a positive result (4–2) and The Steamroller reach play-off the Champions League after 5 years. In the draw for the play–off for the Champions League, Partizan pulled BATE Borisov. In the first leg in Barysaw, Partizan played second half with a player less and lost 1–0. In return leg, Partizan won 2–1 but BATE qualify for the Champions League on away goals. After falling out of the play–off for the Champions League, Partizan has directly entered the Europa League. Partizan is after the draw, placed in Group L with Athletic Bilbao, AZ Alkmaar and Augsburg. Partizan made three victories in group stage (3–2 at home and 2–1 in away against AZ and 3–1 in Augsburg against same team), but he failed to get in Round of 32. The first victory in group stage, on 17 September against AZ, was first Partizan's victory in group stage of some European competition since 16 December 2009 when the Partizan won against Shakhtar Donetsk 1–0 in Europa League group stage. In group stage Partizan score ten goals and that's exactly like in last three seasons when Partizan score same goals like in this. Nine out of ten goals, has score Aboubakar Oumarou (5) and Andrija Živković (4), and the last one score Fabrício.

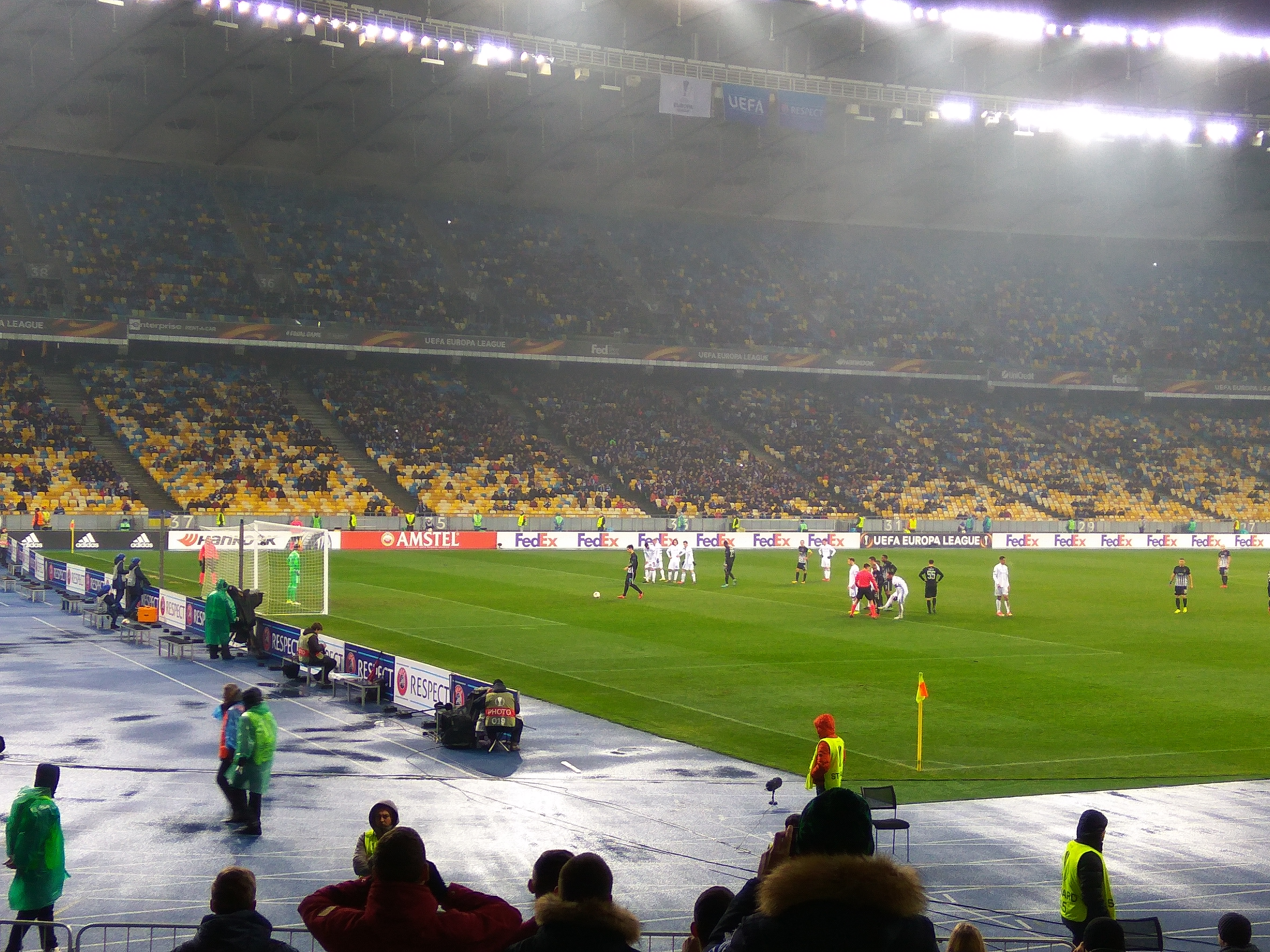
Dynamo Kyiv – Partizan, 7 December 2017

On 14 July 2016, Partizan opened season with a 0–0 home draw against Zagłębie Lubin in second qualifying round for the 2016–17 UEFA Europa League. A week later, in Lubin, after penalty drama Partizan was eliminated.

Partizan began their 2017–18 European campaign in the second qualifying round of the 2017–18 UEFA Champions League, eliminating Montenegrin champions Budućnost Podgorica 2–0 on aggregate. In the third qualifying round Partizan were eliminated by Greek champions Olympiacos, losing 1–3 in Belgrade and drawing 2–2 in Piraeus. In play-off round for 2017–18 UEFA Europa League, Partizan played against Videoton and ex coach Marko Nikolić who won the double in previous season. After 0–0 in Belgrade, Partizan destroyed Videoton 4–0 in Felcsút and reached the group stage. They were drawn into the Group B alongside Dynamo Kyiv, Young Boys and Skënderbeu Korçë. Partizan began the Europa League group stage in Bern and remained undefeated against Young Boys (1–1) at Stade de Suisse. In second match, Partizan lost 2–3 against Dynamo Kyiv in Belgrade. In third match, Partizan and Skënderbeu played a match without goals in Elbasan. On 2 November, Partizan beat Skënderbeu 2-0 and catch up first victory in group stage, thanks to goals by Zoran Tošić and Léandre Tawamba. On 23 November, Partizan defeated Young Boys 2–1, thanks to goals by Léandre Tawamba and Ognjen Ožegović and qualified for the Europa League Round of 32 for the first time after 2004–05 season. In last match of the group, Partizan lost in Kyiv 1–4. Marko Jevtović score only goal for Partizan, from penalty spot. In round of 32, Partizan was eliminated by Viktoria Plzeň, 1–3 on aggregate.

Partizan began their 2018–19 European campaign in the first qualifying round of the 2018–19 UEFA Europa League, eliminating Montenegrin Rudar Pljevlja 6–0 on aggregate. In the second and third qualifying round, Partizan eliminate Lithuanian Trakai (2–1 on aggregate) and Denmark Nordsjælland (5–3 on aggregate). In play-off round, Partizan were eliminated by Beşiktaş. After 1–1 in Belgrade, Partizan lost 0–3 in Istanbul and failed to reach the group stage.

In July and August 2019, Partizan secured their ninth participation in the group stage of UEFA Europa League. Under Savo Milošević's leadership, Partizan knocked-out Connah's Quay Nomads F.C. (1–0 victory (A) and 3–0 victory at home), Yeni Malatyaspor (3–1 victory in first match, in Belgrade and 0–1 defeat in Turkey) and Molde FK(2–1 at home and 1–1 in Norway) in the qualifiers. On 19 September, Partizan opened the group stage campaign with a 2–2 home draw against AZ. Due to UEFA sanctions, this game was played behind the closed doors with only U15s allowed to attend - official attendance at the game was 22,564. Partizan beat Astana (2–1 away) on matchday 2, but lost the two following games against Manchester United (0–1 in Belgrade and 3–0 in Manchester). They still managed to draw in Alkmaar against AZ (2–2) and beat Astana 4–1 at home on the last two games of the group. However, this wasn't enough to get through as they finished third in the group just one point behind AZ.

== Matches ==
Only official matches included (European Cup / Champions League, Cup Winners' Cup, UEFA Cup / Europa League, Conference League and Inter-Cities Fairs Cup matches).

Season	Competition	Round	Club	Home	Away	Aggregate
1955–56	European Cup	First round	(Portugal) Sporting CP	5–2	3–3	8–5
1955–56	European Cup	Quarter-finals	(Spain) Real Madrid	3–0	0–4	3–4
1961–62	European Cup	Preliminary round	(Portugal) Sporting CP	2–0	1–1	3–1
1961–62	European Cup	First round	(Italy) Juventus	1–2	0–5	1–7
1962–63	European Cup	Preliminary round	(Bulgaria) CSKA Red Flag	1–4	1–2	2–6
1963–64	European Cup	Preliminary round	(Cyprus) Anorthosis Famagusta	3–0	3–1	6–1
1963–64	European Cup	First round	(Luxembourg) Jeunesse Esch	6–2	1–2	7–4
1963–64	European Cup	Quarter-finals	(Italy) Internazionale	0–2	1–2	1–4
1965–66	European Cup	Preliminary round	(France) Nantes	2–0	2–2	4–2
1965–66	European Cup	First round	(West Germany) Werder Bremen	3–0	0–1	3–1
1965–66	European Cup	Quarter-finals	(Czechoslovakia) Sparta Prague	5–0	1–4	6–4
1965–66	European Cup	Semi-finals	(England) Manchester United	2–0	0–1	2–1
1965–66	European Cup	Final	(Spain) Real Madrid	1–2		
1967–68	Inter-Cities Fairs Cup	First round	(Bulgaria) Lokomotiv Plovdiv	5–1	1–1	6–2
1967–68	Inter-Cities Fairs Cup	Second round	(England) Leeds United	1–2	1–1	2–3
1969–70	Inter-Cities Fairs Cup	First round	(Hungary) Újpest Dózsa	2–1	0–2	2–3
1970–71	Inter-Cities Fairs Cup	First round	(East Germany) Dynamo Dresden	0–0	0–6	0–6
1974–75	UEFA Cup	First round	(Poland) Górnik Zabrze	3–0	2–2	5–2
1974–75	UEFA Cup	Second round	(Northern Ireland) Portadown	5–0	1–1	6–1
1974–75	UEFA Cup	Third round	(West Germany) 1. FC Köln	1–0	1–5	2–5
1976–77	European Cup	First round	(Soviet Union) Dynamo Kyiv	0–2	0–3	0–5
1978–79	European Cup	First round	(East Germany) Dynamo Dresden	2–0	0–2	2–2 (4–5 p)
1983–84	European Cup	First round	(Norway) Viking	5–1	0–0	5–1
1983–84	European Cup	Second round	(East Germany) Dynamo Berlin	1–0	0–2	1–2
1984–85	UEFA Cup	First round	(Malta) Rabat Ajax	2–0	2–0	4–0
1984–85	UEFA Cup	Second round	(England) Queens Park Rangers	4–0	2–6	6–6 (a)
1984–85	UEFA Cup	Third round	(Hungary) Videoton	2–0	0–5	2–5
1985–86	UEFA Cup	First round	(Portugal) Portimonense	4–0	0–1	4–1
1985–86	UEFA Cup	Second round	(France) Nantes	1–1	0–4	1–5
1986–87	UEFA Cup	First round	(West Germany) Borussia Mönchengladbach	1–3	0–1	1–4
1987–88	UEFA Cup	First round	(Albania) Flamurtari	2–1	0–2	2–3
1988–89	UEFA Cup	First round	(Bulgaria) Slavia Sofia	5–0	5–0	10–0
1988–89	UEFA Cup	Second round	(Italy) Roma	4–2	0–2	4–4 (a)
1989–90	European Cup Winners' Cup	First round	(Scotland) Celtic	2–1	4–5	6–6 (a)
1989–90	European Cup Winners' Cup	Second round	(Netherlands) Groningen	3–1	3–4	6–5
1989–90	European Cup Winners' Cup	Quarter-finals	(Romania) Dinamo București	0–2	1–2	1–4
1990–91	UEFA Cup	First round	(Malta) Hibernians	2–0	3–0	5–0
1990–91	UEFA Cup	Second round	(Spain) Real Sociedad	1–0	0–1	1–1 (4–3 p)
1990–91	UEFA Cup	Third round	(Italy) Internazionale	1–1	0–3	1–4
1991–92	UEFA Cup	First round	(Spain) Sporting Gijón	2–0	0–2	2–2 (2–3 p)
1996–97	UEFA Cup	Preliminary round	(Israel) Maccabi Haifa	3–1	1–0	4–1
1996–97	UEFA Cup	Qualifying round	(Romania) Național București	0–0	0–1	0–1
1997–98	Champions League	First qualifying round	Croatia Zagreb	1–0	0–5	1–5
1998–99	Cup Winners' Cup	Qualifying round	(Georgia (country)) Dinamo Batumi	2–0	0–1	2–1
1998–99	Cup Winners' Cup	First round	(England) Newcastle United	1–0	1–2	2–2 (a)
1998–99	Cup Winners' Cup	Second round	(Italy) Lazio	2–3	0–0	2–3
1999–2000	Champions League	First qualifying round	(Estonia) Flora	6–0	4–1	10–1
1999–2000	Champions League	Second qualifying round	(Croatia) Rijeka	3–1	3–0	6–1
1999–2000	Champions League	Third qualifying round	(Russia) Spartak Moscow	1–3	0–2	1–5
1999–2000	UEFA Cup	First round	(England) Leeds United	1–3	0–1	1–4
2000–01	UEFA Cup	Qualifying round	(Malta) Sliema Wanderers	4–1	1–2	5–3
2000–01	UEFA Cup	First round	(Portugal) Porto	1–1	0–1	1–2
2001–02	UEFA Cup	Qualifying round	(Andorra) Santa Coloma	7–1	1–0	8–1
2001–02	UEFA Cup	First round	(Austria) Rapid Wien	1–0	1–5	2–5
2002–03	Champions League	Second qualifying round	(Sweden) Hammarby IF	4–0	1–1	5–1
2002–03	Champions League	Third qualifying round	(Germany) Bayern Munich	0–3	1–3	1–6
2002–03	UEFA Cup	First round	(Portugal) Sporting CP	3–3	3–1	6–4
2002–03	UEFA Cup	Second round	(Czech Republic) Slavia Prague	3–1	1–5	4–6
2003–04	Champions League	QR2	(Sweden) Djurgårdens IF	1–1	2–2	3–3 (a)
2003–04	Champions League	QR3	(England) Newcastle United	0–1	1–0	1–1 (4–3 p)
2003–04	Champions League	Group F	(France) Marseille	1–1	0–3	4th
2003–04	Champions League	Group F	(Portugal) Porto	1–1	1–2	4th
2003–04	Champions League	Group F	(Spain) Real Madrid	0–0	0–1	4th
2004–05	UEFA Cup	Second qualifying round	(Romania) Oțelul Galați	1–0	0–0	1–0
2004–05	UEFA Cup	First round	(Romania) Dinamo București	3–1	0–0	3–1
2004–05	UEFA Cup	Group E	(Greece) Egaleo	4–0	—N/a	3rd
2004–05	UEFA Cup	Group E	(Italy) Lazio	—N/a	2–2	3rd
2004–05	UEFA Cup	Group E	(Spain) Villarreal	1–1	—N/a	3rd
2004–05	UEFA Cup	Group E	(England) Middlesbrough	—N/a	0–3	3rd
2004–05	UEFA Cup	Round of 32	(Ukraine) Dnipro Dnipropetrovsk	2–2	1–0	3–2
2004–05	UEFA Cup	Round of 16	(Russia) CSKA Moscow	1–1	0–2	1–3
2005–06	Champions League	Second qualifying round	(Moldova) Sheriff Tiraspol	1–0	1–0	2–0
2005–06	Champions League	Third qualifying round	(Slovakia) Artmedia Petržalka	0–0	0–0	0–0 (3–4 p)
2005–06	UEFA Cup	First round	(Israel) Maccabi Petah Tikva	2–5	2–0	4–5
2006–07	UEFA Cup	Second qualifying round	(Slovenia) Maribor	2–1	1–1	3–2
2006–07	UEFA Cup	First round	(Netherlands) Groningen	4–2	0–1	4–3
2006–07	UEFA Cup	Group A	(Italy) Livorno	1–1	—N/a	5th
2006–07	UEFA Cup	Group A	(Israel) Maccabi Haifa	—N/a	0–1	5th
2006–07	UEFA Cup	Group A	(France) Auxerre	1–4	—N/a	5th
2006–07	UEFA Cup	Group A	(Scotland) Rangers	—N/a	0–1	5th
2007–08	UEFA Cup	First qualifying round	(Bosnia and Herzegovina) Zrinjski Mostar	5–0	6–1	11–1 (disq.)
2008–09	Champions League	Second qualifying round	(Azerbaijan) Inter Baku	2–0	1–1	3–1
2008–09	Champions League	Third qualifying round	(Turkey) Fenerbahçe	2–2	1–2	3–4
2008–09	UEFA Cup	First round	(Romania) Politehnica Timișoara	1–0	2–1	3–1
2008–09	UEFA Cup	Group C	(Spain) Sevilla	—N/a	0–3	5th
2008–09	UEFA Cup	Group C	(Italy) Sampdoria	1–2	—N/a	5th
2008–09	UEFA Cup	Group C	(Germany) VfB Stuttgart	—N/a	0–2	5th
2008–09	UEFA Cup	Group C	(Belgium) Standard Liège	0–1	—N/a	5th
2009–10	Champions League	Second qualifying round	(Wales) Rhyl	8–0	4–0	12–0
2009–10	Champions League	Third qualifying round	(Cyprus) APOEL	1–0	0–2	1–2
2009–10	Europa League	Play-off round	(Slovakia) Žilina	1–1	2–0	3–1
2009–10	Europa League	Group J	(France) Toulouse	2–3	0–1	4th
2009–10	Europa League	Group J	(Belgium) Club Brugge	2–4	0–2	4th
2009–10	Europa League	Group J	(Ukraine) Shakhtar Donetsk	1–0	1–4	4th
2010–11	Champions League	Second qualifying round	(Armenia) Pyunik	3–1	1–0	4–1
2010–11	Champions League	Third qualifying round	(Finland) HJK	3–0	2–1	5–1
2010–11	Champions League	Play-off round	(Belgium) Anderlecht	2–2	2–2	4–4 (3–2 p)
2010–11	Champions League	Group H	(England) Arsenal	1–3	1–3	4th
2010–11	Champions League	Group H	(Ukraine) Shakhtar Donetsk	0–3	0–1	4th
2010–11	Champions League	Group H	(Portugal) Braga	0–1	0–2	4th
2011–12	Champions League	Second qualifying round	(North Macedonia) Shkëndija	4–0	1–0	5–0
2011–12	Champions League	Third qualifying round	(Belgium) Genk	1–1	1–2	2–3
2011–12	Europa League	Play-off round	(Republic of Ireland) Shamrock Rovers	1–2	1–1	2–3
2012–13	Champions League	Second qualifying round	(Malta) Valletta	3–1	4–1	7–2
2012–13	Champions League	Third qualifying round	(Cyprus) AEL Limassol	0–1	0–1	0–2
2012–13	Europa League	Play-off round	(Norway) Tromsø	1–0	2–3	3–3 (a)
2012–13	Europa League	Group H	(Italy) Internazionale	1–3	0–1	3rd
2012–13	Europa League	Group H	(Russia) Rubin Kazan	1–1	0–2	3rd
2012–13	Europa League	Group H	(Azerbaijan) Neftçi	0–0	1–1	3rd
2013–14	Champions League	Second qualifying round	(Armenia) Shirak	0–0	1–1	1–1 (a)
2013–14	Champions League	Third qualifying round	(Bulgaria) Ludogorets Razgrad	0–1	1–2	1–3
2013–14	Europa League	Play-off round	(Switzerland) Thun	1–0	0–3	1–3
2014–15	Champions League	Second qualifying round	(Faroe Islands) HB Tórshavn	3–0	3–1	6–1
2014–15	Champions League	Third qualifying round	(Bulgaria) Ludogorets Razgrad	2–2	0–0	2–2 (a)
2014–15	Europa League	Play-off round	(Azerbaijan) Neftçi	3–2	2–1	5–3
2014–15	Europa League	Group C	(England) Tottenham Hotspur	0–0	0–1	4th
2014–15	Europa League	Group C	(Turkey) Beşiktaş	0–4	1–2	4th
2014–15	Europa League	Group C	(Greece) Asteras Tripolis	0–0	0–2	4th
2015–16	Champions League	Second qualifying round	(Georgia (country)) Dila Gori	1–0	2–0	3–0
2015–16	Champions League	Third qualifying round	(Romania) Steaua București	4–2	1–1	5–3
2015–16	Champions League	Play-off round	(Belarus) BATE Borisov	2–1	0–1	2–2 (a)
2015–16	Europa League	Group L	(Netherlands) AZ	3–2	2–1	3rd
2015–16	Europa League	Group L	(Germany) FC Augsburg	1–3	3–1	3rd
2015–16	Europa League	Group L	(Spain) Athletic Bilbao	0–2	1–5	3rd
2016–17	Europa League	Second qualifying round	(Poland) Zagłębie Lubin	0–0	0–0	0–0 (3–4 p)
2017–18	Champions League	Second qualifying round	(Montenegro) Budućnost Podgorica	2–0	0–0	2–0
2017–18	Champions League	Third qualifying round	(Greece) Olympiacos	1–3	2–2	3–5
2017–18	Europa League	Play-off round	(Hungary) Videoton	0–0	4–0	4–0
2017–18	Europa League	Group C	(Ukraine) Dynamo Kyiv	2–3	1–4	2nd
2017–18	Europa League	Group C	(Switzerland) Young Boys	2–1	1–1	2nd
2017–18	Europa League	Group C	(Albania) Skënderbeu	2–0	0–0	2nd
2017–18	Europa League	Round of 32	(Czech Republic) Viktoria Plzeň	1–1	0–2	1–3
2018–19	Europa League	First qualifying round	(Montenegro) Rudar Pljevlja	3–0	3–0	6–0
2018–19	Europa League	Second qualifying round	(Lithuania) Trakai	1–0	1–1	2–1
2018–19	Europa League	Third qualifying round	(Denmark) Nordsjælland	3–2	2–1	5–3
2018–19	Europa League	Play-off round	(Turkey) Beşiktaş	1–1	0–3	1–4
2019–20	Europa League	Second qualifying round	(Wales) Connah's Quay Nomads	3–0	1–0	4–0
2019–20	Europa League	Third qualifying round	(Turkey) Yeni Malatyaspor	3–1	0–1	3–2
2019–20	Europa League	Play-off round	(Norway) Molde	2–1	1–1	3–2
2019–20	Europa League	Group L	(Netherlands) AZ	2–2	2–2	3rd
2019–20	Europa League	Group L	(Kazakhstan) Astana	4–1	2–1	3rd
2019–20	Europa League	Group L	(England) Manchester United	0–1	0–3	3rd
2020–21	Europa League	First qualifying round	(Latvia) RFS	1–0	—N/a	—N/a
2020–21	Europa League	Second qualifying round	(Moldova) Sfântul Gheorghe	—N/a	1–0	—N/a
2020–21	Europa League	Third qualifying round	(Belgium) Charleroi	—N/a	1–2	—N/a
2021–22	Europa Conference League	Second qualifying round	(Slovakia) DAC Dunajská Streda	1–0	2–0	3–0
2021–22	Europa Conference League	Third qualifying round	(Russia) Sochi	2–2	1–1	3–3 (4–2 p)
2021–22	Europa Conference League	Play-off round	(Portugal) Santa Clara	2–0	1–2	3–2
2021–22	Europa Conference League	Group B	(Belgium) Gent	0–1	1–1	2nd
2021–22	Europa Conference League	Group B	(Estonia) Flora	2–0	0–1	2nd
2021–22	Europa Conference League	Group B	(Cyprus) Anorthosis Famagusta	1–1	2–0	2nd
2021–22	Europa Conference League	Knockout round play-offs	(Czech Republic) Sparta Prague	2–1	1–0	3–1
2021–22	Europa Conference League	Round of 16	(Netherlands) Feyenoord	2–5	1–3	3–8
2022–23	Europa League	Third qualifying round	(Cyprus) AEK Larnaca	2–2	1–2	3–4
2022–23	Europa Conference League	Play-off round	(Malta) Ħamrun Spartans	4–1	3–3	7–4
2022–23	Europa Conference League	Group D	(Germany) 1. FC Köln	2–0	1–0	2nd
2022–23	Europa Conference League	Group D	(France) Nice	1–1	1–2	2nd
2022–23	Europa Conference League	Group D	(Czech Republic) Slovácko	1–1	3–3	2nd
2022–23	Europa Conference League	Knockout round play-offs	(Moldova) Sheriff Tiraspol	1–3	1–0	2–3
2023–24	Europa Conference League	Third qualifying round	(Azerbaijan) Sabah	2–0	0–2	2–2 (5–4 p)
2023–24	Europa Conference League	Play-off round	(Denmark) Nordsjælland	0–1	0–5	0–6
2024–25	Champions League	Second qualifying round	(Ukraine) Dynamo Kyiv	0−3	2−6	2−9
2024–25	Europa League	Third qualifying round	(Switzerland) Lugano	0−1	2–2	2−3
2024–25	Conference League	Play-off round	(Belgium) Gent	0−1	0−1	0−2
2025–26	Europa League	First qualifying round	(Cyprus) AEK Larnaca	2–1	0−1	2–2 (5–6 p)
2025–26	Conference League	Second qualifying round	(Ukraine) Oleksandriya	4–0	2–0	6–0
2025–26	Conference League	Third qualifying round	(Scotland) Hibernian	0−2	3–2	3–4
2026–27	Conference League	Second qualifying round	(Luxembourg) UNA Strassen	4–0	1–0	5–0
2026–27	Conference League	Third qualifying round	(Kazakhstan) Tobol	3–0	2–1	5–1
2026–27	Conference League	Play-off round	(Spain) Getafe	2–1	1−3	3–4

== Scorers ==
=== SFR Yugoslavia era (1955–1992) ===
Season	Competition	Round	Opponent	Attend.	Home	Scorers for Partizan	Attend.	Away	Scorers for Partizan	Agg.
1955–56	European Cup	R1	(Portugal) Sporting CP	15,000	5–2	M. Milutinović 15', 29', 64', 74', Jocić 88'	30,000	3–3	M. Milutinović 45', 50', Bobek 73'	8–5
1955–56	European Cup	QF	(Spain) Real Madrid	40,000	3–0	M. Milutinović 24', 87', Mihajlović 46' (pen.)	105,532	0–4	—	3–4
1961–62	European Cup	QR	(Portugal) Sporting CP	19,755	2–0	Radović 18', Vislavski 87'	16,302	1–1	Vukelić 68'	3–1
1961–62	European Cup	R1	(Italy) Juventus	23,472	1–2	Vasović 76'	14,347	0–5	—	1–7
1962–63	European Cup	QR	(Bulgaria) CSKA Red Flag	26,890	1–4	Galić 70'	21,421	1–2	Kovačević 35' (pen.)	2–6
1963–64	European Cup	QR	(Cyprus) Anorthosis Famagusta	11,033	3–0	Kovačević 50' (pen.), 65', Galić 88'	6,245	3–1	Galić 25', Bajić 53', Kovačević 85'	6–1
1963–64	European Cup	R1	(Luxembourg) Jeunesse Esch	8,226	6–2	Kovačević 18', 39', 66', 77', Čebinac 45', Galić 57'	2,921	1–2	Galić 33'	7–4
1963–64	European Cup	QF	(Italy) Internazionale	19,509	0–2	—	32,100	1–2	Bajić 68'	1–4
1965–66	European Cup	QR	(France) Nantes	20,464	2–0	Galić 37', Hasanagić 48'	16,007	2–2	Kovačević 43', Galić 47'	4–2
1965–66	European Cup	R1	(West Germany) Werder Bremen	24,203	3–0	Jusufi 70', Hasanagić 75', Pirmajer 89'	28,478	0–1	—	3–1
1965–66	European Cup	QF	(Czechoslovakia) Sparta Prague	36,912	5–0	Kovačević 4', 29', Vasović 23', Hasanagić 35', 41'	30,214	1–4	Hasanagić 16'	6–4
1965–66	European Cup	SF	(England) Manchester United	37,031	2–0	Hasanagić 46', Bečejac 59'	61,475	0–1	—	2–1
1965–66	European Cup	Final	(Spain) Real Madrid	46,745	1–2				Vasović 55'	
1967–68	Inter-Cities Fairs Cup	R1	(Bulgaria) Lokomotiv Plovdiv	5,200	5–1	Hasanagić 44', 57', 88', Kovačević 46', Rašović 70'	4,000	1–1	Petrović 31'	6–2
1967–68	Inter-Cities Fairs Cup	R2	(England) Leeds United	10,000	1–2	Paunović 87'	34,258	1–1	Petrović 61'	2–3
1969–70	Inter-Cities Fairs Cup	R1	(Hungary) Újpest Dózsa	25,000	2–1	Đorđević 50', 54'	25,000	0–2	—	2–3
1970–71	Inter-Cities Fairs Cup	R1	(East Germany) Dynamo Dresden	9,600	0–0	—	30,500	0–6	—	0–6
1974–75	UEFA Cup	R1	(Poland) Górnik Zabrze	4,000	3–0	Vukotić 21', Borčević 79', Todorović 89'	18,744	2–2	Zavišić 72', Vukotić 86'	5–2
1974–75	UEFA Cup	R2	(Northern Ireland) Portadown	15,000	5–0	Kozić 24', 63', Zavišić 35', Nikolić 79', Vukotić 89'	1,908	1–1	Todorović 62'	6–1
1974–75	UEFA Cup	R3	(West Germany) 1. FC Köln	16,000	1–0	Vukotić 81'	18,000	1–5	Kozić 73'	2–5
1976–77	European Cup	R1	(Soviet Union) Dynamo Kyiv	70,000	0–2	—	41,000	0–3	—	0–5
1978–79	European Cup	R1	(East Germany) Dynamo Dresden	50,000	2–0	Prekazi 5', Đurović 47'	29,000	0–2	—	2–2 (4–5 p)
1983–84	European Cup	R1	(Norway) Viking	30,000	5–1	Dimitrijević 27', 38' (pen.), Prekazi 44', Živković 82', 87'	2,000	0–0	—	5–1
1983–84	European Cup	R2	(East Germany) Dynamo Berlin	55,000	1–0	Prekazi 27'	19,500	0–2	—	1–2
1984–85	UEFA Cup	R1	(Malta) Rabat Ajax	12,000	2–0	Mance 18', Stevanović 64'	6,000	2–0	Vučićević 63', Đelmaš 70'	4–0
1984–85	UEFA Cup	R2	(England) Queens Park Rangers	60,000	4–0	Mance 4', Kaličanin 40' (pen.), Ješić 46' Živković 64'	7,836	2–6	Klinčarski 14', Mance 25'	6–6 (a)
1984–85	UEFA Cup	R3	(Hungary) Videoton	30,000	2–0	Živković 12', Varga 45'	20,000	0–5	—	2–5
1985–86	UEFA Cup	R1	(Portugal) Portimonense	33,000	4–0	Vučićević 18' (pen.), 81', 85', M. Đukić 27'	13,000	0–1	—	4–1
1985–86	UEFA Cup	R2	(France) Nantes	55,000	1–1	Le Roux 28' (o.g.)	30,000	0–4	—	1–5
1986–87	UEFA Cup	R1	(Germany) Borussia Mönchengladbach	50,000	1–3	Vučićević 47'	6,000	0–1	—	1–4
1987–88	UEFA Cup	R1	(Albania) Flamurtari	40,000	2–1	Stevanović 43' (pen.), Vokrri 60'	19,000	0–2	—	2–3
1988–89	UEFA Cup	R1	(Bulgaria) Slavia Sofia	25,000	5–0	Batrović 7', 29', V. Đukić 46', Vokrri 48', M. Đukić 90'	6,500	5–0	Vokrri 47', Đorđević 51', Grekov 73' (o.g.), M. Đukić 79', V. Đukić 89'	10–0
1988–89	UEFA Cup	R2	(Italy) Roma	44,790	4–2	V. Đukić 17', 77', Vermezović 31', Milojević 54'	20,755	0–2	—	4–4 (a)
1989–90	European Cup Winners' Cup	R1	(Scotland) Celtic	15,000 (Note: The Partizan v Celtic match was played in Mostar.)	2–1	Milojević 21', Đurđević 55'	45,298	4–5	Vujačić 8', Đorđević 50', Ǵurovski 61', Šćepović 86'	6–6 (a)
1989–90	European Cup Winners' Cup	R2	(Netherlands) Groningen	50,000	3–1	Ǵurovski 16', Milojević 83' – Đurđević 90'	20,000	3–4	Bajović 32', Ǵurovski 45', 83'	6–5
1989–90	European Cup Winners' Cup	QF	(Romania) Dinamo București	15,000 (Note: The Partizan v Dinamo București match was played in Podgorica.)	0–2	—	12,000	1–2	Spasić 70'	1–4
1990–91	UEFA Cup	R1	(Malta) Hibernians	10,000	2–0	Stevanović 25', Šćepović 80'	2,000	3–0	Đurđević 16', Đorđević 81', Mijatović 89'	5–0
1990–91	UEFA Cup	R2	(Spain) Real Sociedad	45,000	1–0	Stevanović 48'	21,600	0–1	—	1–1 (5–4 p)
1990–91	UEFA Cup	R3	(Italy) Internazionale	33,500	1–1	Stevanović 64'	63,071	0–3	—	1–4
1991–92	UEFA Cup	R1	(Spain) Sporting de Gijón	1,189 (Note: The Partizan v Sporting de Gijón match was played in Istanbul.)	2–0	Mijatović 86', Krčmarević 89'	23,600	0–2	—	2–2 (2–3 p)

=== FR Yugoslavia / Serbia and Montenegro era (1992–2006) ===
Season	Competition	Round	Opponent	Attend.	Home	Scorers for Partizan	Attend.	Away	Scorers for Partizan	Agg.
1996–97	UEFA Cup	QR1	(Israel) Maccabi Haifa		3–1	Trenevski 33' (pen.), Saveljić 52', Hristov 83'		1–0	Svetličić 10'	4–1
1996–97	UEFA Cup	QR2	(Romania) Național București	15,000	0–0	—	7,000	0–1	—	0–1
1997–98	Champions League	QR1	Croatia Zagreb	35,000	1–0	Isailović 84'	40,000	0–5	—	1–5
1998–99	Cup Winners' Cup	QR	(Georgia (country)) Dinamo Batumi	8,500	2–0	Bjeković 18, Ilić 34'		0–1	—	2–1
1998–99	Cup Winners' Cup	R1	(England) Newcastle United	26,200	1–0	Rašović 53' (pen.)	26,599	1–2	Rašović 68' (pen.)	2–2 (a)
1998–99	Cup Winners' Cup	R2	(Italy) Lazio	32,000	2–3	Krstajić 18, Iliev 85'	24,966	0–0	—	2–3
1999–2000	Champions League	QR1	(Estonia) Flora Tallinn	10,000	6–0	Ilić 12', Peković 25', 71', Ivić 36', 75', Kežman 56'	400	4–1	Kežman 10', 69', Ilić 20', Tomić 82'	10–1
1999–2000	Champions League	QR2	(Croatia) Rijeka	21,746	3–1	Ilić 10', Krstajić 22', 86'	10,500	3–0	Kežman 7', 82', Ivić 18'	6–1
1999–2000	Champions League	QR3	(Russia) Spartak Moscow	18,216	1–3	Kežman 73'	42,000	0–2	—	1–5
1999–2000	UEFA Cup	R1	(England) Leeds United	4,950 (Note: The Partizan v Leeds United match was played in Heerenveen.)	1–3	Tomić 21'	39,806	0–1	—	1–4
2000–01	UEFA Cup	QR	(Malta) Sliema Wanderers	10,000	4–1	Ilić 4', 32', 45', Ranković 60'		1–2	Ilić 35'	5–3
2000–01	UEFA Cup	R1	(Portugal) Porto	25,000	1–1	Ranković 24'	15,610	0–1	—	1–2
2001–02	UEFA Cup	QR	(Andorra) Santa Coloma	10,000	7–1	Ivić 11', 59', Delibašić 21', Čakar 67', 87' (pen.), Vukić 78', Iliev 90'	900	1–0	Čakar 6'	8–1
2001–02	UEFA Cup	R1	(Austria) Rapid Wien	17,000	1–0	Bajić 90'	15,400	1–5	Wagner 57' (o.g.)	2–5
2002–03	Champions League	QR2	(Sweden) Hammarby IF	13,507	4–0	Ivić 49', Lazović 54', Iliev 64', Ilić 75',	19,500	1–1	Lazović 36'	5–1
2002–03	Champions League	QR3	(Germany) Bayern Munich	30,000	0–3	—	25,000	1–3	Čakar 72'	1–6
2002–03	UEFA Cup	R1	(Portugal) Sporting CP	Cl. doors	3–3	Delibašić 78', Živković 110', Čakar 117',	15,000	3–1	Hugo 12' (o.g.), Delibašić 37', Iliev 79',	6–4
2002–03	UEFA Cup	R2	(Czech Republic) Slavia Prague	18,000	3–1	Lazović 4', Ilić 32', Vukić 69'	7,000	1–5	Ivić 89'	4–6
2003–04	Champions League	QR2	(Sweden) Djurgårdens IF	26,000	1–1	Ilić 59'	28,287	2–2	Ilić 61', Malbaša 66' (pen.)	3–3 (a)
2003–04	Champions League	QR3	(England) Newcastle United	30,000	0–1	—	39,293	1–0	Iliev 50'	1–1 (4–3 p)
2003–04	Champions League	Group F	(France) Marseille	30,000	1–1	Delibašić 80'	55,000	0–3	—	4th out of 4
2003–04	Champions League	Group F	(Portugal) Porto	30,000	1–1	Delibašić 54'	23,000	1–2	Delibašić 90+2'	4th out of 4
2003–04	Champions League	Group F	(Spain) Real Madrid	30,000	0–0	—	58,000	0–1	—	4th out of 4
2004–05	UEFA Cup	QR2	(Romania) Oțelul Galați	6,000	1–0	Radonjić 29'	1,000	0–0	—	1–0
2004–05	UEFA Cup	R1	(Romania) Dinamo București	14,000	3–1	Tomić 53', Boya 54', Brnović 85'	18,000	0–0	—	3–1
2004–05	UEFA Cup	Group E	(Greece) Egaleo	15,000	4–0	Christou 22' (o.g.), Ilić 55', 60', Vukčević 68'	N/A	N/A	N/A	3rd out of 5
2004–05	UEFA Cup	Group E	(Italy) Lazio	N/A	N/A	N/A	17,000	2–2	Boya 6', 24'	3rd out of 5
2004–05	UEFA Cup	Group E	(Spain) Villarreal	25,000	1–1	Tomić 65' (pen.)	N/A	N/A	N/A	3rd out of 5
2004–05	UEFA Cup	Group E	(England) Middlesbrough	N/A	N/A	N/A	20,856	0–3	—	3rd out of 5
2004–05	UEFA Cup	R32	(Ukraine) Dnipro Dnipropetrovsk	15,000	2–2	Odita 12', 45'	14,000	1–0	Radović 88'	3–2
2004–05	UEFA Cup	R16	(Russia) CSKA Moscow	20,000	1–1	Tomić 83' (pen.)	23,000	0–2	—	1–3
2005–06	Champions League	QR2	(Moldova) Sheriff Tiraspol	17,000	1–0	Odita 63'	13,000	1–0	Odita 74'	2–0
2005–06	Champions League	QR3	(Slovakia) Artmedia Petržalka	30,000	0–0	—	16,127	0–0	—	0–0 (3–4 p)
2005–06	UEFA Cup	R1	(Israel) Maccabi Petah Tikva	12,000	2–5	Radonjić 13' (pen.), 41'	3,700	2–0	Vukčević 33', Radonjić 46'	4–5

=== Serbia era (2006–present) ===
Season	Competition	Round	Opponent	Attend.	Home	Scorers for Partizan	Attend.	Away	Scorers for Partizan	Agg.
2006–07	UEFA Cup	QR2	(Slovenia) Maribor	8,000	2–1	Odita 28', 30'	8,500	1–1	Zajić 30'	3–2
2006–07	UEFA Cup	R1	(Netherlands) Groningen	10,658	4–2	Marinković 4' (pen.), 43', Zajić 16', 90'	19,097	0–1	—	4–3
2006–07	UEFA Cup	Group A	(Italy) Livorno	12,170	1–1	Mirosavljević 70'	N/A	N/A	N/A	5th out of 5
2006–07	UEFA Cup	Group A	(Israel) Maccabi Haifa	N/A	N/A	N/A	17,000	0–1	—	5th out of 5
2006–07	UEFA Cup	Group A	(France) Auxerre	4,000	1–4	Marinković 5'	N/A	N/A	N/A	5th out of 5
2006–07	UEFA Cup	Group A	(Scotland) Rangers	N/A	N/A	N/A	45,129	0–1	—	5th out of 5
2007–08	UEFA Cup	QR1	(Bosnia and Herzegovina) Zrinjski Mostar	15,000	5–0	Maletić 4', Moreira 32', Jovetić 37', 51', 71'	9,000	6–1	Diarra 32', 60', 63', Maletić 40', Jovetić 48', Lazetić 80'	11–1 (disq.)
2008–09	Champions League	QR2	(Azerbaijan) Inter Baku	19,221	2–0	Juca 61', Diarra 83'	8,500	1–1	Bogunović 4'	3–1
2008–09	Champions League	QR3	(Turkey) Fenerbahçe	22,274	2–2	Paunović 10', Bogunović 14'	36,675	1–2	Tošić 76'	3–4
2008–09	UEFA Cup	R1	(Romania) Politehnica Timișoara	15,623	1–0	Stevanović 70'	20,000	2–1	Tošić 35', Bogunović 69'	3–1
2008–09	UEFA Cup	Group C	(Spain) Sevilla	N/A	N/A	N/A	20,500	0–3	—	5th out of 5
2008–09	UEFA Cup	Group C	(Italy) Sampdoria	23,780	1–2	Diarra 34'	N/A	N/A	N/A	5th out of 5
2008–09	UEFA Cup	Group C	(Germany) VfB Stuttgart	N/A	N/A	N/A	20,500	0–2	—	5th out of 5
2008–09	UEFA Cup	Group C	(Belgium) Standard Liège	14,210	0–1	—	N/A	N/A	N/A	5th out of 5
2009–10	Champions League	QR2	(Wales) Rhyl	9,321	8–0	Diarra 4', Cléo 17', 51', 72' (pen.), Đorđević 20', Ilić 38', 63', Petrović 66'	1,726	4–0	Krstajić 17', Cléo 18', Diarra 45+1', Đorđević 69'	12–0
2009–10	Champions League	QR3	(Cyprus) APOEL	23,867	1–0	Moreira 3'	15,882	0–2	—	1–2
2009–10	Europa League	PO	(Slovakia) Žilina	14,143	1–1	Cléo 16' (pen.)	10,650	2–0	Diarra 59', Ilić 65'	3–1
2009–10	Europa League	Group J	(France) Toulouse	13,845	2–3	Krstajić 23', Cléo 67'	11,123	0–1	—	4th out of 4
2009–10	Europa League	Group J	(Belgium) Club Brugge	6,290	2–4	Ljajić 52', Washington 66'	18,903	0–2	—	4th out of 4
2009–10	Europa League	Group J	(Ukraine) Shakhtar Donetsk	6,000	1–0	Diarra 6'	49,480	1–4	Ljajić 86'	4th out of 4
2010–11	Champions League	QR2	(Armenia) Pyunik	11,134	3–1	Tomić 29', Moreira 45', Cléo 59'	4,500	1–0	Cléo 45+4'	4–1
2010–11	Champions League	QR3	(Finland) HJK Helsinki	14,300	3–0	Iliev 8', S. Ilić 42', Cléo 90+2'	4,230	2–1	Cléo 9', 90+2'	5–1
2010–11	Champions League	PO	(Belgium) Anderlecht	28,565	2–2	Cléo 57', Lecjaks 64' (o.g.)	19,551	2–2	Cléo 15', 53'	4–4 (3–2 p)
2010–11	Champions League	Group H	(England) Arsenal	29,348	1–3	Cléo 33' (pen.)	58,845	1–3	Cléo 52'	4th out of 4
2010–11	Champions League	Group H	(Ukraine) Shakhtar Donetsk	17,473	0–3	—	48,512	0–1	—	4th out of 4
2010–11	Champions League	Group H	(Portugal) Braga	28,295	0–1	—	11,454	0–2	—	4th out of 4
2011–12	Champions League	QR2	(North Macedonia) Shkëndija	15,324	4–0	Vukić 48', Eduardo 58', Šćepović 74', Berisha 76' (o.g.)	5,000	1–0	Jovančić 68'	5–0
2011–12	Champions League	QR3	(Belgium) Genk	24,511	1–1	Tomić 40'	12,735	1–2	Tomić 65'	2–3
2011–12	Europa League	PO	(Republic of Ireland) Shamrock Rovers	13,706	1–2	Volkov 35'	4,650	1–1	Tomić 14'	2–3
2012–13	Champions League	QR2	(Malta) Valletta	8,754	3–1	Tomić 10', 67', Mitrović 73'	1,436	4–1	Tomić 6', Ivanov 33', S. Šćepović 42', Ostojić 71'	7–2
2012–13	Champions League	QR3	(Cyprus) AEL Limassol	17,257	0–1	—	6,940	0–1	—	0–2
2012–13	Europa League	PO	(Norway) Tromsø	14,725	1–0	Ivanov 75'	3,386	2–3	S. Marković 43', Mitrović 84'	3–3 (a)
2012–13	Europa League	Group H	(Italy) Internazionale	17,186	1–3	Tomić 90+1'	18,626	0–1	—	3rd out of 4
2012–13	Europa League	Group H	(Russia) Rubin Kazan	5,233	1–1	S. Marković 53'	10,433	0–2	—	3rd out of 4
2012–13	Europa League	Group H	(Azerbaijan) Neftçi	18,000	0–0	—	8,992	1–1	Mitrović 67'	3rd out of 4
2013–14	Champions League	QR2	(Armenia) Shirak	15,742	0–0	—	2,860	1–1	Volkov 90+2'	1–1 (a)
2013–14	Champions League	QR3	(Bulgaria) Ludogorets Razgrad	22,312	0–1	—	7,000	1–2	S. Marković 49'	1–3
2013–14	Europa League	PO	(Switzerland) Thun	15,000	1–0	Jojić 70'	8,150	0–3	—	1–3
2014–15	Champions League	QR2	(Faroe Islands) HB Tórshavn	11,758	3–0	Lazović 14', 64', Škuletić 71'	1,151	3–1	Ninković 49', Lazović 75', Grbić 90+1'	6–1
2014–15	Champions League	QR3	(Bulgaria) Ludogorets Razgrad	18,504	2–2	Škuletić 30', 35'	5,530	0–0	—	2–2 (a)
2014–15	Europa League	PO	(Azerbaijan) Neftçi	10,177	3–2	Denis 29' (o.g.), Grbić 32', Yunuszade 69' (o.g.)	22,350	2–1	Škuletić 24', 90+2'	5–3
2014–15	Europa League	Group C	(England) Tottenham Hotspur	22,112	0–0	—	28,362	0–1	—	4th out of 4
2014–15	Europa League	Group C	(Turkey) Beşiktaş	7,855	0–4	—	11,938	1–2	S. Marković 78'	4th out of 4
2014–15	Europa League	Group C	(Greece) Asteras Tripolis	6,750	0–0	—	3,601	0–2	—	4th out of 4
2015–16	Champions League	QR2	(Georgia (country)) Dila Gori	11,746	1–0	Babović 83'	3,842	2–0	Brašanac 37', Oumarou 64'	3–0
2015–16	Champions League	QR3	(Romania) Steaua București	26,775	4–2	Babović 8', Jevtović 60', Živković 69', Trujić 90+1'	Cl. doors	1–1	Vulićević 62'	5–3
2015–16	Champions League	PO	(Belarus) BATE Borisov	27,234	2–1	Zhavnerchik 74' (o.g.), Šaponjić 90+3'	11,628	0–1	—	2–2 (a)
2015–16	Europa League	Group L	(Netherlands) AZ	7,949	3–2	Oumarou 11', 40', Živković 89'	12,784	2–1	Oumarou 65', Živković 89'	3rd out of 4
2015–16	Europa League	Group L	(Germany) Augsburg	14,132	1–3	Oumarou 11'	22,948	3–1	Živković 31', 62', Fabrício 54'	3rd out of 4
2015–16	Europa League	Group L	(Spain) Athletic Bilbao	11,128	0–2	—	39,849	1–5	Oumarou 17'	3rd out of 4
2016–17	Europa League	QR2	(Poland) Zagłębie Lubin	15,870	0–0	—	11,279	0–0	—	0–0 (3–4 p)
2017–18	Champions League	QR2	(Montenegro) Budućnost Podgorica	20,530	2–0	Đurđević 53' (pen.), Leonardo 63'	9,153	0–0	—	2–0
2017–18	Champions League	QR3	(Greece) Olympiacos	24,658	1–3	Tawamba 10'	23,854	2–2	Soumah 33', Đurđević 85'	3–5
2017–18	Europa League	PO	(Hungary) Videoton	Cl. doors	0–0	—	3,485	4–0	Tawamba 6', Soumah 24', Đurđević 35', 87'	4–0
2017–18	Europa League	Group B	(Ukraine) Dynamo Kyiv	Cl. doors	2–3	Ožegović 34', Tawamba 42'	14,678	1–4	Jevtović 45+4' (pen.)	2nd out of 4
2017–18	Europa League	Group B	(Switzerland) Young Boys	20,568	2–1	Tawamba 12', Ožegović 53'	13,004	1–1	Janković 11'	2nd out of 4
2017–18	Europa League	Group B	(Albania) Skënderbeu	12,659	2–0	Tošić 39', Tawamba 66'	6,300	0–0	—	2nd out of 4
2017–18	Europa League	R32	(Czech Republic) Viktoria Plzeň	17,165	1–1	Tawamba 58'	10,185	0–2	—	1–3
2018–19	Europa League	QR1	(Montenegro) Rudar Pljevlja	5,869	3–0	Pantić 11', Ožegović 44', Gomes 83'	3,150	3–0	Jevtović 44' (pen.), Soumah 50', Gomes 57'	6–0
2018–19	Europa League	QR2	(Lithuania) Trakai	6,210	1–0	Januševskij 57' (o.g.)	1,980	1–1	Miletić 45+3'	2–1
2018–19	Europa League	QR3	(Denmark) Nordsjælland	9,372	3–2	Miletić 11', Janković 30', Marković 35'	6,079	2–1	Gomes 10', Zakarić 64'	5–3
2018–19	Europa League	PO	(Turkey) Beşiktaş	16,240	1–1	Gomes 14'	33,658	0–3	—	1–4
2019–20	Europa League	QR2	(Wales) Connah's Quay Nomads	8,200	3–0	Tošić 54', Ožegović 70', Stevanović 72'	829	1–0	Šćekić 62'	4–0
2019–20	Europa League	QR3	(Turkey) Yeni Malatyaspor	13,442	3–1	Sadiq 4', Asano 67', Soumah 90' (pen.)	14,665	0–1	—	3–2
2019–20	Europa League	PO	(Norway) Molde	3,157*	2–1	Soumah 45', Tošić 84'	7,102	1–1	Miletić 80'	3–2
2019–20	Europa League	Group L	(Netherlands) AZ	22,564*	2–2	Natcho 42' (pen.) 61'	9,092	2–2	Asano 16', Soumah 27'	3rd out of 4
2019–20	Europa League	Group L	(Kazakhstan) Astana	8,075	4–1	Soumah 4', Sadiq 22' 76', Asano 26'	20,137	2–1	Sadiq 29', 73'	3rd out of 4
2019–20	Europa League	Group L	(England) Manchester United	25,627	0–1	—	62,955	0–3	—	3rd out of 4
2020–21	Europa League	QR1	(Latvia) RFS	0	1–0	Natcho 53' (pen.)	N/A	N/A	N/A	N/A
2020–21	Europa League	QR2	(Moldova) Sfântul Gheorghe	N/A	N/A	N/A	0	1–0	Natcho 104' (pen.)	N/A
2020–21	Europa League	QR3	(Belgium) Charleroi	N/A	N/A	N/A	0	1–2	Soumah 53'	N/A
2021–22	Europa Conference League	QR2	(Slovakia) Dunajská Streda	10,131	1–0	Marković 19'	4,085	2–0	Pantić 20', Gomes 80'	3–0
2021–22	Europa Conference League	QR3	(Russia) Sochi	13,131	2–2	Jojić 55', Šćekić 90'	308	1–1	Gomes 73'	3–3 (4–2 p)
2021–22	Europa Conference League	PO	(Portugal) Santa Clara	14,525	2–0	Gomes 25' (pen.), Saničanin 27'	924	1–2	Vujačić 54'	3–2
2021–22	Europa Conference League	Group B	(Belgium) Gent	8,943	0–1	—	10,595	1–1	Urošević 66'	2nd out of 4
2021–22	Europa Conference League	Group B	(Estonia) Flora	5,845	2–0	Marković 20', 42'	1,503	0–1	—	2nd out of 4
2021–22	Europa Conference League	Group B	(Cyprus) Anorthosis Famagusta	4,493	1–1	Milovanović 20'	5,000	2–0	Menig 42', Gomes 68'	2nd out of 4
2021–22	Europa Conference League	KRPO	(Czech Republic) Sparta Prague	15,864	2–1	Gomes 7', 24'	1,000*	1–0	Menig 78'	3–1
2021–22	Europa Conference League	R16	(Netherlands) Feyenoord	13,564	2–5	Natcho 13', Jović 46'	40,850	1–3	Gomes 61'	3–8
2022–23	Europa League	QR3	(Cyprus) AEK Larnaca	10,802	2–2	Gomes 24', 54'	4,250	1–2	Menig 18'	3–4
2022–23	Europa Conference League									
2022–23	Europa Conference League	PO	(Malta) Hamrun Spartans	5,502	4–1	Diabaté 15', Urošević 25', Gomes 33', Andrade 77'	3,269	3–3	Gomes 34', 78', Urošević 72'	7–4
2022–23	Europa Conference League	Group D	(Czech Republic) Slovácko	17,256	1–1	Natcho 41'(pen)	7,032	3–3	Diabaté 47',53', Gomes 62'	2nd out of 4
2022–23	Europa Conference League	Group D	(France) Nice	9,126	1–1	Diabaté 60'	11,324	1–2	Gomes 74'	2nd out of 4
2022–23	Europa Conference League	Group D	(Germany) 1. FC Köln	15,467	2–0	Diabaté 15', Gomes 52'	47,000	1–0	Svetozar Marković 86'	2nd out of 4
2022–23	Europa Conference League	KRPO	(Moldova) Sheriff Tiraspol	8,575	1–3	Menig 13'	0	1–0	Gomes 45'	
2023–24	Europa Conference League	QR3	(Azerbaijan) Sabah	14,225	2–0	Saldanha 30', Natcho 58'	6,000	0–2	—	2–2 (5–4 p)
2023–24	Europa Conference League	PO	(Denmark) Nordsjælland	2,916	0–1	—	4,120	0–5	—	0–6
2024–25	Champions League	QR2	(Ukraine) Dynamo Kyiv	10	0–3	—	4,712	2–6	Saldanha 22' (pen.), 66'	2–9
2024–25	Europa League	QR3	(Switzerland) Lugano	3,163	0–1	—	2,268	2–2	Zahid 44', Marković 67'	2–3
2024–25	Conference League	PO	(Belgium) Gent	0	0–1	—	10,437	0–1	—	0–2
2025–26	Europa League	QR1	(Cyprus) AEK Larnaca	23,253	2–1	Ugrešić 69', D. Jovanović 118'	4,127	0–1	—	2–2 (5–6 p)
2025–26	Conference League	QR2	(Ukraine) Oleksandriya	27,775	4–0	J. Milošević 13', 23', 45', Vukotić 63'	776	2–0	B. Kostić 14', Ugrešić 56'	6–0
2025–26	Conference League	QR3	(Scotland) Hibernian	26,342	0–2	—	19,377	3–2	Vukotić 17', J. Milošević 44', A. Kostić 90+6'	3–4

== Penalty shoot-out history ==
Season	Competition	Venue	Opponent	Full-time result	Shoot-out result
1978–79	European Cup	Dresden	(East Germany) Dynamo Dresden	0–2 (2–2 Agg.)	4–5
1990–91	UEFA Cup	Belgrade	(Spain) Real Sociedad	1–0 (1–1 Agg.)	4–3
1991–92	UEFA Cup	Istanbul*	(Spain) Sporting de Gijón	2–0 (2–2 Agg.)	2–3
2003–04	UEFA Champions League	Newcastle upon Tyne	(England) Newcastle United	1–0 (1–1 Agg.)	4–3
2005–06	UEFA Champions League	Belgrade	(Slovakia) Artmedia Petržalka	0–0 (0–0 Agg.)	3–4
2010–11	UEFA Champions League	Brussels	(Belgium) Anderlecht	2–2 (4–4 Agg.)	3–2
2016–17	UEFA Europa League	Lubin	(Poland) Zagłębie Lubin	0–0 (0–0 Agg.)	3–4
2021–22	UEFA Europa Conference League	Belgrade	(Russia) Sochi	2–2 (3–3 Agg.)	4–2
2023–24	UEFA Europa Conference League	Belgrade	(Azerbaijan) Sabah	2–0 (2–2 Agg.)	5–4
2025–26	UEFA Europa League	Belgrade	(Cyprus) AEK Larnaca	2–1 (2–2 Agg.)	5–6

== Mitropa Cup ==
The Mitropa Cup, officially called the La Coupe de l'Europe Centrale or Central European Cup, was one of the first international major European football cups for club sides. After World War II in 1951 a replacement tournament named Zentropa Cup was held, but just for one season, the Mitropa Cup name was revived, and again in 1958 the name of tournament changed in Danube Cup but only for one season. The tournament declined and was discontinued after 1992.

The greatest success was achieved in 1977–78 season, when they won the competition.

Season	Competition	Round	Opponent	Home	Away	Agg.
1956	Mitropa Cup	QF	(Austria) Wacker Wien	1–1	1–1	2–2^{1}
1956	Mitropa Cup	SF	(Hungary) Vasas	1–0	1–6	2–6
1958	Danube Cup	R16	(Czechoslovakia) Tatran Prešov	4–2	1–4	5–6
1959	Mitropa Cup	QF	(Czechoslovakia) Baník Ostrava	3–2	1–1	4–3
1959	Mitropa Cup	SF	(Hungary) Honvéd	3–3	2–2	5–5 (a)
1960	Mitropa Cup	/	(Czechoslovakia) Slovan Bratislava	2–1	1–4	3–5
1962	Mitropa Cup					
1962	Mitropa Cup	Group 2	(Hungary) MTK Budapest	2–1	1–4	3rd out of 4
1962	Mitropa Cup	Group 2	(Czechoslovakia) Baník Ostrava	2–2	1–1	3rd out of 4
1962	Mitropa Cup	Group 2	(Italy) Atalanta	2–2	3–3	3rd out of 4
1971–72	Mitropa Cup					
1971–72	Mitropa Cup	Group B	(Austria) First Vienna FC	3–0	4–1	2nd out of 3
1971–72	Mitropa Cup	Group B	(Italy) Fiorentina	2–1	0–3	2nd out of 3
1977–78	Mitropa Cup					
1977–78	Mitropa Cup	Group B	(Czechoslovakia) Zbrojovka Brno	5–1	3–2	1st out of 3
1977–78	Mitropa Cup	Group B	(Italy) Perugia	4–0	1–2	1st out of 3
1977–78	Mitropa Cup	Final	(Hungary) Honvéd	1–0		

== Goals in UEFA competitions ==
=== Top scorers in UEFA competitions ===
As of 26 June 2023

Rank	Player	Goals	Years
1	(Cape Verde) Ricardo Gomes	20	2018–2019, 2021–2023
2	(Brazil) Cléo	16	2009–2011
3	(Serbia and Montenegro) (Serbia) Saša Ilić	15	1996–2005, 2010–2019
4	(Socialist Federal Republic of Yugoslavia) Vladica Kovačević	13	1959–1966, 1967–1970
5	(Socialist Federal Republic of Yugoslavia) Mustafa Hasanagić	9	1962–1969
5	(Senegal) Lamine Diarra	9	2007–2010, 2011–2012
7	(Socialist Federal Republic of Yugoslavia) Miloš Milutinović	8	1952–1958
7	(Serbia) Nemanja Tomić	8	2009–2013
7	(Guinea) Seydouba Soumah	8	2017–2018, 2019–2021

=== Hat-tricks ===
N	Date	Player	Match	Score
1	12 October 1955	(Socialist Federal Republic of Yugoslavia) Miloš Milutinović^{4}	Partizan – (Portugal) Sporting CP	5–2
2	27 November 1963	(Socialist Federal Republic of Yugoslavia) Vladica Kovačević^{4}	Partizan – (Luxembourg) Jeunesse Esch	6–2
3	27 September 1967	(Socialist Federal Republic of Yugoslavia) Mustafa Hasanagić	Partizan – (Bulgaria) Lokomotiv Plovdiv	5–1
4	2 October 1985	(Socialist Federal Republic of Yugoslavia) Nebojša Vučićević	Partizan – (Portugal) Portimonense	4–0
5	24 August 2000	(Serbia) Saša Ilić	Partizan – (Malta) Sliema Wanderers	4–1
6	19 July 2007	(Senegal) Lamine Diarra	(Bosnia and Herzegovina) Zrinjski Mostar – Partizan	1–6
7	2 August 2007	(Montenegro) Stevan Jovetić	Partizan – (Bosnia and Herzegovina) Zrinjski Mostar	5–0
8	21 July 2009	(Brazil) Cléo	Partizan – (Wales) Rhyl	8–0
9	31 July 2025	(Serbia) Jovan Milošević	Partizan – (Ukraine) Oleksandriya	4–0

^{4} Player scored four goals

=== Hat-tricks by opponent ===
N	Date	Player	Match	Score
1	2 March 1966	(Czechoslovakia) Andrej Kvašňák	(Czechoslovakia) Sparta Prague – Partizan	4–1
2	30 September 1970	(East Germany) Hans-Jürgen Kreische^{4}	(East Germany) Dynamo Dresden – Partizan	6–0
3	28 November 1984	(Hungary) József Szabó^{4}	(Hungary) Videoton – Partizan	5–0
4	27 September 1989	(Poland) Dariusz Dziekanowski^{4}	(Scotland) Celtic – Partizan	5–4
5	1 October 2003	(Ivory Coast) Didier Drogba	(France) Marseille – Partizan	3–0
6	29 September 2005	(Israel) Omer Golan	Partizan – (Israel) Maccabi Petah Tikva	2–5
7	7 December 2017	(Ukraine) Júnior Moraes	(Ukraine) Dynamo Kyiv – Partizan	4–1

^{4} Player scored four goals

=== Own goals by opponent ===
N	Date	Player	Match	Score
1	23 October 1985	(France) Yvon Le Roux	Partizan – (France) Nantes	1–1
2	12 October 1988	(Bulgaria) Valeri Grekov	(Bulgaria) Slavia Sofia – Partizan	0–5
3	27 September 2001	(Czech Republic) René Wagner	(Austria) Rapid Wien – Partizan	5–1
4	19 September 2002	(Portugal) Hugo	(Portugal) Sporting CP – Partizan	1–3
5	4 November 2004	(Greece) Ioannis Christou	Partizan – (Greece) Egaleo	4–0
6	24 August 2010	(Czech Republic) Jan Lecjaks	Partizan – (Belgium) Anderlecht	2–2
7	13 July 2011	(North Macedonia) Sedat Berisha	Partizan – (North Macedonia) Shkëndija	4–0
8	21 August 2014	(Brazil) Denis Silva	Partizan – (Azerbaijan) Neftçi	3–2
9	21 August 2014	(Azerbaijan) Elvin Yunuszade	Partizan – (Azerbaijan) Neftçi	3–2
10	26 August 2015	(Belarus) Maksim Zhavnerchik	Partizan – (Belarus) BATE Borisov	2–1
11	26 July 2018	(Lithuania) Justinas Januševskij	Partizan – (Lithuania) Trakai	1–0

=== Own goals by Partizan players ===
N	Date	Player	Match	Score
1	16 September 1987	Aleksandar Đorđević	(Albania) Flamurtari Vlorë – Partizan	2–0
2	1 October 2009	Marko Lomić	(Ukraine) Shakhtar Donetsk – Partizan	4–1
3	22 October 2009	Rajko Brežančić	(Belgium) Club Brugge – Partizan	2–0

== Overall record ==
=== By country ===
As of 27 August 2026

FK Partizan record in European football by country
Opponents	Pld	W	D	L	GF	GA	GD
Albania	4	2	1	1	4	3	+1
Andorra	2	2	0	0	8	1	+7
Armenia	4	2	2	0	5	2	+3
Austria	2	1	0	1	2	5	−3
Azerbaijan	8	4	3	1	11	7	+4
Belarus	2	1	0	1	2	2	0
Belgium	12	0	4	8	10	20	−10
Bosnia and Herzegovina	2	2	0	0	11	1	+10
Bulgaria	10	3	3	4	21	13	−8
Croatia	4	3	0	1	7	6	+1
Cyprus	12	5	2	5	15	12	+3
Czech Republic	10	4	3	3	18	18	0
Denmark	4	2	0	2	5	9	−4
England	19	4	2	13	16	31	−15
Estonia	4	3	0	1	12	2	+10
Faroe Islands	2	2	0	0	6	1	+5
Finland	2	2	0	0	5	1	+4
France	11	1	4	6	11	22	−11
Germany	19	7	1	11	17	32	−15
Georgia	4	3	0	1	5	1	+4
Greece	5	1	2	2	7	7	0
Hungary	6	3	1	2	8	8	0
Republic of Ireland	2	0	1	1	2	3	−1
Israel	5	3	0	2	8	7	+1
Italy	15	1	4	10	14	32	−18
Kazakhstan	4	4	0	0	11	3	+8
Latvia	1	1	0	0	1	0	+1
Lithuania	2	1	1	0	2	1	+1
Luxembourg	4	3	0	1	12	4	+8
Malta	10	8	1	1	28	9	+19
Moldova	5	4	0	1	5	3	+2
Montenegro	4	3	1	0	8	0	+8
Netherlands	10	4	2	4	22	23	−1
North Macedonia	2	2	0	0	5	0	+5
Northern Ireland	2	1	1	0	6	1	+5
Norway	6	3	2	1	11	6	+5
Poland	4	1	3	0	5	2	+3
Portugal	16	5	5	6	27	21	+6
Romania	12	5	4	3	13	10	+3
Russia	8	0	4	4	6	14	−8
Scotland	5	2	0	3	9	11	−2
Slovakia	6	3	3	0	6	1	+5
Slovenia	2	1	1	0	3	2	+1
Spain	15	4	2	9	12	25	−13
Sweden	4	1	3	0	8	4	+4
Switzerland	6	2	2	2	6	8	−2
Turkey	8	1	2	5	8	16	−8
Ukraine	14	4	1	9	16	31	−15
Wales	4	4	0	0	16	0	+16

=== UEFA Team ranking ===
Correct as of 23 Jun 2025.

Rank	Team	Points
78	(Austria) LASK	21.000
79	(Romania) FCSB	20.500
80	(Serbia) Partizan	20.000
81	(Switzerland) Lugano	19.250
82	(Portugal) Vitória	18.750
