= 1984–85 FK Partizan season =

Partizan
1984–85 season
- President: Dragan Papović
- Head coach: Miloš Milutinović (until 19 August 1984); Nenad Bjeković
- Yugoslav First League: 3rd
- Yugoslav Cup: Quarter-finals
- UEFA Cup: Third round
- Top goalscorer: League: All: Dragan Mance
- Average home league attendance: 11,471

The 1984–85 season was the 39th season in FK Partizan's existence. This article shows player statistics and matches that the club played during the 1984–85 season.

== Friendlies ==
Novi Sad tournament	Partizan (Socialist Federal Republic of Yugoslavia)	2–0	(Socialist Federal Republic of Yugoslavia) Dinamo Zagreb	Novi Sad
	Kaličanin Radomir Radulovic

Novi Sad tournament	Partizan (Socialist Federal Republic of Yugoslavia)	0–3	(Socialist Federal Republic of Yugoslavia) Željezničar Sarajevo	Novi Sad

== Competitions ==
=== Yugoslav First League ===
Pos	Team	Pld	W	D	L	GF	GA	GD	Pts	Qualification or relegation
1	Sarajevo (C)	34	19	10	5	51	30	+21	48	Qualification for European Cup first round
2	Hajduk Split	34	16	12	6	65	42	+23	44	Qualification for UEFA Cup first round
3	Partizan	34	14	11	9	46	34	+12	39	Qualification for UEFA Cup first round
4	Red Star Belgrade	34	16	6	12	63	38	+25	38	Qualification for Cup Winners' Cup first round
5	Vardar	34	16	5	13	67	58	+9	37	Qualification for UEFA Cup first round

Source: rsssf.org
Rules for classification: 1) points; 2) goal difference; 3) number of goals scored.
(C) Champions

==== Matches ====
19 August 1984 1	Partizan	2–0	Dinamo Zagreb	Belgrade
	Ješić 33'; Varga 41'			Stadium: JNA Stadium; Attendance: 20,000

26 August 1984 2	Hajduk Split	3–3	Partizan	Split
	Slišković 5'; Vulić 74'; Andrijašević 85'		Ješić 28'; Dimitrijević 63'; Varga 83'	Stadium: Stadion Poljud; Attendance: 30,000

2 September 1984 3	Partizan	0–0	Vojvodina	Belgrade
				Stadium: JNA Stadium; Attendance: 25,000

5 September 1984 4	Partizan	3–0	Budućnost	Belgrade
	Mance 8'; Varga 54'; Stevanović 70'			Stadium: JNA Stadium; Attendance: 18,000

8 September 1984 5	Priština	1–2	Partizan	Priština
			Mance 32', 60'	Attendance: 15,000

16 September 1984 6	Partizan	1–1	Osijek	Belgrade
	Varga 56'			Stadium: JNA Stadium; Attendance: 15,000

23 September 1984 7	Radnički Niš	1–0	Partizan	Niš

7 October 1984 8	Partizan	1–0	Sarajevo	Belgrade
	Radanović 82'			Stadium: JNA Stadium

28 October 1984 9	Velež	0–2	Partizan	Mostar

31 October 1984 10	Partizan	0–0	Iskra	Belgrade
				Stadium: JNA Stadium

4 November 1984 11	Vardar	1–0	Partizan	Skopje

11 November 1984 12	Partizan	2–1	Crvena zvezda	Belgrade
	Mance 40'; Varga 71'		Đurovski 75'	Stadium: JNA Stadium; Attendance: 50,000

17 November 1984 13	Sutjeska Nikšić	2–1	Partizan	Nikšić

21 November 1984 14	Partizan	1–1	Rijeka	Belgrade
				Stadium: JNA Stadium

25 November 1984 15	Dinamo Vinkovci	2–2	Partizan	Vinkovci

2 December 1984 16	Partizan	1–0	Sloboda Tuzla	Belgrade
				Stadium: JNA Stadium

9 December 1984 17	Željezničar	4–0	Partizan	Sarajevo

17 February 1985 18	Dinamo Zagreb	2–0	Partizan	Zagreb

24 February 1985 19	Partizan	4–1	Hajduk Split	Belgrade
	Đukić 2', 18'; Živković 61', 80'		Zl. Vujović 75'	Stadium: JNA Stadium; Attendance: 12,000; Referee: Vaso Vujović

3 March 1985 20	Vojvodina	0–0	Partizan	Novi Sad

10 March 1985 21	Budućnost	2–1	Partizan	Titograd
			Živković 58'	Attendance: 15,000

17 March 1985 22	Partizan	2–0	Priština	Belgrade
	Mance 33', 41'			Stadium: JNA Stadium; Attendance: 10,000

7 April 1985 23	Osijek	1–0	Partizan	Osijek
				Attendance: 10,000

14 April 1985 24	Partizan	2–2	Radnički Niš	Belgrade
	Đukić 12'; Vučićević 90'		Nikolić 54'; Rinčić 70'	Stadium: JNA Stadium

17 April 1985 25	Sarajevo	3–1	Partizan	Sarajevo
			Nikodijević 81'	Attendance: 10,000

21 April 1985 26	Partizan	2–0	Velež	Belgrade
	Đukić 6'; Vučićević 55'			Stadium: JNA Stadium; Attendance: 8,000

5 May 1985 27	Iskra	1–3	Partizan	Bugojno
	Vrabac 70'		Mance 50', 64', 83'

12 May 1985 28	Partizan	4–0	Vardar	Belgrade
	Đukić 14'; Varga 23', 29'; Kaličanin 62' (pen.)			Stadium: JNA Stadium

19 May 1985 29	Crvena zvezda	2–0	Partizan	Belgrade
	Kaličanin 43' (o.g.); Đurovski 70'			Stadium: Marakana; Attendance: 70,000

9 June 1985 30	Partizan	1–1	Sutjeska Nikšić	Belgrade
	Varga 21'		Đurović 8'	Stadium: JNA Stadium; Attendance: 8,000

12 June 1985 31	Rijeka	0–0	Partizan	Rijeka
				Stadium: Stadion Kantrida; Attendance: 12,000

16 June 1985 32	Partizan	3–1	Dinamo Vinkovci	Belgrade
	Mance 28'; Ješić 53' (pen.); Stevanović 81'		Žahirović 88'	Stadium: JNA Stadium; Attendance: 10,000

23 June 1985 33	Sloboda Tuzla	1–1	Partizan	Tuzla
	Miljanović 52'		Varga 30'	Attendance: 6,000

30 June 1985 34	Partizan	1–0	Željezničar	Belgrade
	Mance 65'			Stadium: JNA Stadium; Attendance: 20,000; Referee: Ilijevski

=== Yugoslav Cup ===
29 August 1984 Round of 32	Triglav	0–4	Partizan	Kranj
			Popović 30'; Mance 33', 80'; Dimitrijević 40'	Attendance: 3,000

10 October 1984 Round of 16	Partizan	0–0 (4–3 p)	Rijeka	Belgrade
				Stadium: JNA Stadium

13 March 1985 Quarter-finals	Partizan	0–2	Crvena zvezda	Belgrade
			Halilović 15'; Đurovski 83'	Stadium: JNA Stadium; Attendance: 50,000

=== UEFA Cup ===
==== First round ====
19 September 1984 First round 1st leg	Rabat Ajax (Malta)	0–2	(Socialist Federal Republic of Yugoslavia) Partizan	Ta' Qali, Malta
16:30		Report	Vučićević 63'; Đelmaš 70'	Stadium: Ta' Qali National Stadium; Attendance: 6,000; Referee: Jakob Baumann (Switzerland)

3 October 1984 First round 2nd leg	Partizan (Socialist Federal Republic of Yugoslavia)	2–0 (4 – 0 agg.)	(Malta) Rabat Ajax	Belgrade, Yugoslavia
17:30	Mance 18'; Stevanović 64'	Report		Stadium: JNA Stadium; Attendance: 12,000; Referee: Vasos Konstantinou (Cyprus)

==== Second round ====
24 October 1984 Second round 1st leg	Queens Park Rangers (England)	6–2	(Socialist Federal Republic of Yugoslavia) Partizan	London, England
20:45	Gregory 13'; Fereday 26'; Stainrod 44'; Neill 54'; Bannister 57', 83'	Report	Klinčarski 14'; Mance 25'	Stadium: Highbury Stadium; Attendance: 7,836; Referee: Karl-Heinz Tritschler (West Germany)

7 November 1984 Second round 2nd leg	Partizan (Socialist Federal Republic of Yugoslavia)	4–0 (6 – 6 a agg.)	(England) Queens Park Rangers	Belgrade, Yugoslavia
17:30	Mance 4'; Kaličanin 40' (pen.); Ješić 46'; Živković 64'	Report		Stadium: JNA Stadium; Attendance: 60,000; Referee: Valeri Butenko (Soviet Union)

==== Third round ====
28 November 1984 Third round 1st leg	Videoton (Hungary)	5–0	(Socialist Federal Republic of Yugoslavia) Partizan	Székesfehérvár, Hungary
20:45	Szabó 11', 48', 49' (pen.), 74'; Májer 80'	Report		Stadium: Sóstói Stadion; Attendance: 20,000; Referee: Siegfried Kirschen (East Germany)

12 December 1984 Third round 2nd leg	Partizan (Socialist Federal Republic of Yugoslavia)	2–0 (2 – 5 agg.)	(Hungary) Videoton	Belgrade, Yugoslavia
17:00	Živković 12'; Varga 45'	Report		Stadium: JNA Stadium; Attendance: 30,000; Referee: Franz Wöhrer (Austria)

== See also ==
- List of FK Partizan seasons
