= 1980–81 FK Partizan season =

Partizan
1980–81 season
- President: Vlada Kostić
- Head coach: Tomislav Kaloperović
- Yugoslav First League: 8th
- Yugoslav Cup: Semi-finals

The 1980–81 season was the 35th season in FK Partizan's existence. This article shows player statistics and matches that the club played during the 1980–81 season.

== Friendlies ==
4 August 1980 Friendly	Benfica (Portugal)	6–1	(Socialist Federal Republic of Yugoslavia) Partizan	Toronto, Canada

9 August 1980 Friendly	Crvena zvezda (Socialist Federal Republic of Yugoslavia)	3–0	(Socialist Federal Republic of Yugoslavia) Partizan	Belgrade
				Stadium: Marakana

10 August 1980 Friendly	Partizan (Socialist Federal Republic of Yugoslavia)	0–0	(England) Arsenal	Belgrade
				Stadium: Marakana

19 August 1980 Friendly	Real Zaragoza (Spain)	0–0	(Socialist Federal Republic of Yugoslavia) Partizan	Zaragoza, Spain

21 August 1980 Friendly	Sporting CP (Portugal)	2–1	(Socialist Federal Republic of Yugoslavia) Partizan	Zaragoza, Spain
	31'; 81' (pen.)		Grubješić 63' (pen.)

7 February 1981 Friendly	Partizan (Socialist Federal Republic of Yugoslavia)	0–1	(Soviet Union) Dinamo Tbilisi	Mostar
			76'

24 May 1981 Friendly	Wacker (Austria)	1–7	(Socialist Federal Republic of Yugoslavia) Partizan	Innsbruck, Austria

== Competitions ==
=== Yugoslav First League ===
Pos	Team	Pld	W	D	L	GF	GA	GD	Pts	Qualification or relegation
6	Budućnost	34	11	12	11	38	34	+4	34	Qualification for Intertoto Cup
7	Rijeka	34	12	10	12	50	47	+3	34	
8	Partizan	34	9	16	9	43	41	+2	34	
9	Velež	34	13	8	13	44	47	−3	34	Qualification for Cup Winners' Cup first round
10	Vojvodina	34	13	8	13	37	40	−3	34	

Source: rsssf.org
Rules for classification: 1) points; 2) goal difference; 3) number of goals scored.

17 August 1980 1	Partizan	4–1	Zagreb	Belgrade
	Klinčarski 18'; Vukotić 47'; Varga 60'; Grubješić 64'			Stadium: JNA Stadium; Attendance: 12,000

24 August 1980 2	Rijeka	2–1	Partizan	Rijeka
			Trifunović 22' (pen.)	Attendance: 12,000

31 August 1980 3	Partizan	0–1	Radnički Niš	Belgrade
				Stadium: JNA Stadium; Attendance: 20,000

6 September 1980 4	Sloboda Tuzla	2–1	Partizan	Tuzla
			Živković 36'	Attendance: 6,000

13 September 1980 5	Partizan	0–0	Borac Banja Luka	Belgrade
				Stadium: JNA Stadium; Attendance: 18,000

21 September 1980 6	Vardar	1–3	Partizan	Skopje
			Živković 52', 61', 88'	Attendance: 35,000

4 October 1980 7	Partizan	0–0	Željezničar	Belgrade
				Stadium: JNA Stadium; Attendance: 20,000

8 October 1980 8	Velež	2–1	Partizan	Mostar
			Varga 54'	Attendance: 8,000

12 October 1980 9	Partizan	0–0	Dinamo Zagreb	Belgrade
				Stadium: JNA Stadium; Attendance: 20,000

19 October 1980 10	Vojvodina	2–2	Partizan	Novi Sad
			Klinčarski 31'; Radović 61'	Attendance: 15,000

25 October 1980 11	Partizan	2–2	Olimpija	Belgrade
	Živković 54'; Vukotić 76'			Stadium: JNA Stadium; Attendance: 5,000

29 October 1980 12	Budućnost	1–2	Partizan	Titograd
			Kaličanin 20' (pen.); Varga 31'	Attendance: 15,000

2 November 1980 13	Partizan	3–1	Napredak Kruševac	Belgrade
	Trifunović 18'; Đelmaš 79'; Ješić 90'			Stadium: JNA Stadium; Attendance: 6,000

9 November 1980 14	Hajduk Split	1–1	Partizan	Split
			Vukotić 34'	Attendance: 15,000

22 November 1980 15	Partizan	1–1	Sarajevo	Belgrade
	Živković 57'			Stadium: JNA Stadium; Attendance: 25,000

30 November 1980 16	OFK Beograd	1–2	Partizan	Belgrade
			Živković 25', 88'	Attendance: 6,000

7 December 1980 17	Partizan	3–1	Crvena zvezda	Belgrade
	Klinčarski 21'; Varga 51'; Vukotić 88'		Repčić 90'	Stadium: JNA Stadium; Attendance: 40,000

1 March 1981 18	Zagreb	2–3	Partizan	Zagreb
			Varga 25', 32'; Trifunović 76'	Attendance: 15,000

8 March 1981 19	Partizan	1–0	Rijeka	Belgrade
	Živković 62'			Stadium: JNA Stadium; Attendance: 30,000

15 March 1981 20	Radnički Niš	0–0	Partizan	Niš
				Attendance: 22,000

21 March 1981 21	Partizan	2–2	Sloboda Tuzla	Belgrade
	Kaličanin 20' (pen.); Prekazi 65'			Stadium: JNA Stadium; Attendance: 30,000

28 March 1981 22	Borac Banja Luka	2–1	Partizan	Banja Luka
			Živković 72'	Attendance: 8,000

5 April 1981 23	Partizan	2–2	Vardar	Belgrade
	Varga 26'; Živković 63' (pen.)			Stadium: JNA Stadium; Attendance: 10,000

12 April 1981 24	Željezničar	2–1	Partizan	Sarajevo
			Živković 54'	Attendance: 12,000

16 April 1981 25	Partizan	0–0	Velež	Belgrade
				Stadium: JNA Stadium; Attendance: 20,000

19 April 1981 26	Dinamo Zagreb	2–0	Partizan	Zagreb
				Attendance: 40,000

2 May 1981 27	Partizan	0–1	Vojvodina	Belgrade
				Stadium: JNA Stadium; Attendance: 8,000

10 May 1981 28	Olimpija	2–2	Partizan	Ljubljana
			Varga 11'; Živković 44'	Attendance: 10,000

16 May 1981 29	Partizan	0–0	Budućnost	Belgrade
				Stadium: JNA Stadium; Attendance: 12,000

27 May 1981 30	Napredak Kruševac	0–2	Partizan	Kruševac
			Ješić 17'; Varga 86'	Attendance: 12,000

31 May 1981 31	Partizan	0–4	Hajduk Split	Belgrade
				Stadium: JNA Stadium; Attendance: 35,000

7 June 1981 32	Sarajevo	1–1	Partizan	Sarajevo
			Živković 40'	Attendance: 16,000

10 June 1981 33	Partizan	1–1	OFK Beograd	Belgrade
	Vukotić 46'			Stadium: JNA Stadium; Attendance: 12,000

14 June 1981 34	Crvena zvezda	1–1	Partizan	Belgrade
	Repčić 70'		Vukotić 3'	Stadium: Marakana; Attendance: 50,000

=== Yugoslav Cup ===
15 October 1980 Round of 32	Partizan	2–2 (6–4 p)	Rijeka	Belgrade
	Trifunović 67'; Klinčarski 83' (pen.)			Stadium: JNA Stadium; Attendance: 10,000

19 November 1980 Round of 16	Partizan	5–0	Napredak Kruševac	Belgrade
	Trifunović 36'; Klinčarski 66'; Kaličanin 70' (pen.); Vukotić 77'; Stojković 87'			Stadium: JNA Stadium; Attendance: 9,000

22 February 1981 Quarter-finals	Partizan	2–0	Sloboda Tuzla	Belgrade
	Varga 75'; Đelmaš 88'			Stadium: JNA Stadium; Attendance: 20,000

1 April 1981 Semi-finals	Željezničar	2–0	Partizan	Sarajevo
				Attendance: 22,000

== See also ==
- List of FK Partizan seasons
