= 1983–84 FK Partizan season =

Partizan
1983–84 season
- President: Dragan Papović
- Head coach: Miloš Milutinović
- Yugoslav First League: Runners-up
- Yugoslav Cup: First round
- European Cup: Second round
- Average home league attendance: 16,647

The 1983–84 season was the 38th season in FK Partizan's existence. This article shows player statistics and matches that the club played during the 1983–84 season.

== Friendlies ==
| 5 August 1983 Belgrade tournament | Partizan (Socialist Federal Republic of Yugoslavia) | 3-2 | (Socialist Federal Republic of Yugoslavia) Radnički Niš | Belgrade |
| | Šalja; Živković Varga | | | Stadium: JNA; Attendance: 15,000; Referee: Vlajić |

| 7 August 1983 Belgrade tournament | Crvena Zvezda (Socialist Federal Republic of Yugoslavia) | 1-2 | (Socialist Federal Republic of Yugoslavia) Partizan | Belgrade |
| | | | Prekazi Prekazi | Stadium: Marakana; Attendance: 60,000; Referee: Petrovic |

| 27 July 1983 Trofej Marjan | Partizan (Socialist Federal Republic of Yugoslavia) | 2–1 | (Socialist Federal Republic of Yugoslavia) Dinamo Zagreb | Split |
| | Mance Mance | | | Stadium: Poljud |

| 28 July 1983 Trofej Marjan | Hajduk Split (Socialist Federal Republic of Yugoslavia) | 3–0 | (Socialist Federal Republic of Yugoslavia) FK Partizan | Split |
| | | | | Stadium: Poljud; Attendance: 40,000 |

== Competitions ==
=== Yugoslav First League ===
| Pos | Team | Pld | W | D | L | GF | GA | GD | Pts | Qualification or relegation |
|---|---|---|---|---|---|---|---|---|---|---|
| 1 | Red Star Belgrade (C) | 34 | 17 | 10 | 7 | 52 | 26 | +26 | 44 | Qualification for European Cup first round |
| 2 | Partizan | 34 | 15 | 12 | 7 | 43 | 25 | +18 | 42 | Qualification for UEFA Cup first round |
| 3 | Željezničar | 34 | 15 | 12 | 7 | 52 | 35 | +17 | 42 | Qualification for UEFA Cup first round |
| 4 | Rijeka | 34 | 16 | 10 | 8 | 53 | 37 | +16 | 42 | Qualification for UEFA Cup first round |
| 5 | Hajduk Split | 34 | 12 | 15 | 7 | 39 | 22 | +17 | 39 | Qualification for Cup Winners' Cup first round |

Source: rsssf.org
Rules for classification: 1) points; 2) goal difference; 3) number of goals scored.
(C) Champions

==== Matches ====
| 14 August 1983 1 | Partizan | 1–0 | Budućnost | Belgrade |
| | Vukotić 68' | | | Stadium: Stadion JNA; Referee: Ristić |

| 21 August 1983 2 | Priština | 2–1 | Partizan | Priština |
| | Batrović 33' ? ?' | | Mance 15' | Attendance: 35,000; Referee: Slobodan Martinović |

| 28 August 1983 3 | Partizan | 1–0 | Dinamo Vinkovci | Belgrade |
| | Mance 74' | | | Stadium: Stadion JNA |

| 31 August 1983 4 | Partizan | 2–1 | Rijeka | Belgrade |
| | Mance 51'; Živković 78' | | Lukić 40' | Stadium: Stadion JNA |

| 4 September 1983 5 | Dinamo Zagreb | 1–1 | Partizan | Zagreb |
| | Cerin 21' | | Smajić 51' | Stadium: Stadion Maksimir; Attendance: 40,000 |

| 11 September 1983 6 | Partizan | 2–2 | Olimpija | Belgrade |
| | Prekazi 18'; Varga 57' | | ? 65' ? ?' | Stadium: Stadion JNA; Attendance: 15,000 |

| 18 September 1983 7 | Vojvodina | 3–0 | Partizan | Novi Sad |

| 25 September 1983 8 | Partizan | 2–0 | Sarajevo | Belgrade |
| | Živković 85', 86' | | | Stadium: Stadion JNA; Attendance: 8,000 |

| 2 October 1983 9 | Čelik | 1–1 | Partizan | Zenica |

| 5 October 1983 10 | Partizan | 3–0 | Osijek | Belgrade |
| | | | | Stadium: Stadion JNA |

| 16 October 1983 11 | Vardar | 0–0 | Partizan | Skopje |

| 23 October 1983 12 | Partizan | 0–0 | Crvena Zvezda | Belgrade |
| | | | | Stadium: Stadion JNA; Attendance: 50,000 |

| 29 October 1983 13 | Velež | 0–0 | Partizan | Mostar |

| 6 November 1983 14 | Partizan | 1–2 | Radnički Niš | Belgrade |
| | | | | Stadium: Stadion JNA |

| 20 November 1983 15 | Hajduk Split | 0–0 | Partizan | Split |
| | | | | Stadium: Stadion Poljud; Attendance: 27,000 |

| 27 November 1983 16 | Partizan | 2–1 | Sloboda Tuzla | Belgrade |
| | | | | Stadium: Stadion JNA |

| 4 December 1983 17 | Željezničar | 1–1 | Partizan | Sarajevo |

| 26 February 1984 18 | Budućnost | 1–0 | Partizan | Titograd |

| 29 February 1984 19 | Partizan | 1–0 | Priština | Belgrade |
| | | | | Stadium: Stadion JNA |

| 4 March 1984 20 | Dinamo Vinkovci | 1–0 | Partizan | Vinkovci |

| 11 March 1984 21 | Rijeka | 3–0 | Partizan | Rijeka |

| 18 March 1984 22 | Partizan | 1–0 | Dinamo Zagreb | Belgrade |
| | Vukotić 38' | | | Stadium: Stadion JNA |

| 25 March 1984 23 | Olimpija | 0–0 | Partizan | Ljubljana |

| 28 March 1984 24 | Partizan | 2–0 | Vojvodina | Belgrade |
| | | | | Stadium: Stadion JNA |

| 8 April 1984 25 | Sarajevo | 0–1 | Partizan | Sarajevo |

| 15 April 1984 26 | Partizan | 5–2 | Čelik | Belgrade |
| | | | | Stadium: Stadion JNA |

| 21 April 1984 27 | Osijek | 0–0 | Partizan | Osijek |

| 29 April 1984 28 | Partizan | 5–2 | Vardar | Belgrade |
| | | | | Stadium: Stadion JNA |

| 6 May 1984 29 | Crvena zvezda | 0–0 | Partizan | Belgrade |

| 13 May 1984 30 | Partizan | 3–0 | Velež | Belgrade |
| | | | | Stadium: Stadion JNA |

| 16 May 1984 31 | Radnički Niš | 0–5 | Partizan | Niš |

| 20 May 1984 32 | Partizan | 1–0 | Hajduk Split | Belgrade |
| | Radanović 58' (pen.) | | | Stadium: Marakana*; Attendance: 70,000 |

| 27 May 1984 33 | Sloboda Tuzla | 1–1 | Partizan | Tuzla |
| | | | Vukotić | Attendance: 9,000 |

| 30 May 1984 34 | Partizan | 0–1 | Željezničar | Belgrade |
| | | | | Stadium: Stadion JNA |

=== Yugoslav Cup ===
| 21 September 1983 Round of 32 | OFK Beograd | 1–0 | Partizan | Belgrade |
| | | | | Attendance: 15,000 |

=== European Cup ===
==== First round ====
| 14 September 1983 First round 1st leg | Partizan (Socialist Federal Republic of Yugoslavia) | 5–1 | (Norway) Viking | Belgrade, Yugoslavia |
| | Dimitrijević 27', 38' (pen.); Prekazi 44'; Živković 82', 87' | Report | Goodchild 36' | Stadium: Stadion JNA; Attendance: 30,000; Referee: Franz Wöhrer (Austria) |

| 28 September 1983 First round 2nd leg | Viking (Norway) | 0–0 (1 – 5 agg.) | (Socialist Federal Republic of Yugoslavia) Partizan | Stavanger, Norway |
| | | Report | | Stadium: Stavanger Stadion; Attendance: 2,000; Referee: Bo Helén (Sweden) |

==== Second round ====
| 19 October 1983 Second round 1st leg | Dynamo Berlin (East Germany) | 2–0 | (Socialist Federal Republic of Yugoslavia) Partizan | East Berlin, East Germany |
| | Götz 1'; Ernst 37' | Report | | Stadium: Friedrich-Ludwig-Jahn-Sportpark; Attendance: 19,500; Referee: Romualdas Yushka (Soviet Union) |

| 2 November 1983 Second round 2nd leg | Partizan (Socialist Federal Republic of Yugoslavia) | 1–0 (1 – 2 agg.) | (East Germany) Dynamo Berlin | Belgrade, Yugoslavia |
| | Prekazi 27' | Report | | Stadium: Stadion JNA; Attendance: 55,000; Referee: Bogdan Dochev (Bulgaria) |

== See also ==
- List of FK Partizan seasons
