= Slobodan Branković (footballer) =

Serbian footballer

Personal information
- Date of birth: 9 December 1963 (age 62)
- Place of birth: Belgrade, SFR Yugoslavia
- Height: 1.82 m (6 ft 0 in)
- Position: Forward

Youth career
- 1978–1985: Partizan

Senior career*
Years	Team	Apps	(Gls)
1985	Rad		
1986-1987	First Vienna	16	(2)
1988-1989	VSE St. Pölten	32	(8)
1989-1991	Vorwärts Steyr	52	(13)
1991-1992	VSE St. Pölten	21	(7)
1992	First Vienna		
1992-1993	VfB Mödling	19	(5)
1993-1994	Kremser SC		
1994	SC Fürstenfeld		
1995	Austria Amateure		
1995-1996	LAC Inter		
1996-1998	SV Wallern		
1998-2000	LAC Inter		
2000-2001	ASV Spratzern		
2002	LAC Inter		
- * Club domestic league appearances and goals

Slobodan Branković (Serbian Cyrillic: Слободан Бранковић; born 9 December 1963) is a Serbian retired footballer.

== Football career ==
=== Beginnings ===
Branković, born in the Banovo Brdo neighborhood of Belgrade, began his footballing career with Partizan's youth academy in 1978 where he played alongside the late Čava Dimitrijević and former Partizan head coach Vladimir Vermezović. Here he got the nickname of Kengur, the Serbian language word for kangaroo. He remained in Partizan's youth academy until 1985 when he signed with FK Rad who was then in the Yugoslav Second League. Upon signing for Rad however, he was immediately released by Milan Živadinović.

=== Austria ===
After his departure from Rad, Branković did not play anywhere for two months until he arrived in Austria for a try-out with First Vienna FC. The try-out was arranged by well-known Serbian sports commentator Vladanko Stojaković. First Vienna had just signed Argentinian great Mario Kempes. Branković was signed (this being his first professional contract with a fully professional club) and formed a formidable tandem with Kempes. Branković even earned the nickname of the Serbian Mario Kempes due to their similar playing style and similar physique.
