= Slobodan Branković =

Slobodan Branković may refer to:

- Slobodan Branković (footballer) (born 1963), Serbian former footballer
- Slobodan Branković (sprinter) (born 1967), Serbian former Yugoslavian sprinter and athletics administrator
