= 1990–91 FK Partizan season =

Partizan
1990–91 season
- President: Ivan Ćurković
- Head coach: Miloš Milutinović
- Yugoslav First League: 3rd
- Yugoslav Cup: Round of 16
- UEFA Cup: Third Round
- Top goalscorer: League: All: Predrag Mijatović

The 1990–91 season was the 45th season in FK Partizan's existence. This article shows player statistics and matches that the club played during the 1990–91 season.

== Competitions ==
=== Yugoslav First League ===
Pos	Team	Pld	W	PKW	PKL	L	GF	GA	GD	Pts	Qualification or relegation
1	Red Star Belgrade (C)	36	25	4	2	5	88	35	+53	54	Qualification for European Cup first round
2	Dinamo Zagreb (Note: After the season, Croatian and Slovenian clubs left the Yugoslav federation and formed their own leagues. Dinamo Zagreb, Hajduk Split, Osijek and Rijeka joined 1992 Prva HNL, while Olimpija joined 1991–92 Slovenian PrvaLiga.)	36	20	6	4	6	72	36	+36	46	Qualification for UEFA Cup first round and Prva HNL
3	Partizan	36	18	5	3	10	62	36	+26	41	Qualification for UEFA Cup first round
4	Proleter Zrenjanin	36	17	1	3	15	50	49	+1	35	Qualification for Intertoto Cup
5	Borac Banja Luka	36	14	7	4	11	42	38	+4	35	

Source: rsssf.org
Rules for classification: 1) points; 2) goal difference; 3) number of goals scored.
(C) Champion
Notes:

5 August 1990 1	Borac Banja Luka	0–0 (4–5 p)	Partizan	Banja Luka
				Attendance: 12,000

12 August 1990 2	Vojvodina	1–2	Partizan	Novi Sad
	Dakić 51'		Đurđević 21'; Šćepović 41'	Attendance: 15,000

19 August 1990 3	Partizan	4–1	Zemun	Belgrade
	Đurđević 12'; Šćepović 16'; Stevanović 40'; Mijatović 80'		Kitanov 68'	Stadium: JNA Stadium; Attendance: 9,000

1 September 1990 4	Partizan	2–1	Dinamo Zagreb	Belgrade
	Jokanović 13'; Đurđević 39' (pen.)		Šuker 50'	Stadium: JNA Stadium; Attendance: 25,000

15 September 1990 5	Osijek	3–2	Partizan	Osijek
			Pantić 81'; Miličević 83' (a.g.)	Stadium: Stadion Gradski vrt Attendance: 3,000

23 September 1990 6	Partizan	2–0	Sarajevo	Belgrade
	Đurđević 14'; Šćepović 52'			Stadium: JNA Stadium; Attendance: 7,000

26 September 1990 7	Hajduk Split	0–3 (Note: Match abandoned due to crowd trouble. Therefore, the match was awarded to Partizan.)	Partizan	Split
			Đurđević ?', 71'	Stadium: Poljud; Attendance: 20,000

30 September 1990 8	Partizan	1–1 (4–2 p)	Spartak Subotica	Belgrade
	Šćepović 78'		Kuntić 90'	Stadium: JNA Stadium; Attendance: 7,000

7 October 1990 9	Sloboda Tuzla	3–1	Partizan	Tuzla
			Višnjić 31'	Attendance: 5,000

13 October 1990 10	Partizan	1–1 (3–5 p)	Crvena zvezda	Belgrade
	Vujačić 16'		Savićević 57'	Stadium: JNA Stadium; Attendance: 50,000

20 October 1990 11	Rad	2–1	Partizan	Belgrade
	Drulović 6'; Vasić 17'		Višnjić 21' (pen.)	Attendance: 7,000

3 November 1990 12	Partizan	0–2	Proleter	Belgrade
			Mihajlović 37' (pen.); Ivić 58'	Stadium: JNA Stadium; Attendance: 10,000

18 November 1990 13	Radnički Niš	0–3	Partizan	Niš
			Jokanović 27'; Mijatović 73', 90'	Stadium: Čair Stadium; Attendance: 15,000

25 November 1990 14	Partizan	3–0	Željezničar	Belgrade
	Mijatović 58'; Đurđević 64'; Jokanović 86'			Stadium: JNA Stadium; Attendance: 3,000

2 December 1990 15	Olimpija	0–1	Partizan	Ljubljana
			Đurđević 65'	Attendance: 5,000

5 December 1990 16	Partizan	2–1	Budućnost	Belgrade
	Jokanović 56'; Mijatović 79'		89'	Stadium: JNA Stadium; Attendance: 2,000

9 December 1990 17	Velež	0–1	Partizan	Mostar
			Mijatović 74'	Attendance: 4,000

16 December 1990 18	Partizan	1–2	Rijeka	Belgrade
	Đurđević 30'		Rubčić 42'; Komljenović 69'	Stadium: JNA Stadium; Attendance: 3,000

17 February 1991 19	Partizan	2–2 (4–3 p)	Borac Banja Luka	Belgrade
	Đukić; Mijatović		Lukić; Špica	Stadium: JNA Stadium; Attendance: 3,000

24 February 1991 20	Partizan	3–0	Vojvodina	Belgrade
	Stevanović 27'; Mijatović 66'; Višnjić 69'			Stadium: JNA Stadium; Attendance: 3,000

3 March 1991 21	Zemun	2–2 (4–2 p)	Partizan	Belgrade
	Ćurović 40'; Stojanović 76'		Vujačić 53'; Đukić 64'	Attendance: 4,000

17 March 1991 22	Dinamo Zagreb	0–0 (4–3 p)	Partizan	Zagreb
				Attendance: 30,000

23 March 1991 23	Partizan	4–0	Osijek	Belgrade
	Stevanović 34'; Milanič 51'; Višnjić 71'; Mijatović 72'			Stadium: JNA Stadium; Attendance: 7,000

31 March 1991 24	Sarajevo	1–0	Partizan	Sarajevo
	Puhalak 73'			Attendance: 6,000

7 April 1991 24	Partizan	4–0	Hajduk Split	Belgrade
	Stevanović 21'; Đukić 69'; Mijatović 75'; Stanojković 80'			Stadium: JNA Stadium; Attendance: 10,000

14 April 1991 26	Spartak Subotica	0–1	Partizan	Subotica
			Višnjić 53'	Attendance: 2,000

21 April 1991 27	Partizan	3–1	Sloboda Tuzla	Belgrade
	Bogdanović 6'; Đukić 13'; S. Đukić 55'		Mrkić 29'	Stadium: JNA Stadium; Attendance: 5,000

27 April 1991 28	Crvena zvezda	3–1	Partizan	Belgrade
	Najdoski 10'; Prosinečki 20'; Jugović 30'		Mijatović 43'	Stadium: Marakana; Attendance: 50,000; Referee: Zoran Petrović

5 May 1991 29	Partizan	0–0 (5–4 p)	Rad	Belgrade
				Stadium: JNA Stadium; Attendance: 2,000

11 May 1991 30	Proleter Zrenjanin	2–2 (2–3 p)	Partizan	Zrenjanin
	Mihajlović 28'; Dubajić 63'		Višnjić 69'; Mijatović 90'	Attendance: 7,000

19 May 1991 31	Partizan	3–1	Radnički Niš	Belgrade
	Višnjić 21' (pen.); Stevanović 39'; Bogdanović 89'		Stojiljković 43'	Stadium: JNA Stadium; Attendance: 2,000

26 May 1991 32	Željezničar	1–0	Partizan	Sarajevo
	Slišković 82'			Attendance: 8,000

2 June 1991 33	Partizan	1–0	Olimpija	Belgrade
	Vujačić 19'			Stadium: JNA Stadium; Attendance: 2,500

5 June 1991 34	Budućnost	2–1	Partizan	Titograd
	Leković 4' (pen.); Drobnjak 23'		Višnjić 2'	Attendance: 4,000

9 June 1991 35	Partizan	5–0	Velež	Belgrade
	Višnjić 8', 77'; Mijatović 67', 81'; Bogdanović 90'			Stadium: JNA Stadium; Attendance: 2,000

16 June 1991 36	Rijeka	3–0	Partizan	Rijeka
	Florijančič 4', 30'; Paliska 13'			Attendance: 6,000

=== Yugoslav Cup ===
8 August 1990 Round of 32	Partizan	2–0	Sutjeska Nikšić	Belgrade
	Vujačić 14'; Mijatović 81'			Stadium: JNA Stadium; Attendance: 3,000

15 August 1990 Round of 16 1st leg	Budućnost	2–0	Partizan	Titograd
				Attendance: 10,000

22 August 1990 Round of 16 2nd leg	Partizan	1–0 (1–2 agg.)	Budućnost	Belgrade
	Višnjić 12'			Stadium: JNA Stadium

=== UEFA Cup ===
==== First round ====
18 September 1990 First round 1st leg	Hibernians FC (Malta)	0–3	(Socialist Federal Republic of Yugoslavia) Partizan	Ta' Qali, Malta
			Đurđević 16'; Đorđević 81'; Mijatović 89'	Stadium: Ta' Qali National Stadium; Attendance: 2,000; Referee: Ilias Karamanis (Greece)

3 October 1990 First round 2nd leg	Partizan (Socialist Federal Republic of Yugoslavia)	2–0 (5 – 0 agg.)	(Malta) Hibernians FC	Belgrade, Yugoslavia
	Stevanović 25'; Šćepović 80'			Stadium: JNA Stadium; Attendance: 10,000; Referee: Loizos Loizou (Cyprus)

==== Second round ====
24 October 1990 Second round 1st leg	Real Sociedad (Spain)	1–0	(Socialist Federal Republic of Yugoslavia) Partizan	San Sebastián, Spain
	Larrañaga 90'			Stadium: Atotxa Stadium; Attendance: 21,600; Referee: Peter Mikkelsen (Denmark)

1 November 1990 Second round 2nd leg	Partizan (Socialist Federal Republic of Yugoslavia)	1–0 (a.e.t.) (1 – 1 agg.) (4–3 p)	(Spain) Real Sociedad	Belgrade, Yugoslavia
	Stevanović 48'			Stadium: JNA Stadium; Attendance: 45,000; Referee: Rosario Lo Bello (Italy)

==== Third round ====
28 November 1990 Third round 1st leg	Internazionale (Italy)	3–0	(Socialist Federal Republic of Yugoslavia) Partizan	Milan, Italy
	Matthäus 32'; Mandorlini 49'; Bianchi 70'			Stadium: San Siro; Attendance: 63,071; Referee: Helmut Kohl (Austria)

12 December 1990 Third round 2nd leg	Partizan (Socialist Federal Republic of Yugoslavia)	1–1 (1 – 4 agg.)	(Italy) Internazionale	Belgrade, Yugoslavia
	Stevanović 63'		Matthäus 88'	Stadium: JNA Stadium; Attendance: 33,500; Referee: Michel Vautrot (France)

== See also ==
- List of FK Partizan seasons
