= Milonja Đukić =

Serbian footballer

Personal information
- Full name: Milonja Đukić
- Date of birth: 12 December 1965 (age 60)
- Place of birth: Ivangrad, SFR Yugoslavia
- Height: 1.88 m (6 ft 2 in)
- Position: Striker

Senior career*
| Years | Team | Apps | (Gls) |
| 1984–1987 | Partizan | 39 | (6) |
| 1987 | Vojvodina | 7 | (0) |
| 1988 | Sutjeska Nikšić | 13 | (7) |
| 1988–1989 | Partizan | 22 | (5) |
| 1989–1990 | Olimpija Ljubljana | 28 | (9) |
| 1990–1991 | Trabzonspor | 15 | (6) |
| 1991–1998 | Farense | 180 | (32) |
| Total | | 304 | (65) |
- * Club domestic league appearances and goals

Milonja Đukić (Serbian Cyrillic: Милоња Ђукић; born 12 December 1965) is a Montenegrin-born Serbian retired footballer.

== Club career ==
He spent part of his career at FK Partizan playing in the Yugoslav First League. He also played for NK Olimpija Ljubljana. In 1990, he moved to Turkey to play for Trabzonspor in the Super Lig. He later spent seven seasons with S.C. Farense in the Portuguese Liga. With FK Partizan he won national Championship (1986) and national Cup (1989).
