= Vladimir Vermezović =

Serbian football player and manager (born 1963)

Personal information
- Date of birth: 30 June 1963 (age 63)
- Place of birth: Belgrade, SFR Yugoslavia
- Position: Defender

Youth career
- 1975–1977: Železnik
- 1977–1981: Partizan

Senior career*
Years	Team	Apps	(Gls)
1981–1989	Partizan	144	(2)
1989–1990	Sporting Gijón	20	(0)
1990–1991	Salamanca	21	(1)
1991–1995	Panionios	33	(1)
1995–1996	Hannover 96	11	(1)
Total		229	(5)

International career
1985	Yugoslavia	2	(0)

Managerial career
- 2002–2003: Teleoptik
- 2004–2005: Partizan
- 2008: Spartak Trnava
- 2009–2012: Kaizer Chiefs
- 2012–2013: Partizan
- 2014: Orlando Pirates
- 2017–2018: Budućnost Podgorica
- 2020–2021: Hatta
- 2023–2024: Mura
- * Club domestic league appearances and goals

Vladimir Vermezović (Serbian Cyrillic: Владимир Вермезовић; born 30 June 1963) is a Serbian football manager and former player.

== Playing career ==
Vermezović started playing football with Partizan in the Yugoslav First League, before moving abroad to play in Spain for Sporting de Gijón and UD Salamanca. He also played in Greece for Panionios F.C. and finished his playing career with German side Hannover 96.

He earned two caps for Yugoslavia in 1985.

== Managerial career ==
Following his retirement, Vermezović began coaching with Teleoptik.

Vermezović became the head coach of Partizan on 6 January 2004. In the 2004–05 season, he won the domestic league without defeat, and that season he led the team to the 2004–05 UEFA Cup Round of 16. He coached sixteen straight matches with Partizan in European competition which was the club's biggest success in Europe since the 1988–89 season. In the following 2005–06 season however, the club recorded weaker results. After failing to qualify for the Champions League against Slovakia's Artmedia and a shocking elimination in the first round of the UEFA Cup by little-known Israeli side Maccabi Petah Tikva, he resigned as coach in early October 2005.

He had a brief spell with Spartak Trnava before joining South African side Kaizer Chiefs in 2009.

In May 2012, he returned to Partizan and became head coach again. He ended his second spell in charge of Partizan in April 2013.

On 14 February 2014, he was appointed head coach of South African outfit Orlando Pirates. Although he led the team to Nedbank Cup success in May, he left the club later that year, resigning from his position due to a string of poor results in the 2014–15 season.

On 22 November 2020, he was appointed head coach of Emirati side Hatta. However, he left the club in May 2021 as he failed to keep the club in the league.

On 6 September 2023, Vermezović was unveiled as new head coach of Slovenian PrvaLiga club Mura.

== Personal life ==
In the Serbian press, he is commonly referred to by his nickname Čika Crni (Mister Black).

== Honours ==
=== As manager ===
Partizan

- First League of Serbia and Montenegro: 2004–05

Kaizer Chiefs

- Telkom Cup: 2009, 2010
- MTN 8 runner-up: 2011

Orlando Pirates

- MTN 8 runner-up: 2014
- Nedbank Cup: 2014
