= Zvonko Varga =

Serbian football manager and player

Personal information
- Date of birth: 27 November 1959 (age 66)
- Place of birth: Crvenka, FPR Yugoslavia
- Height: 1.78 m (5 ft 10 in)
- Position: Striker

Youth career
- Crvenka

Senior career*
Years	Team	Apps	(Gls)
1976–1977	Crvenka	1	(0)
1978–1986	Partizan	199	(58)
1986–1993	Club Liégeois	169	(65)
1993–1994	Seraing	24	(2)
1994–1995	Club Liégeois	28	(13)
1995–1997	Tilleur-Liégeois		
Total		421	(138)

International career
1979	Yugoslavia U20	3	(0)

Managerial career
- 1997: Tilleur-Liégeois
- 2000–2001: OFK Beograd
- 2002: Rad
- 2002–2003: Partizan (assistant)
- 2004: Sartid Smederevo
- 2004–2005: Partizan (assistant)
- 2005–2006: Teleoptik
- 2006–2007: Partizan (assistant)
- 2007: Qatar SC (assistant)
- 2008–2011: Teleoptik
- 2011: Ittihad (assistant)
- 2012–2015: Partizan (assistant)
- * Club domestic league appearances and goals

Zvonko Varga (Serbian Cyrillic: Звонко Варга; born 27 November 1959) is a Serbian football manager and former player.

== Club career ==
A striker, Varga made his senior debut at Crvenka in the Yugoslav Second League, before moving to Yugoslav First League side Partizan without his club's permission. He would occasionally train with Second League club Rad, before being cleared to play for Partizan. From then on, Varga spent eight seasons with the Crno-beli (1978–1986), making 199 appearances and scoring 58 goals in the top flight of Yugoslav football. He also won two national championship titles (1983 and 1986).

In 1986, Varga moved abroad to Belgium and played for Club Liégeois over the next seven seasons. He was the Belgian league's second-highest scorer in the 1988–89 season with 22 goals, one less than Eddie Krncevic. On 13 May 1989, Varga scored all six goals in his team's 6–1 home league win over Beerschot. He would win the Belgian Cup in the following 1989–90 campaign. In the summer of 1993, Varga switched to Seraing, but returned to Club Liégeois a year later.

== International career ==
At international level, Varga represented Yugoslavia at the 1979 FIFA World Youth Championship. He appeared in all three games, as the team exited the tournament at the group stage.

== Managerial career ==
After starting his managerial career with Tilleur-Liégeois, Varga went back to his homeland and took over the helm of OFK Beograd in 2000. He was also manager of Rad for several months, before being named assistant manager to Lothar Matthäus at Partizan. Following the departure of Matthäus, Varga left his position and became manager of Sartid Smederevo in January 2004. He resigned from the club after only four games. In June 2004, Varga returned to Partizan to be assistant manager to Vladimir Vermezović. He then served as co-manager of Teleoptik, alongside Blagoje Paunović, between 2005 and 2006, before returning to Partizan as an assistant.

In the second part of 2007, Varga was assistant manager to Dimitri Davidovic at Qatar SC. He then returned to Serbia, taking charge of Teleoptik in early 2008. Varga led them to promotion to the Serbian First League in 2009. He was released in January 2011. Varga again moved to the Middle East and joined Davidovic at Saudi Arabian outfit Ittihad in the second part of 2011. He returned to Partizan in 2012, being an assistant in the following three years.

== Personal life ==
Varga is the father of fellow footballer Saša Varga.

== Career statistics ==
Appearances and goals by club, season and competition
Club	Season	League			Continental		Total	
Club	Season	Division	Apps	Goals	Apps	Goals	Apps	Goals
Crvenka	1976–77	Yugoslav Second League	1	0	—		1	0
Partizan	1978–79	Yugoslav First League	20	0	2	0	22	0
Partizan	1979–80	Yugoslav First League	30	9	—		30	9
Partizan	1980–81	Yugoslav First League	29	9	—		29	9
Partizan	1981–82	Yugoslav First League	34	8	—		34	8
Partizan	1982–83	Yugoslav First League	20	3	—		20	3
Partizan	1983–84	Yugoslav First League	4	1	1	0	5	1
Partizan	1984–85	Yugoslav First League	30	11	3	1	33	12
Partizan	1985–86	Yugoslav First League	32	17	4	0	36	17
Partizan	Total		199	58	10	1	209	59
Club Liégeois	1986–87	Belgian First Division	31	10	—		31	10
Club Liégeois	1987–88	Belgian First Division	31	11	—		31	11
Club Liégeois	1988–89	Belgian First Division	31	22	5	3	36	25
Club Liégeois	1989–90	Belgian First Division	28	8	6	1	34	9
Club Liégeois	1990–91	Belgian First Division	7	3	1	0	8	3
Club Liégeois	1991–92	Belgian First Division	28	10	—		28	10
Club Liégeois	1992–93	Belgian First Division	13	1	—		13	1
Club Liégeois	Total		169	65	12	4	181	69
Seraing	1993–94	Belgian First Division	24	2	—		24	2
Club Liégeois	1994–95	Belgian First Division	28	13	—		28	13
Tilleur-Liégeois	1995–96	Belgian Third Division			—			
Tilleur-Liégeois	1996–97	Belgian Second Division			—			
Tilleur-Liégeois	Total				—			
Career total			421	138	22	5	443	143

== Honours ==
Partizan

- Yugoslav First League: 1982–83, 1985–86
- Mitropa Cup: 1977–78

Club Liégeois

- Belgian Cup: 1989–90
