= Dragi Kaličanin =

Serbian footballer and manager

Personal information
- Full name: Dragi Kaličanin
- Date of birth: 28 October 1957 (age 69)
- Place of birth: Sjenica, FPR Yugoslavia
- Position: Defender

Senior career*
Years	Team	Apps	(Gls)
1976–1980	Borac Čačak	71	(9)
1980–1985	Partizan	87	(7)
1985–1986	Real Zaragoza	23	(2)
1986–1987	Bursaspor	15	(1)
1987–1988	Priština	3	(0)
1988–1989	Borac Čačak	15	(4)
Total		214	(23)

Managerial career
- 1999: Partizan (assistant)
- 1999–2000: Omladinac Banja Luka
- 2008–2009: Voždovac
- * Club domestic league appearances and goals

Dragi Kaličanin (Serbian Cyrillic: Драги Каличанин; born 28 October 1957) is a Serbian football manager and former player.

== Background and career ==
Born in Štavalj, Sjenica, in modern-day Serbia, he started and finished his playing career with FK Borac Čačak but his best years were spent while playing with Yugoslav First League giants FK Partizan and with Spanish La Liga club Real Zaragoza with whom he won the 1986 Copa del Rey. He also had short spells in Turkey and with another Yugoslav club, FK Priština.

== Honours ==
Partizan

- Yugoslav First League: 1982-83

Zaragoza

- Copa del Rey: 1986
