= Zvonko Živković =

Serbian footballer

Personal information
- Date of birth: 31 October 1959 (age 66)
- Place of birth: Belgrade, FPR Yugoslavia
- Height: 1.77 m (5 ft 10 in)
- Position: Striker

Youth career
- 1973–1977: Galenika Zemun
- 1977–1978: Partizan

Senior career*
Years	Team	Apps	(Gls)
1978–1986	Partizan	187	(59)
1986–1987	Benfica	8	(0)
1987–1988	Fortuna Düsseldorf	20	(4)
1988–1991	Dijon	79	(17)
Total		294	(80)

International career
1979	Yugoslavia U20	3	(0)
1982–1985	Yugoslavia	5	(2)

Managerial career
- 2004–2005: Serbia and Montenegro U19
- 2006–2007: Serbia U19
- 2010: Metalac Gornji Milanovac
- 2012: Partizan (assistant)
- 2013: Teleoptik
- 2021: Serbia U21
- * Club domestic league appearances and goals

Zvonko Živković (Serbian Cyrillic: Звонко Живковић; born 31 October 1959) is a Serbian football manager and former player.

== Playing career ==
Živković spent eight seasons at Partizan, before moving to Benfica in 1986. He also played for Fortuna Düsseldorf and Dijon, before retiring in 1991.

Živković made five appearances for the Yugoslavia national team and scored two goals. He was also a member of the team at the 1982 FIFA World Cup.

== Coaching career ==
Živković was the head coach of the Serbia and Montenegro national under-19 team from 2004 to 2005. With him, they reached the semifinals of the 2005 UEFA European Under-19 Championship. Živković also led the Serbian national under-19 team to the 2007 UEFA European Under-19 Championship.

== Career statistics ==
List of international goals scored by Zvonko Živković
No.	Date	Venue	Opponent	Score	Result	Competition
1	15 December 1982	Titograd, Yugoslavia	Wales	2–1	4–4	UEFA Euro 1984 qualifying
2	29 January 1985	Kochi, India	China	1–0	1–1	Friendly

== Honours ==
Partizan

- Yugoslav First League: 1982–83, 1985–86
