= Zoran Dimitrijević =

Serbian footballer

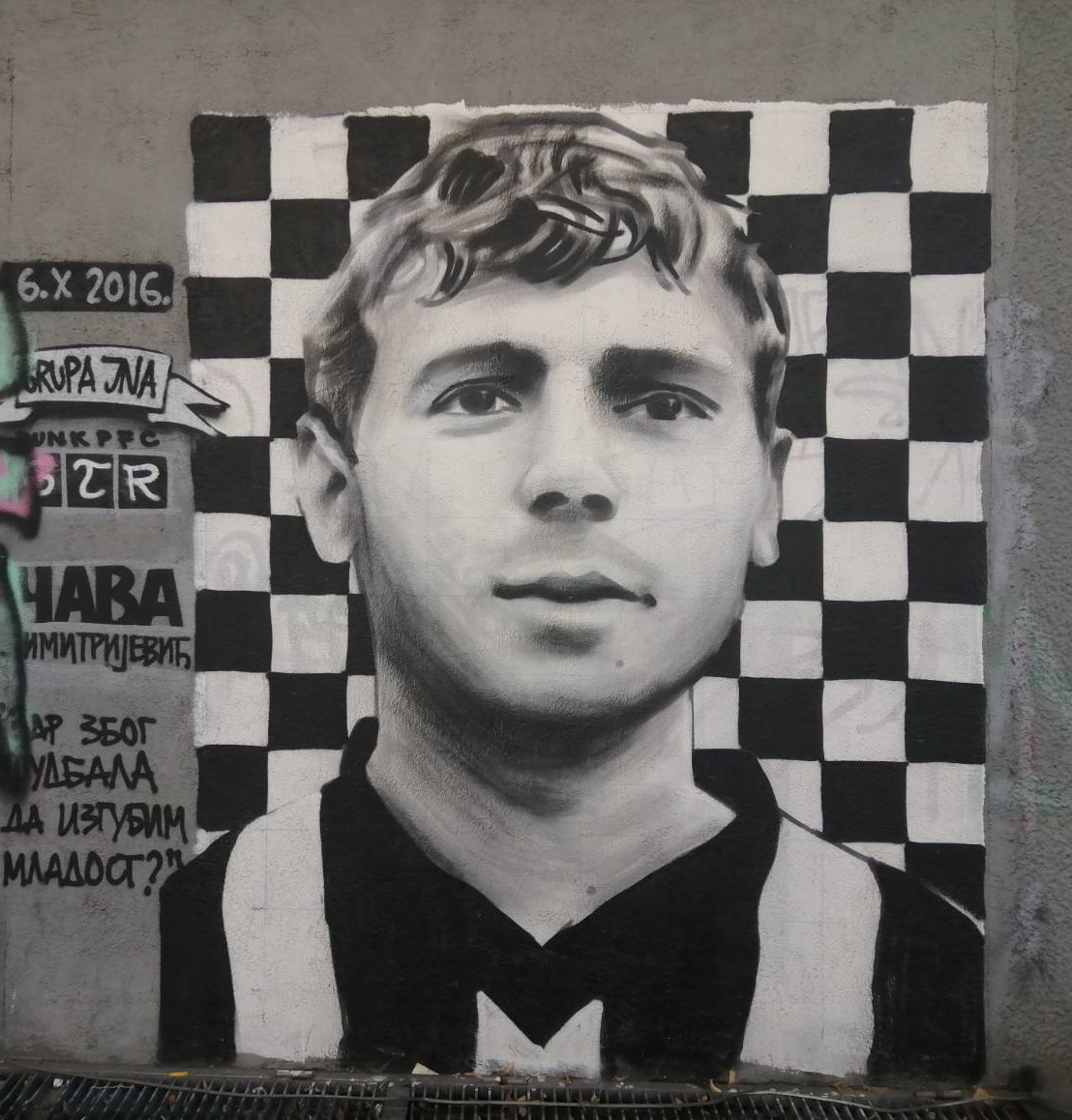
- Mural dedicated to Dimitrijević in Vračar

Personal information
- Full name: Zoran Dimitrijević
- Date of birth: 28 August 1962
- Place of birth: Belgrade, PR Serbia, FPR Yugoslavia
- Date of death: 13 September 2006 (aged 44)
- Place of death: Nantes, France
- Height: 1.78 m (5 ft 10 in)
- Position: Midfielder

Youth career
- 1975–1981: Partizan

Senior career*
Years	Team	Apps	(Gls)
1981–1985	Partizan	61	(5)
1985	Kansas City Comets (indoor)	8	(0)
1986–1987	Spartak Subotica	13	(4)
1987–1989	Dinamo Zagreb	37	(2)
1989–1991	Dijon	45	(3)
1991–1992	Valence		
1992–1996	ESA Brive		
Total		164	(14)

International career
1982–1985	Yugoslavia U21	6	(2)
- * Club domestic league appearances and goals

Zoran "Čava" Dimitrijević (Serbian Cyrillic: Зоран "Чава" Димитријевић; 28 August 1962 – 13 September 2006) was a Serbian professional footballer who played as a midfielder.

== Career ==
Born in Belgrade, Dimitrijević started out at Partizan and made his first team debut in 1981 against Velež Mostar. He spent four seasons in the senior squad, winning one Yugoslav First League title with the Crno-beli. He totalled 59 goals in 199 matches for the club in all competitions, but never lived up to the expectations due to his love for night-life and alcohol. After leaving the club in 1985, Dimitrijević moved to the United States and briefly played indoor soccer with the Kansas City Comets. He subsequently returned to Yugoslavia and went on to play for Spartak Subotica and Dinamo Zagreb. In his later years, Dimitrijević played for several French clubs.

== Personal life ==
He was the father of Miloš Dimitrijević. He survived a road accident in France in 1993. Dimitrijević died in 2006.

== Honours ==
Partizan

- Yugoslav First League: 1982–83

Spartak Subotica

- Yugoslav Second League: 1985–86
