= February Tournament =

FK Velež – 14. februar
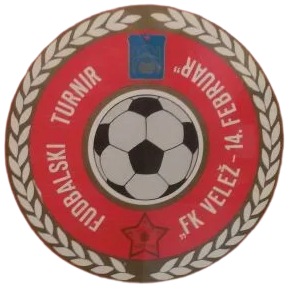
- Variant of the tournament's logo, used from the mid-1970s onwards
- Founded: 1965–1992 (original); 2023 (revival)
- Teams: 4
- Current champions: Velež Mostar (18th title) (Note: Velež's senior team won 15 titles, while their U-19 side won 3 titles.)
- Most championships: Velež Mostar (18 titles)

The February Tournament (Bosnian-Herzegovinian: Februarski turnir/Фебруарски турнир) is a preseason invitational tournament organized by the city of Mostar and the Velež Mostar football club that was held every year between 1965 and 1992, with a new edition starting in 2023. Although its official name was the Football Tournament in Mostar (Fudbalski turnir u Mostaru/Фудбалски турнир у Мостару), it quickly became known as the February Tournament and less frequently Velež's Tournament due to the fact that it was organized by Velež and always held in February for symbolic reasons. After reviving the tournament in 2023, the new official name was the Traditional Football Tournament: "FK Velež – February 14" (Tradicionalni fudbalski turnir: "FK Velež – 14. februar").

Yugoslavia's football league system at the time, like most other Eastern European nations allowed for a longer break between the first half of the season (held in the fall) and the second (held in the spring), with the February Tournament being held roughly before the start of the second half of the season. It was also the oldest invitational tournament in Yugoslavia, with other notable tournaments such as the Trofej Marjana in Split (first held in 1974) and a tournament in Titograd (first held in 1971) coming later. These factors turned it into of the most prestigious pre-season tournaments in Yugoslavia, with the most successful clubs from the country regularly making appearances, as well as various foreign teams on occasion.

28 editions of the tournaments were held, but only 26 with a definite winner at the end. In 1966, instead of a tournament 5 various teams played exhibition matches, and in 1979 the tournament was cancelled midway through because Edvard Kardelj, one of Yugoslavia's leading politicians at the time, died due to colon cancer. Velež Mostar were the most victorious side in the tournament, going on to win it 15 times. The second most successful teams were FK Partizan Belgrade and FK Željezničar Sarajevo, winning three times each. Five other teams won once each. Dušan Bajević holds the record of both making the most appearances, as well as the most goals scored in the tournament's history.

The tournament in its original state was last held in 1992, after which the Bosnian War started, and as a result Velež was no longer able to play on the Bijeli Brijeg stadium which had hosted every edition up until that point. There were multiple attempts to revive the tournament, however they were rendered impossible due to financial and technical aspects the club was facing decades after the war. Despite this, in 2023, the club officially brought the tournament back with U-19 youth teams, with hopes to return to senior teams as soon as possible.

== History ==
February 14, 1945, is the day the city of Mostar was liberated by Yugoslav partisans from Nazi occupation in World War II, as such it has tremendous significance as one of the most significant dates in the city's history. While no longer commemorated by the city proper due to changing political climates, it remains honoured by external organizations, including those close to Velež. In 1965, the city government planned a host of activities to celebrate the 20th anniversary of the liberation, the most notable being the opening of the Partisan Memorial Cemetery in September, and the hosting of a football tournament between four teams on the 13th and 14th of February. With only the next tournament being the exception, a precedent was set following the inaugural edition that would last throughout the tournament's entire run. The first day consisted of an opening ceremony with all four teams present, followed by the semifinal games. The second day saw a third-place match first, then the final match, followed by an awards ceremony for the winners, the best player and the top goalscorer.

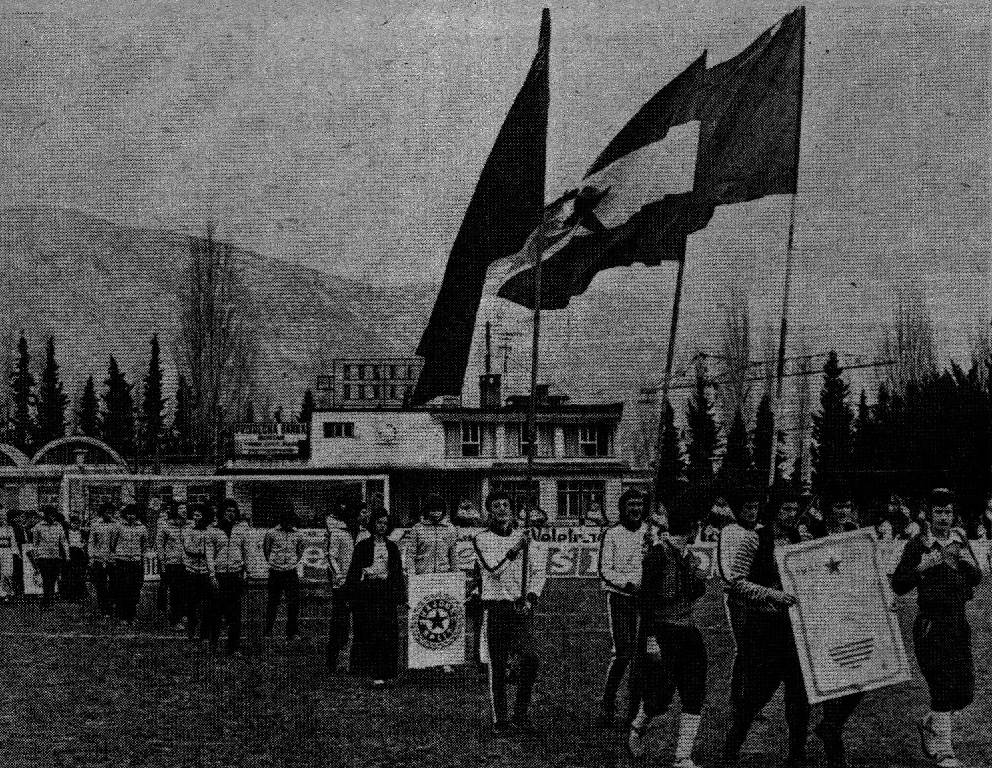
Opening ceremony of the 1975 tournament

Velež won the inaugural edition by beating Hajduk Split 1-0. Muhamed Mujić scored the winning goal in the 65th minute with a shot 20 meters away from the goal after an assist from Ivan Popović, a goal which would be the first of Velež's 16 titles in the tournament, decidedly the most out of any team. In 1966 the format was changed to only include exhibition matches, of which Velež only played two matches, a 2-1 win against Radnički Niš and a 3-1 loss against FK Partizan. Partizan would later go on to be the second club to win the tournament, and the first to do it on penalties in 1968. That edition was peculiar for being the first February Tournament to include a foreign team, more specifically the Hungarian side Diósgyőri, then a midtable side in the Hungarian top-flight. In total, 14 tournaments with at least foreign team participating were held, some containing two such teams. Almost all foreign teams were from Europe, and most of them were from the Eastern Bloc.

The first foreign team to reach the final was Slavia Prague from Czechoslovakia in 1969, who competed in the Inter-Cities Fairs Cup that season, a precursor to the UEFA Cup, and later the Europa League. They defeated holders Partizan on penalties and advanced to the finals, where they lost 2-0 to Velež, with goals from Mehmed Karamehmedović and a penalty kick by Dušan Bajević. The first foreign team to win the competition was not a club team like those that preceded them, but a national team instead. The national team of the Soviet Union featured crucial international players like midfielder Leonid Buryak and 1975 Ballon d'Or winner Oleg Blokhin at the 1976 February Tournament, who qualified for the quarterfinals of the 1976 Euros the previous year and would go on to win third place at the Olympic tournament in football that summer. They defeated Crvena zvezda (Red Star Belgrade) 2-1 in the semifinals, and won the penalty shootout in the final match against Dinamo Zagreb, two of the "Big Four" sides of Yugoslavian football at the time. The next year Poland's national team played at the February Tournament, with their success at the 1974 World Cup still a recent memory. Their greatest players of that generation, Władysław Żmuda, Henryk Kasperczak and Grzegorz Lato all participated in the tournament, but lost 3-0 in the final game to Velež, who were also fielding one of their best generations of all time. Poland and the Soviet Union remained the only national teams to compete in the February Tournament, and all foreign teams from now on would be club teams.

"This will be my first time coming to the tournament in Mostar, of which I have heard so many nice things about. This year the tournament should be very good. All the contestants are at the top of Yugoslav football. With competition like that, winning first place should be considered a great success."

— Josip Skoblar, manager for Hajduk Split ahead of the 1987 tournament

Tâj Teheran (later renamed Esteghlal after the Iranian Revolution) became the only non-European team to participate in the tournament in 1978, as the Asian continental champions from Iran finished in fourth place. In 1979, the tournament was cancelled halfway through due to the death of communist politician Edvard Kardelj. A three day national state of mourning was declared, and one of those days was the planned final day of the tournament (11 February). The two semifinal games were already played the day prior: Crvena zvezda defeated Velež on penalties with a score of 4-3 (0-0 after regular time), and Dinamo Zagreb defeated one of the greatest East German sides of the time 1. FC Magdeburg 2-1. The 1980 tournament is probably the most famous edition of the February Tournament due to a game that has gone down in history as Dinamo Zagreb's worst ever defeat. Velež defeated the Blues from Zagreb 9-2 in the semifinal match that has produced countless urban legends. Blaž Slišković allegedly bet the referee of the match 100 DM that he could score a direct free kick from a tricky angle. The referee turned him down, and watched as Slišković made good on his word and scored his third goal of the game (he ended the game with four goals). Another urban legend after the game claims that Dinamo players justified the high loss by saying they spent the entire night before the game at the pub, to which Slišković replied: "Where did you think we were? The theatre?". Slišković scored the only goal against in the final against Partizan, and was awarded the award for the best player of the tournament. The 1982 tournament was the only time the February Tournament was not played in the month of February. The Yugoslav FA decided to have a shorter break in the 1981-82 season to have more time to prepare for the World Cup in Spain that year, and the tournament was instead played on 30 and 31 January 1982. Also in that tournament, Safet Sušić, one of FK Sarajevo's greatest players, made two appearances for Velež. He had come back after serving his mandatory six months in the Yugoslav People's Army and scored three goals in the tournament, for which he received the award for the player of the tournament. The first team from a non-communist European country to participate was Austrian side Rapid Wien, they also won the tournament in their only appearance in 1985. Sloboda, a local newspaper from Mostar reported in late 1986 that West German Bundesliga side Schalke 04 were supposed to participate in next year's tournaments, but they did not appear. As a matter of fact no foreign teams appeared in the 1987 edition of the February Tournament.

1990 was another unique edition, it featured the Swiss side FC Luzern, for whom former Velež captain Semir Tuce was playing for at the time, but did not play for either Luzern or Velež in the tournament. He was instead in a team composed of those who were serving in the Yugoslav People's Army at the time alongside players like Igor Štimac and Draženko Prskalo. The 1991 edition was the last to include teams outside Bosnia and Herzegovina, and featured Velež's heaviest loss in the history of the February Tournament, 6-1 at the hands of Crvena zvezda. They rallied to win the third place match 4-0 against Željezničar, while Zvezda defeated Dinamo 1-0 in the final thanks to a goal from Vladimir Jugović in the 14th minute. Velež won the final tournament in 1992 against debutants Borac Banja Luka by a score of 4-1, and clinched their 15th title. After the conclusion of the 1992 February tournament, Bosnia and Herzegovina voted to declare independence from Yugoslavia the following month, and later, war had broken out in the country. Velež could no longer use the Bijeli Brijeg stadium, and the situation in the country rendered playing football impossible. Even after the conclusion of the war, Velež were in no position to host such a demanding event. Changing calendars in the football season meant that few countries had a winter break long enough to travel to a tournament held in February. Velež were also beset with problems of their own, their new stadium Stadion Rođeni did not have the same level of infrastructure as the Bijeli Brijeg stadium and had to be built from the ground up. Velež were also in a transitional period with lots of boards who were not financially stable on their own to host such an event.

In a 2023 press conference featuring Velež president Senad Kevelj, head of the youth setup Anel Karabeg and U-19 coach Amel Jazvin announced that the February Tournament would be revived. The tournament would take place on only one day (February 11), feature U-19 youth teams and be played on the club's training ground instead. Jazvin, who was cited by the others as the driving force behind reviving the tournament, said the following: "I am disappointed that it won't be a senior tournament right away, but the fact that the junior [U-19] teams will play instead does not take away anything from the actual tournament.". Velež won the revived tournament in the end, after winning 4-1 against FK Željezničar.

== Results ==
=== List of tournaments ===
Year	Final			Third-place play-off		
Year	(gold) Winner	Score	(silver) Runner-up	(bronze) Third	Score	Fourth
1965	Velež Mostar	1-0	Hajduk Split	Budućnost Titograd	2-1	Sloboda Tuzla
1966	No winner, 5 teams played exhibition matches					
1967	Velež Mostar	3-2	Partizan Belgrade	Sloboda Tuzla	1-1 (Note: The third-place match ended 1-1 in regular time. There were no penalties afterwards. Former club secretary Ismet Dervišević retrospectively placed Sutjeska in 4th in his 1997 almanac, and Velež concurred when reviving the tournament in 2023.)	Sutjeska Nikšić
1968	Partizan Belgrade	0-0 (4-0p)	Velež Mostar	Željezničar Sarajevo	3-1	(Hungary) Diósgyőri VTK
1969	Velež Mostar	2-0	(Czechoslovakia) Slavia Prague	Vojvodina Novi Sad	2-2 (Note: The third-place match ended 2-2 in regular time. There were no penalties afterwards. Former club secretary Ismet Dervišević retrospectively placed Partizan in 4th in his 1997 almanac.)	Partizan Belgrade
1970	Željezničar Sarajevo	2-1	Velež Mostar	Vojvodina Novi Sad	2-2 (Note: After the game ended 2-2, Vojvodina's players remained on the pitch waiting for a penalty shootout, while the Honvéd players went into the dressing room.)	(Hungary) Budapest Honvéd
1971	Velež Mostar	3-1	Željezničar Sarajevo	FK Sarajevo	2-0	Olimpija Ljubljana
1972	Velež Mostar	3-0	Red Star Belgrade	Vojvodina Novi Sad	2-2 (6-5p)	Željezničar Sarajevo
1973	Velež Mostar	2-1	Željezničar Sarajevo	Hajduk Split	2-2 (3-2p)	(Hungary) MTK Budapest
1974	Velež Mostar	4-1	Radnički Niš	Željezničar Sarajevo	4-1	(Romania) SC Bacău
1975	Velež Mostar	1-0	Hajduk Split	FK Sarajevo	1-0	Čelik Zenica
1976	Soviet Union	0-0 (4-3p)	Dinamo Zagreb	Red Star Belgrade	2-1	Velež Mostar
1977	Velež Mostar	3-0	Poland	(Hungary) Újpest Dosza	8-1	FK Sarajevo
1978	Dinamo Zagreb	1-1 (5-3p)	Velež Mostar	(Soviet Union) Lokomotiv Moscow	3-0	(Iran) Tâj Teheran
1979	Tournament cancelled because of the death of Edvard Kardelj					
1980	Velež Mostar	1-0	Partizan Belgrade	Dinamo Zagreb	1-0	FK Sarajevo
1981	Velež Mostar	2-1	(Soviet Union) Dinamo Tbilisi	Partizan Belgrade	0-0 (3-2p)	Budućnost Titograd
1982	Partizan Belgrade	3-1	Red Star Belgrade	Velež Mostar	3-2	Dinamo Zagreb
1983	Željezničar Sarajevo	2-0	Red Star Belgrade	Velež Mostar	2-1	Partizan Belgrade
1984	Željezničar Sarajevo	1-1 (5-4p)	Velež Mostar	Red Star Belgrade	2-0	Dinamo Zagreb
1985	(Austria) Rapid Wien	1-1 (3-2p)	Željezničar Sarajevo	Velež Mostar	2-0	Hajduk Split
1986	Velež Mostar	3-2	FK Sarajevo	Partizan Belgrade	2-2 (6-5p)	(Hungary) Budapest Honvéd
1987	Partizan Belgrade	1-1 (5-4p)	Velež Mostar	Hajduk Split	2-2 (4-2p)	Budućnost Titograd
1988	Velež Mostar	2-1	Partizan Belgrade	(Austria) Sturm Graz	0-0 (4-1p)	(Hungary) Vasas SC
1989	Hajduk Split	0-0 (3-2p)	Velež Mostar	Partizan Belgrade	0-0 (6-5p)	(Austria) Sturm Graz
1990	Velež Mostar	2-1	Partizan Belgrade	(Switzerland) FC Luzern	2-2 (6-5 p)	JNA
1991	Red Star Belgrade	1-0	Dinamo Zagreb	Velež Mostar	4-0	Željezničar Sarajevo
1992	Velež Mostar	4-1	Borac Banja Luka	FK Sarajevo	3-1	Sloboda Tuzla
2023	Velež Mostar	4-1	Željezničar Sarajevo	(Montenegro) Sutjeska Nikšić	2-2 (4-3p)	FK Sarajevo
2024	Velež Mostar	4-2	Igman Konjic	(Montenegro) Budućnost Podgorica	1-0	(Croatia) HNK Šibenik
2025	FK Sarajevo	4-3	Velež Mostar	Igman Ilidža	4-0	Igman Konjic
2026	Velež Mostar	6-0	Bosna Visoko	Budućnost Banovići	2-0	Iskra Bugojno

=== List of winners ===
Club	Winner	Runner-up	Tournaments won
Velež Mostar	15 (18)	6 (1)	1965, 1967, 1969, 1971, 1972, 1973, 1974, 1975, 1977, 1980, 1981, 1986, 1988, 1990, 1992, 2023, 2024, 2026
Partizan Belgrade	3	4	1968, 1982, 1987
Željezničar Sarajevo	3	3 (4)	1970, 1983, 1984
Red Star Belgrade	1	3	1991
Hajduk Split	1	2	1989
Dinamo Zagreb	1	2	1978
(Austria) Rapid Wien	1	0	1985
Soviet Union	1	0	1976
FK Sarajevo	0 (1)	1	2025

=== Appearances by club ===
For the original editions of the tournament, teams from Yugoslavia are marked with the flags of their respective republics at the time. Teams that have competed in both the original and revived editions have both the flag of their republic, as well as their flag as an independent state. Teams that won the tournament that year are marked in bold, and youth teams in a given year are marked in italic.

Club	Appearances	Tournaments present
Teams from former Yugoslavia
(Socialist Republic of Bosnia and Herzegovina) (Bosnia and Herzegovina) Velež Mostar	32	**1965**, 1966, **1967**, 1968, **1969**, 1970, **1971**, **1972**, **1973**, **1974**, **1975**, 1976, **1977**, 1978, 1979, **1980**, **1981**, 1982, 1983, 1984, 1985, **1986**, 1987, **1988**, 1989, **1990**, 1991, **1992**, **2023**, **2024**, 2025, **2026**
(Socialist Republic of Serbia) Partizan Belgrade	13	1966, 1967, **1968**, 1969, 1980, 1981, **1982**, 1983, 1986, **1987**, 1988, 1989, 1990
(Socialist Republic of Bosnia and Herzegovina) (Bosnia and Herzegovina) Željezničar Sarajevo	12	1966, 1968, **1970**, 1971, 1972, 1973, 1974, **1983**, **1984**, 1985, 1991, 2023
(Socialist Republic of Bosnia and Herzegovina) (Bosnia and Herzegovina) FK Sarajevo	8	1971, 1975, 1977, 1980, 1986, 1992, 2023, **2025**
(Socialist Republic of Serbia) Red Star Belgrade	7	1972, 1976, 1979, 1982, 1983, 1984, **1991**
(Socialist Republic of Croatia) Dinamo Zagreb	7	1976, **1978**, 1979, 1980, 1982, 1984, 1991
(Socialist Republic of Croatia) Hajduk Split	6	1965, 1973, 1975, 1985, 1987, **1989**
(Socialist Republic of Montenegro) (Montenegro) Budućnost Podgorica	4	1965, 1981, 1987, 2024
(Socialist Republic of Bosnia and Herzegovina) Sloboda Tuzla	3	1965, 1967, 1992
(Socialist Republic of Serbia) Vojvodina Novi Sad	3	1969, 1970, 1972
(Bosnia and Herzegovina) Igman Konjic	2	2024, 2025
(Socialist Republic of Montenegro) (Montenegro) Sutjeska Nikšić	2	1967, 2023
(Socialist Republic of Bosnia and Herzegovina) Čelik Zenica	2	1966, 1975
(Socialist Republic of Serbia) Radnički Niš	2	1966, 1974
(Bosnia and Herzegovina) Bosna Visoko	1	2026
(Bosnia and Herzegovina) Budućnost Banovići	1	2026
(Bosnia and Herzegovina) Iskra Bugojno	1	2026
(Bosnia and Herzegovina) Igman Ilidža	1	2025
(Croatia) HNK Šibenik	1	2024
(Socialist Republic of Bosnia and Herzegovina) Borac Banja Luka	1	1992
(Socialist Republic of Slovenia) Olimpija Ljubljana	1	1971
Foreign club teams
(Austria) Sturm Graz	2	1988, 1989
(Hungary) Budapest Honvéd	2	1970, 1986
(Switzerland) FC Luzern	1	1990
(Hungary) Vasas SC	1	1989
(Austria) Rapid Wien	1	**1985**
(Soviet Union) Dinamo Tbilisi	1	1981
(East Germany) 1. FC Magdeburg	1	1979
(Soviet Union) Lokomotiv Moscow	1	1978
(Iran) Tâj Teheran	1	1978
(Hungary) Újpest Dosza	1	1977
(Romania) SC Bacău	1	1974
(Hungary) MTK Budapest	1	1973
(Czechoslovakia) Slavia Prague	1	1969
(Hungary) Diósgyőri VTK	1	1968
Foreign national teams
Poland	1	1977
Soviet Union	1	**1976**
Other teams
JNA	1	1990

== Legacy ==
Besides the sporting activities that took place on the pitch, the February Tournament was infamous for the massive outpouring of rain that was common in almost all tournaments. This would severely weaken the quality of the pitch, but would become an enduring part of the folklore surrounding the tournament in both the run-up to the event, and nostalgic memories decades past.

The first attempt to revive the February Tournament came in 2008, when a planned edition in 2009 would have featured Velež, FK Sarajevo, Partizan Belgrade and an unnamed fourth team from Croatia. The club sought help from the mayor of Mostar at the time, Ljubo Bešlić, to help organize the tournament, however the mayor did not respond. Fans of Velež, known as Red Army Mostar, have organized a futsal tournament between them called the February Tournament on every year since 2013, which has been sanctioned by Velež proper. In 2016, the first edition of the "February Festival" (Februarski festival) was organized by non-profit organization UG Mostarski Rođeni, where old pictures, newspaper articles and posters were displayed detailing the history of the tournament. The most recent edition of the event was held in 2019, with the trophy Velež won in the 1980–81 Yugoslav Cup prominently displayed, previously thought to be lost forever.
