= List of Konyaspor managers =

This is a list of all managers of Konyaspor, including honours.

== Managers ==
Nat.	Name	From	To	Notes	Ref
Nat.	Name	From	To	~~"1922–65"~~	Ref
~~"1965–69"~~
(Turkey)	Fahrettin Cansever	1969	1970		
~~"1970–74"~~
(Turkey)	Fahrettin Cansever	1974	1975		
~~"1975–80"~~
(Turkey)	Kazım Admış	1980	1981		
~~"1981–84"~~
(Turkey)	Zeynel Soyuer	1984			
(Turkey)	Arda Vural	1984	1985		
(Turkey)	Coşkun Süer	1985			
(Turkey)	Kadri Aytaç	1986			
(Turkey)	Nevzat Güzelırmak	1986	1987		
(Turkey)	Özkan Sümer	1987	1988	1 TFF First League champions	
(Turkey)	Erol Togay	1988	1989		
(Turkey)	Şener Dal	1988	1989		
(Turkey)	Ömer Duran	1989		Caretaker manager	
(Turkey)	Arif Çetinkaya	1989			
(Socialist Federal Republic of Yugoslavia)	Zoran Čolaković	1989	1990		
(Turkey)	Tezcan Uzcan	1990			
(Turkey)	Ömer Duran	1990	1991		
(Turkey)	Ömer Zengin	1991			
(Turkey)	Ömer Duran	1991	1992		
(Poland)	Franciszek Smuda	1992			
(Turkey)	Arif Çetinkaya	1992		Caretaker manager	
(Turkey)	Murat Özgen	1992			
(Socialist Federal Republic of Yugoslavia)	Hüsnü Macuni	1992		Caretaker manager	
(Turkey)	Ömer Zengin	1992	1993		
(Turkey)	Arif Çetinkaya	1993		Caretaker manager	
(Turkey)	Naci Renklibay	1993		Caretaker manager	
(Turkey)	Aldoğan Argo	1993			
(Turkey)	Gündüz Tekin Onay	1994			
(Turkey)	Müjdat Yalman	1994			
(Turkey)	Erkan Kural	1994	1995		
(Turkey)	İsmet Arıkan	1995	1996		
~~"1996–97"~~
(Turkey)	Ali Hoşfikirer	1997			
(Turkey)	Ahmet Akçan	1997			
(Turkey)	Kemal Kılıç	1997	1998		
(Turkey)	Sadi Tekelioğlu	1998			
(Turkey)	Yılmaz Vural	1998	1999		
(Turkey)	Kemal Kılıç	1999			
(Turkey)	Giray Bulak	1999	2000		
(Turkey)	Rıdvan Dilmen	2000			
(Bosnia and Herzegovina)	Nenad Bijedić	2000			
(Turkey)	Mustafa Çapanoğlu	2000	2001		
(Turkey)	Ziya Doğan	2001			
(Turkey)	Mustafa Çapanoğlu	2001	2002		
(Turkey)	Hüsnü Özkara	2002	2003	1 TFF First League champions	
(Turkey)	Mehmet Yıldırım	2003	2004	Caretaker manager	
(Turkey)	Tevfik Lav	2004			
(Turkey)	Kemal Özdeş	2004		Caretaker manager	
(Turkey)	Sakıp Özberk	2004			
(Turkey)	Hamza Hamzaoğlu	2004		Caretaker manager	
(Bosnia and Herzegovina)	Safet Sušić	2004	2005		
(Turkey)	Aykut Kocaman	2005	2006		
(Turkey)	Nurullah Sağlam	2006	2007		
(Turkey)	Ünal Karaman	2007	2008		
(Turkey)	Raşit Çetiner	2008			
(Turkey)	Nevzat Dinçbudak	2008		Caretaker manager	
(Turkey)	Giray Bulak	2008	2009		
(Turkey)	Ünal Karaman	2009		Caretaker manager	
(Turkey)	Hüsnü Özkara	2009	2010		
(Turkey)	Fuat Yaman	2010			
(Turkey)	Ziya Doğan	2010	2011		
(Turkey)	Yılmaz Vural	2011			
(Turkey)	Osman Özdemir	2011	2012		
(Turkey)	Hüsnü Özkara	2012			
(Turkey)	Muharrem Aydın	2012		Caretaker manager	
(Turkey)	Uğur Tütüneker	2012	2013		
(Turkey)	Mesut Bakkal	2013	2014		
(Turkey)	Aykut Kocaman	2014	2017	1 Turkish Cup champions	
(Turkey)	Mustafa Reşit Akçay	2017	2017	1 Turkish Super Cup champions	
(Turkey)	Mehmet Özdilek	2017	2018	Appointed in October 2017.	
(Turkey)	Sergen Yalçın	2018	2018	Appointed in March 2018.	
(Turkey)	Rıza Çalımbay	2018	2018	Appointed in June 2018.	
(Turkey)	Aykut Kocaman	2018	2020	Returned to Konyaspor.	
(Turkey)	Bülent Korkmaz	2020	2020	Short tenure in 2020.	
(Turkey)	İsmail Kartal	2020	2021	Appointed in September 2020.	
(Turkey)	İlhan Palut	2021	2023	Achieved a 3rd-place finish in the league.	
(Serbia)	Aleksandar Stanojević	2023	2023	Appointed in January 2023.	
(Turkey)	Hakan Keleş	2023	2024	Short tenure with the club.	
(Bosnia and Herzegovina)	Fahrudin Omerović	2024	2024	Brief period as manager in 2024.	
(Turkey)	Ali Çamdalı	2024	2024	Former player appointed as manager.	
(Turkey)	Recep Uçar	2024	Present	Current manager of Konyaspor.	

== Records ==
=== Nationalities ===
Country	Managers	Trophies
(Turkey)	56	2
(Socialist Federal Republic of Yugoslavia) (Serbia)	3	0
(Bosnia and Herzegovina)	3	0
(Poland)	1	0

=== Most games managed ===
Name	Nat.	Games
Aykut Kocaman	(Turkey)	175
İlhan Palut	(Turkey)	81
Hüsnü Özkara	(Turkey)	53
Uğur Tütüneker	(Turkey)	43
Osman Özdemir	(Turkey)	37
Ziya Doğan	(Turkey)	34
