= Stadion Rođeni =

Football stadium in Mostar, Bosnia and Herzegovina

Rođeni Stadium
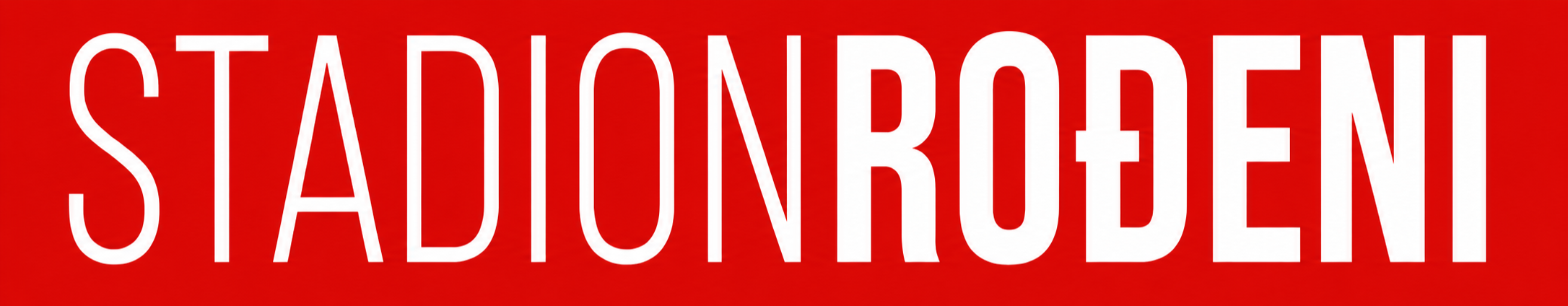

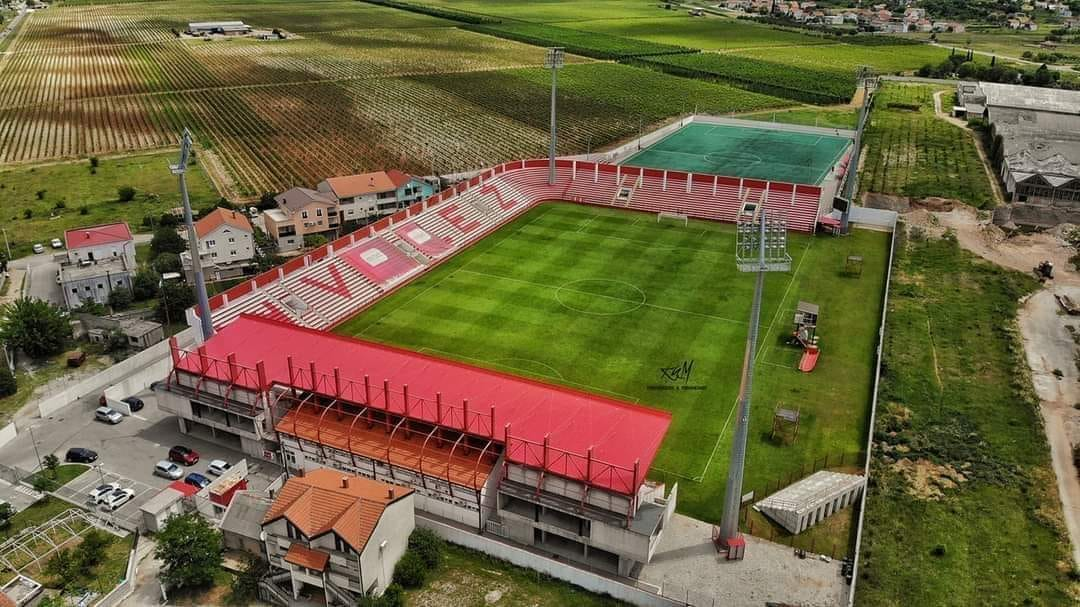
- Aerial view from southwest in June 2021; UEFA
- Interactive map of Rođeni Stadium
- Full name: Stadion Rođeni
- Former names: Stadion Vrapčići (1995–2017)
- Address: Vrapčići bb
- Location: 88113 Vrapčići, Mostar, Bosnia and Herzegovina
- Coordinates: 43°22′42″N 17°51′16″E
- Elevation: 76 metres (249 ft)
- Owner: City of Mostar
- Operator: FK Velež Mostar (40-year concession)
- Seating type: Stadium seating
- Capacity: 7,000
- Type: Stadium
- Event: Sporting events
- Surface: GrassMaster (2022–present)
- Scoreboard: LED 13.8 m^{2} (149 sq ft)
- Field size: 105 m × 68 m (114.8 yd × 74.4 yd)
- Public transit: Mostar Bus; Taxi
- Parking: 700 spaces (in surrounding lots)

Construction
- Built: 1995
- Opened: 25 November 1995 (30 years ago)
- Renovated: 2008
- Expanded: 2006, 2020, 2023–present

Tenants
- FK Velež Mostar (1995–present); ŽF/NK Emina Mostar (2017–present)

Website
- fkvelez.ba/stadion-rodjeni

Stadion Rođeni (English: Rođeni Stadium), previously known as Stadion Vrapčići (English: Vrapčići Stadium), is a football stadium in Mostar, Bosnia and Herzegovina, which has been used by FK Velež Mostar since 1995. It is located in the northeastern part of the city, namely the Vrapčići suburb, and is principal stadium and the home-ground of FK Velež Mostar football club. The stadium takes its name from FK Velež's and its supporters' nickname "Rođeni" (English: "own", as in "our own"; literally "born"), and was decided after an online poll in 2017.

At present stage of development, it can receive up to 7,000 supporters in attendance. The lack of funds and a slow process of country's recovery from the war, as well as complicated political ambient in the city and the country as a whole, all of which have influenced the scope and the tempo of stadium development.

== Stadium operator ==
On the 12th of October 2012, in order to regularize the stadium's legal status, the City Council of Mostar (Gradsko vijeće Grada Mostara) passed a landmark decision granting FK Velež Mostar the rights to utilize the entire stadium complex and its adjacent grounds free of charge for a period of 40 years. This long-term concession replaced a precarious, one-year rolling contract that historically covered only the 8,000 m² playing field. The 40-year lease provided the vital administrative security required to satisfy the Football Federation of Bosnia and Herzegovina and UEFA infrastructure licensing criteria, enabling the club to host European and domestic Premijer liga matches while unlocking international infrastructure funding.

== History ==
=== Stadiums before "Stadion Rođeni" ===
Like all other clubs in Mostar at the time, Velež played their league matches before World War II at a quarter of the city then known as "Bakamovića glava", later known as "Staro Veležovo igralište". After the war Velež became the only major club in the city and the stadium belonged solely to them, although it was owned by the city of Mostar.

The first attempt to build a stadium meant solely for Velež happened at the beginning of 1938. FK Velež's board decided to call a loan among the club's supporters and friends, and all Mostar's working class, whose money would be used to buy land and build a playground. Velež were allegedly the only team in Mostar that had to pay rent to use the "Staro Veležovo igralište", while others played games on it for free. A non-interest-bearing loan, with a two-year repayment period after the construction of the playground, was proposed, and coupons called "Loan" were issued in denominations of 50 and 100 dinars. In this way, 100,000 dinars were collected. When an agreement was reached on the purchase of land, the club was banned by the regime on 3 September 1940, and the money collected was than directed to humanitarian cause "Red Assistance".

After World War II stadium Pod Bijelim Brijegom was built through volunteer labor of young people from Mostar and Bosnia and Herzegovina, between 1947 and 1958. Bijeli Brijeg was a stadium used by FK Velež Mostar from the time it was built until 1992, through the club's glory days, when they emerged triumphant from their campaigns in the 1980–81 and 1985–86 Yugoslav Cups competition, and before that when the club also reached the quarter-final stage of the 1974–75 UEFA Cup. As such the stadium is considered Velež's historic stadium, and plenty calls over the years have been made to return it from various figures, including leading figures at the club at certain points. From time the Bosnian War broke out, and in particular subsequent incitement of Croat-Bosniak hostilities, conflicting ideologies and interests were conveyed from the war times into the post-war era, which continuously manifesting itself through steady political divisiveness in the city of Mostar, among other shown in issues of territorial and ownership disputes. Such political ambiance showed in the forced eviction of FK Velež Mostar from its traditional home-ground of Bijeli Brijeg in 1992, and in subsequent legal disputes over stadium usurpation by another club, emerging in the city at the time.

=== Finding a location and initial opening ===
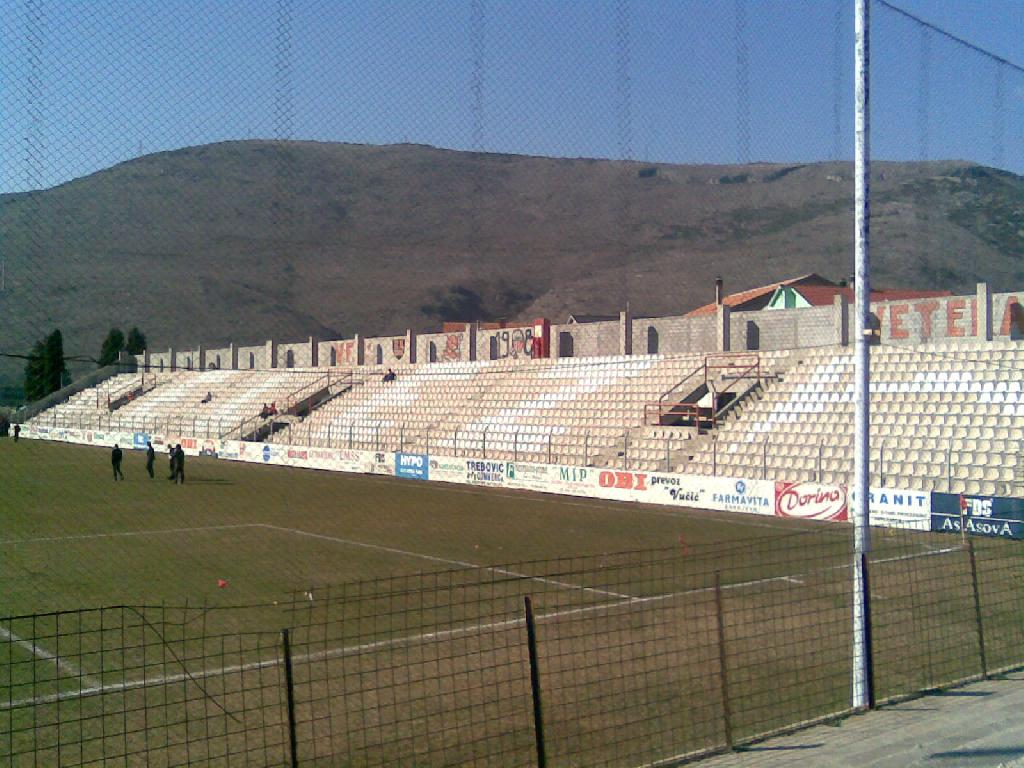
A shot of the northern stand (dedara) taken in 2010, before significant reconstruction

In 1995, Velež played their first home game after the beginning of the war at Sjeverni logor, the former barracks of the Austro-Hungarian and later Yugoslav People's Army. The location was expected to be Velež's temporary home until a return to the Bijeli Brijeg stadium, and in case of that scenario being impossible, was seen as a suitable replacement due to its proximity to the rest of the city, even years later. However, with help from the local government at the time, the Islamic Community built a mosque right next to the field, making a stadium with a larger capacity impracticable. Instead, in 1995 the club was awarded the former field of FK Đuro Salaj, a works team for a company with the same name located in Vrapčići. Before the ground could be re-opened to a larger crowd, Velež played their games for the opening of the 1995–96 First League in Jablanica instead, while their first game in Vrapčići was played on Bosnia and Herzegovina's Statehood Day, 25 November against Željezničar Sarajevo.

The first stand was only built in 1999, specifically the eastern stand, which opened on 14 March that year against Bosna Visoko. The stadium would not receive any new stands for another seven years. When Velež returned to the top flight of Bosnia and Herzegovina football after being promoted in 2006, a large northern stand was constructed in commemoration. In 2012, the eastern stand was renamed the Red Army Tribina (Red Army Stand) after Red Army Mostar, Velež's supporter group. In 2008, a western stand was built, which was dramatically increased in size after additional works and expansions between 2017 and 2018. In 2019, a roof for the western stand was finished.

Bosnia and Herzegovina's under-21 football team has played against Montenegro on two occasions at the stadium, once in 2013 and again in 2016. These are the only international games that have been played at the stadium, although the ongoing construction projects have made the club hopeful of hosting proper international matches in the future.

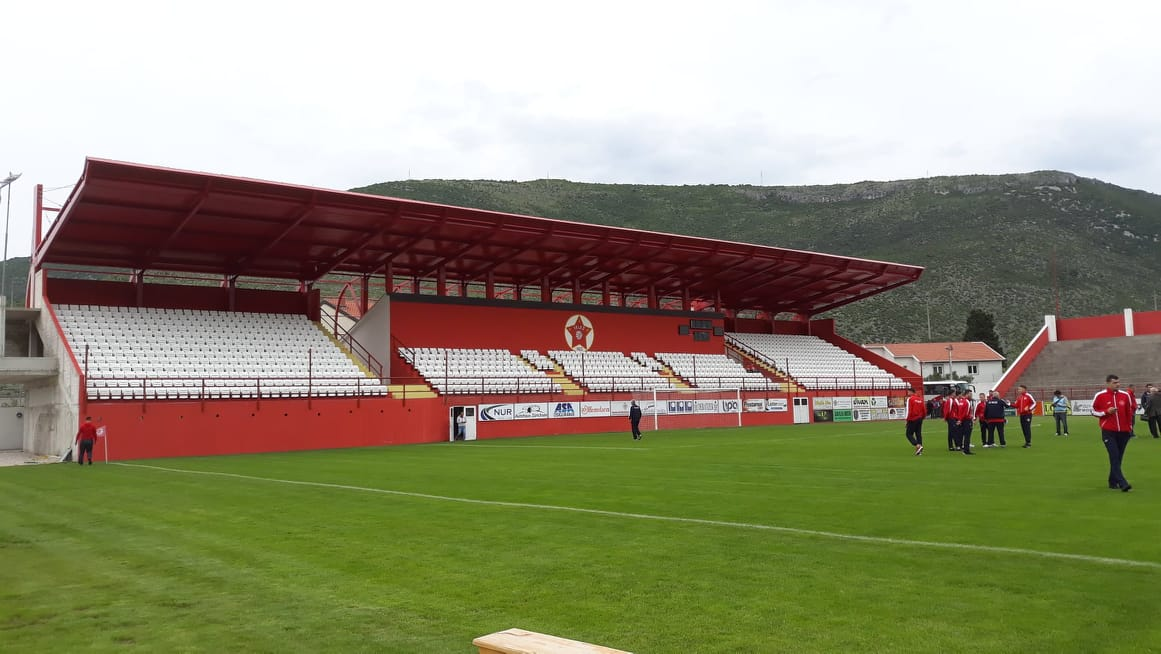
Western stand built in 2018

=== Reconstruction and expansion ===
While hosting a fundraiser for the club, then president of Velež, Šemsudin Hasić announced that within three years (2022 was Velež's 100 year anniversary) the stadium would be upgraded to the point it could be known as the "Rođeni Arena". One month later in December 2019, the eastern stand was demolished for a new stand to be built proportional to the northern stand, known by supporters as the dedara (old man's [stand]).

In 2020, the stadium’s infrastructure was significantly upgraded with the installation of a new floodlight system. The system utilizes Philips ArenaVision (MVF403) metal-halide lamps, each with a power rating of 2000W. The lighting array is calibrated to provide a minimum illuminance of 1,200 lux, meeting UEFA Category 3 requirements for domestic and European competition, with the capacity to reach approximately 1,400 lux for high-definition broadcasting. The first official match played under the floodlights at Rođeni Stadium was on 8 August 2020, when Velež defeated Zrinjski 2–0 in the Mostar derby.

Since the initial announcement the reconstruction has been beset with issues. The COVID-19 pandemic made it much more difficult for work to be done in the stadium, as according to measures at the time only four people could be present at the site at once. Also, due to suspensions and resignations from various members of Velež's board from 2021 onwards, it has been much harder to secure funding for new improvements in the stadium such as the yet unbuilt southern stand, which will host most of the facilities needed for UEFA stadium categorization in the future.

In 2022, Velež signed a contract with the Football Association of Bosnia and Herzegovina to build a new hybrid pitch with finances shared between the club, the FA and UEFA funds that would cost up to 1.200.000 euros. The project involved the installation of a GrassMaster hybrid system, which integrates natural grass with synthetic fibers to enhance pitch durability and stability. Construction started in June of that year and was expected to finish by September, when the club would play a derby match against FK Sarajevo. Since the season would have already began by that point, the club played their home matches in Gabela's Perica "Pero" Pavlović stadium. However, the construction was delayed several times due to the bonding pad structure being incorrectly implemented and other inconveniences while inserting the pitch. As such the club did not play a single home game in the first half of the 2022–23 season at the stadium, playing all their home games in Gabela instead. Work was officially finished in December 2022.

== See also ==
- List of football stadiums in Bosnia and Herzegovina
