= Mili Hadžiabdić =

Bosnian footballer (born 1963)

Personal information
- Date of birth: 25 August 1963 (age 63)
- Place of birth: Mostar, SFR Yugoslavia
- Height: 1.75 m (5 ft 9 in)
- Position: Defender

Senior career*
Years	Team	Apps	(Gls)
1980–1989	Velež Mostar	167	(6)
1990–1991	Hajduk Split	40	(0)
- TuRU Düsseldorf
- * Club domestic league appearances and goals

Mili Hadžiabdić (born 25 August 1963) is a Bosnian former footballer who played as a defender. His brother is Džemal Hadžiabdić. He finished his career in 2007.

== Honours ==
Velež Mostar

- Yugoslav Cup: 1980–81, 1985–86

Hajduk Split

- Yugoslav Cup: 1990–91
