= Avdo Kalajdžić =

Bosnian football manager (born 1959)

Personal information
- Date of birth: 23 May 1959 (age 67)
- Place of birth: Mostar, SFR Yugoslavia
- Position: Defender

Youth career
- –1977: Velež Mostar

Senior career*
Years	Team	Apps	(Gls)
1977–1988	Velež Mostar	224	(11)
1988–1990	Bursaspor	63	(2)
Total		287	(13)

Managerial career
- 1998–2000: Velež Mostar
- 1999: Bosnia and Herzegovina (caretaker)
- 2003: Velež Mostar
- 2016: Velež Mostar
- * Club domestic league appearances and goals

Avdo Kalajdžić (Bosnian pronunciation: [ǎːʋdo kalǎjdʒiːtɕ]; born 23 May 1959) is a Bosnian professional football manager and former player.

He played for hometown club Velež Mostar and Turkish side Bursaspor, making over 280 league appearances and scoring 13 goals. Kalajdžić won the 1980–81 and 1985–86 Yugoslav Cups with Velež.

As a manager, he was the caretaker manager of the Bosnia and Herzegovina national team for one match in 1999 and on three occasions was manager of Velež.

== Playing career ==
Born in SFR Yugoslavia, Kalajdžić started playing professional football for local side Velež Mostar. He would make over 200 Yugoslav First League appearances in a 10-year spell with the club. He also played for the sides that won the 1980–81 and 1985–86 Yugoslav Cup titles.

In 1988, Kalajdžić moved to Turkey, joining Süper Lig side Bursaspor. He made 63 league appearances in two seasons with the club. In 1990, Kalajdžić decided to retire from playing at the age of 31.

== Managerial career ==
After retiring from playing, Kalajdžić became a football manager. In 1999, he was the caretaker manager of the Bosnia and Herzegovina national team and also managed Velež from 1998 to 2000, in 2003 and in 2016.

He worked as an assistant coach in the Bosnia and Herzegovina U21 national team from 2011 to 2012 and at Velež during 2014.

Kalajdžić also led the Velež Mostar U19 team from 2018 to 2019. In August 2019, he became the new assistant manager at Velež, working alongside assistant Mustafa Kodro and manager Feđa Dudić.

== Honours ==
=== Player ===
Velež Mostar

- Yugoslav Cup: 1980–81, 1985–86
