= Ismet Šišić =

Bosnian- Herzegovinian footballer

Personal information
- Full name: Ismet Šišić
- Date of birth: June 4, 1958 (age 68)
- Place of birth: Čapljina, SFR Yugoslavia
- Position: Defender

Senior career*
Years	Team	Apps	(Gls)
1980–1991	Velež Mostar	217	(7)
- * Club domestic league appearances and goals

Ismet Šišić (born 4 June 1958) is a Bosnian retired footballer.

== Club career ==
Šišić spent his entire career with Velež Mostar, winning the 1985–86 Yugoslav Cup with them.
