= Franjo Džidić =

Bosnian football manager (1939–2025)

Personal information
- Date of birth: 31 August 1939
- Place of birth: Mostar, Kingdom of Yugoslavia
- Date of death: 4 January 2025 (aged 85)
- Place of death: Mostar, Bosnia and Herzegovina
- Position: Centre-back

Youth career
- 1955–1958: Velež Mostar

Senior career*
| Years | Team | Apps | (Gls) |
| 1958–1969 | Velež Mostar | | |
| 1969–1972 | Borac Čapljina | | |
| 1972–1974 | Mladost Lištica | | |

Managerial career
- 1972–1974: Mladost Lištica
- 1975–1976: Lokomotiva Mostar
- 1976–1977: Borac Čapljina
- 1984–1988: Leotar
- 1988–1990: Iskra Bugojno
- 1990–1992: Velež Mostar
- 1992–1993: Šibenik
- Samobor
- 1996–1997: Široki Brijeg
- 1997–1998: Zrinjski Mostar
- 2003: Zrinjski Mostar
- 2004–2005: Zrinjski Mostar
- * Club domestic league appearances and goals

Franjo Džidić (31 August 1939 – 4 January 2025) was a Bosnian professional football manager and player. He is inscribed in Zrinjski Mostar history as the manager who won the club's first ever Bosnian Premier League title in the 2004–05 season.

== Playing career ==
Born in Mostar, Kingdom of Yugoslavia, present day Bosnia and Herzegovina, Džidić started playing football in 1955. His father was a miner and lived in a mining colony beside local team Velež Mostar's old stadium (today's "Old Veležovo" or "Old Playground", a neighborhood in the city of Mostar) and began to train in a football school of Velež.

In 1958, Džidić made his first appearance for the first team of Velež. He played for Velež until 1969, after which he joined Borac Čapljina where he remained for three seasons. He had some offers to go abroad, but decided to stay in Yugoslavia, where he remained until the end of his playing career.

In 1972, Džidić joined Mladost Lištica, today known as Široki Brijeg, on a player-manager type contract. Džidić ended his playing career and ultimately stepped down as manager in 1974.

== Managerial career ==
Džidić became a manager after ending his playing career, working as a player-manager at Mladost Lištica, today known as Široki Brijeg, Lokomotiva Mostar and Borac Čapljina, after which for six years he was an assistant manager at Velež Mostar. He assisted Vukašin Višnjevac, Miloš Milutinović and Muhamed Mujić. With Milutinović he won the Yugoslav Cup in 1981, beating Željezničar in the final. One year Džidić was also a football instructor at the level of Bosnia and Herzegovina, and then went to Trebinje to manager Leotar.

He spent four years in Leotar, having remarkable success. Trebinje is enriched by football and created plenty of players who later earned a football reputation and knowledge. Basically he took the players from Mostar, who could not play in Velež and then gained prominence in Leotar. These were: Ibrahim Rahimić, Lučić, Ronćević and Stipe Jurić. After 4 years in Trebinje, Džidić left Leotar.

After Leotar, he went to Iskra Bugojno and spent two years there. Then he returned to the Velež team consisting of: Meho Kodro, Joško Popović, Igor Musa and so on. Džidić was also the last manager of Velež before the Bosnian War.

After the war, he first went to Croatian 1. HNL club Šibenik. After Šibenik, he did a half-season in Samobor, which was then in the 2. HNL, and then returned to Mostar. He later went back to Široki Brijeg and in one season won too, the First League of Herzeg-Bosnia. After that he was named manager of Zrinjski Mostar.

Džidić led Zrinjski for the first time in the 1997–98 First League of Bosnia and Herzegovina play-offs. From the First League of Herzeg-Bosnia, Zrinjski and Široki Brijeg were put in two groups where they waited for their respective opponents of each group, Sarajevo and Čelik Zenica. Zrinjski in the final competition suffered two defeats and failed to qualify for the play-offs final. In 2003, Džidić came back to Zrinjski but shortly after got sacked due to poor results.

In 2004, he once again came back to Zrinjski. That proved to be the right choice, since Džidić led the Zrinjski team to win first place in the Bosnian Premier League in the 2004–05 season, with it going down in history as the first title in Zrinjski's history for the club's one hundredth anniversary.

== Death ==
Džidić died in his hometown Mostar on 4 January 2025, at the age of 86.

== Honours ==
=== Manager ===
Široki Brijeg

- First League of Herzeg-Bosnia: 1996–97

Zrinjski Mostar

- Bosnian Premier League: 2004–05
