= Red Army Mostar =

Supporter group of Velež Mostar

Red Army
- Abbreviation: RA81
- Type: Supporters' group, Ultras group
- Club: FK Velež Mostar
- Motto: Mostar u srcu, Velež do groba! (Mostar in my heart, Velež till I die!); Prestati nećemo nikada (We will never stop)
- Headquarters: Mostar, Bosnia and Herzegovina
- Arenas: Stadion pod Bijelim Brijegom (1981–1992); Stadion Rođeni (1995–present)
- Stand: East (Red Army Tribina)
- Colours
- Website: redarmy-mostar.ba

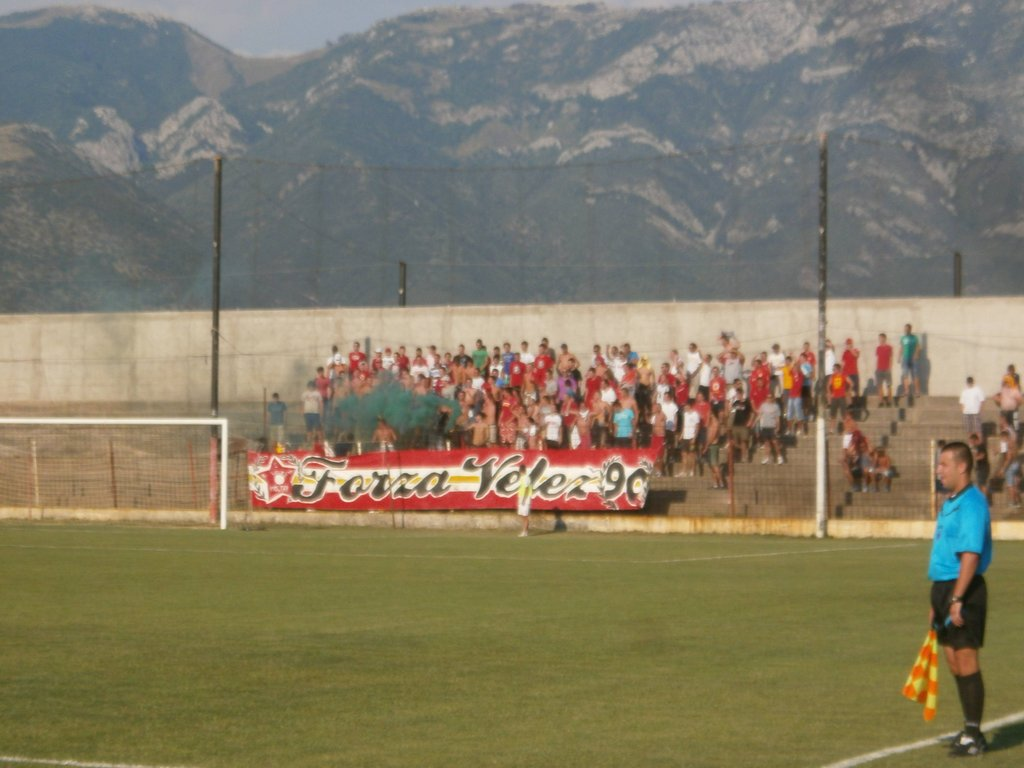
Supporters of FK Velež Mostar

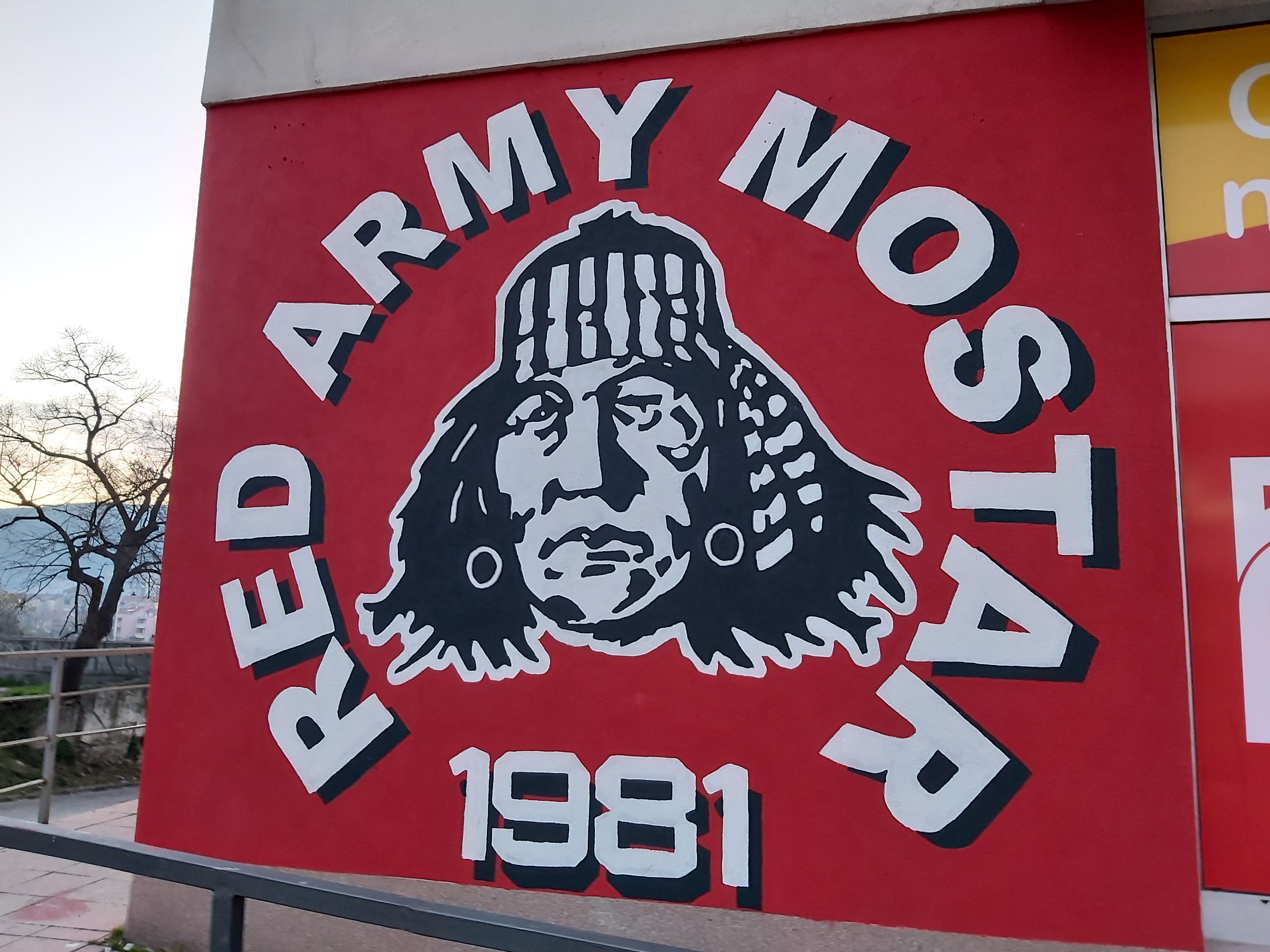
Graffiti Mostar

Red Army Mostar is a FK Velež Mostar supporters' group. It is the oldest supporters group in Bosnia and Herzegovina.

== History ==
Red Army Mostar was founded in 1981 in Mostar under the name Crveni šejtani (Red Devils) after FK Velež Mostar won its first Yugoslav Cup final. The final game was won with a score of 3–2 against FK Željezničar at the Marakana stadium in front of more than 40,000 people. Following its inception, Crveni šejtani fell into a period of decline but resurfaced again in 1986, when FK Velež once again reached the final of the Yugoslav Cup versus Dinamo Zagreb.

The game was won by Velež with a final score of 3–1. After that game, Crveni šejtani was renamed to Red Army. During that period, subgroups formed, including the Zealots, Eagles, Chicago, Furia, Carina and others. The group of FK Velež fans in Sarajevo was called Red Platoon.

During the Yugoslavia period, FK Velež was considered the pride of Herzegovina and was supported by all Herzegovinians. The fan base spanned Yugoslavia, with the most support coming from Konjic, Čapljina, Travnik, Doboj, Tuzla and Dubrovnik.

During the 1985–86 season, Mostar was a town of 110,000 people. However, eight thousand Red Army members traveled to Split to watch a Hajduk-Velež match. This is just one of the many examples of the love that Red Army had for Velež. Velež was viewed as a multi-ethnic team. Many Bosniaks, Croats and Serbs played in FK Velež.

Members of the Red Army are predominantly Bosniaks although the group is welcoming all nationalities. Attendance at the stadium rarely reaches levels seen in the 1980s, but on certain occasions, large numbers of fans gather.

== Present-day ==
Today, the Red Army Mostar is mostly composed of people from Mostar. A few groups come from Ilidža, Konjic, Jablanica, Čapljina and Stolac.

Red Army's biggest rivals today are Ultras Mostar, a supporter group of another team from Mostar HŠK Zrinjski Mostar. The rivalry is based on locality, ethnicity, and politics. FK Velež and Red Army are mostly Bosniak, while HŠK Zrinjski and Ultras are mostly Croat. The rivalry began after the end of the Bosnian War, mostly because of the conflict between Bosniaks and Croats during the war.

The city of Mostar was divided between the east side, which is predominantly Bosniak, and the west side, which is predominantly Croat. Velež's old stadium, Bijeli Brijeg Stadium remained on the west side of Mostar, so the club had to find a new stadium to be able to play matches. Its old stadium was given to Zrinjski. Matches between Velež and Zrinjski are often afflicted with high levels of conflict.

On the 4th of May 2024 members of rival groups "Ultras Zrinjski Mostar" stole approximately 70 banners, shirts, scarfs and drums from "Red Army Mostar". After that the burned them during a rival game between Zrinjski and Velež, which in the tifo world means they are shutting them down as a group. Given the fact that they burned everything they had, Red Army are now only using 2 banners, 1 that says "Prestati Nećemo Nikada" and 1 that says "Velež".
