= Hadžiabdić =

Hadžiabdić is a surname. Notable people with the surname include:

- Džemal Hadžiabdić (born 1953), Bosnia and Herzegovina footballer and manager
- Enver Hadžiabdić (born 1945), Bosnia and Herzegovina footballer and manager
- Mili Hadžiabdić (born 1963), Bosnia and Herzegovina footballer
