= Rahimić =

Rahimić is a Bosnian family name found in Bosnia and Herzegovina. Notable people with the surname include:

- Elvir Rahimić (born 1976), retired Bosnian footballer
- Ibrahim Rahimić (born 1963), retired Bosnian footballer
