= 1957–58 Yugoslav Cup =

1958 Yugoslav Football Cup
11th Marshal Tito Cup

Tournament details
- Country: Yugoslavia
- Dates: 2 February – 29 November
- Teams: 16

Final positions
- Champions: Red Star (4th title)
- Runners-up: Velež

Tournament statistics
- Matches played: 15
- Goals scored: 70 (4.67 per match)
- Goals scored in penalty shoot-outs not included.

The 1957–58 Yugoslav Cup was the 11th season of the top football knockout competition in SFR Yugoslavia, the Yugoslav Cup (Serbo-Croatian: Kup Jugoslavije), also known as the "Marshal Tito Cup" (Kup Maršala Tita), since its establishment in 1946.

== Round of 16 ==
In the following tables winning teams are marked in bold; teams from outside top level are marked in italic script.

Tie no	Home team	Score	Away team
1	**Dinamo Zagreb**	2–1	BSK Belgrade
2	**Partizan**	11–0	Pobeda Prilep
3	Radnički Sombor	2–2 (3–4 p)	**Hajduk Split**
4	**Red Star**	3–1	Budućnost Titograd
5	**RNK Split**	4–1	ŽŠD Maribor
6	**Velež**	4–3	Radnički Belgrade
7	**NK Zagreb**	4–1	Budućnost Smederevo
8	Željezničar Sarajevo	1–2	**Vojvodina**

== Quarter-finals ==
Tie no	Home team	Score	Away team
1	**Hajduk Split**	4–2	Vojvodina
2	**Red Star**	1–1 (3–2 p)	Dinamo Zagreb
3	RNK Split	1–3	**Velež**
4	NK Zagreb	1–3	**Partizan**

== Semi-finals ==
Tie no	Home team	Score	Away team
1	Partizan	2–3	**Red Star**
2	**Velež**	3–0	Hajduk Split

== Final ==
29 November 1958

Red Star	4–0	Velež
Kostić 61', 71'; Borozan 68'; Rudinski 73'

Stadion JNA, Belgrade
Attendance: 30,000
Referee: Emil Erlich (Ljubljana)

RED STAR:
GK	**1**	(Socialist Federal Republic of Yugoslavia) Vladimir Beara
	**2**	(Socialist Federal Republic of Yugoslavia) Vladimir Durković
	**3**	(Socialist Federal Republic of Yugoslavia) Miljan Zeković
	**4**	(Socialist Federal Republic of Yugoslavia) Ranko Borozan
	**5**	(Socialist Federal Republic of Yugoslavia) Branko Nešović
	**6**	(Socialist Federal Republic of Yugoslavia) Vladica Popović
	**7**	(Socialist Federal Republic of Yugoslavia) Nikola Stipić
	**8**	(Socialist Federal Republic of Yugoslavia) Rajko Mitić
	**9**	(Socialist Federal Republic of Yugoslavia) Ivan Popović	Substituted off
	**10**	(Socialist Federal Republic of Yugoslavia) Dušan Maravić
	**11**	(Socialist Federal Republic of Yugoslavia) Bora Kostić
Substitutes:
	?	(Socialist Federal Republic of Yugoslavia) Antun Rudinski	Substituted on
Manager:
(Socialist Federal Republic of Yugoslavia) Miša Pavić

VELEŽ:
GK	1	(Socialist Federal Republic of Yugoslavia) Zdravko Brkljačić
	2	(Socialist Federal Republic of Yugoslavia) Mensud Dilberović
	3	(Socialist Federal Republic of Yugoslavia) Meho Handžić
	4	(Socialist Federal Republic of Yugoslavia) Zdravko Rodin
	5	(Socialist Federal Republic of Yugoslavia) Nikola Benco
	6	(Socialist Federal Republic of Yugoslavia) Kruno Radiljević
	7	(Socialist Federal Republic of Yugoslavia) Milan Maksimović
	8	(Socialist Federal Republic of Yugoslavia) Franjo Džidić
	9	(Socialist Federal Republic of Yugoslavia) Omer Oručević
	10	(Socialist Federal Republic of Yugoslavia) Šefik Alajbegović
	11	(Socialist Federal Republic of Yugoslavia) Milorad Lazović
Manager:
(Socialist Federal Republic of Yugoslavia) Ratomir Čabrić

== See also ==
- 1957–58 Yugoslav First League
- 1957–58 Yugoslav Second League
