= Sead Kajtaz =

Bosnian footballer and manager (born 1963)

Personal information
- Date of birth: 14 February 1963 (age 63)
- Place of birth: Mostar, SFR Yugoslavia
- Position: Striker

Youth career
- –1981: Velež Mostar

Senior career*
Years	Team	Apps	(Gls)
1981–1990	Velež Mostar	167	(26)
1990–1991	1. FC Nürnberg	8	(1)
Total		175	(27)

International career
1986	Yugoslavia	1	(0)

Managerial career
- Velež Mostar
- 2009–2010: Velež Mostar (assistant)
- * Club domestic league appearances and goals

Sead Kajtaz (born 14 February 1963) is a Bosnian retired footballer and manager. He was capped once for the Yugoslavia national football team. He is the father of Bosnian and Croatian swimmer Amina Kajtaz.

== International career ==
He made his debut for Yugoslavia in a May 1986 friendly match away against Belgium in which he came on as a late substitute for Haris Škoro. It remained his sole international appearance.

== Later years ==
After retiring, he kept linked with FK Velež Mostar where he held many different positions, from president, sports director and coach.

== Honours ==
=== Club ===
Velež Mostar

- Yugoslav Cup: 1985–86
