= Vukašin Petranović =

Montenegrin footballer and coach

Personal information
- Full name: Vukašin Petranović
- Date of birth: 6 November 1962 (age 63)
- Place of birth: Cetinje, FPR Yugoslavia
- Position: Goalkeeper

Senior career*
Years	Team	Apps	(Gls)
1980–1981	Lovćen	2	(0)
1981–1984	Dinamo Zagreb	0	(0)
1984–1985	GOŠK-Jug	30	(0)
1985–1990	Velež Mostar	134	(0)
1990–1992	Trabzonspor	45	(0)
1992–1993	Konyaspor	13	(0)
1994–1995	Vevče Donit Filtri	14	(0)
1995–1996	Korotan Prevalje	2	(0)
1996–1997	Sarajevo	3	(0)
1997–1998	Olimpik	10	(0)
1998–1999	Zmaj od Bosne	14	(0)
Total		257	(0)

Managerial career
- 2009–2010: Al-Ittihad (goalkeeping coach)
- 2016–2017: Rudar Velenje (goalkeeping coach)
- 2020: Vis Simm-Bau (goalkeeping coach)
- * Club domestic league appearances and goals

Vukašin Petranović (born 6 December 1962) is a Montenegrin professional football goalkeeping coach and former player.

Petranović was a product of the Dinamo Zagreb youth system but failed to achieve playing for the first team. During his career, he won three national cup titles with Velež Mostar, Trabzonspor and Sarajevo.

== Honours ==
=== Player ===
Velež Mostar

- Yugoslav Cup: 1985–86

Trabzonspor

- Turkish Cup: 1991–92

Sarajevo

- Bosnian Cup: 1996–97
