= Zdravko Brkljačić =

Croatian footballer (born 1936)

Personal information
- Date of birth: 22 May 1936 (age 90)
- Place of birth: Varaždin, Kingdom of Yugoslavia
- Position: Goalkeeper

Senior career*
Years	Team	Apps	(Gls)
1954–1957	Lokomotiva Zagreb	4	(0)
1957–1959	Velež Mostar	32	(0)
1959–1960	Vojvodina	7	(0)
1961–1963	Karlovac	45	(0)
1963–1966	Dinamo Zagreb	1	(0)
1966–1967	Wiener Sport-Club	8	(0)
1967–1972	AA Gent	125	(0)
1972–1974	Standard Liège	5	(0)

International career
	Yugoslavia U-21	1	(0)
- * Club domestic league appearances and goals

Zdravko Brkljačić (born 22 May 1936) is a former Croatian football goalkeeper who played in several clubs in Yugoslavia, Austria and Belgium.

== Club career ==
Born in Varaždin, he started playing in NK Lokomotiva. However, he failed to break into the starting eleven, so he moved to FK Velež Mostar where he had a busy two seasons. In 1959 he moved to FK Vojvodina where he stayed for a year and a half. He played with NK Karlovac before moving to Dinamo Zagreb where he stayed three seasons as a substitute goalkeeper; he played only one match in the Yugoslav First League with them. Afterwards, he moved abroad, first playing one season in Austria with Wiener Sport-Club, and then to Belgium where he played seven years in top flight clubs K.A.A. Gent and Standard Liège. He played one match for the Yugoslav U-21 team.

== External sources ==
- Zdravko Brkljačić at WorldFootball.net
