= FK 14. Oktobar =

FK 14 Oktobar
- Full name: Fudbalski Klub 14 Oktobar
- Founded: 1926; 100 years ago
- Dissolved: 2007
- Ground: Kruševac
Home colours

FK 14 Oktobar is a Serbian football club based in Kruševac, Serbia. Although the club formally ceased to exist in 2007, they celebrated their 90-year anniversary in a veteran players' match against city rivals Trayal in 2016.

== Notable players ==
- Marko Đorđević
