= Semir Tuce =

Bosnian retired footballer (born 1964)

Personal information
- Date of birth: 11 February 1964 (age 62)
- Place of birth: Mostar, SFR Yugoslavia
- Position: Left winger

Senior career*
Years	Team	Apps	(Gls)
1981–1989	Velež Mostar	173	(55)
1989–1995	Luzern	116	(28)
Total		289	(83)

International career
1982–1985	Yugoslavia U21	9	(2)
1986–1989	Yugoslavia	7	(2)
- * Club domestic league appearances and goals

Semir Tuce (born 11 February 1964) is a Bosnian retired footballer, who played as left winger.

He was part of the Velež Mostar second golden era, which won the 1985–86 Yugoslav Cup.

== Club career ==
=== Velež Mostar ===
Tuce was born in Mostar and started to play professionally for FK Velež Mostar in 1983, and became one of their best players. He would shoot with his left foot, and was noted in the Yugoslav First League. During his career in Velež, he played 177 league games and scored 55 goals. In 1986, he won the Yugoslav Cup with Velež. The same year, in 1986, he was named the Yugoslav Footballer of the Year.

=== Luzern ===
In 1989, he moved to Switzerland to play for FC Luzern. He played in Switzerland for 5 years. He won the Swiss Cup with the club in 1992. He ended his career at Luzern in 1995.

== International career ==
Tuce made his debut for Yugoslavia in an October 1986 European Championship qualification match against Turkey and has earned a total of 7 caps, scoring 2 goals. His final international was an April 1989 friendly match against Greece.

=== International goals ===
Scores and results table. Yugoslavia's goal tally first:

#	Date	Venue	Opponent	Score	Result	Competition
1	25 March 1987	Gradski-Stadion, Banja Luka, Yugoslavia	Austria	3–0	4–0	Friendly
2	5 April 1989	Olympic Stadium, Athens, Greece	Greece	2–1	4–1	Friendly

== Personal life ==
On the 22 of April 2021 Tuce experienced a heart attack in his hometown Kriens, in Switzerland.

== Honours ==
=== Player ===
Velež Mostar

- Yugoslav Cup: 1985–86

Luzern

- Swiss Cup: 1991–92

=== Individual ===
Awards

- Yugoslav Footballer of the Year: 1986
