= Vukašin Višnjevac =

Yugoslav football manager and player (1937–2019)

Personal information
- Full name: Vukašin Višnjevac
- Date of birth: 10 June 1937
- Place of birth: Gacko, Kingdom of Yugoslavia
- Date of death: 26 September 2019 (aged 82)
- Place of death: Belgrade, Serbia
- Position: Midfielder

Senior career*
Years	Team	Apps	(Gls)
1954–1957	Sarajevo	18	(3)
1959–1960	Igman Ilidža	5	(2)
1960–1961	Sloga Doboj		
1962–1963	BSK Slavonski Brod	16	(0)
1963–1967	Istra		

Managerial career
- 1975–1977: Sarajevo
- 1977–1980: Velež Mostar
- 1980–1981: Olimpija Ljubljana
- 1981–1982: Sutjeska Nikšić
- 1982–1984: Vardar
- 1984: Priština
- 1985: Vojvodina
- 1985–1986: Vardar
- 1986–1987: Sutjeska Nikšić
- 1988: Čelik Zenica
- 1998: Jordan
- 1999: Spartak Subotica
- 2010: Leotar
- * Club domestic league appearances and goals

Vukašin Višnjevac (Serbian Cyrillic: Вукашин Вишњевац; 10 June 1937 (Note: Many sources erroneously give his date of birth as 15 June 1939.) – 26 September 2019) was a Yugoslav football manager and player.

== Playing career ==
Višnjevac spent three seasons with Sarajevo from 1954 to 1957, making 18 appearances and scoring three goals in the Yugoslav First League. He later played for three different clubs in the Yugoslav Second League – Igman Ilidža, BSK Slavonski Brod, and Istra.

== Managerial career ==
After hanging up his boots, Višnjevac started his managerial career at Rovinj. He went on to manage numerous Yugoslav First League clubs, including Sarajevo, Velež Mostar, Olimpija Ljubljana, Vardar, Vojvodina, Sutjeska Nikšić, and Čelik Zenica.

During the 1990s, Višnjevac served as manager of Kuwaiti club Al-Salmiya. He also spent two months in charge of the Jordan national team from July to September 1998.

In September 2010, Višnjevac was appointed as manager of Bosnian Premier League club Leotar, but stepped down from his position the following month.
