= 1985–86 Yugoslav Cup =

Marshal Tito Cup

Tournament details
- Country: Yugoslavia

Final positions
- Champions: Velež (2nd title)
- Runners-up: Dinamo Zagreb

Tournament statistics
- Top goal scorer: Marko Mlinarić (5)

The 1985–86 Yugoslav Cup was the 38th season of the top football knockout competition in SFR Yugoslavia, the Yugoslav Cup (Serbo-Croatian: Kup Jugoslavije), also known as the "Marshal Tito Cup" (Kup Maršala Tita), since its establishment in 1946. It was won by Velež.

== Calendar ==
Round	Date	Fixtures	Clubs
First round	30 October 1985	16	32 → 16
Second round	20 November 1985	8	16 → 8
Quarter-finals	22–23 February 1986	8	8 → 4
Semi-finals	9 April 1986	4	4 → 2
Final	14 May 1986	2	2 → 1

== First round ==
In the following tables winning teams are marked in bold; teams from outside top level are marked in italic script.

Tie no	Home team	Score	Away team
1	Borac Travnik	1–4	**Hajduk Split**
2	**BSK Slavonski Brod**	3–0	Sloboda
3	**Red Star**	2–0	OFK Kikinda
4	**Dinamo Zagreb**	2–1	Iskra
5	**Šibenik**	3–1	Vojvodina
6	Liria	1–2	**Vardar**
7	Lovćen	0–4	**Partizan**
8	**Maribor**	1–0	Prishtina
9	**Osijek**	5–0	AIK Bačka Topola
10	**Rijeka**	4–1	Belasica
11	**OFK Belgrade**	3–0	Dinamo Vinkovci
12	**14. Oktobar**	2–1	Sutjeska
13	**Rad**	1–0 (3–5 p)	Sarajevo
14	Samobor	0–1	**Budućnost**
15	Željezničar Doboj	1–5	**Velež**
16	Željezničar Sarajevo	2–2 (7–8 p)	**Radnički Niš**

== Second round ==
Tie no	Home team	Score	Away team
1	BSK Slavonski Brod	1–1 (4–5 p)	**Dinamo Zagreb**
2	**Budućnost**	1–0	Rijeka
3	Hajduk Split	0–0 (3–4 p)	**OFK Belgrade**
4	**Osijek**	1–0	Maribor
5	**Partizan**	5–0	14. Oktobar
6	**Radnički Niš**	1–0	Šibenik
7	Vardar	0–2	**Red Star**
8	**Velež**	2–0	Rad

== Quarter-finals ==
Tie no	Home team	Score	Away team
1	**Red Star**	3–1	Osijek
2	**OFK Belgrade**	4–1	Budućnost
3	Partizan	1–1 (3–5 p)	**Velež**
4	Radnički Niš	2–2 (5–6 p)	**Dinamo Zagreb**

== Semi-finals ==
Tie no	Home team	Score	Away team
1	**Dinamo Zagreb**	4–0	Red Star
2	**Velež**	3–0	OFK Belgrade

== Final ==
14 May 1986

Velež	3–1	Dinamo Zagreb
Bijedić 6' (pen.), 51'; P. Jurić 87'		Mlinarić 58'

Stadion JNA, Belgrade
Attendance: 40,000
Referee: Dušan Čolić (Belgrade)

**Velež**	**Dinamo**

GK	1	(Socialist Federal Republic of Yugoslavia) Vukašin Petranović
MF	2	(Socialist Federal Republic of Yugoslavia) Draženko Prskalo
DF	3	(Socialist Federal Republic of Yugoslavia) Goran Jurić
DF	4	(Socialist Federal Republic of Yugoslavia) Nenad Bijedić
DF	5	(Socialist Federal Republic of Yugoslavia) Vladimir Matijević (c)	(red card) 90'
DF	6	(Socialist Federal Republic of Yugoslavia) Ismet Šišić
FW	7	(Socialist Federal Republic of Yugoslavia) Sead Kajtaz
MF	8	(Socialist Federal Republic of Yugoslavia) Vladimir Skočajić
FW	9	(Socialist Federal Republic of Yugoslavia) Predrag Jurić
MF	10	(Socialist Federal Republic of Yugoslavia) Anel Karabeg		(substituted off) 74'
FW	11	(Socialist Federal Republic of Yugoslavia) Semir Tuce
Substitutes:
MF	13	(Socialist Federal Republic of Yugoslavia) Vladimir Gudelj		(substituted on) 74'
Manager:
(Socialist Federal Republic of Yugoslavia) Dušan Bajević

GK	**1**	(Socialist Federal Republic of Yugoslavia) Ranko Stojić
MF	**2**	(Socialist Federal Republic of Yugoslavia) Milivoj Bračun		(substituted off) 70'
FW	**3**	(Socialist Federal Republic of Yugoslavia) Željko Cupan
DF	**4**	(Socialist Federal Republic of Yugoslavia) Mustafa Arslanović
DF	**5**	(Socialist Federal Republic of Yugoslavia) Mirko Lulić
DF	**6**	(Socialist Federal Republic of Yugoslavia) Srečko Katanec
DF	**7**	(Socialist Federal Republic of Yugoslavia) Zvjezdan Cvetković	(red card) 75'
MF	**8**	(Socialist Federal Republic of Yugoslavia) Mladen Munjaković
MF	**9**	(Socialist Federal Republic of Yugoslavia) Snježan Cerin
FW	**10**	(Socialist Federal Republic of Yugoslavia) Marko Mlinarić (c)
FW	**11**	(Socialist Federal Republic of Yugoslavia) Borislav Cvetković
Substitutes:
MF	?	(Socialist Federal Republic of Yugoslavia) Dražen Besek		(substituted on) 70'
Manager:
(Socialist Federal Republic of Yugoslavia) Miroslav Blažević

== See also ==
- 1985–86 Yugoslav First League
- 1985–86 Yugoslav Second League
