= Ibrahim Rahimić =

Bosnian footballer (born 1963)

Personal information
- Date of birth: 17 April 1963 (age 63)
- Place of birth: Mostar, SFR Yugoslavia
- Position: Defender

Youth career
- 1969–1982: Velež Mostar

Senior career*
Years	Team	Apps	(Gls)
1982–1983	Velež Mostar	1	(0)
1984–1988	Leotar	48	(3)
1988–1991	Velež Mostar	87	(2)
Total		136	(5)

Managerial career
- 2012–2013: Velež Mostar
- 2015–2016: Mladost Doboj Kakanj
- 2016–2019: Velež Mostar
- 2019: Mladost Doboj Kakanj
- 2025–2026: Velež Mostar
- * Club domestic league appearances and goals

Ibrahim "Ibro" Rahimić (born 17 April 1963) is a Bosnian professional football manager and former player who played as a defender.

== Playing career ==
Rahimić played for hometown club Velež Mostar on two occasions and also for Leotar. He was part of the Velež team that played the 1988–89 Yugoslav Cup final match against Partizan. He had to retire from football in 1991 at the early age of 28, due to a serious knee injury sustained in a Yugoslav league match while playing for Velež.

Rahimić made over 100 appearances for Velež in all competitions, as well as nearly 50 league matches for Leotar.

== Managerial career ==
=== Velež Mostar ===
In September 2012, Rahimić was named the new manager of Velež. In his first season with the club, Velež finished 13th in the league, avoiding relegation. In September 2013, after a poor start to the 2013–14 season, Rahimić was sacked.

=== Mladost Doboj Kakanj ===
On 14 June 2015, Rahimić became the new manager of Bosnian Premier League newcomer Mladost Doboj Kakanj. In his first season with Mladost, the club finished in 10th place in the league and avoided relegation. After a good start to the next season, Rahimić left Mladost to return to Velež in September 2016.

=== Return to Velež ===
On 26 September, Rahimić was appointed manager of Velež. After two seasons, Rahimić guided Velež to promotion to the Bosnian Premier League after finishing first in the 2018–19 season.

On 5 August 2019, following a series of poor results in the 2019–20 Premier League season, Rahimić resigned as Velež manager.

=== Return to Mladost ===
One month after leaving Velež, Rahimić returned to Mladost Doboj Kakanj on 10 September. His first competitive game back in charge of Mladost ended in a 1–0 away loss to Čelik Zenica on 14 September. His first win at Mladost was in a cup game against Jedinstvo Bihać four days later.

On 27 November 2019, it was announced by Mladost that Rahimić had left the club by mutual consent after disappointing results.

=== Third stint at Velež ===
On 17 July 2025, Rahimić was appointed sporting director of Velež Mostar. On 1 October 2025, he additionally took charge as caretaker manager amidst an unexpected early relegation battle. He was victorious in his first game back, beating Sloga Doboj 2–0 at home on 4 October. After managing to improve the side's performances, losing just once in Velež's eleven games since taking over, Rahimić was appointed on a permanent basis in December 2025. He managed to lead the side to a fourth place finish in the league, and reached the Bosnian Cup final where they were defeated by rivals Zrinjski; this was enough for Velež to secure themselves a spot in the 2026–27 UEFA Conference League qualifiers.

Velež started off the 2026–27 season by eliminating Milsami Orhei in the UEFA Conference League first qualifying round. They were then eliminated in the second qualifying round by DAC Dunajská Streda, losing 4–0 on aggregate. After losing four, and winning only one of their opening six league matches, Rahimić resigned as both manager and sporting director of Velež on 10 September 2026.

== Managerial statistics ==
As of match played 6 September 2026

Managerial record by team and tenure
Team	From	To	Record							
Team	From	To	G	W	D	L	GF	GA	GD	Win %
Velež Mostar	25 September 2012	26 September 2013	35	11	13	11	43	34	+9	31.43
Mladost Doboj Kakanj	14 June 2015	26 September 2016	46	17	15	14	55	54	+1	36.96
Velež Mostar	26 September 2016	5 August 2019	88	50	21	17	165	71	+94	56.82
Mladost Doboj Kakanj	10 September 2019	27 November 2019	12	3	2	7	12	24	−12	25.00
Velež Mostar	1 October 2025	10 September 2026	45	20	11	14	49	42	+7	44.44
Total			226	101	62	63	324	225	+99	44.69

== Honours ==
=== Manager ===
Velež Mostar

- First League of FBiH: 2018–19
- Bosnian Cup runner-up: 2025–26
