= Nenad Bijedić =

Yugoslav footballer

Personal information
- Date of birth: 24 September 1959
- Place of birth: Mostar, SR Bosnia and Herzegovina, SFR Yugoslavia
- Date of death: 15 August 2011 (aged 51)
- Place of death: Mostar, Bosnia and Herzegovina
- Height: 1.85 m (6 ft 1 in)
- Position: Midfielder

Youth career
- 1970–1979: Velež Mostar

Senior career*
Years	Team	Apps	(Gls)
1979–1986	Velež Mostar	138	(17)
1986–1991	Bursaspor	125	(41)
Total		263	(58)

Managerial career
- 1994: Bursaspor (assistant)
- 1994–1996: Bursaspor
- 1996–1997: Karşıyaka
- 1997–1998: Kardemir Karabükspor
- 1998–1999: Bursaspor
- 1999–2000: Adanaspor
- 2000: Konyaspor
- 2000–2002: Bursaspor
- 2005–2006: Diyarbakırspor
- 2006–2007: Sakaryaspor
- 2008: Eskişehirspor
- * Club domestic league appearances and goals

Nenad "Ćeća" Bijedić (Turkish: Nejat Biyediç or Nejat Vardar; 24 September 1959 – 15 August 2011) was a Bosnian and naturalized Turkish football manager and player. He began playing football in FK Velez Mostar.

== Playing career ==
=== Club ===
Bijedić arrived at Bursaspor at the age of 27. He scored 17 goals in the 1987–88 season, resulting in him being nicknamed İmparator ("Emperor") by the fans and making him the most prolific striker in the team's history, scoring the most goals in a season until then.

== Managerial career ==
He worked for Bursaspor, Karşıyaka S.K., Adanaspor, Konyaspor, Karabükspor, Diyarbakırspor, Sakaryaspor, and Eskişehirspor as a coach.

== Personal life ==
Bijedić was born in Mostar, the second of three children. He studied economics.

=== Death ===
On 15 August 2011, Biyediç died of leukemia in Mostar, his hometown, just 10 days after he arrived from Turkey following a long-term treatment.
