= FK Velež Mostar =

Association football club in Bosnia and Herzegovina

Velež Mostar
- Full name: Fudbalski klub Velež Mostar
- Nickname: Rođeni (The Born)
- Short name: Velež, VEL
- Founded: 26 June 1922 (104 years ago)
- Ground: Stadion Rođeni
- Capacity: 7,000
- President: Admir Rahimić
- Manager: Damir Milanović
- League: Premier League BH
- 2025–26: Premier League BH, 4th of 10
- Website: fkvelez.ba
Home colours	Away colours

Fudbalski klub Velež Mostar (Serbo-Croatian Cyrillic: Фудбалски клуб Beлеж Мостар; English: Football club Velež Mostar) is a professional football club based in Mostar, Bosnia and Herzegovina. Founded in 1922, the club is one of the most successful clubs from Bosnia and Herzegovina.

The club currently plays at Rođeni Stadium (7,000 capacity), but its historic stadium is the Bijeli Brijeg (9,000 capacity). Due to the divisions between Bosniak and Croat territories, Velež lost its previous home ground of Bijeli Brijeg in 1992. That stadium was largely used by Velež during the glory days of the club, when they triumphed in the 1981 and 1986 Yugoslav Cups. The club also reached the quarter-final stage of the 1974–75 UEFA Cup. Velež have a bitter rivalry with city neighbours, HŠK Zrinjski Mostar.

The club is named after a nearby mountain Velež, which in itself is named after one of the old Slavic gods, Veles. The club's motto is Mostar u srcu, Velež do groba! (Mostar in my heart, Velež till I die!).

During the time of former Yugoslavia, Velež was always in the Yugoslav First League and the team often ended the season in the top ten. Velež was the most popular and most successful team from Herzegovina to play in the top Yugoslav League. The team was very popular in Herzegovina, but also had fans all over Yugoslavia, and had a mixture of fans from all three main ethnic groups.

Today, Velež is in the Football Association of Bosnia and Herzegovina and is active in the Premier League of Bosnia and Herzegovina, and still has a mixture of fans from all three main ethnic groups. The team was relegated to the First League of the Federation from the Premier League in 2003, and again in 2016. However, Velež was promoted to the top league of the country in 2019, and won the Bosnian Cup in 2022.

In the summer of 2005, the club's assembly returned the five-pointed red star, also known as the petokraka, to their logo. The red star has been the symbol of the club since its founding in 1922.

== History ==
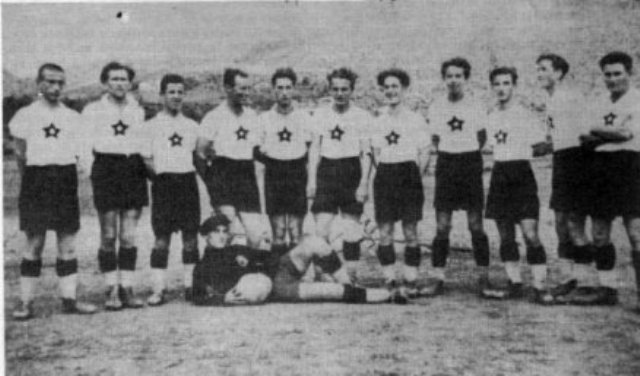
Velež Mostar squad in 1939

At the beginning of 1922, drawing on experiences from other parts of the country, an initiative was proposed to establish a workers' sports society in Mostar. The goal was to unite the city's workers and other football fans, while also serving as a focal point for the working class struggle in defense of social and labor rights.

=== Before World War II (1922–1941) ===
On 26 June 1922, in a suburb of Mostar called Sjeverni logor, Velež Mostar were founded with the prefix RŠD (Radničko športsko društvo) or Workers' Sports Club. The initiative came from Gojko Vuković, a revolutionary and respected citizen of Mostar who, at that time, enjoyed great authority both among workers and among prominent citizens of the city. There were many suggestions for the name, however the name Velež eventually came from the name of a nearby mountain, highest in the vicinity of the city. Velež's first kits were black and white due to destitution and poverty. Velež only started playing in red after a board member named Vaso Pucarić brought them from Zagreb. Velež's first derby with another club from Mostar, Zrinjski was canceled after Zrinjski's players wanted Velež's players to take off the red stars from their kits and Velež refused to do so. The club was sympathetic to worker's rights and socialism, which made it a big target from the Kingdom of Yugoslavia, who frequently harassed players and supporters. Before the war there existed a league for clubs within the city: Velež, Zrinjski, SK Vardar and the JSK (Jugoslovenski sportski klub). Velež had won this competition twice in the 1929 and 1930 seasons. At one point during this time 3,500 people were members of Velež. On 1 September 1940 Velež played a friendly versus a team from Podgorica called Crna Gora. After the game players and those in attendance started a protest against the Yugoslav government on the streets of Mostar. Police shot at demonstrators and in 2 days the club was banned. During the Second World War many members of Velež joined the Yugoslav Partisans and 77 footballers from Velež were said to have lost their lives during the war. 9 players were awarded the Order of the People's Hero award by the new socialist government, 8 of which posthumously. The only living player given the medal was former captain Mehmed Trbonja.

=== Velež in SFR Yugoslavia (1945–1992) ===
==== Early days in the top flight (1945–1968) ====
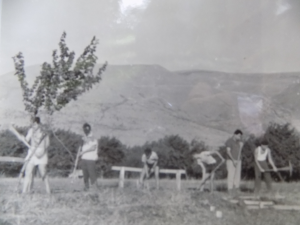
A youth work action for constructing the Bijeli Brijeg Stadium between 1947 and 1958

After the war ended, the new socialist government banned clubs that participated in football tournaments organized by the Independent State of Croatia, including Zrinjski. Vardar and JSK also disbanded, which left Velež as the only active football club in Mostar, a city of 48,000 people by 1948. Before the war, all teams in Mostar played in Sjeverni logor, which was technically owned by JSK. The stadium was in bad shape, there was no boundary between the pitch and the stands and one newspaper outlet said it should be banned to play games in Mostar. In response the city council decided to build a modern stadium for the time in the Bijeli Brijeg suburb; equipped with a training ground, locker rooms and offices for club officials. Between 1947 and 1956 construction was made possible by youth work actions, with some involvement from unions and independent firms. Work stopped at various intervals due to lack of mechanization, but from June 1956 onwards resources that were necessary for completion were given and development of the stadium finished much faster. On 7 September 1958 Velež played their first ever game at the Bijeli Brijeg stadium: a 2–1 victory versus FK Željezničar.

In the 1952–53 season for the first time ever, Velež appeared in the top flight of any league but were relegated. Velež's top scorers were Vladimir Zelenika with 9 goals in 11 games and captain Haldun Hrvić with 7 goals in 22 games. After 2 seasons in the second tier Velež were promoted and competed in the 1955–56 Yugoslav First League where they finished seventh out of 14 teams. For the duration of the entire Yugoslav First League Velež were never relegated again. During the early days of Velež in the top flight, one of the most well respected players was Muhamed Mujić, who played over 400 games and was joint top scorer for the 1955–56 season. Because of this he became Velež's first player to receive a call up to the SFR Yugoslavia national football team versus Hungary in 1956. He scored 17 goals in 32 appearances, played in Melbourne for the 1956 Olympics and in Chile for the 1962 World Cup but his career with the national team ended abruptly after a bad foul on Soviet player Eduard Dubinski, which indirectly caused Dubinski's death 7 years later. The Yugoslav Football Association sent Mujić back home and he never played another international game again.

In the 1957–58 Yugoslav Cup, Velež became the first Bosnian team to reach the final, after beating Radnički Beograd, RNK Split and Hajduk Split in previous rounds. In front of a crowd of 30,000 at the Stadion JNA, Velež lost 4–0 after a lacklustre performance that served more as Rajko Mitić's farewell game than a cup final.

29 November 1958

Red Star	4–0	Velež
Kostić 61', 71'; Borozan 68'; Rudinski 73'

Stadion JNA, Belgrade
Attendance: 30,000
Referee: Emil Erlich (Ljubljana)

==== Sulejman Sula Rebac becomes manager (1968–1976) ====
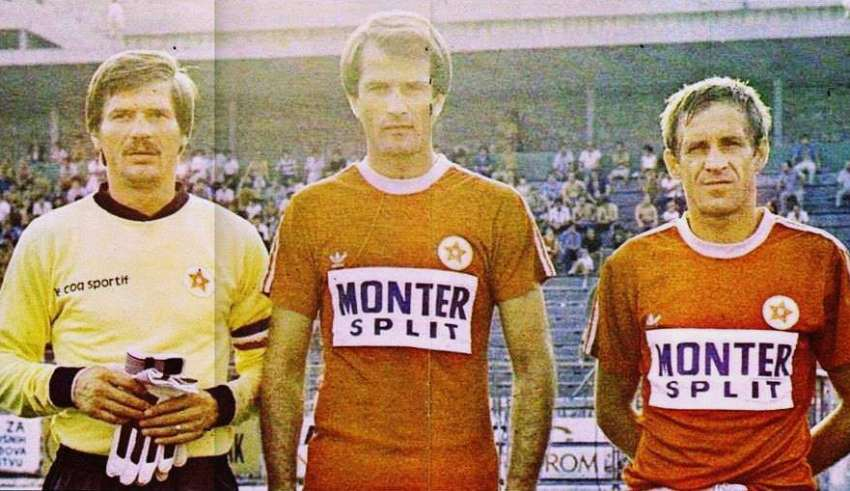
The famous BMV trio (from left to right): Enver Marić, Dušan Bajević and Franjo Vladić

In 1968, former player Sulejman "Sula" Rebac who had played over 500 games for Velež became manager. At this point, Velež were a steady midtable-team in the first division however under the guidance of Rebac Velež would experience a meteoric rise that culminated in reaching the UEFA cup quarterfinals. His first full season in 1968–69 saw an 8th-place finish in which the main focus was Rebac successfully utilizing Velež's youth team, a tradition Velež held right up until the Bosnian War. The first players to come through the academy were goalkeeper Enver Marić and striker Dušan Bajević. They and midfielder Franjo Vladić would make up the famous BMV trio (named after the German car manufacturer) which was one of the most prolific partnerships in the history of Bosnian football. The 1969–70 season saw Velež finish third and Bajević joint top scorer alongside Slobodan Santrač with 20 goals each. 1970 also saw Bajević's first call-up to the national team, a 1–1 draw versus Austria in which he scored on his debut. Bajević would go on to make 37 appearances and score 29 goals, including a hat-trick against Zaire in a 9–0 demolition during the 1974 World Cup. In the 1972–73 Velež placed 2nd in the league, their best position yet and qualified for the UEFA cup, their first ever European competition. They were knocked out in the first round to Tatran Prešov.

11 December 1974

Velež	4–1	Derby County
Primorac 14' (pen.); Pecelj 29'; Vladić 51'; Bajević 85' (pen.)		Hector 56'

Stadion pod Bijelim Brijegom, Mostar
Attendance: 20,000
Referee: Charles Corver (Netherlands)

The 1973–74 season was one of Velež's best. In the league, Velež were in a neck and neck race with Hajduk Split. After the 32nd and 33rd round, Hajduk and Velež had the same number of points; with Hajduk having the better goal difference. On the final day of the season, both won their games and Hajduk won the league on account of goal difference. In Europe the following season, Velež won on away goals against Spartak Moscow in the first round and against Rapid Wien in the second round. In the third round they were faced with Derby County, who would go on to win the First Division that season. They lost 3–1 in the first leg at the Baseball Ground. Franjo Vladić scored Velež's only goal that day. The second leg at the Bijeli Brijeg stadium featured a remarkable upset. Boro Primorac, another prodigy of Rebac, scored in the 14th minute with a follow-up goal from Vladimir Pecelj in the 29th minute. Vladić scored in the 51st minute and Velež had a 4–3 lead. Kevin Hector scored for Derby in the 75th minute and the aggregate was tied at 4–4. In the 85th minute Velež were awarded a penalty which Dušan Bajević scored. The game ended 5–4 on aggregate and Velež went on to the quarterfinals. There they faced FC Twente, and lost 2–1 on aggregate. After the UEFA Cup run, Rebac resigned, while the core of the team was also leaving. Marić left for Schalke 04 in 1976, Bajević left to join AEK Athens in 1977, with Vladić following him in 1979.

==== Rebuilding and first trophies (1976–1992) ====
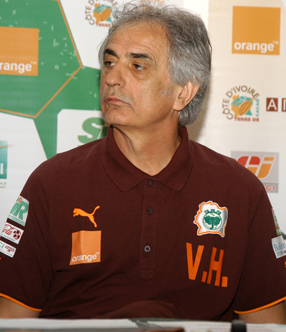
Vahid Halilhodžić (pictured in 2008) is often cited as one of Velež's best players

With the trio that Velež had depended upon now missing, the rest of Velež's squad now had a chance to shine: Džemal Hadžiabdić, his younger brother Mili, Marko Čolić, Vladimir Pecelj, Jadranko Topić, Blaž Slišković but none were an integral part of post-BMV Velež more than Vahid Halilhodžić. He scored 253 goals in 376 matches and solidified himself as one of Velež's best ever players. During the 1976 transfer window he was a keen transfer target for many important Yugoslav clubs including Partizan, Dinamo Zagreb and Red Star Belgrade because of his performances for the national team, but ultimately stayed at Velež. The act did not pay off as Velež finished 11th, miles off pace compared to the clubs trying to buy Halilhodžić. The next 2 seasons saw some improvement, finishing 7th and 5th, respectively. In the 1979–80 season, Velež finished 8th and the manager at the time, Vukašin Višnjevac was sacked and replaced with Miloš Milutinović, famously known as Plava čigra.

In the league Velež finished a lowly 9th place, but their real shining moment came in the cup that season. Velež had beaten Borac Banja Luka in the first round 3–2, and after a walkover from Sutjeska Nikšić in the second round, advanced to the quarterfinals where they faced FK Bregalnica Štip, a lower league side from North Macedonia, and beat them 2–0. Velež beat Budućnost Podgorica 2–1 in the semi-final and ensured that they would be in the cup final for the first time in 23 years. Their opponents were Željezničar, who had finished 14th the same season. This tie resulted in the first and only ever all-Bosnian final in the Yugoslav Cup. Halilhodžić had signed a contract with French side FC Nantes and would leave Velež after the final, no matter the result, but the game was praised for being one of his finest hours for Velež. After joining Nantes he became one of their most iconic and legendary players and would go on to manage them in 2018. In the cup final, Dragan Okuka scored the winning goal with a header in the 80th minute, and Velež won their first ever major trophy, defeating Željezničar 3-2.

24 May 1981

Velež	3–2	Željezničar
Halilhodžić 55', 58'; Okuka 80'		Baždarević 36' (pen.), 62' (pen.)

Red Star Stadium, Belgrade
Attendance: 40,000
Referee: Milorad Vlajić (Belgrade)

As a result of winning they were admitted into the Cup Winners' Cup, and played their first game in Europe in 6 years. They also took part in the 1980–81 Balkans Cup, which they won 12–7 on aggregate against Trakia Plovdiv, later Botev Plovdiv. In the 1981–82 Cup Winners' Cup beat Jeunesse Esch 7–2 on aggregate in the first round and faced Lokomotiv Leipzig in the second, which they lost on penalties. The 1981–82 league season saw Velež finish 7th and Milutinović left for FK Partizan. Without him, Velež struggled and finished 13th, even with the efforts of Vladimir Skočajić (14 goals) and Dušan Bajević (11 goals). Bajević eventually became manager in 1984. In the 1984–85 season Velež finished 11th but the next season saw a huge improvement, with Velež finishing 3rd, their best season since 1973–74. This was largely due to the efforts of a new golden generation including goalkeeper Vukašin Petranović, defenders Nenad Bijedić and Vladimir Matijević, midfielder Vladimir Skočajić and forwards Predrag Jurić, Sead Kajtaz and Semir Tuce.

Velež had another good cup run in the 1985-86 Yugoslav Cup, first beating lower league Željezničar Doboj 1–5 away from home. Rad from Belgrade were beaten 2–0 but in the quarterfinals faced tough opponents Partizan. Velež fielded an upset winning 5–3 on penalties after the game ended 1–1 in normal time. In the semi-finals Velež faced yet another team from Belgrade, this time OFK Belgrade, which Velež beat 3–0 at home. In the final they were faced with Dinamo Zagreb, one of the big 4 teams in Yugoslavia led by famous coach Miroslav "Ćiro" Blažević. Nenad Bijedić scored a penalty in the sixth minute with an additional goal in the 51st minute. Marko Mlinarić of Dinamo quickly scored in the 58th minute, but the final score was settled after Predrag Jurić scored in the 87th minute. The performance of Velež was so good it caught the eye of the new Yugoslavia national team coach, Ivica Osim who was the manager of Željezničar during the 1981 cup final. Predrag Jurić was capped twice following the final and Semir Tuce was capped 7 times and scored 2 goals. Them and Meho Kodro, who was a youth prospect in 1986 would be the last players to play for the Yugoslavia national team while playing for Velež.

14 May 1986

Velež	3–1	Dinamo Zagreb
Bijedić 6' (pen.), 51'; P. Jurić 87'		Mlinarić 58'

Stadion JNA, Belgrade
Attendance: 40,000
Referee: Dušan Čolić (Belgrade)

Velež had a fantastic performance in the league that season as well, but it was marred by the final matchday. Velež lost 2–3 to OFK Belgrade at home and it was suspected that Velež, along with 13 other teams that day was suspected of match fixing. The claim for Velež's game was that Velež had confirmed themselves a place in the UEFA Cup next season (but played in the Cup Winners' Cup instead) but OFK needed a win to stay up. They were deducted 6 points the following season but come the end of the season the deduction would be overturned.

Velež got to participate in the Cup Winners' Cup again and beat Vasas SC in the first round with a 5–4 aggregate victory but lost versus Vitosha Sofia (later Levski Sofia) with the same aggregate. In the league Velež originally finished 3rd again however courts rejected that any matchfixing took place on the final day of the season. As charges were dropped Velež's 6-point deduction would be overturned and finished 2nd instead. This would be the last time Velež finished 2nd in the top flight.

Their UEFA Cup campaign began by disposing of Swiss club Sion 5–3 on aggregate in the first round. Their next opponent would be West German powerhouse Borussia Dortmund. Reinhard Saftig, Dortmund's coach at the time decided to watch Velež play live before the game. The game was a 5–0 victory over Red Star Belgrade which is still regarded as a memorable victory by many Velež fans. Velež ended up losing 2–0 away in the first leg however the second leg would be one of Velež's most famous victories. Meho Kodro and Predrag Jurić both scored goals, Semir Tuce missed a penalty, but Frank Mill scored for Dortmund and ended any chance of Velež going through, with Dortmund advancing 3–2 on aggregate despite losing 2-1 in the second leg. For the 1988–89 season Velež played their ever last season in a European competition (namely the UEFA Cup). They beat APOEL 6–2 on aggregate in the first round and Belenenses 4–3 on penalties after 0–0 on aggregate in the second round. In the third round they were faced with Heart of Midlothian. They lost 3–0 in the first leg away and couldn't overturn the deficit with a 2–1 win at home, ending 15 years and 6 seasons in European competitions. In the league Velež finished 11th, their worst position in 5 years. The 1988-89 Yugoslav Cup was also the last time Velež would appear in a cup final. Velež go on to beat lower league opposition in the early rounds including Sileks Kratovo, HNK Šibenik, Liria Prizren, and Rudar Ljubija (later Rudar Prijedor). In the final Velež were thoroughly beaten by Partizan Belgrade 6–1; Velež's sole goal came from Zijad Repak in the 65th minute.

10 May 1989

Partizan	6–1	Velež
Vučićević 30' (pen.), 34'; Milojević 52'; Vokrri 55'; Vermezović 58'; Batrović 79'		Repak 65'

Stadion JNA, Belgrade
Attendance: 35,000
Referee: Branko Bujić (Bar)

In 1989, Velež's youth team reached the final of the Yugoslav Youth Football Cup for the fourth time (after losing the final in 1969, 1977 and 1987) and won 4–1 versus FK Vardar with a team featuring Franjo Džidić, Slaven Musa and Sergej Barbarez. This would be the only piece of silverware ever won by Velež's youth team.

=== Velež in an independent Bosnia and Herzegovina (1992–present) ===
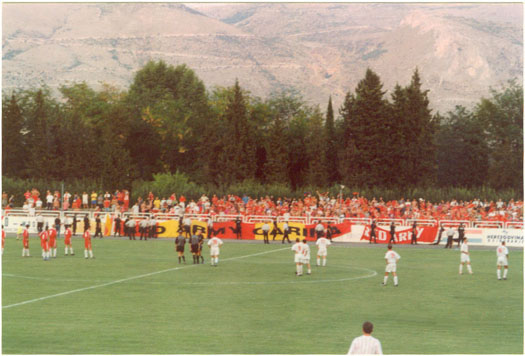
Image from 2000 featuring Red Army Mostar in the away stands versus Zrinjski in the Mostar derby

==== Rebuilding and instability (1992–2006) ====
On 15 March 1992, Velež would play their last ever game at the Bijeli Brijeg stadium; a 2–0 win versus FK Zemun. Shortly after the game the Siege of Mostar started, rendering football a dangerous and logistically impossible task. Velež were already on the way out of the Yugoslav First League due to Bosnia voting to leave Yugoslavia in an independence referendum at the beginning of the month, and to make matters worse due to Bosnia being independent, the ban on alleged fascist clubs was lifted, which led to Zrinjski being refounded in 1992. After the war, a new municipality within Mostar called Jugozapad (eng. Southwest) awarded the Bijeli Brijeg stadium to Zrinjski, which would lead to controversy for the next few years. Zrinjski had positioned themselves as a club specifically for Croats, which led to a large number of Velež's supporters abandoning them (Velež were a multiethnic club for all of their history, including players of Bosniak, Serb and Croat origin). Velež didn't play another game until 1994, when they were placed in the "Zenica Group" of the 1994–95 First League of Bosnia and Herzegovina, a wartime cuplike competition. Velež lost their first game 3–0 to Slaven Živinice and things didn't improve, they lost their next 2 games and exited the competition along with NK Đerzelez as the only 2 teams who lost all of their games.

For the 1995–96 season which transitioned football in Bosnia to a proper league system (albeit with three leagues competing on ethnic lines) all teams needed to compete on their own stadium. After friendlies in Sjeverni logor and Jablanica Velež chose Vrapčići, on the very outskirts of Mostar. The next few seasons would be rough as Velež finished 14th in 1995–96 and 10th in 1996–97 and 1997–98. For the last season mentioned a playoff system was introduced between the Bosniak and Croat clubs where the best of each league played against each other to determine a true champion in Bosnian football. In 1998–99 Velež pulled off a shock result by qualifying to the playoffs. To mark the occasion Velež demanded to play at the Bijeli Brijeg stadium, however after the Office of the High Representative (OHR) rejected the appeal, Velež and other teams boycotted the playoff for that season. Velež later qualified for the inaugural season of the Premier League of Bosnia and Herzegovina, the first post-war competition not based on ethnic lines where they finished 5th in their first season. The next season saw an 8th-place finish but the 2002–03 season saw a relegation into the second tier for the first time since 1952.

In the second tier Velež were a strong contender for promotion, first in the 2003–04 season, however a goal in injury time for Budućnost Banovići ensured that they would be promoted instead of Velež. In 2004–05 another title challenge was mounted but a 2–1 loss versus Rudar Kakanj made sure Jedinstvo Bihać would get promoted. In 2005–06 Velež were finally promoted, 14 points clear of second placed Rudar Kakanj.

==== Comeback and collapse (2006–2017) ====
For the next few seasons Velež would be a consistent midtable team in the Premier League with no major cup runs until the 2011–12 season, when Velež defeated Travnik 3–2 away in the first round and faced local rivals Zrinjski in the next round. The game originally ended 1–0 to Velež when Riad Demić scored in the 93rd minute which resulted in a pitch invasion from Zrinjski fans. This meant the game ended 3–0 to Velež and the Bijeli Brijeg stadium was suspended for 5 games. The second leg ended 2–0 to Velež and they would book themselves a place in the quarterfinals versus HNK Branitelj, which they won 3–1 on aggregate. As a result, Velež appeared in the cup semi-finals for the first time since 1998. They ended up losing 2–0 on aggregate to Široki Brijeg and Velež's best cup run in 15 years was over. In the 2013–14 season Velež finished in 5th place, 3 points away from European football, the highest since the leagues in Bosnia were reunified.

In June 2015, Velež were bought out by president of the Bosnian Social Democratic Party, Nermin Nikšić. Things quickly turned worse as the club failed to organize friendlies, pay player's wages, repeatedly fired coaches and fans got involved in brawls with opposing players. Velež ended the 2015–16 season in last place with only 9 points out of 30 games, which is one of the worst records in any top-flight league. The Nikšić board and subsequent emergency board was eventually replaced by a board led by Šemsudin Hasić, director of local pharmaceutical company Hercegovinalijek. That didn't mean the 2016–17 season started off easy. After 8 games Velež had not won a single game and were in 15th place out of 16 teams. The previous coach Avdo Kalajdžić was sacked and replaced with Ibrahim Rahimić, who had previously played for and coached Velež. Velež miraculously stayed up on the final day of the season and FK Goražde were relegated instead of them. Between seasons the stadium "Vrapčići" changed their name to "Stadion Rođeni" named after fans of Velež.

==== New comeback (2017–present) ====
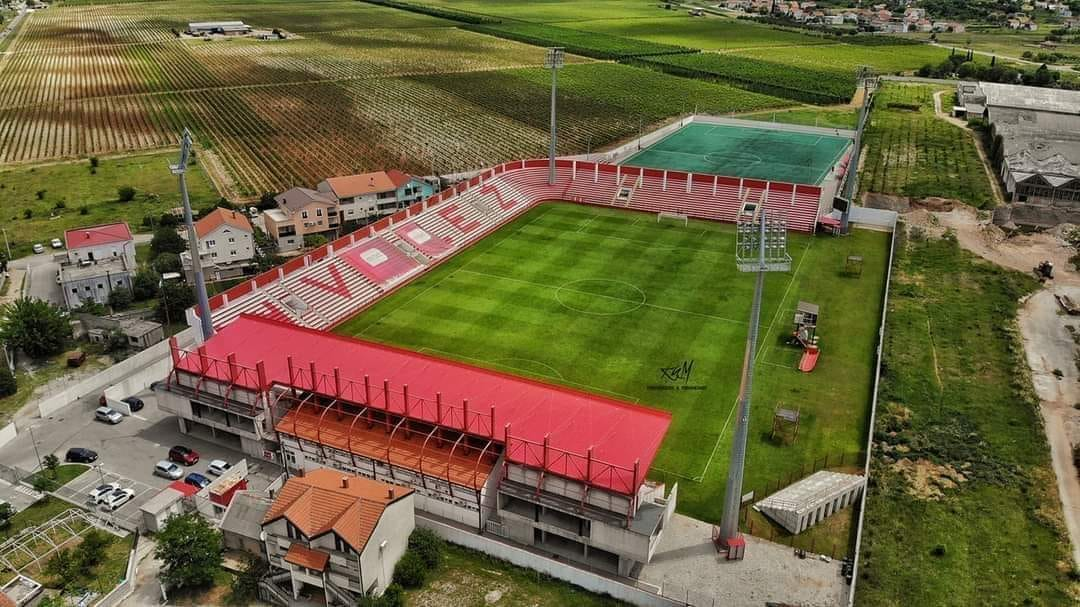
Stadion Rođeni, June 2021

For the 2017–18 season, thanks to new signings such as Elmir Kuduzović, Hamza Mešanović and Minel Doljančić, Velež wrapped up a 3rd place spot.

For the 2018–19 season, Velež signed many attackers like attacking midfielder Edo Vehabović, right winger Obren Cvijanović and striker Nusmir Fajić. The push to more attacking football worked as Velež went the whole first part of the season (15 games) unbeaten and Fajić himself scored 18 goals. Things turned sour after a controversial away game versus Goražde, where multiple refereeing errors lead to Goražde scoring the only goal of the game and Velež losing the unbeaten run record. Multiple former players including Velibor Pudar, Vahid Halilhodžić and Džemal Hadžiabdić expressed support for overturning the result but the FA adopted the original scoreline and 8.0 rating for the referees (7 or lower would mean suspension). Velež overcame this and won the First League 7 points ahead of their nearest rivals Olimpik, who were at one point only 1 point behind Velež. Velež also finished with a record 76 points and Nusmir Fajić scored a record 28 goals in one season. Another record broken that season was the final game played between Velež and Igman Konjic, a match that had an attendance of 7,000, one of the highest in the new stadium.

Velež's return to the top flight was not as glamorous as anticipated as they lost their first three games to Mladost Doboj Kakanj, Zrinjski and Čelik Zenica. Rahimić resigned and Feđa Dudić was chosen as the next manager. His first game featured the debut of Macedonian centre-back Kosta Manev, who was cited as one of Velež's best players that season. Dudić's first game as manager was a 0–0 draw against Sloboda Tuzla and Velež picked up its first point in the season. Velež picked up several wins against teams like Široki Brijeg, Željezničar, Borac Banja Luka and Zrinjski in the rematch later that season. The season would ultimately be abandoned after 22 of the planned 33 games had been played due to the ongoing COVID-19 pandemic in Bosnia and Herzegovina. However, the following season saw Velež's fortune turn with a return to European competition, finishing 3rd in the league and qualifying for the first iteration of the UEFA Europa Conference League. In the Conference League qualifying rounds, Velež eliminated semi-professional Northern Irish club Coleraine and Greek giants AEK Athens, before themselves getting eliminated by Swedish side IF Elfsborg in the third qualifying round. In the 2021–22 season, Velež won the first Bosnian Cup title in their history, after a penalty shoot-out, following a 0–0 draw against Sarajevo.

Following Feđa Dudić leaving Velež at the end of the 2021–22 season, the club appointed Amar Osim, one of the most successful Bosnian football managers, as its new manager on 11 June 2022.

=== Mostar February Tournament ===
In 1965, to commemorate 20 years of the liberation of Mostar by Yugoslav partisans, a football tournament was organized by Velež and the city's government at the Bijeli Brijeg stadium. It was held every year from 1965 and 1992, ending due to the outbreak of the Bosnian War and Velež no longer being able to play on the Bijeli Brijeg stadium. The tournament was revived in 2023 with U-19 youth teams, but the organizers said they hope to return to senior teams as soon as possible.

The tournament featured many notable club and national teams, the latter of which included Poland and the Soviet Union. Velež has won 16 editions of the February Tournament, 15 of which with their senior team. That is more than all other winning teams combined. In addition to this, Velež's own Dušan Bajević holds the record for most appearances, as well as most goals in the tournament.

== Sponsorship ==
On 12 October 2021, Velež signed a five-year sponsorship deal with the company Mozzart BH Play. At the time of signing, it was the club's second-largest sponsor.

In 2023, AgroHerc Organic, an organic agriculture and cosmetics producer, based in Mostar, became the club's partner and jersey sponsor with its brand Narentas.

By solemnly signing a contract with the German sports equipment manufacturer Puma, Velež turned a new page in its history on 8 July, 2024. At a gala dinner in Mostar, Velež and Puma signed a significant partnership, after which the jerseys for the new season were officially presented.

Period	Kit Manufacturer	Shirt Sponsor	Sleeve Sponsor
2024–present	Puma	Narentas	Mozzart

== Stadium ==
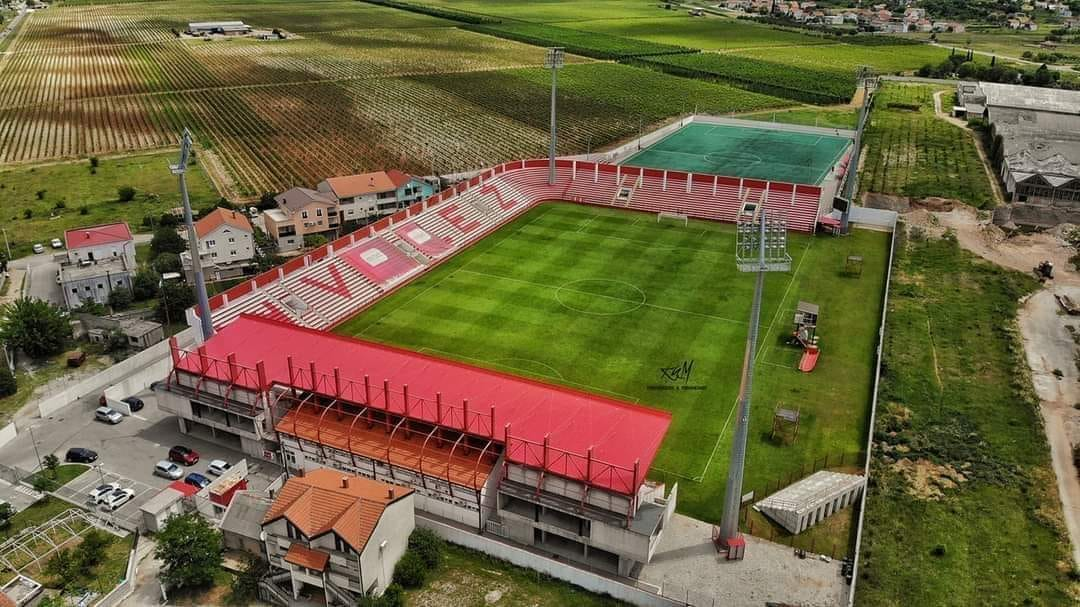
Stadion Rođeni in 2021

Following their forced displacement from the historic Stadion pod Bijelim Brijegom during the Bosnian War in 1992, Velež established a new home ground in the Vrapčići suburb, playing their first official match at the site on 25 November 1995. Initially known as Stadion Vrapčići, the ground was gradually built up from a basic local pitch into a permanent football facility.

The club's long-term future at the site was legally secured on the 12th of October 2012 when the City Council of Mostar granted Velež a 40-year lease to utilize the complete stadium complex free of charge. This major administrative upgrade expanded the club's control beyond the initial 8,000 square meter playing field, incorporating all newly constructed stands and auxiliary training grounds. This secure, multi-decade arrangement provided the institutional framework necessary for Velež to meet stringent UEFA stadium licensing criteria and legally pursue major modern capital investments, including the hybrid pitch and the southern stand expansion.

In 2017, the venue was officially renamed Stadion Rođeni in honor of the club's iconic nickname.

== Rivalry ==
FK Velež's main rival is HŠK Zrinjski Mostar, the other team from Mostar. The match between the two Mostar teams is called the Mostar derby. The first match between Velež Mostar and Zrinjski was played during the 1920s, but when Zrinjski was banned (from 1945 to 1992) for playing in the fascist league during World War II, the rivalry stopped. During Velež's glory days in the Yugoslav First League, they were the only major club from Mostar and were supported by all people from the city of Mostar. After the war Zrinjski was reformed, and they became a symbol of the Croatian side of Mostar (west side) and Velež become a symbol of the Bosniak side (east side). On 1 March 2000, Zrinjski and Velež played a friendly game, for the first time after Zrinjski was reformed. The game was played in Sarajevo and the result was a 2–2 draw. The first official league game was played on 18 August 2000 at the Bijeli Brijeg Stadium. Zrinjski won 2–0.

The rivalry is both local and ethnic. FK Velež and their fans, called Red Army are predominantly Bosniaks, while Zrinjski and their fans called Ultras are Croats. Making the rivalry bigger is the fact that Zrinjski stadium was Velež's stadium during their glory days in Yugoslavia, but because of the war, Velež was forced to move from their stadium, which was located in the western part of Mostar, and build a new stadium on the other side of the city.

== Supporters ==
Velež supporters are famous for their loyalty and passion, and they follow their club wherever it plays. There are few groups of Velež supporters. The most famous are Red Army Mostar and Mostarski Rođeni.

=== Club songs ===
The official anthem of FK Velež Mostar is Rođeni, rođeni (Rođeni, Rođeni) by Željko Samardžić. The text was written by Milenko Mišo Marić. The music was composed by Kemal Monteno. The first demo recording was done after the Marshall Tito Yugoslav Cup final in 1981 against Željezničar. For the first time, the official club anthem was played before the final of the Marshall Tito Yugoslav Cup in 1986 against Dinamo Zagreb. It was also played live at the Bijeli Brijeg Stadium by Željko Samardžić in 1987 before the UEFA Cup game against Borussia Dortmund. The official anthem of the club's ultras group Red Army Mostar is Ili grmi il' se zemlja trese (Ili grmi il' se zemlja trese) by MO Selection Band. Later, a band called Red Army Band recorded seven songs that quickly became popular among Velež fans. Other artists did the same too, so today there are a lot of recorded songs about the red club from Mostar.

== Honours ==
Chart showing Velež's performance in domestic football since entering the top flight

=== Domestic ===
==== League ====
- First League of the Federation of Bosnia and Herzegovina:
  - Winners (2): 2005–06, 2018–19
  - Runners-up (2): 2003–04, 2004–05
- Yugoslav First League:
  - Runners-up (3): 1972–73, 1973–74, 1986–87
  - Third place (4): 1965–66, 1969–70, 1985–86, 1987–88
- Yugoslav Second League:
  - Winners (2): 1952, 1954–55

==== Cups ====
- Bosnia and Herzegovina Cup:
  - Winners (1): 2021–22
  - Runners-up (2): 2022–23, 2025–26
- Yugoslav Cup:
  - Winners (2): 1980–81, 1985–86
  - Runners-up (2): 1957–58, 1988–89

=== European ===
- UEFA Cup:
  - Quarter-finals (1): 1974–75
- Mitropa Cup:
  - Runners-up (1): 1975–76
- Balkans Cup:
  - Winners (1): 1980–81

== Recent seasons ==
Season	League									Cup	Europe		Top league goalscorer	
Season	Division	P	W	D	L	F	A	Pts	Pos	Cup	Europe		Player	Goals
2016–17	First League of FBiH	30	11	10	9	39	33	43	11th	R16			Brandao	8
2017–18	First League of FBiH	30	15	10	5	49	23	55	3rd	R32			Brandao	9
2018–19	First League of FBiH	30	24	4	2	78	18	76	1st	R32			Nusmir Fajić	28
2019–20	Premier League	22	9	5	8	25	23	32	8th	R16			Brandao	10
2020–21	Premier League	33	16	13	4	50	30	61	3rd	R16			Obren Cvijanović	11
2021–22	Premier League	33	13	8	12	42	37	44	5th	W	Europa Conference League	QR3	Dženan Zajmović	9
2022–23	Premier League	33	11	12	10	40	37	45	6th	RU	Europa Conference League	QR2	Nermin Haskić	12
2023–24	Premier League	33	16	11	6	50	28	59	3rd	QF			Nermin Haskić	12
2024–25	Premier League	33	10	12	11	45	39	42	7th	QF	Conference League	QR1	Mihael Mlinarić	19
2025–26	Premier League	36	14	9	13	36	35	51	4th	RU			Ivan Šarić	6

== European record ==
Since the late 1970s up until the Bosnian War of 1992–1995, Velež has been consistently ranked on the UEFA Team Rankings. While the club has often reached ranks of top 100–200 teams, on some occasions the UEFA has ranked Velež among the top 100 teams. In 1989 Velež was ranked at the 43rd place on the UEFA Team Ranking List which also marks the highest UEFA ranking achieved by any football club from Bosnia and Herzegovina.

- In 1988, Velež was ranked 88th on the UEFA's Team Ranking List, ahead of clubs like Everton (ranked 100), Olympique Marseille (ranked 115), Espanyol (ranked 121), Napoli (ranked 125), Young Boys (ranked 126), Dinamo Zagreb and Borussia Dortmund (ranked 158), Aston Villa (ranked 200) and many others, as cited in the UEFA Team Ranking database for 1988.
- In 1989, Velež was ranked 43rd on the UEFA's Team Ranking List, ahead of clubs like Hamburger SV (ranked 45), AC Milan (ranked 51), CSKA Sofia (ranked 57), Napoli (ranked 62), Dinamo Moscow (ranked 67), AS Roma (ranked 74), Real Sociedad (ranked 80), AEK Athens (ranked 105), FC Nantes (ranked 121), Manchester United (ranked 126), Tottenham Hotspur (ranked 141), Paris Saint-Germain (143), Dinamo Zagreb (195) and many others, as cited in the UEFA Team Ranking database for 1989.
  - The above record is the highest UEFA ranking achieved by any football club from Bosnia and Herzegovina.
- In 1990, Velež was ranked 51st on the UEFA's Team Ranking List, ahead of clubs like VfB Stuttgart (ranked 55), Hamburger SV (ranked 56), AS Monaco (ranked 60), AEK Athens (ranked 73), Real Sociedad (ranked 79), Levski Sofia (ranked 92), Borussia Dortmund (ranked 94), Lech Poznan (ranked 100), Paris Saint Germain (ranked 139), Dinamo Zagreb (192) and many others, as cited in the UEFA Team Ranking database for 1990.
- In 1991, Velež was ranked 53rd on the UEFA's Team Ranking List, ahead of clubs like AS Roma (ranked 55), AS Monaco (ranked 57), Fiorentina (ranked 80), Valencia (ranked 86), Manchester United (ranked 92), Young Boys (ranked 103), Dinamo Zagreb (105), Espanyol (ranked 111), Sevilla (ranked 147), Sturm Graz (ranked 206) and many others, as cited in the UEFA Team Ranking database for 1991.
- In 1992, when the war started and when Mostar was being bombed and under siege, Velež was even then still ranked 81st club on the UEFA's Team Ranking List, still ahead of clubs like Dinamo Moscow (ranked 85), Torino (ranked 99), Espanyol (ranked 107), Aston Villa (ranked 111), Sevilla (ranked 147) and many others, as cited in the UEFA Team Ranking database for 1992.

=== Summary ===
As of 30 July 2026

(This summary does not include matches played in the Inter-Cities Fairs Cup, which was not endorsed by UEFA and is not counted in UEFA's official European statistics.)

Competition	Pld	W	D	L	GF	GA	LSP
UEFA Cup	20	9	4	7	29	27	1988–89
UEFA Conference League	14	4	3	7	12	22	2026–27
UEFA Cup Winners' Cup	8	3	4	1	18	13	1986–87
Total	42	16	11	15	59	62	—

Pld = Matches played; W = Matches won; D = Matches drawn; L = Matches lost; GF = Goals for; GA = Goals against; LSP = Last season played

=== By season ===
(Velež score always listed first. Source:)

Season	Competition	Round	Opponent	Home	Away	Agg.
1960	Mitropa Cup	N/A	(Italy) Alessandria	4–1	2–1	6–2
1962–63	Intertoto Cup	GS	(West Germany) Hildesheim	9–1	2–0	3rd
1962–63	Intertoto Cup	GS	(Hungary) Dózsa	1–2	1–4	3rd
1962–63	Intertoto Cup	GS	(Netherlands) Blauw-Wit	1–1	2–3	3rd
1963–64	Intertoto Cup	GS	(Czechoslovakia) Slovnaft Bratislava	1–1	1–6	2nd
1963–64	Intertoto Cup	GS	(Poland) Zagłębie Sosnowiec	4–1	1–4	2nd
1963–64	Intertoto Cup	GS	(East Germany) Motor Jena	1–0	1–0	2nd
1973–74	UEFA Cup	R1	(Czechoslovakia) Tatran Prešov	1–1	2–4	3–5
1974–75	UEFA Cup	R1	(Soviet Union) Spartak Moscow	2–0	1–3	3–3 (a)
1974–75	UEFA Cup	R2	(Austria) Rapid Wien	1–0	1–1	2–1
1974–75	UEFA Cup	R3	(England) Derby County	4–1	1–3	5–4
1974–75	UEFA Cup	QF	(Netherlands) Twente	1–0	0–2	1–2
1975–76	Mitropa Cup	GS	(Italy) Perugia	0–0	4–2	1st
1975–76	Mitropa Cup	GS	Austria WAC Wien	2–0	1–2	1st
1975–76	Mitropa Cup	Final	(Austria) Wacker Innsbruck	1–3	1–3	2–6
1980–81	Balkans Cup	GS	(Greece) AEK Athens	2–0	1–3	1st
1980–81	Balkans Cup	GS	(Albania) Flamurtari	4–1	1–2	1st
1980–81	Balkans Cup	Final	(Bulgaria) Trakia Plovdiv	6–2	6–5	12–7
1981–82	Cup Winners' Cup	R1	(Luxembourg) Jeunesse Esch	6–1	1–1	7–2
1981–82	Cup Winners' Cup	R2	(East Germany) Lokomotive Leipzig	1–1	1–1	2–2 (1–4 p)
1986–87	Cup Winners' Cup	R1	(Hungary) Vasas	3–2	2–2	5–4
1986–87	Cup Winners' Cup	R2	(Bulgaria) Vitosha Sofia	4–3	0–2	4–5
1987–88	UEFA Cup	R1	(Switzerland) Sion	5–0	0–3	5–3
1987–88	UEFA Cup	R2	(West Germany) Borussia Dortmund	2–1	0–2	2–3
1988–89	UEFA Cup	R1	(Cyprus) APOEL	1–0	5–2	6–2
1988–89	UEFA Cup	R2	(Portugal) Belenenses	0–0	0–0	0–0 (4–3 p)
1988–89	UEFA Cup	R3	(Scotland) Hearts	2–1	0–3	2–4
2021–22	Conference League	QR1	(Northern Ireland) Coleraine	2–1	2–1	4–2
2021–22	Conference League	QR2	(Greece) AEK Athens	2–1	0–1	2–2 (3–2 p)
2021–22	Conference League	QR3	(Sweden) IF Elfsborg	1–4	1–1	2–5
2022–23	Conference League	QR2	(Malta) Ħamrun Spartans	0–1	0–1	0–2
2024–25	Conference League	QR1	(Andorra) Inter Club d'Escaldes	1–1	1–5	2–6
2026–27	Conference League	QR1	(Moldova) Milsami Orhei	1–1	1–0	2–1
2026–27	Conference League	QR2	(Slovakia) DAC Dunajská Streda	0–3	0–1	0–4

=== Key achievements ===
Season	Achievement	Notes
UEFA Cup
1974–75	Quarter-finals	eliminated by (Netherlands) Twente 1–0 in Mostar, 0–2 in Enschede

=== Player records ===
- Most appearances in UEFA club competitions: 14 appearances:
  - Vukašin Petranović
  - Mili Hadžiabdić
  - Vladimir Gudelj
- Top scorer in UEFA club competitions: 10 goals – Semir Tuce

== Players ==
=== Current squad ===
As of 7 October 2026

Note: Flags indicate national team as defined under FIFA eligibility rules; some limited exceptions apply. Players may hold more than one non-FIFA nationality.

No.	Pos.	Nation	Player
1	GK	BIH	Faris Ribić
5	DF	COM	Mohamed Abdallah
6	MF	COM	Rafidine Abdullah
7	DF	BIH	Ajdin Nukić
8	MF	BIH	Ante Hrkać (captain)
10	MF	BIH	Đani Salčin
11	FW	BIH	Aldin Mešić
13	DF	AUT	Anes Omerovic
14	FW	BIH	Beni Redžić
17	MF	PLE	Ayham Shhade
18	DF	BIH	Said Duranović
19	FW	BIH	Mahir Rahimić
20	MF	BIH	Damir Halilović
22	GK	BIH	Elmin Matardžić
23	DF	BIH	Armin Imamović
24	FW	BIH	Faris Dževahirić
28	FW	BIH	Almir Aganspahić

No.	Pos.	Nation	Player
32	FW	BIH	Benjamin Tatar
38	MF	BIH	Dženan Puce
44	MF	BIH	Eldar Mehmedović
45	MF	BIH	Kenan Đuliman
47	FW	BIH	Vedad Abidović
49	MF	SRB	Birsen Leković
55	DF	BIH	Adin Bajrić
66	DF	BIH	Faruk Šetić
77	MF	BIH	Armin Bešagić
80	FW	CRO	Nino Stojanović
83	MF	BIH	Mahir Bešić
88	FW	MKD	Leonid Ignatov
91	FW	CRO	Carlo Mateković
92	DF	BIH	Benjamin Zulović
95	GK	SLO	Emil Velić
—	DF	CRO	Nino Vukasović
—	FW	SWE	Moonga Simba

== Club officials ==
=== Technical staff ===
As of 15 September 2026

Position	Nat.	Staff
Head coach	(Croatia)	Damir Milanović
Assistant coach	(Serbia)	Marko Đorđević
Assistant coach	(Bosnia and Herzegovina)	Vedran Pelić
Goalkeeping coach	(Bosnia and Herzegovina)	Benjamin Tipura
Fitness coach	(Croatia)	Tomislav Jurković
Video analyst	(Bosnia and Herzegovina)	Enej Bruck
Scout	(Bosnia and Herzegovina)	Denis Zvonić
Doctor	(Bosnia and Herzegovina)	Adnan Konjhodžić
Doctor	(Bosnia and Herzegovina)	Nizar Zidan
Physiotherapist	(Bosnia and Herzegovina)	Anel Husnić
Physiotherapist	(Bosnia and Herzegovina)	Adnan Rudan
Kit manager	(Bosnia and Herzegovina)	Šaćir Šabanović
Club representative	(Bosnia and Herzegovina)	Veselin Đurasović

=== Club management ===
As of 10 September 2026

Role	Nat.	Name
President	(Bosnia and Herzegovina)	Admir Rahimić
Vice president	(Bosnia and Herzegovina)	Anel Demić
Chairman of the Assembly	(Bosnia and Herzegovina)	Samir Sunagić
Chairman of the Disciplinary Board	(Bosnia and Herzegovina)	Anel Droce
Director	(Bosnia and Herzegovina)	Faruk Karadža
Sporting director	—	Vacant
Youth School director	(Bosnia and Herzegovina)	Emir Tufek
Club secretary	(Bosnia and Herzegovina)	Fazlija Puzić

== Managerial history ==
Nat.	Manager	Tenure
(Socialist Federal Republic of Yugoslavia)	Bernard Hügl	1953–55
(Socialist Federal Republic of Yugoslavia)	Ratomir Čabrić	1955–59
(Socialist Federal Republic of Yugoslavia)	Gustav Lechner	1959–60
(Socialist Federal Republic of Yugoslavia)	Ratomir Čabrić	1960–61
(Socialist Federal Republic of Yugoslavia)	Haldun Hrvić	1961–64
(Socialist Federal Republic of Yugoslavia)	Dragoslav Filipović	1964–65
(Socialist Federal Republic of Yugoslavia)	Domagoj Kapetanović	1965–66
(Socialist Federal Republic of Yugoslavia)	Mirko Kokotović	1966–67
(Socialist Federal Republic of Yugoslavia)	Haldun Hrvić	1967–68
(Socialist Federal Republic of Yugoslavia)	Sulejman Rebac	1968–76
(Socialist Federal Republic of Yugoslavia)	Muhamed Mujić	1976–77
(Socialist Federal Republic of Yugoslavia)	Vukašin Višnjevac	1977–80
(Socialist Federal Republic of Yugoslavia)	Miloš Milutinović	1980–82
(Socialist Federal Republic of Yugoslavia)	Muhamed Mujić	1982–83
(Socialist Federal Republic of Yugoslavia)	Dušan Bajević	1983–87
(Socialist Federal Republic of Yugoslavia)	Žarko Barbarić	1988–89
(Socialist Federal Republic of Yugoslavia)	Salem Halilhodžić	1989–90
(Socialist Federal Republic of Yugoslavia)	Enver Marić	1990
(Socialist Federal Republic of Yugoslavia)	Franjo Džidić	1990–92
(Bosnia and Herzegovina)	Zejnil Selimotić	1994–96
(Bosnia and Herzegovina)	Zijad Tojaga (interim)	1996
(Bosnia and Herzegovina)	Sedin Tanović	1996–98
(Bosnia and Herzegovina)	Avdo Kalajdžić	1998–00
(Bosnia and Herzegovina)	Kemal Hafizović	2002–03
(Bosnia and Herzegovina)	Avdo Kalajdžić	2003
(Bosnia and Herzegovina)	Husnija Arapović	2003–05
(Bosnia and Herzegovina)	Kemal Hafizović	2005
(Bosnia and Herzegovina)	Milomir Šešlija	2005–07
(Bosnia and Herzegovina)	Anel Karabeg	2007–08

Nat.	Manager	Tenure
(Bosnia and Herzegovina)	Emir Tufek	2008
(Bosnia and Herzegovina)	Abdulah Ibraković	2008–10
(Bosnia and Herzegovina)	Veselin Đurasović (interim)	2010
(Bosnia and Herzegovina)	Demir Hotić	2010
(Bosnia and Herzegovina)	Enes Spahić (interim)	2010
(Bosnia and Herzegovina)	Milomir Odović	2011
(Bosnia and Herzegovina)	Mirza Varešanović	2011–12
(Bosnia and Herzegovina)	Adnan Dizdarević (interim)	2012
(Bosnia and Herzegovina)	Asmir Džafić	2012
(Bosnia and Herzegovina)	Ibrahim Rahimić	2012–13
(Bosnia and Herzegovina)	Nedim Jusufbegović	2013–15
(Bosnia and Herzegovina)	Dželaludin Muharemović	2015
(Bosnia and Herzegovina)	Adis Obad (interim)	2015
(Bosnia and Herzegovina)	Dženan Zaimović (interim)	2015
(North Macedonia)	Dragi Kanatlarovski	2015
(Bosnia and Herzegovina)	Dženan Zaimović (interim)	2015
(Bosnia and Herzegovina)	Zijad Tojaga	2015–16
(Bosnia and Herzegovina)	Avdo Kalajdžić	2016
(Bosnia and Herzegovina)	Ibrahim Rahimić	2016–19
(Bosnia and Herzegovina)	Feđa Dudić	2019–22
(Bosnia and Herzegovina)	Amar Osim	2022
(Bosnia and Herzegovina)	Nedim Jusufbegović	2022–23
(Croatia)	Dean Klafurić	2023–24
(Austria)	Damir Čanadi	2024
(Turkey)	İrfan Buz	2024–25
(Serbia)	Vladimir Janković	2025
(Croatia)	Goran Sablić	2025
(Bosnia and Herzegovina)	Ibrahim Rahimić	2025–26
(Croatia)	Damir Milanović	2026–present
