= 1980–81 Yugoslav Cup =

1980–81 Yugoslav Football Cup
33rd Marshal Tito Cup

Tournament details
- Country: Yugoslavia

Final positions
- Champions: Velež (1st title)
- Runners-up: Željezničar
- Cup Winners' Cup: Velež

Tournament statistics
- Matches played: 31
- Goals scored: 84 (2.71 per match)
- Top goal scorer: Vahid Halilhodžić (6)

The 1980–81 Yugoslav Cup (Serbian: Куп Југославије; Croatian: Kup Jugoslavije; Slovene: Pokal Jugoslavije, Macedonian: Куп на Југославија); also known as "Marshal Tito Cup" (Kup Maršala Tita); was the 33rd season of the top association football knockout competition in Yugoslavia since its establishment in 1946.

The defending 1979–80 cup winners Dinamo Zagreb failed to retain the trophy as they were knocked out in the second round (i.e. round of 16) by Radnički Niš. Herzegovina side Velež from Mostar and Bosnian side Željezničar from Sarajevo reached the tournament final, in what would become the only cup final contested by two clubs from SR Bosnia and Herzegovina in the history of the competition which ran from 1946 to 1992.

In the final match, played at the neutral ground of Red Star Stadium in Belgrade, Velež, led by coach Miloš Milutinović, won the cup by beating Ivica Osim's Željezničar 3–2 with Vahid Halilhodžić scoring a brace and Dragan Okuka adding a decisive third goal in the 80th minute. This was Velež's first cup win in only their second appearance in the final, the first one taking place 23 years earlier in 1957–58.

Surprise of the tournament were third level sides Bregalnica Štip and Orijent (hailing from SR Macedonia and SR Croatia respectively) who sensationally managed to reach the quarter-finals. Bregalnica were eventually knocked out by cup winners Velež, while Orijent lost their quarter-final tie on penalties after holding the Montenegrin side Budućnost Titograd to a goalless draw. Budućnost themselves had an unusually good run, reaching the semi-finals and eliminating two of the Yugoslav "Big Four" clubs in the process, Hajduk Split and Red Star.

== Calendar ==
The Yugoslav Cup was a tournament for which clubs from all tiers of the football pyramid were eligible to enter. In addition, amateur teams put together by individual Yugoslav People's Army garrisons and various factories and industrial plants were also encouraged to enter, which meant that each cup edition could have several thousands of teams in its preliminary stages. These teams would play through a number of qualifying rounds before reaching the first round proper, in which they would be paired with top-flight teams.

The cup final was played on Sunday, 24 May, traditionally scheduled to coincide with Youth Day celebrated on 25 May, a national holiday in Yugoslavia which also doubled as the official commemoration of Josip Broz Tito's birthday.

Round	Legs	Date	Fixtures	Clubs
First round (round of 32)	Single	15 October 1980	16	32 → 16
Second round (round of 16)	Single	19 November 1980	8	16 → 8
Quarter-finals	Single	22 February 1981	4	8 → 4
Semi-finals	Single	1 April 1981	2	4 → 2
Final	Single	24 May 1981	1	2 → 1

== First round ==
First round proper was played on 15 October 1980. As in all stages until the final, ties were decided over a single leg, with penalty shootouts used to determine winners when matches ended in a draw after regular time. All eighteen 1980–81 Yugoslav First League clubs entered the competition at this stage, along with fourteen lower-tier teams.

Seven top-level clubs were knocked out at this stage: Borac Banja Luka, Hajduk Split, Rijeka, Sarajevo, Vardar, Vojvodina, and NK Zagreb.

In the following tables winning teams are marked in bold; teams from outside top level are marked in italic script.

Tie no	Home team	Score	Away team
1	**Bregalnica Štip**	1–0	Šumadija
2	**Budućnost**	4–0	Hajduk Split
3	Čelik	1–2	**Sutjeska**
4	**Red Star**	4–1	Osijek
5	**Dinamo Vinkovci**	2–1	Vardar
6	**Dinamo Zagreb**	2–1	Vojvodina
7	**Napredak Kruševac**	2–1	Sarajevo
8	NK Zagreb	1–2	**Orijent**
9	**Olimpija**	2–1	Jedinstvo Bihać
10	**Partizan**	2–2 (6–4 p)	Rijeka
11	Prishtina	1–2	**OFK Belgrade**
12	**Radnički Niš**	2–0	Borac Čapljina
13	Rudar Titovo Velenje	1–2	**Željezničar**
14	**Sloboda Titovo Užice**	1–1 (4–1 p)	Proleter
15	**Sloboda Tuzla**	5–0	Dinamo Pančevo
16	**Velež**	3–2	Borac Banja Luka

== Second round ==
Second round proper was played on 19 November 1980. This round was marked by cup holders Dinamo Zagreb's exit following their 2–1 defeat to Radnički Niš, and the two third level minnows Bregalnica and Orijent who both knocked out top flight opponents. The tie between Sutjeska and Velež was awarded 3–0 to Velež.

Tie no	Home team	Score	Away team
1	Bregalnica Štip	1–0	Olimpija Ljubljana
2	Budućnost	2–1	Red Star Belgrade
3	Orijent	1–0	OFK Belgrade
4	Partizan	5–0	Napredak Kruševac
5	Radnički Niš	2–1	Dinamo Zagreb
6	Sloboda Tuzla	3–0	Dinamo Vinkovci
7	Sutjeska	0–3 (w/o)	Velež
8	Željezničar	1–0	Sloboda Titovo Užice

== Quarter-finals ==
Quarter-final matches were played on 22 February 1981.

Tie no	Home team	Score	Away team
1	Orijent	0–0 (2–4 p)	Budućnost
2	Partizan	2–0	Sloboda Tuzla
3	Velež	2–0	Bregalnica Štip
4	Željezničar	1–0	Radnički Niš

== Semi-finals ==
Semi-final matches were played on 1 April 1981.

Tie no	Home team	Score	Away team
1	Velež	2–1	Budućnost
2	Željezničar	2–0	Partizan

== Final ==
24 May 1981

Velež	3–2	Željezničar
Halilhodžić 55', 58'; Okuka 80'		Baždarević 36' (pen.), 62' (pen.)

Red Star Stadium, Belgrade
Attendance: 40,000
Referee: Milorad Vlajić (Belgrade)

Velež	Željezničar

GK	1	(Socialist Federal Republic of Yugoslavia) Enver Marić
MF	2	(Socialist Federal Republic of Yugoslavia) Avdo Kalajdžić
DF	3	(Socialist Federal Republic of Yugoslavia) Aleksandar Mičić	Substituted off
DF	4	(Socialist Federal Republic of Yugoslavia) Dubravko Ledić
DF	5	(Socialist Federal Republic of Yugoslavia) Vladimir Matijević (c)
DF	6	(Socialist Federal Republic of Yugoslavia) Veselin Đurasović
FW	7	(Socialist Federal Republic of Yugoslavia) Dragan Okuka
MF	8	(Socialist Federal Republic of Yugoslavia) Blaž Slišković
FW	9	(Socialist Federal Republic of Yugoslavia) Vahid Halilhodžić
MF	10	(Socialist Federal Republic of Yugoslavia) Adnan Međedović
FW	11	(Socialist Federal Republic of Yugoslavia) Vladimir Skočajić	Substituted off
Substitutes:
MF	?	(Socialist Federal Republic of Yugoslavia) Anel Karabeg	Substituted on
MF	?	(Socialist Federal Republic of Yugoslavia) Momčilo Vukoje	Substituted on
MF	?	(Socialist Federal Republic of Yugoslavia) Mirsad Mulahasanović	Substituted on
Manager:
(Socialist Federal Republic of Yugoslavia) Miloš Milutinović

GK	1	(Socialist Federal Republic of Yugoslavia) Slavko Njeguš
MF	2	(Socialist Federal Republic of Yugoslavia) Branislav Berjan
FW	3	(Socialist Federal Republic of Yugoslavia) Vlado Komšić
DF	4	(Socialist Federal Republic of Yugoslavia) Ivan Lušić
DF	5	(Socialist Federal Republic of Yugoslavia) Hajrudin Saračević
DF	6	(Socialist Federal Republic of Yugoslavia) Josip Čilić
DF	7	(Socialist Federal Republic of Yugoslavia) Edin Bahtić
MF	8	(Socialist Federal Republic of Yugoslavia) Milomir Odović	Substituted off
MF	9	(Socialist Federal Republic of Yugoslavia) Rade Paprica
FW	10	(Socialist Federal Republic of Yugoslavia) Mehmed Baždarević (c)
FW	11	(Socialist Federal Republic of Yugoslavia) Nikola Nikić	Substituted off
Substitutes:
MF	?	(Socialist Federal Republic of Yugoslavia) Dragomir Vlaški	Substituted on
MF	?	(Socialist Federal Republic of Yugoslavia) Anto Grabo	Substituted on
Manager:
(Socialist Federal Republic of Yugoslavia) Ivica Osim

== See also ==
- 1980–81 Yugoslav First League
- 1980–81 Yugoslav Second League
