= Jovan Ćurčić =

Serbian footballer

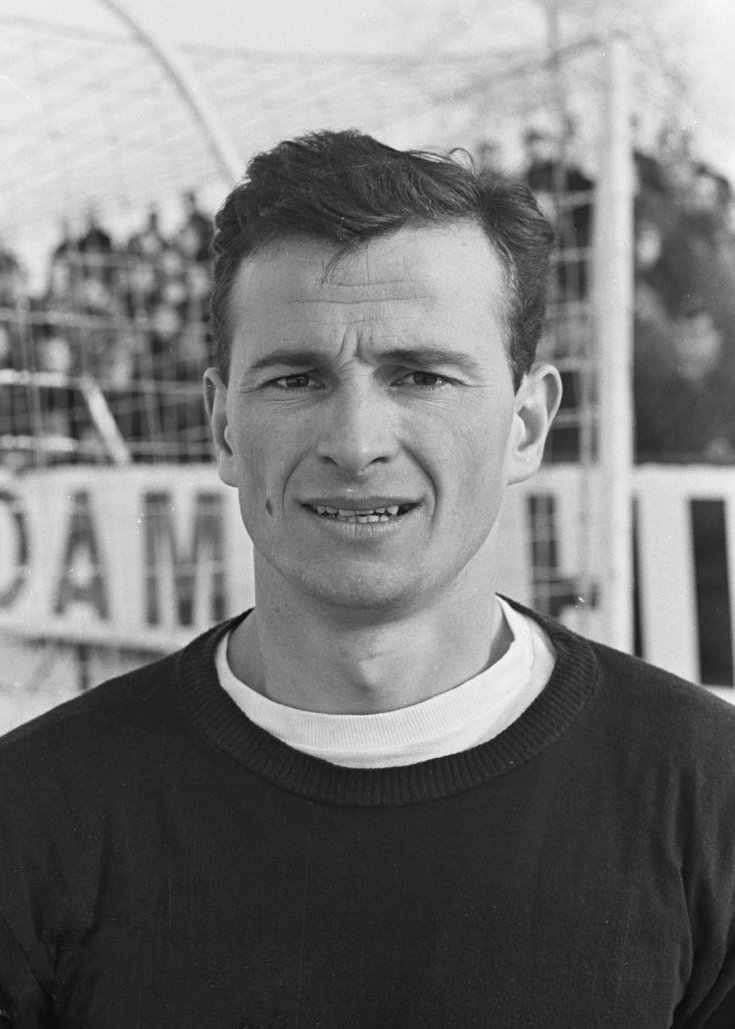
- Ćurčić in 1967

Personal information
- Date of birth: 4 May 1941 (age 85)
- Place of birth: Čačak, German-occupied Serbia
- Position: Goalkeeper

Senior career*
Years	Team	Apps	(Gls)
1959–1965	Partizan	92	(0)
1965–1966	Borussia Mönchengladbach		
1966–1967	UVS Leiden		
1967–1976	FC Liège	131	(0)
1976–1977	Patro Eisden		
- * Club domestic league appearances and goals

Jovan Ćurčić (Serbian Cyrillic: Јован Ћурчић; born 4 May 1941) is a Serbian retired footballer.

He played 256 matches for Belgian side FC Liège.

== Honours ==
Partizan

- Yugoslav First League: 1960–61, 1961–62, 1962–63, 1964–65
