= 2007–08 Serbian Cup =

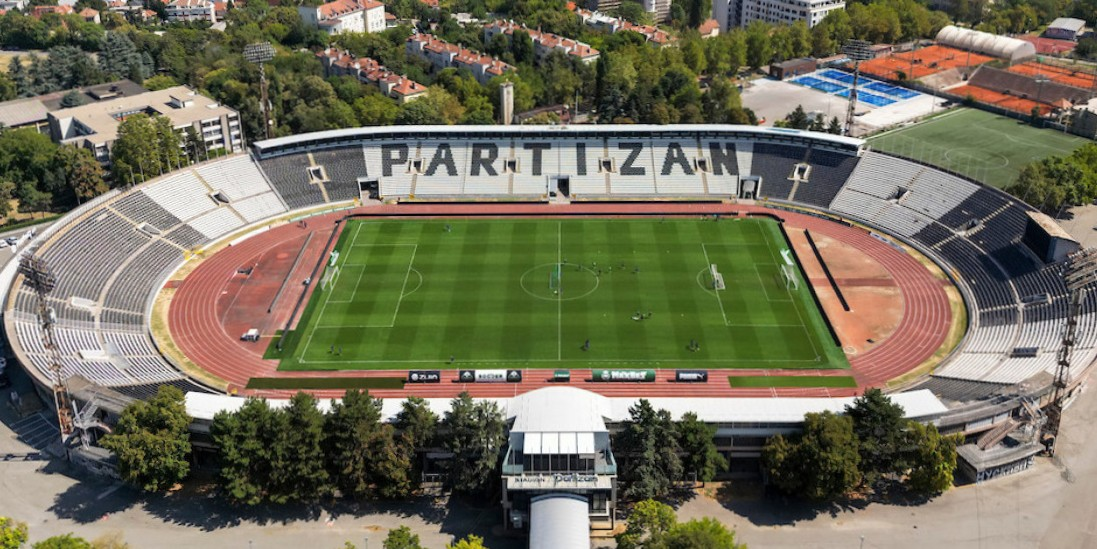
- Partizan Stadium hosted the final

Tournament details
- Country: Serbia

Final positions
- Champions: Partizan
- Runners-up: Zemun

Tournament statistics
- Matches played: 32
- Goals scored: 97 (3.03 per match)
- Top goal scorer: Lamine Diarra

Awards
- Best player: Nemanja Jovšić

The 2007–08 Serbian Cup season was the second season of Serbia's football knockout competition. Red Star, the holders of the Lav Kup Srbije, began the tournament as favorites to lift the cup again. It seemed as though Red Star where on their way to winning the cup again having passed all stages with class. Then came the semifinal clash with arch-rival Partizan in what many considered the game of the tournament. The match came with much controversy due to a goal Red Star scored late that was flagged for offside. The replays clearly showed that Red Star's midfielder Nenad Milijaš was on, but what made matters worse was that the referee apologized to him and admitted that he had made a mistake. Several days after the incident the side judge retired from refereeing and openly apologized to Red Star and the supporters of the team. In the final, Partizan went on to face heavy underdog FK Zemun, who had a miracle run in the cup which included three wins from penalty shootouts on their road to the final. Zemun's luck ran out however, as Partizan cruised to a 3–0 victory to claim their tenth domestic cup.

== Individual awards ==
Award	Recipient	Affiliation
Most Valuable Player	Nemanja Jovšić	Zemun
Golden Boot	Lamine Diarra	Partizan
Best Referee	Dragan Krstić	Belgrade

== Round of 32 ==
The draw for the Round of 32 was held on September 15, 2007. All of the matches for this round were played on September 26, 2007. The teams in bold won.

Team 1	Score	Team 2
**Hajduk Kula**	4–1	Radnički Pirot
**Javor Habitfarm**	3–0	Mladost Lučani
**OFK Beograd**	2–0	Mladenovac
**Vlasina**	2–1	Voždovac
Bačinci Big Bull	2–4	**Čukarički**
**Sinđelić Niš**	1–0	BSK Borča
**Bežanija**	3–1	ČSK
**Inđija**	3–2	Vojvodina
**Napredak**	4–0	BASK
Teleoptik	1–2	**Red Star**
Mladost Apatin	1–2	**Srem**
**Radnički Niš**	2–0	Borac
Novi Pazar	0–3	**Smederevo**
**Banat**	2–2 (p. 5–4)	Sevojno
Mokra Gora	1–1 (p. 3–4)	**Zemun**
**Partizan**	4–1	Rad

== Round of 16 ==
The draw for the Round of 16 was held on October 9, 2007 with all of the participating clubs in attendance except for Red Star who had to attend the UEFA Cup draw in Nyon, Switzerland. Radnički Niš vs Banat kicked off this round on October 23, 2007 with Banat being the first side to book their spot into the quarterfinals. All of the remaining matches for this round were played on October 24, 2007. Red Star vs Napredak was postponed because Red Star requested the delay due to them having a crucial UEFA Cup group stage match against German giants Bayern Munich the next day. The game was later rescheduled for February 23, 2008 and the result was a predictable victory for Red Star.

Team 1	Score	Team 2
**Sinđelić Niš**	2–0	Bežanija
Inđija	0–2	**OFK Beograd**
Srem	0–3	**Partizan**
Hajduk Kula	0–1	**Javor Habitfarm**
Radnički Niš	0–1	**Banat**
**Zemun**	1–1 (p. 6–5)	Vlasina
Smederevo	1–1 (p. 3–5)	**Čukarički**
**Red Star**	3–1	Napredak

== Quarter-finals ==
The draw for the quarterfinals was held on February 28, 2008 and it paired several great matches, including two that went to penalty shootouts. The matches took place on March 19, 2008 and the teams in bold advanced to the semi-finals.

Team 1	Score	Team 2
**OFK Beograd**	1–1 (p. 5–4)	Javor Habitfarm
Čukarički	1–1 (p. 1–4)	**Red Star**
**Zemun**	1–0	Banat
**Partizan**	5–1	Sinđelić Niš

== Semi-finals ==
The draw for the Semifinals was held on March 28, 2008 at the Šumarice Hotel in Kragujevac, Serbia. Red Star and arch-rivals Partizan were drawn against each other in the semifinals for the second consecutive year. The other match pitted OFK Beograd against the surprise team of the tournament Zemun. Both matches were played on April 16, 2008.

16 April 2008
14:00 CEST

Zemun	1–1	OFK Beograd
Vujošević 5'	Report	Veselinović 51'
Penalties
	4–3

Zemun Stadium, Belgrade
Attendance: 2,000
Referee: Milorad Mažić

16 April 2008
18:00 CEST

Red Star	2–3	Partizan
Burzanović 54'; Jestrović 67'	Report	Diarra 13', 22'; Jovetić 79'

Red Star Stadium, Belgrade
Attendance: 18,000
Referee: Ninoslav Spasić

== Final ==
The Lav Kup final match was played at Partizan Stadium, on May 7, 2008. Partizan played against second division side FK Zemun. Partizan already considered favorites then received an even bigger edge with the Serbian FA's decision to switch the final to Partizan's home ground. It was initially supposed to be at Red Star's stadium but was later moved. The huge underdogs began the match poorly and where controlled by Partizan. After only 12 minutes Lamine Diarra put Partizan in front. Zemun seemed to be content with only being down one and both sides played passively until Diarra struck again 4 minutes before half time. The second half saw huge changes in Zemun's play. Zemun pushed more players forward and began creating opportunities but Partizan's defense was too good and Partizan seemed happy with playing off the counterattack which ended up being a great decision as Partizan would grab a third. After several last gasp efforts by Zemun, Darko Maletić crossed a dangerous ball in extra time which Diarra headed in for his third of the match. Shortly after the final whistle blew, and Partizan players and fans began celebrating their first Cup win since 2000–01.

7 May 2008
18:00 CEST

Zemun	0–3	Partizan
		Diarra 12', 41', 90+2'

Partizan Stadium, Belgrade
Attendance: 13,950
Referee: Dragan Krstić (Belgrade)

Home Club	Score	Visiting Club
FK Zemun	**0 – 3**	**FK Partizan**
**Date**	May 7, 2008	
**Locale**	Partizan Stadium, Belgrade, Serbia	
**Attendance**	13,950 (cap. 32,887)	
**Referee**	Dragan Krstić (Belgrade)	
**FK Zemun** (coach: Slobodan Kustudić)	Jovšić, Cvejić (Milčić 74'), Ivanović (Vranić 57'), Jovanović, Mitrović, Jandrić, Mijailović (Lekić 57'), Todorov (Јoksimović), Živanović, Srećo, Zlatković	
**FK Partizan** (coach: Slaviša Jokanović)	Božović, Maletić, Rnić, Đorđević, Obradović, Juca (Mitrović 58'), Moreira (Stjepanović 74'), Lazić, Tošić, Diarra, Jovetić (capt.) (Čadikovski 88')	
Notes	Scorer: 0–1 Diarra 12', 0–2 Diarra 41', 0–3 Diarra 90+2'	
