= Branko Rašović =

Yugoslav footballer (1942–2024)

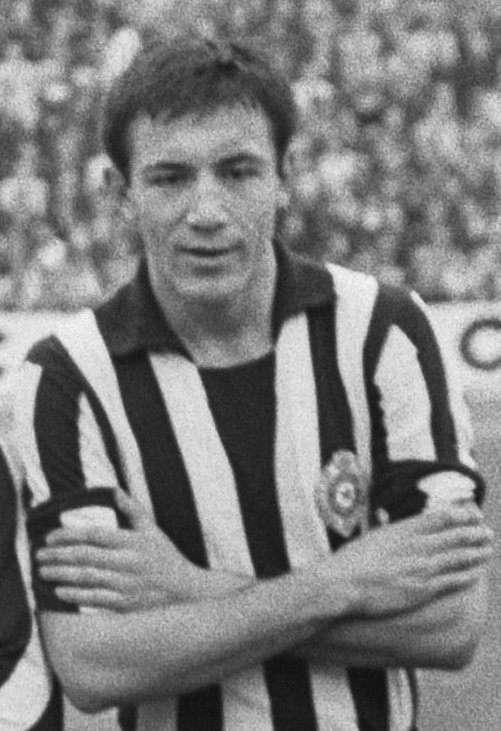
- Rašović lining up for Partizan ahead of the 1966 European Cup final

Personal information
- Full name: Branko Rašović
- Date of birth: 11 April 1942
- Place of birth: Podgorica, Italian-occupied Montenegro
- Date of death: 11 October 2024 (aged 82)
- Place of death: Belgrade, Serbia
- Height: 1.85 m (6 ft 1 in)
- Position: Defender

Youth career
- 1957–1960: Budućnost Titograd

Senior career*
Years	Team	Apps	(Gls)
1960–1964	Budućnost Titograd	60	(2)
1964–1969	Partizan	90	(0)
1969–1974	Borussia Dortmund	109	(0)
1975	Galenika Zemun	1	(0)
Total		260	(2)

International career
1964–1967	Yugoslavia	10	(0)
- * Club domestic league appearances and goals

Branko Rašović (Serbian Cyrillic: Бранко Рашовић; 11 April 1942 – 11 October 2024) was a Yugoslav footballer who played as a defender.

== Club career ==
After joining his hometown club Budućnost Titograd as a trainee in 1957, Rašović was promoted to the first team and signed his first professional contract in 1960. He was part of the team that earned promotion to the Yugoslav First League in 1962, but was unable to help them avoid an immediate relegation.

Following the expiration of his contract with Budućnost, Rašović was acquired by Partizan in the summer of 1964, helping the side win the championship title in his debut season. He was also a regular member of the team that reached the 1966 European Cup final in Brussels, narrowly losing to Real Madrid. In total, Rašović spent five seasons with the Crno-beli, amassing 90 league appearances.

In June 1969, Rašović moved abroad to West Germany and signed with Borussia Dortmund, becoming the club's first foreign player. He recorded 79 appearances in the Bundesliga over three seasons, before the team suffered relegation in 1972, and subsequently played 30 more games for the Schwarzgelben in the Regionalliga over the next two seasons. After leaving Borussia, Rašović returned to his homeland and briefly played for lower league side Galenika Zemun.

== International career ==
At international level, Rašović was capped 10 times for Yugoslavia, making his national team debut on 1 April 1964 in a 1–0 friendly win over Bulgaria. He earned his final cap on 7 October 1967 in a Euro qualifier with West Germany, a 3–1 away loss.

== Post-playing career ==
After hanging up his boots, Rašović started working as an assistant manager to Ivan Čabrinović at Galenika Zemun. He returned to Partizan as an assistant to Josip Duvančić in the summer of 1979. After serving as an assistant to several other managers, including Tomislav Kaloperović and Ivica Osim, Rašović spent many years working within the FK Partizan Academy until his retirement in 2008.

== Personal life ==
Rašović is the father of fellow footballer Vuk Rašović.

== Death ==
Rašović died on 11 October 2024 at the age of 82. He was buried at the Belgrade New Cemetery.

== Career statistics ==
=== Club ===
Appearances and goals by club, season and competition
Club	Season	League		
Club	Season	Division	Apps	Goals
Budućnost Titograd	1960–61	Yugoslav Second League	3	0
Budućnost Titograd	1961–62	Yugoslav Second League	7	0
Budućnost Titograd	1962–63	Yugoslav First League	22	0
Budućnost Titograd	1963–64	Yugoslav Second League	28	2
Budućnost Titograd	Total		60	2
Partizan	1964–65	Yugoslav First League	17	0
Partizan	1965–66	Yugoslav First League	21	0
Partizan	1966–67	Yugoslav First League	24	0
Partizan	1967–68	Yugoslav First League	6	0
Partizan	1968–69	Yugoslav First League	22	0
Partizan	Total		90	0
Borussia Dortmund	1969–70	Bundesliga	15	0
Borussia Dortmund	1970–71	Bundesliga	31	0
Borussia Dortmund	1971–72	Bundesliga	33	0
Borussia Dortmund	1972–73	Regionalliga	10	0
Borussia Dortmund	1973–74	Regionalliga	20	0
Borussia Dortmund	Total		109	0
Galenika Zemun	1974–75	Serbian League	1	0
Career total			260	2

=== International ===
Appearances and goals by national team and year
National team	Year	Apps	Goals
Yugoslavia	1964	2	0
Yugoslavia	1965	1	0
Yugoslavia	1966	3	0
Yugoslavia	1967	4	0
Total		10	0

== Honours ==
Budućnost Titograd

- Yugoslav Second League: 1961–62 (Group East)

Partizan

- Yugoslav First League: 1964–65
