= 1964–65 Yugoslav First League =

Prva savezna liga
- Season: 1964–65
- Dates: 9 August 1964 – 10 June 1965
- Champions: Partizan (6th title)
- Relegated: Sutjeska
- European Cup: Partizan
- Cup Winners' Cup: Dinamo Zagreb
- Inter-Cities Fairs Cup: Red Star Belgrade; Zagreb
- Top goalscorer: Zlatko Dračić (23)

The 1964–65 Yugoslav First League had an odd number of teams because FK Vardar was allowed to compete in the top league despite getting relegated the previous season. The state and FA authorities made this decision due to the major earthquake (6.1 Richter scale) that hit Skopje on 26 July 1963. The thinking was that having a team in top-flight would boost the citizens' morale.

After week 8 of fixtures on 13 September 1964, the league went on an almost two-month break in order to accommodate the October 1964 Yugoslav Olympic national team's participation at the 1964 Tokyo Olympics where the team consisting entirely of players from the Yugoslav First League made it out of its round-robin group but lost in the quarterfinals to West Germany. The season resumed on 8 November 1964.

== Teams ==
At the end of the previous season only FK Novi Sad was relegated – in spite of finishing last, FK Vardar was allowed to stay in top flight due to the 1963 Skopje earthquake. Since NK Zagreb and Sutjeska Nikšić were promoted from Yugoslav Second League, the league was contested by 15 teams.

Team	Location	Federal Republic	Position in 1963–64
Dinamo Zagreb	Zagreb	SR Croatia	3rd
Hajduk Split	Split	SR Croatia	10th
OFK Belgrade	Belgrade	SR Serbia	2nd
Partizan	Belgrade	SR Serbia	5th
Radnički Niš	Niš	SR Serbia	8th
Red Star	Belgrade	SR Serbia	1st
Rijeka	Rijeka	SR Croatia	9th
Sarajevo	Sarajevo	SR Bosnia and Herzegovina	4th
Sutjeska	Nikšić	SR Montenegro	—N/a
Trešnjevka	Zagreb	SR Croatia	11th
Vardar	Skopje	SR Macedonia	14th
Velež	Mostar	SR Bosnia and Herzegovina	12th
Vojvodina	Novi Sad	SR Serbia	7th
NK Zagreb	Zagreb	SR Croatia	—N/a
Željezničar	Sarajevo	SR Bosnia and Herzegovina	6th

== League table ==
Pos	Team	Pld	W	D	L	GF	GA	GD	Pts	Qualification or relegation
1	Partizan (C)	28	19	5	4	62	34	+28	43	Qualification for European Cup preliminary round
2	Sarajevo	28	15	5	8	52	38	+14	35	
3	Red Star Belgrade	28	13	9	6	50	38	+12	35	Invitation for Inter-Cities Fairs Cup first round
4	Rijeka	28	14	6	8	47	30	+17	34	
5	Željezničar	28	13	7	8	39	30	+9	33	
6	NK Zagreb	28	12	5	11	47	42	+5	29	Invitation for Inter-Cities Fairs Cup first round
7	Radnički Niš	28	9	10	9	39	33	+6	28	
8	Dinamo Zagreb	28	11	4	13	35	34	+1	26	Qualification for Cup Winners' Cup first round
9	Vojvodina	28	8	10	10	32	37	−5	26	
10	OFK Belgrade	28	9	6	13	35	40	−5	24	
11	Vardar	28	6	11	11	23	33	−10	23	Invitation for Balkans Cup
12	Hajduk Split	28	7	9	12	28	39	−11	23	
13	Velež	28	9	3	16	37	53	−16	21	
14	Trešnjevka	28	7	7	14	27	46	−19	21	
15	Sutjeska Nikšić (R)	28	6	7	15	31	57	−26	19	Relegation to Yugoslav Second League

Source: rsssf.org
Rules for classification: 1) points; 2) goal difference; 3) number of goals scored.
(C) Champions; (R) Relegated

== Results ==
Home \ Away	DIN	HAJ	OFK	PAR	RNI	RSB	RIJ	SAR	SUT	TRE	VAR	VEL	VOJ	ZAG	ŽEL
Dinamo Zagreb		2–0	0–1	1–2	1–1	0–0	2–3	1–2	6–0	3–2	2–0	3–1	3–2	2–4	0–1
Hajduk Split	0–1		3–1	0–1	2–0	1–1	1–1	0–2	1–0	1–0	0–0	2–0	2–1	2–2	1–1
OFK Belgrade	1–2	0–0		1–2	1–1	2–0	0–0	3–0	5–1	2–0	1–0	1–0	3–0	0–2	1–4
Partizan	1–0	3–1	3–3		4–3	1–2	1–0	0–1	3–2	4–0	2–0	4–3	3–0	3–1	1–0
Radnički Niš	1–0	4–1	0–0	1–1		2–3	0–0	2–1	3–1	2–1	1–0	5–1	0–1	3–0	1–0
Red Star	2–1	1–0	4–1	2–2	2–1		0–0	4–0	4–2	3–0	3–0	5–3	0–1	2–1	0–0
Rijeka	0–1	4–1	2–2	1–0	3–2	3–1		5–2	2–1	3–1	2–0	2–0	3–1	3–2	1–0
Sarajevo	4–0	4–1	4–0	4–5	1–1	3–0	2–1		2–0	3–1	1–1	4–3	3–0	3–1	3–1
Sutjeska	0–1	3–1	1–0	1–1	2–2	1–1	2–0	1–2		0–0	0–2	3–2	0–0	3–2	2–0
Trešnjevka	3–1	1–1	1–0	1–2	0–0	1–1	1–5	0–0	3–2		3–2	0–2	1–1	1–1	2–0
Vardar	0–0	3–3	1–0	2–2	2–0	1–1	1–0	0–0	0–0	1–2		0–0	1–0	2–1	0–2
Velež	0–1	0–2	2–0	3–2	1–1	1–4	2–1	1–0	4–1	0–1	2–1		2–1	3–1	0–0
Vojvodina	0–0	2–1	1–0	0–2	1–1	2–2	1–1	2–1	7–2	1–0	1–1	2–0		0–0	1–1
NK Zagreb	1–0	1–0	4–1	0–3	2–1	4–1	1–0	4–0	3–0	1–0	2–2	2–0	2–2		2–3
Željezničar	2–1	0–0	2–5	1–4	1–0	4–1	2–1	0–0	0–0	4–1	2–0	4–1	2–1	2–0	

Source: DataSoccer.it
Legend: Blue = home team win; Yellow = draw; Red = away team win.

== Winning squad ==
Champions:

- FK Partizan (Coach: Aleksandar Atanacković)

player (league matches/league goals)

- Vladica Kovačević (28/14)
- Josip Pirmajer (27/7)
- Ljubomir Mihajlović (26/0)
- Milan Galić (24/15)
- Ivan Ćurković (23/0) (goalkeeper)
- Mustafa Hasanagić (20/13)
- Radoslav Bečejac (20/2)
- Jovan Miladinović (19/0)
- Joakim Vislavski (18/5)
- Fahrudin Jusufi (18/0)
- Branko Rašović (17/0)
- Velibor Vasović (15/0)
- Velimir Sombolac (14/0)
- Milan Damjanović (11/0)
- Milan Vukelić (10/0)
- Lazar Radović (8/0)
- Bora Milutinović (6/0)
- Mane Bajić (5/1)
- Miodrag Petrović (5/1)
- Milutin Šoškić (4/0) (goalkeeper)
- Branislav Mihajlović (2/0)
- Jovan Ćurčić (1/0) (goalkeeper)
- Vojislav Simeunović (1/0)

== Top scorers ==
Rank	Player	Club	Goals
1	(Socialist Federal Republic of Yugoslavia) Zlatko Dračić	NK Zagreb	23
2	(Socialist Federal Republic of Yugoslavia) Tonči Gulin	Rijeka	16
3	(Socialist Federal Republic of Yugoslavia) Milan Galić	Partizan	15
4	(Socialist Federal Republic of Yugoslavia) Vladica Kovačević	Partizan	14
5	(Socialist Federal Republic of Yugoslavia) Mustafa Hasanagić	Partizan	13
5	(Socialist Federal Republic of Yugoslavia) Mišo Smajlović	Željezničar	13
5	(Socialist Federal Republic of Yugoslavia) Jovan Anđelković	Radnički Niš	13
8	(Socialist Federal Republic of Yugoslavia) Zoran Prljinčević	Red Star	12
9	(Socialist Federal Republic of Yugoslavia) Bora Kostić	Red Star	10

== See also ==
- 1964–65 Yugoslav Second League
- 1964–65 Yugoslav Cup
