= FK Partizan =

Association football club

Partizan
- Full name: Fudbalski klub Partizan
- Nicknames: Parni valjak (The Steamroller); Crno-beli (The Black-Whites)
- Short name: PAR, PTZ, PRT
- Founded: 4 October 1945; 81 years ago
- Ground: Partizan Stadium
- Capacity: 29,775
- Owner: JSD Partizan
- President: Rasim Ljajić
- Head coach: vacant
- League: Serbian SuperLiga
- 2025–26: Serbian SuperLiga, 3rd of 16
- Website: partizan.rs
Home colours	Away colours	Third colours

Fudbalski klub Partizan (Serbian Cyrillic: Фудбалски клуб Партизан, IPA: [fûdbalskiː klûːb partǐzaːn]; lit. 'Football Club Partizan'), often referred to in English as Partizan Belgrade, is a Serbian professional football club based in Belgrade. It forms a major part of the JSD Partizan multi-sport club. The club plays in the Serbian SuperLiga and has spent its entire history in the top tier of Yugoslav and Serbian football, winning a total of 46 official trophies, finishing in the Yugoslav league all-time table as second. Its home ground is the Partizan Stadium, where the team have played since 1949. Partizan holds records such as playing in the first European Champions Cup match on 4 September 1955, as well as becoming the first club from Southeast Europe to reach the European Champions Cup final, when it did so in 1966. Partizan was the first Serbian club to compete in the group stage of the UEFA Champions League.

The club has a long-standing rivalry with Red Star Belgrade. Matches between these two clubs are known as the Eternal derby ("Večiti derbi") and rate as one of the greatest cross-town clashes in the world. Partizan also has supporters in some of the former-Yugoslav republics and in the Serb diaspora. Their popular nickname 'The Steamroller' (Parni valjak) was originally used in the press report after the 7–1 hammering of Red Star at the 13th Eternal Derby on 6 December 1953. This nickname was later embedded in the lyrics of the club anthem.

Partizan Youth Academy is one of the most renowned and export-oriented in Europe. CIES (University of Neuchâtel International Centre for Sports Studies) Football Observatory report of November 2015 ranks Partizan at the top place of training clubs out of the 31 European leagues surveyed. CIES report of 2019 confirmed Partizan as the most productive training club in Europe, with 75 of their academy graduates currently playing across 31 European top divisions.

== History ==
=== Founders and origins ===
Partizan was founded on 4 October 1945 in Belgrade, as a football section of the Central House of the Yugoslav Army "Partizan", and was named in honour of the Partisans, the communist military formation who fought against fascism during World War II in Yugoslavia. The club was formed and initially managed by the group of young high officers of the Yugoslav People's Army and veterans of the Spanish Civil War. Among them were Koča Popović, Peko Dapčević, Svetozar Vukmanović, Bogdan Vujošević, Mijalko Todorović, Otmar Kreačić, Božo Švarc and Ratko "Čoče" Vujović – elected the first president of the club. Two days after its establishment, Partizan made its first step on the football scene, with the friendly match against selection of Zemun that ended 4–2. Silvester Šereš entered the record books as the first goal scorer in the history of Partizan, while goalkeeper Franjo Glaser was simultaneously the first club manager. Just three weeks later, Partizan went on the first of many international tours, travelling to Czechoslovakia where they beat the selection of Slovak Army with 3–1. At the time, just months after the World War II in Yugoslavia ended, no organized football competition was yet restored, so Partizan played only friendly games and tournaments both home and abroad. The club's first international engagement was a meeting against another army side, CSKA Moscow from what was then Soviet Union, on 6 December 1945 in Belgrade.

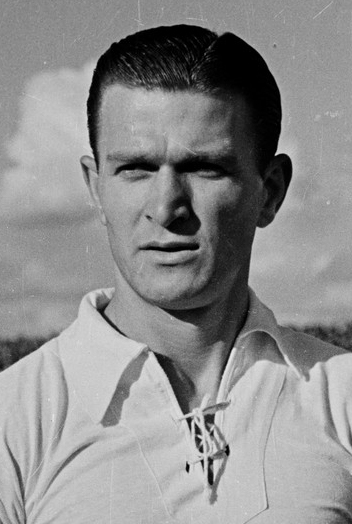
Club legend Stjepan Bobek, voted Partizan's best player of all time in 1995.

=== Partizan's babies – the first European final (1958–1966) ===
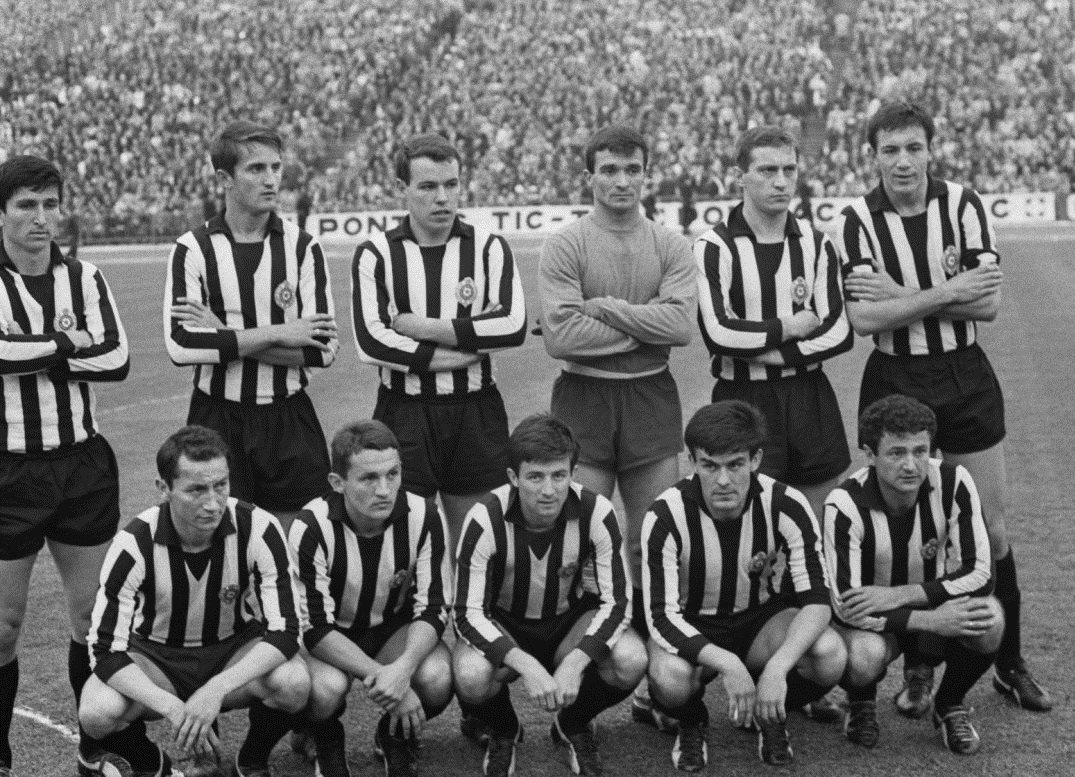
FK Partizan's 1966 European Cup final starting lineup coached by Abdulah Gegić.

By the mid-1950s, the first big Partizan generation was well over its peak. Only two titles and four cups in its first 15 years of existence were not enough for a club of Partizan's stature, ambition and popularity. In 1958, the club left way behind 13 years of playing in blue-red kits and adopted the now famous black and white colors. The change in the club's image and appearance was followed by radical changes in the playing squad. The number of young players, offspring of Partizan's own youth ranks known as Partizanove bebe (The Partizan's babies), soon emerged into one of the best generations Europe's ever seen. The rise of the generation began with Milutin Šoškić, Fahrudin Jusufi, Jovan Miladinović, Velibor Vasović, Milan Galić, Ilija Mitić, Zvezdan Čebinac and Vladica Kovačević. Very soon, they were joined by Lazar Radović, Velimir Sombolac, Ljubomir Mihajlović and Mustafa Hasanagić, and finally Ivan Ćurković, Josip Pirmajer, Branko Rašović and Radoslav Bečejac. Managers Illés Spitz, Florijan Matekalo and Stjepan Bobek monitored and guided their development. The decision to rely mostly on talented youngsters scouted from all over the country quickly gave results – Partizan took three consecutive championship titles, in 1961, 1962 and 1963, the first title hat-trick in the Yugoslav First League. Efficient and attractive performances earned the club its popular nickname "Parni valjak" ("The Steamroller"). In 1964–65, the team added the fourth title in five years (interrupted by city rival Red Star during the 1963–64 season). As early as the 1960s, a fierce and intense rivalry grew up between Partizan and Red Star.

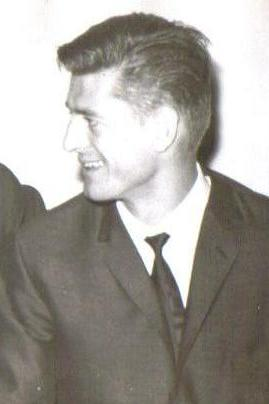
Club legend Miloš Milutinović scored two goals in the first ever European Champion Clubs' Cup

The 1965–66 European Cup campaign was the crown of this generation's career. After eliminating French Nantes (2–0, 2–2) and German champion Werder Bremen (3–0, 1–0) in the first two rounds, Partizan were drawn against Sparta Prague in the quarter-finals. In the first leg, held in Prague, Partizan suffered a hard 4–1 defeat. Although they were not given any chances in the return leg in Belgrade, Partizan pulled off a convincing 5–0 win in front of 50,000 spectators, and with aggregate score 6–4 qualified for the semifinals. The semi-finals would see Partizan taking part in an emotional tie that would bring Manchester United, in their first season back in the European Cup after the Munich air disaster, returning to the scene of their final game, at the JNA Stadium, before embarking on that fateful journey home (on the way home from a European Cup quarter-final victory against Red Star, which was played at JNA Stadium, the aircraft carrying the Manchester United players, officials and journalists crashed while attempting to take off after refuelling in Munich). Manchester United, led by George Best and Bobby Charlton, awaited finally them on the last step to the finals. Partizan won the first leg at JNA Stadium 2–0, and resisted the heavy pressure on Old Trafford, conceding only once; with a 2–1 aggregate scoreline, they eliminated the English giants. Partizan's babies achieved the greatest success in history of Partizan, a place in the 1966 European Cup Final against Real Madrid. The final game was played on 11 May at Heysel Stadium, Brussels. Until the 70th minute, Partizan was 1–0 up through a goal by Velibor Vasović, but ultimately lost to the Spaniards 2–1. Partizan may have come close to a famous victory, but they had now missed their chance as the side was immediately broken up with their star players heading west. Still, Partizan became the first club from the Balkans and Eastern Europe to have played in a European Cup final.

=== The brief return – the first European trophy (1976–1982) ===
On 11 July 1976, in Ljubljana, Partizan played the last game of the season against Olimpija and needed a win to clinch the title ahead of rivals Hajduk Split. In the last second before the final whistle, Nenad Bjeković scored the winning goal and Partizan won 0–1. The seventh championship trophy was finally won, after full decade of waiting, by the new generation of players, such as Momčilo Vukotić, Bjeković, Rešad Kunovac, Ilija Zavišić, Refik Kozić, Ivan Golac, Radmilo Ivančević, Boško Đorđević, Nenad Stojković. Partizan then won its eighth title in 1977–78, enforced with Nikica Klinčarski, Petar Borota, Slobodan Santrač, Aco Trifunović, Dževad Prekazi and Pavle Grubješić. That same year, Partizan won its first European trophy, the Mitropa Cup. The Black & Whites finished first in Group A, ahead of Perugia and Zbrojovka Brno and defeated Hungarian side Honvéd in the finals, 1–0. Its manager was Ante Mladinić. Unexpectedly, the following 1978–79 season turned out to be the worst in Partizan history: they finished 15th in the league, barely avoiding relegation with a 4–2 victory against Budućnost in the last fixture. The new crisis was serious, which reflected in the results next season, when Partizan finished 13th. It took a two more seasons, but Partizan eventually recovered.

=== Memorable years (1982–1991) ===
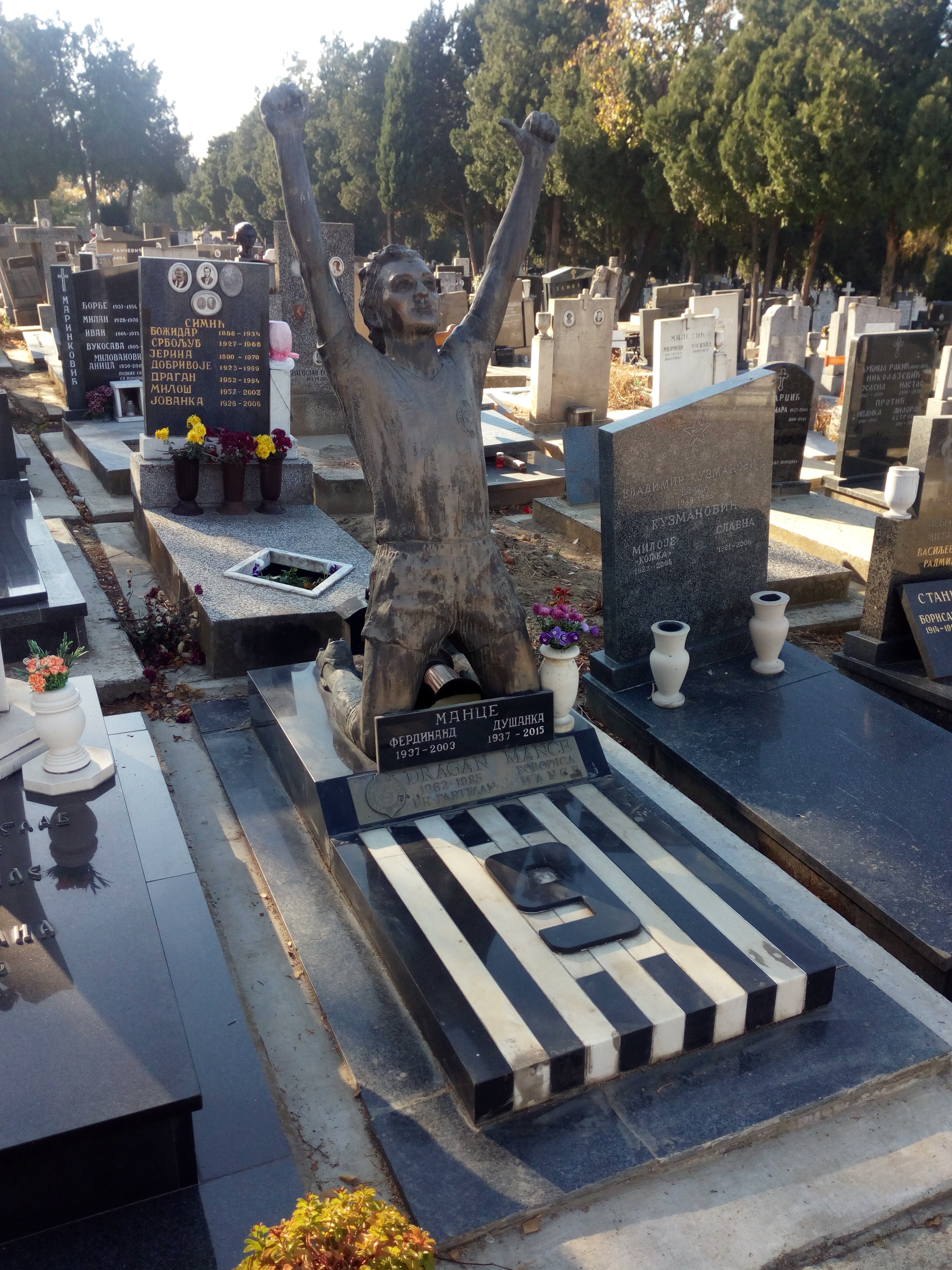
The untimely death of star player Dragan Mance in a 1985 traffic collision made him into a club legend.

When Momčilo Vukotić, Nenad Stojković and Nikica Klinčarski were joined by Ljubomir Radanović, Zvonko Živković, Zoran Dimitrijević and Dragan Mance, another great generation was formed. Partizan became champion for 1982–83 season, in large part due to extraordinary performances of a young Dragan Mance. He helped Partizan win the league by scoring 15 goals, and immediately became a fan favourite. He also led the club in their 1984–85 UEFA Cup second round tie against Queens Park Rangers, one of the most memorable matches in the club's history. QPR won the first leg 6–2, but Partizan advanced after a 4–0 return victory. A goal which Mance scored against the English side is considered one of the most remarkable goals in the history of Partizan. That match was voted 70th among the Top 100 greatest matches in the history of football in a poll organized by Eurosport in September 2009. On 3 September 1985, the players tragically lost their teammate and the fans lost their idol – Mance died in a car crash on Novi Sad-Belgrade highway. He was only 22 years old, and at the peak of his popularity. Even today, Mance is considered to be the greatest club legend by the fans of Partizan. In his honour, the street next to the club's stadium in Belgrade has carried his name since 2011.

In 1985–86, Partizan won the title with a 4–0 win over Željezničar due to better goal difference than second-placed Red Star. However, Yugoslav FA President Slavko Šajber decided that the entire last round of fixtures had to be replayed after accusations that certain results had been fixed. Partizan refused to replay its match, after which the game was awarded 3–0 to Željezničar, and the title was given to Red Star, who thus got to play in 1986–87 European Cup. Because of these events, 12 clubs started the next 1986–87 season with a deduction of six points, Partizan among them. Vardar, who had not been deducted six points, won the title and subsequently participated in 1987–88 European Cup. However, after a sequence of appeals and lawsuits which eventually led to Yugoslav Constitutional Court, the original final table of 1985–86, with Partizan as champions, was officially recognized in mid-1987. Also, the points deduction from 1986–87 season was annulled and the title was given to Partizan, who headed the table without the deduction. These controversial events prevented the generation of Milko Đurovski, Fahrudin Omerović, Zvonko Varga, Vladimir Vermezović, Admir Smajić, Goran Stevanović, Nebojša Vučićević, Miloš Đelmaš, Srečko Katanec, Fadil Vokrri and Bajro Župić from showing their full potential in Europe.

Partizan spent the final years in Yugoslavia undergoing significant organizational changes. In 1989, former goalkeeper Ivan Ćurković became club president while Mirko Marjanović became the president of Partizan's executive board. Most important, Partizan players in these final years were Predrag Mijatović, Slaviša Jokanović, Predrag Spasić, Dragoljub and Branko Brnović, Budimir Vujačić, Vujadin Stanojković, Darko Milanič and Džoni Novak. However, this great generation was overshadowed by their crosstown rival Red Star and its rampage through domestic league, Europe and the world. Partizan only won the 1989 national cup, 32 years after the last victory in that competition. The last trophy won before the breakup of Yugoslavia was the 1989 Yugoslav Super Cup, the first and the only one organized. Also in the same season 1988/89, Partizan won the prestigious international tournament Uhrencup, which is played every year in Switzerland and to this day. That year, Partizan took three trophies which is a club record in one season. In 1987, Partizan signed Chinese national team players Jia Xiuquan and Liu Haiguang and they entered history as they, along Xie Yuxin and Gu Guangming, were the first Chinese footballers ever to have played in Europe.

=== Dark decade and domestic success (1990s) ===
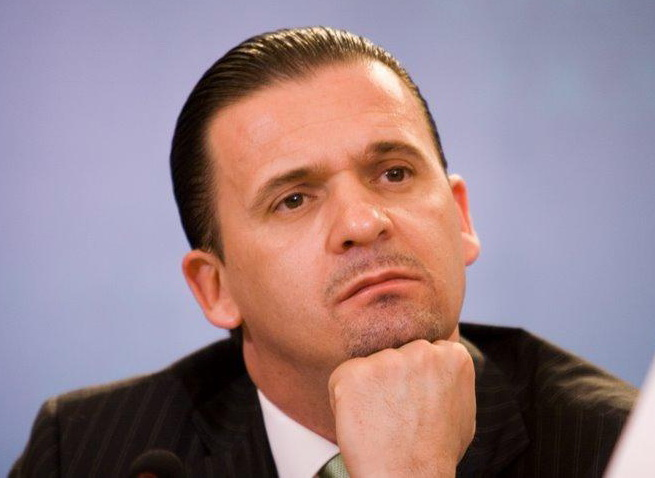
Former Partizan striker Predrag Mijatović.

After the death of President Josip Broz Tito in 1980, ethnic tension grew in Yugoslavia, with the follow, that in the early 1990s the Yugoslav state began to fall apart, and the civil war broke out. At the end of May in 1992, the United Nations Security Council imposed sanctions against the country, which led to political isolation, economic decline and hyperinflation of the Yugoslav dinar, and finally dislodged Yugoslav football from the international scene. The disintegration of Yugoslavia, the Yugoslav wars from 1991 to 1995, the resulting difficulties, as well as the sanctions had hit all Yugoslav clubs hard. After the breakup of SFR Yugoslavia in 1991, a new Yugoslavia was formed out from Serbia and Montenegro and was named FR Yugoslavia. Notwithstanding, Partizan won during the war two titles in a row, in 1993 and 1994. The next two championships Partizan won came in 1996 and 1997, but after only few years of peace, the Yugoslav clubs stood again before difficult times. Between 1998 and 1999, peace was broken again because the situation in Kosovo worsened with continued clashes between Yugoslav security forces and the Kosovo Liberation Army. The confrontations led to the Kosovo War and finally to the NATO bombing of Yugoslavia, which started four days after the 112th Red Star–Partizan derby, and this without a UN Mandate. The bombing campaign was criticized, especially for the number of civilian casualties that resulted from the bombing. By this time, Partizan won in 1999 a further championship title, again during a war.

During these turbulent 1990s, the club won also several national cups, this in 1992, 1994 and 1998. The key man for these trophies was Ljubiša Tumbaković, who became the most successful manager in Partizan's history. In 1997, Partizan was reintroduced to European competitions following the lift of the UEFA ban on clubs from FR Yugoslavia, but while the national team continued where they had stopped in the spring of 1992, the clubs had all their results erased and were treated as the beginners in the European competitions. The decision met with incomprehension among the club officials of the Yugoslav clubs. That decision will have long-term catastrophic consequences for Partizan – instead of enjoying the merits of its own many-year work, they would get harder opponents from the start and the competition would start already in July. This decade has been marked by numerous team changes and the circle of selling the best players to richer European clubs after just a couple of seasons of first-team football and replacing them with fresh young talents. Many players are credited with the successes of the nineties, such as Predrag Mijatović, Slaviša Jokanović, Savo Milošević, Albert Nađ, Dragan Ćirić, Zoran Mirković, Saša Ćurčić, Branko Brnović, Goran Pandurović, Dražen Bolić, Niša Saveljić, Damir Čakar, Budimir Vujačić, Ivan Tomić, Georgi Hristov, Đorđe Tomić, Ivica Kralj, Mateja Kežman and many others.

=== The new beginning (2000–2007) ===
The new millennium has arrived, but the goals remain the same. In the last 12 years, Partizan has won eight national championships, four cups and managed to qualify two times for the UEFA Champions League and five times for the UEFA Europa League. Led by Ljubiša Tumbaković, the club won two championship titles in a row, in 2001–02 and 2002–03. In Europe, Partizan did not have much success in those seasons, though the next one would become its best season in Europe after 1965–66, where it reached the 1966 European Cup final.

The club's management took the 2003 season very seriously, appointing as its new coach the former World Player of the Year Lothar Matthäus, and brought some top and experienced players like Taribo West from 1.FC Kaiserslautern, Ljubinko Drulović from Benfica and Tomasz Rząsa from Feyenoord. For the first time in its history, the club played in the UEFA Champions League after eliminating Bobby Robson's Newcastle United. In Belgrade, Partizan lost by 0–1, but in rematch at St James' Park, they won by Ivica Iliev's goal in regular time and reached the group stages after a penalty shoot-out. Later on, Partizan was drawn in a tough group with Real Madrid (the previous year's Champions League semi-finalist), Porto (the winner of the 2002–03 UEFA Cup and the eventual winner of the competition) and Marseille (the eventual runners-up of the 2003–04 UEFA Cup). The Partizan Stadium was a tough ground for the opposition and the team did not lose a home game, playing out a 0–0 draw with Real Madrid's famous Galácticos, which included players such as Zinedine Zidane, Ronaldo, Luís Figo, Roberto Carlos, Raúl and David Beckham; a 1–1 draw with Porto, led by coach José Mourinho; and Marseille, with its superstars Fabien Barthez and Didier Drogba, while playing some inspired football in the away match in Madrid (0–1), Marseille (0–3) and Porto (1–2). They are the first Serbian team to qualify for the main draw of this elite European club competition since its inception in 1992.

Playing in Europe was reflected in the championship, and Partizan lost the title. New coach Vladimir Vermezović taken the charge of a team and he superiority won the championship in 2005. Also, he became the only coach who has managed to take the team to the knockout stage of a European competition since new format. That happened in the 2004–05 UEFA Cup, where Partizan reached the round-of-16. Later on, he was eliminated by CSKA Moscow, the eventual winner of the competition. Poor results in domestic and international competitions in 2006 prompted the club's officials to look for a new head coach. First, Jürgen Röber was brought in, then later Miodrag Ješić, though neither succeeded in winning the domestic title. Although Partizan has managed to qualify for the 2006–07 UEFA Cup group stage, that season was viewed as a failure.

=== Contemporary history (2007–2020) ===
Former Partizan player Slaviša Jokanović were appointed as Partizan's new head coach, with the club also adding a new sport director in Ivan Tomić. The club strengthened its squad with some foreigners like Juca, Almami Moreira and Lamine Diarra. The 2007–08 and 2008–09 season will remain as one of the most successful in club's domestic history. In 2008–09, the club successfully defended their league and cup double from the 2007–08 season, the first time this occurred its history. But in Europe, Partizan suffered a real shock: UEFA expelled Partizan from the 2007–08 UEFA Cup season and fined the club €30,056 due to crowd trouble at their away qualifying match against Zrinjski Mostar, which forced the match to be interrupted for ten minutes. UEFA judged travelling Partizan fans to have been the culprits of the trouble, but Partizan were allowed to play the return leg while the appeal was being processed. Partizan's appeal, however, was rejected and Zrinjski Mostar qualified for the next round, although Partizan beat them by an aggregate score of 11–1. Next season, the club enforced its squad with Brazilian striker Cléo; Partizan demolished Welsh champions Rhyl with a score of 8–0 (12–0 on aggregate) on 21 July 2009. This score is their largest ever winning margin in European competitions. After relegation from the Champions League, Partizan qualified two times in a row for the second tier of UEFA competition. The Black & Whites played in the 2008 UEFA Cup and 2009 Europa League group stage but as the same in 2007, the club did not advance any further.

Partizan's starting XI under coach Stanojević in their UEFA Champions League group stage match with Arsenal on 8 December 2010

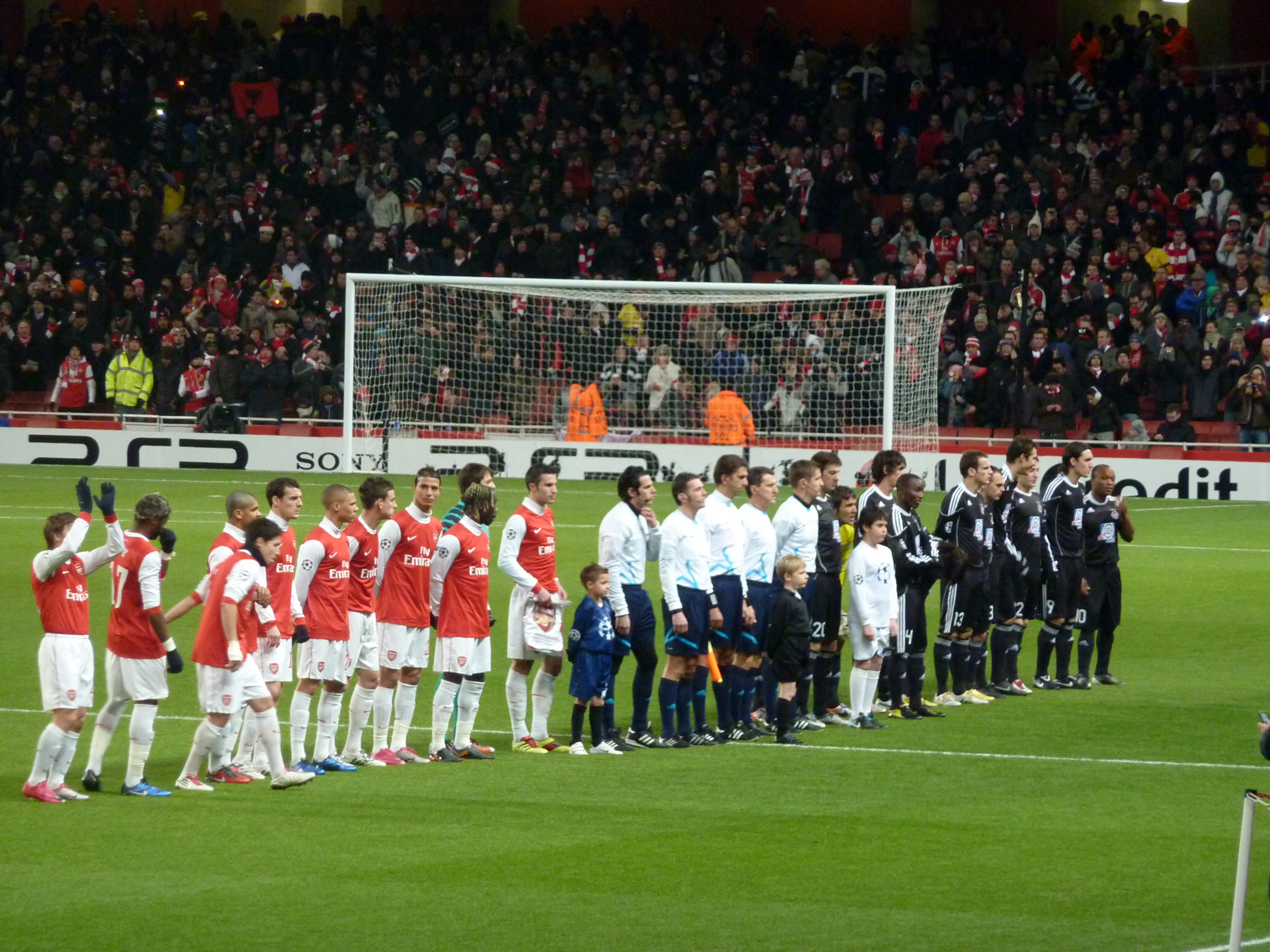
Arsenal – Partizan

After Jokanović, the club decided to give a chance to the young coach and former Partizan footballer Aleksandar Stanojević. He became the youngest head coach in the history of Partizan. Stanojević took over the club in very difficult period and managed to win the championship in 2010, although Partizan was 10 points behind from the 1st placed Red Star Belgrade. In the 2011, the club won the double. In UEFA competitions, Partizan qualified for the 2010–11 UEFA Champions League after beating Anderlecht for the second time. At the Partizan Stadium the result was 2–2. In Brussels at the Constant Vanden Stock Stadium result was also 2–2. The key man was Cléo, who scored two goals against the Belgians. After penalty drama, Partizan reached again the UEFA Champions League group stage. Now, the draw for the group phase decided that Partizan will play in group H, alongside Arsenal, Shakhtar Donetsk (the winner of the 2008–09 UEFA Cup) and Sporting Braga (the eventual runner-up of the 2010–11 UEFA Europa League). On the matchday 1, Partizan lost against Shakhtar on Donbas Arena in Donetsk (0–1). Next game Partizan played against Arsenal at Partizan Stadium and lost 1–3 after they played inspired football with a 10-man team in the last 30 minutes of the match. In two matches against Sporting Braga, Partizan failed to score and they lost both games (0–2 in Braga; 0–1 in Belgrade). In the final two group games, Shakhtar Donetsk and Arsenal both defeated Partizan again, 0–3 in Belgrade and 1–3 at the Emirates Stadium.

Half way through the following season, Stanojević was released. Partizan then signed former Chelsea manager Avram Grant, who was able to preserve the lead from the half-season. He led Partizan to their fifth consecutive league title but lost three times against fierce rivals Red Star. Grant resigned and former Partizan manager Vladimir Vermezović returned to Belgrade in May 2012. Partizan did not qualify for the 2012–13 UEFA Champions League, but did gain a place in the 2012–13 UEFA Europa League group stage. Because of poor results in the second part of national championship, Vermezović was dismissed and replaced by Vuk Rašović. Following the victory in the eternal derby and in pre-last round, Rašović secured a sixth consecutive title, a total of 25th in history of the club. As a champion of the Serbian SuperLiga for 2012–13 season, Partizan managed to equalize a national record by the number of championship titles won.

In summer of 2013, Partizan eliminated Shirak (1–1, away goal) and lost against Ludogorets Razgrad (1–3 on aggregate). In play-off round for 2013–14 UEFA Europa League, Partizan played with Thun. Partizan beat Thun 1–0 in Belgrade, but lost 0–3 in Thun and failed to get in Europa League. Without a single trophy and group stage of some European competition, the season was the worst in last ten years.

After a year of absence from the European scene, Partizan entered at the 2014–15 UEFA Europa League by beating Neftchi total score 5–3 (3–2 at home and 1–2 away). Partizan is after the draw, placed in Group C with Tottenham Hotspur, Beşiktaş and Asteras Tripolis. Partizan began the Europa League in excellent form and remained undefeated against the English giant Tottenham, but in the next four games, the club were defeated. The 2014–15 season was a successful for Partizan, winning the Serbian championship and securing passage to the group stage of the Europa League.

After falling out of the play–off for the Champions League in the summer of 2015, Partizan has directly entered the 2015–16 UEFA Europa League. The club was placed in Group L alongside Athletic Bilbao, AZ Alkmaar and FC Augsburg. Partizan made three victories in group stage (3–2 at home and 2–1 in away against AZ and 3–1 in Augsburg against same team), but he failed to get in Round of 32. Partizan failed to defend the title, but won Serbian Cup after five years, without conceding goal. Partizan is first team who managed to win the Serbian Cup without conceding goal in history.

A few days after the sixth double in club history (on the 2016–17 season), coach Nikolić left the club and signed with Hungarian club Videoton. A couple days after Nikolić's departure, Miroslav Đukić returned to Partizan. In the second qualifying round for the 2017-18 UEFA Champions League, Partizan eliminated Budućnost Podgorica (2–0 on aggregate), but in the third round they were eliminated by Olympiacos (3–5 on aggregate). In the play-off round for 2017–18 UEFA Europa League, Partizan played against Videoton and ex coach Marko Nikolić. After a 0–0 draw in Belgrade, Partizan defeated Videoton 4–0 in Felcsút and reached the group stage, where they were drawn in UEFA Europa League's Group B alongside Dynamo Kyiv, Young Boys and Skënderbeu Korçë. Partizan drawn 1–1 with Young Boys in the first match of Group B. Partizan later played against Dynamo Kyiv; after leading 2–0 at half-time, they lost 3–2. The next two Partizan matches were against Skënderbeu Korçë; in Korçë, they drew 0–0, and then won 2–0 in Belgrade. Partizan then beat Young Boys 2–1 at home, and secured a place on the knock-out stage. In the last match of the group, Partizan lost 4–1 to Dynamo Kyiv in Kyiv, although they were already qualified. Partizan ranked second in the group with eight points (two more than Young Boys and five less than Dynamo Kyiv). In the round of 32, Partizan played against Viktoria Plzeň; in Belgrade, they took the lead, but then conceded a late goal, which came from an offside position, thus ending the match with a 1–1 draw. In Plzeň, Viktoria won 2–0, and Partizan were eliminated from UEFA Europa League at the round of 32. The result was 3–1 for Viktoria on aggregate.

At the start of 2019–20 season squad was strengthened with Israeli international Bibras Natcho, Japanese international Takuma Asano and talented Nigerian striker Umar Sadiq. In July and August 2019, Partizan secured their ninth participation in the group stage of UEFA Europa League. Under Savo Milošević's leadership, Partizan knocked out Connah's Quay Nomads F.C. (1–0 and 3–0), Yeni Malatyaspor (3–1 and 0–1) and Molde FK(2–1 and 1–1) in the qualifiers. On 30 August, Partizan was drawn on Group L of the 2019-20 UEFA Europa League alongside Manchester United, FC Astana and AZ Alkmaar. On 19 September, Partizan opened the group stage campaign with a 2–2 home draw against AZ. Due to UEFA sanctions, this game was played behind closed doors with only U15s allowed to attend – official attendance at the game was 22,564. Partizan beat Astana (2–1 away) on matchday 2, but lost the two following games against Manchester United (0–1 in Belgrade and 3–0 in Manchester). They still managed to draw in Alkmaar against AZ (2–2) and beat Astana 4–1 at home on the last two games of the group. However, this was not enough to get through as they finished third in the group just one point behind AZ. In the SuperLiga, Partizan won second place with 14 points less than Red Star. In the Serbian Cup, Partizan defeated Red Star in the semi-finals with a score of 1–0 after the 58-th minute goal by Bibras Natcho. In the final at the Čair Stadium in Niš, they met Vojvodina. After the regular time, it was 2–2, as Partizan equalized in the last moments of the match with a spectacular goal by Strahinja Pavlović. However, Vojvodina was better after the penalty shootout with 4–2, so after a long time, Partizan finished the season without a trophy.

=== The third decade of the 21st century ===
The third decade, a new challenge Partizan debuted in the inaugural season of the newly formed competition UEFA Europa Conference League 2021–22. In Second qualifying round Partizan knocked out DAC Dunajská Streda (1–0 and 2–0). The draw for the third qualifying round decided that Partizan would face Sochi. In the first leg played on Fisht Olympic Stadium result was 1–1, in the return leg in Belgrade the two sides once more played a draw this time it was 2–2. Because of the new rule that away goals no longer count after thirty minutes of extra time the match went into penalties which Partizan won 4–2. The last opponent in the qualifying Play-off round was Portuguese Santa Clara, Partizan lost 2–1 in the first game in Ponta Delgada but won 2–0 at home and thus advanced to Group stage. Partizan was placed in Group B together with Gent, Anorthosis Famagusta and Flora. The Serbian team finished second in the group with eight points and secured a place in knockout phase. After the draws in Nyon, Sparta Prague was chosen as Partizan's next opponent, this was the first meeting between the two clubs since 1966. In the first game played on February 17, 2022, Partizan won 1–0 at Stadion Letná with a goal by Queensy Menig. Fantastic ball by Saša Zdjelar. He employed Menig, who escaped the defense and brilliantly lobbed Dominik Holec. In the second leg a week later, Partizan won 2–1 with two goals by Ricardo. And after seventeen years, Partizan reached the Round of 16 in some UEFA competition. In the round of 16, Partizan suffered a heavy defeat against Feyenoord 2–5 and 1–3, who ended up playing in the finals against Roma. In the 2021–22 Serbian SuperLiga season, Partizan finished second to Red Star after leading for most of the season. As a result, Aleksandar Stanojević resigned after two seasons without winning the domestic title.

The following 2022–23 season, Partizan finished 4th in the Serbian Superliga, which happened for the first time since 1990. As many as three coaches were changed (Ilija Stolica, Gordan Petrić, Igor Duljaj), but the results got worse and worse, until The Black & Whites fell to fourth place in a series of desperate results, which started with the unexpected elimination from Sheriff Tiraspol in the knockout phase of the UEFA Europa Conference League. After the club's worst season in the 21st century, Partizan went through a complete squad reconstruction for the 2023–24 season. The club signed eleven new players among others (Aleksandar Jovanović, Matheus Saldanha, Ghayas Zahid and Xander Severina). In the Europa Conference League qualifiers, they played against Azerbaijani team Sabah in the third round. In the first game, Sabah won 2–0, while in the second game, Partizan managed to make up for the deficit from the first game, scoring two goals in regular time, and then secured a place in the play-off round after penalties. Partizan was eliminated in the play-off round by the Danish Nordsjælland, after losing both games (0–1 at home and 0–5 away). They finished the season in second place in the Serbian SuperLiga, while in the national cup, they reached the semi-finals, where they were defeated by Red Star.

Partizan began their European journey in the 2024/25 season in the second qualifying round for the UEFA Champions League against Dynamo Kyiv. In the first game, played on 23 July 2024 in Lublin, Partizan was defeated 6–2. In the return game, played on July 31 in Belgrade, Partizan lost 3–0, losing with an aggregate score of 9–2. The team then continued their participation in the Europa League qualifiers in the third round against Swiss club Lugano. The first game, played in Belgrade on August 8, 2024, ended with a 1–0 victory for Lugano. In the second leg in Lugano on August 15, the match ended 2–2 after extra time, and Partizan was eliminated with a 3–2 aggregate score.

=== New Wave - 80th birthday - Babies 3.0 ===
Under new interim administration appointed on 22 October 2024 and confirmed on 2 June 2025, Partizan embarked on a comprehensive club rebuild project. Austerity measures and budget restrictions have been coupled with major rejuvenation of the squad, under the helm of new Head Coach Srđan Blagojević (appointed on 1 January 2025).

Partizan started season 2025 / 2026 and the European campaign with the youngest team in club and Serbian football history According to CIES audit, Partizan sits among the European clubs with the highest percentage (49%) of first-team minutes by players aged 21 and under. One of the upcoming youngsters, Partizan's 3rd captain Ognjen Ugrešić recorded his Serbia debut in Andorra on 14 October 2025, while Milan Roganović and Andrej Kostić collected their first senior caps for Montenegro.

Despite winning 4 and losing 2 games in UEFA qualifiers, Partizan's young team failed to qualify into the league stage of UEFA Conference League. Nonetheless, Srđan's Babies or Partizan Babies 3.0 have inspired the fans, boosted season-ticket sales and contributed to Partizan claiming the highest attendance in UEFA Europa League 1st qualifying round and 2nd highest average gate among all clubs in former Yugoslavia.

FK Partizan marked the 80th club anniversary on 4 October 2025 with a punk rock concert, organised at the stadium ahead of the league game against Vojvodina Novi Sad.

== Crest and colours ==
In October 1945, Partizan adopted as their first crest a blue disc with a yellow bordered red five-pointed star in the middle, which symbolized communism, and contained the abbreviation JA (Jugoslovenska Armija, The Yugoslav Army) inside it. Later on, the central circle became white with a red five-pointed star in it. It was surrounded by a larger blue circle in which the words "the Yugoslav Army" were written, while both circles were bordered by a yellow circle with a green wreath over it. At the bottom of the emblem was a shield with red and white lines, and on the top were five torches, each representing one of the five nations of Yugoslavia (Serbs, Croats, Slovenes, Macedonians and Montenegrins). This was a clear reference to the National Emblem of Yugoslavia.

Former logo from 1945 to 1947.

In the early 1950s, Partizan was separated from the Yugoslav Army and for the first time the team's name was written in the Cyrillic and Latin alphabets. The inscription of the Yugoslav Army was removed from the crest, along with the green wreath, and was replaced by the words Sportsko Društvo (Sports association). Partizan used this emblem until 1958, although it changed its equipment colors of blue and red to black and white a year before. The crest was also changed to be completely black and white, and Sportsko Društvo was amended into Jugoslovensko Sportsko Društvo (Yugoslav Sports Association), while the five red torches and the five-pointed star remained. It was slightly redesigned after 1963 by adding a sixth torch to reflect the change of the official state emblem, which now included six torches representing six Yugoslav republics, instead of the previous five representing the nations. The crest remained unchanged until the breakup of Yugoslavia.

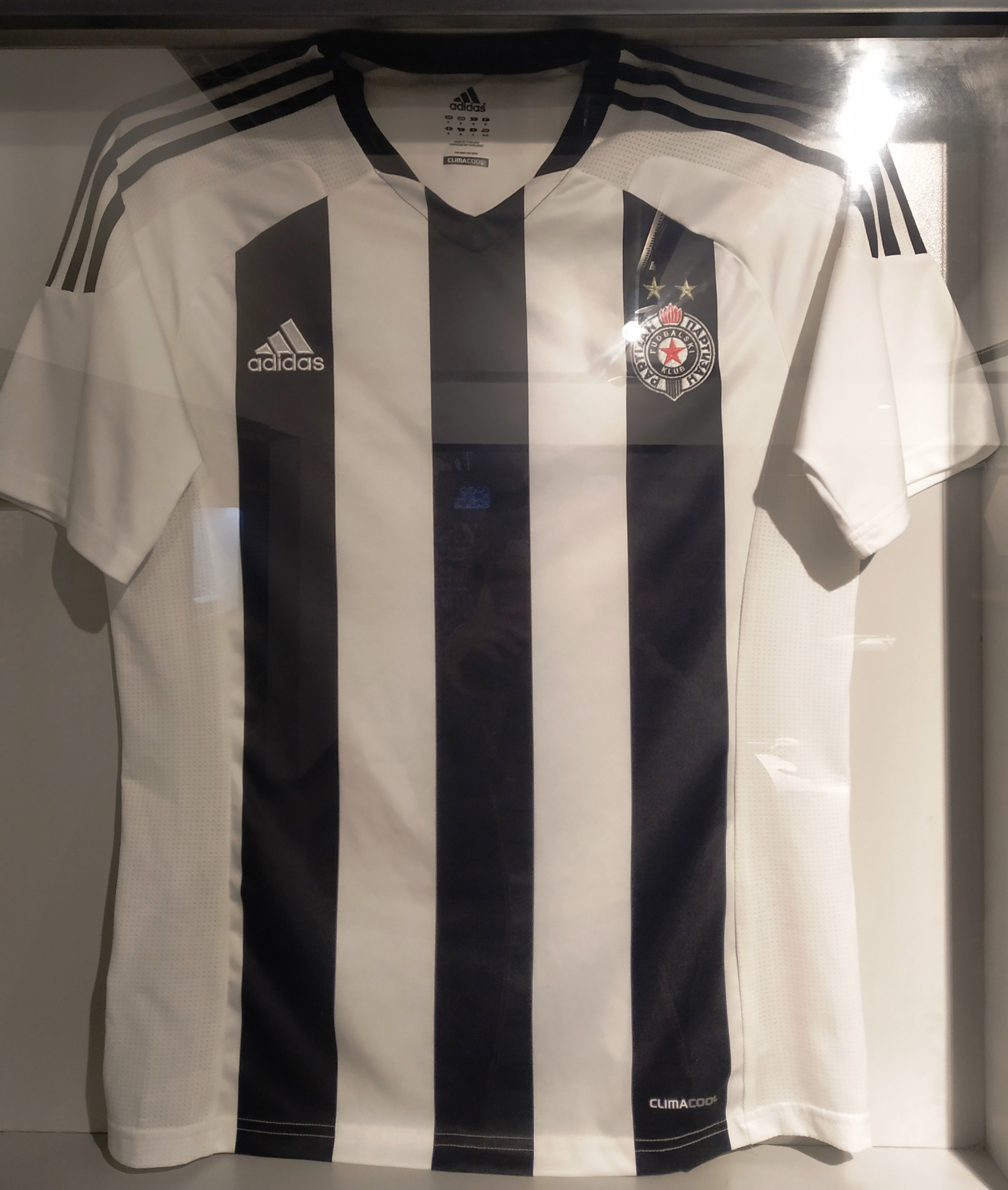
Partizan's home shirt for the 2011–12 campaign.

By 1992, with Yugoslavia fragmenting, instead of "Jugoslovensko Sportsko Društvo", the word "Fudbalski klub" ("football club") were inserted and this crest remains in use to this day. The author of the crest was academic painter Branko Šotra. In the 2007–08 season, Partizan won its 20th national championship and added two stars above their crest, symbolizing the 20 titles won. However, there is an alternative crest, which Partizan supporters call the "shovel" but it is never used in official matches.

I'm responsible because Partizan adopted black and white colors. I suggested change of shirts on behalf of the whole team, to club's general secretary Artur Takač. It all happened while we were on tour in South America, and when we played a friendly match against Juventus in 1957. We got as gift two sets of their jerseys, as they were delighted with our game. All the players were thrilled with the quality and color of the new uniforms, and they asked me to wear them all the time, which happened at the end, and Partizan's colors has remained black and white to this day.

— Stjepan Bobek, in an informal interview with the Belgrade media.

For most of its history, Partizan has played in black and white striped jerseys, but during its earliest days it used entirely dark red, blue or white jerseys. In 1950, Partizan briefly had an all-white shirt with a blue diagonal stripe, besides an all blue shirt. From 1952, the first red-blue striped and quartered jerseys appeared. In 1957, the club was on tour in South America and after a friendly game with Juventus, a president of the Italian club, Umberto Agnelli, donated the club two sets of black and white jerseys. Since then, Partizan has played mainly in black and white striped shirts, with black or white shorts and socks. But there were exceptions, like in 1974, when they wore a black and white hooped shirt, and 1982, when they have played in a plain white jerseys with a thick black stripe across them. In 1990, the red and blue jersey returned after more than 30 years, in an away match against Hibernians during the UEFA Cup campaign. All this time, the away shirts have been mostly either all white or occasionally red-blue striped, but in recent years an all-black strip is usually used.

== Stadium and training ground ==
The stadium's name is Partizan Stadium, although it was known as JNA Stadium (Serbian: Стадион Југословенске народне армије, romanized: Stadion JNA (Stadion Jugoslovenske narodne armije), (Yugoslav People's Army Stadium) for most of its history, and even today, a lot of football fans in all countries of the former-Yugoslavia call it by its old name. Partizan supporters sometimes call it "Fudbalski hram" (The Temple of Football).

The stadium is situated in the Savski Venac municipality, in central Belgrade. Designed by architect Mihailo Janković, the ground was built on the site of BSK Stadium. It was officially opened on Day of Yugoslav People's Army on 22 December 1951. The first match ever played was between Yugoslavia and France on 9 October 1949. The stadium had a capacity of 55,000 until it was renovated in 1998 following UEFA security regulations. This led to the conversion of the stadium into an all-seater reducing the capacity to 32.710, currently the second largest stadium in Serbia, behind the Red Star Stadium.

The ground has also been used for a variety of other sport events since 1949. It was used from the mid-fifties until 1987 as the final point of yearly festivities called the Youth Day. Also, it was the host of the 1962 European Athletics Championships, a place for various concerts and it hosted many times the Yugoslav Cup and Serbian Cup final.

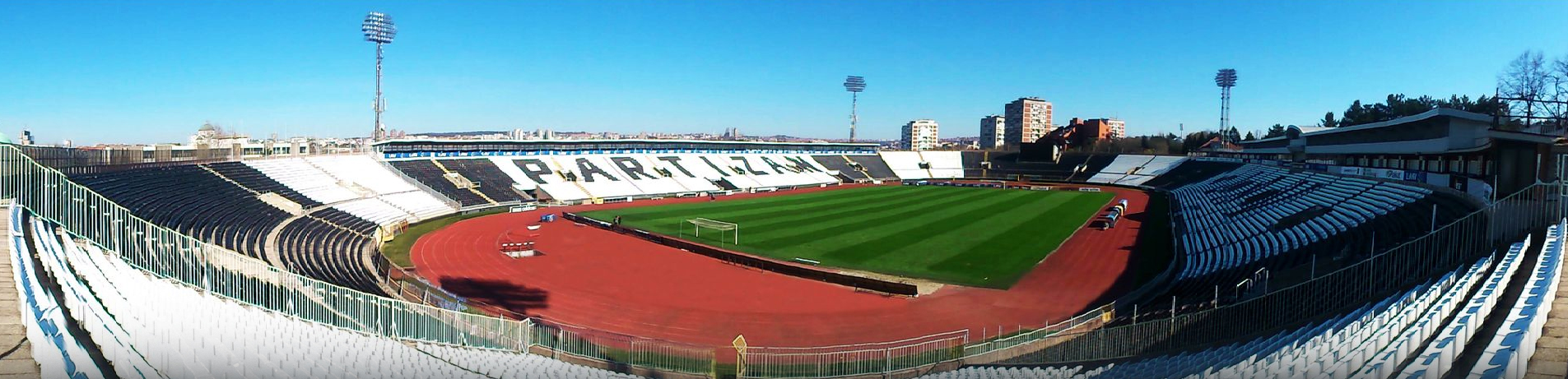
A panorama of Partizan Stadium from the north stand.

== Partizan youth school and affiliates ==
The Partizan youth school, called Youth School Belin – Lazarević – Nadoveza, was founded in the 1950s and named after former Partizan players Bruno Belin, Čedomir Lazarević and Branko Nadoveza. The club is well known for its dedicated work with youngsters. Its training philosophy is not only the development of football players, but also to care of their growth and personality forming, while also teaching the sporting spirit. There are around 400 youngsters classified by age categories. There are six age groups, four compete at the level of the Football Association of Serbia, the U17, U16, U15 and U14, while the U13 and U12 compete at the level of the Football Association of Belgrade. Below U12 level there are no official competitions, but players do play in tournaments and friendly matches.

Partizan is the club with the most league titles and cup wins in youth competition in Serbia. The youth teams also participate in numerous tournaments around Europe and also organize an U17 international tournament with participation of some of the top European clubs. Partizan also organizes football camps for children in Serbia, Montenegro, Bosnia and Herzegovina, Slovenia, Australia and the United States. Many of the best youth-academy players move directly to the Partizan senior side, or to the affiliate club Teleoptik Zemun.

All of Partizan's youth categories train at the Partizan sports complex named SC Partizan-Teleoptik, along with Partizan's seniors and the players of Teleoptik. Partizan has won several awards for its youth work, including "Best European Youth Work" in 2006, and the club's youth school has been declared the second-best in Europe after that of Ajax. Partizan's academy has produced numerous professional football players or Yugoslav and Serbian internationals. Notable players from the recent past include Saša Ilić, Savo Milošević, Danko Lazović, Stefan Babović, Miralem Sulejmani, Stevan Jovetić, Adem Ljajić, Matija Nastasić, Lazar Marković, Miloš Jojić, Andrija Živković, Nikola Milenković, Aleksandar Mitrović, Strahinja Pavlović and Dušan Vlahović.

Two Partizan youth academy graduates (Dušan Vlahović and Strahinja Pavlović) are featured in UEFA.com 'Fifty for the Future' selection in 2020.

Recently, players born after year 2000 like Filip Stevanović, Marko Milovanović and Samed Baždar (who made it into the Guardian's 'Next Generation 2021' shortlist') have gained recognition.

== Supporters ==
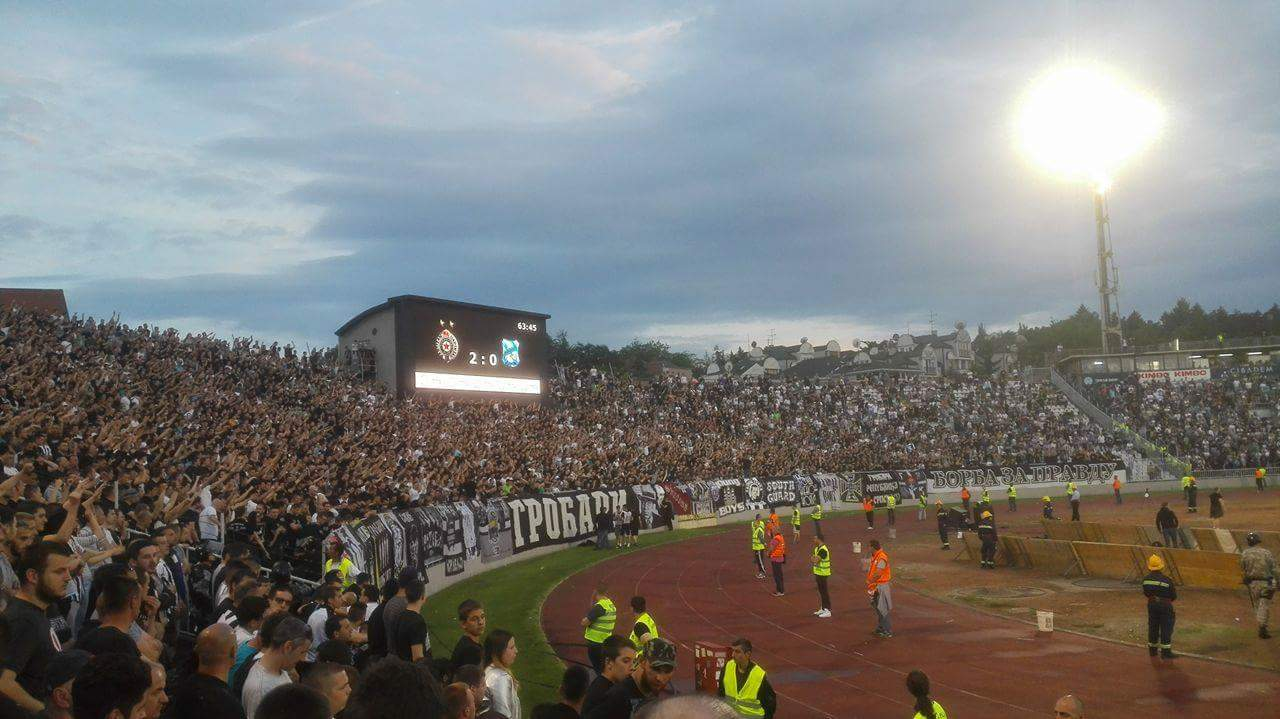
Grobari celebrating Partizan's 27th league title won in 2017

According to a 2008 domestic poll, Partizan is the second popular football club in Serbia, behind Red Star Belgrade. Although fewer, focus groups show that Partizan fans are considered to be more devoted to their club. The club has a large fanbase in Montenegro, Bosnia and Herzegovina (especially in the Serb entity of Republika Srpska). They also have many supporters in all other former-Yugoslav republics like North Macedonia, Slovenia, and among the Serbian diaspora, especially in Germany, Austria, Switzerland, Sweden, Canada, Malta, the United States and Australia.

The organized supporters of Partizan are called Grobari ("The Gravediggers" or "Undertakers"), which were formed in 1970 and situated mainly on the south stand of the Partizan Stadium; therefore, they are also known as Grobari Jug ("The Undertakers South"). Even some ordinary Partizan fans often refer to themselves as Grobari. The nickname itself was given by their sporting rivals Delije of Red Star, referring to the club's mostly black colours which were similar to the official uniforms of cemetery undertakers. The other theory is that the name comes from a misinterpretation of the name of the street on which Partizan's stadium is located – "Humska" ("humka" roughly translates as "grave" or "entombment"), when actually the street was named after Serbian medieval land of Hum, nowadays part of Herzegovina and South Dalmatia. The Grobari support all clubs in the Partizan Sports Association and in the course of time they have become recognizable by their noisy and constant cheering as well as their devotion and loyalty to the club. The basis of their cheering is referred in the Serbian fan scene as the principle of "srce, ruke, glas" (heart, hands, voice) or "glas i dlan" (voice and palms), along with songs in distinctive style. The Grobari as a whole maintain a close friendship with the organized supporters of PAOK, CSKA Moscow and CSKA Sofia, which started originally because of the two supporters' common Orthodox faith and similar founding backgrounds. It has been suggested that "many ultras took part in the armed conflicts and carry their scars today, translating the tribal nature of the Yugoslav wars to their clubs and ultras groups".

Grobari have also a traditional friendship with Juventude Leonina, the main ultras group of Portuguese side Sporting Clube de Portugal. The direction boards of both clubs have also good relations which was kept ever since the 1955–56 European Cup edition, which on 4 September 1955, in Lisbon's Estádio Nacional, put head-a-head the two teams in what was considered the opening whistle of the UEFA European club competitions. The game finished with a 3–3 draw, with Sporting later losing in Belgrade in the second hand by 5–2, however the club boards of both teams regularly meet from time to time to mark the occasion of this historic event.

== Rivalries ==
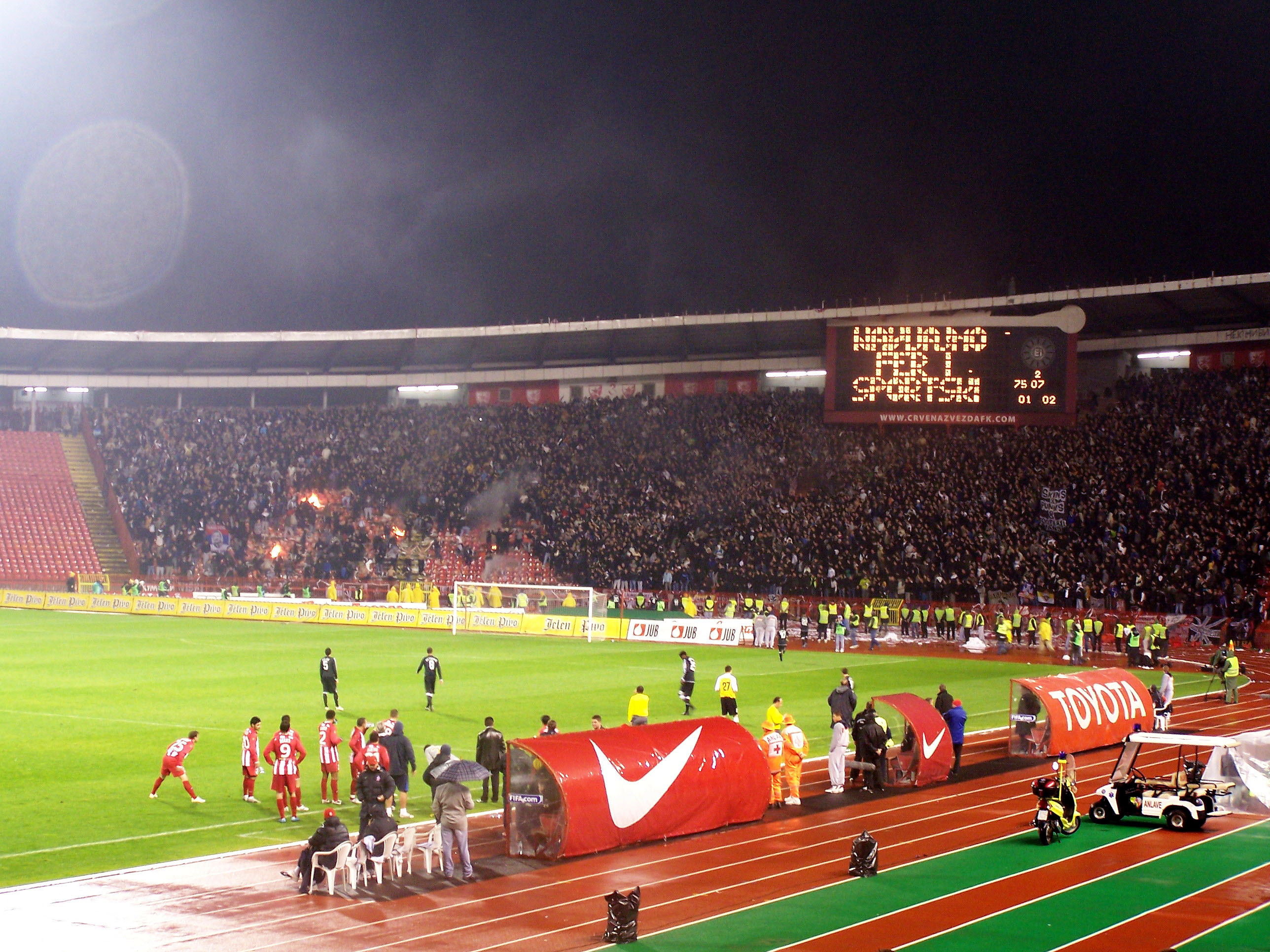
Red Star – Partizan match

Partizan's biggest rivalry is with Red Star Belgrade. The matches between these rivals have been labeled as the Eternal derby (Serbian: Вечити дерби, Večiti derbi) or Belgrade derby. The rivalry started immediately after the creation of the two clubs. Red Star was founded for Yugoslav youth and Partizan as the football section of the Yugoslav People's Army. The rivalry is also intensified by the fact that both clubs have their stadiums situated only a few hundred metres apart. The Eternal derby is particularly noted for the passion of both supporters groups. The stands of both teams feature fireworks, coloured confetti, flags, rolls of paper, torches, smoke, drums, giant posters and choreographies, used to create visual grandeur and apply psychological pressure on the visiting teams. Both sets of supporters sing passionate songs against their rivals, and the stadiums are known to bounce with the simultaneous jumping of the fans.

The duel is regarded by Bleacher Report as one of the greatest football rivalries in the world. Along with the Old Firm, the Rome derby and the Istanbul derby, the Belgrade derby is known as one of the most intense rivalries in European football. The largest attendance at a derby match was about 100,000 spectators (90,142 with paid tickets) on 7 November 1976 at the Red Star Stadium. The biggest win was 7–1 for Partizan on 6 December 1953 at the Partizan Stadium but the club with the most victories is Red Star.

During the Yugoslav era between 1945 and 1991, Partizan maintained a rivalry with other members of the so called "big four". Along with Partizan and Red Star, the "big four" included Dinamo Zagreb and Hajduk Split. Results in the table include domestic championship and cup games Partizan played against other members of the Yugoslav "big four" up to and including the season 1990–91:

Against	Wins	Draws	Defeats	Goal difference
Red Star	48	58	73	210:257
Dinamo Zagreb	40	23	37	153:156
Hajduk Split	45	23	25	157:110
Total	133	104	135	520:523

Other rivalries include regional rivalry with Vojvodina with whom they contest the Derby of Serbia, minor derby with neighbouring Zemun, and Belgrade derbies with Rad and OFK Belgrade.

== Partizan in European football ==
Partizan's best European performance was in the 1965–66 season, when they reached the final of the European Cup.

=== UEFA coefficient ===
Correct as of 1 July 2025.

Rank	Team	Points
83	(Germany) 1. FC Union Berlin	23.000
84	(Romania) FCSB	22.500
85	(Serbia) Partizan	22.000
86	(Belgium) Royal Antwerp FC	20.500
87	(France) OGC Nice	20.000

== Honours ==
Overall, Partizan have won 46 official titles including 27 national championships, 16 national cups, 1 national supercup, 1 national champions league and 1 Mitropa Cup.

=== Domestic competitions (45) ===
==== League – 27 ====
- Yugoslav First League
  - Winners (11): 1946–47, 1948–49, 1960–61, 1961–62, 1962–63, 1964–65, 1975–76, 1977–78, 1982–83, 1985–86, 1986–87
- First League of FR Yugoslavia / First League of Serbia and Montenegro (record)
  - Winners (8): 1992–93, 1993–94, 1995–96, 1996–97, 1998–99, 2001–02, 2002–03, 2004–05
- Serbian SuperLiga
  - Winners (8): 2007–08, 2008–09, 2009–10, 2010–11, 2011–12, 2012–13, 2014–15, 2016–17

==== Cups – 16 ====
- Yugoslav Cup
  - Winners (6): 1946–47, 1951–52, 1953–54, 1956–57, 1988–89, 1991–92
- FR Yugoslavia Cup
  - Winners (3): 1993–94, 1997–98, 2000–01
- Serbian Cup
  - Winners (7): 2007–08, 2008–09, 2010–11, 2015–16, 2016–17, 2017–18, 2018–19

==== Super cups – 1 ====
- Yugoslav Super Cup
  - Winners (1): 1989

==== National Champions League – 1 ====
- Yugoslav Summer Champions League
  - Winners (1): 1969

=== International competitions (1) ===
- Mitropa Cup
  - Winners (1): 1978
- European Cup / UEFA Champions League
  - Runners up (1): 1965–66

=== Friendly tournaments (12) ===
- Kvarnerska Rivijera (4): 1959, 1965, 1966, 1991
- Mohammed V Cup (1): 1963
- Torneo Pentagonal Internacional de la Ciudad de México (1): 1970
- Torneo Pentagonal Internacional de la Ciudad de Bogotá (1): 1971
- Trofeo Colombino de fútbol (1): 1976
- Lunar New Year Cup (1): 1984
- 40th Anniversary FK Partizan (1): 1985
- Uhrencup (1): 1989
- Blue Stars/FIFA Youth Cup (1): 2007

== Club records ==
Partizan's record-holder by number of appearances is player Saša Ilić. He played 874 games in two turns, from 1996 and 2005 and from 2010 till 2019. The goal-scoring record-holder is striker Stjepan Bobek, with 425 goals. Over 150 footballers from Partizan have played for the Yugoslav and Serbian national football teams. Stjepan Bobek held the Yugoslavian national team record with 38 goals, with second place being shared by Savo Milošević, Milan Galić and Blagoje Marjanović, who scored 37 goals each. Aleksandar Mitrović holds the Serbian national team record with 64 goals as of late 2021, this means four out of five national team top goalscorers have been Partizan players.

Partizan are record-holders of the Yugoslav First League in terms of points acquired during a campaign, with 107, and are the only league-winning team to have gone undefeated during one season (in 2005 and 2010). Partizan became the first champion of Yugoslavia in 1947, the first Yugoslav Cup winner, also in 1947, and therefore also the first double winner in the country. They won three consecutive championship titles, in 1961, 1962 and 1963, the first title hat-trick in the history of the Yugoslav First League. Partizan won the most national championships since the dissolution of Yugoslavia, becoming champions 13 times. They are the only Serbian club ever, since the first nationwide domestic football competition in 1923, to win six consecutive national titles, a feat they achieved between 2007 and 2013.

The club holds records such as playing in the first European Champions Cup match in 1955, becoming the first Balkan and Eastern European club to play in the European Champions Cup final in 1966, and becoming the first club from Serbia to take part in the UEFA Champions League group stages in 2003. The club's greatest victory in European competitions was 8–0 against Welsh champions Rhyl in qualifying for the 2009–10 UEFA Champions League.

=== Record transfers ===
Rank	Player	To	Fee	Year
1.	(Serbia and Montenegro) Mateja Kežman	(Netherlands) PSV Eindhoven	€14.00 million	2000
2.	(Montenegro) Stefan Savić	(England) Manchester City	€12.00 million	2011
3.	(Serbia) Strahinja Pavlović	(France) Monaco	€10.00 million	2019
3.	(Serbia) Lazar Marković	(Portugal) Benfica	€10.00 million	2013
4.	(Nigeria) Umar Sadiq	(Spain) Almería	€9.00 million	2020
5.	(Serbia) Filip Stevanović	(England) Manchester City	€8.50 million	2020
6.	(Montenegro) Stevan Jovetić	(Italy) Fiorentina	€8.00 million	2008
7.	(Serbia) Zoran Tošić	(England) Manchester United	€7.00 million	2008
7.	(Serbia and Montenegro) Danko Lazović	(Netherlands) Feyenoord	€7.00 million	2003
8.	(Serbia) Adem Ljajić	(Italy) Fiorentina	€6.80 million	2009
9.	(Serbia) Ognjen Ugrešić	(Greece) PAOK	€6.00 million	2026
10.	(Serbia) Vanja Dragojević	(Scotland) Rangers	€5.50 million	2026
10.	(Serbia) Nikola Milenković	(Italy) Fiorentina	€5.50 million	2017

*-unofficial fee

== Players ==
=== Current squad ===
As of 3 September 2026

Note: Flags indicate national team as defined under FIFA eligibility rules; some limited exceptions apply. Players may hold more than one non-FIFA nationality.

No.	Pos.	Nation	Player
1	GK	SRB	Marko Milošević
4	DF	SLO	Mario Jurčević
5	DF	SRB	Mateja Milovanović
7	MF	CIV	Chaka Traorè
8	MF	MNE	Aleks Zeković
9	FW	AUT	Erik Kojzek (on loan from Wolfsberger AC)
10	MF	SRB	Igor Miladinović (on loan from AS Saint-Étienne)
11	MF	MNE	Milan Vukotić (vice-captain)
14	MF	GHA	Iddrisu Baba
17	MF	SRB	Milan Aleksić (on loan from Sunderland)
19	MF	SEN	Demba Seck
20	DF	NGR	Samson Nwulu
21	DF	BRA	Sidney Lima (on loan from Santa Clara)
23	DF	SRB	Stefan Mitrović
24	DF	SRB	Vukašin Đurđević
27	MF	SRB	Nikola Čumić

No.	Pos.	Nation	Player
31	GK	SRB	Miloš Krunić
32	MF	SRB	Nemanja Trifunović
33	DF	SRB	Stefan Petrović
39	MF	GHA	Ibrahim Zubairu
40	DF	SRB	Nikola Simić (captain)
41	GK	BIH	Tarik Banjić
42	MF	SRB	Matija Ninić
44	DF	MNE	Stefan Milić
46	FW	SRB	Marko Lekić
50	DF	SRB	Milan Lazarević
66	DF	SRB	Vojin Marinković
79	MF	SRB	Dušan Jovanović
88	MF	SRB	Dušan Makević
89	FW	BRA	Jeh (on loan from Göztepe)
90	MF	SRB	Zoran Alilović
99	MF	SRB	Bogdan Kostić

=== Players with multiple nationalities ===
- (Serbia) (Bosnia and Herzegovina) Marko Milošević
- (Serbia) (Bosnia and Herzegovina) Milan Lazarević
- (Serbia) (Netherlands) Mateja Milovanović
- (Montenegro) (Serbia) Milan Vukotić
- (Montenegro) (Serbia) Stefan Milić
- (Montenegro) (France) Aleks Zeković
- (Austria) (Slovenia) Erik Kojzek
- (Ghana) (Serbia) Ibrahim Zubairu
- (Ghana) (Spain) Iddrisu Baba

=== Other players on contract ===
Note: Flags indicate national team as defined under FIFA eligibility rules; some limited exceptions apply. Players may hold more than one non-FIFA nationality.

No.	Pos.	Nation	Player
—	DF	SRB	Vanja Đorđević
—	MF	SRB	Mihajlo Petković

=== On dual registration ===
Note: Flags indicate national team as defined under FIFA eligibility rules; some limited exceptions apply. Players may hold more than one non-FIFA nationality.

No.	Pos.	Nation	Player
42	MF	SRB	Matija Ninić (with Teleoptik until the end of the 2026–27 season)
66	DF	SRB	Vojin Marinković (with Teleoptik until the end of the 2026–27 season)

No.	Pos.	Nation	Player
79	MF	SRB	Dušan Jovanović (with Teleoptik until the end of the 2026–27 season)
88	MF	SRB	Dušan Makević (with Teleoptik until the end of the 2026–27 season)

=== Out on loan ===
Note: Flags indicate national team as defined under FIFA eligibility rules; some limited exceptions apply. Players may hold more than one non-FIFA nationality.

No.	Pos.	Nation	Player
12	GK	SRB	Veljko Popović (on loan at (Serbia) Teleoptik)
13	DF	NGR	Abdulmalik Mohammed (on loan at (Serbia) Teleoptik)
16	MF	GHA	Leonard Owusu (on loan at (Norway) Fredrikstad)
26	DF	SRB	Mihailo Radić (on loan at (Spain) Almería B)
70	MF	SRB	Dimitrije Janković (on loan at (Serbia) Novi Pazar)
77	FW	SRB	Ivan Martinović (on loan at (Serbia) Teleoptik)

No.	Pos.	Nation	Player
—	DF	SRB	Nikola Popović (on loan at (Serbia) Teleoptik)
—	DF	SRB	Danilo Bulatović (on loan at (Serbia) Teleoptik)
—	MF	SRB	Sergej Mladenović (on loan at (Serbia) Teleoptik)
—	MF	SRB	Duško Janačković (on loan at (Serbia) Teleoptik)
—	FW	SRB	Stefan Đurović (on loan at (Serbia) Teleoptik)

== Technical staff ==
As of 10 August 2026

Current technical staff
- Head coach: (Serbia) Saša Ilić
- Assistant coach: (Serbia) Veličko Kaplanović
- Assistant coach: (Serbia) Ljubiša Ranković
- Assistant coach: (Serbia) Goran Vuković
- Assistant coach: (Serbia) Darko Obradović
- Goalkeeper coach: (Serbia) Nemanja Jovšić
- Analyst coach: (Serbia) Stefan Petrović
- Conditioning coach: (Serbia) Miša Filipović
- Conditioning coach: (Slovakia) Jaroslav Imrek
- Economist: (Serbia) Rade Vučićević
- Economist: (Serbia) Darko Milićev
- Doctor first team: (Serbia) Dr Sead Malićević
- Doctor first team: (Serbia) Dr Marko Ličanin
- Physiotherapist: (Serbia) Dušan Nikolić
- Physiotherapist: (Serbia) Miloš Garić
- Physiotherapist: (Serbia) Stefan Dimitrov
- Secretary technical staff: (Serbia) Milan Milijaš

=== Notable players ===
To appear in this section a player must have played at least 80 matches for the club or made at least one international appearance.

Flags indicate the national teams the players played for. Players that played for two different national teams have the flags of both national teams.

- (Socialist Federal Republic of Yugoslavia) Radomir Antić
- (Socialist Federal Republic of Yugoslavia) Aleksandar Atanacković
- (Serbia) Stefan Babović
- (Socialist Federal Republic of Yugoslavia) Mane Bajić
- (Socialist Federal Republic of Yugoslavia) Miodrag Bajović
- (Socialist Federal Republic of Yugoslavia) Zoran Batrović
- (Socialist Federal Republic of Yugoslavia) Radoslav Bečejac
- (Serbia) Kristijan Belić
- (Socialist Federal Republic of Yugoslavia) Bruno Belin
- (Socialist Federal Republic of Yugoslavia) Nenad Bjeković
- (Socialist Federal Republic of Yugoslavia) Stjepan Bobek
- (Socialist Federal Republic of Yugoslavia) Goran Bogdanović
- (Serbia) Miloš Bogunović
- (Serbia) Miroslav Bogosavac
- (Serbia and Montenegro) Dražen Bolić
- (Socialist Federal Republic of Yugoslavia) Petar Borota
- (Socialist Federal Republic of Yugoslavia) Miroslav Bošković
- (Serbia) Darko Brašanac
- (Socialist Federal Republic of Yugoslavia) (Serbia and Montenegro) Branko Brnović
- (Socialist Federal Republic of Yugoslavia) Dragoljub Brnović
- (Serbia and Montenegro) Nenad Brnović
- (Socialist Federal Republic of Yugoslavia) (Bosnia and Herzegovina) Miroslav Brozović
- (Socialist Federal Republic of Yugoslavia) Nikola Budišić
- (Socialist Federal Republic of Yugoslavia) (Croatia) Zlatko Čajkovski
- (Serbia and Montenegro) Damir Čakar
- (Socialist Federal Republic of Yugoslavia) Vlado Čapljić
- (Socialist Federal Republic of Yugoslavia) Srđan Čebinac
- (Socialist Federal Republic of Yugoslavia) Zvezdan Čebinac
- (Socialist Federal Republic of Yugoslavia) Ratko Čolić
- (Serbia and Montenegro) Dragan Ćirić
- (Serbia and Montenegro) Milivoje Ćirković
- (Serbia and Montenegro) Saša Ćurčić
- (Socialist Federal Republic of Yugoslavia) Ivan Ćurković
- (Socialist Federal Republic of Yugoslavia) Milan Damjanović
- (Serbia) Aleksandar Davidov
- (Serbia) Vanja Dragojević
- (Socialist Federal Republic of Yugoslavia) Božidar Drenovac
- (Serbia and Montenegro) Ljubinko Drulović
- (Serbia and Montenegro) (Serbia) Igor Duljaj
- (Socialist Federal Republic of Yugoslavia) Miloš Đelmaš
- (Socialist Federal Republic of Yugoslavia) Borivoje Đorđević
- (Socialist Federal Republic of Yugoslavia) Boško Đorđević
- (Serbia and Montenegro) Nenad Đorđević
- (Socialist Federal Republic of Yugoslavia) Svemir Đorđić
- (Socialist Federal Republic of Yugoslavia) Vladislav Đukić
- (Socialist Federal Republic of Yugoslavia) Borislav Đurović
- (Socialist Federal Republic of Yugoslavia) (North Macedonia) Milko Đurovski
- (Serbia) Ljubomir Fejsa
- (Serbia) Aleksandar Filipović
- (Socialist Federal Republic of Yugoslavia) Vladimir Firm
- (Socialist Federal Republic of Yugoslavia) Milan Galić
- (Socialist Federal Republic of Yugoslavia) Franjo Glazer
- (Socialist Federal Republic of Yugoslavia) Ivan Golac
- (Socialist Federal Republic of Yugoslavia) Pavle Grubješić
- (Serbia and Montenegro) Nebojša Gudelj
- (Socialist Federal Republic of Yugoslavia) Mustafa Hasanagić
- (Socialist Federal Republic of Yugoslavia) Jusuf Hatunić
- (Socialist Federal Republic of Yugoslavia) Antun Herceg
- (Socialist Federal Republic of Yugoslavia) Edvard Hočevar
- (Socialist Federal Republic of Yugoslavia) Idriz Hošić
- (Serbia) Brana Ilić
- (Serbia) Radiša Ilić
- (Serbia and Montenegro) (Serbia) Saša Ilić
- (Serbia and Montenegro) Ivica Iliev
- (Serbia) Đorđe Ivanović
- (Serbia and Montenegro) Vladimir Ivić
- (Socialist Federal Republic of Yugoslavia) Lajoš Jakovetić
- (Serbia and Montenegro) Dragoljub Jeremić
- (Socialist Federal Republic of Yugoslavia) Miodrag Ješić
- (Serbia) Marko Jevtović
- (Socialist Federal Republic of Yugoslavia) Jovan Jezerkić
- (Socialist Federal Republic of Yugoslavia) Stanoje Jocić
- (Serbia) Miloš Jojić
- (Socialist Federal Republic of Yugoslavia) (Serbia and Montenegro) Slaviša Jokanović
- (Serbia) Aleksandar Jovanović
- (Serbia) Marko Jovanović
- (Socialist Federal Republic of Yugoslavia) Miodrag Jovanović
- (Serbia) Nemanja Jović
- (Socialist Federal Republic of Yugoslavia) Fahrudin Jusufi
- (Socialist Federal Republic of Yugoslavia) Dragi Kaličanin
- (Socialist Federal Republic of Yugoslavia) Tomislav Kaloperović
- (Socialist Federal Republic of Yugoslavia) (Slovenia) Srečko Katanec
- (Socialist Federal Republic of Yugoslavia) Ilija Katić
- (Serbia and Montenegro) Mateja Kežman
- (Socialist Federal Republic of Yugoslavia) Nikica Klinčarski
- (Socialist Federal Republic of Yugoslavia) Božidar Kolaković
- (Socialist Federal Republic of Yugoslavia) Vladica Kovačević
- (Socialist Federal Republic of Yugoslavia) Refik Kozić
- (Serbia and Montenegro) Ivica Kralj
- (Serbia and Montenegro) (Serbia) Mladen Krstajić
- (Socialist Federal Republic of Yugoslavia) Rešad Kunovac
- (Socialist Federal Republic of Yugoslavia) Čedomir Lazarević
- (Serbia and Montenegro) (Serbia) Danko Lazović
- (Serbia) Marko Lomić
- (Serbia) Milan Lukač
- (Serbia) Saša Lukić
- (Serbia) Adem Ljajić
- (Socialist Federal Republic of Yugoslavia) Dragan Mance
- (Serbia and Montenegro) Nikola Malbaša
- (Serbia) Lazar Marković
- (Serbia) Saša Marković
- (Serbia) Svetozar Marković
- (Socialist Federal Republic of Yugoslavia) Florijan Matekalo
- (Socialist Federal Republic of Yugoslavia) Branislav Mihajlović
- (Socialist Federal Republic of Yugoslavia) Ljubomir Mihajlović
- (Socialist Federal Republic of Yugoslavia) Prvoslav Mihajlović
- (Socialist Federal Republic of Yugoslavia) (Serbia and Montenegro) Bratislav Mijalković
- (Socialist Federal Republic of Yugoslavia) (Serbia and Montenegro) Predrag Mijatović
- (Socialist Federal Republic of Yugoslavia) Jovan Miladinović
- (Socialist Federal Republic of Yugoslavia) (Slovenia) Darko Milanič
- (Serbia) Nikola Milenković
- (Serbia) Nemanja G. Miletić
- (Serbia) Nemanja R. Miletić
- (Socialist Federal Republic of Yugoslavia) Goran Milojević
- (Serbia and Montenegro) (Serbia) Savo Milošević
- (Serbia) Milovan Milović
- (Serbia) Aleksandar Mitrović
- (Socialist Federal Republic of Yugoslavia) Bora Milutinović
- (Socialist Federal Republic of Yugoslavia) Milorad Milutinović
- (Socialist Federal Republic of Yugoslavia) Miloš Milutinović
- (Serbia) Aleksandar Miljković
- (Serbia and Montenegro) Zoran Mirković
- (Serbia and Montenegro) Albert Nađ
- (Serbia) Nemanja Nikolić
- (Serbia) Nikola Ninković
- (Socialist Federal Republic of Yugoslavia) (Slovenia) Džoni Novak
- (Serbia and Montenegro) Goran Obradović
- (Serbia) Ivan Obradović
- (Serbia) Bojan Ostojić
- (Serbia) Ognjen Ožegović
- (Serbia and Montenegro) (Montenegro) Dejan Ognjanović
- (Socialist Federal Republic of Yugoslavia) (Bosnia and Herzegovina) Fahrudin Omerović
- (Socialist Federal Republic of Yugoslavia) Bela Palfi
- (Serbia and Montenegro) Goran Pandurović
- (Serbia) Danilo Pantić
- (Serbia and Montenegro) Milinko Pantić
- (Socialist Federal Republic of Yugoslavia) Blagoje Paunović
- (Serbia and Montenegro) Veljko Paunović
- (Serbia and Montenegro) Gordan Petrić
- (Serbia) Strahinja Pavlović
- (Serbia) Radosav Petrović
- (Socialist Federal Republic of Yugoslavia) Slobodan Petrović
- (Socialist Federal Republic of Yugoslavia) Vlada Pejović
- (Socialist Federal Republic of Yugoslavia) Josip Pirmajer
- (Serbia) Aleksandar Popović
- (Socialist Federal Republic of Yugoslavia) Dževad Prekazi
- (Socialist Federal Republic of Yugoslavia) Miloš Radaković
- (Serbia and Montenegro) Radovan Radaković
- (Socialist Federal Republic of Yugoslavia) Ljubomir Radanović
- (Socialist Federal Republic of Yugoslavia) Lazar Radović
- (Serbia) Miroslav Radović
- (Socialist Federal Republic of Yugoslavia) Miodrag Radović
- (Serbia and Montenegro) Ljubiša Ranković
- (Socialist Federal Republic of Yugoslavia) Branko Rašović
- (Serbia and Montenegro) Vuk Rašović
- (Serbia and Montenegro) (Serbia) Nemanja Rnić
- (Socialist Federal Republic of Yugoslavia) Slobodan Rojević
- (Serbia) Antonio Rukavina
- (Serbia and Montenegro) Zoltan Sabo
- (Socialist Federal Republic of Yugoslavia) Slobodan Santrač
- (Serbia and Montenegro) Niša Saveljić
- (Serbia and Montenegro) Branko Savić
- (Socialist Federal Republic of Yugoslavia) Božidar Senčar
- (Socialist Federal Republic of Yugoslavia) (North Macedonia) Kiril Simonovski
- (Socialist Federal Republic of Yugoslavia) (Bosnia and Herzegovina) Admir Smajić
- (Serbia) Milan Smiljanić
- (Socialist Federal Republic of Yugoslavia) Velimir Sombolac
- (Socialist Federal Republic of Yugoslavia) Predrag Spasić
- (Serbia) Vojislav Stanković
- (Socialist Federal Republic of Yugoslavia) (North Macedonia) Vujadin Stanojković
- (Serbia) Alen Stevanović
- (Socialist Federal Republic of Yugoslavia) Goran Stevanović
- (Serbia) Filip Stevanović
- (Socialist Federal Republic of Yugoslavia) Slavko Stojanović
- (Socialist Federal Republic of Yugoslavia) Ranko Stojić
- (Socialist Federal Republic of Yugoslavia) Nenad Stojković
- (Serbia) Vladimir Stojković
- (Serbia) Miralem Sulejmani
- (Serbia and Montenegro) Đorđe Svetličić
- (Serbia) Bojan Šaranov
- (Socialist Federal Republic of Yugoslavia) Slađan Šćepović
- (Serbia) Marko Šćepović
- (Serbia) Stefan Šćepović
- (Serbia) Petar Škuletić
- (Socialist Federal Republic of Yugoslavia) Milutin Šoškić
- (Socialist Federal Republic of Yugoslavia) Franjo Šoštarić
- (Serbia and Montenegro) Igor Taševski
- (Serbia and Montenegro) Darko Tešović
- (Serbia and Montenegro) Đorđe Tomić
- (Serbia and Montenegro) Ivan Tomić
- (Serbia) Nemanja Tomić
- (Serbia) Zoran Tošić
- (Socialist Federal Republic of Yugoslavia) Aco Trifunović
- (Serbia and Montenegro) Goran Trobok
- (Serbia) Ognjen Ugrešić
- (Serbia) Slobodan Urošević
- (Socialist Federal Republic of Yugoslavia) Zvonko Varga
- (Socialist Federal Republic of Yugoslavia) Marko Valok
- (Socialist Federal Republic of Yugoslavia) Joakim Vislavski
- (Socialist Federal Republic of Yugoslavia) Velibor Vasović
- (Socialist Federal Republic of Yugoslavia) Vladimir Vermezović
- (Socialist Federal Republic of Yugoslavia) Fadil Vokrri
- (Serbia) Dušan Vlahović
- (Serbia) (Montenegro) Vladimir Volkov
- (Socialist Federal Republic of Yugoslavia) Nebojša Vučićević
- (Socialist Federal Republic of Yugoslavia) (Serbia and Montenegro) Budimir Vujačić
- (Serbia and Montenegro) (Montenegro) Simon Vukčević
- (Socialist Federal Republic of Yugoslavia) Milan Vukelić
- (Serbia and Montenegro) Zvonimir Vukić
- (Socialist Federal Republic of Yugoslavia) Todor Veselinović
- (Socialist Federal Republic of Yugoslavia) Momčilo Vukotić
- (Serbia) Miroslav Vulićević
- (Socialist Federal Republic of Yugoslavia) Ilija Zavišić
- (Serbia) Saša Zdjelar
- (Socialist Federal Republic of Yugoslavia) Branko Zebec
- (Socialist Federal Republic of Yugoslavia) Miodrag Živaljević
- (Serbia) Andrija Živković
- (Socialist Federal Republic of Yugoslavia) Zvonko Živković
- (Socialist Federal Republic of Yugoslavia) Bajro Župić

=== Notable foreign players ===
To appear in this section a player must have played at least 30 matches for the club or made at least one international appearance.

Flags indicate the national teams the players played for. Players that played for two different national teams have the flags of both national teams.

- (Bosnia and Herzegovina) Branimir Bajić
- (Bosnia and Herzegovina) Samed Baždar
- (Bosnia and Herzegovina) Stefan Kovač
- (Bosnia and Herzegovina) Darko Maletić
- (Bosnia and Herzegovina) Nenad Mišković
- (Bosnia and Herzegovina) Nihad Mujakić
- (Bosnia and Herzegovina) Siniša Saničanin
- (Bosnia and Herzegovina) Goran Zakarić
- (Brazil) Cléo
- (Brazil) Juca
- (Brazil) Leonardo
- (Brazil) Everton Luiz
- (Brazil) Matheus Saldanha
- (Bulgaria) Ivan Bandalovski
- (Bulgaria) Valeri Bojinov
- (Bulgaria) Ivan Ivanov
- (Bulgaria) Predrag Pažin
- (China) Jia Xiuquan
- (China) Liu Haiguang
- (Cameroon) Pierre Boya
- (Cameroon) Aboubakar Oumarou
- (Cameroon) Léandre Tawamba
- (Cape Verde) Ricardo Gomes
- (Curaçao) Xander Severina
- (Democratic Republic of the Congo) Aldo Kalulu
- (Ghana) Prince Tagoe
- (Ghana) Leonard Owusu
- (Ghana) Ibrahim Zubairu
- (Guinea) Seydouba Soumah
- (Guinea-Bissau) Almami Moreira
- (Honduras) Kervin Arriaga
- (Hungary) Filip Holender
- (Israel) Bibras Natcho
- (Japan) Takuma Asano
- (South Korea) Kim Chi-woo
- (South Korea) Goh Young-jun
- (Libya) Mohamed Zubya
- (Mali) Fousseni Diabaté
- (Montenegro) Mladen Božović
- (Montenegro) Andrija Delibašić
- (Montenegro) Nikola Drinčić
- (Montenegro) Uroš Đurđević
- (Montenegro) Petar Grbić
- (Montenegro) Marko Janković
- (Montenegro) Stevan Jovetić
- (Montenegro) Nebojša Kosović
- (Montenegro) Milorad Peković
- (Montenegro) Srđan Radonjić
- (Montenegro) Stefan Savić
- (Montenegro) Aleksandar Šćekić
- (Montenegro) Igor Vujačić
- (Montenegro) Milan Roganović
- (Montenegro) Milan Vukotić
- (Montenegro) Andrej Kostić
- (Montenegro) Stefan Milić
- (Netherlands) Queensy Menig
- (Nigeria) Ifeanyi Emeghara
- (Nigeria) Obiora Odita
- (Nigeria) Umar Sadiq
- (Nigeria) Taribo West
- (North Macedonia) Marjan Gerasimovski
- (North Macedonia) Georgi Hristov
- (North Macedonia) Aleksandar Lazevski
- (North Macedonia) Milan Stojanoski
- (North Macedonia) Viktor Trenevski
- (Norway) Ghayas Zahid
- (Poland) Tomasz Rząsa
- (Senegal) Lamine Diarra
- (Senegal) Demba Seck
- (Sierra Leone) Medo Kamara
- (Slovenia) Gregor Balažic
- (Slovenia) Branko Ilić
- (Slovenia) Zlatko Zahovič
- (Slovenia) Mario Jurčević
- (Spain) Marc Valiente
- (United States) Ilija Mitić

For a list of all FK Partizan players with a Wikipedia article, see Category:FK Partizan players.

== Club management ==
As of 30 June 2026

Position	Staff
President	(Serbia) Rasim Ljajić
General director	(Serbia) Danko Lazović
Sporting director	(Serbia) Radosav Petrović
Vice president for business affairs	(Serbia) Milka Forcan
Board member	(Serbia) Vojislav Lazarević

=== Managerial history ===
Below is a list of Partizan managers from 1945 until the present day.

Name	Years
Franjo Glaser	1945–46
Illés Spitz	1946–51
Antun Pogačnik	1952–53
Illés Spitz	1953
Milovan Ćirić	1953–54
Illés Spitz	1954–55
Aleksandar Tomašević	1955–56
Kiril Simonovski	1956–57
Florijan Matekalo	1957
Géza Kalocsay	1957–58
Illés Spitz	1958–60
Stjepan Bobek	1960–63
Kiril Simonovski	1963
Marko Valok	1963–64
Florijan Matekalo	1964
Aleksandar Atanacković	1964
Marko Valok	1965
Abdulah Gegić	1965–66
Kiril Simonovski	1966
Stevan Vilotić	1966–67
Stjepan Bobek	1967–69
Stevan Vilotić	1969
Kiril Simonovski	1969–70
Gojko Zec	1970–71
Velibor Vasović	1971–73
Mirko Damjanović	1973–74
Tomislav Kaloperović	1974–76
Jovan Miladinović	1976
Ante Mladinić	1977–78
Florijan Matekalo / Jovan Miladinović	1979
Josip Duvančić	1979–80
Tomislav Kaloperović	1980–82
Miloš Milutinović	1982–84
Nenad Bjeković	1984–87
Fahrudin Jusufi	1987–88
Momčilo Vukotić	1988–89
Ivan Golac	1989–90
Nenad Bjeković	1990
Miloš Milutinović	1990–91
Ivica Osim	1991–92
Ljubiša Tumbaković	1992–99
Miodrag Ješić	1999–00
Ljubiša Tumbaković	2000–02
Lothar Matthäus	2002–03
Vladimir Vermezović	2004–05
Jürgen Röber	2005–06
Miodrag Ješić	2006–07
Miroslav Đukić	2007
Slaviša Jokanović	2007–09
Goran Stevanović	2009–10
Aleksandar Stanojević	2010–12
Avram Grant	2012
Vladimir Vermezović	2012–13
Vuk Rašović	2013
Marko Nikolić	2013–15
Zoran Milinković	2015
Ljubinko Drulović	2015–16
Ivan Tomić	2016
Marko Nikolić	2016–17
Miroslav Đukić	2017–18
Zoran Mirković	2018–19
Savo Milošević	2019–20
Aleksandar Stanojević	2020–22
Ilija Stolica	2022
Gordan Petrić	2022–23
Igor Duljaj	2023–24
Albert Nađ	2024
Aleksandar Stanojević	2024
Savo Milošević	2024
Srđan Blagojević	2025
Nenad Stojaković	2025–26
Damir Čakar	2026
Srđan Blagojević	2026
Saša Ilić	2026–

=== Club presidents ===
The full list of Partizan's presidents is given below.

Name	Years
Ratko Vujović	1950
Bogdan Vujošević	1952–56
Đuro Lončarević	1956–58
Martin Dasović	1958–62
Dimitrije Pisković	1962–63
Ilija Radaković	1963–65
Vladimir Dujić	1965–67
Mića Lovrić	1967–71
Milosav Prelić	1971–73
Vesa Živković	1973–74
Predrag Gligorić	1974–75
Nikola Lekić	1975–79

Name	Years
Vlada Kostić	1979–81
Miloš Ostojić	1981–83
Dragan Papović	1983–87
Zdravko Lončar	1987–88
Ivan Ćurković	1989–06
Nenad Popović	2006–07
Tomislav Karadžić	2007–08
Dragan Đurić	2008–14
Zoran Popović	2014–15
Ivan Ćurković	2015–16
Milorad Vučelić	2016–24
Rasim Ljajić	2024–

== Ownership and finances ==
Partizan operates as a sports association, as part of Partizan Sports Association, which includes 28 clubs in different sports, but it has complete independence regarding organisation, management, finances, material goods and facilities. In 2010, the club's non-consolidated operating revenues amounted to €21.2 million and EBITDA amounted to €3.5 million.

=== Shirt sponsors and manufacturers ===
Period	Kit Manufacturer	Shirt Sponsor
1978–82	Sport	None
1982	Adidas	Fiat
1983–85	Adidas	Rubin
1986–87	Adidas	Iskra Delta
1988	Adidas	Lee Cooper
1989–90	Adidas	Beko
1990–92	Vocado	Aiwa
1992–93	Admiral	None
1993–94	Admiral	GOMA
1994–96	ASICS	GOMA
1996–98	Nike	OKI
1998–00	Nike	Peugeot
2000	NAAI	Peugeot
2000–03	Puma	Peugeot

Period	Kit Manufacturer	Shirt Sponsor
2003–04	Kappa	Superfund
2004–06	Kappa	Imlek
2006	Kappa	Austrotherm
2006–09	Kappa	Volkswagen
2009–10	Kappa	MSI
2010–11	Adidas	EPS^{(*)}
2011–12	Adidas	None
2012–15	Adidas	Lav pivo
2015–16	Adidas	mts
2016–23	Nike	mts
2023–24	Puma	mts
2024–	Puma	MaxBet

_{*Only European and Domestic Cup matches}
