= Ratko Vujović =

Yugoslavian politician (1916–1977)

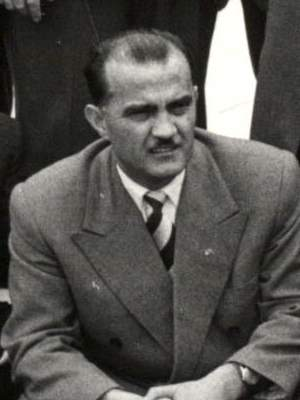
Vujović in 1958

Ratko Vujović (16 December 1916 – 29 October 1977) was a Yugoslavian political activist and soldier. After the Second World War, Vujović was the first elected President of FK Partizan.

== Biography ==
Ratko Vujović was born on 16 December 1916 in Nikšić, Montenegro. Before the start of the Second World War, he was a student. As a member of the Communist Party of Yugoslavia, he was active since 1938. He also took part in the Spanish Civil War.

He came back to Yugoslavia around July 1941 and fought in the Yugoslav People's Liberation War. He became a deputy, as well as political commissar of the 2nd Krajina (Kozarian) detachment. He was a prominent combatant in a heavy battle in the time of great offensives at Kozara in the summer of 1942. After that, he became the deputy commander of the 5th Krajina (Kozarian) brigade and then, he became an officer in the 1st Bosnian Corps. He was voted for National Hero on 27 November 1953.
