= Nemanja Jovšić =

Serbian footballer

Personal information
- Full name: Nemanja Jovšić
- Date of birth: 7 October 1983 (age 43)
- Place of birth: Zemun, SFR Yugoslavia
- Height: 1.99 m (6 ft 6 in)
- Position: Goalkeeper

Youth career
- Partizan

Senior career*
Years	Team	Apps	(Gls)
2001–2007	Partizan	5	(0)
2001–2006	→ Teleoptik (loan)	52	(0)
2005	→ Jedinstvo Bijelo Polje (loan)	17	(0)
2006	→ Smederevo (loan)	1	(0)
2007–2008	Zemun	30	(0)
2008–2009	Banat Zrenjanin	6	(0)
2010	Hajduk Kula	5	(0)
2011	Inđija	8	(0)
Total		124	(0)

International career
2001	FR Yugoslavia U19 (Note: Only official UEFA matches included)	4	(0)
2003	Serbia and Montenegro U21	2	(0)
- * Club domestic league appearances and goals

Nemanja Jovšić (Serbian Cyrillic: Немања Јовшић; born 7 October 1983) is a Serbian former professional footballer who played as a goalkeeper.

== Club career ==
In June 2001, Jovšić signed his first professional contract with Partizan. He spent the next few years on loan at their affiliated club Teleoptik. In the 2004–05 season, Jovšić was promoted to the first team and made one league appearance in the process, as the club won the championship title. He then went on a six-month loan to Jedinstvo Bijelo Polje, before returning to Partizan in January 2006. Until the end of the 2005–06 season, Jovšić appeared in two league games for the Black-Whites. He was subsequently sent on loan to Smederevo, before returning to Partizan and making two league appearances in the second part of the 2006–07 season.

== International career ==
Jovšić represented FR Yugoslavia at the 2001 UEFA European Under-18 Championship, serving as a backup for Vukašin Poleksić.

== Honours ==
=== Club ===
Partizan

- First League of Serbia and Montenegro: 2004–05

Zemun

- Serbian Cup: Runner-up 2007–08

=== Individual ===
- Serbian Cup Best Player: 2007–08
