= Đuro Jandrić =

Serbian footballer

Personal information
- Full name: Đuro Jandrić
- Date of birth: 30 October 1983 (age 43)
- Place of birth: Belgrade, SFR Yugoslavia
- Height: 1.93 m (6 ft 4 in)
- Position: Centre-back

Senior career*
Years	Team	Apps	(Gls)
2001–2007	IMT		
2008	Zemun	16	(1)
2009	Pelister		
2009–2010	Javor Ivanjica	1	(0)
2009–2010	→ Grafičar Beograd (loan)	13	(2)
2010	→ Srem (loan)	6	(0)
2011	Elbasani	10	(0)
2011–2012	Voždovac	26	(1)
2012–2013	IMT		
2013	Vyzas	12	(0)
2014–2015	Budućnost Dobanovci		
2015–2017	Brodarac		
- * Club domestic league appearances and goals as of 29 October 2014

Đuro Jandrić (Serbian Cyrillic: Ђуро Јандрић; born 30 October 1983) is a Serbian retired football defender.
