= Bogdan Vujošević =

World War II veteran

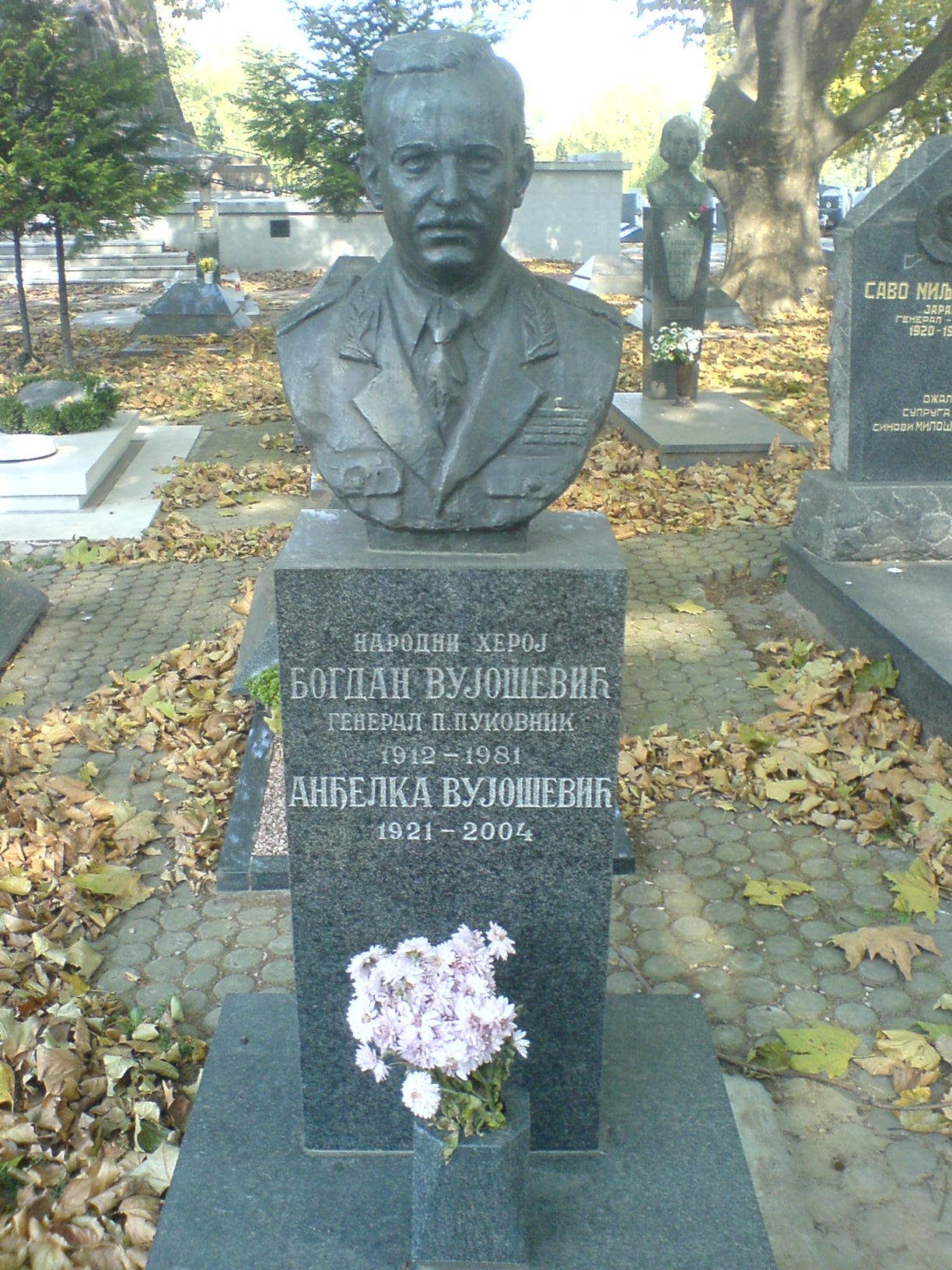
Grave of Vujosevic

Bogdan Vujošević (26 January 1912, in village Doljani, near Podgorica – 10 July 1981, in Belgrade), was a WWII veteran, Lieutenant General of the Yugoslav People's Army and recipient of the Order of the People's Hero of Yugoslavia.

== Biography ==
Vujošević was born on 26 January 1912 in village of Doljani near Podgorica, Montenegro. After completing primary and secondary education in Podgorica, Vujošević moved to Belgrade and enrolled the studies of mathematics at the Faculty of Philosophy. During the studies, he participated in numerous demonstrations and student strikes, and joined the Communist Party of Yugoslavia in June 1936. Upon graduation Vujošević worked as a private maths tutor.

After the April war and collapse of Kingdom of Yugoslavia, Vujošević returned to Montenegro and joined the preparations for the armed rebellion against the fascists.

Vujošević was a participant of the July 13 uprising in Montenegro and very first partisan combats with the Italians. Throughout WW2 Vujošević participated in major battles against the Axis and their collaborators, and was wounded three times.

After the liberation of Yugoslavia, Vujošević held various senior posts in Belgrade.

He was among the founding fathers of Partizan Belgrade.

Bogdan Vujošević was decorated with the Order of the People's Hero of Yugoslavia on 27 November 1953.

He retired from active military service in 1970.

Vujošević died on 10 July 1981 in Belgrade.
