= FK Zemun =

Association football club in Zemun, Serbia

Zemun
- Full name: Fudbalski klub Zemun
- Founded: 1946; 80 years ago
- Ground: Stadium Dragan Džajić, Ub
- Capacity: 4,000
- President: Gavrilo Kovačević
- Head coach: Dejan Medić (caretaker)
- League: Serbian SuperLiga
- 2025–26: Serbian First League, 1st of 16
Home colours	Away colours

Fudbalski klub Zemun (Serbian Cyrillic: Фудбалски клуб Земун) is a Serbian professional football club based in Zemun, Belgrade, that competes in the Serbian SuperLiga.

== History ==
Immediately after the end of the Second World War, the sports activities in Zemun were restored. By early 1945, a club FK Maksim Divnić was formed, named in honour of a player with that name that played before the war and who died as Partisan fighter during the war. After just a couple of played matches the club changed its name into FK Sremac Zemun. By the end of that year another club is also formed in Zemun, FK Sparta Zemun. On 20 October 1946, the two clubs were merged to form a new sports society whose football section was FK Jedinstvo Zemun.

By 1962, the club were promoted into the group East of the Yugoslav Second League, which was divided back then into two geographical groups, East and West. It stayed at Second national level for two seasons, after which it returned into the Serbian republic league, Yugoslav third tier. In the late 1960s, the club struggled financially, and on February 23, 1969, it is merged with FK Galenika, a club sponsored by the Galenika a.d., a pharmaceutical company located in Zemun. Under the new name FK Galenika Zemun, and with new financial backing, the club soon returned to the higher leagues, winning promotion as soon as 1970 to the Yugoslav Second League.

Coached by Ivan Čabrinović, the club became one of the strongest teams in the second league, and after several times being close, it finally reached promotion to the Yugoslav First League in 1982. In that same season, the club reached the semi-finals of the 1981–82 Yugoslav Cup where they lost against the cup winners Red Star Belgrade. The club played in the 1982–83 Yugoslav First League however it finished bottom of the table subsequently relegated back to the Second League. On 1 January 1985, the club changed its name into the one that still carries nowadays, FK Zemun.

During the late 1980s, the club had fallen into the lower leagues, but after the stabilization of their financial situation the club began rising again. In 1990, after two consecutive promotions, the club was back in the 1990–91 Yugoslav First League. This time the club stabilized in the top league and even managed to achieve good results, like fourth place in the 1992–93 First League of FR Yugoslavia, just behind the best Serbian clubs Partizan, Red Star and Vojvodina, or the 5th place archive in the 1993–94 First League of FR Yugoslavia. In the 1992–93 season the club had reached again the semi-finals of the Yugoslav Cup.

FK Zemun competed in the top league all the way until 2007. In the season 2004–05 they managed to achieve 5th place once more.

In 2007, Zemun competed in the Serbian First League and came away with the 15th position and an automatic relegation to the Serbian League Belgrade, third tier. FK Zemun played in the 2007–08 Serbian Cup and found its way to the final. The club won three matches after penalties, defeated two first league sides and goalie Nemanja Jovšić was voted most valuable player. They lost the final 3–0 to Serbian team Partizan but since Partizan had already qualified for the Champions League Zemun were given the UEFA Cup spot as they were the runners-up. During the summer, however, Zemun was not able to obtain a license from UEFA and had to give their spot to fourth-placed side Borac Čačak. Borac then gave their Intertoto Cup spot to OFK Beograd.

In 2008–09, Zemun became the champion of Serbian League Belgrade and were back to the Serbian First League after only one season.

In 2015–16, Zemun was promoted again to the Serbian First League. The following year after a bad start, they fired Dragoljub Bekvalac and hired Milan Milanović.

In November 2017, a news website Srbijadanas.rs, published a research in which they found that FK Zemun is the club that transferred more players, 35 at that time, than any other club to the Serbian "Big two" eternal rivals, Partizan and Red Star Belgrade.

== Honours ==
- Yugoslav Second League
  - Champions (2): 1981–82 (East), 1988–89
- Serbian Cup
  - Runners-up (1): 2007–08
- Serbian First League
  - Winners (1): 2025–26
- Serbian League Belgrade
  - Winners (3): 2008-09, 2014–15, 2023-24
- Serbian Republic League
  - Winners (3): 1977–78, 1986–87, 1987–88
- Belgrade Cup
  - Winners (2): 2014-15, 2023-24

=== Stadium ===
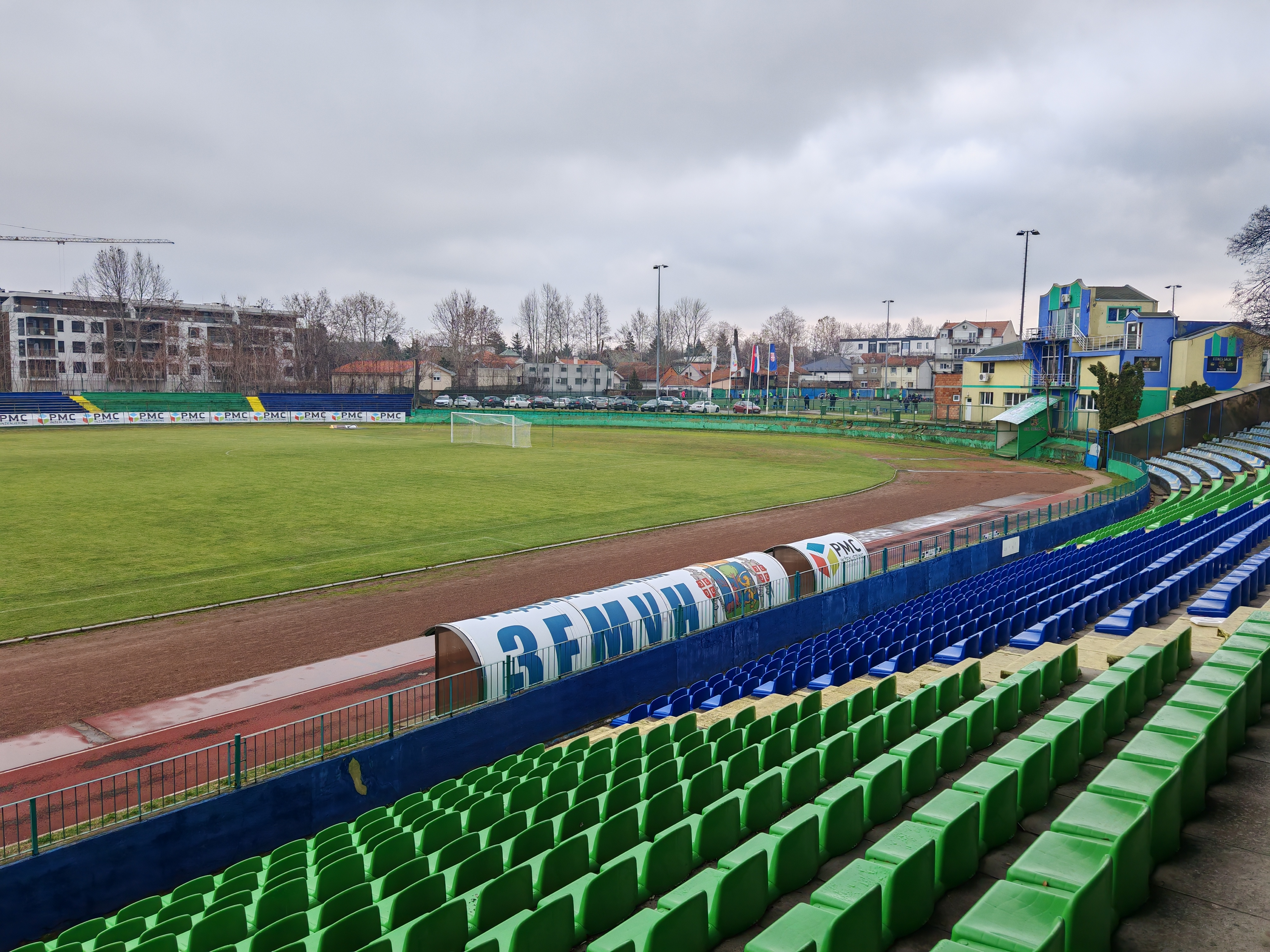

The home stadium of FK Zemun is the Zemun Stadium, opened in 1962, and can host up to 9,600 spectators.

== Players ==
=== Current squad ===
As of 5 October 2026

Note: Flags indicate national team as defined under FIFA eligibility rules; some limited exceptions apply. Players may hold more than one non-FIFA nationality.

No.	Pos.	Nation	Player
1	GK	SRB	Marko Knežević
4	DF	SRB	Ilija Kostić
5	DF	SRB	Đorđe Jovanović
6	MF	SRB	Žarko Bogdanović
7	FW	SRB	Dimitrije Tabaković
8	MF	SRB	Ognjen Ilić
9	FW	SRB	Novak Petrušić
10	FW	SRB	Nemanja Belaković
11	FW	SRB	Saša Knežević
12	FW	USA	Eduvie Ikoba
14	FW	AUT	Nikola Dovedan
15	DF	MKD	Oliver Stoimenovski
16	DF	SRB	Milan Spremo
19	MF	GHA	Godswill Vadze
20	MF	SRB	Đorđe Petrović

No.	Pos.	Nation	Player
21	DF	SRB	Ivan Ostojić
23	MF	SRB	Milan Jokić
25	DF	SRB	Dejan Parađina
27	FW	SRB	Uroš Ljubomirac
29	FW	SRB	Andrej Milošević
31	FW	SRB	Nemanja Kalat
32	MF	UKR	Mykhailo Meskhi
45	FW	SRB	Marko Šarić
53	GK	SRB	Leon Borković
66	DF	SRB	Vasilije Bakić
75	FW	SRB	Ilija Pešić
77	MF	SRB	Leon Iliev
88	DF	SRB	Aleksandar Kadijević
89	GK	SRB	Mladen Živković (captain)
99	GK	MNE	Mišo Dubljanić

=== Out on loan ===
Note: Flags indicate national team as defined under FIFA eligibility rules; some limited exceptions apply. Players may hold more than one non-FIFA nationality.

No.	Pos.	Nation	Player
—	DF	SRB	Strahinja Belaćević (at FAP until the end of the 2026–27 season)

=== Coaching staff ===
Position	Name
Head coach	(Serbia) Dejan Medić (caretaker)
Assistant coach	(Serbia) Igor Kurtović (Serbia) Dejan Grujić
Analyst coach	(Serbia) Vladimir Simić
Fitness coach	(Serbia) Vladimir Pročikević
Goalkeeping coach	(Serbia) Milenko Bjelić (Serbia) Bojan Isailović
Physiotherapist	(Serbia) Dušan Jandrić (Serbia) Vladimir Milošević (Serbia) Ognjen Vidović
Doctor	(Serbia) Milan Gnjidić
Economic	(Serbia) Siniša Pavković
Security commissioner	(Serbia) Obrad Brašanac
General secretary	(Serbia) Nenad Kiso

=== Notable players ===
The following list contains players that played in the club and that have national team appearances:

(Socialist Federal Republic of Yugoslavia) Yugoslavia / Serbia and Montenegro / Serbia

- Nikola Beljić
- Igor Bogdanović
- Miloš Bursać
- Ratomir Dujković
- Nenad Džodić
- Brana Ilić
- Damir Kahriman
- Nenad Kovačević
- Aleksandar Kristić
- Nenad Lalatović
- Dejan Lekić
- Dragan Mance
- Vladimir Martinović
- Mirko Mihić
- Nenad Milijaš
- Dragan Mladenović
- Pavle Ninkov
- Aleksandar Pantić
- Radovan Radaković
- Predrag Ristović
- Slobodan Santrač
- Miroslav Savić
- Borislav Stevanović
- Vladimir Stojković
- Bojan Šaranov
- Miloš Šestić
- Nemanja Tomić
- Branislav Trajković

Other

- (Bosnia and Herzegovina) Admir Aganović
- (Bosnia and Herzegovina) Nemanja Supić
- (Georgia (country)) Davit Volkovi
- (Guinea) Ibrahima Sory Camara
- (Lithuania) Justas Lasickas
- (Lithuania) Daniel Romanovskij
- (Malta) Andrei Agius
- (Namibia) Hendrik Somaeb
- (North Macedonia) Dušan Savić
- (Sierra Leone) Mustapha Bangura
- (Slovakia) Boris Sekulić

For the list of all current and former players with wikipedia article, please see Category:FK Zemun players.

== Supporters ==
The supporters of the club are known as the Taurunum Boys. The group was formed in 1987.

The first organised supporting groups of back then FK Galenika begin to appear by mid-1980s. In 1986 the first ultras groups were formed under the names of Testas Caldas, Pajtosi and Godfathers. In 1987 the three groups united under the name Taurunum. The name comes from the Latin name of a settlement that existed in Roman period in the place where Zemun is located nowadays, and that was named Taurunum. The group stands in the north stand of the stadium. Some supporting groups out of the town of Zemun are formed, the most important being the Rangers from Pančevo. In 1995 by the end of the Yugoslav Wars there is a generational turn-over, and the group standing in the east stand formed by younger supporters and named The Boys – Dragons, joins Taurunum in the north stand forming a bigger group renamed Taurunum Boys. The moto of the group becomes "One city, one club, only Zemun".

Nowadays the group is composed of several sub-groups, and beside supporting their club FK Zemun, they are usually present at the matches of the Serbia national team. They have friendly relationships with the fan group of Radnički Kragujevac, Crveni Đavoli. and Young Rats Firm of Krylia Sovetov Samara.
