= 1986–87 FK Partizan season =

Partizan
1986–87 season
- President: Dragan Papović
- Head coach: Nenad Bjeković
- Yugoslav First League: Winners
- Yugoslav Cup: First round
- UEFA Cup: First round
- Top goalscorer: League: All: Milko Đurovski

The 1986–87 season was the 41st season in FK Partizan's existence. This article shows player statistics and matches that the club played during the 1986–87 season.

== Friendlies ==
8 February 1987 Mostar tournament	Partizan (Socialist Federal Republic of Yugoslavia)	1–1 (4-3)	(Socialist Federal Republic of Yugoslavia) Hajduk Split	Mostar
	Djurovski			Stadium: Rodjeni

9 February 1987 Mostar tournament	Partizan (Socialist Federal Republic of Yugoslavia)	1–1 (5-4)	(Socialist Federal Republic of Yugoslavia) Velez Mostar	Mostar
	Djurovski			Stadium: Rodjeni

== Season overview ==
The 1986–87 Yugoslav First League title was awarded to FK Partizan, as the 6 points deduction that originally made Vardar Skopje champions, was declared invalid.

== Players ==
=== Squad information ===
players (league matches/league goals):

- Fahrudin Omerović (34/0) (goalkeeper)
- Milko Đurovski (31/19)
- Goran Stevanović (31/4)
- Admir Smajić (31/3)
- Srečko Katanec (30/3)
- Vladimir Vermezović (29/1)
- Nebojša Vučićević (28/7)
- Fadil Vokrri (28/5)
- Miodrag Bajović (27/2)
- Miloš Đelmaš (26/7)
- Bajro Župić (26/0)
- Vlado Čapljić (24/1)
- Isa Sadriu (18/0)
- Goran Bogdanović (17/1)
- Aleksandar Đorđević (16/2)
- Milinko Pantić (15/3)
- Slađan Šćepović (6/0)
- Ljubomir Radanović (5/0)
- Darko Milanič (4/0)
- Miodrag Radović (4/0)
- Darko Belojević

== Competitions ==
=== Yugoslav First League ===
Pos	Team	Pld	W	D	L	GF	GA	GD	Pts	Qualification or relegation
1	Partizan (C)	34	16	11	7	58	29	+29	43	Qualification for UEFA Cup first round
2	Velež	34	19	4	11	65	46	+19	42	Qualification for UEFA Cup first round
3	Red Star Belgrade	34	16	9	9	57	37	+20	41	Qualification for UEFA Cup first round
4	Rijeka	34	14	10	10	44	42	+2	38	
5	Vardar	34	15	8	11	40	39	+1	38	Qualification for European Cup first round

Source: rsssf.org
Rules for classification: 1) points; 2) goal difference; 3) number of goals scored.
(C) Champions

==== Matches ====
10 August 1986 1	Partizan	2–0	Spartak Subotica	Belgrade
	Đurovski 24'; Đelmaš 66' (pen.)			Stadium: JNA Stadium

17 August 1986 2	Partizan	1–1	Budućnost	Belgrade
	Đurovski 33'		Savićević 54'	Stadium: JNA Stadium

23 August 1986 3	Sloboda Tuzla	1–3	Partizan	Tuzla
	Hrkić 80'		Đelmaš 1'; Vokrri 48', 73'

31 August 1986 4	Partizan	2–1	Čelik	Belgrade
	Smajić 43'; Bogdanović 86'		Đurđević 50'	Stadium: JNA Stadium; Attendance: 25,000

7 September 1986 5	Rijeka	0–3	Partizan	Rijeka
			Đelmaš 16'; Vokrri 75'; Čapljić 79' (pen.)	Attendance: 16,000

13 September 1986 6	Partizan	1–2	Dinamo Zagreb	Belgrade
	Vučićević 85'		Bogdanović 20', 54'	Stadium: JNA Stadium; Attendance: 35,000

21 September 1986 7	Željezničar	3–1	Partizan	Sarajevo
	Mihajlović 54' 79' (pen.) 88'		Vučićević 28'

28 September 1986 8	Partizan	2–0	Osijek	Belgrade
	Đelmaš 61'; Pantić 83'			Stadium: JNA Stadium

5 October 1986 9	Priština	0–0	Partizan	Priština

12 October 1986 10	Partizan	2–0	Crvena zvezda	Belgrade
	Smajić 61'; Đurovski 66'			Stadium: JNA Stadium; Attendance: 50,000

18 October 1986 11	Sutjeska Nikšić	0–0	Partizan	Nikšić

2 November 1986 12	Partizan	2–2	Vardar	Belgrade
	Katanec 57'; Đurovski 73'		Petrov 12'; Pančev 21'	Stadium: JNA Stadium

16 November 1986 13	Radnički Niš	0–1	Partizan	Niš
			Đurovski 56'

22 November 1986 14	Partizan	4–1	Hajduk Split	Belgrade
	Đurovski 10' 85' (pen.); Đelmaš 47'; Vučićević 87'		Deverić 52'	Stadium: JNA Stadium

30 November 1986 15	Velež	1–1	Partizan	Mostar
	Gudelj 25'		Vučićević 70'

7 December 1986 16	Partizan	1–0	Sarajevo	Belgrade
	Katanec 17'			Stadium: JNA Stadium; Attendance: 15,000

14 December 1986 17	Dinamo Vinkovci	0–3	Partizan	Vinkovci
			Đurovski 51', 70'; Stevanović 81'

22 February 1987 18	Spartak Subotica	1–1	Partizan	Subotica

1 March 1987 19	Budućnost	1–1	Partizan	Titograd
	Savićević 29'		Vokrri 59'

3 March 1987 20	Partizan	3–0	Sloboda Tuzla	Belgrade
	Đurovski 2' (pen.) 44', 54'			Stadium: JNA Stadium

15 March 1987 21	Čelik	1–1	Partizan	Zenica
	Hadžialagić 35' (pen.)		Bajović 68'	Stadium: Bilino Polje; Attendance: 20,000; Referee: Vujović

22 March 1987 22	Partizan	1–1	Rijeka	Belgrade
	Đorđević 17' (pen.)		Janković 73'	Stadium: JNA Stadium; Attendance: 20,000

29 March 1987 23	Dinamo Zagreb	2–1	Partizan	Zagreb
	Mlinarić 5'; Arslanović 53'		Katanec 30'	Stadium: Stadion Maksimir; Attendance: 40,000

5 April 1987 24	Partizan	0–1	Željezničar	Belgrade
			Mihajlović 25'	Stadium: JNA Stadium; Attendance: 25,000

12 April 1987 25	Osijek	2–0	Partizan	Osijek
	Karačić 13' 28' (pen.)

15 April 1987 26	Partizan	5–1	Priština	Belgrade
	Stevanović 24'; Pantić 29'; Đelmaš 38'; Smajić 75'; Vučićević 81'		Đukić 55'	Stadium: JNA Stadium; Attendance: 6,000; Referee: Čović

19 April 1987 27	Crvena zvezda	3–1	Partizan	Belgrade
	Musemić 9'; Cvetković 14', 19'		Đurovski 90'	Stadium: Marakana; Attendance: 50,000; Referee: Dušan Čolić

3 May 1987 28	Partizan	2–0	Sutjeska Nikšić	Belgrade
	Đorđević 70' (pen.); Pantić 74'			Stadium: JNA Stadium; Attendance: 10,000

10 May 1987 29	Vardar	0–0	Partizan	Skopje
				Stadium: Philip II Arena; Attendance: 30,000

17 May 1987 30	Partizan	3–1	Radnički Niš	Belgrade
	Đurovski 18' (pen.) 35'; Vokrri 71'		Punišić 62'	Stadium: JNA Stadium; Attendance: 15,000

24 May 1987 31	Hajduk Split	2–1	Partizan	Split
	Setinov 46'; Vulić 48'		Vučićević 90'	Stadium: Stadion Poljud; Attendance: 20,000

31 May 1987 32	Partizan	3–0	Velež	Belgrade
	Đurovski 36' 61' (pen.); Vučićević 84'			Stadium: JNA Stadium

7 June 1987 33	Sarajevo	1–1	Partizan	Sarajevo
	Merdanović 62'		Đurovski 33' (pen.)

14 June 1987 34	Partizan	5–0	Dinamo Vinkovci	Belgrade
	Stevanović 11', 42'; Bajović 44'; Đelmaš 69'; Đurovski 73'			Stadium: JNA Stadium; Attendance: 20,000

=== Yugoslav Cup ===
13 August 1986 Round of 32	Radnički Kragujevac	3–2	Partizan	Kragujevac
			Vučićević 58'; Đelmaš 67'

=== UEFA Cup ===
==== First round ====
16 September 1986 First round 1st leg	Borussia Mönchengladbach (West Germany)	1–0	(Socialist Federal Republic of Yugoslavia) Partizan	Mönchengladbach, West Germany
20:15	Krauss 25'	Report		Stadium: Bökelbergstadion; Attendance: 6,000; Referee: Lajos Németh (Hungary)

1 October 1986 First round 2nd leg	Partizan (Socialist Federal Republic of Yugoslavia)	1–3 (1 – 4 agg.)	(West Germany) Borussia Mönchengladbach	Belgrade, Yugoslavia
16:00	Vučićević 47'	Report	Dressen 27'; Brandts 82'; Lienen 85'	Stadium: JNA Stadium; Attendance: 50,000; Referee: Robert Wurtz (France)

== See also ==
- List of FK Partizan seasons
