= 1987–88 FK Partizan season =

Partizan
1987–88 season
- President: Zdravko Lončar
- Head coach: Fahrudin Jusufi
- Yugoslav First League: Runners-up
- Yugoslav Cup: First round
- UEFA Cup: First round
- Top goalscorer: League: All: Milko Đurovski

The 1987–88 season was the 42nd season in FK Partizan's existence. This article shows player statistics and matches that the club played during the 1987–88 season.

== Friendlies ==
8 February 1988 Mostar tournament	Partizan (Socialist Federal Republic of Yugoslavia)	3–1	(Hungary) FK Vašaš	Mostar
	Katanec Radanović Djurovski

9 February 1988 Mostar tournament	Velez Mostar (Socialist Federal Republic of Yugoslavia)	2–1	(Socialist Federal Republic of Yugoslavia) FK Partizan	Mostar
			Scepovic

== Competitions ==
=== Yugoslav First League ===
Pos	Team	Pld	W	D	L	GF	GA	GD	Pts	Qualification or relegation
1	Red Star Belgrade (C)	34	17	11	6	66	39	+27	45	Qualification for European Cup first round
2	Partizan	34	17	10	7	62	37	+25	44	Qualification for UEFA Cup first round
3	Velež	34	15	12	7	61	34	+27	42	Qualification for UEFA Cup first round
4	Dinamo Zagreb	34	16	10	8	55	36	+19	42	Qualification for UEFA Cup first round
5	Sloboda Tuzla	34	14	10	10	53	41	+12	38	

Source: rsssf.org
Rules for classification: 1) points; 2) goal difference; 3) number of goals scored.
(C) Champions

2 August 1987 1	Partizan	1–0	Vojvodina	Belgrade
	Bajović 68'			Stadium: JNA Stadium

9 August 1987 2	Velež	1–1	Partizan	Mostar
	Jurić 36'		Vokrri 21'

16 August 1987 3	Partizan	0–1	Čelik	Belgrade
			Fileš 14'	Stadium: JNA Stadium; Attendance: 15,000

23 August 1987 4	Vardar	2–1	Partizan	Skopje
	Pančev 40', 60'		Vokrri 80'

6 September 1987 5	Partizan	2–3	Crvena zvezda	Belgrade
	Stevanović 26'; Vučićević 57'		Stojković 14'; Cvetković 54', 56'	Stadium: JNA Stadium; Attendance: 55,000; Referee: Antun Šumić

12 September 1987 6	Rad	3–3	Partizan	Belgrade
	Ajder 5', 54'; Milinković		Vokrri 31', 55'; Djurovski 41' (pen.)

21 September 1987 7	Partizan	6–1	Osijek	Belgrade
	Vučićević 4'; Stevanović 18'; Šćepović 26'; Bajović 28', 58'; Radanović 49'		Rakela 62'	Stadium: JNA Stadium; Attendance: 15,000

27 September 1987 8	Sutjeska Nikšić	1–1	Partizan	Nikšić
	Drizić 8'		Bajović 15'

4 October 1987 9	Partizan	3–0	Hajduk Split	Belgrade
	Stevanović 11' (pen.); Vokrri 78'; Šćepović 80'			Stadium: JNA Stadium

7 October 1987 10	Priština	0–0	Partizan	Priština

18 October 1987 11	Partizan	1–0	Radnički Niš	Belgrade
	Djurovski			Stadium: JNA Stadium

25 October 1987 12	Dinamo Zagreb	1–2	Partizan	Zagreb
	Bogdanović 12'		Šćepović 3'; Vokrri 24'	Stadium: Stadion Maksimir; Attendance: 27,632

1 November 1987 13	Partizan	0–0	Željezničar	Belgrade
				Stadium: JNA Stadium

15 November 1987 14	Partizan	1–1	Rijeka	Belgrade
				Stadium: JNA Stadium

22 November 1987 15	Sloboda Tuzla	3–1	Partizan	Tuzla
	Lukić 18'; Mihić 30'; Kostić 71'		Djurovski 70'	Stadium: Stadion Tušanj; Attendance: 7,000

29 November 1987 16	Partizan	1–0	Sarajevo	Belgrade
	Djurovski 85'			Stadium: JNA Stadium

6 December 1987 17	Budućnost Titograd	0–3	Partizan	Titograd

6 March 1988 18	Vojvodina	1–0	Partizan	Novi Sad

13 March 1988 19	Partizan	1–0	Velež	Belgrade
	Djurovski			Stadium: JNA Stadium

20 March 1988 20	Čelik	0–0	Partizan	Zenica

27 March 1988 21	Partizan	2–1	Vardar	Belgrade
	Batrović (?)		Simoski 30'	Stadium: JNA Stadium

3 April 1988 22	Crvena zvezda	1–1	Partizan	Belgrade
	Binić 2'		Đukić 70'	Stadium: Marakana; Attendance: 90,000

10 April 1988 23	Partizan	5–1	Rad	Belgrade
	Djurovski 7' (pen.) (?) 74', 82'; Vučićević (?)		Vukadinović (?)	Stadium: JNA Stadium

17 April 1988 24	Osijek	4–1	Partizan	Osijek

20 April 1988 25	Partizan	1–0	Sutjeska Nikšić	Belgrade
				Stadium: JNA Stadium

24 April 1988 26	Hajduk Split	2–0	Partizan	Split

1 May 1988 27	Partizan	3–1	Priština	Belgrade
				Stadium: JNA Stadium

4 May 1988 28	Radnički Niš	1–4	Partizan	Niš
	Vasilijević 45' (pen.)		Katanec 22', 84'; Djurovski 36'; Đukić 63'

8 May 1988 29	Partizan	2–1	Dinamo Zagreb	Belgrade
	Vučićević 22'; Šćepović (?)		Boban (?)	Stadium: JNA Stadium

15 May 1988 30	Željezničar	3–3	Partizan	Sarajevo
	Bahtić 29'; Mihajlović 43'; Komšić 78'		Vučićević 35' (pen.); Batrović 67'; Radanović 75'

22 May 1988 31	Rijeka	0–3	Partizan	Rijeka
			Batrović (?); Šćepović (?); Đukić (?)

29 May 1988 32	Partizan	5–2	Sloboda Tuzla	Belgrade
	Đukić 3', 60', 72'; Batrović 38'; Vučićević 78'		Mihić 39'; Milošević 65'	Stadium: JNA Stadium

8 June 1988 33	Sarajevo	2–2	Partizan	Sarajevo
	Jakovljević 47'; Kuprešanin (?)		Liu Haiguang (?); Batrović 85'

12 June 1988 34	Partizan	2–0	Budućnost	Belgrade
				Stadium: JNA Stadium

=== Yugoslav Cup ===
12 August 1987 Round of 32	Iskra Bugojno	0–0 (4–3 p)	Partizan	Bugojno

=== UEFA Cup ===
==== First round ====
16 September 1987 First round 1st leg	Flamurtari Vlorë (Albania)	2–0	(Socialist Federal Republic of Yugoslavia) Partizan	Vlorë, Albania
16:30	Đorđević 30' (o.g.); Iljadhi 82'	Report		Stadium: Flamurtari Stadium; Attendance: 19,000; Referee: Georges Sandoz (Switzerland)

30 September 1987 First round 2nd leg	Partizan (Socialist Federal Republic of Yugoslavia)	2–1 (2 – 3 agg.)	(Albania) Flamurtari Vlorë	Belgrade, Yugoslavia
17:00	Stevanović 44' (pen.); Vokrri 60'	Report	Kushta 82'	Stadium: JNA Stadium; Attendance: 40,000; Referee: Andrzej Libich (Poland)

== See also ==
- List of FK Partizan seasons
