= 1989–90 FK Partizan season =

Partizan
1989–90 season
- President: Ivan Ćurković
- Head coach: Momčilo Vukotić (until 27 September 1989); Ivan Golac (until 29 April 1990); Nenad Bjeković
- Yugoslav First League: 4th
- Yugoslav Cup: Semi-finals
- Yugoslav Super Cup: Winners
- European Cup Winners' Cup: Quarter-finals
- Top goalscorer: League: All: Milko Djurovski

The 1989–90 season was the 44th season in FK Partizan's existence. This article shows player statistics and matches that the club played during the 1989–90 season.

== Competitions ==
=== Yugoslav First League ===
Pos	Team	Pld	W	PKW	PKL	L	GF	GA	GD	Pts	Qualification or relegation
2	Dinamo Zagreb	34	16	8	3	7	53	25	+28	40	Qualification for UEFA Cup first round
3	Hajduk Split	34	18	2	1	13	50	35	+15	38	Banned from European competition (Note: In November 1987, UEFA banned Hajduk Split from European competitions for two seasons. The immediate catalyst for the punishment was crowd trouble during club's 1987–88 European Cup Winners' Cup match against Marseille on 5 November 1987, however, repeated prior incidents at Hajduk's European home matches throughout early-to-mid 1980s (such as the 1983–84 UEFA Cup semifinal first leg infamous 'rooster incident' against Tottenham Hotspur) also contributed to the decision. Since Hajduk's 1987–88 Yugoslav League performance failed to qualify the club for 1988–89 European competition, the punishment was enacted for seasons when Hajduk did manage to qualify: 1989–90 and 1990–91.)
4	Partizan	34	18	1	3	12	51	42	+9	37	Qualification for UEFA Cup first round
5	Rad	34	16	4	2	12	41	31	+10	36	
6	Rijeka	34	14	5	1	14	29	35	−6	33	

Source: rsssf.org
Rules for classification: 1) points; 2) goal difference; 3) number of goals scored.
Notes:

30 July 1989 1	Borac Banja Luka	1–2	Partizan	Banja Luka
			Bajović 5'; Đorđević 69'	Attendance: 13,527

6 August 1989 2	Partizan	0–1	Rijeka	Belgrade
				Stadium: JNA Stadium; Attendance: 8,075

13 August 1989 3	Budućnost	2–0	Partizan	Titograd
				Attendance: 9,916

20 August 1989 4	Partizan	1–1 (3–5 p)	Sarajevo	Belgrade
	Djurovski			Stadium: JNA Stadium; Attendance: 9,081

26 August 1989 5	Rad	1–1 (7–6 p)	Partizan	Belgrade
			Vujačić 38'	Attendance: 6,518

9 September 1989 6	Partizan	2–0	Olimpija	Belgrade
	Dervić 13' (o.g.); Pantić 80'			Stadium: JNA Stadium; Attendance: 6,514

17 September 1989 7	Crvena zvezda	1–0	Partizan	Belgrade
				Attendance: 63,693

23 September 1989 8	Partizan	1–1 (3–4 p)	Dinamo Zagreb	Belgrade
	Petrić 83' (pen.)			Stadium: JNA Stadium; Attendance: 14,035

1 October 1989 9	Spartak Subotica	0–4	Partizan	Subotica
			Bogdanović 42'; Milojević 70'; Bajović 76', 86'	Attendance: 12,101

7 October 1989 10	Partizan	1–0	Sloboda Tuzla	Belgrade
	Đurđević 74'			Stadium: JNA Stadium; Attendance: 5,356

14 October 1989 11	Vojvodina	3–1	Partizan	Novi Sad
			Bogdanović	Attendance: 5,708

22 October 1989 12	Partizan	3–0	Vardar	Belgrade
	Šćepović 21', 36'; Djurovski 51'			Stadium: JNA Stadium; Attendance: 6,920

14 October 1989 13	Željezničar	0–2	Partizan	Sarajevo
			Bajović 17'; Đurđević 24'	Attendance: 10,456

11 November 1989 14	Partizan	6–4	Osijek	Belgrade
	Milojević 13', 88'; Djurovski 15' (pen.); Vujačić 29'; Joksimović 71'; Đurđević 90'			Stadium: JNA Stadium; Attendance: 1,660

19 November 1989 15	Hajduk Split	2–0	Partizan	Split
				Attendance: 20,148

26 November 1989 16	Velež	3–1	Partizan	Mostar
			Stanojković 9'	Attendance: 2,882

3 December 1989 17	Partizan	2–1	Radnički Niš	Belgrade
	Đurđević 34', 56'			Stadium: JNA Stadium; Attendance: 2,776

10 December 1989 18	Partizan	2–1	Borac Banja Luka	Belgrade
	Đurđević 36'; Pantić 65'			Stadium: JNA Stadium; Attendance: 2,174

17 December 1989 19	Rijeka	0–1	Partizan	Rijeka
			Milojević 51'	Stadium: Stadion Kantrida; Attendance: 3,226

18 February 1990 20	Partizan	2–0	Budućnost	Belgrade
	Đurđević 54'; Mijatović ?'			Stadium: JNA Stadium; Attendance: 11,936

25 February 1990 21	Sarajevo	1–2	Partizan	Sarajevo
			Bogdanović 41'; Đurđević 80'	Attendance: 11,360

3 March 1990 22	Partizan	0–2	Rad	Belgrade
				Stadium: JNA Stadium; Attendance: 10,674

11 March 1990 23	Olimpija	5–1	Partizan	Ljubljana
			Djurovski 15' (pen.)	Attendance: 8,430

16 March 1990 24	Partizan	0–2	Crvena zvezda	Belgrade
				Stadium: JNA Stadium; Attendance: 27,989

25 March 1990 25	Dinamo Zagreb	2–1	Partizan	Zagreb
			Joksimović 36'	Attendance: 27,215

1 April 1990 26	Partizan	1–0	Spartak Subotica	Belgrade
	Petrić 20'			Stadium: JNA Stadium; Attendance: 3,872

8 April 1990 27	Sloboda Tuzla	3–1	Partizan	Tuzla
			Petrić 10'	Attendance: 1,873

15 April 1990 28	Partizan	4–0	Vojvodina	Belgrade
	Stevanović 35'; Milojević 39', 41'; Joksimović 70'			Stadium: JNA Stadium; Attendance: 3,920

22 April 1990 29	Vardar	2–3	Partizan	Skopje
			Djurovski 21', 50'; Spasić 85'	Attendance: 6,024

25 April 1990 30	Partizan	0–2	Željezničar	Belgrade
				Stadium: JNA Stadium; Attendance: 2,854

29 April 1990 31	Osijek	0–1	Partizan	Osijek
			Milojević 66'	Attendance: 1,516

6 May 1990 32	Partizan	1–0	Hajduk Split	Belgrade
	Đurđević 33'			Stadium: JNA Stadium; Attendance: 7,074

13 May 1990 33	Partizan	3–0	Velež	Belgrade
	Djurovski 20', 58', 70'			Stadium: JNA Stadium; Attendance: 8,566

16 May 1990 34	Radnički Niš	1–1 (3–5 p)	Partizan	Niš
			Djurovski 24' (pen.)	Attendance: 6,910

=== Yugoslav Cup ===
3 August 1989 Round of 32	Partizan	5–2	Selekcija JNA	Belgrade
	Bajović; Milojević; Đorđević; Stevanović			Stadium: JNA Stadium; Attendance: 15,000

4 October 1989 Round of 16 1st leg	Partizan	3–2	Dinamo Zagreb	Belgrade
	Vujačić 60'; Milojević 84', 89'			Stadium: JNA Stadium

22 November 1989 Round of 16 2nd leg	Dinamo Zagreb	0–1 (2–4 agg.)	Partizan	Zagreb
			Šćepović 31'

29 November 1989 Quarter-finals 1st leg	Velež	1–2	Partizan	Mostar
			Djurovski 34', 80'

6 December 1989 Quarter-finals 2nd leg	Partizan	1–1 (3–2 agg.)	Velež	Belgrade
	Djurovski 60'			Stadium: JNA Stadium; Attendance: 1,000

18 April 1990 Semi-finals 1st leg	Crvena zvezda	1–0	Partizan	Belgrade
	Pančev 24'			Stadium: Marakana; Attendance: 60,000; Referee: Komadinić

2 May 1990 Semi-finals 2nd leg	Partizan	2–3 (2–4 agg.)	Crvena zvezda	Belgrade
	Stevanović 32'; Šćepović 41'		Prosinečki 45'; Šabanadžović 78'; Spasić 80' (o.g.)	Stadium: JNA Stadium; Attendance: 40,000; Referee: Petrović

=== Yugoslav Super Cup ===
23 July 1989	Vojvodina	2–2 (4–5 p)	Partizan	Novi Sad
			Pantić; Bajovic

=== Uhrencup ===
23 July 1989 Semi-finals	Basel	1–1 (0–3 p)	Partizan
			Pantić

23 July 1989 Final	Grenchen	1–2	Partizan
			Pantić; Pantic

=== Cup Winners' Cup ===
==== First round ====
12 September 1989 First round 1st leg	Partizan (Socialist Federal Republic of Yugoslavia)	2–1	(Scotland) Celtic	Mostar, Yugoslavia
	Milojević 21'; Đurđević 55'	Report	M. Galloway 42'	Stadium: Bijeli Brijeg Stadium; Attendance: 15,000; Referee: Helmut Kohl (Austria)

27 September 1989 First round 2nd leg	Celtic (Scotland)	5–4 (6 – 6 a agg.)	(Socialist Federal Republic of Yugoslavia) Partizan	Glasgow, Scotland
	Dziekanowski 25', 47', 55', 80'; Walker 65'	Report	Vujačić 8'; Đorđević 50'; Djurovski 61'; Šćepović 86'	Stadium: Celtic Park; Attendance: 45,298; Referee: Klaus Peschel (Germany)

==== Second round ====
18 October 1989 Second round 1st leg	Groningen (Netherlands)	4–3	(Socialist Federal Republic of Yugoslavia) Partizan	Groningen, Netherlands
	Meijer 16' ten Caat 35'; Roossien 48'; Koevermans 74'	Report	Bajović 32'; Djurovski 45', 83'	Attendance: 20,000; Referee: Henning Lund-Sørensen (Denmark)

1 November 1989 Second round 2nd leg	Partizan (Socialist Federal Republic of Yugoslavia)	3–1 (6 – 5 agg.)	(Netherlands) Groningen	Belgrade, Yugoslavia
	Djurovski 16'; Milojević 83'; Đurđević 90'	Report	ten Caat 80'	Stadium: JNA Stadium; Attendance: 50,000; Referee: Karl-Heinz Tritschler (Germany)

==== Quarter-finals ====
6 March 1990 Quarter-finals 1st leg	Dinamo București (Romania)	2–1	(Socialist Federal Republic of Yugoslavia) Partizan	Bucharest, Romania
	Răducioiu 18', 57'	Report	Spasić 70'	Stadium: Stadionul Dinamo; Attendance: 12,000; Referee: Dušan Krchnák (Czechoslovakia)

21 March 1990 Quarter-finals 2nd leg	Partizan (Socialist Federal Republic of Yugoslavia)	0–2 (1–4 agg.)	(Romania) Dinamo București	Titograd, Yugoslavia
		Report	Lupescu 52'; Răducioiu 70'	Stadium: Pod Gorica Stadium; Attendance: 15,000; Referee: José Rosa dos Santos (Portugal)

== See also ==
- List of FK Partizan seasons
