= 1988–89 FK Partizan season =

Partizan
1988–89 season
- President: Špiro Sinovčić
- Head coach: Fahrudin Jusufi (until 12 September 1988); Momčilo Vukotić
- Yugoslav First League: 6th
- Yugoslav Cup: Winners
- UEFA Cup: Second Round

The 1988–89 season was the 43rd season in FK Partizan's existence. This article shows player statistics and matches that the club played during the 1988–89 season.

== Competitions ==
=== Yugoslav First League ===
Pos	Team	Pld	W	PKW	PKL	L	GF	GA	GD	Pts	Qualification or relegation
4	Rad	34	13	9	2	10	46	38	+8	35	Qualification for UEFA Cup first round
5	Dinamo Zagreb	34	16	2	7	9	42	29	+13	34	Qualification for UEFA Cup first round
6	Partizan	34	15	3	4	12	52	37	+15	33	Qualification for Cup Winners' Cup first round
7	Radnički Niš	34	14	3	4	13	42	35	+7	31	
8	Osijek	34	13	5	2	14	49	50	−1	31	

Source: rsssf.org
Rules for classification: 1) points; 2) goal difference; 3) number of goals scored.

7 August 1988 1	Partizan	0–1	Sloboda Tuzla	Belgrade
				Stadium: JNA Stadium

14 August 1988 2	Partizan	6–1	Sarajevo	Belgrade
	Vučićević 15' (pen.); M. Đukić 59'; V. Đukić 78', 86'; Batrović 82', 88'		Nedić 90' (pen.)	Stadium: JNA Stadium

20 August 1988 3	Hajduk Split	2–2 (0–2 p)	Partizan	Split
	Karačić 32', 83'		Milojević 66', 86'	Stadium: Stadion Poljud; Attendance: 20,725

28 August 1988 4	Partizan	2–0	Dinamo Zagreb	Belgrade
	V. Đukić 6'; Vučićević 53' (pen.)			Stadium: JNA Stadium; Attendance: 35,000

3 September 1988 5	Napredak Kruševac	4–2	Partizan	Kruševac
			Šćepović 61', 68'	Stadium: Mladost Stadium

10 September 1988 6	Partizan	1–1 (3–5 p)	Osijek	Belgrade
	Šćepović 72'		Jerković 68'	Stadium: JNA Stadium; Attendance: 35,000

1 October 1988 7	Rad	0–2	Partizan	Belgrade
			Batrović 20', 54'

9 October 1988 8	Partizan	1–0	Crvena zvezda	Belgrade
	Brnović 1'			Stadium: JNA Stadium; Attendance: 50,000

22 October 1988 9	Željezničar	1–0	Partizan	Sarajevo

30 October 1988 10	Partizan	1–0	Velež	Belgrade
	Klinčarski 84'			Stadium: JNA Stadium

2 November 1988 11	Partizan	0–1	Vardar	Belgrade
				Stadium: JNA Stadium

15 November 1988 12	Rijeka	1–1 (3–4 p)	Partizan	Rijeka

23 November 1988 13	Budućnost	0–0 (4–2 p)	Partizan	Titograd

27 November 1988 14	Partizan	1–1 (2–3 p)	Spartak Subotica	Belgrade
				Stadium: JNA Stadium

4 December 1988 15	Radnički Niš	3–1	Partizan	Niš
	Lukić 5', 41' (pen.), 82' (pen.)		M. Đukić 68'

14 December 1988 16	Partizan	2–2 (10–11 p)	Čelik	Belgrade
	Brnović 48' (pen.), 81'		Milidrag 11', 88'	Stadium: JNA Stadium

18 December 1988 17	Vojvodina	3–2	Partizan	Novi Sad
	Vujačić 29'; Jokanović 42'; Joksimović 46'		V. Đukić 21'; M. Đukić 55'

26 February 1989 18	Sloboda Tuzla	1–0	Partizan	Tuzla

5 March 1989 19	Sarajevo	0–0 (4–5 p)	Partizan	Sarajevo

12 March 1989 20	Partizan	1–0	Hajduk Split	Belgrade
	V. Đukić 13'			Stadium: JNA Stadium

19 March 1989 21	Dinamo Zagreb	2–0	Partizan	Zagreb

26 March 1989 22	Partizan	4–2	Napredak Kruševac	Belgrade
	Vučićević 17', 34', 52'; Batrović 32'		Momčilović 31', 37'	Stadium: JNA Stadium; Attendance: 10,000

2 April 1989 23	Osijek	2–1	Partizan	Osijek
	Vukčević 67'; Šuker 88'		M. Đukić 44'

9 April 1989 24	Partizan	3–0	Budućnost	Belgrade
	Vokrri 25', 32'; Milojević 87'			Stadium: JNA Stadium

16 April 1989 25	Vardar	1–0	Partizan	Skopje
	Simovski 27'

19 April 1989 26	Partizan	3–1	Rad	Belgrade
	Milojević 49'; Vokrri 59' (pen.); Spasić 64'		Kuzmanovski 4'	Stadium: JNA Stadium

3 May 1989 27	Crvena zvezda	3–1	Partizan	Belgrade
	Prosinečki 5'; Jurić 49'; Stošić 60'		Šćepović 23'	Stadium: Marakana; Attendance: 45,000; Referee: Dušan Čolić

6 May 1989 28	Partizan	4–0	Željezničar	Belgrade
	Brnović 27'; Milojević 51'; Vokrri 65'; Šćepović 85'			Stadium: JNA Stadium; Attendance: 5,000

14 May 1989 29	Velež	0–1	Partizan	Mostar
			Milojević 45'

21 May 1989 30	Partizan	1–0	Rijeka	Belgrade
	Vokrri 63'			Stadium: JNA Stadium; Attendance: 10,000

24 May 1989 31	Spartak Subotica	2–0	Partizan	Subotica

28 May 1989 32	Partizan	1–0	Radnički Niš	Belgrade
	Vokrri 29'			Stadium: JNA Stadium; Attendance: 10,000

31 May 1989 33	Čelik	1–4	Partizan	Zenica
	Erak 28'		Erak 24' (o.g.); Batrović 54' (pen.); Šćepović 68'; M. Đukić 73'	Referee: Vasil Kirovski

4 June 1989 34	Partizan	4–1	Vojvodina	Belgrade
	V. Đukić 43', 85'; Milojević 44', 80'		Milovac 8'	Stadium: JNA Stadium

=== Yugoslav Cup ===
3 August 1988 Round of 32	Lovćen	0–1	Partizan	Cetinje
			V. Đukić 41'

17 August 1988 Round of 16 1st leg	Partizan	3–0	Budućnost	Belgrade
	Sredojević 14'; M. Đukić 18'; Milojević 60'			Stadium: JNA Stadium

31 August 1988 Round of 16 2nd leg	Budućnost	1–2 (1–5 agg.)	Partizan	Titograd
			Šćepović 71'; Batrović 89'

30 November 1988 Quarter-finals 1st leg	Partizan	2–1	Crvena zvezda	Belgrade
	V. Đukić 49'; Vokrri 64'		Bursać 76'	Stadium: JNA Stadium; Attendance: 35,000

21 December 1988 Quarter-finals 2nd leg	Crvena zvezda	1–1 (2–3 agg.)	Partizan	Belgrade
	Stošić 57'		Vokrri 80'	Stadium: Marakana; Attendance: 30,000

8 March 1989 Semi-finals 1st leg	Partizan	2–1	Mačva Šabac	Belgrade
	Šćepović 21', 32'		Grujić 5' (pen.)	Stadium: JNA Stadium

23 March 1989 Semi-finals 2nd leg	Mačva Šabac	0–0 (1–2 agg.)	Partizan	Šabac

10 May 1989 Final	Partizan	6–1	Velež	Belgrade
	Vučićević 30' (pen.), 34'; Milojević 52'; Vokrri 55'; Vermezović 58'; Batrović 79'		Repak 65'	Stadium: JNA Stadium; Attendance: 35,000; Referee: Branko Bujić

=== UEFA Cup ===
==== First round ====
7 September 1988 First round 1st leg	Partizan (Socialist Federal Republic of Yugoslavia)	5–0	(Bulgaria) Slavia Sofia	Belgrade, Yugoslavia
18:30	Batrović 7', 29'; V. Đukić 46'; Vokrri 48'; M. Đukić 90'	Report		Stadium: JNA Stadium; Attendance: 25,000

12 October 1988 First round 2nd leg	Slavia Sofia (Bulgaria)	0–5 (0 – 10 agg.)	(Socialist Federal Republic of Yugoslavia) Partizan	Sofia, Bulgaria
17:00		Report	Vokrri 47'; Đorđević 51'; Grekov 73' (o.g.); M. Đukić 79'; V. Đukić 89'

==== Second round ====
26 October 1988 Second round 1st leg	Partizan (Socialist Federal Republic of Yugoslavia)	4–2	(Italy) Roma	Belgrade, Yugoslavia
17:00	V. Đukić 17', 77'; Vermezović 31'; Milojević 54'	Report	Conti 10', 68'	Stadium: JNA Stadium; Attendance: 44,790

9 November 1988 Second round 2nd leg	Roma (Italy)	2–0 (4 – 4 a agg.)	(Socialist Federal Republic of Yugoslavia) Partizan	Rome, Italy
14:30	Völler 20'; Giannini 71' (pen.)	Report		Stadium: Stadio Olimpico; Attendance: 20,755

== See also ==
- List of FK Partizan seasons
