= Komšić =

Komšić is a Bosnian and Croatian surname. Notable people with the surname include:

- Andrea Komšić (born 1996), Croatian alpine skier
- Ivo Komšić (born 1948), Bosnian politician
- Vlado Komšić (born 1955), former Yugoslavian footballer
- Željko Komšić (born 1964), Bosnian politician
