= Milan Đurđević =

Serbian footballer

Personal information
- Full name: Milan Đurđević
- Date of birth: 4 November 1967 (age 58)
- Place of birth: Belgrade, SR Serbia, SFR Yugoslavia
- Height: 1.82 m (6 ft 0 in)
- Position: Striker

Senior career*
Years	Team	Apps	(Gls)
1986–1989	OFK Beograd	58	(24)
1989–1991	Partizan	46	(16)
1991–1993	PAOK	45	(17)
1993–1994	Panachaiki	6	(0)
1994–1995	Mallorca	8	(2)
1995	Leça	1	(0)
1995–1996	Perpignan	12	(1)
1996–1997	Železnik	17	(7)
1997	PAS Giannina		
1998	Kastoria		
Total		193	(67)

International career
1986	Yugoslavia U18	1	(0)
- * Club domestic league appearances and goals

Milan Đurđević (Serbian Cyrillic: Милан Ђурђевић; born 4 November 1967) is a Serbian former professional footballer who played as a striker.

Nicknamed Kempes, due to his physical resemblance to the famous Argentine footballer, Đurđević is best remembered for his stints with Partizan and PAOK.

== Club career ==
Đurđević made his senior debut for OFK Beograd in the second half of the 1985–86 season, as the club suffered relegation from the Yugoslav First League. He spent three more years with the Romantičari, netting 24 goals in the Yugoslav Second League. In August 1989, Đurđević was transferred to Partizan. He spent two seasons at the Stadion JNA, making 59 appearances and scoring 19 goals across all competitions.

In the summer of 1991, Đurđević moved abroad to Greece and signed with PAOK. He stayed there over the next two years, scoring 17 league goals in 45 appearances. After leaving PAOK, Đurđević briefly played for fellow Greek side Panachaiki in the 1993–94 campaign, but failed to help them avoid relegation from the top flight.

In 1994, Đurđević went to Spain and spent one season with Segunda División club Mallorca, receiving limited playing time. He then shortly played for Portuguese club Leça and French club Perpignan, before returning to his homeland.

After a spell at Železnik, Đurđević moved back to Greece, spending half a season with PAS Giannina and another one with Kastoria, before retiring from the game.

== International career ==
Đurđević made one appearance for the Yugoslavia national under-18 team on 27 March 1986, a 3–1 win over Spain, in which Davor Šuker scored a hat-trick.

== Personal life ==
In January 2012, Đurđević got arrested in Thessaloniki, Greece, as one of the leaders of an organized criminal group on charges of extortion, loan-sharking, and racketeering. His daughter Electra plays for PAOK.

== Career statistics ==
Appearances and goals by club, season and competition
Club	Season	League	
Club	Season	Apps	Goals
OFK Beograd	1985–86	4	0
OFK Beograd	1986–87	9	2
OFK Beograd	1987–88	10	1
OFK Beograd	1988–89	31	19
OFK Beograd	1989–90	4	2
OFK Beograd	Total	58	24
Partizan	1989–90	26	9
Partizan	1990–91	20	7
Partizan	Total	46	16
PAOK	1991–92	23	6
PAOK	1992–93	22	11
PAOK	Total	45	17
Panachaiki	1993–94	6	0
Mallorca	1994–95	8	2
Leça	1995–96	1	0
Perpignan	1995–96	12	1
Železnik	1996–97	17	7
PAS Giannina	1997–98		
Kastoria	1997–98		
Career total		193	67
