= Jovica Kolb =

Serbian footballer

Personal information
- Full name: Jovica Kolb
- Date of birth: 24 November 1963 (age 62)
- Place of birth: SFR Yugoslavia
- Height: 1.77 m (5 ft 10 in)
- Position: Midfielder

Senior career*
Years	Team	Apps	(Gls)
1980–1984	Galenika Zemun	51	(2)
1984–1987	Partizan	10	(1)
1987–1988	Sutjeska Nikšić	15	(1)
1988–1990	Partizan	20	(0)
1990–1998	Verbroedering Geel	168	(5)
Total		264	(9)
- * Club domestic league appearances and goals

Jovica Kolb (Serbian Cyrillic: Јовица Колб; born 24 November 1963) is a Serbian retired football player.

== Biography ==
Kolb played mostly as defending midfielder in the Yugoslav First League for Galenika Zemun, Partizan Belgrade and Sutjeska Nikšić, before moving to Belgium, in 1990, where he played with Verbroedering Geel until 1998.

With Partizan, he was the national champion, winning the 1985–86 Yugoslav First League and 1986–87 Yugoslav First League. Kolb also won a Yugoslav Cup and Yugoslav Super Cup in 1989.
