= Fadil Vokrri =

Albanian football administrator and formerly Yugoslav footballer (1960–2018)

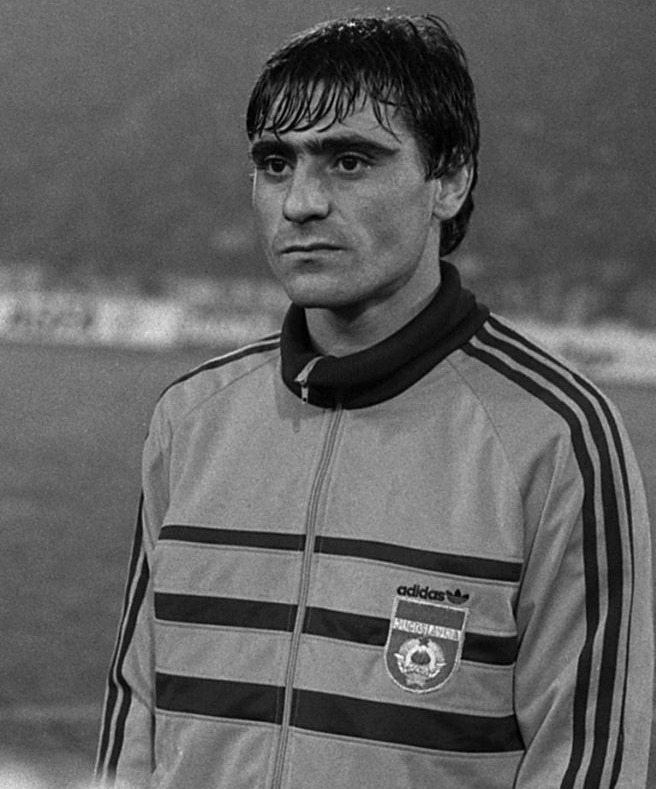
- Vokrri with Yugoslavia in 1987

President of Football Federation of Kosovo
- In office 16 February 2008 – 9 June 2018
- Vice President: Agim Ademi; Bekim Haxhiu; Predrag Jović
- Preceded by: Sabri Hashani
- Succeeded by: Agim Ademi

Personal details
- Born: Fadil Avdullah Vokrri; 23 July 1960 Podujevë, PR Serbia, FPR Yugoslavia (modern Kosovo)
- Died: 9 June 2018 (aged 57) Pristina, Kosovo
- Occupation: Footballer; Football administrator
Association football career
- Position: Striker
Youth career
- 1976–1979: Llapi
Senior career*
Years	Team	Apps	(Gls)
1980–1986	Prishtina	172	(55)
1986–1989	Partizan	55	(18)
1989–1990	Nîmes	24	(13)
1990–1992	Fenerbahçe	43	(13)
1992–1993	Bourges	30	(10)
1993–1995	Montluçon	39	(12)
Total		363	(121)
International career
1984–1987	Yugoslavia	12	(6)
- * Club domestic league appearances and goals

Fadil Avdullah Vokrri (23 July 1960 – 9 June 2018) was a Kosovan football administrator and former Yugoslav professional football player. He served as president of the Football Federation of Kosovo from 16 February 2008 until his death in 2018.

Vokrri played as a striker and began his youth career with his hometown club Llapi before establishing himself at Prishtina, where he made 172 league appearances and scored 55 goals between 1980 and 1986. He later played for Partizan, Nîmes, Fenerbahçe, Bourges, and Montluçon, accumulating 121 career goals in 363 club appearances.

At international level, Vokrri represented the Yugoslavia national team, earning 12 caps and scoring 6 goals between 1984 and 1987.

After retiring as a player, he became a football administrator and was elected president of the Football Federation of Kosovo in 2008, a position he held until his passing on 9 June 2018 in Pristina.

== Early life ==
Born in Podujevë, SFR Yugoslavia (modern Kosovo) to ethnic Albanian parents, Vokrri was known for his Diego Maradona-like approach with quick movement and strong shooting (where he established his strong shooting reputation at FC Prishtina). He won a number of international caps for the former Yugoslavia in the mid-1980s and was unlucky to not win more caps where he was one of Yugoslavia's favourite football talents. He played in a star-studded lineup that included Agim Cana, Edmond Rugova and Fadil Muriqi, as well as other Kosovan players who were part of the Golden Generation in the 1980s. Vokrri's FC Prishtina went on to beat Red Star Belgrade at the Red Star Stadium and record a historic away victory for the Kosovan team.

== Club career ==
Vokrri scored a total of 121 goals and had 363 club appearances, he began his career at the age of 16 years old at Llapi. He then moved to Prishtina in 1980 and played there until 1986, scoring 55 goals and making 172 appearances. Vokrri was very successful with Partizan from Belgrade where he scored 18 goals and had 55 appearances. He was key to both the team claiming the 1986–87 Yugoslav First League title, and their successful run in the 1988–89 Yugoslav Cup, notably scoring in the final as Partizan won 6–1 against Velež Mostar.

Juventus showed interest in signing Vokrri during the late 1980s. He could not join because "[he] hadn't completed the then-compulsory two years' military service". He also played for Nîmes Olympique, Fenerbahçe where he played for the successful coach Guus Hiddink. Vokrri was a favourite of Fenerbahçe fans but was not as productive as he was with FC Prishtina and Partizan because of his older age.

== Post-retirement ==
"For me the idol of all time is Johan Cruyff. His philosophy in the football game has laid the foundations of the Barcelona game that plays that way. Barcelona is art, it's a pleasure to see when it plays. There is Messi."

— Fadil Vokrri in an interview for Telegrafi in December 2017

After the Kosovo War ended, Vokrri returned to his country and became the sporting director of Prishtina. On 16 February 2008, he was elected as the president of the Football Federation of Kosovo for a four-year mandate.

== Personal life ==
Vokrri and his wife Edita had two sons, Gramozi and Albert, and a daughter named Albana. He had a degree in the Faculty of Management and Business. Apart from his native Albanian, he was also fluent in French, Serbian and Turkish. On 17 May 2018, he earned his Albanian passport.

== Death ==
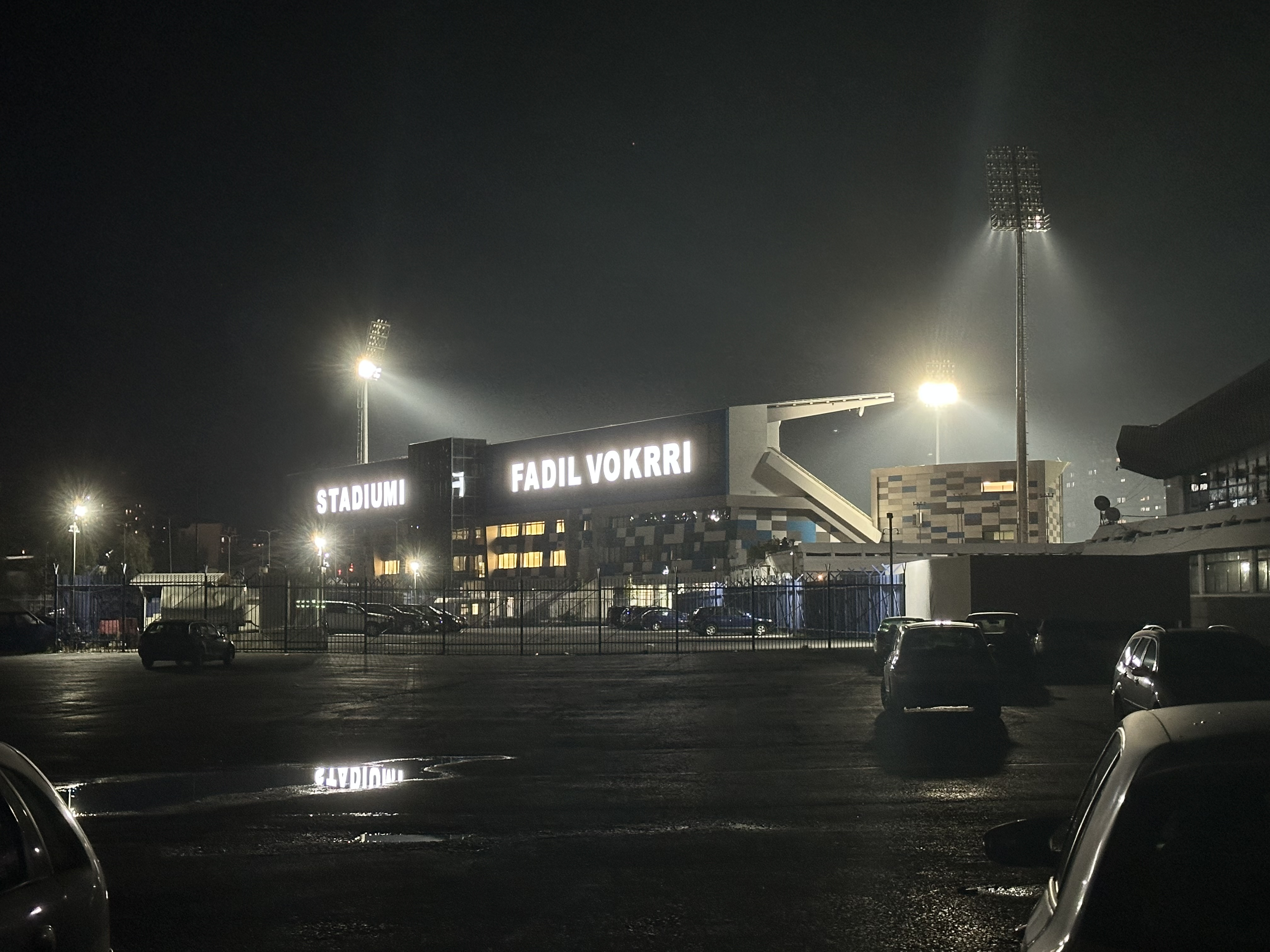
Fadil Vokrri Stadium, 2023

On 9 June 2018, Vokrri suffered a heart attack while he was exercising and died on his way to the emergency room. Later that day, the Prishtina City Stadium was renamed to the Fadil Vokrri Stadium in his honor.

Vokrri was given a state funeral on 10 June 2018 and was buried at the Pristina City Cemetery. President of Kosovo Hashim Thaçi marked the day as a national day of mourning, with all flags lowered at half mast across Kosovo, and at embassies all over the world.

== Career statistics ==
=== Club ===
Appearances and goals by club, season and competition
Club	Season	League			Cup (Note: Cup appearances are missing)		Europe (Note: Including continental competitions, such as UEFA Cup)		Total	
Club	Season	Division	Apps	Goals	Apps	Goals	Apps	Goals	Apps	Goals
Prishtina	1980–81	Yugoslav Second League	25	5	0	0	—		25	5
Prishtina	1981–82	Yugoslav Second League	27	13	0	0	—		27	13
Prishtina	1982–83	Yugoslav Second League	32	15	0	0	—		32	15
Prishtina	1983–84	Yugoslav First League	31	9	0	0	—		31	9
Prishtina	1984–85	Yugoslav First League	30	8	0	0	—		30	8
Prishtina	1985–86	Yugoslav First League	27	5	0	0	—		27	5
Prishtina	Total		172	55	0	0	—		172	55
Partizan	1986–87	Yugoslav First League	28	5	0	0	2	0	30	5
Partizan	1987–88	Yugoslav First League	11	6	0	0	2	1	13	7
Partizan	1988–89	Yugoslav First League	16	7	1	1	4	2	20	9
Partizan	Total		55	18	1	1	8	3	63	21
Nîmes	1989–90	French Division 2	24	13	0	0	—		24	13
Fenerbahçe	1990–91	1.Lig	21	6	2	1	4	2	27	9
Fenerbahçe	1991–92	1.Lig	22	7	1	0	0	0	23	7
Fenerbahçe	Total		43	13	3	1	4	2	50	16
Bourges	1992–93	French Division 2	30	10	0	0	—		30	10
Montluçon	1993–94	Championnat National 2	26	11	0	0	—		23	11
Montluçon	1994–95	Championnat National 2	13	1	0	0	—		13	1
Montluçon	Total		39	12	0	0	—		39	12
Career total			363	121	4	2	12	5	379	128

=== International ===
Appearances and goals by national team and year
National team	Year	Apps	Goals
Yugoslavia	1984	3	2
Yugoslavia	1985	6	2
Yugoslavia	1986	0	0
Yugoslavia	1987	3	2
Total		12	6

Scores and results list Yugoslavia's goal tally first, score column indicates score after each Vokrri goal.

List of international goals scored by Fadil Vokrri
No.	Date	Venue	Opponent	Score	Result	Competition
1	12 September 1984	Hampden Park, Glasgow, Scotland	Scotland	1–0	1–6	Friendly
2	20 October 1984	Zentralstadion, Leipzig, East Germany	East Germany	2–2	3–2	1986 FIFA World Cup qualification
3	1 February 1985	Maharaja's College Stadium, Kochi, India	South Korea	1–0	3–1	1985 Nehru Cup
4	1 May 1985	Stade Municipal, Luxembourg City, Luxembourg	Luxembourg	1–0	1–0	1986 FIFA World Cup qualification
5	14 October 1987	Grbavica Stadium, Sarajevo, SFR Yugoslavia	Northern Ireland	1–0	3–0	UEFA Euro 1988 qualifying
6	14 October 1987	Grbavica Stadium, Sarajevo, SFR Yugoslavia	Northern Ireland	2–0	3–0	UEFA Euro 1988 qualifying

== Honors ==
Partizan

- Yugoslav First League: 1986–87
- Yugoslav Cup: 1988–89
