= 1986–87 Yugoslav First League =

Prva savezna liga Jugoslavije
- Season: 1986–87
- Dates: 10 August 1986 – 14 June 1987
- Champions: Partizan
- Relegated: Dinamo Vinkovci; Spartak Subotica
- European Cup: Vardar
- UEFA Cup: Partizan; Velež; Red Star
- Cup Winners' Cup: Hajduk Split
- Top goalscorer: Radmilo Mihajlović (23)

The 1986–87 Yugoslav First League title was awarded to FK Partizan, as the 6 points deduction that originally made Vardar Skopje champions, was declared invalid.

== League table ==
Pos	Team	Pld	W	D	L	GF	GA	GD	Pts	Qualification or relegation
1	Partizan (C)	34	16	11	7	58	29	+29	43	Qualification for UEFA Cup first round
2	Velež	34	19	4	11	65	46	+19	42	Qualification for UEFA Cup first round
3	Red Star Belgrade	34	16	9	9	57	37	+20	41	Qualification for UEFA Cup first round
4	Rijeka	34	14	10	10	44	42	+2	38	
5	Vardar	34	15	8	11	40	39	+1	38	Qualification for European Cup first round
6	Dinamo Zagreb	34	14	9	11	49	43	+6	37	
7	Budućnost	34	14	9	11	40	36	+4	37	
8	Hajduk Split	34	14	8	12	41	41	0	36	Qualification for Cup Winners' Cup first round
9	Željezničar	34	14	6	14	55	46	+9	34	
10	Sutjeska Nikšić	34	12	10	12	50	52	−2	34	
11	Osijek	34	15	4	15	40	44	−4	34	
12	Čelik Zenica	34	14	5	15	48	52	−4	33	
13	Sarajevo	34	12	9	13	39	49	−10	33	
14	Priština	34	11	7	16	35	48	−13	29	
15	Sloboda Tuzla	34	9	10	15	38	44	−6	28	
16	Radnički Niš	34	9	10	15	29	39	−10	28	
17	Dinamo Vinkovci (R)	34	10	8	16	29	51	−22	28	Relegation to Yugoslav Second League
18	Spartak Subotica (R)	34	5	9	20	30	49	−19	19	Relegation to Yugoslav Second League

Source: rsssf.org
Rules for classification: 1) points; 2) goal difference; 3) number of goals scored.
(C) Champions; (R) Relegated

Standing before the court annulled point deductions:

Pos	Team	Pld	W	D	L	GF	GA	GD	Pts
1	Vardar	34	15	8	11	40	39	+1	38
2	Partizan (Note: 6 points were deducted)	34	16	11	7	58	29	+29	37
3	Velež	34	19	4	11	65	46	+19	36
4	Hajduk Split	34	14	8	12	41	41	0	36
5	Red Star Belgrade	34	16	9	9	57	37	+20	35
6	Osijek	34	15	4	15	40	44	−4	34
7	Rijeka	34	14	10	10	44	42	+2	32
8	Dinamo Zagreb	34	14	9	11	49	43	+6	31
9	Budućnost	34	14	9	11	40	36	+4	31
10	Priština	34	11	7	16	35	48	−13	29
11	Željezničar	34	14	6	14	55	46	+9	28
12	Sutjeska Nikšić	34	12	10	12	50	52	−2	28
13	Sloboda Tuzla	34	9	10	15	38	44	−6	28
14	Radnički Niš	34	9	10	15	29	39	−10	28
15	Dinamo Vinkovci	34	10	8	16	29	51	−22	28
16	Čelik Zenica	34	14	5	15	48	52	−4	27
17	Sarajevo	34	12	9	13	39	49	−10	27
18	Spartak Subotica	34	5	9	20	30	49	−19	19

Rules for classification: 1) points; 2) goal difference; 3) number of goals scored.

== Results ==
Home \ Away	BUD	ČEL	DVI	DZG	HAJ	OSI	PAR	PRI	RNI	RSB	RIJ	SAR	SLO	SPA	SUT	VAR	VEL	ŽEL
Budućnost		2–1	2–1	2–1	0–0	1–0	1–1	2–1	2–0	0–2	2–0	1–1	2–1	1–2	1–1	3–0	2–0	2–0
Čelik	1–3		3–0	4–2	3–1	2–0	1–1	2–1	2–0	1–2	2–2	2–0	1–0	3–2	3–1	3–1	2–5	2–1
Dinamo Vinkovci	1–1	1–1		0–0	1–0	0–0	0–3	1–0	4–1	0–0	1–1	2–0	2–0	2–1	1–1	2–1	2–1	2–3
Dinamo Zagreb	1–0	2–0	2–1		3–3	2–1	2–1	1–1	1–0	1–2	1–0	4–0	0–0	1–1	2–2	4–1	2–0	2–1
Hajduk Split	1–2	2–0	2–0	0–4		2–0	2–1	1–0	3–2	1–1	2–0	1–2	0–1	2–1	2–1	0–0	1–1	1–0
Osijek	2–1	3–2	2–3	1–0	0–2		2–0	1–1	0–0	2–1	1–0	2–1	3–0	1–0	1–2	1–0	4–2	3–2
Partizan	1–1	2–1	5–0	1–2	4–1	2–0		5–1	3–1	2–0	1–1	1–0	3–0	2–0	2–0	2–2	3–0	0–1
Priština	1–0	3–2	0–1	2–0	1–1	2–1	0–0		1–0	0–1	3–1	0–1	2–0	1–0	3–0	1–3	1–0	4–4
Radnički Niš	1–1	1–0	1–0	0–0	2–0	0–0	0–1	3–0		1–1	3–1	2–0	1–1	1–0	1–1	0–0	2–0	1–0
Red Star	1–2	0–1	3–0	5–2	2–1	4–1	3–1	0–0	1–1		3–1	2–3	2–1	3–1	2–1	1–0	2–2	6–1
Rijeka	2–2	0–0	2–1	3–0	2–2	2–1	0–3	1–0	1–0	2–1		5–2	2–0	2–1	1–0	3–1	3–1	2–1
Sarajevo	2–1	0–1	1–0	1–1	2–2	0–1	1–1	4–0	2–1	2–1	0–0		1–0	3–1	2–1	1–0	1–1	1–1
Sloboda Tuzla	1–0	5–0	3–0	1–1	1–0	0–1	1–3	0–0	1–0	2–2	0–0	2–2		2–0	7–0	1–1	2–1	0–0
Spartak Subotica	2–0	2–1	0–0	1–2	0–1	1–2	1–1	1–2	2–1	1–1	0–1	0–0	1–1		1–1	1–1	1–2	1–0
Sutjeska	2–0	1–1	2–0	2–1	3–2	2–1	0–0	2–1	5–0	1–1	0–0	3–0	5–1	2–0		2–2	0–2	2–1
Vardar	0–0	2–0	2–0	2–0	1–0	1–0	0–0	2–0	2–0	1–0	2–0	3–2	1–0	2–1	4–2		0–3	2–1
Velež	4–0	1–0	5–0	3–2	0–1	3–1	1–1	3–1	2–1	1–0	4–2	2–0	4–3	2–1	3–1	2–0		4–2
Željezničar	1–0	3–0	2–0	1–0	0–1	3–1	3–1	4–1	1–1	0–1	1–1	4–1	3–0	2–2	3–1	3–0	2–0	

Source: DataSoccer.it
Legend: Blue = home team win; Yellow = draw; Red = away team win.

== Winning squad ==
Champions: FK Partizan
Player	League	
Player	Matches	Goals
Fahrudin Omerović (goalkeeper)	34	0
Milko Đurovski	31	19
Goran Stevanović	31	4
Admir Smajić	31	3
Srečko Katanec	30	3
Vladimir Vermezović	29	1
Nebojša Vučićević	28	7
Fadil Vokrri	28	5
Miodrag Bajović	27	2
Miloš Đelmaš	26	7
Bajro Župić	26	0
Vlado Čapljić	24	1
Isa Sadriu	18	0
Goran Bogdanović	17	1
Aleksandar Đorđević	16	2
Milinko Pantić	15	3
Slađan Šćepović	6	0
Ljubomir Radanović	5	0
Darko Milanič	4	0
Miodrag Radović	4	0
Darko Belojević		
Head coach: Nenad Bjeković

=== Winning squad before the court annulment ===
Champions: FK Vardar
Player
Momčilo Grošev (goalkeeper)
Boban Babunski
Čedomir Janevski
Dragi Kanatlarovski
Ljupčo Markovski
Ilija Najdoski
Vujadin Stanojković
Jovče Džipunov
Vasil Ringov
Toni Savevski
Tome Trajanovski
Petar Georgijevski
Slobodan Goračinov
Nikola Ilievski
Toni Anastasovski
Zoran Boškovski
Darko Pančev
Mirko Petrov
Venceslav Simonovski
Milko Simovski
Zoran Trajčevski
Head coach: Andon Dončevski

== Top scorers ==
Rank	Player	Club	Goals
1	(Socialist Federal Republic of Yugoslavia) Radmilo Mihajlović	Željezničar	23
2	(Socialist Federal Republic of Yugoslavia) Janko Janković	Rijeka	20
3	(Socialist Federal Republic of Yugoslavia) Milko Đurovski	Partizan	19
4	(Socialist Federal Republic of Yugoslavia) Darko Pančev	Vardar	18
5	(Socialist Federal Republic of Yugoslavia) Dragan Stojković	Red Star	17
6	(Socialist Federal Republic of Yugoslavia) Predrag Jurić	Velež	16
7	(Socialist Federal Republic of Yugoslavia) Dragan Jakovljević	Sarajevo	15
8	(Socialist Federal Republic of Yugoslavia) Boro Cvetković	Red Star	13

== See also ==
- 1986–87 Yugoslav Second League
- 1986–87 Yugoslav Cup
