= Milko Djurovski =

Macedonian footballer (born 1963)

Milko Gjurovski
Personal information
- Date of birth: 26 January 1963 (age 63)
- Place of birth: Tetovo, PR Macedonia, FPR Yugoslavia
- Height: 1.78 m (5 ft 10 in)
- Position: Striker

Youth career
- Teteks
- 1977–1979: Red Star Belgrade

Senior career*
Years	Team	Apps	(Gls)
1979–1986	Red Star Belgrade	115	(54)
1979–1980	→ Čukarički (loan)		
1986–1990	Partizan	70	(38)
1990–1993	Groningen	71	(28)
1993	→ Cambuur (loan)	7	(0)
1994	Maribor	19	(8)
1994	Nîmes	4	(0)
1995–1996	Železničar Maribor		
1998	Kansas City Attack (indoor)	1	(0)
2001	Rogoza		
2002	Bistrica	11	(16)
2002	Malečnik	1	(1)
2003	Rudar Prijedor		
2003	Bistrica	3	(2)
2004	Ljubljana	2	(0)
2005	Malečnik		
2005	Bežigrad		
Total		304	(147)

International career
1984	Yugoslavia Olympic	2	(0)
1984–1985	Yugoslavia	6	(2)
1994	Macedonia	3	(0)

Managerial career
- 1998: Železničar Maribor
- 2003: Rudar Prijedor (player-manager)
- 2005: Malečnik (player-manager)
- 2005–2006: Drava Ptuj
- 2006–2007: Nafta Lendava
- 2007: Maribor
- 2008–2009: Vardar
- 2009: Belasica
- 2010: Drava Ptuj
- 2010–2011: Jedinstvo Brčko
- 2012: Pöllau
- 2015: Zlaté Moravce
- 2015: Zavrč
- 2016: Slavija Sarajevo
- 2019–2020: Veržej
Medal record
Representing Yugoslavia
Bronze medal – third place	Olympic Games	1984
- * Club domestic league appearances and goals

Milko Djurovski (Macedonian: Милко Ѓуровски, romanized: Milko Gjurovski, Serbo-Croatian: Milko Đurovski / Милко Ђуровски; born 26 January 1963) is a Macedonian former professional footballer and manager. He was regarded as one of the most talented Yugoslav players of his generation.

Djurovski started out at Red Star Belgrade, making his senior debut in 1979, aged 16. He spent a total of seven seasons in their first team, winning two national championships (1981 and 1984) and two national cups (1982 and 1985). In the summer of 1986, Djurovski made a surprising and controversial move to Red Star's bitter rivals Partizan. He stayed for four years at Stadion JNA, including an inactive season because of his compulsory military service. Some of his most memorable performances with the Crno-beli include a 1989–90 European Cup Winners' Cup tie against Groningen, which eventually secured him a transfer to the Dutch club in 1990. In his later years, Djurovski went on to play for several Slovenian clubs.

Internationally, Djurovski represented both Yugoslavia and Macedonia. He earned six caps for Yugoslavia between 1984 and 1985, scoring two goals. After the dissolution of the former country, Djurovski briefly played for his native Macedonia, making three appearances in 1994. He had previously won the bronze medal for Yugoslavia at the 1984 Summer Olympics.

His older brother is Boško Djurovski, while his younger son is Mario Gjurovski.

== Club career ==
Born in Tetovo, Djurovski joined the youth categories of his hometown club Teteks. He subsequently moved to Red Star Belgrade in 1977. Still a junior, Djurovski made his senior debut for the club on 11 April 1979, coming on as a substitute for Duško Lukić in the first leg of the UEFA Cup semi-final, a 1–0 win over Hertha BSC. He spent the following 1979–80 season on loan at Čukarički, becoming the Serbian League (Group North) top scorer with 15 goals. After returning from a loan spell, Djurovski helped Red Star win the Yugoslav First League in the 1980–81 campaign, scoring five goals in the process. He was an integral part of the team and a fan favorite in the following years, leading them to another league title in 1984.

In the summer of 1986, Djurovski switched to Partizan in a move that caused much controversy among fans and the general public. He immediately established himself as the club's key player, being their top scorer in the 1986–87 season, as Partizan won the league title. Afterwards, Djurovski spent the following three seasons with the Crno-beli, including one year of his military service.

In the summer of 1990, Djurovski moved abroad and signed with Dutch club Groningen. He was the club's top league scorer in his debut season at Oosterpark with 14 goals, leading them to a third place, behind PSV and Ajax. In the following 1991–92 season, Djurovski again helped the club to secure a spot in the UEFA Cup. He was then loaned to fellow Eredivisie club Cambuur in 1993. After returning to Groningen, Djurovski spent another few months at the club, before eventually leaving the country in the winter of 1994.

After leaving Groningen, Djurovski moved to the newly independent Slovenia and signed with Maribor in early 1994. He later moved to French side Nîmes, but left the club after only a few games in December 1994. Later on, Djurovski made a return to Slovenia and joined Second League club Železničar Maribor in the summer of 1995. He then moved to the United States and briefly played indoor soccer for the Kansas City Attack in 1998, alongside his former Partizan teammate Nebojša Vučićević.

In the early 2000s, Djurovski came out of retirement and went on to play for Slovenian Third League clubs Rogoza, Bistrica (twice), and Malečnik. He then served as player-manager of Bosnian club Rudar Prijedor in 2003. Afterwards, Djurovski made two appearances for Ljubljana in the First League, before the club dissolved at the end of the 2004–05 season. He later served as player-manager of Malečnik, before joining newly formed Slovenian club Bežigrad in July 2005. Djurovski appeared in a couple of matches for the club, before definitely retiring from the game, aged 42.

== International career ==
Djurovski made his full international debut for Yugoslavia on 31 March 1984, coming on as a substitute for Miloš Šestić and scoring the game's opener in a 2–1 friendly win over Hungary. He subsequently represented the country at the 1984 Summer Olympics, as the team won the bronze medal, defeating Italy in the third place match. In 1985, Djurovski made five more appearances for the senior team and scored once.

In 1994, Djurovski accepted a call-up to represent the country of his birth. He made his senior debut for Macedonia in an October 1994 European Championship qualification match against Spain in Skopje and earned a total of 3 caps, scoring no goals. His final international was a December 1994 European Championship qualification match against Cyprus.

== Managerial career ==
After his stint at Železničar Maribor as a player, Djurovski was appointed manager of the club ahead of the 1998–99 season. He was eventually unable to perform his function due to the problems with his license.

In October 2005, Djurovski was appointed manager of Drava Ptuj. He left the club in July 2006. Shortly after, Djurovski was appointed manager of Nafta Lendava. He left them in August 2007. Two weeks later, Djurovski became manager of his former club Maribor, penning a two-year deal. He was released on 5 November 2007. In October 2008, Djurovski returned to his native country, being named manager of Vardar. He left the club in January 2009. Later that year, Djurovski served as manager of fellow Macedonian club Belasica.

Subsequently, Djurovski returned to Slovenia and took charge at Drava Ptuj for the second time, before leaving the position in April 2010. He also served as manager of Austrian club Pöllau in 2012. In June 2015, Djurovski was appointed manager of Slovak club Zlaté Moravce. He once again returned to Slovenia and took charge at Zavrč in October 2015. In March 2016, Djurovski became manager of Bosnian club Slavija Sarajevo. He left the club only two months later after failing to avoid relegation from the top flight.

== Personal life ==
Djurovski has two sons including Mario Djurovski, a professional footballer. He is also the younger brother of Boško Djurovski. They played together at both club and international level.

== Career statistics ==
=== Club ===
Appearances and goals by club, season and competition
Club	Season	League		Continental		Total	
Club	Season	Apps	Goals	Apps	Goals	Apps	Goals
Red Star Belgrade	1978–79	1	0	1	0	2	0
Red Star Belgrade	1980–81	9	5	1	0	10	5
Red Star Belgrade	1981–82	19	8	4	0	23	8
Red Star Belgrade	1982–83	15	6	2	2	17	8
Red Star Belgrade	1983–84	27	13	2	1	29	14
Red Star Belgrade	1984–85	23	9	0	0	23	9
Red Star Belgrade	1985–86	21	13	2	1	23	14
Čukarički (loan)	1979–80			—			
Partizan	1986–87	31	19	0	0	31	19
Partizan	1987–88	16	9	1	0	17	9
Partizan	1988–89	0	0	0	0	0	0
Partizan	1989–90	23	10	6	4	29	14
Groningen	1990–91	28	14	—		28	14
Groningen	1991–92	25	7	2	0	27	7
Groningen	1992–93	4	2	1	0	5	2
Groningen	1993–94	14	5	—		14	5
Cambuur (loan)	1992–93	7	0	—		7	0
Maribor	1993–94	9	4	0	0	9	4
Maribor	1994–95	10	4	2	3	12	7
Nîmes	1994–95	4	0	—		4	0
Železničar Maribor	1995–96			—			
Kansas City Attack (indoor)	1997–98	1	0	—		1	0
Rogoza	2000–01			—			
Bistrica	2001–02	11	16	—		11	16
Malečnik	2002–03	1	1	—		1	1
Rudar Prijedor	2002–03			—			
Bistrica	2003–04	3	2	—		3	2
Ljubljana	2004–05	2	0	—		2	0
Malečnik	2004–05			—			
Bežigrad	2005–06			—			
Career total		304	147	24	11	328	158

=== International ===
Appearances and goals by national team and year
National team	Year	Apps	Goals
Yugoslavia	1984	1	1
Yugoslavia	1985	5	1
Total		6	2
Macedonia	1994	3	0
Total		3	0

== Honours ==
=== Player ===
Red Star Belgrade

- Yugoslav First League: 1980–81, 1983–84
- Yugoslav Cup: 1981–82, 1984–85

Partizan

- Yugoslav First League: 1986–87
- Yugoslav Cup: 1988–89
- Yugoslav Super Cup: 1989

Yugoslavia

- Olympic Games: Bronze Medal 1984
