= 1985–86 Yugoslav First League =

Prva savezna liga Jugoslavije
- Season: 1985–86
- Dates: 11 August 1985 – 29 June 1986
- Champions: Partizan
- Relegated: OFK Belgrade; Vojvodina
- European Cup: Red Star
- UEFA Cup: Partizan; Hajduk Split; Rijeka
- Cup Winners' Cup: Velež
- Top goalscorer: Davor Čop (22)
- Average attendance: 8,507

The 1985–86 Yugoslav First League season was marked by scandal and controversy due to allegedly wide match-fixing during the last week of fixtures.

== Summary ==
After the last week was played, FK Partizan was crowned champion due to better goal difference than second-placed Red Star Belgrade. However, after weeks of public pressure and huge public outcry, on 20 June 1986, the Yugoslav FA presidency headed by Slavko Šajber decided to impose extraordinary measures that included the following:

- voiding the already played week 34 matches of the 1985–86 season and ordering a replay of every single one (nine fixtures in total)
- docking 6 points from each of the 12 clubs suspected of being involved in match-fixing, meaning they would start the following league season with -6 points

Each club agreed to play the replay except for Partizan. As a result their week 34 fixture was registered as a 3–0 defeat, and the club was thus stripped of the league title, which was now awarded to Red Star. Based on this decision, it was Red Star Belgrade who got to represent SFR Yugoslavia in the 1986–87 European Cup.

What followed on domestic front was a series of appeals and lawsuits and the entire case eventually went all the way to the Yugoslav Constitutional Court. By the time Yugoslav Constitutional Court delivered its final ruling to the Court of Joint Labour of SR Serbia on 29 July 1987, the next league season was already completed with FK Vardar winning the title due to 12 teams starting the season with -6 points.

The court's ruling was that there was no evidence of wrongdoing in the week 34 of the 1985–86 season and thus that season's title was given back to Partizan. That also meant that there was no merit for the 6-point docking in the 1986–87 and now that season's table was re-counted so that now Partizan became a new champion.

Still, Vardar got to represent SFR Yugoslavia in the 1987–88 European Cup.

== League table ==
| Pos | Team | Pld | W | D | L | GF | GA | GD | Pts | Qualification or relegation |
|---|---|---|---|---|---|---|---|---|---|---|
| 1 | Partizan (C) | 34 | 21 | 7 | 6 | 65 | 29 | +36 | 49 | Qualification for UEFA Cup first round |
| 2 | Red Star Belgrade | 34 | 21 | 7 | 6 | 73 | 38 | +35 | 49 | Qualification for European Cup first round |
| 3 | Velež | 34 | 13 | 11 | 10 | 64 | 50 | +14 | 37 | Qualification for Cup Winners' Cup first round |
| 4 | Hajduk Split | 34 | 15 | 7 | 12 | 55 | 44 | +11 | 37 | Qualification for UEFA Cup first round |
| 5 | Rijeka | 34 | 12 | 13 | 9 | 42 | 31 | +11 | 37 | Qualification for UEFA Cup first round |
| 6 | Dinamo Zagreb | 34 | 11 | 14 | 9 | 53 | 43 | +10 | 36 | |
| 7 | Željezničar | 34 | 15 | 5 | 14 | 58 | 63 | −5 | 35 | |
| 8 | Vardar | 34 | 14 | 6 | 14 | 52 | 59 | −7 | 34 | |
| 9 | Osijek | 34 | 12 | 9 | 13 | 39 | 42 | −3 | 33 | |
| 10 | Sutjeska Nikšić | 34 | 14 | 4 | 16 | 55 | 61 | −6 | 32 | |
| 11 | Priština | 34 | 13 | 6 | 15 | 37 | 47 | −10 | 32 | |
| 12 | Sloboda Tuzla | 34 | 11 | 9 | 14 | 47 | 59 | −12 | 31 | |
| 13 | Dinamo Vinkovci | 34 | 11 | 8 | 15 | 51 | 54 | −3 | 30 | |
| 14 | Budućnost | 34 | 13 | 4 | 17 | 47 | 52 | −5 | 30 | |
| 15 | Sarajevo | 34 | 11 | 8 | 15 | 41 | 46 | −5 | 30 | |
| 16 | Čelik | 34 | 11 | 8 | 15 | 39 | 49 | −10 | 30 | |
| 17 | OFK Belgrade (R) | 34 | 12 | 6 | 16 | 48 | 63 | −15 | 30 | Relegation to Yugoslav Second League |
| 18 | Vojvodina (R) | 34 | 6 | 8 | 20 | 33 | 69 | −36 | 20 | Relegation to Yugoslav Second League |

Source: rsssf.org
Rules for classification: 1) points; 2) goal difference; 3) number of goals scored.
(C) Champions; (R) Relegated

== Results ==
| Home \ Away | BUD | ČEL | DVI | DZG | HAJ | OFK | OSI | PAR | PRI | RSB | RIJ | SAR | SLO | SUT | VAR | VEL | VOJ | ŽEL |
|---|---|---|---|---|---|---|---|---|---|---|---|---|---|---|---|---|---|---|
| Budućnost | | 3–1 | 2–0 | 1–3 | 0–0 | 2–0 | 4–0 | 1–0 | 0–0 | 0–4 | 2–1 | 2–1 | 3–1 | 2–1 | 2–0 | 3–2 | 2–0 | 0–1 |
| Čelik | 3–1 | | 3–1 | 0–1 | 1–0 | 3–0 | 0–0 | 0–2 | 2–0 | 0–0 | 1–1 | 2–0 | 4–1 | 2–1 | 0–1 | 1–0 | 4–2 | 1–0 |
| Dinamo Vinkovci | 1–2 | 2–2 | | 0–1 | 3–1 | 2–1 | 4–0 | 1–4 | 5–0 | 2–1 | 2–1 | 1–1 | 1–1 | 3–1 | 2–0 | 3–0 | 1–1 | 1–1 |
| Dinamo Zagreb | 1–0 | 1–0 | 0–2 | | 1–1 | 2–0 | 1–1 | 2–3 | 4–3 | 3–1 | 0–0 | 1–1 | 0–0 | 1–1 | 2–2 | 4–4 | 2–2 | 3–2 |
| Hajduk Split | 2–0 | 2–0 | 5–3 | 1–0 | | 3–1 | 1–1 | 2–1 | 2–2 | 0–1 | 1–0 | 6–2 | 3–0 | 3–1 | 4–1 | 2–1 | 2–0 | 5–0 |
| OFK Belgrade | 4–3 | 1–0 | 0–0 | 1–1 | 3–1 | | 3–0 | 0–0 | 2–1 | 3–1 | 1–3 | 2–0 | 5–0 | 4–2 | 1–3 | 2–2 | 2–1 | 1–1 |
| Osijek | 4–1 | 2–1 | 3–2 | 3–2 | 2–0 | 2–0 | | 0–1 | 1–0 | 0–0 | 0–0 | 1–0 | 2–1 | 2–1 | 3–0 | 1–1 | 4–0 | 3–3 |
| Partizan | 2–1 | 4–1 | 2–2 | 3–2 | 2–1 | 2–0 | 2–0 | | 1–0 | 1–1 | 1–1 | 2–0 | 3–0 | 4–1 | 2–1 | 2–0 | 3–1 | 4–0 |
| Priština | 1–0 | 1–0 | 3–2 | 0–0 | 1–0 | 1–1 | 1–0 | 1–0 | | 2–1 | 2–1 | 2–1 | 1–1 | 3–1 | 0–0 | 3–2 | 2–0 | 0–1 |
| Red Star | 3–1 | 4–1 | 0–1 | 2–0 | 4–0 | 2–1 | 1–0 | 2–1 | 2–0 | | 1–1 | 4–3 | 2–1 | 4–2 | 4–0 | 2–2 | 3–1 | 4–1 |
| Rijeka | 1–0 | 1–1 | 2–0 | 0–0 | 3–0 | 2–0 | 1–0 | 1–0 | 0–1 | 1–1 | | 2–0 | 3–0 | 3–1 | 2–0 | 3–3 | 3–0 | 0–0 |
| Sarajevo | 2–1 | 5–0 | 1–0 | 0–0 | 2–0 | 3–0 | 2–2 | 1–1 | 3–1 | 0–4 | 2–1 | | 1–0 | 3–1 | 3–0 | 0–0 | 0–0 | 2–1 |
| Sloboda Tuzla | 1–1 | 2–2 | 2–1 | 0–5 | 0–0 | 5–0 | 2–0 | 3–0 | 2–1 | 1–2 | 2–2 | 1–0 | | 3–1 | 2–2 | 2–1 | 3–1 | 3–2 |
| Sutjeska | 5–5 | 1–0 | 2–0 | 2–1 | 0–0 | 4–0 | 2–1 | 1–4 | 1–0 | 2–2 | 1–0 | 1–0 | 3–2 | | 2–0 | 5–1 | 1–0 | 4–1 |
| Vardar | 2–1 | 3–0 | 4–0 | 1–1 | 3–2 | 2–1 | 1–0 | 2–2 | 2–1 | 1–2 | 4–0 | 2–1 | 2–2 | 3–1 | | 1–5 | 2–0 | 4–2 |
| Velež | 2–0 | 4–1 | 4–1 | 3–1 | 2–2 | 2–3 | 1–0 | 0–0 | 3–0 | 0–2 | 1–1 | 1–1 | 2–0 | 1–0 | 4–0 | | 1–0 | 6–2 |
| Vojvodina | 1–0 | 1–1 | 1–1 | 1–7 | 1–3 | 3–4 | 1–1 | 0–4 | 3–2 | 4–1 | 0–0 | 1–0 | 2–1 | 0–1 | 2–1 | 1–1 | | 1–4 |
| Željezničar | 2–1 | 1–1 | 2–1 | 2–0 | 2–0 | 4–1 | 2–0 | 0–2 | 3–1 | 2–5 | 3–1 | 3–0 | 1–2 | 3–1 | 3–2 | 1–2 | 2–1 | |

Source: DataSoccer.it
Legend: Blue = home team win; Yellow = draw; Red = away team win.

== Winning squad ==
Champions: FK Partizan
| Player | League | |
| Player | Matches | Goals |
|---|---|---|
| (Socialist Federal Republic of Yugoslavia) Fahrudin Omerović (goalkeeper) | 34 | 0 |
| (Socialist Federal Republic of Yugoslavia) Zvonko Varga | 32 | 17 |
| (Socialist Federal Republic of Yugoslavia) Ljubomir Radanović | 32 | 4 |
| (Socialist Federal Republic of Yugoslavia) Vladimir Vermezović | 32 | 1 |
| (Socialist Federal Republic of Yugoslavia) Admir Smajić | 30 | 2 |
| (Socialist Federal Republic of Yugoslavia) Slobodan Rojević | 29 | 0 |
| (Socialist Federal Republic of Yugoslavia) Goran Stevanović | 28 | 3 |
| (Socialist Federal Republic of Yugoslavia) Nebojša Vučićević | 27 | 6 |
| (Socialist Federal Republic of Yugoslavia) Miloš Đelmaš | 26 | 11 |
| (Socialist Federal Republic of Yugoslavia) Zvonko Živković | 24 | 12 |
| (Socialist Federal Republic of Yugoslavia) Bajro Župić | 24 | 0 |
| (Socialist Federal Republic of Yugoslavia) Milonja Đukić | 23 | 1 |
| (Socialist Federal Republic of Yugoslavia) Vlado Čapljić | 21 | 3 |
| (Socialist Federal Republic of Yugoslavia) Radoslav Nikodijević | 17 | 0 |
| (Socialist Federal Republic of Yugoslavia) Miodrag Bajović | 15 | 0 |
| (Socialist Federal Republic of Yugoslavia) Miodrag Radović | 12 | 0 |
| (Socialist Federal Republic of Yugoslavia) Milinko Pantić | 9 | 2 |
| (Socialist Federal Republic of Yugoslavia) Milorad Bajović | 6 | 0 |
| (Socialist Federal Republic of Yugoslavia) Dragan Mance (Note: died 3 September 1985 in a car accident) | 5 | 2 |
| (Socialist Federal Republic of Yugoslavia) Goran Bogdanović | 5 | 0 |
| (Socialist Federal Republic of Yugoslavia) Jovica Kolb | 4 | 1 |
| (Socialist Federal Republic of Yugoslavia) Isa Sadriu | 4 | 0 |
Head coach: Nenad Bjeković

== Match-fixing controversy ==
As mentioned, week 34, the last week of 1985–86 Yugoslav First League season, featured some highly suspicious results. All the matches started at the same time on Sunday, 15 June 1986.

| Home team | Score | Away team | Notes |
|---|---|---|---|
| Partizan | 4–0^{†} | Željezničar | In order to become league champions, Partizan needed to beat Željezničar by at least the same margin that Red Star potentially beats Sarajevo by in their match. Since both matches were scheduled to start at the same time, Partizan came up with an impromptu pre-match ceremony for their famous striker Momčilo Vukotić who retired the previous year, meaning that their match versus Željezničar actually started 10 minutes later than Sarajevo-Red Star match. |
| Sarajevo | 0–4^{†} | Red Star | In order to become league champion, Red Star needed to beat Sarajevo by a larger margin than Partizan potentially beats Željezničar by in their match. Red Star ended up winning away by a four goal margin. |
| Vojvodina | 1–7^{†} | Dinamo Zagreb | Vojvodina was already mathematically relegated while Dinamo Zagreb needed to win, hopefully by a big margin, in order to have a chance at getting a third UEFA Cup spot through better goal difference. The game ended with a huge win for the visitors who scored 7 goals. |
| Hajduk Split | 5–3^{†} | Dinamo Vinkovci | Hajduk needed a win in their quest for the third UEFA Cup spot, while Dinamo Vinkovci's Davor Čop (former Hajduk's player) was in the middle of a scoring race and needed goals in order to become the league's top scorer. Hajduk won the game while Dinamo's Čop scored a hat-trick for the losing side. |
| Sutjeska | 5–5^{†} | Budućnost | Budućnost and Sutjeska both needed points to have a chance at avoiding relegation. The game ended in a high-scoring draw in which Sutjeska's player Miloš Bursać (Davor Čop's rival in Golden boot race) scored a hat-trick. |
| Čelik | 1–1^{†} | Rijeka | Rijeka needed points in their fight for the third UEFA Cup spot, while Čelik needed points to have chance at avoiding relegation. The game ended in a draw. |
| Osijek | 2–1 | Sloboda | |
| Velež | 2–3^{†} | OFK Belgrade | Velež already ensured a UEFA Cup spot, while OFK Belgrade needed a win to have a chance at avoiding relegation. The game ended with lowly visitors winning at the ground where even the top Yugoslav teams had trouble getting points all season long. |
| Priština | 0–0 | Vardar | |

^{†} results of matches suspected being fixed

== Top scorers ==
| Rank | Player | Club | Goals |
|---|---|---|---|
| 1 | (Socialist Federal Republic of Yugoslavia) Davor Čop | Dinamo Vinkovci | 22 |
| 2 | (Socialist Federal Republic of Yugoslavia) Miloš Bursać | Sutjeska | 20 |
| 3 | (Socialist Federal Republic of Yugoslavia) Zlatko Vujović | Hajduk Split | 18 |
| 4 | (Socialist Federal Republic of Yugoslavia) Zvonko Varga | Partizan | 17 |
| 5 | (Socialist Federal Republic of Yugoslavia) Predrag Jurić | Velež | 15 |
| 5 | (Socialist Federal Republic of Yugoslavia) Marinko Stojaković | OFK Beograd | 15 |
| 7 | (Socialist Federal Republic of Yugoslavia) Radmilo Mihajlović | Željezničar | 14 |
| 8 | (Socialist Federal Republic of Yugoslavia) Milko Đurovski | Red Star | 13 |
| 8 | (Socialist Federal Republic of Yugoslavia) Haris Škoro | Željezničar | 13 |
| 8 | (Socialist Federal Republic of Yugoslavia) Muhidin Teskeredžić | Sarajevo | 13 |
| 8 | (Socialist Federal Republic of Yugoslavia) Miroslav Ćurčić | Vojvodina | 13 |

== Attendance ==
| Club | Average home attendance | Average away attendance |
|---|---|---|
| Red Star Belgrade | 19,882 | 16,471 |
| FK Priština | 15,000 | 7,353 |
| FK Partizan | 13,765 | 16,059 |
| Čelik Zenica | 12,412 | 4,706 |
| Dinamo Zagreb | 12,353 | 12,647 |
| FK Vardar | 9,941 | 5,000 |
| FK Velež | 9,529 | 6,471 |
| Hajduk Split | 8,882 | 15,647 |
| FK Vojvodina | 7,294 | 6,059 |
| Budućnost Titograd | 6,059 | 6,412 |
| FK Željezničar | 5,941 | 11,882 |
| NK Rijeka | 5,588 | 6,412 |
| OFK Beograd | 5,529 | 6,118 |
| FK Sarajevo | 5,471 | 7,706 |
| Dinamo Vinkovci | 4,176 | 6,176 |
| NK Osijek | 4,000 | 5,706 |
| Sutjeska Nikšić | 3,882 | 5,647 |
| Sloboda Tuzla | 3,412 | 6,647 |

- Overall league attendance per match: 8,507 spectators

== See also ==
- 1985–86 Yugoslav Second League
- 1985–86 Yugoslav Cup
