= Fahrudin Omerović =

Bosnian footballer (born 1961)

Personal information
- Date of birth: 26 August 1961 (age 65)
- Place of birth: Doboj, PR Bosnia-Herzegovina, FPR Yugoslavia
- Height: 1.82 m (6 ft 0 in)
- Position: Goalkeeper

Senior career*
Years	Team	Apps	(Gls)
1980–1984	Sloboda Tuzla	94	(0)
1984–1992	Partizan	238	(0)
1992–1995	Kocaelispor	93	(0)
1996–1998	İstanbulspor	35	(0)
Total		460	(0)

International career
1989–1992	Yugoslavia	8	(0)
1996	Bosnia and Herzegovina	3	(0)

Managerial career
- 2005: İstanbulspor
- 2007–2008: Malatyaspor
- 2009–2010: İstanbulspor
- 2024: Konyaspor
- * Club domestic league appearances and goals

Fahrudin Omerović (born 26 August 1961) is a Bosnian football coach and former player who played as a goalkeeper. He most recently coached Süper Lig club Konyaspor.

In Turkey, Omerović became known as Fahrettin Ömerli while playing there; he took up Turkish citizenship as a naturalized citizen.

== Club career ==
Born in Doboj, SR Bosnia and Herzegovina, Omerović begin his career in FK Sloboda Tuzla, making his debut in the Yugoslav First League in the 1980–81 season. He spent four seasons playing in Tuzla, when in summer 1984 he was transferred to FK Partizan where he will become the main goalkeeper for the following eight seasons. With Partizan he won two Yugoslav championships, two Yugoslav Cups, and one Supercup.

After the dissolution of SFR Yugoslavia, he made a transfer to Kocaelispor in 1992. He played Kocaelispor for four years. After he moved to İstanbulspor and played there for 2 years. Finally he retired in 1998-99 season.

== International career ==
Omerović was capped eight times for Yugoslavia between 1989 and 1992, including a spot in Yugoslavia's 1990 World Cup roster where he spent the tournament as an unused backup to Tomislav Ivković. Even after the independence of Bosnia and Herzegovina, Omerović was included in the Yugoslav squad for Euro 1992, but the nation would be suspended due to the Yugoslav Wars.

In 1996, he played three matches for the newly established Bosnian national team. His final international was an October 1996 World Cup qualification match against Croatia.

== Coaching career ==
After retiring, he stayed in Turkey where he has undertaken a coaching career. Initially he worked as assistant of Safet Sušić and Aykut Kocaman, before beginning his career as a main coach working in clubs such as İstanbulspor, Malatyaspor and Ankaraspor.

== Managerial statistics ==
As of match played 6 May 2024

Managerial record by team and tenure
Team	Nat	From	To	Record							
Team	Nat	From	To	G	W	D	L	GF	GA	GD	Win %
İstanbulspor	(Turkey)	20 April 2005	30 June 2005	6	1	2	3	9	15	−6	16.67
Malatyaspor	(Turkey)	23 November 2007	30 June 2008	24	8	6	10	29	32	−3	33.33
Konyaspor	(Turkey)	15 January 2024	Present	18	6	6	6	18	19	−1	33.33
Total				48	15	14	19	56	66	−10	31.25

== Honours ==
- Yugoslav First League: 1985–86, 1986–87
- Yugoslav Cup: 1988–89, 1991–92
- Yugoslav Super Cup: 1989
