= Veselin Đurasović =

Bosnian footballer (born 1957)

Personal information
- Date of birth: 7 January 1957 (age 69)
- Place of birth: Mostar, FPR Yugoslavia
- Position: Defender

Senior career*
Years	Team	Apps	(Gls)
1974–1990	Velež Mostar	304	(2)

Managerial career
- –: Velež Mostar (assistant)
- 2010: Velež Mostar (caretaker manager)
- 2015–2017: Velež Mostar (Youth team)
- * Club domestic league appearances and goals

Veselin Đurasović (born 7 January 1957) is a Bosnian-Herzegovinian former football player, from the late 1970s and the 1980s and currently, football coach.

== Playing career ==
Born in Mostar, Đurasović played for Velež Mostar from 1974 to 1990. He played 17 seasons for Velež. Over 400 official games, out of that, 304 games in the Yugoslav First League. He is only one of four players that played over 300 games in the league, those being: Enver Marić, Franjo Vladić and Dušan Bajević. He was also the club captain in 26 games. He scored 2 goals for Velež in the league.

He debuted for the club on 8 October 1975 against Dinamo Zagreb in Mostar. He is one of the few who won both Yugoslav Cups, although he did not appear in the final in 1986 against Dinamo Zagreb because of an injury.

According to the estimates of the then famous Yugoslav magazine "Sport", he was named the best "number five". At that time, he played as a libero, and he was among the best on that position at that time.

Žarko Barbarić, former coach of Velež, had only words of praise for Đurasović: "A very grateful player. His rich experience and responsibility in the game are precious. Each coach and a team would want such a player and a man. A fighter without any flaw and fear. Where others wouldn't set a foot, he would a head", while former teammate, Predrag Jurić said: "Đurasović is a real man and a footballer. A big friend! Always ready to joke, but on the ground an example of how to fight for club and how to perform professional duties."

He played his last match for Velež on 16 May 1990 against Dinamo in Mostar, thus closing the circle of fate to debut against Dinamo and to finish his playing career against the Zagreb team.

Officially, the farewell was on the 1991 February tournament, in which Red Star Belgrade, Željezničar Sarajevo, and Dinamo Zagreb took part.

== Coaching career ==
One time, he was sitting on the Velež bench as an assistant to the head coach. In 2010 he was the caretaker manager of Velež. Most recently, he trained the youth team of Velež from 2015 to 2017.

He is currently serving as a representative of the club in the matches of the First League of the FBiH, as well as in the games of the youth selections.

== Honours ==
=== Player ===
Velež Mostar

- Yugoslav Cup: 1980–81, 1985–86
- Balkans Cup: 1980–81
