= Darko Belojević =

Serbian footballer

Personal information
- Date of birth: 14 December 1960 (age 65)
- Place of birth: Užička Požega, PR Serbia, FPR Yugoslavia
- Position: Goalkeeper

Senior career*
Years	Team	Apps	(Gls)
1980–1981	Sloboda Titovo Užice	15	(0)
1981–1989	Partizan	12	(0)
1983–1984	→ Olimpija Ljubljana (loan)	2	(0)
1986–1987	→ Priština (loan)	19	(0)
1989–1991	Adanaspor	55	(0)
Total		103	(0)
- * Club domestic league appearances and goals

Darko Belojević (Serbian Cyrillic: Дарко Белојевић; born 14 December 1960) is a Serbian former professional footballer who played as a goalkeeper.

== Playing career ==
After starting out at Sloboda Titovo Užice, Belojević joined Partizan in 1981. He spent eight seasons with the club, including loan spells at Olimpija Ljubljana (1983–84) and Priština (1986–87). In 1989, Belojević moved abroad to Turkey and played two seasons with Adanaspor. He subsequently returned to his homeland and briefly played for his hometown club Sloga Požega.

== Post-playing career ==
After hanging up his boots, Belojević served as a long-time goalkeeping coach at Partizan. He performed the same role for the national team of FR Yugoslavia in the early 2000s.

== Honours ==
Partizan

- Yugoslav First League: 1985–86
- Yugoslav Cup: 1988–89
