= Toni Anastasovski =

Macedonian footballer

Personal information
- Date of birth: 11 July 1969 (age 57)
- Place of birth: Štip, SFR Yugoslavia
- Position: Midfielder

Senior career*
| Years | Team | Apps | (Gls) |
| 1986–1989 | Vardar Skopje | 31 | (0) |
| 1989–1990 | Rad Beograd | 6 | (1) |
- * Club domestic league appearances and goals

Toni Anastasovski (Macedonian: Тони Анастасовски, born 11 July 1969) is a retired Macedonian football midfielder.

== Career ==
Born in Štip, SR Macedonia, he played in the Yugoslav First League with Macedonian side FK Vardar, between 1986 and 1989, and with Serbian side FK Rad in the 1989–90 season.
