= Bajro Župić =

Serbian footballer and manager

Personal information
- Full name: Bajram Župić
- Date of birth: January 21, 1960 (age 66)
- Place of birth: Novi Pazar, FPR Yugoslavia
- Height: 1.76 m (5 ft 9 in)
- Positions: Right back; centre back

Senior career*
| Years | Team | Apps | (Gls) |
| 1984–1985 | Novi Pazar | 28 | (3) |
| 1985–1990 | Partizan | 101 | (0) |
| 1990–1991 | Alpine Donawitz | 7 | (1) |
| Total | | 136 | (4) |
- * Club domestic league appearances and goals

Bajram "Bajro" Župić (Serbian Cyrillic: Бајрам Бајро Жупић; born January 21, 1960) is a former Serbian football player and a football manager.

== Career ==
He began his senior career with his hometown club, Novi Pazar, and after one season was invited to join Partizan Belgrade. Playing as a defender, he became a regular member of the team and was well regarded by the club’s supporters. During his career, he received one red card. He was also known for his approachable public persona, which led to several anecdotes circulating among supporters. His performances on the field inspired fan chants, including the phrase "Jedan je Bajro", meaning "Bajro, the one..." which remains associated with him.

In 1990, after having played 247 official matches for Partizan, he moved to Austrian club DSV Alpine where he played the 1990-91 season.

After retiring from playing, he has dedicated working with FK Novi Pazar at many levels.

He also runs a football school with his name in Novi Pazar, being Adem Ljajić his latest high-profile product. In 2023, Župić was elected as Novi Pazar's club president, succeeding Ismet Kurtanović.

== Honours ==
- Yugoslav First League: 2

1986, 1987

- Yugoslav Cup: 1

1989
