= Venceslav Simonovski =

Macedonian footballer

Personal information
- Full name: Venceslav Simonovski
- Date of birth: 29 September 1962 (age 64)
- Place of birth: Delčevo, SFR Yugoslavia
- Height: 1.75 m (5 ft 9 in)
- Position: Defender

Senior career*
Years	Team	Apps	(Gls)
1983–1988	Vardar Skopje	81	(0)
1989–1992	Spartak Subotica	81	(0)
- * Club domestic league appearances and goals

Venceslav Simonovski (Macedonian: Венцеслав Симоновски, born 29 September 1962) is a former Macedonian footballer.

== Club career ==
Born in Delčevo, SR Macedonia, back then within Yugoslavia, Simonovski played with Macedonian side FK Vardar in the Yugoslav First League between 1983 and 1988, and with Serbian side FK Spartak Subotica between 1988 and 1992.
