= 1988–89 Yugoslav Cup =

Football competition in SFR Yugoslavia

41st Marshal Tito Cup

Tournament details
- Country: Yugoslavia

Final positions
- Champions: Partizan (5th title)
- Runners-up: Velež

Tournament statistics
- Matches played: 45
- Goals scored: 108 (2.4 per match)

The 1988–89 Yugoslav Cup was the 41st season of the top football knockout competition in SFR Yugoslavia, the Yugoslav Cup (Serbo-Croatian: Kup Jugoslavije), also known as the "Marshal Tito Cup" (Kup Maršala Tita), since its establishment in 1946.

Partizan defeated Velež 6–1 in the final on 10 May 1989 to win the cup.

== Calendar ==
Round	Legs	Date	Fixtures	Clubs
First round proper (round of 32)	Single	3 August 1988	16	32 → 16
Second round proper (round of 16)	Double	17 August 1988	16	16 → 8
Quarter-finals	Double	30 November and 21 December 1988	8	8 → 4
Semi-finals	Double	8 and 23 March 1989	4	4 → 2
Final	Single	10 May 1989	1	2 → 1

== First round ==
In the following tables winning teams are marked in bold; teams from outside top level are marked in italic script.

Tie no	Home team	Score	Away team
1	Travnik	1–3	**Sarajevo**
2	**Dinamo Vinkovci**	1–0 (a.e.t.)	Čelik
3	Šibenik	1–0	Rad
4	Kabel	0–4	**Budućnost Titograd**
5	**Liria Prizren**	0–0 (5–4 p)	Hajduk Split
6	Lovćen	0–1	**Partizan**
7	Mladost Lučani	0–3	**Vojvodina**
8	Mladost Petrinja	3–5 (a.e.t.)	**Red Star**
9	**Napredak Kruševac**	3–1	Rijeka
10	Maribor	0–1	**Sloboda Tuzla**
11	Osijek	2–3 (a.e.t.)	**Mačva Šabac**
12	**Radnički Niš**	1–0	Spartak Subotica
13	**Rudar Ljubija**	1–0	Vardar
14	Sileks	0–3	**Velež**
15	Sutjeska Nikšić	0–0 (2–4 p)	**Dinamo Zagreb**
16	**Željezničar Sarajevo**	2–0	Prishtina

== Second round ==
Tie no	Team 1	Agg.	Team 2	1st leg	2nd leg
1	Dinamo Vinkovci	3–5	**Rudar Ljubija**	2–4	2–1
2	Sarajevo	1–2	**Vojvodina**	1–0	0–2
3	Šibenik	1–3	**Velež**	1–1	0–2
4	Napredak Kruševac	0–2	**Mačva Šabac**	0–0	0–2
5	**Partizan**	5–1	Budućnost Titograd	3–0	2–1
6	Radnički Niš	1–1 (1–3 p)	**Liria Prizren**	1–0	0–1
7	Sloboda Tuzla	2–6	**Red Star**	0–2	2–4
8	Željezničar Sarajevo	1–2	**Dinamo Zagreb**	1–1	0–1

== Quarter-finals ==
Tie no	Team 1	Agg.	Team 2	1st leg	2nd leg
1	**Mačva Šabac**	2–2 (a)	Dinamo Zagreb	1–0	1–2
2	**Partizan**	3–2	Red Star	2–1	1–1
3	**Rudar Ljubija**	2–1	Vojvodina	2–1	0–0
4	**Velež**	4–2	Liria Prizren	2–0	2–2

== Semi-finals ==
Tie no	Team 1	Agg.	Team 2	1st leg	2nd leg
1	**Partizan**	2–1	Mačva Šabac	2–1	0–0
2	**Velež**	1–1 (5–3 p)	Rudar Ljubija	1–0	0–1

== Final ==
10 May 1989

Partizan	6–1	Velež Mostar
Vučićević 30' (pen.), 34'; Milojević 52'; Vokrri 55'; Vermezović 58'; Batrović 79'		Repak 65'

JNA Stadium, Belgrade
Attendance: 35,000
Referee: Branko Bujić (Bar)

**Partizan**	**Velež**

PARTIZAN:
GK	**1**	(Socialist Federal Republic of Yugoslavia) Fahrudin Omerović (c)
DF	**2**	(Socialist Federal Republic of Yugoslavia) Borče Sredojević
DF	**3**	(Socialist Federal Republic of Yugoslavia) Miodrag Bajović
DF	**4**	(Socialist Federal Republic of Yugoslavia) Vladimir Vermezović
DF	**5**	(Socialist Federal Republic of Yugoslavia) Gordan Petrić
DF	**6**	(Socialist Federal Republic of Yugoslavia) Predrag Spasić
DF	**7**	(Socialist Federal Republic of Yugoslavia) Dragoljub Brnović
MF	**8**	(Socialist Federal Republic of Yugoslavia) Goran Milojević	(substituted off) 66'
FW	**9**	(Socialist Federal Republic of Yugoslavia) Slađan Šćepović
DF	**10**	(Socialist Federal Republic of Yugoslavia) Fadil Vokrri
MF	**11**	(Socialist Federal Republic of Yugoslavia) Nebojša Vučićević	(substituted off) 72'
Substitutes:
GK	?	(Socialist Federal Republic of Yugoslavia) Darko Belojević
MF	?	(Socialist Federal Republic of Yugoslavia) Jovica Kolb
MF	**14**	(Socialist Federal Republic of Yugoslavia) Bajro Župić	(substituted on) 66'
MF	**16**	(Socialist Federal Republic of Yugoslavia) Zoran Batrović	(substituted on) 72'
DF	?	(Socialist Federal Republic of Yugoslavia) Aleksandar Đorđević
Manager:
(Socialist Federal Republic of Yugoslavia) Momčilo Vukotić

VELEŽ:
GK	1	(Socialist Federal Republic of Yugoslavia) Vukašin Petranović
DF	2	(Socialist Federal Republic of Yugoslavia) Mili Hadžiabdić
DF	3	(Socialist Federal Republic of Yugoslavia) Ismet Šišić	(substituted off) 72'
DF	4	(Socialist Federal Republic of Yugoslavia) Ivica Barbarić
DF	5	(Socialist Federal Republic of Yugoslavia) Veselin Đurasović
DF	6	(Socialist Federal Republic of Yugoslavia) Ibrahim Rahimić
MF	7	(Socialist Federal Republic of Yugoslavia) Zijad Repak
MF	8	(Socialist Federal Republic of Yugoslavia) Zdenko Jedvaj	(substituted off) 69'
FW	9	(Socialist Federal Republic of Yugoslavia) Predrag Jurić
DF	10	(Socialist Federal Republic of Yugoslavia) Anel Karabeg
MF	11	(Socialist Federal Republic of Yugoslavia) Semir Tuce (c)
Substitutes:
MF	13	(Socialist Federal Republic of Yugoslavia) Ahmed Gosto	(substituted on) 72'
MF	15	(Socialist Federal Republic of Yugoslavia) Damir Čerkić	(substituted on) 69'
Manager:
(Socialist Federal Republic of Yugoslavia) Žarko Barbarić

== See also ==
- 1988–89 Yugoslav First League
- 1988–89 Yugoslav Second League
