= Vlado Čapljić =

Bosnian footballer (born 1962)

Personal information
- Date of birth: 22 March 1962 (age 64)
- Place of birth: Sarajevo, FPR Yugoslavia
- Height: 1.80 m (5 ft 11 in)
- Position: Defender

Youth career
- 1972–1979: Željezničar

Senior career*
Years	Team	Apps	(Gls)
1979–1985	Željezničar	80	(1)
1985–1987	Partizan	48	(4)
1988–1990	Dinamo Zagreb	40	(7)
1990–1992	Željezničar	2	(0)
1992–1994	Esposende		

International career
1979	Yugoslavia U19	3	(0)
1984	Yugoslavia U23		
1984–1985	Yugoslavia	4	(0)

Managerial career
- Radnički Obrenovac
- Bežanija (youth)
- Srem Jakovo
- Timočanin
- 2009–2011: Radnički Kragujevac
- 2012: Slavija Sarajevo
- 2013: Rudar Prijedor
- 2013–2014: Donji Srem
- 2014: Radnički Kragujevac
- 2015: Mačva Šabac
- 2015: Željezničar
- 2016: Vršac
- 2017: Radnički Kragujevac
Medal record
Men's Football
Representing Yugoslavia
Olympic Games
Bronze medal – third place	1984 Los Angeles	Team
- * Club domestic league appearances and goals

Vladan "Vlado" Čapljić (Serbian Cyrillic: Владан Владо Чапљић; born 22 March 1962) is a Bosnian professional football manager and former player.

== Playing career ==
=== Club ===
Čapljić started playing in the youth teams of hometown club Željezničar where he played until 1985. With them, he reached the semi-finals of the 1984–85 UEFA Cup.

Next, Čapljić moved to Belgrade to play with Partizan where he won two national championships, in 1986 and 1987. In January 1988, he moved to Dinamo Zagreb where he played until 1990.

Čapljić then returned briefly to Željezničar, before, in 1992, deciding to move abroad, to Portugal, where he played for lower league club Esposende, before hanging up his boots in 1994.

=== International ===
Čapljić played for all the youth selections, before making his senior debut for Yugoslavia in a March 1984 friendly match against Hungary and has earned a total of 4 caps, scoring no goals. He also played for the olympic team at the 1984 Summer Olympics and won a bronze medal.

His final international was a September 1985 FIFA World Cup qualification match against East Germany.

== Managerial career ==
After having retired, Čapljić decided to stay attached to football, and, after getting the coaching diploma, he started managing a number of teams in Serbia. He was also a manager of a few teams in Bosnia and Herzegovina. Čapljić was the manager of Radnički Obrenovac, Bežanija, Srem Jakovo, Timočanin, Radnički Kragujevac, Slavija Sarajevo, Rudar Prijedor, Donji Srem, Mačva Šabac, his former club Željezničar and Vršac.

Čapljić was most recently the manager for a third time in his career of Serbian First League club Radnički Kragujevac in 2017.

== Honours ==
Partizan

- Yugoslav First League: 1985–86, 1986–87

Yugoslavia

- Summer Olympics Third place: 1984
