= 1988–89 Yugoslav Second League =

Yugoslav Second League
- Season: 1988–89
- Champions: Olimpija Ljubljana
- Promoted: Olimpija Ljubljana; Borac Banja Luka
- Relegated: Radnički Kragujevac; Bačka; Novi Pazar; Belasica

The 1988–89 Yugoslav Second League season was the 43rd season of the Second Federal League (Serbo-Croatian: Druga savezna liga), the second level association football competition of SFR Yugoslavia, since its establishment in 1946.

== Teams ==
A total of twenty teams contested the league, including eight sides from the West and eight sides East Division from the 1987–88 season, two clubs relegated from the 1987–88 Yugoslav First League and two sides promoted from the Inter-Republic Leagues played in the 1987–88 season. The league was contested in a double round robin format, with each club playing every other club twice, for a total of 38 rounds. Two points were awarded for a win, while in case of a draw - penalty kicks were taken and the winner of the shootout was awarded one point while the loser got nothing. The 1988–89 season was the first to feature this tie-break system, and the Yugoslav FA's decision to implement this caused a lot of criticism and controversy. Apparently, the biggest proponent of the new system was FA president Slavko Šajber and the system was often derisively referred to in the media as 'Šajber's penalties'.

Prishtina and Sutjeska were relegated from the 1987–88 Yugoslav First League after finishing in the bottom two places of the league table. The two clubs promoted to the second level were Belasica and Bačka.

Locations of teams' home cities in the 1988–89 Yugoslav Second League

Team	Location	Federal subject	Position in 1987–88
Bačka BP	Bačka Palanka	(Socialist Republic of Serbia) SAP Vojvodina	—
Belasica	Strumica	SR Macedonia	—
OFK Belgrade	Belgrade	SR Serbia	2nd in YSL East
Borac Banja Luka	Banja Luka	SR Bosnia and Herzegovina	8th in YSL West
Borac Čačak	Čačak	SR Serbia	9th in YSL East
Dinamo Vinkovci	Vinkovci	SR Croatia	3rd in YSL West
GOŠK-Jug	Dubrovnik	SR Croatia	2nd in YSL West
Kikinda	Kikinda	(Socialist Republic of Serbia) SAP Vojvodina	4th in YSL West
Leotar	Trebinje	SR Bosnia and Herzegovina	7th in YSL West
Liria	Prizren	(Socialist Republic of Serbia) SAP Kosovo	5th in YSL East
Mačva Šabac	Šabac	SR Serbia	7th in YSL East
Novi Pazar	Novi Pazar	SR Serbia	6th in YSL East
Pelister	Bitola	SR Macedonia	3rd in YSL East
Prishtina	Pristina	(Socialist Republic of Serbia) SAP Kosovo	—
Olimpija	Ljubljana	SR Slovenia	12th in YSL West
Proleter Zrenjanin	Zrenjanin	(Socialist Republic of Serbia) SAP Vojvodina	6th in YSL West
Radnički Kragujevac	Kragujevac	SR Serbia	4th in YSL East
Sloboda Titovo Užice	Titovo Užice	SR Serbia	8th in YSL East
Sutjeska	Nikšić	SR Montenegro	—
Šibenik	Šibenik	SR Croatia	5th in YSL West

== League table ==
Pos	Team	Pld	W	PKW	PKL	L	GF	GA	GD	Pts	Promotion or relegation
1	Olimpija (C, P)	38	21	4	3	10	63	37	+26	46	Promotion to Yugoslav First League
2	Borac Banja Luka (P)	38	21	3	5	9	58	34	+24	45	Promotion to Yugoslav First League
3	Proleter Zrenjanin	38	18	7	3	10	68	42	+26	43	
4	Kikinda	38	19	4	3	12	61	45	+16	42	
5	Šibenik	38	19	4	2	13	57	45	+12	42	
6	OFK Belgrade	38	18	4	4	12	71	49	+22	40	
7	Borac Čačak	38	17	1	4	16	49	54	−5	35	
8	Sutjeska Nikšić	38	15	3	3	17	47	48	−1	33	
9	Liria	38	15	3	4	16	40	44	−4	33	
10	Prishtina (Note: Prishtina were docked 6 points due to match fixing in the last round of the previous season)	38	18	2	3	15	42	40	+2	32	
11	Mačva Šabac	38	12	8	2	16	37	47	−10	32	
12	Pelister	38	14	4	3	17	38	49	−11	32	
13	Sloboda Titovo Užice	38	14	4	1	19	37	48	−11	32	
14	Dinamo Vinkovci	38	13	5	7	13	49	43	+6	31	
15	Leotar	38	14	3	3	18	53	51	+2	31	
16	GOŠK-Jug	38	12	7	3	16	36	39	−3	31	
17	Radnički Kragujevac (R)	38	12	3	7	16	43	54	−11	27	Relegation to Inter-Republic Leagues
18	Bačka BP (R)	38	12	2	7	17	43	62	−19	26	Relegation to Inter-Republic Leagues
19	Novi Pazar (R)	38	11	3	5	19	32	48	−16	25	Relegation to Inter-Republic Leagues
20	Belasica (R)	38	11	0	2	25	34	76	−42	22	Relegation to Inter-Republic Leagues

Source: rsssf.org
Rules for classification: 1) points; 2) goal difference; 3) number of goals scored. If a match ended in a draw, penalties were taken, and only the winner of the penalty shoot-out was rewarded with a point.
(C) Champion; (P) Promoted; (R) Relegated

== See also ==
- 1988–89 Yugoslav First League
- 1988–89 Yugoslav Cup
