= Goran Bogdanović (footballer) =

Serbian footballer

Personal information
- Full name: Goran Bogdanović
- Date of birth: 27 April 1967 (age 59)
- Place of birth: Smederevo, SR Serbia, SFR Yugoslavia
- Height: 1.79 m (5 ft 10 in)
- Position: Midfielder

Youth career
- 1979–1985: Smederevo

Senior career*
Years	Team	Apps	(Gls)
1985–1993	Partizan	148	(14)
1993–1995	Mallorca	71	(7)
1995–1997	Espanyol	58	(6)
1998–1999	Extremadura	23	(0)
2000–2004	Sartid Smederevo	105	(7)
Total		405	(34)

International career
1989	Yugoslavia B	1	(0)
- * Club domestic league appearances and goals

Goran Bogdanović (Serbian Cyrillic: Горан Богдановић; born 27 April 1967) is a Serbian former professional footballer who played as a midfielder. He was noted for his technical ability and dribbling skills, especially his step-overs.

== Club career ==
After starting out at his hometown club Smederevo, Bogdanović was acquired by Partizan as a teenager in 1985. He would go on to win back-to-back championships with the Crno-beli in 1986 and 1987. After completing his compulsory military service in the 1988–89 season, Bogdanović established himself as one of the team's most regular players, helping Partizan win the only edition of the Yugoslav Super Cup (1989) and one Yugoslav Cup (1992).

In February 1993, Bogdanović moved abroad to Spain and signed with Segunda División side Mallorca. He spent two and a half years with the Bermellones, before transferring to La Liga side Espanyol in the summer of 1995. In his debut season with the Periquitos, Bogdanović scored five league goals in 24 appearances, as the club finished in fourth place. He later lost his place in the team, before switching to Extremadura in early 1998, helping them win promotion to the top flight.

In January 2000, Bogdanović returned to his parent club Sartid Smederevo. He helped the side to a fourth-place finish in the 2000–01 season, as the club qualified for European football for the first time in history and earned a spot in the UEFA Intertoto Cup. The following year, Bogdanović led the Oklopnici as captain to a highest-ever third-place finish to secure a spot in the UEFA Cup. He also helped them win the Serbia and Montenegro Cup in May 2003, clinching their first major trophy. At the end of the 2003–04 season, Bogdanović retired from professional football. He ended his career with a farewell exhibition game between his former clubs Smederevo and Partizan on 31 July 2004.

== International career ==
At international level, Bogdanović was capped once for Yugoslavia B in a 2–1 loss to England B at The Den on 12 December 1989.

== Post-playing career ==
Just weeks after hanging up his boots, Bogdanović was appointed as sporting director at his parent club Smederevo. He remained in charge until August 2012, before leaving the club following a disagreement with the newly appointed board.

== Career statistics ==
Appearances and goals by club, season and competition
Club	Season	League			Cup		Continental		Total	
Club	Season	Division	Apps	Goals	Apps	Goals	Apps	Goals	Apps	Goals
Partizan	1985–86	Yugoslav First League	5	0	0	0	0	0	5	0
Partizan	1986–87	Yugoslav First League	19	1	0	0	2	0	21	1
Partizan	1987–88	Yugoslav First League	17	0	1	0	0	0	18	0
Partizan	1988–89	Yugoslav First League	0	0	0	0	0	0	0	0
Partizan	1989–90	Yugoslav First League	30	3	6	0	6	0	42	3
Partizan	1990–91	Yugoslav First League	32	4	3	0	6	0	41	4
Partizan	1991–92	Yugoslav First League	27	3	8	3	2	0	37	6
Partizan	1992–93	First League of FR Yugoslavia	18	3	5	0	—		23	3
Partizan	Total		148	14	23	3	16	0	187	17
Mallorca	1992–93	Segunda División	13	0	1	0	—		14	0
Mallorca	1993–94	Segunda División	34	7	2	0	—		36	7
Mallorca	1994–95	Segunda División	24	0	8	1	—		32	1
Mallorca	Total		71	7	11	1	—		82	8
Espanyol	1995–96	Primera División	24	5	9	0	—		33	5
Espanyol	1996–97	Primera División	34	1	4	0	3	0	41	1
Espanyol	1997–98	Primera División	0	0	2	0	—		2	0
Espanyol	Total		58	6	15	0	3	0	76	6
Extremadura	1997–98	Segunda División	16	0	3	0	—		19	0
Extremadura	1998–99	Primera División	7	0	1	0	—		8	0
Extremadura	Total		23	0	4	0	—		27	0
Sartid Smederevo	1999–2000	First League of FR Yugoslavia	20	1	0	0	—		20	1
Sartid Smederevo	2000–01	First League of FR Yugoslavia	23	0	2	0	—		25	0
Sartid Smederevo	2001–02	First League of FR Yugoslavia	28	4			4	1	32	5
Sartid Smederevo	2002–03	First League of Serbia and Montenegro	17	2	3	0	3	0	23	2
Sartid Smederevo	2003–04	First League of Serbia and Montenegro	17	0			3	0	20	0
Sartid Smederevo	Total		105	7	5	0	10	1	120	8
Career total			405	34	58	4	29	1	492	39

== Honours ==
Partizan

- Yugoslav First League: 1985–86, 1986–87
- Yugoslav Cup: 1991–92
- Yugoslav Super Cup: 1989

Sartid Smederevo

- Serbia and Montenegro Cup: 2002–03
