= Miloš Đelmaš =

Serbian footballer

Personal information
- Date of birth: 4 June 1960 (age 66)
- Place of birth: Belgrade, FPR Yugoslavia
- Height: 1.80 m (5 ft 11 in)
- Position: Midfielder

Senior career*
Years	Team	Apps	(Gls)
1978–1987	Partizan	138	(20)
1987–1990	Nice	75	(3)
1991–1994	Hannover 96	44	(6)
Total		257	(29)

International career
1987	Yugoslavia	1	(0)

Managerial career
- 1995: Hannover 96 (caretaker)
- * Club domestic league appearances and goals

Miloš Đelmaš (Serbian Cyrillic: Милош Ђелмаш, born 4 June 1960) is a Serbian retired professional footballer who played as a midfielder.

Đelmaš earned his only cap for Yugoslavia in a September 1987 friendly match away against Italy, coming on as a 62nd-minute substitute for Semir Tuce.

== Personal life ==
His cousin is rock musician Raša Đelmaš.

== Honours ==
Partizan

- Yugoslav First League: 1982–83, 1985–86, 1986–87

Hannover 96

- DFB-Pokal: 1992
