= Goran Stevanović =

Serbian footballer and manager

Personal information
- Date of birth: 27 November 1966 (age 59)
- Place of birth: Sremska Mitrovica, SFR Yugoslavia
- Height: 1.82 m (6 ft 0 in)
- Position: Midfielder

Youth career
- 1975–1983: Partizan

Senior career*
Years	Team	Apps	(Gls)
1983–1991	Partizan	151	(21)
1991–1993	Osasuna	30	(0)
1993–1994	Farense	28	(4)
1994–1996	Vitória Setúbal	28	(3)
1996	Campomaiorense	18	(3)
1996–1997	União da Madeira	30	(3)
1997–1999	Veria	28	(2)
1999	Panelefsiniakos	6	(0)
Total		319	(36)

International career
1985	Yugoslavia	1	(0)

Managerial career
- 2001: Čukarički
- 2001–2002: Železnik
- 2003–2006: Serbia and Montenegro (assistant)
- 2007–2009: Partizan (assistant)
- 2009–2010: Partizan
- 2011–2012: Ghana
- 2013: Veria
- 2013: Qingdao Jonoon
- 2015: Agrotikos Asteras
- 2018: Qingdao Jonoon
- 2020: Napredak Kruševac
- 2022–2023: Serbia U21
- 2024: Napredak Kruševac
- 2025–2026: Tajikistan
- * Club domestic league appearances and goals

Goran Stevanović (Serbian Cyrillic: Горан Стевановић, pronounced [ɡǒran steʋǎːnoʋitɕ]; born 27 November 1966) is a Serbian football manager and former player.

== Playing career ==
=== Club ===
He started his career in Partizan, a club where he passed all categories, from the pioneer youth side to the senior side. He played a total of 328 games and scored 79 goals. He won the league title with Partizan twice: in 1985–86 and 1986–87.

He played abroad in Spain in Portugal, playing for Osasuna (1991–1993), Farense (1993–1994), Vitória Setúbal (1994–1996), Campomaiorense (1996) and União da Madeira (1996–1997). For the last two seasons of his career (1997–1999), he played for Greek clubs Veria and Panelefsiniakos.

=== International ===
He played for the pioneer, U20, U21, Olympic and A national teams. The only match for the senior side of Yugoslavia was in October 1985 against Austria in Linz.

== Coaching career ==
Stevanović started his coaching career with the younger categories of Partizan, and then briefly coached Čukarički and Železnik.

In 2003, he became the first assistant to Serbia and Montenegro national team head coach Ilija Petković with whom he qualified for the 2006 FIFA World Cup.

He returned to Partizan as an assistant coach in January 2008, and on 7 September 2009, he was promoted to head coach after the departure of Slaviša Jokanović. In April 2010 however, after losing to Vojvodina in the semi-final of the 2009–10 Serbian Cup, he submitted his irrevocable resignation. As his biggest achievements on the bench of Partizan, Stevanović cited the victory with a player down in the derby match against Red Star Belgrade on 28 November 2009 and the 1–0 victory against Shakhtar Donetsk in the Europa League, with which Partizan ended a streak of twelve matches without a win in European competitions.

In January 2011, Stevanović was appointed as the new Ghana coach. On 19 March 2012, Stevanović was sacked as the Ghana coach.

On 6 June 2013, Stevanović was hired by Greek Super League side Veria. On 27 August 2013, Stevanović left his Veria position.

On 5 September 2013, Stevanović signed a one-year deal with Chinese side Qingdao Jonoon. He was sacked at the end of 2013 season after Qingdao Jonoon relegation to China League One.

On 25 November 2015, Stevanović signed a one-and-a-half-year deal with Greek Football League club Agrotikos Asteras.

On 25 December 2017, Stevanović signed with Chinese side Qingdao Jonoon.

== Personal life ==
His daughter is volleyball player Jovana Stevanović.

== Honours ==
Partizan

- Yugoslav First League: 1985–86, 1986–87
- Yugoslav Cup: 1988–89
- Yugoslav Super Cup: 1989
