= Zoran Batrović =

Montenegrin footballer (born 1958)

Personal information
- Date of birth: 4 February 1958 (age 68)
- Place of birth: Titograd, FPR Yugoslavia
- Height: 1.77 m (5 ft 10 in)
- Position: Striker

Senior career*
Years	Team	Apps	(Gls)
1977–1978	Sutjeska Nikšić	2	(0)
1978–1979	Jedinstvo Bijelo Polje	26	(5)
1979–1983	Budućnost Titograd	94	(14)
1983–1987	Priština	97	(36)
1988–1989	Partizan	38	(12)
1989–1990	Deportivo La Coruña	8	(0)
1990	Borac Banja Luka	8	(2)
1990–1991	Mogren	26	(7)
Total		299	(76)

International career
1984	Yugoslavia	1	(0)
- * Club domestic league appearances and goals

Zoran Batrović (Cyrillic: Зоран Батровић; born 4 February 1958) is a Yugoslav and Montenegrin retired footballer who played as a striker.

== International career ==
Batrović debuted for Yugoslavia in a September 1984 friendly match away against Scotland; it remained his only international appearance.

== Personal life ==
His son, Veljko, is also a footballer.

== Honours ==
Partizan

- Yugoslav Cup: 1988–89
