= Vlado Komšić =

Bosnia and Herzegovina /Yugoslav footballer

Personal information
- Full name: Vlado Komšić
- Date of birth: 11 October 1955 (age 71)
- Place of birth: Kiseljak, FPR Yugoslavia
- Position: Defender

Senior career*
Years	Team	Apps	(Gls)
1977–1989	Željezničar	252	(12)
1990	Čelik Zenica	17	(0)
- * Club domestic league appearances and goals

Vlado Komšić (born 11 October 1955) is a retired football defender who played for clubs in the Bosnia and Herzegovina.

== Club career ==
Nicknamed Tašo, Komšić joined Yugoslav Second League side Željezničar in 1977 and established himself in the side under Ivica Osim. He scored 14 goals in 310 official games for the club. He started as a leftback, but got his recognition as a seasoned center-half.
