= Dejan Joksimović =

Serbian footballer

Personal information
- Full name: Dejan Joksimović
- Date of birth: January 10, 1965 (age 61)
- Place of birth: Belgrade, SFR Yugoslavia
- Height: 1.85 m (6 ft 1 in)
- Position: Attacking midfielder

Senior career*
| Years | Team | Apps | (Gls) |
| 1985–1986 | Rad | 15 | (5) |
| 1986–1987 | OFK Beograd | 32 | (3) |
| 1987–1988 | Red Star Belgrade | 17 | (3) |
| 1988–1989 | Vojvodina | 23 | (5) |
| 1989–1990 | Partizan | 11 | (3) |
| 1990–1991 | Red Star Belgrade | 5 | (0) |
| 1991–1992 | Sparta Prague | 8 | (0) |
| 1992–1993 | Lugo | 6 | (0) |
| 1993–1994 | Heidelberg United | 4 | (0) |
- * Club domestic league appearances and goals

Dejan Joksimović (Serbian Cyrillic: Дејан Јоксимовић; born January 10, 1965) is a Serbian retired footballer and current players agent.

== Playing career ==
He won two Yugoslav championships in row with different clubs, Red Star and Vojvodina. After Yugoslavia, he also played in Spain, Australia and the Czechoslovakia. With Red Star he won national Championships in 1987/88 and 1990/91, with Vojvodina in 1988/89, and with Partizan he won the Yugoslav Supercup in 1989/90.

== Post playing ==
After retiring, he has started a career as players agent, representing, among others, the Serbia national team stars Aleksandar Kolarov, Miloš Krasić, Branislav Ivanović, and Milan Jovanović. He also started the international careers of Ivica Olic, Nemanja Vidic and Ognjen Koroman.

In 2008, he presided over the controversial move that sent talented 17-year-old Uroš Ćosić from Red Star to CSKA Moscow.
