= Miodrag Radović =

Yugoslav and Serbian footballer

Personal information
- Full name: Miodrag Radović
- Date of birth: 18 December 1957 (age 68)
- Place of birth: Odžaci, FPR Yugoslavia
- Position: Right-back

Youth career
- Partizan

Senior career*
Years	Team	Apps	(Gls)
1976–1987	Partizan	154	(4)
1986	→ Degerfors IF (loan)	24	(0)
1987–1991	Altay	99	(2)
Total		277	(6)

International career
1983–1984	Yugoslavia	2	(0)

Managerial career
- 2010: Drina Zvornik
- * Club domestic league appearances and goals

Miodrag Radović (Serbian Cyrillic: Миодраг Радовић; born 18 December 1957) is a former Yugoslav and Serbian footballer who played as a defender.

== Career ==
Radović spent the majority of his career at his parent club Partizan. He made 154 official appearances and scored four goals in the Yugoslav First League from 1976 to 1987. In 1986, Radović was loaned to Swedish side Degerfors IF. He also spent four seasons with Turkish club Altay, before retiring from the game in 1991.

At international level, Radović was capped twice for Yugoslavia between 1983 and 1984.

== Honours ==
Partizan

- Yugoslav First League: 1977–78, 1982–83, 1985–86
- Mitropa Cup: 1977–78
