= Miodrag Bajović =

Montenegrin football manager and player

Personal information
- Date of birth: 17 October 1959 (age 67)
- Place of birth: Nikšić, PR Montenegro, FPR Yugoslavia
- Position: Defender

Senior career*
Years	Team	Apps	(Gls)
1977–1981	Sutjeska Nikšić	38	(3)
1982	Mogren	7	(0)
1982–1984	Sutjeska Nikšić	63	(2)
1985–1990	Partizan	98	(3)
1990–1991	Sutjeska Nikšić	25	(0)
1991–1992	Mogren	28	(0)
Total		259	(8)

Managerial career
- 2004: Sutjeska Nikšić
- 2007: Mogren
- * Club domestic league appearances and goals

Miodrag Bajović (Serbian Cyrillic: Миодраг Бајовић; born 17 October 1959) is a Montenegrin former football manager and player.

== Playing career ==
Between 1985 and 1990, Bajović spent five seasons at Partizan, making 98 appearances and scoring three goals in the Yugoslav First League.

== Managerial career ==
After hanging up his boots, Bajović briefly served as manager at his former clubs Sutjeska Nikšić and Mogren.

== Personal life ==
Bajović is the older brother of fellow footballer Milorad Bajović.

== Honours ==
Partizan

- Yugoslav First League: 1985–86, 1986–87
- Yugoslav Cup: 1988–89
- Yugoslav Super Cup: 1989
