= Milorad Bajović =

Montenegrin football manager and player

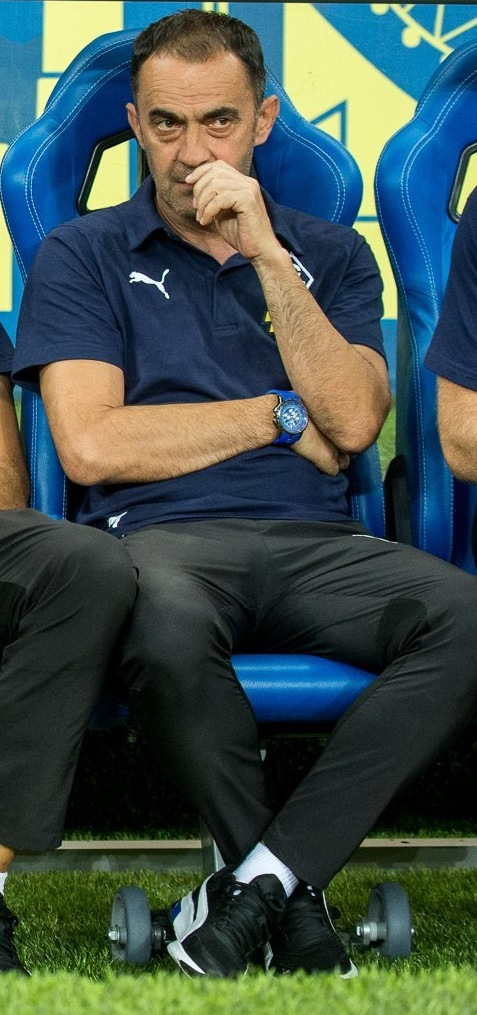
- Bajović with Krylia Sovetov in 2019

Personal information
- Date of birth: 2 February 1964 (age 62)
- Place of birth: Nikšić, SR Montenegro, SFR Yugoslavia
- Position: Midfielder

Senior career*
Years	Team	Apps	(Gls)
1980–1985	Sutjeska Nikšić	103	(12)
1985	Partizan	6	(0)
1986	Budućnost Titograd	12	(3)
1986–1987	Sutjeska Nikšić	28	(6)
1987–1990	Partizan	30	(8)
1990–1991	OFK Beograd	2	(0)
1991	Mogren Budva	17	(10)
1991–1992	Vitória Setúbal	11	(1)
1993–1995	Sutjeska Nikšić	42	(13)
1995	Pelita Jaya		
1996–1997	Sutjeska Nikšić	23	(6)
1997–1999	Vrbas	43	(10)
Total		317+	(69+)

International career
1984	Yugoslavia U21	1	(0)

Managerial career
- 2012–2014: Rostov (assistant)
- 2014–2015: Lokomotiv Moscow (assistant)
- 2018–2020: Krylia Sovetov (assistant)
- * Club domestic league appearances and goals

Milorad Bajović (Serbian Cyrillic: Милорад Бајовић; born 2 February 1964) is a Montenegrin football manager and former player.

== Club career ==
After playing for his hometown club Sutjeska Nikšić in the Yugoslav Second League, Bajović moved to Yugoslav First League side Partizan in the summer of 1985. He later played for Budućnost Titograd, OFK Beograd, Mogren, Vitória Setúbal (Portugal), Pelita Jaya (Indonesia), and Vrbas.

== International career ==
At international level, Bajović was capped for the Yugoslavia national under-21 team, making one appearance in September 1984.

== Managerial career ==
After hanging up his boots, Bajović served as an assistant manager to Miodrag Božović at numerous clubs, including Rostov, Lokomotiv Moscow, and Krylia Sovetov.

== Personal life ==
Bajović is the younger brother of fellow footballer Miodrag Bajović.
