= Slađan Šćepović =

Serbian footballer and manager

Personal information
- Date of birth: December 5, 1965 (age 60)
- Place of birth: Priboj, SFR Yugoslavia
- Position: Forward

Senior career*
Years	Team	Apps	(Gls)
1984–1992	Partizan	122	(22)
1985–1986	→ Bor (loan)	15	(7)
1992–1996	Apollon Limassol	87	(41)
1996–1997	Mérida	15	(1)
Total		239	(71)

Managerial career
- Partizan (youth)
- * Club domestic league appearances and goals

Slađan Šćepović (Serbian Cyrillic: Слађан Шћеповић; born 5 December 1965) is a Serbian former football manager and player.

== Career ==
Born in Priboj, SR Serbia within SFR Yugoslavia, he played most of his career with FK Partizan in the Yugoslav First League between 1984 and 1992, with an exception of a short spell with FK Bor while still in his beginning of career. Within the club he soon became an important player despite the concurrence for the striker position, and the Yugoslav league in those days was considered to be one of the most competitive ones. He won one championship, two cups and one Supercup. He is specially remembered among Partizan fans for scoring the decisive goal in a tied match with Celtic that ended 6–6 on aggregate, with goals away advantage for Partizan, and made them advance into the 1/8 finals of the 1989 UEFA Cup Winners Cup.

In 1992, he moved to Cyprus where he played with then highly motivated Apollon Limassol for four seasons in the Cypriot First Division becoming immediately in his first season a league top scorer. Beside winning one championship and being league's top scorer, he also lost two Cypriot Cup finals, in 1993 and 1995.

In 1996, he moved to Spain and signed with CP Mérida having played with the club in their historical season when they were promoted for first time in history to the Spanish La Liga by winning the Segunda División, Spanish second league. However he left that summer and retired from active playing.

He played most of his career as forward or striker. In July 2013 the Spanish EFE news agency wrongly stated that Slađan was a goalkeeper, being rectified in Stefan Šćepović's website.

After retiring he has worked as coach of youth squads of FK Partizan.

== Honours ==
Partizan

- Yugoslav First League: 1986–87
- Yugoslav Cup: 1988–89, 1991–92
- Yugoslav Super Cup: 1989

Apollon Limassol

- Cypriot First Division: 1993–94

Mérida

- Segunda División: 1996–97

Individual

- Cypriot First Division top scorer: 1992–93 (25 goals)

== Personal life ==
Šćepović has two sons all of them footballers. His son, Marko followed the tradition of his father becoming a Partizan player and has played with them in the 2010–11 UEFA Champions League. His other son, a year older than Marko, Stefan has already been playing for the Serbian under-21 team and has played already in the Serbian SuperLiga with OFK Belgrade, in Italy and in Belgium. Curiously, all father and sons are forwards.
