= Vladislav Đukić =

Serbian footballer

Personal information
- Date of birth: 7 September 1962 (age 64)
- Place of birth: Vrnjačka Banja, FPR Yugoslavia
- Position: Forward

Youth career
- Goč Vrnjačka Banja

Senior career*
Years	Team	Apps	(Gls)
1980–1981	Sloga Kraljevo		
1981–1986	Napredak Kruševac	92	(35)
1986–1987	Priština	30	(11)
1987–1989	Partizan	35	(14)
1989–1990	Cesena	26	(2)
1990–1992	Partizan	20	(4)
1992–1993	Napredak Kruševac	11	(1)

International career
1988	Yugoslavia	2	(1)

Managerial career
- 2001: Napredak Kruševac
- 2002–2003: Napredak Kruševac
- 2008–2009: Radnički Niš
- * Club domestic league appearances and goals

Vladislav Đukić (Serbian Cyrillic: Владислав Ђукић; born 7 September 1962) is a Serbian football manager and former player. He played as a forward.

== International career ==
Đukić made his debut for Yugoslavia against West Germany in a friendly 1–1 draw on 4 June 1988. He played his next match two months later scoring the second goal against Switzerland. The friendly match finished 2-0 for Yugoslavia and was played on 24 August 1988.
