= Nebojša Vučićević =

Serbian football manager and player (1962–2022)

Personal information
- Date of birth: 29 June 1962
- Place of birth: Belgrade, PR Serbia, FPR Yugoslavia
- Date of death: 11 March 2022 (aged 59)
- Place of death: Belgrade, Serbia
- Height: 1.81 m (5 ft 11 in)
- Position: Attacking midfielder

Youth career
- Palilulac Beograd

Senior career*
Years	Team	Apps	(Gls)
1981–1984	OFK Beograd	44	(16)
1984–1989	Partizan	140	(27)
1989–1990	Metz	21	(2)
1990	Salamanca	8	(1)
1991	OFK Beograd	14	(5)
1991–1993	Daewoo Royals	38	(1)
1994	Evagoras Paphos	11	(1)
1994–1995	Mladost Umčari		
1996	Železničar Maribor		
1996–1997	Mura	22	(3)
1997	Korotan Prevalje	10	(1)
1998	Kansas City Attack (indoor)	8	(11)
Total		316	(68)

Managerial career
- 2001–2002: Dorćol
- 2002: Jedinstvo Brčko
- 2002–2003: Srem
- 2003: Radnički Kragujevac
- 2004–2005: Radnički Beograd
- 2005: Mladenovac
- 2006: Obilić
- 2006: Hajduk Kula
- 2007: Nafta Lendava
- 2008: Sloga Kraljevo
- 2008: Dorćol
- 2009: Timok
- 2009–2010: Nafta Lendava
- 2010: Srem
- 2011–2012: Hearts of Oak
- 2012–2013: OFK Beograd (youth)
- 2013: Novi Pazar
- 2014: Timok
- 2016–2017: Ethiopian Coffee
- 2017: Novi Pazar
- 2019: Smederevo 1924
- 2020: GSP Polet Dorćol
- 2021: TEK Sloga
- 2022: Dinamo Vranje
- * Club domestic league appearances and goals

Nebojša "Uške" Vučićević (Serbian Cyrillic: Небојша Ушке Вучићевић; 29 June 1962 – 11 March 2022) was a Serbian football manager and player.

== Playing career ==
Vučićević started out at OFK Beograd, before transferring to Partizan in 1984. He spent the next five seasons with the Crno-beli, making 140 league appearances and scoring 27 goals. Subsequently, Vučićević moved abroad and played for Metz and Salamanca. He also played professionally in South Korea, Cyprus, and Slovenia. In 1998, Vučićević briefly played indoor soccer in the United States.

== Managerial career ==
Vučićević began his managerial career at Dorćol, winning promotion to the Second League of FR Yugoslavia in 2002. He subsequently briefly served as manager of Bosnian club Jedinstvo Brčko. Between 2004 and 2006, Vučićević enjoyed successful stints with Radnički Beograd and Hajduk Kula in the First League of Serbia and Montenegro. He later worked abroad in Slovenia, Ghana, and Ethiopia.

== Personal life ==
Vučićević is the father of fellow footballer Vanja Vučićević.

== Death ==
Vučićević died of a heart attack during a pick-up game on 11 March 2022, aged 59.

== Honours ==
Partizan

- Yugoslav First League: 1985–86, 1986–87
- Yugoslav Cup: 1988–89
