= Predrag Jurić =

Footballer (born 1961)

Personal information
- Date of birth: 4 November 1961 (age 65)
- Place of birth: Čitluk, FPR Yugoslavia
- Position: Striker

Senior career*
Years	Team	Apps	(Gls)
1980–1981	Velež Mostar	3	(0)
1981–1983	GOŠK-Jug	43	(17)
1984–1985	Dinamo Zagreb	38	(2)
1985–1989	Velež Mostar	61	(22)
1989–1992	Real Burgos	42	(8)
1992–1994	Marbella	67	(12)
1994–1995	Mérida	23	(3)
1995–2001	Hrvatski Dragovoljac	130	(17)

International career
1986–1987	Yugoslavia	2	(0)

Managerial career
- –2001: Hrvatski Dragovoljac
- –2005: Međimurje
- 2005–2006: Zadar
- 2020-2021: Jarun
- * Club domestic league appearances and goals

Predrag Jurić (born 4 November 1961) is a Bosnia and Herzegovina-born retired association footballer.

== International career ==
He made his debut for Yugoslavia in a November 1986 European Championship qualification match away against England and has earned a total of 2 caps, scoring no goals. His second and final international was a December 1987 European Championship qualification match against Turkey.

== Managerial career ==
In May 2001, Jurić was dismissed as manager by Hrvatski Dragovoljac and he was replaced by Miljenko Dovečer as manager of Međimurje in March 2005 After 15 years without coaching, he took charge at Jarun Zagreb in summer 2020, but had to resign in March 2021 due to health issues. He was replaced at Jarun by Denis Bezer.
