= Yugoslav Super Cup =

- Founded: 1969
- Abolished: 1989
- Region: Yugoslavia
- Teams: 2
- Last champions: Partizan (1st title)
- Most championships: Red Star Belgrade (2 titles)

The Yugoslav Super Cup was an annual football match played between the title holders of the Yugoslav First League and Yugoslav Cup.

== Finals by year ==
=== Two-legged format ===
Year	Champion	Winner of	Runner-up	Winner of	Scores
1969	Red Star Belgrade	1968–69 Yugoslav First League	Dinamo Zagreb	1968–69 Yugoslav Cup	4–1, 2–1
1971	Red Star Belgrade	1970–71 Yugoslav Cup	Hajduk Split	1970–71 Yugoslav First League	1–0, 4–2

=== Single match format ===
Year	Champion	Winner of	Runner-up	Winner of	Score	Stadium
1989	Partizan	1988–89 Yugoslav Cup	Vojvodina	1988–89 Yugoslav First League	2–2 (5–4 pen.)	Vojvodina Stadium, Novi Sad
