= 2001–02 FK Partizan season =

Partizan
2001–02 season
- President: Ivan Ćurković
- Head coach: Ljubiša Tumbaković
- First League of FR Yugoslavia: Winners
- FR Yugoslavia Cup: Quarter-finals
- UEFA Cup: First round
- Top goalscorer: League: Zvonimir Vukić (14 goals); All: Zvonimir Vukić (17 goals)

The 2001–02 season was FK Partizan's 10th season in First League of FR Yugoslavia. This article shows player statistics and all matches (official and friendly) that the club played during the 2001–02 season.

== Players ==
=== Squad information ===
- (Federal Republic of Yugoslavia) Radovan Radaković
- (Federal Republic of Yugoslavia) Vuk Rašović
- (Federal Republic of Yugoslavia) Dragoljub Jeremić
- (Federal Republic of Yugoslavia) Igor Duljaj
- (Federal Republic of Yugoslavia) Dejan Ognjanović
- (North Macedonia) Milan Stojanoski
- (Federal Republic of Yugoslavia) Goran Trobok
- (Federal Republic of Yugoslavia) Andrija Delibašić
- (Federal Republic of Yugoslavia) Zvonimir Vukić
- (Federal Republic of Yugoslavia) Damir Čakar
- (Federal Republic of Yugoslavia) Miladin Bečanović
- (Federal Republic of Yugoslavia) Radiša Ilić
- (Bosnia and Herzegovina) Nenad Mišković
- (Federal Republic of Yugoslavia) Ivan Stanković
- (Federal Republic of Yugoslavia) Aleksandar Nedović
- (Federal Republic of Yugoslavia) Ivica Iliev
- (Federal Republic of Yugoslavia) Vladimir Ivić
- (Federal Republic of Yugoslavia) Ajazdin Nuhi
- (Federal Republic of Yugoslavia) Saša Ilić
- (Federal Republic of Yugoslavia) Dejan Rusmir
- (Federal Republic of Yugoslavia) Branko Savić
- (Bosnia and Herzegovina) Branimir Bajić
- (Federal Republic of Yugoslavia) Ljubiša Ranković
- (Federal Republic of Yugoslavia) Milan Milijaš
- (Federal Republic of Yugoslavia) Milivoje Ćirković
- (Federal Republic of Yugoslavia) Danko Lazović
- (Federal Republic of Yugoslavia) Đorđe Pantić

== Competitions ==
=== First League of FR Yugoslavia ===
==== League table ====
Pos	Team	Pld	W	D	L	GF	GA	GD	Pts	Qualification or relegation
1	Partizan (C)	34	25	6	3	85	33	+52	81	Qualification for Champions League second qualifying round
2	Red Star Belgrade	34	18	12	4	54	28	+26	66	Qualification for UEFA Cup qualifying round
3	Sartid	34	17	7	10	46	36	+10	58	Qualification for UEFA Cup qualifying round
4	Obilić	34	16	8	10	52	41	+11	56	Qualification for Intertoto Cup first round
5	Zeta	34	15	7	12	48	50	−2	52	

Source: RSSSF.org
Rules for classification: 1) points; 2) goal difference; 3) number of goals scored.
(C) Champions

18 August 2001 1	Radnički Kragujevac	2–2	Partizan	Kragujevac
			Vukić 19', 87'	Attendance: 12,000

26 August 2001 2	Mladost Apatin	1–3	Partizan	Apatin
			Delibašić 28', 65'; Čakar 90'	Attendance: 9,000

8 September 2001 3	Partizan	2–1	Mladost Lučani	Belgrade
	Ilić 43' (pen.); Delibašić 67'			Stadium: Stadion FK Partizan; Attendance: 1,000

15 September 2001 4	Hajduk Kula	2–3	Partizan	Kula
			Bajić 20'; Delibašić 50', 88'	Attendance: 4,000

23 September 2001 5	Partizan	3–0	Zemun	Belgrade
	Delibašić 2'; Vukić 50'; Ilić 80'			Stadium: Stadion FK Partizan; Attendance: 1,500

30 September 2001 6	Rudar Pljevlja	2–2	Partizan	Pljevlja
			Ilić 69'; Bečanović 85'	Attendance: 6,000

13 October 2001 7	Partizan	4–0	Zeta	Belgrade
	Ilić 20', 39'; Trobok 29'; Delibašić 54'			Stadium: Stadion FK Partizan; Attendance: 1,500

20 October 2001 8	Železnik	1–2	Partizan	Belgrade
			Ranković 28'; Delibašić 55'	Attendance: 3,000

27 October 2001 9	Partizan	3–2	Čukarički	Belgrade
	Duljaj 9'; Vukić 27'; Čakar 83' (pen.)			Stadium: Stadion FK Partizan; Attendance: 1,000

3 November 2001 10	Crvena zvezda	0–0	Partizan	Belgrade
				Stadium: Marakana; Attendance: 30,000

7 November 2001 11	Partizan	2–0	Rad	Belgrade
	Vukić 13'; Ilić 63'			Stadium: Stadion FK Partizan; Attendance: 1,000

10 November 2001 12	Sartid	0–1	Partizan	Smederevo
			Ilić 77'	Attendance: 7,000

16 November 2001 13	Partizan	1–2	Vojvodina	Belgrade
	Ivić 74'		Jovanović 10', 66'	Stadium: Stadion FK Partizan; Attendance: 1,000

24 November 2001 14	OFK Beograd	1–1	Partizan	Belgrade
			Lazović 50'	Attendance: 1,500

1 December 2001 15	Partizan	1–1	Zvezdara	Belgrade
	Ivić 53'			Stadium: Stadion FK Partizan; Attendance: 1,000

4 December 2001 16	Obilić	1–3	Partizan	Belgrade
			Bečanović 18', 49'; Ilić 56'	Attendance: 2,500

8 December 2001 17	Partizan	3–1	Sutjeska Nikšić	Belgrade
	Trobok 9', 19'; Lazović 82'			Stadium: Stadion FK Partizan; Attendance: 1,500

2 March 2002 18	Partizan	6–0	Radnički Kragujevac	Belgrade
	Stojanoski 14'; 29' (o.g.); Ilić 44'; Lazović 61'; Vukić 85', 88'			Stadium: Stadion FK Partizan; Attendance: 3,000

9 March 2002 19	Partizan	4–0	Mladost Apatin	Belgrade
	Lazović 9'; Ivić 28'; 44' (o.g.); Bečanović 62'			Stadium: Stadion FK Partizan; Attendance: 1,000

15 March 2002 20	Mladost Lučani	1–2	Partizan	Lučani
			Bečanović 32'; Ivić 65'	Attendance: 4,000

20 March 2002 21	Partizan	3–0	Hajduk Kula	Belgrade
	Trobok 21'; Ivić 50'; Ilić 90'			Stadium: Stadion FK Partizan; Attendance: 1,500

23 March 2002 22	Zemun	1–3	Partizan	Belgrade
			Lazović 40'; Ivić 41'; Vukić 86'	Attendance: 3,000

30 March 2002 23	Partizan	3–0	Rudar Pljevlja	Belgrade
	Lazović 36'; Mišković 50'; Ilić 67'			Stadium: Stadion FK Partizan; Attendance: 3,000

3 April 2002 24	Zeta	3–1	Partizan	Golubovci
	Čolaković 9'; Brnović 71'; Vojvoda 76'		Bečanović 90+2'	Attendance: 3,500

6 April 2002 25	Partizan	2–0	Železnik	Belgrade
	Vukić 7', 58'			Stadium: Stadion FK Partizan; Attendance: 2,000

13 April 2002 26	Čukarički	0–1	Partizan	Belgrade
			Čakar 90'	Attendance: 2,500

21 April 2002 27	Partizan	0–3	Crvena zvezda	Belgrade
			Vidić 44'; Bogavac 80'; Milovanović 90'	Stadium: Stadion FK Partizan; Attendance: 30,000

24 April 2002 28	Rad	2–3	Partizan	Belgrade
			Bečanović 26'; Iliev 82'; Vukić 89'	Attendance: 2,000

27 April 2002 29	Partizan	3–1	Sartid	Belgrade
	Mišković 24', 78'; Ivić 31'			Stadium: Stadion FK Partizan; Attendance: 3,000

4 May 2002 30	Vojvodina	0–2	Partizan	Novi Sad
			Čakar 19'; Ivić 40'	Attendance: 6,000

12 May 2002 31	Partizan	3–3	OFK Beograd	Belgrade
	Čakar 47'; Lazović 63'; Iliev 72'		Jokić 36'; Stanić 46'; Brđanin 77'	Stadium: Stadion FK Partizan; Attendance: 2,500; Referee: Dejan Delević

24 May 2002 32	Zvezdara	0–4	Partizan	Belgrade
			Ilić 45'; Vukić 55', 71'; Čakar 86'	Attendance: 500

1 June 2002 33	Partizan	2–1	Obilić	Belgrade
	Stojanoski 65'; Čakar 90'		Filipović 84' (pen.)	Stadium: Stadion FK Partizan; Attendance: 12,000

5 June 2002 34	Sutjeska Nikšić	1–7	Partizan	Nikšić
	Koprivica 52'		Čakar 4', 21'; Iliev 12'; Lazović 24', 86'; Vukić 30'; Delibašić 70'	Stadium: Stadion kraj Bistrice; Attendance: 6,000

=== FR Yugoslavia Cup ===
10 October 2001 First round	AIK Bačka Topola	0–3	Partizan	Bačka Topola
			Delibašić 28'; Iliev 69'; Vukić 86'	Attendance: 3,000

24 October 2001 Second round	Partizan	4–0	Rad	Belgrade
	Duljaj 23'; Vukić 38'; Ranković 47'; Iliev 78'			Stadium: Stadion FK Partizan; Attendance: 1,500

21 November 2001 Quarter-finals	Železnik	1–1 (4 – 3 p)	Partizan	Belgrade
	? 29'		Delibašić 30'	Attendance: 1,000

=== UEFA Cup ===
==== Qualifying round ====
9 August 2001 Qualifying round 1st leg	Santa Coloma (Andorra)	0–1	(Federal Republic of Yugoslavia) Partizan	Andorra la Vella, Andorra
20:30		Report	Čakar 7'	Stadium: Estadi Comunal d'Andorra la Vella; Attendance: 900; Referee: Sergo Kvaratskhelia (Georgia)

23 August 2001 Qualifying round 2nd leg	Partizan (Federal Republic of Yugoslavia)	7–1 (8–1 agg.)	(Andorra) Santa Coloma	Belgrade, FR Yugoslavia
19:30	Ivić 12', 60'; Delibašić 21'; Čakar 68' 88' (pen.); Vukić 79'; Iliev 90'	Report	Juli Fernández 38' (pen.)	Stadium: Stadion FK Partizan; Attendance: 10,000; Referee: Oleg Timofejev (Estonia)

==== First round ====
20 September 2001 First round 1st leg	Partizan (Federal Republic of Yugoslavia)	1–0	(Austria) Rapid Wien	Belgrade, FR Yugoslavia
18:00	Bajić 90'	Report		Stadium: Stadion FK Partizan; Attendance: 17,000; Referee: Georgios Kasnaferis (Greece)

27 September 2001 First round 2nd leg	Rapid Wien (Austria)	5–1 (5–2 agg.)	(Federal Republic of Yugoslavia) Partizan	Vienna, Austria
20:30	Wallner 11', 60'; Taument 33'; Wagner 65', 71'	Report	Wagner 57' (o.g.)	Stadium: Gerhard-Hanappi-Stadion; Attendance: 15,400; Referee: Pasquale Rodomonti (Italy)

== See also ==
- List of FK Partizan seasons
- Partizanopedia 2001-2002 (in Serbian)
