= 2003–04 FK Partizan season =

Partizan
2003–04 season
- President: Ivan Ćurković
- Head coach: Lothar Matthäus (until 13 December 2003); Vladimir Vermezović
- First League of Serbia and Montenegro: Runners-up
- Serbia and Montenegro Cup: Semi-finals
- UEFA Champions League: Group stage (4th)
- Top goalscorer: League: Delibašić (10 goals); All: Delibašić (15 goals)

The 2003–04 season was the 58th season in FK Partizan's existence. This article shows player statistics and all matches (official and friendly) that the club played during the 2003–04 season.

== Players ==
=== Squad information ===
Note: Flags indicate national team as defined under FIFA eligibility rules; some limited exceptions apply. Players may hold more than one non-FIFA nationality.

No.	Pos.	Nation	Player
1	GK	SCG	Radovan Radaković
2	DF	SCG	Milivoje Ćirković
3	DF	SCG	Dragoljub Jeremić
5	DF	SCG	Dejan Ognjanović
7	DF	MKD	Milan Stojanoski
8	FW	CMR	Pierre Boya
9	FW	SCG	Srđan Radonjić
10	MF	SCG	Ljubinko Drulović
11	MF	SCG	Damir Čakar
12	DF	SCG	Zoran Mirković
14	DF	SCG	Nenad Đorđević
15	DF	SCG	Nikola Malbaša
17	FW	SCG	Ivica Iliev
18	MF	SCG	Vladimir Ivić (captain)
23	FW	SCG	Bojan Brnović

No.	Pos.	Nation	Player
24	DF	SCG	Branko Savić
25	DF	BIH	Branimir Bajić
26	DF	POL	Tomasz Rząsa
27	GK	SCG	Đorđe Pantić
28	MF	SCG	Albert Nađ
29	MF	SCG	Aleksandar Nedović
30	GK	SCG	Ivica Kralj
32	MF	SCG	Miroslav Radović
33	MF	SCG	Simon Vukčević
34	FW	SCG	Nikola Grubješić
35	FW	SCG	Borko Veselinović
36	MF	SCG	Nebojša Marinković
38	DF	SCG	Nemanja Rnić
44	MF	SCG	Stefan Babović
45	MF	SCG	Nikola Drinčić

== Transfers ==
=== In ===
Date	Pos.	Name	From	Fee	Ref.
June 2003	GK	(Serbia and Montenegro) Ivica Kralj	Unattached	Free	
June 2003	DF	(Serbia and Montenegro) Milovan Milović	(Serbia and Montenegro) Javor Ivanjica	Undisclosed	
June 2003	FW	(Serbia and Montenegro) Dženan Radončić	(Serbia and Montenegro) Rudar Pljevlja	Undisclosed	
July 2003	DF	(Serbia and Montenegro) Nenad Đorđević	(Serbia and Montenegro) Obilić	Undisclosed	
July 2003	DF	(Poland) Tomasz Rząsa	(Netherlands) Feyenoord	Undisclosed	
July 2003	MF	(Serbia and Montenegro) Ljubinko Drulović	(Portugal) Benfica	Undisclosed	
July 2003	FW	(Serbia and Montenegro) Bojan Brnović	(Serbia and Montenegro) Zeta	Undisclosed	
November 2003	FW	(Cameroon) Pierre Boya	(Lebanon) Salam Zgharta	Undisclosed	
January 2004	FW	(Serbia and Montenegro) Srđan Radonjić	(Serbia and Montenegro) Sutjeska Nikšić	Undisclosed	
January 2004	DF	(Serbia and Montenegro) Zoran Mirković	Unattached	Free	

=== Out ===
Date	Pos.	Name	To	Fee	Ref.
June 2003	MF	(Serbia and Montenegro) Zvonimir Vukić	(Ukraine) Shakhtar Donetsk	Undisclosed	
July 2003	FW	(Serbia and Montenegro) Danko Lazović	(Netherlands) Feyenoord	Undisclosed	
January 2004	FW	(Serbia and Montenegro) Dženan Radončić	(South Korea) Incheon United	Undisclosed	
January 2004	FW	(Serbia and Montenegro) Andrija Delibašić	(Spain) Mallorca	Undisclosed	
February 2004	MF	(Serbia and Montenegro) Igor Duljaj	(Ukraine) Shakhtar Donetsk	Undisclosed	
February 2004	DF	(Nigeria) Taribo West	Unattached	Released	

=== Loan out ===
Date from	Date to	Pos.	Name	To	Ref.
January 2004	June 2004	MF	(Serbia and Montenegro) Ajazdin Nuhi	(Serbia and Montenegro) Sartid Smederevo	
January 2004	June 2004	DF	(Serbia and Montenegro) Milovan Milović	(Serbia and Montenegro) Obilić	
January 2004	June 2004	DF	(Serbia and Montenegro) Bojan Zavišić	(Serbia and Montenegro) Sutjeska Nikšić	
February 2004	June 2004	MF	(Serbia and Montenegro) Saša Ilić	(Spain) Celta Vigo	

== Friendlies ==
6 July 2003 Friendly	FC Klus Balsthal (Switzerland)	1–5	(Serbia and Montenegro) Partizan	Balsthal, Switzerland
			Malbaša 30'; Radončić 50'; Ivić 62', 75'; Delibašić 83'	Attendance: 1,000

8 July 2003 Friendly	Grasshoppers (Switzerland)	3–1	(Serbia and Montenegro) Partizan	Balsthal, Switzerland
			Milović 86'

12 July 2003 Friendly	Partizan (Serbia and Montenegro)	3–2	(Romania) Rapid București	Balsthal, Switzerland
	Radončić 7'; Čakar 10'; Ivić 54'			Attendance: 2,000

14 July 2003 Aqua Nova-Cup Semi-finals	Luzern (Switzerland)	3–4	(Serbia and Montenegro) Partizan	Kriens, Switzerland
			Delibašić 44'; Đorđević 53'; Ilić 78', 86'

16 July 2003 Aqua Nova-Cup Final	Dinamo Zagreb (Croatia)	2–0	(Serbia and Montenegro) Partizan	Kriens, Switzerland

19 July 2003 Friendly	Borussia Mönchengladbach (Germany)	1–0	(Serbia and Montenegro) Partizan	Winterthur, Switzerland

25 July 2003 Friendly	Iraklis (Greece)	1–2	(Serbia and Montenegro) Partizan	Thessaloniki, Greece
			Radončić 8'; Ilić 70'	Attendance: 2,500

5 September 2003 Friendly	Legia Warsaw (Poland)	1–0	(Serbia and Montenegro) Partizan	Warsaw, Poland
				Attendance: 7,000

28 January 2004 Friendly	Partizan (Serbia and Montenegro)	2–3	(Switzerland) FC Aarau	Dubai, United Arab Emirates
	Radonjić 19', 35'

2 February 2004 Friendly	Partizan (Serbia and Montenegro)	2–0	(Kazakhstan) Zhenis Astana	Dubai, United Arab Emirates
	Radonjić 23'; Stojanoski 68'

8 February 2004 Friendly	Partizan (Serbia and Montenegro)	2–1	(Russia) FC Oryol	Dubai, United Arab Emirates
	Radonjić 15'; Ivić 30' (pen.)

11 February 2004 Friendly	Oman	3–3	(Serbia and Montenegro) Partizan	Dubai, United Arab Emirates
			Ivić 55', 63', 87'	Attendance: 50

== Competitions ==
=== Overview ===
Competition	Record							
Competition	P	W	D	L	GF	GA	GD	Win %
SCG SuperLiga	30	19	6	5	48	20	+28	63.33
SCG Cup	4	3	0	1	11	4	+7	75.00
UEFA Champions League	10	1	5	4	7	12	−5	10.00
Total	44	23	11	10	66	36	+30	52.27

=== First League of Serbia and Montenegro ===
==== League table ====
Pos	Team	Pld	W	D	L	GF	GA	GD	Pts	Qualification or relegation
1	Red Star Belgrade (C)	30	23	5	2	59	13	+46	74	Qualification for Champions League second qualifying round
2	Partizan	30	19	6	5	48	20	+28	63	Qualification for UEFA Cup second qualifying round
3	Železnik	30	17	7	6	48	20	+28	58	Qualification for UEFA Cup second qualifying round
4	OFK Beograd	30	14	9	7	50	57	−7	51	Qualification for Intertoto Cup second round
5	Sartid	30	14	7	9	43	36	+7	49	Qualification for Intertoto Cup first round

Source: RSSSF.org
Rules for classification: 1) points; 2) goal difference; 3) number of goals scored.
(C) Champions

9 August 2003 1	Partizan	6–1	Borac Čačak	Belgrade
	Drulović 2', 78'; Čakar 21', 70'; Delibašić 62', 80'			Stadium: Partizan Stadium

23 August 2003 2	Obilić	2–1	Partizan	Belgrade
			Ilić 40'

31 August 2003 3	Partizan	6–2	Kom	Belgrade
	Ilić 2'; Delibašić 30'; Drulović; Čakar			Stadium: Partizan Stadium; Attendance: 7,000

12 September 2003 4	Partizan	3–2	OFK Beograd	Belgrade
	Đorđević 25'; Delibašić 27'; Čakar 90' (pen.)			Stadium: Partizan Stadium

20 September 2003 5	Sutjeska	0–1	Partizan	Nikšić
			Delibašić 28'

26 September 2003 6	Partizan	2–1	Vojvodina	Belgrade
	Delibašić 19'; Ilić 22'			Stadium: Partizan Stadium

5 October 2003 7	Sartid	2–1	Partizan	Smederevo
			Ilić 33' (pen.)

17 October 2003 8	Partizan	1–0	Napredak Kruševac	Belgrade
	Delibašić 57'			Stadium: Partizan Stadium

26 October 2003 9	Hajduk Kula	0–0	Partizan	Kula

31 October 2003 10	Partizan	3–0	Zeta	Belgrade
	Ilić 22'; Savić 58'; Iliev 88'			Stadium: Partizan Stadium

8 November 2003 11	Crvena zvezda	3–0	Partizan	Belgrade

21 November 2003 12	Partizan	3–1	Radnički Obrenovac	Belgrade
	Boya 9'; Drulović 32'; Ilić 33'			Stadium: Partizan Stadium

30 November 2003 13	Zemun	1–2	Partizan	Belgrade
			Delibašić 14'; Ivić 70'

6 December 2003 14	Partizan	3–1	Budućnost Banatski Dvor	Belgrade
	Boya 34'; Iliev 48'; Ćirković 78'			Stadium: Partizan Stadium

13 December 2003 15	Železnik	0–1	Partizan	Belgrade
			Delibašić 36'

22 February 2004 16	Borac Čačak	0–1	Partizan	Čačak
			Boya 67'

28 February 2004 17	Partizan	2–0	Obilić	Belgrade
	Ivić 55'; Pantić 77' (o.g.)			Stadium: Partizan Stadium

6 March 2004 18	Kom	0–0	Partizan	Podgorica

13 March 2004 19	OFK Beograd	1–1	Partizan	Belgrade
			Radonjić

17 March 2004 20	Partizan	3–0	Sutjeska	Belgrade
	Iliev 43'; Radović 45'; Grubješić (?)			Stadium: Partizan Stadium

21 March 2004 21	Vojvodina	0–0	Partizan	Novi Sad

3 April 2004 22	Partizan	1–0	Sartid	Belgrade
	Radović			Stadium: Partizan Stadium

7 April 2004 23	Napredak Kruševac	0–1	Partizan	Kruševac
			Rnić

10 April 2004 24	Partizan	1–0	Hajduk Kula	Belgrade
	Đorđević 45'			Stadium: Partizan Stadium

14 April 2004 25	Zeta	1–2	Partizan	Golubovci
			Ivić; Brnović

17 April 2004 26	Partizan	0–0	Crvena zvezda	Belgrade
				Stadium: Partizan Stadium

24 April 2004 27	Radnički Obrenovac	0–3	Partizan	Obrenovac
			Ivić 23'; Radonjić 70', 90'

2 May 2004 28	Partizan	0–0	Zemun	Belgrade
				Stadium: Partizan Stadium

8 May 2004 29	Budućnost Banatski Dvor	1–0	Partizan	Banatski Dvor

15 May 2004 30	Partizan	0–2	Železnik	Belgrade
				Stadium: Partizan Stadium

=== Serbia and Montenegro Cup ===
29 October 2003 First round	Partizan	4–1	Šumadija 1903	Belgrade
	Delibašić 21', 50'; Đorđević 30'; Brnović 83'			Stadium: Partizan Stadium

3 December 2003 Second round	Partizan	5–2	Čukarički	Belgrade
	Drulović 10'; Ivić 54' (pen.), 64'; Boya 56'; Malbaša 68'			Stadium: Partizan Stadium

24 March 2004 Quarter-finals	Javor	0–2	Partizan	Ivanjica
			Radović 1'; Radonjić 30'	Stadium: Ivanjica Stadium

21 April 2004 Semi-finals	Crvena zvezda	1–0	Partizan	Belgrade
16:30	Pantelić 14'			Stadium: Red Star Stadium; Attendance: 30,000; Referee: Dejan Delević

=== UEFA Champions League ===
==== Second qualifying round ====
30 July 2003 QR2	Partizan (Serbia and Montenegro)	1–1	(Sweden) Djurgården	Belgrade, Serbia and Montenegro
20:00	Ilić 59'	Report	Makondele 72'	Stadium: Stadion FK Partizan; Attendance: 25,000; Referee: Attila Hanacsek (Hungary)

6 August 2003 QR2	Djurgården (Sweden)	2–2 (3 – 3 a agg.)	(Serbia and Montenegro) Partizan	Solna, Sweden
20:45	Johansson 10'; Wowoah 77'	Report	Ilić 61'; Malbaša 66' (pen.)	Stadium: Råsunda Stadium; Attendance: 28,287; Referee: Yuri Baskakov (Russia)

==== Third qualifying round ====
13 August 2003 QR3	Partizan (Serbia and Montenegro)	0–1	(England) Newcastle United	Belgrade, Serbia and Montenegro
20:30		Report	Solano 39'	Stadium: Stadion FK Partizan; Attendance: 32,500; Referee: Vladimír Hriňák (Slovakia)

27 August 2003 QR3	Newcastle United (England)	0–1 (a.e.t.) (1 – 1 agg.) (3–4 p)	(Serbia and Montenegro) Partizan	Newcastle upon Tyne, England
20:45		Report	Iliev 50'	Stadium: St James' Park; Attendance: 37,293; Referee: Anders Frisk (Sweden)
	Penalties
	Shearer (penalty missed); Dyer (penalty missed); Woodgate (penalty missed); Amoebi (penalty scored); LuaLua (penalty scored); Jenas (penalty scored); Hughes (penalty missed)		(penalty missed) Malbaša; (penalty scored) Nadj; (penalty missed) Stojanoski; (penalty scored) Čakar; (penalty missed) Iliev; (penalty scored) Ilić; (penalty scored) Ćirković

==== Group F ====
Pos	Team	Pld	W	D	L	GF	GA	GD	Pts	Qualification	RMA	POR	MAR	PTZ
1	(Spain) Real Madrid	6	4	2	0	11	5	+6	14	Advance to knockout stage	—	1–1	4–2	1–0
2	(Portugal) Porto	6	3	2	1	9	8	+1	11	Advance to knockout stage	1–3	—	1–0	2–1
3	(France) Marseille	6	1	1	4	9	11	−2	4	Transfer to UEFA Cup	1–2	2–3	—	3–0
4	(Serbia and Montenegro) Partizan	6	0	3	3	3	8	−5	3		0–0	1–1	1–1	—

Source: RSSSF

16 September 2003 1	Partizan (Serbia and Montenegro)	1–1	(Portugal) Porto	Belgrade, Serbia and Montenegro
20:45	Delibašić 54'	Report MatchCentre	Costinha 22'	Stadium: Partizan Stadium; Attendance: 32,000; Referee: Michal Beneš (Czech Republic)

1 October 2003 2	Marseille (France)	3–0	(Serbia and Montenegro) Partizan	Marseille, France
20:45	Drogba 62', 68', 85'	Report MatchCentre		Stadium: Stade Vélodrome; Attendance: 55,000; Referee: Domenico Messina (Italy)

22 October 2003 3	Real Madrid (Spain)	1–0	(Serbia and Montenegro) Partizan	Madrid, Spain
20:45	Raúl 38'	Report MatchCentre		Stadium: Santiago Bernabéu Stadium; Attendance: 58,000; Referee: Massimo Busacca (Switzerland)

4 November 2003 4	Partizan (Serbia and Montenegro)	0–0	(Spain) Real Madrid	Belgrade, Serbia and Montenegro
20:45		Report MatchCentre		Stadium: Partizan Stadium; Attendance: 30,100; Referee: Cosimo Bolognino (Italy)

26 November 2003 5	Porto (Portugal)	2–1	(Serbia and Montenegro) Partizan	Porto, Portugal
20:45	McCarthy 25', 50'	Report MatchCentre	Delibašić 90+2'	Stadium: Estádio das Antas; Attendance: 23,000; Referee: Paul Allaerts (Belgium)

9 December 2003 6	Partizan (Serbia and Montenegro)	1–1	(France) Marseille	Belgrade, Serbia and Montenegro
20:45	Delibašić 80'	Report MatchCentre	Mido 61'	Stadium: Partizan Stadium; Attendance: 28,000; Referee: Manuel Mejuto González (Spain)

== See also ==
- List of FK Partizan seasons
