= Miladin Bečanović =

Montenegrin footballer

Personal information
- Full name: Miladin Bečanović
- Date of birth: 18 April 1973 (age 53)
- Place of birth: Nikšić, SFR Yugoslavia
- Height: 1.85 m (6 ft 1 in)
- Position: Striker

Senior career*
Years	Team	Apps	(Gls)
1991–1993	Sutjeska Nikšić	35	(17)
1993–1995	Iraklis	55	(15)
1995–1997	Lille	56	(14)
1997	Marseille	12	(0)
1997–2000	Le Havre	54	(12)
2000–2003	Partizan	47	(16)
2003–2004	Créteil-Lusitanos	13	(2)
2004	Sion	10	(4)
2004–2005	Panserraikos	10	(0)
- * Club domestic league appearances and goals

Miladin Bečanović (Cyrillic: Миладин Бечановић; born 18 April 1973) is a Montenegrin retired professional footballer who played as a striker.

== Club career ==
=== Lille ===
Bečanović joined French club Lille ahead of the 1995–96 season. In his second season with Lille, he was the team's top scorer, having scored 13 goals over the course of the season. However, Lille was still relegated to the French second division at the end of the season.

=== Partizan ===
After joining in 2000, Bečanović contributed to Partizan winning the league over two consecutive seasons in 2002 and 2003. Under coach Ljubiša Tumbaković, he shared a striker partnership with a friend from his own hometown, Andrija Delibašić. On 10 March 2001, he scored the goal in a 1–0 away win against Budućnost in front of an audience of 7,000 people. Four days later, he scored a brace against Radnički Kragujevac and was named player of the match after Partizan won 4–0. On 5 May 2001, he scored the first goal in a 3–4 away win against his former team, Sutjeska Nikšić. In addition to his first season at Partizan, he also contributed to the team's successful 2001 Yugoslav Cup campaign. He played in the final against Red Star Belgrade on 9 May 2001, which Partizan won 1–0 at Red Star's stadium.

On 7 December 2001 he scored a brace in a 3–1 win against Obilić, but suffered a broken nose after scoring the second goal.
