= Milan Stojanoski =

Macedonian football manager and player

Personal information
- Date of birth: 15 September 1973 (age 53)
- Place of birth: Stari Lec, SR Serbia, SFR Yugoslavia
- Height: 1.83 m (6 ft 0 in)
- Positions: Sweeper; striker

Senior career*
Years	Team	Apps	(Gls)
1993–1997	Proleter Zrenjanin	120	(41)
1997–2000	Partizan	50	(6)
2000–2001	Beitar Jerusalem	29	(0)
2001–2004	Partizan	48	(3)
2004–2005	APOEL	6	(0)
2005–2007	Pegah		
2007–2008	Shahrdari Bandar Abbas		
2008–2009	Banat Zrenjanin	18	(0)
2009	BASK		
2010	Lokomotiva Beograd		
2011	Kovačevac		
Total		271	(50)

International career
1996–2004	Macedonia	26	(1)

Managerial career
- 2011: Kovačevac
- 2012: Radnički Pirot
- 2013: Lokomotiva Beograd
- 2015: Dolina Padina
- 2023: Teleoptik
- 2024: IMT
- * Club domestic league appearances and goals

Milan Stojanoski (Macedonian: Милан Стојаноски; born 15 September 1973) is a Macedonian football manager and former player.

== Club career ==
Born in Stari Lec, a village near Plandište, Stojanoski started his professional career as a striker with Proleter Zrenjanin. He played four seasons for the club (1993–1997), making 120 appearances in the top flight and scoring 41 goals. In the summer of 1997, Stojanoski was transferred to Partizan. He stayed there over the next three seasons, winning one national championship (1999) and one national cup (1998).

In May 2000, Stojanoski moved to Israeli club Beitar Jerusalem, signing a three-year contract. He returned to Partizan after only one year, spending the following three seasons with the Crno-beli. In his second stint at the club, Stojanoski was a member of the team that won back-to-back championship titles in 2002 and 2003. He also made five appearances in the 2003–04 UEFA Champions League, mostly playing as a sweeper.

In June 2004, Stojanoski signed with Cypriot club APOEL, on a two-year deal. He won the Cypriot Super Cup shortly upon his arrival, but eventually left the club in January 2005. Subsequently, Stojanoski moved to Iran, spending the next three seasons with Pegah (2005–2007) and Shahrdari Bandar Abbas (2007–08).

In the summer of 2008, Stojanoski returned to Serbia and joined SuperLiga club Banat Zrenjanin. He failed to help them avoid relegation, as the team finished bottom of the table. Before retiring from his playing career, Stojanoski also spent some time with lower league clubs BASK, Lokomotiva Beograd, and Kovačevac.

== International career ==
Between 1996 and 2004, Stojanoski represented Macedonia at international level, making 26 appearances and scoring one goal.

== Managerial career ==
In the summer of 2011, Stojanoski started his managerial career by taking charge of his former club Kovačevac. He was appointed manager of Radnički Pirot in March 2012. However, Stojanoski left the club by mutual consent in October 2012, being replaced by Mile Tomić. He was also manager of Lokomotiva Beograd (2013) and Dolina Padina (2015).

== Career statistics ==
=== Club ===
Appearances and goals by club, season and competition
Club	Season	League			Cup		Continental		Total	
Club	Season	Division	Apps	Goals	Apps	Goals	Apps	Goals	Apps	Goals
Proleter Zrenjanin	1993–94	First League of FR Yugoslavia	24	4			—		24	4
Proleter Zrenjanin	1994–95	First League of FR Yugoslavia	34	14			—		34	14
Proleter Zrenjanin	1995–96	First League of FR Yugoslavia	33	13			—		33	13
Proleter Zrenjanin	1996–97	First League of FR Yugoslavia	29	10			—		29	10
Proleter Zrenjanin	Total		120	41			—		120	41
Partizan	1997–98	First League of FR Yugoslavia	10	1	2	0	1	0	13	1
Partizan	1998–99	First League of FR Yugoslavia	16	1	5	0	4	0	25	1
Partizan	1999–2000	First League of FR Yugoslavia	24	4	0	0	2	0	26	4
Partizan	Total		50	6	7	0	7	0	64	6
Beitar Jerusalem	2000–01	Israeli Premier League	29	0			4	0	33	0
Partizan	2001–02	First League of FR Yugoslavia	22	2	2	0	0	0	24	2
Partizan	2002–03	First League of Serbia and Montenegro	17	1	1	0	2	0	20	1
Partizan	2003–04	First League of Serbia and Montenegro	9	0	2	0	9	0	20	0
Partizan	Total		48	3	5	0	11	0	64	3
APOEL	2004–05	Cypriot First Division	6	0			2	0	8	0
Banat Zrenjanin	2008–09	Serbian SuperLiga	18	0			—		18	0
Career total			271	50	12	0	24	0	307	50

=== International ===
Appearances and goals by national team and year
National team	Year	Apps	Goals
Macedonia	1996	1	0
Macedonia	1997	1	0
Macedonia	1998	6	1
Macedonia	1999	4	0
Macedonia	2000	4	0
Macedonia	2001	0	0
Macedonia	2002	2	0
Macedonia	2003	3	0
Macedonia	2004	5	0
Total		26	1

== Honours ==
Partizan

- First League of FR Yugoslavia: 1998–99, 2001–02, 2002–03
- FR Yugoslavia Cup: 1997–98

APOEL

- Cypriot Super Cup: 2004
