= Damir Čakar =

Montenegrin footballer (born 1973)

Personal information
- Date of birth: 28 June 1973 (age 53)
- Place of birth: Pljevlja, SR Montenegro, SFR Yugoslavia
- Height: 1.91 m (6 ft 3 in)
- Positions: Attacking midfielder; striker

Youth career
- Rudar Pljevlja
- 1988–1991: Budućnost Titograd

Senior career*
Years	Team	Apps	(Gls)
1991–1992	Budućnost Titograd	2	(0)
1992–1993	Rudar Pljevlja	30	(17)
1993–1994	Borac Čačak	15	(11)
1995–1997	Partizan	73	(43)
1997–1999	Châteauroux	28	(3)
2000	Sartid Smederevo	7	(0)
2000–2001	Sutjeska Nikšić	23	(19)
2001–2005	Partizan	67	(20)
2005	→ Rudar Pljevlja (loan)	16	(6)
2005–2007	Rudar Pljevlja	61	(37)
2007–2008	Mogren	14	(0)
Total		336	(156)

International career
1995–2001	FR Yugoslavia	3	(0)

Managerial career
- 2022: Novi Pazar
- 2025: Bokelj
- 2026: Partizan
- * Club domestic league appearances and goals

Damir Čakar (Serbian Cyrillic: Дамир Чакар; born 28 June 1973) is a Montenegrin former professional footballer who played as either an attacking midfielder or a striker. He is known for his powerful shots and set pieces.

== Club career ==
Čakar started out at his local club Rudar Pljevlja, before joining Budućnost Titograd, aged 15. He made his senior debut for the side during the final 1991–92 edition of the Yugoslav First League. Afterwards, Čakar returned to Rudar Pljevlja for the 1992–93 Second League of FR Yugoslavia, helping them win promotion to the First League of FR Yugoslavia. He subsequently moved to Borac Čačak, spending the next year and a half at the club.

In the 1995 winter transfer window, Čakar was transferred to Partizan. He was the team's top scorer in 1995–96 and 1996–97, helping them win back-to-back championships. In the summer of 1997, Čakar was sold to French side Châteauroux. He scored three league goals in his debut season at the club, as they suffered relegation from the top flight. In the following 1998–99 campaign, Čakar appeared in just four league games, before eventually leaving Châteauroux.

After two years abroad, Čakar returned to FR Yugoslavia and joined ambitious Sartid Smederevo in early 2000. He however failed to make an impact there due to an injury, before terminating his contract by mutual agreement with the club's chairman. Subsequently, Čakar signed with Sutjeska Nikšić. He scored 19 league goals in 23 appearances in the 2000–01 First League of FR Yugoslavia, securing him a return to Partizan. Over the next two seasons, Čakar added two more championship titles to his collection. He also helped Partizan reach the UEFA Champions League group stage in the 2003–04 campaign. In February 2005, Čakar was loaned to his parent club Rudar Pljevlja.

In the summer of 2005, Čakar extended his contract with Rudar Pljevlja, helping the side win the Montenegrin Cup in its first edition. He subsequently moved to fellow Montenegrin First League club Mogren, winning his second national cup, before eventually retiring from the game.

== International career ==
At international level, Čakar earned three caps for FR Yugoslavia. He made his national team debut on 31 March 1995, coming on as a substitute for Dejan Stefanović in a 1–0 friendly win over Uruguay. Six years later, Čakar received a call-up to the squad for the 2001 Kirin Cup.

== Post-playing career ==
In October 2015, Čakar was hired as a scout by Partizan under newly appointed sporting director Ivica Iliev.

In October 2022, Čakar was appointed as manager of Serbian SuperLiga club Novi Pazar.

== Personal life ==
Born in Pljevlja, Čakar grew up in a footballing family. His father Rasim and uncle Safet both played for Rudar Pljevlja. They are considered among the greatest players in the club's history.

== Career statistics ==
=== Club ===
Appearances and goals by club, season and competition
Club	Season	League			Cup		Continental		Total	
Club	Season	Division	Apps	Goals	Apps	Goals	Apps	Goals	Apps	Goals
Budućnost Podgorica	1991–92	Yugoslav First League	2	0			—		2	0
Rudar Pljevlja	1992–93	Second League of FR Yugoslavia	30	17	1	1	—		31	18
Borac Čačak	1993–94	Second League of FR Yugoslavia					—			
Borac Čačak	1994–95	First League of FR Yugoslavia	15	11			—		15	11
Borac Čačak	Total		15	11			—		15	11
Partizan	1994–95	First League of FR Yugoslavia	12	7	0	0	—		12	7
Partizan	1995–96	First League of FR Yugoslavia	32	16	7	2	—		39	18
Partizan	1996–97	First League of FR Yugoslavia	29	20	1	0	4	0	34	20
Partizan	Total		73	43	8	2	4	0	85	45
Châteauroux	1997–98	French Division 1	24	3	1	0	—		25	3
Châteauroux	1998–99	French Division 2	4	0	0	0	—		4	0
Châteauroux	1999–2000	French Division 2	0	0	0	0	—		0	0
Châteauroux	Total		28	3	1	0	—		29	3
Sartid Smederevo	1999–2000	First League of FR Yugoslavia	7	0	0	0	—		7	0
Sutjeska Nikšić	2000–01	First League of FR Yugoslavia	23	19	1	0	—		24	19
Partizan	2001–02	First League of FR Yugoslavia	29	9	3	0	4	4	36	13
Partizan	2002–03	First League of Serbia and Montenegro	26	7	1	2	7	2	34	11
Partizan	2003–04	First League of Serbia and Montenegro	12	4	2	0	6	0	20	4
Partizan	2004–05	First League of Serbia and Montenegro	0	0	0	0	0	0	0	0
Partizan	Total		67	20	6	2	17	6	90	28
Career total			245	113	17	5	21	6	283	124

=== International ===
Appearances and goals by national team and year
National team	Year	Apps	Goals
FR Yugoslavia	1995	1	0
FR Yugoslavia	1996	0	0
FR Yugoslavia	1997	0	0
FR Yugoslavia	1998	0	0
FR Yugoslavia	1999	0	0
FR Yugoslavia	2000	0	0
FR Yugoslavia	2001	2	0
Total		3	0

== Managerial statistics ==
As of 9 March 2026

Managerial record by team and tenure
Team	Nat	From	To	Record				
Team	Nat	From	To	G	W	D	L	Win %
Novi Pazar	(Serbia)	15 October 2022	14 December 2022	5	1	3	1	20.00
Partizan	(Serbia)	23 February 2026	9 March 2026	2	0	0	2	0.00
Career totals				7	1	3	3	14.29

== Honours ==
Partizan

- First League of FR Yugoslavia: 1995–96, 1996–97, 2001–02, 2002–03

Rudar Pljevlja

- Montenegrin Cup: 2006–07

Mogren

- Montenegrin Cup: 2007–08

Individual

- Montenegrin First League top scorer: 2006–07
