= 2002–03 First League of Serbia and Montenegro =

First League of Serbia and Montenegro
- Season: 2002–03
- Champions: Partizan; 18th domestic title
- Relegated: Rad; Čukarički; Javor; Rudar; Mogren; Radnički Niš
- Champions League: Partizan
- UEFA Cup: Red Star; Sartid
- Intertoto Cup: OFK Beograd; Sutjeska
- Matches: 306
- Goals: 793 (2.59 per match)
- Top goalscorer: Zvonimir Vukić (22)

The 2002–03 First League of Serbia and Montenegro (in fall season First League of FR Yugoslavia) was the eleventh and last season as FR Yugoslavia and (after was the country renamed in February 2003) first season of the Serbia and Montenegro's top-level football league since its establishment. It was contested by 18 teams (14 from Serbia and 4 from Montenegro), and Partizan won the championship.

== Teams ==
Mladost Lučani, Zvezdara, Mladost Apatin and Radnički Kragujevac, were relegated to the Second League of Serbia and Montenegro.

The relegated teams were replaced by 2001–02 Second League of FR Yugoslavia champions, Radnički Obrenovac (North), Radnički Niš (East), Javor Ivanjica (West) and Mogren (South).

Location of teams in the 2002–03 First League

Club	City	Stadium	Capacity
Partizan	Belgrade	Partizan Stadium	32,710
Red Star	Belgrade	Red Star Stadium	55,538
Vojvodina	Novi Sad	Karađorđe Stadium	17,204
Zemun	Zemun, Belgrade	Zemun Stadium	10,000
Rad	Belgrade	Stadion Kralj Petar I	6,000
Hajduk Kula	Kula	Stadion Hajduk	6,000
Obilić	Belgrade	FK Obilić Stadium	4,500
Železnik	Belgrade	Železnik Stadium	8,000
OFK Beograd	Karaburma, Belgrade	Omladinski Stadium	20,000
Sartid	Smederevo	Smederevo City Stadium	17,200
Čukarički	Belgrade	Stadion Čukarički	7,000
Sutjeska	Nikšić	Gradski stadion (Nikšić)	10,800
Zeta	Golubovci	Stadion Trešnjica	7,000
Rudar Pljevlja	Pljevlja	Stadion pod Golubinjom	10,000
Radnički Obrenovac	Obrenovac	Stadion pored Kolubare	5,000
Radnički Niš	Niš	Čair Stadium	20,000
Javor	Ivanjica	Stadion Ivanjica	5,000
Mogren	Budva	Stadion Lugovi	4,000

== League table ==
Pos	Team	Pld	W	D	L	GF	GA	GD	Pts	Qualification or relegation
1	Partizan (C)	34	29	2	3	88	36	+52	89	Qualification for Champions League second qualifying round
2	Red Star Belgrade	34	21	7	6	68	26	+42	70	Qualification for UEFA Cup qualifying round (Note: Sartid qualified for 2003–04 UEFA Cup as winner of 2002–03 Serbia and Montenegro Cup.)
3	OFK Beograd	34	19	6	9	57	36	+21	63	Qualification for Intertoto Cup first round
4	Sutjeska	34	19	5	10	43	32	+11	62	Qualification for Intertoto Cup first round
5	Železnik	34	18	8	8	56	37	+19	62	
6	Vojvodina	34	17	5	12	48	36	+12	56	
7	Obilić	34	14	9	11	45	35	+10	51	
8	Zeta	34	15	6	13	51	43	+8	51	
9	Hajduk Kula	34	13	9	12	39	29	+10	48	
10	Zemun	34	13	8	13	42	39	+3	47	
11	Sartid	34	10	15	9	44	44	0	45	Qualification for UEFA Cup qualifying round
12	Radnički Obrenovac	34	11	11	12	35	41	−6	44	
13	Rad (R)	34	11	10	13	39	43	−4	43	Relegation to Second League of Serbia and Montenegro
14	Čukarički (R)	34	10	7	17	42	56	−14	37	Relegation to Second League of Serbia and Montenegro
15	Javor Ivanjica (R)	34	9	7	18	21	44	−23	34	Relegation to Second League of Serbia and Montenegro
16	Mogren (R)	34	5	6	23	33	76	−43	21	Relegation to Second League of Serbia and Montenegro
17	Rudar Pljevlja (R)	34	4	6	24	19	62	−43	18	Relegation to Second League of Serbia and Montenegro
18	Radnički Niš (R)	34	2	5	27	23	78	−55	11	Relegation to Second League of Serbia and Montenegro

Source: RSSSF.org
Rules for classification: 1) points; 2) goal difference; 3) number of goals scored.
(C) Champions; (R) Relegated

== Results ==
Home \ Away	ČUK	HAJ	JAV	MOG	OBI	OFK	PAR	RAD	RNI	ROB	RSB	RUD	SAR	SUT	VOJ	ŽEL	ZEM	ZET
Čukarički		1–0	1–0	2–2	2–2	2–3	1–2	0–1	3–0	1–2	2–1	0–1	2–2	2–1	0–0	1–0	4–3	2–0
Hajduk Kula	1–0		0–0	6–0	0–1	0–1	0–1	2–0	4–0	2–0	3–2	5–0	0–0	0–0	0–0	1–0	1–0	2–1
Javor Ivanjica	1–0	0–0		2–1	0–0	0–1	1–2	1–0	2–0	1–2	1–0	0–1	0–1	0–0	1–0	1–0	1–1	1–4
Mogren	3–1	1–1	2–1		0–2	0–3	0–1	1–1	3–0	0–1	1–4	2–0	1–2	0–0	2–3	0–0	0–1	3–6
Obilić	1–0	0–1	3–1	4–0		3–1	0–1	3–0	2–0	1–1	0–0	2–1	3–3	2–0	1–2	1–1	1–1	2–1
OFK Beograd	2–2	1–0	6–0	1–0	0–1		0–2	1–0	2–1	2–2	0–2	4–1	3–1	3–2	4–0	3–1	2–1	1–1
Partizan	6–2	5–1	3–0	4–1	1–0	3–2		2–1	5–2	4–2	2–2	4–0	3–2	1–0	4–0	3–1	2–1	3–1
Rad	0–3	1–1	2–0	4–0	0–1	2–2	1–0		1–1	2–2	0–2	1–0	1–0	1–2	2–0	5–4	1–1	0–0
Radnički Niš	1–2	1–3	0–2	3–4	1–0	0–1	0–4	1–1		0–1	0–0	1–1	3–3	1–2	0–3	0–2	0–2	3–1
Radnički Obrenovac	2–0	1–0	0–0	2–0	3–3	0–0	1–2	2–4	2–0		0–2	1–0	0–0	0–2	2–2	0–0	0–0	2–1
Red Star	2–0	3–0	1–0	4–1	5–1	2–1	2–0	2–0	3–0	1–0		5–1	1–1	3–0	1–0	1–1	3–0	5–1
Rudar Pljevlja	1–0	1–2	1–2	1–0	1–1	0–1	2–3	1–2	1–0	0–1	1–3		0–0	2–3	0–2	0–0	0–0	1–4
Sartid	2–2	0–0	0–0	2–2	2–0	0–3	2–4	4–1	3–1	3–1	0–0	1–0		1–1	0–1	0–2	3–0	0–0
Sutjeska	3–1	3–1	4–1	2–1	2–1	2–1	0–1	2–1	2–1	1–1	1–0	1–0	2–1		1–0	1–0	1–0	1–0
Vojvodina	3–0	1–0	1–0	3–0	0–2	2–0	4–5	0–0	3–0	2–0	0–2	4–0	5–1	1–0		1–1	1–0	1–0
Železnik	5–2	3–2	3–1	4–1	2–1	0–0	2–0	1–0	2–1	1–0	4–3	1–0	1–2	2–1	2–1		3–1	3–1
Zemun	1–0	1–0	3–0	3–1	1–0	1–2	1–1	1–3	5–0	1–0	1–1	2–0	1–1	1–0	2–1	1–3		3–1
Zeta	2–0	0–0	1–0	2–0	1–0	2–0	1–4	0–0	3–1	3–1	3–0	3–0	0–1	1–0	3–1	1–1	2–1	

Source: Soccerway
Legend: Blue = home team win; Yellow = draw; Red = away team win.

== Winning squad ==
Champions: Partizan Belgrade (Coach: (Federal Republic of Yugoslavia) Ljubiša Tumbaković (until December) and (Germany) Lothar Matthäus)

Players (appearances/goals)

- (Serbia and Montenegro) Radovan Radaković
- (Serbia and Montenegro) Milivoje Ćirković
- (Serbia and Montenegro) Dragoljub Jeremić
- (Serbia and Montenegro) Igor Duljaj
- (Serbia and Montenegro) Dejan Ognjanović
- (Bosnia and Herzegovina) Nenad Kutlačić
- (North Macedonia) Milan Stojanoski
- (Serbia and Montenegro) Goran Trobok
- (Serbia and Montenegro) Andrija Delibašić
- (Serbia and Montenegro) Zvonimir Vukić
- (Serbia and Montenegro) Damir Čakar
- (Serbia and Montenegro) Miladin Bečanović
- (Serbia and Montenegro) Radiša Ilić
- (Bosnia and Herzegovina) Nenad Mišković
- (Serbia and Montenegro) Ivan Stanković
- (Nigeria) Taribo West
- (Serbia and Montenegro) Ivica Iliev
- (Serbia and Montenegro) Vladimir Ivić
- (Serbia and Montenegro) Ajazdin Nuhi
- (Serbia and Montenegro) Dejan Živković
- (Serbia and Montenegro) Saša Ilić
- (Serbia and Montenegro) Dejan Rusmir
- (Serbia and Montenegro) Branko Savić
- (Bosnia and Herzegovina) Branimir Bajić
- (Serbia and Montenegro) Danko Lazović
- (Serbia and Montenegro) Albert Nađ
- (Serbia and Montenegro) Đorđe Pantić

== Top goalscorers ==
Rank	Player	Club	Goals
1	(Serbia and Montenegro) Zvonimir Vukić	Partizan	22
2	(Serbia and Montenegro) Mihajlo Pjanović	Red Star	21
3	(Serbia and Montenegro) Miljan Mrdaković	OFK Beograd	20
3	(Serbia and Montenegro) Bojan Brnović	Zeta	20
5	(Serbia and Montenegro) Zoran Đurašković	Železnik	15
5	(Serbia and Montenegro) Nenad Mirosavljević	Sartid	15
7	(Serbia and Montenegro) Ivica Iliev	Partizan	13
8	(Serbia and Montenegro) Andrija Delibašić	Partizan	13
9	(Serbia and Montenegro) Ivan Bošković	Sutjeska	11
9	(Serbia and Montenegro) Saša Ilić	Partizan	11
9	(Serbia and Montenegro) Danko Lazović	Partizan	11
9	(Serbia and Montenegro) Boban Stojanović	Radnički Obrenovac	11
