= Danko Lazović =

Serbian footballer (born 1983)

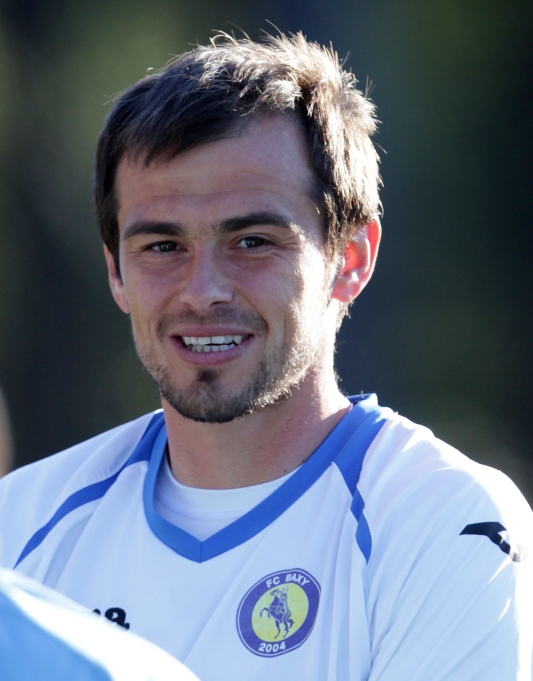
- Lazović with Beijing BG in 2015

Personal information
- Full name: Danko Lazović
- Date of birth: 17 May 1983 (age 43)
- Place of birth: Kragujevac, SR Serbia, SFR Yugoslavia
- Height: 1.84 m (6 ft 0 in)
- Position: Forward

Youth career
- 1996–2000: Partizan

Senior career*
Years	Team	Apps	(Gls)
2000–2003	Partizan	60	(20)
2000–2001	→ Teleoptik (loan)	23	(7)
2003–2006	Feyenoord	41	(9)
2005	→ Bayer Leverkusen (loan)	9	(0)
2006	→ Partizan (loan)	11	(5)
2006–2007	Vitesse	32	(19)
2007–2010	PSV	82	(24)
2010–2013	Zenit Saint Petersburg	51	(17)
2013	→ Rostov (loan)	9	(1)
2014–2015	Partizan	25	(15)
2015	Beijing Enterprises Group	28	(13)
2016	Olimpija Ljubljana	0	(0)
2016–2018	Videoton	61	(25)
Total		432	(155)

International career
2002–2014	Serbia (Note: Including 4 caps for Serbia and Montenegro (known as FR Yugoslavia until 2003))	47	(11)
Medal record
Men's football
Representing Serbia and Montenegro
UEFA European Under-21 Championship
Runner-up	2004 Germany
- * Club domestic league appearances and goals

Danko Lazović (Serbian Cyrillic: Данко Лазовић, pronounced [dâːŋko lâːzoʋitɕ]; born 17 May 1983) is a Serbian football administrator and former player who played as a forward. He represented the Serbia national team at the 2010 FIFA World Cup.

== Early and personal life ==
Danko Lazović was born on 17 May 1983 in Kragujevac, SR Serbia, SFR Yugoslavia, to an ethnic Serb father (Tomislav Lazović) and ethnic Serb mother (Gordana Lazović). His current second wife is the Hungarian fitness model Orsi Kocsis.

== Club career ==
=== Partizan ===
Lazović started playing football at a small football school in Kragujevac, before joining Partizan at the age of 13. In his first senior season, Lazović made eight league appearances for Partizan, and also played for Teleoptik on loan. Lazović made his European debut in the UEFA Cup qualifiers against Santa Coloma on 23 August 2001. He won the domestic title with Partizan twice in a row, in 2001–02 and 2002–03.

=== Feyenoord ===
After an impressive form at Partizan, Lazović would join Feyenoord in the summer of 2003 for a club record €7 million. On the opening of the season on 17 October 2003, he scored on his debut and the club's first goal of the season, in a 2–1 win over NEC and scored his first brace in his Feyenoord's career in a 3–2 win over Utrecht on 25 January 2004, bringing his 15 games without scoring. At the last game of the season, Lazović scored his first hat-trick in his Feyenoord's career, in a 7–1 win over relegated side PEC Zwolle. The next season, Lazović scored his first goal of the season and would score another, also setting up a goal for Dirk Kuyt in a 7–2 win over De Graafschap. At his time at the club, however, Lazović found it difficult to break into the first team squad at Feyenoord and moved onto Bayer Leverkusen in the summer of 2005 on a loan deal. After the move, Lazović said he expected to resurrect his career. In the first round of DFB-Pokal, Lazović scored a hat-trick on his competitive debut in an 8–0 win over Rot-Weiß Erfurt. However, he also failed to settle in at Bayer Leverkusen, returning to Partizan in January 2006 on a six-month loan deal. He had a decent half-season at his old club, scoring five league goals, but various reports continued about his apparent disruptive dressing room influence. In early May 2006, after the last league match of the season, Lazović was reportedly involved in a training ground bust up with teammate Niša Saveljić with bad blood even continuing later during lunch at the training facility.

=== Vitesse ===
Over the summer of 2006, Lazović returned to the Eredivisie, this time with Vitesse. Vitesse paid Feyenoord €1.5 million for the forward, with Feyenoord agreeing to pay the first year of his salary. On the opening game of the season, Lazović scored on his debut in a 2–1 win over Sparta Rotterdam (which he scored against them once again but a brace in a 3–0 win on 6 April 2006) and scored the following week (on 26 August 2006) in a 3–1 over AZ. Lazović scored his first hat-trick in the Dutch league in over two years in a 4–0 win over Heracles Almelo on 23 September 2006. He scored a goal and set up a goal for Anduele Pryor in a 2–2 draw but received a straight red card, just minutes before half-time, against Excelsior on 28 October 2006. Lazović was a member of the squad that beat Ajax 4–2, as he scored for himself and set up two goals for Mads Junker and Youssouf Hersi respectively. To the dismay of many Feyenoord fans, Lazović had an excellent season at Vitesse, rediscovering his scoring touch and being a serious contender for the league's golden boot for most of the season. He was also the club's top scorer.

=== PSV ===
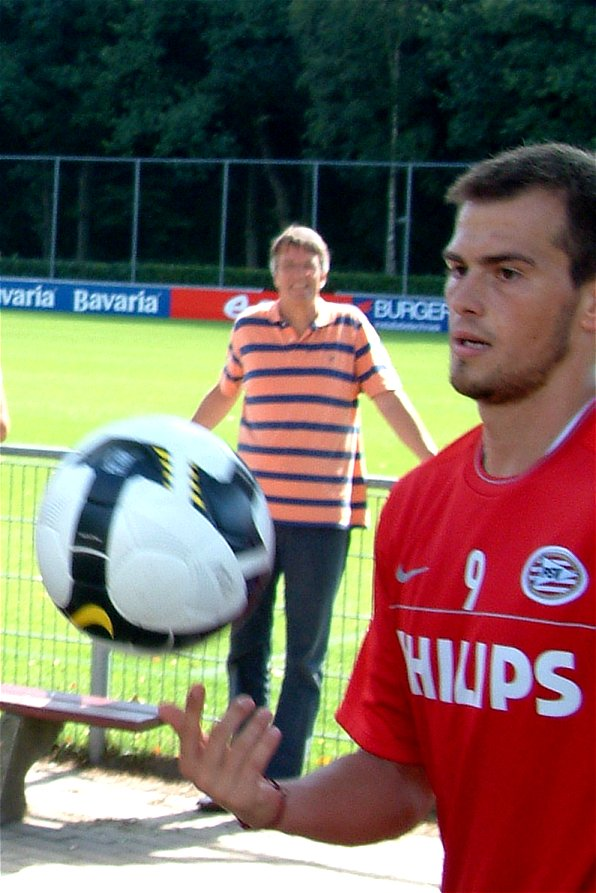
Lazović, in the shirt of PSV Eindhoven, twirling a ball

Lazović attracted the attention of PSV early on, before moving to them at the end of the season for €6.6 million, signing a five-year deal. He took over the number 9 jersey from legendary forward Patrick Kluivert, who was released and joined Lille. At PSV, Lazović earned the nickname "Lazoflap" due to his moderate appearance.

On the opening game of the season, Lazović scored twice on his debut in a 5–0 win over NEC. In the opening game of the UEFA Champions League group stage, he scored in a 2–1 win over CSKA Moscow. PSV's campaign in the Champions League went poor, resulting in the club going to the UEFA Cup. In the third round of UEFA Cup, he scored and set up a goal for Timmy Simons in a 2–0 win over Helsingborgs IF in the first leg. In the second leg, he scored again with the same result as in the first round. The club would progress in the UEFA Cup until meeting Italian side Fiorentina at the quarter final. At the end of the season, the club would win the title after scoring against his former club Vitesse in a 1–0 win.

The following season, Lazović scored his first two goals of the season as PSV would beat De Graafschap 3–0. In November 2008, he would be involved in a conflict with manager Huub Stevens. After setting up a goal for Ibrahim Afellay against Ajax, he appeared to allegedly insult Stevens, and after the match (which PSV lost 4–1) he was fined for showing dissent. Eventually, he would apologize and the two would bury the hatchet. On the last match of the Champions League group stage, he scored the club's only goal in the match as PSV lost 3–1 against Liverpool. Later in the season, however, the club could not win another title and surrendered it to AZ.

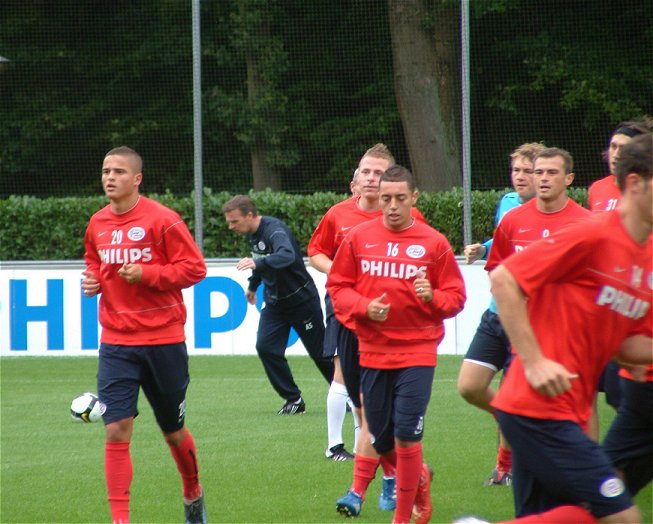
Lazović (second right) in training for PSV Eindhoven with teammates

The following season, he scored his first goal of the season in a 3–1 win over Willem II on 26 September 2009. On 11 November 2009, he earned a hat-trick and set up goals for Ola Toivonen (twice) and Otman Bakkal in a 5–1 win over ADO Den Haag. On 6 December 2009, he scored his last goal for the club in a 2–0 win over RKC Waalwijk, having previously scored against Sparta the previous week in a 3–2 win and ten days, he also scored his last competitive goal in a 2–0 win over CFR Cluj. He would make his last league appearance in a 1–1 draw against Sparta and also his last competitive appearance in the Europa League in a 3–2 win over Hamburger SV in the second leg, assisting a brace for Toivonen and Danny Koevermans. PSV, however, was eliminated in the Europa League on away goals.

=== Zenit Saint Petersburg ===
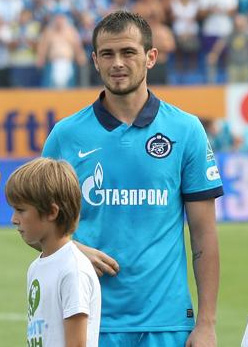
Lazović in the Zenit shirt ahead of a match

On 3 March 2010, Zenit Saint Petersburg completed the transfer of the striker from PSV for nearly €5 million. After the deal, PSV general director Jan Reker said, "Danko Lazović told us about the interest of Zenit about a week ago. We've since discussed his situation several times and have eventually decided to cash in on him."

Lazović made his Russian Premier League debut for Zenit on 13 March 2010 against Krylia Sovetov Samara, coming on as a substitute in the 54th minute for Konstantin Zyryanov. Two weeks later, Lazović made his first impact on the scoresheet, delivering a perfect ball to set up Danny for the first goal against Dynamo Moscow. His first goal, however, did not come until 9 July 2010 against Alania Vladikavkaz, as he helped Zenit to a 3–1 away victory.

On 30 September 2010, Lazović scored a double against AEK Athens in the Europa League at the Petrovsky Stadium. He scored from the penalty spot in the 43rd minute, beating AEK goalkeeper Giannis Arabatzis then added his second in the 57th minute, poking home a cross from Vladimir Bystrov. On 14 November 2010, he scored the Championship-winning goal against Rostov in the 40th minute, helping Zenit win its second Russian Premier League title in four years. Lazović finished the season with five goals in the Russian Premier League and seven in total. He tied with Georgi Peev of Amkar Perm for second-best assistant in the RPL with seven assists.

On 19 June 2011, during a 2–0 win over Volga, Lazović made headlines when he was tasered by the police with an electric baton after he tried to throw his shirt into the stands, that left a burn mark under his right shoulder blade. Television footage shows the Lazović (with no shirt) being approached by police officers as he moved towards the away fans after the match. Afterwards, he was quoted by Sport Express newspaper as saying, "I simply went to give my shirt to the fans after the game when a policeman appeared behind me and hit me in the back with an electric shock, I don't know why this happened. Maybe he thought I was one of the fans." Because of the police action, the club would make the accusation to the police, which they deny wrongdoing. Andrei Shmonin, deputy police chief of public security police in Nizhny Novgorod, says the police stepped between the players and the fans, with arms outstretched. In his hands was a stun gun, but it was not used. There was evidence by the medical commission, that Lazović did receive an electric shock from the police and also said the diagnosis that Lazović received was electrical accident and first-degree burns on the right subscapular region. Later in his Zenit's career, he was among three other player to be left out of the squad to the training camp in Zenit's first pre-season training camp. Also, Lazović first team opportunities would soon be limited due to goalscoring form striker Aleksandr Kerzhakov and several new signing, leading him to be placed in the reserves.

Upon his return to Zenit, Lazović continued to remain out of the first team spotlight, as he trains separate from the first team. He was linked with PAOK and Legia Warsaw In November 2013, Lazović announced he will leave the club at the end of the season.

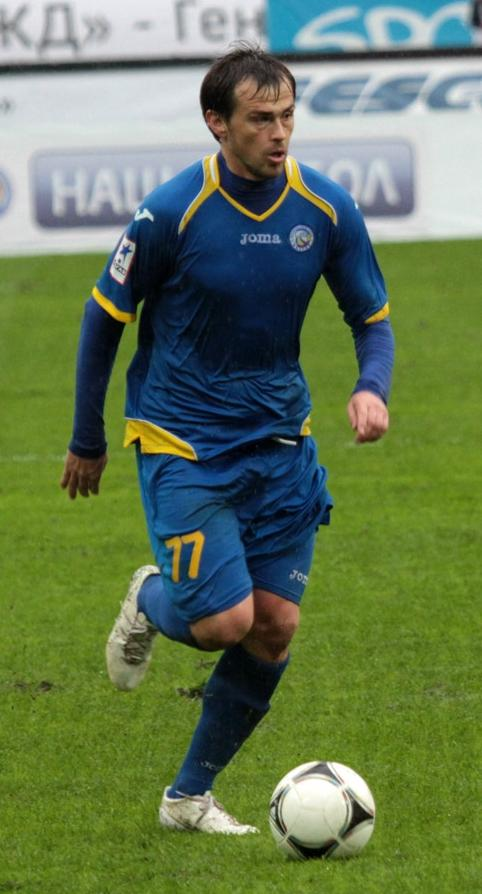
Lazović playing for Rostov in 2013

On 27 February 2013, just one day before the Russian transfer deadline, it was announced that he joined the Russian Premier League side Rostov on loan until the end of the 2012–13 season. In his first appearance of the 2012–13 season, he made his debut for Rostov, playing in the left wing, in a 0–0 draw against Alania Vladikavkaz. At the end of the season, Lazović returned to the club following a loan spell with Rostov.

=== Partizan ===
After leaving Zenit Saint Petersburg, Lazović returned to Serbia to rejoin Partizan on a free transfer, signing a two-year deal. On 8 March 2014, Lazović made his official re-debut for the club against his former club, Radnički Kragujevac, and scored a goal from the penalty spot in a 5–0 away win. During the 2013–14 season, Lazović played ten matches and scored six goals.

Lazović played his first match in the 2014–15 season against HB on 15 July 2014, in the second qualifying round of the 2014–15 UEFA Champions League, where he scored a brace and provided an assist in a 3–0 home win. On 31 August 2014, Lazović scored a brace in a 4–0 away league win over Rad. He has ended the first part of the season with 12 goals and 8 assists in 28 appearances in all competitions.

=== Beijing Enterprises Group ===
On 16 February 2015, Lazović transferred to China League One side Beijing Enterprises Group.

=== Olimpija Ljubljana ===
On 25 February 2016, Lazović transferred to Slovenian PrvaLiga side Olimpija Ljubljana. He left the club on 20 April 2016 without making a single appearance for the club, as he did not obtain a work permit.

=== Videoton ===
In June 2016, Lazović was signed by Hungarian club Videoton, playing in the Nemzeti Bajnokság I. While with the team, the veteran scorer played a key part in their in success as the runners-up for the 2016–17 Nemzeti Bajnokság I season and winning the 2017–18 Nemzeti Bajnokság I season as the team's leading scorer. At the beginning of the 2018–19 season he captained them to reach the group stage of the UEFA Europe League but retired before its start in September 2018.

== International career ==
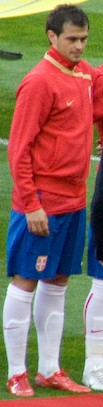
Lazović with the Serbia national team

Lazović made his international debut for the Yugoslavia national team on 27 March 2002, in a friendly match against Brazil in Fortaleza.

After the Serbia and Montenegro split, Lazović played for Serbia, and scored the first goal ever in international football for Serbia; an equalizer in their friendly against the Czech Republic on 16 August 2006 in Uherské Hradiště, which they went on to win 3–1.

In June 2010, he was selected in Serbia's squad for the 2010 FIFA World Cup, where he appeared in group stage matches against Germany and Australia.

In March 2011, two weeks before a crucial Euro 2012 qualifier against Northern Ireland, Lazović decided to retire from the national team at the age of 27, choosing to focus on his club Zenit. On the same occasion, his club colleague from Zenit Aleksandar Luković also made the same announcement.

== Post-playing career ==
In October 2024, Lazović was appointed as a member of FK Partizan temporary governing body.

== Career statistics ==
=== Club ===
Club	Season	League			Cup		Continental		Other		Total	
Club	Season	Division	Apps	Goals	Apps	Goals	Apps	Goals	Apps	Goals	Apps	Goals
Teleoptik (loan)	2000–01	Second League of FR Yugoslavia	23	7	—		—		—		23	7
Partizan	2000–01	First League of FR Yugoslavia	8	0	0	0	0	0	—		8	0
Partizan	2001–02	First League of FR Yugoslavia	26	9	0	0	1	0	—		27	9
Partizan	2002–03	First League of FR Yugoslavia	26	11	2	1	6	3	—		34	15
Partizan	Total		60	20	2	1	7	3	—		69	24
Feyenoord	2003–04	Eredivisie	23	6	1	0	2	0	—		26	6
Feyenoord	2004–05	Eredivisie	18	3	2	1	5	0	—		25	4
Feyenoord	Total		41	9	3	1	7	0	—		51	10
Bayer Leverkusen (loan)	2005–06	Bundesliga	9	0	1	3	1	0	—		11	3
Partizan (loan)	2005–06	Serbia and Montenegro SuperLiga	11	5	0	0	0	0	—		11	5
Vitesse	2006–07	Eredivisie	32	19	2	1	—		5 (Note: Appearances in Eredivisie play-offs)	2	39	22
PSV	2007–08	Eredivisie	31	11	0	0	12	3	0	0	43	14
PSV	2008–09	Eredivisie	27	8	2	2	3	1	1 (Note: Appearance in Johan Cruyff Shield)	1	33	12
PSV	2009–10	Eredivisie	24	5	3	1	11	1	0	0	38	7
PSV	Total		82	24	5	3	26	5	1	1	114	33
Zenit Saint Petersburg	2010	Russian Premier League	20	5	5	1	11	3	0	0	36	9
Zenit Saint Petersburg	2011–12	Russian Premier League	31	12	3	0	6	0	1 (Note: Appearance in Russian Super Cup)	0	41	12
Zenit Saint Petersburg	Total		51	17	8	1	17	3	1	0	77	21
Rostov (loan)	2012–13	Russian Premier League	9	1	2	0	—		2 (Note: Appearances in Russian relegation play-offs)	1	13	2
Partizan	2013–14	Serbian SuperLiga	10	6	0	0	0	0	—		10	6
Partizan	2014–15	Serbian SuperLiga	15	9	2	0	11	3	—		28	12
Partizan	Total		25	15	2	0	11	3	—		38	18
Beijing Enterprises Group	2015	China League One	28	13	3	2	—		—		31	15
Videoton	2016–17	NB I	30	10	0	0	1	0	—		31	10
Videoton	2017–18	NB I	25	14	3	0	8	2	—		36	16
Videoton	2018–19	NB I	6	1	0	0	7	2	—		13	3
Videoton	Total		61	25	3	0	16	4	—		80	29
Career total			432	155	31	12	85	18	9	4	557	189

=== International ===
Serbia
Year	Apps	Goals
2002	1	0
2003	0	0
2004	3	0
2005	0	0
2006	6	3
2007	8	2
2008	6	2
2009	9	3
2010	10	1
2011	0	0
2012	0	0
2013	0	0
2014	4	0
Total	47	11

#	Date	Venue	Opponent	Score	Result	Competition
1.	16 August 2006	Městský fotbalový stadion Miroslava Valenty, Uherské Hradiště, Czech Republic	Czech Republic	1–1	1–3	Friendly
2.	6 September 2006	Polish Army Stadium, Warsaw, Poland	Poland	1–1	1–1	UEFA Euro 2008 qual.
3.	11 October 2006	Stadion Crvena Zvezda, Beograd, Serbia	Armenia	2–0	3–0	UEFA Euro 2008 qual.
4.	17 October 2007	Tofik Bakhramov Stadium, Baku, Azerbaijan	Azerbaijan	1–6	1–6	UEFA Euro 2008 qual.
5.	21 November 2007	Stadion Crvena Zvezda, Beograd, Serbia	Poland	2–2	2–2	UEFA Euro 2008 qual.
6.	6 February 2008	Philip II Arena, Skopje, Republic of Macedonia	Macedonia	0–1	1–1	Friendly
7.	19 November 2008	Partizan Stadium, Beograd, Serbia	Bulgaria	6–1	6–1	Friendly
8.	10 February 2009	GSP Stadium, Nicosia, Cyprus	Cyprus	0–2	0–2	Friendly
9.	12 August 2009	Super Stadium, Atteridgeville, South Africa	South Africa	0–2	1–3	Friendly
10.	14 November 2009	Windsor Park, Belfast, Northern Ireland	Northern Ireland	0–1	0–1	Friendly
11.	3 September 2010	Tórsvøllur, Tórshavn, Faroe Islands	Faroe Islands	0–1	0–3	UEFA Euro 2012 qual.

== Honours ==
Partizan

- First League of Serbia and Montenegro: 2001–02, 2002–03
- Serbia and Montenegro Cup: 2000–01

PSV

- Eredivisie: 2007–08
- Johan Cruyff Shield: 2008

Zenit Saint Petersburg

- Russian Premier League: 2010, 2011–12
- Russian Cup: 2009–10
- Russian Super Cup: 2011

Videoton

- Nemzeti Bajnokság I: 2017–18
