= Nenad Mišković =

Bosnia and Herzegovina footballer

Personal information
- Full name: Nenad Mišković
- Date of birth: 13 October 1975 (age 51)
- Place of birth: Sarajevo, SFR Yugoslavia
- Height: 1.73 m (5 ft 8 in)
- Position: Defender

Youth career
- Željezničar

Senior career*
Years	Team	Apps	(Gls)
1993–1997	Radnički Beograd	83	(1)
1997	Roda JC	3	(0)
1998	Proleter Zrenjanin	28	(2)
1999–2004	Partizan	64	(5)
2004–2005	Cercle Brugge	12	(0)
2005–2006	Rad	5	(0)
2006–2007	Mladost Apatin	23	(0)
2007–2008	Banat Zrenjanin	8	(0)
Total		226	(8)

International career
2000–2003	Bosnia and Herzegovina	7	(0)
- * Club domestic league appearances and goals

Nenad Mišković (Serbian Cyrillic: Ненад Мишковић; born 13 October 1975) is a Bosnian former professional footballer who played as a defender.

== Club career ==
During his playing career, Mišković represented numerous clubs, namely Radnički Beograd, Roda JC, Proleter Zrenjanin, Partizan, Cercle Brugge, Rad, Mladost Apatin and Banat Zrenjanin.

== International career ==
He made his debut for Bosnia and Herzegovina in a March 2000 friendly match against Macedonia and has earned a total of 7 caps, scoring no goals. His final international was a February 2003 friendly away against Wales.

== Career statistics ==
=== International ===
Bosnia and Herzegovina
Year	Apps	Goals
2000	1	0
2001	1	0
2002	4	0
2003	1	0
Total	7	0

== Honours ==
Partizan

- First League of Serbia and Montenegro: 1998–99, 2001–02, 2002–03
- Serbia and Montenegro Cup: 2000–01
