= Aleksandar Brđanin =

Slovenian footballer

Personal information
- Full name: Aleksandar Brđanin
- Date of birth: 18 January 1981 (age 45)
- Place of birth: Ljubljana, SFR Yugoslavia
- Height: 1.85 m (6 ft 1 in)
- Position: Striker

Youth career
- Red Star Belgrade

Senior career*
Years	Team	Apps	(Gls)
2001–2002	OFK Beograd	7	(2)
2002–2004	Metalurh Zaporizhzhia	16	(0)
2004	Leotar	3	(0)
2005–2006	Jedinstvo Bijelo Polje	8	(0)
2006	Radnik Bijeljina	9	(0)
2008-2009	Kom	16	(1)
2009	Kaposvár	0	(0)
2010	Sloboda Užice	0	(0)
2010	Mash'al Mubarek	7	(2)
2011	Barcsi SC	7	(1)
2011	Žarkovo	3	(0)
2012–2014	Vršac		
- * Club domestic league appearances and goals as of 10 February 2012

Aleksandar Brđanin (Serbian Cyrillic: Александар Брђанин; born January 18, 1981) is a Slovenian retired professional footballer who played as a striker.

== Club career ==
Born in Ljubljana, SR Slovenia, he started playing in the youth teams of Red Star Belgrade and his first senior club was another Serbian club, OFK Beograd. Afterwards, he played with Ukrainian FC Metalurh Zaporizhzhia, Bosnian FK Leotar and FK Radnik Bijeljina, Timișoara and Montenegrin clubs FK Jedinstvo Bijelo Polje and FK Kom.

In summer 2010 Brđanin left Serbian side FK Sloboda Užice and moved to Uzbekistan to play with Mash'al Mubarek.
