= 2000–01 FR Yugoslavia Cup =

Tournament details
- Country: Yugoslavia
- Teams: 32

Final positions
- Champions: Partizan
- Runners-up: Red Star

Tournament statistics
- Matches played: 31
- Goals scored: 104 (3.35 per match)

The 2000–01 FR Yugoslavia Cup was the ninth season of the FR Yugoslavia's annual football cup. The cup defenders was Red Star Belgrade, but was defeated by FK Partizan in the final.

== First round ==
Thirty-two teams entered in the first round. The matches were played on 9 September 2000.

Team 1	Score	Team 2
Budućnost Banatski Dvor (II)	1–0	OFK Beograd
Budućnost Podgorica	0–1	Železničar Lajkovac (II)
Hajduk Beograd (II)	0–1	Red Star
Iskra Danilovgrad (II)	0–3	Sartid
Milicionar	6–0	Sloga Kraljevo (II)
Mladost Apatin (II)	3–0	Sutjeska
Mladost Lukićevo (II)	1–1 (8–7 p)	Radnički Niš
Mogren (II)	0–0 (1–3 p)	Hajduk Kula
Napredak Kruševac	3–4	Radnički Kragujevac
Partizan	4–3	Radnički Beograd (II)
Proleter Zrenjanin (II)	0–1	Obilić
Vojvodina	7–0	Spartak Subotica (II)
Vrbas (II)	0–0 (2–3 p)	Čukarički
Železnik	1–1 (5–3 p)	Mladost Lučani (II)
Zemun	2–0	Borac Čačak (II)
Zeta	2–0	Rad

Note: Roman numerals in brackets denote the league tier the clubs participated in the 2000–01 season.

== Second round ==
The 16 winners from the prior round enter this round. The matches were played on 7, 8, 9 and 22 November 2000.

Team 1	Score	Team 2
Radnički Kragujevac	2–4	Zeta
Čukarički	3–2	Zemun
Budućnost Banatski Dvor (II)	4–1	Milicionar
Mladost Lukićevo (II)	0–5	Partizan
Obilić	2–1	Vojvodina
Železničar Lajkovac (II)	1–1 (2–4 p)	Mladost Apatin (II)
Hajduk Kula	1–1 (5–3 p)	Železnik
Red Star	3–0	Sartid

Note: Roman numerals in brackets denote the league tier the clubs participated in the 2000–01 season.

== Quarter-finals ==
The eight winners from the prior round enter this round. The matches were played on 8 March and 4 April 2001.

Team 1	Score	Team 2
Mladost Apatin (II)	3–1	Zeta
Obilić	4–0	Hajduk Kula
Budućnost Banatski Dvor (II)	1–1 (4–5 p)	Red Star
Partizan	3–2	Čukarički

Note: Roman numerals in brackets denote the league tier the clubs participated in the 2000–01 season.

== Semi-finals ==
11 April 2001
16:00

Red Star	3–2	Mladost Apatin (II)
Gvozdenović 39'; Drulić 42'; Ačimovič 82' (pen.)		Ćirić 14'; Kekić 45' (pen.)

Red Star Stadium, Belgrade
Attendance: 4,000
Referee: Dragan Tripković (Kraljevo)
11 April 2001
16:00

Obilić	2–5	Partizan
Filipović 69'; Simonović 84'		Ivić 18'; Iliev 21', 74'; Bečanović 55'; Delibašić 70'

FK Obilić Stadium, Belgrade
Attendance: 4,000
Referee: Dejan Stanišić (Podgorica)

Note: Roman numerals in brackets denote the league tier the clubs participated in the 2000–01 season.

== Final ==
9 May 2001
17:00

Red Star	0–1	Partizan
	Report	Ilić 65'

Red Star Stadium, Belgrade
Attendance: 30,000
Referee: Miroslav Radoman (Lovćenac)

== See also ==
- 2000–01 First League of FR Yugoslavia
- 2000–01 Second League of FR Yugoslavia
