= Marko Jovanović (footballer, born 1978) =

Serbian footballer

Personal information
- Full name: Marko Jovanović
- Date of birth: 21 October 1978 (age 48)
- Place of birth: Niš, SFR Yugoslavia
- Height: 1.84 m (6 ft 0 in)
- Position: Forward

Team information
- Current team: Vojvodina (sporting director)

Youth career
- Radnički Niš
- Železničar Niš

Senior career*
| Years | Team | Apps | (Gls) |
| 1997–1998 | Železničar Niš | | |
| 1998–2000 | Zvezdara | | |
| 2000–2001 | Vučje | 25 | (8) |
| 2001–2006 | Vojvodina | 95 | (20) |
| 2003 | → Sichuan Guancheng (loan) | 22 | (5) |
| 2006 | Zagłębie Lubin | 5 | (0) |
| 2007 | Chornomorets Odesa | 3 | (0) |
| 2008 | Banat Zrenjanin | 10 | (0) |
| 2008–2009 | CFR Timișoara | | |
| 2009 | Hajduk Kula | 2 | (0) |
| 2010 | Proleter Novi Sad | 13 | (1) |
| 2010–2011 | Vllaznia Shkodër | 13 | (2) |
| 2011 | Bylis Ballsh | 9 | (0) |
| 2011 | Novi Sad | 9 | (2) |
| 2012 | Dubočica | | |
| 2014 | Mačva Šabac | 6 | (0) |
| Total | | 212 | (38) |

Managerial career
- 2014–2018: Radnički Niš (sporting director)
- 2022–: Vojvodina (sporting director)
- * Club domestic league appearances and goals

Marko Jovanović (Serbian Cyrillic: Марко Јовановић; born 21 October 1978) is a Serbian former professional footballer who played as a forward. He is the current sporting director of Vojvodina.

== Career ==
Jovanović spent five seasons with Vojvodina from 2001 to 2006, making 95 appearances and scoring 20 goals in the First League of Serbia and Montenegro. He also played abroad in China, Poland, Ukraine, Romania and Albania.

In November 2014, Jovanović was appointed as sporting director of Radnički Niš. He was dismissed from the position in August 2018 for undisclosed reasons. However, three months later, Jovanović was reappointed as sporting director of Radnički Niš.
