= 2001–02 First League of FR Yugoslavia =

First League of FR Yugoslavia
- Season: 2001–02
- Champions: Partizan; 17th domestic title
- Relegated: Mladost Lučani; Zvezdara; Mladost Apatin; Radnički Kragujevac
- Champions League: Partizan
- UEFA Cup: Red Star; Sartid
- Intertoto Cup: Obilić
- Matches: 306
- Goals: 771 (2.52 per match)
- Top goalscorer: Zoran Đurašković (27)

The 2001–02 First League of FR Yugoslavia was the tenth and last full season of the FR Yugoslavia's top-level football league since its establishment. It was contested by 18 teams (15 from Serbia and 3 from Montenegro), and Partizan won the championship.

== Teams ==
Budućnost Podgorica, Napredak Kruševac, Radnički Niš, and Milicionar, were relegated to the Second League of FR Yugoslavia.

The relegated teams were replaced by 2000–01 Second League of FR Yugoslavia champions, Mladost Apatin (North), Zvezdara (East), Mladost Lučani (West) and Rudar Pljevlja (South).

Location of teams in the 2001–02 First League

Club	City	Stadium	Capacity
Partizan	Belgrade	Partizan Stadium	32,710
Red Star	Belgrade	Red Star Stadium	55,538
Vojvodina	Novi Sad	Karađorđe Stadium	17,204
Zemun	Zemun, Belgrade	Zemun Stadium	10,000
Rad	Belgrade	Stadion Kralj Petar I	6,000
Hajduk Kula	Kula	Stadion Hajduk	6,000
Obilić	Belgrade	FK Obilić Stadium	4,500
Železnik	Belgrade	Železnik Stadium	8,000
OFK Beograd	Karaburma, Belgrade	Omladinski Stadium	20,000
Sartid	Smederevo	Smederevo City Stadium	17,200
Radnički	Kragujevac	Čika Dača Stadium	15,000
Čukarički	Belgrade	Stadion Čukarički	7,000
Sutjeska	Nikšić	Gradski stadion (Nikšić)	10,800
Zeta	Golubovci	Stadion Trešnjica	7,000
Mladost Apatin	Apatin	SC Rade Svilar	6,000
Mladost Lučani	Lučani	Mladost Stadium	6,000
Zvezdara	Zvezdara, Belgrade	Stadion FK Zvezdara	2,000
Rudar Pljevlja	Pljevlja	Stadion pod Golubinjom	10,000

== League table ==
Pos	Team	Pld	W	D	L	GF	GA	GD	Pts	Qualification or relegation
1	Partizan (C)	34	25	6	3	85	33	+52	81	Qualification for Champions League second qualifying round
2	Red Star Belgrade	34	18	12	4	54	28	+26	66	Qualification for UEFA Cup qualifying round
3	Sartid	34	17	7	10	46	36	+10	58	Qualification for UEFA Cup qualifying round
4	Obilić	34	16	8	10	52	41	+11	56	Qualification for Intertoto Cup first round
5	Zeta	34	15	7	12	48	50	−2	52	
6	Železnik	34	14	7	13	41	42	−1	49	
7	Rudar Pljevlja	34	13	8	13	35	33	+2	47	
8	Vojvodina	34	10	16	8	34	26	+8	46	
9	OFK Beograd	34	12	10	12	44	37	+7	46	
10	Rad	34	13	7	14	45	41	+4	46	
11	Sutjeska	34	14	4	16	32	45	−13	46	
12	Zemun	34	12	9	13	49	43	+6	45	
13	Hajduk Kula	34	12	9	13	38	42	−4	45	
14	Čukarički	34	12	7	15	40	40	0	43	
15	Mladost Lučani (R)	34	12	6	16	42	42	0	42	Relegation to Second League of Serbia and Montenegro
16	Zvezdara (R)	34	7	8	19	35	64	−29	29	Relegation to Second League of Serbia and Montenegro
17	Mladost Apatin (R)	34	4	12	18	26	64	−38	24	Relegation to Second League of Serbia and Montenegro
18	Radnički Kragujevac (R)	34	6	5	23	25	64	−39	23	Relegation to Second League of Serbia and Montenegro

Source: RSSSF.org
Rules for classification: 1) points; 2) goal difference; 3) number of goals scored.
(C) Champions; (R) Relegated

== Results ==
Home \ Away	ČUK	HAJ	MAP	MLU	OBI	OFK	PAR	RAD	RDK	RSB	RUD	SAR	SUT	VOJ	ŽEL	ZEM	ZET	ZVE
Čukarički		1–0	6–0	0–1	1–3	1–1	0–1	3–1	3–0	2–0	1–0	1–3	1–0	0–0	1–2	1–0	1–1	3–2
Hajduk Kula	1–0		4–0	1–0	0–2	3–2	2–3	2–0	1–0	1–1	1–1	0–2	2–1	1–1	1–0	2–0	1–0	3–1
Mladost Apatin	1–1	2–0		1–1	1–1	0–0	1–3	0–0	1–0	1–2	0–0	1–1	0–1	0–1	0–0	0–1	2–1	4–1
Mladost Lučani	1–0	3–2	1–0		3–1	2–0	1–2	1–4	3–0	0–1	0–1	1–0	3–0	2–1	1–1	2–1	2–3	6–1
Obilić	1–0	0–0	4–2	4–2		4–2	1–3	0–0	2–1	2–2	1–0	2–0	2–1	1–0	3–1	2–1	2–2	1–0
OFK Beograd	3–0	2–0	8–2	2–1	2–1		1–1	3–1	2–0	1–1	1–0	0–1	5–0	0–0	1–0	0–2	1–1	0–1
Partizan	3–2	3–0	4–0	2–1	2–1	3–3		2–0	6–0	0–3	3–0	3–1	3–1	1–2	2–0	3–0	4–0	1–1
Rad	3–2	2–1	3–0	1–1	2–3	2–0	2–3		3–0	0–0	1–2	0–0	1–0	2–1	0–0	1–2	2–0	5–1
Radnički Kragujevac	1–2	1–1	3–0	1–0	3–2	1–0	2–2	0–2		0–1	1–0	0–0	1–2	0–2	1–3	1–4	3–1	1–3
Red Star	3–2	1–1	1–1	1–0	2–1	3–0	0–0	1–0	3–0		3–1	5–2	1–0	2–2	4–0	1–1	1–1	3–1
Rudar Pljevlja	0–0	1–1	2–1	0–0	1–0	1–2	2–2	1–2	4–0	1–0		0–1	3–0	0–0	3–0	3–2	1–0	2–0
Sartid	0–1	2–0	2–1	1–1	2–0	2–0	0–1	2–1	1–0	2–1	2–2		2–1	0–2	1–0	2–1	0–2	2–2
Sutjeska	0–1	3–1	3–0	1–0	0–0	1–0	1–7	1–1	3–0	0–0	1–0	3–2		1–0	2–1	0–0	1–0	1–0
Vojvodina	1–1	0–0	1–1	0–0	1–0	2–0	0–2	0–0	2–1	0–0	3–0	0–2	2–0		0–1	4–1	0–0	1–1
Železnik	1–1	1–0	2–0	1–0	0–0	0–0	1–2	3–0	1–0	4–2	1–0	2–1	2–1	1–1		1–1	3–1	2–0
Zemun	3–0	1–3	2–2	4–0	0–0	0–0	1–3	2–1	1–1	0–2	2–0	0–2	2–0	2–2	4–2		2–0	0–0
Zeta	2–1	4–1	3–0	2–1	4–3	0–0	3–1	1–0	2–1	1–2	0–1	2–2	2–1	2–1	3–2	2–1		2–0
Zvezdara	1–0	1–1	1–1	2–1	0–2	0–2	0–4	3–0	1–1	0–1	1–2	0–3	0–1	1–1	3–2	0–5	6–0	

Source: Soccerway
Legend: Blue = home team win; Yellow = draw; Red = away team win.

== Winning squad ==
Champions: Partizan Belgrade (Coach: Ljubiša Tumbaković)

Players (appearances/goals)

- (Federal Republic of Yugoslavia) Radovan Radaković
- (Federal Republic of Yugoslavia) Vuk Rašović
- (Federal Republic of Yugoslavia) Dragoljub Jeremić
- (Federal Republic of Yugoslavia) Igor Duljaj
- (Federal Republic of Yugoslavia) Dejan Ognjanović
- (North Macedonia) Milan Stojanoski
- (Federal Republic of Yugoslavia) Goran Trobok
- (Federal Republic of Yugoslavia) Andrija Delibašić
- (Federal Republic of Yugoslavia) Zvonimir Vukić
- (Federal Republic of Yugoslavia) Damir Čakar
- (Federal Republic of Yugoslavia) Miladin Bečanović
- (Federal Republic of Yugoslavia) Radiša Ilić
- (Bosnia and Herzegovina) Nenad Mišković
- (Federal Republic of Yugoslavia) Ivan Stanković
- (Federal Republic of Yugoslavia) Aleksandar Nedović
- (Federal Republic of Yugoslavia) Ivica Iliev
- (Federal Republic of Yugoslavia) Vladimir Ivić
- (Federal Republic of Yugoslavia) Ajazdin Nuhi
- (Federal Republic of Yugoslavia) Saša Ilić
- (Federal Republic of Yugoslavia) Dejan Rusmir
- (Federal Republic of Yugoslavia) Branko Savić
- (Bosnia and Herzegovina) Branimir Bajić
- (Federal Republic of Yugoslavia) Ljubiša Ranković
- (Federal Republic of Yugoslavia) Milan Milijaš
- (Federal Republic of Yugoslavia) Milivoje Ćirković
- (Federal Republic of Yugoslavia) Danko Lazović
- (Federal Republic of Yugoslavia) Đorđe Pantić

== Top goalscorers ==
Rank	Player	Club	Goals
1	(Federal Republic of Yugoslavia) Zoran Đurašković	Mladost Lučani	27
2	(Federal Republic of Yugoslavia) Ilija Stolica	Zemun	19
3	(Federal Republic of Yugoslavia) Nenad Mirosavljević	Sartid	14
3	(Federal Republic of Yugoslavia) Zvonimir Vukić	Partizan	14
5	(Federal Republic of Yugoslavia) Igor Bogdanović	Vojvodina	13
5	(Federal Republic of Yugoslavia) Bojan Filipović	Obilić	13
7	(Federal Republic of Yugoslavia) Nenad Mladenović	Obilić	12
7	(Federal Republic of Yugoslavia) Dejan Batrović	Zeta	12
7	(Federal Republic of Yugoslavia) Dejan Živković	Zvezdara	12
7	(Federal Republic of Yugoslavia) Saša Ilić	Partizan	12

== Exdternal links ==
- Tables and results at RSSSF
