= Marko Čolaković =

Montenegrin footballer

Personal information
- Full name: Marko Čolaković
- Date of birth: 20 July 1980 (age 46)
- Place of birth: Titograd, SFR Yugoslavia
- Height: 1.81 m (5 ft 11 in)
- Position: Left-back

Senior career*
| Years | Team | Apps | (Gls) |
| 2000–2004 | Zeta | 89 | (4) |
| 2004–2007 | Wisła Płock | 20 | (1) |
| 2007–2010 | Zeta | 61 | (2) |
| 2010 | Kom | 21 | (1) |
| 2010–2011 | Mladost Podgorica | 23 | (0) |
| 2014 | Zeta | 26 | (0) |
| Total | | 240 | (8) |
- * Club domestic league appearances and goals

Marko Čolaković (born 20 July 1980) is a Montenegrin former professional footballer who played as a left-back.

== Honours ==
Wisła Płock

- Polish Super Cup: 2006
