= Vladimir Ivić =

Serbian football manager and player

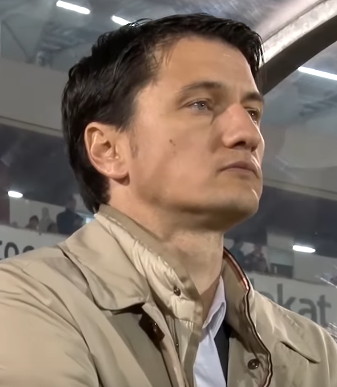
- Ivić in 2016

Personal information
- Date of birth: 7 May 1977 (age 49)
- Place of birth: Zrenjanin, SR Serbia, Yugoslavia
- Height: 1.91 m (6 ft 3 in)
- Position: Attacking midfielder

Team information
- Current team: Al Ain (manager)

Youth career
- Proleter Zrenjanin

Senior career*
Years	Team	Apps	(Gls)
1994–1998	Proleter Zrenjanin	67	(7)
1998–2004	Partizan	133	(64)
2004	Borussia Mönchengladbach	4	(1)
2004–2007	AEK Athens	56	(9)
2007–2008	Aris	29	(5)
2008–2012	PAOK	103	(20)
Total		392	(106)

International career
1997–1999	FR Yugoslavia U21 (Note: Official UEFA matches only)	4	(2)
2001–2004	FR Yugoslavia / Serbia and Montenegro	8	(0)
2001	FR Yugoslavia XI	5	(0)

Managerial career
- 2016–2017: PAOK
- 2018–2020: Maccabi Tel Aviv
- 2020: Watford
- 2022–2023: Maccabi Tel Aviv
- 2023–2024: Krasnodar
- 2025–: Al Ain
- * Club domestic league appearances and goals

Vladimir Ivić (Serbian Cyrillic: Владимир Ивић; born 7 May 1977) is a Serbian football manager who is the head coach of UAE Pro League club Al-Ain. A former Serbia and Montenegro international footballer, Ivić spent hundreds of matches with Partizan and PAOK at club level. After retirement, Ivić won back-to-back championship titles as Maccabi Tel Aviv manager in 2019 and 2020.

== Club career ==
Ivić began his career with Proleter Zrenjanin, making his senior debut in the 1994–95 season. He was transferred to Partizan in the summer of 1998. Over the next six years, Ivić helped the side win three championship titles and two domestic cups. He also made his UEFA Champions League debut in the 2003–04 campaign. After Saša Ilić's departure from the club in early 2004, Ivić became the team's captain. He scored a total of 64 league goals in 133 appearances with the Crno-beli.

In July 2004, Ivić signed a three-year contract with German club Borussia Mönchengladbach. He made just four league appearances and scored once in the team's 3–1 home victory against Werder Bremen. On 21 December he was transferred to the Greek side, AEK Athens, where his brother, Ilija was the technichal director. On 31 August 2007 Ivić was released from AEK and signed with fellow Super League club, Aris. He spent one year there, before switching to crosstown rivals PAOK in June 2008. Over the following four seasons, Ivić made 133 appearances and scored 24 goals across all competitions.

== International career ==
At international level, Ivić was capped eight times by Serbia and Montenegro between 2001 and 2004, making his debut as a substitute for Dejan Stanković in a World Cup 2002 qualifier against Switzerland, an eventual 1–1 draw. His final international was an April 2004 friendly match against Northern Ireland.

Ivić was previously a member of the team that represented his nation at the Millennium Super Soccer Cup, winning the tournament.

== Managerial career ==
=== 2010s ===
In June 2013, Ivić started working with PAOK's under-20 team. He led them to the league title in his first year for the role. In March 2016, Ivić was appointed manager of PAOK until the end of the season, following the departure of Igor Tudor. He won the Greek Cup in May 2017, before leaving the following month.

On 31 May 2018, Ivić officially took charge of Israeli club Maccabi Tel Aviv, penning a two-year deal with an option for a third season. He won the national championship in his debut season with a record 31-point margin and only one loss. In his second season, Ivić led the team to another championship title, only losing in the final league fixture.

=== 2020s ===
On 15 August 2020, Ivić was appointed as manager of Watford on a one-year contract with an option for a further year. He was sacked by the club on 19 December when they finished fifth in the league. Ivić returned to Maccabi Tel Aviv on 12 June 2022 on a two-year contract.

On 4 January 2023, Ivić was appointed manager of Russian Premier League club Krasnodar on a two-year deal. He was dismissed by the club on 13 March 2024. On 4 February 2025, Ivić was appointed coach of UAE Pro League club Al-Ain.

== Personal life ==
Ivić is the younger brother of fellow footballer Ilija Ivić.

== Career statistics ==
=== Club ===
Appearances and goals by club, season and competition
Club	Season	League			National cup (Note: Includes FR Yugoslavia Cup, Serbian Cup, Greek Football Cup)		Continental		Total	
Club	Season	Division	Apps	Goals	Apps	Goals	Apps	Goals	Apps	Goals
Proleter Zrenjanin	1994–95	First League of FR Yugoslavia	5	1			—		5	1
Proleter Zrenjanin	1995–96	First League of FR Yugoslavia	16	1			—		16	1
Proleter Zrenjanin	1996–97	First League of FR Yugoslavia	20	1			—		20	1
Proleter Zrenjanin	1997–98	First League of FR Yugoslavia	26	4			4	0	30	4
Proleter Zrenjanin	Total		67	7			4	0	71	7
Partizan	1998–99	First League of FR Yugoslavia	20	11	6	0	6	0	32	11
Partizan	1999–00	First League of FR Yugoslavia	30	18	1	0	8	3	39	21
Partizan	2000–01	First League of FR Yugoslavia	30	20	4	2	4	0	38	22
Partizan	2001–02	First League of FR Yugoslavia	23	8	1	0	1	2	25	10
Partizan	2002–03	First League of Serbia and Montenegro	13	3	1	0	6	2	20	5
Partizan	2003–04	First League of Serbia and Montenegro	17	4	3	2	2	0	22	6
Partizan	Total		133	64	16	4	27	7	176	75
Borussia Mönchengladbach	2004–05	Bundesliga	4	1	0	0	—		4	1
AEK Athens	2004–05	Alpha Ethniki	17	4	6	1	0	0	23	5
AEK Athens	2005–06	Alpha Ethniki	27	3	5	0	2	0	34	3
AEK Athens	2006–07	Super League Greece	12	2	0	0	5	1	17	3
AEK Athens	Total		56	9	11	1	7	1	74	11
Aris Thessaloniki	2007–08	Super League Greece	29	5	6	3	5	0	40	8
PAOK	2008–09	Super League Greece	28	7	4	0	—		32	7
PAOK	2009–10	Super League Greece	30	9	0	0	4	1	34	10
PAOK	2010–11	Super League Greece	23	2	5	0	10	3	38	5
PAOK	2011–12	Super League Greece	22	2	2	0	5	0	29	2
PAOK	Total		103	20	11	0	19	4	133	24
Career total			392	106	44	8	62	12	498	126

=== International ===
Appearances and goals by national team and year
National team	Year	Apps	Goals
Yugoslavia	2001	2	0
Yugoslavia	2002	5	0
Serbia and Montenegro	2003	0	0
Serbia and Montenegro	2004	1	0
Total		8	0

== Managerial statistics ==
As of 21 November 2025

Team	Nat	From	To	Record								
Team	Nat	From	To	G	W	D	L	GF	GA	GD	Win %	Ref
PAOK U20	(Greece)	9 March 2014	5 March 2016	59	40	9	10	154	65	+89	67.80	
PAOK	(Greece)	9 March 2016	10 June 2017	70	41	12	17	114	49	+65	58.57	
Maccabi Tel Aviv	(Israel)	31 May 2018	7 July 2020	91	61	22	8	165	44	+121	67.03	
Watford	(England)	15 August 2020	19 December 2020	22	10	7	5	25	19	+6	45.45	
Maccabi Tel Aviv	(Israel)	12 June 2022	3 January 2023	23	16	3	4	53	13	+40	69.57	
Krasnodar	(Russia)	4 January 2023	13 March 2024	48	27	11	10	83	53	+30	56.25	
Al Ain	(United Arab Emirates)	4 February 2025	present	81	50	16	15	162	77	+85	61.73	
Total				394	245	80	69	786	320	+466	62.18	—

== Honours ==
=== Player ===
Partizan

- First League of FR Yugoslavia: 1998–99, 2001–02, 2002–03
- FR Yugoslavia Cup: 2000–01

=== Manager ===
PAOK U20

- Greek Superleague U19: 2013–14

PAOK

- Greek Cup: 2016–17

Maccabi Tel Aviv

- Israeli Premier League: 2018–19, 2019–20
- Toto Cup Al: 2018–19
- Israel Super Cup: 2019

Krasnodar

- Russian Cup runner-up: 2023

Al Ain

- UAE Pro League: 2025–26
- UAE President's Cup: 2025–26
- UAE League Cup runner-up: 2025–26

Individual

- Super League Greece Manager of the Season: 2016–17
- EFL Championship Manager of the Month: November 2020
- Russian Premier League Manager of the Month: July/August 2023, September 2023.
