= Saša Ilić (footballer, born 1977) =

Serbian footballer

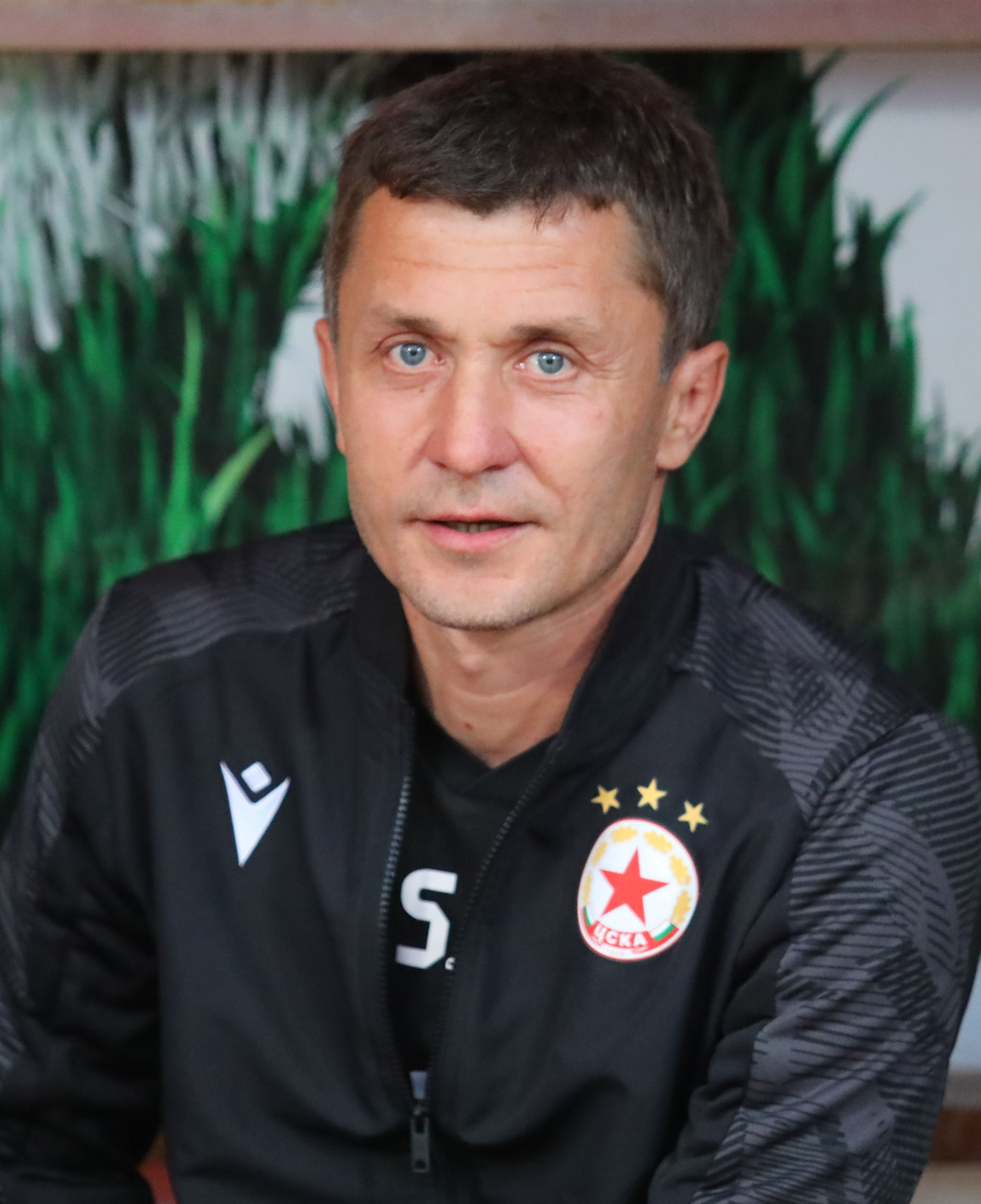
- Ilić with CSKA Sofia in 2022

Personal information
- Full name: Saša Ilić
- Date of birth: 30 December 1977 (age 48)
- Place of birth: Požarevac, SR Serbia, SFR Yugoslavia
- Height: 1.78 m (5 ft 10 in)
- Position: Midfielder

Team information
- Current team: TBD

Youth career
- 1986–1996: Partizan

Senior career*
Years	Team	Apps	(Gls)
1996–2005	Partizan	200	(98)
2004	→ Celta Vigo (loan)	13	(1)
2005–2007	Galatasaray	59	(22)
2007–2010	Red Bull Salzburg	34	(8)
2009	→ AEL (loan)	12	(1)
2010–2019	Partizan	224	(28)
Total		542	(158)

International career
2000–2008	Serbia (Note: Including 29 caps and 4 goals for Serbia and Montenegro (known as FR Yugoslavia until 2003))	37	(4)

Managerial career
- 2019: Serbia U17 (assistant)
- 2019–2020: Serbia U16
- 2019–2020: Serbia U21 (assistant)
- 2021: Serbia (assistant)
- 2021–2022: Čukarički
- 2022–2023: CSKA Sofia
- 2023–2024: Atromitos
- 2024: Pari Nizhny Novgorod
- 2025–2026: Sumgayit
- 2026: Partizan
- * Club domestic league appearances and goals

Saša Ilić (Serbian Cyrillic: Саша Илић, pronounced [sâʃa îlitɕ]; born 30 December 1977) is a Serbian professional football manager.

After spending more than 20 years at Partizan, both youth and senior teams, Ilić became the most capped player in the club's history with more than 800 appearances (official and friendlies). He won 18 trophies with the Crno-beli, including 11 national championship titles and seven national cups. Additionally, Ilić is Partizan's most capped player in European club competitions with 113 appearances.

At international level, Ilić was capped for his country under three different names, between 2000 and 2008, making a total of 37 appearances to his name. He represented Serbia and Montenegro at the 2006 FIFA World Cup.

== Club career ==
=== Partizan ===
Born in Požarevac, Ilić initially came to Partizan in 1986 when his father Milan took him to a training session led by Florijan Matekalo. He was officially registered by the club on 5 September 1988, eventually passing through all the youth ranks at Partizan. In order to gain some first-team experience, Ilić also spent one season with Teleoptik.

Ilić made his competitive debut for Partizan on 26 October 1996, coming on as a second-half substitute in a 10–0 away victory over Borac Čačak, wearing the number 1 shirt. That was his only appearance in the 1996–97 season, in which the club defended the championship title. In the following season, Ilić made his debut on the international scene, providing a late second-half assist to Dragan Isailović in a 1–0 home win over Croatia Zagreb on 23 July 1997. However, they were eliminated after a shocking 5–0 loss at Maksimir. On 23 August 1997, Ilić scored his first goal for Partizan, in a 3–2 away win against Vojvodina. He made a total of 25 league appearances that season, scoring three goals.

In the summer of 1998, after the departure of Ivan Tomić to Roma, Ilić became the team's captain, being only 20 years old at the time. With the new role on the pitch, Ilić was instrumental in helping Partizan win a national championship after a one-year absence. He also played in the UEFA Cup Winners' Cup, where Partizan were eliminated in the second round by Lazio, the eventual winner of the competition.

In the following years, Ilić established himself as a team leader and became an idol among the fans, while also receiving his first national team call-ups in 2000. He scored the winning goal in the national cup final in 2001, giving his team a 1–0 victory against arch-rivals at their ground. Additionally, Ilić finished the season as the club's top scorer with 26 goals in all competitions.

Ilić subsequently led the club to back-to-back national championships in 2002 and 2003. In European competitions, Ilić finally managed to qualify with Partizan for the UEFA Champions League in the 2003–04 season, after eliminating Newcastle United in the last qualification round. Drawn in a group with Porto, Real Madrid and Marseille, Ilić played in all six matches as Partizan recorded three draws and three losses.

In the 2004 winter transfer window, Ilić was loaned to Spanish club Celta de Vigo, on a six-month period with an option for a permanent deal. He was joined by two compatriots, manager Radomir Antić and striker Savo Milošević. Ilić made his debut for the side on 8 February 2004, in a 2–1 home win over Villarreal. He then scored the opening goal against Real Madrid at Santiago Bernabéu later that month, but Celta would go on to lose the match 2–4. Eventually, after Celta got relegated from the Primera División, Ilić eventually left Vigo.

In the summer of 2004, Ilić returned to Partizan after a six-month loan spell at Celta, taking the captain's armband from Vladimir Ivić, who left the club that summer. His return coincided with comebacks of ex-Partizan captains, Dragan Ćirić and Ivan Tomić. With experienced trio, Partizan had a memorable season, winning the league with an unbeaten record. They also progressed to the round of 16 in the UEFA Cup, losing to the eventual champion CSKA Moscow.

=== Galatasaray ===
After a successful comeback season with Partizan, Ilić moved abroad for the second time and signed a three-year contract with Turkish club Galatasaray on 8 July 2005. He chose to wear his traditional number 22, despite being offered the prestigious number 10 shirt. On 7 August 2005, Ilić scored a brace on his Galatasaray and Süper Lig debut, giving his team a 2–1 win over Konyaspor. He scored another brace in a 3–2 home win over Beşiktaş on 12 October 2005. With a total of 12 goals, Ilić was the team's third-highest scorer in the 2005–06 season, helping the club return the championship title to Ali Sami Yen after four years.

Subsequently, Ilić made an excellent start of the 2006–07 season by scoring five goals in the first four league rounds. In the UEFA Champions League, Ilić was in form scoring goals against PSV and Liverpool. However, Galatasaray narrowly missed out on the UEFA Cup spot, finishing fourth in the group.

=== Red Bull Salzburg ===
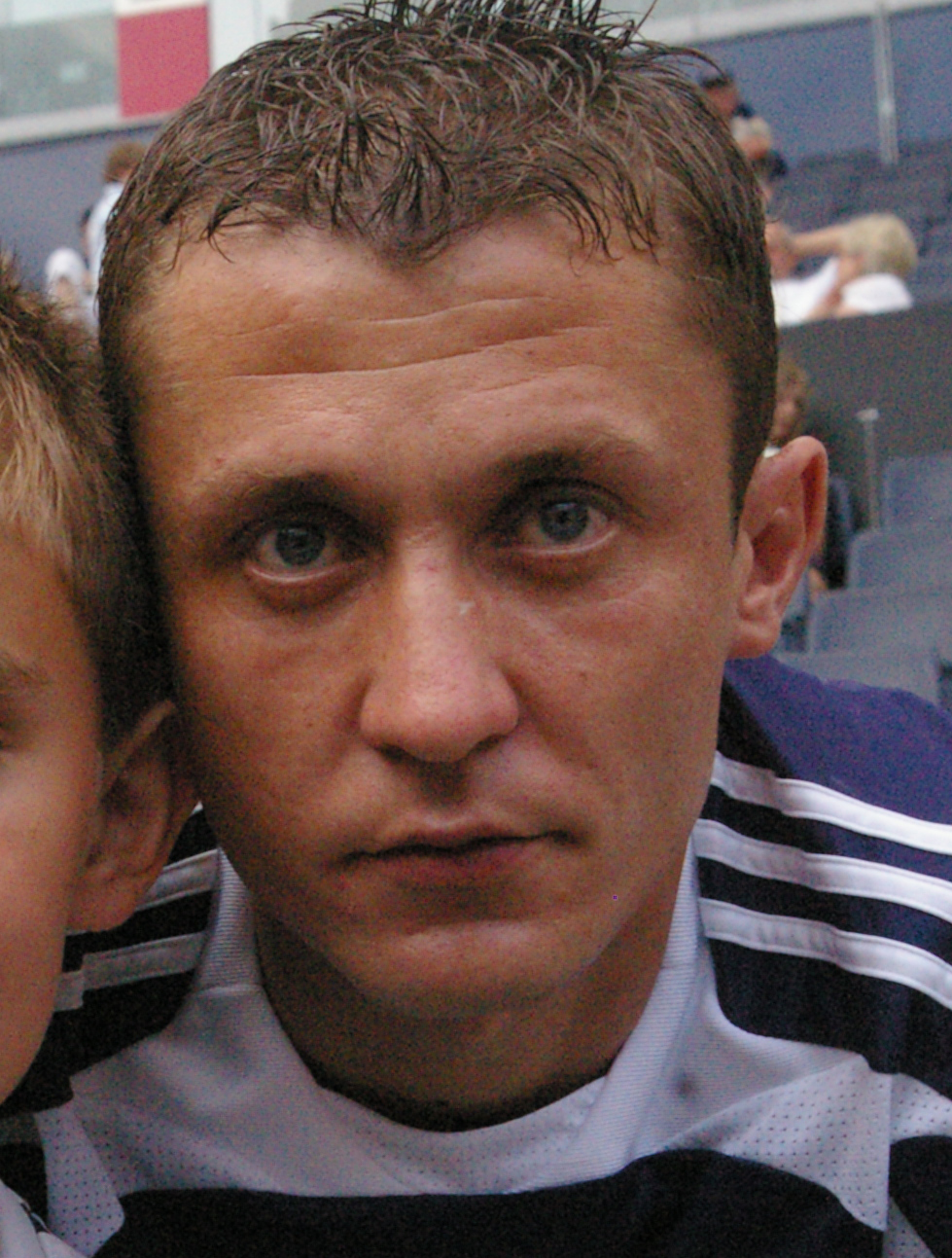
Ilić with Red Bull Salzburg in 2009

In June 2007, Ilić was officially transferred to Red Bull Salzburg, signing a three-year contract. He decided to join the Austrian side at the insistence of Lothar Matthäus, as they previously successfully collaborated at Partizan. However, only a few days later, Matthäus was released by Salzburg. Ilić scored his first goal for the club on 8 August 2007, in a Champions League qualifier against Latvian side Ventspils.

In January 2009, Ilić signed with Greek club AEL on loan until the end of the 2008–09 season. He scored his only goal for the club in the Super League Greece playoffs against AEK Athens.

Upon his return to Salzburg, Ilić saw very infrequent opportunities to play for Red Bull. He was suspended by the club's board in September 2009 because of the alleged betting against Salzburg in their UEFA Europa League game with Lazio. However, Ilić dismissed the accusation of betting against his own team, but admitted to betting on the other matches. His teammate and countryman, Đorđe Rakić was also involved, but there were no consequences for him.

=== Return to Partizan ===
On 22 January 2010, Ilić officially rejoined Partizan from Red Bull Salzburg on a free transfer, penning a two-and-a-half-year contract. He was immediately assigned his old number 22 shirt and selected to be vice-captain to Mladen Krstajić by manager Goran Stevanović. On 27 February 2010, Ilić made his official comeback appearance for the club against Borac Čačak at the same place as of his first match fourteen years earlier. He missed only one out of 15 league games and scored three goals in the second part of the 2009–10 season, as the club won their third consecutive title.

Ilić scored his first goal of the 2010–11 campaign in a Champions League qualifier against Finnish champions HJK, showing glimpses of his old self. He helped the club progress to the group stage of the competition that season, first time after seven years, as well as to win a double. After Krstajić's retirement in the summer of 2011, Ilić became the captain for the third time, leading the team to another championship title at the end of that season.

In July 2012, Ilić signed a new one-year contract with the club to prolong his career until June 2013. He earned a place in the 2012–13 SuperLiga Team of the Season, also helping his team win its sixth consecutive title. Ilić again signed a one-year contract extension in the summer of 2013, as well as in the summer of 2014. He collected his 10th league title with Partizan in the 2014–15 season.

On 22 May 2015, Ilić signed another one-year deal with Partizan. He recorded his 100th appearance for the club in UEFA competitions on 29 July 2015, coming on as a substitute in a 1–1 away draw with Steaua București. In April 2016, Ilić scored two braces in two home league wins over Radnik Surdulica (3–2) and Mladost Lučani (4–0). He also played the full 90 minutes in the final of the 2015–16 Serbian Cup, as Partizan won the game 2–0.

On 10 June 2016, Ilić extended his stay with Partizan for another year. He became the club's most capped player of all-time on 22 October 2016, recording his 792nd appearance. On 27 December 2016, Ilić signed a new contract extension with Partizan which would keep him at the club until June 2018. He eventually celebrated his second domestic double with the club in May 2017, first as captain.

On 5 November 2017, Ilić became the oldest scorer in Serbian SuperLiga history by converting a penalty in a 3–1 away win against Mačva Šabac. He also scored a crucial 90th-minute goal in the second leg of the Serbian Cup semi-finals versus Čukarički on 9 May 2018, helping Partizan win the tie on the away goals rule (aggregate score 4–4).

On 23 May 2019, Ilić played his last official match for Partizan coming on as a late second-half substitute in a 1–0 win over Red Star Belgrade in the final of the 2018–19 Serbian Cup. The legendary captain of Partizan spent over twenty years at the club, albeit with interruptions. During that time, Saša Ilić broke many records; he registered 873 games, surpassing Momčilo Vukotić, and in the match against OFK Beograd played on 30 March 2014 he scored the 119th goal in the championship matches and thereby managed to overtake Stjepan Bobek.

== International career ==
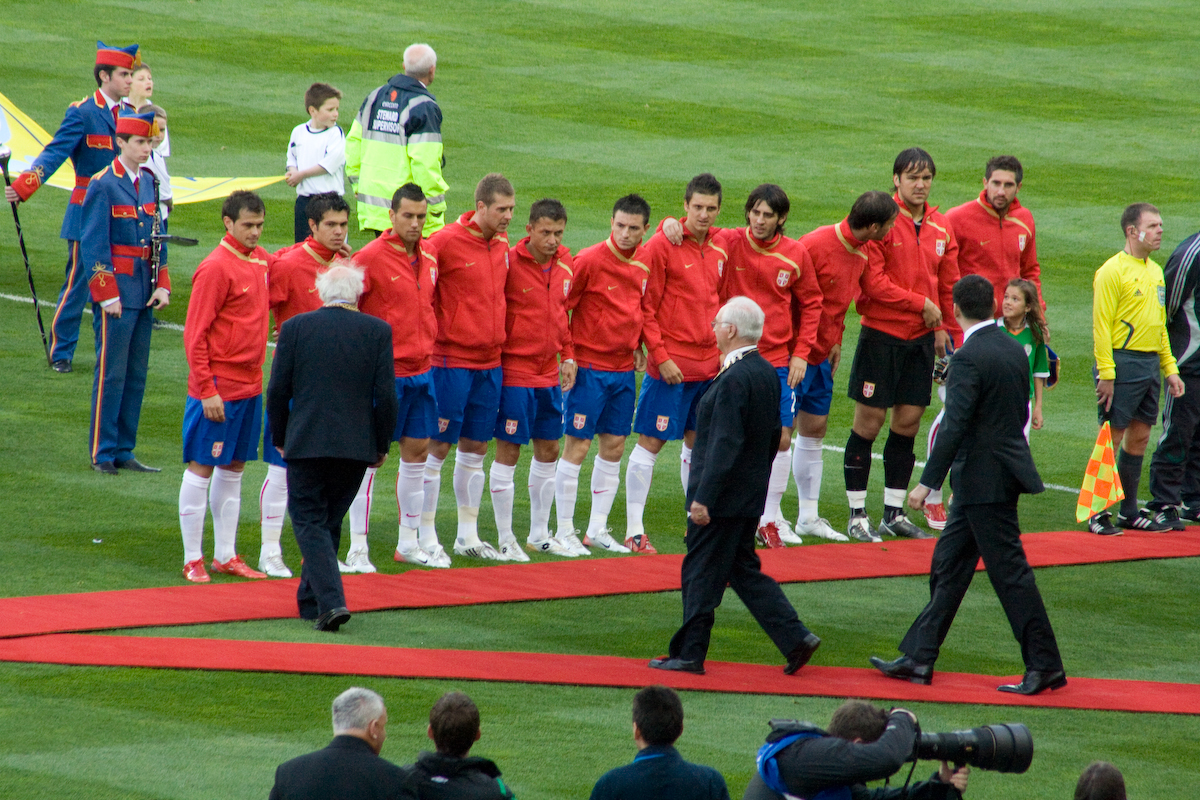
Ilić (fifth from left) lining up for Serbia before a friendly against Republic of Ireland in May 2008

Having already been capped at under-21 level under both Milan Živadinović and Milovan Đorić, Ilić made his full international debut for FR Yugoslavia under Ilija Petković on 16 August 2000, coming on as a second-half substitute for Nenad Grozdić in a 2–1 away friendly win against Northern Ireland. He was subsequently selected as the team's captain at the Millennium Super Soccer Cup in January 2001. Despite missing the final through suspension, Ilić led the side with three goals in four games, as they won the trophy. However, these caps are not officially recognized by FIFA. He eventually netted his first official goal for the national team on 17 April 2002, scoring the opener in a 4–1 home friendly win over Lithuania.

During the FIFA World Cup 2002 qualifying stage under Dejan Savićević, Ilić appeared in three matches, all as a substitute. He also played in two of his team's UEFA Euro 2004 qualifying games, scoring the equalizer in a 1–1 home draw to Italy on 10 September 2003. However, the country missed out on both final tournaments.

With the return of Ilija Petković at the helm of the national team, Ilić started receiving more playing time. He made eight appearances in 2005, scoring once in a FIFA World Cup 2006 qualifier versus Lithuania. On 16 May 2006, Ilić was named in the final 23-man squad to represent Serbia and Montenegro at the 2006 FIFA World Cup. He appeared in the last match of the group stage, playing the full 90 minutes and managing to score a goal against Ivory Coast in a thrilling 3–2 match, eventually won by the opposition.

On 16 August 2006, Ilić played for Serbia in their inaugural match against the Czech Republic. He also made two appearances in the team's unsuccessful UEFA Euro 2008 qualifying phase. Afterwards, Ilić failed to receive a call-up for the national team until March 2008, when Miroslav Đukić selected him for a friendly against Ukraine. He also appeared in a FIFA World Cup 2010 qualifier versus the Faroe Islands under Radomir Antić on 6 September 2008, in what would be his last international cap for the country.

== Coaching career ==
On 4 May 2024, Ilić was appointed manager of the Russian Premier League club Pari Nizhny Novgorod. Under his management, Pari avoided relegation by winning in the relegation play-offs.

On 5 October 2024, Ilić left Pari NN by mutual consent.

On 7 July 2025, Saša Ilić signed a one-year contract with Azerbaijan Premier League side Sumgayit FK to become the club’s head coach.

== Career statistics ==
=== Club ===
Appearances and goals by club, season and competition
Club	Season	League			National cup (Note: Includes Serbian Cup, Turkish Cup, Austrian Cup, Greek Cup)		Continental		Other		Total	
Club	Season	Division	Apps	Goals	Apps	Goals	Apps	Goals	Apps	Goals	Apps	Goals
Partizan	1996–97	First League of FR Yugoslavia	1	0	0	0	0	0	—		1	0
Partizan	1997–98	First League of FR Yugoslavia	25	3	9	5	2	0	—		36	8
Partizan	1998–99	First League of FR Yugoslavia	23	14	7	5	6	1	—		36	20
Partizan	1999–00	First League of FR Yugoslavia	32	17	2	1	7	3	—		41	21
Partizan	2000–01	First League of FR Yugoslavia	30	19	4	3	4	4	—		38	26
Partizan	2001–02	First League of FR Yugoslavia	28	12	3	0	3	0	—		34	12
Partizan	2002–03	First League of Serbia and Montenegro	25	11	2	0	8	2	—		35	13
Partizan	2003–04	First League of Serbia and Montenegro	14	6	1	0	10 (Note: Appearances in UEFA Champions League)	2	—		25	8
Partizan	2004–05	First League of Serbia and Montenegro	22	16	4	1	10 (Note: Appearances in UEFA Cup)	2	—		36	19
Partizan	Total		200	98	32	15	50	14	—		282	127
Celta (loan)	2003–04	La Liga	13	1	0	0	—		—		13	1
Galatasaray	2005–06	Süper Lig	30	12	4	0	0	0	—		34	12
Galatasaray	2006–07	Süper Lig	29	10	4	0	8	3	1 (Note: Appearance in Turkish Super Cup)	0	42	13
Galatasaray	Total		59	22	8	0	8	3	1	0	76	25
Red Bull Salzburg	2007–08	Austrian Bundesliga	30	8	0	0	1	1	—		31	9
Red Bull Salzburg	2008–09	Austrian Bundesliga	3	0	0	0	2	1	—		5	1
Red Bull Salzburg	2009–10	Austrian Bundesliga	1	0	1	0	4 (Note: Appearances in UEFA Europa League)	0	—		6	0
Red Bull Salzburg	Total		34	8	1	0	7	2	—		42	10
AEL (loan)	2008–09	Super League Greece	17	1	1	0	—		—		18	1
Partizan	2009–10	Serbian SuperLiga	14	3	1	0	—		—		15	3
Partizan	2010–11	Serbian SuperLiga	25	1	5	1	12	1	—		42	3
Partizan	2011–12	Serbian SuperLiga	25	4	5	1	6 (Note: Four appearances in UEFA Champions League, two appearances in UEFA Europa League)	0	—		36	5
Partizan	2012–13	Serbian SuperLiga	25	5	0	0	12 (Note: Four appearances in UEFA Champions League, eight appearances in UEFA Europa League)	0	—		37	5
Partizan	2013–14	Serbian SuperLiga	26	5	2	0	6 (Note: Four appearances in UEFA Champions League, two appearances in UEFA Europa League)	0	—		34	5
Partizan	2014–15	Serbian SuperLiga	27	3	5	0	11 (Note: Four appearances in UEFA Champions League, seven appearances in UEFA Europa League)	0	—		43	3
Partizan	2015–16	Serbian SuperLiga	28	6	5	0	8 (Note: Six appearances in UEFA Champions League, two appearances in UEFA Europa League)	0	—		41	6
Partizan	2016–17	Serbian SuperLiga	22	0	2	0	1	0	—		25	0
Partizan	2017–18	Serbian SuperLiga	20	1	4	1	7 (Note: Three appearances in UEFA Champions League, four appearances in UEFA Europa League)	0	—		31	2
Partizan	2018–19	Serbian SuperLiga	12	0	4	0	1	0	—		17	0
Partizan	Total		224	28	33	3	64	1	—		321	32
Career total			547	158	75	18	129	20	1	0	752	196

=== International ===
Appearances and goals by national team and year
National team	Year	Apps	Goals
FR Yugoslavia	2000	4	0
FR Yugoslavia	2001	2	0
FR Yugoslavia	2002	6	1
Serbia and Montenegro	2003	4	1
Serbia and Montenegro	2004	3	0
Serbia and Montenegro	2005	8	1
Serbia and Montenegro	2006	5	1
Serbia	2007	0	0
Serbia	2008	5	0
Total		37	4

Scores and results list Serbia's goal tally first.

No.	Date	Venue	Opponent	Score	Result	Competition
1	17 April 2002	Smederevo Stadium, Smederevo	Lithuania	1–0	4–1	Friendly
2	10 September 2003	Red Star Stadium, Belgrade	Italy	1–1	1–1	UEFA Euro 2004 qualification
3	3 September 2005	Red Star Stadium, Belgrade	Lithuania	2–0	2–0	2006 FIFA World Cup qualification
4	21 June 2006	Allianz Arena, Munich	Ivory Coast	2–0	2–3	2006 FIFA World Cup

== Managerial statistics ==
As of 24 October 2026

Managerial record by team and tenure
Team	Nat	From	To	Record							
Team	Nat	From	To	G	W	D	L	GF	GA	GD	Win %
Čukarički	(Serbia)	17 August 2021	11 April 2022	27	12	11	4	45	21	+24	44.44
CSKA Sofia	(Bulgaria)	2 June 2022	28 July 2023	47	31	9	7	77	26	+51	65.96
Atromitos	(Greece)	24 October 2023	2 May 2024	29	10	11	8	43	41	+2	34.48
Nizhny Novgorod	(Russia)	4 May 2024	5 October 2024	22	4	5	13	21	46	−25	18.18
Sumgayit	(Azerbaijan)	7 July 2025	8 June 2026	37	14	6	17	50	52	−2	37.84
Partizan	(Serbia)	9 June 2026	24 October 2026	18	8	2	8	29	27	+2	44.44
Total				182	80	43	59	267	213	+54	43.96

== Honours ==
=== Partizan ===
- First League of FR Yugoslavia: 1996–97, 1998–99, 2001–02, 2002–03, 2004–05
- FR Yugoslavia Cup: 1997–98, 2000–01
- Serbian SuperLiga: 2009–10, 2010–11, 2011–12, 2012–13, 2014–15, 2016–17
- Serbian Cup: 2010–11, 2015–16, 2016–17, 2017–18, 2018–19

=== Galatasaray ===
- Süper Lig: 2005–06

=== Individual ===
- Serbian SuperLiga Team of the Season: 2012–13
