= 2000–01 First League of FR Yugoslavia =

First League of FR Yugoslavia
- Season: 2000–01
- Dates: 12 August 2000 – 20 June 2001
- Champions: Red Star; 23rd domestic title
- Relegated: Budućnost Podgorica; Napredak Kruševac; Radnički Niš; Milicionar
- Champions League: Red Star
- UEFA Cup: Partizan; Obilić
- Intertoto Cup: Sartid
- Matches: 306
- Goals: 869 (2.84 per match)
- Top goalscorer: Petar Divić (27)

The 2000–01 First League of FR Yugoslavia was the ninth season of the FR Yugoslavia's top-level football league since its establishment. It was contested by 18 teams (15 from Serbia and three from Montenegro), and Red Star Belgrade won the championship.

== Incidents ==
=== Eternal derby abandoned ===
The 115th edition of the Eternal derby match between Red Star Belgrade and FK Partizan on Saturday, 14 October 2000 at the Marakana was abandoned after three minutes of play due to fan rioting. The incident began with Partizan fans, Grobari, pelting the pitch with flares at which point the match play got interrupted. The rioting kept escalating with the southern stand seating being torn off by the Grobari and thrown onto the athletic track. At one point, the team captain Saša Ilić was seen in front of the stand pleading to no avail with the Partizan ultra supporters to stop rioting. Dozens of Grobari eventually either jumped over or broke through the fence and began invading the pitch at which point the more numerous Red Star fans from the opposite end of the stadium stormed the pitch en masse, attacking the Partizan fans as well as Partizan players and coaching staff that were still on the pitch.

What ensued was mass brawling and running battles among the two sets of fans that led to the more numerous Red Star ultras quickly overpowering their Partizan counterparts and pushing them back towards the southern stand. In addition to injuries to a number Partizan fans that invaded the pitch, several Partizan players and members of the club's coaching staff reported injuries as a result of being attacked by the Red Star fans. Partizan's twenty-year-old forward Ivica Iliev received head injuries with hematoma from being punched in the face while the team's head coach Ljubiša Tumbaković ended up with a laceration above his eye.

Some thirty five minutes since the incident began, the match was officially called off. According to press reports, 35 fans and 2 policemen were injured, none severely. Six fans, two of them unconscious, were transported to Belgrade's Urgentni centar.

The match was replayed in full almost five months later, on Wednesday, 7 March 2001.

== Teams ==
Proleter Zrenjanin, Hajduk Beograd, Mogren, Spartak Subotica, and Borac Čačak were relegated to the Second League of FR Yugoslavia.

The relegated teams were replaced by 1999–2000 Second League of FR Yugoslavia champions, Napredak Kruševac (East) and Zeta (West).

Location of teams in the 2000–01 First League

Club	City	Stadium	Capacity
Partizan	Belgrade	Partizan Stadium	32,710
Red Star	Belgrade	Red Star Stadium	55,538
Vojvodina	Novi Sad	Karađorđe Stadium	17,204
Zemun	Zemun, Belgrade	Zemun Stadium	10,000
Rad	Belgrade	Stadion Kralj Petar I	6,000
Hajduk Kula	Kula	Stadion Hajduk	6,000
Obilić	Belgrade	FK Obilić Stadium	4,500
Železnik	Belgrade	Železnik Stadium	8,000
OFK Beograd	Karaburma, Belgrade	Omladinski Stadium	20,000
Sartid	Smederevo	Smederevo City Stadium	17,200
Radnički	Kragujevac	Čika Dača Stadium	15,000
Čukarički	Belgrade	Stadion Čukarički	7,000
Sutjeska	Nikšić	Gradski stadion (Nikšić)	10,800
Zeta	Golubovci	Stadion Trešnjica	7,000
Budućnost Podgorica	Podgorica	Podgorica City Stadium	12,000
Napredak Kruševac	Kruševac	Mladost Stadium	10,000
Radnički Niš	Niš	Čair Stadium	18,000
Milicionar	Belgrade	SC MUP Makiš	4,000

== League table ==
Pos	Team	Pld	W	D	L	GF	GA	GD	Pts	Qualification or relegation
1	Red Star Belgrade (C)	34	28	4	2	93	20	+73	88	Qualification for Champions League second qualifying round
2	Partizan	34	28	2	4	94	36	+58	86	Qualification for UEFA Cup qualifying round
3	Obilić	34	19	6	9	53	37	+16	63	Qualification for UEFA Cup qualifying round
4	Sartid	34	17	3	14	49	47	+2	54	Qualification for Intertoto Cup first round
5	OFK Beograd	34	15	5	14	52	45	+7	50	
6	Vojvodina	34	13	8	13	51	36	+15	47	
7	Sutjeska	34	14	4	16	52	64	−12	46	
8	Železnik	34	12	8	14	49	56	−7	44	
9	Radnički Kragujevac	34	13	5	16	38	52	−14	44	
10	Čukarički	34	13	4	17	42	50	−8	43	
11	Zemun	34	11	9	14	38	46	−8	42	
12	Hajduk Kula	34	12	6	16	45	51	−6	42	
13	Zeta	34	11	9	14	38	50	−12	42	
14	Rad	34	12	5	17	49	58	−9	41	
15	Budućnost Podgorica (R)	34	11	5	18	29	48	−19	38	Relegation to Second League of FR Yugoslavia
16	Napredak Kruševac (R)	34	8	10	16	38	63	−25	34	Relegation to Second League of FR Yugoslavia
17	Radnički Niš (R)	34	9	5	20	30	60	−30	32	Relegation to Second League of FR Yugoslavia
18	Milicionar (R)	34	8	6	20	29	50	−21	30	Relegation to Second League of FR Yugoslavia

Source: RSSSF.org
Rules for classification: 1) points; 2) goal difference; 3) number of goals scored.
(C) Champions; (R) Relegated

== Results ==
Home \ Away	BUD	ČUK	HAJ	MIL	NAP	OBI	OFK	PAR	RAD	RDK	RNI	RSB	SAR	SUT	VOJ	ŽEL	ZEM	ZET
Budućnost Podgorica		1–2	2–0	1–0	0–0	2–0	1–1	0–1	2–1	1–2	2–0	0–2	1–0	4–3	1–0	3–1	0–0	2–0
Čukarički	0–1		3–1	1–0	2–0	0–1	2–1	2–3	2–0	4–1	3–2	0–4	2–0	2–1	1–0	0–0	2–1	0–1
Hajduk Kula	2–0	2–0		1–0	2–1	1–3	1–0	4–4	0–0	3–1	0–0	0–0	5–0	1–2	2–0	6–0	2–0	1–0
Milicionar	2–0	1–1	2–1		2–0	2–1	3–3	1–2	2–0	1–0	0–0	0–3	1–2	1–2	0–2	1–2	1–1	2–1
Napredak Kruševac	2–1	3–1	1–3	0–0		2–4	3–1	0–0	3–2	3–4	1–1	1–2	1–2	2–0	1–0	3–1	1–1	2–0
Obilić	3–0	1–0	2–1	2–1	1–1		4–1	3–1	1–0	3–0	2–0	1–1	1–0	1–2	3–1	3–1	2–0	2–1
OFK Beograd	2–0	2–0	3–0	1–3	3–0	2–0		1–2	3–1	2–0	4–0	2–1	3–1	3–0	1–3	0–0	2–1	0–0
Partizan	2–0	6–2	4–0	1–0	4–0	3–0	4–1		2–1	4–0	2–1	2–1	3–1	4–0	3–1	4–2	4–1	4–1
Rad	4–1	3–1	4–1	2–1	4–2	1–0	0–3	1–3		1–1	3–1	1–3	3–2	3–2	1–1	0–1	2–1	3–2
Radnički Kragujevac	1–0	3–1	1–1	1–0	0–0	2–1	1–0	1–3	2–1		1–0	0–2	3–0	0–0	1–1	2–0	0–2	5–0
Radnički Niš	1–0	2–1	1–0	1–0	1–1	1–2	2–1	0–4	2–1	2–1		0–2	0–1	0–3	1–3	3–2	3–1	0–2
Red Star	2–1	1–0	3–0	4–1	9–1	4–0	4–0	2–0	3–1	4–0	3–0		5–1	3–1	3–0	5–1	2–1	3–0
Sartid	2–0	2–0	2–1	1–0	3–0	1–0	0–2	3–2	1–1	1–0	1–1	0–3		4–0	1–0	3–2	6–0	3–0
Sutjeska	1–1	1–4	1–0	0–0	2–0	1–1	4–2	3–4	2–1	2–3	2–1	1–2	2–1		1–0	3–0	3–2	2–1
Vojvodina	4–0	1–0	4–1	6–1	1–1	1–2	1–2	0–1	1–1	5–0	3–1	0–2	2–1	4–2		1–0	0–0	4–0
Železnik	4–0	1–1	2–1	2–0	3–2	1–1	0–0	3–2	2–0	2–0	4–2	1–2	1–1	3–0	0–0		2–0	1–1
Zemun	0–0	1–0	4–0	1–0	2–0	1–1	2–0	0–4	1–2	1–0	3–0	1–1	0–1	3–1	1–1	3–2		1–0
Zeta	3–1	2–2	1–1	4–0	0–0	1–1	1–0	0–2	3–0	1–0	1–0	2–2	2–1	3–2	0–0	3–2	1–1	

Source: RSSSF.org
Legend: Blue = home team win; Yellow = draw; Red = away team win.

== Winning squad ==
Champions: Red Star Belgrade (Coach: Slavoljub Muslin)

Players (league matches/league goals)

- (Slovenia) Milenko Ačimovič
- (Federal Republic of Yugoslavia) Srđan Bajčetić
- (Federal Republic of Yugoslavia) Branko Bošković
- (Federal Republic of Yugoslavia) Goran Bunjevčević
- (Federal Republic of Yugoslavia) Milivoje Vitakić
- (Federal Republic of Yugoslavia) Ivan Vukomanović
- (North Macedonia) Blaže Georgioski
- (Bosnia and Herzegovina) Stevo Glogovac
- (Federal Republic of Yugoslavia) Ivan Gvozdenović
- (Federal Republic of Yugoslavia) Goran Drulić
- (Federal Republic of Yugoslavia) Petar Đenić
- (Federal Republic of Yugoslavia) Saša Zorić
- (Federal Republic of Yugoslavia) Dejan Ilić
- (Federal Republic of Yugoslavia) Branko Jelić
- (Federal Republic of Yugoslavia) Aleksandar Kocić (goalkeeper)
- (Federal Republic of Yugoslavia) Nenad Lalatović
- (Federal Republic of Yugoslavia) Leo Lerinc
- (Federal Republic of Yugoslavia) Jovan Markoski
- (Federal Republic of Yugoslavia) Marjan Marković
- (Federal Republic of Yugoslavia) Vladimir Matijašević
- (Federal Republic of Yugoslavia) Vladislav Mirković
- (Federal Republic of Yugoslavia) Dejan Pešić
- (Federal Republic of Yugoslavia) Mihajlo Pjanović
- (Federal Republic of Yugoslavia) Dragan Stevanović

== Top goalscorers ==
Rank	Player	Club	Goals
1	(Federal Republic of Yugoslavia) Petar Divić	OFK Beograd	27
2	(Federal Republic of Yugoslavia) Dejan Osmanović	Hajduk Kula	25
3	(Federal Republic of Yugoslavia) Mihajlo Pjanović	Red Star	23
4	(Federal Republic of Yugoslavia) Vladimir Ivić	Partizan	20
5	(Federal Republic of Yugoslavia) Damir Čakar	Sutjeska	19
5	(Federal Republic of Yugoslavia) Saša Ilić	Partizan	19
5	(Federal Republic of Yugoslavia) Borislav Stevanović	Rad	19
8	(Federal Republic of Yugoslavia) Bojan Filipović	Obilić	18
8	(Federal Republic of Yugoslavia) Saša Marković	Železnik	18
10	(Federal Republic of Yugoslavia) Goran Drulić	Red Star	16
