= Andrija Delibašić =

Montenegrin footballer (1981–2025)

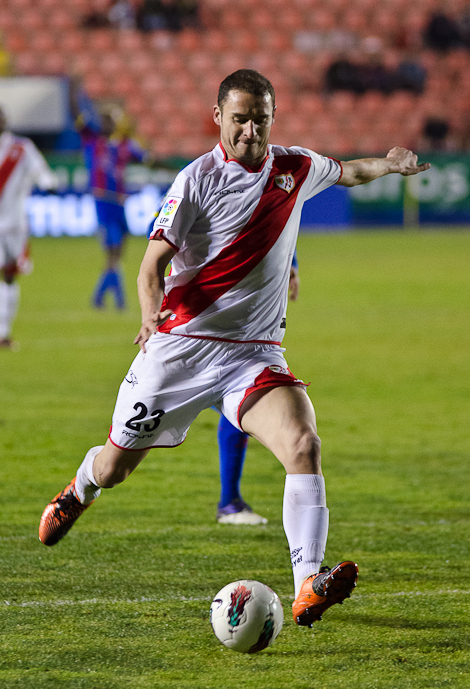
- Delibašić in action for Rayo Vallecano in 2012

Personal information
- Date of birth: 24 April 1981
- Place of birth: Nikšić, SR Montenegro, SFR Yugoslavia
- Date of death: 19 March 2025 (aged 43)
- Place of death: Podgorica, Montenegro
- Height: 1.88 m (6 ft 2 in)
- Position: Forward

Youth career
- Sutjeska
- 1995–1999: Partizan

Senior career*
| Years | Team | Apps | (Gls) |
| 1999–2004 | Partizan | 100 | (48) |
| 2004–2008 | Mallorca | 29 | (7) |
| 2005 | → Benfica (loan) | 3 | (0) |
| 2005–2006 | → Braga (loan) | 10 | (4) |
| 2006 | → AEK Athens (loan) | 10 | (1) |
| 2007 | → Beira-Mar (loan) | 11 | (1) |
| 2007–2008 | → Real Sociedad (loan) | 33 | (6) |
| 2008–2010 | Hércules | 65 | (20) |
| 2010–2013 | Rayo Vallecano | 81 | (14) |
| 2014 | Ratchaburi | 7 | (0) |
| 2015 | Sutjeska | 2 | (0) |
| Total | | 351 | (101) |

International career
| 1998–1999 | FR Yugoslavia U18 | 5 | (2) |
| 2001–2004 | Serbia and Montenegro U21 | 20 | (6) |
| 2004 | Serbia and Montenegro U23 | 3 | (0) |
| 2009–2013 | Montenegro | 21 | (6) |

Managerial career
- 2016–2018: Partizan (assistant)
- 2018–2021: Budućnost (assistant)
- 2021–2023: Mornar
Medal record
Men's football
Representing Serbia and Montenegro
UEFA European Under-21 Championship
| Runner-up | 2004 Germany |
- * Club domestic league appearances and goals

Andrija Delibašić (Cyrillic: Андрија Делибашић, pronounced [ǎndrija dělibaʃitɕ]; 24 April 1981 – 19 March 2025) was a Montenegrin professional footballer who played as a forward.

Delibašić began playing football at Partizan and went on to spend most of his career in Spain, representing Mallorca, Real Sociedad, Hércules and Rayo Vallecano and amassing totals of 208 matches and 47 goals the two major levels combined. He also competed professionally in Portugal and Greece.

== Club career ==
Delibašić started his professional career at Partizan Belgrade, where he played for three-and-a-half seasons making 126 appearances in total and scoring 63 goals. He played Champions League in season 2003–04 group stage, scoring three goals. On 16 September 2003, he scored the equalizer against Porto in a 1–1 home draw in the first matchday of group stage. Delibašić scored again on 26 November in the away match against Porto as well, in a 2–1 defeat. He scored his third goal in a 1–1 home draw against Marseille in the final matchday.

In January 2004, he was transferred to Mallorca, never establishing himself in the first team, his best output occurring in his first season with four goals in 17 matches. In early 2005, he was loaned to Benfica, that proved to be short and unsuccessful, as he saw only a few minutes of action.

For 2005–06, Delibašić was loaned again, to another Portuguese Primeira Liga club, Braga. The following campaign, two more loan spells befell: starting off at AEK Athens during the first half of the 2006/07 season, appearing in 15 matches for AEK, scoring 1 goal, and registering 1 assist. In January 2007 he was released and returned to Portugal, appearing for lowly Beira-Mar; his first match for the latter was against União de Leiria on 4 February.

In the 2007 pre-season, Delibašić came back to Mallorca and had some solid performances, scoring six goals in two matches – that was not enough to remain with the team, however, as they loaned him out again, this time to Real Sociedad of the Spanish second division. He was definitely released on 5 August 2008, joining Hércules (also second level) on a free transfer and penning a two-year contract.

After two seasons as first-choice with Alicante, achieving top flight promotion in 2010, Delibašić moved to another side in the second tier, Rayo Vallecano. He contributed with seven goals in 30 games, as the Madrilenians also reached the top flight.

In the following two years, Delibašić was used mainly as a substitute by Rayo, scoring a combined seven times as they managed to consecutively retain their league status. He left in June 2013.

On 13 February 2014, aged nearly 33, Delibašić joined Thai League 1 side Ratchaburi.

== International career ==
Delibašić played for the Serbia and Montenegro under-21 team that finished runners-up at the 2004 UEFA European Under-21 Championship in Germany. A couple of months later, he was also part of the Olympic team that exited in the first round.

After a loss of form dropped him from international play, Delibašić's chances for a callup increased in mid-2006 as Montenegro separated from Serbia and became an independent country, with him now eligible to play for the newly formed national team due to his birthplace. However, even before Montenegro's inaugural match squad was announced, he voiced his dissatisfaction in the press about not being contacted by Montenegrin football officials at all and then said that he would never play for the national team in the future, if he was not included on the list of inaugural callups.

In September 2009, Delibašić was summoned for Montenegro's match with Bulgaria, but did not play in the 4–1 defeat on the 5th. He finally made his debut on 10 October, scoring the 2–1 winner against Georgia; both matches were 2010 FIFA World Cup qualifiers.

Delibašić scored his second goal for the national team on 7 October 2011, a dramatic 2–2 home draw against England that led Montenegro to the UEFA Euro 2012 playoffs. He helped the hosts come from 2–0 behind with his last-minute header. He earned a total of 21 caps, scoring 6 goals. His final international was a June 2013 FIFA World Cup qualification match against Ukraine in Podgorica.

== Death ==
Delibašić died of brain cancer on 19 March 2025, at the age of 43.

== Career statistics ==
| # | Date | Venue | Opponent | Score | Result | Competition |
|---|---|---|---|---|---|---|
| 1 | 10 October 2009 | Podgorica City Stadium, Podgorica, Montenegro | Georgia | 2–1 | 2–1 | 2010 World Cup qualiciation |
| 2 | 7 October 2011 | Podgorica City Stadium, Podgorica, Montenegro | England | 2–2 | 2–2 | Euro 2012 qualifying |
| 3 | 11 September 2012 | Stadio Olimpico, Serravalle, San Marino | San Marino | 0–5 | 0–6 | 2014 World Cup qualification |
| 4 | 11 September 2012 | Stadio Olimpico, Serravalle, San Marino | San Marino | 0–6 | 0–6 | 2014 World Cup qualification |
| 5 | 14 November 2012 | Podgorica City Stadium, Podgorica, Montenegro | San Marino | 1–0 | 3–0 | 2014 World Cup qualification |
| 6 | 14 November 2012 | Podgorica City Stadium, Podgorica, Montenegro | San Marino | 2–0 | 3–0 | 2014 World Cup qualification |

== Honours ==
Partizan

- First League of Serbia and Montenegro: 2001–02, 2002–03
- Serbia and Montenegro Cup: 2000–01

Benfica

- Primeira Liga: 2004–05
- Taça de Portugal runner-up: 2004–05
