= 2002–03 FK Sartid Smederevo season =

2002–03 season of FK Sartid Smederevo

Sartid Smederevo
2002–03 season
- Chairman: Čedomir Jevtić
- Manager: Jovica Škoro (until 20 April); Milenko Kiković (from 22 April)
- Stadium: Sartid Stadium
- First League of Serbia and Montenegro: 11th
- Serbia and Montenegro Cup: Winners
- UEFA Cup: First round
- Top goalscorer: League: Nenad Mirosavljević (15); All: Nenad Mirosavljević (20)
Home colours	Away colours

The 2002–03 season was FK Sartid Smederevo's fifth consecutive season in the unified First League of Serbia and Montenegro. The club won the Serbia and Montenegro Cup, its first-ever major trophy, defeating Red Star Belgrade 1–0 in the final with a golden goal from Marko Pantelić during extra time. The Cup win granted the team a spot in the 2003–04 UEFA Cup qualifying round.

== Squad statistics ==
No.	Pos.	Name	League		Cup		Europe		Total	
No.	Pos.	Name	Apps	Goals	Apps	Goals	Apps	Goals	Apps	Goals
1	GK	(Serbia and Montenegro) Nebojša Milekić	0	0	0	0	0	0	0	0
2	DF	(Serbia and Montenegro) Željko Damjanović	22	1	2	0	2	0	26	1
3	DF	(Serbia and Montenegro) Marko Sočanac	25	0	4	0	4	0	33	0
4	DF	(Serbia and Montenegro) Slavoljub Kizić	23	0	3	0	4	0	30	0
5	DF	(Serbia and Montenegro) Dragan Spasić	25	0	4	1	4	0	33	1
6	MF	(Serbia and Montenegro) Boris Vasković	26	1	4	1	4	0	34	2
7	MF	(Serbia and Montenegro) Goran Bogdanović	17	2	3	0	3	0	23	2
8	DF	(Serbia and Montenegro) Dragan Radosavljević	11	2	2	0	3	0	16	2
9	FW	(Serbia and Montenegro) Milorad Zečević	26	8	4	0	4	1	34	9
10	MF	(Serbia and Montenegro) Saša Kocić	23	1	4	0	2	0	29	1
11	DF	(Serbia and Montenegro) Dragan Paunović	21	0	3	0	2	0	26	0
12	GK	(Serbia and Montenegro) Dragan Žilić	33	0	5	0	4	0	42	0
13	MF	(Serbia and Montenegro) Vladimir Mudrinić	10	1	2	0	0	0	12	1
16	DF	(Serbia and Montenegro) Goran Đurković	20	0	1	0	2	0	23	0
17	DF	(Serbia and Montenegro) Nebojša Savić	20	0	3	0	3	0	26	0
18	FW	(Serbia and Montenegro) Nikola Jevtić	0	0	0	0	0	0	0	0
19	MF	(Serbia and Montenegro) Radivoj Panić	13	1	2	0	0	0	15	1
21	MF	(Serbia and Montenegro) Demir Ramović	24	2	2	1	2	0	28	3
22	GK	(Serbia and Montenegro) Dejan Ranković	2	0	0	0	0	0	2	0
23	MF	(Serbia and Montenegro) Zoran Kulić	17	3	1	0	3	0	21	3
24	DF	(Serbia and Montenegro) Milorad Mrdak	8	0	2	0	0	0	10	0
25	FW	(Serbia and Montenegro) Marko Pantelić	16	5	2	1	0	0	18	6
26	DF	(Serbia and Montenegro) Ivan Živanović	2	0	1	0	0	0	3	0
27	MF	(Serbia and Montenegro) Dejan Kekezović	20	1	3	2	3	0	26	3
29	DF	(Serbia and Montenegro) Oliver Đokić	21	0	3	0	1	0	25	0
30	FW	(Serbia and Montenegro) Nenad Mirosavljević	33	15	4	3	4	2	41	20
31	DF	(Serbia and Montenegro) Miroslav Gegić	0	0	0	0	0	0	0	0
Players transferred out during the season
14	FW	(Serbia and Montenegro) Vučina Šćepanović	0	0	0	0	0	0	0	0
15	MF	(Serbia and Montenegro) Milisav Šećković	2	0	1	0	0	0	3	0
20	FW	(Serbia and Montenegro) Saša Branežac	6	1	3	0	1	0	10	1
28	DF	(Serbia and Montenegro) Darko Dreč	3	0	0	0	0	0	3	0

== Competitions ==
=== UEFA Cup ===
15 August 2002 Qualifying round	Bangor City (Wales)	1–0	Sartid	Wrexham, Wales
	Roberts 69'	Report		Stadium: Racecourse Ground; Referee: (Belarus) Sergey Shmolik

29 August 2002 Qualifying round	Sartid	2–0	(Wales) Bangor City	Smederevo, Yugoslavia
	Zečević 14'; Mirosavljević 58'	Report		Stadium: Sartid Stadium; Referee: (Denmark) Knud Stadsgaard

19 September 2002 First round	Ipswich Town (England)	1–1	Sartid	Ipswich, England
	Armstrong 56'	Report	Mirosavljević 32'	Stadium: Portman Road; Referee: (Poland) Tomasz Mikulski

3 October 2002 First round	Sartid	0–1	(England) Ipswich Town	Smederevo, Yugoslavia
		Report	Bent 9' (pen.)	Stadium: Sartid Stadium; Referee: (Spain) Luis Medina Cantalejo
