= 2003–04 FK Sartid Smederevo season =

2003–04 season of FK Sartid Smederevo

Sartid Smederevo
2003–04 season
- Chairman: Čedomir Jevtić
- Manager: Ratko Dostanić (until 23 December); Zvonko Varga (from 6 January)
- Stadium: Sartid Stadium
- First League of Serbia and Montenegro: 5th
- Serbia and Montenegro Cup: Round of 16
- UEFA Cup: First round
- Top goalscorer: League: Nenad Mirosavljević (14); All: Nenad Mirosavljević (18)
Home colours	Away colours

The 2003–04 season was FK Sartid Smederevo's sixth consecutive season in the unified First League of Serbia and Montenegro. The club was tied for first place with Red Star Belgrade after 13 rounds, but finished the season in fifth place.

== Squad statistics ==
No.	Pos.	Name	League		Cup		Europe		Total	
No.	Pos.	Name	Apps	Goals	Apps	Goals	Apps	Goals	Apps	Goals
1	GK	(Serbia and Montenegro) Srđan Dušić	0	0	0	0	0	0	0	0
2	DF	(Serbia and Montenegro) Goran Stojanović	7	0	0	0	0	0	7	0
3	DF	(Serbia and Montenegro) Marko Sočanac	13	0	2	0	2	0	17	0
4	DF	(Serbia and Montenegro) Željko Kovačević	26	3	2	0	4	0	32	3
5	DF	(Serbia and Montenegro) Dragan Spasić	25	1	2	0	4	0	31	1
6	DF	(Serbia and Montenegro) Miroslav Gegić	9	0	2	0	0	0	11	0
7	MF	(Serbia and Montenegro) Goran Bogdanović	17	0	1	0	3	0	21	0
8	DF	(Serbia and Montenegro) Dragan Radosavljević	20	2	0	0	3	0	23	2
9	FW	(Serbia and Montenegro) Milorad Zečević	26	1	1	0	4	1	31	2
10	MF	(Serbia and Montenegro) Saša Kocić	25	2	1	0	4	1	30	3
11	DF	(Serbia and Montenegro) Dragan Paunović	18	2	0	0	3	0	21	2
12	GK	(Serbia and Montenegro) Dragan Žilić	27	0	2	0	4	0	33	0
13	MF	(Serbia and Montenegro) Vladimir Mudrinić	23	2	1	0	4	1	28	3
14	MF	(Serbia and Montenegro) Goran Jovanović	0	0	0	0	0	0	0	0
16	MF	(Serbia and Montenegro) Saša Zorić	22	0	1	0	4	0	27	0
17	DF	(Serbia and Montenegro) Nebojša Savić	10	0	0	0	1	0	11	0
18	FW	(Serbia and Montenegro) Nikola Jevtić	2	0	0	0	0	0	2	0
19	FW	(Serbia and Montenegro) Dejan Živković	19	6	2	1	3	0	24	7
20	FW	(Serbia and Montenegro) Mario Gavrilović	8	0	1	0	0	0	9	0
21	MF	(Serbia and Montenegro) Demir Ramović	5	0	1	0	0	0	6	0
22	GK	(Serbia and Montenegro) Dejan Ranković	4	0	0	0	0	0	4	0
23	MF	(Serbia and Montenegro) Zoran Kulić	8	0	0	0	2	0	10	0
24	FW	(Serbia and Montenegro) Saša Antunović	14	2	0	0	0	0	14	2
25	MF	(Serbia and Montenegro) Ajazdin Nuhi	10	0	0	0	0	0	10	0
26	DF	(Serbia and Montenegro) Ivan Živanović	5	0	2	0	1	0	8	0
27	MF	(Serbia and Montenegro) Dejan Kekezović	23	0	2	0	1	0	26	0
28	DF	(Serbia and Montenegro) Darko Dreč	1	0	0	0	0	0	1	0
29	DF	(Serbia and Montenegro) Oliver Đokić	4	0	0	0	0	0	4	0
30	FW	(Serbia and Montenegro) Nenad Mirosavljević	29	14	2	2	4	2	35	18
Players transferred out during the season
25	FW	(Serbia and Montenegro) Marko Pantelić	15	8	2	0	4	1	21	9
