= Mihajlovac =

Mihajlovac may refer to the following places in Serbia:

- Mihajlovac (Negotin), a village in the municipality of Negotin
- Mihajlovac (Smederevo), a village in the municipality of Smederevo
