= Nenad Mirosavljević =

Serbian footballer

Personal information
- Full name: Nenad Mirosavljević
- Date of birth: 4 September 1977 (age 49)
- Place of birth: Slavonska Požega, SR Croatia, SFR Yugoslavia
- Height: 1.80 m (5 ft 11 in)
- Position: Striker

Senior career*
Years	Team	Apps	(Gls)
1996–2000	Proleter Zrenjanin	102	(27)
2000–2004	Sartid Smederevo	118	(59)
2004–2006	Cádiz	37	(8)
2006–2007	Partizan	10	(1)
2007	→ Vecindario (loan)	19	(3)
2007	Smederevo	12	(4)
2008–2011	APOEL	72	(21)
2011–2012	Olympiakos Nicosia	18	(3)
2012–2013	Napredak Kruševac	60	(35)
2014–2016	Čukarički	61	(11)
Total		509	(172)

International career
2002	FR Yugoslavia B	1	(0)

Managerial career
- 2016: Čukarički (caretaker)
- 2018: Čukarički (caretaker)
- * Club domestic league appearances and goals

Nenad Mirosavljević (Serbian Cyrillic: Ненад Миросављевић; born 4 September 1977) is a Serbian former professional footballer who played as a striker.

During his 20-year-long career, Mirosavljević scored over 100 goals in the national championship of Serbia (including its predecessors) with five clubs, most notably Smederevo (formerly Sartid). He also played abroad for two Spanish and two Cypriot clubs, performing with APOEL in the UEFA Champions League.

== Club career ==
=== Early years ===
Mirosavljević made his senior debut with Proleter Zrenjanin in the 1996–97 campaign, on the same team with future national team players Vladimir Ivić and Zvonimir Vukić. He scored five goals in 19 league appearances during his first season, as the team secured a spot in the 1997 UEFA Intertoto Cup. Throughout his time at the club, Mirosavljević amassed 102 league appearances and scored 27 goals.

=== Sartid Smederevo ===
In September 2000, Mirosavljević was snapped by Sartid Smederevo, making 25 league appearances and scoring 15 goals in his first season at the club. He tallied the same number of league goals in the 2001–02 season, helping the team finish third in the national championship. In September 2002, Mirosavljević scored the opener against Ipswich Town at Portman Road in the first leg of the UEFA Cup first round that ended in a 1–1 draw. However, they were eliminated after a 1–0 home loss. Mirosavljević also helped the club win the Serbia and Montenegro Cup in 2003. He remained at Smederevo during the 2004 UEFA Intertoto Cup, scoring seven goals in four matches, before moving abroad for the first time. In his four-year stay with the Oklopnici, Mirosavljević made a total of 118 league appearances and scored 59 goals, becoming the club's all-time top scorer in the top flight.

=== Cádiz ===
In August 2004, Mirosavljević was transferred to Spanish club Cádiz. He spent two seasons at Cádiz, making 37 league appearances and scoring eight goals for the club. In his second season, while the club played in the top flight, Mirosavljević scored a goal against Barcelona in his team's 3–1 loss.

=== Partizan ===
On 1 August 2006, it was announced that Mirosavljević signed with Partizan on a three-year contract. He was given the number 30 shirt, making his debut for the club in a 2–0 home league win over Banat Zrenjanin on 19 August 2006. Mirosavljević scored his first goal for Partizan in the UEFA Cup group stage against Livorno on 2 November 2006, the game ended 1–1. He netted his first league goal for the club in a 2–1 away win over Banat Zrenjanin on 18 November 2006.

In January 2007, Mirosavljević secured a loan switch to Spanish club Vecindario. He made his debut for Vecindario against his former club Cádiz on 28 January 2007. Until the end of the 2006–07 season, Mirosavljević made 19 league appearances and scored three goals for Vecindario, as the club failed to avoid relegation.

=== Return to Smederevo ===
Subsequently, Mirosavljević had an unassuming brief spell at his former club Smederevo, scoring four goals in 12 league appearances. He also scored once in a 3–0 Serbian Cup victory over Novi Pazar on 26 September 2007.

=== APOEL ===
On 2 January 2008, Mirosavljević moved to Cyprus and signed an 18-month contract with APOEL. He made his competitive debut for the club on 12 January 2008 in a league fixture against APOP Kinyras. On 30 January 2008, Mirosavljević scored his first goals for APOEL, netting a brace in a 3–1 home cup victory over Aris Limassol. He scored a goal in a 4–1 home loss to Schalke 04 on 16 September 2008 in the first leg of the UEFA Cup first round. In December 2008, Mirosavljević extended his contract until the end of the 2010–11 season.

With his three goals, Mirosavljević helped APOEL qualify for the 2009–10 UEFA Champions League. He played five matches during the group stage and scored two goals. On 25 November 2009, Mirosavljević netted the opening goal in a 1–1 home draw versus Atlético Madrid. He also scored a late equalizer in a 2–2 draw with Chelsea at Stamford Bridge on 8 December 2009.

In March 2010, Mirosavljević suffered a ruptured Achilles tendon, causing him to miss the remainder of the 2009–10 season. He nonetheless finished the campaign as the team's top scorer across all competitions with a career-high 21 goals. After several months of recovering, Mirosavljević returned to the field in November 2010, making 10 appearances until the end of the 2010–11 season, without scoring a goal. In May 2011, Mirosavljević left APOEL after three and a half years following the expiration of his contract. In an interview in 2012, Mirosavljević said that his time at APOEL was the heyday of his career.

=== Later years ===
In July 2011, Mirosavljević agreed to join fellow Cypriot First Division club Olympiakos Nicosia on a one-year deal. He played his farewell match for Olympiakos on 28 January 2012, thus leaving Cyprus after four years to return to Serbia.

On 1 February 2012, Mirosavljević signed an 18-month contract with Napredak Kruševac and was immediately named as team captain. He scored a goal on his debut for the club, converting a penalty kick in a 3–0 home victory over Radnički Sombor. In the 2012–13 season, Mirosavljević led the club to promotion to the top flight of Serbian football.

During the 2014 winter transfer window, Mirosavljević moved to Čukarički, making 12 league appearances and scoring five goals until the end of the 2013–14 season. He also helped the club win its first major trophy by taking the 2014–15 Serbian Cup. After the end of the 2015–16 season, Mirosavljević retired from playing professional football.

== International career ==
Mirosavljević played for the national B team of FR Yugoslavia in a friendly match against the Czech Republic national under-21 team in September 2002.

== Post-playing career ==
Immediately upon hanging up his boots, Mirosavljević was named as vice-president of Čukarički. He also served as caretaker manager of their first team twice, in September 2016 and May 2018.

== Career statistics ==
Appearances and goals by club, season and competition
Club	Season	League			Cup		Continental		Other		Total	
Club	Season	Division	Apps	Goals	Apps	Goals	Apps	Goals	Apps	Goals	Apps	Goals
Proleter Zrenjanin	1996–97	First League of FR Yugoslavia	19	5			—		—		19	5
Proleter Zrenjanin	1997–98	First League of FR Yugoslavia	29	3			4	0	—		33	3
Proleter Zrenjanin	1998–99	First League of FR Yugoslavia	19	4			—		—		19	4
Proleter Zrenjanin	1999–2000	First League of FR Yugoslavia	35	15			—		—		35	15
Proleter Zrenjanin	Total		102	27			4	0	—		106	27
Sartid Smederevo	2000–01	First League of FR Yugoslavia	25	15	1	0	—		—		26	15
Sartid Smederevo	2001–02	First League of FR Yugoslavia	30	15	3	3	4	0	—		37	18
Sartid Smederevo	2002–03	First League of Serbia and Montenegro	33	15	4	3	4	2	—		41	20
Sartid Smederevo	2003–04	First League of Serbia and Montenegro	29	14	2	2	4	2	—		35	18
Sartid Smederevo	2004–05	First League of Serbia and Montenegro	1	0	0	0	4	7	—		5	7
Sartid Smederevo	Total		118	59	10	8	16	11	—		144	78
Cádiz	2004–05	Segunda División	25	5	2	0	—		—		27	5
Cádiz	2005–06	La Liga	12	3	6	2	—		—		18	5
Cádiz	Total		37	8	8	2	—		—		45	10
Partizan	2006–07	Serbian SuperLiga	10	1	0	0	5	1	—		15	2
Vecindario (loan)	2006–07	Segunda División	19	3	0	0	—		—		19	3
Smederevo	2007–08	Serbian SuperLiga	12	4	2	1	—		—		14	5
APOEL	2007–08	Cypriot First Division	14	2	7	4	0	0	0	0	21	6
APOEL	2008–09	Cypriot First Division	25	8	4	1	5	2	1	0	35	11
APOEL	2009–10	Cypriot First Division	23	11	3	5	11	5	1	0	38	21
APOEL	2010–11	Cypriot First Division	10	0	0	0	0	0	0	0	10	0
APOEL	Total		72	21	14	10	16	7	2	0	104	38
Olympiakos Nicosia	2011–12	Cypriot First Division	18	3	1	0	—		—		19	3
Napredak Kruševac	2011–12	Serbian First League	16	11	0	0	—		—		16	11
Napredak Kruševac	2012–13	Serbian First League	30	18	0	0	—		—		30	18
Napredak Kruševac	2013–14	Serbian SuperLiga	14	6	2	1	—		—		16	7
Napredak Kruševac	Total		60	35	2	1	—		—		62	36
Čukarički	2013–14	Serbian SuperLiga	12	5	0	0	—		—		12	5
Čukarički	2014–15	Serbian SuperLiga	25	3	5	2	3	1	—		33	6
Čukarički	2015–16	Serbian SuperLiga	24	3	2	2	3	0	—		29	5
Čukarički	Total		61	11	7	4	6	1	—		74	16
Career total			509	172	44	26	47	20	2	0	602	218

== Honours ==
Sartid Smederevo

- Serbia and Montenegro Cup: 2002–03

Cádiz

- Segunda División: 2004–05

APOEL

- Cypriot First Division: 2008–09, 2010–11
- Cypriot Cup: 2007–08
- Cypriot Super Cup: 2008, 2009

Napredak Kruševac

- Serbian First League: 2012–13

Čukarički

- Serbian Cup: 2014–15
