= Boris Vasković =

Serbian footballer

Personal information
- Full name: Boris Vasković
- Date of birth: 14 September 1975 (age 51)
- Place of birth: Sarajevo, SR Bosnia and Herzegovina, SFR Yugoslavia
- Height: 1.73 m (5 ft 8 in)
- Position: Midfielder

Youth career
- Željezničar Sarajevo

Senior career*
Years	Team	Apps	(Gls)
1994–1996	Mačva Šabac	57	(4)
1997–1999	Vojvodina	72	(5)
2000–2003	Sartid Smederevo	92	(4)
2003–2005	OFK Beograd	29	(0)
2005	Mladost Apatin	11	(1)
2006	Mačva Šabac	11	(1)
Total		272	(15)

International career
2002	FR Yugoslavia	3	(0)
- * Club domestic league appearances and goals

Boris Vasković (Serbian Cyrillic: Борис Васковић; born 14 September 1975) is a Serbian former professional footballer who played as a midfielder.

== Club career ==
Vasković joined Vojvodina from Mačva Šabac during the 1997 winter transfer window. He was part of the team that reached the finals of the 1998 UEFA Intertoto Cup, narrowly losing to Werder Bremen 2–1 on aggregate. During the 2000 winter transfer window, Vasković was transferred to Sartid Smederevo, alongside Milorad Mrdak and Vladimir Mudrinić. He helped the club win the Serbia and Montenegro Cup in the 2002–03 season. Despite interest from some European clubs, Vasković signed with OFK Beograd in July 2003, penning a two-year contract. He was a regular member of the team that reached the semi-finals of the 2004 UEFA Intertoto Cup, being eliminated by Atlético Madrid.

== International career ==
In January 2001, Vasković was selected to represent FR Yugoslavia at the Millennium Super Soccer Cup, an unofficial tournament. He appeared in four games in the process, helping the team win the trophy.

In 2002, Vasković made three official appearances for FR Yugoslavia, all of which in friendly matches. He made his debut in a 4–1 home win over Lithuania on 17 April. His last cap came in a 5–0 away defeat to the Czech Republic on 6 September.

== Career statistics ==
=== Club ===
Appearances and goals by club, season and competition
Club	Season	League			Cup		Continental		Total	
Club	Season	Division	Apps	Goals	Apps	Goals	Apps	Goals	Apps	Goals
Vojvodina	1996–97	First League of FR Yugoslavia	13	1			0	0	13	1
Vojvodina	1997–98	First League of FR Yugoslavia	30	3			1	0	31	3
Vojvodina	1998–99	First League of FR Yugoslavia	22	1			7	0	29	1
Vojvodina	1999–2000	First League of FR Yugoslavia	7	0			1	0	8	0
Vojvodina	Total		72	5			9	0	81	5
Sartid Smederevo	1999–2000	First League of FR Yugoslavia	14	0	0	0	—		14	0
Sartid Smederevo	2000–01	First League of FR Yugoslavia	27	1	2	1	—		29	2
Sartid Smederevo	2001–02	First League of FR Yugoslavia	25	2			4	1	29	3
Sartid Smederevo	2002–03	First League of Serbia and Montenegro	26	1	4	1	4	0	34	2
Sartid Smederevo	Total		92	4	6	2	8	1	106	7
OFK Beograd	2003–04	First League of Serbia and Montenegro	25	0	2	0	0	0	27	0
OFK Beograd	2004–05	First League of Serbia and Montenegro	4	0	0	0	6	0	10	0
OFK Beograd	Total		29	0	2	0	6	0	37	0
Career total			193	9	8	2	23	1	224	12

=== International ===
Appearances and goals by national team and year
National team	Year	Apps	Goals
FR Yugoslavia	2002	3	0
Total		3	0

== Honours ==
Sartid Smederevo

- Serbia and Montenegro Cup: 2002–03
