= Kocić =

Kocić (Serbian: Коцић) is a Serbian surname. It may refer to:

- Aleksandar Kocić (born 1969), Serbian former football goalkeeper
- Jovana Kocić (born 1998), Serbian volleyball player
- Milan Kocić (born 1990), Slovenian footballer
- Miloš Kocić (born 1985), Serbian footballer who plays for Toronto FC in Major League Soccer
- Mladen Kocić (born 1988), Serbian futsal player
- Saša Kocić (born 1976), Serbian footballer who currently plays for FK Radnički Kragujevac
