= Marko Pantelić =

Serbian footballer

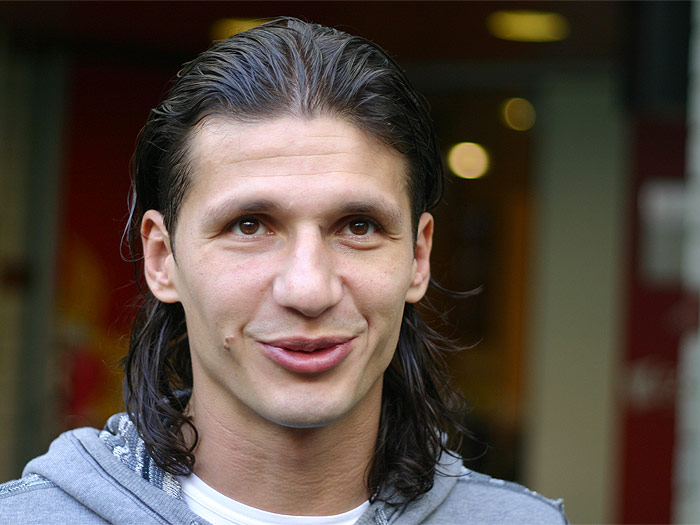
- Pantelić in 2009

Personal information
- Full name: Marko Pantelić
- Date of birth: 15 September 1978 (age 48)
- Place of birth: Belgrade, SFR Yugoslavia
- Height: 1.83 m (6 ft 0 in)
- Position: Striker

Youth career
- Red Star Belgrade
- Iraklis

Senior career*
Years	Team	Apps	(Gls)
1995–1996	Iraklis	8	(4)
1997–1999	Paris Saint-Germain	3	(0)
1998–1999	→ Lausanne (loan)	21	(8)
1999–2000	Celta	0	(0)
1999	→ Sturm Graz (loan)	3	(0)
2000	→ Yverdon (loan)	3	(0)
2002–2003	Obilić	5	(0)
2003–2004	Sartid Smederevo	31	(13)
2004–2005	Red Star Belgrade	44	(26)
2005–2009	Hertha BSC	114	(45)
2009–2010	Ajax	25	(16)
2010–2013	Olympiacos	38	(20)
Total		295	(132)

International career
1996–1997	FR Yugoslavia U18	5	(4)
1996–1999	FR Yugoslavia U21	7	(2)
2003–2011	Serbia (Note: Including three caps for Serbia and Montenegro)	43	(10)
- * Club domestic league appearances and goals

Marko Pantelić (Serbian Cyrillic: Марко Пантелић, pronounced [mâːrko pǎnːtelitɕ]; born 15 September 1978) is a Serbian football agent and former professional footballer who played as a striker. He represented Serbia at the 2010 FIFA World Cup.

== Club career ==
=== Early years ===
As Pantelić was coming up through the Red Star Belgrade youth system, he was offered a job Thessaloniki and went there alone in Greece. Pantelić was still only 16 years old when he signed a professional contract with Iraklis. At 18, Pantelić accepted an offer to sign for French club Paris Saint-Germain and found himself training and playing alongside Raí, Marco Simone, and Leonardo. With only three matches for the club, he moved to Swiss club Lausanne for one season, scoring eight goals in 21 Swiss league matches. Later, Pantelić signed for Spanish club Celta Vigo, but was sent on loan to Sturm Graz in Austria.

After a two-year absence from professional football, Pantelić returned to Serbia and signed with Obilić in summer 2002. He was essentially starting over as many were quick to write him off as yet another prospect whose career was derailed by going abroad too soon. In January 2003, Pantelić moved to Sartid Smederevo. Upon settling in, he quickly established himself as the team's leader, earning them a Serbia and Montenegro Cup title in 2003. However, his playing time in Smederevo did not go unnoticed by Red Star, and Pantelić became the biggest mid-season signing for the latter in January 2004.

=== Hertha BSC ===
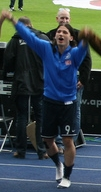
Pantelić with Hertha

After securing a loan move to Hertha for €250,000 on 31 August 2005, the last day of the summer transfer window that year, he went on to score 11 goals in 28 league matches during the 2005–06 season. In April 2006, he signed for Hertha Berlin permanently for an additional €1.5 million fee and soon established himself as one of the most formidable strikers in its squad. Shortly afterwards, Pantelić scored 14 goals from 32 matches in the 2006–07 season and 13 goals for 28 matches in 2007–08 season. In the 2008–09 season, he had limited playing time in favour of Andriy Voronin as Hertha contended for the Bundesliga title. The club fell short, having finished fourth place.

On 17 March 2009, Pantelić denied that he had held talks with any other clubs and refused sign a new contract with Hertha Berlin. He became a free agent in summer 2009.

=== Later career ===
On 1 September 2009, after completing several medical tests, Pantelić signed a one-year contract with Dutch club Ajax, and was given the number 9 shirt. During the season, he scored sixteen goals and delivered nine assists in 25 league matches. Following the season, Pantelić expressed his desire to sign a new contract with Ajax, which the club preferred a one-year contract. He ended up refusing a one-year contract contact with an option of another to focus on his family.

On 21 August 2010, Pantelić joined Olympiacos on a free transfer. He signed a two-year contract worth €1.6 million per year. Pantelić scored his first goal against Panserraikos. On 11 December 2011, Pantelić scored four goals and to secure a victory against Kerkyra.

Pantelić retired from football in 2013. In 2021, he revealed that his reason to retire was due to strained relationship with the Serbian football culture.

== International career ==
Pantelić debuted for the national team in a friendly match against Poland in 2003, In 2010, he was selected in Serbia's squad for the 2010 FIFA World Cup, appearing in group stage matches against Ghana and Australia. He scored his first World Cup goal against Australia in a 2–1 loss. Pantelić also scored three goals in the UEFA Euro 2012 qualifying. He has not featured for his country since their failure to qualify for the corresponding final tournament. Pantelić earned 43 international appearances and ten goals in total.

== Outside football ==
"Pantelić is a miracle of a man. He's the kind of legend that I would rarely ever meet."

— Josip Šimunić, March 2013

Pantelić is widely known in his home country for his alter ego "Pantela", which was created when an anonymous editor of Kurir allegedly began writing columns under the nickname "Pantela" to reflect the real Pantelić's wit and charisma. The "Pantela" meme is often accompanied by an exceptionally exaggerated style of speech in the Belgrade dialect, as defined by the columns. The phenomenon became popular that anonymous fans created profiles on Twitter and Facebook to mimic Pantelić's humorous personality. Pantelić himself confirmed that he is not the owner of either profiles, but admitted to Kurir that he found his alter egos funny and claimed that he would even want to meet the people behind his social networking profiles.

== Career statistics ==
=== Club ===
Appearances and goals by club, season and competition
Club	Season	League			Cup		Europe		Total	
Club	Season	Division	Apps	Goals	Apps	Goals	Apps	Goals	Apps	Goals
Iraklis	1995–96	Alpha Ethniki	8	4			2	0	10	4
Paris Saint-Germain	1997–98	French Division 1	3	0	1	0	0	0	4	0
Lausanne	1998–99	Swiss Super League	21	8			—		21	8
Sturm Graz	1999–2000	Austrian Bundesliga	3	0			2	0	5	0
Yverdon	2000–01	Swiss Super League	3	0			—		3	0
Obilić	2002–03	First League of Serbia and Montenegro	5	0	1	0	0	0	6	0
Sartid Smederevo	2002–03	First League of Serbia and Montenegro	16	5	2	1	0	0	18	6
Sartid Smederevo	2003–04	First League of Serbia and Montenegro	15	8	2	0	4	1	21	9
Sartid Smederevo	Total		31	13	4	1	4	1	39	15
Red Star Belgrade	2003–04	First League of Serbia and Montenegro	12	5	3	1	0	0	15	6
Red Star Belgrade	2004–05	First League of Serbia and Montenegro	29	21	5	1	6	2	40	24
Red Star Belgrade	2005–06	First League of Serbia and Montenegro	3	0	0	0	2	3	5	3
Red Star Belgrade	Total		44	26	8	2	8	5	60	33
Hertha BSC	2005–06	Bundesliga	28	11	2	1	0	0	30	12
Hertha BSC	2006–07	Bundesliga	32	14	4	0	6	2	42	16
Hertha BSC	2007–08	Bundesliga	28	13	1	1	0	0	29	14
Hertha BSC	2008–09	Bundesliga	26	7	2	2	9	4	37	13
Hertha BSC	Total		114	45	9	4	15	6	138	55
Ajax	2009–10	Eredivisie	25	16	7	3	7	2	39	21
Olympiacos	2010–11	Super League Greece	20	9	4	1	0	0	24	10
Olympiacos	2011–12	Super League Greece	12	10	3	6	3	0	18	16
Olympiacos	2012–13	Super League Greece	6	1	2	0	1	0	9	1
Olympiacos	Total		38	20	9	7	4	0	51	27
Career total			295	132	39	17	42	14	376	163

=== International ===
Appearances and goals by national team and year
National team	Year	Apps	Goals
Serbia and Montenegro	2003	1	0
Serbia and Montenegro	2004	2	0
Serbia and Montenegro	2005	0	0
Serbia	2006	5	1
Serbia	2007	7	0
Serbia	2008	7	2
Serbia	2009	6	1
Serbia	2010	7	3
Serbia	2011	8	3
Total		43	10

#	Date	Venue	Opponent	Score	Result	Competition
1	16 August 2006	Městský fotbalový stadion Miroslava Valenty, Uherské Hradiště, Czech Republic	Czech Republic	1–2	1–3	Friendly
2	24 May 2008	Croke Park, Dublin, Republic of Ireland	Republic of Ireland	0–1	1–1	Friendly
3	28 May 2008	Wacker Arena, Burghausen, Altötting, Germany	Russia	1–1	1–2	Friendly
4	10 October 2009	Red Star Stadium, Belgrade, Serbia	Romania	2–0	5–0	2010 FIFA World Cup qualifying
5	3 March 2010	Stade 5 Juillet 1962, Algiers, Algeria	Algeria	0–1	0–3	Friendly
6	5 June 2010	Partizan Stadium, Belgrade, Serbia	Cameroon	4–2	4–3	Friendly
7	23 June 2010	Mbombela Stadium, Nelspruit, South Africa	Australia	1–2	1–2	2010 FIFA World Cup
8	25 March 2011	Red Star Stadium, Belgrade, Serbia	Northern Ireland	1–1	2–1	UEFA Euro 2012 qualifying
9	29 March 2011	A. Le Coq Arena, Tallinn, Estonia	Estonia	0–1	1–1	UEFA Euro 2012 qualifying
10	2 September 2011	Windsor Park, Belfast, Northern Ireland	Northern Ireland	0–1	0–1	UEFA Euro 2012 qualifying

== Honours ==
=== Club ===
Lausanne

- Swiss Cup: 1998–99

Sartid Smederevo

- Serbia and Montenegro Cup: 2002–03

Red Star Belgrade

- First League of Serbia and Montenegro: 2003–04
- Serbia and Montenegro Cup: 2003–04

Hertha BSC

- UEFA Intertoto Cup: 2006

Ajax

- KNVB Cup: 2009–10

Olympiacos

- Super League Greece: 2010–11, 2011–12, 2012–13
- Greek Cup: 2011–12, 2012–13

=== Individual ===
- Best Sportsman of SD Crvena Zvezda: 2004
- First League of Serbia and Montenegro Top Scorer: 2004–05
- Greek Cup Top Goalscorer: 2011–12 (6 goals)
