= Dejan Ranković =

Serbian footballer

Personal information
- Full name: Dejan Ranković
- Date of birth: 25 July 1976 (age 50)
- Place of birth: Smederevo, SFR Yugoslavia
- Height: 1.88 m (6 ft 2 in)
- Position: Goalkeeper

Youth career
- Drugovac

Senior career*
Years	Team	Apps	(Gls)
1996–2012	Smederevo	179	(0)
1997–1998	→ Železničar Smederevo (loan)		
1999–2000	→ Dubočica (loan)		
2001–2002	→ Slavija Sarajevo (loan)		
2012–2014	Sloboda Užice	58	(0)
2014–2016	Sloga Petrovac	49	(0)
Total		286	(0)
- * Club domestic league appearances and goals

Dejan Ranković (Serbian Cyrillic: Дејан Ранковић; born 25 July 1976) is a Serbian former professional footballer who played as a goalkeeper.

== Career ==
=== Smederevo ===
Born in Smederevo, Ranković passed through the youth ranks of the club then called Sartid. He was later loaned to Železničar Smederevo in order to gain experience. Later on, Ranković also spent some time at Dubočica while serving his military duty in Leskovac.

In the summer of 2000, Ranković returned to Sartid and played three games in the 2000–01 season. He also sat on the bench in all four matches in the 2001 UEFA Intertoto Cup. However, with the arrival of Dragan Žilić and Nebojša Milekić, Ranković was sent out on loan to Bosnian side Slavija Sarajevo for the rest of the 2001–02 season.

In the summer of 2002, Ranković made another return to Sartid and became a member of the squad that won the Serbia and Montenegro Cup in the 2002–03 season. He began receiving more playing time after the departure of Žilić in the summer of 2004. Following the club's relegation from the top flight in 2008, Ranković established himself as the team's first-choice goalkeeper and helped them earn promotion back straight away. He continued playing regularly for the side over the next three seasons.

=== Later career ===
In July 2012, Ranković moved to fellow Serbian SuperLiga club Sloboda Užice on a free transfer. He missed just one league game in the 2012–13 season, as the team narrowly fell out of a UEFA Europa League spot. In the following campaign, Ranković again missed just one league match, but failed to help the side avoid relegation from the top flight.

During the 2014–15 and 2015–16 seasons, Ranković played regularly for Serbian First League club Sloga Petrovac.

== Personal life ==
Nicknamed Šnicla (Serbian for "schnitzel"), Ranković is a car mechanic, owning and maintaining an oldsmobile from 1968.

== Career statistics ==
Club	Season	League		Cup		Continental		Total	
Club	Season	Apps	Goals	Apps	Goals	Apps	Goals	Apps	Goals
Sartid Smederevo	1996–97	2	0			—		2	0
Sartid Smederevo	1997–98	0	0			—		0	0
Sartid Smederevo	1998–99	0	0			—		0	0
Sartid Smederevo	1999–2000	0	0			—		0	0
Sartid Smederevo	2000–01	3	0	0	0	—		3	0
Sartid Smederevo	2001–02	0	0	0	0	0	0	0	0
Sartid Smederevo	2002–03	2	0			0	0	2	0
Sartid Smederevo	2003–04	4	0			0	0	4	0
Smederevo	2004–05	10	0			1	0	11	0
Smederevo	2005–06	13	0			2	0	15	0
Smederevo	2006–07	22	0			—		22	0
Smederevo	2007–08	15	0	1	0	—		16	0
Smederevo	2008–09	30	0	3	0	—		33	0
Smederevo	2009–10	23	0			—		23	0
Smederevo	2010–11	28	0			—		28	0
Smederevo	2011–12	27	0	2	0	—		29	0
Smederevo	Total	179	0	6	0	3	0	188	0
Sloboda Užice	2012–13	29	0	1	0	—		30	0
Sloboda Užice	2013–14	29	0	3	0	—		32	0
Sloboda Užice	Total	58	0	4	0	—		62	0
Sloga Petrovac	2014–15	26	0	2	0	—		28	0
Sloga Petrovac	2015–16	23	0	1	0	—		24	0
Sloga Petrovac	Total	49	0	3	0	—		52	0
Career total		286	0	13	0	3	0	302	0

== Honours ==
Sartid Smederevo

- Serbia and Montenegro Cup: 2002–03
