= Milenko Kiković =

Serbian football manager and player

Personal information
- Date of birth: 19 October 1954 (age 72)
- Place of birth: Sjenica, FPR Yugoslavia
- Position: Forward

Youth career
- Sloga Sjenica

Senior career*
Years	Team	Apps	(Gls)
- Sloga Sjenica
- Zlatar Nova Varoš
1977–1978	Sloboda Užice		
1979–1982	Rad	58	(15)
1983–1985	Obilić		
- Čukarički
- Mladenovac

Managerial career
- 1993–1994: Obilić
- 1995–1997: Rad
- 1997–1998: Bor
- 1998–1999: Čukarički
- 2000: Sartid Smederevo
- 2001–2002: Radnički Obrenovac
- 2003: Sartid Smederevo
- 2004: Smederevo
- 2006: BASK
- 2006: Radnički Niš
- 2010–2011: BSK Borča
- 2014–2015: Sloboda Užice
- * Club domestic league appearances and goals

Milenko Kiković (Serbian Cyrillic: Миленко Киковић; born 19 October 1954) is a Serbian former football manager and player.

== Playing career ==
During the late 1970s and early 1980s, Kiković played for Rad in the Yugoslav Second League, scoring 15 times in 58 appearances.

== Managerial career ==
After hanging up his boots, Kiković served as manager of numerous clubs in his homeland, most notably winning the Serbia and Montenegro Cup with Sartid Smederevo in the 2002–03 season. He was also manager of BASK, Radnički Niš, BSK Borča, and lastly Sloboda Užice (September 2014–April 2015).

== Honours ==
Sartid Smederevo

- Serbia and Montenegro Cup: 2002–03
