= Milisav Šećković =

Montenegrin footballer

Personal information
- Date of birth: 22 May 1973 (age 53)
- Place of birth: Nikšić, SR Montenegro, SFR Yugoslavia
- Position: Midfielder

Senior career*
Years	Team	Apps	(Gls)
1996–1998	Sutjeska Nikšić	49	(11)
1998–2000	Vojvodina	7	(0)
2000–2001	OFK Beograd	12	(2)
2001–2002	Inter Bratislava		
2002–2003	Sartid Smederevo	2	(0)
2003	→ UTA Arad (loan)	5	(0)
2004–2005	Modriča	17	(5)
Total		92	(18)
- * Club domestic league appearances and goals

Milisav Šećković (Montenegrin Cyrillic: Милисав Шећковић; born 22 May 1973) is a Montenegrin former professional footballer who played as a midfielder.

== Career ==
After starting out at his hometown club Sutjeska Nikšić, Šećković spent two seasons with Vojvodina (1998–2000). He also played abroad in Slovakia (Inter Bratislava) and Romania (UTA Arad).
