= Dragan Žilić =

Serbian footballer

Personal information
- Date of birth: 14 December 1974 (age 51)
- Place of birth: Kikinda, SR Serbia, SFR Yugoslavia
- Height: 1.97 m (6 ft 6 in)
- Position: Goalkeeper

Youth career
- 1985–1992: OFK Kikinda

Senior career*
Years	Team	Apps	(Gls)
1992–1996	OFK Kikinda	70	(0)
1996–2000	Vojvodina	49	(0)
2000–2001	CSKA Sofia	1	(0)
2001–2005	Sartid Smederevo	112	(0)
2005–2008	Rijeka	79	(0)
2009–2010	Gorica	19	(0)
2015	Gençlerbirliği Homburg	10	(0)
2015–2017	SpVgg Einöd-Ingweiler	33	(0)
2017	SV Beeden	16	(0)
2018	Gençlerbirliği Homburg	28	(0)
2019	ASV Kleinottweiler	11	(0)
2019–2021	SV Schwarzenbach	23	(0)
2022–2023	SG Knopp/Wiesbach	9	(0)
2023–2024	FC Bierbach	0	(0)
2024	Gençlerbirliği Homburg	15	(0)
2025	FC Rastpfuhl	0	(0)

International career
1998–2003	Serbia and Montenegro	8	(0)

Managerial career
- 2015–2017: SpVgg Einöd-Ingweiler (player-manager)
- 2018: Gençlerbirliği Homburg (player-manager)
- * Club domestic league appearances and goals

Dragan Žilić (Serbian Cyrillic: Драган Жилић; born 14 December 1974) is a Serbian former professional footballer who played as a goalkeeper.

== Club career ==
Žilić joined his hometown club OFK Kikinda as a trainee in 1985. He made his senior debut in the 1992–93 First League of FR Yugoslavia, as the team finished in the lower half of the standings. In the summer of 1996, Žilić was transferred to Vojvodina. He was a regular member of the team that reached the 1998 UEFA Intertoto Cup finals, losing 2–1 on aggregate to Werder Bremen.

In June 2000, Žilić moved abroad to Bulgaria and signed with CSKA Sofia on a three-year contract. He left the club by mutual agreement in February 2001, having played just two official games for the team. In July 2001, Žilić returned to his homeland and joined ambitious Sartid Smederevo. He spent four seasons with the Oklopnici, winning the Serbia and Montenegro Cup in 2003.

In July 2005, Žilić completed a controversial move to Croatian side Rijeka. The transfer caused a minor sensation in the region as it marked the first occasion that a Serbian-born player joined a Croatian club after the Yugoslav Wars. Despite being exposed to severe verbal abuse by the nationalist supporters of Rijeka, Žilić immediately established himself as the first-choice goalkeeper and gradually earned the support of fans with his consistent performances. He played an important role in helping them win the 2005–06 Croatian Cup. On 29 November 2006, Žilić scored a 92nd-minute header against Konavljanin that pushed Rijeka into the 2006–07 Croatian Cup semi-finals. He would lose his place in the first team by the fall of 2008, being demoted to as low as training with the youth team. In the 2009 winter transfer window, Žilić signed with Slovenian club Gorica on a free transfer. He retired from professional football after the 2009–10 season.

In early 2015, at the age of 40, Žilić came out of retirement to play for German amateur club Gençlerbirliği Homburg in the Bezirksliga. He became player-manager of Landesliga club SpVgg Einöd-Ingweiler in October of the same year.

== International career ==
Žilić made his international debut for FR Yugoslavia in a 1–1 away friendly draw against Brazil on 23 September 1998. He came on as a second-half substitute for Ivica Kralj and kept a clean sheet in the process. After nearly four years of absence, Žilić returned to the squad in a 2–1 friendly win over Mexico at Bank One Ballpark on 13 February 2002. He earned a total of eight caps for the national team between 1998 and 2003.

== Post-playing career ==
Following his initial retirement in 2010, Žilić served as president of OFK Kikinda.

== Career statistics ==
=== Club ===
Appearances and goals by club, season and competition
Club	Season	League			Cup		Continental		Total	
Club	Season	Division	Apps	Goals	Apps	Goals	Apps	Goals	Apps	Goals
OFK Kikinda	1992–93	First League of FR Yugoslavia	2	0			—		2	0
OFK Kikinda	1993–94	First League of FR Yugoslavia	8	0			—		8	0
OFK Kikinda	1994–95	Second League of FR Yugoslavia	30	0			—		30	0
OFK Kikinda	1995–96	Second League of FR Yugoslavia	30	0			—		30	0
OFK Kikinda	Total		70	0			—		70	0
Vojvodina	1996–97	First League of FR Yugoslavia	4	0			4	0	8	0
Vojvodina	1997–98	First League of FR Yugoslavia	13	0			0	0	13	0
Vojvodina	1998–99	First League of FR Yugoslavia	23	0			10	0	33	0
Vojvodina	1999–2000	First League of FR Yugoslavia	9	0			4	0	13	0
Vojvodina	Total		49	0			18	0	67	0
CSKA Sofia	2000–01	Bulgarian First League	1	0	0	0	1	0	2	0
Sartid Smederevo	2001–02	First League of Serbia and Montenegro	33	0			0	0	33	0
Sartid Smederevo	2002–03	First League of Serbia and Montenegro	33	0	5	0	4	0	42	0
Sartid Smederevo	2003–04	First League of Serbia and Montenegro	27	0	2	0	4	0	33	0
Sartid Smederevo	2004–05	First League of Serbia and Montenegro	19	0			3	0	22	0
Sartid Smederevo	Total		112	0	7	0	11	0	130	0
Rijeka	2005–06	Croatian First League	29	0	7	0	2	0	38	0
Rijeka	2006–07	Croatian First League	27	0	6	1	2	0	35	1
Rijeka	2007–08	Croatian First League	23	0	1	0	—		24	0
Rijeka	Total		79	0	14	1	4	0	97	1
Gorica	2008–09	Slovenian First League	3	0	0	0	0	0	3	0
Gorica	2009–10	Slovenian First League	16	0	0	0	0	0	16	0
Gorica	Total		19	0	0	0	0	0	19	0
Gençlerbirliği Homburg	2014–15	Bezirksliga	2	0	—		—		2	0
Gençlerbirliği Homburg	2015–16	Landesliga	8	0	—		—		8	0
Gençlerbirliği Homburg	Total		10	0	—		—		10	0
SpVgg Einöd-Ingweiler	2015–16	Landesliga	13	0	—		—		13	0
SpVgg Einöd-Ingweiler	2016–17	Landesliga	20	0	—		—		20	0
SpVgg Einöd-Ingweiler	Total		33	0	—		—		33	0
SV Beeden	2017–18	Landesliga	16	0	—		—		16	0
Gençlerbirliği Homburg	2017–18	Landesliga	11	0	—		—		11	0
Gençlerbirliği Homburg	2018–19	Landesliga	17	0	—		—		17	0
Gençlerbirliği Homburg	Total		28	0	—		—		28	0
ASV Kleinottweiler	2018–19	Landesliga	11	0	—		—		11	0
SV Schwarzenbach	2019–20	Verbandsliga	14	0	—		—		14	0
SV Schwarzenbach	2020–21	Verbandsliga	2	0	—		—		2	0
SV Schwarzenbach	2021–22	Verbandsliga	7	0	—		—		7	0
SV Schwarzenbach	Total		23	0	—		—		23	0
SG Knopp/Wiesbach	2021–22	Bezirksliga	5	0	—		—		5	0
SG Knopp/Wiesbach	2022–23	Bezirksliga	4	0	—		—		4	0
SG Knopp/Wiesbach	Total		9	0	—		—		9	0
FC Bierbach	2023–24	Landesliga	0	0	—		—		0	0
Gençlerbirliği Homburg	2024–25	Bezirksliga	15	0	—		—		15	0
Career total			475	0	21	1	34	0	530	1

=== International ===
Appearances and goals by national team and year
National team	Year	Apps	Goals
FR Yugoslavia	1998	1	0
FR Yugoslavia	1999	0	0
FR Yugoslavia	2000	0	0
FR Yugoslavia	2001	0	0
FR Yugoslavia	2002	3	0
Serbia and Montenegro	2003	4	0
Total		8	0

== Honours ==
Sartid Smederevo

- Serbia and Montenegro Cup: 2002–03

Rijeka

- Croatian Cup: 2005–06
