= Milorad Zečević =

Serbian football manager and player (born 1972)

Personal information
- Full name: Milorad Zečević
- Date of birth: 26 October 1972 (age 54)
- Place of birth: Paris, France
- Height: 1.81 m (5 ft 11 in)
- Position: Forward

Youth career
- Paris FC

Senior career*
Years	Team	Apps	(Gls)
- Srem Sremski Mihaljevci
- Sloven Ruma
1996–1997	Loznica	36	(6)
1998	FF Jaro	18	(3)
1999–2000	Proleter Zrenjanin	39	(8)
2000–2010	Smederevo	240	(39)
Total		333	(56)

Managerial career
- 2012: Kolonija Kovin
- 2013: Vršac
- 2016: Šumadija Aranđelovac
- 2016–2018: Smederevo 1924
- 2021: Radnički Kovin
- 2021: RSK Rabrovo
- * Club domestic league appearances and goals

Milorad Zečević (Serbian Cyrillic: Милорад Зечевић; born 26 October 1972) is a Serbian football manager and former player.

== Playing career ==
Born in Paris, France, Zečević began playing football at Paris FC. He later moved to his parents' homeland and started his career at lower league clubs, before joining Loznica in 1996. In 1998, Zečević played for FF Jaro in Finland, making 18 appearances and scoring three goals in the Veikkausliiga. He subsequently returned to FR Yugoslavia and signed with Proleter Zrenjanin.

In the summer of 2000, Zečević signed with Sartid Smederevo. He spent the next 10 seasons with the Oklopnici, making over 200 appearances in the top flight of Serbian football. In May 2003, Zečević was a member of the team that won the Serbia and Montenegro Cup.

== Managerial career ==
Between 2016 and 2018, Zečević served as manager of Smederevo 1924.

== Career statistics ==
Club	Season	League		Cup		Continental		Total	
Club	Season	Apps	Goals	Apps	Goals	Apps	Goals	Apps	Goals
Loznica	1996–97	31	6			—		31	6
Loznica	1997–98	5	0			—		5	0
Loznica	Total	36	6			—		36	6
FF Jaro	1998	18	3			—		18	3
Proleter Zrenjanin	1998–99	6	0			—		6	0
Proleter Zrenjanin	1999–2000	33	8			—		33	8
Proleter Zrenjanin	Total	39	8			—		39	8
Smederevo	2000–01	28	5	1	1	—		29	6
Smederevo	2001–02	30	4	4	1	3	0	37	5
Smederevo	2002–03	26	8			4	1	30	9
Smederevo	2003–04	26	1			4	1	30	2
Smederevo	2004–05	25	4			4	3	29	7
Smederevo	2005–06	26	6			1	0	27	6
Smederevo	2006–07	27	7			—		27	7
Smederevo	2007–08	26	2	0	0	—		26	2
Smederevo	2008–09	17	1			—		17	1
Smederevo	2009–10	9	1			—		9	1
Smederevo	Total	240	39	5	2	16	5	261	46
Career total		333	56	5	2	16	5	354	63

== Honours ==
Sartid Smederevo

- Serbia and Montenegro Cup: 2002–03
