= Dragan Radosavljević =

Serbian footballer

Personal information
- Full name: Dragan Radosavljević
- Date of birth: 24 October 1982 (age 44)
- Place of birth: Smederevo, SFR Yugoslavia
- Height: 1.74 m (5 ft 9 in)
- Position: Left-back

Youth career
- 1993–2000: Sartid Smederevo

Senior career*
Years	Team	Apps	(Gls)
2000–2006	Smederevo	124	(10)
2006–2008	Partizan	7	(0)
2007	→ Bežanija (loan)	3	(0)
2007–2008	→ Smederevo (loan)	26	(1)
2008–2009	Banat Zrenjanin	41	(1)
2010	Sevojno	13	(0)
2010–2011	Sloboda Užice	26	(0)
2011–2012	Aris Limassol	19	(0)
2012	Radnički Kragujevac	7	(0)
2013	Smederevo	7	(0)
2013	Sopot	5	(1)
Total		278	(13)

International career
2001	FR Yugoslavia U18	2	(1)
2001	FR Yugoslavia U21	2	(0)
2002	FR Yugoslavia B	1	(0)
- * Club domestic league appearances and goals

Dragan Radosavljević (Serbian Cyrillic: Драган Радосављевић; born 24 October 1982) is a Serbian former professional footballer who played as a left-back.

== Club career ==
Born in Smederevo, Radosavljević came through the youth ranks at his hometown club Sartid Smederevo, before breaking into the first team in 2000. He immediately became an irreplaceable part of the team on the left side of the pitch. His impressive displays caught the attention of numerous domestic and foreign clubs, including bids from Ajax and Dynamo Kyiv, but the transfer never went through. In total, Radosavljević played six seasons for the club, making 124 league appearances and scoring 10 goals. He also represented the club in UEFA competitions, making 14 appearances while scoring once.

In June 2006, Radosavljević signed a four-year contract with Partizan. He spent six months at the club, before being loaned to Bežanija in February 2007. In the following summer, Radosavljević was sent on a season-long loan to his parent club Smederevo.

Between 2008 and 2011, Radosavljević went on to play for Banat Zrenjanin, Sevojno and Sloboda Užice, but without notable achievements.

After spending one season with Cypriot club Aris Limassol, Radosavljević moved back to his homeland and signed with Radnički Kragujevac in July 2012. He stayed there for only six months, before again returning to Smederevo.

== International career ==
Radosavljević represented FR Yugoslavia at Under-18 and Under-21 level. He also played for the national B team in a friendly match against the Czech Republic national under-21 team in September 2002.

== Statistics ==
Club	Season	League		Cup		Continental		Total	
Club	Season	Apps	Goals	Apps	Goals	Apps	Goals	Apps	Goals
Smederevo	2000–01	23	1	1	0	0	0	24	1
Smederevo	2001–02	26	2	-	-	4	0	30	2
Smederevo	2002–03	11	2	-	-	3	0	14	2
Smederevo	2003–04	20	2	0	0	3	0	23	2
Smederevo	2004–05	21	1	3	1	4	1	28	3
Smederevo	2005–06	23	2	2	0	0	0	25	2
Smederevo	Total	124	10	6	1	14	1	144	12

== Honours ==
Sartid Smederevo

- Serbia and Montenegro Cup: 2002–03
