= Marko Sočanac =

Serbian footballer

Personal information
- Full name: Marko Sočanac
- Date of birth: 4 July 1978 (age 48)
- Place of birth: Raška, SFR Yugoslavia
- Height: 1.84 m (6 ft 0 in)
- Position: Defender

Youth career
- Bane

Senior career*
Years	Team	Apps	(Gls)
1996–2000	Bane		
2000–2008	Smederevo	166	(2)
2009	Qingdao Jonoon	20	(0)
2010	Mladi Radnik	15	(0)
2011	Novi Pazar	14	(1)
2011–2012	Bane		
2013	Seljak Mihajlovac		
2013	Sopot		
2014	Seljak Mihajlovac		
2014–2016	Smederevo 1924		
2018–2019	Partizan Gaj		
Total		215	(3)
- * Club domestic league appearances and goals

Marko Sočanac (Serbian Cyrillic: Марко Сочанац; born 4 July 1978) is a Serbian former professional footballer who played as a defender.

== Career ==
After starting out at his hometown club Bane, Sočanac was transferred to Sartid Smederevo in June 2000. He spent the next eight years with the Oklopnici, helping the side win the Serbia and Montenegro Cup in the 2002–03 season. After leaving Smederevo, Sočanac moved abroad and joined Chinese Super League club Qingdao Jonoon, making 20 appearances in the 2009 CSL season.

== Career statistics ==
Club	Season	League		Cup		Continental		Total	
Club	Season	Apps	Goals	Apps	Goals	Apps	Goals	Apps	Goals
Sartid Smederevo	2000–01	26	1	2	0	—		28	1
Sartid Smederevo	2001–02	30	0			4	0	34	0
Sartid Smederevo	2002–03	25	0			4	0	29	0
Sartid Smederevo	2003–04	13	0			2	0	15	0
Smederevo	2004–05	21	0			4	0	25	0
Smederevo	2005–06	12	0			1	0	13	0
Smederevo	2006–07	16	1			—		16	1
Smederevo	2007–08	23	0	1	0	—		24	0
Smederevo	Total	166	2	3	0	15	0	184	2

== Honours ==
Sartid Smederevo

- Serbia and Montenegro Cup: 2002–03
