= Nebojša Savić =

Serbian footballer

Personal information
- Date of birth: 4 January 1980 (age 46)
- Place of birth: Loznica, SFR Yugoslavia
- Height: 1.87 m (6 ft 2 in)
- Position: Defender

Senior career*
Years	Team	Apps	(Gls)
1999–2001	Loznica		
2001	Sloga Lipnički Šor		
2001–2006	Smederevo	65	(0)
2006–2009	Čukarički	60	(1)
2009–2010	Zemun	25	(0)
2010–2011	BASK	32	(0)
2011–2012	Radnički Obrenovac	27	(3)
2012–2014	Timok	48	(0)
2014–2015	Loznica	36	(1)
2016–2018	Lokomotiva Beograd		
- * Club domestic league appearances and goals

Nebojša Savić (Serbian Cyrillic: Небојша Савић; born 4 January 1980) is a Serbian former professional footballer who played as a defender.
