= Saša Kocić =

Serbian football manager and player

Personal information
- Full name: Saša Kocić
- Date of birth: 10 June 1976 (age 50)
- Place of birth: Kučevo, SR Serbia, SFR Yugoslavia
- Height: 1.80 m (5 ft 11 in)
- Position: Midfielder

Team information
- Current team: Zvižd (manager)

Youth career
- Zvižd

Senior career*
Years	Team	Apps	(Gls)
1995–2001	Sartid Smederevo	125	(11)
2001	Red Star Belgrade	4	(0)
2002–2006	Smederevo	99	(7)
2006	Bežanija	8	(0)
2007–2008	Borac Čačak	33	(3)
2009	Radnički Kragujevac	4	(0)
2010–2011	SCU Ardagger	38	(5)
Total		311	(26)

Managerial career
- 2017–2018: RSK Rabrovo
- 2020–: Zvižd
- * Club domestic league appearances and goals

Saša Kocić (Serbian Cyrillic: Саша Коцић; born 10 June 1976) is a Serbian football manager and former player.

== Playing career ==
A midfielder, Kocić spent the majority of his career at Smederevo (formerly Sartid), amassing over 200 league appearances in two spells between 1995 and 2006. He also helped them win the Serbia and Montenegro Cup in the 2002–03 season.

== Managerial career ==
In October 2020, Kocić was appointed as manager of his parent club Zvižd.

== Career statistics ==
Club	Season	League	
Club	Season	Apps	Goals
Sartid Smederevo	1995–96		
Sartid Smederevo	1996–97	31	4
Sartid Smederevo	1997–98	23	1
Sartid Smederevo	1998–99	20	2
Sartid Smederevo	1999–2000	36	1
Sartid Smederevo	2000–01	15	3
Sartid Smederevo	Total	125	11
Red Star Belgrade	2001–02	4	0
Smederevo	2002–03	23	1
Smederevo	2003–04	25	2
Smederevo	2004–05	28	4
Smederevo	2005–06	22	0
Smederevo	2006–07	1	0
Smederevo	Total	99	7
Bežanija	2006–07	8	0
Borac Čačak	2007–08	22	1
Borac Čačak	2008–09	11	2
Borac Čačak	Total	33	3
Radnički Kragujevac	2008–09	4	0
SCU Ardagger	2009–10	14	2
SCU Ardagger	2010–11	24	3
SCU Ardagger	Total	38	5
Career total		311	26

== Honours ==
Sartid Smederevo

- Serbia and Montenegro Cup: 2002–03
