= Smederevo Stadium =

Football stadium in Smederevo, Serbia

- Stadion kraj Stare železare Tvrđava
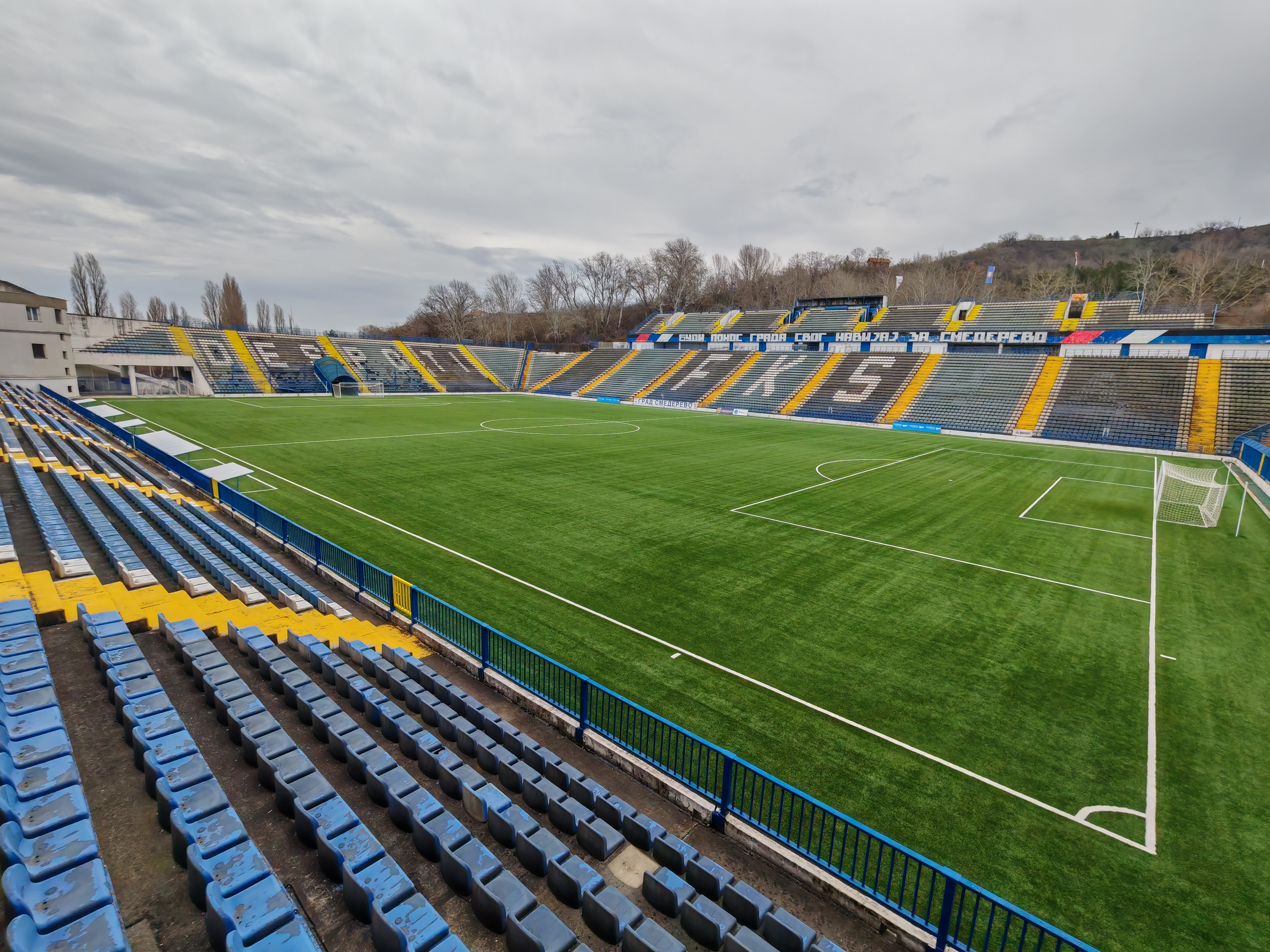
- View of Smederevo Stadium from the angle of west stand
- Interactive map of Smederevo Stadium
- Full name: Smederevo City Stadium
- Former names: Sartid Stadium
- Location: Smederevo, Serbia
- Coordinates: 44°39′38.28″N 20°54′6.24″E
- Owner: FK Smederevo 1924
- Operator: FK Smederevo 1924
- Capacity: 16,376
- Surface: Artificial grass (cork)
- Scoreboard: LED
- Field size: 105 x 68 m

Construction
- Built: 1930; 96 years ago
- Expanded: 1993–94, 1996, 1998, 1999, 2000

Tenant
- FK Smederevo 1924

Smederevo City Stadium (Serbian: Градски Стадион Смедерево / Gradski Stadion Smederevo), colloquially known as the Stadion kraj Stare železare or Tvrđava, is a football stadium in Smederevo, Serbia. It is used mostly for football matches and is the home of FK Smederevo 1924. The stadium has a seating capacity for 17,200 spectators.

== History ==
The stadium was opened back in 1930, and it underwent a series of expansions during the 1990-s, when the local club FK Sartid Smederevo played in the top-tier national league. The last major reconstruction happened in 2000, and since then it has its current appearance. The venue hosted a 2009 European Cup rugby league match, when Serbia played Wales.

In late August 2012, an unidentified virus infected the grass at the stadium and forced FK Smederevo to play its fixtures outside of the stadium until the grass was changed.

== Gallery ==
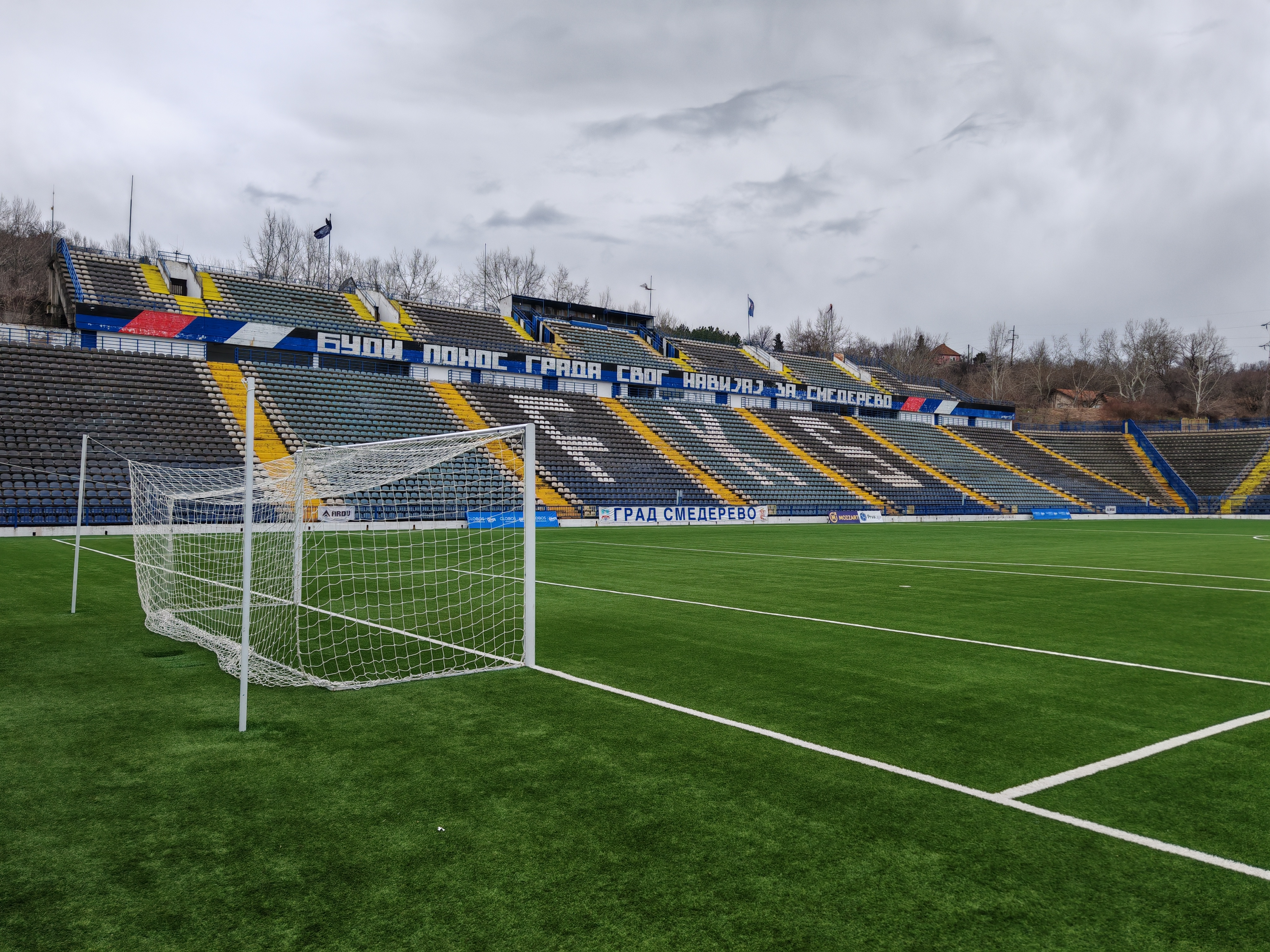
View on the east stand of Smederevo Stadium from behind the goal post, February 2026

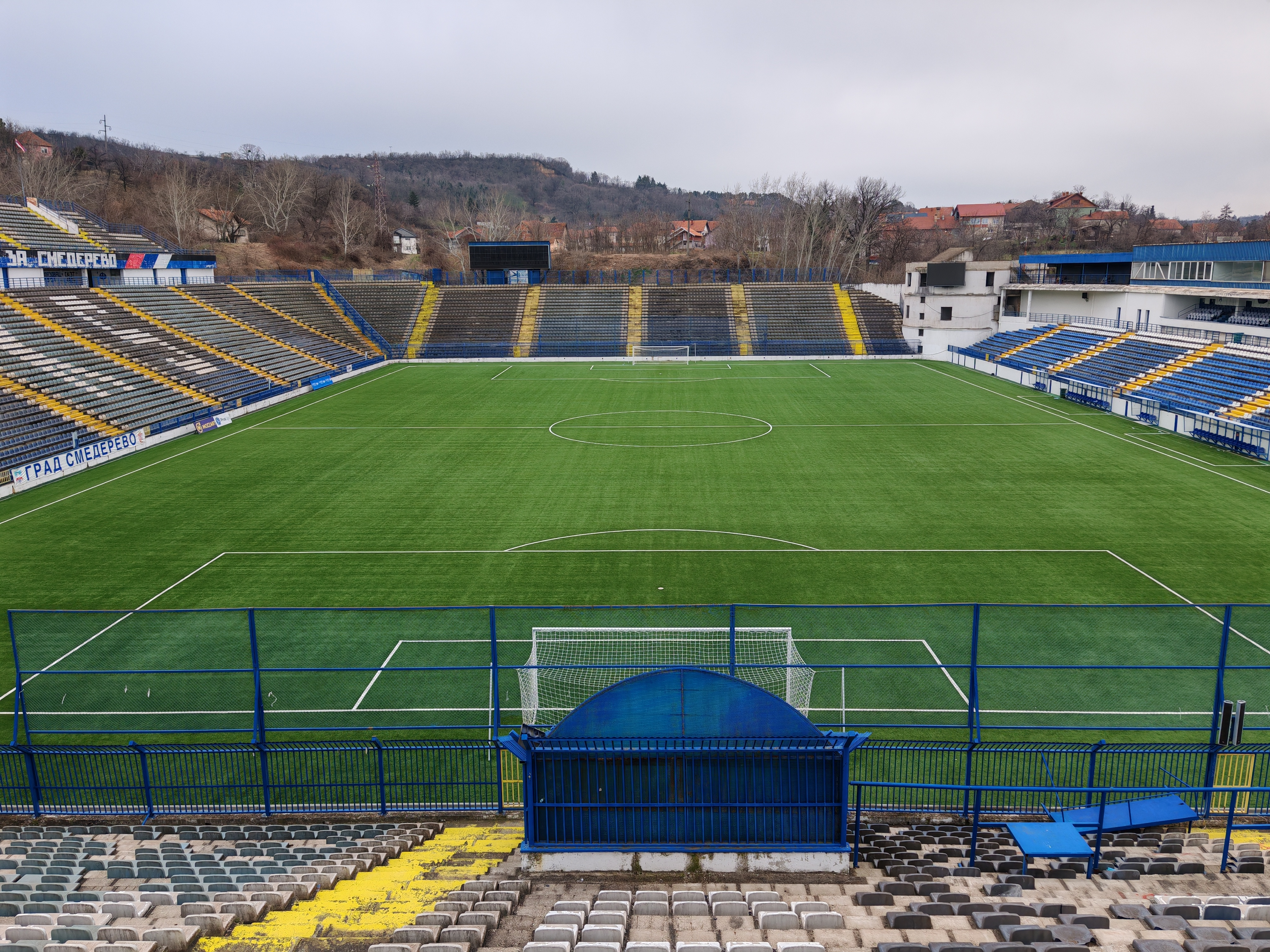
View on the football pitch of Smederevo Stadium from the top of north stand

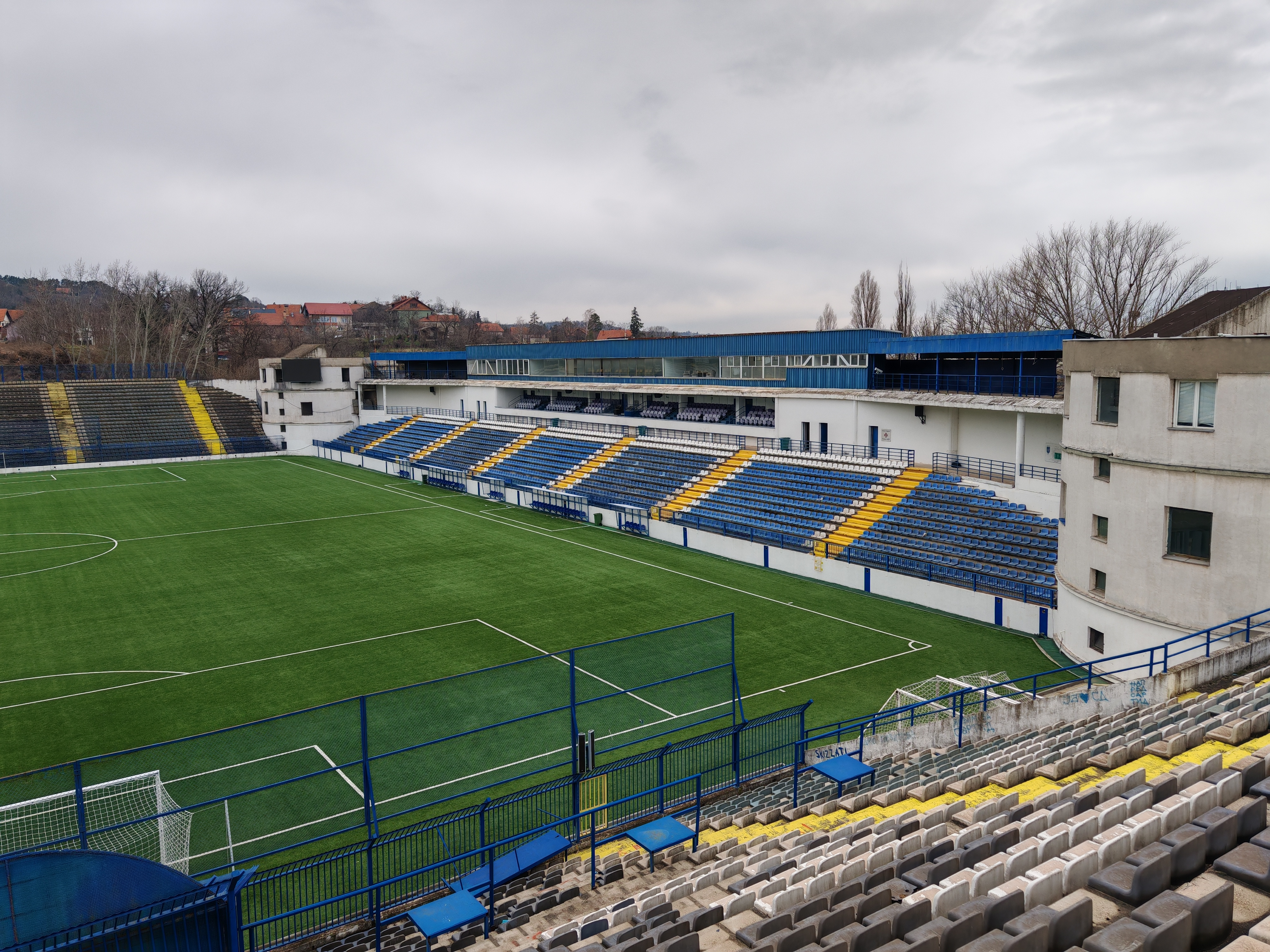
View on the west stand of Smederevo Stadium from the top of north stand

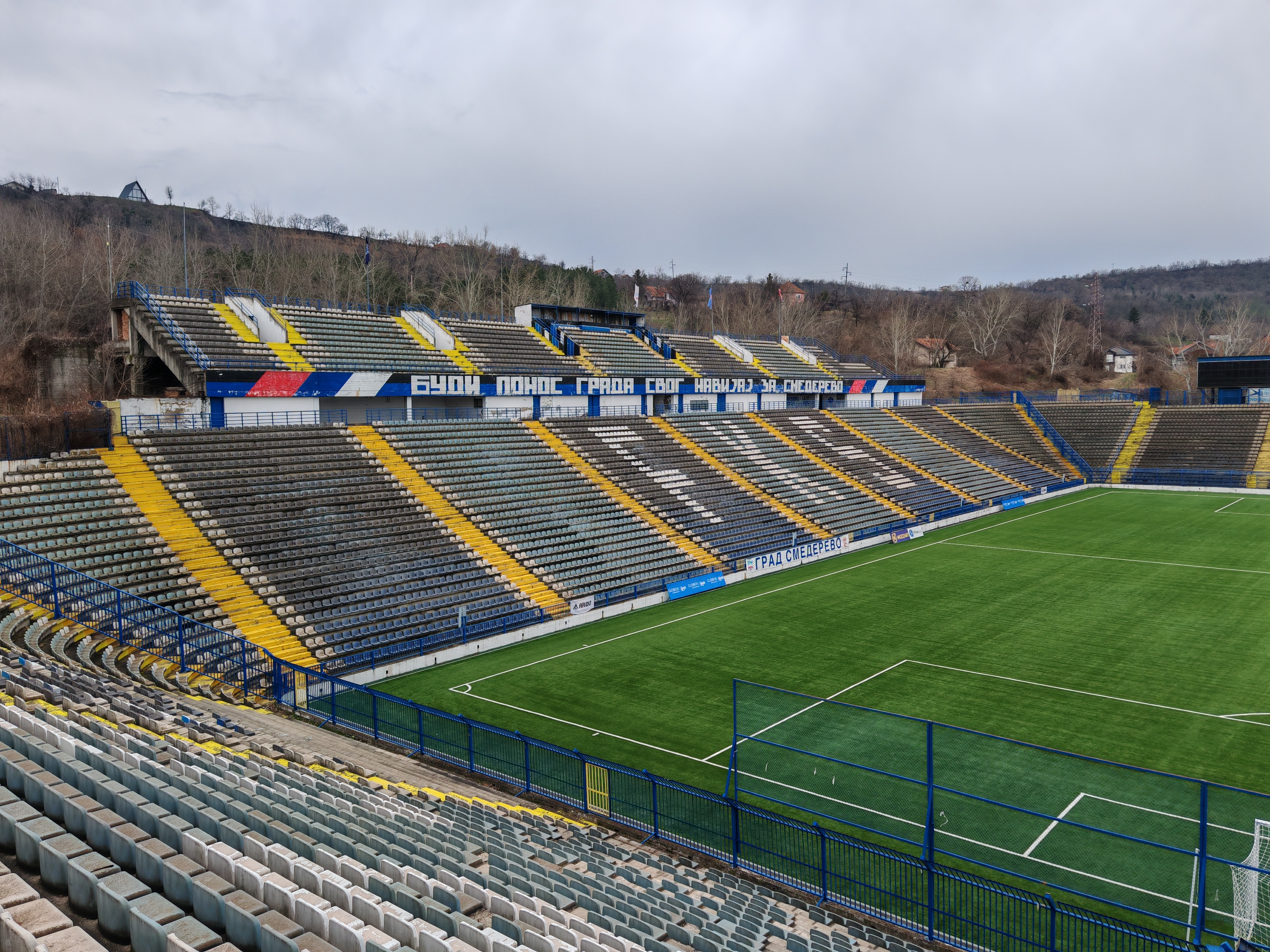
View on the east stand from the top of north stand

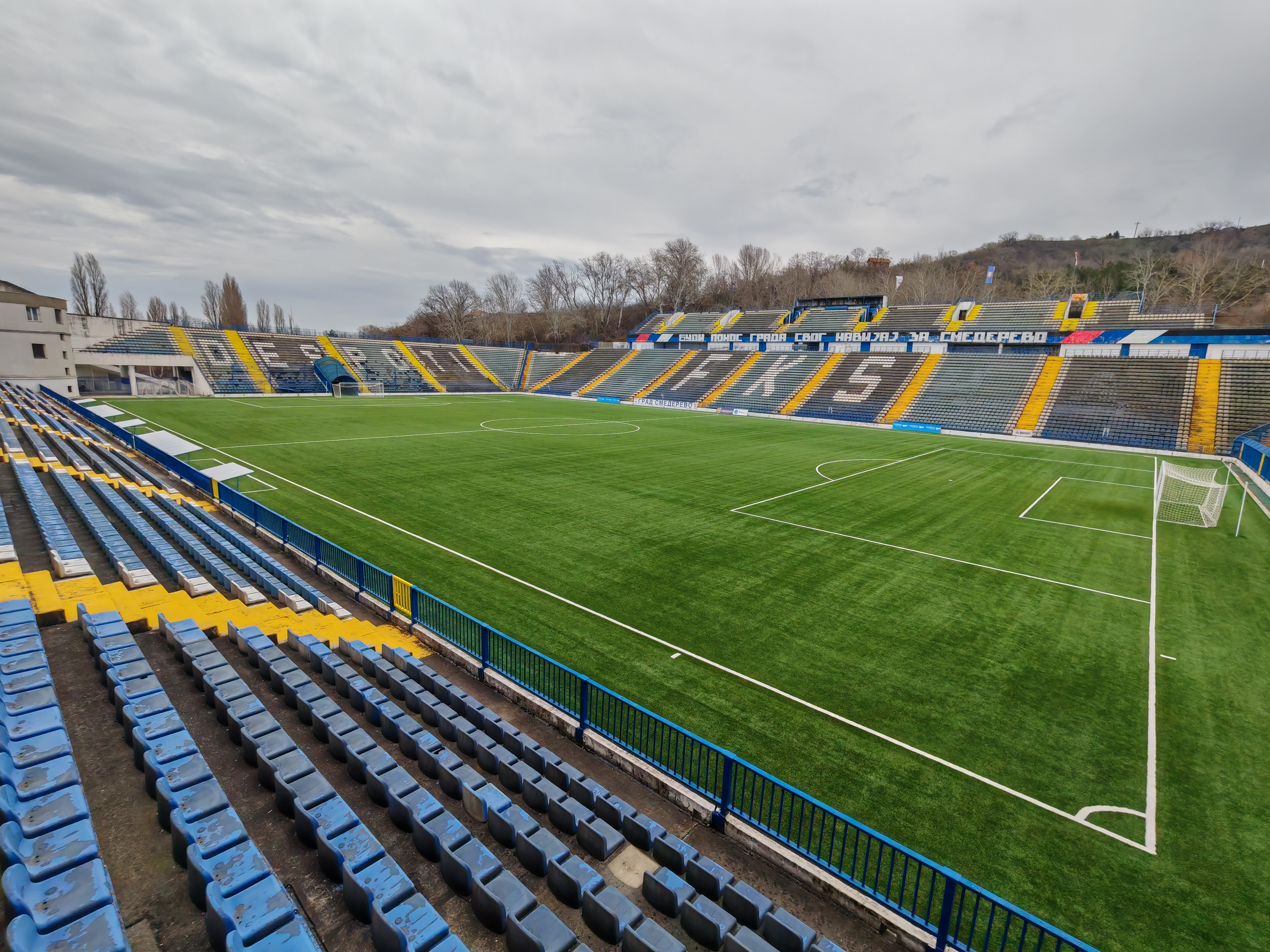
View of Smederevo Stadium from the angle of west stand.jpg

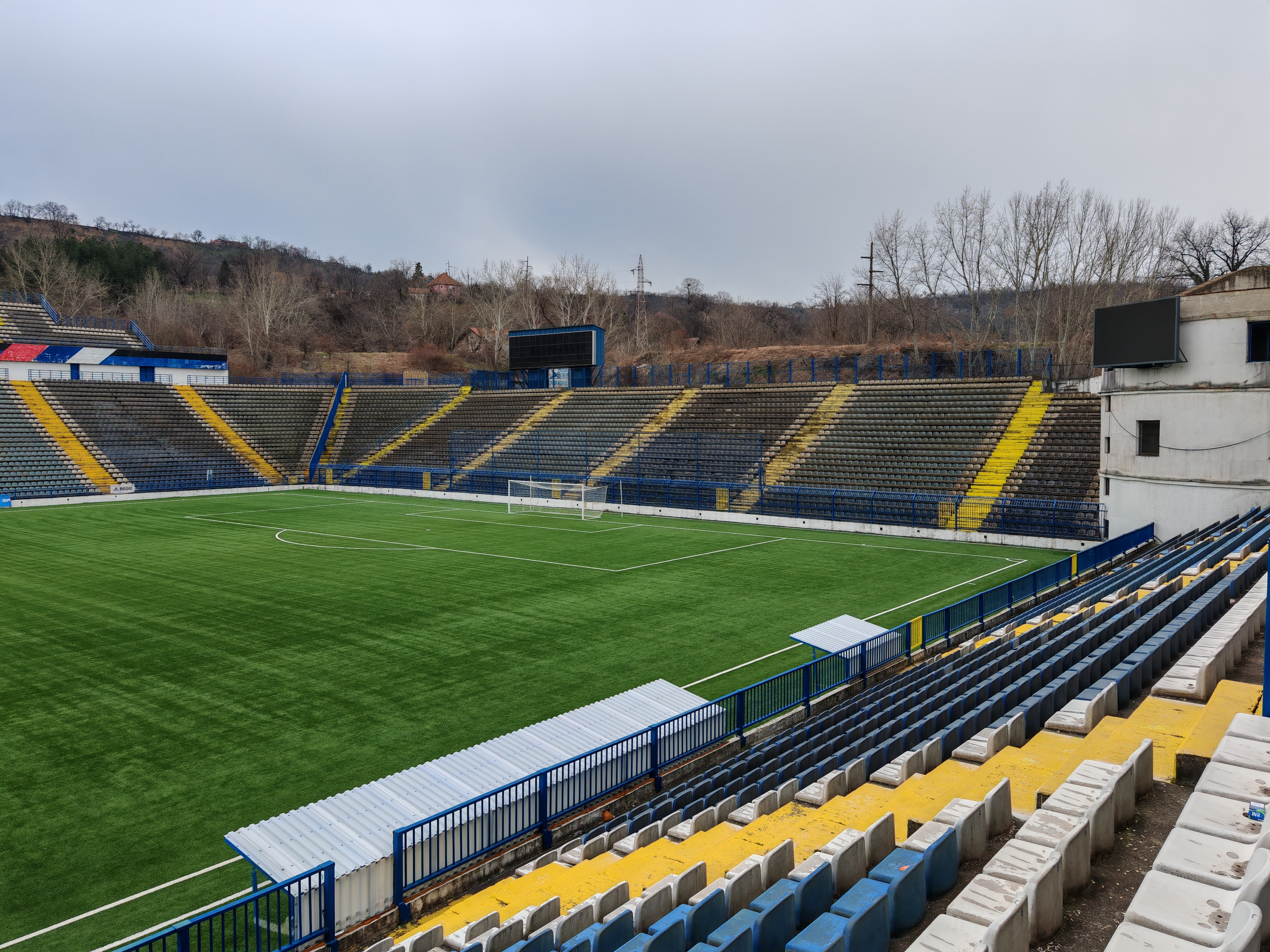
View on the south stand of Smederevo Stadium from the west stand

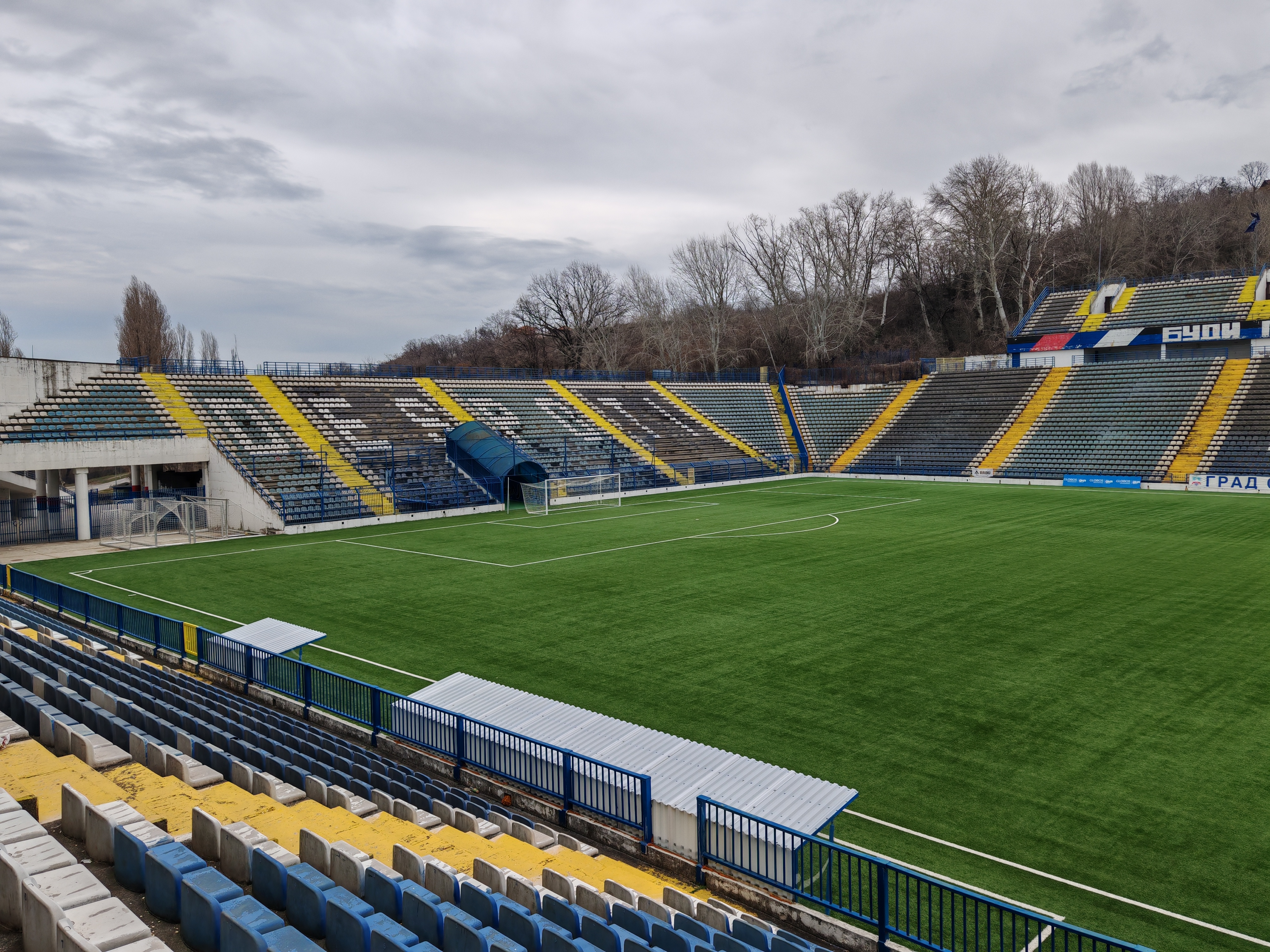
View on the north stand of Smederevo Stadium from the west stand

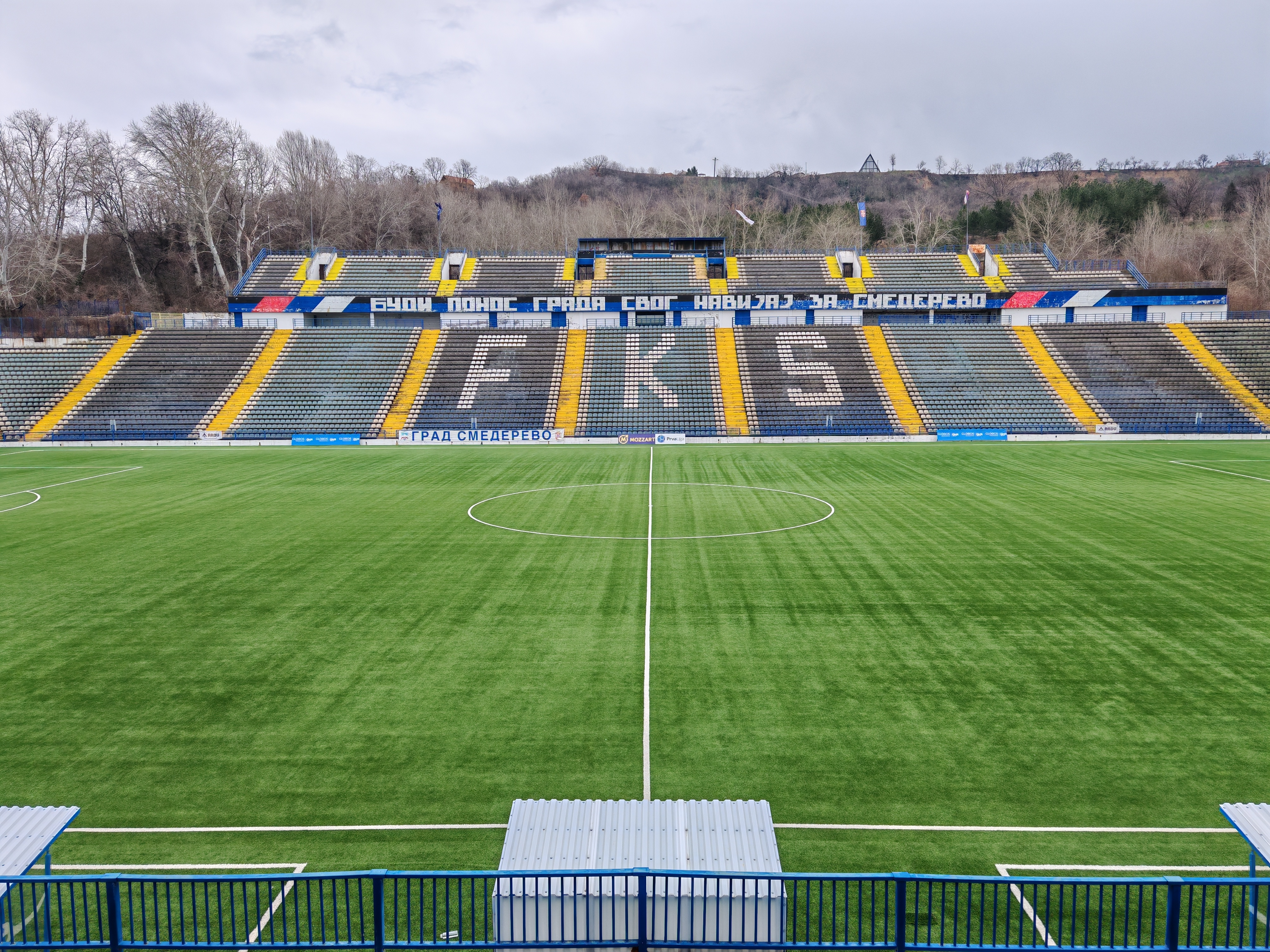
Centered (large) view on the east stand of Smederevo Stadium from the west stand

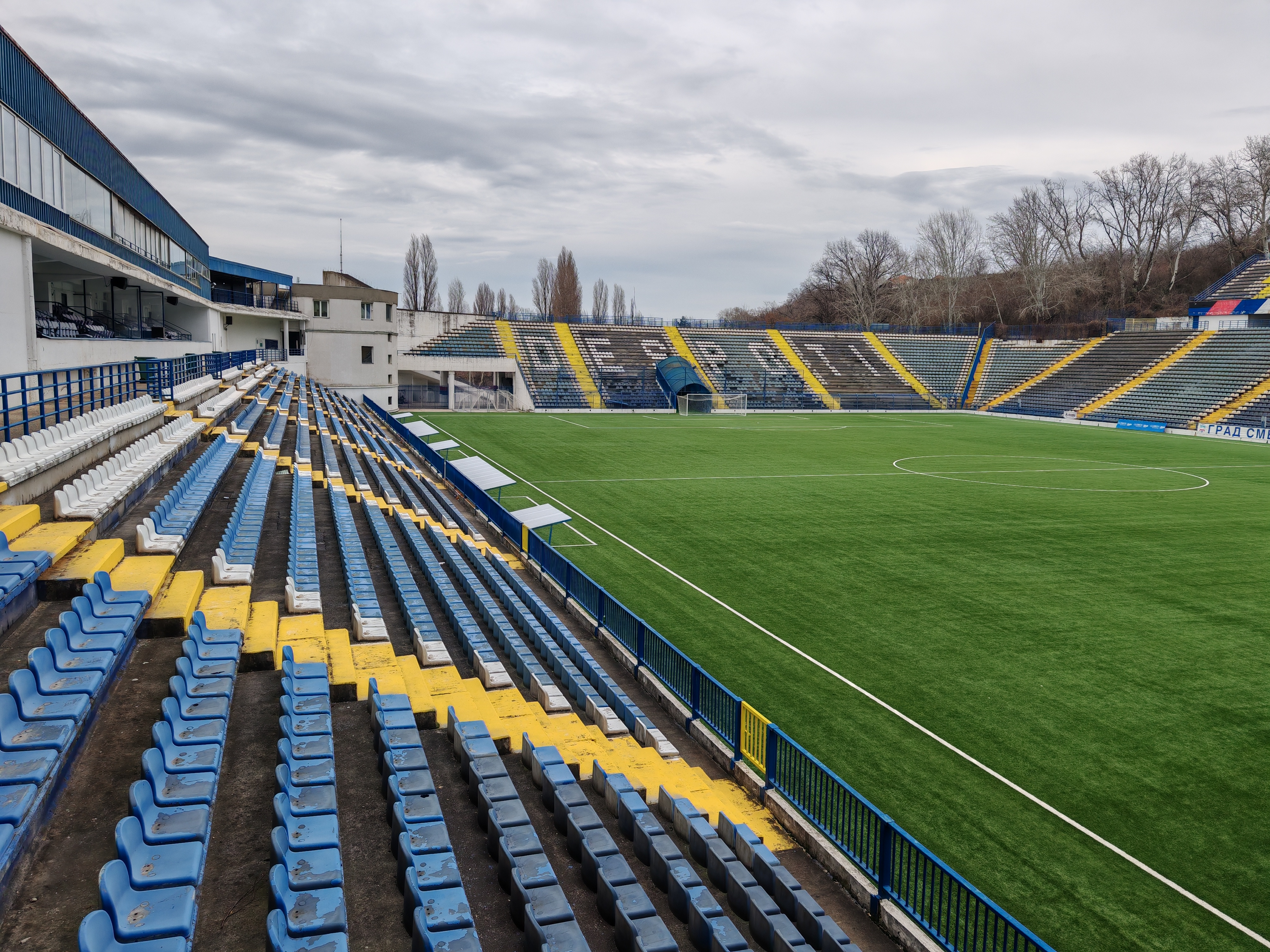
View on the west and north stand of Smederevo Stadium

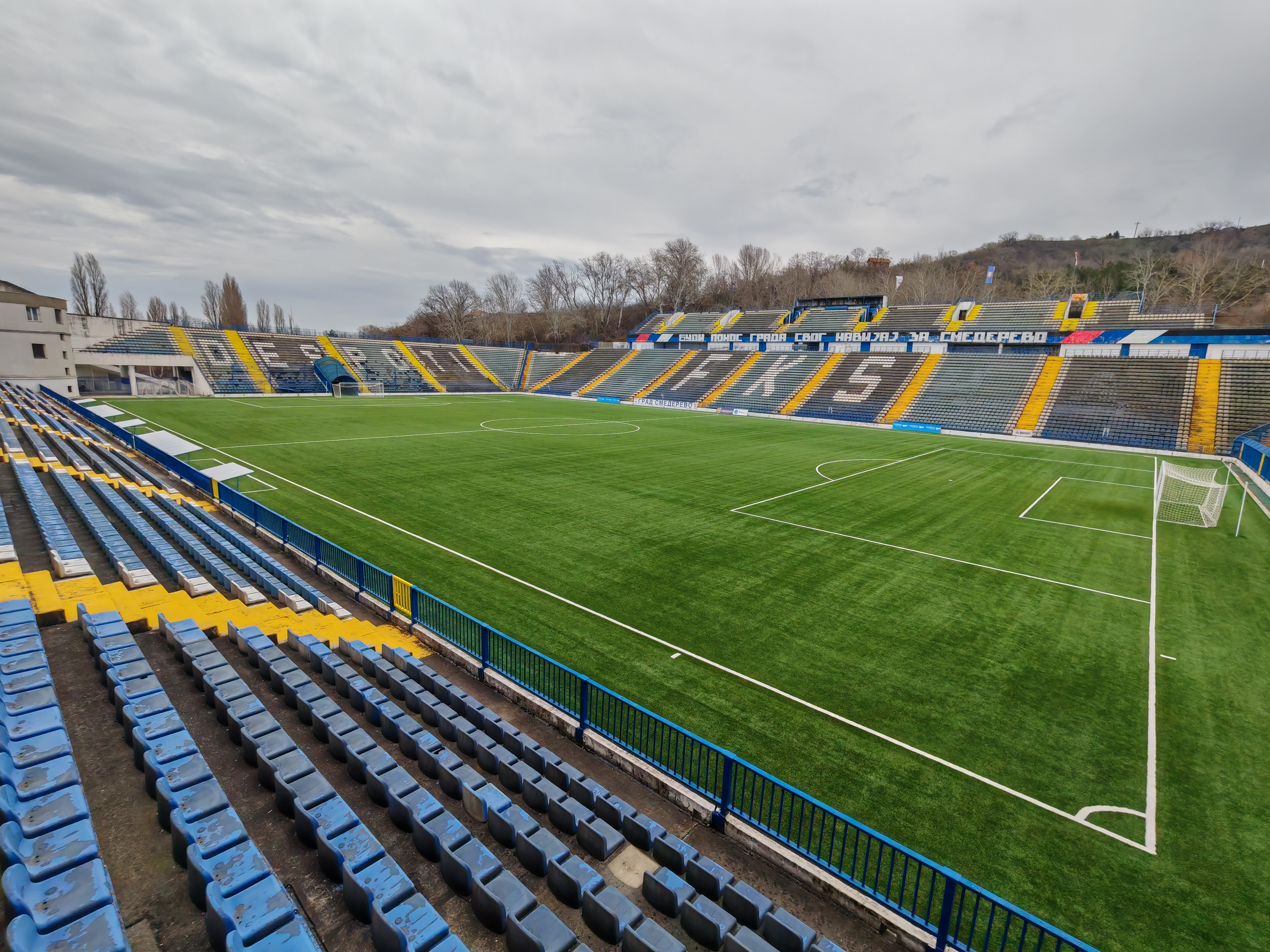
View of Smederevo Stadium from the angle of west stand

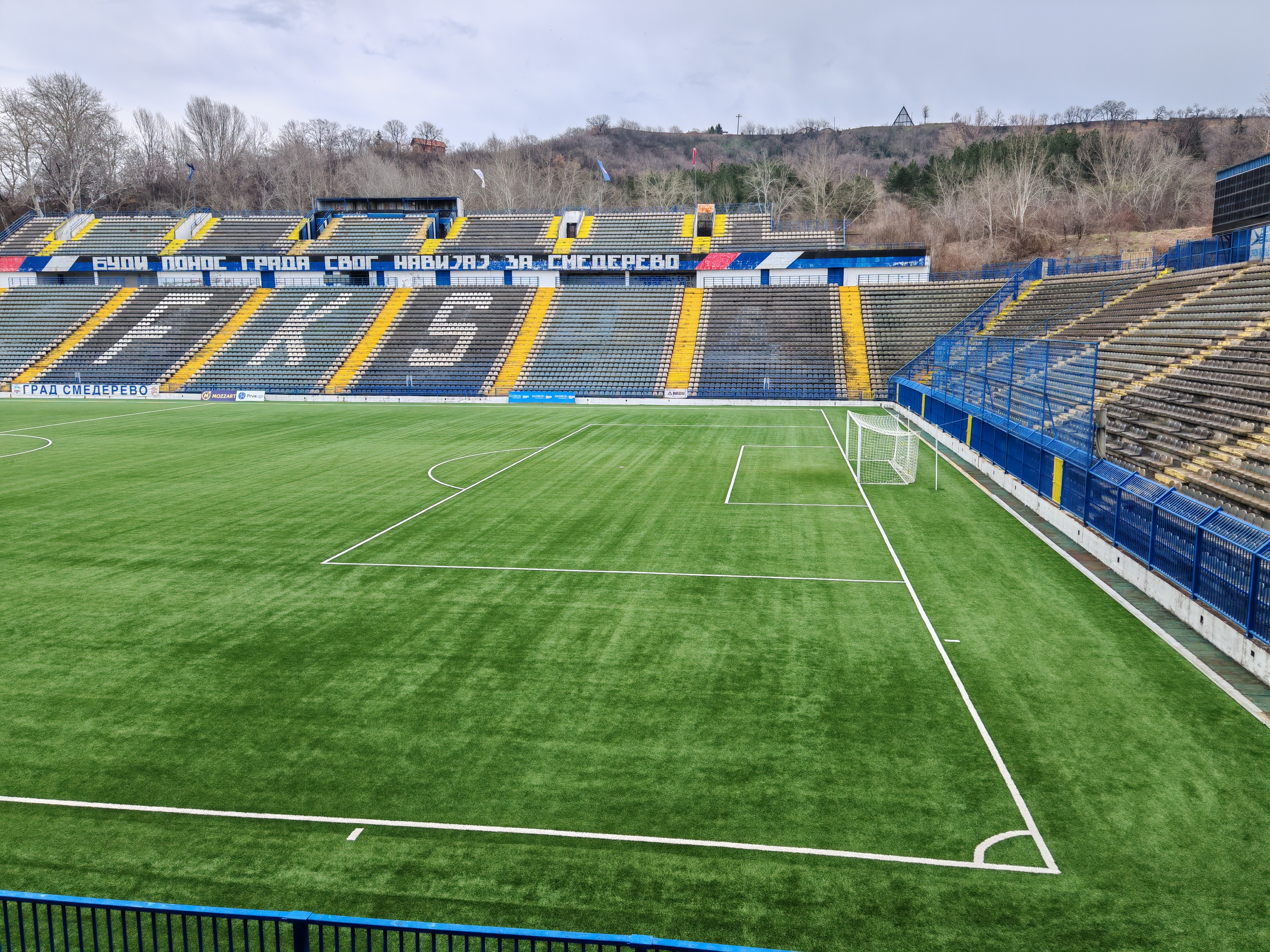
View on goal post near the south stand of Smederevo Stadium from the angle of west stand

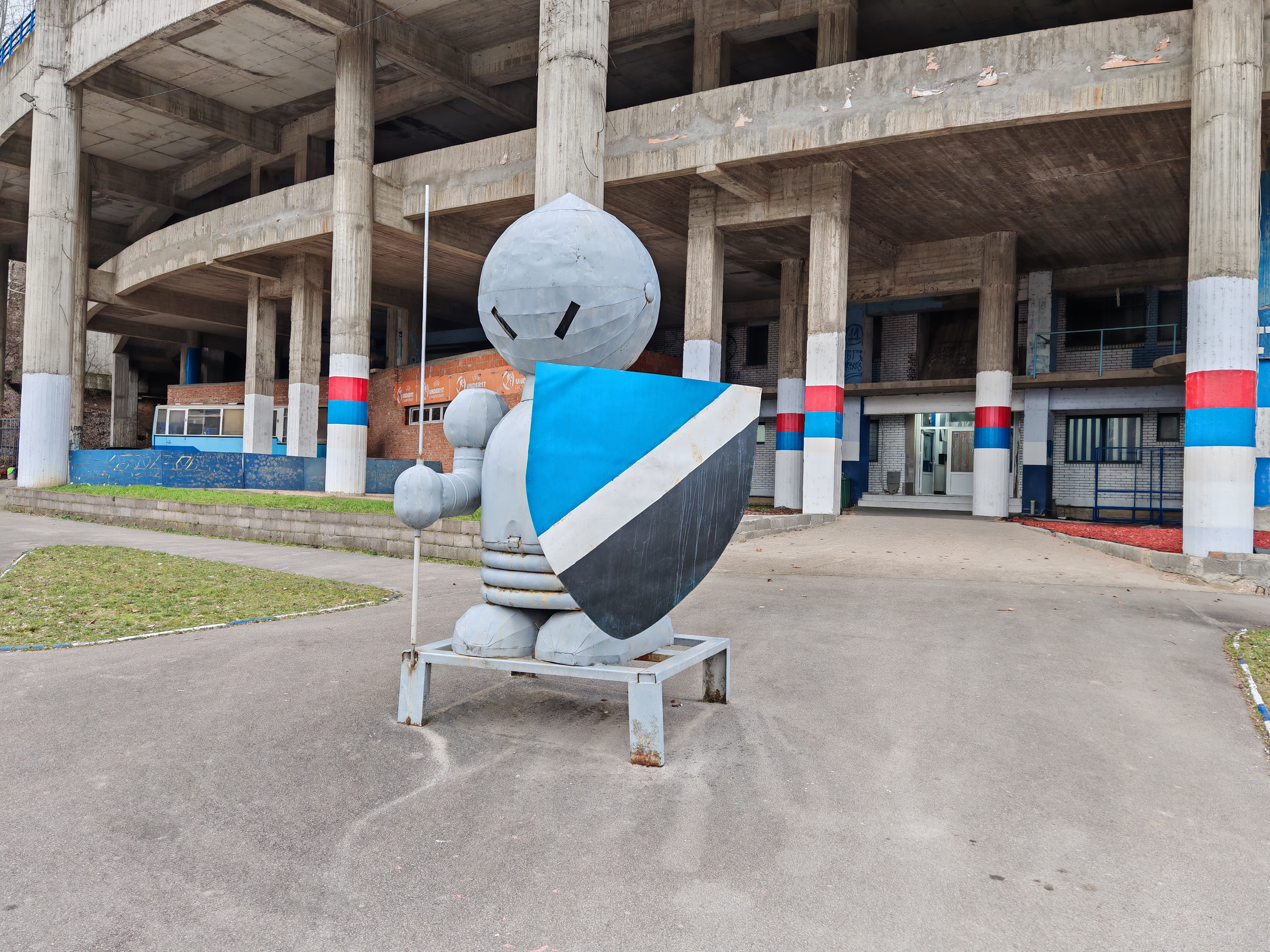
The "Oklopnik" mascot in front of Smederevo Stadium

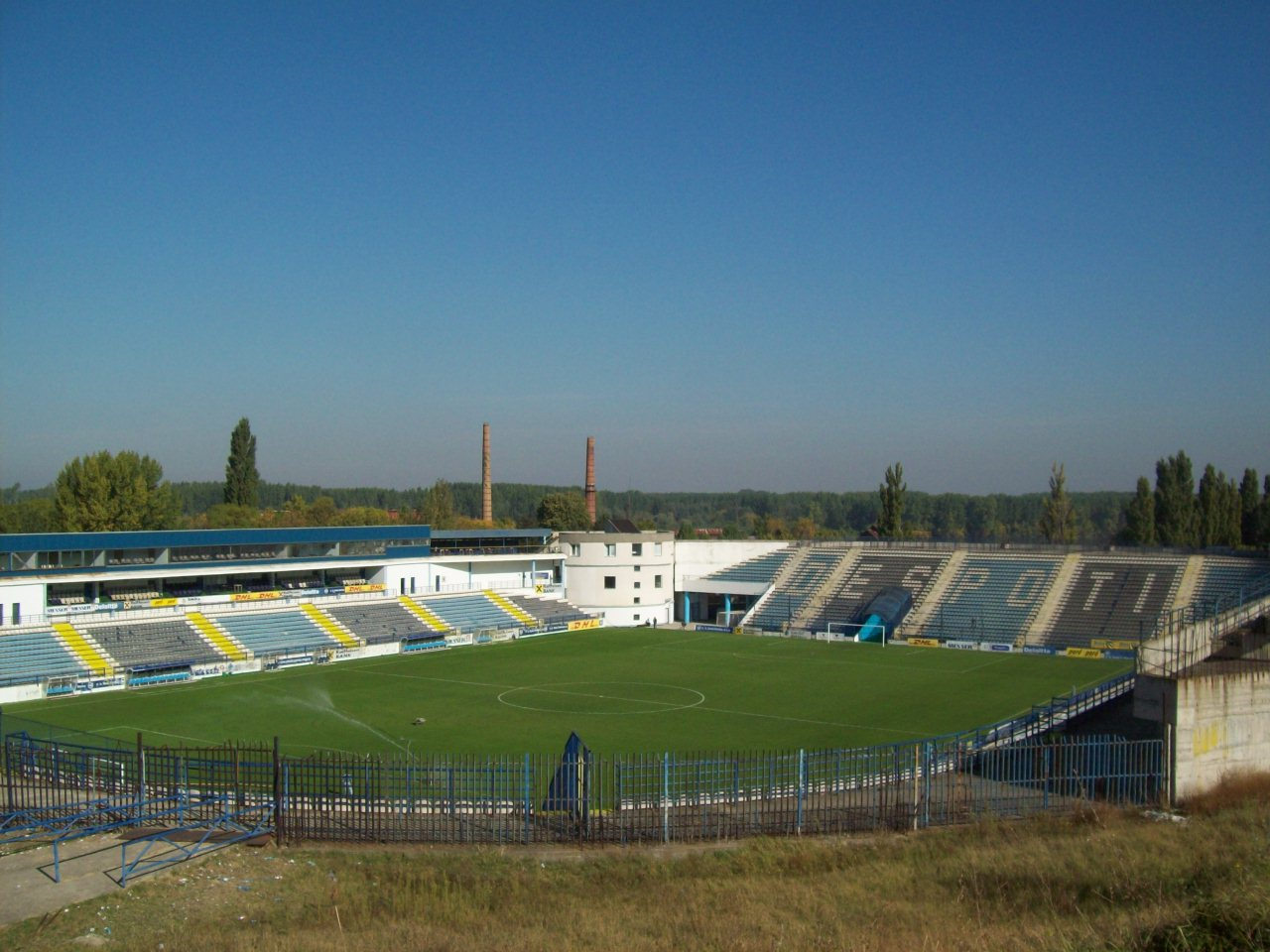
View on Smederevo Stadium from a nearby hill near its south-east corner, October 2009

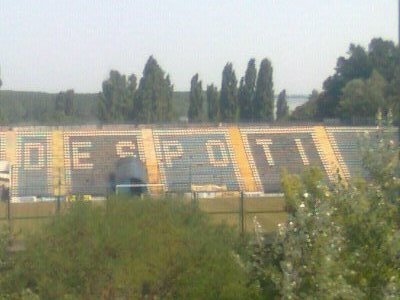
View on north stand, August 2012

== International matches ==
FR Yugoslavia national football team played here once.

#	Date	Competition	Opponent	Score	Att.	Ref
(Federal Republic of Yugoslavia) FR Yugoslavia (1992–2003)
1.	17 April 2002	Friendly match	Lithuania	4–1 (2–1)	15,000	

== See also ==
- List of football stadiums in Serbia
