= Mihajlovac (Smederevo) =

Mihajlovac Михајловац
- Village (Selo)
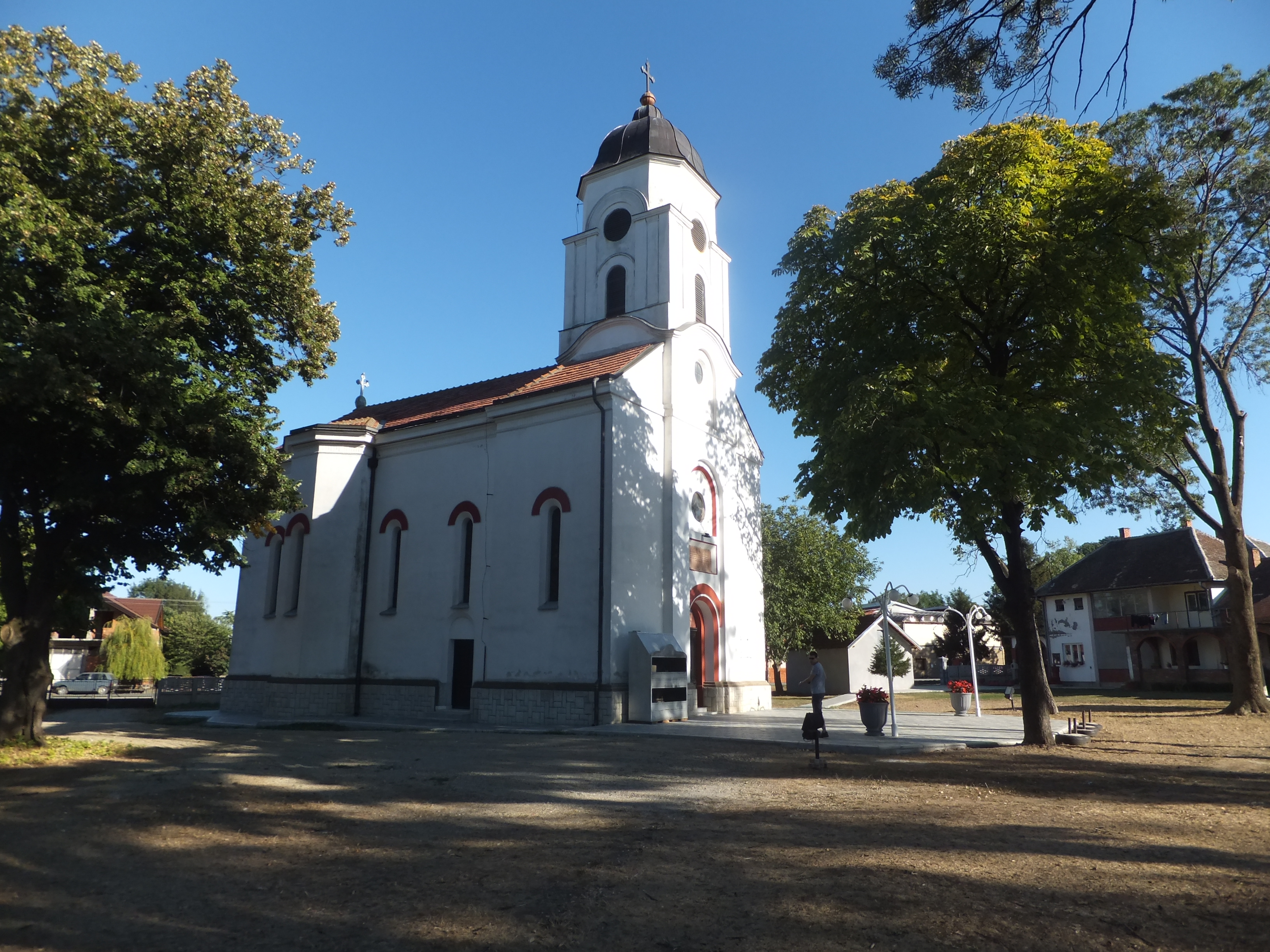
- Church of St. Elijah

- Location within Serbia
- Coordinates: 44°32′38″N 20°58′22″E
- Country: Serbia
- District: Podunavlje District
- Municipality: Smederevo
- Elevation: 325 ft (99 m)

Population (2022)
  - Total: 2,248
- Time zone: UTC+1 (CET)
  - Summer (DST): UTC+2 (CEST)
- Postal code: 11312
- Area code: 026
- Vehicle registration: SM

Mihajlovac is a village in the municipality of Smederevo, Serbia. According to the 2011 census, the village has a population of 2,674 people.
