= FK Smederevo 1924 =

Smederevo 1924
- Full name: Fudbalski klub Smederevo 1924
- Nickname: Oklopnici (The Armors)
- Founded: 6 May 1924; 102 years ago
- Ground: Smederevo Stadium
- Capacity: 17,200
- President: Časlav Ilić
- Head Coach: Nenad Mijailović
- League: Serbian First League
- 2025–26: Serbian First League, 7th of 16
- Website: fksmederevo1924.rs
| Home colours | Away colours |

Fudbalski klub Smederevo 1924 (Serbian Cyrillic: Фудбалски клуб Смедерево 1924), commonly known as Smederevo 1924 or simply Smederevo, is a Serbian professional football club based in Smederevo. They compete in the Serbian First League, the second tier of the national league system.

At the beginning of the 2000s, the club (then known as Sartid Smederevo) became one of the most successful clubs in the country and took part in European competitions in five consecutive seasons, with some memorable matches against the likes of TSV 1860 Munich and Ipswich Town. The club achieved its greatest success by defeating Red Star Belgrade 1–0 in the 2002–03 Serbia and Montenegro Cup final.

== History ==
Acting on suggestion from chief engineer Ernest Radlinski, the club was first founded on 6 May 1924 by SARTID (Srpsko akcionarsko rudarsko topioničarsko industrijsko društvo) as FK Sartid. At the beginning, FK Sartid's roster was mostly filled with professional players from Hungary, Austria and Germany and the club failed to make much noise in the Kingdom of Yugoslavia's football scene. Then in 1944, it was essentially disbanded by Yugoslavia's new communist authorities following the end of World War II, along with the entire Sartid factory whose property was nationalized.

Though it is not certain if what followed can be viewed in continuity with FK Sartid, many fans consider it to be a part of club's history, so depending on one's opinion, either a new club appeared or the name was simply changed to FK Metalac in 1944.

The following period was marked by numerous name changes. Two years later in 1946 the name was switched to FK Jedinstvo, and it lasted only three years until 1949 when it was changed to FK Smederevo.

Sartid crest (1992–2004)

In 1958, FK Smederevo merged with FK Metalac to form OFK Budućnost, the name that stuck around until 1962 when it was switched back to FK Smederevo. That setup lasted until 1967, when the club became FK Metalurg.

In 1976, the name was switched to FK Smederevo for the third time, lasting until the breakup of Yugoslavia in 1992.

All throughout this 48-year period, the club toiled in lower leagues (Serbian regional league, etc.).

FK Sartid was reborn in 1992 when Sartid metallurgical concern took over the club's ownership and sponsorship, and promptly switched to its original name. The renaissance commenced immediately as the club went from Smederevo Zone League to Yugoslav First League in six seasons. The 1998–99 campaign will go down in history as the club's first in top flight. The club's success in this period was tied to their main board president Dušan Matković. In addition to his position at FK Sartid, Matković was also a high-ranking official of Slobodan Milošević's party SPS as well as Minister of Industry in the government of Mirko Marjanović. The allegations that the club was involved in various illegal and irregular activities, and also protected from persecution because of their powerful benefactor, during this period are numerous.

After losing the national cup final to Crvena Zvezda in 2002, the club won the competition against the same opponent in 2003. In the summer of 2004, the club changed its name back to FK Smederevo.

The most noted player is former team captain Goran Bogdanović. He retired after the 2003–04 season.

In summer 2014, FK Smederevo merged with FK Seljak from Mihajlovac to form FK Semendrija 1924. In January 2015, the club changed its name to FK Smederevo. They finished 7th in the 2014–15 Serbian League West.

In the 2018–19 season FK Smederevo finished first in the Serbian League West and were promoted to the Serbian First League.

In the 2022–23 season FK Smederevo won the Serbian League West and were promoted to the Serbian First League again.

=== Names of the club through history ===
| Year | Club |
|---|---|
| 1924–1944 | FK Sartid Smederevo |
| 1944–1946 | FK Metalac Smederevo |
| 1946–1949 | FD Jedinstvo Smederevo |
| 1949–1952 | ŽSD Smederevo |
| 1952–1958 | FK Smederevo |
| 1958–1962 | OFK Budućnost Smederevo – fusion FK Smederevo and FK Metalac |
| 1962–1967 | FK Smederevo |
| 1967–1976 | FK Metalurg Smederevo |
| 1976–1992 | FK Smederevo |
| 1992–2004 | FK Sartid Smederevo |
| 2004–2014 | FK Smederevo |
| 2014–2015 | FK Semendrija 1924 Smederevo – fusion FK Smederevo and FK Seljak Mihajlovac |
| 2015– | FK Smederevo ‘24 |

== European seasons ==
=== 2001–02 ===
Head coach Jovica Škoro guided his team to a 3rd place league finish and a Yugoslav Cup final where they lost to Red Star.

On the European front, Sartid competed in UEFA Intertoto Cup where they recorded a first round win versus Dundee (0–0 away, 5–2 at home before 16,000 fans). The journey ended in second round versus TSV 1860 München featuring veterans Thomas Häßler and Vidar Riseth (1–3 away, 2–3 at home).

=== 2002–03 ===
The year that started off in high style almost turned sour towards the end with a string of poor results that sent the team spiraling down the table. Management reacted quickly, sacking coach Škoro in April, and bringing in Milenko Kiković for his second stint with the club. The move paid immediate dividends and relegation was avoided comfortably. And if that wasn't enough cause for celebration, Sartid managed to beat Crvena Zvezda 1–0 in Serbia and Montenegro Cup final at Partizan Stadium, achieving the club's greatest success in history.

Similarly to Sartid's domestic campaign, the year in Europe started off glowingly. They quickly disposed of Welsh side Bangor City to reach the UEFA Cup first round where Ipswich Town was waiting. The hopes were further raised following a favourable away result 1–1, meaning they just needed to keep a clean sheet at home to progress. However, the combination of Marcus Bent converting an early 9th-minute penalty and Sartid failing to score for the remainder of the match spelled painful elimination.

=== 2003–04 ===
The 2003–04 campaign was another fairly stable season in top league result wise. Though as usual not on the coaching front. New head coach Ratko Dostanić, brought in before the season, started off tremendously. In UEFA Cup, he led the squad to a memorable win in a tie against Sarajevo. With Dostanić firmly in charge, Sartid's form continued in the domestic league, too. At the midway point of the season Sartid was sitting in third place, just behind Belgrade powerhouses Crvena Zvezda and Partizan. During the winter break, Dostanić wanted the team captain Goran Bogdanović promoted to the role of technical director, but new club president Thomas Kelly would have none of it so Dostanić decided to leave. In January 2004, Zvonko Varga was appointed as a new coach, but he left the club after only few matches. Afterwards, old face Milenko Kiković was brought back to coach and he managed to complete a successful season for the club.

=== 2004–05 ===
The following 2004–05 season was not nearly as happy. It started off alright with demolition of lowly Andorran side Sant Julià in Intertoto Cup first round, but the painful next round exit at the hands of Dinamo Minsk turned out to be ominous. All throughout the domestic campaign Smederevo battled relegation threat. During the winter break coach Kiković resigned leaving the team in 10th place with 17 points. New head coach Tomislav Sivić managed to narrowly keep the club in top flight.

=== 2005–06 ===
The 2005–06 season has been another difficult one for the club. The embarrassing Intertoto Cup first round exit to Prilep's Pobeda was a sign of things to come. After managing only 13 points from 11 league matches, head coach Tomislav Sivić resigned on 1 November 2005 in the wake of the team's third straight league loss. Following a period under a caretaker, club appointed Spaniard Jaume Bauzà on 28 November 2005. Though the team's overall play somewhat improved, it was enough to avoid relegation at the end of the season.

== Season-by-season record ==
=== Key ===
League

- P = Matches played
- W = Matches won
- D = Matches drawn
- L = Matches lost
- F = Goals for
- A = Goals against
- Pts = Points won
- Pos = Final position

Serbia

- Div 1 = Serbian SuperLiga
- Div 2 = Serbian First League
- Div 3 = Serbian League West
- Cup = Serbian Cup

Cup / Europe

- N/A = Was not held
- — = Did not compete
- QR = Qualifying round
- PR = Play-off round
- R1 = First round
- R2 = Second round
- QF = Quarter-final
- SF = Semi-final
- F = Final/Runner-up
- W = Competition won

| Champions † | Runners-up ‡ | Promoted ↑ | Relegated ↓ |

=== Seasons ===
Domestic and international results of Smederevo
| Season | League | | | | | | | | | Cup | Europe |
| Season | Division | Pos | P | W | D | L | F | A | Pts | Cup | Europe |
|---|---|---|---|---|---|---|---|---|---|---|---|
| 1996–97 | Div 2 ↑ | 1st † | 34 | 26 | 4 | 4 | 77 | 20 | 82 | — | — |
| 1997–98 | Div 1B ↑ | 2nd ‡ | 33 | 19 | 6 | 8 | 46 | 23 | 63 | QF | — |
| 1998–99 | Div 1 | 9th | 24 | 7 | 9 | 8 | 24 | 27 | 30 | QF | — |
| 1999–00 | Div 1 | 16th | 40 | 14 | 8 | 18 | 42 | 47 | 50 | R2 | — |
| 2000–01 | Div 1 | 4th | 34 | 17 | 3 | 14 | 49 | 47 | 54 | R2 | — |
| 2001–02 | Div 1 | 3rd | 34 | 17 | 7 | 10 | 46 | 36 | 58 | F | UEFA Intertoto Cup – R2 |
| 2002–03 | Div 1 | 11th | 34 | 10 | 15 | 9 | 44 | 44 | 45 | W | UEFA Cup – R1 |
| 2003–04 | Div 1 | 5h | 30 | 14 | 7 | 9 | 43 | 36 | 49 | R2 | UEFA Cup – R1 |
| 2004–05 | Div 1 | 10th | 30 | 9 | 10 | 11 | 28 | 36 | 37 | QF | UEFA Intertoto Cup – R2 |
| 2005–06 | Div 1 | 11th | 30 | 11 | 6 | 13 | 30 | 37 | 39 | QF | UEFA Intertoto Cup – R1 |
| 2006–07 | Div 1 | 8th | 30 | 12 | 7 | 13 | 33 | 40 | 43 | R1 | — |
| 2007–08 | Div 1 ↓ | 10th | 33 | 10 | 6 | 17 | 33 | 44 | 36 | R2 | — |
| 2008–09 | Div 2 ↑ | 2nd ‡ | 34 | 19 | 9 | 6 | 47 | 24 | 66 | QF | — |
| 2009–10 | Div 1 | 10th | 30 | 8 | 10 | 12 | 23 | 30 | 34 | QF | — |
| 2010–11 | Div 1 | 10th | 30 | 8 | 11 | 11 | 24 | 31 | 35 | R2 | — |
| 2011–12 | Div 1 | 13th | 30 | 9 | 2 | 19 | 22 | 42 | 29 | QF | — |
| 2012–13 | Div 1 ↓ | 16th | 30 | 3 | 6 | 21 | 18 | 53 | 15 | R2 | — |
| 2013–14 | Div 2 ↓ | 16th | 30 | 8 | 7 | 15 | 26 | 38 | 31 | R1 | — |
| 2014–15 | Div 3 | 7th | 30 | 12 | 8 | 10 | 39 | 35 | 44 | PR | — |
| 2015–16 | Div 3 | 3rd | 30 | 16 | 4 | 10 | 46 | 33 | 52 | — | — |
| 2016–17 | Div 3 | 7th | 30 | 11 | 6 | 13 | 33 | 27 | 39 | — | — |
| 2017–18 | Div 3 | 3rd | 34 | 19 | 7 | 8 | 60 | 31 | 64 | — | — |
| 2018–19 | Div 3 ↑ | 1st † | 30 | 19 | 8 | 3 | 46 | 18 | 64 (Note: 1 point deducted by FA) | — | — |
| 2019–20 | Div 2 ↓ | 16th | 30 | 9 | 5 | 16 | 27 | 47 | 22 (Note: 10 point deducted by FA) | — | — |
| 2020–21 | Div 3 | 6th | 34 | 15 | 8 | 11 | 53 | 40 | 53 | R1 | — |
| 2021–22 | Div 3 | 6th | 30 | 13 | 9 | 8 | 51 | 34 | 48 | — | — |
| 2022–23 | Div 3 ↑ | 1st † | 30 | 24 | 5 | 1 | 62 | 17 | 77 | — | — |
| 2023–24 | Div 2 | 5th | 37 | 14 | 14 | 9 | 40 | 31 | 56 | R2 | — |
| 2024–25 | Div 2 | 12th | 37 | 10 | 11 | 16 | 31 | 47 | 41 | R1 | — |
| 2025–26 | Div 2 | | 37 | | | | | | | PR | — |

== UEFA competitions ==
| Season | Competition | Round | Country | Club | Home | Away | Aggregate |
|---|---|---|---|---|---|---|---|
| 2001–02 | Intertoto Cup | R1 | (Scotland) | Dundee | 5–2 | 0–0 | 5–2 |
| 2001–02 | Intertoto Cup | R2 | (Germany) | 1860 München | 2–3 | 1–3 | 3–6 |
| 2002–03 | UEFA Cup | QR | (Wales) | Bangor City | 2–0 | 0–1 | 2–1 |
| 2002–03 | UEFA Cup | R1 | (England) | Ipswich Town | 0–1 | 1–1 | 1–2 |
| 2003–04 | UEFA Cup | QR | (Bosnia and Herzegovina) | Sarajevo | 3–0 | 1–1 | 4–1 |
| 2003–04 | UEFA Cup | R1 | (Czech Republic) | Slavia Praha | 1–2 | 1–2 | 2–4 |
| 2004–05 | Intertoto Cup | R1 | (Andorra) | Sant Julià | 3–0 | 8–0 | 11–0 |
| 2004–05 | Intertoto Cup | R2 | (Belarus) | Dinamo Minsk | 1–3 | 2–1 | 3–4 |
| 2005–06 | Intertoto Cup | R1 | (North Macedonia) | Pobeda | 0–1 | 1–2 | 1–3 |

== Stadium ==
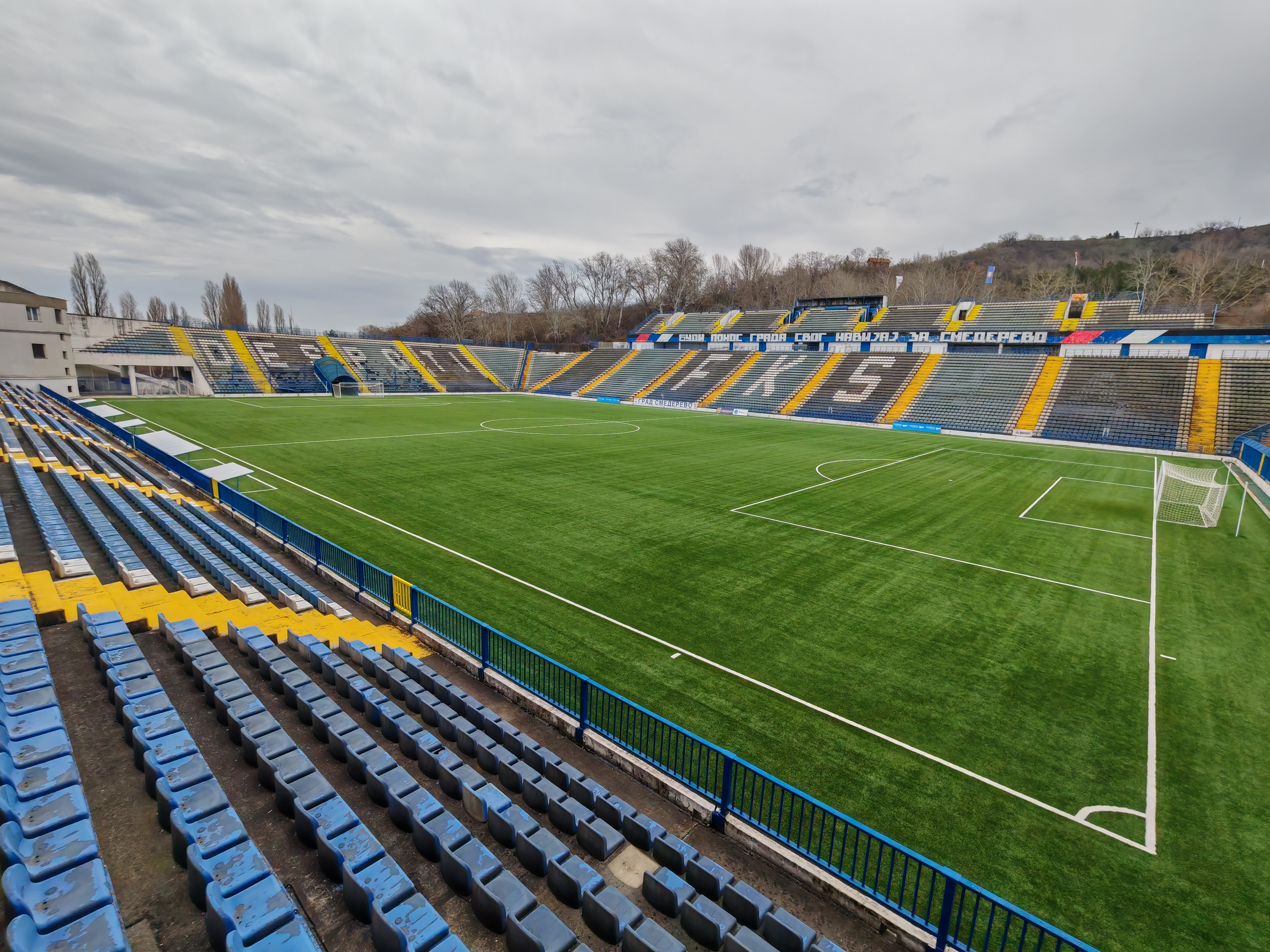
View of Smederevo Stadium from the angle of west stand, February 2026

The home ground of FK Smederevo 1924 is Smederevo Stadium, commonly named "The Fortress" (for nearby Smederevo Fortress) – is one of the stadiums in Serbia with the largest seating capacity, holding up to 17,200 spectators. It was opened in 1930, but it was greatly expanded into a modern-day stadium during the 1990-s.

== Supporters ==
The supporters of FK Smederevo are known as Despoti (The Despots). The name is based on a famous ruler of medieval Serbia Đurađ Branković and his title of Despot.

== Current squad ==
As of 31 October 2026

Note: Flags indicate national team as defined under FIFA eligibility rules; some limited exceptions apply. Players may hold more than one non-FIFA nationality.

| No. | Pos. | Nation | Player |
|---|---|---|---|
| 1 | GK | SRB | Nikola Mirković (captain) |
| 2 | MF | SUI | Nemanja Zarić (dual registration with Železničar Pančevo) |
| 3 | DF | SRB | Stefan Petkoski Cimbaljević (on loan from Radnički 1923) |
| 5 | DF | SRB | Miloš Vranjanin |
| 6 | MF | SRB | Stefan Mitrović (dual registration with Železničar Pančevo) |
| 7 | MF | FRA | Vladimir Karajčić (on loan from Železničar Pančevo) |
| 8 | MF | SRB | Nikola Stojković |
| 9 | FW | BIH | Irfan Hadžić |
| 10 | FW | AUT | Srđan Spiridonović |
| 11 | FW | SRB | Nikola Kodžić |
| 12 | GK | SRB | Damjan Knežević |
| 13 | FW | SRB | Andrej Popov |
| 14 | DF | SRB | Mihailo Oreščanin |
| 15 | DF | SRB | Lazar Kolarević |
| 16 | MF | NGR | Timileyin Joseph (on loan from Železničar Pančevo) |
| 17 | DF | SRB | Strahinja Luković (on loan from OFK Beograd) |

| No. | Pos. | Nation | Player |
|---|---|---|---|
| 18 | DF | CIV | Abdoul Sawadogo (on loan from Železničar Pančevo) |
| 20 | DF | NGR | Ezekiel Ruben |
| 21 | FW | SRB | Dimitrije Adamović |
| 22 | MF | MNE | Bogdan Rmuš |
| 23 | DF | SRB | Luka Čakovan |
| 24 | MF | SRB | Uroš Filipović |
| 25 | DF | SRB | Jovan Mitrović (vice-captain) |
| 26 | DF | SRB | Luka Drobnjak |
| 27 | FW | SRB | Aleksa Preradov |
| 28 | FW | SRB | Toplica Grbović |
| 29 | FW | SRB | Veljko Radojević |
| 30 | FW | SRB | Aleksandar Lutovac |
| 31 | GK | SRB | Vukašin Đorđević |
| 32 | MF | SRB | Pavle Adamović |
| 40 | MF | SRB | Luka Milunović |

=== Out on loan ===
Note: Flags indicate national team as defined under FIFA eligibility rules; some limited exceptions apply. Players may hold more than one non-FIFA nationality.

| No. | Pos. | Nation | Player |

== Club officials ==
=== Coaching staff ===
| Position | Name |
|---|---|
| Head coach | (Serbia) Nenad Mijailović |
| Assistant coach | (Serbia) Goran Janković (Serbia) Danijel Stojković |
| Goalkeeper coach | (Serbia) Dejan Ranković |
| Fitness coach | (Serbia) Ivan Stevanović |
| Physiotherapist | (Serbia) Milanče Raičković (Serbia) Mihailo Marković |
| Doctor | (Serbia) Fedor Zogović |
| Economic | (Serbia) Vladimir Osmanović |
| Club president | (Serbia) Časlav Ilić |
| Sporting director | (Serbia) Miloš Trifunović |
| General secretary | (Serbia) Marjan Milenković |

== Notable players ==
Below are the notable players who have represented the club in national and international competitions since the club's foundation in 1924. To appear in the section below, a player must have played in at least 100 league matches for the club, at least 50 league matches for the club and have at least 1 appearance for their national team, or have at least 5 appearances for their national team.

| Rank. | Player | Period | Apps | Goals | Int. Apps | Int. Goals |
|---|---|---|---|---|---|---|
| 1 | (Serbia) Milorad Zečević | 2000–2010 | 240 | 39 | n/a | |
| 2 | (Serbia) Saša Kocić | 1995–2001; 2002–2006 | 224 | 18 | n/a | |
| 3 | (Serbia) Dejan Ranković | 2000–2001; 2002–2012 | 180 | 0 | n/a | |
| 4 | (Serbia) Dejan Živković | 2006–2013 | 166 | 16 | n/a | |
| 5 | (Serbia) Marko Sočanac | 2000–2008 | 166 | 2 | n/a | |
| 6 | (Serbia) Dragan Radosavljević | 2000–2006; 2007–2008; 2013 | 157 | 11 | n/a | |
| 7 | (Serbia) Vladimir Mudrinić | 2000–2001; 2003–2004; 2006–2008 | 148 | 30 | n/a | |
| 8 | (Serbia) Nenad Mirosavljević | 2000–2004; 2007 | 130 | 63 | n/a | |
| 9 | (Serbia) Dragan Ćeran | 2005–2011 | 129 | 18 | n/a | |
| 10 | (Serbia) Ivan Milosavljević | 2010–2012; 2015–2019 | 129 | 1 | n/a | |
| 11 | (Serbia and Montenegro) Dragan Paunović | 2000–2006 | 114 | 2 | n/a | |
| 12 | (Serbia) Dragan Žilić | 2001–2005 | 112 | 0 | 8 | 0 |
| 13 | (Serbia and Montenegro) Goran Bogdanović | 2000–2004 | 105 | 7 | n/a | |
| 14 | (Serbia) Željko Kovačević | 2003–2007; 2009 | 104 | 3 | n/a | |
| 15 | (Serbia) Saša Antunović | 1998–2002; 2004 | 102 | 21 | n/a | |
| 16 | (Serbia) Dejan Kekezović | 2002–2006 | 102 | 3 | n/a | |
| 17 | (Serbia) Nenad Mladenović | 2006–2010 | 92 | 21 | 1 | 0 |
| 18 | (Serbia and Montenegro) Boris Vasković | 2000–2003 | 92 | 4 | 3 | 0 |
| 19 | (Serbia) Saša Zorić | 2003–2006 | 63 | 7 | 2 | 0 |
| 20 | (Montenegro) Dejan Ognjanović | 2010–2012 | 45 | 2 | 7 (Note: 2 international apps for FR Yugoslavia and 5 for Montenegro) | 0 |
| 21 | (Serbia) Marko Pantelić | 2003 | 31 | 13 | 43 | 10 |
| 22 | (North Macedonia) Blaže Georgioski | 1998–1999 | 23 | 1 | 7 | 0 |
| 23 | (Serbia) Mateja Kežman | 1998 | 14 | 4 | 49 | 17 |
| 24 | (Serbia) Goran Trobok | 2017 | 14 | 0 | 10 | 0 |
| 25 | (Liberia) Omega Roberts | 2012–2013 | 14 | 0 | 8 | 1 |
| 26 | (Serbia) Ivan Radovanović | 2007 | 13 | 0 | 10 | 0 |
| 27 | (North Macedonia) Vlade Lazarevski | 2012 | 13 | 0 | 43 | 0 |

For a list of all Smederevo players with a Wikipedia article, please see: Category:FK Smederevo 1924 players.

== Historical list of coaches ==
- (Socialist Federal Republic of Yugoslavia) Mirko Damjanović
- (Socialist Federal Republic of Yugoslavia) Franjo Glaser
- (Socialist Federal Republic of Yugoslavia) Dušan Mitošević
- (Serbia and Montenegro) Miroslav Vukašinović (1997-1998)
- (Serbia and Montenegro) Branko Radović (1998)
- (Bosnia and Herzegovina) Boško Antić (1998–1999)
- (Serbia and Montenegro) Ivan Golac (1999)
- (Serbia and Montenegro) Milenko Kiković (2000)
- (Serbia and Montenegro) Slobodan Dogandžić (2000)
- (Serbia and Montenegro) Jovica Škoro (2000–2003)
- (Serbia and Montenegro) Milenko Kiković (2003)
- (Serbia and Montenegro) Ratko Dostanić (2003)
- (Serbia and Montenegro) Zvonko Varga (2004)
- (Serbia and Montenegro) Milenko Kiković (2004)
- (Serbia and Montenegro) Tomislav Sivić (2005)
- (Spain) Jaume Bauzà (2005–2006)
- (Serbia) Mihailo Ivanović (2006–2007)
- (Serbia) Goran Milojević (2007)
- (Serbia) Radmilo Ivančević (2007-2008)
- (Serbia) Dragan Đorđević (2008-2009)
- (Serbia) Blagoje Paunović (2009-2010)
- (Serbia) Dragan Đorđević (2010-2012)
- (Serbia) Aleksandar Janjić (2012)
- (Serbia) Miloš Velebit (2012-2013)
- (Serbia) Ljubomir Ristovski (2013)
- (Serbia) Radovan Radaković (2013)
- (Serbia) Branko Smiljanić (2013)
- (Serbia) Mile Tomić (2013-2014)
- (Serbia) Nemanja Smiljanić (2014)
- (Serbia) Dragan Paunović (2014–2016)
- (Serbia) Mihailo Ivanović (2016)
- (Serbia) Milorad Zečević (2016–2018)
- (Serbia) Ljubiša Stamenković (2018)
- (Serbia) Zoran Vujičić (18 Oct 2018–Jun 2019)
- (Serbia) Nikola Puača (20 Jun 2019-Aug 2019)
- (Serbia) Nebojša Vučićević (20 Aug 2019-Dec 2019)
- (Serbia) Ognjen Koroman (29 Dec 2019–Jun 2020)
- (Serbia) Nebojša Maksimović (3 Jun 2020-1 Jul 2020)
- (Serbia) Igor Savić (24 Jul 2020-Dec 2020)
- (Serbia) Dragan Stevanović (30 Dec 2020–Sep 2021)
- (Serbia) Sava Šašić (14 Sep 2021–Jun 2023)
- (Serbia) Saša Mićović (5 Jul 2023–Jun 2024)
- (Serbia) Dragan Radojičić (13 Jun 2024-3 Oct 2024)
- (Serbia) Jovan Golić (4 Oct 2024- Apr 2025)
- (Serbia) Branko Mirjačić (9 Apr 2025-Jun 2025)
- (Serbia) Nikola Mitić (17 Jun 2025-)

== Honours ==
- Serbia and Montenegro Cup
  - Winners (1): 2002–03
- Second League of FR Yugoslavia
  - Champions (1): 1996–97 (Group West)
- Serbian League West
  - Champions (2): 2018–19, 2022–23

== Kit manufacturers and shirt sponsors ==
| Period | Kit manufacturer | Shirt sponsor |
|---|---|---|
| 2001–2003 | NAAI | SARTID |
| 2003–2004 | NAAI | USS |
| 2005–2011 | Nike | USS |
| 2012 | Nike | City of Smederevo |
| 2012–2014 | NAAI | None |

== See also ==
- List of football clubs in Serbia
