= 2002–03 Serbia and Montenegro Cup =

Tournament details
- Country: Serbia and Montenegro
- Teams: 32

Final positions
- Champions: Sartid
- Runners-up: Red Star

Tournament statistics
- Matches played: 31
- Goals scored: 83 (2.68 per match)

The 2002–03 Serbia and Montenegro Cup (in fall season FR Yugoslavia Cup) was the eleventh and last under the name FR Yugoslavia and (after the country was renamed in February 2003) first season of the Serbia and Montenegro's annual football cup. The cup defenders (last winners of the FR Yugoslavia Cup) was Red Star Belgrade, but was defeated by FK Sartid in the final.

== First round ==
Thirty-two teams entered in the First Round. The matches were played on 10, 11 and 18 September 2002.

Team 1	Score	Team 2
Radnički Pirot (II)	3–2	Sutjeska
Borac Čačak (II)	1–6	Partizan
Radnički Niš	0–3	Vojvodina
Sartid	3–1	Lovćen (II)
Zeta	2–2 (2–4 p)	Budućnost Banatski Dvor (II)
Elan (II)	0–1	Železnik
Kom (II)	0–1	Srem (II)
Mladost Lučani (II)	2–0	Big Bull (II)
Novi Sad (II)	1–1 (3–4 p)	Hajduk Kula
Mladenovac (II)	0–2	OFK Beograd
Red Star	3–0	Radnički Kragujevac (II)
Rad	0–0 (5–6 p)	Mladost Apatin (II)
Radnički Beograd (II)	1–0	Čukarički
Rudar Kosovska Mitrovica (?)	0–6^{1}	Zemun
Radnički Klupci (II)	1–4	Obilić
Novi Pazar (III)	0–0 (6–7 p)	Rudar Pljevlja

^{1}The match was played in Raška.
Note: Roman numerals in brackets denote the league tier the clubs participated in the 2002–03 season.

== Second round ==
The 16 winners from the prior round enter this round. The matches were played on 24 and 25 September 2002.

Team 1	Score	Team 2
Železnik	3–0	Mladost Lučani (II)
Srem (II)	0–0 (4–5 p)	Rudar Pljevlja
Red Star	4–0	Radnički Pirot (II)
Partizan	1–1 (5–4 p)	Radnički Beograd (II)
Mladost Apatin (II)	0–1	Budućnost Banatski Dvor (II)
Zemun	1–2	Vojvodina
OFK Beograd	2–3	Obilić
Hajduk Kula	0–2	Sartid

Note: Roman numerals in brackets denote the league tier the clubs participated in the 2002–03 season.

== Quarter-finals ==
The eight winners from the prior round enter this round. The matches were played on 27 November 2002.

Team 1	Score	Team 2
Vojvodina	0–0 (3–4 p)	Red Star
Partizan	1–4	Železnik
Rudar Pljevlja	1–2	Sartid
Budućnost Banatski Dvor (II)	0–0 (4–2 p)	Obilić

Note: Roman numerals in brackets denote the league tier the clubs participated in the 2002–03 season.

== Semi-finals ==
The four winners from the prior round enter this round. The matches were played on 9 April 2003.

Team 1	Score	Team 2
Budućnost Banatski Dvor (II)	0–1	Red Star
Sartid	1–1 (3–1 p)	Železnik

Note: Roman numerals in brackets denote the league tier the clubs participated in the 2002–03 season.

== Final ==
29 May 2003
17:30

Red Star	0–1 (a.e.t.)	Sartid
	Report	Pantelić 110'

Partizan Stadium, Belgrade
Attendance: 10,000
Referee: Miroslav Radoman (Lovćenac)

== See also ==
- 2002–03 First League of Serbia and Montenegro
- 2002–03 Second League of Serbia and Montenegro
