= 2002–03 FK Partizan season =

Partizan
2002–03 season
- President: Ivan Ćurković
- Head coach: Ljubiša Tumbaković (until 18 December 2002); Lothar Matthäus
- First League of Serbia and Montenegro: Winners
- Serbia and Montenegro Cup: Quarterfinals
- UEFA Champions League: Third qualifying round
- UEFA Cup: Second round
- Top goalscorer: League: Zvonimir Vukić (22 goals); All: Zvonimir Vukić (24 goals)

The 2002–03 season was FK Partizan's 11th season in First League of Serbia and Montenegro. This article shows player statistics and all matches (official and friendly) that the club played during the 2002–03 season.

== Players ==
=== Squad information ===
Note: Flags indicate national team as defined under FIFA eligibility rules; some limited exceptions apply. Players may hold more than one non-FIFA nationality.

No.	Pos.	Nation	Player
1	GK	SCG	Radovan Radaković
2	DF	SCG	Milivoje Ćirković
3	DF	SCG	Dragoljub Jeremić
4	MF	SCG	Igor Duljaj
5	DF	SCG	Dejan Ognjanović
6	DF	BIH	Nenad Kutlačić
7	DF	MKD	Milan Stojanoski
8	MF	SCG	Goran Trobok
9	FW	SCG	Andrija Delibašić
10	MF	SCG	Zvonimir Vukić
11	FW	SCG	Damir Čakar
12	FW	SCG	Miladin Bečanović
13	GK	SCG	Radiša Ilić
14	DF	SCG	Nenad Mišković
15	DF	SCG	Nikola Malbaša
16	DF	NGA	Taribo West

No.	Pos.	Nation	Player
17	FW	SCG	Ivica Iliev
18	MF	SCG	Vladimir Ivić
19	MF	SCG	Ajazdin Nuhi
20	FW	SCG	Dejan Živković
22	MF	SCG	Saša Ilić
23	MF	SCG	Dejan Rusmir
24	DF	SCG	Branko Savić
25	DF	BIH	Branimir Bajić
26	FW	SCG	Danko Lazović
28	MF	SCG	Albert Nađ
38	DF	SCG	Miloš Stojčić
41	GK	SCG	Đorđe Pantić
42	MF	SCG	Simon Vukčević
47	DF	SCG	Bojan Zavišić
49	FW	SCG	Borko Veselinović

=== Squad statistics ===
No.	Name	League		Cup		Europe		Total		Discipline(SL)	
No.	Name	Apps	Goals	Apps	Goals	Apps	Goals	Apps	Goals	Yellow card	Red card
Goalkeepers
1	(Serbia and Montenegro) Radovan Radaković	13	-13	2	-2	5	-8	20	-23	4	0
13	(Serbia and Montenegro) Radiša Ilić	20	-22	1	-4	3	-9	24	-35	0	0
Defenders
2	(Serbia and Montenegro) Milivoje Ćirković	12+4	0	0+1	0	5	0	17+5	0	3	0
3	(Serbia and Montenegro) Dragoljub Jeremić	5+1	0	0+1	0	3+1	0	8+3	0	1	0
5	(Serbia and Montenegro) Dejan Ognjanović	9	2	1	0	1+1	0	11+1	2	2	0
7	(North Macedonia) Milan Stojanoski	13+4	1	1	0	1+1	0	15+5	1	3	0
14	(Serbia and Montenegro) Nenad Mišković	11+4	0	2	0	5+1	0	18+5	0	1	0
15	(Serbia and Montenegro) Nikola Malbaša	15	1	0	0	0	0	15	1	2	0
16	(Nigeria) Taribo West	11	1	0	0	0	0	11	1	0	0
19	(Serbia and Montenegro) Ajazdin Nuhi	2+1	0	1+1	0	1	0	4+2	0	2	1
24	(Serbia and Montenegro) Branko Savić	28+1	1	3	1	8	0	39+1	2	6	0
25	(Bosnia and Herzegovina) Branimir Bajić	25	1	2	0	7	0	34	1	6	0
38	(Serbia and Montenegro) Miloš Stojčić	2	0	0	0	0	0	2	0	0	0
47	(Serbia and Montenegro) Bojan Zavišić	3+7	0	1	0	0	0	4+7	0	2	1
Midfielders
4	(Serbia and Montenegro) Igor Duljaj	29+2	0	3	0	7	0	39+2	0	5	0
8	(Serbia and Montenegro) Goran Trobok	31+1	2	2	0	6+1	0	39+2	2	2	0
10	(Serbia and Montenegro) Zvonimir Vukić	29+1	22	3	1	7	1	39+1	24	7	0
18	(Serbia and Montenegro) Vladimir Ivić	8+5	3	1	0	4+2	2	13+7	5	3	0
22	(Serbia and Montenegro) Saša Ilić (c)	22+3	11	1+1	0	8	2	31+4	13	5	0
28	(Serbia and Montenegro) Albert Nađ	9+1	0	1	0	0	0	10+1	0	6	1
42	(Serbia and Montenegro) Simon Vukčević	0+1	0	0	0	0	0	0+1	0	0	0
Forwards
9	(Serbia and Montenegro) Andrija Delibašić	14+16	11	2+1	2	3+2	2	19+19	15	6	0
11	(Serbia and Montenegro) Damir Čakar	12+14	7	1	2	0+7	2	13+21	11	6	0
12	(Serbia and Montenegro) Miladin Bečanović	1+1	0	0+1	0	0+1	0	1+3	0	0	0
17	(Serbia and Montenegro) Ivica Iliev	25+2	13	2	0	8	2	35+2	15	4	0
20	(Serbia and Montenegro) Dejan Živković	3+7	0	0+1	0	0+1	1	3+9	1	1	0
23	(Serbia and Montenegro) Dejan Rusmir	0+5	0	1+1	0	0+4	0	1+10	0	0	0
26	(Serbia and Montenegro) Danko Lazović	23+3	11	2	1	6	3	31+3	15	6	0
49	(Serbia and Montenegro) Borko Veselinović	0+1	0	0	0	0	0	0+1	0	0	0

=== Top scorers ===
Includes all competitive matches. The list is sorted by shirt number when total goals are equal.

Position	Nation	Number	Name	League	Cup	Europe	Total
1	(Serbia and Montenegro)	10	Zvonimir Vukić	22	1	1	24
2	(Serbia and Montenegro)	9	Andrija Delibašić	11	2	2	15
=	(Serbia and Montenegro)	17	Ivica Iliev	13	0	2	15
=	(Serbia and Montenegro)	26	Danko Lazović	11	1	3	15

== Competitions ==
=== Overview ===
Competition	Record							
Competition	P	W	D	L	GF	GA	GD	Win %
First League of Serbia and Montenegro	34	29	2	3	88	36	+52	85.29
Serbia and Montenegro Cup	3	1	1	1	8	6	+2	33.33
UEFA Cup	8	3	2	3	16	17	−1	37.50
Total	45	33	5	7	112	59	+53	73.33

=== First League ===
Pos	Team	Pld	W	D	L	GF	GA	GD	Pts	Qualification or relegation
1	Partizan (C)	34	29	2	3	88	36	+52	89	Qualification for Champions League second qualifying round
2	Red Star Belgrade	34	21	7	6	68	26	+42	70	Qualification for UEFA Cup qualifying round (Note: Sartid qualified for 2003–04 UEFA Cup as winner of 2002–03 Serbia and Montenegro Cup.)
3	OFK Beograd	34	19	6	9	57	36	+21	63	Qualification for Intertoto Cup first round
4	Sutjeska	34	19	5	10	43	32	+11	62	Qualification for Intertoto Cup first round
5	Železnik	34	18	8	8	56	37	+19	62	

Source: RSSSF.org
Rules for classification: 1) points; 2) goal difference; 3) number of goals scored.
(C) Champions

=== Serbia and Montenegro Cup ===
Partizan will participate in the 1st Serbia and Montenegro Cup starting in 1/16 Round.

Date	Round	Opponents	Ground	Result	Scorers
11 September 2002	1/16	Borac Čačak	A	6 – 1	Savić 3', Čakar 13',20', Lazović 52', Delibašić 67',70'.
25 September 2002	1/8	Radnički Jugopetrol	H	5 - 4(p.s.o.)	Šubert 39' (o.g)
27 November 2002	1/4	Železnik	H	1 – 4	Vukić 80'

=== UEFA Champions League ===
==== Second Qualifying Round ====
31 July 2002 1st leg	Hammarby (Sweden)	1–1	(Federal Republic of Yugoslavia) Partizan	Solna, Sweden
19:00	Winsnes 17'	Report	Lazović 36'	Stadium: Råsunda Stadium; Attendance: 20,000; Referee: Lutz Michael Fröhlich (Germany)

7 August 2002 2nd leg	Partizan (Federal Republic of Yugoslavia)	4–0 (5–1 agg.)	(Sweden) Hammarby	Belgrade, Serbia and Montenegro
20:45	Ivić 49'; Lazović 54'; Iliev 64'; Ilić 75'	Report		Stadium: Stadion FK Partizan; Attendance: 15,000; Referee: Stefano Farina (Italy)

==== Third Qualifying Round ====
14 August 2002 1st leg	Partizan (Federal Republic of Yugoslavia)	0–3	(Germany) Bayern Munich	Belgrade, Serbia and Montenegro
20:30		Report	Tarnat 21'; Jeremies 70'; Pizarro 77'	Stadium: Stadion FK Partizan; Attendance: 30,000; Referee: Stuart Dougal (Scotland)

27 August 2002 2nd leg	Bayern Munich (Germany)	3–1 (6–1 agg.)	(Federal Republic of Yugoslavia) Partizan	Munich, Germany
20:30	Ballack 26'; Élber 71'; Salihamidžić 73' (pen.)	Report	Čakar 72'	Stadium: Olympic Stadium; Attendance: 25,000; Referee: Claude Colombo (France)

=== UEFA Cup ===
==== First round ====
19 September 2002 1st leg	Sporting (Portugal)	1–3	(Federal Republic of Yugoslavia) Partizan	Lisbon, Portugal
22:00	Toñito 25'	Report	Hugo Viana (o.g.) 11'; Delibašić 35'; Iliev 78'	Stadium: Estádio José Alvalade; Attendance: 15,000; Referee: Fiorenzo Treossi (Italy)

3 October 2002 2nd leg	Partizan (Federal Republic of Yugoslavia)	3–3 (a.e.t.) (6–4 agg.)	(Portugal) Sporting	Belgrade, Serbia and Montenegro
20:00	Delibašić 78'; Živković 110'; Čakar 117'	Report	Toñito 13'; Kutuzov 55'; Contreras 82'	Stadium: Stadion FK Partizan; Attendance: 0 Referee: Fritz Stuchlik (Austria)

==== Second round ====
31 October 2002 1st leg	Partizan (Federal Republic of Yugoslavia)	3–1	(Czech Republic) Slavia Prague	Belgrade, Serbia and Montenegro
18:30	Lazović 4'; S.Ilić 32'; Vukić 69'	Report	Dostálek 56'	Stadium: Stadion FK Partizan; Attendance: 18,000; Referee: Paulo Manuel Gomes Costa (Portugal)

14 November 2002 2nd leg	Slavia Prague (Czech Republic)	5–1 (a.e.t.) (6–4 agg.)	(Federal Republic of Yugoslavia) Partizan	Prague, Czech Republic
20:00	Vachoušek 10', 40'; Petrouš 87'; Gedeon 93'; Adauto 110'	Report	Ivić 89'	Stadium: Strahov; Attendance: 7,000; Referee: Georgios Douros (Greece)
