= 2003–04 UEFA Champions League qualifying rounds =

European football tournament

The 2003–04 UEFA Champions League qualifying rounds decided 16 of the 32 teams which played in the group stage. All times are CEST (UTC+2).

== Teams ==
Key to colours
Qualify for the group stage
Eliminated in the Third qualifying round; Advanced to the UEFA Cup first round

Third qualifying round
Team	Coeff.
(Italy) Lazio	106.155
(Spain) Deportivo La Coruña	98.769
(Spain) Celta Vigo	86.769
(Turkey) Galatasaray	78.495
(Germany) Borussia Dortmund	70.566
(England) Chelsea	70.170
(Greece) AEK Athens	56.391
(Ukraine) Dynamo Kyiv	55.291
(Netherlands) Ajax	54.749
(England) Newcastle United	51.170
(Scotland) Rangers	50.187
(Czech Republic) Sparta Prague	49.975
(France) Marseille	49.734
(Russia) Lokomotiv Moscow	49.520
(Belgium) Club Brugge	44.250
(Switzerland) Grasshopper	33.125
(Portugal) Benfica	30.791
Austria Wien	13.687

Second qualifying round
Team	Coeff.
(Scotland) Celtic	57.187
(Belgium) Anderlecht	49.250
(Czech Republic) Slavia Prague	48.975
(Norway) Rosenborg	42.787
(Poland) Wisła Kraków	33.812
(Croatia) Dinamo Zagreb	32.312
(Austria) GAK	26.687
(Ukraine) Shakhtar Donetsk	22.291
(Serbia and Montenegro) Partizan	20.915
(Denmark) Copenhagen	20.687
(Israel) Maccabi Tel Aviv	18.999
(Bulgaria) CSKA Sofia	18.332
(Hungary) MTK Hungária	13.395
(Russia) CSKA Moscow	12.520
(Sweden) Djurgårdens IF	11.795
(Romania) Rapid București	11.478
(Slovenia) Maribor	8.666
(Slovakia) Žilina	6.832

First qualifying round
Team	Coeff.
(Finland) HJK	10.604
(Latvia) Skonto	6.332
(Cyprus) Omonia	5.082
(Republic of Ireland) Bohemians	3.665
(Moldova) Sheriff Tiraspol	2.916
(Georgia (country)) Dinamo Tbilisi	2.833
(Bosnia and Herzegovina) Leotar	2.166
(Lithuania) Kaunas	1.999
(Iceland) KR	1.749
(North Macedonia) Vardar	1.748
(Belarus) BATE Borisov	1.708
(Malta) Sliema Wanderers	1.499
(Armenia) Pyunik	1.082
(Wales) Barry Town	1.082
(Albania) Tirana	0.915
(Estonia) Flora	0.832
(Northern Ireland) Glentoran	0.749
(Luxembourg) Grevenmacher	0.666
(Faroe Islands) HB	0.582
(Kazakhstan) Irtysh	0.250

== First qualifying round ==
The draw for this round was performed on 20 June 2003 in Nyon, Switzerland.

=== Seeding ===
Seeded	Unseeded
(Finland) HJK (Latvia) Skonto (Cyprus) Omonia (Republic of Ireland) Bohemians (Moldova) Sheriff Tiraspol (Georgia (country)) Dinamo Tbilisi (Bosnia and Herzegovina) Leotar (Lithuania) Kaunas (Iceland) KR (North Macedonia) Vardar	(Belarus) BATE Borisov (Malta) Sliema Wanderers (Armenia) Pyunik (Wales) Barry Town (Albania) Tirana (Estonia) Flora (Northern Ireland) Glentoran (Luxembourg) Grevenmacher (Faroe Islands) HB (Kazakhstan) Irtysh

=== Summary ===
The first legs were played on 16 July, and the second legs were played on 23 July 2003.

Team 1	Agg.	Team 2	1st leg	2nd leg
Pyunik (Armenia)	2–1	(Iceland) KR	1–0	1–1
Sheriff Tiraspol (Moldova)	2–1	(Estonia) Flora	1–0	1–1
HB (Faroe Islands)	1–5	(Lithuania) Kaunas	0–1	1–4
BATE Borisov (Belarus)	1–3	(Republic of Ireland) Bohemians	1–0	0–3
Vardar (North Macedonia)	4–2	(Wales) Barry Town	3–0	1–2
Grevenmacher (Luxembourg)	0–2	(Bosnia and Herzegovina) Leotar	0–0	0–2
Glentoran (Northern Ireland)	0–1	(Finland) HJK	0–0	0–1
Sliema Wanderers (Malta)	3–3 (a)	(Latvia) Skonto	2–0	1–3
Omonia (Cyprus)	2–1	(Kazakhstan) Irtysh	0–0	2–1
Dinamo Tbilisi (Georgia (country))	3–3 (2–4 p)	(Albania) Tirana	3–0	0–3 (a.e.t.)

=== Matches ===
16 July 2003
17:15

Pyunik (Armenia)	1–0	(Iceland) KR
Pachajyan 61'	Report

Vazgen Sargsyan Republican Stadium, Yerevan
Attendance: 15,000
Referee: Johny Ver Eecke (Belgium)
23 July 2003
22:00

KR (Iceland)	1–1	(Armenia) Pyunik
Davíðsson 82' (pen.)	Report	Ag. Mkrtchyan 73'

Laugardalsvöllur, Reykjavík (Note: KR played their home match at Laugardalsvöllur in Reykjavík, instead of their regular venue KR-völlur in Reykjavík.)
Attendance: 2,069
Referee: Andrejs Sipailo (Latvia)

Pyunik won 2–1 on aggregate.

16 July 2003
19:00

Sheriff Tiraspol (Moldova)	1–0	(Estonia) Flora
Tudor 88'	Report

Sheriff Stadium, Tiraspol
Attendance: 6,150
Referee: Imankhan Sultani (Azerbaijan)
23 July 2003
18:00

Flora (Estonia)	1–1	(Moldova) Sheriff Tiraspol
Viikmäe 88'	Report	Nesteruk 80'

Lilleküla Stadium, Tallinn
Attendance: 800
Referee: Mike Dean (England)

Sheriff Tiraspol won 2–1 on aggregate.

16 July 2003
20:00

HB (Faroe Islands)	0–1	(Lithuania) Kaunas
	Report	Opic 75'

Tórsvøllur, Tórshavn (Note: HB played their home match at Tórsvøllur stadium, instead of their regular home venue Gundadalur stadium.)
Attendance: 600
Referee: Igor Ishchenko (Ukraine)
23 July 2003
17:30

Kaunas (Lithuania)	4–1	(Faroe Islands) HB
Beniušis 5', 77'; Kančelskis 36'; Opic 40'	Report	Jacobsen 9'

Darius and Girėnas Stadium, Kaunas
Attendance: 3,500
Referee: Alojzije Šupraha (Croatia)

Kaunas won 5–1 on aggregate.

16 July 2003
17:00

BATE Borisov (Belarus)	1–0	(Republic of Ireland) Bohemians
Lashankow 25'	Report

City Stadium, Borisov
Attendance: 4,500
Referee: Jaroslav Jára (Czech Republic)
23 July 2003
20:45

Bohemians (Republic of Ireland)	3–0	(Belarus) BATE Borisov
Caffrey 38'; Ryan 45'; Crowe 58'	Report

Dalymount Park, Dublin
Attendance: 5,300
Referee: Ivan Dobrinov (Bulgaria)

Bohemians won 3–1 on aggregate.

16 July 2003
20:00

Vardar (North Macedonia)	3–0	(Wales) Barry Town
Wandeir 38', 70'; Ristovski 49'	Report

Philip II Arena, Skopje
Attendance: 3,000
Referee: Asaf Kenan (Israel)
23 July 2003
21:00

Barry Town (Wales)	2–1	(North Macedonia) Vardar
Jarman 1'; Moralee 63'	Report	Rogério 60'

Jenner Park Stadium, Barry
Attendance: 1,125
Referee: Sergey Kapanin (Kazakhstan)

Vardar won 4–2 on aggregate.

16 July 2003
20:00

Grevenmacher (Luxembourg)	0–0	(Bosnia and Herzegovina) Leotar
	Report

Stade Josy Barthel, Luxembourg City (Note: Grevenmacher played their home match at Stade Josy Barthel in Luxembourg City, instead of their regular home venue Op Flohr Stadion in Grevenmacher.)
Attendance: 500
Referee: János Megyebíró (Hungary)
23 July 2003
17:00

Leotar (Bosnia and Herzegovina)	2–0	(Luxembourg) Grevenmacher
Kerkez 23', 83'	Report

Stadion Police, Trebinje
Attendance: 3,100
Referee: Anton Helesteanu (Romania)

Leotar won 2–0 on aggregate.

16 July 2003
20:30

Glentoran (Northern Ireland)	0–0	(Finland) HJK
	Report

The Oval, Belfast
Attendance: 2,525
Referee: Darius Miezelis (Lithuania)
23 July 2003
18:00

HJK (Finland)	1–0	(Northern Ireland) Glentoran
Mäkelä 72'	Report

ISS Stadion, Vantaa (Note: HJK played their home matches at ISS Stadion in Vantaa, instead of their regular venue Finnair Stadium in Helsinki.)
Attendance: 4,270
Referee: Mirosław Ryszka (Poland)

HJK won 1–0 on aggregate.

16 July 2003
17:30

Sliema Wanderers (Malta)	2–0	(Latvia) Skonto
Bogdanović 62'; Dončić 68' (pen.)	Report

Hibernians Ground, Paola
Attendance: 473
Referee: Dejan Stanišić (Serbia and Montenegro)
23 July 2003
17:30

Skonto (Latvia)	3–1	(Malta) Sliema Wanderers
Buitkus 14'; Verpakovskis 64'; Dedura 70'	Report	Brincat 90+2'

Skonto Stadium, Riga
Attendance: 3,250
Referee: Mustafa Çulcu (Turkey)

3–3 on aggregate; Sliema Wanderers won on away goals.

16 July 2003
19:00

Omonia (Cyprus)	0–0	(Kazakhstan) Irtysh
	Report

GSP Stadium, Nicosia
Attendance: 15,550
Referee: Siniša Zrnić (Bosnia and Herzegovina)
23 July 2003
15:00

Irtysh (Kazakhstan)	1–2	(Cyprus) Omonia
Agaýew 21'	Report	Rauffmann 61'; Georgiou 90+5'

Central Stadium, Pavlodar
Attendance: 12,000
Referee: Petteri Kari (Finland)

Omonia won 2–1 on aggregate.

16 July 2003
17:00

Dinamo Tbilisi (Georgia (country))	3–0	(Albania) Tirana
Melkadze 6'; Anchabadze 45+1'; Daraselia 50' (pen.)	Report

Boris Paichadze National Stadium, Tbilisi
Attendance: 0 (Note: Dinamo Tbilisi played behind closed doors as UEFA prohibiting any spectrators cause in previous season in Tbilisi was riots in match against Slovan.)
Referee: David Malcolm (Northern Ireland)
23 July 2003
18:00

Tirana (Albania)	3–0 (a.e.t.)	(Georgia (country)) Dinamo Tbilisi
Liçi 11'; Fortuzi 64'; Halili 77'	Report
Penalties
Patushi (penalty scored); Liçi (penalty scored); Dede (penalty scored); Halili (penalty scored)	4–2	(penalty missed) Gogoberishvili; (penalty scored) Samkharadze; (penalty scored) Khizaneishvili; (penalty missed) Akhalaia

Qemal Stafa Stadium, Tirana
Attendance: 2,100
Referee: Alan Kelly (Republic of Ireland)

3–3 on aggregate; Tirana won 4–2 on penalties.

== Second qualifying round ==
The draw for this round was performed on 20 June 2003 in Nyon, Switzerland.

=== Seeding ===
Seeded		Unseeded	
(Scotland) Celtic (Belgium) Anderlecht (Czech Republic) Slavia Prague (Norway) Rosenborg (Poland) Wisła Kraków (Croatia) Dinamo Zagreb (Austria) GAK	(Ukraine) Shakhtar Donetsk (Serbia and Montenegro) Partizan (Denmark) Copenhagen (Israel) Maccabi Tel Aviv (Bulgaria) CSKA Sofia (Hungary) MTK Hungária (Russia) CSKA Moscow	(Sweden) Djurgårdens IF (Romania) Rapid București (Finland) HJK (Slovenia) Maribor (Slovakia) Žilina (Malta) Sliema Wanderers (Cyprus) Omonia	(Republic of Ireland) Bohemians (Moldova) Sheriff Tiraspol (Albania) Tirana (Bosnia and Herzegovina) Leotar (Lithuania) Kaunas (Armenia) Pyunik (North Macedonia) Vardar

Notes

1. ^{†} Winners of the previous qualifying round whose identity was not known at the time of the draw. Teams in italics defeated a team with a higher coefficient in the previous qualifying round, thus effectively taking the coefficient of their defeated opponent in the draw for this round.

=== Summary ===
The first legs were played on 30 July, and the second legs were played on 6 August 2003.

Team 1	Agg.	Team 2	1st leg	2nd leg
MTK Hungária (Hungary)	3–2	(Finland) HJK	3–1	0–1
Pyunik (Armenia)	0–3	(Bulgaria) CSKA Sofia	0–2	0–1
Kaunas (Lithuania)	0–5	(Scotland) Celtic	0–4	0–1
Leotar (Bosnia and Herzegovina)	1–4	(Czech Republic) Slavia Prague	1–2	0–2
Sheriff Tiraspol (Moldova)	0–2	(Ukraine) Shakhtar Donetsk	0–0	0–2
Žilina (Slovakia)	2–1	(Israel) Maccabi Tel Aviv	1–0	1–1
Bohemians (Republic of Ireland)	0–5	(Norway) Rosenborg	0–1	0–4
Maribor (Slovenia)	2–3	(Croatia) Dinamo Zagreb	1–1	1–2
CSKA Moscow (Russia)	2–3	(North Macedonia) Vardar	1–2	1–1
Rapid București (Romania)	2–3	(Belgium) Anderlecht	0–0	2–3
Partizan (Serbia and Montenegro)	3–3 (a)	(Sweden) Djurgårdens IF	1–1	2–2
Wisła Kraków (Poland)	7–4	(Cyprus) Omonia	5–2	2–2
Copenhagen (Denmark)	10–1	(Malta) Sliema Wanderers	4–1	6–0
Tirana (Albania)	2–7	(Austria) GAK	1–5	1–2

=== Matches ===
30 July 2003
20:00

MTK Hungária (Hungary)	3–1	(Finland) HJK
Welton 37', 42'; Rednic 90+3'	Report	Kottila 53'

Hidegkuti Nándor Stadion, Budapest
Attendance: 1,213
Referee: Darko Čeferin (Slovenia)
6 August 2003
18:00

HJK (Finland)	1–0	(Hungary) MTK Hungária
Mäkelä 63'	Report

ISS Stadion, Vantaa
Attendance: 2,650
Referee: Dejan Delević (Serbia and Montenegro)

MTK Hungária won 3–2 on aggregate.

30 July 2003
18:00

Pyunik (Armenia)	0–2	(Bulgaria) CSKA Sofia
	Report	Yanchev 20'; Mukasi 48'

Vazgen Sargsyan Republican Stadium, Yerevan
Attendance: 13,000
Referee: Martin Ingvarsson (Sweden)
6 August 2003
19:30

CSKA Sofia (Bulgaria)	1–0	(Armenia) Pyunik
Léo Lima 90+1'	Report

Balgarska Armia Stadium, Sofia
Attendance: 6,500
Referee: Dougie McDonald (Scotland)

CSKA Sofia won 3–0 on aggregate.

30 July 2003
20:00

Kaunas (Lithuania)	0–4	(Scotland) Celtic
	Report	Larsson 12'; Sutton 28'; Maloney 54'; Miller 86'

Darius and Girėnas Stadium, Kaunas
Attendance: 3,500
Referee: Paulo Paraty (Portugal)
6 August 2003
20:45

Celtic (Scotland)	1–0	(Lithuania) Kaunas
Gvildys 21' (o.g.)	Report

Celtic Park, Glasgow
Attendance: 40,104
Referee: Jacek Granat (Poland)

Celtic won 5–0 on aggregate.

30 July 2003
18:00

Leotar (Bosnia and Herzegovina)	1–2	(Czech Republic) Slavia Prague
Delibašić 43' (pen.)	Report	Adauto 16'; Dostálek 49'

Stadion Police, Trebinje
Attendance: 4,525
Referee: Serhiy Shebek (Ukraine)
6 August 2003
19:00

Slavia Prague (Czech Republic)	2–0	(Bosnia and Herzegovina) Leotar
Kuka 42'; Skácel 73'	Report

Stadion Evžena Rošického, Prague
Attendance: 6,154
Referee: Mikko Vuorela (Finland)

Slavia Prague won 4–1 on aggregate.

30 July 2003
19:00

Sheriff Tiraspol (Moldova)	0–0	(Ukraine) Shakhtar Donetsk
	Report

Sheriff Stadium, Tiraspol
Attendance: 10,224
Referee: Karel Vidlak (Czech Republic)
6 August 2003
18:00

Shakhtar Donetsk (Ukraine)	2–0	(Moldova) Sheriff Tiraspol
Vukić 60'; Brandão 89'	Report

Shakhtar Stadium, Donetsk
Attendance: 31,600
Referee: Bertrand Layec (France)

Shakhtar Donetsk won 2–0 on aggregate.

30 July 2003
20:15

Žilina (Slovakia)	1–0	(Israel) Maccabi Tel Aviv
Bažík 86'	Report

Štadión pod Dubňom, Žilina
Attendance: 5,988
Referee: Tonny Kolbech Poulsen (Denmark)
6 August 2003
16:30

Maccabi Tel Aviv (Israel)	1–1	(Slovakia) Žilina
Paintsil 25'	Report	Sninský 16'

Szusza Ferenc Stadion, Budapest, Hungary (Note: Due to security issues caused by the Second Intifada, Israeli teams were required to play their home matches at neutral venues until further notice. As a result, Maccabi Tel Aviv played their home match at Szusza Ferenc Stadion, Budapest, Hungary, instead of their regular stadium, Bloomfield Stadium, Tel Aviv.)
Attendance: 491
Referee: Hermann Albrecht (Germany)

Žilina won 2–1 on aggregate.

30 July 2003
20:45

Bohemians (Republic of Ireland)	0–1	(Norway) Rosenborg
	Report	Karadas 35'

Dalymount Park, Dublin
Attendance: 7,930
Referee: Bernhard Brugger (Austria)
6 August 2003
20:45

Rosenborg (Norway)	4–0	(Republic of Ireland) Bohemians
Karadas 43'; Brattbakk 51'; Strand 68'; Johnsen 76'	Report

Lerkendal Stadion, Trondheim
Attendance: 15,911
Referee: Ruud Bossen (Netherlands)

Rosenborg won 5–0 on aggregate.

30 July 2003
20:15

Maribor (Slovenia)	1–1	(Croatia) Dinamo Zagreb
Pekič 36'	Report	Kranjčar 33'

Ljudski vrt, Maribor
Attendance: 6,443
Referee: Eric Blareau (Belgium)
6 August 2003
20:45

Dinamo Zagreb (Croatia)	2–1	(Slovenia) Maribor
Mijatović 59'; Drpić 63'	Report	Balajić 10'

Stadion Maksimir, Zagreb
Attendance: 8,790
Referee: Costas Kapitanis (Cyprus)

Dinamo Zagreb won 3–2 on aggregate.

30 July 2003
18:00

CSKA Moscow (Russia)	1–2	(North Macedonia) Vardar
Samodin 89'	Report	Grozdanoski 54'; Wandeir 64'

Dynamo Stadium, Moscow
Attendance: 12,000
Referee: Stefano Farina (Italy)
6 August 2003
18:00

Vardar (North Macedonia)	1–1	(Russia) CSKA Moscow
Wandeir 64'	Report	Gogniyev 30'

Philip II Arena, Skopje
Attendance: 12,000
Referee: Victor José Esquinas Torres (Spain)

Vardar won 3–2 on aggregate.

30 July 2003
20:00

Rapid București (Romania)	0–0	(Belgium) Anderlecht
	Report

Stadionul Național, Bucharest (Note: Rapid București played their home match at Stadionul Național, instead of their regular venue Stadionul Giulești.)
Attendance: 12,000
Referee: Anton Stredák (Slovakia)
6 August 2003
20:30

Anderlecht (Belgium)	3–2	(Romania) Rapid București
Jestrović 50'; Zetterberg 52'; Seol 75'	Report	Ilyés 42'; Bratu 45'

Constant Vanden Stock Stadium, Brussels
Attendance: 22,432
Referee: Emil Bozinovski (Macedonia)

Anderlecht won 3–2 on aggregate.

30 July 2003
20:00

Partizan (Serbia and Montenegro)	1–1	(Sweden) Djurgårdens IF
Ilić 59'	Report	Makondele 72'

Partizan Stadium, Belgrade
Attendance: 23,400
Referee: Attila Hanacsek (Hungary)
6 August 2003
20:45

Djurgårdens IF (Sweden)	2–2	(Serbia and Montenegro) Partizan
Johansson 10'; Wowoah 77'	Report	Ilić 61'; Malbaša 66' (pen.)

Råsunda Stadium, Solna (Note: Djurgårdens IF played their home match at Råsunda Stadium in Solna, as their regular home venue Stockholm Olympic Stadium did not meet UEFA criteria.)
Attendance: 28,287
Referee: Yuri Baskakov (Russia)

3–3 on aggregate; Partizan won on away goals.

30 July 2003
19:00

Wisła Kraków (Poland)	5–2	(Cyprus) Omonia
Żurawski 12', 49'; Frankowski 19'; Baszczyński 45+1'; Dubicki 70'	Report	Rauffmann 76' (pen.), 86' (pen.)

Stadion Miejski, Kraków
Attendance: 6,500
Referee: Ceri Richards (Wales)
6 August 2003
19:00

Omonia (Cyprus)	2–2	(Poland) Wisła Kraków
Rauffmann 16'; Charalambous 51'	Report	Żurawski 6', 72'

GSP Stadium, Nicosia
Attendance: 12,100
Referee: Philippe Leuba (Switzerland)

Wisła Kraków won 7–4 on aggregate.

30 July 2003
20:00

Copenhagen (Denmark)	4–1	(Malta) Sliema Wanderers
Zuma 24'; Røll 28' (pen.), 65'; Jónsson 45'	Report	Dončić 50'

Parken Stadium, Copenhagen
Attendance: 14,197
Referee: Alexandru Tudor (Romania)
6 August 2003
20:45

Sliema Wanderers (Malta)	0–6	(Denmark) Copenhagen
	Report	Jónsson 17', 41'; Nørregaard 36'; Chetcuti 46' (o.g.); Zuma 49'; Røll 68'

Ta' Qali National Stadium, Ta' Qali
Attendance: 735
Referee: Andy D'Urso (England)

Copenhagen won 10–1 on aggregate.

30 July 2003
18:00

Tirana (Albania)	1–5	(Austria) GAK
Xhafa 5'	Report	Bazina 14'; Aufhauser 32'; Naumoski 41', 82'; Standfest 56'

Qemal Stafa Stadium, Tirana
Attendance: 7,200
Referee: Georgios Douros (Greece)
6 August 2003
20:30

GAK (Austria)	2–1	(Albania) Tirana
Sick 16'; Kollmann 75'	Report	Agolli 90+2'

Stadion Graz-Liebenau, Graz
Attendance: 5,090
Referee: Kristinn Jakobsson (Iceland)

GAK won 7–2 on aggregate.

== Third qualifying round ==
The draw for this round was performed on 25 July 2003 in Nyon, Switzerland.

=== Seeding ===
Seeded		Unseeded	
(Italy) Lazio (Spain) Deportivo La Coruña (Spain) Celta Vigo (Turkey) Galatasaray (Germany) Borussia Dortmund (England) Chelsea (Scotland) Celtic (Greece) AEK Athens	(Ukraine) Dynamo Kyiv (Netherlands) Ajax (England) Newcastle United (Scotland) Rangers (Czech Republic) Sparta Prague (France) Marseille (Russia) Lokomotiv Moscow (Belgium) Anderlecht	(Czech Republic) Slavia Prague (Belgium) Club Brugge (Norway) Rosenborg (Poland) Wisła Kraków (Switzerland) Grasshopper (Croatia) Dinamo Zagreb (Portugal) Benfica (Austria) GAK	(Ukraine) Shakhtar Donetsk (Serbia and Montenegro) Partizan (Denmark) Copenhagen (Slovakia) Žilina (Bulgaria) CSKA Sofia; Austria Wien (Hungary) MTK Hungária (North Macedonia) Vardar

Notes

1. ^{†} Winners of the previous qualifying round whose identity was not known at the time of the draw. Teams in italics defeated a team with a higher coefficient in the previous qualifying round, thus effectively taking the coefficient of their defeated opponent in the draw for this round.

=== Summary ===
The first legs were played on 12 and 13 August, and the second legs were played on 26 and 27 August 2003.

Team 1	Agg.	Team 2	1st leg	2nd leg
Vardar (North Macedonia)	4–5	(Czech Republic) Sparta Prague	2–3	2–2
MTK Hungária (Hungary)	0–5	(Scotland) Celtic	0–4	0–1
Rangers (Scotland)	3–2	(Denmark) Copenhagen	1–1	2–1
Austria Wien	0–1	(France) Marseille	0–1	0–0
Club Brugge (Belgium)	3–3 (4–2 p)	(Germany) Borussia Dortmund	2–1	1–2 (a.e.t.)
Shakhtar Donetsk (Ukraine)	2–3	(Russia) Lokomotiv Moscow	1–0	1–3
Lazio (Italy)	4–1	(Portugal) Benfica	3–1	1–0
Dynamo Kyiv (Ukraine)	5–1	(Croatia) Dinamo Zagreb	3–1	2–0
Rosenborg (Norway)	0–1	(Spain) Deportivo La Coruña	0–0	0–1
Grasshopper (Switzerland)	2–3	(Greece) AEK Athens	1–0	1–3
Žilina (Slovakia)	0–5	(England) Chelsea	0–2	0–3
Celta Vigo (Spain)	3–2	(Czech Republic) Slavia Prague	3–0	0–2
Partizan (Serbia and Montenegro)	1–1 (4–3 p)	(England) Newcastle United	0–1	1–0 (a.e.t.)
Galatasaray (Turkey)	6–0	(Bulgaria) CSKA Sofia	3–0	3–0
Anderlecht (Belgium)	4–1	(Poland) Wisła Kraków	3–1	1–0
GAK (Austria)	2–3	(Netherlands) Ajax	1–1	1–2 (a.e.t.)

=== Matches ===
13 August 2003
20:00

Vardar (North Macedonia)	2–3	(Czech Republic) Sparta Prague
Rogério 61'; Georgievski 74'	Report	Poborský 37', 89'; Gluščević 41'

Philip II Arena, Skopje
Attendance: 14,000
Referee: Terje Hauge (Norway)
26 August 2003
17:00

Sparta Prague (Czech Republic)	2–2	(North Macedonia) Vardar
Poborský 33'; Sionko 85'	Report	Georgievski 31'; Chinedu 66'

Stadion Letná, Prague
Attendance: 12,345
Referee: Stéphane Bré (France)

Sparta Prague won 5–4 on aggregate.

13 August 2003
20:15

MTK Hungária (Hungary)	0–4	(Scotland) Celtic
	Report	Larsson 17'; Agathe 36'; Petrov 70'; Sutton 90+1'

Ferenc Puskás Stadium, Budapest
Attendance: 4,773
Referee: Kim Milton Nielsen (Denmark)
27 August 2003
20:45

Celtic (Scotland)	1–0	(Hungary) MTK Hungária
Sutton 14'	Report

Celtic Park, Glasgow
Attendance: 41,720
Referee: Wolfgang Stark (Germany)

Celtic won 5–0 on aggregate.

13 August 2003
20:45

Rangers (Scotland)	1–1	(Denmark) Copenhagen
Løvenkrands 8'	Report	Jónsson 50'

Ibrox Stadium, Glasgow
Attendance: 47,401
Referee: Manuel Mejuto González (Spain)
27 August 2003
20:05

Copenhagen (Denmark)	1–2	(Scotland) Rangers
Álvaro 83'	Report	Arteta 52' (pen.); Arveladze 87'

Parken Stadium, Copenhagen
Attendance: 35,519
Referee: Željko Širić (Croatia)

Rangers won 3–2 on aggregate.

13 August 2003
20:30

Austria Wien	0–1	(France) Marseille
	Report	Sychev 4'

Ernst-Happel-Stadion, Vienna
Attendance: 28,300
Referee: Luis Medina Cantalejo (Spain)
27 August 2003
20:50

Marseille (France)	0–0	Austria Wien
	Report

Stade Vélodrome, Marseille
Attendance: 41,253
Referee: Anders Frisk (Sweden)

Marseille won 1–0 on aggregate.

13 August 2003
20:30

Club Brugge (Belgium)	2–1	(Germany) Borussia Dortmund
Čeh 33'; Verheyen 44'	Report	Amoroso 53'

Jan Breydel Stadium, Bruges
Attendance: 19,364
Referee: Pierluigi Collina (Italy)
27 August 2003
20:30

Borussia Dortmund (Germany)	2–1 (a.e.t.)	(Belgium) Club Brugge
Amoroso 3'; Ewerthon 86'	Report	Mendoza 26'
Penalties
Amoroso (penalty missed); Bergdølmo (penalty missed); Koller (penalty scored); Fernández (penalty scored)	2–4	(penalty scored) Simons; (penalty scored) Čeh; (penalty scored) De Cock; (penalty scored) Mendoza

Westfalenstadion, Dortmund
Attendance: 62,000
Referee: Mike RIley (England)

3–3 on aggregate; Club Brugge won 4–2 on penalties.

13 August 2003
18:00

Shakhtar Donetsk (Ukraine)	1–0	(Russia) Lokomotiv Moscow
Vukić 56' (pen.)	Report

Shakhtar Stadium, Donetsk
Attendance: 31,700
Referee: Massimo Busacca (Switzerland)
27 August 2003
18:00

Lokomotiv Moscow (Russia)	3–1	(Ukraine) Shakhtar Donetsk
Ashvetia 28', 45'; Ignashevich 85' (pen.)	Report	Lewandowski 71'

Lokomotiv Stadium, Moscow
Attendance: 29,000
Referee: Alain Hamer (Luxembourg)

Lokomotiv Moscow won 3–2 on aggregate.

13 August 2003
21:00

Lazio (Italy)	3–1	(Portugal) Benfica
Corradi 16'; Fiore 54'; Mihajlović 80'	Report	Simão 65'

Stadio Olimpico, Rome
Attendance: 57,996
Referee: Herbert Fandel (Germany)
27 August 2003
22:00

Benfica (Portugal)	0–1	(Italy) Lazio
	Report	César 28'

Estádio do Bessa, Porto (Note: Benfica played their home match at Estádio do Bessa in Porto, as their temporary home venue Estádio Nacional in Lisbon did not meet UEFA criteria.)
Attendance: 16,974
Referee: Urs Meier (Switzerland)

Lazio won 4–1 on aggregate.

12 August 2003
19:00

Dynamo Kyiv (Ukraine)	3–1	(Croatia) Dinamo Zagreb
Fedorov 32'; Leko 39'; Husyev 82'	Report	Kranjčar 42'

Valeriy Lobanovskyi Dynamo Stadium, Kyiv
Attendance: 8,200
Referee: Stuart Dougal (Scotland)
27 August 2003
20:45

Dinamo Zagreb (Croatia)	0–2	(Ukraine) Dynamo Kyiv
	Report	Shatskikh 47'; Diogo Rincón 70'

Stadion Maksimir, Zagreb
Attendance: 22,000
Referee: Claus Bo Larsen (Denmark)

Dynamo Kyiv won 5–1 on aggregate.

13 August 2003
20:45

Rosenborg (Norway)	0–0	(Spain) Deportivo La Coruña
	Report

Lerkendal Stadion, Trondheim
Attendance: 21,166
Referee: Graham Poll (England)
26 August 2003
21:30

Deportivo La Coruña (Spain)	1–0	(Norway) Rosenborg
Luque 16'	Report

Estadio Riazor, A Coruña
Attendance: 22,153
Referee: Ľuboš Micheľ (Slovakia)

Deportivo La Coruña won 1–0 on aggregate.

13 August 2003
20:30

Grasshopper (Switzerland)	1–0	(Greece) AEK Athens
Núñez 83'	Report

Hardturm, Zürich
Attendance: 12,400
Referee: Éric Poulat (France)
27 August 2003
20:30

AEK Athens (Greece)	3–1	(Switzerland) Grasshopper
Katsouranis 20'; Liberopoulos 25'; Castillo 39' (o.g.)	Report	Núñez 68'

Leoforos Alexandras Stadium, Athens
Attendance: 16,045
Referee: Lucílio Batista (Portugal)

AEK Athens won 3–2 on aggregate.

13 August 2003
20:15

Žilina (Slovakia)	0–2	(England) Chelsea
	Report	Guðjohnsen 42'; Drahno 76' (o.g.)

Štadión pod Dubňom, Žilina
Attendance: 6,160
Referee: René Temmink (Netherlands)
26 August 2003
20:45

Chelsea (England)	3–0	(Slovakia) Žilina
Johnson 32'; Huth 67'; Hasselbaink 79'	Report

Stamford Bridge, London
Attendance: 23,408
Referee: Kyros Vassaras (Greece)

Chelsea won 5–0 on aggregate.

12 August 2003
21:30

Celta Vigo (Spain)	3–0	(Czech Republic) Slavia Prague
Mostovoi 17'; Jesuli 49'; Edu 55'	Report

Balaídos, Vigo
Attendance: 13,500
Referee: Gilles Veissière (France)
27 August 2003
20:45

Slavia Prague (Czech Republic)	2–0	(Spain) Celta Vigo
Skácel 18'; Hrdlička 30'	Report

Stadion Evžena Rošického, Prague
Attendance: 8,091
Referee: Frank De Bleeckere (Belgium)

Celta Vigo won 3–2 on aggregate.

13 August 2003
20:30

Partizan (Serbia and Montenegro)	0–1	(England) Newcastle United
	Report	Solano 39'

Partizan Stadium, Belgrade
Attendance: 27,300
Referee: Vladimír Hriňák (Slovakia)
27 August 2003
20:45

Newcastle United (England)	0–1 (a.e.t.)	(Serbia and Montenegro) Partizan
	Report	Iliev 50'
Penalties
Shearer (penalty missed); Dyer (penalty missed); Woodgate (penalty missed); Amoebi (penalty scored); LuaLua (penalty scored); Jenas (penalty scored); Hughes (penalty missed)	3–4	(penalty missed) Malbaša; (penalty scored) Nađ; (penalty missed) Stojanoski; (penalty scored) Čakar; (penalty missed) Iliev; (penalty scored) Ilić; (penalty scored) Ćirković

St James' Park, Newcastle upon Tyne
Attendance: 37,293
Referee: Jan Wegereef (Netherlands)

1–1 on aggregate; Partizan won 4–3 on penalties.

13 August 2003
20:00

Galatasaray (Turkey)	3–0	(Bulgaria) CSKA Sofia
Hasan Şaş 3'; Hakan Şükür 6'; Arif 37'	Report

Atatürk Olympic Stadium, Istanbul
Attendance: 66,300
Referee: Markus Merk (Germany)
27 August 2003
19:30

CSKA Sofia (Bulgaria)	0–3	(Turkey) Galatasaray
	Report	César Prates 28'; Sabri 53'; Arif 86'

Stadion Balgarska Armia, Sofia
Attendance: 9,600
Referee: Domenico Messina (Italy)

Galatasaray won 6–0 on aggregate.

13 August 2003
20:30

Anderlecht (Belgium)	3–1	(Poland) Wisła Kraków
Jestrović 13'; Lovre 38'; Dindane 59'	Report	Żurawski 77' (pen.)

Constant Vanden Stock Stadium, Brussels
Attendance: 17,630
Referee: Arturo Daudén Ibáñez (Spain)
26 August 2003
21:00

Wisła Kraków (Poland)	0–1	(Belgium) Anderlecht
	Report	Dindane 85'

Stadion Miejski, Kraków
Attendance: 8,200
Referee: Konrad Plautz (Austria)

Anderlecht won 4–1 on aggregate.

12 August 2003
20:30

GAK (Austria)	1–1	(Netherlands) Ajax
Pogatetz 56'	Report	Sneijder 76'

Stadion Graz-Liebenau, Graz
Attendance: 12,382
Referee: Massimo De Santis (Italy)
27 August 2003
20:30

Ajax (Netherlands)	2–1 (a.e.t./s.g.)	(Austria) GAK
Ibrahimović 15'; Galásek 103' (pen.)	Report	Kollmann 40'

Amsterdam Arena, Amsterdam
Attendance: 47,870
Referee: Valentin Ivanov (Russia)

Ajax won 3–2 on aggregate.
