= 1998–99 FK Partizan season =

Partizan
1998–99 season
- President: Ivan Ćurković
- Head coach: Ljubiša Tumbaković
- First League of FR Yugoslavia: 1st (champions)
- FR Yugoslavia Cup: Runners-up
- Cup Winners' Cup: Second round
- Top goalscorer: League: Saša Ilić (13 goals); All: Saša Ilić (20)

The 1998–99 season was the 53rd season in FK Partizan's existence. This article shows player statistics and matches that the club played during the 1998–99 season.

== Players ==
=== Squad information ===
Note: Flags indicate national team as defined under FIFA eligibility rules; some limited exceptions apply. Players may hold more than one non-FIFA nationality.

No.	Pos.	Nation	Player
1	GK	BIH	Nikola Damjanac
15	GK	YUG	Radiša Ilić
2	DF	YUG	Vuk Rašović
13	DF	YUG	Đorđe Svetličić
3	DF	YUG	Branko Savić
6	DF	MKD	Marjan Gerasimovski
5	DF	YUG	Zoltan Sabo
9	DF	MKD	Milan Stojanoski
24	DF	BIH	Predrag Pažin
20	DF	YUG	Mladen Krstajić
—	DF	YUG	Dragoljub Jeremić
23	MF	YUG	Ljubiša Ranković

No.	Pos.	Nation	Player
—	MF	YUG	Goran Arnaut
8	MF	YUG	Goran Trobok
16	MF	YUG	Goran Obradović
7	MF	YUG	Darko Tešović
4	MF	YUG	Igor Duljaj
18	MF	YUG	Vladimir Ivić
22	MF	YUG	Saša Ilić
17	FW	YUG	Ivica Iliev
—	FW	YUG	Srđan Baljak
—	FW	YUG	Dejan Živković
14	FW	YUG	Mateja Kežman
10	FW	YUG	Nenad Bjeković

== Competitions ==
=== First League of FR Yugoslavia ===
Pos	Team	Pld	W	D	L	GF	GA	GD	Pts	Qualification or relegation
1	Partizan (C)	24	21	3	0	59	11	+48	66	Qualification for Champions League first qualifying round
2	Obilić	24	20	4	0	61	9	+52	64	Excluded from European competitions (Note: Obilić was excluded from the UEFA competitions as its owner, Željko "Arkan" Ražnatović, was charged with war crimes. Vojvodina were awarded Obilić's European berth.)
3	Red Star Belgrade	24	15	6	3	54	18	+36	51	Qualification for UEFA Cup qualifying round
4	Vojvodina	24	13	3	8	45	22	+23	42	Qualification for UEFA Cup qualifying round
5	Rad	24	11	7	6	26	26	0	40	

Updated to match(es) played on unknown. Source: RSSSF.org
Rules for classification: 1) points; 2) goal difference; 3) number of goals scored.
(C) Champions
Notes:

1	Partizan	4–1	Radnički Niš	Belgrade
	Ilić; Trobok; Vuković			Stadium: Partizan Stadium

2	Priština	0–4	Partizan	Priština
			Ivić; Trobok; Gerasimovski

3	Partizan	4–1	Železnik	Belgrade
	Obradović; Rašović			Stadium: Partizan Stadium

4	Spartak Subotica	0–4	Partizan	Subotica
			Stojisavljević; Ilić; Tomić; Obradović

5	Partizan	3–1	Mogren	Belgrade
	Ivić; Ilić			Stadium: Partizan Stadium

6	Radnički Kragujevac	1–2	Partizan	Kragujevac
			Kežman

20 September 1998 7	Partizan	2–1	Crvena zvezda	Belgrade
	Tomić 27'; Kežman 87'		Ljubojević 70'	Stadium: Partizan Stadium; Attendance: 25,000

8	Sartid	1–2	Partizan	Smederevo
			Rašović; Ivić

9	Partizan	2–0	Vojvodina	Belgrade
	Ivić; Ilić			Stadium: Partizan Stadium

10	Zemun	1–2	Partizan	Belgrade
			Obradović; Tomić

11	Partizan	4–0	Rad	Belgrade
	Rašović; Iliev; Vuković; Ivić			Stadium: Partizan Stadium

12	Proleter Zrenjanin	0–1	Partizan	Zrenjanin
			Ilić

13	Partizan	1–0	Budućnost Podgorica	Belgrade
	Ilić			Stadium: Partizan Stadium

14	Partizan	3–0	Hajduk Kula	Belgrade
	Ilić; Iliev			Stadium: Partizan Stadium

15	Milicionar	0–1	Partizan	Belgrade
			Vuković

16	Partizan	0–0	Obilić	Belgrade
				Stadium: Partizan Stadium

17	OFK Beograd	2–3	Partizan	Belgrade
			Rašović; Iliev

18	Radnički Niš	0–0	Partizan	Niš
				Stadium: Čair Stadium

19	Partizan	3–0	Priština	Belgrade
	Ivić; Vuković; Ilić			Stadium: Partizan Stadium

20	Železnik	0–2	Partizan	Belgrade
			Kežman; Ilić

21	Partizan	5–1	Spartak Subotica	Belgrade
	Ivić; Kežman; Stojanoski; Iliev; Ilić			Stadium: Partizan Stadium

22	Mogren	0–3	Partizan	Budva
			Ivić; Bjeković; Ilić

23	Partizan	2–0	Radnički Kragujevac	Belgrade
	Rašović; Ivić			Stadium: Partizan Stadium

20 March 1999 24	Crvena zvezda	2–2	Partizan	Belgrade
	Pjanović 7'; Gojković 30'		Kežman 34'; Ilić 53'	Stadium: Marakana; Attendance: 40,000

The championship was stopped on 14 May 1999, because of the NATO bombing of Yugoslavia, after 24 rounds.

=== FR Yugoslavia Cup ===
1 August 1998 First round	ČSK Čelarevo	3–4	Partizan	Čelarevo

2 September 1998 Second round 1st leg	Partizan	2–0	Radnički Kragujevac	Belgrade
				Stadium: Stadion FK Partizan

23 September 1998 Second round 2nd leg	Radnički Kragujevac	0–1 (0 – 3 agg.)	Partizan	Kragujevac

10 October 1998 Quarter-finals 1st leg	Partizan	3–0	Zemun	Belgrade
				Stadium: Stadion FK Partizan

28 October 1998 Quarter-finals 2nd leg	Zemun	1–4 (1 – 7 agg.)	Partizan	Belgrade

23 June 1999 Semi-finals	Partizan	1–0	Obilić	Belgrade
	Kežman 5'			Stadium: Stadion FK Partizan

26 June 1999 Final	Crvena zvezda	4–2	Partizan	Belgrade
	Škorić 16', 62' (pen.); Pjanović 18'; Gojković 86'		Rašović 37' (pen.); Kežman 45'	Stadium: Marakana; Attendance: 35,000; Referee: Krstivoje Filipović

=== Cup Winners' Cup ===
==== Qualifying round ====
13 August 1998 1st leg	Partizan (Federal Republic of Yugoslavia)	2–0	(Georgia (country)) Dinamo Batumi	Belgrade, FR Yugoslavia
	Bjeković 18'; Ilić 34'			Stadium: Partizan Stadium; Attendance: 8,500; Referee: Dick J.H. Van Egmond (Netherlands)

27 August 1998 2nd leg	Dinamo Batumi (Georgia (country))	1–0 (1 – 2 agg.)	(Federal Republic of Yugoslavia) Partizan	Batumi, Georgia
	Sichinava 28'			Stadium: Tsentral Stadium; Attendance: 10,000; Referee: Pasquale Rodomonti (Italy)

==== First round ====
17 September 1998 1st leg	Newcastle United (England)	2–1	(Federal Republic of Yugoslavia) Partizan	Newcastle upon Tyne, England
	Shearer 12'; Dabizas 71'		Rašović 68' (pen.)	Stadium: St James' Park; Attendance: 26,599

1 October 1998 2nd leg	Partizan (Federal Republic of Yugoslavia)	1–0 (a 2 – 2 agg.)	(England) Newcastle United	Belgrade, FR Yugoslavia
	Rašović 53' (pen.)			Stadium: Partizan Stadium; Attendance: 28,000

==== Second round ====
22 October 1998 1st leg	Lazio (Italy)	0–0	(Federal Republic of Yugoslavia) Partizan	Rome, Italy
20:45		Report		Stadium: Stadio Olimpico; Attendance: 24,966; Referee: René Temmink (Netherlands)

5 November 1998 2nd leg	Partizan (Federal Republic of Yugoslavia)	2–3 (2 – 3 agg.)	(Italy) Lazio	Belgrade, FR Yugoslavia
20:45	Krstajić 18'; Iliev 85'	Report	Salas 43' (pen.), 76'; Stanković 67'	Stadium: Partizan Stadium; Attendance: 32,000; Referee: Fritz Stuchlik (Austria)

== See also ==
- List of FK Partizan seasons
- List of unbeaten football club seasons
