= Georgakis =

Georgakis is a Greek name, which can be used as either a surname or a given name. Notable people with this name include:

- Christos Georgakis, American chemical engineer
- George Georgakis, founder of AMG International
- Georgios Georgakis (born 1991), Greek professional basketball player
- Ioannis Georgakis, founder of the Hellenic Foundation for Culture
- Kostas Georgakis (1948–1970), Greek student of geology who set himself on fire in protest against Georgios Papadopoulos
- Nikos Georgakis, Greek actor and director

As a first name

- Georgakis Kapsokalyvas (born c. 1800), fighter in the Greek Revolution

== See also ==
- Georgiou
- Georgescu
- Gheorghiu
- Iordache (< Georgakis, Georgakes)
