= Dejan Živković =

Dejan Živković may refer to:

- Dejan Živković (footballer, born 1979), Serbian football striker
- Dejan Živković (footballer, born 1982), Serbian football midfielder
