= Georgios Georgiou (disambiguation) =

Georgios Georgiou (born 1979) is a Greek footballer.

George, Georgios or Giorgos Georgiou (Greek: Γεώργιος or Γιώργος Γεωργίου) may also refer to:

== Politicians ==
- Georgios Georgiou (Greek politician) (1936–2025), a member of the European Parliament for Greece from 2004 to 2009 for LAOS
- Georgios Georgiou (Cypriot politician, 1949) (1949–2018), a member of the parliament of Cyprus from 1981 to 1984 for DISY in Larnaca
- Georgios Georgiou (Cypriot politician, 1957) (born 1957), a member of the parliament of Cyprus from 2001 to 2021 for DISY in Famagusta
- Giorgos Georgiou (Cypriot politician, 1961) (born 1961), a member of the parliament of Cyprus from 2016 to 2021 for AKEL in Lemessos
- Giorgos Georgiou (Cypriot politician) (born 1963), Member of the European Parliament

== Other ==
- Giorgos Georgiou (1947–2023), Greek TV and radio personality
- George Georgiou (born 1961), British photographer
- George Georgiou (footballer) (born 1972), English footballer
- Giorgos Georgiou (art director), winner of 2 Hellenic Film Academy Awards in 2012 for Christmas Tango
- George Georgiou (actor), British actor known for Game of Thrones
- Georgios P. Georgiou (born 1987), Cypriot Greek linguist

== See also ==
- Georgios (disambiguation)
- George (disambiguation)
- Georgiou
