= Gheorghiu =

Gheorghiu (pronounced [ɡe̯orˈɡi.u]) is a Romanian surname, of Greek language origin, deriving from Greek Γεωργίου. Among Greeks, the Greek surname form Γεωργίου is usually or always Romanized in other ways, either as Gheorghiou or Georgiou.

The Gheorghiu surname is patronymic (from the Greek genitive), meaning "son of George". In Romanian, the name George exists in two spellings and two different pronunciations: George with two soft g sounds (George, written as g in Romanian) and Gheorghe with two hard g sounds (Gheorghe, written as gh in Romanian, as in Italian and some other languages), the hard g sounds that are also found in Gheorghiu.

In Romanian, the name George is a two-syllable name pronounced jor'je (written George), not a one-syllable name as in English jorj (written George). The name Gheorghe is also two-syllable, pronounced with hard g sounds: gior'ge, and with an added "i" (gior-) sound not found in jor'je.

People with the surname Gheorghiu include:

- Adrian Gheorghiu (born 1981), Romanian footballer
- Angela Gheorghiu (born 1965), Romanian operatic soprano
- Bogdan Gheorghiu (born 1975), Romanian politician
- Constantin Virgil Gheorghiu (1916–1992), Romanian writer
- Cristache Gheorghiu (born 1937), Romanian writer and painter
- Cristian Gheorghiu, Romanian contemporary artist
- Dumitru Gheorghiu (1904–1976), Romanian bobsledder
- Ermil Gheorghiu (1896–1977), Romanian Air Force General
- Florin Gheorghiu (born 1944), Romanian chess player
- Gheorghe Gheorghiu-Dej (1901–1965), Romanian communist leader
- Luminița Gheorghiu (1949–2021), Romanian actress
- Mihail Gheorghiu Bujor (1881–1964), Romanian socialist and communist activist
- Natalia Gheorghiu (1914–2001), Moldovan and Soviet pediatric surgeon
- Ștefan Gheorghiu (1926–2010), Romanian violinist
- Ștefan Gheorghiu (1879–1914), Romanian trade unionist
- Tașcu Gheorghiu (1910–1981), Romanian writer and illustrator
- Valentin Gheorghiu (1928–2023), Romanian pianist and composer
- Vasile Gheorghiu (1872–1959), Romanian theologian
- Virgil Gheorghiu (1903–1977), Romanian avant-garde poet

== See also ==
- Georgiou
- Georgescu
- Georgakis
- Iordache (< Georgakis, Georgakes)
