= Străoști =

Străoşti may refer to:

- Străoşti, a village in Dragodana Commune, Dâmboviţa County, Romania
- Străoşti, a village in Iordăcheanu Commune, Prahova County, Romania
