= Borko Veselinović =

Serbian footballer (born 1986)

Personal information
- Date of birth: 6 January 1986 (age 40)
- Place of birth: Priština, SFR Yugoslavia
- Height: 1.77 m (5 ft 10 in)
- Positions: Striker; winger

Youth career
- Partizan

Senior career*
Years	Team	Apps	(Gls)
2003–2008	Partizan	19	(0)
2003–2004	→ Teleoptik (loan)	30	(23)
2005	→ Obilić (loan)	11	(5)
2005–2006	→ Teleoptik (loan)	20	(13)
2006	→ Bežanija (loan)	15	(1)
2007	→ Beira-Mar (loan)	5	(0)
2008–2009	Incheon United	36	(5)
2010	Dalian Shide	5	(0)
2012	Spartak Subotica	6	(0)
2013–2014	Javor Ivanjica	39	(4)
2014–2017	Rad	76	(7)
2017	Zlatibor Čajetina	9	(0)
2018–2019	Rad	15	(0)
2019	Sinđelić Beograd	8	(0)
2020	Lokomotiva Belgrad		
Total		294	(58)

International career
2002–2003	Serbia and Montenegro U17 (Note: Only official UEFA matches included)	6	(0)
2003–2005	Serbia and Montenegro U19	14	(11)
2007	Serbia U21	1	(0)
- * Club domestic league appearances and goals

Borko Veselinović (Serbian Cyrillic: Борко Веселиновић; born 6 January 1986) is a Serbian professional footballer who plays as a striker.

== Club career ==
Veselinović progressed through the youth system of Partizan as one of the club's most promising prospects, breaking into the first-team squad under manager Lothar Matthäus in the second half of the 2002–03 season. He was later assigned to their affiliated club Teleoptik on dual registration, racking up an impressive goals-to-games ratio in the Serbian League Belgrade. In early 2005, Veselinović was loaned to Obilić until the end of the season. He scored five goals in 11 league appearances and helped the side narrowly avoid relegation from the top flight. After returning to Partizan in the 2005–06 season, Veselinović again struggled to receive more playing time, but continued to score regularly for Teleoptik in the Serbian League Belgrade. He later also went on loan to Bežanija and Beira-Mar.

In early 2008, Veselinović was transferred to K League side Incheon United. He spent two seasons with the team before moving to Chinese Super League club Dalian Shide in 2010.

After spending over a year without competitive football, Veselinović signed with Serbian SuperLiga side Spartak Subotica in June 2012.

== International career ==
Veselinović represented FR Yugoslavia at the 2002 UEFA European Under-17 Championship, as the team were eliminated in the quarter-finals by England. He was also a member of the Serbia and Montenegro squad at the 2005 UEFA European Under-19 Championship, as they lost in the semi-finals to England. Veselinović was the tournament's top scorer with five goals.

Veselinović played for the Serbia national under-21 team in their opener of the 2009 UEFA European Under-21 Championship qualification, coming on as a substitute in a 1–1 home draw with Latvia.
