= Georgiou =

Georgiou (Greek: Γεωργίου) is a Greek surname. Notable people with the name include:

- Alessandro Georgiou (born 1992), British politician
- Alex Georgiou (born 1990), Australian athlete in Australian rules football
- Andreas Georgiou (disambiguation)
- Byron Georgiou (born 1950s), American lawyer and activist
- Chourmouzios Georgiou (c. 1770–1840), Greek composer and music teacher
- Costas Georgiou (1951–1976), British Cypriot mercenary
- Eleni Georgiou (born 1985), Greek Olympic synchronized swimmer
- Elisa Georgiou (born 1994), Cypriot model
- Fotis Georgiou (born 1988), Greek footballer
- George Georgiou (disambiguation), several persons with the name
- Georgios Georgiou (disambiguation), several persons with the name, including Giorgos Georgiou
- John Georgiou (born 1975), Australian athlete in Australian rules football
- Kevin Georgiou (born 1985), British rapper known as "K-Koke"
- Lakis Georgiou (born 1938), Greek Olympic sports shooter
- Marios Georgiou (born 1997), Cypriot gymnast
- Michael Georgiou (born 1988), English snooker player
- Nicolas Georgiou (born 1976), Cypriot footballer
- Panikos Georgiou (born 1954), Cypriot football club manager
- Peter Georgiou (born 1974), Australian politician
- Petro Georgiou (1947–2025), Greek-Australian politician
- Savva Georgiou (1933–1992), Cypriot footballer
- Stavros Georgiou (born 1972), Cypriot footballer
- Steven Georgiou (born 1948), British musician formerly known as "Cat Stevens", now Yusuf Islam.
- Vangelis Georgiou (born 1988), Greek footballer

== Companies ==
- Georgiou Group

== See also ==
- Georgi Kinkladze
- Gheorghiu
