= 2008–09 FC Energie Cottbus season =

FC Energie Cottbus
2008–09 season
- Manager: Bojan Prašnikar
- Stadium: Stadion der Freundschaft
- Bundesliga: 16th (relegated)
- DFB-Pokal: Round of 16

During the 2008–09 German football season, FC Energie Cottbus competed in the Bundesliga.

== Season summary ==
Cottbus were relegated after finishing 16th and losing to 1. FC Nürnberg in the relegation play-off. This remains their most recent season in the top flight of German football.

== Competitions ==
=== Bundesliga ===
==== League table ====
Pos	Team	Pld	W	D	L	GF	GA	GD	Pts	Qualification or relegation
14	VfL Bochum	34	7	11	16	39	55	−16	32	
15	Borussia Mönchengladbach	34	8	7	19	39	62	−23	31	
16	Energie Cottbus (R)	34	8	6	20	30	57	−27	30	Qualification to relegation play-offs
17	Karlsruher SC (R)	34	8	5	21	30	54	−24	29	Relegation to 2. Bundesliga
18	Arminia Bielefeld (R)	34	4	16	14	29	56	−27	28	Relegation to 2. Bundesliga

Source: kicker (in German)
Rules for classification: 1) points; 2) goal difference; 3) number of goals scored.
(R) Relegated

==== Results ====
Bundesliga match details
Match	Date	Time	Opponent	Venue	Result F–A	Scorers	Attendance	Referee	Ref.
1	16 August 2008	15:30 CEST	1899 Hoffenheim	Home	0–3		18,370	Winkmann	
2	22 August 2008	20:30 CEST	Hannover 96	Away	0–0		34,636	Sippel	
3	30 August 2008	15:30 CEST	Borussia Dortmund	Home	0–1		18,180	Perl	
4	13 September 2008	15:30 CEST	Werder Bremen	Away	0–3		38,714	Fandel	
5	20 September 2008	15:30 CEST	VfL Bochum	Home	1–1	Sørensen 13'	12,174	Meyer	
6	27 September 2008	15:30 CEST	Hertha BSC	Away	1–0	Jelić 13'	42,297	Aytekin	
7	5 October 2008	17:00 CEST	Hamburger SV	Home	1–2	Jelić 74'	17,007	Schmidt	
8	18 October 2008	15:30 CEST	1. FC Köln	Away	0–1		49,000	Brych	
9	25 October 2008	15:30 CEST	Eintracht Frankfurt	Home	2–3	Rangelov 8', 15'	13,492	Kircher	
10	28 October 2008	20:00 CET	Arminia Bielefeld	Away	1–1	Rangelov 30'	18,200	Rafati	
11	1 November 2008	15:30 CET	Schalke 04	Home	0–2		16,640	Weiner	
12	8 November 2008	15:30 CET	VfL Wolfsburg	Away	0–3		23,010	Wagner	
13	15 November 2008	15:30 CET	Karlsruher SC	Home	1–0	Jelić 80'	12,527	Stark	
14	22 November 2008	15:30 CET	Bayern Munich	Away	1–4	Skela 25'	69,000	Kempter	
15	29 November 2008	15:30 CET	Borussia Mönchengladbach	Away	3–1	Bradley 18' o.g., Sørensen 50', Jula 85'	36,454	Sippel	
16	6 December 2008	15:30 CET	VfB Stuttgart	Home	0–3		13,527	Drees	
17	13 December 2008	15:30 CET	Bayer Leverkusen	Away	1–1	Shao 90'	19,200	Wagner	
18	31 January 2009	15:30 CET	1899 Hoffenheim	Away	0–2		30,150	Gräfe	
19	8 February 2009	17:00 CET	Hannover 96	Home	3–1	Rangelov 39', 69', Angelov 74'	12,980	Gagelmann	
20	15 February 2009	17:00 CET	Borussia Dortmund	Away	1–1	Atan 31'	66,300	Sippel	
21	21 February 2009	15:30 CET	Werder Bremen	Home	2–1	Iliev 51', Rangelov 90'	14,780	Seemann	
22	28 February 2009	15:30 CET	VfL Bochum	Away	2–3	Iliev 2', Jula 50'	18,103	Schmidt	
23	7 March 2009	15:30 CET	Hertha BSC	Home	1–3	Atan 22'	22,500	Fleischer	
24	15 March 2009	17:00 CET	Hamburger SV	Away	0–2		50,121	Aytekin	
25	21 March 2009	15:30 CET	1. FC Köln	Home	0–2		15,650	Brych	
26	4 April 2009	15:30 CEST	Eintracht Frankfurt	Away	1–2	Rangelov 11' pen.	44,800	Gagelmann	
27	11 April 2009	15:30 CEST	Arminia Bielefeld	Home	2–1	Rangelov 44', Angelov 60'	17,150	Wagner	
28	17 April 2009	20:30 CEST	Schalke 04	Away	0–4		60,315	Weiner	
29	26 April 2009	17:00 CEST	VfL Wolfsburg	Home	2–0	Rangelov 72', Skela 86'	15,750	Fleischer	
30	2 May 2009	15:30 CEST	Karlsruher SC	Away	0–0		27,311	Winkmann	
31	9 May 2009	15:30 CEST	Bayern Munich	Home	1–3	Iliev 44'	22,528	Kircher	
32	13 May 2009	20:00 CEST	Borussia Mönchengladbach	Home	0–1		20,850	Meyer	
33	16 May 2009	15:30 CEST	VfB Stuttgart	Away	0–2		55,500	Aytekin	
34	23 May 2009	15:30 CEST	Bayer Leverkusen	Home	3–0	Jula 50', 69', Rivić 64'	20,140	Stark	

==== Relegation play-off ====
Relegation play-off match details
Leg	Date	Time	Opponent	Venue	Result F–A	Scorers	Attendance	Referee	Ref.
First leg	28 May 2009	18:00 CEST	1. FC Nürnberg	Home	0–3		22,528	Meyer	
Second leg	31 May 2009	15:30 CEST	1. FC Nürnberg	Away	0–2 (0–5 agg.)		46,780	Kinhöfer	

=== DFB-Pokal ===
DFB-Pokal match details
Round	Date	Time	Opponent	Venue	Result F–A	Scorers	Attendance	Referee	Ref.
First round	9 August 2008	19:30 CEST	Tennis Borussia Berlin	Away	3–0	Rangelov 20', 72', Jelić 28'	4,000	Hartmann	
Second round	23 September 2008	19:00 CEST	Borussia Mönchengladbach	Home	3–0	Rangelov 42' pen., Skela 73' pen., 89' pen.	9,805	Kempter	
Round of 16	28 January 2009	19:00 CET	Bayer Leverkusen	Away	1–3	Skela 90+1'	16,000	Stark	

== First-team squad ==
Squad at end of season

Note: Flags indicate national team as defined under FIFA eligibility rules; some limited exceptions apply. Players may hold more than one non-FIFA nationality.

No.	Pos.	Nation	Player
1	GK	GER	Gerhard Tremmel
2	DF	GER	Thomas Franke
4	MF	BUL	Stanislav Angelov
5	DF	POL	Mariusz Kukiełka
6	DF	BRA	Vragel da Silva
7	MF	GER	Timo Rost
8	FW	BUL	Dimitar Rangelov
9	FW	ROU	Emil Jula
10	MF	CRO	Stiven Rivić
11	FW	SRB	Ivica Iliev
12	GK	GER	Philipp Pentke
13	MF	ALB	Ervin Skela
14	MF	SRB	Dušan Vasiljević
15	DF	GER	Alexander Bittroff
16	MF	GER	Marco Kurth
17	DF	GER	Daniel Ziebig
18	DF	POL	Łukasz Kanik

No.	Pos.	Nation	Player
19	FW	GER	Marc-Philipp Zimmermann
20	MF	CHN	Shao Jiayi
21	DF	MNE	Savo Pavićević (Note: Pavićević was born in Kikinda, SFR Yugoslavia (now Serbia), but also qualified to represent Montenegro internationally and made his international debut for Montenegro in March 2007.)
23	GK	BIH	Tomislav Piplica
25	DF	CZE	Jan Rajnoch (on loan from Mladá Boleslav)
26	FW	GER	Nils Petersen
27	DF	ROU	Ovidiu Burcă
28	DF	BIH	Ivan Radeljić (Note: Radeljić was born in Imotski, SFR Yugoslavia (now Croatia), but also qualified to represent Bosnia and Herzegovina internationally and made his international debut for Bosnia and Herzegovina in 2007.)
29	FW	DEN	Dennis Sørensen
30	FW	SRB	Branko Jelić
31	MF	GER	Michael Lerchl (Note: Lerchl was born in Windhoek, Namibia, but also qualified to represent Germany internationally and represented Germany at U-16, U-17, U-18 and U-20 level.)
32	FW	BRA	Adi
33	DF	CRO	Mario Cvitanović
34	DF	TUR	Çağdaş Atan
36	DF	GER	Peter Hackenberg
37	MF	GER	Christian Müller

=== Left club during season ===
Note: Flags indicate national team as defined under FIFA eligibility rules; some limited exceptions apply. Players may hold more than one non-FIFA nationality.

No.	Pos.	Nation	Player
3	MF	FRA	Christian Bassila (to Guingamp)
22	FW	GER	Danny Galm (to Stuttgarter Kickers)

No.	Pos.	Nation	Player
24	DF	MKD	Igor Mitreski (on loan to Germinal Beerschot)
