= Bojan Zavišić =

Serbian footballer

Personal information
- Full name: Bojan Zavišić
- Date of birth: 9 August 1979 (age 47)
- Place of birth: Belgrade, SFR Yugoslavia
- Height: 1.77 m (5 ft 9 1/2 in)
- Position: Right back

Senior career*
| Years | Team | Apps | (Gls) |
| 1999–2002 | Teleoptik | 82 | (1) |
| 2002–2004 | Partizan | 12 | (0) |
| 2004 | → Sutjeska Nikšić (loan) | 13 | (1) |
| 2004 | Terek Grozny | 0 | (0) |
| 2005 | Zeta | 22 | (0) |
| 2006 | Obilić | 12 | (1) |
| 2006–2007 | Banat Zrenjanin | 25 | (0) |
| 2007–2008 | Smederevo | 10 | (0) |
| 2009–2010 | Čukarički | 32 | (2) |
| 2010 | Okzhetpes | 14 | (0) |
| Total | | 222 | (5) |
- * Club domestic league appearances and goals

Bojan Zavišić (Serbian Cyrillic: Бојан Завишић; born 9 August 1979) is a Serbian retired footballer.

== Club career ==
Zavišić was promoted to the first team of Partizan in the 2002–03 campaign, previously playing for their satellite club Teleoptik. After winning the national championship in his first season with Partizan, Zavišić was also part of the squad that qualified for the group stage of the 2003–04 UEFA Champions League. In the 2004 winter transfer window, Zavišić was loaned to Sutjeska Nikšić until the end of the 2003–04 season. Zavišić also played with Banat Zrenjanin, Smederevo and Čukarički in the Serbian SuperLiga. Zavišić last played for Okzhetpes during the 2010 Kazakhstan Premier League.

== Honours ==
Partizan

- First League of Serbia and Montenegro (1): 2002–03

== Personal life ==
His father Ilija was also a Partizan player and youth system coach.
