= Ivica Iliev =

Serbian footballer (born 1979)

Ivica Iliev Ивица Илиев
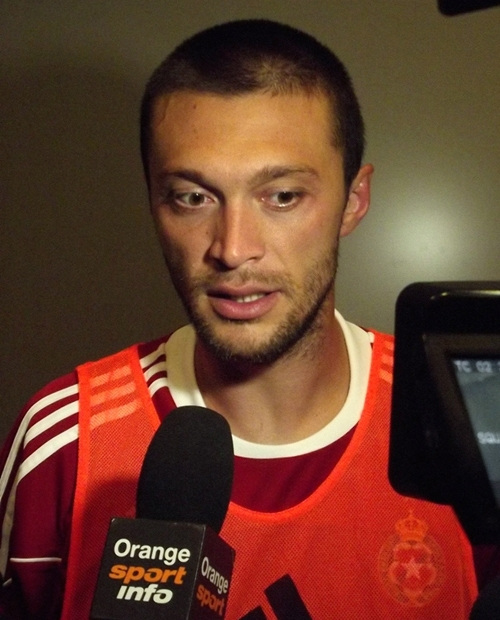
- Iliev with Wisła Kraków in 2011

Personal information
- Full name: Ivica Iliev
- Date of birth: 27 October 1979 (age 47)
- Place of birth: Belgrade, SR Serbia, SFR Yugoslavia
- Height: 1.82 m (6 ft 0 in)
- Position: Forward

Youth career
- Rad
- 1996–1997: Partizan

Senior career*
| Years | Team | Apps | (Gls) |
| 1997–2004 | Partizan | 150 | (41) |
| 2004–2007 | Messina | 58 | (1) |
| 2006 | → Genoa (loan) | 17 | (3) |
| 2007–2008 | PAOK | 17 | (1) |
| 2008–2009 | Energie Cottbus | 27 | (3) |
| 2009–2010 | Maccabi Tel Aviv | 17 | (3) |
| 2010–2011 | Partizan | 27 | (13) |
| 2011–2013 | Wisła Kraków | 48 | (4) |
| Total | | 361 | (69) |

International career
| 1996 | FR Yugoslavia U16 (Note: Official UEFA matches only) | 3 | (0) |
| 1997 | FR Yugoslavia U18 | 4 | (2) |
| 1998–2001 | FR Yugoslavia U21 | 6 | (1) |
| 2003 | Serbia and Montenegro | 2 | (1) |
- * Club domestic league appearances and goals

Ivica Iliev (Serbian Cyrillic: Ивица Илиев, pronounced [ǐvitsa ilǐev]; born 27 October 1979) is a Serbian former professional footballer who played as a forward.

== Club career ==
=== Partizan ===
After starting out as a youngster at Rad, Iliev joined the youth system of Partizan in January 1996. He made his first-team debut under manager Ljubiša Tumbaković during the 1997–98 season, recording four league appearances in the process. In the 1998–99 season, Iliev scored his first goals for Partizan, including a header in a 3–2 home loss to Lazio in the return leg of the UEFA Cup Winners' Cup second round. He later started playing more regularly, scoring eight league goals in the 1999–2000 season. After the departure of Mateja Kežman that summer, Iliev went on to form a strike partnership with Andrija Delibašić. They became a formidable duo in the following period, as the team won back-to-back championships in 2002 and 2003. In the 2003–04 UEFA Champions League third qualifying round, Iliev scored the only goal in a 1–0 return leg win against Newcastle United at St James' Park, resulting in a 1–1 draw on aggregate. Partizan would go on to win the match 4–3 on penalties, reaching the competition's group stage for the first time in club history.

=== Messina ===
In July 2004, Iliev moved abroad and joined Italian side Messina on a free transfer. He appeared 29 times and scored once in his debut season in Serie A, helping the club to a highest-ever seventh-place finish. In January 2006, after receiving limited playing time, Iliev was loaned to Serie C1 side Genoa until the end of the season, as the club would manage to earn promotion to Serie B via the play-offs. He subsequently returned to Messina, but failed to help the team avoid relegation from the top flight in the 2006–07 campaign, finishing bottom of the table.

=== Greece, Germany, and Israel ===
After three years in Italy, Iliev moved to Greece and signed with PAOK. He scored only one goal in the 2007–08 season, as the club failed to secure a spot in UEFA competitions. In August 2008, Iliev joined German side Energie Cottbus. He managed to score three Bundesliga goals in 27 games during the 2008–09 season. They were eventually relegated from the top flight after losing in the play-offs. In August 2009, Iliev signed with Israeli club Maccabi Tel Aviv on a one-year deal. He quickly became an important part of the team, but suffered an injury in January 2010, causing him to miss the remainder of the 2009–10 season.

=== Return to Partizan ===
On 21 July 2010, Iliev returned to his parent club Partizan on a one-year deal. He scored one goal in the Champions League preliminary phase, helping the side reach the competition's group stage after seven years. With 13 goals, Iliev was the league's joint top scorer, being named in the competition's Team of the Season, while also collecting the double.

=== Wisła Kraków ===
In June 2011, Iliev moved to Poland and signed a two-year contract with Wisła Kraków. He made a career-high 45 appearances across all competitions during his debut season, netting three times. In the 2012–13 campaign, Iliev scored four goals in 24 games, before being released by the Polish side.

== International career ==
Iliev was capped twice for Serbia and Montenegro in 2003. He made his international debut on 30 April, coming on as a substitute for Goran Trobok in a 1–0 away friendly loss to Germany. On 16 November, in his second and final appearance, Iliev replaced Savo Milošević and scored a late goal in a 4–3 away friendly loss against Poland.

== Post-playing career ==
On 27 October 2015, his 36th birthday, Iliev was appointed as sporting director of his parent club Partizan. Some of his most notable signings early on would include Everton Luiz, Leonardo, Léandre Tawamba, and Seydouba Soumah. In March 2019, it was announced that Iliev resigned from his position. He, however, remained in charge for another three years, before resigning for a second time in July 2022.

In September 2024, Iliev returned to Partizan to replace Ivica Kralj as sporting director. Only one month later, Iliev was dismissed from the position by Partizan's newly assembled temporary governing body.

== Career statistics ==
=== Club ===
Appearances and goals by club, season and competition
| Club | Season | League | | | National Cup | | League Cup | | Continental | | Other | | Total | |
| Club | Season | Division | Apps | Goals | Apps | Goals | Apps | Goals | Apps | Goals | Apps | Goals | Apps | Goals |
|---|---|---|---|---|---|---|---|---|---|---|---|---|---|---|
| Partizan | 1997–98 | First League of FR Yugoslavia | 4 | 0 | 0 | 0 | — | | 0 | 0 | — | | 4 | 0 |
| Partizan | 1998–99 | First League of FR Yugoslavia | 15 | 4 | 5 | 1 | — | | 2 | 1 | — | | 22 | 6 |
| Partizan | 1999–2000 | First League of FR Yugoslavia | 29 | 8 | 2 | 0 | — | | 6 | 0 | — | | 37 | 8 |
| Partizan | 2000–01 | First League of FR Yugoslavia | 33 | 10 | 5 | 6 | — | | 4 | 0 | — | | 42 | 16 |
| Partizan | 2001–02 | First League of FR Yugoslavia | 22 | 3 | 2 | 2 | — | | 3 | 1 | — | | 27 | 6 |
| Partizan | 2002–03 | First League of Serbia and Montenegro | 27 | 13 | 2 | 0 | — | | 8 | 2 | — | | 37 | 15 |
| Partizan | 2003–04 | First League of Serbia and Montenegro | 20 | 3 | 1 | 0 | — | | 10 | 1 | — | | 31 | 4 |
| Partizan | Total | | 150 | 41 | 17 | 9 | — | | 33 | 5 | — | | 200 | 55 |
| Messina | 2004–05 | Serie A | 29 | 1 | 4 | 0 | — | | — | | — | | 33 | 1 |
| Messina | 2005–06 | Serie A | 8 | 0 | 0 | 0 | — | | — | | — | | 8 | 0 |
| Messina | 2006–07 | Serie A | 21 | 0 | 5 | 1 | — | | — | | — | | 26 | 1 |
| Messina | Total | | 58 | 1 | 9 | 1 | — | | — | | — | | 67 | 2 |
| Genoa (loan) | 2005–06 | Serie C1 | 17 | 3 | 0 | 0 | — | | — | | 4 | 1 | 21 | 4 |
| PAOK | 2007–08 | Super League Greece | 17 | 1 | 1 | 0 | — | | — | | — | | 18 | 1 |
| Energie Cottbus | 2008–09 | Bundesliga | 27 | 3 | 2 | 0 | — | | — | | 1 | 0 | 30 | 3 |
| Maccabi Tel Aviv | 2009–10 | Israeli Premier League | 17 | 3 | 0 | 0 | 3 | 2 | — | | — | | 20 | 5 |
| Partizan | 2010–11 | Serbian SuperLiga | 27 | 13 | 4 | 1 | — | | 8 | 1 | — | | 39 | 15 |
| Wisła Kraków | 2011–12 | Ekstraklasa | 28 | 1 | 5 | 1 | — | | 12 | 1 | — | | 45 | 3 |
| Wisła Kraków | 2012–13 | Ekstraklasa | 20 | 3 | 4 | 1 | — | | — | | — | | 24 | 4 |
| Wisła Kraków | Total | | 48 | 4 | 9 | 2 | — | | 12 | 1 | — | | 69 | 7 |
| Career total | | | 361 | 69 | 42 | 13 | 3 | 2 | 53 | 7 | 5 | 1 | 464 | 92 |

=== International ===
Appearances and goals by national team and year
| National team | Year | Apps | Goals |
|---|---|---|---|
| Serbia and Montenegro | 2003 | 2 | 1 |
| Total | | 2 | 1 |

== Honours ==
Partizan

- First League of FR Yugoslavia: 1998–99, 2001–02, 2002–03
- FR Yugoslavia Cup: 1997–98, 2000–01
- Serbian SuperLiga: 2010–11
- Serbian Cup: 2010–11

Individual

- Serbian SuperLiga top scorer: 2010–11
- Serbian SuperLiga Team of the Season: 2010–11
