= Ajazdin Nuhi =

Serbian footballer (1979–2026)

Personal information
- Date of birth: 10 October 1979
- Place of birth: Dragash, SAP Kosovo, SR Serbia, SFR Yugoslavia
- Date of death: 10 September 2026 (aged 46)
- Place of death: Belgrade, Serbia
- Height: 1.76 m (5 ft 9 in)
- Position: Midfielder

Senior career*
Years	Team	Apps	(Gls)
1997–2001	Čukarički	56	(4)
2001–2004	Partizan	26	(0)
2003	→ Legia Warsaw (loan)	10	(0)
2004	→ Sartid Smederevo (loan)	10	(0)
2004–2006	Zeta	60	(11)
2006–2009	OFK Beograd	70	(2)
2009–2011	Mogren	51	(3)
2012	Napredak Kruševac	15	(0)
2012–2013	BSK Borča	27	(4)
2013	Kolubara	11	(1)
Total		336	(25)

International career
2001	FR Yugoslavia U21	1	(0)
- * Club domestic league appearances and goals

Ajazdin Nuhi (Serbian Cyrillic: Ајаздин Нухи; 10 October 1979 – 10 September 2026) was a Serbian professional footballer who played as a midfielder.

== Club career ==
Nuhi started his senior career at Čukarički in 1997 where he went onto make over 50 appearances, and was remembered for a combative and relentless playing style and tactical awareness.

He was transferred to Partizan in the summer of 2001, winning the national championship title in his first season at the club. Nuhi played 29 games for them including European games, most notably against Sporting Lisbon.

He joined Legia Warsaw on loan in 2003 then coached by fellow Serbian Dragan Okuka. A technically well trained player, Legia had high expectations however in the end he only made 10 appearances and left shortly after. Nuhi was subsequently loaned out to Sartid Smederevo for the remainder of the 2004 season.

Between 2004 and 2006, Nuhi represented Montenegrin side Zeta, while the club still competed in the First League of Serbia and Montenegro, staying for 2 seasons. He then spent three seasons with OFK Beograd in the Serbian SuperLiga in a squad that was considered promising at the time, and included, among others, Aleksandar Kolarov, Nenad Lalatović and Dalibor Veselinović, which in hindsight is now considered to be OFK's star-studded team.

Between 2009 and 2011, Nuhi played for another Budva-based Montenegrin club Mogren, where he won the league title in 2011; Igor Matić's team finished level with Budućnost Podgorica on 73 points but the title went to Mogren.

Nuhi then went on to play for Serbian clubs Napredak Kruševac and BSK Borča before he ended his playing career at FK Kolubara in 2014.

== International career ==
In 2001, Nuhi was capped once for FR Yugoslavia at under-21 level.

== Personal life and death ==
Nuhi was born on 10 October 1979 in Dragash, in modern day Kosovo.

Nuhi died by suicide at his family home in Borča, on 10 September 2026, at the age of 46.

== Honours ==
Partizan

- First League of FR Yugoslavia: 2001–02

Mogren

- Montenegrin First League: 2010–11
