= Georgescu =

Georgescu is a Romanian surname. Notable people with the surname include:

- Alexandru George (1930–2012; born George-Alexandru Georgescu), Romanian literary historian, novelist, and political writer
- Andrei Georgescu (born 1983), Romanian soccer player
- Călin Georgescu (born 1962), Romanian politician
- Dudu Georgescu (born 1950), Romanian soccer player
- Dumitru Georgescu-Kiriac (1866-1928), Romanian composer and conductor
- Elena Georgescu (born 1964), Romanian coxswain
- Haralamb H. Georgescu (1908–1977), Romanian architect
- George Georgescu (1887-1964), Romanian conductor
- Justin Georgescu (1922-1942), Romanian communist activist and anti-fascist militant
- Lena Georgescu (born 1999), Swiss chess master
- Nicholas Georgescu-Roegen (1906-1994), Romanian economist and statistician
- Paul Georgescu (1923-1989), Romanian literary critic, novelist and communist activist
- Peter Georgescu (born 1939), Romanian American business executive
- Teohari Georgescu (1908-1976), Romanian communist politician
- Vlad Georgescu (1937-1988), Romanian historian and journalist

== Georgesco ==
- Christopher Georgesco

== See also ==
- Gheorghe
- Gheorghiu
