= Michal Drahno =

Slovak footballer

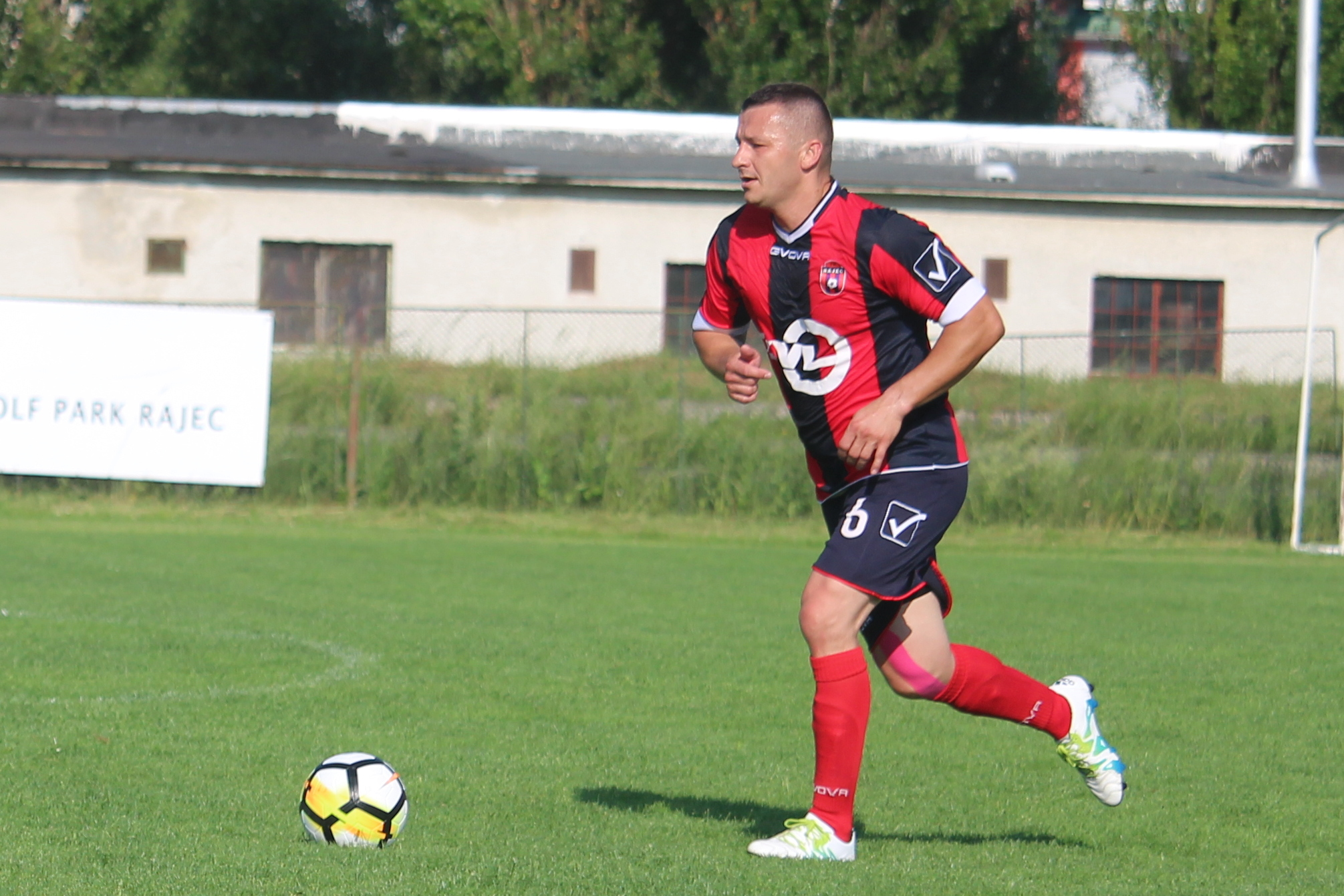

Personal information
- Full name: Michal Drahno
- Date of birth: 28 January 1979 (age 47)
- Place of birth: Žilina, Czechoslovakia
- Height: 1.79 m (5 ft 10 in)
- Position: Defender

Team information
- Current team: MŠK Žilina B - Kotrčina Lúčka
- Number: 3

Youth career
- Žilina

Senior career*
Years	Team	Apps	(Gls)
1997–2004	Žilina	132	(1)
2004–2006	Inter Bratislava	50	(0)
2006–2007	Močenok	14	(0)
2007–2008	Senec	29	(0)
2008–2009	Gorica		
2009	Mura	9	(0)
2010	Bela Krajina	12	(0)
2010–2011	TJ Kotrčina Lúčka		
2011–	Žilina B		
2012	→ Nová Ves nad Váhom (loan)		

International career
- Slovakia U21
- * Club domestic league appearances and goals as of 18 September 2012

Michal Drahno (born 28 January 1979 in Žilina) is a Slovak football defender who currently plays for MŠK Žilina B - Kotrčina Lúčka.
