= Georgakis Kapsokalyvas =

Georgakis Kapsokalyvas (born c. 1800) was a fighter of the Greek Revolution.

== Biography ==
Kapsokalyvas was a native of Zatouna in the eparchy of Karytaina. An excellent captain, he led soldiers under the command of Theodoros Kolokotronis and Dimitris Plapoutas. Saying that "rifles weren't made for shooting the sky but for killing the enemies," Kapsokalyvas trained his men to fight quietly and carefully in order not to waste ammunition, and he made the soldiers compete to see who would kill the most Turks.

== Sources ==
- Photios Chrysanthopoulos, ed. (1888). Βίοι Πελοποννησίων ανδρών και των εξώθεν εις την Πελοπόννησον ελθόντων κληρικών, στρατιωτικών και πολιτικών των αγωνισαμένων τον αγώνα της επαναστάσεως (in Greek). Athens: Σταύρος Ανδρόπουλος, Τυπογραφείο Π. Δ. Σακελλαρίου.
