= Vuk Rašović =

Serbian footballer

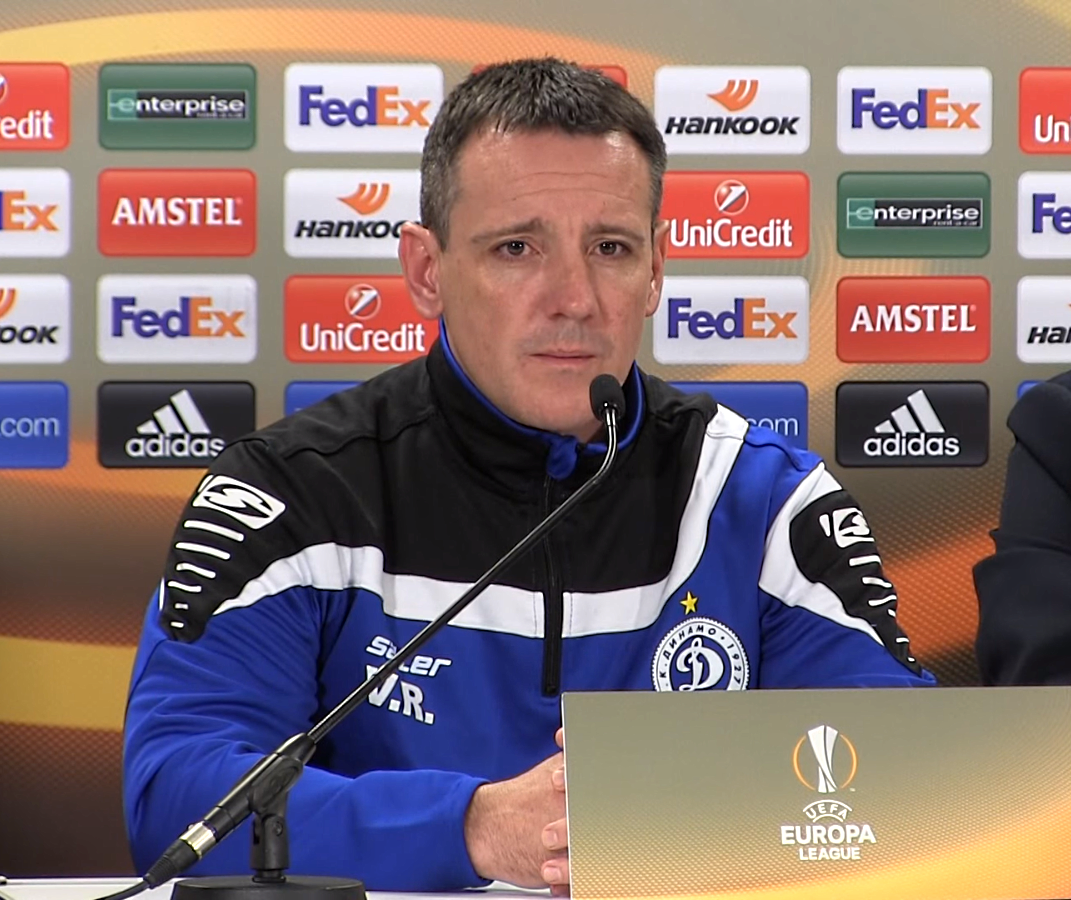
- Rašović in 2015

Personal information
- Full name: Vuk Rašović
- Date of birth: 3 January 1973 (age 53)
- Place of birth: Dortmund, West Germany
- Height: 1.82 m (5 ft 11 1/2 in)
- Position: Defender

Team information
- Current team: Al Taawoun (manager)

Youth career
- Partizan

Senior career*
Years	Team	Apps	(Gls)
1992–1993	Partizan	1	(0)
1993–1997	Rad	82	(6)
1997–1998	Slavia Sofia	24	(0)
1998–2002	Partizan	100	(1)
2002–2003	Krylia Sovetov Samara	11	(0)
2004	Kansas City Wizards	1	(0)

International career
1997–2001	FR Yugoslavia	8	(1)
2001	FR Yugoslavia XI	2	(0)

Managerial career
- 2011–2013: Teleoptik
- 2013: Partizan
- 2015–2016: Dinamo Minsk
- 2017: Napredak Kruševac
- 2017–2018: Al Faisaly
- 2018–2020: Al Dhafra
- 2020–2021: Al Wahda
- 2021–2024: Al-Fayha
- 2024–2026: Kalba FC
- 2026–: Al Taawoun
- * Club domestic league appearances and goals

Vuk Rašović (Serbian Cyrillic: Вук Рашовић; born 3 January 1973) is a Serbian football manager and former player who played as a defender. He is currently manager of Saudi Pro League club Al Taawoun.

== Playing career ==
Rašović started to play for the youth teams of FK Partizan. He played professionally, initially, with FK Rad and Bulgarian Slavia Sofia. Then he returned to FK Partizan where he played from 1998 to 2002. In 2002, he moved to Krylia Sovetov of Russia, where he played between 2002 and 2003. In 2004, he signed with the American MLS team Kansas City Wizards but only played in one game for them during the 2004 season. He retired after the year as a result of suffering an injury.

Rašović played 10 times (2 unofficial) for the FR Yugoslavia national team, making his debut on 14 June 1997 against Egypt.

== Managerial career ==
After retiring, Rašović started his coaching career with Partizan. He became the assistant manager of Goran Stevanović during the 2009–10 and Aleksandar Stanojević in 2010–11 season. Later on, he became a head coach of Partizan's affiliate, Teleoptik.

On 29 April 2013, Rašović was promoted as the new head coach of Partizan. He made his debut by defeating FK Radnički Niš on 2 May 2013.

From December 2014 to 1 May 2015, he was the director of football of Dinamo Minsk.

On 2018, Rašović signed for UAE side Al Dhafra, during his two-year spell, he would get them to qualify for two UAE President's Cup finals, he lost one and the second final was cancelled due to the COVID-19 pandemic in the United Arab Emirates. After two years at Al Dhafra, Rašović signed for Al Wahda. He was later dismissed in March 2021, due to poor results in both the league and cup competitions.

On 21 June 2021, Rašović was appointed as the manager of newly promoted Saudi Arabian side Al-Fayha.

== Managerial statistics ==
As of 12 February 2026

Managerial record by team and tenure
Team	From	To	Record				
Team	From	To	G	W	D	L	Win %
Teleoptik	18 January 2011	29 April 2013	79	23	30	26	29.11
Partizan	29 April 2013	16 December 2013	29	18	5	6	62.07
Dinamo Minsk	11 May 2015	15 July 2016	58	32	15	11	55.17
Napredak Kruševac	30 December 2016	2 June 2017	16	6	3	7	37.50
Al Faisaly	3 June 2017	30 June 2018	32	13	8	11	40.63
Al Dhafra	1 July 2018	5 September 2020	52	19	8	25	36.54
Al Wahda	6 September 2020	13 March 2021	22	7	8	7	31.82
Al-Fayha	1 July 2021	1 July 2024	112	36	33	43	32.14
Kalba FC	1 July 2024	12 February 2026	50	13	13	24	26.00
Total			450	167	123	160	37.11

== Honours ==
=== Player ===
Partizan

- FR Yugoslavia First League: 1992–93, 1998–99, 2001–02
- FR Yugoslavia Cup: 1997–98, 2000–01

=== Manager ===
Partizan

- Serbian SuperLiga: 2012–13

Al-Fayha

- King Cup: 2021–22

Individual

- Saudi Professional League Manager of the Month: August 2021, December 2022
