= Iordache =

Iordache is a Romanian surname; Iordăchescu and Iordăcheanu were coined from Iordache. Iordache is of Greek origin, from Yeorgakis (Γεωργάκης), a patronymic from the Modern Greek first name Yiorgos (Γιώργος), from Ancient Greek Georgios (Γεώργιος), both of which are variants of "George". Antiquated variants include Gheorgache and Iorgache. Notable people with the surname include:

- Adrian Iordache (born 1980), Romanian footballer
- Adrian Dragoș Iordache (born 1981), Romanian footballer
- Eugen Iordache (1922–1988), Romanian footballer
- Ilie Iordache (born 1985), Romanian footballer
- Larisa Iordache (born 1996), Romanian artistic gymnast
- Marin Iorda (born Marin Iordache; 1901–1972), Romanian cartoonist, director, writer and filmmaker
- Marius Iordache (born 1978), Romanian footballer
- Mihai Iordache (born 1967), Romanian jazz musician and composer
- Pompiliu Iordache (1954–2006), Romanian footballer
- Ștefan Iordache (1941–2008), Romanian actor
- Toni Iordache (1942–1988), Romanian musician
- Traian Iordache (1911–1999), Romanian football player and manager
- Vasile Iordache (born 1950), Romanian footballer
- Viorica Iordache (born 1971), Romanian sprint canoer

== See also ==
- Georgakis
- Iordăcheanu
- Jordache
