= Iordăcheanu =

- Commune
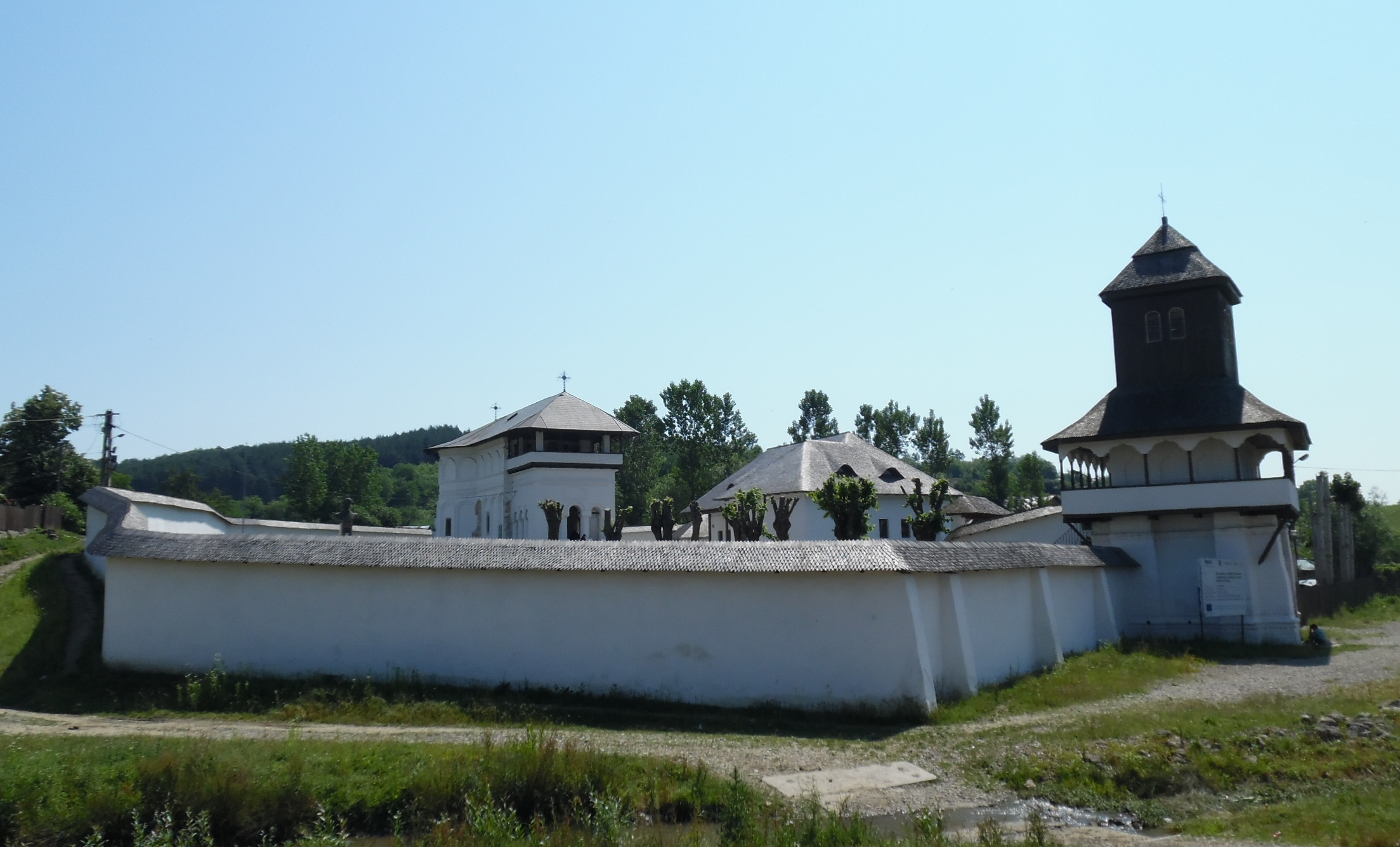
- Vărbila Monastery – panorama

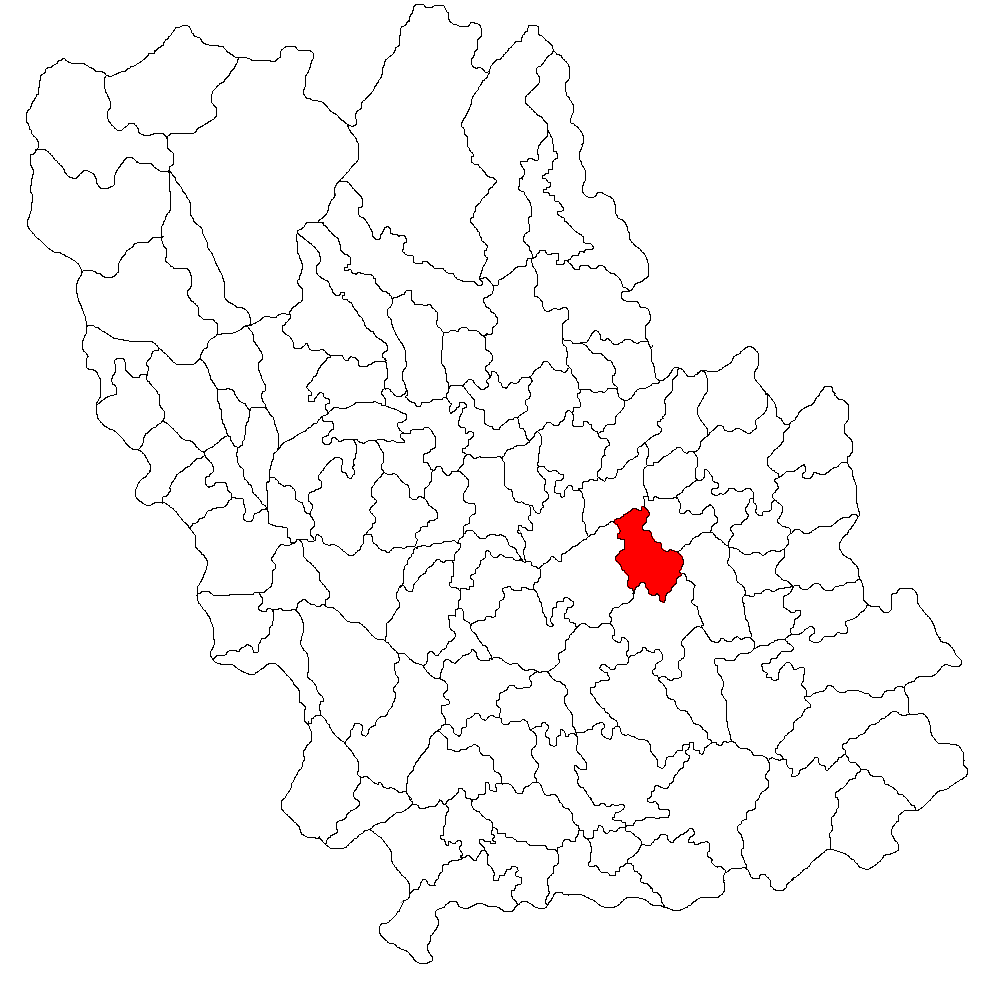
- Location in Prahova County

- Location in Romania
- Coordinates: 45°3′N 26°15′E
- Country: Romania
- County: Prahova

Government
  - Mayor (2020–2024): Aurel Constantin (PNL)
- Area: 54.92 km^{2} (21.20 sq mi)
- Elevation: 155 m (509 ft)
- Population (2021-12-01): 5,107
  - Density: 92.99/km^{2} (240.8/sq mi)
- Time zone: UTC+02:00 (EET)
  - Summer (DST): UTC+03:00 (EEST)
- Postal code: 107310
- Area code: +(40) 244
- Vehicle reg.: PH
- Website: primariaiordacheanu.ro

Iordăcheanu is a commune in Prahova County, Muntenia, Romania. It is composed of six villages: Iordăcheanu, Mocești, Plavia, Străoști, Valea Cucului, and Vărbila.

The commune is situated in the Wallachian Plain, at an altitude of 155 m (509 ft), on the banks of the river Cricovul Sărat. It is located in the central part of Prahova County, 25 km (16 mi) northeast of the county seat, Ploiești.

A statue in honor of Michael the Brave's trek through Iordăcheanu is located in this commune. The name Iordăcheanu comes from a local man named "Iordache".

Vărbila Monastery, built in the 16th century, is located in Vărbila village.

Historical population
Year	Pop.	±%
1992	5,229	—
2002	5,200	−0.6%
2011	5,150	−1.0%
2021	5,107	−0.8%
Source: Census data
