= George Georgiou (footballer) =

English footballer

Personal information
- Full name: George Jordaris Georgiou
- Date of birth: 19 August 1972 (age 54)
- Place of birth: St Pancras, England
- Position: Forward

Senior career*
Years	Team	Apps	(Gls)
–1991	Wembley		
1991–1992	Fulham	4	(0)
1992–	Enfield		
- Dagenham & Redbridge
- Purfleet
- Leyton
- Cheshunt

Managerial career
- 2009–2020: New Salamis
- 2021–2022: FC Romania (Assistant)
- 2022–2023: Colney Heath
- 2023–: FC Romania (Assistant)
- * Club domestic league appearances and goals

George Jordaris Georgiou (born 19 August 1972) is an English former footballer who played as a forward. He played in the Football League for Fulham. He is the Director of Football at Spartan South Midlands League Premier Division side FC Romania.
