= Nicolas Georgiou =

Cypriot footballer (born 1976)

Personal information
- Full name: Nicolas Georgiou
- Date of birth: 24 February 1976 (age 50)
- Place of birth: Famagusta, Cyprus
- Height: 1.76 m (5 ft 9 in)
- Position: Defender

Senior career*
Years	Team	Apps	(Gls)
1996–1998	AEK Larnaca	47	(9)
1998–2008	AC Omonia	229	(13)

International career
1997–2005	Cyprus	20	(1)
- * Club domestic league appearances and goals

Nicolas Georgiou (born 24 February 1976 in Cyprus) is a Cypriot former defender.

== Career ==
Georgiou started his career at AEK Larnaca, before signing for AC Omonia in 1998. His last season at the club was in 2008, when he announced his retirement from the game at the age of 32.
