= Dragoljub Jeremić =

Serbian footballer (1978–2022)

Personal information
- Full name: Dragoljub Jeremić
- Date of birth: 9 August 1978
- Place of birth: Belgrade, SR Serbia, SFR Yugoslavia
- Date of death: 12 March 2022 (aged 43)
- Place of death: Belgrade, Serbia
- Height: 1.80 m (5 ft 11 in)
- Position: Defender

Youth career
- Partizan

Senior career*
| Years | Team | Apps | (Gls) |
| 1997–2007 | Partizan | 59 | (1) |
| 1999–2000 | → Radnički Kragujevac (loan) | 32 | (1) |
| 2005 | → Panserraikos (loan) | 9 | (0) |
| 2006 | → Rabotnički (loan) | 25 | (0) |
| 2008 | Bežanija | 4 | (0) |
| Total | | 129 | (2) |

International career
| 2001 | FR Yugoslavia XI | 4 | (0) |
- * Club domestic league appearances and goals

Dragoljub Jeremić (Serbian Cyrillic: Драгољуб Јеремић; 9 August 1978 – 12 March 2022) was a Serbian footballer who played as a defender.

== Club career ==
Jeremić spent most of his career at Partizan, making 59 league appearances and scoring one goal. He also spent some time on loan to Radnički Kragujevac, Panserraikos (Greece), and Rabotnički (Macedonia). After leaving Partizan, Jeremić briefly played for Bežanija, before retiring.

== International career ==
At international level, Jeremić made four (non-official) appearances for FR Yugoslavia at the Millennium Super Soccer Cup hosted by India in January 2001.

== Death ==
Jeremić died on 12 March 2022, aged 43. A cause of death had not been disclosed, but it was reported that Jeremić spent the last few days of his life in hospital.

== Career statistics ==
| Club | Season | League | |
| Club | Season | Apps | Goals |
|---|---|---|---|
| Partizan | 1997–98 | 4 | 0 |
| Partizan | 1998–99 | 0 | 0 |
| Partizan | 1999–2000 | 0 | 0 |
| Partizan | 2000–01 | 24 | 1 |
| Partizan | 2001–02 | 17 | 0 |
| Partizan | 2002–03 | 6 | 0 |
| Partizan | 2003–04 | 6 | 0 |
| Partizan | 2004–05 | 2 | 0 |
| Partizan | 2005–06 | 0 | 0 |
| Partizan | 2006–07 | 0 | 0 |
| Partizan | Total | 59 | 1 |
| Radnički Kragujevac (loan) | 1999–2000 | 32 | 1 |
| Panserraikos (loan) | 2004–05 | 9 | 0 |
| Rabotnički (loan) | 2005–06 | 14 | 0 |
| Rabotnički (loan) | 2006–07 | 11 | 0 |
| Rabotnički (loan) | Total | 25 | 0 |
| Bežanija | 2007–08 | 4 | 0 |
| Career total | | 129 | 2 |

== Honours ==
Partizan

- First League of FR Yugoslavia: 1998–99, 2001–02, 2002–03
- FR Yugoslavia Cup: 1997–98, 2000–01

Rabotnički

- Macedonian First Football League: 2005–06
