= Dejan Živković (footballer, born 1979) =

Serbian footballer

Personal information
- Full name: Dejan Živković
- Date of birth: 19 August 1979 (age 47)
- Place of birth: Belgrade, SFR Yugoslavia
- Height: 1.83 m (6 ft 0 in)
- Position: Striker

Youth career
- 1987–1997: Partizan

Senior career*
| Years | Team | Apps | (Gls) |
| 1997–1998 | Teleoptik | 16 | (7) |
| 1998–2004 | Partizan | 11 | (0) |
| 2000–2001 | → Teleoptik (loan) | 23 | (9) |
| 2001–2002 | → Zvezdara (loan) | 33 | (12) |
| 2003–2004 | → Sartid Smederevo (loan) | 19 | (6) |
| 2004–2006 | OFK Beograd | 7 | (1) |
| 2006–2007 | Voždovac | 6 | (0) |
| 2007–2008 | Jedinstvo Stara Pazova | 6 | (0) |
| 2008 | Sevojno | 9 | (0) |
| 2008–2009 | Radnički Kragujevac | 7 | (0) |
| 2009 | Bonnyrigg White Eagles | | |
| 2009–2010 | Hajduk Beograd | 6 | (1) |
| 2010 | Konyaspor KIF | 7 | (1) |
| 2011 | Homoljac Žagubica | | |
| 2012 | Popinci | | |
- * Club domestic league appearances and goals

Dejan Živković (Serbian Cyrillic: Дејан Живковић; born 19 August 1979) is a former Serbian professional footballer who played as a striker.

He is best remembered for scoring an extra time goal for Partizan against Sporting Clube de Portugal in the 2002–03 UEFA Cup first round.

== Career ==
Živković started playing football at Partizan at the age of 8. In 1998, he signed a six-year contract for the club. After several years of playing on loans with Teleoptik and Zvezdara, scoring 12 league goals with the latter in the 2001–02 season, Živković returned to Partizan for the 2002–03 season. In the 2003–04 season, he played with Sartid Smederevo, scoring six league goals in 19 appearances. In the following next years, Živković also played with OFK Beograd and Voždovac in the national top flight, before playing in the lower leagues with several clubs.

In 2009, Živković traveled to Australia for a trial with A-League club Central Coast Mariners. However, he signed with the Serbian-backed club Bonnyrigg White Eagles, playing in the NSW Premier League.

In 2012, Živković signed to play with Popinci in the Vojvodina lower league.

== Statistics ==
| Club | Season | League | |
| Club | Season | Apps | Goals |
|---|---|---|---|
| Partizan | 1999–00 | 1 | 0 |
| Zvezdara | 2001–02 | 33 | 12 |
| Partizan | 2002–03 | 10 | 0 |
| Sartid Smederevo | 2003–04 | 19 | 6 |
| OFK Beograd | 2004–05 | 5 | 1 |
| OFK Beograd | 2005–06 | 2 | 0 |
| Voždovac | 2006–07 | 6 | 0 |
