= 2003–04 UEFA Champions League =

European football tournament

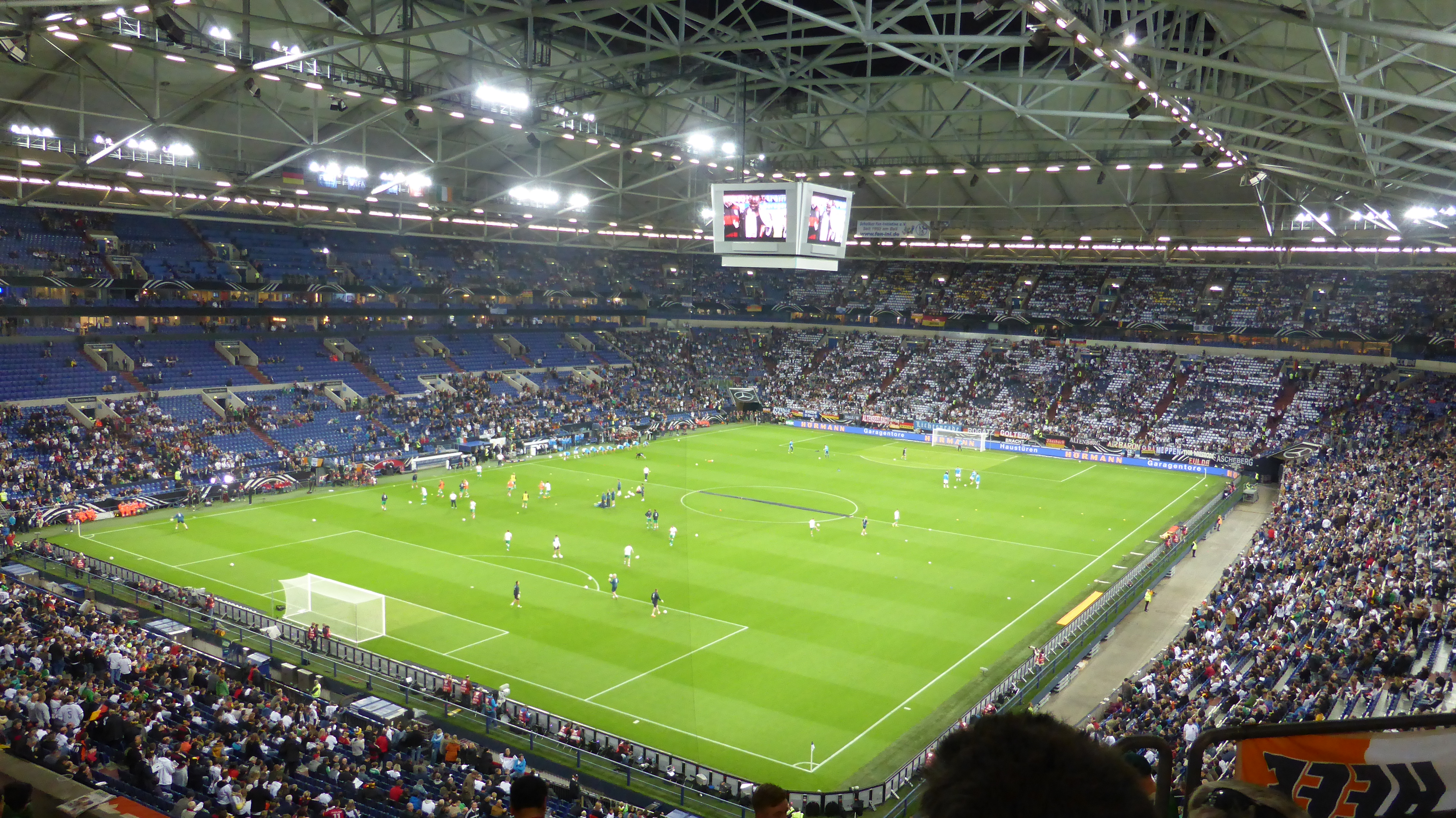
- The Arena AufSchalke in Gelsenkirchen hosted the final

Tournament details
- Dates: Qualifying: 16 July – 27 August 2003; Competition proper: 16 September 2003 – 26 May 2004
- Teams: Competition proper: 32; Total: 72

Final positions
- Champions: (Portugal) Porto (2nd title)
- Runners-up: (France) Monaco

Tournament statistics
- Matches played: 125
- Goals scored: 309 (2.47 per match)
- Attendance: 4,540,677 (36,325 per match)
- Top scorer(s): Fernando Morientes (Monaco); 9 goals

The 2003–04 UEFA Champions League was the 12th season of UEFA's premier European club football tournament, the UEFA Champions League, since its rebranding from the European Cup in 1992, and the 49th tournament overall. This was the first UEFA Champions League edition to feature a new format with a 16-team knockout round instead of a second group stage.

The competition was won by Portugal's Porto, who defeated Monaco of France 3–0 at the Arena AufSchalke in Gelsenkirchen, Germany. This was Portugal's first win since 1987, and Porto's second European trophy in two years, following their UEFA Cup success from the previous season. This was the second consecutive victory in a European cup for Porto coach José Mourinho, who beat Monaco coached by Didier Deschamps, a two-time winner of the competition as a player. As winners of the competition, Porto went on to represent UEFA in the 2004 Intercontinental Cup.

Milan were the defending champions, but were eliminated by Deportivo La Coruña in the quarter-finals.

== Association team allocation ==
A total of 72 teams from 48 UEFA member associations participated in the 2003–04 UEFA Champions League. Liechtenstein (who does not have their own domestic league) as well as Andorra and San Marino did not participate. Also not admitted was Azerbaijan, which was suspended by UEFA. Each association enters a certain number of clubs to the Champions League based on its league coefficient; associations with a higher league coefficient may enter more clubs than associations with a lower league coefficient, but no association may enter more than four teams.

- Associations 1–3 each have four teams qualify.
- Associations 4–6 each have three teams qualify.
- Associations 7–15 each have two teams qualify.
- Associations 16–52 (except Azerbaijan, Liechtenstein, Andorra and San Marino) each have one team qualify.

=== Association ranking ===
For the 2003–04 UEFA Champions League, the associations are allocated places according to their 2002 UEFA country coefficients, which takes into account their performance in European competitions from 1997–98 to 2001–02.

Rank	Association	Coeff.	Teams
1	Spain	68.467	4
2	Italy	58.668	4
3	England	55.459	4
4	Germany	52.990	3
5	France	42.352	3
6	Greece	36.116	3
7	Netherlands	34.165	2
8	Turkey	28.725	2
9	Portugal	28.249	2
10	Russia	27.291	2
11	Czech Republic	26.625	2
12	Scotland	26.125	2
13	Ukraine	25.958	2
14	Belgium	25.525	2
15	Austria	23.250	2
16	Switzerland	22.625	1
17	Norway	21.475	1
18	Israel	21.332	1

Rank	Association	Coeff.	Teams
19	Croatia	21.041	1
20	Poland	17.500	1
21	Denmark	17.375	1
22	Sweden	17.241	1
23	Serbia and Montenegro	16.331	1
24	Slovakia	15.665	1
25	Bulgaria	15.165	1
26	Romania	13.916	1
27	Hungary	13.749	1
28	Slovenia	11.832	1
29	Cyprus	9.332	1
30	Finland	8.041	1
31	Latvia	7.165	1
32	Georgia	6.999	1
33	Moldova	5.165	1
34	Iceland	4.832	1
35	Belarus	4.083	1

Rank	Association	Coeff.	Teams
36	Lithuania	3.831	1
37	Republic of Ireland	3.331	1
38	Macedonia	2.997	1
39	Malta	2.498	1
40	Wales	1.832	1
41	Estonia	1.665	1
42	Bosnia and Herzegovina	1.333	1
43	Armenia	1.332	1
44	Northern Ireland	1.331	1
45	Albania	1.165	1
46	Faroe Islands	1.165	1
47	Azerbaijan	1.165	0
48	Liechtenstein	1.000	0
49	Luxembourg	0.832	1
50	Andorra	0.000	0
51	San Marino	0.000	0
52	Kazakhstan	0.000	1

=== Distribution ===
Since the title holders (Milan) also qualified for the Champions League Third qualifying round through their domestic league, one Third qualifying round spot was vacated. Due to this, as well as due to the suspension of Azerbaijan, the following changes to the default access list are made:

- The champions of association 16 (Switzerland) are promoted from the second qualifying round to the third qualifying round.
- The champions of associations 26, 27 and 28 (Romania, Hungary and Slovenia) are promoted from the first qualifying round to the second qualifying round.

	Teams entering in this round	Teams advancing from previous round
First qualifying round (20 teams)	20 champions from associations 29–52 (except Azerbaijan, Liechtenstein, Andorra and San Marino)	
Second qualifying round (28 teams)	12 champions from associations 17–28; 6 runners-up from associations 10–15	10 winners from the first qualifying round
Third qualifying round (32 teams)	7 champions from associations 10–16; 3 runners-up from associations 7–9; 5 third-place finishers from associations 1–6 (except Italy); 3 fourth-place finishers from associations 1–3	14 winners from the second qualifying round
Group stage (32 teams)	1 current Champions League title holder (Milan); 9 champions from associations 1–9; 6 runners-up from associations 1–6	16 winners from the third qualifying round
Knockout phase (16 teams)		8 group winners from the group stage; 8 group runners-up from the group stage

=== Teams ===
League positions of the previous season shown in parentheses (TH: Champions League title holders).

Group stage
(Spain) Real Madrid (1st)	(Italy) Milan (3rd)^{TH}	(Germany) VfB Stuttgart (2nd)	(Greece) Panathinaikos (2nd)
(Spain) Real Sociedad (2nd)	(England) Manchester United (1st)	(France) Lyon (1st)	(Netherlands) PSV Eindhoven (1st)
(Italy) Juventus (1st)	(England) Arsenal (2nd)	(France) Monaco (2nd)	(Turkey) Beşiktaş (1st)
(Italy) Internazionale (2nd)	(Germany) Bayern Munich (1st)	(Greece) Olympiacos (1st)	(Portugal) Porto (1st)
Third qualifying round
(Spain) Deportivo La Coruña (3rd)	(Germany) Borussia Dortmund (3rd)	(Portugal) Benfica (2nd)	(Ukraine) Dynamo Kyiv (1st)
(Spain) Celta Vigo (4th)	(France) Marseille (3rd)	(Russia) Lokomotiv Moscow (1st)	(Belgium) Club Brugge (1st)
(Italy) Lazio (4th)	(Greece) AEK Athens (3rd)	(Czech Republic) Sparta Prague (1st)	Austria Wien (1st)
(England) Newcastle United (3rd)	(Netherlands) Ajax (2nd)	(Scotland) Rangers (1st)	(Switzerland) Grasshopper (1st)
(England) Chelsea (4th)	(Turkey) Galatasaray (2nd)		
Second qualifying round
(Russia) CSKA Moscow (2nd)	(Austria) GAK (2nd)	(Denmark) Copenhagen (1st)	(Bulgaria) CSKA Sofia (1st)
(Czech Republic) Slavia Prague (2nd)	(Norway) Rosenborg (1st)	(Sweden) Djurgårdens IF (1st)	(Romania) Rapid București (1st)
(Scotland) Celtic (2nd)	(Israel) Maccabi Tel Aviv (1st)	(Serbia and Montenegro) Partizan (1st)	(Hungary) MTK Hungária (1st)
(Ukraine) Shakhtar Donetsk (2nd)	(Croatia) Dinamo Zagreb (1st)	(Slovakia) Žilina (1st)	(Slovenia) Maribor (1st)
(Belgium) Anderlecht (2nd)	(Poland) Wisła Kraków (1st)		
First qualifying round
(Cyprus) Omonia (1st)	(Iceland) KR (1st)	(Malta) Sliema Wanderers (1st)	(Northern Ireland) Glentoran (1st)
(Finland) HJK (1st)	(Belarus) BATE Borisov (1st)	(Wales) Barry Town (1st)	(Albania) Tirana (1st)
(Latvia) Skonto (1st)	(Lithuania) Kaunas (1st)	(Estonia) Flora (1st)	(Faroe Islands) HB (1st)
(Georgia (country)) Dinamo Tbilisi (1st)	(Republic of Ireland) Bohemians (1st)	(Bosnia and Herzegovina) Leotar (1st)	(Luxembourg) Grevenmacher (1st)
(Moldova) Sheriff Tiraspol (1st)	(North Macedonia) Vardar (1st)	(Armenia) Pyunik (1st)	(Kazakhstan) Irtysh (1st)

Notes

1. Azerbaijan (AZE): Clubs from Azerbaijan were not admitted to UEFA competitions as no domestic league took place in 2002–03 season and AFFA was suspended by UEFA as a result of ongoing conflict between the clubs and federation.

== Round and draw dates ==
The schedule of the competition was as follows (all draws were held at UEFA headquarters in Nyon, Switzerland, unless stated otherwise).

Phase	Round	Draw date	First leg	Second leg
Qualifying	First qualifying round	20 June 2003	16 July 2003	23 July 2003
Qualifying	Second qualifying round	20 June 2003	30 July 2003	6 August 2003
Qualifying	Third qualifying round	25 July 2003	12–13 August 2003	26–27 August 2003
Group stage	Matchday 1	28 August 2003 (Monaco)	16–17 September 2003	
Group stage	Matchday 2	28 August 2003 (Monaco)	30 September – 1 October 2003	
Group stage	Matchday 3	28 August 2003 (Monaco)	21–22 October 2003	
Group stage	Matchday 4	28 August 2003 (Monaco)	4–5 November 2003	
Group stage	Matchday 5	28 August 2003 (Monaco)	25–26 November 2003	
Group stage	Matchday 6	28 August 2003 (Monaco)	9–10 December 2003	
Knockout phase	Round of 16	12 December 2003	24–25 February 2004	9–10 March 2004
Knockout phase	Quarter-finals	12 March 2004	23–24 March 2004	6–7 April 2004
Knockout phase	Semi-finals	12 March 2004	20–21 April 2004	4–5 May 2004
Knockout phase	Final	12 March 2004	26 May 2004 at Arena AufSchalke, Gelsenkirchen	

== Qualifying rounds ==
=== First qualifying round ===
The first legs were played on 16 July, and the second legs were played on 23 July 2003.

Team 1	Agg.	Team 2	1st leg	2nd leg
Pyunik (Armenia)	2–1	(Iceland) KR	1–0	1–1
Sheriff Tiraspol (Moldova)	2–1	(Estonia) Flora	1–0	1–1
HB (Faroe Islands)	1–5	(Lithuania) Kaunas	0–1	1–4
BATE Borisov (Belarus)	1–3	(Republic of Ireland) Bohemians	1–0	0–3
Vardar (North Macedonia)	4–2	(Wales) Barry Town	3–0	1–2
Grevenmacher (Luxembourg)	0–2	(Bosnia and Herzegovina) Leotar	0–0	0–2
Glentoran (Northern Ireland)	0–1	(Finland) HJK	0–0	0–1
Sliema Wanderers (Malta)	3–3 (a)	(Latvia) Skonto	2–0	1–3
Omonia (Cyprus)	2–1	(Kazakhstan) Irtysh	0–0	2–1
Dinamo Tbilisi (Georgia (country))	3–3 (2–4 p)	(Albania) Tirana	3–0	0–3 (a.e.t.)

=== Second qualifying round ===
The first legs were played on 30 July, and the second legs were played on 6 August 2003.

Team 1	Agg.	Team 2	1st leg	2nd leg
MTK Hungária (Hungary)	3–2	(Finland) HJK	3–1	0–1
Pyunik (Armenia)	0–3	(Bulgaria) CSKA Sofia	0–2	0–1
Kaunas (Lithuania)	0–5	(Scotland) Celtic	0–4	0–1
Leotar (Bosnia and Herzegovina)	1–4	(Czech Republic) Slavia Prague	1–2	0–2
Sheriff Tiraspol (Moldova)	0–2	(Ukraine) Shakhtar Donetsk	0–0	0–2
Žilina (Slovakia)	2–1	(Israel) Maccabi Tel Aviv	1–0	1–1
Bohemians (Republic of Ireland)	0–5	(Norway) Rosenborg	0–1	0–4
Maribor (Slovenia)	2–3	(Croatia) Dinamo Zagreb	1–1	1–2
CSKA Moscow (Russia)	2–3	(North Macedonia) Vardar	1–2	1–1
Rapid București (Romania)	2–3	(Belgium) Anderlecht	0–0	2–3
Partizan (Serbia and Montenegro)	3–3 (a)	(Sweden) Djurgårdens IF	1–1	2–2
Wisła Kraków (Poland)	7–4	(Cyprus) Omonia	5–2	2–2
Copenhagen (Denmark)	10–1	(Malta) Sliema Wanderers	4–1	6–0
Tirana (Albania)	2–7	(Austria) GAK	1–5	1–2

=== Third qualifying round ===
The first legs were played on 12 and 13 August, and the second legs were played on 26 and 27 August 2003.

Team 1	Agg.	Team 2	1st leg	2nd leg
Vardar (North Macedonia)	4–5	(Czech Republic) Sparta Prague	2–3	2–2
MTK Hungária (Hungary)	0–5	(Scotland) Celtic	0–4	0–1
Rangers (Scotland)	3–2	(Denmark) Copenhagen	1–1	2–1
Austria Wien	0–1	(France) Marseille	0–1	0–0
Club Brugge (Belgium)	3–3 (4–2 p)	(Germany) Borussia Dortmund	2–1	1–2 (a.e.t.)
Shakhtar Donetsk (Ukraine)	2–3	(Russia) Lokomotiv Moscow	1–0	1–3
Lazio (Italy)	4–1	(Portugal) Benfica	3–1	1–0
Dynamo Kyiv (Ukraine)	5–1	(Croatia) Dinamo Zagreb	3–1	2–0
Rosenborg (Norway)	0–1	(Spain) Deportivo La Coruña	0–0	0–1
Grasshopper (Switzerland)	2–3	(Greece) AEK Athens	1–0	1–3
Žilina (Slovakia)	0–5	(England) Chelsea	0–2	0–3
Celta Vigo (Spain)	3–2	(Czech Republic) Slavia Prague	3–0	0–2
Partizan (Serbia and Montenegro)	1–1 (4–3 p)	(England) Newcastle United	0–1	1–0 (a.e.t.)
Galatasaray (Turkey)	6–0	(Bulgaria) CSKA Sofia	3–0	3–0
Anderlecht (Belgium)	4–1	(Poland) Wisła Kraków	3–1	1–0
GAK (Austria)	2–3	(Netherlands) Ajax	1–1	1–2 (a.e.t.)

== Group stage ==
Location of teams of the 2003–04 UEFA Champions League group stage.
Brown: Group A; Red: Group B; Orange: Group C; Yellow: Group D;
Green: Group E; Blue: Group F; Purple: Group G; Pink: Group H.

Title holders, 16 winners from the third qualifying round, 9 champions from countries ranked 1–10, and six second-placed teams from countries ranked 1–6 were drawn into eight groups of four teams each. The top two teams in each group advanced to the Champions League play-offs, while the third-placed teams advanced to the Third Round of the UEFA Cup.

Tiebreakers, if necessary, were applied in the following order:

1. Points earned in head-to-head matches between the tied teams.
2. Total goals scored in head-to-head matches between the tied teams.
3. Away goals scored in head-to-head matches between the tied teams.
4. Cumulative goal difference in all group matches.
5. Total goals scored in all group matches.
6. Higher UEFA coefficient going into the competition.

Celta Vigo, Partizan, Real Sociedad and VfB Stuttgart made their debut appearances in the group stage. This season became the first in the history of the Champions League in which three Greek clubs played in the group stage

=== Group A ===
Pos	Team	Pld	W	D	L	GF	GA	GD	Pts	Qualification	LYO	BAY	CEL	AND
1	(France) Lyon	6	3	1	2	7	7	0	10	Advance to knockout stage	—	1–1	3–2	1–0
2	(Germany) Bayern Munich	6	2	3	1	6	5	+1	9	Advance to knockout stage	1–2	—	2–1	1–0
3	(Scotland) Celtic	6	2	1	3	8	7	+1	7	Transfer to UEFA Cup	2–0	0–0	—	3–1
4	(Belgium) Anderlecht	6	2	1	3	4	6	−2	7		1–0	1–1	1–0	—

Source: RSSSF

=== Group B ===
Pos	Team	Pld	W	D	L	GF	GA	GD	Pts	Qualification	ARS	LMO	INT	DKV
1	(England) Arsenal	6	3	1	2	9	6	+3	10	Advance to knockout stage	—	2–0	0–3	1–0
2	(Russia) Lokomotiv Moscow	6	2	2	2	7	7	0	8	Advance to knockout stage	0–0	—	3–0	3–2
3	(Italy) Internazionale	6	2	2	2	8	11	−3	8	Transfer to UEFA Cup	1–5	1–1	—	2–1
4	(Ukraine) Dynamo Kyiv	6	2	1	3	8	8	0	7		2–1	2–0	1–1	—

=== Group C ===
Pos	Team	Pld	W	D	L	GF	GA	GD	Pts	Qualification	MON	DEP	PSV	AEK
1	(France) Monaco	6	3	2	1	15	6	+9	11	Advance to knockout stage	—	8–3	1–1	4–0
2	(Spain) Deportivo La Coruña	6	3	1	2	12	12	0	10	Advance to knockout stage	1–0	—	2–0	3–0
3	(Netherlands) PSV Eindhoven	6	3	1	2	8	7	+1	10	Transfer to UEFA Cup	1–2	3–2	—	2–0
4	(Greece) AEK Athens	6	0	2	4	1	11	−10	2		0–0	1–1	0–1	—

Source: RSSSF

=== Group D ===
Pos	Team	Pld	W	D	L	GF	GA	GD	Pts	Qualification	JUV	RSO	GAL	OLY
1	(Italy) Juventus	6	4	1	1	15	6	+9	13	Advance to knockout stage	—	4–2	2–1	7–0
2	(Spain) Real Sociedad	6	2	3	1	8	8	0	9	Advance to knockout stage	0–0	—	1–1	1–0
3	(Turkey) Galatasaray	6	2	1	3	6	8	−2	7	Transfer to UEFA Cup	2–0	1–2	—	1–0
4	(Greece) Olympiacos	6	1	1	4	6	13	−7	4		1–2	2–2	3–0	—

Source: RSSSF

=== Group E ===
Pos	Team	Pld	W	D	L	GF	GA	GD	Pts	Qualification	MUN	STU	PAN	RAN
1	(England) Manchester United	6	5	0	1	13	2	+11	15	Advance to knockout stage	—	2–0	5–0	3–0
2	(Germany) VfB Stuttgart	6	4	0	2	9	6	+3	12	Advance to knockout stage	2–1	—	2–0	1–0
3	(Greece) Panathinaikos	6	1	1	4	5	13	−8	4	Transfer to UEFA Cup	0–1	1–3	—	1–1
4	(Scotland) Rangers	6	1	1	4	4	10	−6	4		0–1	2–1	1–3	—

Source: RSSSF

=== Group F ===
Pos	Team	Pld	W	D	L	GF	GA	GD	Pts	Qualification	RMA	POR	MAR	PTZ
1	(Spain) Real Madrid	6	4	2	0	11	5	+6	14	Advance to knockout stage	—	1–1	4–2	1–0
2	(Portugal) Porto	6	3	2	1	9	8	+1	11	Advance to knockout stage	1–3	—	1–0	2–1
3	(France) Marseille	6	1	1	4	9	11	−2	4	Transfer to UEFA Cup	1–2	2–3	—	3–0
4	(Serbia and Montenegro) Partizan	6	0	3	3	3	8	−5	3		0–0	1–1	1–1	—

Source: RSSSF

=== Group G ===
Pos	Team	Pld	W	D	L	GF	GA	GD	Pts	Qualification	CHE	SPP	BES	LAZ
1	(England) Chelsea	6	4	1	1	9	3	+6	13	Advance to knockout stage	—	0–0	0–2	2–1
2	(Czech Republic) Sparta Prague	6	2	2	2	5	5	0	8	Advance to knockout stage	0–1	—	2–1	1–0
3	(Turkey) Beşiktaş	6	2	1	3	5	7	−2	7	Transfer to UEFA Cup	0–2	1–0	—	0–2
4	(Italy) Lazio	6	1	2	3	6	10	−4	5		0–4	2–2	1–1	—

Source: RSSSF

=== Group H ===
Pos	Team	Pld	W	D	L	GF	GA	GD	Pts	Qualification	MIL	CLT	BRU	AJX
1	(Italy) Milan	6	3	1	2	4	3	+1	10	Advance to knockout stage	—	1–2	0–1	1–0
2	(Spain) Celta Vigo	6	2	3	1	7	6	+1	9	Advance to knockout stage	0–0	—	1–1	3–2
3	(Belgium) Club Brugge	6	2	2	2	5	6	−1	8	Transfer to UEFA Cup	0–1	1–1	—	2–1
4	(Netherlands) Ajax	6	2	0	4	6	7	−1	6		0–1	1–0	2–0	—

Source: RSSSF

== Knockout phase ==
=== Bracket ===
Round of 16
(Germany) Bayern Munich	1	0	1
(Spain) Real Madrid	1	1	2
(Russia) Lokomotiv Moscow	2	0	2
(France) Monaco (a)	1	1	2
(Germany) VfB Stuttgart	0	0	0
(England) Chelsea	1	0	1
(Spain) Celta Vigo	2	0	2
(England) Arsenal	3	2	5
(Portugal) Porto	2	1	3
(England) Manchester United	1	1	2
(Spain) Real Sociedad	0	0	0
(France) Lyon	1	1	2
(Czech Republic) Sparta Prague	0	1	1
(Italy) Milan	0	4	4
(Spain) Deportivo La Coruña	1	1	2
(Italy) Juventus	0	0	0

Quarter-finals
(Spain) Real Madrid	4	1	5
(France) Monaco (a)	2	3	5
(England) Chelsea	1	2	3
(England) Arsenal	1	1	2
(Portugal) Porto	2	2	4
(France) Lyon	0	2	2
(Italy) Milan	4	0	4
(Spain) Deportivo La Coruña	1	4	5

Semi-finals
(France) Monaco	3	2	5
(England) Chelsea	1	2	3
(Portugal) Porto	0	1	1
(Spain) Deportivo La Coruña	0	0	0

Final
26 May – Gelsenkirchen
(France) Monaco	0
(Portugal) Porto	3

=== Round of 16 ===
Team 1	Agg.	Team 2	1st leg	2nd leg
Bayern Munich (Germany)	1–2	(Spain) Real Madrid	1–1	0–1
Celta Vigo (Spain)	2–5	(England) Arsenal	2–3	0–2
Deportivo La Coruña (Spain)	2–0	(Italy) Juventus	1–0	1–0
Lokomotiv Moscow (Russia)	2–2 (a)	(France) Monaco	2–1	0–1
Porto (Portugal)	3–2	(England) Manchester United	2–1	1–1
Real Sociedad (Spain)	0–2	(France) Lyon	0–1	0–1
Sparta Prague (Czech Republic)	1–4	(Italy) Milan	0–0	1–4
VfB Stuttgart (Germany)	0–1	(England) Chelsea	0–1	0–0

=== Quarter-finals ===
Team 1	Agg.	Team 2	1st leg	2nd leg
Chelsea (England)	3–2	(England) Arsenal	1–1	2–1
Milan (Italy)	4–5	(Spain) Deportivo La Coruña	4–1	0–4
Porto (Portugal)	4–2	(France) Lyon	2–0	2–2
Real Madrid (Spain)	5–5 (a)	(France) Monaco	4–2	1–3

=== Semi-finals ===
Team 1	Agg.	Team 2	1st leg	2nd leg
Monaco (France)	5–3	(England) Chelsea	3–1	2–2
Porto (Portugal)	1–0	(Spain) Deportivo La Coruña	0–0	1–0

=== Final ===
The final was played on 26 May 2004 at the Arena AufSchalke in Gelsenkirchen, Germany.

26 May 2004
20:45 UTC+2

Monaco (France)	0–3	(Portugal) Porto
	Report	Carlos Alberto 39'; Deco 71'; Alenichev 75'

Arena AufSchalke, Gelsenkirchen
Attendance: 53,053
Referee: Kim Milton Nielsen (Denmark)

== Statistics ==
Statistics exclude qualifying rounds.

=== Top goalscorers ===
Rank	Player	Team	Goals	Minutes played
1	(Spain) Fernando Morientes	(France) Monaco	9	1026
2	(Croatia) Dado Pršo	(France) Monaco	7	512
3	(Netherlands) Roy Makaay	(Germany) Bayern Munich	6	720
3	(Uruguay) Walter Pandiani	(Spain) Deportivo La Coruña	6	773
5	(Ivory Coast) Didier Drogba	(France) Marseille	5	515
5	(Turkey) Hakan Şükür	(Turkey) Galatasaray	5	539
5	(Brazil) Juninho	(France) Lyon	5	799
5	(France) Thierry Henry	(England) Arsenal	5	888
9	(France) David Trezeguet	(Italy) Juventus	4	359
9	(Belgium) Wesley Sonck	(Netherlands) Ajax	4	401
9	(Netherlands) Ruud van Nistelrooy	(England) Manchester United	4	596
9	(Spain) Albert Luque	(Spain) Deportivo La Coruña	4	640
9	(South Africa) Benni McCarthy	(Portugal) Porto	4	643
9	(Brazil) Ronaldo	(Spain) Real Madrid	4	729
9	(Ukraine) Andriy Shevchenko	(Italy) Milan	4	765
9	(Brazil) Kaká	(Italy) Milan	4	780
9	(France) Ludovic Giuly	(France) Monaco	4	783
9	(France) Robert Pires	(England) Arsenal	4	852
9	(England) Frank Lampard	(England) Chelsea	4	1035

=== Squad of the season ===
UEFA's Technical Study Group selected the following 20 players for the 2003–04 UEFA Champions League Team of the Tournament.

Pos.	Player	Team
GK	(Italy) Gianluigi Buffon	(Italy) Juventus
GK	(Portugal) Vítor Baía	(Portugal) Porto
DF	(England) Sol Campbell	(England) Arsenal
DF	(Brazil) Roberto Carlos	(Spain) Real Madrid
DF	(England) John Terry	(England) Chelsea
DF	(France) Patrice Evra	(France) Monaco
DF	(Portugal) Jorge Andrade	(Spain) Deportivo La Coruña
DF	(Portugal) Ricardo Carvalho	(Portugal) Porto
MF	(Brazil) Kaká	(Italy) AC Milan
MF	(France) Patrick Vieira	(England) Arsenal
MF	(France) Zinedine Zidane	(Spain) Real Madrid
MF	(Spain) Juan Carlos Valerón	(Spain) Deportivo La Coruña
MF	(Portugal) Deco	(Portugal) Porto
MF	(England) Frank Lampard	(England) Chelsea
MF	(Spain) Fernando Morientes	(France) Monaco
FW	(Ukraine) Andriy Shevchenko	(Italy) AC Milan
FW	(Uruguay) Walter Pandiani	(Spain) Deportivo La Coruña
FW	(France) Thierry Henry	(England) Arsenal
FW	(Netherlands) Roy Makaay	(Germany) Bayern Munich
FW	(Netherlands) Ruud van Nistelrooy	(England) Manchester United

== See also ==
- 2003–04 UEFA Cup
- 2003 UEFA Intertoto Cup
- 2003–04 UEFA Women's Cup
