= 2005–06 FK Partizan season =

Partizan
2005–06 season
- President: Ivan Ćurković
- Head coach: Vladimir Vermezović (until October 2005); Jürgen Röber (from October 2005)
- Serbia and Montenegro SuperLiga: Runners-up
- Serbia and Montenegro Cup: Round of 16
- UEFA Champions League: Third qualifying round
- UEFA Cup: First round
- Top goalscorer: League: Srđan Radonjić (20); All: Srđan Radonjić (23)

The 2005–06 season was the 60th season in FK Partizan's existence. This article shows player statistics and all matches (official and friendly) that the club played during the 2005–06 season.

== Players ==
=== Squad information ===
Note: Flags indicate national team as defined under FIFA eligibility rules; some limited exceptions apply. Players may hold more than one non-FIFA nationality.

No.	Pos.	Nation	Player
2	DF	SCG	Milivoje Ćirković
3	DF	SCG	Niša Saveljić
4	DF	SCG	Zoran Mirković
6	DF	SCG	Bojan Šljivančanin
7	MF	SCG	Nenad Brnović
8	FW	CMR	Pierre Boya
9	FW	SCG	Srđan Radonjić
10	MF	SCG	Stefan Babović
11	MF	SCG	Miroslav Radović
13	DF	SCG	Marko Lomić
14	DF	SCG	Nenad Đorđević
17	FW	SCG	Danko Lazović (on loan from Feyenoord)
21	MF	SCG	Ivan Tomić
24	DF	SCG	Nemanja Rnić
25	GK	SCG	Ivica Kralj
26	DF	SCG	Perica Stančeski
28	MF	SCG	Albert Nađ (captain)

No.	Pos.	Nation	Player
29	MF	SCG	Nenad Marinković
30	GK	CYP	Nikolas Asprogenis
31	MF	SCG	Milan Smiljanić
32	DF	SCG	Milan Perendija
33	DF	SCG	Nikola Dragićević
34	FW	BIH	Admir Aganović
35	FW	SCG	Borko Veselinović
37	DF	SCG	Tomislav Pajović
38	FW	SCG	Stevan Jovetić
39	GK	SCG	Vladimir Lukić
41	MF	SCG	Zoran Vujović
42	MF	SCG	Miloš Bosančić
43	MF	SCG	Bojan Čukić
44	MF	SCG	Miralem Sulejmani
77	GK	SCG	Nemanja Jovšić
88	MF	SCG	Zvonimir Vukić (on loan from Shakhtar Donetsk)

=== Squad statistics ===
No.	Pos.	Name	League		Cup		Europe		Total	
No.	Pos.	Name	Apps	Goals	Apps	Goals	Apps	Goals	Apps	Goals
2	DF	(Serbia and Montenegro) Milivoje Ćirković	9	0	0	0	2	0	11	0
3	DF	(Serbia and Montenegro) Niša Saveljić	19	2	0	0	0	0	19	2
4	DF	(Serbia and Montenegro) Zoran Mirković	13	0	0	0	6	0	19	0
6	DF	(Serbia and Montenegro) Bojan Šljivančanin	1	1	0	0	0	0	1	1
7	MF	(Serbia and Montenegro) Nenad Brnović	21	0	1	0	6	0	28	0
8	FW	(Cameroon) Pierre Boya	27	3	1	0	5	0	33	3
9	FW	(Serbia and Montenegro) Srđan Radonjić	28	20	2	0	3	3	33	23
10	MF	(Serbia and Montenegro) Stefan Babović	23	3	2	0	2	0	27	3
11	MF	(Serbia and Montenegro) Miroslav Radović	12	2	2	1	5	0	19	3
13	DF	(Serbia and Montenegro) Marko Lomić	29	1	2	0	5	0	36	1
14	DF	(Serbia and Montenegro) Nenad Đorđević	20	1	2	0	4	0	26	1
17	FW	(Serbia and Montenegro) Danko Lazović	11	5	0	0	0	0	11	5
21	MF	(Serbia and Montenegro) Ivan Tomić	16	3	0	0	3	0	19	3
24	DF	(Serbia and Montenegro) Nemanja Rnić	10	0	0	0	1	0	11	0
25	GK	(Serbia and Montenegro) Ivica Kralj	21	0	0	0	5	0	26	0
26	DF	(Serbia and Montenegro) Perica Stančeski	1	0	0	0	0	0	1	0
28	MF	(Serbia and Montenegro) Albert Nađ	28	2	0	0	6	0	34	2
29	MF	(Serbia and Montenegro) Nenad Marinković	6	0	0	0	0	0	6	0
30	GK	(Cyprus) Nikolas Asprogenis	5	0	0	0	0	0	5	0
31	MF	(Serbia and Montenegro) Milan Smiljanić	15	1	1	0	0	0	16	1
32	DF	(Serbia and Montenegro) Milan Perendija	0	0	0	0	0	0	0	0
33	DF	(Serbia and Montenegro) Nikola Dragićević	0	0	0	0	0	0	0	0
34	FW	(Bosnia and Herzegovina) Admir Aganović	0	0	0	0	0	0	0	0
35	FW	(Serbia and Montenegro) Borko Veselinović	12	0	1	0	0	0	13	0
37	DF	(Serbia and Montenegro) Tomislav Pajović	0	0	0	0	0	0	0	0
38	FW	(Serbia and Montenegro) Stevan Jovetić	2	0	0	0	0	0	2	0
39	GK	(Serbia and Montenegro) Vladimir Lukić	0	0	0	0	0	0	0	0
41	MF	(Serbia and Montenegro) Zoran Vujović	0	0	0	0	0	0	0	0
42	MF	(Serbia and Montenegro) Miloš Bosančić	0	0	0	0	0	0	0	0
43	MF	(Serbia and Montenegro) Bojan Čukić	0	0	0	0	0	0	0	0
44	MF	(Serbia and Montenegro) Miralem Sulejmani	1	0	0	0	0	0	1	0
77	GK	(Serbia and Montenegro) Nemanja Jovšić	2	0	0	0	0	0	2	0
88	MF	(Serbia and Montenegro) Zvonimir Vukić	2	0	0	0	0	0	2	0
Players sold or loaned out during the season
1	MF	(Serbia and Montenegro) Simon Vukčević	13	3	2	0	6	1	21	4
5	DF	(Bosnia and Herzegovina) Branimir Bajić	12	1	1	0	6	0	19	1
6	DF	(Serbia and Montenegro) Dragoljub Jeremić	0	0	1	0	0	0	1	0
15	FW	(Nigeria) Obiora Odita	13	1	2	1	6	2	21	4
16	DF	(Nigeria) Ifeanyi Emeghara	12	0	1	0	4	0	17	0
18	MF	(Serbia and Montenegro) Branimir Petrović	0	0	1	0	0	0	1	0
19	MF	(Serbia and Montenegro) Vladimir Vukajlović	0	0	0	0	1	0	1	0
20	DF	(Serbia and Montenegro) Milovan Milović	3	0	2	0	1	0	6	0
27	GK	(Serbia and Montenegro) Đorđe Pantić	3	0	2	0	1	0	6	0
34	FW	(Serbia and Montenegro) Nikola Grubješić	6	0	1	0	3	0	10	0
36	MF	(Serbia and Montenegro) Nebojša Marinković	5	3	1	1	1	0	7	4
38	MF	(Serbia and Montenegro) Predrag Pavlović	0	0	0	0	0	0	0	0

== Transfers ==
=== In ===
Date	Pos.	Name	From	Fee	Ref.
June 2005	DF	(Serbia and Montenegro) Marko Lomić	(Serbia and Montenegro) Železnik	Undisclosed	
July 2005	MF	(Serbia and Montenegro) Vladimir Vukajlović	(Serbia and Montenegro) Borac Čačak	Undisclosed	
July 2005	DF	(Serbia and Montenegro) Niša Saveljić	(France) Istres	Undisclosed	
January 2006	DF	(Serbia and Montenegro) Bojan Šljivančanin	(Serbia and Montenegro) Jedinstvo Bijelo Polje	Undisclosed	

=== Out ===
Date	Pos.	Name	To	Fee	Ref.
June 2005	MF	(Serbia and Montenegro) Dragan Ćirić	Unattached	Released	
July 2005	MF	(Serbia and Montenegro) Saša Ilić	(Turkey) Galatasaray	Undisclosed	
December 2005	MF	(Serbia and Montenegro) Simon Vukčević	(Russia) Saturn Ramenskoye	Undisclosed	
January 2006	DF	(Nigeria) Ifeanyi Emeghara	(Romania) Politehnica Timișoara	Undisclosed	
January 2006	FW	(Serbia and Montenegro) Bojan Brnović	(Hungary) Debrecen	Undisclosed	

=== Loan in ===
Date from	Date to	Pos.	Name	From	Ref.
January 2006	June 2006	FW	(Serbia and Montenegro) Danko Lazović	(Netherlands) Feyenoord	
January 2006	June 2006	MF	(Serbia and Montenegro) Zvonimir Vukić	(Ukraine) Shakhtar Donetsk	

=== Loan out ===
Date from	Date to	Pos.	Name	To	Ref.
June 2005	December 2005	MF	(Serbia and Montenegro) Branimir Petrović	(China) Shandong Luneng	
July 2005	December 2005	MF	(Serbia and Montenegro) Marko Anđelković	(Serbia and Montenegro) Obilić	
July 2005	December 2005	DF	(Serbia and Montenegro) Ivan Babić	(Serbia and Montenegro) Obilić	
July 2005	June 2006	DF	(Serbia and Montenegro) Srđa Knežević	(Serbia and Montenegro) Obilić	
July 2005	June 2006	DF	(Serbia and Montenegro) Marko Marović	(Serbia and Montenegro) Obilić	
July 2005	June 2006	MF	(Serbia and Montenegro) Ivan Stanković	(Serbia and Montenegro) Obilić	
July 2005	June 2006	MF	(Serbia and Montenegro) Jovan Stefanović	(Serbia and Montenegro) Obilić	
July 2005	June 2006	MF	(Bosnia and Herzegovina) Milan Srećo	(Bosnia and Herzegovina) Slavija Sarajevo	
July 2005	June 2006	MF	(North Macedonia) Ostoja Stjepanović	(Bosnia and Herzegovina) Slavija Sarajevo	
July 2005	December 2005	GK	(Serbia and Montenegro) Nemanja Jovšić	(Serbia and Montenegro) Jedinstvo Bijelo Polje	
July 2005	December 2005	FW	(Serbia and Montenegro) Bojan Brnović	(Hungary) Debrecen	
January 2006	June 2006	DF	(Serbia and Montenegro) Milovan Milović	(Serbia and Montenegro) Javor Ivanjica	
January 2006	June 2006	FW	(Nigeria) Obiora Odita	(Serbia and Montenegro) Javor Ivanjica	
January 2006	June 2006	MF	(Serbia and Montenegro) Marko Anđelković	(Serbia and Montenegro) Napredak	
January 2006	June 2006	MF	(Serbia and Montenegro) Predrag Pavlović	(Serbia and Montenegro) Napredak	
January 2006	June 2006	GK	(Serbia and Montenegro) Đorđe Pantić	(Serbia and Montenegro) Obilić	
January 2006	June 2006	MF	(Nigeria) Peter Omoduemuke	(Serbia and Montenegro) Obilić	
January 2006	June 2006	DF	(Serbia and Montenegro) Dragoljub Jeremić	(North Macedonia) Rabotnički	
January 2006	June 2006	DF	(Serbia and Montenegro) Ivan Babić	(Serbia and Montenegro) Rad	
January 2006	June 2006	MF	(Serbia and Montenegro) Vladimir Vukajlović	(Serbia and Montenegro) Rad	
January 2006	June 2006	FW	(Serbia and Montenegro) Nikola Grubješić	(Serbia and Montenegro) Voždovac	
January 2006	June 2006	MF	(Serbia and Montenegro) Nebojša Marinković	(Serbia and Montenegro) Voždovac	
January 2006	June 2006	MF	(Serbia and Montenegro) Branimir Petrović	(Serbia and Montenegro) Zeta	
February 2006	June 2006	DF	(Bosnia and Herzegovina) Branimir Bajić	(United Arab Emirates) Al Wahda	

== Competitions ==
=== Overview ===
Competition	Record							
Competition	P	W	D	L	GF	GA	GD	Win %
SCG SuperLiga	30	22	5	3	53	17	+36	73.33
SCG Cup	2	1	1	0	3	1	+2	50.00
UEFA Champions league/Uefa Cup	6	3	2	1	6	5	+1	50.00
Total	38	26	8	4	62	23	+39	68.42

=== Serbia and Montenegro SuperLiga ===
==== League table ====
Pos	Team	Pld	W	D	L	GF	GA	GD	Pts	Qualification or relegation
1	Red Star Belgrade (C)	30	25	3	2	73	23	+50	78	Qualification for Champions League second qualifying round
2	Partizan	30	22	5	3	53	17	+36	71	Qualification for UEFA Cup second qualifying round (Note: OFK Beograd qualified for 2006–07 UEFA Cup as runner-up of 2005–06 Serbia and Montenegro Cup.)
3	Voždovac	30	15	6	9	52	38	+14	51	Ineligible for 2006–07 European competitions
4	Hajduk Kula	30	13	11	6	41	26	+15	50	Qualification for UEFA Cup second qualifying round
5	Zeta	30	14	5	11	42	36	+6	47	Qualification for Intertoto Cup second round and Montenegrin First League

Source: RSSSF.org
Rules for classification: 1) points; 2) goal difference; 3) number of goals scored.
(C) Champions
Notes:

6 August 2005 1	Partizan	2–0	Jedinstvo Bijelo Polje	Belgrade
	Tomić 21'; Radović 56'			Stadium: Partizan Stadium; Attendance: 5,000; Referee: Darko Stojanović

14 August 2005 2	Partizan	2–1	Smederevo	Belgrade
	Vukčević 31'; Tomić 76' (pen.)		Kekezović 38'	Stadium: Partizan Stadium; Attendance: 1,500; Referee: Igor Pejović

19 August 2005 3	Javor	0–1	Partizan	Ivanjica
			Tomić 51' (pen.)	Stadium: Ivanjica Stadium; Attendance: 4,000; Referee: Dejan Andrejić

28 August 2005 4	Partizan	0–1	OFK Beograd	Belgrade
			Stošić 8'	Stadium: Partizan Stadium; Attendance: 15,000; Referee: Mihajlo Jeknić

10 September 2005 5	Zemun	0–2	Partizan	Belgrade
			Vukčević 25' (pen.); Radonjić 74'	Stadium: Zemun Stadium; Attendance: 6,000; Referee: Nebojša Rabrenović

18 September 2005 6	Partizan	3–0	Vojvodina	Belgrade
	Bajić 36'; Marinković 86', 90'			Stadium: Partizan Stadium; Attendance: 1,500; Referee: Igor Janković

24 September 2005 7	Zeta	1–3	Partizan	Golubovci
	Milić 37'		Radonjić 59'; Vukčević 65'; Odita 73'	Stadium: Stadion Trešnjica; Attendance: 2,500

2 October 2005 8	Partizan	0–0	Hajduk Kula	Belgrade
				Stadium: Partizan Stadium; Attendance: 1,000

15 October 2005 9	Crvena zvezda	2–0	Partizan	Belgrade
	Luković 72' (pen.); Perović 90+1'			Stadium: Marakana; Attendance: 20,000; Referee: Mihajlo Jeknić

22 October 2005 10	Partizan	2–3	Voždovac	Belgrade
	Radonjić 10'; Babović 42'		Jovanović 49'; Anđelković 70'; Kalajdžić 84'	Stadium: Partizan Stadium; Attendance: 800; Referee: Milenko Vukadinović

29 October 2005 11	Borac Čačak	0–2	Partizan	Čačak
			Nađ 19'; Radonjić 29' (pen.)	Stadium: Čačak Stadium; Attendance: 3,500; Referee: Igor Janković

5 November 2005 12	Partizan	2–0	Budućnost Banatski Dvor	Belgrade
	Radonjić 11' (pen.); Marinković 85'			Stadium: Partizan Stadium; Attendance: 1,000

20 November 2005 13	Rad	1–2	Partizan	Belgrade
	Novaković 35'		Radonjić 27' (pen.), 64'	Stadium: King Peter I Stadium; Attendance: 2,000; Referee: Milan Karadžić

26 November 2005 14	Partizan	4–2	Obilić	Belgrade
	Radonjić 10', 86'; Đorđević 13'; Nađ 37'		Zajić 63'; Petrović 90'	Stadium: Partizan Stadium; Attendance: 1,000; Referee: Saša Bogićević

3 December 2005 15	Budućnost Podgorica	0–1	Partizan	Podgorica
			Smiljanić 84'	Stadium: Podgorica City Stadium; Attendance: 8,000; Referee: Igor Janković

7 December 2005 16	Jedinstvo Bijelo Polje	2–3	Partizan	Bijelo Polje
	Trifunović 48', 69'		Lomić 64'; Radonjić 67'; Saveljić 83'	Stadium: Gradski stadion Attendance: 2,000; Referee: Dejan Andrejić

15 December 2005 17	Smederevo	0–1	Partizan	Smederevo
			Saveljić 55'	Stadium: Smederevo Stadium; Referee: Aleksandar Marković

18 February 2006 18	Partizan	6–0	Javor	Belgrade
	Lazović 22', 31'; Radonjić 34' (pen.), 37' (pen.), 56'; Babović 65'			Stadium: Partizan Stadium; Attendance: 6,000; Referee: Jovanović

25 February 2006 19	OFK Beograd	0–1	Partizan	Belgrade
			Bajalica 90+3' (o.g.)	Stadium: Omladinski Stadium; Attendance: 3,500; Referee: Dragomir Tanović

5 March 2006 20	Partizan	0–0	Zemun	Belgrade
				Stadium: Partizan Stadium; Attendance: 11,500; Referee: Dragan Krstić

11 March 2006 21	Vojvodina	2–3	Partizan	Novi Sad
	Nastić 45'; Vukelja 87'		Radonjić 8', 55' (pen.); Šljivančanin 19'	Stadium: Stadion Karađorđe; Attendance: 6,000; Referee: Aleksandar Marković

21 March 2006 22	Partizan	1–0	Zeta	Belgrade
	Babović 46'			Stadium: Partizan Stadium; Attendance: 6,000

25 March 2006 23	Hajduk Kula	0–0	Partizan	Kula
				Stadium: Stadion Hajduk; Attendance: 3,000; Referee: Ranko Spasojević

1 April 2006 24	Partizan	0–0	Crvena zvezda	Belgrade
				Stadium: Partizan Stadium; Attendance: 21,395; Referee: Aleksandar Marković

8 April 2006 25	Voždovac	1–3	Partizan	Belgrade
	Stepanović 72'		Boya 6', 24'; Radonjić 32'	Stadium: Stadion Voždovca; Attendance: 1,000; Referee: Milan Karadžić

15 April 2006 26	Partizan	1–0	Borac Čačak	Belgrade
	Lazović 44'			Stadium: Partizan Stadium; Attendance: 4,270; Referee: Ninoslav Spasić

22 April 2006 27	Budućnost Banatski Dvor	1–1	Partizan	Banatski Dvor
	Stojaković 56'		Lazović 88'	Stadium: Stadion Mirko Vučurević; Attendance: 1,000; Referee: Darko Stojanović

29 April 2006 28	Partizan	2–0	Rad	Belgrade
	Radović 34'; Lazović 90'			Stadium: Partizan Stadium; Attendance: 3,217; Referee: Božidar Ćorsović

3 May 2006 29	Obilić	0–2	Partizan	Belgrade
			Radonjić 40', 63'

6 May 2006 30	Partizan	3–0	Budućnost Podgorica	Belgrade
	Boya; Radonjić			Stadium: Partizan Stadium

=== Serbia and Montenegro Cup ===
21 September 2005 Round of 32	Partizan	2–0	Javor	Belgrade
	Marinković 51'; Radović 80'			Stadium: Partizan Stadium

27 October 2005 Round of 16	Partizan	1–1 (4–5 p)	Timok	Belgrade
	Odita 40'		Joković 90'	Stadium: Partizan Stadium

=== UEFA Champions League ===
==== Second qualifying round ====
27 July 2005 QR2	Partizan (Serbia and Montenegro)	1–0	(Moldova) Sheriff Tiraspol	Belgrade, Serbia and Montenegro
19:30	Odita 63'	Report		Stadium: Stadion FK Partizan; Attendance: 17,000; Referee: Krzysztof Slupik (Poland)

3 August 2005 QR2	Sheriff Tiraspol (Moldova)	0–1 (0 – 2 agg.)	(Serbia and Montenegro) Partizan	Tiraspol, Moldavia
19:30		Report	Odita 74'	Stadium: Sheriff Stadium; Attendance: 13,000; Referee: Pascal Garibian (France)

==== Third qualifying round ====
10 August 2005 QR3	Artmedia (Slovakia)	0–0	(Serbia and Montenegro) Partizan	Bratislava, Slovakia
20:00		Report		Stadium: Tehelné pole Attendance: 16,127; Referee: Peter Fröjdfeldt (Sweden)

23 August 2005 QR3	Partizan (Serbia and Montenegro)	0–0 (a.e.t.) (0 – 0 agg.) (3–4 p)	(Slovakia) Artmedia	Belgrade, Serbia and Montenegro
20:00		Report		Stadium: Stadion FK Partizan; Attendance: 30,000; Referee: Steve Bennett (England)
	Penalties
	Nađ (penalty scored); Mirković (penalty missed); Bajić (penalty scored); Vukčević (penalty scored); Boya (penalty missed); Brnović (penalty missed)		(penalty scored) Fodrek; (penalty missed) Kozák; (penalty scored) Halenár; (penalty missed) Fabio Gomes; (penalty scored) Debnár; (penalty scored) Ďurica

=== UEFA Cup ===
==== First round ====
15 September 2005 First round	Maccabi Petah Tikva (Israel)	0–2	(Serbia and Montenegro) Partizan	Ramat Gan, Israel
19:30		Report	Vukčević 33'; Radonjić 46'	Stadium: Ramat Gan Stadium; Attendance: 3,700; Referee: Costas Kapitanis (Cyprus)

29 September 2005 First round	Partizan (Serbia and Montenegro)	2–5 (4 – 5 agg.)	(Israel) Maccabi Petah Tikva	Belgrade, Serbia and Montenegro
20:00	Radonjić 13' (pen.), 41'	Report	Mashiah 4' (pen.); Golan 21', 44', 48'; Edri 88'	Stadium: Stadion FK Partizan; Attendance: 12,000; Referee: Carlos Megia Davila (Spain)

== See also ==
- List of FK Partizan seasons
