= 2006–07 FK Partizan season =

Partizan
2006–07 season
- President: Nenad Popović
- Head coach: Miodrag Ješić (until January 2007); Miroslav Đukić (from January 2007)
- Serbian SuperLiga: Runners-up
- Serbian Cup: Semi-finals
- UEFA Cup: Group stage (5th)
- Top goalscorer: League: Nebojša Marinković (10); Obiora Odita (10); All: Nebojša Marinković (14)

The 2006–07 season was FK Partizan's 1st season in Serbian SuperLiga. This article shows player statistics and all matches (official and friendly) that the club played during the 2006–07 season.

== Players ==
=== Squad information ===
Note: Flags indicate national team as defined under FIFA eligibility rules; some limited exceptions apply. Players may hold more than one non-FIFA nationality.

No.	Pos.	Nation	Player
1	GK	CYP	Nikolas Asprogenis
2	DF	SRB	Milivoje Ćirković
3	DF	SRB	Antonio Rukavina
5	DF	BIH	Branimir Bajić
6	MF	SRB	Bojan Zajić
7	MF	MNE	Nenad Brnović
8	FW	CMR	Pierre Boya
10	FW	SRB	Žarko Lazetić
12	DF	SRB	Miloš Mihajlov
13	DF	SRB	Marko Lomić
14	MF	SRB	Đorđe Lazić
15	FW	NGA	Obiora Odita
19	FW	SRB	Ljubiša Vukelja
20	MF	SRB	Nebojša Marinković
21	MF	SRB	Ivan Tomić

No.	Pos.	Nation	Player
23	DF	SRB	Mladen Lazarević
24	DF	SRB	Nemanja Rnić
25	GK	MNE	Ivica Kralj
26	MF	SRB	Miloš Bosančić
27	GK	SRB	Nemanja Jovšić
28	MF	SRB	Albert Nađ
29	FW	SRB	Nenad Marinković
31	MF	SRB	Milan Smiljanić (captain)
32	GK	SVN	Safet Jahič
33	MF	BIH	Darko Maletić
34	MF	SRB	Ivan Radovanović
35	FW	MNE	Stevan Jovetić
36	MF	SRB	Nikola Gulan
37	DF	SRB	Ivan Obradović
38	GK	SRB	Živko Živković

=== Squad statistics ===
No.	Pos.	Name	League		Cup		Europe		Total	
No.	Pos.	Name	Apps	Goals	Apps	Goals	Apps	Goals	Apps	Goals
1	GK	(Cyprus) Nikolas Asprogenis	12	0	1	0	1	0	14	0
2	DF	(Serbia) Milivoje Ćirković	5	0	0	0	2	0	7	0
3	DF	(Serbia) Antonio Rukavina	15	3	2	0	0	0	17	3
5	DF	(Bosnia and Herzegovina) Branimir Bajić	27	3	3	0	6	0	36	3
6	MF	(Serbia) Bojan Zajić	25	3	1	0	7	3	33	6
8	FW	(Cameroon) Pierre Boya	2	0	0	0	2	0	4	0
10	FW	(Serbia) Žarko Lazetić	13	3	2	0	0	0	15	3
12	DF	(Serbia) Miloš Mihajlov	17	1	3	0	3	0	23	1
13	DF	(Serbia) Marko Lomić	21	2	3	1	7	0	31	3
14	MF	(Serbia) Đorđe Lazić	15	1	2	0	0	0	17	1
15	FW	(Nigeria) Obiora Odita	23	10	1	0	6	2	30	12
19	FW	(Serbia) Ljubiša Vukelja	8	0	1	0	5	0	14	0
20	MF	(Serbia) Nebojša Marinković	28	10	3	1	6	3	37	14
21	MF	(Serbia) Ivan Tomić	11	1	2	0	6	0	19	1
23	DF	(Serbia) Mladen Lazarević	9	0	2	0	0	0	11	0
24	DF	(Serbia) Nemanja Rnić	20	0	3	0	7	0	30	0
25	GK	(Montenegro) Ivica Kralj	12	0	2	0	5	0	19	0
26	MF	(Serbia) Miloš Bosančić	19	0	2	0	5	0	26	0
27	GK	(Serbia) Nemanja Jovšić	2	0	0	0	0	0	2	0
28	MF	(Serbia) Albert Nađ	9	1	3	0	1	0	13	1
29	FW	(Serbia) Nenad Marinković	10	1	2	0	3	0	15	1
31	MF	(Serbia) Milan Smiljanić	31	0	3	1	8	0	42	1
32	GK	(Slovenia) Safet Jahič	5	0	0	0	2	0	7	0
33	MF	(Bosnia and Herzegovina) Darko Maletić	16	2	1	0	0	0	17	2
34	MF	(Serbia) Ivan Radovanović	0	0	2	0	0	0	2	0
35	FW	(Montenegro) Stevan Jovetić	22	1	4	3	0	0	26	4
36	MF	(Serbia) Nikola Gulan	8	0	0	0	1	0	9	0
37	DF	(Serbia) Ivan Obradović	5	0	0	0	0	0	5	0
38	GK	(Serbia) Živko Živković	0	0	0	0	0	0	0	0
Players sold or loaned out during the season
3	DF	(Montenegro) Niša Saveljić	1	0	0	0	0	0	1	0
4	DF	(Serbia) Nenad Đorđević	13	2	0	0	8	0	21	2
9	FW	(Montenegro) Srđan Radonjić	1	0	0	0	1	0	2	0
10	MF	(Bulgaria) Asen Nikolov	2	0	1	0	0	0	3	0
11	FW	(North Macedonia) Aco Stojkov	0	0	1	0	0	0	1	0
16	DF	(Serbia) Dragan Radosavljević	7	0	2	0	5	0	14	0
17	FW	(Serbia) Marko Markovski	5	0	2	2	3	0	10	2
18	MF	(Serbia) Predrag Lazić	10	1	1	0	6	0	17	1
27	GK	(Serbia) Đorđe Pantić	3	0	1	0	0	0	4	0
30	FW	(Serbia) Nenad Mirosavljević	10	1	0	0	5	1	15	2

=== In ===
Date	Pos.	Name	From	Fee	Ref.
June 2006	FW	(Serbia) Ljubiša Vukelja	(Serbia) Vojvodina	Undisclosed	
June 2006	DF	(Serbia) Miloš Mihajlov	(Serbia) Voždovac	Undisclosed	
June 2006	DF	(Serbia) Dragan Radosavljević	(Serbia) Smederevo	Undisclosed	
June 2006	MF	(Serbia) Predrag Lazić	(Serbia) BSK Borča	Undisclosed	
June 2006	DF	(Serbia) Mladen Lazarević	(Serbia) Zemun	Undisclosed	
July 2006	MF	(Serbia) Bojan Zajić	(Serbia) BASK	Undisclosed	
July 2006	FW	(North Macedonia) Aco Stojkov	(Belgium) La Louvière	Undisclosed	
July 2006	FW	(Serbia) Marko Markovski	(Serbia) Zemun	Undisclosed	
August 2006	FW	(Serbia) Nenad Mirosavljević	(Spain) Cádiz	Undisclosed	
August 2006	GK	(Slovenia) Safet Jahič	(Greece) Panionios	Undisclosed	
August 2006	MF	(Bulgaria) Asen Nikolov	(Azerbaijan) Turan Tovuz	Undisclosed	
September 2006	MF	(Bosnia and Herzegovina) Darko Maletić	(Romania) Vaslui	Undisclosed	
January 2007	FW	(Serbia) Žarko Lazetić	(Serbia) Bežanija	Undisclosed	
January 2007	DF	(Serbia) Antonio Rukavina	(Serbia) Bežanija	Undisclosed	
January 2007	MF	(Serbia) Đorđe Lazić	(Serbia) Mladost Lučani	Undisclosed	

=== Out ===
Date	Pos.	Name	To	Fee	Ref.
June 2006	MF	(Serbia) Miroslav Radović	(Poland) Legia Warsaw	Undisclosed	
August 2006	FW	(Serbia) Nikola Grubješić	(Russia) KAMAZ	Undisclosed	
August 2006	MF	(Serbia) Branimir Petrović	(Russia) KAMAZ	Undisclosed	
August 2006	MF	(Serbia) Stefan Babović	Unattached	Released	
August 2006	DF	(Montenegro) Niša Saveljić	Unattached	Released	
September 2006	MF	(Bulgaria) Asen Nikolov	Unattached	Released	
December 2006	GK	(Serbia) Đorđe Pantić	(Germany) TuS Koblenz	Undisclosed	
January 2007	FW	(North Macedonia) Aco Stojkov	Unattached	Released	
January 2007	FW	(Montenegro) Srđan Radonjić	(Denmark) Odense	Undisclosed	
February 2007	DF	(Serbia) Nenad Đorđević	(Japan) JEF United	Undisclosed	

=== Loan out ===
Date from	Date to	Pos.	Name	To	Ref.
June 2006	June 2007	MF	(North Macedonia) Perica Stančeski	(Serbia) Bežanija	
July 2006	December 2006	FW	(Serbia) Borko Veselinović	(Serbia) Bežanija	
July 2006	December 2006	FW	(Bosnia and Herzegovina) Admir Aganović	(Serbia) Dinamo Vranje	
July 2006	December 2006	MF	(North Macedonia) Ostoja Stjepanović	(Serbia) Dinamo Vranje	
July 2006	December 2006	DF	(Montenegro) Bojan Šljivančanin	(Montenegro) Rudar Pljevlja	
July 2006	December 2006	GK	(Serbia) Nemanja Jovšić	(Serbia) Smederevo	
July 2006	December 2006	MF	(Serbia) Vladimir Vukajlović	(Serbia) Teleoptik	
July 2006	December 2006	DF	(Serbia) Milan Perendija	(Serbia) Voždovac	
August 2006	June 2007	DF	(Serbia) Milovan Milović	(Serbia) Bežanija	
January 2007	June 2007	FW	(Bosnia and Herzegovina) Admir Aganović	(Serbia) Zemun	
January 2007	June 2007	DF	(Montenegro) Bojan Šljivančanin	(Serbia) Teleoptik	
January 2007	June 2007	FW	(Serbia) Nenad Mirosavljević	(Spain) Vecindario	
January 2007	June 2007	MF	(Serbia) Predrag Lazić	(Serbia) Bežanija	
January 2007	June 2007	FW	(Serbia) Borko Veselinović	(Portugal) Beira-Mar	
January 2007	June 2007	DF	(Serbia) Marko Marović	(Serbia) Radnički Pirot	
January 2007	June 2007	MF	(Serbia) Vladimir Vukajlović	(Serbia) Bežanija	
February 2007	June 2007	DF	(Serbia) Dragan Radosavljević	(Serbia) Bežanija	
February 2007	June 2007	FW	(Serbia) Marko Markovski	(Serbia) Borac Čačak	
February 2007	June 2007	DF	(Serbia) Milan Perendija	(North Macedonia) Vardar	
February 2007	June 2007	MF	(North Macedonia) Ostoja Stjepanović	(North Macedonia) Vardar	

== Competitions ==
=== Overview ===
Competition	Record							
Competition	P	W	D	L	GF	GA	GD	Win %
Superliga	32	18	3	11	47	31	+16	56.25
Serbian Cup	4	3	0	1	10	1	+9	75.00
UEFA Cup	8	2	2	4	9	12	−3	25.00
Total	44	23	5	16	66	44	+22	52.27

=== Serbian SuperLiga ===
==== First stage ====
Pos	Team	Pld	W	D	L	GF	GA	GD	Pts	Qualification
1	Red Star Belgrade	22	16	3	3	37	16	+21	51	Qualification for championship round
2	Partizan	22	13	3	6	32	20	+12	42	Qualification for championship round
3	Vojvodina	22	11	4	7	23	16	+7	37	Qualification for championship round
4	Mladost Apatin	22	9	8	5	19	13	+6	35	Qualification for championship round
5	Hajduk Kula	22	11	2	9	21	21	0	35	Qualification for championship round

Source: RSSSF.org
Rules for classification: 1) points; 2) goal difference; 3) number of goals scored.

Date	Round	Opponents	Ground	Result	Scorers
5 August 2006	1	Bežanija	A	4 – 3	Odita 27' 55' 63' P. Lazić 49'
13 August 2006	2	Voždovac	A	3 – 1	Tomić 16' Neb. Marinković 62' Zajić 69'
19 August 2006	3	Banat Zrenjanin	H	2 – 0	Neb. Marinković 86' Odita 90'
27 August 2006	4	Vojvodina	A	0 – 1	
9 September 2006	5	OFK Beograd	H	0 – 1	
17 September 2006	6	Mladost Apatin	A	0 – 1	
23 September 2006	7	Crvena zvezda	H	0 – 0	
1 October 2006	8	Smederevo	A	2 – 2	Zajić 24' Neb. Marinković 53'
15 October 2006	9	Zemun	H	2 – 0	Neb. Marinković 20' Đorđević 47'
21 October 2006	10	Hajduk Kula	A	1 – 0	Odita 66'
28 October 2006	11	Borac Čačak	H	2 – 0	Jovetić 67' Odita 81'
5 November 2006	12	Bežanija	H	1 – 3	Odita 56'
11 November 2006	13	Voždovac	H	2 – 0	Neb. Marinković 5' Đorđević 21'
18 November 2006	14	Banat Zrenjanin	A	2 – 1	Neb. Marinković 13' Mirosavljević 34'
26 November 2006	15	Vojvodina	H	0 – 1	
3 December 2006	16	OFK Beograd	A	1 – 1	Maletić 4'
17 February 2007	17	Mladost Apatin	H	1 – 0	Neb. Marinković 70'
24 February 2007	18	Crvena zvezda	A	4 – 2	Mihajlov 38' Bajić 56' Neb. Marinković 67' Lazetić 86'
3 March 2007	19	Smederevo	H	2 – 1	Odita 78' Lomić 90'
10 March 2007	20	Zemun	A	2 – 1	Bogunović 22' (o.g.) Neb. Marinković 70'
18 March 2007	21	Hajduk Kula	H	0 – 1	
1 April 2007	22	Borac Čačak	A	1 – 0	Neb. Marinković 56'

==== Championship round ====
Pos	Team	Pld	W	D	L	GF	GA	GD	Pts	Qualification
1	Red Star Belgrade (C)	32	23	5	4	55	27	+28	74	Qualification for Champions League second qualifying round
2	Partizan	32	18	3	11	47	31	+16	57	Qualification for UEFA Cup first qualifying round
3	Vojvodina	32	16	6	10	38	25	+13	54	Qualification for UEFA Cup first qualifying round
4	Bežanija	32	12	12	8	36	31	+5	48	Qualification for UEFA Cup first qualifying round
5	Hajduk Kula	32	14	4	14	29	30	−1	46	Qualification for Intertoto Cup second round
6	Mladost Apatin	32	11	8	13	25	33	−8	41	

Source: RSSSF.org
Rules for classification: 1) points; 2) goal difference; 3) number of goals scored.
(C) Champions

Date	Round	Opponents	Ground	Result	Scorers
7 April 2007	1	Hajduk Kula	H	2 – 0	Nađ 55' Đ. Lazić 58'
11 April 2007	2	Crvena zvezda	A	0 – 1	
22 April 2007	3	Vojvodina	H	1 – 0	Odita 85'
28 April 2007	4	Mladost Apatin	A	2 – 0	Odita 49' Nen. Marinković 88'
7 April 2007	5	Hajduk Kula	A	0 – 3	
2 May 2007	6	Crvena zvezda	H	1 – 2	Rukavina 49'
12 May 2007	7	Bežanija	A	1 – 2	Rukavina 82'
20 May 2007	8	Vojvodina	A	0 – 2	
26 May 2007	9	Mladost Apatin	H	7 – 1	Rukavina 16' Lazetić 24' 85' Zajić 36' Bajić 39' 71' Maletić 66'

=== UEFA Cup ===
Date	Round	Opponents	Ground	Result	Scorers
10 August 2006	Second qualifying round	(Slovenia) Maribor	H	2 – 1	Odita 28' 30'
24 August 2006	Second qualifying round	(Slovenia) Maribor	A	1 – 1	Zajić 30'
14 September 2006	First round	(Netherlands) Groningen	H	4 – 2	Neb. Marinković 4' 43' Zajić 16' 90'
28 September 2006	First round	(Netherlands) Groningen	A	0 – 1	
2 November 2006	Group stage	(Italy) Livorno	H	1 – 1	Mirosavljević 70'
23 November 2006	Group stage	(Israel) Maccabi Haifa	A	0 – 1	
29 November 2006	Group stage	(France) Auxerre	H	1 – 4	Neb. Marinković 5'
14 December 2006	Group stage	(Scotland) Rangers	A	0 – 1	

== See also ==
- List of FK Partizan seasons
