= 2004–05 FK Partizan season =

Partizan
2004–05 season
- President: Ivan Ćurković
- Head coach: Vladimir Vermezović
- First League of Serbia and Montenegro: Winners
- Serbia and Montenegro Cup: Semi-finals
- UEFA Cup: Round of 16
- Top goalscorer: League: Ilić (16); All: Ilić (19)

The 2004–05 season was the 59th season in FK Partizan's existence. This article shows player statistics and all matches (official and friendly) that the club played during the 2004–05 season.

== Players ==
=== Squad information ===
Note: Flags indicate national team as defined under FIFA eligibility rules; some limited exceptions apply. Players may hold more than one non-FIFA nationality.

No.	Pos.	Nation	Player
1	MF	SCG	Simon Vukčević
2	DF	SCG	Milivoje Ćirković
4	DF	SCG	Zoran Mirković
5	DF	BIH	Branimir Bajić
7	MF	SCG	Nenad Brnović
8	FW	CMR	Pierre Boya
9	FW	SCG	Srđan Radonjić
10	MF	SCG	Dragan Ćirić
11	MF	SCG	Miroslav Radović
12	GK	SCG	Nemanja Jovšić
13	DF	KOR	Kim Chi-woo (on loan from Incheon United)
14	DF	SCG	Nenad Đorđević
15	FW	NGA	Obiora Odita
16	DF	NGA	Ifeanyi Emeghara
18	MF	SCG	Branimir Petrović

No.	Pos.	Nation	Player
20	DF	SCG	Milovan Milović
21	MF	SCG	Ivan Tomić
22	MF	SCG	Saša Ilić (captain)
24	DF	SCG	Nemanja Rnić
25	GK	SCG	Ivica Kralj
27	GK	SCG	Đorđe Pantić
28	MF	SCG	Albert Nađ
30	GK	CYP	Nikolas Asprogenis
31	DF	SCG	Srđa Knežević
34	FW	SCG	Nikola Grubješić
37	DF	SCG	Tomislav Pajović
43	MF	BIH	Milan Srećo
44	MF	SCG	Stefan Babović
47	MF	SCG	Milan Smiljanić
50	MF	SCG	Nenad Marinković

== Transfers ==
=== In ===
Date	Pos.	Name	From	Fee	Ref.
May 2004	MF	(Serbia and Montenegro) Ivan Tomić	(Spain) Rayo Vallecano	Undisclosed	
June 2004	GK	(Cyprus) Nikolas Asprogenis	(Cyprus) Apollon Limassol	Undisclosed	
June 2004	DF	(Serbia and Montenegro) Ivan Babić	(Serbia and Montenegro) Napredak Kruševac	Undisclosed	
June 2004	MF	(Serbia and Montenegro) Nenad Brnović	(Serbia and Montenegro) Zeta	Undisclosed	
June 2004	MF	(Serbia and Montenegro) Branimir Petrović	(Serbia and Montenegro) Zeta	Undisclosed	
June 2004	MF	(Serbia and Montenegro) Dragan Ćirić	(Spain) Valladolid	Undisclosed	
June 2004	DF	(Nigeria) Ifeanyi Emeghara	(Serbia and Montenegro) Teleoptik	Undisclosed	
January 2005	FW	(Nigeria) Obiora Odita	(Serbia and Montenegro) Javor Ivanjica	Undisclosed	

=== Out ===
Date	Pos.	Name	To	Fee	Ref.
June 2004	DF	(North Macedonia) Milan Stojanoski	(Cyprus) APOEL	Undisclosed	
June 2004	GK	(Serbia and Montenegro) Radovan Radaković	(Austria) Sturm Graz	Undisclosed	
July 2004	MF	(Serbia and Montenegro) Ljubinko Drulović	(Portugal) Penafiel	Undisclosed	
July 2004	FW	(Serbia and Montenegro) Ivica Iliev	(Italy) Messina	Undisclosed	
July 2004	MF	(Serbia and Montenegro) Vladimir Ivić	(Germany) Borussia Mönchengladbach	Undisclosed	
August 2004	DF	(Bosnia and Herzegovina) Nenad Mišković	(Belgium) Cercle Brugge	Undisclosed	

=== Loan in ===
Date from	Date to	Pos.	Name	From	Ref.
January 2005	June 2005	DF	(South Korea) Kim Chi-woo	(South Korea) Incheon United	

=== Loan out ===
Date from	Date to	Pos.	Name	To	Ref.
July 2004	June 2005	DF	(Serbia and Montenegro) Dejan Ognjanović	(Portugal) Estoril	
January 2005	June 2005	DF	(Serbia and Montenegro) Ivan Babić	(Serbia and Montenegro) Obilić	
January 2005	June 2005	FW	(Serbia and Montenegro) Bojan Brnović	(Serbia and Montenegro) Obilić	
January 2005	June 2005	MF	(Serbia and Montenegro) Nebojša Marinković	(Serbia and Montenegro) Obilić	
January 2005	June 2005	FW	(Serbia and Montenegro) Borko Veselinović	(Serbia and Montenegro) Obilić	

== Friendlies ==
10 July 2004 Friendly	Partizan (Serbia and Montenegro)	2–2 (5–4 p)	(Croatia) Rijeka	Zenica, Bosnia and Herzegovina
	Đorđević 33'; Ćirić 83' (pen.)		Linić 68' 71' (pen.)

11 July 2004 Friendly	Partizan (Serbia and Montenegro)	0–1	(Croatia) Osijek	Zenica, Bosnia and Herzegovina
			Primorac 52'	Stadium: Bilino Polje Stadium; Attendance: 5,000

18 July 2004 Friendly	Hertha BSC (Germany)	2–1	(Serbia and Montenegro) Partizan	Erlenmoos, Germany
	Hartman 13'; Vihnjarek 22'		Rnić 54'	Attendance: 2,000

20 July 2004 Friendly	FV Olympia Laupheim (Germany)	1–1	(Serbia and Montenegro) Partizan	Laupheim, Germany
	Melčerčik 69' (pen.)		Radonjić 76'	Stadium: Olympia-Stadion; Attendance: 1,000

21 July 2004 Alpen Cup Semi-finals	Beşiktaş (Turkey)	0–0 (4–5 p)	(Serbia and Montenegro) Partizan	Kempten, Germany
				Stadium: Olympia-Stadion; Attendance: 3,500; Referee: Knut Kirher

22 July 2004 Alpen Cup Final	Partizan (Serbia and Montenegro)	1–0	(Netherlands) Feyenoord	Sonthofen, Germany
	Vukčević 32'			Attendance: 2,000; Referee: Herman Albreht

24 July 2004 Friendly	Galatasaray (Turkey)	2–0	(Serbia and Montenegro) Partizan	Augsburg, Germany
	Şaş 48'; Karan 90'			Stadium: Rosenaustadion; Attendance: 10,000; Referee: Herman Albreht

31 July 2004 Friendly	Smederevo	0–2	Partizan	Smederevo
			Ilić 4'; Ćirić 61' (pen.)	Attendance: 2,000; Referee: Goran Stanojević

3 August 2004 Kappa Cup Semi-finals	Real Betis (Spain)	1–0	(Serbia and Montenegro) Partizan	Sevilla, Spain
	Lembo 56'			Attendance: 7,000; Referee: Los Santos Omar

5 August 2004 Kappa Cup Third place game	Partizan (Serbia and Montenegro)	1–1 (1–0 p)	(England) Tottenham Hotspur	Sevilla, Spain
	Boya 53'		Defoe 43'	Attendance: 1,500; Referee: Ramon del Olmo Codes

25 January 2005 Friendly	Basel (Switzerland)	1–0	(Serbia and Montenegro) Partizan	Belek, Turkey
	Chipperfield 42'			Referee: Cihan Burgan

27 January 2005 Friendly	St. Gallen (Switzerland)	0–2	(Serbia and Montenegro) Partizan	Belek, Turkey
			Brnović 22'; Ćirković 23'	Referee: Laslhober

29 January 2005 Friendly	Partizan (Serbia and Montenegro)	0–0	(Ukraine) Obolon-Brovar Kyiv	Belek, Turkey

31 January 2005 Friendly	Grasshoppers (Switzerland)	2–0	(Serbia and Montenegro) Partizan	Belek, Turkey
	Muff 64'; Salatić 73'

2 February 2005 Friendly	Partizan (Serbia and Montenegro)	0–0	(South Korea) Incheon United	Belek, Turkey

4 February 2005 Friendly	Partizan (Serbia and Montenegro)	2–0	(Austria) SV Mattersburg	Belek, Turkey
	Grubješić 31'; Odita 60'			Referee: Lubomir Udvardi

5 February 2005 Friendly	Partizan (Serbia and Montenegro)	0–1	(Croatia) Hajduk Split	Belek, Turkey
			Dragičević 74'

== Competitions ==
=== Overview ===
Competition	Record							
Competition	P	W	D	L	GF	GA	GD	Win %
SCG SuperLiga	30	25	5	0	81	20	+61	83.33
SCG Cup	4	3	0	1	8	4	+4	75.00
UEFA Cup	12	4	6	2	15	12	+3	33.33
Total	46	32	11	3	104	36	+68	69.57

==== League table ====
Pos	Team	Pld	W	D	L	GF	GA	GD	Pts	Qualification or relegation
1	Partizan (C)	30	25	5	0	81	20	+61	80	Qualification for Champions League second qualifying round
2	Red Star Belgrade	30	23	5	2	66	18	+48	74	Qualification for UEFA Cup second qualifying round
3	Zeta	30	18	5	7	52	30	+22	59	Qualification for UEFA Cup second qualifying round
4	OFK Beograd	30	16	2	12	51	36	+15	50	Qualification for UEFA Cup second qualifying round
5	Zemun	30	12	7	11	31	34	−3	43	Ineligible for 2005–06 European competitions

Source: RSSSF.org
Rules for classification: 1) points; 2) goal difference; 3) number of goals scored.
(C) Champions

8 August 2004 1	Sutjeska	1–4	Partizan	Nikšić
	Tucaković 44'		Ilić 19', 33', 52'; Radonjić 41'	Stadium: Gradski stadion (Nikšić)

15 August 2004 2	Partizan	1–1	Borac Čačak	Belgrade
	Ilić 26'		Stojanović 79' (pen.)	Stadium: Partizan Stadium; Attendance: 2,500

21 August 2004 3	Partizan	5–0	Hajduk Kula	Belgrade
	Vukčević 78'; Grubješić 79', 86'; Đorđević 88'; Radonjić 90'			Stadium: Partizan Stadium; Attendance: 2,000; Referee: Igor Janković

29 August 2004 4	Smederevo	1–3	Partizan	Smederevo
	Tadić 77'		Radonjić 4', 54', 70'	Stadium: Smederevo City Stadium

11 September 2004 5	Partizan	1–0	Radnički	Belgrade
	Grubješić 70'			Stadium: Partizan Stadium; Attendance: 1,500; Referee: Ranko Spasojević

19 September 2004 6	Budućnost	0–2	Partizan	Podgorica
			Radonjić 16'; Perišić 20' (o.g.)	Stadium: Podgorica City Stadium; Attendance: 8,000; Referee: Goran Jovanović

25 September 2004 7	Partizan	4–1	Obilić	Belgrade
	Boya; Ilić; Grubješić			Stadium: Partizan Stadium

3 October 2004 8	Železnik	1–2	Partizan	Belgrade
	Tasić 24'		Radonjić 63'; Jozić 87' (o.g.)	Stadium: Železnik Stadium; Attendance: 2,000; Referee: Dejan Delević

16 October 2004 9	Partizan	0–0	Crvena zvezda	Belgrade
				Stadium: Partizan Stadium; Attendance: 20,000; Referee: Dragomir Tanović

23 October 2004 10	OFK Beograd	0–2	Partizan	Belgrade
			Brnović 41'; Radonjić 65' (pen.)	Stadium: Omladinski Stadium; Attendance: 3,000; Referee: Mihajlo Jeknić

30 October 2004 11	Partizan	1–0	Vojvodina	Belgrade
	Vukčević 66'			Stadium: Partizan Stadium; Attendance: 1,000; Referee: Nebojša Šijaković

7 November 2004 12	Zemun	0–5	Partizan	Belgrade
			Grubješić 11'; Ćirić 33'; Ilić 65' (pen.); Petrović 81'; Nađ 83'	Stadium: Zemun Stadium; Attendance: 2,000

20 November 2004 13	Partizan	3–2	Zeta	Belgrade
	Boya 4'; Ilić 33' (pen.); Brnović 86'		Rašković 54'; Trajković 78'	Stadium: Partizan Stadium; Attendance: 1,000; Referee: D. Dedić

28 November 2004 14	Hajduk Beograd	0–3	Partizan	Belgrade
			Ćirić 39' (pen.); Vukčević 77', 79'	Stadium: Stadion Hajduk Lion; Attendance: 2,500; Referee: Milenko Vukadinović

5 December 2004 15	Partizan	3–1	Čukarički Stankom	Belgrade
	Radović 10'; Vukčević 60'; Nađ 88' (pen.)		Milović 51' (o.g.)	Stadium: Partizan Stadium; Attendance: 2,000; Referee: Goran Leković

26 March 2005* 16	Partizan	3–0	Sutjeska	Belgrade
	Ćirić 26' (pen.); Milović 33'; Grubješić 88'			Stadium: Partizan Stadium; Attendance: 1,500; Referee: Goran Vićentijević

13 April 2005* 17	Borac Čačak	1–3	Partizan	Čačak
	Stojanović 85'		Odita 18'; Ilić 30'; Rnić 74'	Stadium: Čačak Stadium; Attendance: 6,000; Referee: Dejan Andrejić

13 March 2005 18	Hajduk Kula	0–1	Partizan	Kula
			Antić 81' (o.g.)	Stadium: Stadion Hajduk; Attendance: 5,000

20 March 2005 19	Partizan	4–1	Smederevo	Belgrade
	Brnović 42', 83'; Radonjić 69'; Grubješić 89'		Divić 68'	Stadium: Partizan Stadium; Attendance: 1,500; Referee: Dejan Andrejić

3 April 2005 20	Radnički	1–2	Partizan	Belgrade
	Pavlović 37'		Ilić 9'; Mirković 60'	Stadium: Novi Beograd Stadium; Referee: Dragutin Dedić

9 April 2005 21	Partizan	1–0	Budućnost	Belgrade
	Odita 1'			Stadium: Partizan Stadium; Attendance: 1,500; Referee: Dejan Jović

16 April 2005 22	Obilić	0–4	Partizan	Belgrade
			Brnović 6'; Ilić 46'; Vukčević 71'; Odita 73'	Stadium: FK Obilić Stadium; Attendance: 1,500; Referee: Dejan Delević

20 April 2005 23	Partizan	4–1	Železnik	Belgrade
	Vukčević 20'; Odita 69'; Brnović 78'; Grubješić 90'		Drinić 31'	Stadium: Partizan Stadium; Attendance: 1,000; Referee: Darko Stojanović

23 April 2005 24	Crvena zvezda	1–1	Partizan	Belgrade
	Pantelić 12'		Đorđević 22'	Stadium: Rajko Mitić Stadium; Attendance: 35,000; Referee: Dragomir Tanović

30 April 2005 25	Partizan	3–2	OFK Beograd	Belgrade
	Ilić 19', 28'; Rnić 51'		Stolica 64'; Baković 86'	Stadium: Partizan Stadium; Attendance: 3,000

4 May 2005 26	Vojvodina	1–3	Partizan	Novi Sad
	Vukelja 48'		Pekarić 71' (o.g.); Ilić 76' (pen.) 85' (pen.)	Stadium: Karađorđe Stadium; Attendance: 5,000; Referee: Dejan Andrejić

7 May 2005 27	Partizan	3–1	Zemun	Belgrade
	Vukčević 43' (pen.); Odita 53', 62'		Teodorović 70'	Stadium: Partizan Stadium; Attendance: 3,500; Referee: Vladimir Jovanović

14 May 2005 28	Zeta	1–1	Partizan	Golubovci
	Mešter 63'		Vukčević 3'	Stadium: Stadion Trešnjica; Attendance: 3,500

21 May 2005 29	Partizan	7–0	Hajduk Beograd	Belgrade
	Ilić 25'; Radonjić 29'; Radović 36'; Grubješić 54', 60', 87'; Babović 71'			Stadium: Partizan Stadium; Attendance: 10,000; Referee: Miroslav Vukadinović

28 May 2005 30	Čukarički Stankom	2–2	Partizan	Belgrade
	Spasojević 7', 53'		Ilić 21'; Vukčević 38'	Stadium: Stadion Čukarički; Attendance: 1,500; Referee: Svetislav Marušić

=== Serbia and Montenegro Cup ===
11 September 2004 First round	Partizan	4–1	Radnički Beograd	Belgrade
	Grubješić 17', 55', 80'; Radonjić 31'		Perović 85'	Stadium: Partizan Stadium

27 October 2004 Second round	Vojvodina	1–3	Partizan	Novi Sad
	Govedarica 59'		Radonjić 6'; Brnović 27'; Grubješić 56'	Stadium: Karađorđe Stadium; Attendance: 8,000; Referee: Goran Jovanović

10 November 2004 Quarter-finals	Partizan	1–0	Obilić	Belgrade
	Ilić 76' (pen.)			Stadium: Partizan Stadium; Referee: Mihajlo Jeknić

11 May 2005 Semi-finals	Crvena zvezda	2–0	Partizan	Belgrade
	Žigić 10'; Krivokapić 90+3'			Stadium: Red Star Stadium; Attendance: 10,000; Referee: Dragomir Tanović

=== UEFA Cup ===
==== Second Qualifying Round ====
12 August 2004 QR2	Oţelul Galaţi (Romania)	0–0	(Serbia and Montenegro) Partizan	Constanţa, Romania
19:00		Report		Stadium: Stadionul Farul; Attendance: 1,000; Referee: Fritz Stuchlik (Austria)

26 August 2004 QR2	Partizan (Serbia and Montenegro)	1–0 (1–0 agg.)	(Romania) Oţelul Galaţi	Belgrade, Serbia and Montenegro
19:30	Radonjić 29'	Report		Stadium: Partizan Stadium; Attendance: 6,000; Referee: Eduardo Iturralde González (Spain)

==== First round ====
16 September 2004 First round	Partizan (Serbia and Montenegro)	3–1	(Romania) Dinamo București	Belgrade, Serbia and Montenegro
20:00	Tomić 53'; Boya 54'; Brnović 85'	Report	Dănciulescu 24'	Stadium: Stadion FK Partizan; Attendance: 14,000; Referee: Knud Erik Fisker (Denmark)

30 September 2004 First round	Dinamo București (Romania)	0–0 (1–3 agg.)	(Serbia and Montenegro) Partizan	Bucharest, Romania
19:00		Report		Stadium: Stadionul Național; Attendance: 18,000; Referee: Stéphane Bré (France)

==== Group E ====
Pos	Team	Pld	W	D	L	GF	GA	GD	Pts	Qualification	MID	VIL	PTZ	LAZ	EGA
1	(England) Middlesbrough	4	3	0	1	6	2	+4	9	Advance to knockout stage	—	—	3–0	2–0	—
2	(Spain) Villarreal	4	2	2	0	8	2	+6	8	Advance to knockout stage	2–0	—	—	—	4–0
3	(Serbia and Montenegro) Partizan	4	1	2	1	7	6	+1	5	Advance to knockout stage	—	1–1	—	—	4–0
4	(Italy) Lazio	4	0	3	1	5	7	−2	3		—	1–1	2–2	—	—
5	(Greece) Egaleo	4	0	1	3	2	11	−9	1		0–1	—	—	2–2	—

Source: RSSSF

4 November 2004 1	Partizan (Serbia and Montenegro)	4–0	(Greece) Egaleo	Belgrade, Serbia and Montenegro
19:00	Christou 22' (o.g.); Ilić 55', 60'; Vukčević 68'	Report		Stadium: Partizan Stadium; Attendance: 15,000; Referee: Paulo Costa (Portugal)

25 November 2004 2	Lazio (Italy)	2–2	(Serbia and Montenegro) Partizan	Rome, Italy
21:00	Di Canio 52'; Inzaghi 73'	Report	Boya 6', 24'	Stadium: Stadio Olimpico; Attendance: 17,000; Referee: Anton Stredak (Slovakia)

2 December 2004 3	Partizan (Serbia and Montenegro)	1–1	(Spain) Villarreal	Belgrade, Serbia and Montenegro
20:45	Tomić 65' (pen.)	Report	Cazorla 17'	Stadium: Partizan Stadium; Attendance: 25,000; Referee: Nicolai Vollquartz (Denmark)

15 December 2004 4	Middlesbrough (England)	3–0	(Serbia and Montenegro) Partizan	Middlesbrough, England
20:45	Németh 10'; Job 22'; Morrison 90'	Report		Stadium: Riverside Stadium; Attendance: 20,856; Referee: Grzegorz Gilewski (Poland)

==== Round of 32 ====
16 February 2005 Round of 32	Partizan (Serbia and Montenegro)	2–2	(Ukraine) Dnipro Dnipropetrovsk	Belgrade, Serbia and Montenegro
17:00	Odita 12', 45'	Report	Nazarenko 28'; Rusol 57'	Stadium: Stadion FK Partizan; Attendance: 15,000; Referee: Martin Hansson (Sweden)

24 February 2005 Round of 32	Dnipro Dnipropetrovsk (Ukraine)	0–1 (2–3 agg.)	(Serbia and Montenegro) Partizan	Dnipropetrovsk, Ukraine
17:00		Report	Radović 88'	Stadium: Meteor Stadium; Attendance: 14,000; Referee: Helmut Fleischer (Germany)

==== Round of 16 ====
10 March 2005 Round of 16	Partizan (Serbia and Montenegro)	1–1	(Russia) CSKA Moscow	Belgrade, Serbia and Montenegro
17:00	Tomić 83' (pen.)	Report	Aldonin 17'	Stadium: Stadion FK Partizan; Attendance: 20,000; Referee: Jan Wegereef (Netherlands)

17 March 2005 Round of 16	CSKA Moscow (Russia)	2–0 (3–1 agg.)	(Serbia and Montenegro) Partizan	Krasnodar, Russia
17:00	Carvalho 68'; Vágner Love 84' (pen.)	Report		Stadium: Kuban Stadium; Attendance: 23,000; Referee: Gianluca Paparesta (Italy)

== See also ==
- List of FK Partizan seasons
- List of unbeaten football club seasons
