= 2000–01 FK Partizan season =

Partizan
2000–01 season
- President: Ivan Ćurković
- Head coach: Ljubiša Tumbaković
- First League of FR Yugoslavia: Runners-up
- FR Yugoslavia Cup: Winners
- UEFA Cup: First round
- Top goalscorer: League: Vladimir Ivić (20 goals); All: Saša Ilić (26 goals)

The 2000–01 season was FK Partizan's 9th season in First League of FR Yugoslavia. This article shows player statistics and all matches (official and friendly) that the club played during the 2000–01 season.

== Competitions ==
=== First League of FR Yugoslavia ===
==== League table ====
Pos	Team	Pld	W	D	L	GF	GA	GD	Pts	Qualification or relegation
1	Red Star Belgrade (C)	34	28	4	2	93	20	+73	88	Qualification for Champions League second qualifying round
2	Partizan	34	28	2	4	94	36	+58	86	Qualification for UEFA Cup qualifying round
3	Obilić	34	19	6	9	53	37	+16	63	Qualification for UEFA Cup qualifying round
4	Sartid	34	17	3	14	49	47	+2	54	Qualification for Intertoto Cup first round
5	OFK Beograd	34	15	5	14	52	45	+7	50	

Source: RSSSF.org
Rules for classification: 1) points; 2) goal difference; 3) number of goals scored.
(C) Champions

12 August 2000 1	Partizan	3–0	Obilić	Belgrade
	Ćirković 33'; Ivić 51'; Iliev 72'			Stadium: Stadion JNA; Attendance: 6,000

19 August 2000 2	Sartid	3–2	Partizan	Smederevo
			Iliev 32', 66'	Attendance: 15,000

26 August 2000 3	Partizan	2–0	Budućnost	Belgrade
	Iliev 22'; Ilić 85'			Stadium: Stadion JNA

9 September 2000 4	Radnički Kragujevac	1–3	Partizan	Kragujevac
			Trobok 45', 70'; Ivić 73'	Attendance: 20,000

17 September 2000 5	Partizan	4–0	Napredak Kruševac	Belgrade
	Ivić 22'; Peković 52'; Vukić 75', 79'			Stadium: Stadion JNA; Attendance: 400

23 September 2000 6	Železnik	3–2	Partizan	Belgrade
			Ivić 8'; Ilić 60'	Attendance: 4,500

1 October 2000 7	Partizan	1–0	Milicionar	Belgrade
	Ivić 90'			Stadium: Stadion JNA; Attendance: 300

21 October 2000 8	Partizan	4–1	Zeta	Belgrade
	Vukić 17'; Trobok 33'; Ilić 56'; Delibašić 66'			Stadium: Stadion JNA; Attendance: 0*

28 October 2000 9	Rad	1–3	Partizan	Belgrade
			Ivić 45', 46', 50'	Attendance: 0*

4 November 2000 10	Partizan	4–0	Sutjeska	Belgrade
	Ilić 25' (pen.), 90'; Duljaj 58'; Jeremić 88'			Stadium: Stadion JNA; Attendance: 1,000

11 November 2000 11	Vojvodina	0–1	Partizan	Novi Sad
			Ilić 43'	Attendance: 6,000

18 November 2000 12	Partizan	4–1	OFK Beograd	Belgrade
	Ivić 6'; Delibašić 34'; Ilić 62'; Bečanović 83'			Stadium: Stadion JNA; Attendance: 0*

25 November 2000 13	Zemun	0–4	Partizan	Belgrade
			Ilić 5' (pen.); Delibašić 16'; Ivić 34'; Vukić 87'	Attendance: 3,000

29 November 2000 14	Partizan	6–2	Čukarički	Belgrade
	Trobok 14', 86'; Iliev 30'; Mirković 60' (o.g.); Delibašić 68'; Vukić 80'			Stadium: Stadion JNA; Attendance: 1,500

2 December 2000 15	Partizan	4–0	Hajduk Kula	Belgrade
	Gerasimovski 16'; Ivić 27'; Delibašić 42', 51'			Stadium: Stadion JNA; Attendance: 1,200

9 December 2000 16	Radnički Niš	0–4	Partizan	Niš
			Iliev 30'; Ilić 32'; Delibašić 61'; Bečanović 82'	Attendance: 8,000

23 February 2001 17	Obilic	3–1	Partizan	Belgrade
			Ilić 56'	Stadium: Stadion Obilić; Attendance: 4,000

3 March 2001 18	Partizan	3–1	Sartid	Belgrade
	Ivić 4'; Ilić 17'; Delibašić 74'			Stadium: Stadion JNA; Attendance: 2,500

7 March 2001 19	Crvena Zvezda	2–0	Partizan	Belgrade
				Stadium: Marakana; Attendance: 40,000

10 March 2001 20	Buducnost	0–1	Partizan	Podgorica
			Bečanović 65'	Stadium: Stadion Pod goricom Attendance: 7,000

14 March 2001 21	Partizan	4–0	Radnički Kragujevac	Belgrade
				Stadium: Stadion JNA; Attendance: 1,500

17 March 2001 10	Napredak Kruševac	0–0	Partizan	Kruševac
				Stadium: Mladost Stadium; Attendance: 11,000

31 March 2001 10	Partizan	4–2	Zeleznik	Belgrade
				Stadium: Stadion JNA

7 April 2001 10	Milicionar	1–2	Partizan	Beograd

14 April 2001 10	Partizan	2–1	Crvena Zvezda	Belgrade
				Stadium: Stadion JNA

18 April 2001 10	Zeta	0–2	Partizan	Golubovci

28 April 2001 10	Partizan	2–1	Rad	Belgrade
				Stadium: Stadion JNA

5 May 2001 10	Sutjeska	3–4	Partizan	Nikšić
				Stadium: Kraj Bistrice

12 May 2001 10	Partizan	3–1	Vojvodina	Belgrade
				Stadium: Stadion JNA

19 May 2001 10	OFK Beograd	1–2	Partizan	Belgrade
				Stadium: Karaburma

26 May 2001 10	Partizan	4–1	Zemun	Beograd
				Stadium: Stadion JNA

9 June 2001 10	Čukarički	2–3	Partizan	Belgrade

16 June 2001 10	Hajduk Kula	4–4	Partizan	Belgrade
				Stadium: Stadion JNA

20 June 2001 10	Partizan	2–1	Radnički Niš	Belgrade
				Stadium: Stadion JNA

=== FR Yugoslavia Cup ===
7 September 2000 First round	Partizan	4–3	Radnički JP	Belgrade
	Vukić 45', 47'; Iliev 77', 83'			Stadium: Stadion JNA; Attendance: 1,500

8 November 2000 Second round	Mladost Lukićevo	0–5	Partizan	Lukićevo
			Ilić 7', 60'; Vukić 68'; Ivić 71'; Delibašić 86'	Stadium: Stadion Mladosti; Attendance: 3,000

4 April 2001 Quarter-finals	Partizan	3–2	Čukarički	Belgrade
	Iliev 9', 25'; Nedović 66' (pen.)			Stadium: Stadion JNA; Attendance: 1,000

11 April 2001 Semi-finals	Obilić	2–5	Partizan	Belgrade
16:00	Filipović 69'; Simonović 84'		Ivić 18'; Iliev 21', 74'; Bečanović 55'; Delibašić 70'	Stadium: FK Obilić Stadium; Attendance: 4,000

9 May 2001 Final	Crvena Zvezda	0–1	Partizan	Belgrade
17:00			Ilić 65'	Stadium: Marakana; Attendance: 30,000; Referee: Miroslav Radoman (Lovćenac)

=== UEFA Cup ===
==== Qualifying round ====
10 August 2000 Qualifying round 1st leg	Sliema Wanderers (Malta)	2–1	(Federal Republic of Yugoslavia) Partizan	Attard, Malta
	Sylla 10'; Busuttil 72'	Report	Ilić 35'	Stadium: Ta' Qali National Stadium; Referee: Mario van der Ende (Netherlands)

24 August 2000 Qualifying round 2nd leg	Partizan (Federal Republic of Yugoslavia)	4–1 (5–3 agg.)	(Malta) Sliema Wanderers	Belgrade, FR Yugoslavia
	Ilić 4', 32', 45'; Ranković 60'	Report	Turner 90'	Stadium: Stadion FK Partizan; Referee: Muhittin Bosat (Turkey)

==== First round ====
14 September 2000 First round 1st leg	Partizan (Federal Republic of Yugoslavia)	1–1	(Portugal) Porto	Belgrade, FR Yugoslavia
18:00	Ranković 24'	Report	Pena 89'	Stadium: Stadion FK Partizan; Attendance: 23,427; Referee: Paul Allaerts (Belgium)

28 September 2000 First round 2nd leg	Porto (Portugal)	1–0 (2–1 agg.)	(Federal Republic of Yugoslavia) Partizan	Porto, Portugal
	Drulović 90'	Report		Stadium: Estádio das Antas; Attendance: 15,610; Referee: Roelof Luinge (Netherlands)

== See also ==
- List of FK Partizan seasons
- Partizanopedia 2000-2001 (in Serbian)
