= Nikolas Asprogenis =

Cypriot former professional footballer

Nikolas Asprogenous
Personal information
- Full name: Nikolas Asprogenous
- Date of birth: 6 April 1986 (age 40)
- Place of birth: Limassol, Cyprus
- Height: 1.83 m (6 ft 0 in)
- Position: Goalkeeper

Youth career
- Apollon Limassol

Senior career*
Years	Team	Apps	(Gls)
2004–2008	Partizan	17	(0)
2008–2011	Omonia	2	(0)
2010	→ Aris Limassol (loan)	1	(0)
2010–2011	→ Anorthosis (loan)	0	(0)
2011–2012	AEP Paphos		
2012	Ethnikos Assia		
2013	Nikos & Sokratis Erimis		

International career
2003–2004	Cyprus U19	5	(0)
2005–2008	Cyprus U21	9	(0)
- * Club domestic league appearances and goals

Nikolas Asprogenous (Greek: Νικόλας Ασπρογένους; born 6 April 1986) is a Cypriot former professional footballer who played as a goalkeeper.

== Club career ==
On 12 June 2004, Asprogenous signed a four-year contract with Partizan. He received the squad number 30 for the 2004–05 season, but failed to make any appearances in the process. In the following 2005–06 season, Asprogenous made his senior debuts for Partizan, collecting five league appearances. He made his international debut for the club on 14 December 2006, in a 0–1 loss to Rangers at Ibrox Stadium. On 11 April 2007, in the 129th eternal derby against Red Star Belgrade, Asprogenous saved a penalty taken by Red Star player Ognjen Koroman in the 49th minute of the match. Ahead of the 2007–08 season, Asprogenous was placed on the transfer list, before leaving the club at the end of his contract.

In mid-2008, Asprogenous returned to his homeland and signed with Omonia. He was mainly a backup to Antonis Georgallides, appearing in just two league games during the 2008–09 season. In early 2010, Asprogenous was loaned to Aris Limassol. He made one appearance for the club in its 0–5 loss against APOEL. In September 2010, Asprogenous moved to Anorthosis, but failed to make any appearances in the 2010–11 season.

In the summer of 2011, Asprogenous joined Cypriot Second Division side AEP Paphos, helping the club win promotion to the top flight in 2011–12. He subsequently played for Ethnikos Assia and Nikos & Sokratis Erimis.

== International career ==
After representing his country at Under-19 level, Asprogenous made his official debut for the Cyprus U21s in March 2005. He played the full 90 minutes in all eight of his team's games during the European Under-21 Championship 2009 qualifying stage.

In August 2009, Asprogenous received his first call-up to the full squad by manager Angelos Anastasiadis for Cyprus's World Cup 2010 qualifiers against Republic of Ireland and Montenegro, but failed to make his debut.

== Statistics ==
Club	Season	League		Cup		Continental		Total	
Club	Season	Apps	Goals	Apps	Goals	Apps	Goals	Apps	Goals
Partizan	2004–05	0	0	0	0	0	0	0	0
Partizan	2005–06	5	0	0	0	0	0	5	0
Partizan	2006–07	12	0	1	0	1	0	14	0
Partizan	2007–08	0	0	0	0	0	0	0	0
Career total		17	0	1	0	1	0	19	0
