= Ivan Radovanović =

Serbian footballer and manager

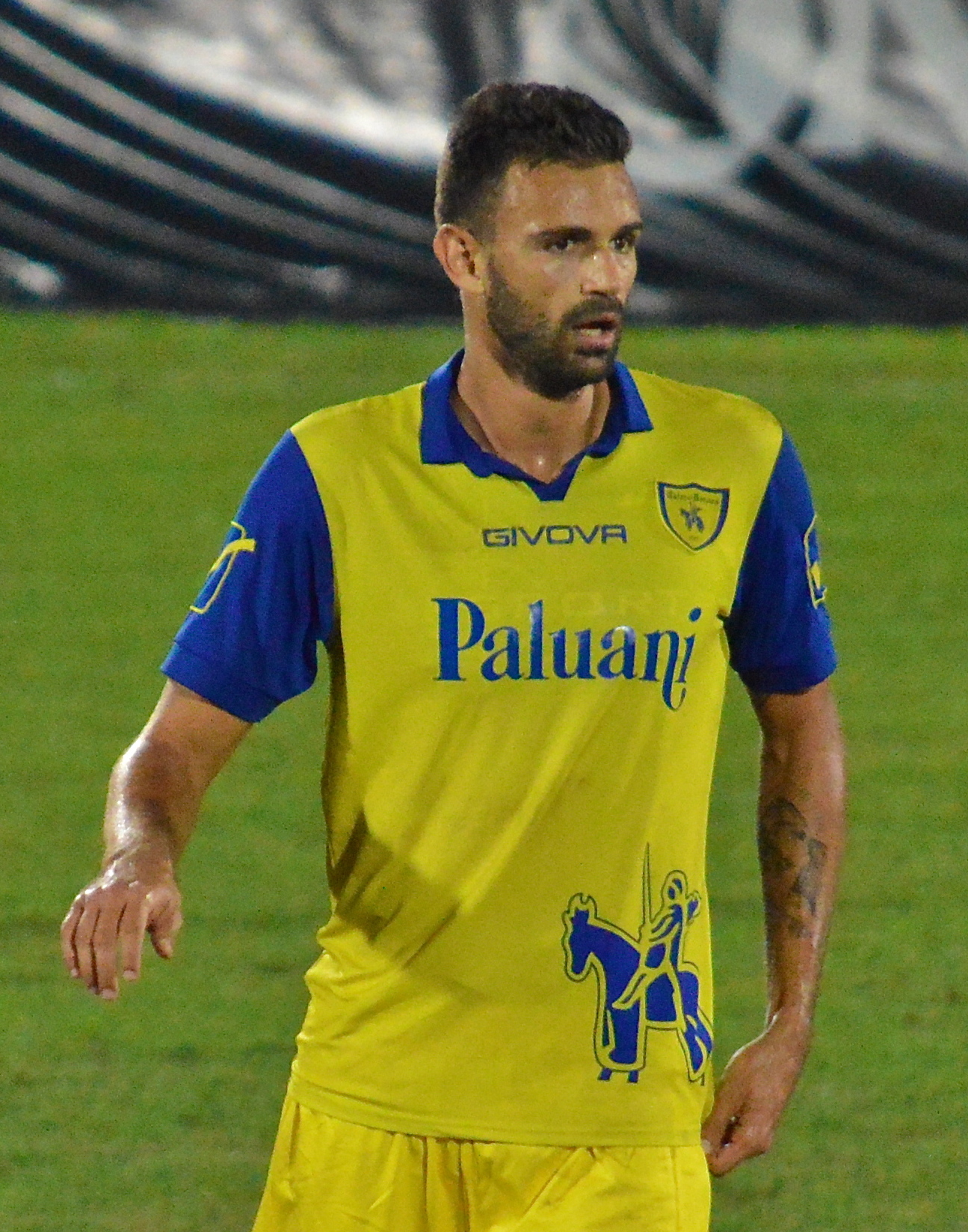
- Radovanović with Chievo in 2015

Personal information
- Date of birth: 29 August 1988 (age 38)
- Place of birth: Belgrade, SFR Yugoslavia
- Height: 1.87 m (6 ft 2 in)
- Position: Defensive midfielder

Youth career
- Obrenovac 1905
- 2001–2006: Partizan

Senior career*
| Years | Team | Apps | (Gls) |
| 2006–2008 | Partizan | 0 | (0) |
| 2007 | → Smederevo (loan) | 13 | (0) |
| 2008–2013 | Atalanta | 30 | (0) |
| 2008–2009 | → Pisa (loan) | 22 | (0) |
| 2010–2011 | → Bologna (loan) | 10 | (0) |
| 2011–2012 | → Novara (loan) | 28 | (1) |
| 2013–2019 | Chievo | 179 | (2) |
| 2019–2022 | Genoa | 68 | (0) |
| 2022–2023 | Salernitana | 24 | (1) |
| 2023 | Jedinstvo Ub | 20 | (0) |
| Total | | 394 | (4) |

International career
| 2007 | Serbia U19 (Note: Only official UEFA matches included) | 6 | (0) |
| 2007–2010 | Serbia U21 | 12 | (0) |
| 2010–2013 | Serbia | 10 | (0) |

Managerial career
- 2023–2024: Jedinstvo Ub
- * Club domestic league appearances and goals as of 26 December 2023

Ivan Radovanović (Serbian Cyrillic: Иван Радовановић; born 29 August 1988) is a Serbian professional football manager and former player.

At international level, Radovanović earned ten caps for Serbia between 2010 and 2013.

== Club career ==
After coming through the youth system at Partizan, Radovanović was promoted to the senior squad in the 2006–07 season, collecting two cup appearances in the process. He was subsequently loaned to fellow Serbian SuperLiga club Smederevo in the summer of 2007.

In January 2008, Radovanović was transferred to Italian club Atalanta. He failed to make his Serie A debut through the remainder of the 2007–08 season, being an unused sub in five games. While at Atalanta, Radovanović was also sent on loan to Pisa, Bologna, and Novara.

In July 2013, Radovanović switched to fellow Italian club Chievo. He appeared in more than 180 official games over the course of five and a half seasons. On 31 January 2019, Radovanović moved to Genoa.

On 31 January 2022, Radovanović signed with Salernitana until 2023. His contract with Salernitana was terminated by mutual consent on 8 February 2023.

== International career ==
Radovanović represented Serbia at the 2007 UEFA European Under-19 Championship in July 2007. He subsequently made his debuts for the under-21 side at the Valeriy Lobanovskyi Memorial Tournament in August 2007, where Serbia won silver medals.

On 17 November 2010, Radovanović made his full international debut for Serbia in a 1–0 away friendly win against Bulgaria, coming on as a half-time substitute for Radosav Petrović.

== Career statistics ==
=== Club ===
As of match played 22 May 2022

Appearances and goals by club, season and competition
| Club | Season | League | | | Cup | | Continental | | Total | |
| Club | Season | Division | Apps | Goals | Apps | Goals | Apps | Goals | Apps | Goals |
|---|---|---|---|---|---|---|---|---|---|---|
| Partizan | 2006–07 | Serbian SuperLiga | 0 | 0 | 2 | 0 | 0 | 0 | 2 | 0 |
| Smederevo (loan) | 2007–08 | Serbian SuperLiga | 13 | 0 | 0 | 0 | — | | 13 | 0 |
| Atalanta | 2007–08 | Serie A | 0 | 0 | 0 | 0 | — | | 0 | 0 |
| Atalanta | 2009–10 | Serie A | 12 | 0 | 1 | 0 | — | | 13 | 0 |
| Atalanta | 2010–11 | Serie B | 2 | 0 | 1 | 0 | — | | 3 | 0 |
| Atalanta | 2012–13 | Serie A | 16 | 0 | 1 | 0 | — | | 17 | 0 |
| Atalanta | Total | | 30 | 0 | 3 | 0 | — | | 33 | 0 |
| Pisa (loan) | 2008–09 | Serie B | 22 | 0 | 0 | 0 | — | | 22 | 0 |
| Bologna (loan) | 2010–11 | Serie A | 10 | 0 | 2 | 1 | — | | 12 | 1 |
| Novara (loan) | 2011–12 | Serie A | 28 | 1 | 2 | 1 | — | | 30 | 2 |
| Chievo | 2013–14 | Serie A | 33 | 0 | 2 | 1 | — | | 35 | 1 |
| Chievo | 2014–15 | Serie A | 31 | 1 | 0 | 0 | — | | 31 | 1 |
| Chievo | 2015–16 | Serie A | 26 | 0 | 1 | 0 | — | | 27 | 0 |
| Chievo | 2016–17 | Serie A | 35 | 0 | 2 | 0 | — | | 37 | 0 |
| Chievo | 2017–18 | Serie A | 35 | 1 | 1 | 0 | — | | 36 | 1 |
| Chievo | 2018–19 | Serie A | 19 | 0 | 1 | 0 | — | | 20 | 0 |
| Chievo | Total | | 179 | 2 | 7 | 1 | — | | 186 | 3 |
| Genoa | 2018–19 | Serie A | 16 | 0 | 0 | 0 | — | | 16 | 0 |
| Genoa | 2019–20 | Serie A | 19 | 0 | 3 | 0 | — | | 22 | 0 |
| Genoa | 2020–21 | Serie A | 33 | 0 | 2 | 0 | — | | 35 | 0 |
| Genoa | Total | | 68 | 0 | 5 | 0 | — | | 73 | 0 |
| Salernitana | 2021–22 | Serie A | 14 | 1 | 0 | 0 | — | | 14 | 1 |
| Career total | | | 364 | 4 | 21 | 3 | 0 | 0 | 385 | 7 |

=== International ===
Appearances and goals by national team and year
| National team | Year | Apps | Goals |
|---|---|---|---|
| Serbia | 2010 | 1 | 0 |
| Serbia | 2011 | 0 | 0 |
| Serbia | 2012 | 3 | 0 |
| Serbia | 2013 | 6 | 0 |
| Total | | 10 | 0 |

== Manager Statistics ==
As of match played 4 August 2024

Managerial record by team and tenure
| Team | Nat | From | To | Record | | | | | | | |
| Team | Nat | From | To | G | W | D | L | GF | GA | GD | Win % |
|---|---|---|---|---|---|---|---|---|---|---|---|
| Jedinstvo Ub | (Serbia) | 28 December 2023 | Present | 19 | 11 | 1 | 7 | 24 | 22 | +2 | 57.89 |
| Total | | | | 19 | 11 | 1 | 7 | 24 | 22 | +2 | 57.89 |
