= Srđan Radonjić =

Montenegrin footballer (born 1981)

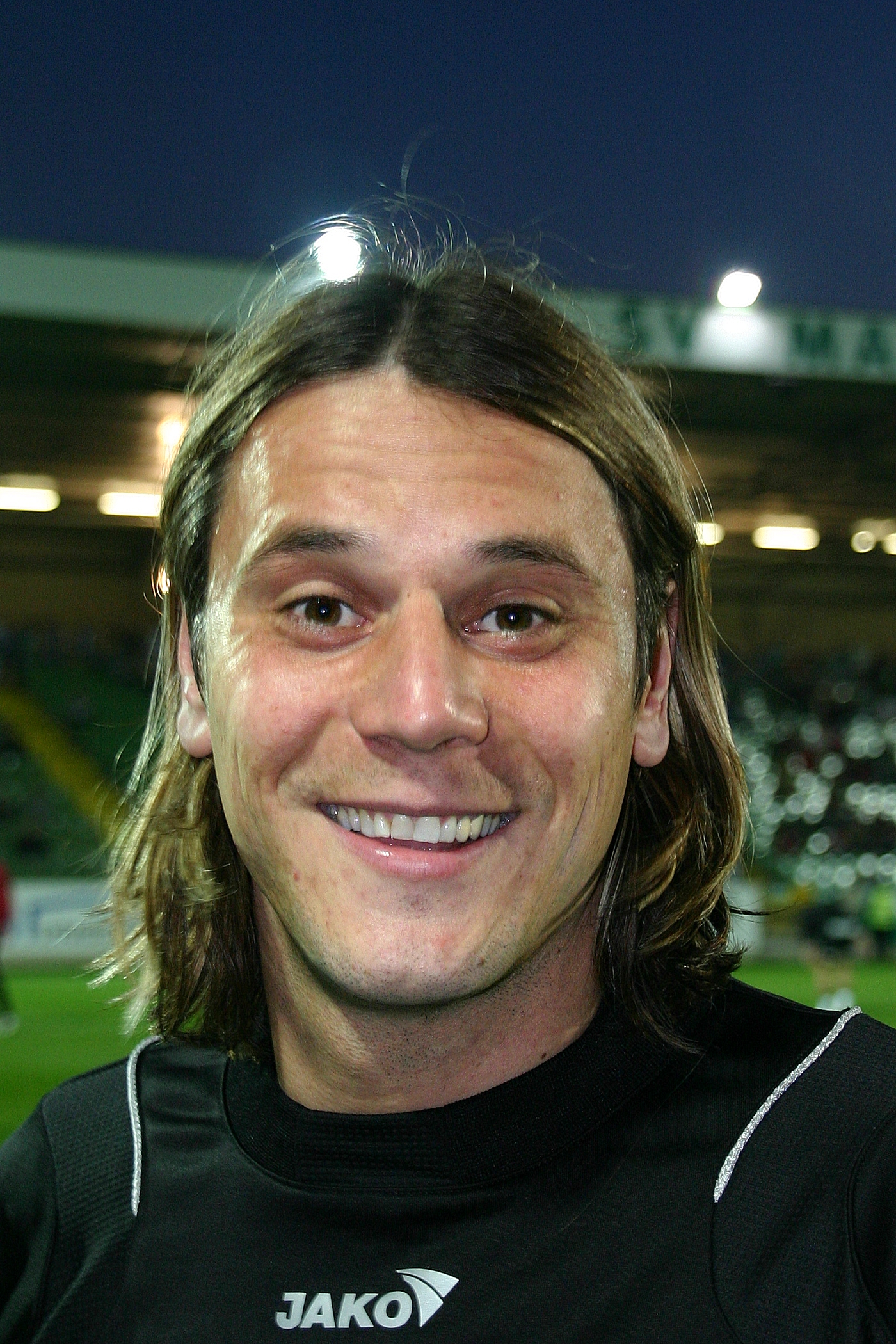
- Radonjić with Rheindorf Altach in 2009

Personal information
- Full name: Srđan Radonjić
- Date of birth: 8 May 1981 (age 45)
- Place of birth: Titograd, SFR Yugoslavia
- Height: 1.83 m (6 ft 0 in)
- Position: Striker

Senior career*
Years	Team	Apps	(Gls)
1999–2000	Budućnost Podgorica	14	(1)
2000–2002	Mornar	27	(19)
2002–2004	Sutjeska	52	(17)
2004–2007	Partizan	57	(33)
2007–2009	Odense	18	(4)
2007	→ Viborg (loan)	5	(1)
2008	→ Start (loan)	12	(5)
2009	→ Rheindorf Altach (loan)	12	(3)
2009	Mogren	15	(6)
2010	Luch Vladivostok	10	(0)
2011	Grbalj	13	(2)
2011–2012	Budućnost Podgorica	30	(14)
2012–2013	Kazma		
2013	Budućnost Podgorica	11	(3)
2013–2014	Sutjeska	31	(8)
Total		307	(116)

International career
2003	Serbia and Montenegro U21 (Note: Only official UEFA matches included)	2	(1)
2004	Serbia and Montenegro U23	2	(1)
2007	Montenegro	3	(0)
- * Club domestic league appearances and goals

Srđan Radonjić (Cyrillic: Срђан Радоњић; born 8 May 1981) is a Montenegrin former professional footballer who played as striker.

Radonjić represented Serbia and Montenegro at the 2004 Summer Olympics. He later played for the Montenegro, after the country declared its independence from the state union with Serbia.

== Club career ==
Radonjić moved to Partizan in January 2004, signing a four-year contract. He remained at the club for the next three years, until January 2007. In the national championship, Radonjić scored a total of 33 goals in 57 appearances, also becoming the league's top scorer in the 2005–06 season with 20 goals.

== International career ==
Radonjić was a member of the Serbia and Montenegro under-23 team at the 2004 Summer Olympics, which finished fourth in Group C, behind eventual gold medal winners Argentina, Australia and Tunisia.

Radonjić represented and made his debut for Montenegro at the 2007 Kirin Cup in Japan, appearing in matches against the hosts and Colombia. He has earned a total of 3 caps, scoring no goals. His final international was an August 2007 friendly match against Slovenia in Podgorica.

== Statistics ==
Club	Season	League		Cup		Continental		Total	
Club	Season	Apps	Goals	Apps	Goals	Apps	Goals	Apps	Goals
Partizan	2003–04	11	3	1	1	0	0	12	4
Partizan	2004–05	17	10	3	2	1	1	21	13
Partizan	2005–06	28	20	2	0	3	3	33	23
Partizan	2006–07	1	0	0	0	1	0	2	0
Partizan	Total	57	33	6	3	5	4	68	40

== Honours ==
=== Club ===
Partizan

- First League of Serbia and Montenegro: 2004–05

Budućnost Podgorica

- Montenegrin First League: 2011–12
- Montenegrin Cup: 2012–13

Sutjeska Nikšić

- Montenegrin First League: 2013–14

=== Individual ===
- First League of Serbia and Montenegro Top Scorer: 2005–06
