= Obiora Odita =

Nigerian footballer

Personal information
- Full name: Obiorah Emmanuel Odita
- Date of birth: 14 May 1983 (age 43)
- Place of birth: Enugu, Nigeria
- Height: 1.85 m (6 ft 1 in)
- Position: Forward

Youth career
- Enugu Rangers

Senior career*
Years	Team	Apps	(Gls)
2002–2003	Udoji United		
2003–2005	Javor Ivanjica	43	(16)
2005–2007	Partizan	48	(16)
2006	→ Javor Ivanjica (loan)	12	(5)
2007–2009	Al Ain	0	(0)
2008	→ Westerlo (loan)	9	(2)
2009–2010	Westerlo	28	(3)
2010–2011	Javor Ivanjica	15	(2)
2011	Tianjin TEDA	8	(1)
2011–2012	Javor Ivanjica	23	(9)
2012–2013	Taraz	42	(11)
2014–2016	Voždovac	53	(11)
2016–2021	Mladost Lučani	142	(10)
2021–2022	Javor Ivanjica	34	(7)
2022	Železničar Pančevo	4	(0)
2023	FAP	14	(7)
2023–2024	Srbija Ulm	3	(1)
2024–2025	Tempo Frankfurt	32	(9)
- * Club domestic league appearances and goals as of 10 March 2026

Obiorah Emmanuel Odita (born 14 May 1983) is a Nigerian professional footballer who plays as a forward. He also holds Serbian citizenship.

== Career ==
=== Early years ===
Born in Enugu, Odita started out at his local club Rangers, before switching to Udoji United. He was acquired by First League of FR Yugoslavia side Javor Ivanjica during the 2003 winter transfer window. Until the end of the 2002–03 season, Odita scored one goal in nine league appearances, as the club suffered relegation to the Second League. He led them in scoring in the first half of the 2004–05 Second League of Serbia and Montenegro with 10 goals, attracting attention from bigger teams.

=== Partizan ===
In January 2005, Odita was officially transferred to Partizan, signing a four-year deal. He marked his competitive debut by scoring both of his team's goals in a 2–2 home draw with Dnipro Dnipropetrovsk in the first leg of the UEFA Cup round of 32, as the club went on to win the tie after a 1–0 away win in the return leg. With five league goals in the remainder of the 2004–05 season, Odita helped the side win the championship title with an unbeaten record. He opened the 2005–06 season by netting both goals in two 1–0 wins over Moldovan champions Sheriff Tiraspol in the UEFA Champions League second qualifying round. In January 2006, Odita was sent back to Javor Ivanjica on a six-month loan. He subsequently returned to Partizan for the 2006–07 season, forming an attacking partnership with Stevan Jovetić and becoming their joint top scorer in the league with 10 goals. In June 2007, Odita moved to the United Arab Emirates and signed a two-year contract with Al Ain.

=== Westerlo ===
In January 2008, Odita was loaned to Belgian club Westerlo. He scored twice in the second half of the 2007–08 season, before returning to Al Ain. In January 2009, Odita moved back to Belgium and signed a permanent contract with Westerlo.

=== Later years ===
In July 2010, Odita returned to Serbia by rejoining his former club Javor Ivanjica for the 2010–11 season. He later moved to China and signed with Tianjin TEDA in early 2011. Following a brief stint in Asia, Odita made another return to Javor Ivanjica ahead of the 2011–12 season.

In the summer of 2012, Odita moved to Kazakhstan and signed with Taraz, netting six times in the remainder of the 2012 Kazakhstan Premier League. He subsequently finished as the team's top scorer in the 2013 campaign with five goals. In September 2014, Odita returned to Serbia once again and joined Voždovac.

After spending two seasons with Voždovac, Odita switched to fellow Serbian SuperLiga side Mladost Lučani in June 2016. He spent five seasons with club, amassing 142 appearances and scoring 10 goals in the top flight. In June 2021, Odita rejoined Javor Ivanjica once more.

== Career statistics ==
Appearances and goals by club, season and competition
Club	Season	League			Cup		Continental		Total	
Club	Season	Division	Apps	Goals	Apps	Goals	Apps	Goals	Apps	Goals
Javor Ivanjica	2002–03	First League of Serbia and Montenegro	9	1	0	0	—		9	1
Javor Ivanjica	2003–04	Second League of Serbia and Montenegro	16	5	0	0	—		16	5
Javor Ivanjica	2004–05	Second League of Serbia and Montenegro	18	10	1	0	—		19	10
Javor Ivanjica	Total		43	16	1	0	—		44	16
Partizan	2004–05	First League of Serbia and Montenegro	12	5	1	0	4	2	17	7
Partizan	2005–06	First League of Serbia and Montenegro	13	1	2	1	6	2	21	4
Partizan	2006–07	Serbian SuperLiga	23	10	1	0	6	2	30	12
Partizan	Total		48	16	4	1	16	6	68	23
Javor Ivanjica (loan)	2005–06	First League of Serbia and Montenegro	12	5	0	0	—		12	5
Al Ain	2007–08	UAE Football League	0	0	0	0	—		0	0
Al Ain	2008–09	UAE Football League	0	0	0	0	—		0	0
Al Ain	Total		0	0	0	0	—		0	0
Westerlo (loan)	2007–08	Belgian First Division	9	2	0	0	—		9	2
Westerlo	2008–09	Belgian First Division	14	3	0	0	—		14	3
Westerlo	2009–10	Belgian First Division	14	0	1	1	—		15	1
Westerlo	Total		28	3	1	1	—		29	4
Javor Ivanjica	2010–11	Serbian SuperLiga	15	2	1	1	—		16	3
Tianjin TEDA	2011	Chinese Super League	8	1	0	0	6	0	14	1
Javor Ivanjica	2011–12	Serbian SuperLiga	23	9	2	1	—		25	10
Taraz	2012	Kazakhstan Premier League	12	6	0	0	—		12	6
Taraz	2013	Kazakhstan Premier League	30	5	4	0	—		34	5
Taraz	Total		42	11	4	0	—		46	11
Voždovac	2014–15	Serbian SuperLiga	21	5	3	0	—		24	5
Voždovac	2015–16	Serbian SuperLiga	32	6	1	0	—		33	6
Voždovac	Total		53	11	4	0	—		57	11
Mladost Lučani	2016–17	Serbian SuperLiga	30	4	1	0	—		31	4
Mladost Lučani	2017–18	Serbian SuperLiga	28	0	1	0	1	0	30	0
Mladost Lučani	2018–19	Serbian SuperLiga	25	3	2	0	—		27	3
Mladost Lučani	2019–20	Serbian SuperLiga	24	1	2	1	—		26	2
Mladost Lučani	2020–21	Serbian SuperLiga	35	2	1	1	—		36	3
Mladost Lučani	Total		142	10	7	2	1	0	150	12
Javor Ivanjica	2021–22	Serbian First League	34	7	2	1	—		36	8
Železničar Pančevo	2022–23	Serbian First League	4	0	0	0	—		4	0
FAP	2022–23	Serbian League West	14	7	—		—		14	7
Srbija Ulm	2023–24	Landesliga Württemberg	3	1	—		—		3	1
Tempo Frankfurt	2024–25	Gruppenliga	24	7	—		—		24	7
Tempo Frankfurt	2025–26	Gruppenliga	8	2	—		—		8	2
Tempo Frankfurt	Total		32	9	—		—		32	9
Career total			510	110	26	7	23	6	559	123

== Honours ==
Partizan

- First League of Serbia and Montenegro: 2004–05

Mladost Lučani

- Serbian Cup runner-up: 2017–18
