= Milivoje Ćirković =

Serbian footballer

Jakov Ćirković
Personal information
- Full name: Milivoje Ćirković
- Date of birth: 14 April 1977 (age 49)
- Place of birth: Nova Pazova, SR Serbia, SFR Yugoslavia
- Height: 1.85 m (6 ft 1 in)
- Position: Right-back

Youth career
- Partizan

Senior career*
Years	Team	Apps	(Gls)
1994–1996	Radnički Nova Pazova	20	(1)
1996–2010	Partizan	104	(2)
1996–1997	→ Budućnost Valjevo (loan)	22	(0)
1997–1998	→ Milicionar (loan)	42	(2)
1999	→ Teleoptik (loan)	31	(3)
Total		219	(8)

International career
2000–2005	FR Yugoslavia / Serbia and Montenegro	9	(0)
2001	FR Yugoslavia XI	3	(0)
- * Club domestic league appearances and goals

Milivoje Ćirković (Serbian Cyrillic: Миливоје Ћирковић; born 14 April 1977) is a Serbian retired footballer who played as a defender.

== Club career ==
After returning from his loan at Milicionar, Ćirković played his first official game for Partizan in November 1999. He became a first-team regular in the 2000–01 season, making a career-high 34 appearances across all competitions.

In the 2001–02 and 2002–03 seasons, Ćirković helped Partizan win back-to-back championship titles. He was subsequently a member of the team that reached the group stage of the 2003–04 UEFA Champions League, converting the decisive penalty in the shoot-out against Newcastle United in the final qualifying round.

In January 2006, Ćirković extended his contract with Partizan for another four years. He was deemed surplus to requirements after failing to make any appearances in the 2007–08 season.

== International career ==
At international level, Ćirković was capped 12 times (3 unofficial) for Serbia and Montenegro (previously known as FR Yugoslavia). He made his international debut in November 2000, coming on as a substitute for Nenad Sakić in a 2–1 away friendly loss to Romania.

In January 2001, Ćirković represented his country at the Millennium Super Soccer Cup, as the team would go on to win the unofficial tournament. His final international was a February 2005 friendly match away against Bulgaria.

== Career statistics ==
=== Club ===
Club	Season	League		Cup		Continental		Total	
Club	Season	Apps	Goals	Apps	Goals	Apps	Goals	Apps	Goals
Partizan	1999–2000	12	0	1	0	0	0	13	0
Partizan	2000–01	27	1	3	0	4	0	34	1
Partizan	2001–02	12	0	1	0	4	0	17	0
Partizan	2002–03	16	0	1	0	5	0	22	0
Partizan	2003–04	14	1	1	0	8	0	23	1
Partizan	2004–05	9	0	0	0	6	0	15	0
Partizan	2005–06	9	0	0	0	2	0	11	0
Partizan	2006–07	5	0	0	0	2	0	7	0
Partizan	2007–08	0	0	0	0	0	0	0	0
Partizan	Total	104	2	7	0	31	0	142	2

=== International ===
National team	Year	Apps	Goals
FR Yugoslavia	2000	2	0
FR Yugoslavia	2001	2	0
FR Yugoslavia	2002	0	0
Serbia and Montenegro	2003	3	0
Serbia and Montenegro	2004	1	0
Serbia and Montenegro	2005	1	0
Total		9	0

== Honours ==
Partizan

- First League of Serbia and Montenegro: 2001–02, 2002–03, 2004–05
- FR Yugoslavia Cup: 2000–01
