= Nebojša Marinković =

Serbian footballer (born in 1986)

Nebojša Marinković Небојша Маринковић
Personal information
- Full name: Nebojša Marinković
- Date of birth: 19 June 1986 (age 40)
- Place of birth: Knjaževac, SFR Yugoslavia
- Height: 1.77 m (5 ft 10 in)
- Position: Attacking midfielder

Youth career
- Timočanin
- 2000–2003: Partizan

Senior career*
Years	Team	Apps	(Gls)
2003–2008	Partizan	34	(13)
2003–2004	→ Teleoptik (loan)	31	(6)
2005	→ Obilić (loan)	12	(1)
2005	→ Teleoptik (loan)	13	(10)
2006	→ Voždovac (loan)	13	(6)
2006	→ Teleoptik (loan)	1	(0)
2007	→ Iraklis (loan)	7	(0)
2008	→ Djurgården (loan)	3	(0)
2008–2009	Čukarički	14	(0)
2009	→ Gimnàstic (loan)	10	(0)
2009	Teleoptik	10	(5)
2010–2011	Maccabi Petah Tikva	31	(6)
2011–2013	Hapoel Acre	56	(12)
2013	Hapoel Haifa	12	(2)
2014–2017	Perth Glory	80	(15)
2017	Rad	5	(0)
2018	Sarawak FA	7	(0)
2018	Nakhon Ratchasima	6	(0)
Total		345	(76)

International career
2002–2003	Serbia and Montenegro U17 (Note: Only official UEFA matches included)	6	(2)
2003–2005	Serbia and Montenegro U19	11	(4)
2007	Serbia U21	3	(2)
- * Club domestic league appearances and goals as of 5 May 2019

Nebojša Marinković (Serbian Cyrillic: Небојша Маринковић; born 19 June 1986) is a Serbian professional footballer who plays as an attacking midfielder.

He is the older brother of fellow footballer Nenad Marinković.

== Club career ==
=== Early years ===
Born in Knjaževac, Marinković made his first football steps in his hometown club Timočanin. He joined the youth system of Partizan in 2000, becoming a member of their promising generation, together with Borko Veselinović, Milan Smiljanić and Stefan Babović, that won numerous youth tournaments.

=== Partizan ===
After already playing for Partizan's affiliated club Teleoptik, Marinković made his official debut for the Crno-beli in the second part of the 2003–04 season under manager Vladimir Vermezović. He signed his first professional contract for Partizan in June 2004, on a five-year deal. However, Marinković failed to make any appearances for the club in the first part of the 2004–05 season, before being loaned to Obilić. He subsequently returned to Partizan and got some playing time in the first part of the 2005–06 season, scoring four goals in seven competitive appearances. However, Marinković was eventually sent on loan to Voždovac in January 2006. He scored six goals in 13 league appearances for Voždovac, as they finished in third place. After returning to Partizan from a successful loan spell, Marinković became a regular member of the starting eleven, finishing the 2006–07 season as the team's top scorer with 14 goals in all competitions.

=== Israel ===
In the 2010 winter transfer window, Marinković moved to Israel and signed with Maccabi Petah Tikva. He spent the following four years in the country, also playing for Hapoel Acre and Hapoel Haifa. During that period, Marinković made a total of 99 league appearances and scored 20 goals for these three clubs combined.

=== Perth Glory ===
On 20 January 2014, Marinković signed with Perth Glory until the end of the 2014–15 season. He scored his first goal for the club on 30 March 2014, equalizing the score in an eventual 2–1 win over Newcastle Jets. On 14 May 2017, Marinković was released by The Glory.

=== Later years ===
In October 2017, Marinković joined Rad on a one-year deal. He left the club after just five games.

In early 2018, Marinković moved to Malaysia and joined Sarawak FA.

== International career ==
Marinković was capped for his country at all youth levels from under-17 to under-21. He represented Serbia and Montenegro at the 2005 UEFA Under-19 Championship, as the team reached the semi-finals of the tournament. Marinković appeared in all four of Serbia and Montenegro's games and scored two goals in the process.

== Statistics ==
Club	Season	League		Cup		Continental		Total	
Club	Season	Apps	Goals	Apps	Goals	Apps	Goals	Apps	Goals
Partizan	2003–04	1	0	0	0	0	0	1	0
Partizan	2004–05	0	0	0	0	0	0	0	0
Partizan	2005–06	5	3	1	1	1	0	7	4
Partizan	2006–07	28	10	3	1	6	3	37	14
Partizan	2007–08	0	0	0	0	2	0	2	0
Partizan	Total	34	13	4	2	9	3	47	18
Perth Glory	2013–14	12	1	—		—		12	1
Perth Glory	2014–15	25	5	5	5	—		30	10
Perth Glory	2015–16	20	3	5	2	—		25	5
Perth Glory	2016–17	23	6	2	0	—		25	6
Perth Glory	Total	80	15	12	7	—		92	22
