= Jovan Stefanović =

Serbian footballer

Personal information
- Full name: Jovan Stefanović
- Date of birth: 5 February 1984 (age 42)
- Place of birth: SFR Yugoslavia
- Height: 1.74 m (5 ft 9 in)
- Position: Midfielder

Youth career
- Partizan

Senior career*
Years	Team	Apps	(Gls)
–2006	Obilić		
2007	BASK		
2007	Metalac Gornji Milanovac	10	(1)
2008	Hajduk Beograd	14	(2)
2009	Metalurg Skopje	9	(2)
2010	Pelister	7	(1)
2011	Radnički Kragujevac	0	(0)
2011-2012	Pobeda Beloševac		
2012-2013	IMT		
2013-2014	Budućnost Krušik-Valjevo		
- * Club domestic league appearances and goals

Jovan Stefanović (Serbian Cyrillic: Јован Стефановић; born 5 February 1984) is a Serbian retired footballer who played as a midfielder.
