= Mladen Lazarević =

Serbian footballer

Personal information
- Full name: Mladen Lazarević
- Date of birth: 16 January 1984 (age 42)
- Place of birth: Sremska Mitrovica, SFR Yugoslavia
- Height: 1.86 m (6 ft 1 in)
- Position: Centre back

Youth career
- Zemun

Senior career*
Years	Team	Apps	(Gls)
2003–2006	Zemun	72	(2)
2006–2008	Partizan	9	(0)
2009	Roeselare	13	(1)
2009–2011	Kortrijk	14	(0)
2011	Gostaresh Foulad		
2012–2013	Sloboda Užice	11	(0)
2013	Novi Pazar	10	(1)
2014	Ordabasy	0	(0)
2015	Spartak Subotica	4	(1)
2015	Napredak Kruševac	8	(0)
2016–2019	Mačva Šabac	68	(14)
2019–2020	Železničar Pančevo		
2020	BASK		
2021	Mihajlovac		
2022–2023	Kaluđerica 1969		

International career
2002–2003	Serbia and Montenegro U19 (Note: Only official UEFA matches included)	5	(0)
2004–2005	Serbia and Montenegro U21	2	(0)
- * Club domestic league appearances and goals

Mladen Lazarević (Serbian Cyrillic: Младен Лазаревић; born 16 January 1984) is a Serbian retired footballer who played as a defender.

== Career ==
Lazarević made his senior debut with Zemun in 2003. He spent three seasons with the Gornjovarošani, before transferring to Partizan in June 2006.

Lazarević joined Železničar Pančevo ahead of the 2019–20 season.
