= Lukićevo =

Lukićevo Лукићево
- Village (Selo)
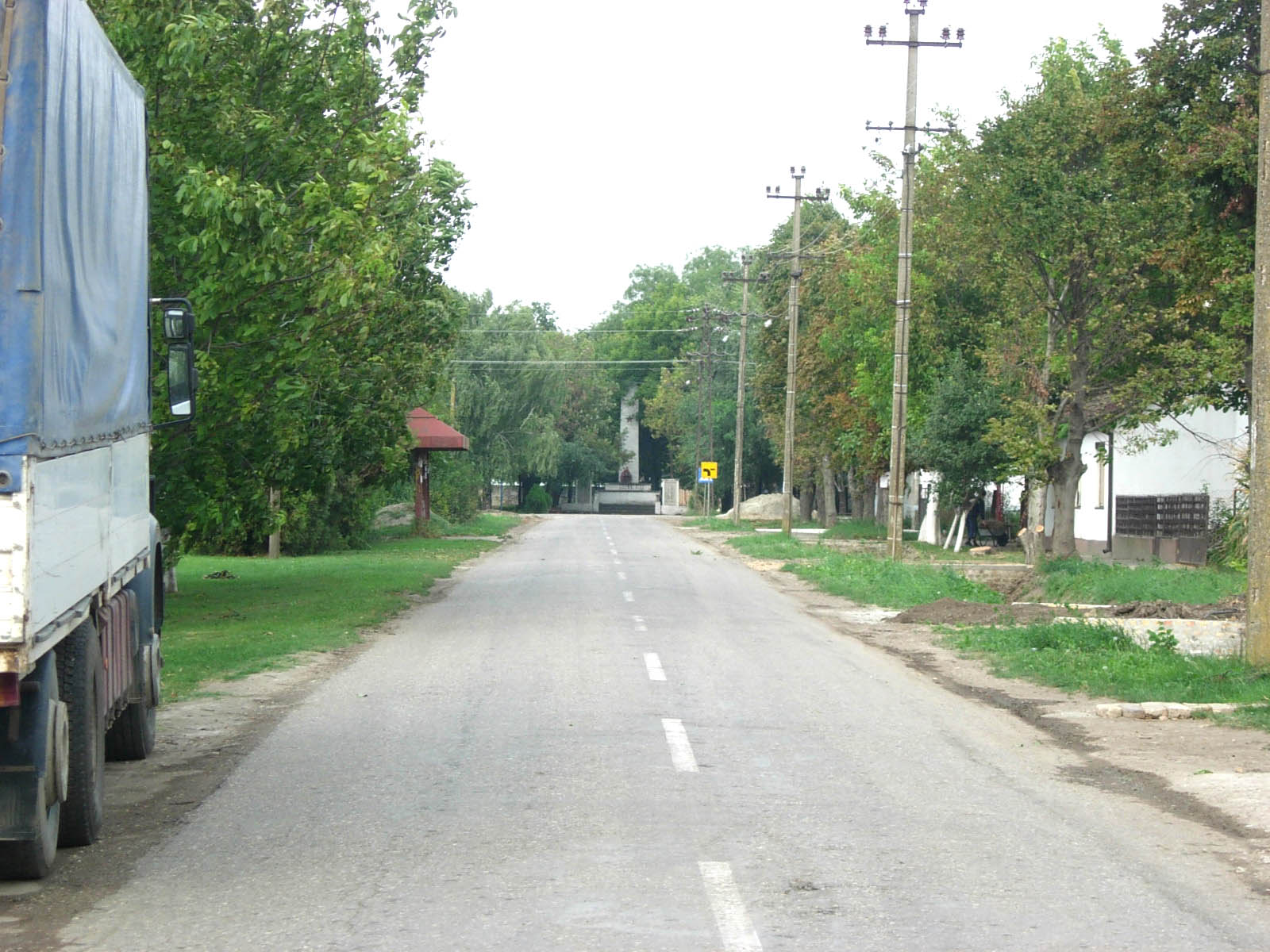
- The main street

- Location within Serbia Lukićevo (Serbia) Lukićevo (Europe)
- Coordinates: 45°20′11″N 20°29′34″E
- Country: Serbia
- Province: Vojvodina
- District: Central Banat
- Municipalities: Zrenjanin
- Elevation: 70 m (230 ft)

Population (2022)
  - Lukićevo: 1,409
- Time zone: UTC+1 (CET)
  - Summer (DST): UTC+2 (CEST)
- Postal code: 23261
- Area code: +381(0)23
- Car plates: ZR

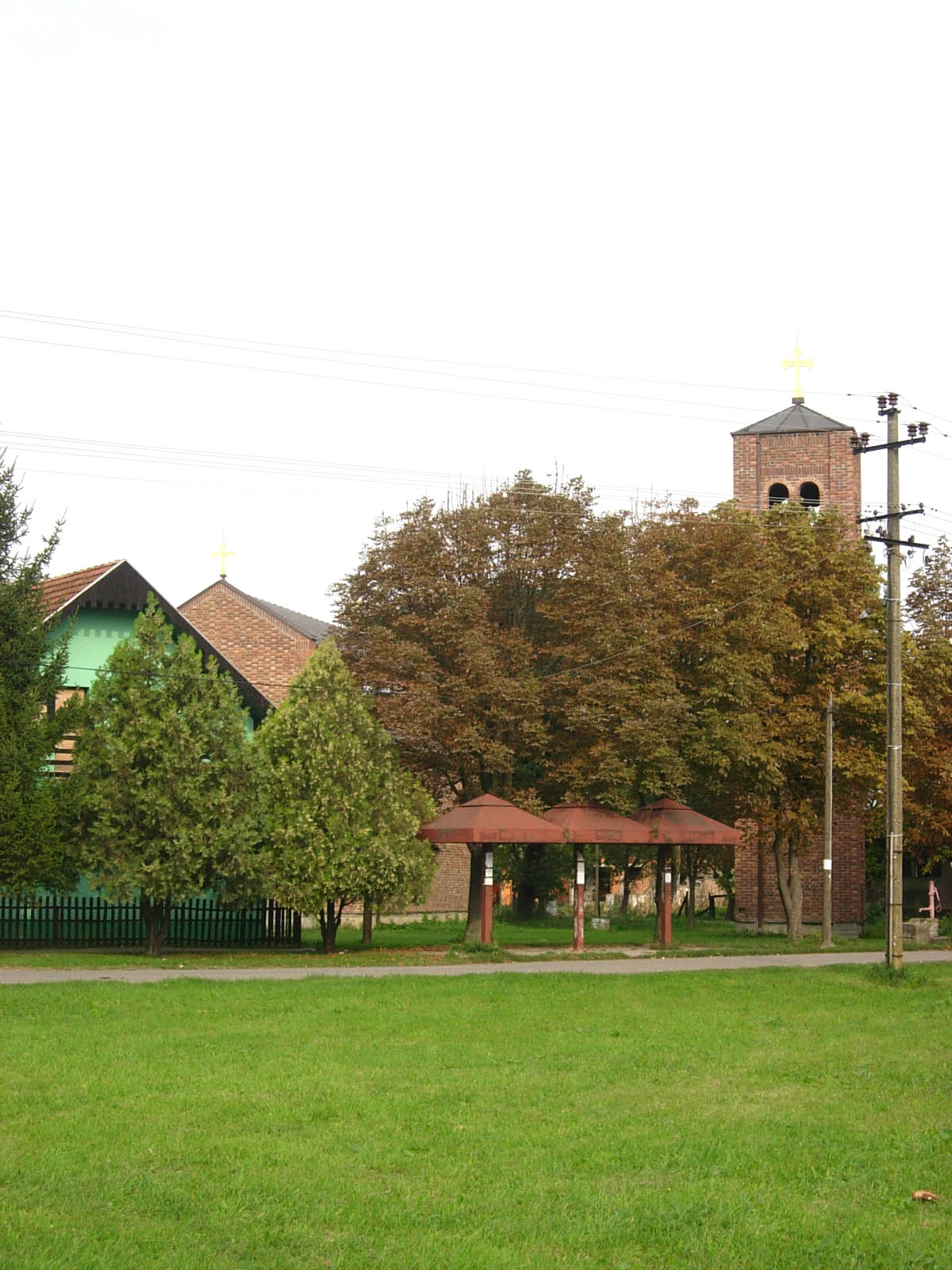
The new Orthodox church.

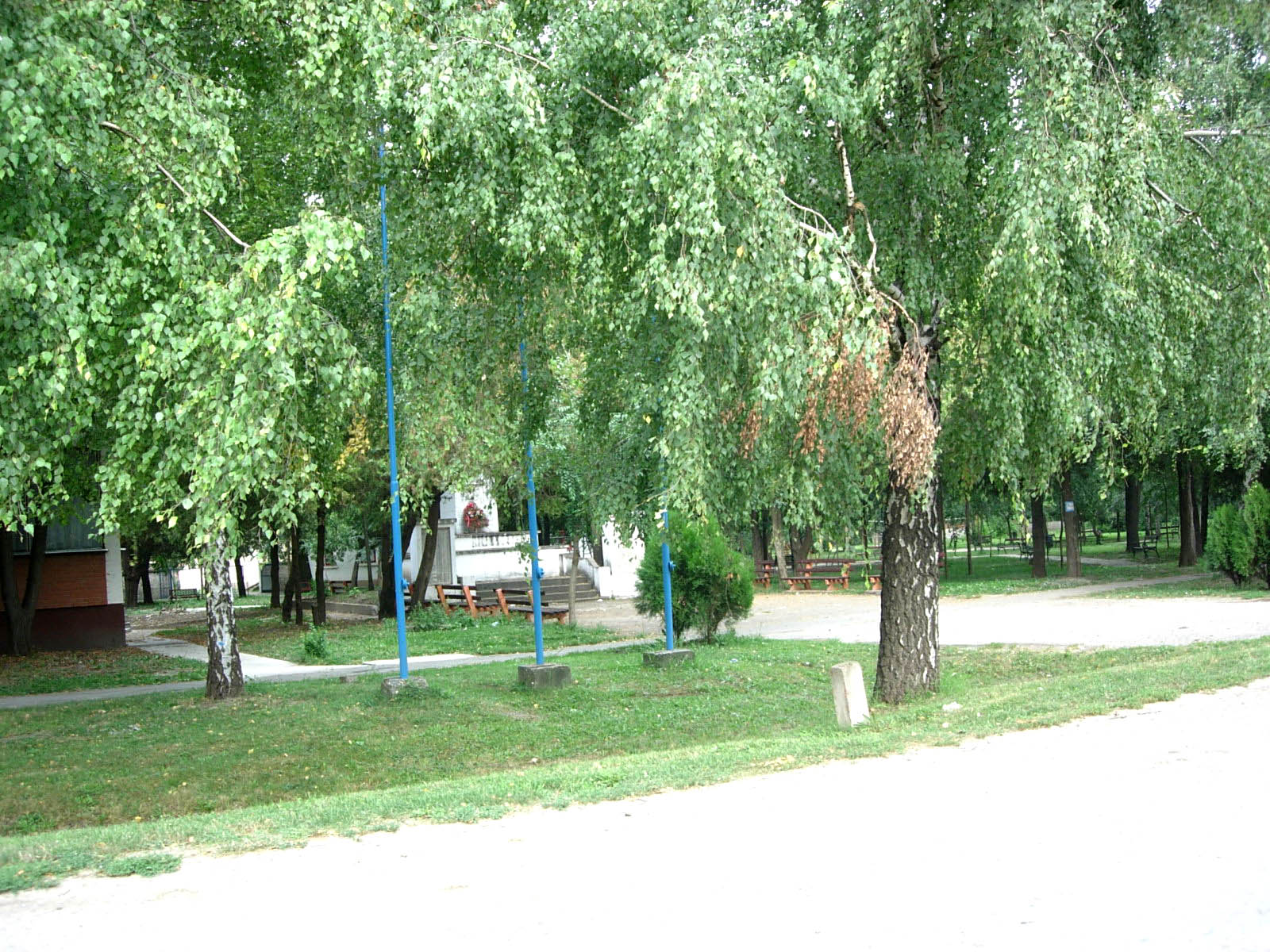
Monument in the village.

Lukićevo (Serbian Cyrillic: Лукићево; Hungarian: Zsigmondfalva) is a village in Serbia. It is located in the Zrenjanin municipality, in the Central Banat District, Vojvodina province. The village has a Serb ethnic majority (93.45%) and its population numbering 1,409 people (2022 census).

== Name ==
Formerly, the village was known in Serbian as Martinica (Мартиница). Village is also known by names in other languages: German: Sigmundfeld or Sigmundsdorf, Hungarian: Zsigmondfalva.

== Historical population ==
- 1961: 1,930
- 1971: 2,091
- 1981: 2,186
- 1991: 2,196
- 2002: 2,077
- 2011: 1,804

== See also ==
- List of places in Serbia
- List of cities, towns and villages in Vojvodina
