= Zoran Vujović (footballer, born 1986) =

Serbian footballer

Personal information
- Full name: Zoran Vujović
- Date of birth: 25 February 1986 (age 40)
- Place of birth: Kragujevac, SFR Yugoslavia
- Height: 1.87 m (6 ft 2 in)
- Position: Forward

Youth career
- Partizan

Senior career*
Years	Team	Apps	(Gls)
2004–2006	Partizan	0	(0)
2006–2007	→ Teleoptik (loan)	49	(7)
2007–2008	Metalac GM	30	(5)
2008–2011	Banat Zrenjanin	49	(6)
2011–2012	Teleoptik	17	(2)
2012	Tatabánya	11	(0)
2013	Novi Pazar	12	(0)
2013–2014	Metalurg Skopje	21	(5)
2014–2015	Agrotikos Asteras	1	(0)
2015–2016	Vendsyssel	2	(0)
2016	Dinamo Vranje	11	(2)
2017	Fjarðabyggðar	22	(8)
2018	Valdres	13	(4)
2019–2020	B68 Toftir	9	(1)
2020–2022	07 Vestur	17	(4)
Total		264	(44)
- * Club domestic league appearances and goals as of 17:47, 19 July 2021 (UTC)

Zoran Vujović (Serbian Cyrillic: Зоран Вујовић; born 25 February 1986) is a Serbian retired footballer who last played as a forward for 07 Vestur.

== Career ==
Zoran Vujović Born in Kragujevac, began his career in his native Serbia playing for young team FK Partizan. In 2012 he moved to FC Tatabánya and played in Hungarian NB II. 2013 January, he moved to FK Novi Pazar to play in Serbian SuperLiga.

Vujovic left Vendsyssel FF on 1 January 2016. He joined 07 Vestur from fellow Faroese side B68 Toftir in 2020.
