= Perica Stančeski =

Footballer

Personal information
- Full name: Perica Stančeski
- Date of birth: 29 January 1985 (age 41)
- Place of birth: Belgrade, SFR Yugoslavia
- Height: 1.82 m (6 ft 0 in)
- Position: Midfielder

Youth career
- Partizan

Senior career*
Years	Team	Apps	(Gls)
2003–2008	Partizan	1	(0)
2003–2004	→ Hajduk Beograd (loan)	14	(1)
2004–2006	→ Teleoptik (loan)	48	(0)
2006–2008	→ Bežanija (loan)	35	(0)
2008–2009	Čukarički	22	(0)
2009–2010	Borac Banja Luka	29	(1)
2011	Željezničar Sarajevo	14	(1)
2012	BSK Borča	6	(0)
2013	Zvijezda Gradačac	12	(1)
2014	Rad	4	(0)
2015	Dordoi Bishkek	0	(0)
2015	Orašje	14	(1)
2015	Metalurg Skopje	6	(0)
2016	Mačva Šabac	1	(0)
2017	Lokomotiva Beograd		
Total		206	(5)

International career
2002	FR Yugoslavia U17 (Note: Only official UEFA matches included)	7	(2)
2003	Serbia and Montenegro U19	3	(0)
2006	Macedonia U21	2	(0)
2010	Macedonia	1	(0)
- * Club domestic league appearances and goals

Perica Stančeski (Macedonian: Перица Станчески; born 29 January 1985) is a Macedonian former professional footballer who played as a midfielder.

== Club career ==
After coming through the youth system at Partizan, Stančeski was sent out on loan to Hajduk Beograd in 2003. He later also played on loan for Teleoptik in the Serbian League Belgrade and Bežanija in the Serbian SuperLiga. His only appearance for Partizan came in the 2005–06 season.

In July 2008, Stančeski signed a three-year contract with Čukarički. He left the club after just one season. In October 2009, Stančeski joined the Bosnian side Borac Banja Luka. He spent a little over a year there before being released.

In January 2015, Stančeski moved to Kyrgyzstan and signed with Dordoi Bishkek. However, he left the club without making an appearance.

== International career ==
Stančeski represented Serbia and Montenegro at under-17 (as FR Yugoslavia) and under-19 levels. He took part in the 2002 UEFA European Under-17 Championship, helping his team reach the quarter-finals.

In 2006, Stančeski switched allegiance to Macedonia, making his debut for the under-21 team in September of the same year. He won his only senior cap for Macedonia on 22 December 2010, playing in a 1–0 away friendly loss to China.
