= Vladimir Vukajlović =

Serbian footballer (born 1983)

Personal information
- Full name: Vladimir Vukajlović
- Date of birth: 25 August 1983 (age 43)
- Place of birth: Čačak, SFR Yugoslavia
- Height: 1.80 m (5 ft 11 in)
- Position: Midfielder

Youth career
- Borac Čačak

Senior career*
Years	Team	Apps	(Gls)
2001–2005	Borac Čačak	81	(10)
2005–2007	Partizan	0	(0)
2006	→ Rad (loan)	10	(0)
2006	→ Teleoptik (loan)	2	(0)
2007	→ Bežanija (loan)	12	(3)
2007	Bežanija	10	(2)
2008–2009	Vojvodina	28	(2)
2009	Senica	1	(0)
2010	Sloboda Užice	3	(0)
2011	Diagoras	5	(0)
2012	Aktobe	11	(0)
2014	Borac Čačak	2	(0)
Total		165	(17)

International career
2004	Serbia and Montenegro U21	2	(0)
- * Club domestic league appearances and goals

Vladimir Vukajlović (Serbian Cyrillic: Владимир Вукајловић; born 25 August 1983) is a Serbian retired footballer who played as a midfielder.
