= Nenad Marinković =

Serbian footballer

Nenad Marinković Ненад Маринковић
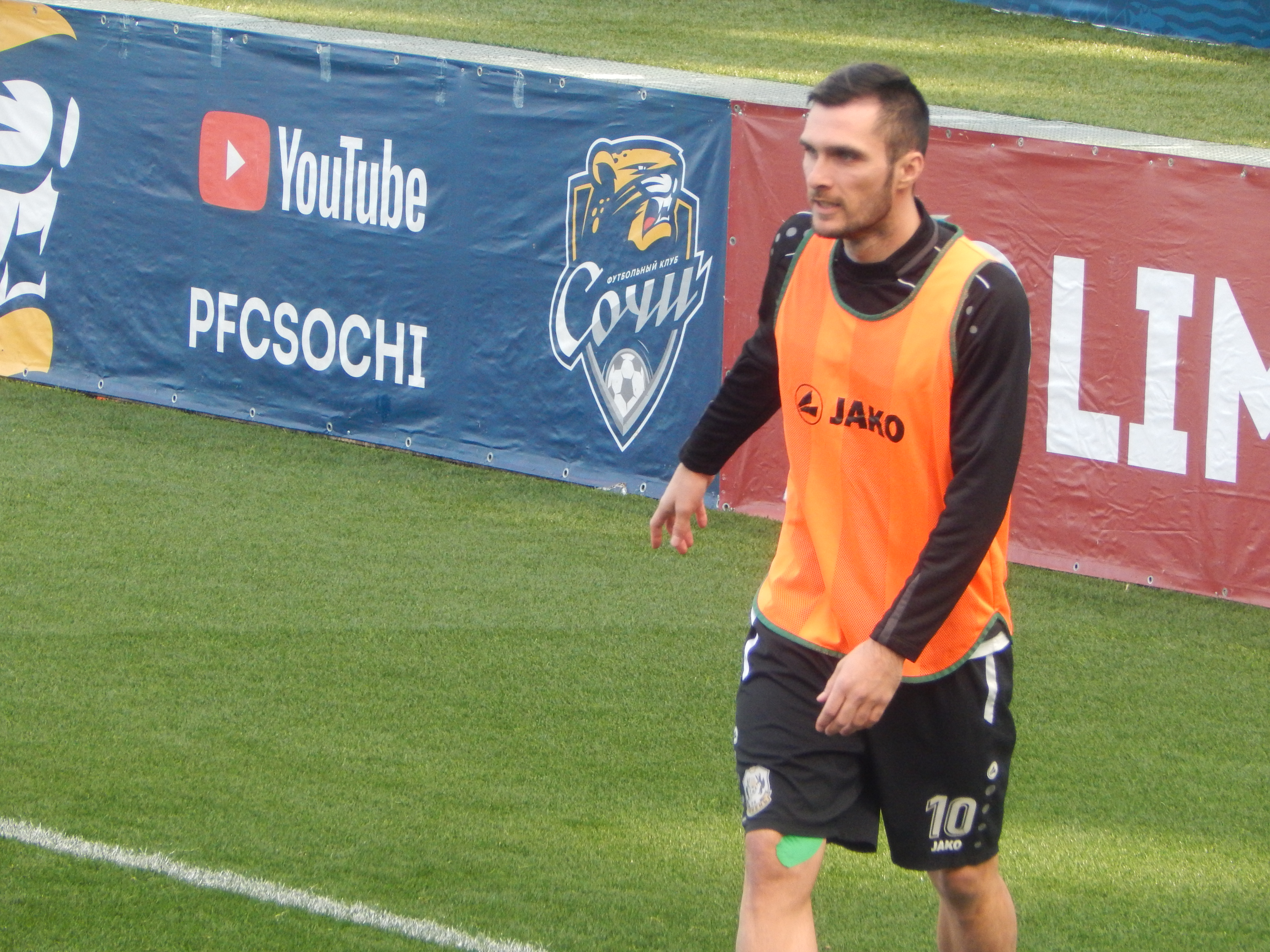
- Marinković in 2019

Personal information
- Date of birth: 28 September 1988 (age 38)
- Place of birth: Knjaževac, SFR Yugoslavia
- Height: 1.80 m (5 ft 11 in)
- Position: Winger

Youth career
- 2001–2005: Partizan

Senior career*
Years	Team	Apps	(Gls)
2004–2010	Partizan	18	(1)
2004–2010	Teleoptik	70	(32)
2007	→ Banat Zrenjanin (loan)	5	(0)
2009	→ OFI (loan)	6	(0)
2010–2011	Smederevo	15	(4)
2011–2013	Bnei Yehuda Tel Aviv	80	(14)
2013	Servette	5	(0)
2013–2014	Hapoel Acre	24	(1)
2014–2015	Partizan	8	(1)
2015	→ Voždovac (loan)	12	(3)
2016	Voždovac	11	(5)
2016	Gaziantep BB	5	(1)
2017	Voždovac	10	(2)
2017–2018	Mladost Lučani	8	(0)
2018	Rad	31	(2)
2019	FC Tyumen	11	(0)
2019	Mačva Šabac	10	(0)
2020	Sileks	4	(0)
2020–2021	Teleoptik	0	(0)
Total		333	(66)

International career
2004–2005	Serbia and Montenegro U17	6	(6)
2005–2007	Serbia U19	6	(2)
2010	Serbia U21	2	(0)
- * Club domestic league appearances and goals as of 1 January 2021

Nenad Marinković (Serbian Cyrillic: Ненад Маринковић; born 28 September 1988) is a Serbian retired professional footballer, who played as a winger.

== Club career ==
Marinković joined Partizan in 2001. He was one of the most promising youngsters at both club and national level, playing together in generation with Miloš Bosančić and Miralem Sulejmani, among others. On 5 December 2004, Marinković made his first team debut in a 3–1 home win over Čukarički, becoming the youngest ever player to appear for the club at 16 years and 68 days, breaking a 15-year-old record held by Dejan Marković. He signed his first professional contract with Partizan in December 2005, agreeing to a three-year deal. However, Marinković failed to make an impact in the first team, also being loaned for several times during his contract.

In the summer of 2010, Marinković moved to Smederevo. He appeared in all 15 league games and scored four goals in the fall season, securing a transfer to Israeli club Bnei Yehuda Tel Aviv in February 2011. Marinković spent the following two and a half years at the club, scoring 14 league goals in 80 appearances.

In June 2013, Marinković was transferred to Swiss club Servette. He left the club after less than three months, making a return to Israeli football by signing with Hapoel Acre.

On 8 August 2014, Marinković returned to Partizan, on a two-year deal. He was loaned to Voždovac in the summer of 2015, before signing a permanent contract with the club in January 2016.

On 11 June 2017, Marinković signed with Mladost Lučani.

== International career ==
Marinković represented Serbia at the 2007 UEFA European Under-19 Championship in Austria.

== Personal ==
His older brother is Nebojša Marinković.
