= Bojan Šljivančanin =

Montenegrin footballer (born 1982)

Personal information
- Full name: Bojan Šljivančanin
- Date of birth: 4 May 1982 (age 44)
- Place of birth: Pljevlja, SR Montenegro, SFR Yugoslavia
- Height: 1.92 m (6 ft 4 in)
- Position: Centre-back

Youth career
- Rudar Pljevlja

Senior career*
Years	Team	Apps	(Gls)
2001–2003	Rudar Pljevlja	28	(2)
2003–2004	Vojvodina	5	(1)
2004	→ Radnički Obrenovac (loan)		
2005	Jedinstvo Bijelo Polje	8	(0)
2006–2007	Partizan	1	(1)
2006	→ Rudar Pljevlja (loan)	2	(0)
2007	→ Teleoptik (loan)		
2015	Serbian White Eagles		
Total		44	(4)
- * Club domestic league appearances and goals

Bojan Šljivančanin (Montenegrin Cyrillic: Бојан Шљиванчанин; born 4 May 1982) is a Montenegrin former professional footballer who played as a defender.

== Career ==
Šljivančanin started out at his hometown club Rudar Pljevlja, spending two seasons in the First League of Serbia and Montenegro (2001–2003). He completed a transfer to Vojvodina in the 2003 summer transfer window.

In January 2006, Šljivančanin signed a four-year contract with Partizan. He marked his debut with a goal from a free kick in a 3–2 away league win against his former club Vojvodina. This would remain his sole official appearance for Partizan.

In 2015, he signed with the Serbian White Eagles of the Canadian Soccer League.
