= Miloš Bosančić =

Serbian footballer (born 1988)

Personal information
- Date of birth: 22 May 1988 (age 38)
- Place of birth: Ruma, SFR Yugoslavia
- Height: 1.82 m (6 ft 0 in)
- Position: Attacking midfielder

Youth career
- Red Star Belgrade
- Partizan

Senior career*
Years	Team	Apps	(Gls)
2005–2007	Partizan	19	(0)
2005–2006	→ Teleoptik (loan)	10	(1)
2007	→ Boavista (loan)	1	(0)
2008	→ OFK Beograd (loan)	12	(2)
2008–2009	Čukarički	24	(1)
2009–2012	Slovan Liberec	72	(13)
2013–2014	Gyeongnam	41	(9)
2014–2015	Red Star Belgrade	19	(0)
2015	Hangzhou Greentown	8	(0)
2016	BEC-Tero Sasana	21	(1)
2017–2018	Slovan Liberec	29	(1)
2018	Keşlə	2	(0)
2018–2019	Sabah	10	(1)
2019	Voždovac	2	(0)
2019	Rad	6	(0)

International career
2003–2005	Serbia and Montenegro U17	12	(1)
2005–2007	Serbia U19	11	(5)
2004–2010	Serbia U21	10	(1)
- * Club domestic league appearances and goals

Miloš Bosančić (Serbian Cyrillic: Милош Босанчић; born 22 May 1988) is a Serbian retired professional footballer who played as an attacking midfielder.

== Club career ==
Bosančić came through the youth system of Partizan, signing his first professional contract with the club in December 2005. He made his competitive debut in the 2006–07 season, collecting 26 appearances across all competitions. In June 2007, Bosančić moved to Portuguese club Boavista on a season-long loan. He appeared in only one game and returned to Partizan after just three months. In February 2008, Bosančić was loaned to OFK Beograd until the end of the season.

In September 2008, Bosančić signed a three-year contract with Čukarički. He appeared in 24 league games and scored one goal in the 2008–09 season, helping the club avoid relegation from the top flight. In July 2009, Bosančić moved abroad for the second time and signed with Slovak club Slovan Liberec. He was a regular member of the team that won Czech First League in the 2011–12 season, contributing with six goals in 25 appearances. In early 2013, Bosančić moved to Asia and signed with Gyeongnam.

In July 2014, Bosančić returned to Serbia and signed a three-year deal with Red Star Belgrade. He left the club the following year, before returning to Asia and joining Chinese side Hangzhou Greentown. In 2016, Bosančić played for Thai club BEC-Tero Sasana.

In February 2017, Bosančić rejoined his former club Slovan Liberec after four years. He signed a one-and-a-half-year contract and was given the number 10 shirt. In 2018, Bosančić briefly played for Keşlə, before moving to fellow Azerbaijani club Sabah.

In June 2019, Bosančić returned to his homeland and joined Voždovac. He left the club two months later and switched to fellow Belgrade club Rad.

== International career ==
In August 2004, Bosančić, aged 16, was called up to the Serbia and Montenegro under-21 team for a friendly against Slovenia in Ljubljana. He played the first half in an eventual 3–1 victory. Later on, Bosančić represented Serbia at the 2007 UEFA European Under-19 Championship.

== Honours ==
Slovan Liberec

- Czech First League: 2011–12
