= Nikola Grubješić =

Serbian footballer

Nikola Grubješić Никола Грубјешић
Personal information
- Full name: Nikola Grubješić
- Date of birth: 29 June 1984 (age 42)
- Place of birth: Šabac, SFR Yugoslavia
- Height: 1.80 m (5 ft 11 in)
- Position: Striker

Youth career
- 1999–2001: Partizan

Senior career*
Years	Team	Apps	(Gls)
2001–2005	Teleoptik	28	(21)
2003–2006	Partizan	33	(13)
2006	→ Voždovac (loan)	13	(5)
2006–2009	KAMAZ	64	(13)
2010	Čukarički	14	(3)
2010–2011	Hapoel Haifa	14	(1)
2012	AEL	14	(1)
2013	Leotar	12	(2)
2014–2015	Syrianska	23	(10)
2015	Dunaújváros	6	(0)
2015	Brommapojkarna	13	(2)
2017	Davao Aguilas	1	(0)

International career^{‡}
2003–2005	Serbia and Montenegro U21	3	(3)
- * Club domestic league appearances and goals as of 23 October 2018 ‡ National team caps and goals as of 23 October 2018

Nikola Grubješić (Serbian Cyrillic: Никола Грубјешић; born 29 June 1984) is a Serbian retired professional footballer and current coach.

== Club career ==
Grubješić came through the youth system at Partizan. He played for their affiliated club Teleoptik, before being promoted to Partizan's first team during the 2003–04 season.

== International career ==
Grubješić was a member of the Serbia and Montenegro national under-21 team for which he scored three goals in three appearances against Macedonia U21.

== Personal life ==
His father, Pavle Grubješić, also a footballer, played for Partizan in the 1970s.
