= List of FK Partizan players =

Fudbalski klub Partizan is a Serbian professional association football club based in Belgrade, Serbia, who currently play in the Serbian SuperLiga. They have played at their current home ground, Partizan Stadium, since 1949.

This is a list of all the football players that have played for club since its foundation, in 1945.

Only players that have played at least one match in any of the following competitions: domestic league, domestic cup and European competitions.

Players that only played in friendlies, tournaments and that were on trial are not included.

== A ==
- (Serbia) Branislav Aćimović
- (Serbia) Rodoljub Aćimović
- (Ghana) Dominic Adiyiah 8/0 (2011)
- (Bosnia and Herzegovina) Admir Aganović 0/0 (2004–2007) 1 game in Cup
- (Serbia) Nikola Aksentijević 36/1 (2010–2014)
- (Serbia) Živan Aleksić
- (Brazil) Anderson Marques 2/1 (2011–2012)
- (Cape Verde) Patrick Andrade 26/2 (2022–2023)
- (Serbia) Živodrag Andrić 1/1 (1956–1957)
- (Serbia) Nikola Antić 50/0 (2023–2025)
- (Serbia) Radomir Antić 196/9 (1970–1977)
- (Serbia) Nemanja Antonov 14/1 (2017–2018)
- (Serbia) Goran Arnaut 7/0 (1997–1998, 1999–2000)
- (Honduras) Kervin Arriaga 21/0 (2024–2025)
- (Serbia) Dragan Arsenović 55/1 (1974–1979)
- (Serbia) Ljubiša Arsenović 9/0 (1953–1955)
- (Serbia) Živko Arsić
- (Japan) Takuma Asano 77/30 (2019–2021)
- (Cyprus) Nikolas Asprogenis 19/0 (2005–2007)
- (North Macedonia) Stefan Aškovski 3/2 (2012–2013)
- (Serbia) Aleksandar Atanacković 136/24 (1946–1954)
- (Serbia) Branislav Atanacković 2/0 (2004–2005)
- (Serbia) Velimir Atanacković

== B ==
- (Serbia) Dejan Babić 6/0 (2011–2013)
- (Serbia) Milan Babić 14/0 (1980–1981)
- (Serbia) Stefan Babović 157/26 (2003–2006, 2010–2012, 2015)
- (Cameroon) Macky Bagnack 18/0 (2020–2021)
- (France) Jean-Christophe Bahebeck 8/1 (2020–2021)
- (Bosnia and Herzegovina) Branimir Bajić 159/7 (2000–2007)
- (Serbia) Mane Bajić 188/19 (1962–1970)
- (Montenegro) Milorad Bajović 43/10 (1985–1986, 1987–1988, 1989–1990))
- (Montenegro) Miodrag Bajović 115/3 (1985–1990)
- (Slovenia) Gregor Balažic 51/1 (2015–2017)
- (Serbia) Srđan Baljak 2/0 (1999–2000)
- (Bulgaria) Ivan Bandalovski 47/1 (2014–2016)
- (Bosnia and Herzegovina) Slavko Banduka
- (Montenegro) Zoran Batrović 47/16 (1987–1989)
- (Bosnia and Herzegovina) Samed Baždar 74/12 (2021–2024)
- (Montenegro) Miladin Bečanović 56/17 (2000–2003)
- (Serbia) Radoslav Bečejac 107/18 (1963–1967)
- (Serbia) Stevan Becin
- (Serbia) Kristijan Belić 55/3 (2022–2024)
- (Croatia) Bruno Belin 240/18 (1951–1962)
- (Serbia) Budimir Belojević
- (Montenegro) Božidar Belojević 16/0 (1952–1955)
- (Serbia) Darko Belojević 16/0 (1984–1989)
- (Serbia) Rahim Beširović 36/12 (1995–1996)
- (Serbia) Veljko Birmančević 3/0 (2015–2016)
- (Serbia) Nenad Bjeković 210/86 (1969–1976)
- (Serbia) Nenad Bjeković Jr. 68/17 (1991–1995, 1998–1999)
- (Serbia) Blagojević
- (North Macedonia) Dragoljub Blažić 20/3 (1957–1959)
- (Croatia) Stjepan Bobek 239/170 (1946–1959)
- (Serbia) Todor Bogdanović
- (Serbia) Goran Bogdanović 187/17 (1985–1993)
- (Serbia) Gradimir Bogojevac 12/0 (1951)
- (Serbia) Miroslav Bogosavac 26/0 (2015–2017)
- (Serbia) Miloš Bogunović 73/12 (2008–2011)
- (Bulgaria) Valeri Bojinov 67/25 (2015–2017)
- (Serbia) Dražen Bolić 114/21 (1994–1998)
- (Serbia) Petar Borota 84/0 (1976–1979)
- (Bosnia and Herzegovina) Ranko Borozan 48/3 (1954–1957)
- (Serbia) Bosanac
- (Serbia) Miloš Bosančić 26/0 (2006–2007)
- (Serbia) Miroslav Bošković 38/4 (1973–1975)
- (Cameroon) Pierre Boya 101/17 (2003–2007, 2010–2011)
- (Montenegro) Darko Božović 29/0 (2007–2009)
- (Montenegro) Mladen Božović 95/0 (2008–2010)
- (Serbia) Branislav Branilović
- (Serbia) Vladimir Branković 2/0 (2008–2009)
- (Serbia) Darko Brašanac 115/10 (2009–2016)
- (Serbia) Rajko Brežančić 35/1 (2007-2010, 2019-2022)
- (Montenegro) Bojan Brnović 20/2 (2003–2005)
- (Montenegro) Branko Brnović 116/20 (1991–1994)
- (Montenegro) Dragoljub Brnović 39/4 (1988–1989)
- (Montenegro) Nenad Brnović 69/8 (2004–2006)
- (Serbia) Zenun Brovina 1/0 (1963–1964)
- (Croatia) Miroslav Brozović 40/2 (1946–1948)
- (Serbia) Jovica Budisavljević 1/0 (1971–1972)
- (Serbia) Nikola Budišić 111/0 (1967–1974)
- (North Macedonia) Predrag Burčul 1/0 (1967–1968)

== C ==
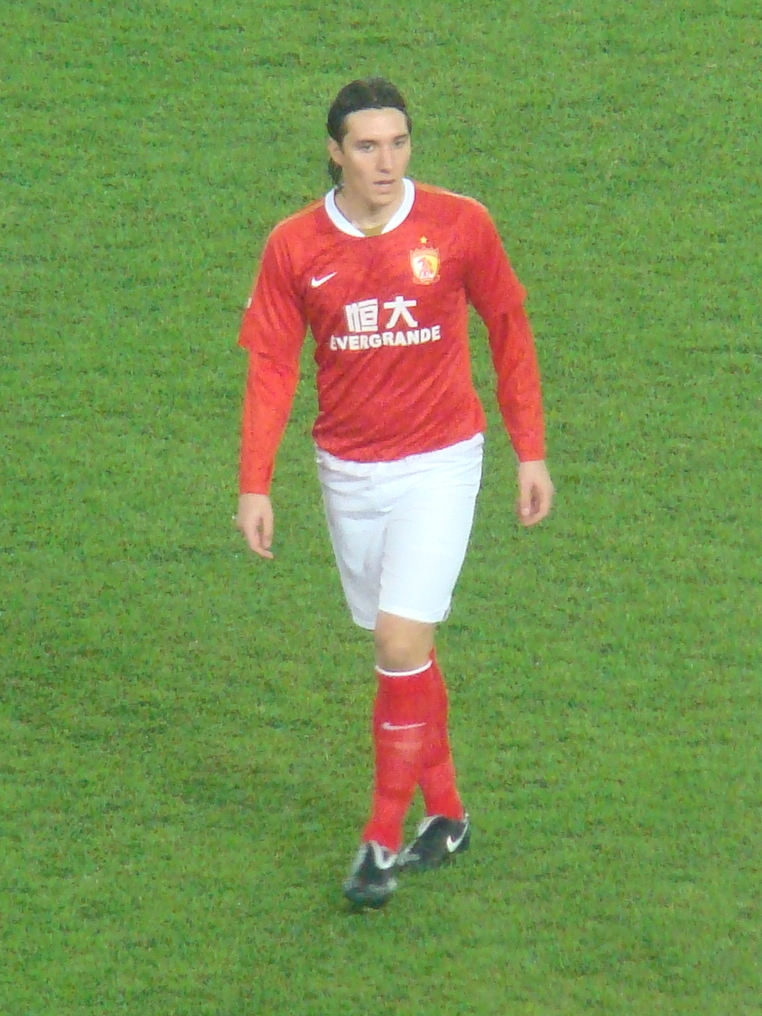
Cléo, Partizan's Player of the Year in 2010

- (Croatia) Zvonko Canjuga 1/0 (1947–1948)
- (Ecuador) Denil Castillo 15/2 (2024)
- (Serbia) Petar Cestić
- (Colombia) Andrés Colorado 14/1 (2023)
- (Brazil) Cléo 67/42 (2009–2011)
- (Serbia) Luka Cucin 5/0 (2017–2019)
- (Serbia) Zoran Cvetanović 20/1 (1970–1975)
- (Serbia) Nenad Cvetković 48/12 (1972–1975)

== Ć ==
- (Montenegro) Marko Ćetković 10/0 (2007–2008)
- (Serbia) Dragan Ćirić 193/52 (1992–1997, 2004–2005)
- (Serbia) Milovan Ćirić
- (Serbia) Zoran Ćirić 8/0 (1997–1998)
- (Serbia) Lazar Ćirković 49/0 (2014–2018)
- (Serbia) Milivoje Ćirković 142/2 (1999–2007)
- (Serbia) Jovan Ćurčić 11/0 (1963–1965)
- (Serbia) Saša Ćurčić 89/19 (1993–1995)
- (Serbia) Željko Ćurčić
- (Australia) Michael Ćurčija 1/0 (2000–2001)
- (Bosnia and Herzegovina) Ivan Ćurković 227/0 (1964–1972)

== Č ==
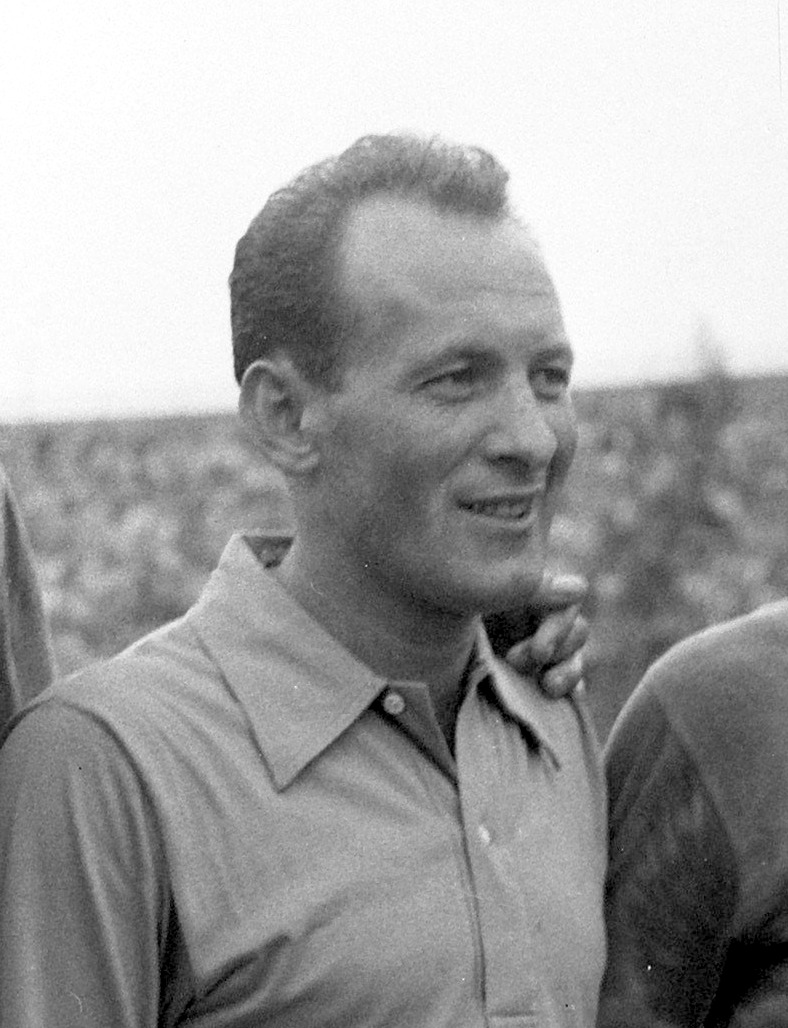
Zlatko Čajkovski

- (Serbia) Ivan Čabrinović
- (North Macedonia) Dragan Čadikovski 23/5 (2007–2009)
- (Croatia) Zlatko Čajkovski 190/28 (1946–1955)
- (Montenegro) Damir Čakar 174/73 (1995–1997, 2001–2004)
- (Bosnia and Herzegovina) Vlado Čapljić 58/4 (1985–1988)
- (Serbia) Srđan Čebinac 20/8 (1956–1960)
- (Serbia) Zvezdan Čebinac 107/12 (1958–1964)
- (Serbia) Miroslav Čermelj 24/0 (1993–1995)
- (Serbia) Latif Čičić 10/0 (1968–1969)
- (Serbia) Ratko Čolić 142/0 (1946–1956)
- (Serbia) Borko Čudović 3/0 (1954–1955)
- (Serbia) Dejan Čurović 41/25 (1993–1994)

== D ==
- (Bosnia and Herzegovina) Nikola Damjanac 102/0 (1992–1993, 1994–1997, 1998–2000)
- (Serbia) Milan Damjanović 175/1 (1962–1971)
- (Montenegro) Darmanović
- (Serbia) Aleksandar Davidov 41/4 (2009–2011)
- (Belgium) Nathan De Medina 8/0 (2023–2025)
- (Serbia) Dimitri Davidovic 25/0 (1963–1967)
- (Montenegro) Andrija Delibašić 126/63 (1999–2003)
- (Mali) Fousseni Diabaté 45/7 (2022–2023)
- (Senegal) Lamine Diarra 151/75 (2007–2010, 2011–2012)
- (Serbia) Zoran Dimitrijević 75/8 (1981–1985)
- (Cameroon) Eric Djemba-Djemba 16/0 (2013–2014)
- (Serbia) Rajko Dotlić
- (Serbia) Vanja Dragojević 52/4 (2024–2026)
- (Serbia) Božidar Drenovac 34/2 (1947–1953)
- (Montenegro) Nikola Drinčić 56/5 (2003–2004, 2014–2015)
- (Serbia) Slavko Drljača 2/0 (1969–1970)
- (Serbia) Ljubinko Drulović 38/6 (2003–2004)
- (Serbia) Igor Duljaj 207/6 (1997–2004)
- Dunai
- (Croatia) Mario Duplančić 3/0 (1952–1953)
- (Croatia) Josip Duvančić 22/4 (1956–1958)

== Đ ==
- (Serbia) Danilo Đaković
- (Serbia) Đambas
- (Serbia) Milenko Đedović 2/0 (1995–1996)
- (Serbia) Miloš Đelmaš 162/25 (1979–1987)
- (Serbia) Armin Đerlek 32/1 (2017–2019)
- (Serbia) Aleksandar Đoković 1/0 (2008–2009)
- (Serbia) Borivoje Đorđević 195/22 (1965–1975)
- (Serbia) Boško Đorđević 138/35 (1972–1980)
- (Serbia) Nenad Đorđević 204/18 (2003–2009)
- (Croatia) Svemir Đorđić 202/33 (1968–1976)
- (Montenegro) Branislav Đukanović 33/0 (1987–1988)
- (Serbia) Nenad Đukanović 18/0 (1996–1998)
- (Montenegro) Milonja Đukić 74/15 (1984–1986, 1988–1989)
- (Serbia) Slađan Đukić 13/1 (1990–1991)
- (Serbia) Vladislav Đukić 67/24 (1988–1989, 1990–1992)
- (Serbia) Aleksandar Đurđević
- (Serbia) Milan Đurđević 59/19 (1989–1991)
- (Serbia) Milivoje Đurđević 17/0 (1946–1947)
- (Montenegro) Uroš Đurđević 45/35 (2016–2017)
- (Serbia) Nikola Đurđić 17/1 (2016–2017)
- (Serbia) Zoran Đurić 68/6 (1994–1996)
- (Serbia) Živko Đurić
- (Serbia) Saša Đuričić 2/0 (1993–1994)
- (Serbia) Petar Đuričković 40/2 (2016–2017)
- (Montenegro) Borislav Đurović 153/4 (1975–1980)
- (North Macedonia) Milko Đurovski 83/45 (1986–1990)

== E ==
- (Guinea-Bissau) Ednilson 16/0 (2008)
- (Brazil) Eduardo Pacheco 25/5 (2011–2012)
- (Libya) Mohamed El Monir 7/0 (2016–2017)
- (Brazil) Eliomar 7/0 (2012–2013)
- (Nigeria) Ifeanyi Emeghara 56/0 (2004–2006)
- (Romania) Gabriel Enache 15/2 (2018–2019)
- (Serbia) Eraković
- (Serbia) Slobodan Eskić
- (Brazil) Everton Luiz 72/3 (2016–2018)

== F ==
- (Brazil) Fabrício Dornellas 22/0 (2015–2016)
- (Serbia) Ljubomir Fejsa 103/2 (2008–2011, 2022–2023)
- (Serbia) Aleksandar Filipović 88/8 (2022–2025)
- (Serbia) Tomislav Filipović 4/0 (1967–1968)
- (Croatia) Vladimir Firm 34/3 (1946–1949)
- (Ivory Coast) Ismaël Béko Fofana 22/8 (2013–2016)
- (Serbia) Koriolan Foljan
- (Switzerland) Pape Fuhrer
- (Slovenia) Funtek
- (Bosnia and Herzegovina) Mladen Furtula 23/0 (1970–1973)

== G ==
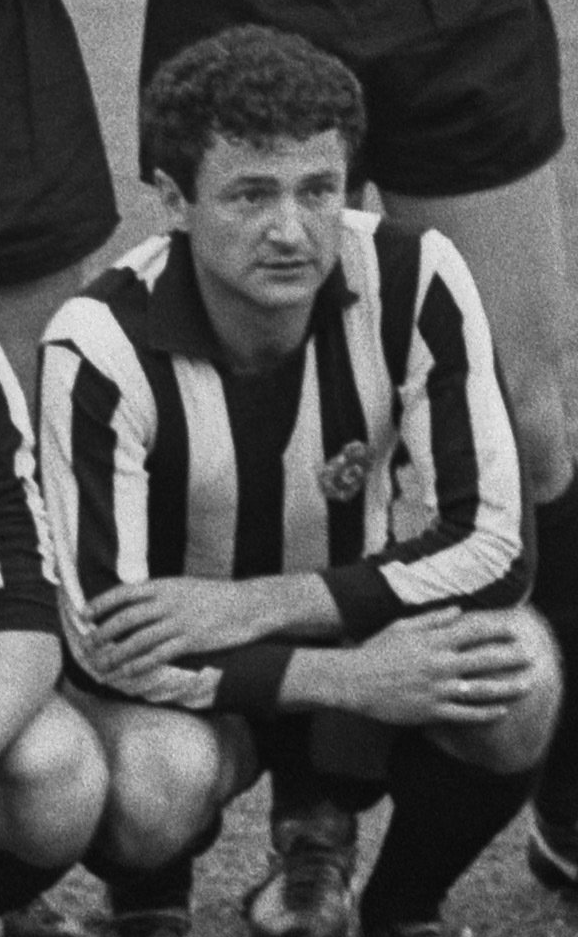
Milan Galić, legendary Partizan's striker and member of the team that played in the 1966 European Cup Final against Real Madrid

- (Serbia) Ivan Gajić 1/0 (1994–1995)
- (Bosnia and Herzegovina) Milan Galić 180/95 (1958–1966)
- (Croatia) Ivan Gašpar
- (Serbia) Goran Gavrančić 27/0 (2009–2010)
- (North Macedonia) Marjan Gerasimovski 65/5 (1998–2001)
- (Serbia) Đorđe Gerum
- (Croatia) Franjo Glaser 16/0 (1946–1947)
- (Serbia) Nemanja Glavčić 3/0 (2015–2016)
- (Ivory Coast) Cédric Gogoua 12/1 (2016)
- (South Korea) Goh Young-jun 42/2 (2024–2025)
- (Serbia) Ivan Golac 125/3 (1971–1978)
- (Serbia) Marko Golubović 17/2 (2015–2016)
- (Cape Verde) Ricardo Gomes 151/92 (2018–2019, 2021–2023)
- (Montenegro) Petar Grbić 68/6 (2013–2016)
- (Serbia) Milomir Grbin
- (Croatia) Rajko Grčević 3/0 (1947–1950)
- (Serbia) Todor Grebenarević 1/0 (1965–1966)
- (Peru) Joao Grimaldo 10/0 (2024–2026)
- (Serbia) Nikola Grubješić 49/15 (2003–2006)
- (Serbia) Pavle Grubješić 139/28 (1970–1981)
- (Serbia) Todor Grujić
- (Bosnia and Herzegovina) Nebojša Gudelj 123/10 (1991–1994)
- (Serbia) Nikola Gulan 26/0 (2006–2007, 2013–2015)

== H ==
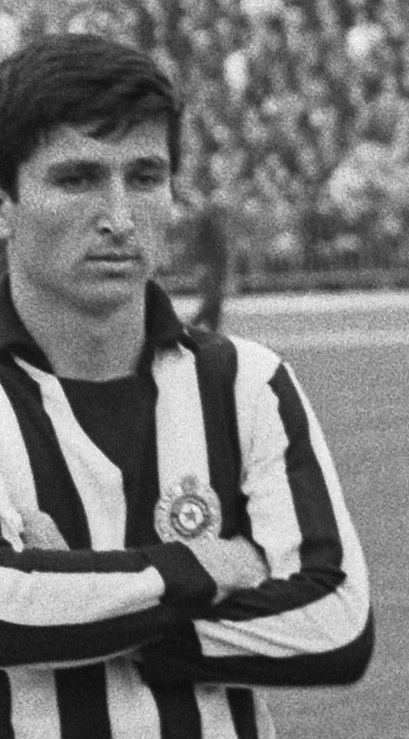
Mustafa Hasanagić, made more than 100 appearances and member of the team that played in the 1966 European Cup Final against Real Madrid

- (Bosnia and Herzegovina) Hajdarević
- (Serbia) Mustafa Hasanagić 133/73 (1961–1969)
- (Bosnia and Herzegovina) Jusuf Hatunić 118/0 (1976–1981)
- (Serbia) Antun Herceg 163/44 (1951–1958)
- (Serbia) Bogdan Hiblović
- (Croatia) Drago Hmelina 12/6 (1954–1956)
- (Slovenia) Edvard Hočevar 3/2 (1950)
- (Hungary) Filip Holender 69/11 (2020-2022)
- (Croatia) Horvat
- (Bosnia and Herzegovina) Idriz Hošić 82/38 (1966–1970)
- (North Macedonia) Georgi Hristov 77/27 (1994–1997)
- (Brazil) Vítor Hugo 4/0 (2007–2008)

== I ==
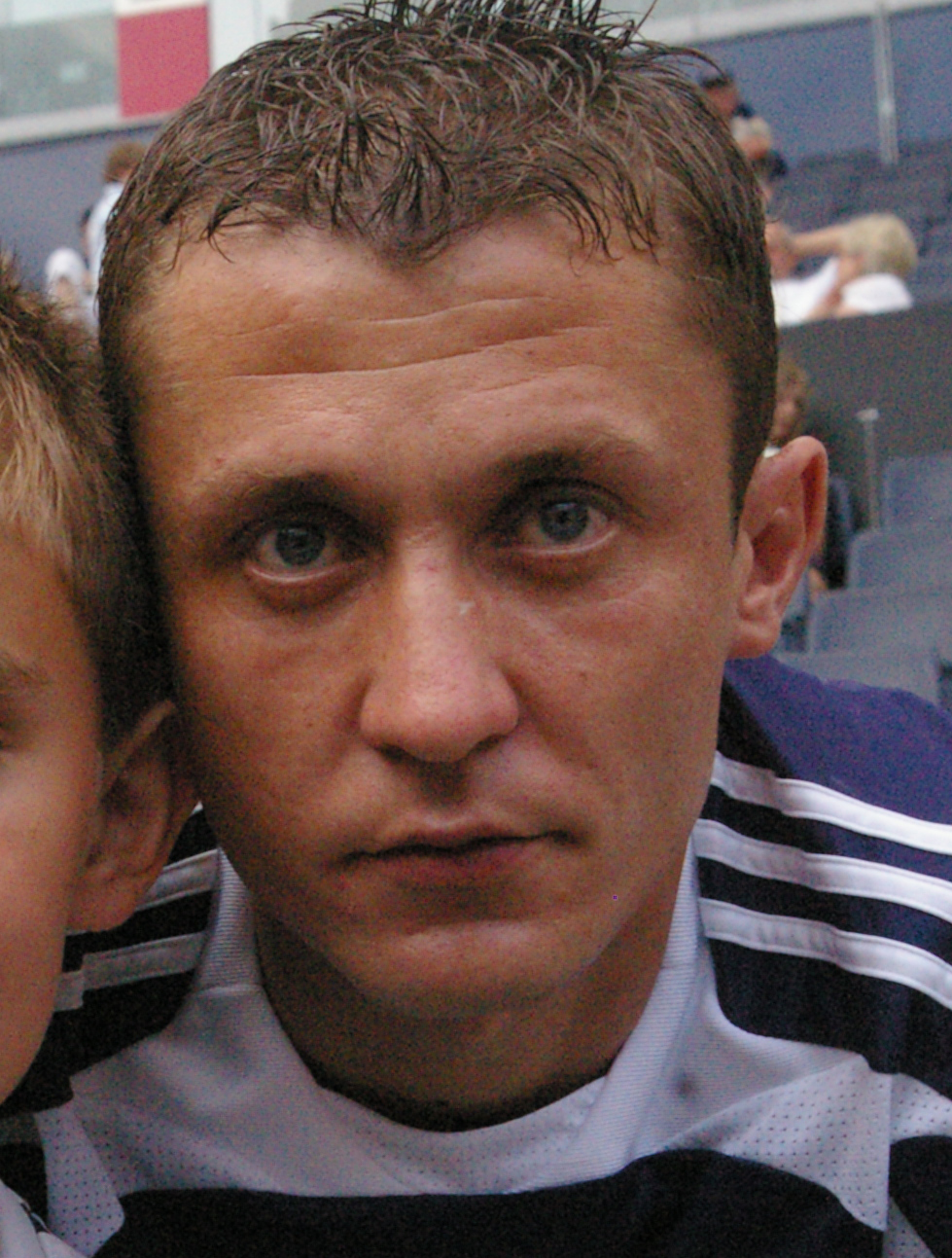
Saša Ilić, the club's most capped player of all-time with more than 800 appearances

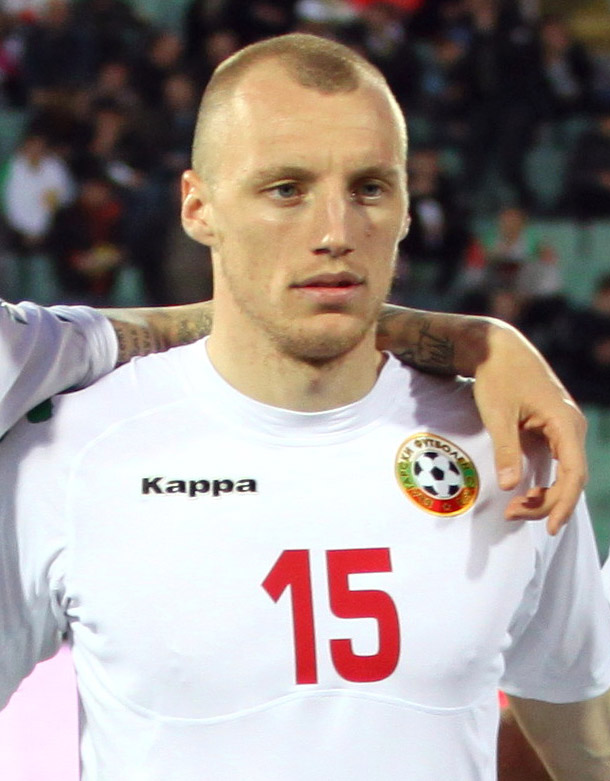
Ivan Ivanov, Partizan player of the year 2012, Bulgarian Footballer of the Year 2013

- (Serbia) Brana Ilić 46/8 (2009–2010)
- (Slovenia) Branko Ilić 41/4 (2014–2015)
- (Serbia) Mihajlo Ilić 63/5 (2021–2024, 2024–2025)
- (Serbia) Radiša Ilić 102/0 (1998–2003, 2010–2013)
- (North Macedonia) Saša Ilić 7/0 (1990–1995)
- (Serbia) Saša Ilić 604/159 (1996–2005, 2010–2019)
- (Serbia) Ivica Iliev 239/70 (1997–2004, 2010–2011)
- (Serbia) Filip Ilišić 1/0 (2010–2011)
- (Serbia) Dragan Isailović 36/20 (1997–1998)
- (North Macedonia) Blagoj Istatov 50/0 (1973–1976)
- (Serbia) Radmilo Ivančević 74/0 (1975–1977, 1979–1981)
- (Bulgaria) Ivan Ivanov 83/10 (2011–2013)
- (Serbia) Đorđe Ivanović 70/17 (2017–2020)
- (Serbia) Velimir Ivanović 6/0 (2000–2001)
- (North Macedonia) Ivanovski
- (Serbia) Vladimir Ivić 176/66 (1998–2004)
- (Serbia) Saša Ivković 2/0 (2013–2014)

== J ==
- (Slovenia) Safet Jahič 7/0 (2006–2007)
- (Serbia) Lajoš Jakovetić 64/2 (1947–1952)
- (Serbia) Dejan Jakšić
- (Serbia) Stevan Jakuš 5/0 (1946–1949)
- (Bosnia and Herzegovina) Orhan Jamaković
- (North Macedonia) Jane Janevski 6/1 (1946–1947)
- (Montenegro) Marko Janković 101/13 (2016–2019)
- (Serbia) Jankulov
- (North Macedonia) Slave Jankulovski
- (Serbia) Tika Jelisavčić 2/1 (1953–1954)
- (Serbia) Dragoljub Jeremić 80/1 (1997–1998, 2000–2005)
- (Serbia) Milorad Jeremić 13/0 (1966–1967)
- (Serbia) Miodrag Ješić 170/14 (1980–1985, 1990–1991)
- (Serbia) Goran Jevtić 4/0 (1989–1990)
- (Serbia) Marko Jevtović 122/12 (2015–2018, 2022)
- (Serbia) Jovan Jezerkić 9/9 (1947–1948)
- (China) Jia Xiuquan 19/0 (1987–1989)
- (Serbia) Stanoje Jocić 50/25 (1954–1957)
- (Serbia) Vladimir Jocić 19/0 (1979–1981)
- (Serbia) Dragan Jojić
- (Serbia) Miloš Jojić 133/22 (2012-2014, 2020-2022)
- (Serbia) Slaviša Jokanović 82/26 (1990–1993)
- (Serbia) Dejan Joksimović 15/3 (1989–1990)
- (Bosnia and Herzegovina) Igor Joksimović 8/2 (1999-2001)
- (Serbia) Aleksandar Jončić 73/0 (1956–1964)
- (Bosnia and Herzegovina) Vladimir Jovančić 16/1 (2011–2012)
- (Serbia) Aleksandar Jovanović 87/0 (2023–2025)
- (Serbia) Branislav Jovanović 27/0 (2009–2011)
- (Serbia) Dušan Jovanović 23/2 (2023–2026)
- (Serbia) Dragoslav Jovanović 36/0 (1958–1964)
- (Serbia) Đorđe Jovanović 49/10 (2016-2018, 2024–2025)
- (Serbia) Marko Jovanović 103/2 (2007–2011, 2015–2016)
- (Serbia) Miodrag Jovanović 183/1 (1946–1956)
- (North Macedonia) Jovanovski
- (Montenegro) Stevan Jovetić 61/23 (2005–2008)
- (Serbia) Marko Jovičić 16/0 (2015–2018)
- (Serbia) Milan Jović 13/1 (1994–1996)
- (Serbia) Milovan Jović 39/7 (1977–1980)
- (Serbia) Nemanja Jović 93/11 (2020–2023)
- (Serbia) Nemanja Jovšić 5/0 (2004–2007)
- (Brazil) Juca 59/10 (2007–2009)
- (Russia) Juraj Jurak
- (Slovenia) Mario Jurčevič
- (Serbia) Svetozar Jurišić
- (Serbia) Fahrudin Jusufi 195/2 (1957–1966)
- (Slovenia) Vjekoslav Juvan

== K ==
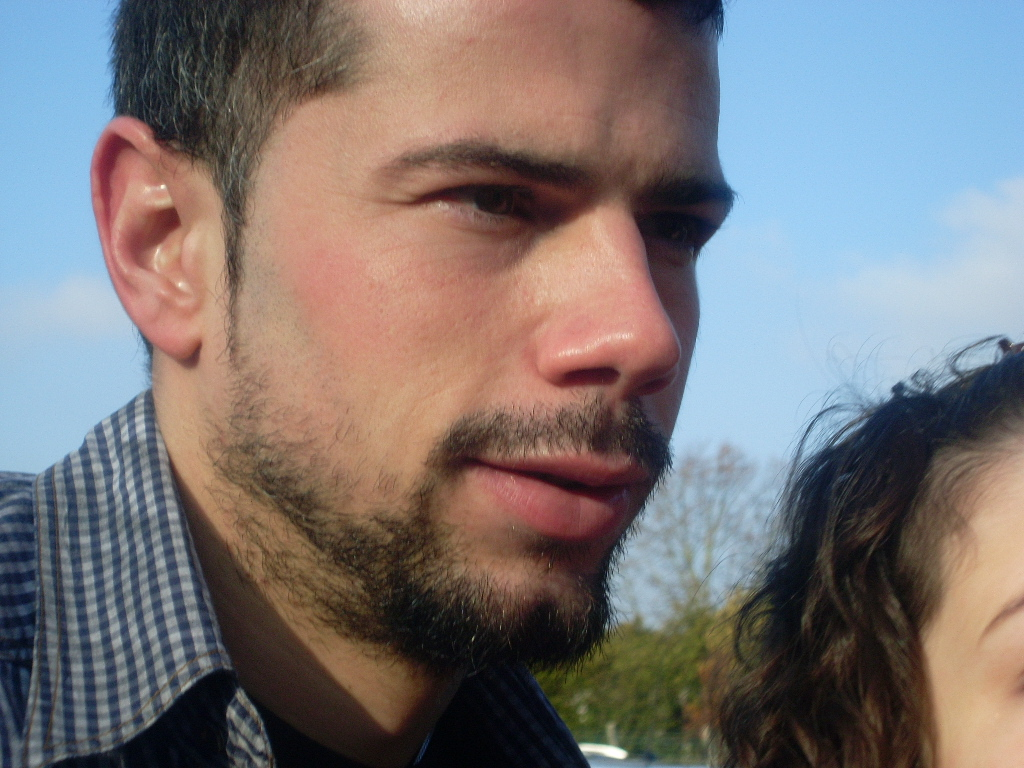
Mateja Kežman, played in Partizan from 1998 to 2000

- (Serbia) Dragi Kaličanin 101/9 (1980–1985)
- (Serbia) Tomislav Kaloperović 130/34 (1955–1961)
- (Democratic Republic of the Congo) Aldo Kalulu 88/9 (2023–2025)
- (Sierra Leone) Medo Kamara 79/0 (2010–2013)
- (Serbia) Radenko Kamberović 3/0 (2010)
- (Serbia) Milan Kantardžić
- (Senegal) Franck Kanouté 22/1 (2023–2024)
- (Serbia) Ninoslav Kapamadžija
- (Bulgaria) Yanis Karabelyov 27/2 (2025–2026)
- (Serbia) Slavko Karanović 1/0 (1983–1984)
- (Montenegro) Petar Kasom 1/0 (1999–2000)
- (Slovenia) Srečko Katanec 64/9 (1986–1988)
- (Serbia) Ilija Katić 144/30 (1968–1973)
- (Serbia) Katinčić
- (Serbia) Mateja Kežman 74/43 (1998–2000)
- (South Korea) Kim Chi-woo 8/0 (2004–2005)
- (Serbia) Pavle Kiš 1/0 (1958–1959)
- (Uganda) Joseph Kizito 17/0 (2010–2011)
- (North Macedonia) Nikica Klinčarski 298/20 (1976–1985, 1987–1989)
- (Serbia) Miloje Kljajević 16/0 (1988–1990)
- (Serbia) Filip Kljajić 55/0 (2014–2020)
- (Serbia) Filip Knežević 1/0 (2012–2013)
- (Serbia) Miodrag Knežević 15/0 (1971–1972)
- (Serbia) Srđa Knežević 83/2 (2007–2010)
- (Serbia) Nemanja Kojić 55/17 (2013–2016)
- (Croatia) Božidar Kolaković 37/1 (1950–1954)
- (Serbia) Jovica Kolb 40/1 (1984–1990)
- (Serbia) Dragan Komnenović 1/0 (1957–1958)
- (Serbia) Stipan Kopilović 2/0 (1947–1948)
- Ivan Koren
- (Bosnia and Herzegovina) Aleksandar Kosorić 2/0 (2008–2009)
- (Montenegro) Nebojša Kosović 81/5 (2015–2019)
- (Montenegro) Andrej Kostić 42/12 (2025–2026)
- (Montenegro) Novica Kostić 11/0 (1981–1983)
- (Serbia) Koščičarić
- (Bosnia and Herzegovina) Stefan Kovač 33/5 (2024–2025)
- (Serbia) Bojan Kovačević 16/1 (2024–2025)
- (Serbia) Milenče Kovačević
- (Serbia) Tomislav Kovačević 57/0 (1976–1980)
- (Serbia) Vladica Kovačević 226/105 (1958–1966, 1967–1970)
- (Serbia) Kovjanić
- (Serbia) Refik Kozić 183/15 (1972–1980)
- (Bosnia and Herzegovina) Mehmed Krajišnik
- (Serbia) Mitar Krajšić
- (Montenegro) Ivica Kralj 197/0 (1995–1998, 2000–2001, 2003–2007)
- (Croatia) Milan Kranjčić 14/0 (1958–1960)
- (Serbia) Slobodan Krčmarević 72/29 (1983–1984, 1991–1993)
- (Serbia) Krgin
- (Serbia) Mladen Krstajić 180/17 (1995–2000, 2009–2011)
- (Bosnia and Herzegovina) Nijaz Kulenović
- (Bosnia and Herzegovina) Rešad Kunovac 110/4 (1975–1981)
- (Serbia) Milojko Kurčubić 3/0 (1971–1974)
- (Bosnia and Herzegovina) Nenad Kutlačić
- (North Macedonia) Stevica Kuzmanovski 3/0 (1982–1983)

== L ==
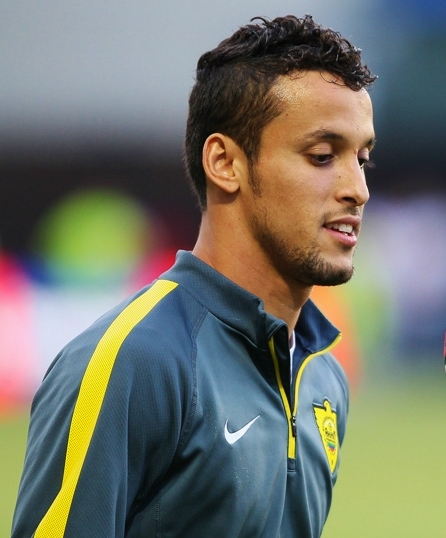
Leonardo, 2016–17 season topscorer with 24 goals along teammate Đurđević

- (Serbia) Nikola Lakčević 12/0 (2017–2024)
- (Montenegro) Risto Lakić 2/0 (2007–2008)
- (Serbia) Petar Lalić
- (Serbia) Čedomir Lazarević 129/3 (1947–1959)
- (Serbia) Mladen Lazarević 12/0 (2006–2008)
- (Serbia) Žarko Lazetić 34/7 (2007–2008)
- (North Macedonia) Aleksandar Lazevski 75/3 (2007–2013)
- (Serbia) Lazić
- (Serbia) Đorđe Lazić 73/8 (2006–2009)
- (Serbia) Predrag Lazić 22/1 (2006–2008)
- (Serbia) Vlada Lazičić 32/0 (1978–1981)
- (Serbia) Lazović
- (Serbia) Danko Lazović 118/46 (2000–2003, 2006, 2014–2015)
- (Serbia) Dragan Lečić
- (Serbia) Nikola Leković 8/0 (2015–2016)
- (Brazil) Leonardo 41/27 (2016–2017)
- (Serbia) Ranko Leškov
- (Serbia) Ivan Ličanin
- (Serbia) Nebojša Ličanin 7/0 (1968–1970)
- (Serbia) Zoran Lilić 25/0 (1980–1983)
- (China) Liu Haiguang 7/3 (1987–1989)
- (Serbia) Adem Ljajić 57/12 (2008–2010)
- (Montenegro) Darko Ljubanović 7/0 (1997–1998)
- (Serbia) Marko Lomić 100/7 (2005–2007, 2009–2010)
- (Serbia) Saša Lopičić 1/0 (1983–1984)
- (Serbia) Goran Lovre 8/0 (2012–2013)
- (Serbia) Predrag Luka 62/10 (2013–2016)
- (Serbia) Milan Lukač 47/0 (2013–2015, 2021-2023)
- (Serbia) Ilija Lukić
- (Serbia) Saša Lukić 33/2 (2014–2016)
- (Serbia) Bratislav Luković
- (Serbia) Aleksandar Lutovac 89/3 (2019–2023)

== M ==
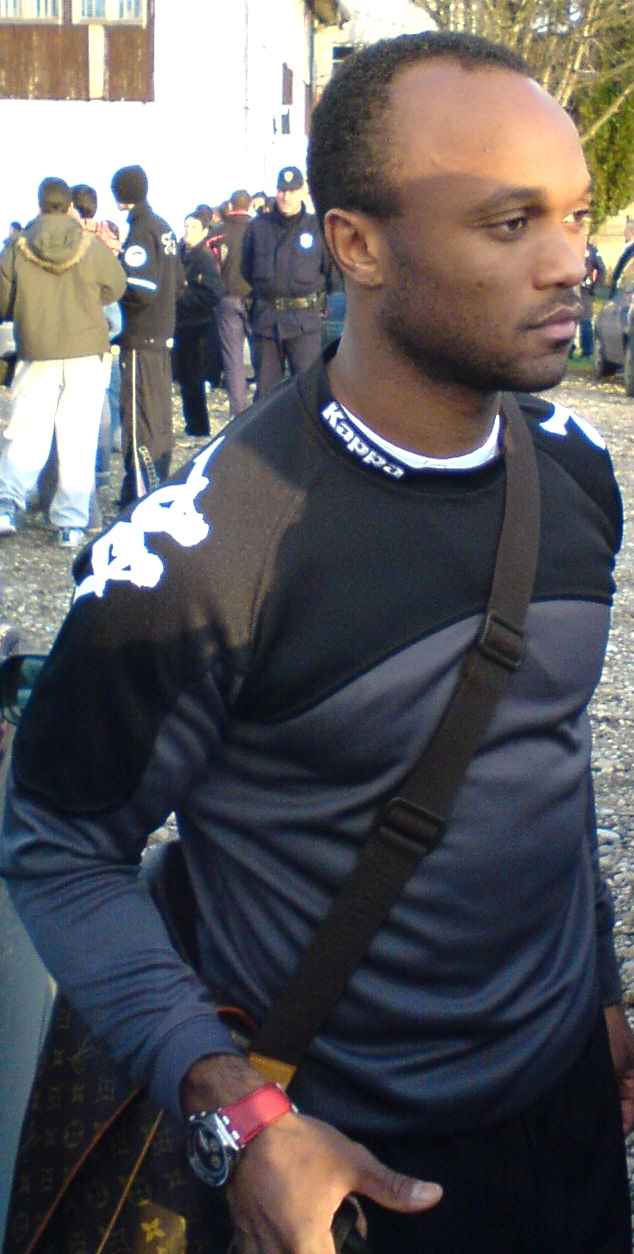
Almami Moreira Partizan fans idol. He played in Partizan from 2007 to 2011

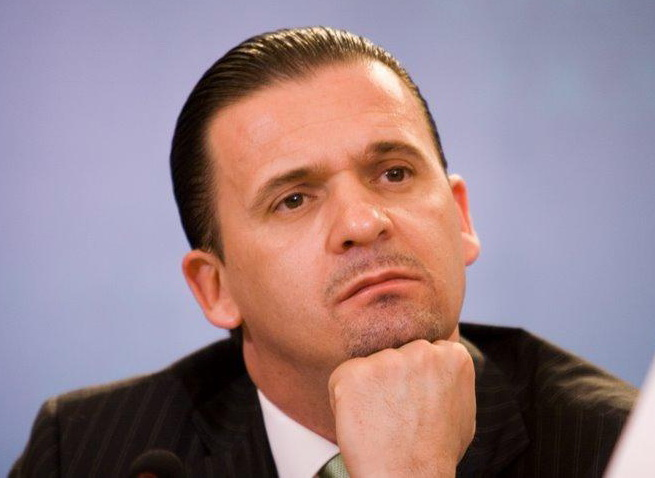
Predrag Mijatović, former Partizan and Real Madrid player

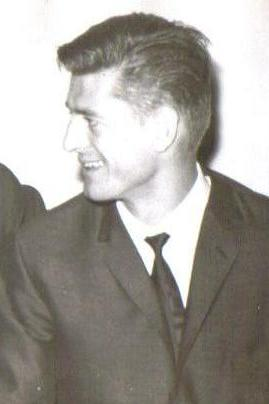
Miloš Milutinović, top scorer (8) of 1955–56 European Cup

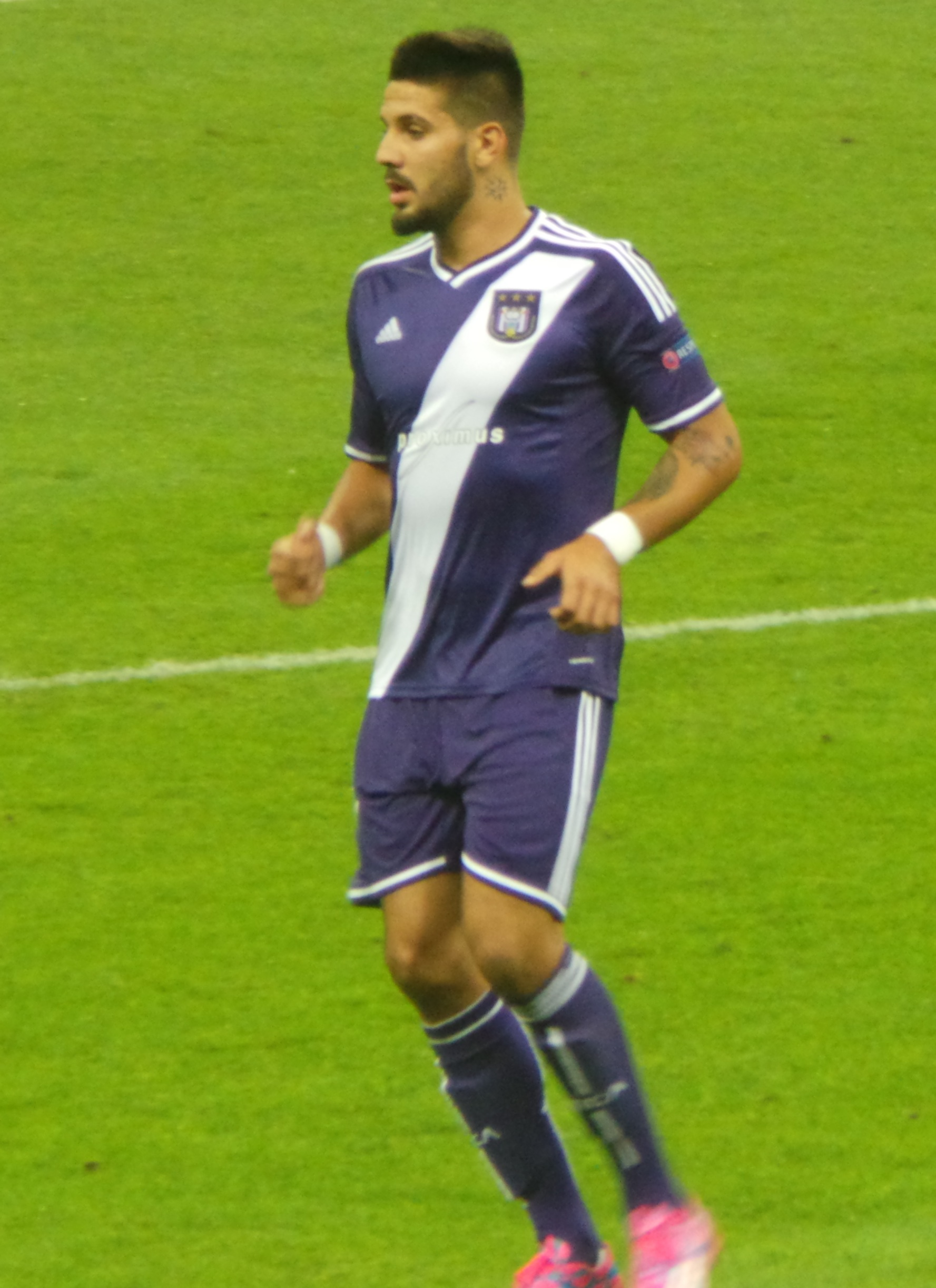
Aleksandar Mitrović, top scorer with 15 goals in his debut 2012–13 season

- (Hungary) Ferenc Makó
- (Serbia) Nikola Malbaša 54/3 (2002–2004)
- (Serbia) Filip Malbašić 25/2 (2013–2014)
- (Bosnia and Herzegovina) Darko Maletić 52/4 (2006–2009)
- (Serbia) Dragan Mance 134/47 (1980–1985)
- (Serbia) Milorad Mandić
- (Central African Republic) David Manga 11/1 (2011–2012)
- (Serbia) Nikola Manjko
- (Slovenia) Danijel Marčeta 2/0 (2008–2009)
- (Bosnia and Herzegovina) Đuro Marić 33/1 (1969–1972)
- (Serbia) Nebojša Marinković 47/18 (2003–2004, 2005–2008)
- (Serbia) Nenad Marinković 36/2 (2004–2007, 2008–2009, 2014–2015)
- (Serbia) Petar Marinković
- (Serbia) Dragomir Marjanović
- (Serbia) Nikola Marjanović 24/0 (1984–1985)
- (Serbia) Saša Marjanović 12/0 (2016–2018)
- (Serbia) Dejan Marković 29/1 (1989–1993)
- (Serbia) Lazar Marković 154/35 (2011-2013, 2019-2022)
- (Serbia) Marko Marković
- (Serbia) Miroslav Marković
- (Serbia) Ratomir Marković
- (Serbia) Saša Marković 88/11 (2011–2015)
- (Serbia) Svetozar Marković 157/13 (2017–2019, 2020–2021, 2022-2024)
- (Serbia) Vojislav Marković 13/0 (1967–1971)
- (Serbia) Marko Markovski 10/2 (2006–2007)
- (Serbia) Zoran Martinović
- (Bosnia and Herzegovina) Sead Mašić 52/0 (1978–1985)
- (Croatia) Florijan Matekalo 7/2 (1946–1947)
- (Serbia) Milan Matić 2/0 (1971–1973)
- (Serbia) Jovan Matković
- (Serbia) Dragutin Mehandžić
- (Serbia) Mihalj Mesaroš
- (Serbia) Miloš Mihajlov 41/1 (2006–2008)
- (Serbia) Branislav Mihajlović 107/51 (1955–1965)
- (Serbia) Branko Mihajlović 1/0 (2008–2009)
- (Serbia) Ljubomir Mihajlović 218/2 (1961–1970)
- (Serbia) Milan Mihajlović
- (Serbia) Nemanja Mihajlović 51/10 (2015–2017)
- (Serbia) Prvoslav Mihajlović 168/70 (1946–1957)
- (Serbia) Bratislav Mijalković 122/1 (1990–1996)
- (Serbia) Petar Mijatović 4/1 (1956–1957)
- (Montenegro) Predrag Mijatović 134/51 (1990–1993)
- (Serbia) Predrag Mijić 4/0 (2010)
- (Serbia) Jovan Miladinović 135/15 (1956–1966)
- (Slovenia) Darko Milanič 134/3 (1986–1993)
- (Serbia) Predrag Milanović
- (Serbia) Slobodan Milanović
- (Serbia) Nikola Milenković 44/4 (2015–2017)
- (Serbia) Miroslav Miletić
- (Serbia) Nemanja Miletić 99/3 (2016–2019)
- (Serbia) Nemanja Miletić 166/9 (2017–2020, 2021–2022)
- (Serbia) Slobodan Miletić 34/2 (1989–1990, 1991–1992)
- (Serbia) Zlatko Milić 56/0 (1972–1975)
- (Serbia) Nebojša Miličić 1/0 (1978–1979)
- (Serbia) Milan Milijaš 5/0 (2000–2001)
- (Serbia) Zoran Milinković 2/0 (1990–1991)
- (Serbia) Marko Milovanović 27/3 (2021-2022)
- (Serbia) Aleksandar Miljković 146/3 (2007–2013, 2020–2022)
- (Serbia) Slobodan Miljković 1/0 (1969–1970)
- (Serbia) Vojkan Miljković 1/0 (2008–2009)
- (Serbia) Goran Milojević 82/24 (1988–1990)
- (Serbia) Stanoje Miloradović 1/0 (1961–1962)
- (Serbia) Jovan Milošević 30/19 (2025–2026)
- (Serbia) Savo Milošević 119/78 (1992–1995)
- (Serbia) Boris Milošević 2/0 (1983–1984)
- (Serbia) Milovan Milović 27/1 (2004–2006)
- (Serbia) Bora Milutinović 53/6 (1960–1966, 1971–1972)
- (Serbia) Milorad Milutinović 76/1 (1956–1963)
- (Serbia) Miloš Milutinović 100/73 (1952–1957)
- (Serbia) Stevan Milutinović
- (Serbia) Uroš Milutinović
- (Serbia) Nemanja Mirković
- (Serbia) Spasoje Mirković
- (Serbia) Zoran Mirković 169/3 (1993–1996, 2003–2006)
- (Serbia) Nenad Mirosavljević 15/2 (2006–2007)
- (Bosnia and Herzegovina) Nenad Mišković 80/5 (1998–2004)
- (United States) Ilija Mitić 43/4 (1958–1963)
- (Serbia) Aleksandar Mitrović 42/18 (2012–2013)
- (Serbia) Milan Mitrović 24/2 (2016–2017)
- (Serbia) Nikola Mitrović 18/0 (2006–2007)
- (Serbia) Slobodan Mitrović
- (Serbia) Mladenović
- (Netherlands) Queensy Menig 108/22 (2021–2024)
- (Guinea-Bissau) Almani Moreira 132/30 (2007–2011)
- (Serbia) Petar Mrđa 2/0 (1965–1966)
- (Serbia) Mrvaljević
- (Bosnia and Herzegovina) Nihad Mujakić 34/0 (2024–2026)
- (Serbia) Srđan Mulćan 1/0 (2010–2011)
- (Bosnia and Herzegovina) Siniša Mulina 13/2 (1996–1997)

== N ==
- (Serbia) Albert Nađ 258/16 (1992–1996, 2002–2007)
- (Serbia) Branko Nadoveza 23/0 (1969–1970)
- (Serbia) Ljubomir Nanušević
- (Israel) Bibras Natcho 289/83 (2019–2026)
- (Montenegro) Aleksandar Nedović 5/1 (2000–2004)
- (Cameroon) Alexis Ngambi 3/0 (2008–2009)
- (Montenegro) Zoran Nikitović 7/0 (1978–1980)
- (Serbia) Radosav Nikodijević 30/1 (1984–1986)
- (Serbia) Nemanja Nikolić 107/25 (2018–2019, 2023–2025)
- (North Macedonia) Rista Nikolić/Nikolovski
- (Bosnia and Herzegovina) Simo Nikolić 13/3 (1974–1977)
- (Serbia) Vladan Nikolić
- (Bulgaria) Asen Nikolov 3/0 (2006–2007)
- (Serbia) Nikola Ninković 121/17 (2011–2016)
- (Norway) Moussa Njie 2/0 (2018–2019)
- (Croatia) Norković
- (Slovenia) Džoni Novak 41/5 (1990–1992)
- (Serbia) Ajazdin Nuhi 29/0 (2001–2003)

== O ==
- (Serbia) Goran Obradović 111/39 (1996–2000)
- (Serbia) Ivan Obradović 111/3 (2006-2009, 2020-2022)
- (Serbia) Milan Obradović 29/1 (2013–2014)
- (Nigeria) Obiora Odita 68/24 (2004–2007)
- (Montenegro) Dejan Ognjanović 42/2 (2001–2004)
- (Serbia) Radivoje Ognjanović 19/2 (1952–1953, 1961–1962)
- (Serbia) Žarko Olarević 25/1 (1967–1969, 1971–1972)
- (Bosnia and Herzegovina) Fahrudin Omerović 266/0 (1984–1992)
- (Serbia) Bojan Ostojić 130/4 (2016-2022)
- (Serbia) Miloš Ostojić 57/3 (2011–2016)
- (Cameroon) Aboubakar Oumarou 26/10 (2015–2016)
- (Ghana) Leonard Owusu
- (Serbia) Ognjen Ožegović 56/18 (2017–2019)

== P ==
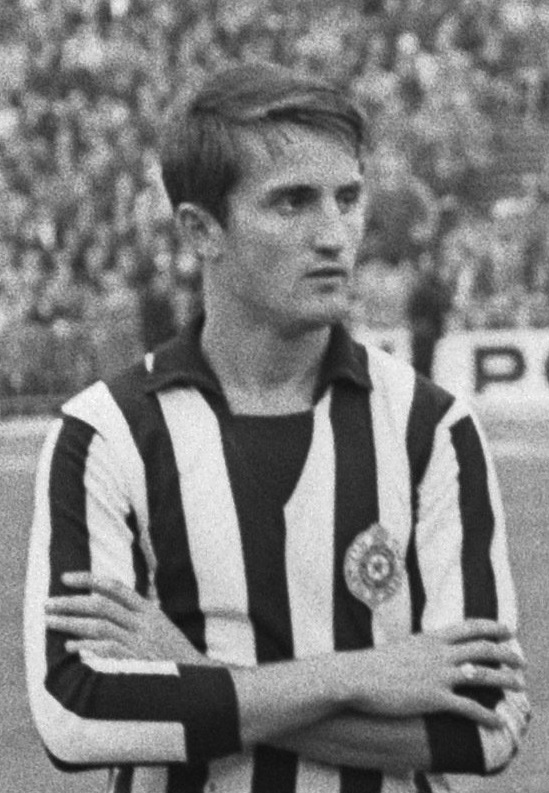
Josip Pirmajer, member of the team that played in the 1966 European Cup Final against Real Madrid

- (Montenegro) Božidar Pajević 177/9 (1953–1961)
- (Montenegro) Milutin Pajević 26/8 (1948–1951)
- (Serbia) Milorad Pajković
- (Serbia) Tomislav Pajović 7/0 (2012–2013)
- (Serbia) Bela Palfi 34/5 (1946–1948)
- (Serbia) Goran Pandurović 149/1 (1989–1995)
- (Serbia) Danilo Pantić 163/20 (2012–15, 2017–19, 2021–2024)
- (Serbia) Đorđe Pantić 38/0 (2001–2007)
- (Serbia) Milinko Pantić 76/8 (1985–1988, 1989–1991)
- (Serbia) Branko Pauljević 7/0 (2012–2013)
- (Serbia) Blagoje Paunović 254/2 (1965–1975)
- (Serbia) Slavoljub Paunović
- (Serbia) Veljko Paunović 36/3 (1994–1995, 2008–2009)
- (Serbia) Slobodan Pavković
- (Serbia) Andrija Pavlović 25/2 (2022–2024)
- (Serbia) Lazar Pavlović 63/4 (2019–2022)
- (Serbia) Strahinja Pavlović 57/2 (2018–2020)
- (Bulgaria) Predrag Pažin 78/8 (1995–1999)
- (Serbia) Branko Pejović
- (Serbia) Vlada Pejović 178/0 (1967–1978)
- (Serbia) Dejan Peković 17/2 (1995–1997)
- (Montenegro) Milorad Peković 54/5 (1999–2001)
- (Serbia) Srećko Perčin
- (Serbia) Milan Perić 3/0 (2008–2009)
- (Montenegro) Vukan Perović 31/8 (1975–1977)
- (Montenegro) Blažo Pešikan 1/0 (1992–1993)
- (Montenegro) Periša Pešukić 2/0 (2019–2020)
- (Serbia) Vladimir Petković 1/0 (1995–1996)
- (Serbia) Borislav Petrić 5/0 (1981–1982)
- (Serbia) Gordan Petrić 140/6 (1988–1994)
- (Serbia) Aleksandar Petrović 1/0 (2001–2002)
- (Serbia) Branimir Petrović 24/1 (2004–2006)
- (Serbia) Ivan Petrović 1/0 (2014–2015)
- (Serbia) Marko Petrović
- (Serbia) Miomir Petrović 26/0 (1948–1950)
- (Serbia) Miodrag Petrović
- (Serbia) Miroslav Petrović
- (Serbia) Nemanja Petrović 56/1 (2013–2016)
- (Serbia) Nikola Petrović 21/0 (2011–2013)
- (Serbia) Radosav Petrović 107/20 (2008–2011)
- (Serbia) Slobodan Dane Petrović 108/9 (1967–1971)
- (Serbia) Vladimir Petrović 7/0 (1961–1963)
- (Croatia) Ivan Pilko
- (Slovenia) Josip Pirmajer 142/32 (1964–1968)
- (Serbia) Momčilo Pivić
- (Serbia) Plazinić
- (Bosnia and Herzegovina) Ivica Pogarčić 5/1 (1967–1968)
- (Serbia) Miroslav Polak 9/0 (1976–1978)
- (Germany) Sebastian Polter 17/2 (2026)
- (Romania) Virgil Popescu 18/0 (1946–1948)
- (Serbia) Aleksandar Popović 92/0 (2017–2023)
- (Serbia) Branislav Popović
- (Serbia) Ranko Popović 2/0 (1990–1991)
- (Serbia) Zvonko Popović 56/2 (1980–1985)
- (Serbia) Marko Požega
- (Serbia) Miodrag Pregelj
- (Serbia) Dževad Prekazi 171/22 (1975–1983)
- (Serbia) Ljuan Prekazi 44/3 (1967–1969)
- (Serbia) Dragoslav Profirović 1/0 (1965–1966)

== R ==
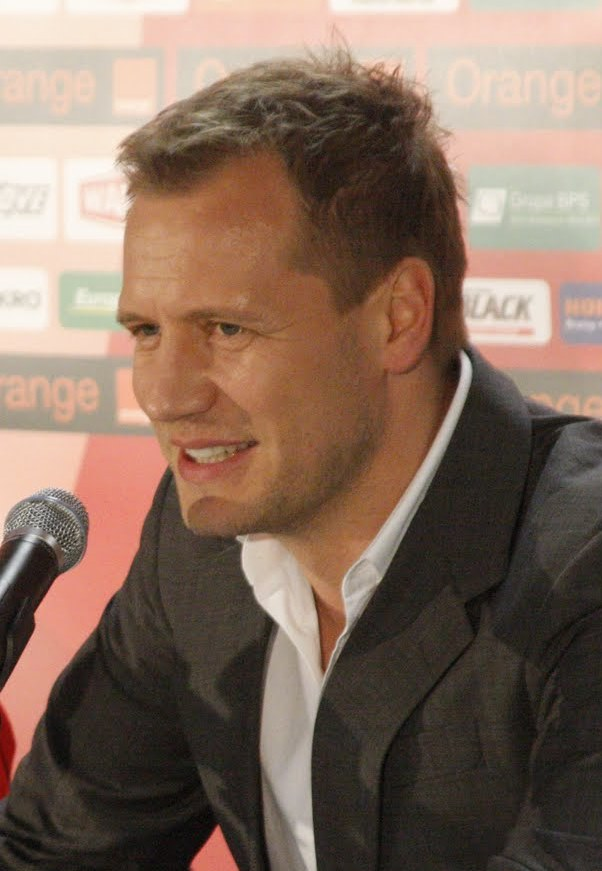
Polish defender Tomasz Rząsa signed for Partizan in 2003 and was member of the team that played in the 2003–04 UEFA Champions League group stage

- (Serbia) Nikola Racić
- (Serbia) Zoran Racić
- (Serbia) Dejan Radak 1/0 (1992–1993)
- (Serbia) Miloš Radaković 211/5 (1965–1973)
- (Serbia) Radovan Radaković 78/0 (2000–2004)
- (Montenegro) Ljubomir Radanović 197/16 (1981–1988)
- (Serbia) Dejan Rađenović 2/0 (1992–1993)
- (Serbia) Milan Radin 31/0 (2016–2018)
- (Serbia) Ivan Radivojević 2/0 (1990–1991)
- (Serbia) Slavko Radojković 11/0 (1973–1974)
- (Montenegro) Dženan Radončić 7/0 (2003–2004)
- (Montenegro) Srđan Radonjić 68/40 (2004–2007)
- (Serbia) Aleksandar Radosavljević 11/0 (2007–2008, 2009–2010)
- (Serbia) Dragan Radosavljević 14/0 (2006–2007)
- (Serbia) Ivan Radovanović 2/0 (2006–2007)
- (Serbia) Milan Radovanović
- (Montenegro) Lazar Radović 102/18 (1958–1965)
- (Serbia) Miodrag Radović 173/4 (1976–1987)
- (Montenegro) Miroslav Radović 82/13 (2003–2006, 2016)
- (Serbia) Radomir Radulović 15/0 (1982–1985)
- (Serbia) Momčilo Radunović 21/4 (1946–1949)
- (Croatia) Ivan Rajić 9/2 (1961–1963)
- (Serbia) Aleksandar Ranković 6/0 (2011–2012)
- (Serbia) Ljubiša Ranković 87/8 (1996–2002)
- (Montenegro) Branko Rašović 112/1 (1964–1969)
- (Serbia) Vuk Rašović 101/9 (1992–1993, 1998–2002)
- (Croatia) Miroslav Rede 10/2 (1956–1959)
- (North Macedonia) Vasil Ringov 1/0 (1973–1974)
- (Serbia) Nemanja Rnić 139/3 (2003–2008, 2011–2012)
- (Montenegro) Milan Roganović 69/0 (2023–2026)
- (Montenegro) Slobodan Rojević 167/1 (1981–1986)
- (Serbia) Antun Rudinski 10/6 (1962–1964)
- (Serbia) Antonio Rukavina 36/4 (2006–2008)
- (Serbia) Vladimir Ruman 8/0 (1951–1955)
- (Croatia) Franjo Rupnik 18/13 (1946–1947)
- (Serbia) Dejan Rusmir 16/0 (2001–2003)
- (Poland) Tomasz Rząsa 25/0 (2003–2004)

== S ==
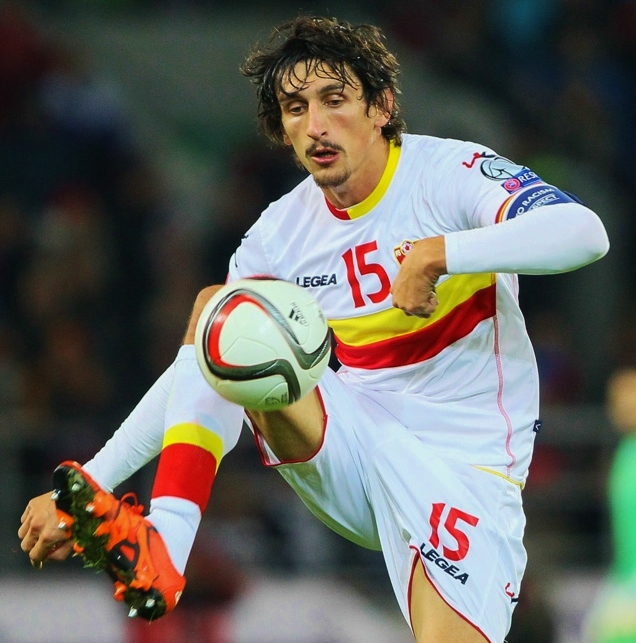
Stefan Savić signed for Partizan in 2010 and won the double in the 2010–11 season

- (Serbia) Zoltan Sabo 85/1 (1996–2000)
- (Serbia) Srećko Sabov
- (Nigeria) Umar Sadiq 52/23 (2019–2020)
- (Kosovo) Isa Sadriu 23/0 (1985–1987)
- (Brazil) Matheus Saldanha 40/21 (2023–2024)
- (Bosnia and Herzegovina) Enver Salihodžić 6/0 (1973–1974)
- (Bosnia and Herzegovina) Siniša Saničanin 75/2 (2021–2024)
- (Serbia) Slobodan Santrač 72/35 (1978–1980)
- (Bosnia and Herzegovina) Sead Sarajlić 11/0 (1983)
- (Montenegro) Niša Saveljić 113/18 (1995–1997, 2000–2001, 2005–2006)
- (Serbia) Branko Savić 162/2 (1997–2000, 2001–2004)
- (Montenegro) Stefan Savić 28/1 (2010–2011)
- (Croatia) Božidar Senčar 24/7 (1946–1950)
- (Serbia) Petar Sević
- (Curaçao) Xander Severina 45/8 (2023–2024)
- (Serbia) Milovan Sikimić 12/0 (2007–2009)
- (Serbia) Mirko Sikimić
- (Serbia) Vojislav Simeunović 1/0 (1964–1965)
- (North Macedonia) Kiril Simonovski 68/23 (1946–1949)
- (Serbia) Miroslav Sibinović
- (Serbia) Dragomir Slišković 17/1 (1960–1964)
- (Bosnia and Herzegovina) Admir Smajić 221/10 (1980–1988)
- (North Macedonia) Andreja Smileski
- (North Macedonia) Zoran Smileski 24/3 (1967–1969, 1971–1972)
- (Serbia) Milan Smiljanić 195/4 (2005-2007, 2010-2013, 2018–2022)
- (Nigeria) Theophilus Solomon 10/0 (2017–2018)
- (Bosnia and Herzegovina) Velimir Sombolac 105/0 (1959–1965)
- (Serbia) Dušan Sopić
- (Guinea) Seydouba Soumah 114/27 (2017–2021)
- (Serbia) Igor Spasić 3/0 (1990–1991)
- (Serbia) Predrag Spasić 78/3 (1988–1990)
- (Montenegro) Momčilo Spasojević 6/2 (1954–1960)
- (Serbia) Dimitrije Srbu
- (Bosnia and Herzegovina) Milan Srećo 1/0 (2004–2005)
- (Bosnia and Herzegovina) Borče Sredojević 47/1 (1988–1989)
- (Serbia) Sreten Sretenović 3/0 (2012–2013)
- (Serbia) Ivan Stamenković
- (North Macedonia) Perica Stančeski 1/0 (2005–2006)
- (Serbia) Branislav Stanić 1/0 (2007–2008)
- (Montenegro) Milan Stanić
- (Serbia) Dragan Stanisavljević 1/0 (1954–1955)
- (United States) Scoop Stanisic 56/0 (1983–1984)
- (Serbia) Stanković
- (Serbia) Ivan Stanković 9/0 (2001–2002)
- (Serbia) Vojislav Stanković 103/1 (2010–2015)
- (Serbia) Aleksandar Stanojević 53/0 (1998–2001)
- (North Macedonia) Vujadin Stanojković 147/10 (1989–1993)
- (Bosnia and Herzegovina) Slobodan Stanojlović 1/0 (2019–2020)
- (Serbia) Nenad Stavrić 2/0 (1981–1982)
- (Serbia) Dimitrije Stefanović 15/0 (1952–1954)
- (Serbia) Mileta Stefanović
- (Serbia) Vojo Stefanović
- (Serbia) Alen Stevanović 47/6 (2015–2017)
- (Serbia) Filip Stevanović 72/13 (2018–2021)
- (Serbia) Goran Stevanović 177/29 (1983–1991)
- (Serbia) Ivan Stevanović 57/4 (2008–2009, 2010–2011)
- (Serbia) Miladin Stevanović 14/1 (2014–2016)
- (Serbia) Miodrag Stevanović 6/0 (1979–1980)
- (Serbia) Nemanja Stevanović 57/0 (2016–2026)
- (Serbia) Siniša Stevanović 21/0 (2009–2010)
- (Serbia) Bogdan Stević 1/0 (2008–2009)
- (Serbia) Miroslav Stević 4/0 (1988–1989)
- (Bosnia and Herzegovina) Mladen Stipić
- (Serbia) Mateja Stjepanović 26/0 (2023–2025)
- (Montenegro) Slaven Stjepanović 10/1 (2007–2008)
- (Serbia) Žarko Stojadinović
- (Serbia) Nenad Stojaković 4/0 (1999–2000)
- (North Macedonia) Milan Stojanovski 128/9 (1998–2000, 2001–2004)
- (Croatia) Slavko Stojanović 162/1 (1951–1960)
- (Serbia) Tomislav Stojanović
- (Bosnia and Herzegovina) Ranko Stojić 100/0 (1980–1984)
- (Bosnia and Herzegovina) Miloš Stojičić 3/0 (1999–2000)
- (Serbia) Dragan Stojisavljević 89/6 (1996–2000)
- (North Macedonia) Aco Stojkov 1/0 (2006–2007)
- (Serbia) Aranđel Stojković 61/4 (2023–2026)
- (Serbia) Dennis Stojković
- (Serbia) Nenad Stojković 270/9 (1974–1984)
- (Serbia) Vladimir Stojković 255/1 (2010–2014, 2017–2021)
- (Serbia) Nebojša Stojmenović
- (Serbia) Lazar Stokić
- (Serbia) Ilija Stolica 6/0 (2000–2002)
- (Croatia) Zvonko Strnad 23/7 (1947–1949)
- (Albania) Albert Stroni
- (Bosnia and Herzegovina) Nenad Studen 1/0 (2000–2001)
- (Bosnia and Herzegovina) Aleksandar Subić 15/0 (2015–2016)
- (Serbia) Miralem Sulejmani 1/0 (2005–2006)
- (Serbia) Đorđe Svetličić 122/5 (1993–1999)
- (Serbia) Stanko Svitlica 1/0 (1995–1996)

== Š ==
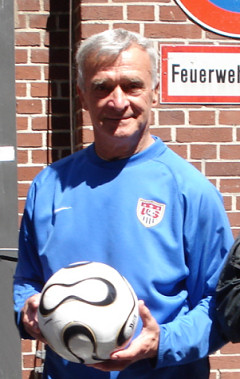
Milutin Šoškić, legendary Partizan's goalkeeper and member of the team that played in the 1966 European Cup Final against Real Madrid

- (North Macedonia) Šaban
- (Serbia) Branimir Šabanović
- (Croatia) Kujtim Shala 28/2 (1983–1984)
- (Serbia) Ivan Šaponjić 42/11 (2013–2016)
- (Serbia) Bojan Šaranov 23/0 (2016–2017)
- (Serbia) Nikola Štulić 26/1 (2020–2022)
- (Montenegro) Aleksandar Šćekić 186/14 (2018–2022, 2023–2025)
- (Serbia) Marko Šćepović 68/21 (2010–2013)
- (Serbia) Slađan Šćepović 156/30 (1984–1992)
- (Serbia) Stefan Šćepović 25/8 (2012–2013)
- (Serbia) Zlatan Šehović 33/1 (2018–2020, 2022-2025)
- (Serbia) Silvester Šereš 14/1 (1946–1948)
- (Montenegro) Vasilije Šijaković 11/5 (1950–1952)
- (Serbia) Slobodan Šipka
- (Serbia) Dalibor Škorić 5/0 (1993–1994)
- (Serbia) Petar Škuletić 40/28 (2014–2015)
- (Montenegro) Bojan Šljivančanin 1/1 (2005–2006)
- (Serbia) Milutin Šoškić 208/0 (1955–1966)
- (Serbia) Rajko Šoškić
- (Serbia) Slobodan Šoškić
- (Croatia) Franjo Šoštarić 104/0 (1946–1953)
- (Serbia) Pavle Šovljanski
- (Serbia) Uroš Španović
- (Hungary) Gyula Spitz
- (Serbia) Dušan Šuković
- (North Macedonia) Šepe Šutevski
- (Serbia) Radonja Šutović

== T ==
- (Ghana) Prince Tagoe 18/11 (2010–2011)
- (Serbia) Anton Tapiška
- (Serbia) Igor Taševski 147/2 (1994–1998)
- (Cameroon) Léandre Tawamba 70/21 (2017–2018)
- (Serbia) Milan Tepić
- (Serbia) Darko Tešović 154/29 (1993–1999)
- (Serbia) Aranđel Todorović 98/4 (1973–1980)
- (Serbia) Mirko Todorović 17/3 (1994–1995)
- (Serbia) Slobodan Todorović 26/0 (1971–1974)
- (Serbia) Stefan Todorović
- (Serbia) Đorđe Tomić 93/21 (1992–1994, 1998–2000)
- (Serbia) Ivan Tomić 179/31 (1993–1998, 2004–2007)
- (Serbia) Nemanja Tomić 158/31 (2008–2013)
- (Serbia) Predrag Tomić 41/1 (1973–1977)
- (Serbia) Miodrag Torbarov 9/0 (1950–1952)
- (Serbia) Milorad Tošić
- (Serbia) Zoran Tošić 142/44 (2007–2008, 2017–2020)
- (Serbia) Trajković
- (Mali) Hamidou Traoré 22/0 (2022-2023)
- (Serbia) Branislav Trajković 14/0 (2014)
- (North Macedonia) Viktor Trenevski 106/24 (1994–1998)
- (Serbia) Goran Trifković
- (Serbia) Aco Trifunović 230/23 (1976–1983)
- (Serbia) Tihomir Trifunović
- (Montenegro) Goran Trobok 237/18 (1997–2003)
- (Serbia) Nikola Trujić 13/3 (2015–2016)

== U ==
- (Serbia) Ismet Ugljanin
- (Serbia) Ognjen Ugrešić 63/13 (2024–2026)
- (Serbia) Slobodan Urošević 200/16 (2018–2023)
- (Serbia) Dejan Urumov

== V ==
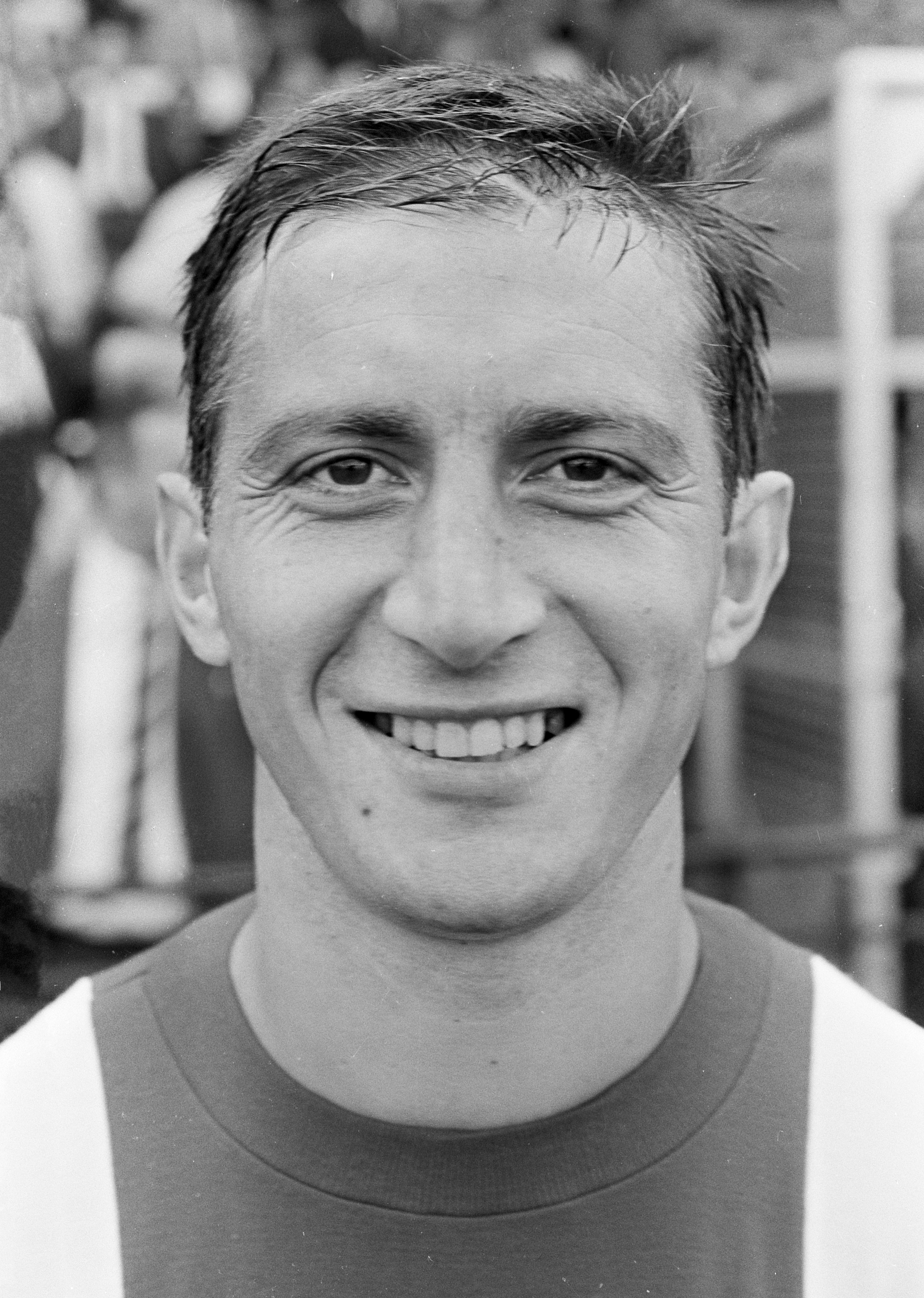
Velibor Vasović has scored a goal in 1966 European Cup Final against Real Madrid

- (Ukraine) Yuriy Vakulko 2/0 (2017–2018)
- (Spain) Marc Valiente 41/1 (2018–2019)
- (Serbia) Marko Valok 196/124 (1947–1959)
- (Serbia) Zvonko Varga 227/63 (1978–1986)
- (Serbia) Vasić
- (Serbia) Dimitrije Vasiljević
- (Serbia) Petar Vasiljević 68/5 (1990–1994)
- (Serbia) Velibor Vasović 155/4 (1958–1963, 1964–1966)
- (Serbia) Vladimir Vermezović 166/4 (1981–1989)
- (Serbia) Borko Veselinović 21/1 (2002–2008)
- (Serbia) Todor Veselinović 28/16 (1952–1953)
- (Serbia) Vidaković
- (Serbia) Videnović
- (Serbia) Miloš Vidović 28/1 (1965–1969)
- (Serbia) Joakim Vislavski 129/32 (1959–1967)
- (Serbia) Josip Višnjić 44/10 (1990–1991)
- (Serbia) Milan Vještica 9/0 (2008)
- (Serbia) Dušan Vlahović 27/3 (2015–2017)
- (Serbia) Vlaisavljević
- (Kosovo) Fadil Vokrri 68/24 (1986–1989)
- (Montenegro) Vladimir Volkov 112/10 (2011–2015)
- (Serbia) Stevan Vorgić 6/2 (1949–1954)
- (Serbia) Ljubomir Vorkapić 78/28 (1991–1994)
- (Montenegro) Zoran Vraneš 20/1 (1973–1975)
- (Serbia) Nebojša Vranić
- (Serbia) Miodrag Vranješ 4/0 (1974–1975)
- (Serbia) Nebojša Vučićević 169/35 (1984–1989)
- (Serbia) Branimir Vučković 1/0 (1970–1971)
- (Montenegro) Budimir Vujačić 151/16 (1989–1993)
- (Montenegro) Igor Vujačić 129/11 (2019–2023)
- (Montenegro) Nikola Vujović 19/3 (2008–2009)
- (Serbia) Slobodan Vujović
- (Serbia) Vlastimir Vukadinović
- (Serbia) Vladimir Vukajlović 1/0 (2005–2006)
- (Montenegro) Simon Vukčević 76/15 (2002–2006)
- (Serbia) Milan Vukelić 178/31 (1958–1969)
- (Serbia) Ljubiša Vukelja 14/0 (2006–2007)
- (Serbia) Zvonimir Vukić 156/72 (1999–2003, 2006, 2010–2012)
- (Montenegro) Dejan Vukićević 73/16 (1995–1998)
- (Serbia) Momčilo Vukotić 429/118 (1967–1978, 1979–1984)
- (Bosnia and Herzegovina) Aleksandar Vuković 27/3 (1998–2000)
- (Serbia) Novica Vulić 31/0 (1972–1978)
- (Serbia) Miroslav Vulićević 156/1 (2014–2019)

== W ==
- (Brazil) Washington 27/6 (2009–2010)
- (Nigeria) Taribo West 23/1 (2003–2004)

== Z ==
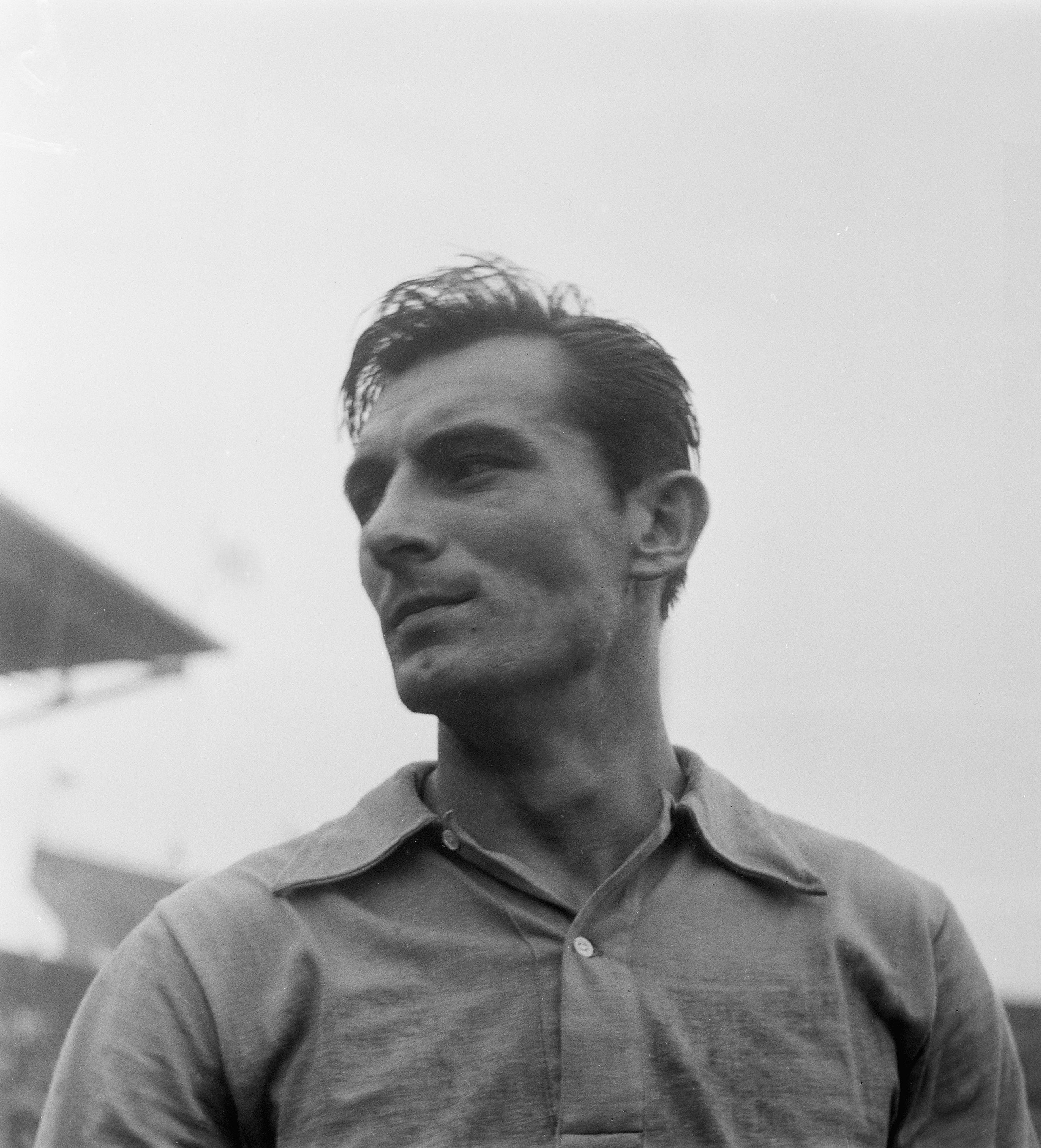
Branko Zebec, played in Partizan during 50s

- (Norway) Ghayas Zahid 70/9 (2023-2026)
- (Slovenia) Zlatko Zahovič 47/7 (1991-1993)
- (Tunisia) Kamel Zaiem 7/0 (2008-2009)
- (Serbia) Bojan Zajić 34/6 (2006-2007)
- (Serbia) Boško Zaklan
- (Serbia) Rade Zalad 75/0 (1978-1983)
- (Serbia) Bojan Zavišić 13/0 (2002-2004)
- (Serbia) Ilija Zavišić 193/28 (1971-1980)
- (Serbia) Saša Zdjelar 210/6 (2018-2022, 2026)
- (Croatia) Branko Zebec 148/48 (1952-1958)
- (Serbia) Bogdan Zlatić
- (Serbia) Marko Zorić 4/1 (2000-2001)
- (Serbia) Vladimir Zović
- (Ghana) Ibrahim Zubairu 59/18 (2024-)
- (Libya) Mohamed Zubya 9/1 (2012-2013)

== Ž ==
- (Serbia) Miodrag Živaljević 142/20 (1969-1975)
- (Serbia) Bogoljub Živanović
- (Serbia) Aleksandar Živković 4/0 (1994-1995)
- (Serbia) Andrija Živković 93/24 (2012-2015)
- (Serbia) Dejan Živković 13/1 (1999-2000, 2002-2003)
- (Serbia) Drago Živković
- (Serbia) Marko Živković 80/3 (2013, 2021-2026)
- (Serbia) Zvonko Živković 216/70 (1978-1986)
- (Serbia) Živko Živković 53/0 (2007–08, 2010–11, 2012–16)
- (Slovenia) Žumbar
- (Serbia) Bajro Župić 114/0 (1985-1990)

== Partizan players without official appearances ==
Includes players that spent time on contract with FK Partizan but did not make any official appearances, players that played in the Belgrade League, Mitleuropa Cup, guest players, players on trial with non-official appearances, and players with appearances for the reserve (B) team. Note: some players are attributed Serbian (domestic) nationality by default.

- (Serbia) Dušan Aksentijević
- (Kuwait) Fahad Al Enezi
- (Brazil) Alan
- (Serbia) Dražen Aleksić
- (Brazil) Alex
- (Croatia) Petar Alfirević
- (Nigeria) Alfred Emuejeraye
- Josip Ančić
- (Serbia) Goran Anđelić
- (Serbia) Siniša Angelovski
- (Serbia) Goran Antelj – Guest
- (Serbia) Sava Antić – BSK
- (Serbia) Miloje Arsenijević
- (Serbia) Nikola Arsić
- (Serbia) Zoran Arsić
- (Serbia) Nenad Atanasijević
- (Serbia) Dušan Avramović
- (Serbia) Babanović – Guest
- (Serbia) Dragan Babić
- (Serbia) Dragutin Babić
- (Serbia) Ivan Babić
- (Serbia) Backović
- (Serbia) Željko Bajić – Guest
- (Canada) Mike Bakić
- (Serbia) Miroslav Baralić
- (Serbia) Goran Basara
- (Serbia) Dušan Bašić
- (Croatia) Bego
- (Serbia) Jovan Beleslin
- (Croatia) Aleksandar Benko
- (Bosnia and Herzegovina) Branimir Bevanda
- (Serbia) Sava Bijelić
- (Serbia) Nikoslav Bjegović
- (Serbia) Miodrag Bogdanović
- (Montenegro) Dejan Boljević
- (Bosnia and Herzegovina) Vlado Borozan
- (Serbia) Vujadin Boškov – Vojvodina
- (Slovenia) Boško Boškovič
- (Serbia) Strahinja Bošnjak
- (Serbia) Nebojša Botunjac
- (Serbia) Velimir Božić
- (Montenegro) Vojin Božović
- (Serbia) Branimirović
- (Serbia) Dušan Brković
- (Serbia) Broz
- (Serbia) Buljugić
- (Puerto Rico) Andrés Cabrero
- (Croatia) Car
- (Serbia) Nemanja Crnoglavac
- (Serbia) Slobodan Cvetićanin
- (Montenegro) Jovan Cvjetković
- (Montenegro) Jovan Čađenović
- (Montenegro) Dragan Čalija
- (Serbia) Milivoj Čeleketić
- (Serbia) Petar Čestić
- (Serbia) Čimbur
- (Serbia) Đorđe Čokić
- (Serbia) Čolić
- (Serbia) Čolović
- (Croatia) Stjepan Čordaš
- (Serbia) Simo Čučak
- (Serbia) Nenad Čudić
- (Serbia) Bojan Čukić
- Vladimir Čulik
- (Serbia) Nebojša Čuljković
- (Serbia) Tomislav Ćirković
- (Montenegro) Zoran Ćulafić
- (North Macedonia) Aleksandar Damčevski
- (Serbia) Slavoljub Dačković
- (Serbia) Radoslav Dakić
- (Brazil) Daniel
- (Serbia) Aleksa Denković
- (North Macedonia) Denkovski – Guest
- (Serbia) Goran Dimitrijević
- (Serbia) Zvonko Dimitrijević
- (Serbia) Žarko Dobrojević
- (Serbia) Dorić – Guest
- (Serbia) Došen – Guest
- (Serbia) Nikola Dragićević
- (Serbia) Drča – Guest
- (Serbia) Radovan Drenjanin
- (Serbia) Milovan Droca
- (Serbia) Miljan Drpljanin
- (Serbia) Duvnjak – Guest
- (Serbia) Zdravko Đekić
- (Serbia) M. Đenić
- (Montenegro) Milan Đerić
- (Serbia) Dejan Đokić
- (Serbia) Jovan Đuknić
- (Serbia) Đupić
- (Serbia) Đuričić – Guest
- (Brazil) Elton Martins
- (Serbia) M. Erić
- (Tajikistan) Fatkhullo Fatkhuloev
- (Bosnia and Herzegovina) Emil Ferković
- (Serbia) Miloš Filimonović
- (Serbia) Filipović
- (Montenegro) Folić
- (Serbia) Ivica Francišković
- (Italy) Alessandro Furlan
- (Serbia) Nebojša Gajić
- (Serbia) Zoran Gajić
- (Bosnia and Herzegovina) Goran Galešić
- (Serbia) Bogdan Galić
- (Serbia) Ilija Galić
- (Serbia) Vladimir Gašić
- (Serbia) Goran Gavrilović
- (Serbia) Dejan Georgijević
- (Serbia) Dimitrije Gligorijević
- (North Macedonia) Gligorovski
- (Serbia) Golubović
- (Serbia) Zoran Grbić
- (Serbia) Ilija Grubor
- (Serbia) Branislav Guberinić
- (Serbia) Dragan Gugleta
- (Serbia) Srboljub Hadži Mihailović
- (Bosnia and Herzegovina) Esher Hadžiabdić
- (Serbia) Sead Hadžibulić
- (Serbia) Milorad Hajduković
- (Bosnia and Herzegovina) Jusmir Hatunić
- Hicman
- (Bosnia and Herzegovina) Hukić
- (Serbia) Milorad Ignjatović
- (Serbia) Svetozar Ilić
- (Serbia) Zoran Ilić
- (Serbia) Slobodan Isailović
- (Serbia) Jakovljević
- (Serbia) Dejan Jakšić
- (Serbia) Radisav Janjić
- (Serbia) Srđan Janković
- (Serbia) Željko Janković
- (Serbia) Jerinić
- (Serbia) Jolović
- (Serbia) Saša Jonović
- (Serbia) Slobodan Jovanić
- (Serbia) Jovanov
- (Serbia) B. Jovanović
- (Serbia) Ljubodrag Jovanović
- (Serbia) Milorad Jovanović
- (Serbia) Pavle Jovanović
- (Serbia) Saša Jovanović
- (Serbia) Jovanski
- Juras
- (Croatia) Zdravko Juričko
- (Serbia) Predrag Jušić
- (Serbia) Goran Kadenić
- (Bosnia and Herzegovina) Domagoj Kapetanović
- (Serbia) Karadžić
- (Serbia) Karić
- (Serbia) Mladen Katić
- (Bosnia and Herzegovina) Dušan Kerkez
- (Serbia) Slobodan Keserović
- (Serbia) Miroslav Kijanović
- (Serbia) Klajić
- (Serbia) Milorad Kleščić
- (Serbia) Dejan Knežević
- (Serbia) Marko Knežević
- (Croatia) Milan Kobe
- (North Macedonia) Vasil Kocev
- (Serbia) Jadranko Kodžo
- (Serbia) Kojić
- (Serbia) Konstantinović
- (Croatia) Ivan Konjević
- (Serbia) Korać
- (Serbia) Dušan Korica
- (Serbia) Đorđe Koruga
- (Serbia) Branislav Kovač
- (Serbia) Miroslav Kovačević
- (Serbia) Nedeljko Kovačević
- Kozlovski
- Ahmed Krajišnik
- Kraka
- (Croatia) Branko Kralj
- (Serbia) Zoran Kraljević
- (Serbia) Miroslav Krndija
- (Serbia) Jovan Krneta
- (Croatia) Jozo Krnić
- (Serbia) Krnjavac
- (Serbia) Vladan Krsmanović
- (Serbia) Dragić Krstić
- (Serbia) Lazar Krstić
- (Serbia) Slaviša Krstić
- (Argentina) Leandro Kuszko
- (Serbia) Jevđenije Kušić
- (Serbia) Goran Kuzmanović
- (Serbia) Vinko Kužet
- (Serbia) Mirko Labus
- (Serbia) Adolf Lambi
- (Serbia) Vladimir Lapčević
- (Serbia) O. Lazić
- (Bosnia and Herzegovina) Nemanja Lekanić
- (Serbia) Lekić
- (Georgia (country)) Apollon Lemondzhava
- Lendar
- (Trinidad and Tobago) Darin Lewis
- (Serbia) Željko Lilić
- (North Macedonia) Lazo Liposki
- (Serbia) Izet Ljejić
- (Serbia) Ljubenović
- (Serbia) Matija Ljujić
- (Serbia) Nikica Lopičić
- (Serbia) Lovrić
- (Brazil) Luizão
- (Serbia) Nedeljko Lukač
- (Serbia) Aco Lukić
- (Serbia) Nenad Lukić
- (Serbia) Živko Lukić
- (Croatia) Majer
- (Serbia) Borislav Majkić
- (Serbia) Luka Malešev
- (Serbia) Nikola Mandić
- Mar
- (Serbia) Marčetić
- (Serbia) Baja Marić
- (Bosnia and Herzegovina) Enver Marić
- (Serbia) Ljubomir Marić
- (Serbia) Borko Marinković
- (Serbia) Bora Marković
- (Serbia) Branislav Marković
- (Serbia) Filip Marković
- (Serbia) Ilija Marković
- (Bosnia and Herzegovina) Marko Marković
- (Serbia) Nebojša Marković
- (Serbia) Nenad Marković
- (Serbia) Marko Marović
- (Serbia) Dušan Martinović
- (Serbia) Stracimir Martinović
- (Serbia) Vladimir Martinović
- (Nigeria) Oladipupo Martins
- (Serbia) Matković
- (Serbia) Dušan Mićić
- (Serbia) Branko Mihajlović
- (Serbia) Petar Mihajlović
- (Serbia) Milovan Mihić
- (Serbia) Andrija Mijailović
- (Serbia) Mijatov
- (Serbia) Ljubiša Milačić
- (Croatia) Ivica Milaković
- (Serbia) Milan Milanović
- (Serbia) Milivojević
- (Serbia) Stefan Milojević
- (Serbia) Vladimir Milosavljević
- (Serbia) Boris Milošević
- (Serbia) Branislav Milošević
- (Serbia) Radoslav Milošević
- (Serbia) Nemanja Milovanović
- (Serbia) Slobodan Milovanović
- (Serbia) Stefan Milovanović
- (Serbia) Branko Mirjačić
- (Serbia) Nemanja Mirković
- (Serbia) Dragan Mišić
- (Serbia) Rajko Mitić
- (Serbia) Tomislav Mitić
- (Serbia) Aleksandar Mitrović
- (Serbia) Boris Mitrović
- (Serbia) Dimitrije Mitrović
- (Serbia) Filip Mitrović
- (Serbia) Stefan Mitrović
- (Serbia) Rade Mojović
- (Croatia) Franjo Monsider
- (Spain) Antonio Moreno
- Mornar
- (Croatia) Možgon
- (Bosnia and Herzegovina) Ivan Mršić
- (Serbia) Igor Mudrinić
- (Bosnia and Herzegovina) Fikret Mujkić
- (Bosnia and Herzegovina) Mirsad Musić
- (Serbia) Mutibarić
- (Democratic Republic of the Congo) Andréa Mbuyi-Mutombo
- (Serbia) Milenko Nakić
- (Serbia) Slavko Narančić
- (Serbia) Matija Nastasić
- (Serbia) Nedeljković
- (Serbia) Nenadić
- (Serbia) Bojan Neziri
- (Serbia) Dragoljub Nikolić
- (Serbia) Dragomir Nikolić
- (Serbia) Miloš Nikolić
- (North Macedonia) Vančo Nikolovski
- (Finland) Jari Niinimäki
- (Serbia) Ninković
- (Serbia) Nišanđinski
- (Serbia) Norčić
- (Serbia) Novaković
- (Nigeria) Michael Nzekwe
- (Serbia) Tihomir Ognjanov
- (Serbia) Okanović
- (Serbia) Goran Olarević
- (Serbia) Slobodan Olarević
- (Serbia) Zoran Olarević
- (Serbia) Olužina
- (Nigeria) Peter Omoduemuke
- (Bosnia and Herzegovina) Amer Osmanagić
- (Serbia) Vladan Ostojić
- (Serbia) Bogdan Pantelić
- (Croatia) Zlatko Papec
- Papeš
- (Serbia) Slaviša Pavić
- (Serbia) Uroš Pavićević
- (Serbia) Pavkov
- (Serbia) Predrag Pavlović
- (Serbia) Nemanja Pavlović
- (North Macedonia) Nebojša Pavlovski
- (Croatia) Franjo Pazmanj
- (Serbia) Milan Perendija
- (Latvia) Andrejs Perepļotkins
- (Serbia) Miloš Perišić
- (Serbia) Duško Perović
- (Serbia) Radivoje Perović
- (Serbia) Dušan Petković
- (Serbia) Goran Petković
- (Serbia) Milan Petković
- (Serbia) Matija Petrović
- (Serbia) Milan Petrović
- (Serbia) Saša Petrović
- (Serbia) Danilo Pilica
- (Serbia) Zoran Piljak
- (Croatia) Tomislav Pitner
- (Serbia) Milojko Pivljaković
- (Serbia) Plećević
- (Serbia) Emir Plojović
- (Serbia) Milan Pojužina
- (Bosnia and Herzegovina) Nikola Popara
- (Serbia) Jovan Popov
- Alojz Popović
- (Serbia) Mirko Popovski
- (Serbia) Dušan Potkonjak
- (Serbia) Premović
- (Serbia) Miodrag Prlinčević
- (Serbia) Dražen Prša
- (Serbia) Petar Puača
- (Serbia) Dragan Radaković
- (Serbia) Dušan Radaković
- (Serbia) Vanja Radinović
- (Serbia) Aleksandar Radivojević
- (Serbia) Radovanov
- (Serbia) Mijodrag Radović
- (Montenegro) Filip Raičević
- (Serbia) Nebojša Rajačić
- (Serbia) Rajić – Guest
- (Serbia) Rajkov
- (Serbia) Zoran Rakas
- (Serbia) Darko Ramovš
- (North Macedonia) Predrag Ranđelović
- (Serbia) Miroslav Ranković
- (Serbia) Zoran Rendulić
- (Serbia) Relić
- (Serbia) Ristanović
- (Serbia) Dragan Ristić
- (Serbia) Nikola Ristić
- (Serbia) Goran Ristović
- (Serbia) Zoran Ristović
- (Serbia) Bane Rnić
- (Serbia) Petar Rodić
- (Croatia) Marin Romić – Guest
- (Argentina) Gaston Rossi
- (Serbia) Dragoslav Rudić
- (Serbia) Aleksandar Ružičić
- (Cameroon) Claude Rygan
- (Burkina Faso) Dramane Salou
- (Bosnia and Herzegovina) Danijel Savić
- (Serbia) Milan Savić
- (Serbia) Stefan Savić
- (Serbia) Dragomir Sedlarević
- (Albania) Elbrus Sejdiu
- (Albania) Rahim Sherifi
- (Serbia) Jovo Simanić
- (Serbia) Simić
- (Serbia) Nebojša Sitarica
- (Serbia) Dragan Skenderija
- (Croatia) Josip Skoblar
- (Bosnia and Herzegovina) Vladimir Sladojević
- (North Macedonia) Branko Smileski
- (Serbia) Branko Smiljanić
- (Serbia) Dejan Smiljanić
- (Serbia) Zoran Smiljanić
- (Serbia) Dragan Spasić
- (Serbia) Milutin Spasić
- (Serbia) Petar Spremić
- (Serbia) Ljubomir Srđanov
- (Serbia) Petar Stakić
- (Serbia) Petar Stamenić
- (Serbia) Radivoje Stamenković
- Stamenov – Guest
- (Serbia) Stamenović – Guest
- (Serbia) Filip Stanisavljević
- (Serbia) Milan Stanisavljević
- (Serbia) Dejan Stanković
- (Serbia) Mileta Stanković
- (Serbia) Starčević – Guest
- (Serbia) Miodrag Stefanović – Guest
- (Serbia) Stešević – Guest
- (Lithuania) Artūras Steško – Guest
- (Lithuania) Igoris Steško – Guest
- (Serbia) Dragan Stevanović
- (Serbia) Momčilo Stjepanović
- (Serbia) Stoisavljević – Guest
- (Serbia) Miodrag Stojaković
- (Serbia) Steva Stojanac
- (Serbia) Dušan Stojanović
- (Serbia) Jovan Stojanović – Guest
- (Serbia) Dejan Stojić
- (Serbia) Milanko Stojić
- (Serbia) Sava Stojiljković
- (Serbia) Nemanja Stojković
- (Serbia) Nebojša Stojmenović
- (Serbia) Miroslav Stojnić
- (Serbia) Vladica Stolić
- (Hungary) Tibor Szabó
- (Serbia) Miloš Šaka
- (Serbia) Branko Šarenac
- Šebalj
- (Serbia) Vladan Šerić
- (Serbia) Vladimir Šević
- (Montenegro) Mišo Šijačić
- (Serbia) Špirić – Guest
- (Serbia) Dragan Šteković
- (Bosnia and Herzegovina) Borivoje Šuljagić
- (Serbia) Šutić
- (Croatia) Ivan Švaljek
- (Croatia) Artur Takač
- (Serbia) Silvester Takač – Guest
- (Serbia) Milan Tanasijević
- (Serbia) Dejan Tasić
- (Serbia) Boris Teoharević
- (Serbia) Zoran Tešović
- (Moldova) Valeriu Tiron
- (Italy) Filippo Tiscione
- (Serbia) Stevo Tomašević
- (Montenegro) Žarko Tomašević
- (Serbia) Jovan Tomić
- Tot
- (Serbia) Dražen Tovilović
- (Serbia) Dušan Trbojević
- (Serbia) Blažimir Trifunović
- (Serbia) Veljko Trifunović
- (Serbia) Ljubiša Tumbaković
- (Serbia) Dejan Urumov
- (Slovenia) Vajda
- (Serbia) Varađanin
- (Serbia) Đorđe Vasić
- (Serbia) Darko Vasiljević
- (Serbia) Velić
- (Serbia) Milan Velinov
- (Serbia) Zoran Veseličić
- Vibra
- (Serbia) Dragan Vidović
- (Croatia) Viđak
- (Serbia) Viktorović
- (Serbia) Vitković
- (Serbia) Dragoslav Vitorović
- (Serbia) Miodrag Vitorović
- (Bosnia and Herzegovina) Franjo Vladić – Guest
- Vogrinc
- (Serbia) Zoran Vranković
- (Serbia) Jovan Vratan
- (Montenegro) Jovan Vučinić
- (Serbia) Miroslav Vučinić
- (Serbia) Bojan Vučković
- (Serbia) Zoran Vučković
- (Montenegro) Dušan Vujačić
- (Serbia) Zoran Vujičić
- (Serbia) Vujković
- (Serbia) Vujović – Guest
- (Serbia) Zoran Vujović
- (Montenegro) Zoran Vukčević
- (Serbia) Draško Vukosavljević
- (Serbia) Marko Vuković
- (Serbia) Živomir Vulović
- (Hong Kong) Wellingsson de Souza
- (Serbia) Đorđe Zafirović
- Zagorac
- Zagorščak
- (Serbia) Miodrag Zavišić
- (Serbia) Zečević
- (Croatia) Zoran Zekić
- (Montenegro) Srđan Zindović
- (Serbia) Milan Zivlak
- (North Macedonia) Zlatanoski – Guest
- (Serbia) Zlatković
- (Montenegro) Igor Zonjić
- Žarak
- (Croatia) Žigman
- (Serbia) Aleksandar Živaljević – Guest
- (Serbia) Mladen Živaljević
- (Serbia) Živančević
- (Serbia) Marko Živanović
- (Serbia) Miloš Živanović
- Živkov
- (Serbia) Rajko Živković
- Žuljević

== The Best Eleven ==
In 1995, Partizan celebrated half a century of its existence. Partizanov vesnik, official fan magazine, organized a massive poll in order to choose the best player and the best team in club's history, called Magnificent Eleven. The players chosen in the poll were:

Goalkeeper

- (Socialist Federal Republic of Yugoslavia) Milutin Šoškić (5.910 votes)

Defenders

- (Socialist Federal Republic of Yugoslavia) Bruno Belin (5.958)
- (Socialist Federal Republic of Yugoslavia) Velibor Vasović (5.496)
- (Socialist Federal Republic of Yugoslavia) Branko Zebec (5.218)
- (Socialist Federal Republic of Yugoslavia) Fahrudin Jusufi (4.300)

Midfielders

- (Socialist Federal Republic of Yugoslavia) Zlatko Čajkovski (5.244)
- (Socialist Federal Republic of Yugoslavia) / (Federal Republic of Yugoslavia) Predrag Mijatović (4.946)
- (Socialist Federal Republic of Yugoslavia) Miloš Milutinović (4.728)
- (Socialist Federal Republic of Yugoslavia) Momčilo Vukotić (4.558)

Forwards

- (Socialist Federal Republic of Yugoslavia) Stjepan Bobek (6.272)
- (Socialist Federal Republic of Yugoslavia) Milan Galić (5.058)

== Notes ==
The players that played during Yugoslav period have represented the flag that would correspond to the current countries, that were the correspondent Yugoslav republics back then.

== See also ==
- List of Red Star Belgrade footballers
- List of FK Vojvodina players

== External sources ==
- List of all-time players from Partizan official website
