= 1946–47 FK Partizan season =

Partizan
1946–47 season
- Head coach: Illés Spitz
- Yugoslav First League: Winners
- Top goalscorer: League: All: Stjepan Bobek

The 1946–47 season was the first season in FK Partizan's existence. This article shows player statistics and matches that the club played during the 1946–47 season.

== Players ==
=== Squad information ===
(league matches/league goals)

Stjepan Bobek (23/24)
Miroslav Brozović (23/2)
Béla Pálfi (21/4)
Zlatko Čajkovski (20/3)
Kiril Simonovski (19/5)
Franjo Rupnik (18/11)
Prvoslav Mihajlović (18/9)
Aleksandar Atanacković (17/3)
Milivoje Đurđević (17/0)
Franjo Glazer (16/0) (goalkeeper)
Stanislav Popesku (13/0)
Miodrag Jovanović (13/0)
Silvester Šereš (12/2)
Florijan Matekalo (7/3)
Jane Janevski (6/1)
Risto Nikolić (6/0) (goalkeeper)
Vladimir Firm (4/3)
Momčilo Radunović (4/0)
Ratko Čolić (2/0)
Stevan Jakuš (2/0)
Franjo Šoštarić (2/0) (goalkeeper)
Šepe Šutevski (1/0)

== Friendlies ==
=== Friendly matches in 1945–46. ===
6 October 1945 Friendly	Partizan (Socialist Federal Republic of Yugoslavia)	4–2	(Socialist Federal Republic of Yugoslavia) Zemun	Belgrade
15:30	Matekalo; Šereš; Rupnik			Attendance: 200

28 October 1945 Friendly	Slovak Army (Czechoslovakia)	1–3	(Socialist Federal Republic of Yugoslavia) Partizan	Banská Bystrica, Czechoslovakia
	Palfi; Simonovski

30 October 1945 Friendly	Banská Bystrica (Czechoslovakia)	1–4	(Socialist Federal Republic of Yugoslavia) Partizan	Banská Bystrica, Czechoslovakia
			Matekalo; Bobek; Pálfi

6 December 1945 Friendly	Partizan (Socialist Federal Republic of Yugoslavia)	3–4	(Soviet Union) CSKA Moscow	Belgrade
	Bobek 25'; Matekalo 42', 89'		Čajkovski 3' (o.g.); Fedotov 18', 56'; Nikolayev	Attendance: 25,000

24 March 1946 Friendly	Dinamo Zagreb (Socialist Federal Republic of Yugoslavia)	1–0	(Socialist Federal Republic of Yugoslavia) Partizan	Zagreb
	Reberski 21'			Stadium: Stadion u Kranjčevićevoj ulici Attendance: 16,000

21 April 1946 Friendly	Partizan (Socialist Federal Republic of Yugoslavia)	2–0	(Socialist Federal Republic of Yugoslavia) Crvena zvezda	Belgrade
	Rupnik 34'; Mihajlović 59'

12 May 1946 Friendly	Partizan (Socialist Federal Republic of Yugoslavia)	3–1	(Socialist Federal Republic of Yugoslavia) Hajduk Split	Belgrade
	Atanacković 8'; Rupnik 66', 70'		Broketa 52'	Attendance: 20,000; Referee: Lemešić

20 June 1946 Friendly	Katowice (Poland)	0–8	(Socialist Federal Republic of Yugoslavia) Partizan	Katowice, Poland
				Attendance: 20,000

23 June 1946 Friendly	Cracovia (Poland)	3–4	(Socialist Federal Republic of Yugoslavia) Partizan	Kraków, Poland
				Attendance: 30,000

29 June 1946 Friendly	Cracovia (Poland)	1–5	(Socialist Federal Republic of Yugoslavia) Partizan	Warsaw, Poland

1 July 1946 Friendly	Legia Warsaw (Poland)	2–8	(Socialist Federal Republic of Yugoslavia) Partizan	Warsaw, Poland

5 July 1946 Friendly	ŁKS Łódź (Poland)	0–6	(Socialist Federal Republic of Yugoslavia) Partizan	Łódź, Poland

28 July 1946 Friendly	CSKA Moscow (Soviet Union)	1–0	(Socialist Federal Republic of Yugoslavia) Partizan	Moscow, Soviet Union
	Grinin 31'			Attendance: 100,000

1 August 1946 Friendly	Leningrad (Soviet Union)	1–2	(Socialist Federal Republic of Yugoslavia) Partizan	Leningrad, Soviet Union
			Rupnik; Mitić

6 August 1946 Friendly	Dynamo Moscow (Soviet Union)	4–1	(Socialist Federal Republic of Yugoslavia) Partizan	Moscow, Soviet Union
			Rupnik

11 August 1946 Friendly	Dinamo Tbilisi (Soviet Union)	1–2	(Socialist Federal Republic of Yugoslavia) Partizan	Tbilisi, Soviet Union
	25' (pen.)		Mitić 34'; Rupnik 52'	Attendance: 45,000

== Competitions ==
=== Yugoslav First League ===
Pos	Team	Pld	W	D	L	GF	GA	GD	Pts
1	Partizan (C)	26	23	1	2	77	17	+60	47
2	Dinamo Zagreb	26	19	4	3	81	26	+55	42
3	Red Star Belgrade	26	18	2	6	66	23	+43	38
4	Hajduk Split	26	16	4	6	57	21	+36	36
5	Metalac Belgrade	26	13	3	10	40	35	+5	29

Source: RSSSF
(C) Champions

==== Matches ====
28 August 1946 1	Partizan	1–0	Pobeda Skopje	Belgrade
	Matekalo			Attendance: 15,000

1 September 1946 2	Partizan	6–1	Budućnost Titograd	Belgrade
	Čajkovski 3'; Rupnik 10', 16'; Bobek 37', 63'; Simonovski 60'		Božović 84'	Attendance: 20,000; Referee: Miloš Belesin

8 September 1946 3	Partizan	2–1	Metalac Belgrade	Belgrade
	Rupnik 17'; Mihajlović 33'		Živković	Attendance: 15,000; Referee: Miljenko Podubsky

15 September 1946 4	Partizan	5–1	14. Oktobar Niš	Belgrade
	Bobek; Rupnik; Pálfi (pen.)		Petrović (pen.)	Attendance: 5,000; Referee: Viktor Šter

22 September 1946 5	Nafta Lendava	0–2	Partizan	Lendava
			Rupnik 1'; Bobek 80'	Attendance: 1,500

27 October 1946 6	Partizan	5–1	Dinamo Zagreb	Belgrade
	Bobek; Mihajlović; Pálfi		Wölfl	Attendance: 8,000; Referee: Miljenko Podubsky

3 November 1946 7	Kvarner	0–3	Partizan	Rijeka
			Simonovski; Pálfi; Atanacković	Attendance: 7,000; Referee: Josip Mikulan

7 November 1946 8	Partizan	1–0	Spartak Subotica	Belgrade
	Mihajlović			Attendance: 3,000; Referee: Branko Lalić

1 December 1946 9	Hajduk Split	0–1	Partizan	Split
			Mihajlović 76'	Attendance: 14,000; Referee: Miljenko Podupski

15 December 1946 10	Partizan	2–0	Ponziana Trieste	Ljubljana*
			Rupnik 15'; Pálfi 35'	Attendance: 3,000; Referee: Emil Erlih

26 December 1946 11	Partizan	3–0	Željezničar	Belgrade
		Match Awarded

5 January 1947 12	Partizan	3–4	Crvena zvezda	Belgrade
	Đajić 72' (o.g.); Kašanin 83' (o.g.); Bobek 85'		Jezerkić 12', 25', 54'; Đajić 77'	Attendance: 4,000; Referee: Branko Lalić

16 February 1947 13	Lokomotiva Zagreb	1–1	Partizan	Zagreb
	Žigman 78'		Matekalo 85'	Attendance: 12,000

23 February 1947 14	Željezničar	0–4	Partizan	Sarajevo
			Simonovski 16', 73'; Janevski 44'; Rupnik 59'	Attendance: 4,000

2 March 1947 15	Budućnost Titograd	0–3	Partizan	Titograd
			Brozović 16', 43'; Rupnik 24'	Attendance: 6,000; Referee: Voja Jovanović

9 March 1947 16	Ponziana Trieste	1–2	Partizan	Trieste
	63'		Čajkovski 11'; Mihajlović 13'	Attendance: 10,000; Referee: Višnjić

16 March 1947 17	Metalac Belgrade	0–2	Partizan	Belgrade
			Rupnik 35'; Bobek 84'	Attendance: Josip Mikulan; Referee: 12,000

23 March 1947 18	Pobeda Skopje	2–3	Partizan	Skopje
	14'; 19'		Bobek 34', 61'; Rupnik 70'	Attendance: 10,000; Referee: Nikola Melokić

30 March 1947 19	Dinamo Zagreb	4–2	Partizan	Zagreb
	Strugar 17', 53'; Pleše 24'; Wölfl 58'		Šereš 85'; Bobek 88', pen.'	Attendance: 17,000; Referee: Leo Lemešić

13 April 1947 20	Partizan	4–0	Lokomotiva Zagreb	Belgrade
	Rupnik 29', 77'; Simonovski 32'; Bobek 89'			Attendance: 8,000; Referee: Nikola Milošević

20 April 1947 21	Partizan	2–0	Hajduk Split	Belgrade
	Bobek 63', 83'			Attendance: 25,000; Referee: Dragoslav Rakić

27 April 1947 22	Crvena zvezda	0–1	Partizan	Belgrade
			Stanković 63' (o.g.)	Attendance: 30,000; Referee: Franjo Petrić

18 May 1947 23	Partizan	5–0	Kvarner	Belgrade
	Firm 1', 28', 38'; Bobek 7', 20'			Attendance: 6,500; Referee: Moni Kario

8 June 1947 24	14. Oktobar Niš	1–10	Partizan	Niš
	Petrović 5'		Bobek 21', 28', 38', 50', 66', 68', 80', 87'; Mihajlović 30'; Simonovski 71'	Attendance: 8,000

6 July 1947 25	Spartak Subotica	0–1	Partizan	Subotica
			Mihajlović 29'	Attendance: 8,000

13 July 1947 26	Partizan	3–0	Nafta Lendava	Belgrade
		Match Awarded

== See also ==
- List of FK Partizan seasons
