= Banduka =

Banduka (Serbian Cyrillic: Бандука) is a Serbian surname. It is traditionally found in the Orthodox protopresbyteriate of Sarajevo (of the Metropolitanate of Dabar-Bosna). According to Đ. Janjatović, in 1882, families with the slava (patron saint) of St. George were present in the Osijek-Blažuj and Pazarić parishes, while those with the slava of St. Stefan Dečanski were present in Osijek-Blažuj parish and the Sarajevo city. It may refer to:

- Andrej Banduka, Serbian rugby player
- Slavko Banduka (1947–1992), Yugoslav Serbian footballer
- Rajko Banduka, war-time secretary, and defense witness of Ratko Mladic.
