= 1958–59 FK Partizan season =

Partizan
1958–59 season
- President: Martin Dasović
- Head coach: Illés Spitz
- Yugoslav First League: Runners-up
- Yugoslav Cup: Runners-up
- Top goalscorer: League: All: Branislav Mihajlović

The 1958–59 season was the 13th season in FK Partizan's existence. This article shows player statistics and matches that the club played during the 1958–59 season.

== Players ==
=== First 11 ===
Šoškić, Kranjčić, Jusufi, Belin, Jončić, Miladinović, Z. Čebinac, Kaloperović, Vukelić, Galić, B. Mihajlović.

=== Other players who played during the season ===
Stojanović, Pajević, S. Čebinac, Blažić, Vasović, Mitić, Kovačević, Radović, Sombolac, Vislavski, Pajković, Srbu.

== Friendlies ==
24 August 1958 Friendly	Partizan (Socialist Federal Republic of Yugoslavia)	5–3	(Hungary) Budapest Honvéd	Belgrade
	Mihajlović; Blažić; Kaloperović (pen.)			Stadium: JNA Stadium; Attendance: 24,000

25 December 1958 Friendly	Anderlecht (Belgium)	3–1	(Socialist Federal Republic of Yugoslavia) Partizan	Brussels, Belgium
			Galić

28 December 1958 Friendly	Eintracht Braunschweig (West Germany)	1–5	(Socialist Federal Republic of Yugoslavia) Partizan	Braunschweig, West Germany
			Belin 42'; Kaloperović 46', 85'; Vukelić 71', 77'

1 January 1959 Friendly	1. FC Nürnberg (West Germany)	1–3	(Socialist Federal Republic of Yugoslavia) Partizan	Nürnberg, West Germany

4 January 1959 Friendly	Kickers Offenbach (West Germany)	2–2	(Socialist Federal Republic of Yugoslavia) Partizan	Offenbach am Main, West Germany
				Attendance: 7,000

25 February 1959 Friendly	Partizan (Socialist Federal Republic of Yugoslavia)	5–5	(Poland) Legia Warsaw	Belgrade
	Valok 1'; Kaloperović 52', 85' (pen.), 89'; Mihajlović 77'			Stadium: JNA Stadium; Attendance: 20,000

1 March 1959 Friendly	Genoa (Italy)	4–2	(Socialist Federal Republic of Yugoslavia) Partizan	Genoa, Italy
				Stadium: Stadio Luigi Ferraris

2 July 1959 Friendly	Partizan (Socialist Federal Republic of Yugoslavia)	1–1	(Hungary) Ferencváros	Belgrade
	Radović 23'		Rákosi	Stadium: JNA Stadium; Attendance: 20,000

== Competitions ==
=== Yugoslav First League ===
Pos	Team	Pld	W	D	L	GF	GA	GD	Pts	Qualification or relegation
1	Red Star Belgrade (C)	22	14	3	5	50	19	+31	31	Qualification for European Cup preliminary round
2	Partizan	22	14	3	5	39	29	+10	31	
3	Vojvodina	22	13	4	5	47	22	+25	30	
4	Radnički Beograd	22	9	4	9	35	27	+8	22	
5	Dinamo Zagreb	22	9	4	9	35	28	+7	22	

Source: rsssf.org
Rules for classification: 1) points; 2) goal difference; 3) number of goals scored.
(C) Champions

31 August 1958 1	Vojvodina	2–0	Partizan	Novi Sad
				Attendance: 18,000

7 September 1958 2	Vardar	0–0	Partizan	Skopje
				Attendance: 20,000

20 September 1958 3	Partizan	2–1	Rijeka	Belgrade
	Kaloperović 12'; Zebec 70'			Stadium: JNA Stadium; Attendance: 15,000; Referee: Tesladžić (Sarajevo)

28 September 1958 4	Sarajevo	1–0	Partizan	Sarajevo
				Attendance: 14,000

11 October 1958 5	Partizan	5–3	Budućnost	Belgrade
	Vukelić 32'; Zebec 52'; Mihajlović 58', 82'; S. Čebinac 62'			Stadium: JNA Stadium; Attendance: 8,000; Referee: Ivanovski (Skopje)

19 October 1958 6	Velež	6–2	Partizan	Mostar
			Mihajlović 63', 87'	Attendance: 8,000

26 October 1958 7	Partizan	0–2	Crvena zvezda	Belgrade
			Kostić 51', 67'	Stadium: JNA Stadium; Attendance: 50,000

2 November 1958 8	Hajduk Split	0–1	Partizan	Split
			Miladinović 35'	Stadium: Stadion Stari plac Attendance: 13,000

9 November 1958 9	Partizan	4–2	Željezničar	Belgrade
	Rede 1'; Valok 24', 57'; Mitić 63' (pen.)			Stadium: JNA Stadium; Attendance: 8,000

16 November 1958 10	Dinamo Zagreb	4–1	Partizan	Zagreb
	Jerković; Lipošinović; Šantek; Čonč		Rede 9'	Stadium: Stadion Maksimir; Attendance: 20,000

23 November 1958 11	Partizan	1–0	Radnički Beograd	Belgrade
	S. Čebinac 46'			Stadium: JNA Stadium; Attendance: 10,000

15 March 1959 12	Partizan	2–0	Vojvodina	Belgrade
	Mihajlović 56', 75'			Stadium: JNA Stadium; Attendance: 25,000

22 March 1959 13	Partizan	2–0	Vardar	Belgrade
	Miladinović 63'; Galić 79'			Stadium: JNA Stadium; Attendance: 20,000

29 March 1959 14	Rijeka	3–3	Partizan	Rijeka
			Mihajlović 51', 75'; Miladinović 89'	Stadium: Stadion Kantrida; Attendance: 10,000

4 April 1959 15	Partizan	1–1	Sarajevo	Belgrade
	Miladinović 83'			Stadium: JNA Stadium; Attendance: 20,000

12 April 1959 16	Budućnost	0–1	Partizan	Titograd
			Mihajlović 82'	Attendance: 10,000

3 May 1959 17	Partizan	1–0	Velež	Belgrade
	Kaloperović 8' (pen.)			Stadium: JNA Stadium; Attendance: 10,000; Referee: Marek (Zagreb)

10 May 1959 18	Crvena zvezda	1–3	Partizan	Belgrade
	Maravić 41'		Miladinović 17'; Kaloperović 77'; Galić 85'	Stadium: JNA Stadium; Attendance: 50,000

17 May 1959 19	Partizan	3–1	Hajduk Split	Belgrade
	Galić 30'; Vukelić 59'; Z. Čebinac 76'			Stadium: JNA Stadium; Attendance: 25,000; Referee: Nedelkovski (Zagreb)

7 June 1959 20	Željezničar	0–1	Partizan	Sarajevo
			Galić 52'	Attendance: 20,000

14 June 1959 21	Partizan	4–1	Dinamo Zagreb	Belgrade
	Galić 1', 89'; Vukelić 6'; B. Mihajlović 42'			Stadium: JNA Stadium; Attendance: 20,000; Referee: Trajan Ivanovski (Skopje)

17 June 1959 22	Radnički Beograd	1–2	Partizan	Belgrade
			S. Čebinac 2'; Galić 61'	Attendance: 6,000

=== Yugoslav Cup ===
7 December 1958 First round	Novi Sad	2–2 (5–6 p)	Partizan	Novi Sad
			Zebec 81', 118'	Attendance: 7,000

14 December 1958 Second round	Radnički Kragujevac	1–3	Partizan	Kragujevac
			Mihajlović 25', 81'; Galić 88'	Attendance: 8,000

8 March 1959 Quarter-finals	Partizan	1–0	Garnizon JNA Borac	Belgrade
	Vukelić 14'			Stadium: JNA Stadium; Attendance: 15,000; Referee: Damjani (Zagreb)

8 April 1959 Semi-finals	Partizan	2–1	Vojvodina	Belgrade
	Galić 17'; Mihajlović 75'			Stadium: JNA Stadium; Attendance: 30,000; Referee: Borče Nedelkovski (Skoplje)

23 May 1959 Final	Crvena zvezda	3–1	Partizan	Belgrade
	Maravić 11'; Kostić 57', 71' (pen.)		Galić 62'	Stadium: JNA Stadium; Attendance: 50,000; Referee: Leo Lemešić (Split)

=== Mitropa Cup ===
==== Quarter-finals ====
5 July 1959 First leg	Baník Ostrava (Czechoslovakia)	1–1	(Socialist Federal Republic of Yugoslavia) Partizan	Ostrava, Czechoslovakia
			Vukelić 61'	Attendance: 20,000

12 July 1959 Second leg	Partizan (Socialist Federal Republic of Yugoslavia)	3–2 (4 – 3 agg.)	(Czechoslovakia) Baník Ostrava	Belgrade, Yugoslavia
	Kaloperović 80' (pen.), 102'; Miladinović 90'			Stadium: JNA Stadium; Attendance: 20,000

==== Semi-finals ====
18 July 1959 First leg	Partizan (Socialist Federal Republic of Yugoslavia)	3–3	(Hungary) Honvéd	Belgrade, Yugoslavia
19:00	Mihajlović 44'; Bozsik 49' (o.g.); Kaloperović 80' (pen.)		Tichy 1'; Bozsik 56'; Marosi 58'	Stadium: JNA Stadium; Attendance: 35,000; Referee: Jindřich Karas

26 July 1959 Second leg	Honvéd (Hungary)	2–2 (5 – 5 agg.)	(Socialist Federal Republic of Yugoslavia) Partizan	Budapest, Hungary
17:00	Tichy 21', 37'		Kotász 62' (o.g.); Galić 84'	Stadium: Bozsik Stadion; Attendance: 30,000; Referee: Fritz Seipelt

== See also ==
- List of FK Partizan seasons
