= Zoran Racić =

Serbian footballer (1954–2003)

Personal information
- Full name: Zoran Racić
- Date of birth: 18 March 1954
- Place of birth: Ivanjica, SFR Yugoslavia
- Date of death: 10 March 2003 (aged 48)
- Place of death: Belgrade, Serbia and Montenegro
- Position: Midfielder

Senior career*
Years	Team	Apps	(Gls)
1970–1973	Javor Ivanjica		
1973–1974	Partizan	13	(0)
- * Club domestic league appearances and goals

Zoran Racić (Serbian Cyrillic: Зоран Рацић) (18 March 1954 – 10 March 2003) was a Serbian footballer who played for FK Partizan.

He is perhaps best known for having his leg broken by Sloboda Tuzla player Jusuf Hatunić in October 1974. Racić never played a match again while Hatunić was later signed by Partizan.

Racić died on 10 March 2003, at the age of 48.
