= Nenad Đukanović =

Serbian footballer

Personal information
- Full name: Nenad Đukanović
- Date of birth: 9 June 1971 (age 55)
- Place of birth: Obrenovac, SFR Yugoslavia
- Height: 1.78 m (5 ft 10 in)
- Position: Midfielder

Senior career*
Years	Team	Apps	(Gls)
1989–1990	GOŠK-Jug	32	(2)
1990–1991	Sutjeska Nikšić	20	(3)
1991–1993	Radnički Beograd	10	(2)
1994–1996	Čukarički	59	(1)
1996–1997	Partizan	12	(0)
1998–1999	Hércules	44	(1)
2000	Čukarički	18	(1)
2001	Železnik	11	(0)
2001–2002	Čukarički	36	(4)
2003–2004	Rad	44	(3)
2004	Hajduk Kula	14	(1)
2005–2006	ČSK Čelarevo	47	(7)
2006–2007	Jedinstvo Ub	14	(2)
Total		361	(27)
- * Club domestic league appearances and goals

Nenad Đukanović (Serbian Cyrillic: Ненад Ђукановић; born 9 June 1971) is a Serbian retired footballer who played as a midfielder.

== Career ==
In his early career, Đukanović played in the Yugoslav Second League for GOŠK-Jug (1989–90), Sutjeska Nikšić (1990–91), and Radnički Beograd (1991–92). He later played for Čukarički in the First League of FR Yugoslavia.

In the summer of 1996, Đukanović signed for Partizan. He won the league title in his debut season with the club. In the 1998 winter transfer window, Đukanović moved abroad to Spain and joined Segunda División club Hércules.

In early 2000, Đukanović returned to FR Yugoslavia and rejoined Čukarički. He later briefly played for Železnik, before returning to Čukarički. In the 2003 winter transfer window, Đukanović moved to city rivals Rad, but failed to help them avoid relegation.

== Honours ==
Partizan

- First League of FR Yugoslavia: 1996–97
