= Todor Grujić =

Serbian footballer (born 1946)

Todor Grujić Тодор Грујић
Personal information
- Full name: Todor Grujić
- Date of birth: 10 March 1946 (age 80)
- Place of birth: Belgrade, Serbia, Yugoslavia
- Position: Defender

Youth career
- –1964: OFK Beograd

Senior career*
Years	Team	Apps	(Gls)
1965–1969	OFK Beograd		
1969–1971	VfL Osnabrück	4	(0)
1971–1973	TuS Haste 01		
1973–1977	Eintracht Nordhorn		
- * Club domestic league appearances and goals

Todor Grujić (Serbian Cyrillic: Тодор Грујић; born 10 March 1946) is a retired Serbian footballer. He played for OFK Beograd throughout the 1960s as well as playing for various German clubs throughout the 1970s as a defender.

== Career ==
Grujić began his career with OFK Beograd during the 1965–66 Yugoslav First League at the tail end of one of the strongest eras for the club where he played alongside Bratislav Đorđević, Rodoljub Milovanović, Stojan Vukašinović, Blagoje Krivokuća, Zoran Dakić, Spasoje Samardžić, Dragan Gugleta, Slobodan Santrač, Sreten Banović and Josip Skoblar. He was also part of the winning squad that won the 1965–66 Yugoslav Cup as well as playing in the 1966–67 European Cup Winners' Cup as a result of the club's success. However, the club would experience a subsequent slump in performance in the latter half of the decade. Seeing a declining number of opportunities within his native Yugoslavia, he decided to play abroad in Germany for VfL Osnabrück for their 1969–70 season. During his inaugural season with the club, he experienced great success with them as the club would finish 1st in the Regionalliga Nord and qualified for the promotion playoffs. However, this initial success would damper with the Lila-Weißen finishing dead-last in their group with Arminia Bielefeld being promoted instead. The following 1970–71 Regionalliga would see slightly better results with the club narrowly missing promotion to the Bundesliga in favor for VfL Bochum. He decided to remain in Germany through his service with TuS Haste 01, he played for Amateurliga club Eintracht Nordhorn. Initially, the club would not find much success, due to the club signing four foreign players instead of the required three, which docked them points from the championship. However, the 1974–75 season saw the club successfully promoted for the 1975–76 Oberliga as well as making their debuts in the DFB-Pokal that season. Grujić retired in the following season with the club only reaching 9th place in his final season.
