= Petar Čestić =

Serbian footballer

Petar Čestić Петар Честић
Personal information
- Full name: Petar Čestić
- Date of birth: 1 February 1974 (age 52)
- Place of birth: Belgrade, SFR Yugoslavia
- Height: 1.85 m (6 ft 1 in)
- Position: Defender

Youth career
- Partizan

Senior career*
Years	Team	Apps	(Gls)
1993–1995	Partizan	0	(0)
1995–1996	FC Antwerp	4	(1)
1996–1999	Zemun	20	(0)
1999–2000	Beijing Guoan		
2000–2001	Bnei Yehuda	31	(0)
2001–2002	Adelaide City Force	5	(0)
2002	Big Bull Bačinci		
2003	Rad	3	(0)
- * Club domestic league appearances and goals

Petar Čestić (Serbian Cyrillic: Петар Честић; born 1 February 1974) is a Serbian retired footballer.

Born in Belgrade, Serbian and Yugoslav capital, during his career he played with Serbian clubs FK Partizan, FK Zemun, FK Big Bull Bačinci and FK Rad, Belgian FC Antwerp, Chinese Beijing Guoan, Israeli Bnei Yehuda and Aussie Adelaide City Force.
