= Nemanja Pavlović =

Serbian footballer

Personal information
- Full name: Nemanja Pavlović
- Date of birth: 18 September 1977 (age 49)
- Place of birth: Sarajevo, SFR Yugoslavia
- Height: 1.88 m (6 ft 2 in)
- Position: Defender

Senior career*
Years	Team	Apps	(Gls)
2001–2002	Teleoptik	22	(0)
2002–2006	Budućnost Banatski Dvor	98	(3)
2006–2007	Banat Zrenjanin	13	(0)
2007–2008	Modriča	6	(0)
2008–2010	Sloga Kraljevo	50	(2)
2010–2011	BASK	4	(0)
Total		193	(5)

International career
- FR Yugoslavia U21
- * Club domestic league appearances and goals

Nemanja Pavlović (Serbian Cyrillic: Немања Павловић; born September 18, 1977) is a Serbian footballer.

He had played with Serbian clubs FK Teleoptik, top league FK Budućnost Banatski Dvor, that in 2006 became FK Banat Zrenjanin, and Bosnian Premier League club FK Modriča. Since 2008 he has been playing with FK Sloga Kraljevo in the Serbian First League, but in summer 2010 he has moved to another same league club, the more ambitious FK BASK.
