= Zvonko Canjuga =

Croatian footballer

Personal information
- Full name: Zvonko Canjuga
- Date of birth: 1921
- Place of birth: Bjelovar, Kingdom of Yugoslavia
- Position: Forward

Youth career
- –1941: Građanski Zagreb

Senior career*
Years	Team	Apps	(Gls)
1941–1945	Građanski Zagreb	6	(0)
1947–1948	Partizan	1	(0)
1948–1949	Metalac Zagreb		
1950–1956	Rijeka		(43)
- * Club domestic league appearances and goals

Zvonko Canjuga (born 1921) is a Croatian former footballer.

== Club career ==
Born in Bjelovar, he started playing in the youth teams of Građanski, and later as senior he played for HŠK Građanski Zagreb, NK Lokomotiva, FK Partizan and HNK Rijeka. He was a forward who left an important mark with Rijeka, scoring 43 goals during five seasons with the club. He was a key forward for the club in tandem with Stojan Osojnak. In 1952, he was Rijeka's top scorer.
