= Gastón Rossi =

Argentine footballer

Personal information
- Full name: Gastón Amadeo Rossi
- Date of birth: 31 January 1990 (age 36)
- Place of birth: General Villegas, Argentina
- Height: 1.72 m (5 ft 8 in)
- Position: Winger

Team information
- Current team: Sportivo Patria

Youth career
- 2004–2010: Boca Juniors

Senior career*
Years	Team	Apps	(Gls)
2010–2014	Boca Juniors	0	(0)
2011–2012	→ Chacarita Juniors (loan)	22	(1)
2012–2014	→ Patronato (loan)	35	(2)
2014–2015	Almirante Brown	42	(1)
2016–	Sportivo Patria	3	(0)
- * Club domestic league appearances and goals as of 11 March 2016

Gastón Amadeo Rossi (born 31 January 1990) is an Argentine professional footballer who plays as a winger for Sportivo Patria.

== Career ==
After coming through the youth categories of Boca Juniors, Rossi was promoted to their first team under manager Claudio Borghi. During the winter break of the 2010–11 season, Rossi spent a few weeks on trial with Serbian club Partizan, alongside his teammate Leandro Rodrigo Kuszko. In the summer of 2011, Rossi was loaned to Chacarita Juniors. In the summer of 2012, Rossi moved on loan to Patronato.
