= Leandro Kuszko =

Argentine footballer

Personal information
- Full name: Leandro Rodrigo Kuszko
- Date of birth: 6 February 1990 (age 36)
- Place of birth: Buenos Aires, Argentina
- Height: 1.75 m (5 ft 9 in)
- Position: Winger

Team information
- Current team: Platense

Youth career
- Boca Juniors

Senior career*
Years	Team	Apps	(Gls)
2010–2011	Boca Juniors	0	(0)
2012	Marcílio Dias	0	(0)
2012–2014	Huracán	6	(0)
2015–	Platense	15	(2)
- * Club domestic league appearances and goals as of 11 March 2016

Leandro Rodrigo Kuszko (born 6 February 1990) is an Argentine professional footballer who plays as a winger for Platense.

== Career ==
Born in Buenos Aires, Kuszko came through the youth categories of Boca Juniors. During the winter break of the 2010–11 season, Kuszko spent a few weeks on trial with Serbian club Partizan, alongside his teammate Gaston Amadeo Rossi, but failed to get a contract.
