= Miroslav Rede =

Croatian footballer and sports journalist

Personal information
- Full name: Miroslav Rede
- Date of birth: 20 November 1938 (age 87)
- Place of birth: Kikinda, Kingdom of Yugoslavia
- Position: Forward

Youth career
- Partizan

Senior career*
Years	Team	Apps	(Gls)
1956–1959	Partizan	9	(2)
1959–1960	Dinamo Zagreb	4	(0)
1961–1962	Radnički Beograd	10	(0)
1962–1965	Lokomotiva Zagreb	74	(8)
- * Club domestic league appearances and goals

Miroslav Rede (born 20 November 1938) is a Croatian former footballer and later sports journalist.

== Playing career ==
He started playing in one of the biggest Yugoslav clubs, Belgrade's FK Partizan. In 1959 he moved, together with his family, to Zagreb, and he started playing for another Yugoslav giants, this time NK Dinamo Zagreb. After two seasons there, he returned to Belgrade and played one year with FK Radnički Beograd before signing, in 1962, with NK Lokomotiva Zagreb where he will play the rest of his career, until 1965.

== Sports journalism ==
After retiring, in 1967, he started working as sports journalist in Zagreb's Sportske novosti as a football section editor. At same time, he becomes also the main football editor at the weekly SN Revija magazine. For one year he was the sports director of the Croatian First League club NK Inker Zaprešić, but in 1993 he returns to journalism, this time to work in the Croatian daily newspaper Večernji list where he stayed until 2002.

For his work in journalism, he received an award for his life-time work from the Croatian Association of Sports Journalists, and the special journalist award for his coverage of the 1978 FIFA World Cup.
