= Florijan Matekalo =

Personal information
- Full name: Florijan Matekalo
- Date of birth: 25 April 1920
- Place of birth: Jajce, Kingdom of Serbs, Croats and Slovenes
- Date of death: 20 May 1995 (aged 75)
- Place of death: Belgrade, Serbia, FR Yugoslavia
- Position: Midfielder

Youth career
- 1933–1936: Elektrobosna Jajce

Senior career*
Years	Team	Apps	(Gls)
1936–1939	Slavija Sarajevo	56	(19)
1939–1940	Građanski Zagreb	5	(1)
1946–1947	Partizan	7	(2)

International career
1940	Banovina of Croatia	4	(1)
1940	Yugoslavia	1	(0)

Managerial career
- 1957: Partizan
- 1962: Hajduk Split
- 1964: Partizan
- 1979: Partizan
- * Club domestic league appearances and goals

Florijan Matekalo (Croatian pronunciation: [flǒrijaːn matěːkalo]; 25 April 1920 – 20 May 1995) was a footballer who played international football for both Yugoslavia and Croatia.

He scored the first goal in the history of the Croatia national team and the first goal ever for FK Partizan.

== International career ==
Matekalo debuted for the Kingdom of Yugoslavia's national team in a November 1940 friendly match against Nazi Germany and concurrently played all four matches for the Banovina of Croatia's national team, which represented the Croatian statelet within the kingdom.
