= Jane Janevski =

Macedonian footballer and manager (born 1920)

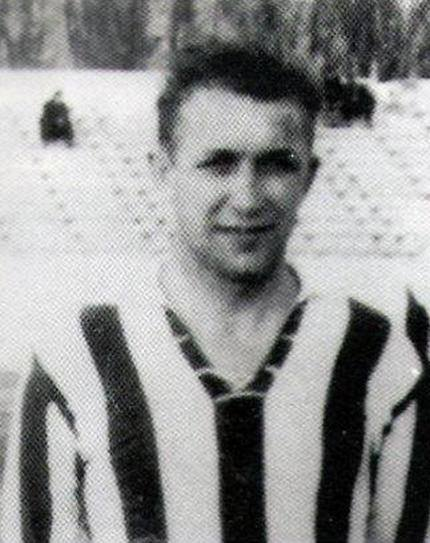

Personal information
- Full name: Jane Janevski
- Date of birth: 1 January 1920
- Place of birth: Skopje
- Position: Forward

Senior career*
Years	Team	Apps	(Gls)
1941–1943	Macedonia (Skopje)		
1946–1947	Partizan	7	(1)
1947–1955	Vardar	120	(27)

Managerial career
- 1949: Vardar (youth)
- 1955: Aris
- 1967–1968: Beşiktaş
- 1968–1969: PAOK
- 1974-1975: Panachaiki
- 1975: Pierikos
- 1976–1977: Kavala
- * Club domestic league appearances and goals

Jane Janevski (Macedonian: Јане Јаневски; born 1 January 1920) is a Macedonian football manager and former player.

== Playing career ==
During the Second World War Janevski played for Macedonia (Skopje) based on FK Vardar. In 1942 he played in a friendly match against Germany (0:3).

Janevski played with FK Partizan immediately after the end of Second World War. With Partizan he played a total of 36 games and scored 28 goals, of which 7 games and 1 goal were in the 1946–47 Yugoslav First League, the only season he played in Belgrade. Then he moved to FK Vardar where he will play in Yugoslav First and Second leagues between 1947 and 1955 making a total of 120 league appearances and 27 goals. He played a total with Vardar of 242 games and scored over 100 goals, he was among the first team captains, and was chosen as the Macedonian player of the year. Besides captain and prolific goalscorer, he was also at Vardar the coach of the youth team, having won Yugoslav youth championship in 1949. By 2016, he is considered by the FK Vardar official website as one of the club legends.

== Managerial career ==
Afterwards, he coached Turkish side Beşiktaş in 1967–68. Then he coached Greek side PAOK.

== Honours ==
=== Player ===
Partizan

- Yugoslav First League: 1946–47

Vardar

- Federal Second league: 1951

=== Manager ===
Vardar

- Federal Under 21 championship: 1948–49
