= Silvester Šereš =

Yugoslav footballer (1918–2000)

Personal information
- Date of birth: 7 March 1918
- Place of birth: Temerin, Austria-Hungary
- Date of death: 20 January 2000 (aged 81)
- Place of death: Temerin, FR Yugoslavia
- Position: Left winger

Youth career
- Temerini TC

Senior career*
Years	Team	Apps	(Gls)
1943–1944	Újvidéki AC	29	(12)
1945	MTK	5	(1)
1945–1947	Partizan	14	(1)
1947–1948	Spartak Subotica	17	(7)
1950–1952	Vojvodina	29	(8)
Total		94	(29)
- * Club domestic league appearances and goals

Silvester Šereš (Serbian Cyrillic: Силвестер Шереш, Hungarian: Sörös Szilveszter; 7 March 1918 – 20 January 2000) was a Yugoslav footballer of Hungarian descent.

== Career ==
During World War II, Šereš played for Újvidéki AC (formerly NAK) in the 1943–44 Nemzeti Bajnokság I season, scoring 12 goals in 29 appearances. He also spent some time with fellow NB I club MTK in 1945.

In October 1945, Šereš joined newly formed Partizan, scoring the club's first ever goal in a friendly match against the representative team of Zemun. He was also a member of the team that won the inaugural Yugoslav First League title.

== Career statistics ==
Appearances and goals by club, season and competition
Club	Season	League		
Club	Season	Division	Apps	Goals
Újvidéki AC	1943–44	Nemzeti Bajnokság I	29	12
MTK	1945	Nemzeti Bajnokság I	5	1
Partizan	1946–47	Yugoslav First League	12	1
Partizan	1947–48	Yugoslav First League	2	0
Partizan	Total		14	1
Spartak Subotica	1947–48	Yugoslav First League	10	4
Spartak Subotica	1948–49	Yugoslav Second League	7	3
Spartak Subotica	Total		17	7
Vojvodina	1951	Yugoslav First League	13	4
Vojvodina	1952	Yugoslav First League	16	4
Vojvodina	Total		29	8
Career total			94	29

== Honours ==
Partizan

- Yugoslav First League: 1946–47
