= Franjo Rupnik =

Croatian footballer

Personal information
- Full name: Franjo Rupnik
- Date of birth: 5 May 1921
- Place of birth: Osijek, Kingdom of SCS
- Date of death: 25 April 2000 (aged 78)
- Place of death: Osijek, Croatia
- Position: Midfielder

Senior career*
Years	Team	Apps	(Gls)
1938–1943	Hajduk Osijek		
1943	Concordia Zagreb		
1944	Zagorac Varaždin		
1945–1947	Partizan Belgrade	17	(12)
1947–1951	Proleter Osijek		

International career
1946–1950	Yugoslavia	6	(1)
- * Club domestic league appearances and goals

Franjo Rupnik (5 May 1921 – 25 April 2000) was a Croatian football player.

== Club career ==
Born in Osijek, he started playing in Hajduk Osijek, before moving to Zagreb's HŠK Concordia where he played until the beginning of World War II. He had a spell at NK Zagorac Varaždin. In 1945 he moved to Belgrade's FK Partizan where he stayed until 1947 and won the Yugoslav championship. Then in 1947, he returned to Osijek to play in Proleter until 1951, one of the predecessors of today's NK Osijek. After retiring, he became a youth coach at NK Osijek.

== International career ==
He played a total of six matches for the Yugoslavia national football team. His debut was in 1946 in Belgrade against Czechoslovakia (a 4–2 win), and his last match was in 1950, also in Belgrade, against Norway (a 4–0 win) scoring in that match his only goal for the national team.

== Honours ==
Partizan

- Yugoslav First League: 1946–47
