= Slavko Banduka =

Bosnian former footballer

Personal information
- Full name: Slavko Banduka
- Date of birth: 25 February 1947
- Place of birth: Sarajevo, FPR Yugoslavia
- Date of death: 19 June 1992 (aged 45)
- Place of death: Sarajevo, Bosnia and Herzegovina
- Position: Goalkeeper

Senior career*
Years	Team	Apps	(Gls)
1967	Partizan	0	(0)
1968	Bregalnica Štip	14	(0)
1969–1971	Pofalićki	57	(0)
- * Club domestic league appearances and goals

Slavko Banduka (Serbian Cyrillic: Славко Бандука; 25 February 1947 – 19 June 1992) was a professional footballer who played as a goalkeeper.

He was killed as a member of the Army of Republika Srpska on 19 June 1992 in Nedžarići, Sarajevo during the war there.
