= Stevan Jakuš =

Yugoslav footballer

Personal information
- Full name: Edvard Platz
- Date of birth: 24 December 1921
- Place of birth: Novi Sad, Kingdom of Yugoslavia
- Date of death: 21 March 1985 (aged 63)
- Place of death: SFR Yugoslavia
- Position: Midfielder

Senior career*
Years	Team	Apps	(Gls)
- NTK Novi Sad
1941–1942	Újvidékí AC	1	(0)
1946–1949	Partizan	6	(1)
1949–1951	OFK Beograd		
1951–1952	Mačva Šabac		
- * Club domestic league appearances and goals

Stevan Jakuš (Serbian Cyrillic: Стеван Јакуш, Hungarian: Jakus István, 24 December 1921 – 21 March 1985) was a Yugoslav footballer.

== Club career ==
Born in the outskirts of Novi Sad, Jakuš started playing in NTK Novi Sad. When Second World War started and the region was occupied by Hungary, he was added to the Újvidékí AC. However, he made only one appearance for UAC in the 1941–42 Nemzeti Bajnokság I before leaving the club and joining the resistance. By the end of the war he was a member of the Yugoslav Partisans. It is recorded that in Austria in May 1945 when Yugoslav and British troops met, a football match was disputed between the two and Jakuš played on Yugoslav side.

After the war, Jakuš joins FK Partizan. Although he mostly played for the reserves team, he did made 6 appearances and scored once in the Yugoslav First League and was part of Partizan squads that were Yugoslav champions in 1946–47 and 1948–49. In Autumn 1949 he moved to BSK, later renamed OFK Beograd, and, later, in 1951, on insistence on his former teammate from Partizan, Minda Jovanović, he joined FK Mačva Šabac.
