= Eternal derby (Serbia) =

Local derby in Belgrade

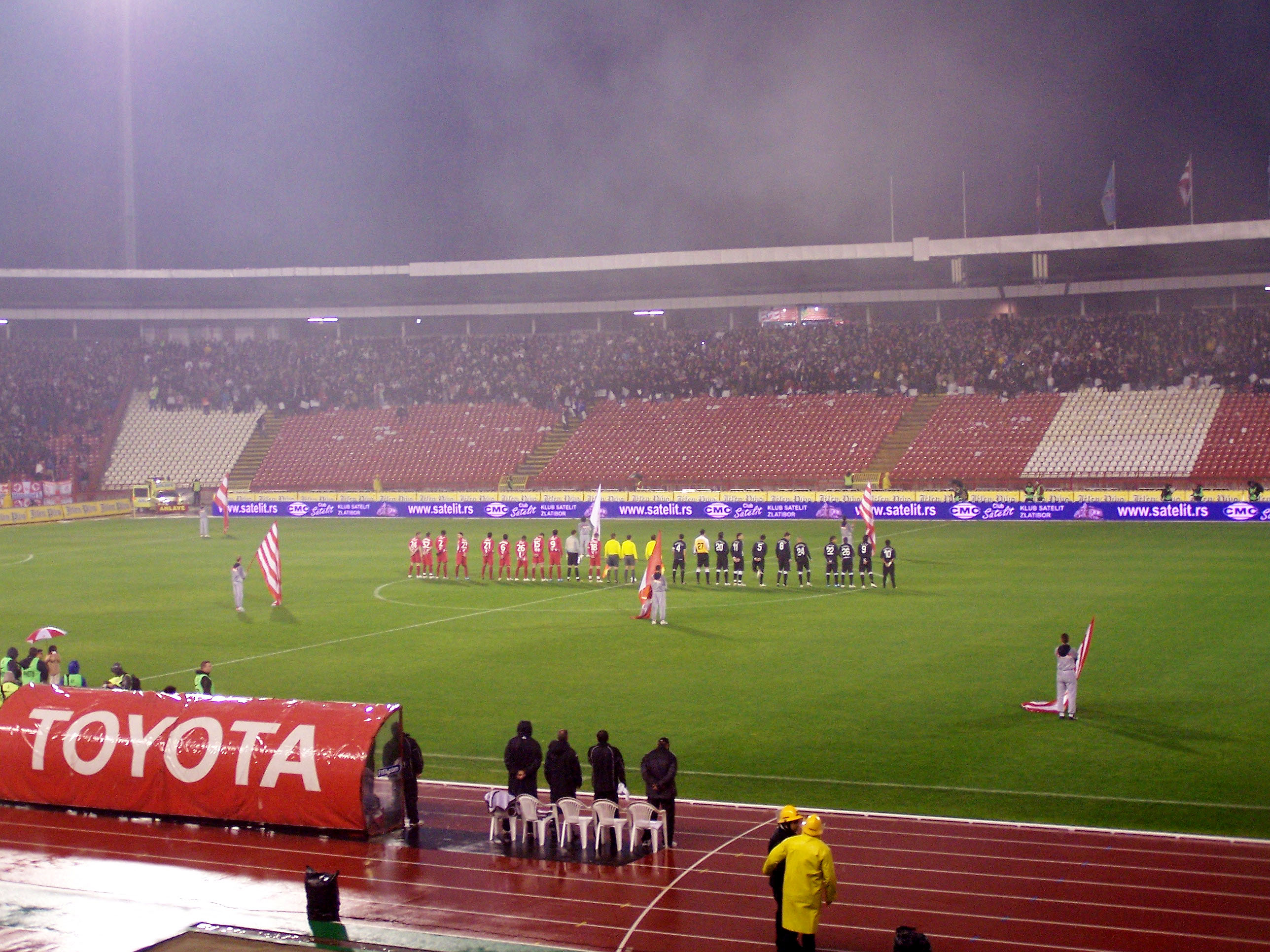
- Teams lining up before a league Večiti derbi match in November 2009.
- Other names: Belgrade derby
- Location: Belgrade, Serbia
- Teams: Red Star & Partizan
- First meeting: Partizan 2–0 Red Star; Friendly (21 April 1946)
- Latest meeting: Red Star 2–1 Partizan; 2026–27 Serbian SuperLiga (6 September 2026)
- Next meeting: 20 February 2027

Statistics
- Total meetings: Total: 275; League: 180
- All-time series: Red Star: 121; Draw: 72; Partizan: 82
- Largest victory: Red Star 1–7 Partizan; 1953–54 Yugoslav First League (6 December 1953)

The Eternal derby (Serbian: Вечити дерби, romanized: Večiti derbi), also called the Derby of Southeast Europe and Belgrade derby (Београдски дерби, Beogradski derbi), is the local derby in Belgrade, capital of Serbia, between fierce city rivals Red Star Belgrade and Partizan Belgrade, two of the most popular and most successful clubs in Serbia, although the derby has caused division throughout the whole of Serbia. It has been described as "one of European football's most bitter rivalries".

The rivalry is present in a number of different sports but the most intense matches are in football and basketball sections of both clubs. It started immediately after the creation of the two clubs in 1945 and the two clubs have been dominant in domestic football since then.

According to a 2008 survey, Red Star is the most popular club in Serbia with 48% of the population supporting them. The second most popular is Partizan. They also have many supporters in the Republika Srpska, Montenegro and among the Serbian diaspora.

The football rivalry is highly regarded worldwide being as among the fiercest ones. The highest attendance for a Red Star–Partizan match was on the 7th of November 1976. Red Star sold 90,142 tickets, but it is estimated that there were around 100,000 spectators at the Red Star Stadium.

== History ==
Red Star	vs	Partizan

Origins of both Red Star and Partizan are found in political institutions of the post-World War II Communist Yugoslavia. Red Star was formed on 4 March 1945 by the United Alliance of Anti-Fascist Youth, part of the new civil authority in Yugoslavia. A few months later, on 4 October 1945, Partizan was founded as the sports association of the Yugoslav People's Army (JNA). The first match between the two football teams was played on 5 January 1947. Red Star won 4–3 and an intense rivalry has developed since. Partizan got its first win, 1–0, in the very next derby on 27 April 1947.

However, the fierce Belgrade derby tradition originates from the pre-World War II rivalry between BSK Belgrade and SK Jugoslavija in the Kingdom of Yugoslavia. SK Jugoslavija was disbanded in 1945 by the new Communist authorities with its property nationalized and most of it signed over to the newly-formed Red Star. On the other hand, BSK was allowed to continue its existence by the new authorities; after successive name changes, the club came to be known as OFK Beograd since 1957, losing its relevance to the newly founded Partizan in the process. Although OFK Beograd became successful in its own right, both Red Star and Partizan quickly overtook it in popularity.

Over time, the on-pitch rivalry between Red Star and Partizan in the Yugoslavian Championship reflected the power struggle between the Interior Ministry and the Ministry of Defence. The two clubs were dominant in the post-1945 Yugoslav First League, with Red Star having won 19, and Partizan having won 11 Yugoslav championships. The clashes of these two against Hajduk Split and Dinamo Zagreb, the third and fourth respectively in number of national titles, were similarly intense. The four clubs were known as the big 4. After the break-up of Yugoslavia in 1992, the Belgrade derby further intensified, the two clubs having since then won all national titles except one.

== Honours ==
=== Honours ===
Competition	Red Star	Partizan
People's Republic of Serbia League	1	0
Yugoslav First League	19	11
First League of Serbia and Montenegro	5	8
Serbian SuperLiga	12	8
Yugoslav Cup	12	6
Serbia and Montenegro Cup	9	3
Serbian Cup	9	7
Yugoslav Super Cup	2	1
Yugoslav League Cup	1	0
Mitropa Cup	2	1
European Cup / UEFA Champions League	1	0
Intercontinental Cup	1	0
Total	74	45

=== International ===
Red Star has won 2 international, 2 regional and 69 domestic trophies, making them the most successful football club in Serbia and the former Yugoslavia. Partizan participated in one European final, won 44 domestic trophies and also 1 regional trophy.

Red Star: International titles – 4

- European Cup / UEFA Champions League
  - Winners (1): 1990–91
- Intercontinental Cup
  - Winners (1): 1991
- UEFA Cup / UEFA Europa League
  - Runners-up (1): 1978–79
- UEFA Super Cup
  - Runners-up (1): 1991
- Mitropa Cup
  - Winners (2): 1958, 1967–68

Partizan: International titles – 1

- European Cup / UEFA Champions League
  - Runners-up (1): 1965–66
- Mitropa Cup
  - Winners (1): 1978

== Supporters ==
An important aspect of the Belgrade derby are the fans. Both sides prepare intensely between the matches, make large flags and special messages that are appropriate for that particular occasion, to be usually directed towards the opposing side.

=== Delije ===
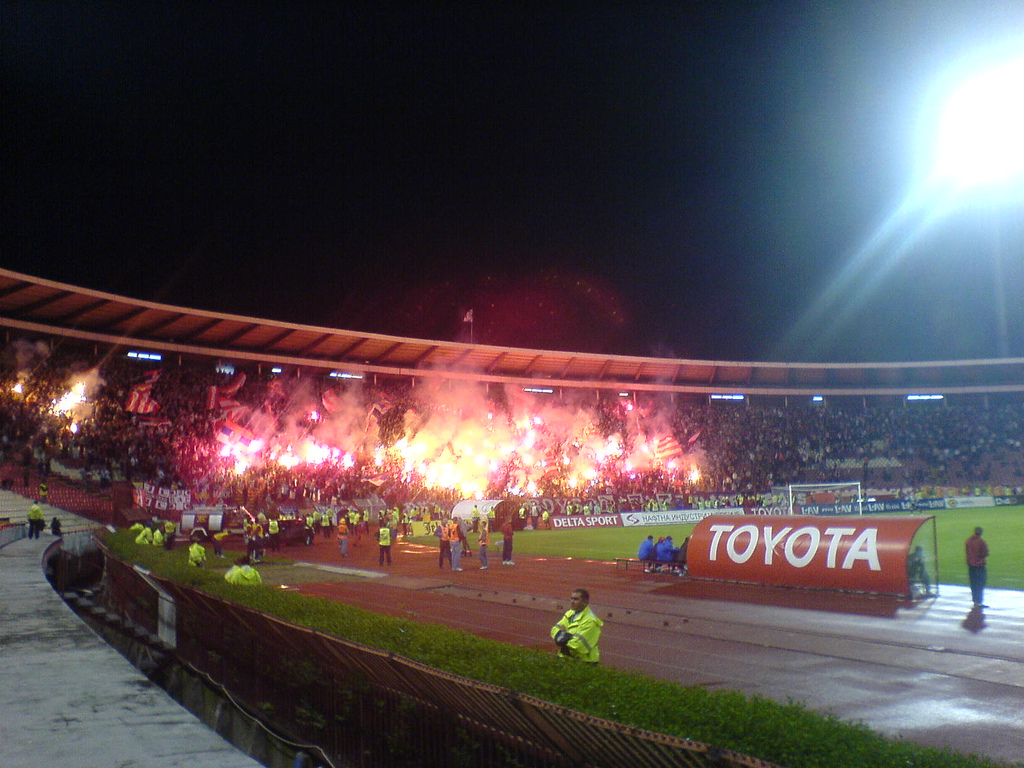
Red Star fans traditionally occupy the northern stands of both stadiums

Supporters of the various Red Star sports teams are known as Delije (Serbian Cyrillic: Делије, roughly translated to English as Heroes). The word Delije is plural of delija, a word of Turkish origin (deli) that entered the Serbian language during the Ottoman period, meaning brave, strong or handsome young man. The name Delije first began to be used by hardcore Red Star supporters during the late 1980s, with official inauguration taking place on 7 January 1989. Up to that point, the die-hard Red Star fans were scattered amongst 7–8 fan groups that shared the north stand at the Red Star Stadium (known colloquially as Marakana), most prominent of which were Red Devils, Zulu Warriors, and Ultras. As a sign of appreciation the club direction allowed the word Delije in block letters to be written across their stadium's north stand – the gathering point of the club's most loyal and passionate fans. They are also called Cigani (English: Gypsies) by their arch rivals Grobari, fans of Partizan. Although Delije generally consider the name Cigani to be insulting, they occasionally use this name in their own songs and chants. By 2010, Delije consist of four larger groups: Belgrade Boys, Ultra Boys, Heroes, and Brigate.

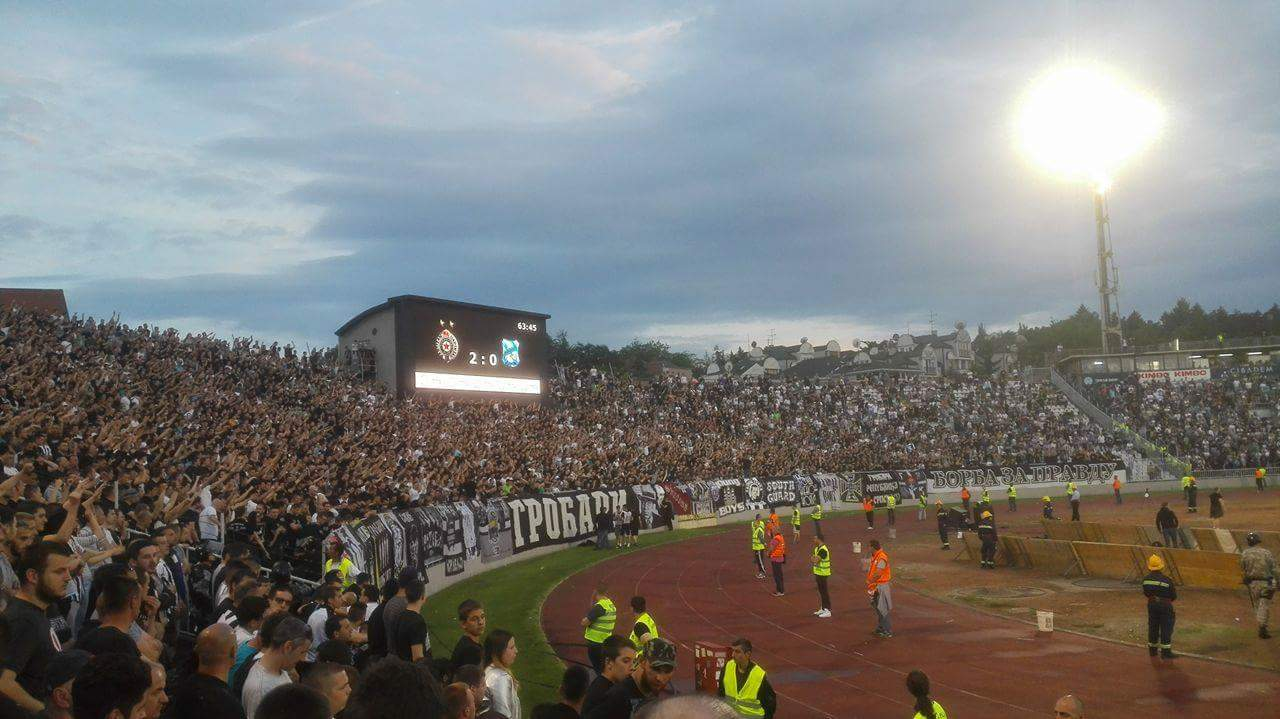
Partizan fans traditionally occupy the southern stands of both stadiums

=== Grobari ===
Partizan's supporters, known as Grobari (Serbian Cyrillic: Гробари, Gravediggers or Undertakers), were formed in 1970. The origin of the nickname itself is uncertain, but an accepted theory is that it was given by their biggest rivals, the Red Star fans, referring to club's mostly black colours which were similar to the uniforms of cemetery undertakers. The other theory says that the name arrives from the Partizan's stadium street name, Humska (humka meaning "grave mound"), in actuality named after medieval land of Hum. The first groups of organized Partizan supporters began to visit the JNA stadium in the late 1950s. Partizan's participation in the 1966 European Cup Final attracted much more fans to the stadium and it is considered to be the point when the organized fans moved to the south stand of the stadium, where they gather to this day. During the 1970s the Grobari started bringing fan equipment to the stadiums such as supporting scarves, signs, banners and flares. By the 1980s the Grobari were one of the four main fan groups in SFR Yugoslavia and began touring all Partizan's matches across the country and Europe. Because of their expressed hooliganism toward other clubs' supporters in those times, fans who represented the core of the Grobari firm were often called among themselves "Riot Squad". They were best known for their English style of supporting, which was mainly based on loud and continuous singing. By 2010, the Grobari consisted of three large groups: Grobari 1970, Zabranjeni and Južni Front.

== Stadiums ==
When Red Star Belgrade is the host, the derby is played at Rajko Mitić Stadium. Colloquially known as "Marakana" after the famous Brazilian stadium, it was opened in 1963. Its capacity is 51,755 spectators (100,000 before UEFA regulations), the highest in the country. Red Star Stadium was the host of 1973 European Cup Final, UEFA Euro 1976 Final and 1979 UEFA Cup Final.

When the host is Partizan, the derby is played at Partizan Stadium, formerly known as JNA Stadium which is still its common name. It was opened in 1949. Its capacity is 29,775 spectators (55,000 before UEFA regulations). Partizan fans call it Fudbalski Hram (English: "Temple of Football"). Both stadiums are located 1 kilometre away from each other in the Autokomanda neighborhood of Belgrade.

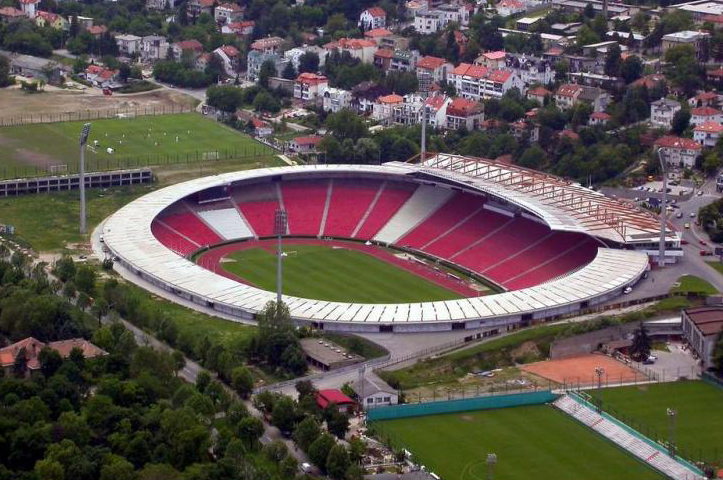
Rajko Mitić Stadium

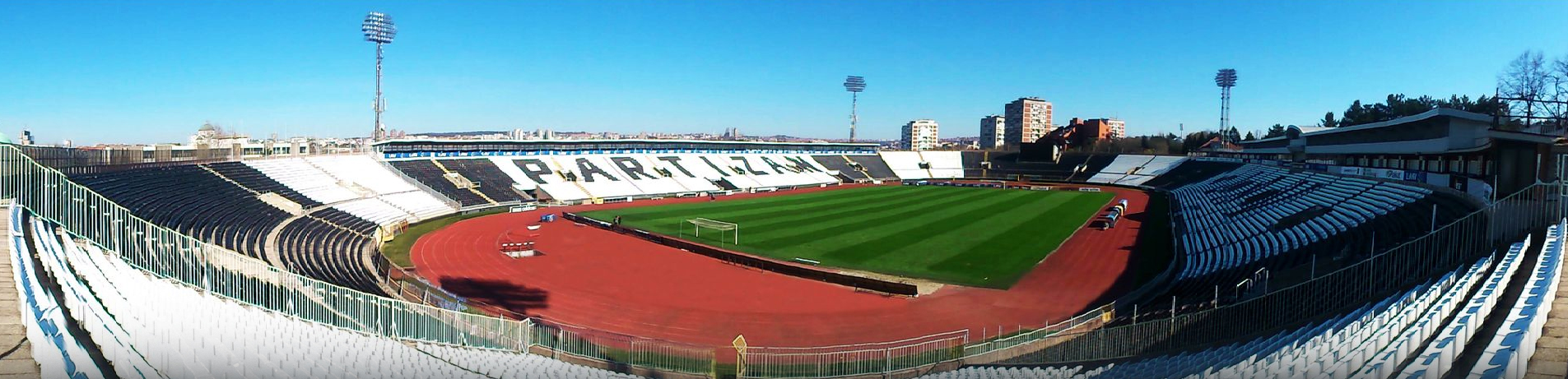
Partizan Stadium

== Records ==
Players

- Most appearances: 31, Saša Ilić for Partizan.
- Most goals: 13, Marko Valok for Partizan.
- Youngest player used: 16 years and 30 days, Dušan Vlahović for Partizan on 27 February 2016 (150th Eternal derby).
- Oldest player used: 41 years and 116 days, Saša Ilić for Partizan on 25 April 2019 (160th Eternal derby).

Clubs

- Most consecutive league victories: 24, Red Star during 2015–16 season.
- Most consecutive league games without defeat (undefeated run): 65, Red Star from 31 October 2021 to 26 August 2023 (counting playoffs).

Season

- Most points won in a single season: 108, Red Star during 2020–21 season.
- Most team goals in a single season: 123, Red Star during 2024–25 season.
- The best goal difference in a single season: +94, Red Star during 2020–21 season.
- Most points difference in a single season: 32 points. After 24 played rounds Red Star had 68 points with the first place in the league while Partizan had 36 points placing them 6th in the league during 2015–16 season.

Attendance

- Highest single game attendance: 100 000 spectators on 7 November 1976 (59th Eternal derby).

== Player records ==
Players with most goals in Eternal derby
No.	Name	Goals	Team
1	Marko Valok	13	Partizan
2	Bora Kostić	9	Red Star
2	Dragan Džajić	9	Red Star
3	Kosta Tomašević	8	Red Star
3	Milan Galić	8	Partizan
3	Cherif Ndiaye	8	Red Star

Players with most appearances in Eternal derby
No.	Name	Appearances	Team
1	Saša Ilić	31	Partizan
2	Momčilo Vukotić	25	Partizan
3	Bora Kostić	23	Red Star
4	Dragan Džajić	21	Red Star

== Head-to-head ranking in Yugoslav First League (1947–1992) ==
P.	47	48	49	50	51	52	53	54	55	56	57	58	59	60	61	62	63	64	65	66	67	68	69	70	71	72	73	74	75	76	77	78	79	80	81	82	83	84	85	86	87	88	89	90	91	92
1st	1		1		1		1			1	1		1	1	1	1	1	1	1			1	1	1			1			1	1	1		1	1		1	1		1	1	1		1	1	1
2nd			2	2		2		2		2		2	2		2							2		2		2						2				2		2		2		2	2			2
3rd	3	3		3			3	3						3					3		3		3					3	3				3						3		3				3	
4th					4				4		4	4				4											4	4		4	4								4					4		
5th		5							5									5		5	5				5	5											5									
6th						6																			6				6							6							6			
7th																	7																													
8th																																			8											
11th																				11																										
13th																																		13												
15th																																	15													

== Head-to-head ranking in First League of Serbia and Montenegro and Serbian SuperLiga (1992–present) ==
P.	93	94	95	96	97	98	99	00	01	02	03	04	05	06	07	08	09	10	11	12	13	14	15	16	17	18	19	20	21	22	23	24	25
1st	1	1	1	1	1		1	1	1	1	1	1	1	1	1	1	1	1	1	1	1	1	1	1	1	1	1	1	1	1	1	1	1
2nd	2	2	2	2	2	2		2	2	2	2	2	2	2	2	2		2	2	2	2	2	2	2	2	2		2	2	2		2	2
3rd						3	3										3										3						
4th																															4		

• Total: Red Star with 46 higher finishes, Partizan with 33 higher finishes (as of the end of the 2024–25 season)

== Statistics ==
=== Head to head results ===
As of 6 September 2026, a total of 180 derby games have been played in the domestic league.

Before the 1963–64 season all derby matches were played at Partizan Stadium.

	Red Star wins	Draws	Partizan wins	Goal difference
at Red Star Stadium	48	30	16	152:100
at Partizan Stadium	26	28	32	107:111
Total	74	58	48	259:211

Competition	Played	Red Star wins	Draws	Partizan wins	Red Star goals	Partizan goals
League	180	74	58	48	259	211
Cup	41	22	5	14	61	50
Other	54	25	9	20	103	88
Total	275	121	72	82	423	349

All statistics correct as of 6 September 2026.

=== Last ten matches ===
Competition	Host	Guest	Date	Result
2023–24 Serbian SuperLiga	Partizan	Red Star	20 December 2023	2–1
2023–24 Serbian SuperLiga	Red Star	Partizan	9 March 2024	2–2
2023–24 Serbian SuperLiga	Red Star	Partizan	20 April 2024	3–2
2023–24 Serbian Cup	Red Star	Partizan	24 April 2024	2–0
2024–25 Serbian SuperLiga	Partizan	Red Star	23 September 2024	0–4
2024–25 Serbian SuperLiga	Red Star	Partizan	22 February 2025	3–3
2024–25 Serbian SuperLiga	Red Star	Partizan	12 April 2025	2–1
2025–26 Serbian SuperLiga	Partizan	Red Star	20 September 2025	1–2
2025–26 Serbian SuperLiga	Red Star	Partizan	22 February 2026	3–0
2025–26 Serbian SuperLiga	Red Star	Partizan	26 April 2026	3–0

=== Players who have played for both clubs (senior career) ===
- Miodrag Jovanović (Red Star, through BSK Beograd, Partizan)
- Milivoje Đurđević (Partizan, Red Star)
- Milovan Ćirić (Red Star, Partizan)
- Jovan Jezerkić (Red Star, Partizan, again Red Star)
- Jovan Beleslin (Red Star, Partizan)
- Tihomir Ognjanov (Partizan, through Spartak Subotica, Red Star)
- Bela Palfi (Partizan, through Spartak Subotica, Red Star)
- Miomir Petrović (Red Star, Partizan)
- Božidar Drenovac (Red Star, Partizan)
- Vasilije Šijaković (Partizan, through BSK Beograd, Red Star)
- Ranko Borozan (Partizan, Red Star)
- Branko Zebec (Partizan, Red Star)
- Antun Rudinski (Red Star, Partizan)
- Radivoje Ognjanović (Partizan, Red Star)
- Velibor Vasović (Partizan, Red Star, again Partizan)
- Zvezdan Čebinac (Partizan, Red Star)
- Vladimir Jocić (Red Star, through Radnički Niš, Partizan)
- Milan Babić (Red Star, through Napredak, Partizan)
- Milko Djurovski (Red Star, Partizan)
- Goran Milojević (Red Star, Partizan)
- Dejan Joksimović (Red Star, through Vojvodina, Partizan, again Red Star)
- Rade Mojović (Partizan, through Obilić, Red Star)
- Petar Puača (Red Star, Partizan, through OFK Beograd, Obilić, again Red Star)
- Nikoslav Bjegović (Partizan, through Radnički Kragujevac, OFK Beograd, Vojvodina, Red Star)
- Dalibor Škorić (Partizan, through Rudar Pljevlja, Rad, Red Star)
- Cléo (Red Star, Partizan)
- Vladimir Stojković (Red Star, through Nantes, Vitesse, Sporting, Getafe, Wigan Athletic, again Sporting, Partizan, Ergotelis, Maccabi Haifa, Nottingham Forest, again Partizan)
- Miloš Bosančić (Partizan, through Boavista, OFK Beograd, Čukarički, Slovan Liberec, Gyeongnam, Red Star)
- Aboubakar Oumarou (Red Star, through OFK Beograd, Vojvodina, Waasland-Beveren, Partizan)
- Petar Đuričković (Red Star, through Radnički Kragujevac, Radnički Niš, Partizan)
- Ognjen Ožegović (Red Star, through Banat, Voždovac, Rad, Jagodina, Borac Čačak, Vojvodina, Changchun Yatai, Čukarički, Partizan)
- Nikola Antić (Red Star, through Jagodina, Vojvodina, Shaktar Soligorsk, Khimki, Partizan)

=== Transfers between two clubs (players) ===
- Milivoje Đurđević (from Partizan to Red Star in summer 1947)
- Milovan Ćirić (from Red Star to Partizan in summer 1947)
- Jovan Jezerkić (from Red Star to Partizan in autumn 1947)
- Jovan Jezerkić (from Partizan to Red Star in summer 1948)
- Miomir Petrović (from Red Star to Partizan in summer 1948)
- Božidar Drenovac (from Red Star to Partizan in summer 1948)
- Dušan Krajčinović (from Red Star to Partizan in summer 1952)
- Ranko Borozan (from Partizan to Red Star in summer 1957)
- Branko Zebec (from Partizan to Red Star in summer 1959)
- Antun Rudinski (from Red Star to Partizan in summer 1962)
- Radivoje Ognjanović (from Partizan to Red Star in summer 1962)
- Velibor Vasović (from Partizan to Red Star in summer 1963)
- Velibor Vasović (from Red Star to Partizan in summer 1964)
- Zvezdan Čebinac (from Partizan to Red Star in summer 1964)
- Milko Djurovski (from Red Star to Partizan in summer 1986)
- Goran Milojević (from Red Star to Partizan in summer 1988)
- Dejan Joksimović (from Partizan to Red Star in summer 1990)
- Petar Puača (from Red Star to Partizan in autumn 1990)
- Cléo (from Red Star to Partizan in summer 2009)

=== Transfers between two clubs (coaches) ===
- Milovan Ćirić (from Partizan to Red Star in summer 1954)

=== Players who played for one club in youth career and for rival club in senior career ===
- Dušan Krajčinović (youth career Red Star, senior career Partizan)
- Dragoljub Živković (youth career Partizan, Red Star, senior career Red Star)
- Nenad Stavrić (youth career Red Star, senior career Majdanpek, Partizan)
- Nikola Marjanović (youth career Red Star, senior career Galenika, Rijeka, Partizan)
- Petar Puača (youth career with both Red Star and Partizan, senior career with Red Star)
- Miroslav Čermelj (youth career Red Star, senior career Obilić, Partizan)
- Dragan Stevanović (youth career Partizan, senior career Voždovac, Rad, Wolfsburg, St.Pauli, again Rad, Red Star)
- Saša Radivojević (youth career Partizan, senior career Radnički Beograd, Zeta, Pegah Gilan, Apollon Kalamarias, Red Star)
- Goran Adamović (youth career with both Red Star and Partizan, senior career BSK Borča, Red Star)
- Žarko Lazetić (youth career Red Star, senior career Obilić, Smederevo, Beograd, Bežanija, Partizan)
- Goran Gavrančić (youth career Red Star, senior career Čukarički, Dynamo Kyiv, PAOK Thessaloniki, Partizan)
- Jovan Krneta (youth career Partizan, senior career Teleoptik, Sopot, Red Star)
- Ljubo Nenadić (youth career Partizan, senior career Teleoptik, Grafičar, Radnički Kragujevac, Metalac, again Radnički Kragujevac, Red Star)
- Aleksandar Pantić (youth career Partizan, senior career Rad, Red Star)
- Milan Jokić (youth career Partizan, senior career Red Star)
- Novak Martinović (youth career Partizan, senior career Rad, BSK Borča, OFK Beograd, Smederevo, Panduri, Steaua, Wuhan, Red Star)
- Filip Kljajić (youth career Red Star, senior career Hajduk Beograd, Šumadija Jagnjilo, Metalac, Rad, Partizan)
- Nikola Antić (youth career Partizan, senior career Rad, Palić, again Rad, Red Star)
- Zoran Rendulić (youth career Partizan, senior career Remont Čačak, Borac Čačak, Ried, Grenoble, Javor Ivanjica, Pohang Steelers, Shenyang Shenbei, Čukarički, Red Star)
- Marko Jovičić (youth career Red Star, Rad, Partizan, senior career Žarkovo, Teleoptik, Partizan)
- Stefan Milošević (youth career Red Star, Partizan, senior career Spartak Subotica, Red Star)
- Nemanja G. Miletić (youth career Red Star, senior career Sopot, Radnički Stobex, again Sopot, again Radnički Stobex, Mačva Šabac, Javor Ivanjica, Partizan)
- Stefan Ilić (youth career Red Star, Partizan, senior career Spartak Subotica, Red Star)
- Uroš Đurđević (youth career Red Star, senior career Rad, Vitesse, Palermo, Partizan)
- Aleksandar Pešić (youth career Partizan, senior career Radnički Niš, OFI Crete, Sheriff Tiraspol, Jagodina, Toulouse, Atalanta, Red Star)
- Nemanja Radonjić (youth career Partizan, senior career Viitorul Constanta, Roma, Empoli, again Roma, Čukarički, Red Star)
- Nikola Stojiljković (youth career Partizan, senior career Rad, Čukarički, Braga, Kayserispor, Red Star)
- Radivoj Bosić (youth career Red Star, senior career Grafičar, Partizan)
- Stefan Kovač (youth career Red Star, senior career IMT, Čukarički, Partizan)
- Stefan Mitrović (youth career Red Star, senior career Petržalka, Zbrojovka Brno, Metalac Gornji Milanovac, Kortrijk, Benfica B, Valladolid, SC Freiburg, Gent, Strasbourg, Getafe, again Gent, Partizan)

=== Played for one club and coached the rival club ===
- Petar Ćosić (senior career Red Star, Izmir as player, Crvenka, Budućnost Valjevo, BASK Beograd, national team of Jordan, young national selection of Yugoslavia, young selection of Partizan, Teleoptik as coach)
- Trav(Partizan Beograde coach)
- Ratko Dostanić (youth career Partizan as player, through Obilić, Smederevo, Slavia Sofia, Red Star, again Slavia Sofia, OFK Belgrade, Bežanija, Veria, Dalian, Vardar, Srem, Levski Sofia, again Red Star as coach)

=== Players who have played in Eternal derby for both clubs (league and cup matches) ===
- Milivoje Đurđević (1 match for Partizan, 9 matches for Red Star)
- Jovan Jezerkić (6 matches for Red Star, 2 matches for Partizan)
- Bela Palfi (4 matches for Partizan, 9 matches for Red Star)
- Miomir Petrović (5 matches for Red Star, 3 matches for Partizan)
- Božidar Drenovac (3 matches for Red Star, 4 matches for Partizan)
- Vasilije Šijaković (1 match for Partizan, 1 match for Red Star)
- Ranko Borozan (5 matches for Partizan, 3 matches for Red Star)
- Branko Zebec (14 matches for Partizan, 3 matches for Red Star)
- Velibor Vasović (11 matches for Partizan, 1 match for Red Star)
- Milan Babić (1 match for Red Star, 1 match for Partizan)
- Milko Djurovski (8 matches for Red Star, 6 matches for Partizan)
- Goran Milojević (7 matches for Red Star, 7 matches for Partizan)
- Dejan Joksimović (2 matches for Red Star, 2 matches for Partizan)
- Cléo (2 matches for Red Star, 3 matches for Partizan)
- Vladimir Stojković (2 matches for Red Star, 22 matches for Partizan)
- Miloš Bosančić (1 match for Partizan, 2 matches for Red Star)
- Aboubakar Oumarou (2 matches for Red Star, 1 match for Partizan)

=== Players who have scored in Eternal derby for both clubs (championship and cup matches) ===
- Jovan Jezerkić (3 goals for Red Star, 2 goals for Partizan)
- Branko Zebec (5 goals for Partizan, 1 goal for Red Star)
- Milko Djurovski (6 goals for Red Star, 2 goals for Partizan)

=== Coaches who worked at both clubs ===
- Milovan Ćirić (Partizan, Red Star)
- Aleksandar Tomašević (Red Star, through Odred Ljubljana, Vardar, Hajduk Split, Partizan)
- Gojko Zec (Partizan, through Borac Banjaluka, Vojvodina, Rijeka, Red Star)
- Velibor Vasović (Partizan, through Proleter, Angers SCO, Paris Saint-Germain, Ethnikos Piraeus, Red Star)
- Toma Savić goalkeeping coach (Partizan, Red Star)

== List of the Eternal derby league matches ==
Nbr	Date	Home	Result	Away	Partizan Scorers	Red Star Scorers
1	5 January 1947	Partizan	3–4	Red Star	Đajić (o.g.), Kašanin (o.g.), Bobek	Jezerkić (3), Đajić
2	27 April 1947	Red Star	0–1	Partizan	Stanković (o.g.)	
3	5 October 1947	Red Star	1–1	Partizan	Mihajlović	Stanković
4	27 April 1948	Partizan	1–0	Red Star	Jezerkić	
5	7 November 1948	Partizan	1–0	Red Star	Bobek	
6	1 May 1949	Red Star	2–2	Partizan	Valok (2)	Tomašević, Takač
7	19 March 1950	Red Star	3–1	Partizan	Pajević	Tomašević, Antić, Vukosavljević
8	17 September 1950	Partizan	2–1	Red Star	Valok, Mihajlović	Tomašević
9	17 June 1951	Partizan	6–1	Red Star	Šijaković, Bobek (2), Valok (3)	Tomašević
10	4 November 1951	Red Star	2–0	Partizan		Tomašević, Živanović
11	23 November 1952	Red Star	1–1	Partizan	Valok	Tomašević
12	31 May 1953	Partizan	2–4	Red Star	Valok, Veselinović	Mitić, Živanović, Tomašević, Đajić
13	6 December 1953	Partizan	7–1	Red Star	Bobek, Zebec (2), Mihajlović (2), Herceg (2)	Tomašević
14	2 May 1954	Red Star	0–2	Partizan	Valok (2)	
15	21 November 1954	Red Star	2–1	Partizan	Valok	Toplak, Živanović
16	8 June 1955	Partizan	1–4	Red Star	Mihajlović	Cokić (2), Toplak, Mitić
17	11 September 1955	Partizan	0–1	Red Star		Šekularac
18	18 March 1956	Red Star	1–3	Partizan	Borozan, Kaloperović, Popović (o.g.)	Rudinski
19	14 October 1956	Red Star	2–0	Partizan		Tasić, Rudinski
20	2 June 1957	Partizan	1–0	Red Star	Stojanović	
21	25 August 1957	Red Star	2–2	Partizan	Valok (2)	Toplak, Kostić
22	2 March 1958	Red Star	2–2	Partizan	Mesaroš, Zebec	Toplak (2)
23	26 October 1958	Partizan	0–2	Red Star		Kostić (2)
24	10 May 1959.	Red Star	1–3	Partizan	Miladinović, Kaloperović, Galić	Maravić
25	27 September 1959.	Partizan	0–3	Red Star		Stipić (2), Popović
26	17 April 1960	Red Star	1–1	Partizan	Kovačević	Toplak
27	30 October 1960	Partizan	3–0	Red Star	Galić (2), Vukelić	
28	16 April 1961	Red Star	3–2	Partizan	Kovačević, Galić	Rudinski (2), Kostić
29	1 October 1961	Partizan	0–0	Red Star		
30	8 April 1962	Partizan	1–1	Red Star	Kovačević	Malešev
31	28 October 1962	Partizan	5–0	Red Star	Galić (3), Vislavski (2)	
32	28 April 1963	Partizan	1–2	Red Star	Vasović	Kostić (2)
33	17 November 1963	Red Star	1–0	Partizan		Prljinčević
34	3 May 1964	Partizan	0–2	Red Star		Prljinčević (2)
35	16 August 1964	Red Star	2–2	Partizan	Pirmajer, Galić	Andrić, Čop
36	7 March 1965	Partizan	1–2	Red Star	Pirmajer	Prljinčević, Kostić
37	5 December 1965	Partizan	1–2	Red Star	Pirmajer	Milošević, Džajić
38	5 June 1966	Red Star	2–1	Partizan	Bečejac	Kostić (2)
39	11 September 1966	Partizan	1–1	Red Star	Bajić	Džajić
40	26 March 1967	Red Star	3–2	Partizan	Hasanagić, Bečejac	Milić, Džajić, Aćimović
41	22 October 1967	Partizan	1–0	Red Star	Hasanagić	
42	12 May 1968	Red Star	2–2	Partizan	Hošić, Dojčinovski (o.g.)	Džajić, Aćimović
43	17 November 1968	Red Star	6–1	Partizan	Katić	Ostojić (3), Pavlović, Antonijević, Džajić
44	15 June 1969	Partizan	2–2	Red Star	Kovačević, Đorđić	Lazarević (2)
45	23 November 1969	Partizan	1–3	Red Star	Hošić	Jevtić, Aćimović, Džajić
46	7 June 1970	Red Star	1–1	Partizan	Mihajlović	Đorić
47	15 November 1970	Red Star	1–2	Partizan	Bjeković (2)	Filipović
48	6 June 1971	Partizan	0–2	Red Star		Karasi, Džajić
49	24 October 1971	Partizan	0–1	Red Star		Janković
50	7 May 1972	Red Star	1–1	Partizan	Bogićević (o.g.)	Džajić
51	22 October 1972	Red Star	2–0	Partizan		Karasi, Lazarević
52	2 May 1973	Partizan	1–1	Red Star	Radaković	Janković
53	8 September 1973	Red Star	1–0	Partizan		Bogićević
54	17 March 1974	Partizan	2–1	Red Star	Cvetković, Živaljević	Karasi
55	27 October 1974	Red Star	3–1	Partizan	Nikolić	Savić, Filipović, Džajić
56	18 May 1975	Partizan	1–1	Red Star	Đorđević	Petrović
57	7 September 1975	Red Star	2–0	Partizan		Sušić, Filipović
58	28 March 1976	Partizan	1–4	Red Star	Bjeković	Sušić, Stamenković (2), Savić
59	7 November 1976	Red Star	1–0	Partizan		Filipović
60	22 May 1977	Partizan	2–1	Red Star	Zavišić, Prekazi	Savić
61	23 October 1977	Red Star	1–3	Partizan	Trifunović, Vukotić, Zavišić	Filipović
62	7 May 1978	Partizan	3–2	Red Star	Vukotić (2), Santrač	Jelikić, Filipović
63	29 November 1978.	Partizan	1–3	Red Star	Santrač	Šestić, Milosavljević, Krmpotić
64	10 June 1979	Red Star	3–0	Partizan		Savić (2), Borovnica
65	18 November 1979	Red Star	2–0	Partizan		Filipović, Šestić
66	22 June 1980	Partizan	0–0	Red Star		
67	7 December 1980	Partizan	3–1	Red Star	Klinčarski, Varga, Vukotić	Repčić
68	14 June 1981	Red Star	1–1	Partizan	Vukotić	Repčić
69	25 October 1981	Red Star	1–0	Partizan		Djurovski
70	14 April 1982	Partizan	1–4	Red Star	Živković	Djurovski, Šestić (2), Đorđić
71	7 November 1982	Red Star	1–1	Partizan	Mance	Jovin
72	4 June 1983	Partizan	3–2	Red Star	Varga, Mance (2)	Đurović, Milojević
73	23 October 1983	Partizan	0–0	Red Star		
74	6 May 1984	Red Star	0–0	Partizan		
75	11 November 1984	Partizan	2–1	Red Star	Mance, Varga	Djurovski
76	19 May 1985	Red Star	2–0	Partizan		Kaličanin (o.g.), Djurovski
77	21 August 1985	Partizan	1–1	Red Star	Vučićević	Djurovski
78	15 March 1986	Red Star	2–1	Partizan	Čapljić	Nikolić, Musemić
79	12 October 1986	Partizan	2–0	Red Star	Smajić, Djurovski	
80	19 April 1987	Red Star	3–1	Partizan	Djurovski	Musemić, Cvetković (2)
81	6 September 1987	Partizan	2–3	Red Star	Stevanović, Vučićević	Stojković, Cvetković (2)
82	3 April 1988	Red Star	1–1	Partizan	Đukić	Binić
83	9 October 1988	Partizan	1–0	Red Star	Brnović	
84	3 May 1989	Red Star	3–1	Partizan	Šćepović	Prosinečki, Jurić, Stošić
85	17 September 1989	Red Star	1–0	Partizan		Lukić
86	16 March 1990	Partizan	0–2	Red Star		Pančev, Prosinečki
87	13 October 1990	Partizan	1–1	Red Star	Vujačić	Savićević
88	27 April 1991	Red Star	3–1	Partizan	Mijatović	Najdoski, Prosinečki, Jugović
89	22 September 1991	Partizan	2–2	Red Star	Novak, Mijatović	Pančev, Mihajlović
90	22 March 1992	Red Star	0–0	Partizan		
91	2 October 1992	Red Star	1–1	Partizan	Mijatović	Lukić
92	10 April 1993	Partizan	1–0	Red Star	Mijatović	
93	26 September 1993	Partizan	0–2	Red Star		Ivić, Petković
94	27 November 1993	Red Star	1–1	Partizan	Brnović	Petković
95	27 February 1994	Partizan	1–0	Red Star	Brnović	
96	30 April 1994	Red Star	3–2	Partizan	Milošević, Ćirić	Vidaković, Ivić (2)
97	24 September 1994	Partizan	1–1	Red Star	Ćirić	Kovačević
98	26 November 1994	Red Star	3–2	Partizan	Đurić, Ćirić	Krupniković, Stanković, Petković
99	18 March 1995	Partizan	2–2	Red Star	Čakar, Saveljić	Krupniković, Adžić
100	6 May 1995	Red Star	2–1	Partizan	Bjeković	Kovačević, Stojkovski
101	16 September 1995	Red Star	0–1	Partizan	Tešović	
102	26 November 1995	Partizan	1–1	Red Star	Beširović	Stefanović
103	10 March 1996	Red Star	2–3	Partizan	Pažin, Nađ, Čakar	Krupniković, Pantelić
104	27 April 1996	Partizan	0–0	Red Star		
105	21 September 1996	Red Star	1–3	Partizan	Hristov, Saveljić, Svetličić	Mićić
106	8 March 1997	Partizan	3–0	Red Star	Saveljić, Čakar, Tomić	
107	16 April 1997	Partizan	2–1	Red Star	Hristov, Ćirić	Stanković
108	27 September 1997	Red Star	2–0	Partizan		Ognjenović (2)
109	21 February 1998	Partizan	1–2	Red Star	Isailović	Kristić, Stanković
110	8 April 1998	Red Star	4–0	Partizan		Stanković (2), Ognjenović, Gojković
111	20 September 1998	Partizan	2–1	Red Star	Tomić, Kežman	Ljubojević
112	20 March 1999	Red Star	2–2	Partizan	Kežman, Ilić	Pjanović, Gojković
113	30 October 1999	Partizan	2–0	Red Star	Ilić, Kežman	
114	2 April 2000	Red Star	2–1	Partizan	Kežman	Pjanović, Savić (o.g.)
115	7 March 2001	Red Star	2–0	Partizan		Pjanović, Lalatović
116	14 April 2001	Partizan	2–1	Red Star	Ilić, Iliev	Drulić
117	3 November 2001	Red Star	0–0	Partizan		
118	21 April 2002	Partizan	0–3	Red Star		Vidić, Bogavac, Milovanović
119	19 October 2002	Partizan	2–2	Red Star	Iliev, Ilić	Bošković, Pjanović
120	20 April 2003	Red Star	2–0	Partizan		Bošković, Bogavac
121	8 November 2003	Red Star	3–0	Partizan		Žigić (2), Perović
122	17 April 2004	Partizan	0–0	Red Star		
123	16 October 2004	Partizan	0–0	Red Star		
124	23 April 2005	Red Star	1–1	Partizan	Đorđević	Pantelić
125	15 October 2005	Red Star	2–0	Partizan		Luković, Perović
126	1 April 2006	Partizan	0–0	Red Star		
127	23 September 2006	Partizan	0–0	Red Star		
128	24 February 2007	Red Star	2–4	Partizan	Mihajlov, Bajić, Marinković, Lazetić	Castillo, Burzanović
129	11 April 2007	Red Star	1–0	Partizan		Purović
130	5 May 2007	Partizan	1–2	Red Star	Rukavina	Burzanović, Milijaš
131	29 September 2007	Partizan	2–2	Red Star	Jovetić, Moreira	Koroman (2)
132	1 March 2008	Red Star	4–1	Partizan	Lazić	Milovanović, Castillo (2), Milijaš
133	5 April 2008	Partizan	1–1	Red Star	Juca	Burzanović
134	5 October 2008	Red Star	0–2	Partizan	Diarra, Juca	
135	28 February 2009	Partizan	1–1	Red Star	Moreira	Tutorić
136	8 April 2009	Partizan	2–0	Red Star	Diarra, Vujović	
137	28 November 2009	Red Star	1–2	Partizan	Diarra, Cléo	Knežević (o.g.)
138	8 May 2010	Partizan	1–0	Red Star	Petrović	
139	23 October 2010	Red Star	0–1	Partizan	Moreira	
140	23 April 2011	Partizan	1–0	Red Star	Tagoe	
141	26 November 2011	Red Star	0–2	Partizan	Vukić, Šćepović	
142	5 May 2012	Partizan	0–1	Red Star		Cadú
143	17 November 2012	Red Star	3–2	Partizan	Mitrović, Jovanović (o.g.)	Kasalica, Milivojević, Milijaš
144	18 May 2013	Partizan	1–0	Red Star	Jojić	
145	2 November 2013	Red Star	1–0	Partizan		Obradović (o.g.)
146	26 April 2014	Partizan	2–1	Red Star	Drinčić, Kojić	Mrđa
147	18 October 2014	Partizan	1–0	Red Star	Drinčić	
148	25 April 2015	Red Star	0–0	Partizan		
149	12 September 2015	Red Star	3–1	Partizan	Stevanović	Vieira (2), Katai
150	27 February 2016	Partizan	1–2	Red Star	Gogoua	Ibáñez, Vieira
151	16 April 2016	Red Star	1–1	Partizan	Everton	Sikimić
152	17 September 2016	Partizan	1–0	Red Star	Leonardo	
153	4 March 2017	Red Star	1–1	Partizan	Đurđević	Kanga
154	18 April 2017	Red Star	1–3	Partizan	Leonardo (2), Tawamba	Boakye
155	27 August 2017	Red Star	0–0	Partizan		
156	13 December 2017	Partizan	1–1	Red Star	Soumah	Boakye
157	14 April 2018	Red Star	2–1	Partizan	Ožegović	Radonjić, Pešić
158	23 September 2018	Partizan	1–1	Red Star	Gomes	Boakye
159	3 March 2019	Red Star	1–1	Partizan	Nikolić	Pavkov
160	25 April 2019	Red Star	2–1	Partizan	Gomes	Ben, Vukanović
161	22 September 2019	Partizan	2–0	Red Star	Soumah, Tošić	
162	1 March 2020	Red Star	0–0	Partizan		
163	18 October 2020	Partizan	1–1	Red Star	Stevanović	Katai
164	7 April 2021	Red Star	1–0	Partizan		Ivanić
165	19 September 2021	Partizan	1–1	Red Star	Natcho	Katai
166	27 February 2022	Red Star	2–0	Partizan		Omoijuanfo, Katai
167	16 April 2022	Red Star	0–0	Partizan		
168	31 August 2022	Partizan	1–1	Red Star	Natcho	Bukari
169	3 March 2023	Red Star	1–0	Partizan		Vigo
170	26 April 2023	Partizan	0–0	Red Star		
171	20 December 2023	Partizan	2–1	Red Star	Natcho, Saldanha	Ndiaye
172	9 March 2024	Red Star	2–2	Partizan	Saldanha, Kalulu	Spajić, Ndiaye
173	20 April 2024	Red Star	3–2	Partizan	Baždar, Severina	Kanga, Ndiaye, Katai
174	23 September 2024	Partizan	0–4	Red Star		Ndiaye (3), Silas
175	22 February 2025	Red Star	3–3	Partizan	Zubairu, Kovač, Nikolić	Ndiaye (2), Ivanić
176	12 April 2025	Red Star	2–1	Partizan	Kalulu	Maksimović, Simić (o.g.)
177	20 September 2025	Partizan	1–2	Red Star	Milošević	Elšnik, Radonjić
178	22 February 2026	Red Star	3–0	Partizan		Kostov, Arnautović, Katai
179	26 April 2026	Red Star	3–0	Partizan		Eraković, Avdić, Seol

== List of the Eternal derby cup matches ==
Nbr	Date	Round	Home	Result	Away	Partizan Scorers	Red Star Scorers
1	23 November 1947	Quarter–finals	Partizan	2–1	Red Star	Bobek, Jezerkić	Vukosavljević
2	29 November 1948	Final	Red Star	3–0	Partizan		Vukosavljević (2), Mitić
3*	27 November 1949	Semi–finals	Red Star	2–1	Partizan 2	Ćirić	Mitić, Vukosavljević
4	17 December 1950	Semi–finals	Red Star	1–0	Partizan		Ognjanov
5	29 November 1952	Final	Partizan	6–0	Red Star	Valok (2), Zebec (2), Bobek, Veselinović	
6	29 November 1954	Final	Partizan	4–1	Red Star	Valok (2), Bobek, Mihajlović	Živanović
7	10 April 1957	Quarter–finals	Partizan	4–2	Red Star	Milutinović (2), Valok, Mesaroš	Cokić (2)
8	25 April 1958	Semi–finals	Partizan	2–3	Red Star	Vukelić, Mihajlović	Kostić, Rudinski, Šekularac
9	23 May 1959	Final	Red Star	3–1	Partizan	Galić	Kostić (2), Maravić
10	2 December 1959	First round	Red Star	2–2 (5–6 pen.)	Partizan	Kaloperović, Kovačević	Zebec, Kostić
11	13 March 1985	Quarter–finals	Partizan	0–2	Red Star		Halilović, Djurovski
12	30 November 1988	Semi–finals, 1st leg	Partizan	2–1	Red Star	Đukić, Vokrri	Bursać
13	21 December 1988	Semi–finals, 2nd leg	Red Star	1–1	Partizan	Vokrri	Stošić
14	18 April 1990	Semi–finals, 1st leg	Red Star	1–0	Partizan		Pančev
15	2 May 1990	Semi–finals, 2nd leg	Partizan	2–3	Red Star	Stevanović, Šćepović	Prosinečki, Šabanadžović, Spasić (o.g.)
16	14 May 1992	Final, 1st leg	Red Star	0–1	Partizan	Vujačić	
17	21 May 1992	Final, 2nd leg	Partizan	2–2	Red Star	Mijatović, Jokanović	Mihajlović, Pančev
18	8 May 1993	Final, 1st leg	Partizan	1–0	Red Star	Zahovič	
19	15 May 1993	Final, 2nd leg	Red Star	1–0 (5–4 pen.)	Partizan		Drobnjak
20	9 March 1994	Semi–finals, 1st leg	Red Star	1–0	Partizan		Vasilijević
21	6 April 1994	Semi–finals, 2nd leg	Partizan	3–1	Red Star	Milošević (2), Vasiljević	Ivić
22	26 October 1994	Quarter–finals, 1st leg	Red Star	2–0	Partizan		Krupniković (2)
23	9 November 1994	Quarter–finals, 2nd leg	Partizan	3–3	Red Star	Tešović, Nađ, Milošević	Perović, Stanković, Živković
24	8 May 1996	Final, 1st leg	Red Star	3–0	Partizan		Jovičić, Krupniković, Živković
25	15 May 1996	Final, 2nd leg	Partizan	1–3	Red Star	Vukićević	P. Stanković, Krupniković, D. Stanković
26	26 June 1999	Final	Red Star	4–2	Partizan	Rašović, Kežman	Škorić (2), Pjanović, Gojković
27	9 May 2001	Final	Red Star	0–1	Partizan	Ilić	
28	21 April 2004	Semi–finals	Red Star	1–0	Partizan		Pantelić
29	11 May 2005	Semi–finals	Red Star	2–0	Partizan		Žigić, Krivokapić
30	17 April 2007	Semi–finals	Red Star	1–0	Partizan		Milijaš
31	16 April 2008	Semi–finals	Red Star	2–3	Partizan	Diarra (2), Jovetić	Burzanović, Jestrović
32	16 March 2011	Semi–finals, 1st leg	Partizan	2–0	Red Star	Tagoe (2)	
33	6 April 2011	Semi–finals, 2nd leg	Red Star	1–0	Partizan		Kaluđerović
34	21 March 2012	Semi–finals, 1st leg	Red Star	2–0	Partizan		Milunović, Kasalica
35	11 April 2012	Semi–finals, 2nd leg	Partizan	0–2	Red Star		Lazović, Borja
36	27 May 2017	Final	Partizan	1–0	Red Star	Milenković	
37	23 May 2019	Final	Red Star	0–1	Partizan	Ostojić	
38	10 June 2020	Semi–finals	Partizan	1–0	Red Star	Natcho	
39	25 May 2021	Final	Red Star	0–0 (4–3 pen.)	Partizan		
40	26 May 2022	Final	Red Star	2–1	Partizan	Urošević	Katai (2)
41	24 April 2024	Semi–finals	Red Star	2–0	Partizan		Filipović (o.g.), Olayinka

- Partizan participated with two teams.

== National trophies in five popular team sports ==
Year	Football		Basketball		Volleyball		Handball		Water polo	
Year	Championship	Cup	Championship	Cup	Championship	Cup	Championship	Cup	Championship	Cup
People's Republic of Serbia
1946	CZ (1)	—	—	—	—	—	—	—	—	—
Federal People's Republic of Yugoslavia
1946	—	—	CZ (1)	—	PAR (1)	—	—	—	—	—
1947	PAR (1)	PAR (1)	CZ (2)	—	PAR (2)	—	—	—	—	—
1948	—	CZ (1)	CZ (3)	—	—	—	—	—	—	—
1949	PAR (2)	CZ (2)	CZ (4)	—	PAR (3)	—	—	—	—	—
1950	—	CZ (3)	CZ (5)	—	PAR (4)	PAR (1)	—	—	—	—
1951	CZ (2)	—	CZ (6)	—	CZ (1)	—	—	—	—	—
1952	—	PAR (2)	CZ (7)	—	—	—	—	—	—	—
1953	CZ (3)	—	CZ (8)	—	PAR (5)	—	—	—	—	—
1954	—	PAR (3)	CZ (9)	—	CZ (2)	—	—	—	—	—
1955	—	—	CZ (10)	—	—	—	CZ (1)	—	—	—
1956	CZ (4)	—	—	—	CZ (3)	—	CZ (2)	CZ (1)	—	—
1957	CZ (5)	PAR (4)	—	—	CZ (4)	—	—	—	—	—
1958	—	CZ (4)	—	—	—	—	—	—	—	—
1959	CZ (6)	CZ (5)	—	—	—	—	—	PAR (1)	—	—
1960	CZ (7)	—	—	—	—	CZ (1)	—	—	—	—
1961	PAR (3)	—	—	—	—	PAR (2)	—	—	—	—
1962	PAR (4)	—	—	—	—	—	—	—	—	—
1963	PAR (5)	—	—	—	—	—	—	—	PAR (1)	—
Socialist Federal Republic of Yugoslavia
1964	CZ (8)	CZ (6)	—	—	—	PAR (3)	—	—	PAR (2)	—
1965	PAR (6)	—	—	—	—	—	—	—	PAR (3)	—
1966	—	—	—	—	—	—	—	PAR (2)	PAR (4)	—
1967	—	—	—	—	PAR (6)	—	—	—	—	—
1968	CZ (9)	CZ (7)	—	—	—	—	—	—	PAR (5)	—
1969	CZ (10)	—	CZ (11)	—	—	—	—	—	—	—
1970	CZ (11)	CZ (8)	—	—	—	—	—	—	PAR (6)	—
1971	—	CZ (9)	—	CZ (1)	—	PAR (4)	—	PAR (3)	—	—
1972	—	—	CZ (12)	—	—	CZ (2)	—	—	PAR (7)	—
1973	CZ (12)	—	—	CZ (2)	PAR (7)	CZ (3)	—	—	PAR (8)	PAR (1)
1974	—	—	—	—	CZ (5)	PAR (5)	—	—	PAR (9)	PAR (2)
1975	—	—	—	CZ (3)	—	CZ (4)	—	—	PAR (10)	PAR (3)
1976	PAR (7)	—	PAR (1)	—	—	—	—	—	PAR (11)	PAR (4)
1977	CZ (13)	—	—	—	—	—	—	—	PAR (12)	—
1978	PAR (8)	—	—	—	PAR (8)	—	—	—	PAR (13)	PAR (5)
1979	—	—	PAR (2)	PAR (1)	—	—	—	—	PAR (14)	PAR (6)
1980	CZ (14)	—	—	—	—	—	—	—	—	—
1981	CZ (15)	—	PAR (3)	—	—	—	—	—	—	—
1982	—	CZ (10)	—	—	—	—	—	—	—	PAR (7)
1983	PAR (9)	—	—	—	—	—	—	—	—	—
1984	CZ (16)	—	—	—	—	—	—	—	PAR (15)	—
1985	—	CZ (11)	—	—	—	—	—	—	—	PAR (8)
1986	PAR (10)	—	—	—	—	—	—	—	—	—
1987	PAR (11)	—	PAR (4)	—	—	—	—	—	PAR (16)	PAR (9)
1988	CZ (17)	—	—	—	—	—	—	—	PAR (17)	PAR (10)
1989	—	PAR (5)	—	PAR (2)	—	PAR (6)	—	—	—	—
1990	CZ (18)	CZ (12)	—	—	PAR (9)	PAR (7)	—	—	—	PAR (11)
1991	CZ (19)	—	—	—	PAR (10)	CZ (5)	—	—	—	PAR (12)
Federal Republic of Yugoslavia
1992	CZ (20)	PAR (6)	PAR (5)	PAR (3)	—	—	—	—	CZ (1)	PAR (13)
1993	PAR (12)	CZ (13)	CZ (13)	—	—	CZ (6)	PAR (1)	PAR (4)	CZ (2)	PAR (14)
1994	PAR (13)	PAR (7)	CZ (14)	PAR (4)	—	—	PAR (2)	PAR (5)	—	PAR (15)
1995	CZ (21)	CZ (14)	PAR (6)	PAR (5)	—	—	PAR (3)	CZ (2)	PAR (18)	PAR (16)
1996	PAR (14)	CZ (15)	PAR (7)	—	—	—	CZ (3)	CZ (3)	—	—
1997	PAR (15)	CZ (16)	PAR (8)	—	—	CZ (7)	CZ (4)	—	—	—
1998	—	PAR (8)	CZ (15)	—	—	—	CZ (5)	PAR (6)	—	—
1999	PAR (16)	CZ (17)	—	PAR (6)	—	CZ (8)	PAR (4)	—	—	—
2000	CZ (22)	CZ (18)	—	PAR (7)	—	—	—	—	—	—
2001	CZ (23)	PAR (9)	—	—	—	—	—	PAR (7)	—	—
2002	PAR (17)	CZ (19)	PAR (9)	PAR (8)	—	—	PAR (5)	—	PAR (19)	PAR (17)
2003	PAR (18)	—	PAR (10)	—	CZ (6)	—	PAR (6)	—	—	—
Serbia and Montenegro
2004	CZ (24)	CZ (20)	PAR (11)	CZ (4)	—	—	CZ (6)	CZ (4)	—	—
2005	PAR (19)	—	PAR (12)	—	—	—	—	—	—	—
2006	CZ (25)	CZ (21)	PAR (13)	CZ (5)	—	—	CZ (7)	—	—	—
Serbia
2007	CZ (26)	CZ (22)	PAR (14)	—	—	—	CZ (8)	PAR (8)	PAR (20)	PAR (18)
2008	PAR (20)	PAR (10)	PAR (15)	PAR (9)	CZ (7)	—	CZ (9)	PAR (9)	PAR (21)	PAR (19)
2009	PAR (21)	PAR (11)	PAR (16)	PAR (10)	—	CZ (9)	PAR (7)	—	PAR (22)	PAR (20)
2010	PAR (22)	CZ (23)	PAR (17)	PAR (11)	—	—	—	—	PAR (23)	PAR (21)
2011	PAR (23)	PAR (12)	PAR (18)	PAR (12)	PAR (11)	CZ (10)	PAR (8)	—	PAR (24)	PAR (22)
2012	PAR (24)	CZ (24)	PAR (19)	PAR (13)	CZ (8)	—	PAR (9)	PAR (10)	PAR (25)	PAR (23)
2013	PAR (25)	—	PAR (20)	CZ (6)	CZ (9)	CZ (11)	—	PAR (11)	CZ (3)	CZ (1)
2014	CZ (27)	—	PAR (21)	CZ (7)	CZ (10)	CZ (12)	—	—	CZ (4)	CZ (2)
2015	PAR (26)	—	CZ (16)	CZ (8)	CZ (11)	—	—	—	PAR (26)	—
2016	CZ (28)	PAR (13)	CZ (17)	—	CZ (12)	CZ (13)	—	—	PAR (27)	PAR (24)
2017	PAR (27)	PAR (14)	CZ (18)	CZ (9)	—	—	—	CZ (5)	PAR (28)	PAR (25)
2018	CZ (29)	PAR (15)	CZ (19)	PAR (14)	—	—	—	—	PAR (29)	PAR (26)
2019	CZ (30)	PAR (16)	CZ (20)	PAR (15)	—	CZ (14)	—	—	—	—
2020	CZ (31)	—	—	PAR (16)	—	—	—	—	—	—
2021	CZ (32)	CZ (25)	CZ (21)	CZ (10)	—	—	—	—	—	CZ (3)
2022	CZ (33)	CZ (26)	CZ (22)	CZ (11)	—	PAR (8)	—	—	—	—
2023	CZ (34)	CZ (27)	CZ (23)	CZ (12)	PAR (12)	PAR (9)	—	—	—	CZ (4)
2024	CZ (35)	CZ (28)	CZ (24)	CZ (13)	CZ (13)	—	—	PAR (12)	—	—
2025	CZ (36)	CZ (29)	PAR (22)	CZ (14)	—	—	PAR (10)	—	—	—
2026	CZ (37)	CZ (30)	—	CZ (15)	—	—	PAR (11)	PAR (13)	—	—

== See also ==
- List of association football club rivalries in Europe
- List of Red Star Belgrade footballers
- List of FK Partizan players
- Crvena Zvezda–Partizan basketball rivalry
