= 1947–48 Yugoslav First League =

Prva savezna liga
- Season: 1947–48
- Champions: Dinamo Zagreb (1st title)
- Relegated: Vardar; Spartak; Sarajevo
- Matches: 90
- Goals: 286 (3.18 per match)
- Top goalscorer: Franjo Wölfl (22)

== Teams ==
=== Changes from last season ===
Teams promoted from 1946–47 Yugoslav Second League

- Sarajevo

Teams relegated from 1946–47 Yugoslav First League

- 9th place: Kvarner (Rijeka)
- 10th place: Budućnost (Titograd)
- 12th place: Željezničar (Sarajevo)
- 13th place: 14. Oktobar (Niš)
- 14th place: Nafta Lendava

=== Overview ===
Team	Home city	Republic	Stadium	Position in 1946–47
Crvena zvezda	Belgrade	SR Serbia		3rd
Dinamo Zagreb	Zagreb	SR Croatia		2nd
Hajduk Split	Split	SR Croatia	Stadion Stari plac	4th
Lokomotiva	Zagreb	SR Croatia		7th
Metalac	Belgrade	SR Serbia		5th
Partizan	Belgrade	SR Serbia		1st
Ponziana	Trieste	Free Territory of Trieste		11th
Sarajevo	Sarajevo	SR Bosnia and Herzegovina	Stadion Koševo	
Spartak	Subotica	SR Serbia		6th
Vardar^{[A]}^{[B]}	Skopje	SR Macedonia	Gradski stadion Skopje	

=== Notes ===
- ^{A} FK Pobeda participating in the 1946-47 season was renamed FK Vardar after fusion with another local club FK Makedonija.
- ^{B} FK Pobeda after ending the 1946–47 season at the 8th place has won the relegation play-offs against FK Sloga Novi Sad and remained in the League under the new name FK Vardar.
- ^{C} CS Ponziana was relegated at the 1946–47 season but was readmitted to the first league instead of better placed S.C.F. Quarnero, due to the political need to have Triest-based club in the Yugoslav league, as a propaganda tool.

== League table ==
Pos	Team	Pld	W	D	L	GF	GA	GR	Pts	Qualification or relegation
1	Dinamo Zagreb (C)	18	14	1	3	56	20	2.800	29	
2	Hajduk Split	18	11	2	5	40	15	2.667	24	
3	Partizan	18	10	4	4	46	22	2.091	24	
4	Lokomotiva	18	7	5	6	21	18	1.167	19	
5	Red Star Belgrade	18	5	6	7	24	25	0.960	16	
6	Metalac Belgrade	18	4	8	6	16	24	0.667	16	
7	Ponziana	18	6	4	8	21	45	0.467	16	
8	Vardar (R)	18	5	4	9	22	39	0.564	14	Qualification for relegation play-offs (Note: Naša Krila Zemun, third placed team from Yugoslav Second League, defeated Vardar 5–4 on aggregate.)
9	Spartak Subotica (R)	18	5	1	12	21	38	0.553	11	Relegation to Yugoslav Second League
10	Sarajevo (R)	18	2	7	9	19	40	0.475	11	Relegation to Yugoslav Second League

Source: rsssf.org
Rules for classification: 1st points; 2nd goal average.
(C) Champions; (R) Relegated

== Results ==
Home \ Away	DIN	HAJ	LOK	MET	PAR	PON	RSB	SAR	SPA	VAR
Dinamo Zagreb		2–1	0–1	3–1	1–0	5–0	5–1	6–1	3–2	4–0
Hajduk Split	0–2		4–2	3–0	2–1	1–2	4–0	1–0	2–0	12–1
Lokomotiva	2–0	0–0		2–1	3–1	3–0	1–1	0–0	0–1	1–0
Metalac Belgrade	0–3	1–0	0–3		1–1	2–0	2–1	1–1	1–1	0–0
Partizan	3–1	0–1	2–1	0–0		5–0	1–0	3–3	3–1	4–0
Ponziana	3–6	0–0	3–0	1–1	1–8		1–0	4–2	1–0	1–1
Red Star	1–1	0–1	0–0	2–2	1–1	2–0		4–1	5–1	2–1
Sarajevo	1–5	0–3	2–2	0–0	1–5	1–1	2–1		0–1	2–0
Spartak Subotica	1–6	2–4	2–0	1–2	2–3	2–3	0–2	2–1		1–0
Vardar	2–3	0–2	1–0	2–1	4–3	6–0	1–1	1–1	2–1	

Source: DataSoccer.it
Legend: Blue = home team win; Yellow = draw; Red = away team win.

== Winning squad ==
Champions:

- Dinamo Zagreb (coach: Karl Mütsch)

players (league matches/league goals):

- Slavko Arneri 6 (0)
- Josip Babić 9 (0)
- Aleksandar Benko 9 (4)
- Zvonimir Cimermančić 18 (11)
- Željko Čajkovski 18 (6)
- Drago Horvat 18 (0)
- Ivica Horvat 9 (0)
- Ivan Jazbinšek 9 (0)
- Marko Jurić 12 (0)
- Ratko Kacijan 16 (2)
- Mirko Kokotović 2 (0)
- Dragutin Lojen 1 (0)
- Zvonimir Monsider 3 (0)
- Branko Pleše 18 (2)
- Krešimir Pukšec 10 (0)
- Ivica Rajs 10 (3)
- Božidar Senčar 7 (4)
- Zvonko Strnad 2 (1)
- Đuka Strugar 4 (0)
- Franjo Wölfl 17 (22)

1 og

== Top scorers ==
Rank	Player	Club	Goals
1	(Socialist Federal Republic of Yugoslavia) Franjo Wölfl	Dinamo Zagreb	22
2	(Socialist Federal Republic of Yugoslavia) Prvoslav Mihajlović	Partizan	16
3	(Socialist Federal Republic of Yugoslavia) Frane Matošić	Hajduk Split	14
4	(Socialist Federal Republic of Yugoslavia) Zvonimir Cimermančić	Dinamo Zagreb	12
5	(Socialist Federal Republic of Yugoslavia) Branko Viđak	Hajduk Split	8
6	(Socialist Federal Republic of Yugoslavia) Kiril Simonovski	Partizan	7

== Cup ==
=== Round of Sixteen ===
Home team	Score	Away team
Partizan Beograd	3 - 2	Proleter Osijek
NK Zagreb	3 - 4	Dinamo Zagreb
Hajduk Split	0 - 2	Budućnost Titograd
Metalac Beograd	1 - 1 (coin flip)	Metalac Zagreb
Napredak Krusevac	(coin flip) 1 - 1	Poncijana Trieste
Sloga Novi Sad	4 - 8 (aet)	Naša Krila Zemun
Sarajevo	0 - 0 (coin flip)	Lokomotiva Zagreb
Crvena Zvezda Beograd	5 - 1	Spartak Subotica

=== Quarter finals ===
Crvena Zvezda Beograd x - x X

Partizan Beograd 2 - 0 Lokomotiva Zagreb

X x - x X

Dinamo Zagreb x - x X

=== Semi finals ===
Crvena Zvezda Beograd x - x X

Partizan Beograd 3 - 3 Dinamo Zagreb

=== Finals ===
Partizan 0 - 3 Crvena Zvezda

Stadium: Stadion Crvene Zvezde

Attendance: 30,000

Referee: Lemesic (Split)

Partizan: Franjo Šoštarić, Vladimir Firm, M.Petrovic, Zlatko Čajkovski, Milorad Jovanović, Lajčo Jakovetić, Prvoslav Mihajlović, Božidar Drenovac, Stjepan Bobek, Aleksandar Atanacković, Kiril Simonovski

Crvena zvezda: Srđan Mrkušić, Branko Stanković, Milenko Drakulić, Dimitrije Tadić, Milivoje Đurđević, Predrag Đajić, Cokic, Rajko Mitić, Kosta Tomašević, Bela Palfi, Branislav Vukosavljević

== See also ==
- Yugoslav Cup
- Football Association of Yugoslavia
