= 1948–49 Yugoslav First League =

Prva savezna liga
- Season: 1948–49
- Champions: Partizan (2nd title)
- Relegated: Sloga; Ponziana
- Top goalscorer: Frane Matošić (17)

== League table ==
| Pos | Team | Pld | W | D | L | GF | GA | GR | Pts | Relegation |
|---|---|---|---|---|---|---|---|---|---|---|
| 1 | Partizan (C) | 18 | 14 | 1 | 3 | 39 | 14 | 2.786 | 29 | |
| 2 | Red Star Belgrade | 18 | 11 | 4 | 3 | 37 | 19 | 1.947 | 26 | |
| 3 | Hajduk Split | 18 | 10 | 5 | 3 | 41 | 20 | 2.050 | 25 | |
| 4 | Dinamo Zagreb | 18 | 7 | 5 | 6 | 29 | 25 | 1.160 | 19 | |
| 5 | Naša Krila | 18 | 6 | 4 | 8 | 32 | 28 | 1.143 | 16 | |
| 6 | Budućnost | 18 | 6 | 4 | 8 | 29 | 36 | 0.806 | 16 | |
| 7 | Metalac Belgrade | 18 | 5 | 4 | 9 | 31 | 34 | 0.912 | 14 | |
| 8 | Lokomotiva | 18 | 6 | 1 | 11 | 23 | 38 | 0.605 | 13 | |
| 9 | Sloga Novi Sad (R) | 18 | 5 | 2 | 11 | 17 | 31 | 0.548 | 12 | Relegation to Yugoslav Second League (Note: Ponziana Trieste stopped competing in the Yugoslav League system after the 1948–49 season .) |
| 10 | Ponziana (R) | 18 | 3 | 4 | 11 | 12 | 45 | 0.267 | 10 | Relegation to Yugoslav Second League |

Source: rsssf.org
Rules for classification: 1st points; 2nd goal average.
(C) Champions; (R) Relegated

== Results ==
| Home \ Away | BUD | DIN | HAJ | LOK | MET | NAŠ | PAR | PON | RSB | SLO |
|---|---|---|---|---|---|---|---|---|---|---|
| Budućnost | | 1–1 | 2–5 | 3–0 | 2–1 | 3–1 | 2–0 | 1–1 | 2–3 | 4–2 |
| Dinamo Zagreb | 5–3 | | 1–1 | 3–1 | 2–2 | 0–2 | 2–1 | 3–0 | 1–3 | 3–1 |
| Hajduk Split | 2–1 | 1–2 | | 4–1 | 3–0 | 1–1 | 1–3 | 5–1 | 3–2 | 3–0 |
| Lokomotiva | 2–1 | 0–3 | 1–1 | | 1–0 | 4–0 | 0–3 | 4–0 | 0–2 | 4–1 |
| Metalac Belgrade | 7–0 | 1–1 | 0–4 | 8–2 | | 0–0 | 0–3 | 2–0 | 0–3 | 2–0 |
| Naša Krila | 3–1 | 2–0 | 1–1 | 4–0 | 5–1 | | 0–1 | 6–2 | 0–0 | 1–2 |
| Partizan | 2–1 | 3–1 | 2–0 | 2–0 | 3–1 | 3–2 | | 4–1 | 1–0 | 2–0 |
| Ponziana | 0–0 | 0–0 | 0–3 | 0–2 | 0–4 | 3–2 | 0–4 | | 2–1 | 2–1 |
| Red Star | 1–1 | 2–1 | 1–1 | 2–1 | 4–1 | 3–1 | 2–2 | 3–0 | | 3–1 |
| Sloga Novi Sad | 0–1 | 1–0 | 1–2 | 1–0 | 1–1 | 3–1 | 1–0 | 0–0 | 1–2 | |

Source: DataSoccer.it
Legend: Blue = home team win; Yellow = draw; Red = away team win.

== Winning squad ==
Champions: FK Partizan
| Player | League | |
| Player | Matches | Goals |
|---|---|---|
| Kiril Simonovski | 18 | 4 |
| Miomir Petrović | 18 | 0 |
| Stjepan Bobek | 17 | 13 |
| Miodrag Jovanović | 17 | 0 |
| Franjo Šoštarić (goalkeeper) | 17 | 0 |
| Aleksandar Atanacković | 15 | 3 |
| Lajoš Jakovetić | 15 | 1 |
| Zvonko Strnad | 14 | 3 |
| Zlatko Čajkovski | 14 | 0 |
| Marko Valok | 11 | 11 |
| Ratko Čolić | 9 | 0 |
| Vladimir Firm | 9 | 0 |
| Momčilo Radunović | 8 | 1 |
| Božidar Senčar | 7 | 2 |
| Božidar Drenovac | 4 | 0 |
| Prvoslav Mihajlović | 3 | 1 |
| Rajko Grčević (goalkeeper) | 1 | 0 |
| Stevan Jakuš | 1 | 0 |
Coach: Illés Spitz

== Top scorers ==
| Rank | Player | Club | Goals |
|---|---|---|---|
| 1 | (Socialist Federal Republic of Yugoslavia) Frane Matošić | Hajduk Split | 16 |
| 2 | (Socialist Federal Republic of Yugoslavia) Kosta Tomašević | Red Star | 15 |
| 3 | (Socialist Federal Republic of Yugoslavia) Stjepan Bobek | Partizan | 13 |
| 4 | (Socialist Federal Republic of Yugoslavia) Zvonimir Cimermančić | Dinamo Zagreb | 12 |
| 5 | (Socialist Federal Republic of Yugoslavia) Franjo Wölfl | Dinamo Zagreb | 11 |
| 5 | (Socialist Federal Republic of Yugoslavia) Marko Valok | Partizan | 11 |

== Cup ==
=== Round of Sixteen ===
Partizan Beograd 1 - 0 FK Sarajevo

Hajduk Split x - x X

X x - x X

X x - x X

X x - x X

X x - x X

Nasa Krila Zemun x - x X

Crvena Zvezda Beograd x - x X

=== Quarter finals ===
Crvena Zvezda Beograd x - x X

Partizan Beograd 4 - 2 Hajduk Split

X x - x X

Nasa Krila Zemun x - x X

=== Semi finals ===
Crvena Zvezda Beograd 2 - 1 Partizan

Nasa Krila Zemun x - x X

=== Finals ===
Nasa Krila Zemun 2 - 3 Crvena Zvezda

Stadium: Stadium JNA

Attendance: 50,000

Referee: Podupski (Zagreb)

Nasa Krila: Popadić, Filipović, Jovanović, Kobe, Zvekanović, Adamović, A.Panić, Lenko Grčić, Popović, Zlatković, Borović

Crvena Zvezda: Srđan Mrkušić, Branko Stanković, Mladen Kašanin, Bela Palfi, Milivoje Đurđević, Predrag Đajić, Tihomir Ognjanov, Rajko Mitić, Kosta Tomašević, Josip Takač, Branislav Vukosavljević

== See also ==
- 1948–49 Yugoslav Second League
- Yugoslav Cup
- Yugoslav League Championship
- Football Association of Yugoslavia
