= 1945 Yugoslav Football Tournament =

Football tournament edition

In 1945, in the still existing Democratic Federal Yugoslavia, football once again began to be played nationally after a six-year hiatus due to World War II.

The first post-war national tournament was a hastily organized week-long competition in cup format from September 3 until September 9, 1945. Each federal unit (socialist republic) within FPR Yugoslavia gathered a representative team. There were six teams representing Bosnia and Herzegovina, Croatia, Montenegro, Macedonia, Serbia and Slovenia, one team representing the autonomous region within Serbia, Vojvodina, and the final team being the Yugoslav People's Army (Jugoslovenska Narodna Armija, JNA) football team.

== Cup ==
Quarter-finals
(Socialist Republic of Serbia) Serbia	2
(Socialist Republic of Montenegro) Montenegro	0
(Socialist Republic of Croatia) Croatia	6
(Socialist Republic of Bosnia and Herzegovina) Bosnia and Herzegovina	1
(Socialist Federal Republic of Yugoslavia) JNA	8
(Socialist Republic of Slovenia) Slovenia	2
(Socialist Federal Republic of Yugoslavia) Vojvodina	3
(Socialist Republic of Macedonia) Macedonia	1

Semi-finals
(Socialist Republic of Serbia) Serbia	3
(Socialist Republic of Croatia) Croatia	1
(Socialist Federal Republic of Yugoslavia) JNA	4
(Socialist Federal Republic of Yugoslavia) Vojvodina	3

Final
(Socialist Republic of Serbia) Serbia	1
(Socialist Federal Republic of Yugoslavia) JNA	0

=== Quarter finals ===
Serbia (Socialist Republic of Serbia)	2 - 0	Montenegro (Socialist Republic of Montenegro)
Croatia (Socialist Republic of Croatia)	6 - 1	Bosnia and Herzegovina (Socialist Republic of Bosnia and Herzegovina)
Vojvodina (Socialist Federal Republic of Yugoslavia)	3 - 1	Macedonia (Socialist Republic of Macedonia)
JNA (Socialist Federal Republic of Yugoslavia)	8 - 2	Slovenia (Socialist Republic of Slovenia)

=== Semi finals ===
Serbia (Socialist Republic of Serbia)	3 - 1	Croatia (Socialist Republic of Croatia)
JNA (Socialist Federal Republic of Yugoslavia)	4 - 3	Vojvodina (Socialist Federal Republic of Yugoslavia)

=== Finals ===
Serbia (Socialist Republic of Serbia)	1 - 0	JNA (Socialist Federal Republic of Yugoslavia)

- competition top scorer: Stjepan Bobek (JNA) - 8 goals from 3 matches

=== Champions ===
SERBIA

(Coach: Svetozar Glišović)

Srđan Mrkušić
Ljubomir Lovrić
Miomir Petrović
Miodrag Jovanović
Milovan Ćirić (c)
Ljubiša Filipović
Milan Krstić
Branko Stanković
Radovan Domaćin
Milivoje Đurđević
Kosta Tomašević
Jovan Jezerkić
Rajko Mitić
Nikola Perlić
Aleksandar Panić
Momčilo Šapinac
Vladimir Pečenčić
Đura Horvatinović
Miodrag Savić
D. Jovanović

== See also ==
- Yugoslav Cup
- Yugoslav League Championship
- Football Association of Yugoslavia
