= 1951 Yugoslav First League =

Annual soccer tournament

Prva savezna liga
- Season: 1951
- Champions: Red Star (1st title)
- Relegated: Spartak Subotica; Napredak Kruševac
- Top goalscorer: Kosta Tomašević (16)

The First Federal League of Yugoslavia of 1951 (Prva savezna liga Jugoslavije), colloquially known as the Yugoslav First League of 1951, was the highest tier football competition played in communist Yugoslavia during 1951.

== League table ==
Pos	Team	Pld	W	D	L	GF	GA	GR	Pts	Relegation
1	Red Star Belgrade (C)	22	17	1	4	50	21	2.381	35	
2	Dinamo Zagreb	22	16	3	3	45	19	2.368	35	
3	Hajduk Split	22	14	4	4	52	21	2.476	32	
4	Partizan	22	10	4	8	34	24	1.417	24	
5	BSK Belgrade	22	8	6	8	34	24	1.417	22	
6	Lokomotiva	22	7	6	9	32	34	0.941	20	
7	Sarajevo	22	6	8	8	25	39	0.641	20	
8	Vojvodina	22	8	3	11	26	30	0.867	19	
9	Borac Zagreb (Note: Borac Zagreb merged into NK Zagreb at the end of the season.)	22	7	4	11	30	33	0.909	18	
10	Mačva Šabac	22	6	5	11	25	33	0.758	17	
11	Spartak Subotica (R)	22	7	2	13	16	47	0.340	16	Relegation to Yugoslav Second League
12	Napredak Kruševac (R)	22	2	2	18	16	60	0.267	6	Relegation to Yugoslav Second League

Source: rsssf.org
Rules for classification: 1st points; 2nd goal average.
(C) Champions; (R) Relegated

== Results ==
Home \ Away	BZG	BSK	DIN	HAJ	LOK	MAČ	NAP	PAR	RSB	SAR	SPA	VOJ
Borac Zagreb		1–0	0–1	1–5	1–1	4–0	8–1	2–1	0–1	1–1	1–0	3–2
BSK Belgrade	4–3		2–2	3–0	0–1	2–0	1–2	1–4	0–1	1–1	5–0	0–3
Dinamo Zagreb	2–1	0–0		3–0	3–2	2–0	5–1	2–0	1–2	1–3	4–0	3–1
Hajduk Split	4–1	1–0	3–1		4–1	3–1	5–1	2–0	3–2	4–1	7–0	1–0
Lokomotiva	1–2	1–0	1–4	1–1		1–1	4–1	0–3	1–3	4–2	5–0	0–1
Mačva Šabac	0–0	0–6	0–1	0–0	1–2		3–0	0–1	0–2	5–0	0–0	3–1
Napredak Kruševac	1–0	0–2	0–1	0–6	2–2	0–3		1–2	0–1	1–1	0–1	1–4
Partizan	1–0	2–2	0–0	0–0	2–0	0–3	3–0		6–1	1–2	5–2	1–1
Red Star	3–0	2–2	0–2	1–0	3–1	1–2	3–2	2–0		4–0	6–0	1–0
Sarajevo	1–1	0–0	2–4	1–1	0–0	2–0	3–2	1–0	1–3		1–1	2–1
Spartak Subotica	2–0	0–1	1–2	0–1	0–3	3–1	1–0	2–1	0–2	1–0		1–2
Vojvodina	1–0	0–2	0–1	3–1	0–0	2–2	1–0	0–1	0–6	3–0	0–1	

Source: DataSoccer.it
Legend: Blue = home team win; Yellow = draw; Red = away team win.

== Winning squad ==
Champions:

- RED STAR BELGRADE (coach: Ljubiša Broćić, replaced by Žarko Mihajlović)

players (league matches/league goals):

- Tihomir Ognjanov (22/10)
- Bela Palfi (22/1)
- Predrag Đajić (22/1)
- Kosta Tomašević (21/16)
- Jovan Jezerkić (18/6)
- Rajko Mitić (17/5)
- Milorad Diskić (16/0)
- Ivan Zvekanović (14/0)
- Ljubomir Lovrić (14/0) -goalkeeper-
- Branko Stanković (13/1)
- Dimitrije Tadić (12/0)
- Siniša Zlatković (11/4)
- Todor Živanović (10/4)
- Milivoje Đurđević (9/0)
- Srđan Mrkušić (8/0) -goalkeeper-
- Branislav Vukosavljević (7/1)
- Bora Kostić (3/1)
- Branko Nešović (1/0)
- Lajčo Kujundžić (1/0)
- Pavle Radić (1/0)

== Top scorers ==
Rank	Player	Club	Goals
1	(Socialist Federal Republic of Yugoslavia) Kosta Tomašević	Red Star	16
2	(Socialist Federal Republic of Yugoslavia) Frane Matošić	Hajduk Split	13
3	(Socialist Federal Republic of Yugoslavia) Vladimir Firm	Lokomotiva	11
4.	(Socialist Federal Republic of Yugoslavia) Tihomir Ognjanov	Red Star	10
4.	(Socialist Federal Republic of Yugoslavia) Dionizije Dvornić	Dinamo Zagreb	10
4.	(Socialist Federal Republic of Yugoslavia) Stane Krstulović	Hajduk Split	10
7	(Socialist Federal Republic of Yugoslavia) Božidar Senčar	Dinamo Zagreb	9
7	(Socialist Federal Republic of Yugoslavia) Stjepan Bobek	Partizan	9
7	(Socialist Federal Republic of Yugoslavia) Marko Valok	Partizan	9
7	(Socialist Federal Republic of Yugoslavia) Branko Zebec	Borac Zagreb	9
7	(Socialist Federal Republic of Yugoslavia) Bogdan Kovačević	Mačva	9

== See also ==
- 1951 Yugoslav Second League
- 1951 Yugoslav Cup
