= Cune Gojković =

Cune Gojković may refer to:

- Predrag Gojković (1932–2017), Serbian singer
- Jovan Gojković (1975–2001), Serbian footballer
