= Stjepan Bobek =

Croatian footballer (1923–2010)

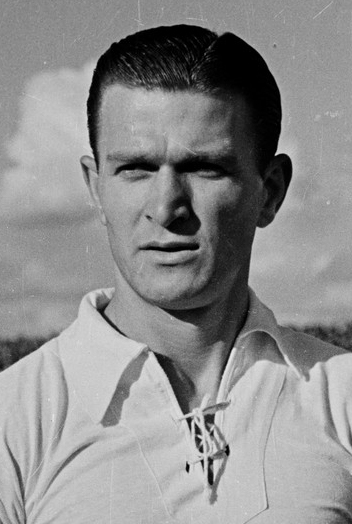
- Bobek in 1949

Personal information
- Date of birth: 3 December 1923
- Place of birth: Zagreb, Kingdom of Serbs, Croats and Slovenes
- Date of death: 22 August 2010 (aged 86)
- Place of death: Belgrade, Serbia
- Position: Forward

Youth career
- 1936–1938: HŠK Derbi
- 1938–1942: ŠK Zagreb
- 1942–1944: HŠK Ličanin

Senior career*
Years	Team	Apps	(Gls)
1944–1945	Građanski Zagreb	15	(13)
1945	Yugoslav Army	3	(8)
1945–1959	Partizan	198	(121)
Total		216	(142)

International career
1942–1945	Croatia U21	1	(0)
1946–1956	Yugoslavia	63	(38)

Managerial career
- 1959: Legia Warsaw
- 1960–1963: Partizan
- 1963–1967: Panathinaikos
- 1967–1969: Partizan
- 1969–1970: Olympiacos
- 1970: Altay
- 1970–1972: Galenika Zemun
- 1972: Dinamo Zagreb
- 1973–1974: Galenika Zemun
- 1974–1975: Panathinaikos
- 1975–1976: Panetolikos
- 1976–1978: Espérance
- 1978–1982: Vardar
Medal record
Men's Football
Representing Yugoslavia
Olympic Games
Silver medal – second place	1948 London	Team
Silver medal – second place	1952 Helsinki	Team
- * Club domestic league appearances and goals

Stjepan Bobek (pronounced [stjêpaːn bǒbek]; 3 December 1923 – 22 August 2010) was a Yugoslav and Croatian professional football striker and later football manager.

Usually a forward or attacking midfielder, Bobek was renowned for his technique, vision and goalscoring ability and is commonly regarded as one of Yugoslavia's greatest players. He is remembered for his time at Belgrade's Partizan, where he moved to following the end of World War II. He played for Partizan between 1945 and 1959 helping them win two Yugoslav First League titles and four Yugoslav Cups, and was named the club's greatest player in history in 1995. Internationally, he is the second all-time top scorer for the Yugoslavia national team, scoring 38 goals in 63 appearances between 1946 and 1956, and was member of Yugoslav squads which won two Olympic silver medals (in 1948 and 1952) and played in two FIFA World Cups (in 1950 and 1954).

After retiring from active football in 1959, he was a successful manager, winning Yugoslav and Greek national titles with Partizan and Panathinaikos.

== Club career ==
Bobek was born in Zagreb and started playing at the age of 13 for Viktorija, a lower league club, using his brother's registration papers. When he was 20 he became the center-forward of Građanski Zagreb.

He was the top scorer of the Yugoslav First League twice, in 1945 (8 goals) and 1954 (21 goals).

=== Partizan ===
Bobek joined Partizan shortly after the club's founding in October 1945 and remained with the team until his retirement in 1959. During his time in Partizan, he played 468 games and scored 403 goals, still holding the club record. Bobek won two Yugoslav League titles and the Yugoslav Cup four times.

He scored his first goals in official matches, on 1 September 1946, in the 2nd leg of the Yugoslav First League. He scored twice in a 6–1 home victory over Budućnost. On 5 January 1947, Bobek scored his first goal, in his first Eternal derby against Red Star Belgrade, in a 3–4 home defeat. That was also the first goal in the Derby scored by Partizan player, because the previous two were own goals. On 8 June 1947 in a league match played in Niš between 14. Oktobar and Partizan (1–10), Bobek scored eight goals – an absolute record that has never been broken until the end of Yugoslav First League or its successor leagues. He scored 25 goals in 22 matches in his first season of First League of SFR Yugoslavia and also won his first title.

In May 1951, Partizan played three friendly matches in England. The first match was played on 9 May, against Hull City and Partizan beat them 3–2. Bobek scored two goals in that victory. Three days later he again played brilliantly and scored a goal in Partizan's second victory over English teams. The result was the same three days later against Middlesbrough. One month later, he scored twice in one of the biggest victories in Eternal Derby, in a 6–1 home victory over Red Star. In November of that year, Bobek scored a six goals against Sloboda Titovo Užice, in a qualifying round of Yugoslav Cup, in a 11–1 away victory. A week later, he also set a record in the Yugoslav Cup. He scored eight goals in 15–0 home victory over Sloga Petrovac.

On 29 November 1952, Bobek scored a goal in a 6–0 victory over a arch rival Red Star Belgrade in the final of the Yugoslav Cup. A three weeks before, he scored a hat-trick in a 4–0 home victory over one of the best German teams at that time – 1. FC Köln.

Bobek continued with great performances in following seasons. He scored a goal in biggest victory ever in Eternal Derby. After four minutes, he scored first goal on the match, in a 7–1 home victory over Red Star, on 6 December 1953. On 11 April 1954, he scored four goals in 8–0 home league victory over Rabotnički.

Two years later after winning second Yugoslav Cup, he won a third. Again Partizan beat Red Star, but this time 4–1 and Bobek again scored one goal.

On 4 September 1955, Bobek scored a goal in first ever match of European Cup. Partizan draw (3–3) with Sporting CP, in Lisbon. He played all four matches in the 1955–56 European Cup including a legendary victory 3–0 over Real Madrid in the quarter-finals.

== International career ==
Bobek played for Croatia U21 in its only match against Slovakia U21 in September 1942. He made his debut for the Yugoslavia national team on 9 May 1946, in a 2–0 win over Czechoslovakia at the Letná Stadium, which was the nation's inaugural match as SFR Yugoslavia. He scored his first international goal against the same opponents on 29 September 1946, in a 4–2 win at the JNA Stadium.

Bobek won two Olympic silver medals for Yugoslavia, scoring four goals in London 1948 and three in Helsinki 1952. He also appeared at the 1950 and 1954 FIFA World Cups, scoring once in a 1950 4–1 win over Mexico.

On 17 October 1954, Bobek scored a hat-trick in a 5–1 win over Turkey, which were also his last goals on international duty. He reached 38 goals for Yugoslavia on that day and became the national side's top scorer, surpassing Blagoje Marjanović's 37-goal tally. Bobek's record stood for over 66 years, until it was beaten by Serbia's Aleksandar Mitrović on 27 March 2021.

== Managerial career ==
After retiring from active playing Bobek went into management. In 1959 he became the coach of Legia Warsaw in Poland, moving back to Yugoslavia the next season to manage Partizan. He won three successive Yugoslav league championships with Partizan (1961, 1962, 1963) before being replaced by Kiril Simonovski in 1963.

In 1963 Bobek moved to Greece where he spent four years at the helm of Panathinaikos. He led the club to two Greek championship titles, including the first undefeated season for any Greek club, in the 1963–64 season.

Bobek returned to Yugoslavia and again took over Partizan, finishing second in the Yugoslav league in the 1967–68 season and third in 1968–69. After that, he returned to Greece to manage Olympiacos, spending ten months at the club. He briefly worked in Turkey, and then took over the recently promoted Galenika Zemun in the Yugoslav second level.

He was then hired by Dinamo Zagreb for the 1972–73 season, but was sacked in November 1972 after only four months, with the club sitting at the bottom of the table, winning only two out of their first 13 games. During the 1974–75 season he returned to Panathinaikos for a second time, but without much success. He also coached Espérance ST in Tunisia, and his last managing job was at Vardar, with whom he won the 1978–79 Yugoslav Second League East Division title and promotion to the First League.

In 1995, he was named the all-time greatest player of Partizan. In 2009, Bobek's biography written by sports journalist Fredi Kramer was published.

== Death ==
Bobek died shortly after midnight on 22 August 2010 in Belgrade. He is interred in the Alley of Distinguished Citizens in the Belgrade New Cemetery.

== Career statistics ==
=== Club ===
Appearances and goals by club, season and competition
Club	Season	League			Continental		Total	
Club	Season	Division	Apps	Goals	Apps	Goals	Apps	Goals
Partizan	1946–47	Yugoslav First League	23	24	—		23	24
Partizan	1947–48	Yugoslav First League	12	4	—		12	4
Partizan	1948–49	Yugoslav First League	17	13	—		17	13
Partizan	1950	Yugoslav First League	17	6	—		17	6
Partizan	1951	Yugoslav First League	21	9	—		21	9
Partizan	1952	Yugoslav First League	9	9	—		9	9
Partizan	1952–53	Yugoslav First League	12	7	—		12	7
Partizan	1953–54	Yugoslav First League	23	21	—		23	21
Partizan	1954–55	Yugoslav First League	18	16	—		18	16
Partizan	1955–56	Yugoslav First League	17	9	4	1	21	10
Partizan	1956–57	Yugoslav First League	15	3	—		15	3
Partizan	1957–58	Yugoslav First League	9	0	—		9	0
Partizan	1958–59	Yugoslav First League	5	0	—		5	0
Career total			198	121	4	1	202	122

=== International ===
Scores and results list Yugoslavia's goal tally first, score column indicates score after each Bobek goal.

List of international goals scored by Stjepan Bobek
No.	Date	Venue	Opponent	Score	Result	Competition
1	29 September 1946	Belgrade, Yugoslavia	Czechoslovakia	4–1	4–2	Friendly
2	7 October 1946	Tirana, Albania	Albania	2–2	3–2	1946 Balkan Cup
3	11 May 1947	Prague, Czechoslovakia	Czechoslovakia	1–2	1–3	Friendly
4	22 June 1947	Bucharest, Romania	Romania	1–0	3–1	1947 Balkan Cup
5	22 June 1947	Bucharest, Romania	Romania	3–1	3–1	1947 Balkan Cup
6	14 September 1947	Tirana, Albania	Albania	1–1	4–2	1947 Balkan Cup
7	19 October 1947	Belgrade, Yugoslavia	Poland	2–0	7–1	Friendly
8	19 October 1947	Belgrade, Yugoslavia	Poland	7–0	7–1	Friendly
9	31 July 1948	London, England	Luxembourg	6–1	6–1	1948 Summer Olympics
10	5 August 1948	London, England	Turkey	2–1	3–1	1948 Summer Olympics
11	11 August 1948	London, England	United Kingdom	1–0	3–1	1948 Summer Olympics
12	13 August 1948	London, England	Sweden	1–1	1–3	1948 Summer Olympics
13	19 June 1949	Oslo, Norway	Norway	2–1	3–1	Friendly
14	21 August 1949	Belgrade, Yugoslavia	Israel	6–0	6–0	1950 FIFA World Cup qualification
15	18 September 1949	Tel Aviv, Israel	Israel	2–0	5–2	1950 FIFA World Cup qualification
16	30 October 1949	Paris, France	France	1–1	1–1	1950 FIFA World Cup qualification
17	13 November 1949	Belgrade, Yugoslavia	Austria	2–3	2–5	Friendly
18	11 June 1950	Bern, Switzerland	Switzerland	3–0	4–0	Friendly
19	29 June 1950	Porto Alegre, Brazil	Mexico	1–0	4–1	1950 FIFA World Cup
20	7 September 1950	Helsinki, Finland	Finland	1–0	2–3	Friendly
21	10 September 1950	Copenhagen, Denmark	Denmark	2–0	4–1	Friendly
22	24 June 1951	Belgrade, Yugoslavia	Switzerland	1–0	7–3	Friendly
23	24 June 1951	Belgrade, Yugoslavia	Switzerland	6–0	7–3	Friendly
24	23 August 1951	Oslo, Norway	Norway	2–0	4–2	Friendly
25	23 August 1951	Oslo, Norway	Norway	4–0	4–2	Friendly
26	2 September 1951	Belgrade, Yugoslavia	Sweden	1–1	2–1	Friendly
27	20 July 1952	Tampere, Finland	Soviet Union	4–0	5–5	1952 Summer Olympics
28	22 July 1952	Tampere, Finland	Soviet Union	2–1	3–1	1952 Summer Olympics
29	25 July 1952	Helsinki, Finland	Denmark	4–1	5–3	1952 Summer Olympics
30	21 September 1952	Belgrade, Yugoslavia	Austria	1–0	4–2	Friendly
31	21 September 1952	Belgrade, Yugoslavia	Austria	2–0	4–2	Friendly
32	21 September 1952	Belgrade, Yugoslavia	Austria	4–2	4–2	Friendly
33	21 December 1952	Ludwigshafen, West Germany	West Germany	2–1	2–3	Friendly
34	26 September 1954	Saarbrücken, Saarland	Saar	2–1	5–1	Friendly
35	3 October 1954	Vienna, Austria	Austria	2–1	2–2	Friendly
36	17 October 1954	Sarajevo, Yugoslavia	Turkey	1–0	5–1	Friendly
37	17 October 1954	Sarajevo, Yugoslavia	Turkey	2–0	5–1	Friendly
38	17 October 1954	Sarajevo, Yugoslavia	Turkey	4–0	5–1	Friendly

== Managerial statistics ==
Managerial record by team and tenure
Team	From	To	Record							
Team	From	To	G	W	D	L	GF	GA	GD	Win %
Legia Warsaw	15 April 1959	31 December 1959	22	8	9	5	31	29	+2	36.36
Partizan	1 July 1960	29 April 1963	80	45	16	19	168	98	+70	56.25
Panathinaikos	1 July 1963	30 June 1967	145	99	30	16	321	109	+212	68.28
Partizan	1 July 1967	30 June 1969	73	32	25	16	115	81	+34	43.84
Olympiacos	1 August 1969	30 June 1970	40	24	9	7	60	30	+30	60.00
Altay	1 July 1970	28 December 1970	13	4	3	6	8	12	−4	30.77
Dinamo Zagreb	1 July 1972	20 December 1972	17	4	5	8	10	19	−9	23.53
Galenika Zemun	1 July 1973	30 June 1974	34	10	7	17	32	44	−12	29.41
Panathinaikos	5 September 1974	30 June 1975	41	19	12	10	71	46	+25	46.34
Panetolikos	1 July 1975	30 June 1976	33	5	13	15	22	50	−28	15.15
Espérance	1 August 1976	30 June 1978	54	20	17	17	83	70	+13	37.04
Vardar	1 July 1978	30 June 1982	138	52	42	44	194	175	+19	37.68
Career total			690	322	188	180	1,115	763	+352	46.67

== Honours ==
=== Player ===
Partizan

- Yugoslav First League: 1946–47, 1948–49
- Yugoslav Cup: 1947, 1952, 1954, 1956–57

Yugoslavia

- Olympic Silver Medal: 1948, 1952
- Balkan Cup runner-up: 1946 and 1947

Individual

- Yugoslav First League top scorer: 1945, 1953–54
- FK Partizan Magnificent Eleven (1995)
- FK Partizan Best player in club history (1995)

Records

- Yugoslavia all-time top scorer: 38 goals

=== Manager ===
Partizan

- Yugoslav First League: 1960–61, 1961–62, 1962–63

Panathinaikos

- Alpha Ethniki: 1963–64, 1964–65
- Greek Cup: 1967

Vardar

- Yugoslav Second League: 1978–79
