= 1946–47 Yugoslav First League =

Prva savezna liga
- Season: 1946–47
- Champions: Partizan (1st title)
- Relegated: Kvarner; Budućnost; Željezničar; 14. Oktobar; Nafta
- Top goalscorer: Franjo Wölfl (28)

The 1946–47 Yugoslav First League season was the first season of the First Federal League (Serbo-Croatian Latin: Prva savezna liga), the top level association football competition of SFR Yugoslavia, which ended the six-year period in which national football competitions were suspended due to World War II. It was also the first season in which the Football Association of Yugoslavia (FSJ) introduced the modern league system which included promotion and relegation between tiers of the football pyramid, as pre-war national championships held between 1927 and 1940 during Kingdom of Yugoslavia employed either a play-off tournament or a mini league format contested by regional champions.

In 1946 both the First and Second Leagues began to use a season long derby to determine the league champion, and an elimination cup to feature a secondary cup champion. With Partizan dominating the league, and then winning the cup shortly after, they are the first ever "double champion" of the Yugoslav First League.

== Teams ==
Team	Location	Federal Republic	Method of qualification
14. Oktobar^{[A]}	Niš	(Socialist Republic of Serbia) PR Serbia	Serbian championship runners-up
Budućnost	Titograd	(Socialist Republic of Montenegro) PR Montenegro	Montenegrin championship winners
Dinamo Zagreb	Zagreb	(Socialist Republic of Croatia) PR Croatia	Croatian championship runners-up
Hajduk Split	Split	(Socialist Republic of Croatia) PR Croatia	Croatian championship winners
Kvarner	Rijeka	(Socialist Federal Republic of Yugoslavia) Istrian Zone B	Istrian-Fiuman play-off winners
Lokomotiva	Zagreb	(Socialist Republic of Croatia) PR Croatia	Croatian championship third place; play-off runners-up
Metalac	Belgrade	(Socialist Republic of Serbia) PR Serbia	Serbian championship third place; play-off winners
Nafta	Lendava	(Socialist Republic of Slovenia) PR Slovenia	Slovenian championship winners
Partizan	Belgrade	(Socialist Republic of Serbia) PR Serbia	Qualified directly, representing the Yugoslav People's Army
Pobeda	Skopje	(Socialist Republic of Macedonia) PR Macedonia	Macedonian championship winners
Ponziana	Trieste	Free Territory of Trieste	Qualified directly, representing Free Territory of Trieste
Red Star	Belgrade	(Socialist Republic of Serbia) PR Serbia	Serbian championship winners
Spartak	Subotica	(Socialist Republic of Serbia) PR Serbia	Vojvodina championship winners
Željezničar	Sarajevo	(Socialist Republic of Bosnia and Herzegovina) PR Bosnia and Herzegovina	Bosnia and Herzegovina championship winners

Notes

- ^{A} During the season, FK Železničar Niš merged with two other Niš-based clubs, Jedinstvo and Radnički, to form 14. Oktobar.

== League table ==
Pos	Team	Pld	W	D	L	GF	GA	GD	Pts	Relegation
1	Partizan (C)	26	23	1	2	77	17	+60	47	
2	Dinamo Zagreb	26	19	4	3	81	26	+55	42	
3	Red Star Belgrade	26	18	2	6	66	23	+43	38	
4	Hajduk Split	26	16	4	6	57	21	+36	36	
5	Metalac Belgrade	26	13	3	10	40	35	+5	29	
6	Spartak Subotica	26	11	6	9	40	34	+6	28	
7	Lokomotiva Zagreb	26	10	4	12	34	43	−9	24	
8	Pobeda Skopje	26	8	6	12	41	49	−8	22	Readmitted
9	Kvarner Rijeka (R)	26	7	7	12	27	42	−15	21	Relegation to Yugoslav Second League
10	Budućnost Titograd (R)	26	7	6	13	44	54	−10	20	Relegation to Yugoslav Second League
11	Ponziana Trieste (T)	26	9	2	15	35	50	−15	20	Readmitted (Note: Ponziana was relegated and later readmitted to First League for political reasons against Italy.)
12	Željezničar (R)	26	7	4	15	31	54	−23	18	Relegation to Yugoslav Second League
13	14. Oktobar Niš (R)	26	4	5	17	26	76	−50	13	Relegation to Yugoslav Second League
14	Nafta Lendava (R)	26	3	0	23	13	88	−75	6	Relegation to Yugoslav Second League

Source: RSSSF
(C) Champions; (R) Relegated; (T) Qualified, but not yet for the particular phase indicated

== Results ==
Home \ Away	OKT	BUD	DIN	HAJ	KVA	LOK	MET	NAF	PAR	POB	PON	RSB	SPA	ŽEL
14. Oktobar Niš		2–1	1–2	0–4	1–1	2–1	0–0	0–1	1–10	2–2	2–2	0–5	2–1	2–2
Budućnost	3–1		2–2	0–5	5–1	1–1	1–2	9–0	0–3	3–3	2–1	0–1	3–0	2–0
Dinamo Zagreb	3–1	7–1		0–1	2–1	4–0	3–1	3–0	4–2	5–0	5–2	2–2	3–0	9–1
Hajduk Split	4–0	1–1	2–1		1–0	4–0	2–0	3–0	0–1	3–2	3–2	5–0	5–0	3–0
Kvarner Rijeka	2–1	2–2	1–3	1–1		0–5	1–1	4–1	0–3	3–0	3–0	0–2	0–0	0–0
Lokomotiva	2–0	2–0	1–2	0–0	3–1		1–0	3–1	1–1	2–0	2–2	0–1	2–0	0–3
Metalac Belgrade	2–0	1–0	0–5	1–2	0–1	2–0		3–0	0–2	4–1	3–1	1–0	2–2	4–1
Nafta Lendava	0–3	2–0	0–6	1–3	0–3	0–3	1–3		0–2	1–2	0–3	0–3	0–6	2–1
Partizan	5–1	6–1	5–1	2–0	5–0	4–0	2–1	3–0		1–0	2–1	3–4	1–0	3–0
Pobeda Skopje	4–3	1–1	0–0	1–1	2–0	3–0	1–2	6–0	2–3		3–1	1–4	2–0	2–1
Ponziana	5–1	0–3	0–4	1–0	1–0	0–4	3–0	3–0	0–2	3–1		0–1	1–2	2–1
Red Star	8–0	3–1	0–1	2–1	2–0	4–0	1–3	6–0	0–1	3–0	5–0		0–0	6–1
Spartak Subotica	3–0	4–0	1–1	2–1	1–1	4–0	4–2	4–3	0–1	2–1	1–0	1–3		0–0
Željezničar	3–0	3–2	1–3	3–2	0–1	4–1	0–2	3–0	0–4	1–1	0–1	2–0	0–2	

Source: DataSoccer.it
Legend: Blue = home team win; Yellow = draw; Red = away team win.

== Top scorers ==
Rank	Player	Club	Goals
1	(Socialist Federal Republic of Yugoslavia) Franjo Wölfl	Dinamo Zagreb	28
2	(Socialist Federal Republic of Yugoslavia) Stjepan Bobek	Partizan	26
3	(Socialist Federal Republic of Yugoslavia) Kosta Tomašević	Red Star	16
3	(Socialist Federal Republic of Yugoslavia) Frane Matošić	Hajduk Split	16
5	(Socialist Federal Republic of Yugoslavia) Antun Habić	Lokomotiva (8) / Budućnost (7)	15
6	(Socialist Federal Republic of Yugoslavia) Dragan Georgijevski	Pobeda Skopje	14
7	(Socialist Federal Republic of Yugoslavia) Jovan Jezerkić	Red Star	13
8	(Socialist Federal Republic of Yugoslavia) Franjo Rupnik	Partizan	12
8	(Socialist Federal Republic of Yugoslavia) Josip Prčić	Spartak Subotica	12
8	(Socialist Federal Republic of Yugoslavia) Aleksandar Petrović	14. Oktobar	12
