= Rajko Grčević =

Yugoslav footballer

Personal information
- Full name: Rajko Grčević
- Place of birth: Šibenik, Kingdom of Yugoslavia
- Position: Goalkeeper

Youth career
- 1946–1952: Hajduk Split

Senior career*
Years	Team	Apps	(Gls)
1946–1948	Šibenik		
1948–1950	Partizan	5	(0)
1950–1954	Lokomotiva Zagreb	33	(0)
1954–1955	Odred Ljubljana		
- * Club domestic league appearances and goals

Rajko Grčević is a Yugoslav former football goalkeeper.

== Club career ==
Born in Šibenik, he started playing in local HNK Šibenik from where he transferred to FK Partizan in 1948 where he played as a reserve goalkeeper for the next two seasons. In 1950 he moved to NK Lokomotiva where he got the spot of main goalkeeper and stayed there until 1954 when he moved to Odred Ljubljana where he finished his career.

He joined Partizan in December 1947 and stayed until November 1950. He played mostly at friendlies and for the reserve team, and made five league appearances for the first team. He couldn't play more as the main goalkeeper at Partizan at that time was the national team goalkeeper Franjo Šoštarić. In total Grčević played 116 times for Partizan, of which 5 were in league and one in Yugoslav Cup.
