= Todor Živanović =

Yugoslav footballer

Personal information
- Date of birth: 27 September 1927
- Place of birth: Valjevo, Kingdom of Serbs, Croats and Slovenes
- Date of death: 20 June 1978 (aged 50)
- Place of death: Belgrade, SFR Yugoslavia
- Position: Forward

Senior career*
Years	Team	Apps	(Gls)
1948–1949	Metalac Valjevo		
1950	BSK	11	(2)
1951–1956	Red Star Belgrade	71	(45)
Total		82	(47)

International career
1950	Yugoslavia	5	(3)
- * Club domestic league appearances and goals

Todor Živanović (Serbian Cyrillic: Тодор Живановић; 27 September 1927 – 20 June 1978) was a Serbian football player and a Yugoslav international.

== Playing career ==
=== Club ===
Born near Valjevo in present-day Serbia, Živanović first began playing for the small third level side FK Metalac Valjevo in the 1948–49 season. He then briefly joined top-level side BSK with whom he spent the 1950 Yugoslav First League season, before moving on to local giants Red Star Belgrade in 1951.

His six-year spell at Red Star was the most successful period of his career, during which he won the 1951, 1952–53 and 1955–56 national titles. He was also the league's top goalscorer in the 1952–53 season, with 17 goals in 21 league appearances.

=== International ===
He was also capped for the Yugoslavia national football team five times in 1950, all in friendlies. His debut came on 3 September 1950 in a 1–2 defeat against Sweden in Stockholm, in which manager Milorad Arsenijević sent him in instead of Marko Valok in the 74th minute. His last game for the national team came on 22 November against England at Highbury, in which he scored to make it 2–2, which was the final result.

Živković retired from playing in 1956, and died on 20 June 1978 in Belgrade.
