= Branko Nešović =

Serbian footballer and doctor (1930–2002)

Personal information
- Date of birth: 11 July 1930
- Place of birth: Belgrade, Kingdom of Yugoslavia
- Date of death: 23 November 2002 (aged 72)
- Place of death: Ivanjica, FR Yugoslavia
- Position: Defender

Senior career*
Years	Team	Apps	(Gls)
1946–1958	Red Star Belgrade		
- * Club domestic league appearances and goals

Branko Nešović (Serbian Cyrillic: Бранко Нешовић; 11 July 1930 – 23 November 2002) was a Serbian footballer who played as a defender for Red Star Belgrade. He later became a doctor and was the team doctor during Red Star Belgrade's famed 1991 European Cup final. Nešović died on 23 November 2002.
