= Rajko Mitić =

Serbian footballer (1922–2008)

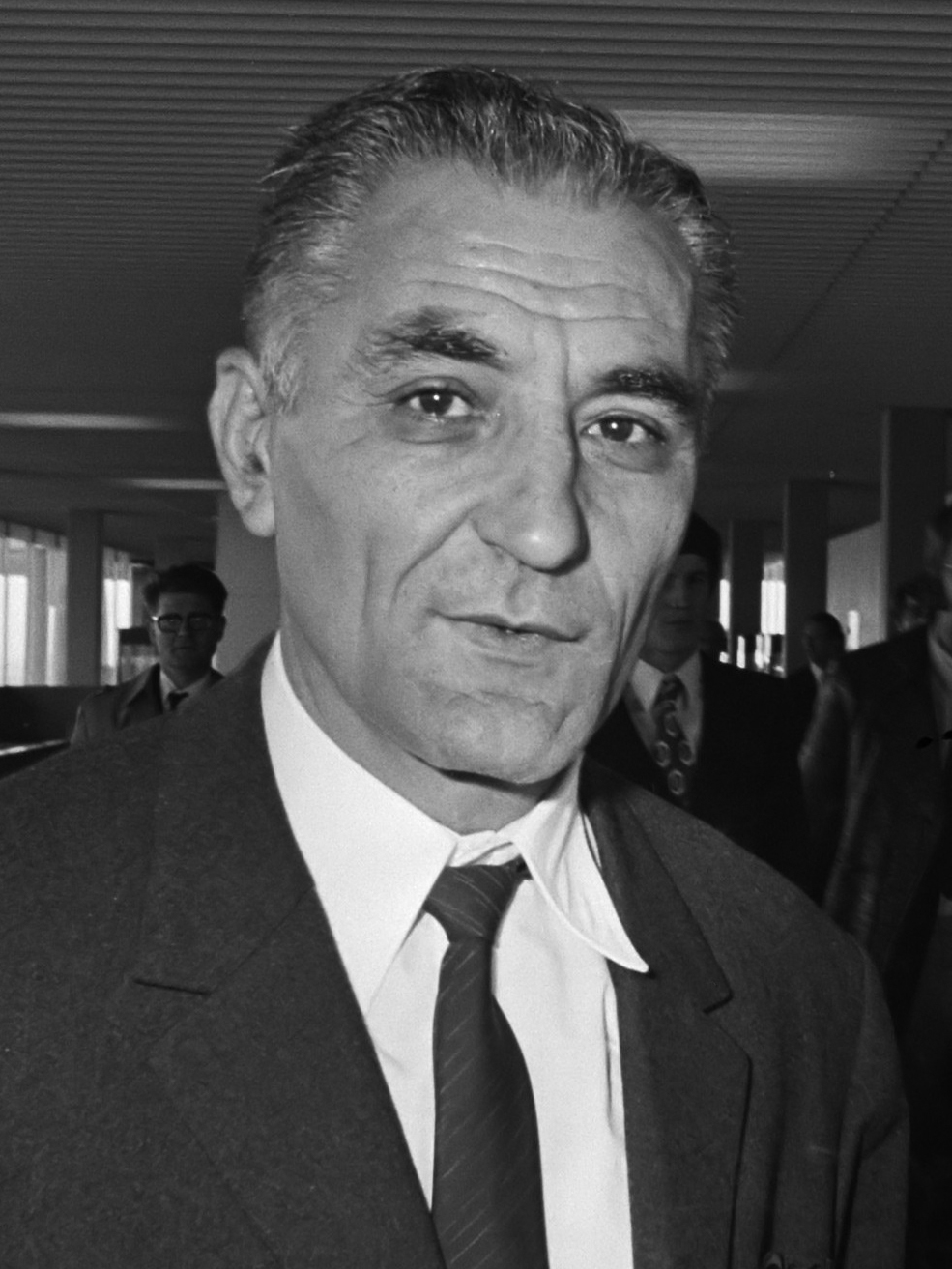
- Mitić as Yugoslavia's head coach in 1970

Personal information
- Date of birth: 19 November 1922
- Place of birth: Bela Palanka, Kingdom of Serbs, Croats and Slovenes
- Date of death: 29 March 2008 (aged 85)
- Place of death: Belgrade, Serbia
- Position: Forward

Youth career
- 1937: Košutnjak
- 1938–1940: BSK Beograd

Senior career*
Years	Team	Apps	(Gls)
1940–1944	BSK Beograd		
1945–1958	Red Star Belgrade	220	(72)

International career
1946–1957	Yugoslavia	59	(32)

Managerial career
- 1966–1970: Yugoslavia
Medal record
Representing Yugoslavia (as player)
Olympic Games
Runner-up	1948 London	Team
Runner-up	1952 Helsinki	Team
Representing Yugoslavia (as head coach)
UEFA European Championship
Runner-up	1968 Italy
- * Club domestic league appearances and goals

Rajko Mitić (Serbian Cyrillic: Рајко Митић, pronounced [rǎːjko mǐːtitɕ]; 19 November 1922 – 29 March 2008) was a Serbian footballer, coach, executive and journalist.

A former forward, Mitić is considered one of the most important players in the history of Red Star Belgrade as he is the first out of only five players to have been awarded the Zvezdina zvezda.

In December 2014, Red Star Stadium, the principal stadium in Serbia, was officially renamed after him.

== Club career ==
=== Košutnjak and BSK ===
Before becoming the first successful player of Red Star Belgrade, Mitić started his career in 1937 on the football fields of Košutnjak. In May 1938, he was transferred to BSK Belgrade where he played from 1938–1944. For BSK, he became a member of the junior team of the then-champion. Two years later, in 1940, he had his debut as a striker for the first team, where he scored two goals.

The Second World War halted his football development, but he continued playing in 1944 for the engineer squadron under which he fought along with fellow future Yugoslavia national team players Predrag Đajić and Jovan Jezerkić.

=== Red Star Belgrade ===
Short after Red Star Belgrade was founded on 4 March 1945, Mitić became the captain of the team, and wore the red and white uniform for fourteen seasons. In Red Star's uniform, he scored 262 goals in 572 matches in total. His popularity in the early fifties surpassed Belgrade and reached out to other cities and towns as well.

As captain and leader of the team, he won five league titles (1951, 1953, 1956, 1957, and 1959) together with 1 Serbian National championship in 1945 (making it six in total) and four national cup titles (1948, 1949, 1950, and 1958). He also won regional Mitropa Cup in 1958 being first of two that Red star won. One of his fondest memories was the first Yugoslav championship title, won in a dramatic finish, when the first place Dinamo Zagreb lost their lead by slipping in the last three rounds. This allowed Red Star to win by a better goal ratio of 0.018 goals. He almost never missed a match, except in 1947, when he had to go to rehabilitation after a knee meniscus operation.

As captain, he most frequently reminisced of Red Star's match on 7 April 1957 against Hajduk in Split, when he pulled the entire team off the pitch in the 71st minute (with the result at 1–1) after a stone thrown from a disgruntled Red Star fan in the stands hit Bora Kostić in the head. The disciplinary committee of the Football Association of Yugoslavia suspended all the players of Red Star (except Vladimir Beara and Kostić) for a month. The club did not appeal against the decision, and Rajko Mitić made the most positive impression possible on the shocked football public.

He was noted for his emphasis on fair play, avoiding actions such as pulling opponents' shirts or deliberately tripping them. While other players of his era were also recognized for their technical ability, Rajko Mitić was distinguished for his conduct on and off the field, particularly his sportsmanship and interpersonal qualities.

On 29 November 1958, he officially retired from football at the age of 36, after Red Star's convincing Cup win of 4–0 against Velež.

== International career ==
For Yugoslavia, Mitić won 59 caps (in which he was captain 34 times), and scored 32 goals. He scored his first goal for the national team in his debut on 9 May 1946 in Prague, when Yugoslavia outplayed Czechoslovakia 2–0. In his national team career, he scored three hat-tricks. The first against Denmark in 1950 (the final score being 5–1), the second against India in 1952 (10–1), and finally in Belgrade against Wales (5–2) in 1953.

He often said that he never missed a chance to remind himself of his favourite goal in the national team uniform, against England in Belgrade, in 1954. Yugoslavia won 1–0 as Mitić scored the decisive goal in the dying minutes of the match.

He took part in two Olympic tournaments: London 1948 and Helsinki 1952, where he captained the Yugoslavia squad that included many notable players of that era. He earned the silver medal both times. There were two dramatic matches against the Soviet Union (in the second of which Mitić scored the first goal, and paved the way for an important 3–1 win). He also took part in two World Cups (Brazil 1950 and Switzerland 1954), but none of these were pleasant. Before the match against Brazil at the Maracanã in Rio de Janeiro, while he was entering the pitch from the tunnel, he lifted his head suddenly and hit a medal lid. Due to the large cut and bleeding, he was forced to ask for medical attention and couldn't play the first 20 minutes of the match, so he didn't see Ademir's goal in the 3rd minute and wasn't aware of Brazil's lead until he was informed of it by his teammates during halftime. Since, in those days, there were no substitutions, the team was handicapped and finally lost the match 2–0.

He celebrated his 50th match with the national team during the 1954 World Cup against West Germany (who went on to become World Champion), but lost 2–0. He played his last match for the national team on 29 November 1957, in Bucharest against Romania, as a 35-year-old striker. The final score of the match was 1–1.

== Post-playing career, death and legacy ==
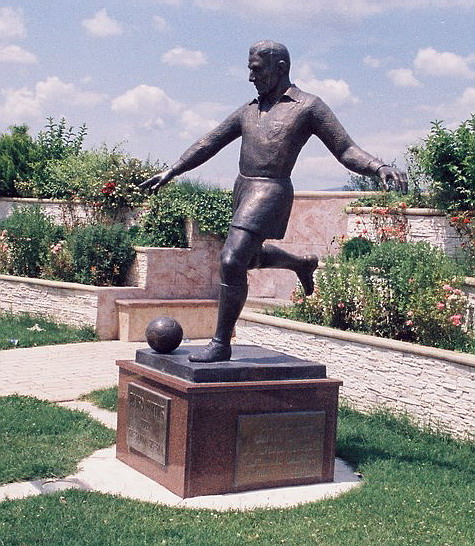
The Rajko Mitić Monument in Bela Palanka, Serbia

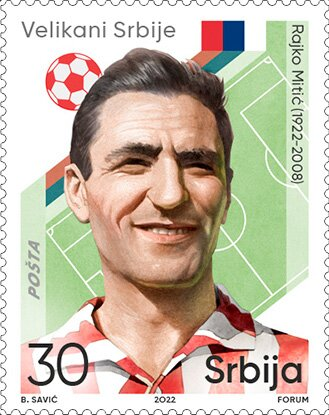
Mitić on a 2022 stamp of Serbia

He was part of the coaching staff at Red Star from 1960 until 1966 when he became a member of the national team selection committee which consisted of Mitić and Aleksandar Tirnanić, Miljan Miljanić, Vujadin Boškov and Branko Stanković. In 1967, he was promoted to head coach of the national team and he remained in that role until 1970. His biggest achievement as a coach was at the 1968 UEFA European Football Championship held in Italy, when the national team (led by Dragan Džajić) won the silver medal.

When he retired in 1983, he applied himself actively as a volunteer in Red Star. He was a member of the team's leadership for a long time (including two mandates as vice president of the club).

Even as an active player in the early fifties, he was a sportswriter for the daily newspaper Sport. Later on, for a long series of years until his retirement, he wrote for the weekly sports magazine Tempo.

In a 2006 interview, fellow Red Star legend Dragoslav Šekularac was critical of Red Star's forgetting of Mitić in his later years.

Mitic died on 29 March 2008, aged 85. He was interred in a family plot in the Belgrade New Cemetery on 2 April 2008.

Until his death, he was active in the Council of Veterans together with the stars from his and later generations. Mitić is considered one of the most important players in the history of Red Star as he is the first out of only five players to have been awarded the Zvezdina zvezda. In December 2014, Red Star Stadium, the principal stadium in Belgrade, was officially renamed after him.

== Career statistics ==
Appearances and goals by club, season and competition
Club	Season	League			Serbian Cup		Continental		Total	
Club	Season	Division	Apps	Goals	Apps	Goals	Apps	Goals	Apps	Goals
Red Star Belgrade	1946–47	Prva Liga	9	4						
Red Star Belgrade	1947–48	Prva Liga	18	2						
Red Star Belgrade	1948–49	Prva Liga	16	6						
Red Star Belgrade	1949–50	Prva Liga	18	11						
Red Star Belgrade	1950–51	Prva Liga	17	5						
Red Star Belgrade	1951–52	Prva Liga	13	8						
Red Star Belgrade	1952–53	Prva Liga	18	8						
Red Star Belgrade	1953–54	Prva Liga	18	5						
Red Star Belgrade	1954–55	Prva Liga	17	7						
Red Star Belgrade	1955–56	Prva Liga	25	4						
Red Star Belgrade	1956–57	Prva Liga	21	4						
Red Star Belgrade	1957–58	Prva Liga	19	6						
Red Star Belgrade	1958–59	Prva Liga	11	2						
Red Star Belgrade	Total		220	72						
