= Franjo Šoštarić =

Yugoslav footballer

Personal information
- Date of birth: 1 August 1919
- Place of birth: Zagreb, Kingdom of Serbs, Croats and Slovenes
- Date of death: 27 August 1975 (aged 56)
- Place of death: Belgrade, SR Serbia, SFR Yugoslavia
- Position: Goalkeeper

Senior career*
Years	Team	Apps	(Gls)
1940–1942	HAŠK		
1943–1945	Građanski Zagreb	4	(0)
1946–1952	Partizan	84	(0)

International career
1946–1951	Yugoslavia	18	(0)
Medal record
Men's Football
Representing Yugoslavia
Olympic Games
Silver medal – second place	1948 London	Team
- * Club domestic league appearances and goals

Franjo Šoštarić (1 August 1919 – 27 August 1975) was a Croatian footballer who competed internationally for Yugoslavia.

== Club career ==
Born in Zagreb, he started playing with HAŠK before moving to Građanski Zagreb in 1942 where he became the substitute of Franjo Glaser for the following 3 seasons. With Građanski he won one Croatian championship and two championships of the Zagreb Subassociation.

In 1945 he moved to Belgrade and joined FK Partizan where he would play until 1949 making a total of 239 appearances (84 of which in the league) and win two Yugoslav championships, in 1947 and 1949, and one Yugoslav Cup, in 1947.

== International career ==
Šoštarić made his debut for Yugoslavia in an October 1946 Balkan Cup match against Romania and earned a total of 18 caps, scoring no goals. He was part of the Yugoslav squad at the 1948 Summer Olympics where Yugoslavia won the silver. His final international was a June 1951 friendly match against Switzerland.

== Honours ==
=== Club ===
Građanski Zagreb

- Croatian championship: 1943

Partizan

- Yugoslav First League: 1946–47, 1948–49
- Yugoslav Cup: 1947

=== National team ===
Yugoslavia

- 1948 Summer Olympics: Silver
