= Jovan Gojković =

Serbian footballer

Personal information
- Full name: Jovan Gojković
- Date of birth: 7 January 1975
- Place of birth: Čačak, SFR Yugoslavia
- Date of death: 22 December 2001 (aged 26)
- Place of death: Belgrade, FR Yugoslavia
- Height: 1.78 m (5 ft 10 in)
- Position: Midfielder

Youth career
- Zadrugar Donja Trepča
- BIP Čačak

Senior career*
Years	Team	Apps	(Gls)
1993–1996	Borac Čačak	61	(9)
1996–1997	Čukarički	30	(5)
1997–2000	Red Star Belgrade	75	(21)
2000–2001	Iraklis	29	(3)
Total		195	(38)

International career
1998	FR Yugoslavia	1	(0)
- * Club domestic league appearances and goals

Jovan "Cune" Gojković (Serbian Cyrillic: Јован Гојковић Цуне; 7 January 1975 – 22 December 2001) was a Serbian international footballer.

== Club career ==
Gojković, nicknamed Cune after the well-known singer, made his first steps playing at his local club Zadrugar Donja Trepča. He continued his youth career with BIP Čačak, before moving to city rivals, FK Borac Čačak. In 1996 summer transfer window, he is signed by another top league club, the Belgrade's FK Čukarički. After one season there, his talent was noted by Red Star Belgrade. There he achieved his full affirmation as an excellent player, having been specially known as a very effective player in the big matches like the Eternal derby, against rivals FK Partizan, having been the scorer in many occasions. He stayed there three seasons, until 2000, when he signed with Alpha Ethniki club Iraklis.

== International career ==
He played one match for the FR Yugoslavia national team, on 23 December 1998, against Israel in Tel Aviv.

== Personal life ==
=== Death ===
It was in the period, while playing for Iraklis, that, in its best playing years, Gojković died in a car accident, in the outskirts of Belgrade, while on holiday during the winter break. Since 2009, In his memory, in his hometown Čačak, on the BIP Stadium, a football tournament "Jovan Gojković – Cune" is intended to be held.
