= 1958 Danube Cup =

Tournament details
- Dates: 25 May – 12 July 1958
- Teams: 16

Final positions
- Champions: (Socialist Federal Republic of Yugoslavia) Crvena Zvezda (1st title)
- Runners-up: (Czechoslovakia) Rudá Hvězda Brno

Tournament statistics
- Matches played: 30
- Goals scored: 107 (3.57 per match)

The 1958 edition of Mitropa Cup was unofficial and only for this tournament was named Danube Cup. The tournament was won by the Yugoslavs of Crvena Zvezda.

== Round of 16 ==
May 25 & June 1, 1958

Team 1	Agg.	Team 2	1st leg	2nd leg
Crvena Zvezda (Socialist Federal Republic of Yugoslavia)	2–0	(Czechoslovakia) Dukla Pardubice	2–0	0–0
Rudá Hvězda Brno (Czechoslovakia)	4–2	(Hungary) Salgótarjáni	3–0	1–2
Radnički Beograd (Socialist Federal Republic of Yugoslavia)	5–4	(Hungary) Ferencváros	3–3	2–1
Tatran Prešov (Czechoslovakia)	6–5	(Socialist Federal Republic of Yugoslavia) Partizan	2–4	4–1
Lokomotiv Sofia (Bulgaria)	4–2	(Hungary) Tatabánya	4–1	0–1
Vojvodina (Socialist Federal Republic of Yugoslavia)	5–1	(Bulgaria) Levski Sofia	0–1	5–0
Ştiinţa Timișoara (Romania)	6–5	(Czechoslovakia) Dynamo Prague	3–5	3–0
MTK (Hungary)	9–4	(Romania) CCA București	3–2	6–2

== Quarter-finals ==
June 1 & 15, 1958

Team 1	Agg.	Team 2	1st leg	2nd leg
Crvena Zvezda (Socialist Federal Republic of Yugoslavia)	5–4	(Bulgaria) Lokomotiv Sofia	4–4	1–0
Rudá Hvězda Brno (Czechoslovakia)	0–0	(Socialist Federal Republic of Yugoslavia) Vojvodina	0–0	0–0
Radnički Beograd (Socialist Federal Republic of Yugoslavia)	7–3	(Romania) Ştiinţa Timișoara	4–2	3–1
Tatran Prešov (Czechoslovakia)	4–4	(Hungary) MTK	1–0	3–4

== Semi-finals ==
June 22 & 28, 1958

Team 1	Agg.	Team 2	1st leg	2nd leg
Crvena Zvezda (Socialist Federal Republic of Yugoslavia)	2–1	(Socialist Federal Republic of Yugoslavia) Radnički Beograd	0–0	2–1
Rudá Hvězda Brno (Czechoslovakia)	3–0	(Hungary) MTK	3–0	0–0

== Finals ==
July 6 & 12, 1958

Team 1	Agg.	Team 2	1st leg	2nd leg
Crvena Zvezda (Socialist Federal Republic of Yugoslavia)	7–3	(Czechoslovakia) Rudá Hvězda Brno	4–1	3–2

1958 Danube Cup Champions

Crvena Zvezda
1st Title
