= Bela Palfi =

Serbian footballer

Personal information
- Full name: Bela Palfi
- Date of birth: 16 February 1923
- Place of birth: Bečkerek, Kingdom of Serbs, Croats and Slovenes
- Date of death: 9 September 1995 (aged 72)
- Place of death: Zrenjanin, Serbia, FR Yugoslavia
- Position: Midfielder

Youth career
- 1938–1941: AK Vojvodina Zrenjanin

Senior career*
Years	Team	Apps	(Gls)
1941–1944	Újvideki AC	83	(27)
1945–1946	Spartak Subotica		
1946–1948	Partizan	30	(5)
1948	Spartak Subotica	5	(2)
1948–1953	Red Star Belgrade	73	(5)
1953–1954	Spartak Subotica	24	(7)
1955–1956	Proleter Zrenjanin	24	(9)

International career
1948–1951	Yugoslavia	3	(0)

Managerial career
- 1959–1963: Sloboda Tuzla
- 1963–1966: Aris Thessaloniki
- 1966–1967: Hapoel Petah Tikva
- 1968–1969: Proleter Zrenjanin
- 1969–1975: Kavala
- 1975: Panachaiki
- 1978–1979: Egaleo
- Radnički Kragujevac
- 1981–1983: Priština
- 1984–1985: Proleter Zrenjanin
Medal record
Men's Football
Representing Yugoslavia
Olympic Games
Silver medal – second place	1948 London	Team
- * Club domestic league appearances and goals

Bela Palfi (Serbian Cyrillic: Бела Палфи, Hungarian: Pálfi Béla; 16 February 1923 – 9 September 1995) was a Yugoslav footballer of Hungarian ethnicity who was part of Yugoslavia national football team at the 1950 FIFA World Cup. He later became a manager. With FK Partizan he won national championship (1947) and Yugoslav Cup (1947). With Red Star Belgrade he won 2 national championships (1951, 1953) and three Yugoslav Cups (1948, 1949, 1950).

== Biography ==
He played with Újvideki AC in the Hungarian championship during the Hungarian occupation in the World War II. He was also part of Yugoslavia's squad for the football tournament at the 1948 Summer Olympics, but he did not play in any matches. He earned three caps between 1948 and 1951.

He started his coaching career in Zrenjanin, then he coached FK Sloboda Tuzla in their first seasons in the Yugoslav First League (1959–60 and 1962–63), then he worked in Greece, later took charge of FK Proleter Zrenjanin in the First League in 1969 and also coached Priština. when the club accomplished promotion for the first time to the Yugoslav First League.
