= Miomir Petrović =

Serbian footballer

- Petrović with Partizan

Personal information
- Full name: Miomir Petrović
- Date of birth: 1 December 1922
- Place of birth: Jabukovac, Kingdom of Serbs, Croats and Slovenes
- Date of death: 22 November 2002 (aged 79)
- Place of death: Vršac, FR Yugoslavia
- Position: Defender

Senior career*
Years	Team	Apps	(Gls)
1939–1944	SK Jugoslavija		
1945–1948	Red Star Belgrade	42	(0)
1948–1950	Partizan	27	(0)
1951	Radnički Beograd	19	(0)
1952–1957	Budućnost Titograd		

International career
1946–1949	Yugoslavia	3	(0)
- * Club domestic league appearances and goals

Miomir Petrović (Serbian Cyrillic: Миомир Петровић; 1 December 1922 – 22 November 2002) was a Yugoslav footballer.

He was capped three times by Yugoslavia, between 1946 and 1949.

== Honours ==
Partizan

- Yugoslav First League: 1948–49
