= Predrag Đajić =

Bosnian footballer

Personal information
- Full name: Predrag Đajić
- Date of birth: 1 May 1922
- Place of birth: Sarajevo, Kingdom of Serbs, Croats and Slovenes
- Date of death: 13 May 1979 (aged 57)
- Place of death: Warsaw, Poland
- Position: Midfielder

Youth career
- Slavija Sarajevo

Senior career*
Years	Team	Apps	(Gls)
1937–1940	Slavija Sarajevo	23	(5)
1940–1941	SK Jugoslavija		
1945	Bosnia and Herzegovina	1	(0)
1945–1955	Red Star Belgrade	151	(17)

International career
1949–1953	Yugoslavia	17	(0)
- * Club domestic league appearances and goals

Predrag Đajić (Serbian Cyrillic: Предраг Ђајић; 1 May 1922 – 13 May 1979) was a Yugoslav footballer.

== Club career ==
He had started his playing career before World War II, and had played in Slavija Sarajevo in the 1930s before coming to SK Jugoslavija in 1940.

After the war, he was one of the founders of Red Star Belgrade in 1945, and played for the club until his retirement in 1955. He played 439 games (143 in the Yugoslav First League) and scored 59 goals for the club. He was state champion with Red Star in 1951 and 1953 and he won the national cup in 1948, 1949 and 1950.

== International career ==
He made his debut in the Yugoslavia national team in October 1949 against France and was a member of the squad until 1953. He played three games on the World Cup 1950. He has earned a total of 17 caps, scoring no goals. His final international was a January 1953 friendly match against Egypt.

== Personal life ==
Parallel to his football career Đajić earned an economics diploma and later worked in foreign trade. He was stationed in Warsaw when he suffered a heart attack in May 1979 at the age of 57.
