= ASD Ponziana =

Italian football club

Ponziana
- Full name: Associazione Sportiva Dilettantistica Ponziana
- Founded: 1912; 114 years ago
- Ground: Stadio Giorgio Ferrini, Trieste, Italy
- Capacity: 1,700
- Chairman: (Italy) Alessandro Davanzo
- Manager: (Italy)
- League: Promozione Friuli-Venezia Giulia
Home colours	Away colours

Associazione Sportiva Dilettantistica Ponziana (formerly Circolo Sportivo Ponziana 1912) is an Italian association football club based in the city of Trieste, founded in 1912.

Currently playing in the Promozione Friuli-Venezia Giulia, the 7th level of the Italian football league, Ponziana however did spend some time in the Yugoslav First League following World War II, due to the city of Trieste's unique political situation at this time. Trieste's other club, Triestina, remained in the Italian League during this period.

Ponziana also competed in the Campionato Alta Italia 1944.

Past players include Giovanni Galeone, Erminio Asin and Guglielmo Cudicini, whose son Fabio and grandson Carlo both also went on to be professional players.

Past managers include Pietro Pasinati.
