= Božidar Drenovac =

Serbian footballer and manager (1922–2003)

Personal information
- Date of birth: 2 January 1922
- Place of birth: Ćuprija, Kingdom of Serbs, Croats and Slovenes
- Date of death: 24 July 2003 (aged 81)
- Position: Defender

Youth career
- 1936–1938: Jugoslavija

Senior career*
| Years | Team | Apps | (Gls) |
| 1939–1940 | SK Jugoslavija | 5 | (1) |
| 1946–1948 | Red Star Belgrade | 35 | (3) |
| 1948–1953 | Partizan | 22 | (1) |

International career
| 1947 | Yugoslavia | 1 | (0) |

Managerial career
- 1960–1965: Étoile du Sahel
- 1965–1966: Panachaiki
- 1966–1968: Čelik Zenica
- 1968–1969: Pierikos
- 1969–1970: Étoile du Sahel
- 1970–1971: OFK Beograd
- 1971–1972: Borac Banja Luka
- 1972–1973: Sutjeska Nikšić
- 1973–1974: Panserraikos
- * Club domestic league appearances and goals

Božidar Drenovac (Serbian Cyrillic: Божидар Дреновац; 2 January 1922 – 24 July 2003) was a Serbian football player and manager.

== Club career ==
Drenovac was born in Ćuprija in 1922. Still young he joined Belgrade club SK Jugoslavija in 1936, making his senior debut in the 1939–40 Yugoslav Football Championship. After World War II, he signed with the newly formed Red Star Belgrade that inherited most of the property and players of the now disbanded, SK Jugoslavija. He played with Red Star until 1948. Next he move to the biggest rivals, FK Partizan where he would play until 1953, achieving even more success by winning the national championship (1949) and Yugoslav Cup (1952).

== International career ==
Drenovac played one match for the Yugoslavia national team on 14 September 1947 in Tirana, against Albania, for the Balkan Cup, a 4–2 win.

== Managerial career ==
After retiring, Drenovac graduated in Economics, but never abandoned his passion for football, becoming a coach. His coaching career took him to countries like Tunisia, Greece, Kuwait, United Arab Emirates, Libya, but he also managed a number of Yugoslav top league clubs, such as NK Čelik Zenica, OFK Beograd, FK Borac Banja Luka or FK Sutjeska Nikšić.
