= Vladimir Firm =

Croatian footballer (1923–1996)

Personal information
- Full name: Vladimir Firm
- Date of birth: 5 June 1923
- Place of birth: Zagreb, Kingdom of SCS
- Date of death: 27 November 1996 (aged 73)
- Place of death: Zagreb, Croatia
- Position: Forward

Youth career
- Trnje Zagreb

Senior career*
Years	Team	Apps	(Gls)
1941–1943	Željezničar Zagreb		
1946–1949	Partizan	28	(3)
1950–1955	Lokomotiva Zagreb	104	(50)
1956–1957	NK Zagreb		
1957–1959	FSV Frankfurt		
1959–1962	Solothurn		

International career
1947–1949	Yugoslavia	3	(0)
Medal record
Men's Football
Representing Yugoslavia
Olympic Games
Silver medal – second place	1952 Helsinki	Team
- * Club domestic league appearances and goals

Vladimir Firm (5 June 1923 – 27 November 1996) was a Croatian football player. He was part of Yugoslavia's squad at the 1952 Summer Olympics, but he did not play in any matches.

== International career ==
Firm made his debut for Yugoslavia in a June 1947 friendly match away against Romania and earned a total of 3 caps scoring no goals. His final international was a December 1949 World Cup qualification match away against France.
