= Jovan Jezerkić =

Yugoslav footballer (1920–2000)

Personal information
- Date of birth: September 6, 1920
- Place of birth: Beška, Kingdom of SCS
- Date of death: July 2000 (aged 79)
- Place of death: Belgrade, FR Yugoslavia
- Position: Forward

Youth career
- 1932–1936: Vitez Zemun

Senior career*
Years	Team	Apps	(Gls)
1936–1945	Vitez Zemun		
1945–1947	Red Star Belgrade	20	(13)
1947–1948	Partizan	5	(4)
1948–1952	Red Star Belgrade	45	(16)
1952–1956	Radnički Beograd	45	(21)

International career
1947	Yugoslavia	4	(5)
- * Club domestic league appearances and goals

Jovan Jezerkić (Serbian Cyrillic: Јован Језеркић; 6 September 1920 – July 2000) was a Yugoslav footballer who played as a striker. He was one of the first players to have played for both Belgrade rival clubs Red Star and Partizan.

== Career ==
=== Club career ===
Born in Beška, Kingdom of Serbs, Croats and Slovenes, he begin playing in the youth team of SK Vitez Zemun. In 1936 he became senior and played for the team until 1945. That year he became a member of the newly formed Red Star Belgrade as part of the first squad ever of the club. With the exception of the first half season of 1947–48 that he played with FK Partizan (coincidentally a club that became their major rivals), he played with Red Star all the way until 1952, playing for them a total of 192 matches, 70 in the league, having scored 115 goals, 29 in league. In 1952 he moved to FK Radnički Beograd where, after playing the first season in the Second League, he helped them earn promotion to the Yugoslav First League. He played with them until 1956, scoring another 21 goals in the top league. He was a striker and a typical goal player.

=== International career ===
Jezerkić played four matches for the Yugoslavia national team and scored five goals. He was part of the Yugoslav team at the 1947 Balkan Cup where he made his national team debut.

== Honours ==
Partizan

- Yugoslav Cup: 1947

Red Star

- Yugoslav First League: 1951
- Yugoslav Cup: 1948, 1949, 1950
