= Srđan Mrkušić =

Serbian footballer (1915–2007)

Personal information
- Full name: Srđan Mrkušić
- Date of birth: May 26, 1915
- Place of birth: Podgora, Austria-Hungary
- Date of death: October 30, 2007 (aged 92)
- Place of death: Belgrade, Serbia
- Position: Goalkeeper

Youth career
- AŠK Split
- Hajduk Split

Senior career*
Years	Team	Apps	(Gls)
1936–1937	Hajduk Split	5	(0)
1937–1940	BSK	25	(0)
1945	Milicionar		
1946–1954	Red Star Belgrade	49	(0)

International career
1941–1950	Yugoslavia	11	(0)
- * Club domestic league appearances and goals

Srđan Mrkušić (May 26, 1915 – October 30, 2007) was a Yugoslav footballer who played as a goalkeeper, legendary "third back" and forestry engineer.

With a long professional football career that spanned more than two decades, he is known for representing Yugoslavia at the 1950 World Cup as well as for being one of only seven footballers who represented both the pre and post World War II national team.

He also went down in history as one of the founders of Red Star Belgrade football club in early March 1945 and the first goalkeeper of the Serbian nation team.

Simultaneous to his football career, Mrkušić managed to earn a university degree in forestry. Following the end of his football playing days, he began working as an engineer.

== Early life ==
Born during World War I in the Podgora village near Makarska where his Kotor-born lawyer father got assigned to practice law, Mrkušić's family soon moved to Šibenik and eventually in 1930 to Split where he commenced his secondary education at a local gymnasium. Simultaneously, teenage Mrkušić started playing football despite vehement protestations from his parents, especially mother, who felt that football isn't socially suitable and proper activity for their son.

== Club career ==
Mrkušić began playing organized football with AŠK Split. In 1934, the 18-year-old got spotted by Luka Kaliterna who persuaded the youngster to join Hajduk Split's youth ranks.

In 1935, Mrkušić made his first team debut for Hajduk. Only a year later, after graduating high school, having played a total of 35 matches for Hajduk, Mrkušić moved to Belgrade where he started playing for powerhouse BSK, a team for which he ended up appearing in more than 350 competitive matches over the next decade.

His career would soon be put on hold due to World War II. He formally stayed on BSK's roster despite the fact the team didn't compete in any league. Mrkušić saw virtually no football action over the next four years.

Mrkušić played in the first post-WW2 league championship in the new communist Yugoslavia. He represented the People's Republic of Serbia team that ended up winning the national title that year.

In those years, simultaneous to re-establishing the nationwide league championship, new Yugoslav communist authorities were also busy dissolving existing pre-war football clubs and founding new ones. In reality this mostly meant that players and infrastructure from old clubs were reassigned and reassembled under a new name and new leadership. Mrkušić got assigned to such a club that was in the process of being formed by the state security. The club would eventually be named Red Star, and Mrkušić ended up becoming one of its founders.

Over the next decade, he grew into a dependable keeper, helping Red Star to three Yugoslav Cup titles.

On 9 September 1953 Mrkušić played in what would turn out to be the last competitive match of his career as his Red Star faced Spartak Subotica. At 38 years, three months and thirteen days of age, he became the oldest player to appear in a Yugoslav First League match.

== International career ==
On 23 March 1941, some two weeks before the Nazi German invasion of Yugoslavia, 25-year-old Mrkušić made his debut for Kingdom of Yugoslavia national team in a match versus Hungary.

Following the end of World War II, he appeared 10 more times in the Federal People's Republic of Yugoslavia national team jersey (three of those caps came at the 1950 World Cup in Brazil). He contributed greatly to Yugoslavia's 1950 FIFA World Cup qualifying campaign, putting in a particularly glowing performance on 11 December 1949 in Florence versus France in the deciding qualifying playoff game that Yugoslavia won 3-2 after extra-time.

At the World Cup in Brazil, 35-year-old Mrkušić played all three of Yugoslavia's group stage matches — wins against Switzerland and Mexico followed by a loss to Brazil in the deciding match. Yugoslavia finished second in the group, failing to progress to the next stage.

Mrkušić's very last national team appearance took place on 8 October 1950 in a friendly versus Austria. Already 35 years old at this point, he stepped aside, making way for up-and-coming 22-year-old Vladimir Beara.

== Post-football ==
After retirement from football, Mrkušić continued living in Belgrade.

Since he graduated from University of Belgrade in 1946 with a forestry degree, he decided to seek employment in that field after his football career ended in 1955. He worked in his second profession for decades afterwards, during which among other things he was involved in construction and long-term maintenance of football pitches.

He was also actively involved with Red Star Belgrade veterans' organization.

Mrkušić died in Belgrade, after a short illness, on October 30, 2007.
