= Kosta Tomašević =

Serbian footballer

Personal information
- Date of birth: 25 July 1923
- Place of birth: Stari Banovci, Kingdom of Serbs, Croats and Slovenes
- Date of death: March 13, 1976 (aged 52)
- Place of death: Belgrade, SFR Yugoslavia
- Position: Striker

Senior career*
Years	Team	Apps	(Gls)
- BSK Beograd
1946–1954	Red Star Belgrade	110	(76)
1954–1956	Spartak Subotica	46	(28)

International career
1946–1951	Yugoslavia	10	(5)

Managerial career
- 1960-1961: Sloga Kraljevo
- 1962: Sloga Kraljevo
Medal record
Men's Football
Representing Yugoslavia
Olympic Games
Silver medal – second place	1948 London	Team
- * Club domestic league appearances and goals

Kosta Tomašević (Serbian Cyrillic: Коста Томашевић; 25 July 1923 – 13 March 1976) was a Serbian footballer remembered for his illustrious career with Red Star Belgrade. Tomašević also represented both the Yugoslavia national football team, including playing at the 1948 Summer Olympics.

== Club career ==
Tomašević played for BSK Belgrade before and during the early part of his career. After the Second World War, he became one of the first players of Red Star Belgrade. In the club’s first-ever match, played on the day of its foundation in March 1945, he scored Red Star’s opening goal.

At Red Star, Tomašević became one of the most important players in the club’s early history. With the club he won the 1951 and 1952–53 Yugoslav championship, as well as the Yugoslav Cup in 1948, 1949 and 1950. In the 1951 season, he finished as the Yugoslav league’s top scorer with 16 goals and played a major role in Red Star’s first league title.

After his time in Belgrade, Tomašević moved to Spartak Subotica in 1954, where he played until 1956 and ended his active career. He is credited with a total of 105 goals in the Yugoslav championship, making him one of the league’s most efficient goalscorers.

== International career ==
On the national level, Tomašević made his debut for Yugoslavia in a May 1946 friendly match away against Czechoslovakia and earned a total of 10 caps, scoring 5 goals. He also was a participant at the 1950 FIFA World Cup and his final international was a February 1951 friendly away against France.
