= Dinamo Zagreb records and statistics =

This page is containing records and statistics of Croatian football club GNK Dinamo Zagreb. It shows club records as well as individual records achieved by the club's players.

== Domestic and international titles ==
Number in parentheses indicates number of titles, while competition in bold indicates record number of titles.

Croatian First Football League (26): 1993, 1996, 1997, 1998, 1999, 2000, 2003, 2006, 2007, 2008, 2009, 2010, 2011, 2012, 2013, 2014, 2015, 2016, 2018, 2019, 2020, 2021, 2022, 2023, 2024, 2026
Croatian Football Cup (18): 1994, 1996, 1997, 1998, 2001, 2002, 2004, 2007, 2008, 2009, 2011, 2012, 2015, 2016, 2018, 2021, 2024, 2026
Croatian Football Super Cup (8): 2002, 2003, 2006, 2010, 2013, 2019, 2022, 2023

Yugoslav First League (10): 1923, 1926, 1928, 1937, 1940, 1943, 1948, 1954, 1958, 1982
Yugoslav Cup (7): 1951, 1960, 1963, 1965, 1969, 1980, 1983

Inter-Cities Fairs Cup (1): 1967

== Results and sequences ==
Record of biggest wins and loses in domestic league, domestic cup and official European matches (from 1992).

- Biggest league win: **10–1** vs NK Pazinka, 12 December 1993
- Biggest cup win: **13–0** vs NK Rudeš, 7 October 1992, round of 32
- Biggest European win: **6–0** vs (Faroe Islands) B68 Toftir, 1 September 1993, (UEFA Champions League) preliminary round; **6–0** vs (Hungary) Zalaegerszegi TE, 19 September 2002, (UEFA Cup) 1st round
- Biggest league defeat: **0–4** vs NK Varteks, 26 May 1992; **0–4** vs NK Varteks, 19 November 2000; **0–4** vs Rijeka, 22 February 2025
- Biggest cup defeat: **1–4** vs Hajduk Split, 19 May 1993, final
- Biggest European defeat: **2–9** vs (Germany) Bayern Munich, 17 September 2024, (UEFA Champions League) group stage

Record of longest league sequences in terms of winning, losing, scoring and conceding (from 1992).

- Most games won in a row: **28** - from 8 November 2006 to 15 September 2007
- Most games without defeat: **50** - from 17 May 2014 to 16 October 2015
- Most games without winning: **6** - from 10 October 2001 to 4 November 2001
- Most games lost in a row: **3** - from 4 October 2001 to 21 October 2001
- Most games scored in a row: **61** - from 22 April 2006 to 15 March 2008
- Most games without conceding: **10** - from 2 March 2013 to 11 May 2013
- Most games without scoring: **4** - from 9 April 2005 to 30 April 2005
- Most games conceded in a row: **13** - from 12 March 1995 to 4 June 1995

== Appearances and goals ==
GNK Dinamo Zagreb record players in terms of appearances and goals in official matches (domestic league and cup games, all official European games). Last game updated: Rijeka - Dinamo 2–7 (13 November 2022)

=== Goals ===
No.	Player	Goals
1	(Croatia) Franjo Wölfl	260
2	(Croatia) August Lešnik	196
3	(Croatia) Igor Cvitanović	165
4	(Croatia) Slaven Zambata	158
5	(Croatia) Zvonimir Cimermančić	128
5	(Croatia) Dražan Jerković	128
7	(Croatia) Zlatko Kranjčar	125
8	(Croatia) Snješko Cerin	117
9	(Croatia) Željko Čajkovski	101
10	(Croatia) Eduardo da Silva	92

=== Minutes without conceding in league ===
No.	Goalkeeper	Minutes
1	(Croatia) Ivan Kelava	951
2	(Portugal) Eduardo	627
3	(Croatia) Ivan Turina	625
4	(Croatia) Tomislav Butina	449
5	(Croatia) Dražen Ladić	440
6	(Croatia) Filip Lončarić	401
7	**(Croatia) Dominik Livaković**	398
8	(Croatia) Antonijo Ježina	328
9	(Croatia) Oliver Zelenika	308
10	(Bosnia and Herzegovina) Miralem Ibrahimović	271

Updated on 21 August 2022

== Transfers ==
Highest transfer spending
No.	Player	Signed from	Date	Value
1	(Croatia) Marko Rog	(Croatia) RNK Split	9 July 2015	€ 5.000.000
2	(Croatia) Luka Ivanušec	(Croatia) Lokomotiva	19 August 2019	€ 3.000.000
2	(Croatia) Boško Šutalo	(Italy) Atalanta	21 June 2022	€ 3.000.000
2	(Croatia) Luka Stojković	(Croatia) Lokomotiva	22 August 2023	€ 3.000.000
5	(Croatia) Petar Bočkaj	(Croatia) Osijek	25 December 2021	€ 2.700.000
6	(Nigeria) Iyayi Atiemwen	(Croatia) Gorica	22 January 2019	€ 2.650.000
7	(Chile) Junior Fernendes	(Germany) Bayer Leverkusen	23 April 2014	€ 2.500.000
7	(Croatia) Lovro Majer	(Croatia) Lokomotiva	27 June 2018	€ 2.500.000
7	(Croatia) Robert Prosinečki	(Spain) Sevilla	8 July 1997	€ 2.500.000
10	(Croatia) Marcelo Brozović	(Croatia) Lokomotiva	24 January 2015	€ 2.400.000
11	(Argentina) Adrián Calello	(Argentina) Independiente	15 December 2008	€ 2.200.000
12	(Croatia) Marko Bulat	(Croatia) Šibenik	11 February 2021	€ 2.200.000

Highest transfer earning
No.	Player	Sold to	Date	Value
1	(Croatia) Marko Pjaca	(Italy) Juventus	21 July 2016	€ 23.000.000
2	(Croatia) Luka Modrić	(England) Tottenham Hotspur	26 April 2008	€ 21.000.000
3	(Croatia) Josip Šutalo	(Netherlands) Ajax	21 August 2023	€ 20.500.000
4	(Spain) Dani Olmo	(Germany) RB Leipzig	25 January 2020	€ 19.000.000
5	(Croatia) Joško Gvardiol	(Germany) RB Leipzig	28 September 2020	€ 16.000.000
6	(Croatia) Filip Benković	(England) Leicester City	9 August 2018	€ 14.500.000
7	(Croatia) Eduardo da Silva	(England) Arsenal	3 July 2007	€ 13.500.000
8	(Croatia) Marko Rog	(Italy) Napoli	29 August 2016	€ 13.000.000
8	(Croatia) Vedran Ćorluka	(England) Manchester City	1 September 2007	€ 13.000.000
9	(Croatia) Lovro Majer	(France) Rennes	26 August 2021	€ 12.000.000
10	(Croatia) Dario Šimić	(Italy) Inter Milan	3 January 1999	€ 11.000.000
10	(Croatia) Mateo Kovačić	(Italy) Inter Milan	31 January 2013	€ 11.000.000

Highest transfer earning with bonuses
No.	Player	Sold to	Date	Value
1	(Croatia) Joško Gvardiol	(Germany) RB Leipzig	28 September 2020	€ 37.000.000
2	(Croatia) Marko Pjaca	(Italy) Juventus	21 July 2016	€ 29.000.000
2	(Spain) Dani Olmo	(Germany) RB Leipzig	25 January 2020	€ 29.000.000
4	(Croatia) Luka Modrić	(England) Tottenham Hotspur	26 April 2008	€ 22.500.000
5	(Croatia) Josip Šutalo	(Netherlands) Ajax	21 August 2023	€ 20.500.000
6	(Croatia) Filip Benković	(England) Leicester City	9 August 2018	€ 14.500.000
7	(Croatia) Eduardo da Silva	(England) Arsenal	3 July 2007	€ 13.500.000
8	(Croatia) Marko Rog	(Italy) Napoli	29 August 2016	€ 13.000.000
8	(Croatia) Vedran Ćorluka	(England) Manchester City	1 September 2007	€ 13.000.000
9	(Croatia) Lovro Majer	(France) Rennes	26 August 2021	€ 12.000.000
10	(Croatia) Dario Šimić	(Italy) Inter Milan	3 January 1999	€ 11.000.000
10	(Croatia) Mateo Kovačić	(Italy) Inter Milan	31 January 2013	€ 11.000.000

== Dinamo Zagreb players in major international tournaments ==
Lists below show Dinamo Zagreb players who represented their countries in major senior continental and world competitions. All players were on the squad list of their national team and under contract as Dinamo Zagreb players at the time. Flag in front of the name indicates national team that the player has represented. Gold, silver and bronze icon after the players name indicates medal won with the nation in question.

**1950 FIFA World Cup**

- (Socialist Federal Republic of Yugoslavia) Željko Čajkovski
- (Socialist Federal Republic of Yugoslavia) Ivica Horvat

**1954 FIFA World Cup**

- (Socialist Federal Republic of Yugoslavia) Tomislav Crnković
- (Socialist Federal Republic of Yugoslavia) Dionizije Dvornić
- (Socialist Federal Republic of Yugoslavia) Ivica Horvat
- (Socialist Federal Republic of Yugoslavia) Branko Kralj
- (Socialist Federal Republic of Yugoslavia) Lav Mantula

**1958 FIFA World Cup**

- (Socialist Federal Republic of Yugoslavia) Tomislav Crnković
- (Socialist Federal Republic of Yugoslavia) Gordan Irović
- (Socialist Federal Republic of Yugoslavia) Dražan Jerković
- (Socialist Federal Republic of Yugoslavia) Luka Lipošinović
- (Socialist Federal Republic of Yugoslavia) Ivan Šantek

**1962 FIFA World Cup**

- (Socialist Federal Republic of Yugoslavia) Dražan Jerković
- (Socialist Federal Republic of Yugoslavia) Vlatko Marković
- (Socialist Federal Republic of Yugoslavia) Željko Matuš
- (Socialist Federal Republic of Yugoslavia) Mirko Stojanović

**1982 FIFA World Cup**

- (Socialist Federal Republic of Yugoslavia) Stjepan Deverić
- (Socialist Federal Republic of Yugoslavia) Velimir Zajec

**1990 FIFA World Cup**

- (Socialist Federal Republic of Yugoslavia) Andrej Panadić
- (Socialist Federal Republic of Yugoslavia) Davor Šuker

**1998 FIFA World Cup**

- (Croatia) Krunoslav Jurčić (bronze)
- (Croatia) Goran Jurić (bronze)
- (Croatia) Dražen Ladić (bronze)
- (Croatia) Silvio Marić (bronze)
- (Croatia) Robert Prosinečki (bronze)
- (Croatia) Dario Šimić (bronze)

**2002 FIFA World Cup**

- (Croatia) Tomislav Butina

**2006 FIFA World Cup**

- (Croatia) Ivan Bošnjak
- (Croatia) Luka Modrić

**2014 FIFA World Cup**

- (Algeria) El Arbi Hillel Soudani
- (Croatia) Marcelo Brozović

**2018 FIFA World Cup**

- (Croatia) Dominik Livaković (silver)
- (Switzerland) Mario Gavranović

**2022 FIFA World Cup**

- (Croatia) Dominik Livaković (bronze)
- (Croatia) Mislav Oršić (bronze)
- (Croatia) Bruno Petković (bronze)
- (Croatia) Josip Šutalo (bronze)
- (Iran) Sadegh Moharrami

**2026 FIFA World Cup**

- (Croatia) Dominik Livaković
- (Scotland) Scott McKenna

**1948 Olympics**

- (Socialist Federal Republic of Yugoslavia) Zvonimir Cimermančić (silver)
- (Socialist Federal Republic of Yugoslavia) Željko Čajkovski (silver)
- (Socialist Federal Republic of Yugoslavia) Ivan Jazbinšek (silver)
- (Socialist Federal Republic of Yugoslavia) Ratko Kacijan (silver)
- (Socialist Federal Republic of Yugoslavia) Franjo Wölfl (silver)

**1952 Olympics**

- (Socialist Federal Republic of Yugoslavia) Tomislav Crnković (silver)
- (Socialist Federal Republic of Yugoslavia) Ivica Horvat (silver)

**1956 Olympics**

- (Socialist Federal Republic of Yugoslavia) Mladen Koščak (silver)
- (Socialist Federal Republic of Yugoslavia) Luka Lipošinović (silver)

**1960 Olympics**

- (Socialist Federal Republic of Yugoslavia) Željko Matuš (gold)
- (Socialist Federal Republic of Yugoslavia) Željko Perušić (gold)

**1964 Olympics**

- (Socialist Federal Republic of Yugoslavia) Rudolf Belin
- (Socialist Federal Republic of Yugoslavia) Zlatko Škorić
- (Socialist Federal Republic of Yugoslavia) Slaven Zambata

**1980 Olympics**

- (Socialist Federal Republic of Yugoslavia) Tomislav Ivković

**1984 Olympics**

- (Socialist Federal Republic of Yugoslavia) Borislav Cvetković (bronze)
- (Socialist Federal Republic of Yugoslavia) Stjepan Deverić (bronze)

**1996 Olympics**

- (Australia) Mark Viduka

**1997 FIFA Confederations Cup**

- (Australia) Mark Viduka (silver)

**UEFA Euro 1960**

- (Socialist Federal Republic of Yugoslavia) Tomislav Crnković (silver)
- (Socialist Federal Republic of Yugoslavia) Dražan Jerković (silver)
- (Socialist Federal Republic of Yugoslavia) Željko Matuš (silver)
- (Socialist Federal Republic of Yugoslavia) Željko Perušić (silver)

**UEFA Euro 1968**

- (Socialist Federal Republic of Yugoslavia) Rudolf Belin (silver)
- (Socialist Federal Republic of Yugoslavia) Mladen Ramljak (silver)

**UEFA Euro 1984**

- (Socialist Federal Republic of Yugoslavia) Borislav Cvetković
- (Socialist Federal Republic of Yugoslavia) Stjepan Deverić
- (Socialist Federal Republic of Yugoslavia) Velimir Zajec

**UEFA Euro 1996**

- (Croatia) Igor Cvitanović
- (Croatia) Dražen Ladić
- (Croatia) Zvonimir Soldo
- (Croatia) Dario Šimić

**UEFA Euro 2000**

- (Slovenia) Zoran Pavlovič

**UEFA Euro 2008**

- (Croatia) Luka Modrić
- (Croatia) Ognjen Vukojević

**UEFA Euro 2012**

- (Croatia) Milan Badelj
- (Croatia) Ivan Kelava
- (Croatia) Josip Šimunić
- (Croatia) Domagoj Vida
- (Croatia) Šime Vrsaljko

**UEFA Euro 2016**

- (Croatia) Ante Ćorić
- (Croatia) Marko Pjaca
- (Croatia) Marko Rog
- (Croatia) Gordon Schildenfeld
- (Portugal) Eduardo (gold)
- (Romania) Alexandru Mățel

**UEFA Euro 2020**

- (Croatia) Joško Gvardiol
- (Croatia) Luka Ivanušec
- (Croatia) Dominik Livaković
- (Croatia) Mislav Oršić
- (Croatia) Bruno Petković
- (North Macedonia) Arijan Ademi
- (North Macedonia) Stefan Ristovski
- (Switzerland) Mario Gavranović

**UEFA Euro 2024**

- (Albania) Arbër Hoxha
- (Croatia) Martin Baturina
- (Croatia) Bruno Petković

**2023 UEFA Nations League Finals**

- (Croatia) Luka Ivanušec (silver)
- (Croatia) Dominik Livaković (silver)
- (Croatia) Bruno Petković (silver)
- (Croatia) Josip Šutalo (silver)

**2015 Africa Cup of Nations**

- (Algeria) El Arbi Hillel Soudani

**2017 Africa Cup of Nations**

- (Algeria) El Arbi Hillel Soudani

**2025 Africa Cup of Nations**

- (Algeria) Monsef Bakrar
- (Algeria) Ismaël Bennacer

**2015 Copa América**

- (Chile) Ángelo Henríquez (gold)

== See also ==
- List of GNK Dinamo Zagreb seasons
- GNK Dinamo Zagreb Academy
- GNK Dinamo Zagreb in European football
