= 1957–58 NK Dinamo Zagreb season =

Dinamo Zagreb
1957–58 season
- Manager: Gustav Lechner
- Stadium: Stadion Maksimir
- 1. Federal League: Champions (3rd title)
- Marshal Tito Cup: Quarter-final
- Top goalscorer: League: Dražan Jerković (19); All: Dražan Jerković (20)
- Highest home attendance: 30,475 (vs Red Star)
- Lowest home attendance: 4,624 (vs NK Zagreb)
- Average home league attendance: 13,738

The 1957–58 season was Dinamo Zagreb's twelfth season in the Yugoslav First League. They finished 1st in the league, winning their third league title, with four points ahead of runners-up Partizan.

== First Federal League ==
=== Results summary ===
| Overall | | | | | | | | Home | | | | | | Away | | | | | |
| Pld | W | D | L | GF | GA | GD | Pts | W | D | L | GF | GA | GD | W | D | L | GF | GA | GD |
|---|---|---|---|---|---|---|---|---|---|---|---|---|---|---|---|---|---|---|---|
| 26 | 15 | 7 | 4 | 53 | 33 | +20 | 37 | 10 | 3 | 0 | 34 | 10 | +24 | 5 | 4 | 4 | 19 | 23 | –4 |

=== Matches ===
| M | Date | Opponents | Venue | Result | Score F–A | Dinamo scorers | Attendance | Ref |
|---|---|---|---|---|---|---|---|---|
| 1 | 11 August 1957 | Red Star | A | W | 2–1 | Jerković 65', Čonč 90' | 20,000 | |
| 2 | 18 August 1957 | Velež | H | W | 4–2 | Jerković 31', 41', 46', 75' (4) | 11,500 | |
| 3 | 25 August 1957 | Hajduk Split | A | L | 1–5 | Prelčec 87' | 20,000 | |
| 4 | 1 September 1957 | BSK* | H | D | 0–0 | | 12,560 | |
| 5 | 8 September 1957 | Budućnost | A | W | 1–0 | Jerković 86' | 8,000 | |
| 6 | 6 October 1957 | RNK Split | A | L | 0–1 | | 6,000 | |
| 7 | 13 October 1957 | Vojvodina | H | W | 4–1 | Režek 5', Jerković 28', 76' (2), Čonč 65' | 13,460 | |
| 8 | 20 October 1957 | Partizan | A | L | 1–4 | Jerković 4' | 25,000 | |
| 9 | 27 October 1957 | Vardar | H | W | 5–1 | Jerković 24', 44', 50' (3), Gašpert 84', Lipošinović 84' (pen.) | 9,368 | |
| 10 | 24 November 1957 | Radnički | A | L | 0–4 | | 8,000 | |
| 11 | 1 December 1957 | Željezničar | H | W | 1–0 | Lipošinović 15' | 4,673 | |
| 12 | 8 December 1957 | NK Zagreb | A | W | 3–1 | Benko 13', 77' (2), Jerković 24' | 6,388 | |
| 13 | 15 December 1957 | Spartak Subotica | H | W | 3–1 | Benko 13' (pen.), Tapiška 35' (o.g.), Lipošinović 58' | 5,564 | |
| 14 | 16 February 1958 | Red Star | H | D | 1–1 | Gašpert 3' | 30,475 | |
| 15 | 23 February 1958 | Velež | A | W | 3–2 | Benko 18', 47' (2), Lipošinović 56' | 7,806 | |
| 16 | 2 March 1958 | Hajduk Split | H | W | 4–0 | Benko 45', 65', 85' (3), Bego 84' (o.g.) | 25,377 | |
| 17 | 9 March 1958 | OFK Beograd* | A | D | 0–0 | | 10,000 | |
| 18 | 16 March 1958 | Budućnost | H | W | 1–0 | Jerković 16' | 12,541 | |
| 19 | 23 March 1958 | RNK Split | H | W | 4–1 | Režek 33', Lipošinović 48', 80' (2), Matuš 63' | 8,003 | |
| 20 | 26 March 1958 | Vojvodina | A | D | 0–0 | | 9,000 | |
| 21 | 30 March 1958 | Partizan | H | W | 1–0 | Jerković 56' | 25,450 | |
| 22 | 6 April 1958 | Vardar | A | W | 3–0 | Jerković 49', 79' (2), Gašpert 61' | 25,000 | |
| 23 | 9 April 1958 | Radnički | H | D | 1–1 | Gašpert 65' | 15,000 | |
| 24 | 13 April 1958 | Željezničar | A | D | 1–1 | Gašpert 22' | 12,000 | |
| 25 | 23 April 1958 | NK Zagreb | H | W | 5–2 | Matuš 27', 44' (2), Čonč 43', Lipošinović 76', 87' (2) | 4,624 | |
| 26 | 27 April 1958 | Spartak Subotica | A | D | 4–4 | Jerković 3', 77' (2), Hmelina 33', Čonč 88' | 10,000 | |

Note: BSK Beograd merged with smaller club TSC Šumadija on 26 November 1957, after match day 10. After the merger, the club was renamed OFK Beograd.

=== Classification ===
| Pos | Team | Pld | W | D | L | GF | GA | GR | Pts | Qualification or relegation |
|---|---|---|---|---|---|---|---|---|---|---|
| 1 | Dinamo Zagreb (C) | 26 | 15 | 7 | 4 | 53 | 33 | 1.606 | 37 | Qualification for European Cup preliminary round |
| 2 | Partizan | 26 | 13 | 7 | 6 | 46 | 33 | 1.394 | 33 | |
| 3 | Radnički Beograd | 26 | 11 | 6 | 9 | 50 | 38 | 1.316 | 28 | |
| 4 | Red Star Belgrade | 26 | 10 | 8 | 8 | 45 | 38 | 1.184 | 28 | |
| 5 | Vojvodina | 26 | 12 | 3 | 11 | 55 | 32 | 1.719 | 27 | |

Source: rsssf.org
Rules for classification: 1st points; 2nd goal average.
(C) Champions

== Marshal Tito Cup ==
=== Matches ===
| Round | Date | Opponents | Venue | Result | Score F–A | Dinamo scorers | Attendance | Ref |
|---|---|---|---|---|---|---|---|---|
| R32 | | Borovo | A | W | 4–1 | | | |
| R16 | 2 February 1958 | OFK Beograd | H | W | 2–0 | | | |
| QF | 9 February 1958 | Red Star | A | L | 1–1 (a.e.t.) 1–2 (p) | Jerković 17' | 20,000 | |

== Players ==
=== Squad statistics ===
Key

Pos = Playing position

Nat. = Nationality

DoB (Age) = Date of birth (age)

Apps = Appearances

GK = Goalkeeper

DF = Defender

MF = Midfielder

FW = Forward

Numbers indicate starting appearances + appearances as substitute. Goals column shows total goals scored, numbers in brackets indicate penalties scored.
Players with name struck through and marked † left the club during the playing season.
Age as of 11 August 1957, first league matchday of the season.

| Pos. | Nat. | Name | DoB (Age) | League | | Cup | | Total | |
| Pos. | Nat. | Name | DoB (Age) | Apps | Goals | Apps | Goals | Apps | Goals |
|---|---|---|---|---|---|---|---|---|---|
| DF | (Socialist Federal Republic of Yugoslavia) | Josip Šikić | 4 August 1929 (aged 28) | 26 | 0 | 3 | 0 | 29 | 0 |
| DF | (Socialist Federal Republic of Yugoslavia) | Tomislav Crnković | 17 June 1929 (aged 28) | 25 | 0 | 3 | 0 | 28 | 0 |
| GK | (Socialist Federal Republic of Yugoslavia) | Gordan Irović | 2 July 1934 (aged 23) | 24 | 0 | 3 | 0 | 27 | 0 |
| MF | (Socialist Federal Republic of Yugoslavia) | Branko Režek | | 24 | 2 | 2 | 0 | 26 | 2 |
| FW | (Socialist Federal Republic of Yugoslavia) | Dražan Jerković | | 22 | 17 | 3 | 3 | 25 | 20 |
| DF | (Socialist Federal Republic of Yugoslavia) | Mladen Košćak | | 22 | 0 | 3 | 0 | 25 | 0 |
| FW | (Socialist Federal Republic of Yugoslavia) | Luka Lipošinović | 12 May 1933 (aged 24) | 20 | 8 | 3 | 0 | 23 | 8 |
| MF | (Socialist Federal Republic of Yugoslavia) | Željko Matuš | | 20 | ? | 3 | ? | 23 | ? |
| MF | (Socialist Federal Republic of Yugoslavia) | Franjo Gašpert | | ? | ? | ? | ? | 23 | 8 |
| MF | (Socialist Federal Republic of Yugoslavia) | Vladimir Čonč | 13 January 1928 (aged 25) | 20 | 4 | 0 | 0 | 20 | 4 |
| DF | (Socialist Federal Republic of Yugoslavia) | Ivica Banožić | | | | | | 19 | 0 |
| FW | (Socialist Federal Republic of Yugoslavia) | Aleksandar Benko | 16 February 1925 (aged 32) | 12 | 8 | 3 | 3 | 15 | 11 |
| DF | (Socialist Federal Republic of Yugoslavia) | Drago Hmelina | | | | | | 8 | 1 |
| DF | (Socialist Federal Republic of Yugoslavia) | Ivan Šantek | | | | | | 8 | 1 |
| MF | (Socialist Federal Republic of Yugoslavia) | Emil Ferković | | 5 | 0 | 0 | 0 | 5 | 0 |
| DF | (Socialist Federal Republic of Yugoslavia) | Zdravko Prelčec | | 4 | 1 | 0 | 0 | 4 | 1 |
| DF | (Socialist Federal Republic of Yugoslavia) | Bernard Hügl??? | 27 March 1908 (aged 49) | | | | | 3 | 0 |
| GK | (Socialist Federal Republic of Yugoslavia) | Vladimir Majerović | | | | | | 2 | 0 |
| | (Socialist Federal Republic of Yugoslavia) | Marijan Kolonić | | 1 | 0 | 1 | 0 | 2 | 0 |
