= List of GNK Dinamo Zagreb seasons =

This is a list of all seasons played by GNK Dinamo Zagreb in national and European football, from the foundation of the club in June 1945 to the most recent completed season. The club spent its entire existence playing top-flight football (from 1946 to 1991 in the Yugoslav First League, from 1991 onwards in the Prva HNL).

This list details the club's achievements in all major competitions, and the top scorers for each season (note that only goals scored in league matches are taken into account). Players in bold were also top league scorers that season.

== Seasons ==
=== 1946–1991 ===
Following the club's formation as the municipal multi-sports club (Fizkulturno društvo) FD Dinamo in June 1945, the club's first competitive success was winning the first post-war Zagreb municipal championship held in January–February 1946, and then finishing as runners-up behind Hajduk Split in the SR Croatia regional championship, which doubled as a qualifying tournament for the 1946–47 First Federal League (Croatian: Prva savezna liga), the inaugural season of the post-war top football division in Yugoslavia.

Dinamo soon established themselves as one of the "Big Four" of Yugoslav football, along with fellow Croatian side Hajduk Split and the Belgrade-based Partizan and Red Star), a quartet of teams who dominated football in SFR Yugoslavia. Dinamo finished as league runners-up in 1946–47, and then won league titles in 1947–48, 1953–54 and 1957–58.

Dinamo were never relegated from top level until leaving the league at the end of the 1990–91 season, following Croatia's independence. During the Yugoslav era Dinamo won in total four league titles and seven Marshal Tito Cups, the premier cup competition of Yugoslavia. They were also only the third Yugoslav side to play in an UEFA-sponsored competition when they appeared in the 1958–59 European Cup, after Partizan in 1955 and Red Star in 1956.

The club's most successful period in that era was during the 1960s, when they reached six Marshal Tito Cup finals (winning four). However, in spite of good results on the pitch, they failed to clinch a single league title, finishing as runners-up five times in that period. The club also had two successful international campaigns during that era, in the defunct Inter-Cities Fairs Cup, reaching two finals, in 1963 (lost to Valencia) and 1967, losing the former to Spanish club Valencia and winning the latter by beating England's Leeds United 2–0 on aggregate. This remained the only European silverware won by any Yugoslav club for more than two decades, until Red Star's win in the 1990–91 European Cup. Dinamo also participated in various other non-UEFA international tournaments and competitions in this era, including the Mitropa Cup and the Balkans Cup, which they won in June 1976.

Dinamo's second "Golden Age" came in the first half of the 1980s, when Dinamo reached another five cup finals, winning two. More importantly, they also won the elusive league championship title in the 1981–82 season under the guidance of eccentric coach Miroslav Blažević. This was the club's first league triumph in 24 years, a success that they didn't manage to replicate until the end of Yugoslav competitions, although they finished second in 1989–90 and 1990–91, the last two seasons before the country's dissolution. Because of this, the 1981–82 season figures prominently in the club's lore.

In the Yugoslav era three Dinamo players were top league scorers on four occasions: Franjo Wölfl in 1947 and 1948, Dražan Jerković in 1962 (who also went on to become joint top scorer at the 1962 FIFA World Cup that year) and Snješko Cerin in 1982. Cerin went on to become the club's most prolific scorer in this period, with a total of 103 league goals for Dinamo between 1976 and 1986.

The most successful managers were Milan Antolković who led the club to three cup finals (1960, 1963 and 1963 - winning the first two) and the Inter-Cities Fairs Cup final in 1963; and Miroslav Blažević who led the club to the 1981–82 league win and three cup finals (1982, 1983 and 1986 - winning only the 1983 edition). Other trophy-winning managers were the Austrian Karl Mütsch (league title in 1947–48), Bernard Hügl (cup win in 1951), Ivan Jazbinšek (league title in 1953–54), Gustav Lechner (league title in 1957–58), Vlatko Konjevod (cup win in 1965), Ivica Horvat (cup win in 1969) and Vlatko Marković (cup win in 1980).

=== Key ===
Divisions

- 1. JSL = First Federal League (1946–1991)
- 1. HNL = Croatian First Football League (1992–present)

League

- P = Games played
- W = Games won
- D = Games drawn
- L = Games lost
- GF = Goals for
- GA = Goals against
- Pts = Points
- Pos = Final position
- N/A = Not applicable

Champions	Runners-up	Promoted	Relegated

Cup/Europe

- PR = Preliminary round
- PO = Play-off round
- QR = Qualifying round
- R1 = Round 1
- R2 = Round 2
- R3 = Round 3
- GS = Group stage
- LP = League phase
- QF = Quarter-finals
- SF = Semi-finals
- RU = Runners-up
- W = Winners

Season	League									Cup	Europe / Other		Top league scorer(s)^{[B]}	
Season	Division	P	W	D^{[A]}	L	GF	GA	Pts	Pos	Cup	Europe / Other		Player(s)	Goals
1946–47	1. JSL	26	19	4	3	81	26	42	2nd	R2			**Franjo Wölfl**	28
1947–48	1. JSL	18	14	1	3	56	20	29	**1st**	SF			**Franjo Wölfl**	22
1948–49	1. JSL	18	7	5	6	29	25	19	4th	R1			Franjo Wölfl	11
1950	1. JSL	18	9	4	5	23	17	22	4th	RU			Franjo Wölfl	10
1951	1. JSL	22	16	3	3	45	19	35	2nd	**W**	Mitropa Cup	3rd	Dionizije Dvornić	11
1952	1. JSL	16	8	3	5	35	27	19	4th^{[C]}	R1			Božidar Senčar	9
1952–53	1. JSL	22	8	6	8	32	30	22	7th	SF			Dionizije Dvornić	9
1953–54	1. JSL	26	19	4	3	72	22	42	**1st**	R2			Dionizije Dvornić	16
1954–55	1. JSL	26	14	6	6	54	49	34	3rd	QF			Aleksandar Benko	16
1955–56	1. JSL	26	12	4	10	42	47	28	4th	N/A^{[D]}			Dražan Jerković	9
1956–57	1. JSL	26	10	6	10	51	51	26	5th	R2			Aleksandar Benko; Dražan Jerković	10
1957–58	1. JSL	26	15	7	4	53	33	37	**1st**	QF			Dražan Jerković	17
1958–59	1. JSL	22	9	4	9	35	28	22	5th	QF	European Cup	R1	Dražan Jerković	7
1959–60	1. JSL	22	14	4	4	48	20	32	2nd	**W**			Dražan Jerković	16
1960–61	1. JSL	22	10	7	5	36	27	27	4th	R2	Cup Winners' Cup	SF	Željko Matuš	11
1961–62	1. JSL	22	10	5	7	36	23	25	3rd	SF	Mitropa Cup	SF	**Dražan Jerković**	16
1961–62	1. JSL	22	10	5	7	36	23	25	3rd	SF	Inter-Cities Fairs Cup	R2	**Dražan Jerković**	16
1962–63	1. JSL	26	14	7	5	52	35	35	2nd	**W**	Inter-Cities Fairs Cup	RU	Slaven Zambata	16
1963–64	1. JSL	26	12	9	5	40	29	33	3rd	RU	Cup Winners' Cup	R1	Slaven Zambata	12
1964–65	1. JSL	28	11	4	13	35	34	26	8th	**W**	Cup Winners' Cup	QF	Rudolf Belin	7
1965–66	1. JSL	30	13	9	8	49	35	35	2nd	RU	Cup Winners' Cup	R1	Slaven Zambata	19
1966–67	1. JSL	30	15	10	5	42	21	40	2nd	R1	Mitropa Cup	QF	Slaven Zambata	13
1966–67	1. JSL	30	15	10	5	42	21	40	2nd	R1	Inter-Cities Fairs Cup	**W**	Slaven Zambata	13
1967–68	1. JSL	30	12	11	7	45	33	35	3rd	R1	Inter-Cities Fairs Cup	R2	Josip Gucmirtl	14
1968–69	1. JSL	34	20	5	9	75	33	45	2nd	**W**	Inter-Cities Fairs Cup	R1	Slaven Zambata	15
1969–70	1. JSL	34	13	12	9	47	42	38	6th	SF	Cup Winners' Cup	QF	Marijan Novak	10
1970–71	1. JSL	34	17	9	8	55	32	43	3rd	SF	Inter-Cities Fairs Cup	R3	Josip Gucmirtl	10
1971–72	1. JSL	34	11	10	13	47	40	32	8th	RU	UEFA Cup	R2	Slavko Kovačić	7
1972–73	1. JSL	34	11	11	12	39	47	33	8th	R1	Mitropa Cup	GS	Fikret Mujkić	8
1973–74	1. JSL	34	12	9	13	34	33	33	7th	QF	Cup Winners' Cup	R1	Mario Bonić; Drago Vabec	8
1974–75	1. JSL	34	11	16	7	38	31	38	5th	N/A^{[D]}			Zlatko Kranjčar	8
1975–76	1. JSL	34	17	10	7	38	23	44	3rd	RU	Balkans Cup	**W**	Drago Vabec	19
1976–77	1. JSL	34	15	11	8	52	36	41	2nd	R1	UEFA Cup	R2	Snješko Cerin	14
1977–78	1. JSL	34	12	13	9	54	49	37	4th	SF	UEFA Cup	R2	Mario Bonić	10
1978–79	1. JSL	34	21	8	5	67	38	50	2nd	R1			Snješko Cerin; Zlatko Kranjčar	13
1979–80	1. JSL	34	9	14	11	43	44	32	12th	**W**	UEFA Cup	R1	Zlatko Kranjčar	14
1980–81	1. JSL	34	12	11	11	44	38	35	5th	R2	Cup Winners' Cup	R1	Abid Kovačević	14
1981–82	1. JSL	34	20	9	5	67	32	49	**1st**	RU			**Snješko Cerin**	19
1982–83	1. JSL	34	14	15	5	56	40	43	3rd	**W**	European Cup	R1	Zlatko Kranjčar	13
1983–84	1. JSL	34	11	9	14	58	51	31	12th	SF	Cup Winners' Cup	R1	Snješko Cerin	16
1984–85	1. JSL	34	14	8	12	47	38	36	6th	RU			Snješko Cerin	10
1985–86	1. JSL	34	11	14	9	53	43	36	6th	RU			Boro Cvetković	12
1986–87	1. JSL	34	14	9	11	49	43	37	6th^{[E]}	R1			Ivan Cvjetković	11
1987–88	1. JSL	34	16	10	8	55	36	42	4th	R1			Haris Škoro	14
1988–89	1. JSL	34	16	9 (2)	9	42	29	34	5th	QF	UEFA Cup	R2	Radmilo Mihajlović	9
1989–90	1. JSL	34	16	11 (8)	7	53	25	40	2nd	R2	UEFA Cup	PR	Davor Šuker	12
1990–91	1. JSL	36	20	10 (6)	6	72	36	46	2nd	QF	UEFA Cup	R1	Davor Šuker	22

=== 1992–present ===
Following the 1990–91 Yugoslav First League Croatian clubs abandoned the league amid the breakup of Yugoslavia and joined the present-day Croatian football league system as the country declared independence. Dinamo Zagreb were thus founding members of the Prva HNL (1. HNL). Affected by the ongoing war in Croatia the league's inaugural season was shortened and held over the course of only one calendar year from February to June 1992. During the season the club took part in European competitions on account of qualification secured at the end of the 1990–91 Yugoslav season as Dinamo had finished runners-up in the league and qualified for the 1991–92 UEFA Cup. Due to the ongoing war Croatian clubs had to host their European games abroad so Dinamo played their UEFA Cup first round fixture against Trabzonspor in Klagenfurt, Austria. The following 1992–93 season no Croatian club was allowed to enter European competitions as the Croatian Football Federation, the league's governing body, was not yet recognized by UEFA and officially became its affiliate as late as June 1993.

Amid political turmoil in the early 1990s club's officials began claiming direct lineage to pre-WWII Zagreb-based clubs Građanski Zagreb and HAŠK and in order to reflect this Dinamo were renamed "HAŠK Građanski" in June 1991. They finished fifth in the inaugural 1. HNL season and reached the Croatian Cup final which they lost to minnows Inker Zaprešić. In February 1993 the club were renamed "Croatia Zagreb". They won five league titles and three domestic cups and participated in the 1998–99 and 1999–2000 UEFA Champions League group stages carrying that name before reverting to "Dinamo Zagreb" in February 2000.

Season	League									Cup	European competitions		Top league scorer(s)^{[B]}	
Season	Division	P	W	D	L	GF	GA	Pts	Pos	Cup	European competitions		Player(s)	Goals
1992	1. HNL	22	11	4	7	32	21	26	5th	RU	UEFA Cup	R1	Goran Vlaović	9
1992–93	1. HNL	30	21	7	2	84	27	49	**1st**	RU			**Goran Vlaović**	23
1993–94	1. HNL	34	20	8	6	98	34	48	3rd	**W**	Champions League	R1	**Goran Vlaović**	29
1994–95	1. HNL	30	19	7	4	53	26	64	2nd	RU	Cup Winners' Cup	R1	Igor Pamić	10
1995–96	1. HNL	32	21	5	6	75	27	68	**1st**	**W**			**Igor Cvitanović**	19
1996–97	1. HNL	30	26	3	1	90	23	81	**1st**	**W**	UEFA Cup	QR	**Igor Cvitanović**	20
1997–98	1. HNL	32	22	7	3	75	28	73	**1st**	**W**	Champions League	QR2	Vladimir Petrović	11
1997–98	1. HNL	32	22	7	3	75	28	73	**1st**	**W**	UEFA Cup	R3	Vladimir Petrović	11
1998–99	1. HNL	32	22	5	5	55	20	71	**1st**	R1	Champions League	GS	Edin Mujčin	10
1999–2000	1. HNL	33	23	6	4	83	25	75	**1st**	RU	Champions League	GS	**Tomo Šokota**	21
2000–01	1. HNL	32	19	8	5	70	36	65	2nd	**W**	Champions League	QR3	**Tomo Šokota**	20
2000–01	1. HNL	32	19	8	5	70	36	65	2nd	**W**	UEFA Cup	R2	**Tomo Šokota**	20
2001–02	1. HNL	30	18	5	7	58	30	59	3rd	**W**	UEFA Cup	R1	Dario Zahora	14
2002–03	1. HNL	32	25	3	4	76	27	78	**1st**	R2	UEFA Cup	R2	**Ivica Olić**	16
2003–04	1. HNL	32	23	7	2	77	25	76	2nd	**W**	Champions League	QR3	Dario Zahora	16
2003–04	1. HNL	32	23	7	2	77	25	76	2nd	**W**	UEFA Cup	R2	Dario Zahora	16
2004–05	1. HNL	32	12	11	9	55	37	47	7th	QF	UEFA Cup	GS	Ivan Bošnjak; Eduardo da Silva	10
2005–06	1. HNL	32	24	4	4	78	21	76	**1st**	R2			**Ivan Bošnjak**	22
2006–07	1. HNL	33	30	2	1	84	22	92	**1st**	**W**	Champions League	QR3	**Eduardo da Silva**	34
2006–07	1. HNL	33	30	2	1	84	22	92	**1st**	**W**	UEFA Cup	R1	**Eduardo da Silva**	34
2007–08	1. HNL	33	26	4	3	91	34	82	**1st**	**W**	Champions League	QR3	Luka Modrić	13
2007–08	1. HNL	33	26	4	3	91	34	82	**1st**	**W**	UEFA Cup	GS	Luka Modrić	13
2008–09	1. HNL	33	23	5	5	71	26	74	**1st**	**W**	Champions League	QR3	**Mario Mandžukić**	16
2008–09	1. HNL	33	23	5	5	71	26	74	**1st**	**W**	UEFA Cup	GS	**Mario Mandžukić**	16
2009–10	1. HNL	30	18	8	4	70	20	62	**1st**	SF	Champions League	QR3	Mario Mandžukić	14
2009–10	1. HNL	30	18	8	4	70	20	62	**1st**	SF	Europa League	GS	Mario Mandžukić	14
2010–11	1. HNL	30	22	6	2	52	12	72	**1st**	**W**	Champions League	QR3	Sammir	10
2010–11	1. HNL	30	22	6	2	52	12	72	**1st**	**W**	Europa League	GS	Sammir	10
2011–12	1. HNL	30	23	6	1	73	11	75	**1st**	**W**	Champions League	GS	**Fatos Bećiraj**	15
2012–13	1. HNL	33	24	5	4	68	20	77	**1st**	R2	Champions League	GS	Sammir	13
2013–14	1. HNL	36	26	6	4	83	26	84	**1st**	RU	Champions League	Playoff	**Duje Čop**	22
2013–14	1. HNL	36	26	6	4	83	26	84	**1st**	RU	Europa League	GS	**Duje Čop**	22
2014–15	1. HNL	36	26	10	0	85	21	88	**1st**	**W**	Champions League	Playoff	Ángelo Henríquez	20
2014–15	1. HNL	36	26	10	0	85	21	88	**1st**	**W**	Europa League	GS	Ángelo Henríquez	20
2015–16	1. HNL	36	26	7	3	67	19	85	**1st**	**W**	Champions League	GS	Armin Hodžić	13
2016–17	1. HNL	36	27	5	4	68	24	86	2nd	RU	Champions League	GS	El Arabi Hillel Soudani	17
2017–18	1. HNL	36	22	7	7	68	34	73	**1st**	**W**	Europa League	Playoff	**El Arabi Hillel Soudani**	17
2018–19	1. HNL	36	29	5	2	74	20	92	**1st**	RU	Champions League	Playoff	Bruno Petković	10
2018–19	1. HNL	36	29	5	2	74	20	92	**1st**	RU	Europa League	R16	Bruno Petković	10
2019–20	1. HNL	36	25	5	6	62	20	80	**1st**	QF	Champions League	GS	Mislav Oršić	13
2020–21	1. HNL	36	26	7	3	84	28	85	**1st**	**W**	Champions League	QR3	Mario Gavranović	17
2020–21	1. HNL	36	26	7	3	84	28	85	**1st**	**W**	Europa League	QF	Mario Gavranović	17
2021–22	1. HNL	36	24	7	5	68	22	79	**1st**	QF	Champions League	Playoff	Mislav Oršić	14
2021–22	1. HNL	36	24	7	5	68	22	79	**1st**	QF	Europa League	KPO	Mislav Oršić	14
2022–23	HNL	36	24	9	3	81	28	81	**1st**	SF	Champions League	GS	Luka Ivanušec	12
2023–24	HNL	36	25	7	4	67	30	82	**1st**	**W**	Champions League	QR3	Bruno Petković	11
2023–24	HNL	36	25	7	4	67	30	82	**1st**	**W**	Europa League	Playoff	Bruno Petković	11
2023–24	HNL	36	25	7	4	67	30	82	**1st**	**W**	Conference League	R16	Bruno Petković	11
2024–25	HNL	36	19	8	9	69	41	65	2nd	QF	Champions League	LP	Sandro Kulenović	15
2025–26	HNL	36	27	5	4	93	28	86	1st	W	Europa League	KPO	**Dion Drena Beljo**	31

== Notes ==
- **^{A}** Between the 1988–89 and 1990–91 seasons the Yugoslav league employed a rule to hold penalty shoot-outs following tied games, with only the winning team winning a point. Figures in brackets in the drawn games column indicate points won through these penalty kicks.
- **^{B}** Includes only goals scored in league matches. Players indicated in **bold** were also top league scorers that season.
- **^{C}** The 1952 Yugoslav First League was shortened and completed over a period of three and a half months, from early March to late June. The reason for the changes was a desire to start the next season in the fall of 1952, to implement the fall–spring format that had become a norm all across Europe by this point. Twelve clubs were divided into two groups of six teams each, who played each other in a double round robin format. After ten rounds Dinamo topped their group and qualified for the four-team championship playoff, which was also played in a double round-robin format. Dinamo finished fourth, six points behind winners Hajduk Split. The statistics for the 1952 season show season totals over both stages.
- **^{D}** In the 1955–56 and 1974–75 seasons the Marshal Tito Cup was not played. On both occasions the reason was rescheduling, as the FSJ decided to move the date when cup finals are held from late November (to coincide with Republic Day, the anniversary of the establishment of communist Yugoslavia celebrated on 29 November) to late May (to coincide with Youth Day celebrated on 25 May, a national holiday which doubled as the official celebration of Josip Broz Tito's birthday).
- **^{E}** Due to the match-fixing scandal in the last round of the 1985–86 season, the Football Association of Yugoslavia (FSJ) ruled that ten clubs would start the next 1986–87 Yugoslav First League season with 6 points docked, among them Dinamo Zagreb. Vardar, who had not been deducted any points, won the title with a single point ahead of Partizan and was sent to participate in the 1987–88 European Cup, with Dinamo finishing 8th. After post-season appeals and legal actions took by clubs against the FSJ, the final court ruling was handed down in July 1987, which overturned the original deductions and ordered the table to be restored. This meant that the title was retroactively taken from Vardar and given back to Partizan, and also that Dinamo was recognized in records as finishing in 6th place.

== Achievements ==
=== Domestic ===
- **Croatian First League**
  - Winners (25): 1992–93, 1995–96, 1996–97, 1997–98, 1998–99, 1999–2000, 2002–03, 2005–06, 2006–07, 2007–08, 2008–09, 2009–10, 2010–11, 2011–12, 2012–13, 2013–14, 2014–15, 2015–16, 2017–18, 2018–19, 2019–20, 2020–21, 2021–22, 2022–23, 2023–24
  - Runners-up (5): 1994–95, 2000–01, 2003–04, 2016–17, 2024–25
- **Yugoslav First League**
  - Winners (9): 1923, 1926, 1928, 1936–37, 1939–40, 1947–48, 1953–54, 1957–58, 1981–82
  - Runners-up (11): 1946–47, 1951, 1959–60, 1962–63, 1965–66, 1966–67, 1968–69, 1976–77, 1978–79, 1989–90, 1990–91
- **Croatian Football Cup**
  - Winners (17): 1994, 1996, 1997, 1998, 2001, 2002, 2004, 2007, 2008, 2009, 2011, 2012, 2015, 2016, 2018, 2021, 2024
  - Runners-up (7): 1992, 1993, 1995, 2000, 2014, 2017, 2019
- **Yugoslav Football Cup**
  - Winners (8): 1938, 1951, 1960, 1963, 1965, 1969, 1980, 1983
  - Runners-up (8): 1950, 1964, 1966, 1972, 1976, 1982, 1985, 1986
- **Croatian Super Cup**
  - Winners (8): 2002, 2003, 2006, 2010, 2013, 2019, 2022, 2023
  - Runners-up (4): 1993, 1994, 2004, 2014
- **Yugoslav Super Cup**
  - Runners-up (1): 1969

=== International ===
- **Inter-Cities Fairs Cup**
  - Winners (1): 1966–67
  - Runners-up (1): 1962–63
- **Balkans Cup**
  - Winners (1): 1976
