= 1953–54 NK Dinamo Zagreb season =

Dinamo Zagreb
1953–54 season
- President: Ivica Kolić
- Manager: Ivan Jazbinšek
- 1. Federal League: Champions (2nd title)
- Marshal Tito Cup: Semi-final
- Top goalscorer: League: Dionizije Dvornić (15); All: Dionizije Dvornić (21)

The 1953–54 season was Dinamo Zagreb's eighth season in Yugoslavia's First Federal League, the country's top level football championship. Led by manager Ivan Jazbinšek and fueled by goals provided by the club's prolific striker Dionizije Dvornić, Dinamo ended the season on top of the table, one point in front of Partizan and four points ahead of previous season's champions Red Star.

== Players ==
=== Squad ===
Note: The following is the full list of players who appeared in league matches for Dinamo in the 1953–54 season. However, only players who started at least 10 league games are included in historic records as having been members of the championship-winning squad, according to NK Dinamo Zagreb's 1945–1985 official almanac. Those players are listed in bold.

Note: Flags indicate national team as defined under FIFA eligibility rules; some limited exceptions apply. Players may hold more than one non-FIFA nationality.

No.	Pos.	Nation	Player
---	GK	(Socialist Federal Republic of Yugoslavia) YUG	**Branko Kralj**
---	GK	(Socialist Federal Republic of Yugoslavia) YUG	**Vladimir Majerović**
---	DF	(Socialist Federal Republic of Yugoslavia) YUG	Ivica Banožić
---	DF	(Socialist Federal Republic of Yugoslavia) YUG	**Tomislav Crnković**
---	DF	(Socialist Federal Republic of Yugoslavia) YUG	Drago Horvat
---	DF	(Socialist Federal Republic of Yugoslavia) YUG	**Josip Šikić**
---	MF	(Socialist Federal Republic of Yugoslavia) YUG	Dragutin Cizarić
---	MF	(Socialist Federal Republic of Yugoslavia) YUG	Emil Ferković
---	MF	(Socialist Federal Republic of Yugoslavia) YUG	**Ivica Horvat**
---	MF	(Socialist Federal Republic of Yugoslavia) YUG	Dragutin Kukec

No.	Pos.	Nation	Player
---	MF	(Socialist Federal Republic of Yugoslavia) YUG	**Lav Mantula**
---	MF	(Socialist Federal Republic of Yugoslavia) YUG	**Branko Režek**
---	FW	(Socialist Federal Republic of Yugoslavia) YUG	**Aleksandar Benko**
---	FW	(Socialist Federal Republic of Yugoslavia) YUG	**Željko Čajkovski**
---	FW	(Socialist Federal Republic of Yugoslavia) YUG	Zvonimir Cimermančić
---	FW	(Socialist Federal Republic of Yugoslavia) YUG	**Vladimir Čonč**
---	FW	(Socialist Federal Republic of Yugoslavia) YUG	**Dionizije Dvornić**
---	FW	(Socialist Federal Republic of Yugoslavia) YUG	**Luka Lipošinović**
---	FW	(Socialist Federal Republic of Yugoslavia) YUG	**Stojan Osojnak**
---	FW	(Socialist Federal Republic of Yugoslavia) YUG	Zvonko Strnad

== First Federal League ==
=== Results summary ===
Overall								Home						Away					
Pld	W	D	L	GF	GA	GD	Pts	W	D	L	GF	GA	GD	W	D	L	GF	GA	GD
26	19	4	3	72	22	+50	42	11	1	1	40	10	+30	8	3	2	32	12	+20

=== Matches ===
M	Date	Opponents	Venue	Result	Score F–A	Dinamo scorers	Attendance	Ref
1	30 August 1953	Sarajevo	A	W	3–1	Benko 10', Čajkovski 21', Dvornić 63'	14,000	
3	9 September 1953	Partizan	H	W	2–0	Dvornić 29', Čonč 33'	20,000	
4	13 September 1953	Radnički	A	D	0–0		25,000	
2	17 September 1953	BSK	A	W	2–0	Benko 10', Režek 20', Čonč 51'	15,000	
5	20 September 1953	Proleter Osijek	H	W	6–2	Benko 27', 33', 88', Dvornić 34', Čonč 43', Čajkovski 55'	20,000	
6	26 September 1953	Spartak Subotica	A	W	2–1	Čonč 7', Benko 42'	10,000	
7	7 October 1953	Vojvodina	H	L	0–2		20,000	
8	10 October 1953	Hajduk Split	A	L	0–1		16,000	
9	25 October 1953	Rabotnički	A	W	5–1	Benko 35', 64', 71', 76', Dvornić 89'	10,000	
10	11 November 1953	Vardar	H	W	2–0	Režek 20', Benko 88'	8,000	
11	15 November 1953	Odred Ljubljana	H	W	5–3	Benko 3', Čajkovski 4', Dvornić 6', 36', Mantula 83'	12,000	
12	2 December 1953	Red Star	A	D	0–0		35,000	
13	6 December 1953	Lokomotiva	H	W	1–0	Čonč 75'	10,000	
14	13 December 1953	Sarajevo	H	W	5–0	Čajkovski 39', Dvornić 48', 50', 71', Luka Lipošinović 70'	12,000	
15	20 December 1953	BSK	H	D	1–1	Čonč 63'	10,000	
16	14 February 1954	Partizan	A	L	0–1		25,000	
17	21 February 1954	Radnički	H	W	4–1	Dvornić 21', Čonč 35', 61', Benko 71'	7,000	
18	4 March 1954	Proleter Osijek	A	W	5–2	Benko 8', Osojnak 25', Čonč 44', 65', Čajkovski 58'	6,000	
19	7 March 1954	Spartak Subotica	H	W	5–0	Osojnak 35', 75', Čajkovski 60', Mantula 70', B. Čikoš 71' (o.g.)	25,000	
20	14 March 1954	Vojvodina	A	W	1–0	Dvornić 59'	10,000	
21	4 April 1954	Hajduk Split	H	W	3–1	Čonč 35', Čajkovski 60', Osojnak 62'	35,000	
22	7 April 1954	Rabotnički	H	W	5–0	K. Gičevski 2' (o.g.), Čajkovski 6', 29', Dvornić 45', 65'	5,000	
23	11 April 1954	Vardar	A	D	1–1	Čajkovski 55'	15,000	
24	18 April 1954	Odred Ljubljana	A	W	6–4	Lipošinović 7', Čajkovski 22', Čonč 33', 37, Dvornić 82', Osojnak 89'	6,000	
25	25 April 1954	Red Star	H	W	1–0	Osojnak 90'	40,000	
26	2 May 1954	Lokomotiva	A	W	6–0	Osojnak 9', 83', Čajkovski 30', 35', Lipošinović 74', Dvornić 78'	15,000	

=== Classification ===
Pos	Team	Pld	W	D	L	GF	GA	GR	Pts
1	Dinamo Zagreb (C)	26	19	4	3	72	22	3.273	42
2	Partizan	26	18	5	3	77	30	2.567	41
3	Red Star Belgrade	26	17	4	5	51	22	2.318	38
4	Hajduk Split	26	16	3	7	55	34	1.618	35
5	Vojvodina	26	14	5	7	60	37	1.622	33

Source: rsssf.org
Rules for classification: 1st points; 2nd goal average
(C) Champions

== Marshal Tito Cup ==
The 1953 season of the Yugoslav national cup was played over three months, between August and November. In the first round proper, which featured 16 clubs playing in single legs, Dinamo knocked out third-level side Metalac Zagreb 4–2. In the quarter-final Dinamo played away at rivals FK Partizan, and earned a hard-won victory after a 5–5 draw after extra time and 8–7 victory in the ensuing penalty shoot-out.

In the semi-final, played on 1 November, Dinamo hosted another Belgrade-based club, BSK, in what turned out to become one of the most unusual cup matches in Yugoslav football, a drawn-out affair played over three days which eventually led to BSK progressing through to the final in a replay.

== Players ==
=== Squad statistics ===
Key

Pos = Playing position

Nat. = Nationality

DoB (Age) = Date of birth (age)

Apps = Appearances

GK = Goalkeeper

DF = Defender

MF = Midfielder

FW = Forward

Numbers indicate starting appearances + appearances as substitute. Goals column shows total goals scored, numbers in brackets indicate penalties scored.
Players with name struck through and marked † left the club during the playing season.
Age as of 30 August 1953, first league matchday of the season.

Pos.	Nat.	Name	DoB (Age)	League		Cup		Total	
Pos.	Nat.	Name	DoB (Age)	Apps	Goals	Apps	Goals	Apps	Goals
FW	(Socialist Federal Republic of Yugoslavia)	Dionizije Dvornić	27 April 1926 (aged 27)	26	15	4	6	30	21
MF	(Socialist Federal Republic of Yugoslavia)	Vladimir Čonč	13 January 1928 (aged 25)	26	13	4	0	30	13
DF	(Socialist Federal Republic of Yugoslavia)	Josip Šikić	4 August 1929 (aged 24)	25	0	0	0	25	0
FW	(Socialist Federal Republic of Yugoslavia)	Željko Čajkovski	5 May 1925 (aged 28)	24	13	3	3	27	16
MF	(Socialist Federal Republic of Yugoslavia)	Branko Režek	b. 1928	23	2	3	0	26	2
FW	(Socialist Federal Republic of Yugoslavia)	Aleksandar Benko	16 February 1925 (aged 28)	21	14	4	0	25	14
MF	(Socialist Federal Republic of Yugoslavia)	Lav Mantula	8 December 1928 (aged 24)	21	2	?		23	0
DF	(Socialist Federal Republic of Yugoslavia)	Tomislav Crnković	17 June 1929 (aged 24)	20	0	4	0	24	0
DF	(Socialist Federal Republic of Yugoslavia)	Ivica Horvat	16 July 1926 (aged 27)	20	0			23	0
GK	(Socialist Federal Republic of Yugoslavia)	Branko Kralj	10 March 1924 (aged 29)	16	0	1	0	17	0
FW	(Socialist Federal Republic of Yugoslavia)	Stojan Osojnak	11 June 1923 (aged 30)	10	8	1	1	11	9
FW	(Socialist Federal Republic of Yugoslavia)	Luka Lipošinović	12 May 1933 (aged 20)	10	3	1	1	11	4
GK	(Socialist Federal Republic of Yugoslavia)	Vladimir Majerović		10	0	3	0	13	0
MF	(Socialist Federal Republic of Yugoslavia)	Emil Ferković		10	0	0	0	0	0
MF	(Socialist Federal Republic of Yugoslavia)	Dragutin Cizarić		10	0			13	0
DF	(Socialist Federal Republic of Yugoslavia)	Drago Horvat		6	0	0	0	6	0
DF	(Socialist Federal Republic of Yugoslavia)	Ivica Banožić		3	0	1	0	4	0
MF	(Socialist Federal Republic of Yugoslavia)	Dragutin Kukec		3	0	0	0	3	0
FW	(Socialist Federal Republic of Yugoslavia)	Zvonimir Cimermančić	26 August 1917 (aged 36)	2	0	3	1	5	1
FW	(Socialist Federal Republic of Yugoslavia)	Zvonko Strnad	15 January 1926 (aged 27)	1	0	1	0	2	0
MF	(Socialist Federal Republic of Yugoslavia)	Franjo Beseredi	11 February 1928 (aged 25)	0	0	1	0	1	0
