= 1951 Yugoslav Cup =

1951 Yugoslav Football Cup
5th Marshal Tito Cup

Tournament details
- Country: Yugoslavia
- Dates: 11 November – 23 December
- Teams: 64

Final positions
- Champions: Dinamo Zagreb (1st title)
- Runners-up: Vojvodina

Tournament statistics
- Matches played: 64
- Goals scored in penalty shoot-outs not included.

The 1951 Yugoslav Cup was the 5th season of the top football knockout competition in SFR Yugoslavia, the Yugoslav Cup (Serbo-Croatian: Kup Jugoslavije; Macedonian: Куп на Југославија, Slovene: Pokal Jugoslavije), also known as the "Marshal Tito Cup" (Kup Maršala Tita), since its establishment in 1946.

== Calendar ==
The Yugoslav Cup was a tournament for which clubs from all tiers of the football pyramid were eligible to enter. In addition, amateur teams put together by individual Yugoslav People's Army garrisons and various factories and industrial plants were also encouraged to enter, which meant that each cup edition could have several thousands of teams in its preliminary stages. These teams would play through a number of qualifying rounds before reaching the first round proper, in which they would be paired with top-flight teams.

Round	Legs	Date played	Fixtures	Clubs
First round (round of 64)	Single	11 November 1951	32	64 → 32
Second round (round of 32)	Single	18 November 1951	16	32 → 16
Second round (round of 16)	Single	25 November 1951	8	16 → 8
Quarter-finals	Single	2 December 1951	4	8 → 4
Semi-finals	Single	9 December 1951	2	4 → 2
Final	Double	16 and 23 December 1951	2	2 → 1

== First round ==
In the following tables winning teams are marked in bold; teams from outside top level are marked in italic script.

Tie no	Home team	Score	Away team
1	**Vardar**	7–1	Dubočica
2	**Napredak Kruševac**	3–0	Timok
3	**Velež Mostar**	3–0 (w/o)	Zmaj Makarska
4	**Bokelj**	3–1	Željezničar
5	**Bačka (Bačka Palanka)**	1–0	BSK Belgrade
6	**Radnički Niš**	1–0	Vardar II
7	**Pula**	2–1 (aet)	Odred Ljubljana
8	Zadar	1–2	**Hajduk Split**
9	**Srbobran**	3–2	Slavija Novi Sad
10	Slaven Borovo	0–2	**Spartak Subotica**
11	Sloboda Titovo Užice	1–11	**Partizan**
12	Lokomotiva Rijeka	2–3	**Kvarner**
13	Rudar Trbovlje	0–6	**Lokomotiva Zagreb**
14	Čelik Zenica	0–3	**FK Sarajevo**
15	Borac Čačak	0–1	**BSK Belgrade II**
16	**Naprijed Sisak**	1–0	Borac Zagreb
17	**Red Star Belgrade**	7–0	6. Oktobar Kikinda
18	**Radnik Velika Gorica**	2–1	Zagreb
19	Slavija Karlovac	0–3	**Dinamo Zagreb**
20	Red Star Slavonski Brod	1–2	**Jedinstvo Brčko**
21	**Proleter Zrenjanin**	4–0	Spartak Debeljača
22	**Mačva Šabac**	8–6 (6–6, 4–3)	Radnički Obrenovac
23	**Metalac Zagreb**	2–1	Sloboda Varaždin
24	Bosna Sarajevo	0–1	**Proleter Teslić**
25	Graničar Bela Crkva	1–2	**Dinamo Pančevo**
26	**Sloga Petrovac**	4–1	Radnički Beograd
27	Bjelovar	1–10	**Proleter Osijek**
28	**Vojvodina**	4–1	Milicionar Beograd
29	**Jedinstvo Bačka Topola**	2–0	Sport Bezdan
30	**Lovćen**	2–0	Budućnost Titograd
31	**Mura**	4–3	Tekstilac Varaždin
32	Pobeda Prilep	1–2	**Rabonički**

== Round of 32 ==
Tie no	Home team	Score	Away team
1.	Spartak Subotica	0–2	Jedinstvo Bačka Topola
2.	Velež Mostar	8–1	Lovćen
3.	Hajduk Split	3–0 sl	Bokelj
4.	Radnički Niš	0–2	Red Star Belgrade
5.	Dinamo Zagreb	9–0	Radnik Velika Gorica
6.	Srbobran	0–6	Vojvodina
7.	Sarajevo	2–1	Proleter Teslić
8.	Dinamo Pančevo	1–2	Mačva Šabac
9	OFK Beograd II	2–1	Vardar
10.	Pula	2–1	Kvarner
11.	Naprijed Sisak	1–2	Metalac Zagreb
12.	Partizan	15–0	Sloga Petrovac
13.	Rabotnički	3–3 (3–3, 2–1) draw	Napredak Kruševac
14.	Proleter Zrenjanin	3–2	Bačka (Bačka Palanka)
15.	Proleter Osijek	2–0	Jedinstvo Brčko
16.	Lokomotiva Zagreb	4–1	Mura

== Round of 16 ==
Tie no	Home team	Score	Away team
1.	Red Star Belgrade	4–1	Mačva Šabac
2.	Metalac Zagreb	2–1	Lokomotiva Zagreb
3.	Dinamo Zagreb	1–1 (1–1, 1–0) žreb	Velež Mostar
4.	Proleter Zrenjanin	5–0	Jedinstvo Bačka Topola
5.	Hajduk Split	3–1	BSK II
6.	Proleter Osijek	1–0	Sarajevo
7.	Vojvodina	4–1	Rabotnički
8.	Partizan	7–0	Pula

== Quarter-finals ==
Tie no	Home team	Score	Away team
1.	Red Star Belgrade	5–0	Metalac Zagreb
2.	Dinamo Zagreb	8–0	Proleter Zrenjanin
3.	Hajduk Split	0–0 žreb	Proleter Osijek
4.	Vojvodina	2–0	Partizan

== Semi-finals ==
Tie no	Home team	Score	Away team
1.	Red Star Belgrade	0–1	Dinamo Zagreb
2.	Hajduk Split	0–2	Vojvodina

== Final ==
=== First leg ===
16 December 1951

Dinamo Zagreb	2–0	Vojvodina
Dvornić 78', 83'

Maksimir Stadium, Zagreb
Attendance: 15,000
Referee: R. Rakić (Sarajevo)

Dinamo Zagreb	Vojvodina

GK	1	(Socialist Federal Republic of Yugoslavia) Branko Stinčić
MF	2	(Socialist Federal Republic of Yugoslavia) Drago Horvat
FW	3	(Socialist Federal Republic of Yugoslavia) Tomislav Crnković
DF	4	(Socialist Federal Republic of Yugoslavia) Branko Režek
DF	5	(Socialist Federal Republic of Yugoslavia) Ivica Horvat
DF	6	(Socialist Federal Republic of Yugoslavia) Dragutin Cizarić
DF	7	(Socialist Federal Republic of Yugoslavia) Aleksandar Benko
MF	8	(Socialist Federal Republic of Yugoslavia) Božidar Senčar
MF	9	(Socialist Federal Republic of Yugoslavia) Franjo Wölfl
FW	10	(Socialist Federal Republic of Yugoslavia) Željko Čajkovski
FW	11	(Socialist Federal Republic of Yugoslavia) Dionizije Dvornić
Manager:
(Socialist Federal Republic of Yugoslavia) Bernard Hügl

GK	1	(Socialist Federal Republic of Yugoslavia) Lazar Vasić
MF	2	(Socialist Federal Republic of Yugoslavia) Sava Selena
FW	3	(Socialist Federal Republic of Yugoslavia) Dušan Ristić
DF	4	(Socialist Federal Republic of Yugoslavia) Vujadin Boškov
DF	5	(Socialist Federal Republic of Yugoslavia) Sima Milovanov
DF	6	(Socialist Federal Republic of Yugoslavia) Dragić Živković
DF	7	(Socialist Federal Republic of Yugoslavia) Silvester Šereš
MF	8	(Socialist Federal Republic of Yugoslavia) Zdravko Rajkov
MF	9	(Socialist Federal Republic of Yugoslavia) Dobrosav Krstić
FW	10	(Socialist Federal Republic of Yugoslavia) Todor Veselinović
FW	11	(Socialist Federal Republic of Yugoslavia) Radomir Krstić
Manager:
(Socialist Federal Republic of Yugoslavia) Ljubiša Broćić

=== Second leg ===
23 December 1951

Vojvodina	0–2	Dinamo Zagreb
		Wölfl 68'; Čajkovski 82'

JNA Stadium, Belgrade
Attendance: 20,000
Referee: B. Nedelkovski (Skopje)

Vojvodina	Dinamo Zagreb

GK	1	(Socialist Federal Republic of Yugoslavia) Lazar Vasić
MF	2	(Socialist Federal Republic of Yugoslavia) Sava Selena
FW	3	(Socialist Federal Republic of Yugoslavia) Dušan Ristić
DF	4	(Socialist Federal Republic of Yugoslavia) Vujadin Boškov
DF	5	(Socialist Federal Republic of Yugoslavia) Sima Milovanov
DF	6	(Socialist Federal Republic of Yugoslavia) Dragić Živković
DF	7	(Socialist Federal Republic of Yugoslavia) Silvester Šereš
MF	8	(Socialist Federal Republic of Yugoslavia) Zdravko Rajkov
MF	9	(Socialist Federal Republic of Yugoslavia) Dobrosav Krstić
FW	10	(Socialist Federal Republic of Yugoslavia) Todor Veselinović
FW	11	(Socialist Federal Republic of Yugoslavia) Radomir Krstić
Manager:
(Socialist Federal Republic of Yugoslavia) Ljubiša Broćić

GK	1	(Socialist Federal Republic of Yugoslavia) Branko Stinčić
MF	2	(Socialist Federal Republic of Yugoslavia) Drago Horvat
FW	3	(Socialist Federal Republic of Yugoslavia) Tomislav Crnković
DF	4	(Socialist Federal Republic of Yugoslavia) Branko Režek
DF	5	(Socialist Federal Republic of Yugoslavia) Ivica Horvat
DF	6	(Socialist Federal Republic of Yugoslavia) Dragutin Cizarić
DF	7	(Socialist Federal Republic of Yugoslavia) Aleksandar Benko
MF	8	(Socialist Federal Republic of Yugoslavia) Božidar Senčar
MF	9	(Socialist Federal Republic of Yugoslavia) Franjo Wölfl
FW	10	(Socialist Federal Republic of Yugoslavia) Željko Čajkovski
FW	11	(Socialist Federal Republic of Yugoslavia) Dionizije Dvornić
Manager:
(Socialist Federal Republic of Yugoslavia) Bernard Hügl

== See also ==
- 1951 Yugoslav First League
- 1951 Yugoslav Second League
