= 1950 Yugoslav First League =

Prva savezna liga
- Season: 1950
- Champions: Hajduk Split (3rd title)
- Relegated: Budućnost
- Top goalscorer: Marko Valok (17)

The First Federal League of Yugoslavia of 1950 (Prva savezna liga Jugoslavije), colloquially known as the Yugoslav First League of 1950, was the highest tier football competition played in communist Yugoslavia during 1950.

== League table ==
| Pos | Team | Pld | W | D | L | GF | GA | GR | Pts | Relegation |
|---|---|---|---|---|---|---|---|---|---|---|
| 1 | Hajduk Split (C) | 18 | 10 | 8 | 0 | 28 | 13 | 2.154 | 28 | |
| 2 | Red Star Belgrade | 18 | 12 | 2 | 4 | 44 | 18 | 2.444 | 26 | |
| 3 | Partizan | 18 | 12 | 2 | 4 | 46 | 19 | 2.421 | 26 | |
| 4 | Dinamo Zagreb | 18 | 9 | 4 | 5 | 23 | 17 | 1.353 | 22 | |
| 5 | Sarajevo | 18 | 7 | 3 | 8 | 30 | 27 | 1.111 | 17 | |
| 6 | Naša Krila | 18 | 5 | 4 | 9 | 18 | 29 | 0.621 | 14 | |
| 7 | BSK Belgrade | 18 | 4 | 6 | 8 | 19 | 32 | 0.594 | 14 | |
| 8 | Lokomotiva | 18 | 4 | 5 | 9 | 18 | 28 | 0.643 | 13 | |
| 9 | Spartak Subotica | 18 | 3 | 4 | 11 | 15 | 29 | 0.517 | 10 | Relegation to Yugoslav Second League (Note: At the end of the season, Naša Krila Zemun, a Yugoslav airforce football club, was dissolved. Having this in mind, only one team was relegated at the end of the season while four were promoted from the Second League.) |
| 10 | Budućnost (R) | 18 | 3 | 4 | 11 | 15 | 44 | 0.341 | 10 | Relegation to Yugoslav Second League |

Source: rsssf.org
Rules for classification: 1st points; 2nd goal average.
(C) Champions; (R) Relegated

== Results ==
| Home \ Away | BSK | BUD | DIN | HAJ | LOK | NAŠ | PAR | RSB | SAR | SPA |
|---|---|---|---|---|---|---|---|---|---|---|
| BSK Belgrade | | 4–1 | 0–2 | 2–2 | 1–1 | 0–1 | 1–4 | 2–5 | 0–0 | 1–1 |
| Budućnost | 0–0 | | 0–1 | 1–2 | 0–1 | 2–2 | 2–4 | 3–2 | 2–1 | 2–0 |
| Dinamo Zagreb | 1–1 | 2–0 | | 1–3 | 1–1 | 1–1 | 2–1 | 1–0 | 2–0 | 2–1 |
| Hajduk Split | 5–2 | 2–0 | 1–0 | | 1–1 | 0–0 | 0–0 | 2–1 | 2–2 | 2–0 |
| Lokomotiva | 2–0 | 2–0 | 0–3 | 0–1 | | 0–2 | 3–1 | 2–2 | 1–2 | 1–1 |
| Naša Krila | 2–3 | 0–0 | 0–2 | 0–1 | 2–1 | | 1–3 | 0–1 | 3–0 | 2–1 |
| Partizan | 0–1 | 10–0 | 2–0 | 0–0 | 4–1 | 2–1 | | 2–1 | 3–1 | 3–0 |
| Red Star | 3–0 | 4–0 | 3–0 | 2–2 | 1–0 | 6–0 | 3–1 | | 4–2 | 2–0 |
| Sarajevo | 0–1 | 6–1 | 1–0 | 1–1 | 4–0 | 3–0 | 2–5 | 0–2 | | 4–0 |
| Spartak Subotica | 2–0 | 1–1 | 2–2 | 0–1 | 2–1 | 3–1 | 0–1 | 1–2 | 0–1 | |

Source: DataSoccer.it
Legend: Blue = home team win; Yellow = draw; Red = away team win.

== Top scorers ==
| Rank | Player | Club | Goals |
|---|---|---|---|
| 1 | (Socialist Federal Republic of Yugoslavia) Marko Valok | Partizan | 17 |
| 2 | (Socialist Federal Republic of Yugoslavia) Kosta Tomašević | Red Star | 14 |
| 3 | (Socialist Federal Republic of Yugoslavia) Rajko Mitić | Red Star | 11 |
| 4 | (Socialist Federal Republic of Yugoslavia) Franjo Wölfl | Dinamo Zagreb | 10 |
| 5 | (Socialist Federal Republic of Yugoslavia) Stjepan Bobek | Partizan | 6 |
| 5 | (Socialist Federal Republic of Yugoslavia) Ratomir Čabrić | BSK Belgrade | 6 |
| 5 | (Socialist Federal Republic of Yugoslavia) Frane Matošić | Hajduk Split | 6 |
| 5 | (Socialist Federal Republic of Yugoslavia) Prvoslav Mihajlović | Partizan | 6 |

== Cup ==
=== Qualification ===
Partizan Beograd 4 – 1 Oktobar

Kvarner Rijeka 0 – 1 Partizan

(rest unknown)

=== Round of Sixteen ===
Partizan Beograd 5 – 1 Proleter Osijek

X x – x X

X x – x X

X x – x X

X x – x X

BSK Beograd – x X

Dinamo Zagreb x – x X

Crvena Zvezda Beograd x – x X

=== Quarter finals ===
Crvena Zvezda Beograd x – x X

Partizan Beograd 3 – 0 BSK Beograd

X x – x X

Dinamo Zagreb x – x X

=== Semi finals ===
Crvena Zvezda Beograd 1 – 0 Partizan

Dinamo Zagreb 2 – 1 Hajduk Split

=== Finals ===
24 December 1950 – Belgrade, Serbia

Red Star Belgrade 1 – 1 NK Dinamo Zagreb

Stadium: JNA Stadium

Attendance: 50,000

Referee: M. Matančić (Belgrade)

Dinamo: Branko Stinčić, Svemir Delić, Tomislav Crnković, Krešo Pukšec, Ivan Horvat, Dragutin Cizarić, Branko Režek, Božidar Senčar, Franjo Wölfl, Željko Čajkovski, Zvonko Strnad

Crvena Zvezda: Srđan Mrkušić, Dimitrije Tadić, Ivan Zvekanović, Bela Palfi, Milivoje Đurđević, Predrag Đajić, Tihomir Ognjanov, Rajko Mitić, Kosta Tomašević, Siniša Zlatković, Branislav Vukosavljević

=== Finals Replay ===
31 December 1950 – Belgrade, Serbia

Dinamo Zagreb 0 – 3 Crvena Zvezda

Stadium: JNA Stadium

Attendance: 45,000

Referee: Leo Lemešić (Split)

Dinamo: Branko Stinčić, Svemir Delić, Tomislav Crnković, Krešimir Pukšec, Ivan Horvat, Dragutin Cizarić, Stjepan Kašner, Branko Režek, Dionizije Dvornić, Božidar Senčar, Zvonko Strnad

Crvena Zvezda: Srđan Mrkušić, Diskic, Ivan Zvekanović, Bela Palfi, Milivoje Đurđević, Predrag Đajić, Tihomir Ognjanov, Rajko Mitić, Kosta Tomašević, Siniša Zlatković, Branislav Vukosavljević

== See also ==
- 1950 Yugoslav Second League
- Yugoslav Cup
- Yugoslav League Championship
- Football Association of Yugoslavia
