= Stojan Osojnak =

Croatian footballer and manager

Personal information
- Date of birth: 11 June 1923
- Place of birth: Abbazia, Kingdom of Italy
- Date of death: 10 October 2016 (aged 93)
- Place of death: Lugano, Switzerland
- Position: Forward

Senior career*
Years	Team	Apps	(Gls)
1939–1942	Eneo		
1943	Litorija Rijeka		
1946–1947	FD Pazin		
1948–1949	Opatija		
1949–1953	Kvarner Rijeka		(45)
1953–1955	Dinamo Zagreb	22	(11)
1955–1959	Rijeka		(26)

Managerial career
- 1960–1961: Rijeka
- 1962–1963: Rijeka
- 1964–1967: Rijeka
- 1967–1968: Sion
- 1969–1970: Chiasso
- 1977: Chiasso
- 1993: Chiasso
- * Club domestic league appearances and goals

Stojan Osojnak (1923-2016) was a Croatian and Yugoslav football player and manager.

== Career ==
Osojnak played for Rijeka and Dinamo Zagreb in the 1940s and 1950s. He is considered as the most notable football player from Opatija, and one of the five greatest forwards in the early history of HNK Rijeka (along with Bruno Veselica, Miodrag Kustudić, Milan Radović and Tonči Gulin).

Osojnak was also notable for appearing in the first ever match played by Dinamo Zagreb on 23 June 1945, a friendly game against the Yugoslav Air Force team played in Zagreb. However, Osojnak was dropped from the squad before the club started competing in post-war championships and he did not appear for the club in competitive matches in the following seasons.

Between the late 1940s and early 1950s he had his first spell at NK Rijeka (named "NK Kvarner" at the time) and scored 45 league goals for the club in the period from 1949 and 1953. In 1953 he was signed by Dinamo Zagreb and this time he appeared in 22 league matches and scored 11 goals over the next three Yugoslav First League seasons, appearing alongside other Dinamo greats such as Željko Čajkovski, Tomislav Crnković, Dionizije Dvornić, Vladimir Čonč and Luka Lipošinović. He is mainly remembered for his performances in the title-winning 1953–54 season, in which he scored 9 goals in 10 league appearances for the Blues, including the crucial goal against Red Star Belgrade at Maksimir on 25 April 1954, which sealed Dinamo's second championship triumph.

In 1955 he returned to Rijeka and played there until his retirement in 1959, scoring 26 goals for the club in his last four playing seasons. After retiring from active football, Osojnak started working as manager and had three managing spells at NK Rijeka (1960–1961, 1962–1963 with Angelo Zikovich and 1964–1967), his greatest achievements being finishing 4th in the Yugoslav championship in 1964–65 and 1965–66.

He also had managing spells at several clubs in Switzerland, including FC Sion (1967–1968, replacing his former Dinamo teammate Lev Mantula) and FC Chiasso (1969–1970 and 1993).

== Death ==
Osojnak died in Switzerland, aged 93. He was reputed to be the oldest living Dinamo player at the time of his death and was 'succeeded' by then 91-year old Željko Čajkovski.

== Honours ==
NK Rijeka

- Yugoslav Second League: 1952, 1957–58

Dinamo Zagreb

- Yugoslav First League: 1953–54
