= 1957–58 Yugoslav First League =

Prva savezna liga
- Season: 1957–58
- Dates: 11 August 1957 – 27 April 1958
- Champions: Dinamo Zagreb (3rd title)
- Relegated: RNK Split; Spartak Subotica; OFK Belgrade; NK Zagreb
- European Cup: Dinamo Zagreb
- Top goalscorer: Todor Veselinović (19)

The 1957–58 Yugoslav First League season was the 12th season of the First Federal League (Serbo-Croatian: Prva savezna liga), the top level association football league of SFR Yugoslavia, since its establishment in 1946. Fourteen teams contested the competition, with Dinamo Zagreb winning their third title and qualifying for the 1958–59 European Cup.

At the end of season four teams were relegated instead of the usual two because the Football Association of Yugoslavia decided to reduce the league to 12 teams for the following season.

== Teams ==
At the end of the previous season FK Sarajevo and Lokomotiva were relegated from top level. They were replaced by Željezničar and RNK Split.

Team	Location	Federal Republic	Position in 1956–57
Budućnost	Titograd	SR Montenegro	9th
Dinamo Zagreb	Zagreb	SR Croatia	5th
Hajduk Split	Split	SR Croatia	3rd
OFK Belgrade	Belgrade	SR Serbia	6th
Partizan	Belgrade	SR Serbia	4th
Radnički Belgrade	Belgrade	SR Serbia	8th
Red Star	Belgrade	SR Serbia	1st
Spartak Subotica	Subotica	SR Serbia	12th
RNK Split	Split	SR Croatia	—
Vardar	Skopje	SR Macedonia	11th
Velež	Mostar	SR Bosnia and Herzegovina	10th
Vojvodina	Novi Sad	SR Serbia	2nd
NK Zagreb	Zagreb	SR Croatia	7th
Željezničar	Sarajevo	SR Bosnia and Herzegovina	—

== League table ==
Pos	Team	Pld	W	D	L	GF	GA	GR	Pts	Qualification or relegation
1	Dinamo Zagreb (C)	26	15	7	4	53	33	1.606	37	Qualification for European Cup preliminary round
2	Partizan	26	13	7	6	46	33	1.394	33	
3	Radnički Beograd	26	11	6	9	50	38	1.316	28	
4	Red Star Belgrade	26	10	8	8	45	38	1.184	28	
5	Vojvodina	26	12	3	11	55	32	1.719	27	
6	Velež	26	11	4	11	40	42	0.952	26	
7	Vardar	26	10	6	10	30	44	0.682	26	
8	Željezničar	26	9	7	10	47	44	1.068	25	
9	Hajduk Split	26	10	5	11	42	43	0.977	25	
10	Budućnost	26	8	9	9	30	36	0.833	25 (Note: Budućnost and RNK Split had the same goal average so they played two play-off matches to decide who will enter the relegation play-offs. Budućnost won 4–0.)	
11	RNK Split (R)	26	12	1	13	35	42	0.833	25	Qualification for relegation play-offs
12	Spartak Subotica (R)	26	10	4	12	50	45	1.111	24	Qualification for relegation play-offs
13	OFK Belgrade (R)	26	6	8	12	27	50	0.540	20	Relegation to Yugoslav Second League
14	NK Zagreb (R)	26	5	5	16	31	61	0.508	15	Relegation to Yugoslav Second League

Source: rsssf.org
Rules for classification: 1st points; 2nd goal average.
(C) Champions; (R) Relegated

== Results ==
Home \ Away	BUD	DIN	HAJ	OFK	PAR	RBE	RSB	SPA	SPL	VAR	VEL	VOJ	ZAG	ŽEL
Budućnost		0–1	2–0	0–0	2–2	0–1	2–0	0–0	4–1	1–0	1–1	3–1	1–1	1–1
Dinamo Zagreb	1–0		4–0	0–0	1–0	1–1	1–1	3–1	4–1	5–1	4–2	4–1	3–1	1–0
Hajduk Split	3–3	5–1		4–0	1–3	2–1	0–1	1–3	2–2	4–0	1–1	1–0	2–0	3–1
OFK Belgrade	3–1	0–0	3–1		1–1	0–2	0–2	2–1	2–0	0–0	1–2	0–2	3–2	5–1
Partizan	1–0	4–1	5–1	1–1		1–0	2–2	4–2	1–0	0–1	2–1	1–5	3–0	1–1
Radnički Beograd	4–0	4–0	1–1	3–0	4–0		1–5	4–2	3–2	2–2	6–1	2–1	0–0	1–2
Red Star	1–4	1–2	1–0	1–0	2–2	4–4		2–1	2–1	9–1	2–1	2–1	1–1	2–2
Spartak Subotica	0–2	4–4	0–1	5–1	1–2	3–1	0–0		0–1	1–0	5–1	3–1	2–0	3–2
RNK Split	0–2	1–0	2–0	3–0	0–2	1–0	3–0	2–0		4–0	2–0	1–0	4–2	2–1
Vardar	2–0	0–3	2–2	4–2	1–0	3–2	2–1	1–1	3–0		0–1	2–1	1–1	0–0
Velež	0–0	2–3	3–0	3–1	1–1	3–0	2–1	1–3	3–0	1–0		2–0	4–0	1–3
Vojvodina	6–0	0–0	2–1	9–1	2–1	1–1	1–1	3–1	4–0	2–0	0–1		6–1	1–0
NK Zagreb	5–0	2–5	0–1	2–2	1–2	0–2	1–0	2–6	2–1	0–2	2–1	0–5		1–2
Željezničar	1–1	1–1	2–5	0–0	1–4	3–0	3–1	5–2	5–1	1–2	4–1	3–0	2–4	

Source: DataSoccer.it
Legend: Blue = home team win; Yellow = draw; Red = away team win.

== Winning squad ==
Champions:

- Dinamo Zagreb (coach: Gustav Lechner)

players (league matches/league goals):

- Ivica Banožić 18 (0)
- Aleksandar Benko 12 (8)
- Tomislav Crnković 25 (0)
- Vladimir Čonč 20 (4)
- Emil Ferković 5 (0)
- Franjo Gašpert 22 (7)
- Drago Hmelina 8 (1)
- Ivan Horvat 26 (0)
- Bernard Hugl 3 (0)
- Gordan Irović 24 (0)
- Dražan Jerković 22 (17)
- Marijan Kolonić 1 (0)
- Mladen Koščak 22 (0)
- Luka Lipošinović 20 (8)
- Željko Matuš 20 (3)
- Zdravko Prelčec 4 (1)
- Branko Režek 24 (2)
- Ivan Šantek 8 (0)
- Josip Šikić 26 (0)

== Top scorers ==
Rank	Player	Club	Goals
1	(Socialist Federal Republic of Yugoslavia) Todor Veselinović	Vojvodina	19
2	(Socialist Federal Republic of Yugoslavia) Dražan Jerković	Dinamo Zagreb	18
3	(Socialist Federal Republic of Yugoslavia) Radivoj Ognjanović	Radnički Belgrade	14
3	(Socialist Federal Republic of Yugoslavia) Tihomir Ognjanov	Spartak Subotica	14
5	(Socialist Federal Republic of Yugoslavia) Branislav Mihajlović	Partizan	13
5	(Socialist Federal Republic of Yugoslavia) Aleksandar Petaković	Radnički Belgrade	13
5	(Socialist Federal Republic of Yugoslavia) Vojislav Tonković	Spartak Subotica	13
8	(Socialist Federal Republic of Yugoslavia) Zoran Prljinčević	Radnički Belgrade	12
8	(Socialist Federal Republic of Yugoslavia) Ilijas Pašić	Željezničar	12
8	(Socialist Federal Republic of Yugoslavia) Joško Vidošević	Hajduk Split	12

== See also ==
- 1957–58 Yugoslav Second League
- 1957–58 Yugoslav Cup
