= Josip Šikić =

Croatian footballer and manager (born 1929)

Personal information
- Date of birth: 4 August 1929
- Place of birth: Karlobag, Kingdom of Yugoslavia
- Position: Defender

Senior career*
Years	Team	Apps	(Gls)
1953–1962	Dinamo Zagreb	153	(3)
1963–1967	Wacker Innsbruck		
1967–1969	Austria Salzburg	33	(0)

Managerial career
- 1971–1972: Rapid Lienz
- 1972–1973: Austria Salzburg
- * Club domestic league appearances and goals

Josip "Joschi" Šikić (sometimes spelled Josef or Joseph; born 4 August 1929) is a former Croatian and Yugoslav footballer who spent most of his career at Dinamo Zagreb in the period from the early 1950s to early 1960s, with whom he won two championships of Yugoslavia and one Marshal Tito Cup.

== Playing career ==
Šikić was born in 1929 in Konjsko (Cognisco) near the coastal town of Karlobag (Carlopago) on today's northern Adriatic coast of Croatia.

A product of Dinamo Zagreb academy, Šikić played for the Blues from 1953 to 1962, appearing in 153 Yugoslav First Federal League matches and scoring three goals. He helped the club win the 1953–54 championship and the 1959–60 Marshal Tito Cup, where he played in the final against Partizan.

During his time at the club he played with a number of club's greatest names of the 1950s and 1960s, such as Željko Čajkovski, Tomislav Crnković, Dražan Jerković, and Luka Lipošinović.

In 1963, aged 33, Šikić moved abroad, to Austrian second-tier side Wacker Innsbruck, together with his Dinamo teammate Ivan Šantek, then aged 31, in a team which also had the former Austrian international Theodor Wagner and which was managed by Theodor Brinek Sr.

With Šikić and Šantek Wacker finished the season in the Regionalliga West undefeated, with 16 wins and 6 draws in 22 matches, securing first place and promotion to the Austrian Bundesliga at the end of the 1963–64 season. Šikić stayed with Wacker for the next three seasons, appearing in 72 Bundesliga matches for the club, without scoring any goals.

In his third season in Budesliga, under coach Leopold Šťastný, Šikić helped Wacker finish second in the Austrian championship 1966–67 season, level on points with Rapid Wien, in what was at the time the club's best result in history.

In 1967, now aged 37, he moved to SV Austria Salzburg, where he spent two more years before retiring in 1969.

== Managerial career ==
After retiring from active football he worked as manager, first at the now-defunct club SV Rapid Lienz 1971–1972, and then at Austria Salzburg in the 1972–1973 season, finishing 7th in the Austrian championship. From 1976 to 1979 he was a member of the coaching staff at SSW Innsbruck, during the period when his son, Boris Šikić, played for the club.

== Honours ==
=== Player ===
Dinamo Zagreb

- 1. Federal League of Yugoslavia: 1953–54, 1957–58
- Marshal Tito Cup: 1959–60

Wacker Innsbruck

- Regionalliga West (II): 1963–64
- Austrian championship runner-up: 1966–67
