= Srboljub Krivokuća =

Yugoslav and Serbian footballer (1928–2002)

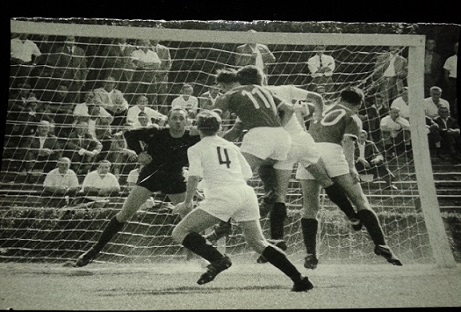
- Krivokuća with Wormatia Worms

Personal information
- Date of birth: 14 March 1928
- Place of birth: Ivanjica, Kingdom of Serbs, Croats and Slovenes
- Date of death: 22 December 2002 (aged 74)
- Place of death: Belgrade, Serbia, FR Yugoslavia
- Height: 1.78 m (5 ft 10 in)
- Position: Goalkeeper

Senior career*
Years	Team	Apps	(Gls)
- Javor Ivanjica
1950–1951	Budućnost Titograd	41	(0)
1952–1957	Red Star Belgrade	67	(0)
1958	Vojvodina	6	(0)
1958–1962	OFK Beograd	72	(0)
1962–1964	Wormatia Worms	31	(0)
1964–1966	Red Star Belgrade	32	(0)
1966–1967	Radnički Kragujevac	11	(0)
Total		260	(0)

International career
1956–1961	Yugoslavia	7	(0)

Managerial career
- 1968: Šumadija Aranđelovac
- 1969-1975: Majdanpek
- 1975-1977: in Kuwait
- 1978-1980: Šumadija 1903
- * Club domestic league appearances and goals

Srboljub Krivokuća (Serbian Cyrillic: Србољуб Кривокућа; 14 March 1928 – 22 December 2002) was a Yugoslav and Serbian football manager and player.

== Club career ==
Krivokuća played for Red Star Belgrade on two occasions, winning three Yugoslav First League titles (1952–53, 1955–56, and 1956–57). He also spent two seasons abroad with Wormatia Worms in West Germany (1962–1964).

== International career ==
At international level, Krivokuća was capped seven times for Yugoslavia between 1956 and 1961. He was a member of the team at two World Cups in 1958 and 1962.

== Managerial career ==
After hanging up his boots, Krivokuća served as manager of several clubs in Yugoslavia and Kuwait.

== Career statistics ==
=== Club ===
Appearances and goals by club, season and competition
Club	Season	League		
Club	Season	Division	Apps	Goals
Budućnost Titograd	1950	Yugoslav First League	12	0
Budućnost Titograd	1951	Yugoslav Second League	29	0
Budućnost Titograd	Total		41	0
Red Star Belgrade	1952–53	Yugoslav First League	14	0
Red Star Belgrade	1953–54	Yugoslav First League	15	0
Red Star Belgrade	1954–55	Yugoslav First League	7	0
Red Star Belgrade	1955–56	Yugoslav First League	19	0
Red Star Belgrade	1956–57	Yugoslav First League	9	0
Red Star Belgrade	1957–58	Yugoslav First League	3	0
Red Star Belgrade	Total		67	0
Vojvodina	1957–58	Yugoslav First League	6	0
OFK Beograd	1958–59	Yugoslav Second League	11	0
OFK Beograd	1959–60	Yugoslav First League	19	0
OFK Beograd	1960–61	Yugoslav First League	22	0
OFK Beograd	1961–62	Yugoslav First League	20	0
OFK Beograd	Total		72	0
Wormatia Worms	1962–63	Oberliga Südwest	30	0
Wormatia Worms	1963–64	Regionalliga Südwest	1	0
Wormatia Worms	Total		31	0
Red Star Belgrade	1964–65	Yugoslav First League	7	0
Red Star Belgrade	1965–66	Yugoslav First League	25	0
Red Star Belgrade	Total		32	0
Radnički Kragujevac	1966–67	Yugoslav Second League	11	0
Career total			260	0

=== International ===
Appearances and goals by national team and year
National team	Year	Apps	Goals
Yugoslavia	1956	3	0
Yugoslavia	1957	0	0
Yugoslavia	1958	2	0
Yugoslavia	1959	1	0
Yugoslavia	1960	0	0
Yugoslavia	1961	1	0
Total		7	0

== Honours ==
Red Star Belgrade

- Yugoslav First League: 1952–53, 1955–56, 1956–57

OFK Beograd

- Yugoslav Cup: 1961–62
