= Stinčić =

Stinčić is a surname of Croatian origin. Notable people with the name include:

- Branko Stinčić (1922–2001), Croatian footballer
- Tom Stincic (1946–2021), American football player
- Želimir Stinčić (born 1950), Croatian footballer
