= 1953–54 Yugoslav First League =

Prva savezna liga
- Season: 1953–54
- Champions: Dinamo Zagreb (2nd title)
- Relegated: Odred Ljubljana; Rabotnički
- Matches: 182
- Goals: 639 (3.51 per match)
- Top goalscorer: Stjepan Bobek (21)

The First Federal League of Yugoslavia's 1953/1954 season was the highest level football competition held in communist Yugoslavia between 1953 and 1954. The league was won by Croatian side NK Dinamo Zagreb.

== Teams ==
Due to the league's expansion from 12 to 14 teams two clubs were relegated and four teams were promoted at the end of the previous season.

Team	Location	Federal Republic	Position in 1952–53
BSK Belgrade	Belgrade	SR Serbia	5th
Dinamo Zagreb	Zagreb	SR Croatia	7th
Hajduk Split	Split	SR Croatia	2nd
Lokomotiva	Zagreb	SR Croatia	8th
Odred Ljubljana	Ljubljana	SR Slovenia	—N/a
Partizan	Belgrade	SR Serbia	3rd
Proleter Osijek	Osijek	SR Croatia	—N/a
Rabotnički	Skopje	SR Macedonia	—N/a
Radnički Belgrade	Belgrade	SR Serbia	—N/a
Red Star	Belgrade	SR Serbia	1st
Sarajevo	Sarajevo	SR Bosnia and Herzegovina	6th
Spartak Subotica	Subotica	SR Serbia	10th
Vardar	Skopje	SR Macedonia	9th
Vojvodina	Novi Sad	SR Serbia	4th

== League table ==
Pos	Team	Pld	W	D	L	GF	GA	GR	Pts	Relegation
1	Dinamo Zagreb (C)	26	19	4	3	72	22	3.273	42	
2	Partizan	26	18	5	3	77	30	2.567	41	
3	Red Star Belgrade	26	17	4	5	51	22	2.318	38	
4	Hajduk Split	26	16	3	7	55	34	1.618	35	
5	Vojvodina	26	14	5	7	60	37	1.622	33	
6	Spartak Subotica	26	12	3	11	51	50	1.020	27	
7	Sarajevo	26	10	4	12	35	45	0.778	24	
8	BSK Belgrade	26	8	7	11	38	40	0.950	23	
9	Vardar	26	5	10	11	31	38	0.816	20	
10	Proleter Osijek	26	6	8	12	34	62	0.548	20	
11	Lokomotiva	26	7	5	14	38	49	0.776	19	
12	Radnički Beograd	26	8	3	15	38	51	0.745	19	
13	Odred (R)	26	4	4	18	39	71	0.549	12	Relegation to Yugoslav Second League
14	Rabotnički (R)	26	4	3	19	20	88	0.227	11	Relegation to Yugoslav Second League

Source: rsssf.org
Rules for classification: 1st points; 2nd goal average
(C) Champions; (R) Relegated

== Results ==
Home \ Away	BSK	DIN	HAJ	LOK	ODR	PAR	PRO	RAB	RBE	RSB	SAR	SPA	VAR	VOJ
BSK Belgrade		0–3	3–4	3–2	0–1	1–1	1–1	8–1	2–0	0–3	2–1	1–1	3–1	1–2
Dinamo Zagreb	1–1		3–1	1–0	5–3	2–0	6–2	5–0	4–1	1–0	5–0	5–0	2–0	0–2
Hajduk Split	3–1	1–0		2–1	4–0	2–2	8–0	3–1	1–0	1–0	0–3	1–0	0–0	1–2
Lokomotiva	3–0	0–6	2–5		5–2	0–1	2–0	3–0	2–0	1–3	0–0	0–1	1–1	3–1
Odred	1–0	4–6	1–1	1–2		2–6	2–2	0–1	4–2	4–3	0–1	1–1	0–1	2–4
Partizan	1–2	1–0	4–2	2–0	2–0		3–3	8–0	1–1	7–1	4–1	2–1	1–0	4–2
Proleter Osijek	0–2	2–5	1–4	2–2	1–1	2–3		1–1	0–1	0–0	2–0	2–1	3–2	1–2
Rabotnički	1–0	1–5	0–2	4–3	3–2	0–8	0–2		0–3	0–4	0–1	2–7	2–2	0–1
Radnički Beograd	2–3	0–0	2–5	3–1	3–2	2–4	1–2	2–0		0–2	2–1	6–1	2–0	1–3
Red Star	1–1	0–0	2–1	3–0	5–1	0–2	3–0	3–0	1–1		3–1	2–1	1–0	1–0
Sarajevo	1–1	1–3	0–1	2–2	3–2	2–1	6–1	3–0	1–0	0–1		0–1	2–0	1–6
Spartak Subotica	2–0	1–2	2–0	2–1	3–2	2–6	2–4	4–1	4–1	0–3	6–1		0–0	4–1
Vardar	1–0	1–1	1–2	3–1	4–0	1–2	0–0	1–1	3–1	0–3	1–1	3–4		3–3
Vojvodina	2–2	0–1	3–0	1–1	3–1	1–1	4–0	7–1	4–1	0–3	1–2	3–0	2–2	

Source: DataSoccer.it
Legend: Blue = home team win; Yellow = draw; Red = away team win.

== Winning squad ==
Champions:

- Dinamo Zagreb (coach: Ivan Jazbinšek)

players (league matches/league goals):

- Ivica Banožić 3 (0)
- Aleksandar Benko 21 (13)
- Zvonimir Cimermančić 2 (0)
- Dragutin Cizarić 9 (0)
- Tomislav Crnković 20 (0)
- Željko Čajkovski 24 (13)
- Vladimir Čonč 26 (13)
- Dionizije Dvornić 26 (16)
- Emil Ferković 10 (0)
- Drago Horvat 6 (0)
- Ivica Horvat 20 (0)
- Dragutin Kukec 3 (0)
- Luka Lipošinović 10 (3)
- Vladimir Majerović 10 (0)
- Lav Mantula 21 (2)
- Stojan Osojnak 10 (9)
- Branko Režek 23 (2)
- Zvonko Strnad 1 (0)
- Josip Šikić 25 (0)

== Top scorers ==
Rank	Player	Club	Goals
1	(Socialist Federal Republic of Yugoslavia) Stjepan Bobek	Partizan	21
2	(Socialist Federal Republic of Yugoslavia) Zdravko Rajkov	Vojvodina	16
3	(Socialist Federal Republic of Yugoslavia) Dionizije Dvornić	Dinamo Zagreb	15
3	(Socialist Federal Republic of Yugoslavia) Branko Zebec	Partizan	15
5	(Socialist Federal Republic of Yugoslavia) Aleksandar Petaković	Radnički Belgrade	14
5	(Socialist Federal Republic of Yugoslavia) Miloš Milutinović	Partizan	14
5	(Socialist Federal Republic of Yugoslavia) Ivan Toplak	Odred	14
5	(Socialist Federal Republic of Yugoslavia) Aleksandar Benko	Dinamo Zagreb	14

== See also ==
- 1953–54 Yugoslav Second League
- 1953 Yugoslav Cup
