= ŠK Ferraria =

Ferraria
- Full name: Športski klub Ferraria
- Founded: November 1922
- Dissolved: 6 June 1945

ŠK Ferraria was a Croatian football club formed in Zagreb. The club was founded in November 1922, as the local ironworkers' club. Throughout its existence during the pre-war Kingdom of Yugoslavia the club played a major role in lower-tier regional competitions, before it was disbanded in June 1945 by the post-war communist authorities.

During their most successful period, from 1924 to 1930, the club won five titles playing in the Zagreb local league, under the guidance of former Građanski player and Yugoslavia international Rudolf Rupec. Several notable football figures later involved with Dinamo Zagreb started their careers at Ferraria or had managing spells at the club, including Zvonko Monsider, Ivica Horvat, and Bernard Hügl.
