= Krešo Pukšec =

Croatian footballer (1920–1990)

Personal information
- Full name: Krešimir Pukšec
- Date of birth: 2 October 1920
- Place of birth: Zagreb, Kingdom of Serbs, Croats and Slovenes
- Date of death: 26 August 1990 (aged 69)
- Place of death: Zagreb, SR Croatia, SFR Yugoslavia
- Position: Center back

Senior career*
Years	Team	Apps	(Gls)
1936–1945	Concordia Zagreb		
1945–1947	Druga Armija		
1947–1952	Dinamo Zagreb		
1952–1954	Lokomotiva Zagreb		
1954–1956	Metalac Zagreb		

International career
1941–1943	Independent State of Croatia	6	(0)
- * Club domestic league appearances and goals

Krešo Pukšec (2 October 1920 – 26 August 1990) was a Croatian footballer. He played for the Croatia national football team. His career with various clubs in Zagreb lasted two decades.

== International career ==
Pukšec made his international debut in September 1941 and played all 6 games under the flag of the Independent State of Croatia, a World War II-era puppet state of Nazi Germany. His final international was an April 1943 friendly match against Slovakia.
