= Antal Tapiška =

Yugoslav footballer and manager

Personal information
- Full name: Antal Tapiška
- Date of birth: 11 November 1919
- Place of birth: Subotica, Kingdom of Yugoslavia
- Date of death: 10 March 2016 (aged 88)
- Place of death: Subotica, Serbia
- Position: Defender

Senior career*
Years	Team	Apps	(Gls)
- Mornar Split
- Naša Krila Zemun
1946–1947	Partizan	1	(0)
1947–1960	Spartak Subotica		

Managerial career
- Vinogradar
- Zorka Subotica
- Spartak Subotica (woman)
- Spartak Subotica (youth)
- * Club domestic league appearances and goals

Antal Tapiška (Serbian Cyrillic: Антал Тапишка, Hungarian: Tapiska Antal, 11 November 1919 – 10 March 2016) was a Yugoslav football player and manager. He was known for his contributions to Yugoslav football both as a player and later as a coach.

== Club career ==
He started his playing career while serving the mandatory military conscription and affiliated in the Yugoslav Navy side Mornar Split, later moving to Yugoslav Air Force side Naša Krila Zemun. His talent took him to join the main army backed team, Partizan, in 1946. Partizan was newly formed club which gathered most of the best players of the country, so Tapiška found himself in difficulties to establish himself, despite all, he managed to make with Partizan one appearance in the 1946–47 Yugoslav First League, 4 appearances in the Yugoslav Cup, and 29 in friendlies and tournaments.

Not wanting to stay as a substitute, Tapiška decided to leave Partizan and joined Spartak Subotica where he spent the next 14 years. He became a legendary defender shirt number 2 who became fundamental in all achievements of Spartak between 1947 until 1960. He played over 500 official games in that period of time. Tapiška retired in 1960 and in his honor Spartak organised a farewell match against Dynamo Dresden.

== Coaching career ==
After finishing his playing career, he became a manager, and coached minor local teams such as Vonogradar and Zorka. He also coached the woman's section of Spartak Subotica and also the youth teams of the club. Afterwards, he became member of the direction board of management of the Subotica City Stadium.
