= Želimir Stinčić =

Croatian footballer (born 1950)

Željko Stinčić
Personal information
- Date of birth: 13 July 1950 (age 76)
- Place of birth: Zagreb, SR Croatia, FPR Yugoslavia
- Height: 1.87 m (6 ft 1 1/2 in)
- Position: Goalkeeper

Senior career*
Years	Team	Apps	(Gls)
1967–1981	Dinamo Zagreb	189	(0)
1981–1985	Austria Salzburg	91	(0)
Total		280	(0)

International career
1978	Yugoslavia	1	(0)
- * Club domestic league appearances and goals

Želimir "Željko" Stinčić (born 13 July 1950) is a Croatian retired footballer.

== Club career ==
Stinčić, son of Yugoslav international Branko Stinčić, started playing at NK Dinamo Zagreb in 1967, but had only a handful of appearances in his first six seasons with the club, acting as a second- or third-choice goalkeeper at the time when established goalkeepers Zlatko Škorić and Fahrija Dautbegović were at the club. Following Dautbegović's departure, Stinčić appeared in 21 Yugoslav First League matches in the 1973–74 season, and became a regular member of the first team squad in the following years. By 1981 he played a total of 478 games (including 190 league matches) for the Blues. At the end of the 1980–81 season he moved abroad to Austrian side SV Austria Salzburg, where he played for four seasons, appearing in 91 Austrian Bundesliga games, before retiring in 1985.

== International career ==
He was capped once for Yugoslavia, in a Euro 1980 qualifier against Spain on 4 October 1978 and conceded two goals from Juanito and Santillana in a 2–1 defeat.

After retiring he worked as a goalkeeping coach at Dinamo Zagreb until 2005, when he opened a goalkeeping academy together with Zlatko Škorić. Zlatko unfortunately got diabetes and since his finger has got cut off (because of diabetes) he wasn't able to work. After that incident Stincic was working alone.
