= Sima Milovanov =

Serbian footballer and manager (1923–2002)

Personal information
- Full name: Sima Milovanov
- Date of birth: 10 April 1923
- Place of birth: Bečej, Kingdom of Serbs, Croats, and Slovenes
- Date of death: 16 November 2002 (aged 79)
- Position: Defender

Senior career*
Years	Team	Apps	(Gls)
- Građanski Bečej
1948–1950	Sloga Novi Sad		
1951–1957	Vojvodina	139	(21)

International career
1951–1954	Yugoslavia	4	(0)

Managerial career
- Slavija Novi Sad
- Osijek
- 1965–1967: Veria
- 1970–1971: Anorthosis
- 1971–1973: Nea Salamis
- 1972: Cyprus
- * Club domestic league appearances and goals

Sima Milovanov (Serbian Cyrillic: Сима Милованов; 10 April 1923 – 16 November 2002) was a Serbian footballer who was part of Yugoslavia national football team at the 1954 FIFA World Cup. He later became a manager with Cyprus.

== International career ==
Milovanov made his debut for Yugoslavia in an August 1951 friendly match away against Norway and earned a total of 4 caps (no goals). His final international was a May 1954 friendly against England.
