= Branko Kralj =

Croatian footballer

Personal information
- Date of birth: 10 March 1924
- Place of birth: Zagreb, Kingdom of Yugoslavia
- Date of death: 18 December 2012 (aged 88)
- Place of death: Zagreb, Croatia
- Position: Goalkeeper

Youth career
- 1938–1942: Concordia Zagreb

Senior career*
Years	Team	Apps	(Gls)
1942–1945	Concordia Zagreb		
1945–1952	Borac Zagreb		
1952–1956	Dinamo Zagreb	61	(0)

International career
1954–1955	Yugoslavia	3	(0)
- * Club domestic league appearances and goals

Branko Kralj (10 March 1924 – 18 December 2012) was a Croatian footballer who played as goalkeeper. He was born and died in Zagreb.

== Club career ==
Kralj joined local side HŠK Concordia in 1938. After World War II when the club was disbanded he joined NK Borac. Borac later merged into today's NK Zagreb and Kralj moved to local powerhouse Dinamo Zagreb. During his time with Dinamo he appeared in a total of 108 matches (including 61 Yugoslav First League games) and helped the club win the 1953–54 championship title. He retired the following season after sustaining a career-ending injury during a match against Velež Mostar.

== International career ==
He was called up for Yugoslavia 39 times during his time at Dinamo, but always as a substitute for the team's first-choice goalkeeper Vladimir Beara of Hajduk Split. He eventually earned three caps for the national team, each time coming on as a substitute for Beara between 1954 and 1955, and was a member of the Yugoslav squad which reached the quarter-final in the 1954 World Cup in Switzerland. He was also part of Yugoslavia's squad at the 1952 Summer Olympics, but he did not play in any matches.

After retiring from active football he graduated from the Faculty of Economics at the University of Zagreb and worked in Dinamo's club management.
