= Gordan Irović =

Yugoslav footballer (1934–1995)

Personal information
- Date of birth: 2 July 1934
- Place of birth: Herceg Novi, Yugoslavia
- Date of death: 26 May 1995 (aged 60)
- Place of death: Munich, Germany
- Position: Goalkeeper

Senior career*
Years	Team	Apps	(Gls)
1953-1956	Velež Mostar		
1957-1963	Dinamo Zagreb	93	(0)
1963-1964	SV Phönix 03 Ludwigshafen		
1964-1965	SV Südwest Ludwigshafen		
1965	Ludwigshafener SC		
1966	FSV Oggersheim		
1966	Wacker Innsbruck	8	(0)
1966-1968	WSG Radenthein		

Managerial career
- 1972: Toronto Croatia
- * Club domestic league appearances and goals

Gordan Irović (2 July 1934 – 26 May 1995) was a Yugoslav football goalkeeper who was a member of the Yugoslavia national team at the 1958 FIFA World Cup. However, he never earned a cap for his country.

== Club career ==
With Dinamo Zagreb, Irović won the 1958 Yugoslav league title and three domestic cups in the 1960s. After a few years in Germany, he joined Austrian side Wacker Innsbruck in 1966, only to lose his place between the posts to Leo Tschenett.

== Managerial career ==
Irović was the head coach for Toronto Croatia in the National Soccer League in 1972.

== Personal life ==
=== Death ===
Nicknamed Kamikaze, due to his habit of throwing himself at attackers, he died in 1995
