= Mladen Košćak =

Croatian footballer

Personal information
- Date of birth: 16 October 1936
- Place of birth: Zagreb, Yugoslavia
- Date of death: 3 August 1997 (aged 60)
- Place of death: Zagreb, Croatia
- Position: Defender

Senior career*
Years	Team	Apps	(Gls)
1955–1963	Dinamo Zagreb	76	(0)

International career
1956	Yugoslavia	4	(0)
Medal record
Representing Yugoslavia
Men's Football
Silver medal – second place	1956 Melbourne	Team competition
- * Club domestic league appearances and goals

Mladen Košćak (also spelled Koščak; 16 October 1936 – 3 August 1997) was a Croatian and Yugoslav footballer.

== Club career ==
Born in Zagreb, Košćak joined the youth academy of local side Dinamo Zagreb, with whom he spent his entire career. He started playing at full professional level in the 1955–56 season. Košćak soon established himself as a first-team regular and was instrumental in Dinamo's 1957–58 Yugoslav First League title. Although he was considered a huge talent, his career was hampered by a serious injury and he effectively stopped playing by 1960, appearing in only a single match in his last three years with the club before retiring in 1963.

== International career ==
Internationally, he was capped 4 times for the Yugoslavia national football team and was member of the national squad which won the silver medal at the 1956 Summer Olympics in Melbourne. His final international was a December 1956 friendly against Indonesia.
