= Drago Hmelina =

Croatian footballer

Personal information
- Full name: Drago Hmelina
- Date of birth: 1932
- Place of birth: Zagreb, Kingdom of Yugoslavia
- Date of death: 2004 (aged 71–72)
- Place of death: Zagreb, Croatia
- Positions: Forward; left winger

Senior career*
Years	Team	Apps	(Gls)
–1950	Metalac Zagreb		
1950–1952	Lokomotiva Zagreb		
1954–1956	Partizan	8	(3)
1956–1958	Lokomotiva Zagreb		
1958–1959	Dinamo Zagreb	8	(1)
1959–1960	Čelik Zenica		
1960–1961	FK Sarajevo		
1961–1963	Lokomotiva Zagreb		
- * Club domestic league appearances and goals

Drago Hmelina (1932–2004) was a Croatian footballer.

== Club career ==
Nicknamed "Beli", Hmelina started playing in Metalac Zagreb and in 1950 he signed with NK Lokomotiva Zagreb where he played until his military service, in 1952. Afterward, he plays with Belgrade's FK Partizan between 1954 and 1956 before returning in 1957 to Lokomotiva. In 1958 he moves to the great NK Dinamo Zagreb and after a year he moves to NK Čelik Zenica following a season with FK Sarajevo, in 1960. He will end up his career playing again with Lokomotiva between 1961 and 1963. He usually played as a left winger and was known for his good technical skills and as an excellent dribbler.
