= Branko Stinčić =

Croatian footballer (1922–2001)

Personal information
- Date of birth: 17 December 1922
- Place of birth: Zagreb, Kingdom of Serbs, Croats and Slovenes
- Date of death: 12 October 2001 (aged 78)
- Place of death: Zagreb, Croatia
- Position: Goalkeeper

Youth career
- Trešnjevka

Senior career*
| Years | Team | Apps | (Gls) |
| 1946–1948 | Hajduk Split | 33 | (0) |
| 1950–1953 | Dinamo Zagreb | 47 | (0) |
| 1953–1955 | Lokomotiva Zagreb | 37 | (0) |
| Total | | 117 | (0) |

International career
| 1951 | Yugoslavia | 1 | (0) |
- * Club domestic league appearances and goals

Branko Stinčić (17 December 1922 – 12 October 2001) was a Croatian football player.

== Career ==
Born in Zagreb, Stinčić played for both Croatian derby sides in his career, first for Hajduk Split from 1946 to 1948 and then for Dinamo Zagreb from 1950 to 1953. With Dinamo he won the Yugoslav Cup in 1951.

He was capped once for Yugoslavia, in a friendly game against Norway on 23 August 1951, coming on as a substitute for Vladimir Beara in the 46th minute.

== Personal life ==
He was father of Željko Stinčić, also a goalkeeper, who played for Dinamo Zagreb from 1967 to 1981, and who was also capped for Yugoslavia once in 1978.
