= Božidar Senčar =

Croatian footballer

Personal information
- Date of birth: 28 September 1927
- Place of birth: Zagreb, Kingdom of Serbs, Croats and Slovenes
- Date of death: 27 June 1985 (aged 57)
- Place of death: Luxembourg
- Position: Midfielder

Youth career
- Concordia Zagreb

Senior career*
Years	Team	Apps	(Gls)
1945–1947	Dinamo Zagreb	24	(11)
1947–1950	Partizan	23	(7)
1951–1952	Dinamo Zagreb	32	(18)
1952–1954	Hajduk Split	23	(8)
1954–1955	NK Zagreb	11	(3)
1956–1957	Bayern Munich	11	(4)
1957–1958	NAC	3	(0)

International career
1949–1951	Yugoslavia	3	(1)
- * Club domestic league appearances and goals

Božidar Senčar (1927–1985) was a Croatian football midfielder who started playing for his hometown club Dinamo Zagreb in Yugoslav First League in 1946.

== Club career ==
After spending a season and a half with Dinamo he was picked up by Partizan during the 1947–48 season where he spent the following three seasons, helping them win the Yugoslav championship in 1949. In 1950, he returned to Dinamo and won the Yugoslav Cup in 1951. In 1952, he left Dinamo again, this time to join their biggest Croatian rivals, Hajduk Split, with whom he reached the Yugoslav Cup final in 1953 (which Hajduk lost to BSK Belgrade 2–0). After two seasons at Hajduk, Senčar returned to Zagreb and joined NK Zagreb where he played a single season before joining German giants Bayern Munich for the 1956–57 season. His last stop was at NAC Breda where he had only three appearances in the last season of his professional career, before retiring in 1958.

== International career ==
Senčar made his debut for Yugoslavia in a 1950 World Cup qualifier against Israel on 21 August 1949 in Belgrade which Yugoslavia won 6–0. Senčar scored his only international goal in the 44th minute after a hat-trick by Miloš Pajević. He later appeared at the away game against Israel in September 1949, but was subsequently dropped from the squad led by Milorad Arsenijević to the 1950 World Cup. After the World Cup, he earned one more cap in a friendly against Italy in May 1951.

== Honours ==
- Yugoslav First League
  - Winner (1): 1948–49 (with Partizan)
- Yugoslav Cup
  - Winner (1): 1951 (with Dinamo Zagreb)
  - Runner-up (1): 1953 (with Hajduk Split)
