= Vladimir Čonč =

Croatian footballer (1928–2012)

Personal information
- Date of birth: 13 January 1928
- Place of birth: Zagreb, Kingdom of Serbs, Croats and Slovenes
- Date of death: 15 October 2012 (aged 84)
- Place of death: Zagreb, Croatia
- Position: Midfielder

Youth career
- Građanski Zagreb
- Poštar Zagreb

Senior career*
Years	Team	Apps	(Gls)
1946–1949	Lokomotiva	36	(5)
1950	Naša Krila Zemun	13	(0)
1951–1952	Lokomotiva	48	(8)
1953–1961	Dinamo Zagreb	173	(43)
1961–1962	Kickers Offenbach	24	(5)
1962–1963	Eintracht Bad Kreuznach	28	(3)
1963–1966	Opel Rüsselsheim		

International career
1956	Yugoslavia	1	(0)
Medal record
Representing Yugoslavia
Men's Football
Silver medal – second place	1952 Helsinki	Team
- * Club domestic league appearances and goals

Vladimir Čonč (13 January 1928 – 15 October 2012) was a Croatian and Yugoslav footballer.

== Club career ==
He played for several clubs from Zagreb, including Građanski, NK Poštar and Lokomotiva, but is best remembered for his eight-year spell with Dinamo Zagreb where he played from 1953 to 1961. He appeared in a total of 413 games and scored 119 goals for the Blues (including 173 appearances and 43 goals in the Yugoslav First League). After leaving Dinamo in 1961 he spent several seasons with German lower level sides Kickers Offenbach, Eintracht Bad Kreuznach and Opel Rüsselsheim before retiring in 1966.

== International career ==
Čonč was also member of the Yugoslavia squad which won silver medal at the 1952 Summer Olympics, and was capped once for Yugoslavia in a friendly against England held at Wembley on 28 November 1956.

== Honours ==
- First Federal League (2): 1953–54, 1957–58
- Marshal Tito Cup (1): 1960
