= Bernard Hügl =

Yugoslav footballer and manager

Personal information
- Date of birth: 27 March 1908
- Place of birth: Berauersheim, Kingdom of Hungary, Austria-Hungary
- Date of death: 2 April 1982 (aged 74)
- Place of death: Heilbronn, West Germany
- Position: Defender

Youth career
- Vrbaški ŠK

Senior career*
Years	Team	Apps	(Gls)
1931–1940	Građanski Zagreb	142	(8)

International career
1934–1939	Yugoslavia	24	(0)

Managerial career
- 1948: Ličanin Zagreb
- 1949: Ferraria Zagreb
- 1949–1952: Dinamo Zagreb
- 1953–1955: Velež Mostar
- 1953–1954: Yugoslavia B
- 1955–1956: Proleter Osijek
- 1958–1960: Stuttgarter Kickers
- 1960–1963: VfR Heilbronn
- * Club domestic league appearances and goals

Bernard "Benda" Hügl (27 March 1908 – 2 April 1982; also spelled Higl in some sources) was a Croatian and Yugoslav football manager and player who played for Yugoslavia.

== Playing career ==
=== Club ===
He started his career playing with Vrbaški ŠK from where he transferred to Yugoslav giants Građanski Zagreb where he would spend the rest of his career.

=== International ===
On the national level, Hügl made his debut for Yugoslavia a March 1934 friendly match away against Bulgaria and earned a total of 24 caps (no 3 goals). His final international was another friendly, in February 1939 in Berlin against Nazi Germany.

== Managerial career ==
He managed Ličanin Zagreb, Ferraria, Dinamo Zagreb, Velež Mostar, Proleter Osijek, Yugoslavia B, Stuttgarter Kickers and Heilbronn.

== Honours ==
=== Manager ===
Dinamo Zagreb

- Yugoslav Cup: 1951

Velež Mostar

- Yugoslav Second League: 1954–55

Stuttgarter Kickers

- 2. Oberliga Süd: 1958–59
