= Zvonko Strnad =

Croatian footballer

Personal information
- Full name: Zvonko Strnad
- Date of birth: 15 January 1926
- Place of birth: Zagreb, Kingdom of Serbs, Croats and Slovenes (now Croatia)
- Date of death: 1979 (aged 52–53)
- Place of death: Zagreb, SR Croatia, Yugoslavia
- Position: Right winger

Senior career*
Years	Team	Apps	(Gls)
1943–1945	Zagorec Krapina		
1945–1946	Metalac Zagreb		
1946–1948	Dinamo Zagreb	9	(3)
1948–1950	Partizan	18	(3)
1950–1954	Dinamo Zagreb	30	(4)
- * Club domestic league appearances and goals

Zvonko "Tiba" Strnad (1926–1979) was a Croatian footballer.

== Career ==
Zvonko played for various clubs from his hometown, Zagreb, namely, Zagorec and Metalac, before coming in 1946 to the city's main club, NK Dinamo Zagreb, where he played until 1954 with only a brief interruption, playing 111 league matches and scoring 23 goals. The exceptions were the 1948–49 and 1949–50 season in which he moved to Belgrade and played in FK Partizan where he won the national Championship in the 1948–49 season. He played two matches for the B Yugoslavia national team.

He was known as a fast right winger, with excellent dribbling skills and great crossing passes.

His career was prematurely ended by a meniscus injury.
