= Ivan Šantek =

Croatian footballer

Personal information
- Date of birth: 23 April 1932
- Place of birth: Zagreb, Kingdom of Yugoslavia
- Date of death: 14 April 2015 (aged 82)
- Position: Defender

Senior career*
Years	Team	Apps	(Gls)
1952–1957	NK Zagreb	116	(6)
1957–1963	Dinamo Zagreb	83	(3)
1963–1966	Wacker Innsbruck	38+	(5+)
1967–1969	SV Wattens	25+	(0+)

International career
1956–1958	Yugoslavia	6	(0)
Medal record
Men's Football
Representing Yugoslavia
Olympic Games
Silver medal – second place	1956 Melbourne	Team
- * Club domestic league appearances and goals

Ivan Šantek (23 April 1932 – 14 April 2015) was a Croatian and Yugoslav football player. He was born in Zagreb.

== International career ==
Šantek made his debut for Yugoslavia in a November 1956 Summer Olympics match against the United States and earned a total of 6 caps, scoring no goals. He was a participant at the 1956 Summer Olympics and the 1958 FIFA World Cup. His final international was a September 1958 friendly match away against Austria.
