= Željko Matuš =

Croatian footballer (1935–2026)

Personal information
- Date of birth: 9 August 1935
- Place of birth: Donja Stubica, Kingdom of Yugoslavia
- Date of death: 7 November 2026 (aged 91)
- Place of death: Zurich, Switzerland
- Positions: Defender; forward

Youth career
- Stubica
- Zagorec Krapina
- Orotex Orosavlje

Senior career*
Years	Team	Apps	(Gls)
1955–1965	Dinamo Zagreb	190	(54)
1965–1969	Young Fellows Zürich		(10+)
1969–1970	FC Zürich	12	(0)

International career
1956	PR Croatia	1	(1)
1960–1962	Yugoslavia	13	(5)
Medal record
Men's Football
Representing Yugoslavia
Olympic Games
Gold medal – first place	1960 Rome	Team
European Championship
Silver medal – second place	1960 France	Team
- * Club domestic league appearances and goals

Željko Matuš (9 August 1935 – 7 November 2026) was a Yugoslavian and Croatian footballer, dentist. He was part of the Yugoslav squad that won gold at the 1960 Summer Olympics.

During his club career he played for Dinamo Zagreb, Young Fellows Zürich and FC Zürich.

== Club career ==
Matuš was born in 1935 in Donja Stubica. He started career in Tekstilac from Oroslavje.

He came to Dinamo Zagreb in 1954, with whom he won championship (1958) and three cup titles (1960, 1963, 1965). He was club captain in the season of 1962/63, in which Dinamo played finals of the Inter-Cities Fairs Cup. On the road to the final, Dinamo defeated Porto, Bayern and Ferencváros, but eventually lost to Valencia in the final match.

== International career ==
Matuš earned 13 caps for the Yugoslavia national team, and took part in the 1960 European Nations' Cup and the 1962 FIFA World Cup. He also played a friendly match for the PR Croatia national team against Indonesia in 1956, in which he scored a goal. His final international was a September 1962 friendly match against West Germany.

== Later life and death ==
After retired from football career, he worked as a dentist in Switzerland. Following the death of Viktor Ponedelnik in December 2020, Matuš became the last living participant of the 1960 European Nations' Cup Final. Matuš died in 7 November 2026, at the age of 91.
