= Lav Mantula =

Yugoslav footballer (1928–2008)

Personal information
- Date of birth: 8 December 1928
- Place of birth: Sarajevo, Kingdom of Yugoslavia
- Date of death: 1 December 2008 (aged 79)
- Place of death: Zürich, Switzerland
- Position: Midfielder

Senior career*
Years	Team	Apps	(Gls)
1947–1951	FK Sarajevo	49	(4)
1952–1955	Dinamo Zagreb	54	(4)
1955–1958	NK Zagreb	32	(8)
1959–1962	Servette		
1962–1966	Sion		

International career
1954	Yugoslavia	1	(0)

Managerial career
- 1963–1967: Sion
- 1967–1969: Zürich
- 1972–1975: Neuchâtel Xamax
- 1979–1980: Neuchâtel Xamax
- * Club domestic league appearances and goals

Lav Mantula (8 December 1928 – 1 December 2008) was a Yugoslav footballer who played as a midfielder. He represented Yugoslavia at the 1954 FIFA World Cup.

== Club career ==
Mantula played club football in Yugoslavia with FK Sarajevo, Dinamo Zagreb and NK Zagreb and in Switzerland with Servette and Sion.

== International career ==
Mantula made his debut and played his only game for Yugoslavia in a September 1954 friendly match away against Wales.

== Managerial career ==
Mantula also coached in Switzerland, managing the club sides Sion, Zürich and Neuchâtel Xamax.
