= Luka Lipošinović =

Croatian footballer

Personal information
- Date of birth: 12 May 1933
- Place of birth: Subotica, Kingdom of Yugoslavia
- Date of death: 26 September 1992 (aged 59)
- Positions: Striker; right winger

Senior career*
Years	Team	Apps	(Gls)
1951–1962	Dinamo Zagreb	178	(47)
1962–1969	LASK	151	(31)

International career
1954–1960	Yugoslavia	13	(3)

Managerial career
- 1971–1972: LASK
Medal record
Men's Football
Representing Yugoslavia
Olympic Games
Silver medal – second place	1956 Melbourne	Team
- * Club domestic league appearances and goals

Luka Lipošinović (Serbian Cyrillic: Лука Липошиновић; 12 May 1933 – 26 September 1992) was a Yugoslavian (ethnic Croat from Vojvodina) football player. He earned 13 caps for Yugoslavia.

== Club career ==
With the Croatian club Dinamo from Zagreb Lipošinović took two Yugoslav championships (1953–54 and 1957–58) and one Yugoslav cup (1960).

In 1965 Lipošinović joined the Austrian champion club LASK from Linz. He played one season, ending on 7th position. Several years later, he coached LASK Linz.

== International career ==
As national team player, Lipošinović participated in the 1956 Olympics, winning silver medal, and the 1958 FIFA World Cup. He made his debut for Yugoslavia in a September 1954 friendly match away against Saarland and earned a total of 13 caps, scoring 3 goals. His final international was a May 1960 friendly away against England.
