= Dražan Jerković =

Croatian footballer (1936–2008)

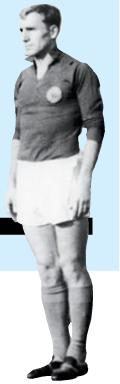
- Jerković with Yugoslavia at the 1962 FIFA World Cup

Personal information
- Date of birth: 6 August 1936
- Place of birth: Šibenik, Kingdom of Yugoslavia (now Croatia)
- Date of death: 9 December 2008 (aged 72)
- Place of death: Zagreb, Croatia
- Height: 1.86 m (6 ft 1 in)
- Position: Forward

Senior career*
Years	Team	Apps	(Gls)
1954–1965	Dinamo Zagreb	142	(96)
1965–1966	AA Gent	3	(1)
Total		145	(97)

International career
1956	PR Croatia	1	(0)
1960–1964	Yugoslavia	21	(11)

Managerial career
- 1971–1972: Dinamo Zagreb
- 1973–1974: Austria Klagenfurt
- 1974–1975: Villacher SV
- 1975–1976: Dinamo Vinkovci
- 1976–1982: NK Zagreb
- 1978: Yugoslavia
- 1990–1992: Croatia
Medal record
Men's football
Representing Yugoslavia
European Championship
Silver medal – second place	1960 France	Team
Gold medal – first place	1971 İzmir	as coach
- * Club domestic league appearances and goals

Dražan Jerković (Croatian pronunciation: [drǎʒan jěːrkoʋitɕ]; 6 August 1936 – 9 December 2008) was a Yugoslav and Croatian professional football manager and player. A forward, his professional playing career spanned from 1954 to 1966, during which he played for Dinamo Zagreb and AA La Gantoise.

His first name is sometimes (incorrectly) spelled "Dražen". He was born in Šibenik, at the time in the Kingdom of Yugoslavia.

== Club career ==
Jerković played for Dinamo Zagreb (1954–65). Severe injuries forced him to retire early, at the height of his career. With Dinamo he won the league title in 1958, and league cup in 1960 and 1965. In 315 games for Dinamo, he scored 300 goals.

== International career ==
Jerković played internationally for Yugoslavia between 1960 and 1964, scoring 11 goals in 21 games. He participated in the 1960 European Championship and the 1962 FIFA World Cup. He was also part of the Yugoslav squad for the 1958 FIFA World Cup, but did not play.

In UEFA Euro 1960, he scored two goals against France in the semifinal, which Yugoslavia won (5–4). In the final, Yugoslavia lost against USSR (2–1; AET), finishing second.

In the 1962 FIFA World Cup, Jerković scored four goals and was, with five other players, the top goalscorer, winning the World Cup Golden Boot. Yugoslavia finished in fourth place. In the quarter-final, Yugoslavia beat Germany, while in the semifinal they lost to Czechoslovakia (3–1) and lost to Chile in the third place match (1–0).

Jerković played in a single international match with Croatia, as the Croatia national team was assembled in communist Yugoslavia once for a friendly against Indonesia in 1956. His final international was a September 1964 friendly match against Austria.

== Managerial career ==
Dražan Jerković was also the first manager of the Croatia national team since independence, between 1990 and 1992. He died on 6 December 2008 in Zagreb.

== Career statistics ==
=== Club ===
Appearances and goals by club, season and competition
Club	Season	League		
Club	Season	Division	Apps	Goals
Dinamo Zagreb	1954–55	Yugoslav First League	1	0
Dinamo Zagreb	1955–56	Yugoslav First League	12	9
Dinamo Zagreb	1956–57	Yugoslav First League	15	9
Dinamo Zagreb	1957–58	Yugoslav First League	22	17
Dinamo Zagreb	1958–59	Yugoslav First League	14	7
Dinamo Zagreb	1959–60	Yugoslav First League	16	16
Dinamo Zagreb	1960–61	Yugoslav First League	8	5
Dinamo Zagreb	1961–62	Yugoslav First League	19	16
Dinamo Zagreb	1962–63	Yugoslav First League	14	12
Dinamo Zagreb	1963–64	Yugoslav First League	4	0
Dinamo Zagreb	1964–65	Yugoslav First League	17	5
Dinamo Zagreb	Total		142	96
La Gantoise	1965–66	Belgian First Division	3	1
Career total			145	97

=== International ===
Appearances and goals by national team and year
National team	Year	Apps	Goals
Croatia	1956	1	0
Total		1	0
Yugoslavia	1960	3	2
Yugoslavia	1961	5	3
Yugoslavia	1962	11	5
Yugoslavia	1963	0	0
Yugoslavia	1964	2	1
Total		21	11
