= Ivica Horvat =

Croatian footballer

Personal information
- Full name: Ivan Horvat
- Date of birth: 16 July 1926
- Place of birth: Sisak, Kingdom of Serbs, Croats and Slovenes (now Croatia)
- Date of death: 27 August 2012 (aged 86)
- Place of death: Njivice near Omišalj, Croatia
- Height: 1.89 m (6 ft 2 in)
- Position: Centre-back

Youth career
- 1940–1945: Ferraria Zagreb

Senior career*
Years	Team	Apps	(Gls)
1945–1957	Dinamo Zagreb	230	(2)
1957–1959	Eintracht Frankfurt	56	(0)
Total		286	(2)

International career
1946–1956	Yugoslavia	60	(0)

Managerial career
- 1961–1964: Eintracht Frankfurt (assistant)
- 1964–1965: Eintracht Frankfurt
- 1967–1968: Dinamo Zagreb
- 1970: PAOK
- 1971–1975: Schalke 04
- 1975–1976: Rot-Weiss Essen
- 1978–1979: Schalke 04
Medal record
Men's football
Representing Yugoslavia
Olympic Games
Silver medal – second place	1952 Helsinki	Team
- * Club domestic league appearances and goals

Ivan "Ivica" Horvat (16 July 1926 – 27 August 2012) was a Croatian and Yugoslav professional football player and manager.

He spent most of his playing career in the 1940s and 1950s with Dinamo Zagreb, with whom he won two Federal League championships of Yugoslavia and one Marshal Tito Cup. Regarded as one of the best defenders in the country at the time, Horvat also earned 60 international caps for Yugoslavia, and was part of the national squad at the 1950 and 1954 World Cups, as well as the 1952 Olympics in Helsinki, where they were silver medalists.

In 1957 he went abroad to join Eintracht Frankfurt, helping them win their first and only West German championship in 1959 before retiring from active football. He spent the next two decades working in club management, notably leading Dinamo Zagreb to their historic 1966–67 Inter-Cities Fairs Cup win, and also winning the 1972 DFB-Pokal with Schalke 04, the German club's first domestic trophy after a 14-year drought.

== Playing career ==
=== Club ===
Horvat played from 1945 until 1957 for Dinamo Zagreb. In his last season with Dinamo he also appeared in three matches for Zagreb XI in the Inter-Cities Fairs Cup in 1956–57.

In 1957 he moved to West Germany, to join Eintracht Frankfurt, where he stayed for two seasons. In his first season, under coach Adolf Patek, Eintracht finished third in the regional 1957–58 Oberliga Süd. In the following year, this time under Paul Oßwald, the club won the 1958–59 Oberliga title and went on to win the 1959 German football championship playoff, although Horvat did not play in the historic final in Berlin, which pitched Eintracht against Kickers Offenbach coached by Horvat's former manager at Dinamo Bogdan Cuvaj.

=== International ===
In the Yugoslavia national team Horvat appeared from 1946 until 1956 in 60 fixtures. He took part in the World Cup in 1950 and 1954.

He also played with the Yugoslav team at the 1952 Summer Olympics in Helsinki and won the silver medal. In the final, Yugoslavia lost to the rising star of the 1950s, Hungary.

In the quarterfinals of the 1954 World Cup the Plavi lost due to an own goal from Horvat with 0–1. This goal was scored in the 10th minute and remained the fastest own goal in World Cup history until 2006 the Paraguayan Carlos Gamarra hit between his own posts against England after three minutes.

His final international was a November 1956 friendly match away against England.

== Managerial career ==
From 1961 until 1979 Horvat worked as manager, in the beginning as assistant at Eintracht Frankfurt and became successor of the manager legend Paul Oßwald in 1964. But Frankfurt could not convince in the Bundesliga and Horvat was sacked in 1965. He was succeeded by Elek Schwartz.

With Dinamo Zagreb he won the Inter-Cities Fairs Cup, the predecessor of the UEFA Cup, in 1967 in the final matches against Leeds United (2–0, 0–0) after previous manager Branko Zebec left club.

From 1971 he worked in the Bundesliga again, this time for FC Schalke 04, winning the DFB-Pokal in 1972 and becoming runner-up in the league. In 1975 Horvat moved to Rot-Weiss Essen, he stayed there until September 1976.

In the beginning of the 1978–1979 Horvat returned to Schalke but due to the team's bad performances and an embarrassing derby loss against Bochum he was fired in March. Thereupon Horvat finished his managing career.

== Later life ==
In 2004 he received the Croatian Olympic Committee's Matija Ljubek Award.

Horvat died on 27 August 2012, aged 86, while on vacation at his family's holiday home in Njivice on the island of Krk.

== Honours ==
=== Player ===
Dinamo Zagreb

- Yugoslav league championship – Winner: 1947–48, 1953–54; runner-up: 1946–47, 1951
- Marshal Tito Cup – Winner: 1951; runner-up: 1950

Eintracht Frankfurt

- West German championship – Winner: 1959

Yugoslavia

- 1946 Balkan Cup: Runner-up
- 1950 FIFA World Cup: 5th place
- 1952 Summer Olympics: Silver medal
- 1954 FIFA World Cup: 8th place

=== Manager ===
Dinamo Zagreb

- Inter-Cities Fairs Cup: 1966–67

Schalke 04

- DFB-Pokal: 1971–72
