= Dionizije Dvornić =

Croatian footballer

Personal information
- Full name: Dionizije Dvornić
- Date of birth: 27 April 1926
- Place of birth: Popovac, Kingdom of SCS
- Date of death: 30 October 1992 (aged 66)
- Place of death: Vevey, Switzerland
- Position: Forward

Youth career
- 1943–1945: Olimpija Osijek

Senior career*
Years	Team	Apps	(Gls)
1947–1949	Proleter Osijek		
1950–1955	Dinamo Zagreb	117	(47)
1955–1959	NK Zagreb	53	(17)
1959–1961	Lausanne-Sport		
1961–1965	Vevey		

International career
1953–1954	Yugoslavia	6	(1)
- * Club domestic league appearances and goals

Dionizije Dvornić (27 April 1926 – 30 October 1992) was a Croatian football striker who achieved greatest success playing for Dinamo Zagreb in Yugoslav First League in the 1950s.

During his time with Dinamo, he won one Yugoslav Cup in 1951 and a Yugoslav First League title in 1954. He made a total of 304 appearances and scored 161 goals for Dinamo, 47 of which were in league games.

== Club career ==
Before joining Dinamo, he played for NK Udarnik (which was renamed NK Proleter in 1947 and later merged with today's NK Osijek) and FK Dinamo Pančevo. After leaving Dinamo he spent four years at NK Zagreb before going abroad and ending his career in Switzerland.

== International career ==
Dvornić made his debut for Yugoslavia in a friendly game against France on 18 October 1953 in Zagreb, and went on to earn 6 caps, scoring one goal for the national squad. He also competed for Yugoslavia at the 1954 FIFA World Cup, when Yugoslavia made it to the quarterfinals only to be knocked out by Germany. His final international was a September 1954 friendly match against Saarland.

== Honours ==
- Yugoslav First League
  - Winner (1): 1953–54
  - Runner-up (1): 1951
- Yugoslav Cup
  - Winner (1): 1951
  - Runner-up (1): 1950
