= Željko Čajkovski =

Croatian footballer (1925–2016)

Personal information
- Date of birth: 5 May 1925
- Place of birth: Zagreb, Kingdom of Serbs, Croats and Slovenes
- Date of death: 11 November 2016 (aged 91)
- Place of death: Munich, Germany
- Height: 1.78 m (5 ft 10 in)
- Positions: Striker; left winger

Youth career
- 1938–1942: HAŠK

Senior career*
Years	Team	Apps	(Gls)
1942–1945	HAŠK		
1946–1956	Dinamo Zagreb	194	(78)
1956–1958	Werder Bremen	33	(12)
1958–1960	1. FC Lichtenfels (p/m)		

International career
1947–1951	Yugoslavia	19	(12)

Managerial career
- 1964–1966: SpVgg Fürth
- 1967–1969: Borussia Neunkirchen
- 1971–1974: SSV Ulm
- 1974: VfR Heilbronn
- 1975: Wacker 04 Berlin
Medal record
Men's Football
Representing Yugoslavia
Olympic Games
Silver medal – second place	1948 London	Team
- * Club domestic league appearances and goals

Željko Čajkovski (5 May 1925 – 11 November 2016) was a Croatian and Yugoslav football player and coach, who played as a forward. A prolific goalscorer, Čajkovski spent most of his career with his hometown club Dinamo Zagreb in the 1940s and 1950s, helping them win two championships of Yugoslavia and one Yugoslav cup.

During this period he also scored 12 goals in 19 appearances for the national team, with whom he won the silver medal at the 1948 Olympic tournament in London and played at the 1950 FIFA World Cup in Brazil. After leaving Dinamo, he spent two more seasons at the German club Werder Bremen before retiring. His older brother Zlatko was also a successful footballer during the same period, most notably with Dinamo rivals Partizan, and a Yugoslavia international.

== Playing career ==
=== Club ===
At club level he played from 1942 to 1945 for HAŠK Zagreb and, after the dissolution of the club, from 1945 onward for Dinamo Zagreb. With Dinamo he won the championship titles of 1950 and 1954 as well as the 1951 cup tournament. In 1956 he joined the German first division club Werder Bremen for two seasons. According to some sources he was amongst the ranks of 1. FC Nürnberg in the 1958–59 season. In the 1959–60 season, he served as player-manager of the northern Bavarian third division side 1. FC Lichtenfels, which he led to the Bavarian amateur championship.

=== International ===
With the Yugoslavia national team he won the silver medal in the football tournament of the 1948 Olympics held in London, losing in the final 1–3 to Sweden, then starring the young Gre-No-Li attacking trio of Gunnar Nordahl, Gunnar Gren, and Nils Liedholm.

He also played in two games for Yugoslavia in 1947 and 1948 for the regional Balkan Cup tournament.

In the 1950 World Cup qualifiers Yugoslavia was tied with France and had to play a playoff on neutral grounds in December 1949. In that game, played in Florence, the score was 2–2 after regular time. Čajkovski dramatically scored the winning goal in the 24th minute of extra time for Yugoslavia's 3–2 win, booking Yugoslavia's spot at the tournament and knocking out France, captained by Jean Baratte and managed by Gaston Barreau.

Together with his brother Zlatko he was in the side that won its 1950 FIFA World Cup matches against Switzerland and Mexico, to which he contributed a goal. A 0–2 defeat against hosts and eventual runners up Brazil, however, put an end to the Yugoslav campaign. He earned a total of 19 caps, scoring 12 goals and his final international was a June 1951 friendly match against Switzerland.

== Managerial career ==
Later he served as a coach for the German second division clubs SpVgg Fürth and Borussia Neunkirchen. He led Borussia into the Bundesliga, however he had to face relegation after one season. From 1971 he was at the helm of the third division club SSV Ulm 1846, winning the division two times, albeit failing to achieve promotion. In the first half of the 1974–75 season, he managed VfR Heilbronn, and in the second half, Wacker 04 Berlin, both in the second division.

== Death ==
Čajkovski died in Munich, in November 2016, aged 91. He was reputed to be the oldest living Dinamo player at the time of his death, after Stojan Osojnak had died in October of the same year.
