= Aleksandar Benko =

Croatian footballer (1925–1991)

Personal information
- Full name: Aleksandar Benko
- Date of birth: 16 February 1925
- Place of birth: Čakovec, Kingdom of Serbs, Croats and Slovenes
- Date of death: 26 May 1991 (aged 66)
- Place of death: St. Gallen, Switzerland
- Position: Striker

Youth career
- 1943: NK Čakovec

Senior career*
Years	Team	Apps	(Gls)
1947–1958	Dinamo Zagreb	159	(68)
1958–1959	Grasshoppers		
1959–1960	Lugano		
1961–1963	Wohlen		
1963–1967	St Gallen		

International career
1949	Yugoslavia	1	(0)
1956	Croatia	1	(1)
- * Club domestic league appearances and goals

Aleksandar Benko (16 February 1925 – 26 May 1991) was a Croatian footballer who played one game internationally for both the Yugoslavia and Croatia national teams.

== CLub career ==
A striker, he began his career with NK Čakovec in 1943, and in 1947 moved to Dinamo Zagreb with whom he won the Yugoslav Federal League in 1948, 1954 and 1958. In 1958 he moved to Switzerland where he played for Grasshopper (1958–59), Lugano (1959–60), Wohlen (1961–63) and St. Gallen (1963–67). There he remained for the rest of his life. He is buried in Zagreb's Mirogoj cemetery.

== International career ==
He played for the Croatia national team in a friendly against Indonesia in Zagreb in 1956 and served as the team's captain. He also played for the Yugoslavia national team in a 1949 match against France.
