= Tomislav Crnković (footballer) =

Croatian footballer

Personal information
- Full name: Tomislav Crnković
- Date of birth: 17 June 1929
- Place of birth: Kotor, Kingdom of Serbs, Croats and Slovenes
- Date of death: 17 January 2009 (aged 79)
- Place of death: Zagreb, Croatia
- Position: Defender

Youth career
- HAŠK

Senior career*
Years	Team	Apps	(Gls)
1947–1949	Metalac Zagreb		
1950–1961	Dinamo Zagreb	439	(5)
1961–1962	LASK	32	(0)
1962–1964	Servette		

International career
1952–1960	Yugoslavia	51	(0)

Managerial career
- 1965–1966: 1. Simmeringer SC
Medal record
Men's Football
Representing Yugoslavia
Olympic Games
Silver medal – second place	1952 Helsinki	Team
European Championship
Silver medal – second place	1960 France	Team
- * Club domestic league appearances and goals

Tomislav Crnković (17 June 1929 – 17 January 2009) was a Croatian and Yugoslav footballer. He was born in Kotor in present-day Montenegro.

== Playing career ==
=== Club ===
As a defender, he played for HAŠK, Metalac and Dinamo Zagreb. Abroad, he later played at Linzer ASK in Austria and Servette Geneva in Switzerland.

With his 439 caps at Dinamo, Crnković was part of their Yugoslav First League-winning club in 1954 and 1958 as well as their Yugoslav Cup – winning team in 1951 and 1960. Crnković is regarded to be one of Dinamo's greatest defenders of all time. In 2006, he was also the founder of the Croatian Football Federation.

=== International ===
He made his debut for Yugoslavia in a June 1952 friendly match against Norway and earned a total of 51 caps, scoring no goals. He was part of the team that won silver at the 1952 Olympics, and was also a member of Yugoslavia's 1954 and 1958 FIFA World Cup squads. His final international was a May 1960 European Nations' Cup qualifying match away against Portugal.

== Managerial career ==
He also coached Austrian side Simmering.

== Personal life ==
Crnković was a well-known womanizer, and was married at least five times in his life. After his football career ended, Crnković spent a brief time as a journalist and later the owner of a popular restaurant in Zagreb. He also found himself in financial trouble after being involved in a car accident where he was injured. He insisted to pay money to the other victims of the accident as well which left him nearly bankrupt. Near the end of his life, he was provided for by the Croatian Football Federation.
