= Derby of Serbia =

Association football rivalry in Serbia

- Location: Serbia
- Teams: Red star or Partizan; Vojvodina

Statistics
- Most wins: Red Star
- Largest victory: Vojvodina 0-5 Red Star (1. May 2019); Vojvodina 0-4 Partizan (2. November 2019)

Derby of Serbia (Serbian: Derbi Srbije; Дерби Србије) refers to any match between professional Serbian clubs Red star Belgrade or Partizan Belgrade from Belgrade and Vojvodina from Novi Sad. A Serbian derby match must involve Vojvodina and either one of the Belgrade clubs; matches between Partizan and Red star are referred to as the Eternal Derby. One of the main reasons for the rivalry is the fact that Vojvodina, Red Star, and Partizan are the three most successful clubs in Serbia and the three most successful Serbian clubs in former Yugoslavia. Belgrade and Novi Sad are also the two largest cities in the country, so the derby is viewed as a manifestation of the rivalry between the two cities. They were also the only three Serbian clubs to win the Yugoslav championship, and all three clubs are in the Top 5 of the Yugoslav First League all-time table, with Red Star Belgrade at 1st, Partizan Belgrade at 2nd, and Vojvodina Novi Sad at 5th.

In the last few years, Vojvodina have become a serious competitor with the two Belgrade clubs for the Serbian Championship and Serbian Cup, which they have historically been dominant in. In recent years, Vojvodina have defeated Partizan and Red Star both home and away several times. Due to their constant recent success, Vojvodina are now considered the third absolute power, after Red Star and Partizan, in Serbian football, comparable to the "big three" dominance in other countries in domestic football, such as Portugal. Besides the Eternal derby, the Derby of Serbia is often considered the most important rivalry in Serbian football.

== History ==
=== Early years ===
Vojvodina was founded on 6 March 1914 by a group of Serbian students of the Serbian Orthodox high school with the support of Serbian intellectuals and craftsman in Novi Sad. The club took the name Vojvodina, in order to emphasize the memory of the political-territorial unit of the Serbs in the Serbian Vojvodina. FK Vojvodina in the period between the two world wars had a fierce rivalry with NAK Novi Sad competing with them regularly for the title of the Novi Sad Football Subassociation.

31 years later, at the end of the Second World War, Red Star and Partizan were founded in Belgrade, while the dominant clubs from the royal era, BSK Belgrade and SK Jugoslavija were disbanded. The origin of Red Star and Partizan went out of political institutions. Red Star was formed on 4 March 1945 by "United alliance of anti-fascist Youth" of Serbian new civil authorities in Yugoslavia. A few months later, specifically on 4 October 1945, Partizan was founded by Serbian Partizans as a club of Yugoslav People's Army. From the beginning, the two Belgrade clubs won championships and cups and took over the dominance as the strongest Serbian clubs in the Yugoslav First League. Red Star and Partizan should remain this until the dissolution of the league in 1993. In 1951, Vojvodina reached for the first time the Yugoslav Cup final and during the 1950s, Vojvodina finished the seasons regularly in the top half of the table and developed slowly as third most successful Serbian club in the Yugoslav First League behind Red Star and Partizan.

=== 1960s ===
During the 1960s, Partizan and Red Star was the dominated teams in the Yugoslav First League. On the international stage, the 1965–66 European Cup campaign of Partizan was the crown, where they achieved the greatest success in their history, a place in European Cup Final. Red Star achieved also good results on the international stage, where they achieved the semifinals of the 1961–62 Inter-Cities Fairs Cup. Besides, Red Star received its own stadium with a capacity for more than 100,000 viewers in 1963, that should get the reputation of being a very tough ground for visiting teams. But finally the dominance was broken through Vojvodina for a short time. In 1966, Vojvodina won, as the third Serbian team, the Yugoslav first league for the first time. In the following season, Vojvodina has continued to be successful also on the international scene. In the 1966–67 European Cup season, Vojvodina achieved the quarter-finals, and lost narrowly against the eventual winner of the competition, Celtic Glasgow. These successes brought the Belgrade clubs another rival for titles, and the matches against the club from Novi Sad received more prestigious.

== Stadiums ==
Main articles: Red Star Stadium, Partizan Stadium and Karađorđe Stadium

When Red Star Belgrade is the host, the derby is played at the Red Star Stadium. The stadium was opened in 1963, and in the course of time and due to the fact that stadium's former total capacity was about 110.000, which was then one of the largest in Europe, it got the unofficial moniker "Marakana", after the large Maracanã stadium in Brazil. The Red Star fans call it sometimes shortly "Mara". During the mid-90s, in order to meet UEFA demands for spectators comfort and security, standing places at the stadium were completely done away with and seats were installed on all four stands. Today, the stadium has a capacity 55,538 seats.

When Partizan Belgrade is the host, the derby is played at the Partizan Stadium. The stadium was opened in 1949 and got extensively renovated in 1998 following FIFA security regulations. This also led to the conversion of the stadium into an all-seater reducing the capacity from 55.000 to 32.710. The club's stadium is now named Partizan Stadium, although it was known as JNA Stadium (Stadion Jugoslovenska Narodna Armija, Stadium of the Yugoslav People's Army) for most of its history, and even today, a lot of football fans in all countries of the former Yugoslavia call it by its old name. The Partizan fans call it also "Fudbalski Hram" (The Temple of Football).

When Vojvodina Novi Sad is the host, the derby is played at the Karađorđe Stadium. It is named after Karađorđe, the leader of the First Serbian uprising against the Ottoman occupation. Formerly, it was known as the City Stadium or Vojvodina Stadium, but it was renamed on request of the Vojvodina fans in 2007 to Karađorđe Stadium. However, it was in fact the older and original name of the stadium that was used from its foundation until the end of the World War II. With a total capacity of about 20 000, of which 12 303 seats, it is one of the largest football stadiums in Serbia.

== Honours and achievements ==
=== Red Star's achievements ===
Internationally, Red Star is the most successful football club from Serbia in every European competition and the only Serbian club that has won an UEFA competition, winning the European Cup in 1991 in Bari, Italy. The same year in Tokyo, Japan the club won the Intercontinental Cup and also played in European Super Cup final which Red Star lost to the UEFA Cup Winners' Cup champion Manchester United where only one match was played in Manchester of two supposed, because of UN sport sanctions imposed on Serbia that lasted until 1995 and influenced much more to later Red Star and generally Serbian European success by having excluded Yugoslav teams from all European and international competitions. The club also had previously made it to the 1979 UEFA Cup Final, losing to Borussia Mönchengladbach. Red Star played in semi-finals of every European competition(UEFA Champions League, UEFA Europa League, UEFA Cup Winners Cup) and played in two Europeans finals(UEFA Europa League in 1979 and European Champion Clubs' Cup in 1991). Red Star have played 15 times in quarter-finals in European competitions. Red Star has also won 51 domestic trophies making them the most successful club in Serbia with a record 27 national league titles and 24 national Cups. Red Star also won two regional trophies of Mitropa Cup in 1958 and in 1968. And among many records Red Star has the longest unbeaten record in the league, and winning streak of 17 games in a row.

=== Partizan's achievements ===
Partizan participated in the first ever 1955–56 European Cup match that took place on 3 September 1955 in Lisbon against Sporting. The final result of this match was 3-3, having won by 5–2 in the second leg in Belgrade. Partizan also played in 1966 European Cup Final, losing it to Real Madrid 1–2, after eliminating Manchester United in the semifinals. In more recent years, the club played in the 2003–04 UEFA Champions League season, after eliminating Newcastle United on the penalties in the last qualifying round and also in the 2010–11 UEFA Champions League season after eliminating R.S.C. Anderlecht again on penalties in the last qualifying round. By 2015, Partizan has won 27 national league titles, 16 national Cups, Mitropa Cup in 1978 and a Yugoslav Supercup in 1989.

=== Vojvodina's achievements ===
In its long history, Vojvodina was one of the most successful clubs in the former Yugoslavia, winning two First League titles, in 1966 and 1989, was runners-up in 1957, 1962 and 1975, and achieved the 3rd place in 1992. Vojvodina was also runners-up of the Yugoslav Cup in 1951. They won the UEFA Intertoto Cup in 1976, the Mitropa Cup in 1977 and was also runners-up of the Mitropa Cup in 1957 and the UEFA Intertoto Cup in 1998 . From 1993 to 1997, Vojvodina achieved in the national championship the 3rd place five times in a row and was runners-up of the domestic cup in 1997. They were runners-up of the Serbian SuperLiga in 2009 and achieved the 3rd place in 2007, 2008, 2011 and 2012. Vojvodina was also runners-up of the Serbian Cup in 2007, 2010, 2011, 2013. and finally winner of Serbian Cup in 2014.

== Red Star vs. Vojvodina ==
=== Statistics ===
Until today 152 derby games were played in the domestic league.

	Red Star wins	Draws	Vojvodina wins	Goal difference
at Red Star Stadium	56	10	14	171:79
at Karađorđe Stadium	28	25	22	113:88
Total	84	35	35	284:167

Until today 17 derby games were played in the national cup.

	Red Star wins	Draws	Vojvodina wins	Goal difference
Total	10	6	1	30:11

Until today 169 derby games were played in all competitions.

	Red Star wins	Draws	Vojvodina wins	Goal difference
Domestic league	84	35	36	284:167
Domestic cup	10	6	1	30:11
Other games	0	0	0	0:0
Total	94	41	37	314:178

=== Last ten matches ===
Competition	Host	Guest	Date	Result
2013–14 Serbian SuperLiga	Vojvodina	Red Star	28.05–2014	3–3
2014–15 Serbian SuperLiga	Vojvodina	Red Star	23–08–2014	0–1
2014–15 Serbian SuperLiga	Red Star	Vojvodina	07–03–2015	3–0
2015–16 Serbian SuperLiga	Red Star	Vojvodina	21–10–2015	3–0
2015–16 Serbian SuperLiga	Vojvodina	Red Star	01–04–2016	0–0
2015–16 Serbian SuperLiga	Red Star	Vojvodina	07–05–2016	1–3
2016–17 Serbian SuperLiga	Red Star	Vojvodina	24–09–2016	4–1
2016–17 Serbian SuperLiga	Vojvodina	Red Star	08–03–2017	2–3
2016–17 Serbian SuperLiga	Red Star	Vojvodina	29–04–2017	2–0
2017–18 Serbian SuperLiga	Red Star	Vojvodina	24–09–2017	2–0

=== Players who have played for both clubs (senior career) ===
- (Socialist Federal Republic of Yugoslavia) Srboljub Krivokuća (Red Star, Vojvodina, again Red Star)
- (Socialist Federal Republic of Yugoslavia) Đorđe Milić (Vojvodina, Red Star)
- (Socialist Federal Republic of Yugoslavia) Ljubomir Milić (Red Star, Vojvodina)
- (Socialist Federal Republic of Yugoslavia) Dojčin Perazić (Red Star, Vojvodina)
- (Socialist Federal Republic of Yugoslavia) Milovan Rajevac (Red Star, Vojvodina)
- (Socialist Federal Republic of Yugoslavia) Milan Jovin (Vojvodina, Red Star)
- (Socialist Federal Republic of Yugoslavia) Miloš Šestić (Red Star, Vojvodina)
- (Socialist Federal Republic of Yugoslavia) Milan Babić (Red Star, Vojvodina)
- (Socialist Federal Republic of Yugoslavia) Aleksandar Stojanović (Red Star, Vojvodina)
- (Socialist Federal Republic of Yugoslavia) Dragan Punišić (Red Star, Vojvodina)
- (Socialist Federal Republic of Yugoslavia) Dejan Joksimović (Red Star, Vojvodina, again Red Star)
- (Socialist Federal Republic of Yugoslavia) Miroslav Tanjga (Vojvodina, Red Star)
- (Serbia) Siniša Mihajlović (Vojvodina, Red Star)
- (Serbia) Saša Drakulić (Red Star, Vojvodina)
- (Serbia) Vladan Lukić (Red Star, Vojvodina)
- (Serbia) Srđan Bajčetić (Vojvodina, Red Star)
- (Serbia) Miodrag Pantelić (Vojvodina, Red Star, again Vojvodina)
- (Serbia) Marko Perović (Vojvodina, Red Star)
- (Serbia) Bratislav Živković (Vojvodina, Red Star)
- (Serbia) Darko Anić (Vojvodina, Red Star)
- (Serbia) Nenad Vanić (Red Star, Vojvodina)
- (Serbia) Dragan Vulević (Red Star, Vojvodina)
- (Serbia) Goran Stojiljković (Red Star, Vojvodina)
- (Serbia) Aleksandar Kocić (Vojvodina, Red Star)
- (Serbia) Nikoslav Bjegović (Vojvodina, Red Star)
- (Montenegro) Žarko Dragaš (Red Star, Vojvodina)
- (Serbia) Aleksandar Mijatović (Red Star, Vojvodina)
- (Serbia) Aleksandar Popović (Red Star, Vojvodina)
- (Serbia) Vladimir Matijašević (Vojvodina, Red Star)
- (Serbia) Dragan Šarac (Red Star, Vojvodina)
- (Serbia) Vidak Bratić (Vojvodina, Red Star)
- (Serbia) Petar Puača (Red Star, Vojvodina)
- (Serbia) Igor Bogdanović (Vojvodina, Red Star)
- (Serbia) Konstantin Ognjanović (Red Star, Vojvodina)
- (Bosnia and Herzegovina) Nenad Miljković (Red Star, Vojvodina)
- (Serbia) Leo Lerinc (Vojvodina, Red Star, again Vojvodina)
- (Serbia) Branko Jelić (Red Star, Vojvodina)
- (Serbia) Vladimir Mudrinić (Red Star, Vojvodina)
- (Serbia) Nebojša Joksimović (Vojvodina, Red Star)
- (Serbia) Nemanja Cvetković (Red Star, Vojvodina, again Red Star)
- (Serbia) Dragomir Vukobratović (Vojvodina, Red Star)
- (Serbia) Jagoš Vuković (Red Star, Vojvodina)
- (Serbia) Nenad Stojanović (Red Star, Vojvodina)
- (Serbia) Miloš Stojčev (Red Star, Vojvodina)
- (Serbia) Veseljko Trivunović (Red Star, Vojvodina)
- (Serbia) Nikola Lazetić (Red Star, Vojvodina, again Red Star, again Vojvodina)
- (Montenegro) Radovan Krivokapić (Vojvodina, Red Star, again Vojvodina)
- (Serbia) Ivan Gvozdenović (Red Star, Vojvodina)
- (Serbia) Nino Pekarić (Vojvodina, Red Star, again Vojvodina)
- (Serbia) Nikola Trajković (Vojvodina, Red Star)
- (Serbia) Nikola Petković (Vojvodina, Red Star)
- (Serbia) Dragan Mrđa (Red Star, Vojvodina, again Red Star)
- (Serbia) Ognjen Mudrinski (Vojvodina, Red Star)
- (Switzerland) Boban Maksimović (Red Star, Vojvodina)
- (Cameroon) Aboubakar Oumarou (Red Star, Vojvodina)
- (Serbia) Andrija Kaluđerović (Red Star, Vojvodina)
- (Serbia) Saša Cilinšek (Vojvodina, Red Star)
- (Montenegro) Savo Pavićević (Vojvodina, Red Star)
- (Serbia) Damir Kahriman (Vojvodina, Red Star)
- (Serbia) Aleksandar Katai (Vojvodina, Red Star)
- (Serbia) Ognjen Ožegović (Red Star, Vojvodina)
- (Serbia) Predrag Sikimić (Vojvodina, Red Star)
- (Serbia) Nikola Antić (Red Star, Vojvodina)
- (Bosnia and Herzegovina) Nemanja Supić (Vojvodina, Red Star)
- (Serbia) Marko Poletanović (Vojvodina, Red Star)
- (Serbia) Miloš Trifunović (Red Star, Vojvodina)
- (Serbia) Bogdan Planić (Red Star, Vojvodina)
- (Serbia) Nenad Gavrić (Red Star, Vojvodina)
- (Serbia) Milan Pavkov (Vojvodina, Red Star)
- (Ghana) Abraham Frimpong (Vojvodina, Red Star)
- (Serbia) Srđan Babić (Vojvodina, Red Star)
- (Serbia) Stefan Mihajlović (Red Star, Vojvodina)
- (North Macedonia) Daniel Avramovski (Red Star, Vojvodina)
- (Serbia) Dušan Jovančić (Vojvodina, Red Star)
- (Serbia) Dejan Meleg (Vojvodina, Red Star)

=== Players who have played for one club in youth career and for rival club in senior career ===
- (Serbia) Aleksandar Čanović (youth career Red Star, senior career Vojvodina)
- (Montenegro) Marko Đalović (youth career Red Star, senior career Vojvodina)
- (Serbia) Marko Ljubinković (youth career Red Star, senior career Vojvodina)
- (Montenegro) Ivan Fatić (youth career Red Star, senior career Vojvodina)
- (North Macedonia) Mario Đurovski (youth career Red Star, senior career Vojvodina)
- (Montenegro) Stefan Denković (youth career Red Star, senior career Vojvodina)
- (Serbia) Miloš Vesić (youth career Vojvodina, senior career Red Star)
- (Serbia) Stefan Nikolić (youth career Red Star, Vojvodina, senior career Vojvodina)
- (Serbia) Luka Luković (youth career Red Star, Vojvodina, senior career Vojvodina)
- (Serbia) Stefan Đorđević (youth career Vojvodina, senior career Red Star)
- (Serbia) Ivan Rogač (youth career Red Star, senior career Vojvodina)
- (Serbia) Ivan Lakićević (youth career Red Star, senior career Vojvodina)
- (Serbia) Nikola Ašćerić (youth career Red Star, senior career Vojvodina)

=== Played for one club and coached the rival club ===
- (Socialist Federal Republic of Yugoslavia) Dragoljub Milošević (as player Red Star, as manager Vojvodina)
- (Socialist Federal Republic of Yugoslavia) Dragoslav Stepanović (as player Red Star, as manager Vojvodina)
- (Serbia) Nenad Vanić (as player Red Star, Vojvodina, as manager Vojvodina)

=== Coaches who have managed both clubs ===
- (Socialist Federal Republic of Yugoslavia) Branislav Sekulić (Vojvodina, Red Star)
- (Socialist Federal Republic of Yugoslavia) Ljubiša Broćić (Red Star, Vojvodina, again Red Star)
- (Socialist Federal Republic of Yugoslavia) Branko Stanković (Vojvodina, Red Star)
- (Socialist Federal Republic of Yugoslavia) Gojko Zec (Vojvodina, Red Star)
- (Socialist Federal Republic of Yugoslavia) Milorad Pavić (Red Star, Vojvodina)
- (Socialist Federal Republic of Yugoslavia) Ljupko Petrović (Vojvodina, Red Star, again Vojvodina, again Red Star, again Vojvodina)
- (Socialist Federal Republic of Yugoslavia) Milorad Kosanović (Vojvodina, Red Star)
- (Socialist Federal Republic of Yugoslavia) Vladimir Petrović (Red Star, Vojvodina, again Red Star)
- (Socialist Federal Republic of Yugoslavia) Milovan Rajevac (Red Star, Vojvodina)
- (Serbia) Nenad Lalatović (Red Star, Vojvodina)

== Partizan vs. Vojvodina ==
=== Statistics ===
Until today 164 derby games were played in the domestic league.

	Partizan	Draws	Vojvodina wins	Goal difference
at Partizan Stadium	52	13	16	173:85
at Karađorđe Stadium	37	22	22	125:95
Total	89	35	39	298:180

Until today 16 derby games were played in the national cup.

	Partizan wins	Draws	Vojvodina wins	Goal difference
Total	10	2	4	30:14

Until today 191 derby games were played in all competitions.

	Partizan wins	Draws	Vojvodina wins	Goal difference
Domestic league	89	35	41	298:180
Domestic cup	10	2	4	30:14
Other games***	4	4	3	23:21
Total	103	41	48	338:198

- Partizan and Vojvodina also play in the tournament "TV Champions league" (Serbian: TV Liga šampiona; ТВ Лига шампиона) and Supercup of Yugoslavia which Partizan wоn in 1989.
- Partizan and Vojvodina also play in the tournament, Summer champions league" („Летња Лига Шампиона"). That competition was held in 1969., 1970., 1971., 1972., and 1973. They meet five times.
- They also played the, Second Triangular Tournament" („Други триагонал турнир") in Belgrade, organized by the Radio Television of Serbia (RTS) during the NATO bombing of Serbia. In that match at the Partizan stadium, they played a draw. [2]

=== Last ten matches ===
Competition	Host	Guest	Date	Result
2014–15 Serbian SuperLiga	Vojvodina	Partizan	04.05.2015.	0–4
2015–16 Serbian SuperLiga	Vojvodina	Partizan	13.08.2015.	3–2
2015–16 Serbian SuperLiga	Partizan	Vojvodina	05.12.2015.	0–2
2015–16 Serbian SuperLiga	Partizan	Vojvodina	21.05.2016.	3–2
2016–17 Serbian SuperLiga	Partizan	Vojvodina	07.08.2016	1–3
2016–17 Serbian SuperLiga	Vojvodina	Partizan	30.11.2016.	0–0
2016–17 Serbian SuperLiga	Partizan	Vojvodina	22.04.2017.	1–0
2016–17 Serbian Cup	Vojvodina	Partizan	26.04.2017.	0–0
2016–17 Serbian Cup	Partizan	Vojvodina	10.05.2017.	1–0
2017–18 Serbian SuperLiga	Vojvodina	Partizan	13.08.2017.	0–1

=== Players who have played for both clubs (senior career) ===
- (Romania) Virgil Popescu (Vojvodina, Partizan)
- (Socialist Federal Republic of Yugoslavia) Todor Veselinović (Vojvodina, Partizan, again Vojvodina)
- (Socialist Federal Republic of Yugoslavia) Svemir Đorđić (Vojvodina, Partizan)
- (Socialist Federal Republic of Yugoslavia) Antun Herceg (Vojvodina, Partizan)
- (Socialist Federal Republic of Yugoslavia) Josip Pirmajer (Partizan, Vojvodina)
- (Socialist Federal Republic of Yugoslavia) Josip Duvančić (Partizan, Vojvodina)
- (Socialist Federal Republic of Yugoslavia) Milan Vukelić (Vojvodina, Partizan)
- (Socialist Federal Republic of Yugoslavia) Slobodan Pavković (Vojvodina, Partizan)
- (Socialist Federal Republic of Yugoslavia) Milan Babić (Partizan, Vojvodina)
- (Socialist Federal Republic of Yugoslavia) Nikola Marjanović (Partizan, Vojvodina)
- (Socialist Federal Republic of Yugoslavia) Zvonko Popović (Partizan, Vojvodina)
- (Socialist Federal Republic of Yugoslavia) Radoslav Nikodijević (Partizan, Vojvodina)
- (Socialist Federal Republic of Yugoslavia) Milonja Đukić (Partizan, Vojvodina, again Partizan)
- (Socialist Federal Republic of Yugoslavia) Dejan Joksimović (Vojvodina, Partizan)
- (Socialist Federal Republic of Yugoslavia) Slaviša Jokanović (Vojvodina, Partizan)
- (Socialist Federal Republic of Yugoslavia) Budimir Vujačić (Vojvodina, Partizan)
- (Socialist Federal Republic of Yugoslavia) Ljubomir Vorkapić (Vojvodina, Partizan)
- (Socialist Federal Republic of Yugoslavia) Zoran Milinković (Partizan, Vojvodina)
- (Socialist Federal Republic of Yugoslavia) Petar Puača (Partizan, Vojvodina)
- (Socialist Federal Republic of Yugoslavia) Zoltan Sabo (Vojvodina, Partizan)
- (Socialist Federal Republic of Yugoslavia) Nikoslav Bjegović (Partizan, Vojvodina)
- (Bosnia and Herzegovina) Siniša Mulina (Partizan, Vojvodina)
- (Serbia) Ivica Francišković (Partizan, Vojvodina)
- (Serbia) Ljubiša Vukelja (Vojvodina, Partizan, again Vojvodina)
- (Serbia) Žarko Lazetić (Partizan, Vojvodina)
- (Montenegro) Bojan Šljivančanin (Vojvodina, Partizan)
- (Serbia) Milan Jović (Partizan, Vojvodina)
- (Serbia) Vladimir Vukajlović (Partizan, Vojvodina)
- (Serbia) Mladen Lazarević (Partizan, Vojvodina)
- (Serbia) Milan Vještica (Vojvodina, Partizan)
- (Uganda) Nestroy Kizito (Vojvodina, Partizan)
- (Montenegro) Slaven Stjepanović (Partizan, Vojvodina)
- (Montenegro) Risto Lakić (Partizan, Vojvodina)
- (Serbia) Milovan Milović (Partizan, Vojvodina)
- (Serbia) Đorđe Zafirović (Partizan, Vojvodina)
- (Serbia) Brana Ilić (Partizan, Vojvodina)
- (Serbia) Vladimir Branković (Partizan, Vojvodina)
- (Guinea-Bissau) Almami Moreira (Partizan, Vojvodina)
- (Montenegro) Simon Vukčević (Partizan, Vojvodina)
- (Serbia) Miroslav Vulićević (Vojvodina, Partizan)
- (Serbia) Branislav Trajković (Vojvodina, Partizan)
- (Serbia) Marko Živković (Partizan, Vojvodina)
- (Serbia) Petar Škuletić (Partizan, Vojvodina, again Partizan)
- (Cameroon) Aboubakar Oumarou (Vojvodina, Partizan)
- (Montenegro) Nebojša Kosović (Vojvodina, Partizan)
- (Serbia) Nikola Leković (Vojvodina, Partizan)
- (Serbia) Filip Malbašić (Partizan, Vojvodina)
- (Serbia) Nikola Trujić (Partizan, Vojvodina)
- (Serbia) Filip Knežević (Partizan, Vojvodina)
- (Serbia) Nikola Aksentijević (Partizan, Vojvodina)
- (Serbia) Nemanja R. Miletić (Vojvodina, Partizan)
- (Serbia) Ognjen Ožegović (Vojvodina, Partizan)
- (Ivory Coast) Ismaël Béko Fofana (Partizan, Vojvodina)

=== Players who have played for one club in youth career and for the rival club in senior career ===
- (Serbia) Stanko Svitlica (youth career Vojvodina, senior career Partizan)
- (Hungary) Tibor Szabo (youth career Partizan, senior career Vojvodina)
- (Serbia) Vladimir Martinović (youth career Partizan, senior career Vojvodina)
- (Bosnia and Herzegovina) Marinko Mačkić (youth career Partizan, senior career Vojvodina)
- (Serbia) Igor Đurić (youth career Partizan, senior career Vojvodina)
- (Serbia) Milan Bojović (youth career Partizan, senior career Vojvodina)
- (Bosnia and Herzegovina) Nikola Popara (youth career Partizan, senior career Vojvodina)
- (Serbia) Borivoje Ristić (youth career Partizan, senior career Vojvodina)
- (Serbia) Miljan Mrdaković (youth career Partizan, senior career Vojvodina)
- (Serbia) Milan Milinković (youth career Partizan, senior career Vojvodina)

=== Played for one or both clubs and coached only one rival ===
- (Socialist Federal Republic of Yugoslavia) Todor Veselinović (as player Vojvodina, Partizan, as manager Vojvodina)
- (Socialist Federal Republic of Yugoslavia) Josip Pirmajer (as player Partizan, Vojvodina, as manager Vojvodina)
- (Socialist Federal Republic of Yugoslavia) Slobodan Pavković (as player Vojvodina, Partizan, as manager Vojvodina)
- (Socialist Federal Republic of Yugoslavia) Branko Smiljanić (as player Partizan, as manager Vojvodina)
- (Montenegro) Dejan Vukićević (as player Partizan, as manager Vojvodina)
- (Serbia) Ilija Stolica (as player Partizan, as manager Vojvodina)
- (Serbia) Nebojša Vignjević (as player youth career Partizan, as manager Vojvodina)

=== Coaches who have managed both clubs ===
- (Socialist Federal Republic of Yugoslavia) Gojko Zec (Partizan, Vojvodina)
- (Socialist Federal Republic of Yugoslavia) Josip Duvančić (Partizan, Vojvodina)
- (Socialist Federal Republic of Yugoslavia) Tomislav Kaloperović (Partizan, Vojvodina)
- (Socialist Federal Republic of Yugoslavia) Marko Valok (Partizan, Vojvodina)
- (Serbia) Marko Nikolić (Vojvodina, Partizan)
- (Serbia) Zoran Milinković (Vojvodina, Partizan)

=== Players who have played for all three clubs (senior career) ===
- (Socialist Federal Republic of Yugoslavia) Milan Babić (Red Star, Partizan, Vojvodina)
- (Socialist Federal Republic of Yugoslavia) Dejan Joksimović (Red Star, Vojvodina, Partizan, again Red Star)
- (Socialist Federal Republic of Yugoslavia) Petar Puača (Red Star, Partizan, again Red Star, Vojvodina)
- (Socialist Federal Republic of Yugoslavia) Nikoslav Bjegović (Partizan, Vojvodina, Red Star)
- (Cameroon) Aboubakar Oumarou (Red Star, Vojvodina, Partizan)
- (Serbia) Ognjen Ožegović (Red Star, Vojvodina, Partizan)

=== Players who have played for one club in youth career and for another two in senior career ===
- (Socialist Federal Republic of Yugoslavia) Nikola Marjanović (youth career Red Star, senior career Partizan, Vojvodina)
- (Serbia) Žarko Lazetić (youth career Red Star, senior career Partizan, Vojvodina)
- (Serbia) Nikola Antić (youth career Partizan, senior career Red Star, Vojvodina)

=== Coaches who have managed all three clubs ===
- (Socialist Federal Republic of Yugoslavia) Gojko Zec (Partizan, Vojvodina, Red Star)

== See also ==
- List of association football rivalries
- Eternal derby (Serbia)
- List of FK Partizan players
- List of Red Star Belgrade footballers
- List of FK Vojvodina players
