= History of FK Vojvodina =

The history of FK Vojvodina began as the brainchild of a circle from the Novi Sad aristocracy. FK Vojvodina's team colors were inspired by SK Slavia Prague, and the two teams still share the same colors as of 2015.

== Founding ==
On 6 March 1914, in Sava Šijakov's weaving mill in the Temerinska Street 12, a group of students of the Serbian Orthodox high school established with the help of intellectuals and craftsman a football club in Novi Sad. The club was founded in secrecy, because the former Austro-Hungarian authorities banned larger organized gatherings of juveniles in the Vojvodina region which was inhabited mostly by Serbs. The club took the name Vojvodina, in order to emphasize the memory of the political-territorial unit of the Serbs in the "Serbian Vojvodina" in which the Serbs, at least on paper, get the same rights as all other citizens in the Habsburg Empire for which they have fought for years. The name Vojvodina means in Serbian a type of duchy, more specifically, a voivodeship. It derives from the word "vojvoda", and means "one who leads warriors" or "war leader".

Among the club founders on that day were the future textile industrialist Milenko Šijakov, the future university professor Vladimir Milićević, the future chemists Milenko Hinić, the future lawyers Radenko Rakić and Kamenko Ćirić, Gojko Tosić, Đorđe Živanov, Branko Gospođinački, the future doctor of law Kosta Hadži and others. The new club played its first match in the village of Kovilj against local club FK Šajkaš. Vojvodina played in bright blue colours and white shorts and won by 5–0. Svetozar Jocković, Jovan Ljubojević, Milorad Milićević, Dusan Kovačev, Jovan Jocković, Ozren Stojanovic, Sava Ignjačev, Gavanski, Predrag Stojanovic Ciga, Živojin Đeremov and Uros Čakovac entered the record books as the first players in the history of Vojvodina. The players were mainly pupils and students, who came from Prague in the summer holidays and played only that one match, because shortly before World War I broke out. The strict hand of the Austro-Hungarian authorities stopped all Serbian organizations in Novi Sad and Vojvodina was the first time in the situation to be shut down.

== The Millionaires team (1918–1944) ==
Flag of Vojvodina Novi Sad.

After the liberation, Vojvodina resumed the work thanks to the enthusiasm of Serbian students from Prague. The first president of Vojvodina became Milenko Šijakov, son of weaving mill owner Sava Šijak, and the first secretary became Dr. Živko Bajazet, the longtime president of the Serbian merchant bank and member of the Sokol organization. The club financed solely by membership fees and by generous contributions as by Maks Grin, Daka Popović, the Novaković brothers, Ilija Balabušić and the members of Dunđerski family. Part of the Vojvodina players and management who studied in Prague, were also members of football club Slavia Prague. The Czech club supported the Vojvodina members during the difficult times before and during World War I and contributed in the development of the club. In 1920, was brought from Prague the first set of red and white jerseys. At the club meeting held on 23 July 1922, it was decided that in honour of Slavia Prague the red and white colors adorn the jerseys of Vojvodina. The coat of arms was also partially modeled after Slavia Prague's coat of arms, where the red star of the Czech team was replaced with the blue star, so that Vojvodina's coat of arms had all the colors of the Serbian flag. The first coach, technical director and chief organizer of Vojvodina was the lawyer Dr. Kosta Hadži, one of the main founder of Vojvodina and the Novi Sad Football Subassociation. Under his leadership, Vojvodina won the Novi Sad Subassociation league in 1926, which was the first trophy in its history. Vojvodina played with following players: Mihajlović, Živić, Kričkov, Popović, Vajs, Aleksić, Grgarov, Marjanović, Šević, Petrović, Dudás and Saraz. The club provided the first professional contracts to its players, and also brought professional players from abroad such as Czech Josef Čapek and Hungarians Sándor Dudás and Abraham Saraz. One of the best and most influential Vojvodina players at that time was Dušan Marković, an effective striker who played for Vojvodina from 1921 to 1935. End of the 1930s, Vojvodina brought many good players into the team, which was later known as the Millionaires team and one of the best was Jožef Velker, which became to a crucial player of the club. In 1932, 1934, 1935, 1937–1940, Vojvodina won the Novi Sad Football Subassociation league. Since then, Vojvodina begun having serious pretensions to gain promotion to the Yugoslav First League. The club failed to immediately make an impact, but during the season 1940/41, Vojvodina fought for the top. The final stage of the championship was interrupted by the beginning of World War II, and the Axis bombing, mobilization and country's occupation made the continuation of the competition impossible.

This period between the two world wars was marked by a fierce rivalry that existed in Novi Sad between Vojvodina and NAK.

== The tragedy (1939–1944) ==
During World War II, the Kingdom of Yugoslavia was invaded and partitioned by the Axis powers, and its northern parts, including Novi Sad, were annexed by Hungary. One of the first decisions of the occupiers was the prohibition of Vojvodina and the confiscation of its property. Large parts of the club archives were destroyed by the new authorities, and most of the trophies which were won up to this time were lost. The local population was suppressed and many Serbian, as well as Jewish, Roma and other civilians, were murdered (including women, children and the elderly), perished in concentration camps, like the Šarvar concentration camp, or were expelled, including many Vojvodina members. But many citizens of all ethnicities – mostly Serbs, but also some anti-fascist and pro-Serb local Hungarians, Slovaks and others – joined the resistance and fought together against the fascist occupation, among them, many Vojvodina members. Especially bloody was 1942, when in a single sweep Hungarian troops killed over 4,000 local Serbs, Jews and Roma, mostly during the Novi Sad massacre. During the war, Vojvodina lost almost the entire team, among them: Božidar Petrović, Milan Simin and his brother Pera Simin, Dušana Šućov, Svetozar Džanić, Milan Stoja, Živko Brzak and Radovan Božin. Also many club officials and fans died.

== Golden generation and the fifth force (1944–1961) ==
Surviving club members, players and board members, led by Dr. Kosta Hadži, Đuro Živić, Branko Milovanović and Aleksandar Kanazir, initiated the restoration work of the club in 1944. On 24 July, in 1946, the new communist authorities decided the merger of three clubs from Novi Sad: Vojvodina, Slavija and Radnički under the new name Sloga Novi Sad. This met a lot of resistance among the population and the supporters continued to call the club Vojvodina. The club initially played in the Yugoslav Second League until it reached the promotion to the Yugoslav First League in 1948.

In 1950, after a long resistance by the supporters, the old name Vojvodina was returned. The following year, Vojvodina reached for the first time the Yugoslav Cup final and was the first team in Yugoslavia, which broke the myth of the so-called " Velika četvorka – the big four" (Red Star Belgrade, Partizan Belgrade, Hajduk Split, Dinamo Zagreb). This was the beginning of the so-called golden generation, which was known for its developed technical football. On 11 December, in 1955, Vojvodina played against Hajduk in Split and after an impressive football display from Vojvodina, the thrilled fans of Hajduk took the Vojvodina players on their shoulders and carried them from the field. In the 1950s, Vojvodina finished the seasons regularly in the top half of the table. In 1953, they finished the season as fourth, 1957 as second, 1959 as third and became the fifth force in the Yugoslav football. Also on the international stage Vojvodina had good results, so in 1957, where they reached the Mitropa Cup final, and two years later the semi-finals. During this period, the most influential players were Vujadin Boškov, Todor Veselinović, Zdravko Rajkov, Sima Milovanov, Dobrosav Krstić, Stevan Bena and Aleksandar Ivoš. Striker Todor Veselinović was the top scorer of the Yugoslav league in 1956, 1957, 1958 and 1961.

== Winning of the first championship (1960s) ==
In 1962, Vojvodina was runners-up. However, the results deteriorated in the following seasons and Vojvodina even started fighting against relegation. In 1964 everything changed with Vujadin Boškov as the technical director and Branko Stanković as coach. Vujadin Boškov remodeled and modernized the club. The infrastructure was improved and a new sports center was built. It also organized a successful scouting network and the administration, headed by president Arsa Kovačević, was able to provide all necessary conditions for the competition. Coach Branko Stanković changed the style of play and shifted the emphasis on discipline and running. The only player who had a free hand was Silvester Takač, one of the best players of this generation. In 1966, Vojvodina won the Yugoslav first league for the first time with eight points ahead of second placed Dinamo Zagreb. Members of this generation were Silvester Takač, Ilija Pantelić, Žarko Nikolić, Ivica Brzić, Rajko Aleksić, Đorđe Pavlić, Dobrivoje Trivić, Stevan Sekereš, Đorđe Milić and Stevan Nešticki.

In the following season, Vojvodina also was successful on the international scene. In the first round of the 1966/67 European Cup, they defeated Austrian representatives Admira Wien by a goal from Takač. In the second round Vojvodina played against the favored Atlético Madrid. The first leg was played in Novi Sad and Vojvodina won by 3–1, with goals from Takač, Pantelić and Brzić, and Atlético legend Luis Aragonés scored for his side. In the second leg, Atlético Madrid beat Vojvodina with 2–0, so it was 3–3 on aggregate. According to the rules at that time, a third game had to be played. Hoping to turn it into an advantage, Atlético proposed that the decisive match be played in Madrid in their home ground, and enticed Vojvodina by offering substantial financial compensation ($50,000 for the club, plus $1,000 for each player) besides covering the accommodation and return ticket expenses. The management of Vojvodina accepted the proposal, a decision which met incomprehension among the fans. However, aware of the risk, the coach Vujadin Boškov decided to take a chance, as believed in his team’s strength and the possibility of going through. In the third decisive match, Vojvodina won after overtime by a goal from Takač with 3–2. Later, in the following winter transfer window, Vojvodina sold Takač to Stade Rennais, because they needed to increase their finances for the new floodlights; however that turned to be a bad decision, as he turned out to be irreplaceable. In the quarter-finals, Vojvodina played against Celtic and won the first leg in Novi Sad by a goal from Stanić with 1–0, before being knocked out in dramatic circumstances by 2–0, thanks to a last minute goal by Celtic captain Billy McNeill. That season Celtic would win the European Cup, and Celtic players later said that Vojvodina was the best side they had faced that season. In fact, Celtic lost only against Vojvodina. The following season Vojvodina was fourth and qualified for the 1967–68 Inter-Cities Fairs Cup season. They beat G.D. Fabril from Portugal, Lokomotive Leipzig and Göztepe S.K. from Turkey, but lost against FC Bologna again in the quarterfinals. On 29 April 1968, Vojvodina players tragically lost their teammate and the fans one of their heroes – Stevan Nešticki died in a car crash in Novi Sad. He was only 28 years old. In his honour, a football tournament and a street in Novi Sad carries his name.

== The first European trophy (1970s) ==
In 1972, Vojvodina Novi Sad achieved 4th place, but in the following seasons, good results were absent. Their fortune changed 1974, when the club legend Todor Veselinovic took the team as the new coach. Already in 1975, Vojvodina battled for their third title. The main rival was Hajduk Split. Vojvodina beat them in both league matches, in Novi Sad by 2:0 and in Split by 4:1, but Hajduk Split won the championship at the end. In 1977, Vojvodina left Fiorentina, Sparta Prague and Vasas Budapest behind and won its first European trophy, the Mitropa Cup. Members of this generation were players like Zvonko Ivezić, Ratko Svilar, Petar Nikezić, Đorđe Vujkov, Slavko Ličinar, Šandor Mokuš and Martin Novoselac. Todor Veselinović was the coach throughout the entire European campaign, except the last match which was led by Branko Stanković, who won the first championship with Vojvodina in 1966.

== The second title (1980s) ==
In 1985, Vojvodina reached the semifinals of the Yugoslav Cup, but lost against Red Star. Unexpectedly, the next 1985/86 season turned out to be the worst in Vojvodina history. They finished as 18th in the league and were relegated to a lower rank of the competition. However, under coach Tonko Vukušić, Vojvodina won in 1987 the Yugoslav Second League and returned to the first league after only a year of absence. For the season 1987/88, Vojvodina's management, led by Ljubo Španjol, Milorad Kosanović and the new coach Ivica Brzić, succeed to bring together a competitive team. Vojvodina signed a number of talented players like Siniša Mihajlović, Slaviša Jokanović, Budimir Vujačić, Miroslav Tanjga and veteran Miloš Šestić.

In 1989, under the new coach Ljupko Petrović, Vojvodina spent almost the whole championship as league leaders. During the season, Vojvodina won at home against all top four Yugoslav clubs. Partizan Belgrade was defeated by goals by 3–2, Dinamo Zagreb by 4–1, Hajduk Split by 2–0 and finally Red Star by 3–1 in front of more than 27,000 spectators. Vojvodina played the decisive game for the championship against Sloboda Tuzla and needed a win to clinch the title ahead of rival Red Star. Vojvodina won in front of 27,000 spectators by goals from Šestić (twice), Vorkapić and Vujačić with 4–2. The final whistle sparked off a huge celebration inside the stadium as well as a massive celebratory pitch invasion. The second championship trophy was finally won with three points ahead, after 23 years of waiting, by the new generation of players, such as Siniša Mihajlović, Miloš Šestić, Slaviša Jokanović, Budimir Vujačić, Ljubomir Vorkapić, Miroslav Tanjga, Goran Kartalija, Dušan Mijić, Svetozar Šapurić, Čedo Maras, Stevan Milovac, Dragan Punišić and Zoran Mijucić. The following season, Vojvodina fell unhappily in the first round of European Cup against Honvéd Budapest, although most of the key players from the previous league-winning season remained. Losing the first leg by 1–0 at Honvéd was extremely disappointing. During the second leg, things went much better as Vojvodina got up 2–0 by goals from Siniša Mihajlović and Miroslav Tanjga, however a late own goal by defender Dragan Gaćeša dashed Vojvodina hopes of progressing further.

== The eternal third (1990–1999) ==
In 1990, Vojvodina failed to defend the previously acquired title and finished the season as 11th. The disintegration of Yugoslavia, the civil war (1992–1995), the inflation and the UN sanctions have hit the Yugoslav football teams hard. The difficult situation forced Vojvodina to sell its best players and the champions team broke up in the early nineties. However, Vojvodina's management, led by Milutin Popivoda, succeeded to assemble a new team. The coaches, mainly Milorad Kosanović, made also a great combination of players from Vojvodina's excellent youth like, Jovo Bosančić, Goran Šaula, Radoslav Samardžić, Goran Ćurko and Srđan Bajčetić, and players from other areas like Aleksandar Kocić, Dejan Govedarica, Goran Jezdimirović, Miodrag Pantelić, Vesko Mihajlović and Zoltan Sabo. From 1992, Vojvodina achieved in the championship always the 3rd place, 6 times in a row, and received the call of the eternal third. In 1995, they finished the first half of the season on the first place. Because of the UN sanctions, in this period Vojvodina, as all the rest of the clubs from FR Yugoslavia, was not allowed to compete in European competitions and the question on how this generation would have played on the international scene was left. However, in 1995, Vojvodina played a friendly match in Amsterdam against Ajax, in the season when they won the UEFA Champions League, where the "old lady" of Serbian football defeated them by 3–2. In 1997, Vojvodina achieved also the cup final, but lost against Red Star. In 1998, Vojvodina started one after another victory in UEFA Intertoto Cup. After eliminating Stabæk (2–0, 2–2), Örebro SK (3–0, 1–0) and Baltika Kaliningrad (3–0, 1–0) in the first three rounds, Vojvodina played the semi-final against SC Bastia. In the first leg, held in Bastia, Vojvodina suffered a 2–0 defeat. Although they were not given any chances in the return leg in Novi Sad, Vojvodina pulled off a convincing 4–0 win. The cup final was played against Werder Bremen. The first match in Bremen was lost by 1–0 and the return game ended with 1–1. Vojvodina coach was Tomislav Manojlović and the red-white jersey was worn by players like Nikola Lazetić, Zdravko Drinčić, Vidak Bratić, Jovan Tanasijević, Vladimir Mudrinić, Zoran Janković, Dragan Žilić, Mićo Vranješ, Saša Cilinšek, Vladimir Matijašević and Leo Lerinc.

== Crisis (2001–2006) ==

Vojvodina's team of the decade 2000–2010, elected by the fans.

In the 2000/01 season, Vojvodina fought unexpectedly for competitive survival in the elite and the club ran into financial problems. The departure of the club director Svetozar Šapurić opened the descent and Vojvodina entered in a several years long crisis. In a short period of time, numerous managers and coaches were changed regularly and the situation deteriorated more and more. This was a period of mediocre results and the circle of selling the best players to richer European clubs after just a couple of seasons of first-team football and replacing them with fresh young talents. Despite that, at that period, a large number of class players worn the jersey of Vojvodina like Miloš Krasić, Milan Jovanović, Milan Stepanov, Ranko Despotović, Vlada Avramov, Bojan Neziri, Vidak Bratić, Jovan Tanasijević, Radoslav Batak, Milan Vještica, Milan Belić and Miodrag Stošić. In 2005, as a final act of desperation, the organised supporters, the Firmaši and Vojvodina's oldest supporters, called the Stara Garda (English: Old Guard), gathered and took over the assembly of the club to make the public aware on their dissatisfaction and the bad situation in the club. In the same year, the newly arrived club president Ratko Butorović announced a better future for club. The squad was improved and in fact followed the stabilization and the rise of the club, both financial and in terms of results. Also, the management announced large reconstructions of the stadium and training facility, which were realized in the following years.

== Ratko Butorović era (2006–13) ==
In 2007, Vojvodina was third in the Serbian SuperLiga and reached the Serbian Cup final against Red Star, but failed to take home the trophy. The following season they started with the 2007/08 UEFA Cup qualifiers. After eliminating Hibernians F.C. (5–1, 2–0) in the first round, they played the second round against the favored Atlético Madrid, more than 40 years after the triple matches in the 1966/67 Europa Cup season. In the first leg, held in Madrid, Vojvodina was defeated by goals from Maxi Rodríguez, Diego Forlán and Sergio Agüero in front of 42,000 spectators with 3–0. In the return leg in Novi Sad, Vojvodina lost again by 1–2. In 2008, Vojvodina was again third in the Serbian SuperLiga and in 2009, Vojvodina was runners-up, which was a huge step for Vojvodina as the club finished second in the league, behind Partizan but in front of Red Star. This was the first time that a team other than the two big Belgrade clubs finished in the top two for many years. In 2010, Vojvodina was fourth and qualified so again for the UEFA Europa League. Vojvodina was also one of the cup finalists. Previously Partizan was defeated by 3–1, but lost the final again against Red Star. In 2011, Vojvodina was third and was again one of the cup finalists, this time against Partizan, and the game was marred with controversy, culminating with Vojvodina players walked off the pitch in the 83rd minute of the game to protest, after several controversial decisions by the referee, with score standing at 1–2 in favour of Partizan. Initially, Partizan was declared winners and awarded the trophy but later this decision was revised pending an ongoing investigation by the Serbian FA. On 16 May 2011 the match was officially registered as a Vojvodina forfeit (0:3 Partizan victory). In the following season Vojvodina reinforced its team by numerous acquisitions and the expectations were high. In the 2011–12 Serbian SuperLiga season, followed a further third placement and a semifinal of the Serbian cup. Vojvodina defeated in the recent years, home and away, several times the two big clubs from Belgrade, Red Star and Partizan. Due to the constant successes of the last years, Vojvodina became the third absolute power in the Serbian football. Also, a large number of quality players wore the Vojvodina jersey in this period.

Many players contributed to these successes, some of them are Gojko Kačar, Dušan Tadić, Dragan Mrđa, Marcelo Pletsch, Aboubakar Oumarou, Ranko Despotović, Željko Brkić, Daniel Mojsov, Slobodan Medojević, Miroslav Stevanović, Vlatko Grozdanoski, Giorgi Merebashvili, Miroslav Vulićević, Brana Ilić, Branislav Trajković, Vuk Mitošević, Damir Kahriman, Janko Tumbasević, Darko Lovrić, Savo Pavićević, Joseph Kizito, Danijel Aleksić, Mario Gjurovski, Aleksandar Katai, Nino Pekarić, Vladimir Buač, Nikola Petković and Stephen Appiah.
