= Tusko (disambiguation) =

Tusko has been the name of several elephants, most prominently Tusko the circus elephant who was active in USA in the beginning of the 20th century and died in 1933.

Other Tuskos include:

- Tusko in Oregon Zoo, died in 2015
- Tusko in Lincoln Park Zoo (now Oklahoma City Zoo), died in 1962 after an LSD experiment
  - This elephant inspired the song "Tusko" on the album Elephants on Acid by hip hop group Cypress Hill.

== Non-elephants ==
- Lajos Schönfeld, (1901–1924) a footballer commonly known as Tusko
