= Josip Takač =

Yugoslav footballer

Joška Takač
Personal information
- Full name: Josip Takač
- Date of birth: 11 November 1919
- Place of birth: Subotica, Kingdom of Serbs, Croats and Slovenes
- Date of death: 11 October 1991 (aged 71)
- Place of death: Subotica, SR Serbia, SFR Yugoslavia
- Position: Midfielder

Senior career*
Years	Team	Apps	(Gls)
1933–1937	ŽAK Subotica		
1937–1942	UTK Novi Sad	1	(0)
1942–1944	Újvideki AC	5	(0)
1944–1945	ŽAK Subotica	0	(0)
1945–1948	Spartak Subotica	42	(7)
1948–1950	Red Star Belgrade	23	(4)
1951–1956	Spartak Subotica	92	(6)
Total		163	(17)

International career
1948	Yugoslavia Olympic		

Managerial career
- Bačka
- Spartak Subotica
- Sutjeska Nikšić
- 1962-1963: Sloboda Tuzla
- 1963: Iraklis Thessaloniki
Medal record
Men's Football
Representing Yugoslavia
Olympic Games
Silver medal – second place	1948 London	Team
- * Club domestic league appearances and goals

Josip Takač (Serbian Cyrillic: Јосип Такач, Hungarian: Takács József; 11 November 1919 – 11 October 1991) was a Yugoslav footballer.

== Club career ==
Born in Subotica, Takač started playing in 1933 with local ŽAK Subotica. In 1937 he moved to Novi Sad where he joined UTK (Újvidéki Textil SK) a regular competitor in the first league of the Novi Sad Football Subassociation. With Second World War already started and the region occupied by Hungarian authorities, he joins Újvidékí AC in June 1942, the local club that was playing in the Nemzeti Bajnokság I. He played 3 seasons in Hungarian top level. However, in 1944 the season was interrupted as Hungary was losing the war, and Takač left UTC and Novi Sad and returned to his hometown, Subotica, where he rejoined his former team ŽAK.

As the region came back to Yugoslav authorities, ŽAK was merged with other local clubs and formed FK Spartak Subotica in 1945. Takač will become one of its most influential players, and his skills got him to join powerhouse Red Star Belgrade in 1948. In 1950 he will return to Subotica and rejoin Spartak. He will finish his playing career in 1962. During his club career, he won 3 Yugoslav Cup titles.

== International career ==
Takač will be the member of the Yugoslav team that won silver at the 1948 Summer Olympics, but he did not play in any matches.

== Coaching career ==
Later he became a coach and managed Bačka from Bačka Palanka and other clubs.
