= Gavra Avramov =

Serbian politician

Gavra Avramov (Serbian Cyrillic: Гавра Аврамов; born 1956) is a politician in Serbia. He served in the Assembly of Vojvodina from 2012 to 2020 as a member of the Social Democratic Party of Serbia (SDPS).

== Private career ==
Avramov is from Ravno Selo in the municipality of Vrbas, Vojvodina. He is a graduated mechanical engineer. Avramov was the director of Novkabel for a number of years (having first been appointed on an interim basis in 2003) and later became director of the company Monet G.

== Politician ==
The SDPS contested the 2012 Vojvodina provincial election on an electoral list led by the Socialist Party of Serbia. Avramov was given the ninth position on the list and was elected when it won exactly nine mandates. The election was won by the Democratic Party and its allies, and the SDPS served in opposition for the next four years.

For the 2016 provincial election, the SDPS joined the electoral alliance of the Serbian Progressive Party. Avramov received the thirtieth position on the Progressive-led Aleksandar Vučić – Serbia Is Winning list and was re-elected when it won a majority victory with sixty-three out of 120 mandates. He served as a government supporter for the next four years and did not seek re-election in 2020.
