= Dorog =

- Town
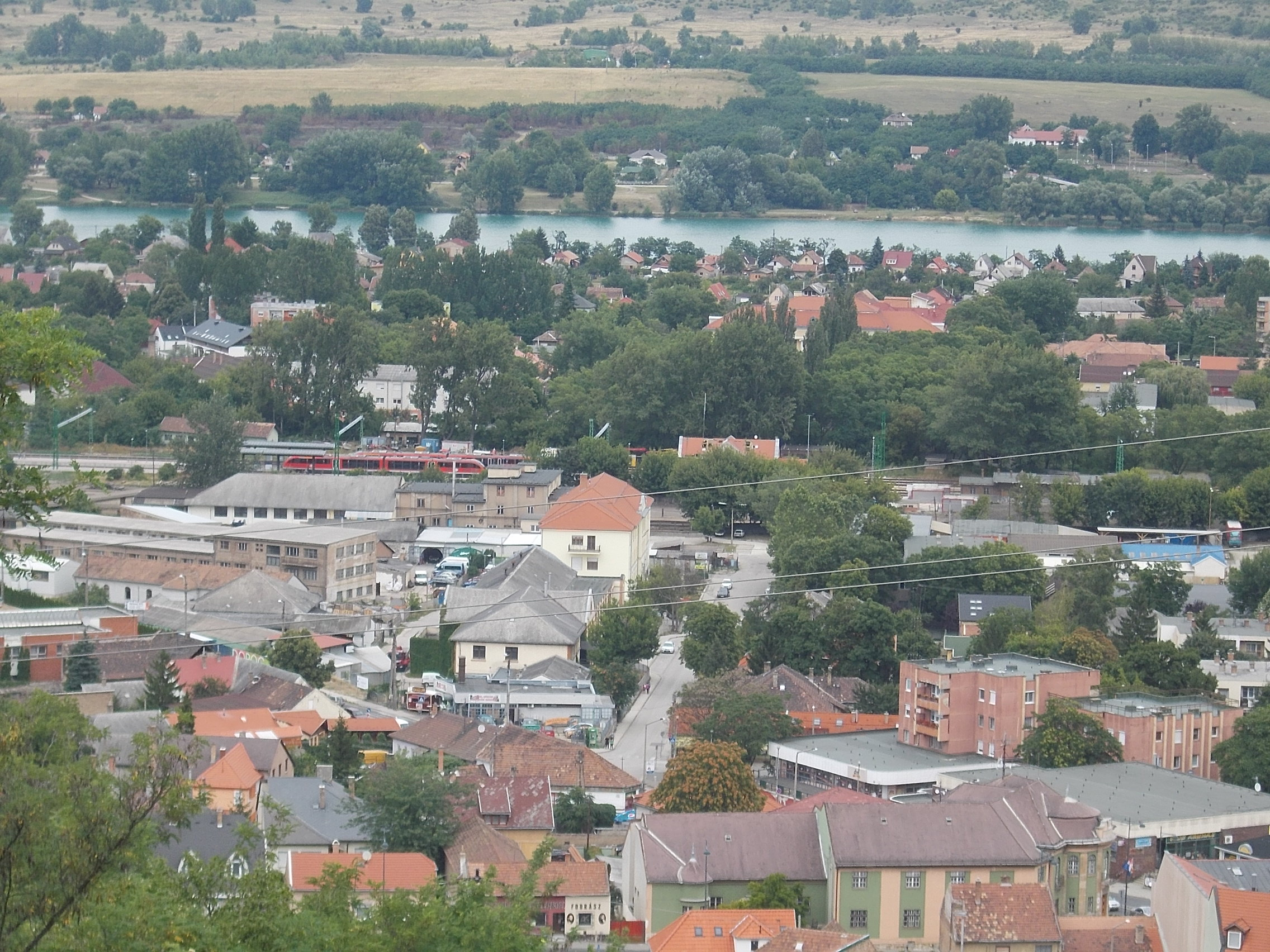

- Flag Coat of arms

- Location of Dorog in Hungary
- Coordinates: 47.7194°N 18.7292°E
- Country: Hungary
- County: Komárom-Esztergom
- District: Esztergom

Government
  - Mayor: János Tittmann Independent

Area
  - Total: 11.54 km^{2} (4.46 sq mi)

Population (2012)
  - Total: 11,996
  - Density: 1,040/km^{2} (2,692/sq mi)
- Time zone: UTC+1 (CET)
  - Summer (DST): UTC+2 (CEST)
- Postal code: 2510
- Area code: (+36) 33
- Website: https://www.dorog.hu/

Dorog (German: Drostdorf) is a small town in Komárom-Esztergom County, Hungary. It lies 38 km (24 mi) north-west from the center of Budapest.

== Etymology ==
The name comes from Slavic drugъ (drug) - a partner, comrade, "brother".

== History ==
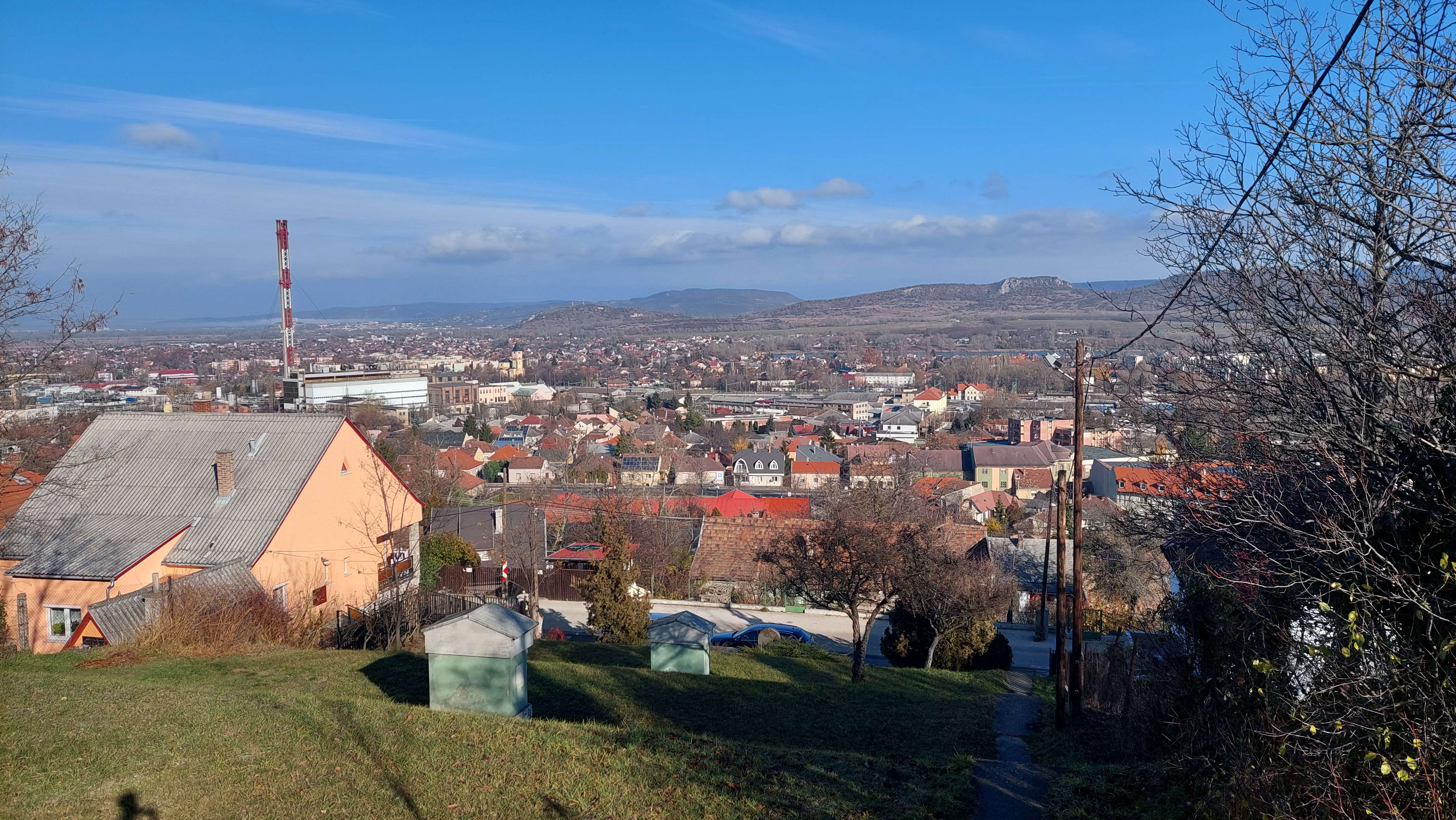
North of Dorog with the power plant

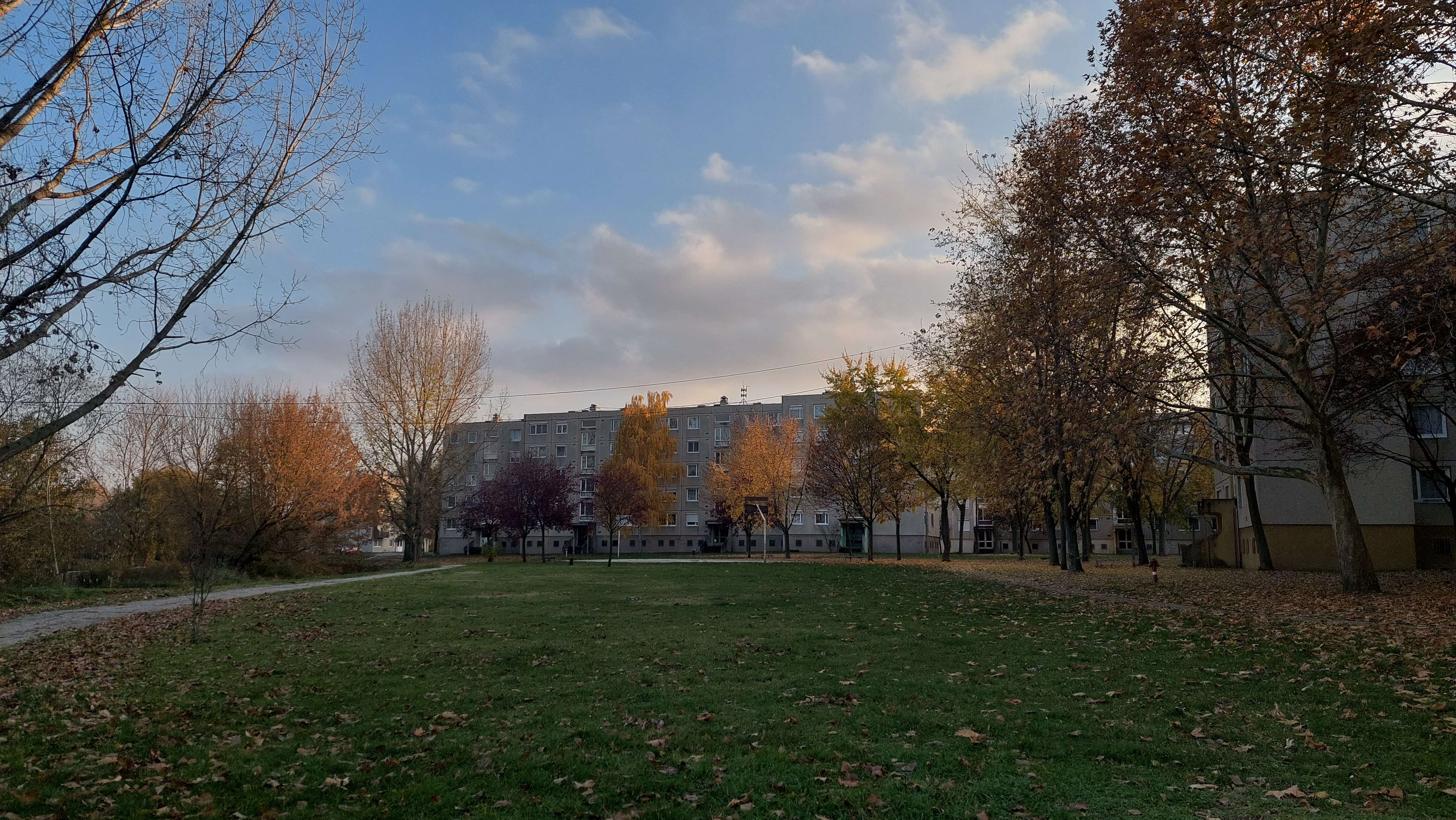
Housing estate

The valley between the Pilis and Gerecse mountains has been inhabited since the Neolithic. A Roman military road westwards from Aquincum passed by the present-day town of Dorog, where Roman dwellings with floor heating have been found, along with conduits, graves and milestones. When Hungary's kings resided at Esztergom in the 11th and 12th centuries, Dorog was where the cooks of the castle lodged. Roads from all directions met here in the Middle Ages, and the Chapter of Esztergom had the right to levy custom duties. The name, which appears in the form Durug, Drug and Durugd, is first mentioned in an extant document in 1181.

The medieval settlement, destroyed in the Ottoman invasion, remained uninhabited from 1542 until 1649. German settlers then arrived in three waves, followed by Hungarians again. Dorog in the 18th century became a centre of communications again. Regular 19th-century visitors to the posting inn on the Buda–Vienna road included philologist Ferenc Kazinczy, statesman István Széchenyi and magnate Ferenc Wesselényi. New houses and streets sprang up round the baroque Roman Catholic church built in 1767–1775.

The first written contract on mining coal at Dorog, dating from 1845, was drawn up between the Capter of Esztergom and the colliery managers Ferenc Wasshuber and József János Jülke. Thereafter, many great engineers became involved in developing the Dorog mines, including Vilmos Zsigmondy, the geologist Miksa Hantken, and the mining engineers Henrik Drasche and Sándor Schmidt, who opened up and directed exploitation of richer and richer seams. Dorog, around the start of the 20th century, was a major mining centre, connected by rail (originally HÉV) with Budapest and by canal with the Danube. In 1906, Dorog's power plant was constructed (which was rebuilt in the 1980's with a 120-metre (390 ft) high chimney). In 1900 Dorog had 1966 inhabitants (1369 Germans, 477 Hungarians, 55 Slovaks).

Budapest's factories and population needed more and more coal in the interwar period, so Dorog developed rapidly. Several housing colonies for the immigrant miners were built in the 1920's and 1930's. So were a large worker's hostel, a new Catholic church, a Reformed church in Transylvanian style (which was constructed by Transylvanian coalminers who moved there after the Treaty of Trianon), two new schools, a kindergarten, a modern hospital, a mine manager's club, mine manager's residences, a town hall, a World War I memorial and a recreation ground. Most of these were designed by the engineer Zoltán Gáthy.

Some 300 men of Dorog lost their lives in the Second World War. A few years after the war, many Germans were expelled. During the socialist era, Dorog became a typical socialist town with prefabricated blocks of flats. The mines gradually closed, so the government planted several factories (Gedeon Richter company, Hungaroton record plant, a machine factory). Dorog became a town in 1984, the industrial park was established in 1999.

== Economy ==
There are several factories in Dorog, including:

- Panasonic Corp. (solar cell manufacturing) (closed down)
- Gedeon Richter Plc. (medicine)
- Novoprint Corp. (printing complex)
- Dorog-Esztergom Hőerőmű Ltd. (power plant)

== Population ==
Historical population
| Year | Pop. | ±% |
|---|---|---|
| 1850 | 540 | — |
| 1857 | 837 | +55.0% |
| 1870 | 1,161 | +38.7% |
| 1880 | 1,163 | +0.2% |
| 1890 | 1,363 | +17.2% |
| 1900 | 1,966 | +44.2% |
| 1910 | 1,949 | −0.9% |
| 1920 | 3,943 | +102.3% |
| 1930 | 5,863 | +48.7% |
| 1941 | 8,182 | +39.6% |
| 1949 | 8,855 | +8.2% |
| 1960 | 9,994 | +12.9% |
| 1970 | 10,744 | +7.5% |
| 1980 | 11,844 | +10.2% |
| 1990 | 12,798 | +8.1% |
| 2001 | 12,609 | −1.5% |
| 2011 | 12,199 | −3.3% |

Ethnic groups (2001 census):

- Hungarians — 95.3%
- Germans — 4.2%
- Other — 0.5%

Religions (2001 census):

- Roman Catholic — 57.4%
- Calvinist — 8.9%
- Lutheran — 0.8%
- Other Christian — 2%
- Atheist — 19.1%
- No answer, unknown — 11.8%

== Traffic and transport ==
Roads 10, 111 and 117 and the Budapest–Esztergom suburban railway line (with Siemens Desiro trains), all cross the town. The main street was rebuilt in 2006. Commuter bus no. 800 (with Volvo 7700A buses) connects the town with Árpád híd metro station. It runs every 20 or 30 minutes on a typical weekday.

== Notable residents ==
- Jenő Buzánszky, footballer
- Gyula Grosics (1926-2014), footballer
- Imre Kozma (1940-), Roman Catholic priest, founder of the Hungarian Charity Service of the Order of Malta, patron of East German refugees arriving to Hungary in 1988-89
- Nándor Hargitai (1919-2006), footballer
- Péter Bacsa (1970-), wrestler
- Márta Megyeri (1952-), handball player
- Lajos Szűcs (1943-), footballer
- József Szabó (1956-), footballer

== Twin towns – sister cities ==
Dorog is twinned with:

- Feliceni, Romania
- Marienberg, Germany
- Wendlingen, Germany
- Žirany, Slovakia
- Tetovo, North Macedonia
