= Edvard Platz =

Yugoslav-Hungarian footballer

Edo Plac
Personal information
- Full name: Edvard Platz
- Date of birth: 15 May 1911
- Place of birth: Sarajevo, Austro-Hungary
- Position: Goalkeeper

Youth career
- 1925–1926: NAK Novi Sad

Senior career*
Years	Team	Apps	(Gls)
1926–1932	NAK Novi Sad		
1932–1933	Juda Makabi		
1933–1934	Vojvodina		
1934–1937	SK Jugoslavija	13	(0)
1937–1941	Vojvodina		
1941–1944	Újvidékí AC	25	(0)

Managerial career
- 1942–1944: Újvidékí AC (coach/player)
- Srem
- Bačka
- Hajduk Kula
- * Club domestic league appearances and goals

Edvard "Edo" Platz (born 15 May 1911) was a Yugoslav-Hungarian football goalkeeper.

== Playing career ==
Platz was born into a family of German-Jewish origin in Sarajevo, Bosnia and Herzegovina, on 15 May 1911. During the Austro-Hungarian rule in Bosnia and Herzegovina, young Platz moved to Novi Sad. While in high school he started to play for the local youth team of NAK Novi Sad. Initially he played in a forward position, but over time moved to the goalkeeper position at the direction of his coach. Platz was only 15 years old when he made his debut.

Later, after a brief stint at Juda Makabi, he signed with FK Vojvodina where he was described by the press as being the best goalkeeper Vojvodina had in the period between the wars. His performance attracted the attention of major teams from the capital and in 1937 he joined SK Jugoslavija. His main goal was to get a call from the Yugoslavia national team, but in Yugoslavia he had tough competition from the already well-established and highly reputed Franjo Glazer.

Playing for three seasons, mostly as a reserve, he managed to make thirteen appearances for the Yugoslav First League, then left Belgrade and returned to Vojvodina, where he was welcomed back. In 1938 he was named team captain in recognition of being their most balanced and well-rounded player, and the one most capable of dealing with referees and opposing players. In the following years, Vojvodina created a so-called Millioners team with Platz as main goalkeeper and captain, playing seasons which Vojvodina supporters remembered for decades to come.

At the start of the Second World War in Yugoslavia, Nazi Germany invaded the kingdom and completely rearranged borders and territories. Novi Sad became part of the Hungarian occupation of Yugoslav territories. A group of Vojvodina players was forced to join the NAK during the period of Hungarian occupation to avoid problems, including being sent to concentration camps, and Platz was among them, together with Ivan Medarić (Iván Mézes), Jovan Marjanović (János Máriás), Veljko Avramović (Velykó Avar), Jovica Jovanović (György Jánosi) and Lazar Živković (Lázár Zsoldos). This was especially crucial for Platz because of his Jewish descent. During the occupation period, playing as Újvidéki AC, they played three seasons in the Hungarian Championship from 1941 to 1944. During the first two seasons they had mid-table results, finishing 12th in 1941–42 and 11th in 1942–43, but in 1943–44 they improved and finished in 6th place. The 1944–45 season was abandoned after only four match days, with the UAC having played only 2 games. Because of his experience, Platz was made player-coach in the first half of the 1942–43 season and the first 6 rounds of the 1943–44 and 1944 seasons.

== Managerial career ==
At the end of the war, Novi Sad returned to Yugoslavia and the NAK was disbanded. Having already gained coaching experience, Platz decided to accept a coaching position at several Yugoslav clubs, including FK Srem, FK Bačka from Bačka Palanka, FK Vardar, and FK Hajduk Kula.
