= Žirany =

Village and municipality in Slovakia

Žirany Zsére
- Municipality
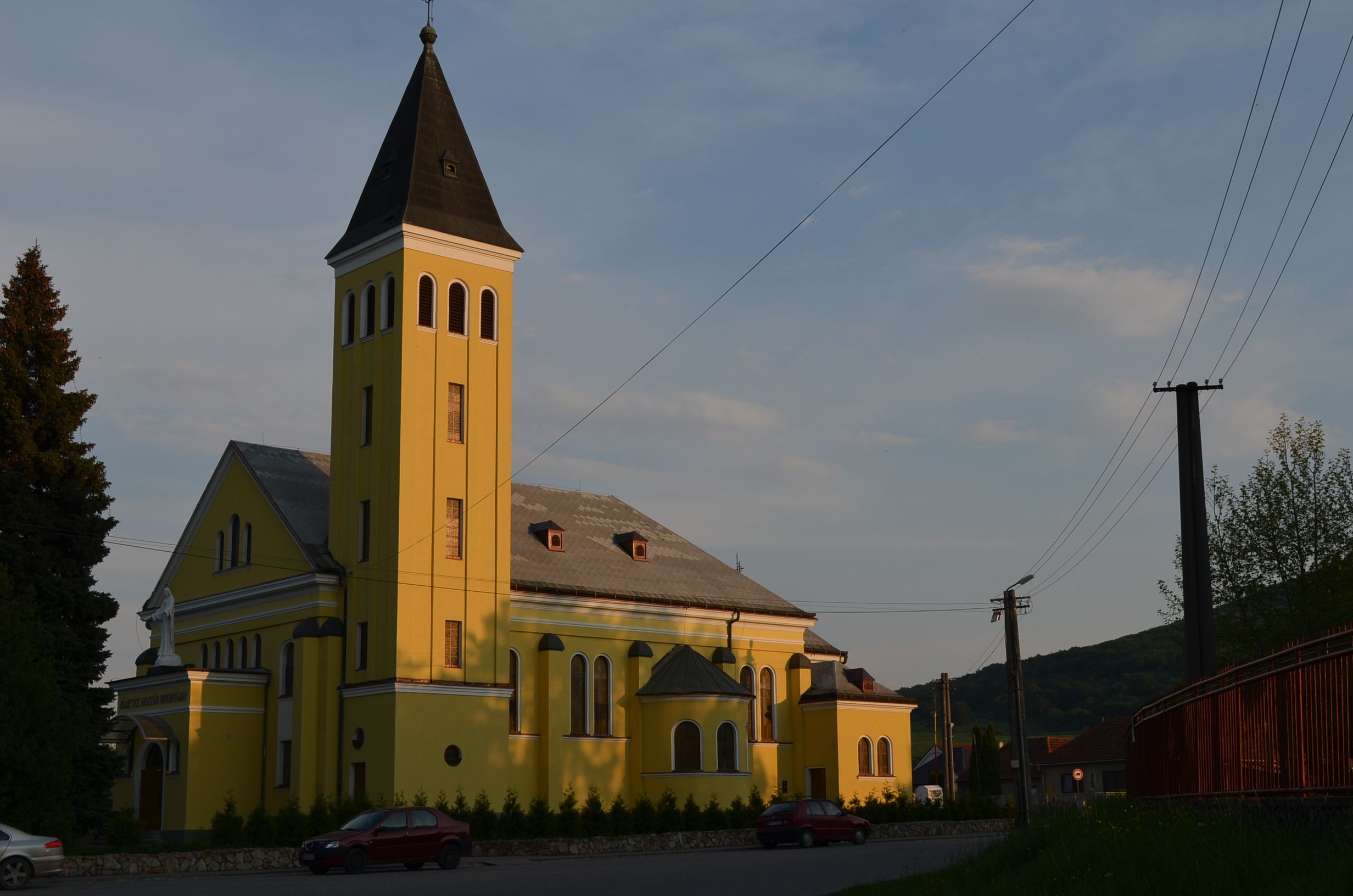
- Church of Saint Nicholas

- Flag

- Location of Žirany in the Nitra Region Location of Žirany in Slovakia
- Coordinates: 48.38°N 18.18°E
- Country: Slovakia
- Region: Nitra Region
- District: Nitra District
- First mentioned: 1113

Area
  - Total: 15.55 km^{2} (6.00 sq mi)
- Elevation: 251 m (823 ft)

Population (2025)
  - Total: 1,322
- Time zone: UTC+1 (CET)
  - Summer (DST): UTC+2 (CEST)
- Postal code: 951 74
- Area code: +421 37
- Vehicle registration plate (until 2022): NR
- Website: www.zirany.eu

Žirany (Hungarian: Zsére, Hungarian pronunciation: [ˈʒeːrɛ]) is a village and municipality in the Nitra District in western central Slovakia, in the Nitra Region.

== History ==
In historical records the village was first mentioned in 1113.

== Geography ==
The municipality lies at an altitude of 251 metres (823 ft) and covers an area of 15.55 km^{2} (6.00 sq mi) (2025).

== Population ==
Population statistic (10 years)
Year	1995	2005	2015	2025
Count	1250	1371	1386	1322
Difference		+9.68%	+1.09%	−4.61%

Population statistic
Year	2024	2025
Count	1346	1322
Difference		−1.78%

It has a population of 1322 people (31 December 2025).

=== Ethnicity ===
Census 2021 (1+ %)
Ethnicity	Number	Fraction
Slovak	815	59.92%
Hungarian	542	39.85%
Not found out	67	4.92%
Total	1360	

In year 2021 was 1360 people by ethnicity 815 as Slovak, 542 as Hungarian, 67 as Not found out, 10 as Czech, 6 as Other, 2 as Russian, 2 as Polish, 1 as Romani and 1 as Greek.

Note on population: The difference values of population numbers in the table "Population statistic" and in the sections "Ethnicity" & "Religion" is caused by the use of various statistical methods.

=== Religion ===
Census 2021 (1+ %)
Religion	Number	Fraction
Roman Catholic Church	1030	75.74%
None	197	14.49%
Not found out	69	5.07%
Total	1360	

In year 2021 was 1360 people by religion 1030 from Roman Catholic Church, 197 from None, 69 from Not found out, 9 from Church of Jesus Christ of Latter-day Saints, 8 from Other and not ascertained christian church, 8 from Other, 7 from Greek Catholic Church, 7 from Evangelical Church, 6 from Christian Congregations in Slovakia, 6 from Apostolic Church, 4 from Calvinist Church, 4 from Ad hoc movements, 3 from Paganism and natural spirituality, 1 from Old Catholic Church and 1 from Hinduism.

== Sister cities ==
- - Dorog, Hungary
