= Ivan Medarić =

Croatian footballer

Personal information
- Date of birth: 7 November 1912
- Place of birth: Sisak, Austro-Hungary
- Date of death: 30 November 1990 (aged 78)
- Place of death: Zagreb, SFR Yugoslavia
- Position: Midfielder

Senior career*
Years	Team	Apps	(Gls)
1927–1932	Segesta Sisak		
1932–1936	HAŠK Zagreb		
1936–1937	Građanski Zagreb	22	(10)
1937–1940	HAŠK Zagreb		
1940–1941	Vojvodina		
1941–1943	NAK Novi Sad	58	(17)
1945–1946	Dinamo Zagreb	3	(1)
1946–1947	Željezničar Sarajevo	14	(7)
1947–1948	Naprijed Sisak		

International career
1937–1939	Yugoslavia	3	(0)

Managerial career
- 1947: Željezničar Sarajevo
- Naprijed Sisak
- Lokomotiva Zagreb
- * Club domestic league appearances and goals

Ivan "Ivica" Medarić (7 November 1912 – 30 November 1990) was a Croatian footballer who played in top league clubs in Yugoslavia and in the Yugoslavia national team.

== Playing career ==
=== Club ===
Born in Sisak, Austro-Hungary (nowadays Croatia), he begin his career at local club HNK Segesta. In 1935, along his teammate Jozo Kovačević, they moved to Zagreb and were signed by HAŠK. A year later Medarić signed with HŠK Građanski Zagreb playing back then in the Yugoslav First League. In his first season with Građanski, he won the national title, but a year later he was back with HAŠK, and was part of HAŠK team that won the 1937–38 Yugoslav Football Championship. He won 2 Yugoslav championships in a row with two different clubs.

He played with HAŠK until 1940 when he moved to Novi Sad and joined FK Vojvodina. He was part of Vojvodina so called "Millioners" team that finished third in the 1940–41 Serbian League and was qualified for the final phase of the Yugoslav League, however due to the start of the Second World War the championship was cancelled. In 1941 the city of Novi Sad was occupied by Hungary. FK Vojvodina stopped their activities. Medarić for some time continued playing football with NAK Novi Sad, then known as Újvideki AC and playing in the Hungarian championship. Medarić was in the group of Vojvodina players that joined NAK, among them there was goalkeeper Plac, Marjanović, Avramović, Jovanović and Živković, in order to avoid problems or even being sent to labour (concentration) camps. Medarić was in danger because he had been a member of the Yugoslav Communist Party since he was 20, and he has already been imprisoned for illegal activities during the pre-World War II period in the Kingdom of Yugoslavia while he was a veterinary student in Zagreb. So in 1943 he left NAK and joined the Yugoslav Partisans in their fight against Axis forces. During the time he played with Ujvideki AC in the Hungarian championship, he was in the Hungarian press by the magyrized name of Mézes Iván.

Immediately after the war, in 1945, he was among the first players of newly founded NK Dinamo Zagreb. He entered into the history of Dinamo as the first ever scorer of the club, when he scored the first goal in the match against the team of the Yugoslav Air Force, a 2:0 win, played on 23 June 1945.

He later played one season with FK Željezničar Sarajevo, before retiring in his home-town club HNK Segesta, known then as Naprijed.

=== International ===
Medarić was a right-winger, and besides 18 appearances for the team of Zagreb football subassociation, he played one game for the B team of Yugoslavia.

He made his senior debut for Yugoslavia in an October 1937 Neighbours Cup match away against Czechoslovakia and earned a total of 3 caps, scoring no goals. His final international was an October 1939 friendly against Nazi Germany.

== Managerial career ==
After retiring, he was a coach for some time at Naprijed and at NK Lokomotiva.

He was condecorated by the Yugoslav Football Association, and has lived in Zagreb until his death, on 30 November 1990.

== Honours ==
Građanski Zagreb

- Yugoslav First League: 1936–37

HAŠK

- Yugoslav First League: 1937–38
