= Virgil Popescu =

Romanian footballer and coach (1916–1989)

Personal information
- Date of birth: 1 December 1916
- Place of birth: Zlatna, Kingdom of Romania
- Date of death: 15 February 1989 (aged 72)
- Place of death: Kovin, Yugoslavia
- Position: Defender

Senior career*
Years	Team	Apps	(Gls)
1938–1941	Vojvodina		
1943–1944	Juventus Bucharest	7	(0)
1945–1948	Partizan	17	(0)
Total		24	(0)

Managerial career
- 1963–1964: Rijeka
- 1964–1965: Legia Warsaw
- 1965–1966: Partizan (assistant)
- 1966–1967: St. Gallen
- 1968–1970: Morocco Olympic
- 1970: Wormatia Worms
- 1970–1972: KAC Kénitra
- 1972–1973: JSK Kabylie
- * Club domestic league appearances and goals

Virgil Popescu (1 December 1916 – 15 February 1989) was a Romanian football player and coach. In Yugoslavia, he was known as Stanislav Popesku.

== Career ==
Popescu was born in 1916 during the First World War, in the Transylvanian town of Zlatna, back then within Austro-Hungary, nowadays in Romania. In 1918, at the end of the war, his parents moved to the newly formed Kingdom of Serbs, Croats and Slovenes, later renamed Yugoslavia. He began playing for Novi Sad club FK Vojvodina and was part of Vojvodina's so called Millionaires team at the beginning of the 1940s. He played with Vojvodina in the Novi Sad subassociation league in the 1938–39 season and then in the Serbian League between 1939 and 1941.

The Second World War started in Yugoslavia in 1941. Popescu was at the time attending the Commercial Academy in Belgrade, and by 6 April 1941, he was a second lieutenant defending the country against German forces. It took four days, on 10 April, when he was captured by Axis forces near Belgrade and taken to Romania to a concentration camp in Turnu Măgurele. After spending two years in the camp, in 1943 he caught the attention of Juventus Bucharest boss Cezar Popescu who got the news that this 27-year-old defender who had played in Serbia was in the camp 8. By explaining how Virgil Popescu was a Romanian and as such a German ally, he managed to release him from the camp and brought him to the team. He made his debut for Bucharest side Juventus on 6 October, in a match against Craiova. He made 7 appearances for Juventus in the 1943–44 Romanian Divizia A. However, not very long afterwards he entered the club offices and said that he had to leave to fight alongside Yugoslav Partisans and Marshal Tito in freeing Yugoslavia, and club officials accepted his will, so he returned to Yugoslavia and joined the resistance.

He fought the Germans, and at the end of the war, in 1945, he was among the founders of Belgrade-based FK Partizan which became one of the major powers of Yugoslav football. His passion for Serbia was such that he adopted a Serbian name, Stanislav. He played with Partizan in the Yugoslav First League for two seasons. He played a total of 65 matches and scored once for Partizan, of which 17 matches were in the league. Earlier, he played with SAP Vojvodina in the 1945 Yugoslav Football Tournament. With Partizan he won the first Yugoslav post-World War II championship.

He later became a coach. He coached Miroslav Blažević at NK Rijeka in the Yugoslav First League. and was the assistant manager to Abdulah Gegić at Partizan when they reached the 1966 European Cup Final. He also coached Polish side Legia Warsaw in the season 1964–65. Popescu then managed Swiss team St. Gallen and Wormatia Worms in Germany before moving to Morocco and Algeria to help develop football in those countries, there he coached the Moroccan Olympic side and KAC Kénitra. In the 1972–73 season, he was at the helm of Algerian side JS Kabylie, with whom he won the championship.

== Honours ==
=== Player ===
Vojvodina

- Novi Sad subassociation league: 1939, 1940

Partizan

- Yugoslav First League: 1946–47
- Yugoslav Cup: 1947

=== Manager ===
Legia Warsaw

- Polish Cup: 1964–65

JS Kabylie

- Algerian League: 1972–73
