= Nikoslav Bjegović =

Serbian footballer

Personal information
- Full name: Nikoslav Bjegović
- Date of birth: 16 November 1967 (age 58)
- Place of birth: Gospić, SR Croatia, SFR Yugoslavia
- Height: 1.81 m (5 ft 11 in)
- Position: Defender

Senior career*
Years	Team	Apps	(Gls)
1989–1991	Partizan	0	(0)
1991–1992	Radnički Kragujevac		
1992–1993	Palilulac Beograd		
1993–1995	OFK Beograd	41	(0)
1995–1997	Vojvodina	41	(2)
1997–2000	Red Star Belgrade	52	(0)
2000	Beijing Guoan	18	(1)
2001	Luzern	8	(0)
Total		160	(3)

International career
1998	FR Yugoslavia	1	(0)
- * Club domestic league appearances and goals

Nikoslav Bjegović (Serbian Cyrillic: Никослав Бјеговић; born 16 November 1967) is a Serbian retired footballer who played as a defender.

== Club career ==
After failing to make an impact at Partizan, Bjegović played for OFK Beograd and Vojvodina, securing himself a move to Red Star Belgrade in 1997. He helped the club win the FR Yugoslavia Cup in the 1998–99 season. In early 2000, Bjegović moved abroad to China to join Beijing Guoan. He also briefly played for Swiss club Luzern before retiring.

== International career ==
At international level, Bjegović was capped once for FR Yugoslavia in December 1998, coming on as a substitute in a friendly against Israel.

== Honours ==
Red Star Belgrade

- FR Yugoslavia Cup: 1998–99
