= Konstantin Ognjanović =

Serbian footballer

Personal information
- Date of birth: 5 May 1973 (age 53)
- Place of birth: Belgrade, Yugoslavia
- Height: 1.84 m (6 ft 0 in)
- Position: Forward

Senior career*
Years	Team	Apps	(Gls)
1991–1992	Budućnost Podgorica	26	(5)
1993–1994	Red Star Belgrade	13	(4)
1994–1995	Zemun	16	(1)
1995–1996	Red Star Belgrade	1	(0)
1996–1997	Vojvodina	5	(1)
1998–1999	Milicionar	15	(6)
1999	OFK Beograd	9	(2)
2000	Greuther Fürth	1	(0)
2000–2001	Union Berlin	2	(0)
Total		88	(19)
- * Club domestic league appearances and goals

Konstantin Ognjanović (Serbian Cyrillic: Константин Огњановић; born 5 May 1973) is a Serbian former footballer who played as a forward.

During his career he played for FK Budućnost Podgorica, Red Star Belgrade, FK Zemun, FK Vojvodina, FK Milicionar, OFK Beograd, mostly in First League of FR Yugoslavia, and since January 2000, in Germany, with Greuther Fürth, playing in the 2. Bundesliga, and 1. FC Union Berlin in the Regionalliga Nord.
