= Ravno Selo =

Ravno Selo Равно Село (Serbian)
- Village (Selo)
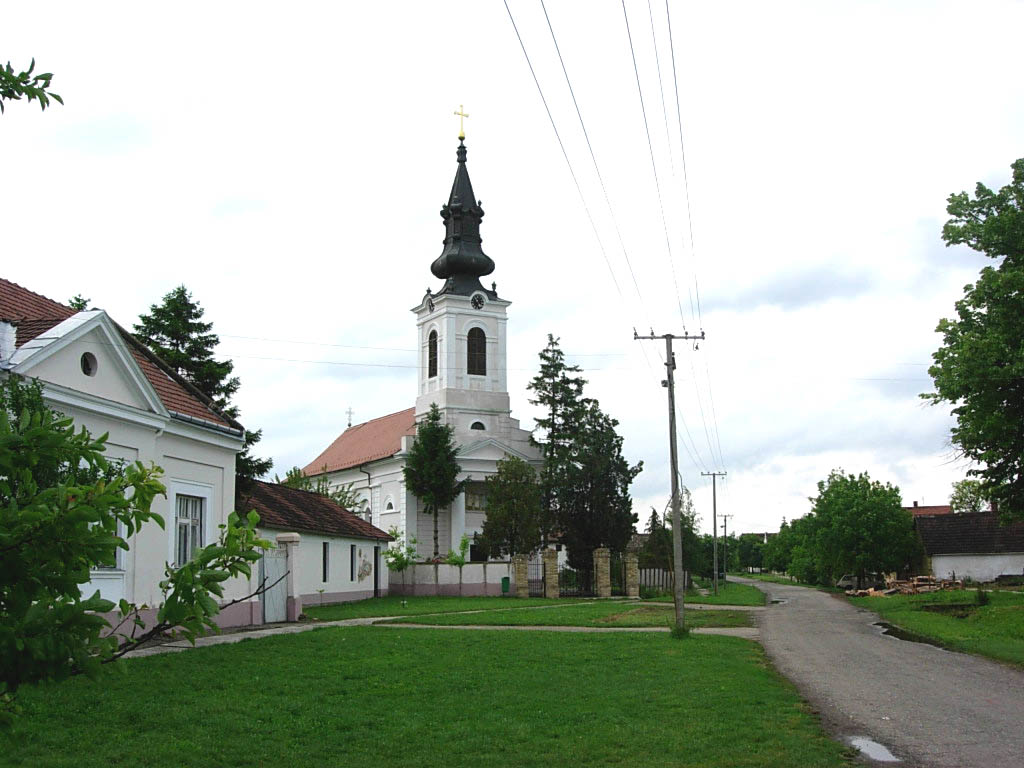
- The Orthodox Church.

- Location within Vojvodina Location within Serbia Location within Europe
- Coordinates: 45°27′1″N 19°37′9″E
- Country: Serbia
- Province: Vojvodina
- Region: Bačka (Podunavlje)
- District: South Bačka
- Municipality: Vrbas

Population (2022)
  - Total: 3,478
- Time zone: UTC+1 (CET)
  - Summer (DST): UTC+2 (CEST)

Ravno Selo (Serbian Cyrillic: Равно Село, pronounced [râːʋnoː sělo]; Hungarian: Sóvé) is a village in Serbia. It is situated in the municipality of Vrbas, in the South Bačka District, Vojvodina province. The village has a Serb ethnic majority and its population numbers 2,701 people according to the 202 census.

== Name ==
In Serbian, the village is known as Ravno Selo (Равно Село), in German as Alt-Schowe, and in Hungarian as Ósóvé. Other Serbian names used for the village are: Ravno (Равно), Stare Šove (Старе Шове), and Šove (Шове).

== History ==
The village was first recorded in the end of the 15th century (between 1484 and 1502). During Ottoman rule (16th-17th century), the village of Šove was populated by Serbs. In 1786, Germans settled in the village as well. In 1820, population of Šove numbered 2,598 inhabitants, of whom 1,643 were Serbs. In 1893, the population of the village numbered 2,136 inhabitants, including 1,436 Serbs, 653 Germans, 15 Hungarians, and 32 others.

== Historical population ==
- 1961: 4,378
- 1971: 3,814
- 1981: 3,636
- 1991: 3,579
- 2002: 3,478

== Notable people ==
- Jožef Velker (1913–1995), former footballer
- Lazar Ristovski (b. 1952), actor

== Film festival ==
On 23–25 June 2017 actor and producer Lazar Ristovski, who was born in the region, organized the first edition of the international Ravno Selo Film Festival dedicated to the first and second film of young directors. Since 2017 the Ravno Selo Film Festival is held annually. Festival director is Petar Ristovski.

== See also ==
- List of places in Serbia
- List of cities, towns and villages in Vojvodina

== Sources ==
Ćurčić, Slobodan (1996). Broj stanovnika Vojvodine. Novi Sad: Matica Srpska.
