= Lajos Schönfeld =

Hungarian footballer (1901–1924)

Tusko
Personal information
- Full name: Lajos Schönfeld
- Date of birth: 7 September 1901
- Place of birth: Szeged, Austria-Hungary
- Date of death: 24 June 1925 (aged 23)
- Place of death: Belgrade, Kingdom of Serbs, Croats and Slovenes
- Position: Goalkeeper

Youth career
- Szegedi TC

Senior career*
Years	Team	Apps	(Gls)
1916–1917	Szegedi TC		
1917–1918	Ferencváros		
1918–1920	NAK Novi Sad		
1920–1921	Szegedi TC		
1921–1922	Vojvodina		
1922–1925	BSK Belgrade		
- * Club domestic league appearances and goals

Lajos Schönfeld, commonly known as Tusko (born 7 September 1901 in Szeged – died 25 June 1924 in Belgrade) was a Hungarian football goalkeeper.

He was one of the most influential players of BSK Belgrade in the early 1920s and is specially remembered for his die-hard attitude in the pitch.

He began his career in Szeged where he played with Szegedi T.C. mostly in the youth team and occasionally as reserve in the first squad. until 1917 when he joins Ferencvárosi TC where he plays until the end of the First World War. In 1918 because of the hard conditions in his hometown, he leaves Szeged and moved to Novi Sad in the Kingdom of Yugoslavia and joins NAK Novi Sad. It is during this period that he travels as a guest with BSK to a tournament in Dalmatia, however he returned to NAK, and shortly after, in 1921, he moved back to Szeged. He rejoined his former club and became the main goalkeeper. His noticed performances made him a call for an exhibition match played in 1921 between the selections of Budapest against the Hungarian Province. This match fielded what were considered the best players in Hungary by that time, divided in two teams, the ones based in the capital Budapest against the ones playing in the rest of the country, with Tusko playing for the second one, as he was based in Szeged. That year he returned to the Novi Sad and joined FK Vojvodina where he stayed during the rest of the 1921 season. and the 1922. That year, despite the interest of numerous clubs, he opted to move to Belgrade and signed with BSK, a team he already knew from the tournament he was a guest in few years earlier, and where he will become one of the main players of the Yugoslav Championship which started in 1923.

After two seasons, he became an idol in Belgrade and during 1923 was often named as the best goalkeeper in the country. However, in 1924 he suffered a heavy kidney injury in a clash with an opponent forward in a friendly match between the city selection of Belgrade, for whom he played, and the selection of Lower Austria region. After spending a couple of days in hospital and two surgeries he died. The main local sports newspaper Sport had extensive coverage of the event and concluded the report with the following sentence: "He died like a hero and was buried as a small sports King."

As a result, the Belgrade Football Subassociation created a fund named after him in order to financially support the injured footballers.

He was known in Yugoslav media in his Serbian language name version as Lajoš Šenfeld Tusko, or in Cyrillic as Лajoш Шeнфeлд Tуcкo.

== External sources ==
- pag. 32 from the book "Bsk - Jugoslavija Sećanja Na Prvi Beogradski Večiti Derbi" (English: "Bsk - Jugoslavija memories of Belgrade´s first Eternal derby") by Mr. Živko M. Bojanić.
