= Nándor Hargitai =

Hungarian footballer

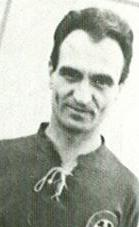

Personal information
- Date of birth: 20 October 1919
- Place of birth: Mátraszele, Hungary
- Date of death: 11 September 2006 (aged 86)
- Place of death: Esztergom, Hungary
- Position: Midfielder

Youth career
- 1933–1936: Dorogi

Senior career*
Years	Team	Apps	(Gls)
1936–1937	Dorogi	25	(5)
1937–1938	Ferencváros	1	(0)
1938–1939	Phöbus	15	(1)
1940–1943	NAK Novi Sad		
194x–1949	Viscosa		
1949–1955	Dorogi	131	(1)
- * Club domestic league appearances and goals

Nándor Hargitai also known as Nándor Szirmai (20 October 1919 – 11 September 2006) was a Hungarian football midfielder.

== Career ==
Born in Mátraszele, he begin his career at the youth team of Dorogi FC. He debuted at age 17 for Dorogi senior team in the 1936–37 season but a year later he was signing with Ferencvárosi TC. He made only one appearance for Ferencváros in the 1937–38 season when they won the Hungarian championship. While playing with Ferencváros he changed his name to Nándor Szirmai. In the 1938–39 season, he joined another Hungarian top-flight club, Phöbus FC. In 1940 he moved to Yugoslav club NAK Novi Sad. However, after only one season, and with Second World War on their way, the city of Novi Sad was occupied by Hungarian forces, and NAK begin to be known as Újvideki AC and play in the Hungarian championship. After the war he played with Hungarian side Viscosa SE until 1949 when he returned to Dorogi FC, now known as Dorogi Bányász and had just returned to top-flight, and played there until 1955 making a total of 131 league appearances and scoring once. He reached the 1953 Hungarian Cup final.

He died on 11 September 2006, in Esztergom, Hungary.

== Honours ==
Ferencváros

- Hungarian championship: 1937–38

Dorogi Bányász

- Hungarian Cup finalist: 1952
