= Jožef Velker =

Serbian footballer (1912–1995)

Personal information
- Full name: Josip Velker
- Date of birth: 5 December 1912
- Place of birth: Šove, Kingdom of Serbia
- Date of death: 29 November 1995 (aged 82)
- Place of death: Willoughby, Ohio, United States
- Position: Midfielder

Senior career*
Years	Team	Apps	(Gls)
1931–1937	NAK Novi Sad		
1937-1941	Vojvodina		
1941–1944	Újvidéki		
1946–1950	Sloga Novi Sad		
1951	Vojvodina		

International career
1938–1940	Yugoslavia	3	(0)
- * Club domestic league appearances and goals

Jožef Velker (Serbian Cyrillic: Јожеф Велкер, German: Josef Welker, Hungarian: József Welker; 5 December 1912 – 29 November 1995) was a Yugoslav football player active between the late 1930s and early 1950s. A Yugoslavia international, he is considered one of the most important players in the history of FK Vojvodina.

== Early life ==
Welker was born into a wealthy landowner family in 1912 in Šove (Schowe; today known as Ravno Selo), a small town mostly populated by ethnic Germans in the region of Vojvodina, at the time part of Austro-Hungary, today in northern Serbia. In the late 1920s he went to college in Novi Vrbas and has soon begin to show his passion towards football. While visiting an agricultural fair in Budapest in 1929 he had the chance to assist to his first football match played between Hungary and his country, the Kingdom of Yugoslavia.

== NAK Novi Sad ==
In 1931, Velker met an American woman named Cathy, who was visiting her family in Šover, and they were subsequently married. In same year he was spotted and signed by scouts of NAK Novi Sad. FK Vojvodina, the city rivals, pursued the new star of NAK for six years. He was appreciated by Vojvodina fans for his fairness in play. In Autumn 1937, Velker trasfered from Novi Sad to Vojvodina.

== FK Vojvodina ==
The club was by then bringing many good players into the team in what would be known as the "Millioners team". Since then, Vojvodina begin having serious pretensions to win the Yugoslav First League. That goal was in the view of the club direction unreachable without Velker, so an enormous effort was made to bring him into the club, and after long and difficult negotiations, to enormous disappointment of NAK, Velker finally signed. From 1937, all the way until 1951, he would become a crucial player of the club. This is how a newspaper "Sportska revija" from 15 May 1940 described him:

"Velker, the attacking player of Vojvodina, is always one of the best players. All other players, even the best ones, can disappoint, even be unnoticed, but that rarely happens to him. He is the engine of the team. Technician "per excellence". In the matches of Vojvodina he stands out by his devoted, skillful and fair style of play. That is Velker. He represents what a footballer should be, the way a true footballer is, a real sportsman. He doesn´t protest referees' decisions, he doesn´t reply opponents hard play and he doesn´t quarrel with other players. During the match, you won´t even hear him, but you will see him a lot. Despite his skills allowing him to play in any club in the league, he stays unpretentious. And that is what you rarely find in a star. Velker is the best, more disciplined and more humble player in Novi Sad. And he has definitely deserved to play for long time now in the national team squad."

The national team was a wound for the players of Vojvodina because there was no place for them in it. All places were reserved for players from Belgrade, Zagreb and Sarajevo so all nationalities in the Kingdom of Yugoslavia would be satisfied. Velker had offers from clubs from Zagreb and Belgrade that would eventually open a way for him into the national team, but he stayed loyal to Novi Sad and FK Vojvodina.

The "Millioners team" failed to immediately make an impact, but in the season 1940/41 was fighting for the top. The final stage of the championship was interrupted by the beginning of the Second World War, and the Axis bombing, mobilization and country's capitulation made the competition to continue to be impossible. During German occupation, the new authorities closed the club and confiscated its property. Velker returned to Ravno Selo. German Wehrmacht begin recruiting Germans from Vojvodina into the SS units, and Velker was recruited into Vrbas. He soon escaped and was for some time on the run. Because of that, his family's house was vandalised by local German youth. But the information about his desertion also came to Novi Sad, to his former club NAK, and the club president; simultaneously the local police chief, agreed to give him an amnesty in exchange of him becoming a NAK player. In order to avoid going into concentration camps, other former Vojvodina players such as Marjanović, Plac, Avramović, Jovanović, Medarić and Živković also joined the club. He played with NAK, now known as Ujvideki AC, in the Hungarian Championship four seasons, scoring 38 goals in the 76 appearances he made in those seasons between 1941 and 1944.

After liberation by Allies began, in Autumn 1944, the renewal of FK Vojvodina began. In 1945 the Championship was not played by clubs but by country's regions, and Velker played in the team of Vojvodina, made of players of FK Vojvodina and FK Spartak Subotica, finishing fourth. The club for a short period was named Sloga and initially played in the Second Yugoslav League. Many critics in Novi Sad believe that the club was dropped out from the top league because of the national representation and some animosity that the new communist authorities had towards the former burgeoise club. Velker was known in this period for his heroic performances even in a fixed-match games. The club suffered some difficulties in this period, and it is known that Velker financially supported, on several occasions, the travels that the club needed to make to play against opponents. However Vojvodina soon recovered, and in 1948 it returned to the First League.

== International career ==
Between 1938 and 1940, Velker made three appearances for the Yugoslavia national team, scoring two goals.

== Retirement ==
Velker played his last season in 1951, having played 30 league matches and scoring 15 goals. His fairway match was a friendly match against FK Sarajevo.

After retiring, he moved to Cleveland, Ohio, US, where his wife's family lived. It was there that he died on 29 November 1995. He was sometimes known as Josip Velker, and his surname was also spelled occasionally as Welker.
