= Milan Babić (footballer) =

Serbian footballer

Personal information
- Date of birth: 5 August 1955 (age 71)
- Place of birth: Nakovo, SFR Yugoslavia
- Height: 1.82 m (6 ft 0 in)
- Position: Defender

Senior career*
Years	Team	Apps	(Gls)
1975–1977	Red Star Belgrade	24	(0)
1978	Radnik Bijeljina	15	(1)
1978–1980	Napredak Kruševac	59	(6)
1980	Partizan	13	(0)
1981–1983	Napredak Kruševac	56	(1)
1984–1985	Vojvodina	18	(1)
1985–1986	Béziers	34	(0)
1986–1990	Montceau Bourgogne	90	(2)
- * Club domestic league appearances and goals

Milan Babić (Serbian Cyrillic: Милан Бабић; born 5 August 1955) is a Serbian former professional footballer who played for the three major Serbian clubs; Red Star, Partizan and Vojvodina.

== Career ==
Born in Nakovo, in municipality of Kikinda, in SR Serbia, back at that time still within Yugoslavia, Babić started playing as defender with powerhouse Red Star Belgrade. He made his debut in the 1975–76 Yugoslav First League and left Red Star at winter-break of 1977–78 season to play the second half of season with FK Radnik Bijeljina in the 1977–78 Yugoslav Second League.

In summer 1978 he joined FK Napredak Kruševac at time playing in the Yugoslav First League. Babić will marked an entire period of Napredak as he will play in the club since the late 1970s till the mid 1980s. His performances with Napredak at top level were so solid that he was brought by the other Yugoslav powerhouse, FK Partizan, to play in the first half of the 1980–81 Yugoslav First League. At winter-break he returned to Napredak to help them avoid relegation, however the club failed. Despite that, Babić stay at Napredak three more years playing in the Yugoslav Second League, all the way till the winter-break of 1983–84 season, when he was signed by FK Vojvodina, thus making his return to the First League.

After a season and a half at Vojvodina, Babić accepted a move abroad, signing in summer 1985 with French Ligue 2 side AS Béziers Hérault. After a season with Béziers, his spell in France was followed by four more seasons at French second level, by playing with FC Montceau Bourgogne.
