= NAK Novi Sad =

Hungarian football club

Novosadski atletski klub (NAK) (Serbian Cyrillic: Новосадски атлетски клуб, НАК; Hungarian: Újvidéki Athlétikai Club, UAC) was a football club from Novi Sad that existed from 1910 until 1945.

== History ==
Formed in 1910 while Novi Sad was still part of Austria-Hungary, the club mostly gathered players of Hungarian ethnicity. The town also had other football clubs that were similarly ethnically based, namely FK Vojvodina, which was mostly Serb, and Juda Makabi, representing the local Jewish community. NAK competed in the Hungarian Second League between 1911 and 1914.

After the First World War the region became part of the Kingdom of Serbs, Croats and Slovenes, renamed Yugoslavia in 1929, and the club begin competing in the League of the Subassociation of Novi Sad, a second level which gave access to the Yugoslav First League. In 1922 NAK played in the qualifiers for the first edition of the First League however it was eliminated by its city rivals FK Vojvodina.

NAK mostly played in the Novi Sad Football Subassociation until they finally managed to qualify for the top league in 1935. The 1935–36 Yugoslav Football Championship was played in a cup format and NAK managed to post a series of good results. They eliminated ŽAK Velika Kikinda in the round of sixteen by 4–0 at home and a 3–3 away draw, thus qualifying to the quarter-finals where they beat Slavija Osijek with a double victory of 4–0 and 2–0. They were eventually stopped in the semi-finals where after achieving a draw in Sarajevo against FK Slavija unexpectedly lost at home by 1–3. In the period between the two world wars, Novi Sad saw a fierce rivalry develop between NAK and FK Vojvodina.

However, that was the only participation of NAK in the Yugoslav top league until 1941, when the club, after the invasion of Yugoslavia begin competing in the Hungarian league system. Because of this, after the liberation, the club was disbanded by the new Yugoslav authorities in 1945.

During the period of Second World War, as Újvidéki AC, it played 3 seasons in the Hungarian Championship, between 1941 and 1944. In the first two seasons they made mid-table results, by finishing 12th in 1941–42, and 11th in 1942–43, however in 1943–44 they impressed by finishing in 6th place. The 1944–45 season was abandoned after only four match days, with UAC having played only 2 games. Between 1941 and 1944 they were coached by István Mészarós, a former Hungary national team player and former US Pistoiese, Újpest FC and BSK Belgrade coach on those occasions, the 1941–42 and 1943–44 seasons, while other coaches were Milorad Ognjanov (the first 6 rounds of the 1941–44 season), Edo Plac (first half of 1942–43, first 6 rounds of 1943–44 and 1944 seasons) and Pál Horváth (second half of the 1942–43 season). The ethnic structure of the team was mixed. UAC blue and white shirt was worn at this period by Hungarians Palfi, Csillag, Takács and Hargitai, Serbs Avramović, Marjanović, Živković and Jovanović, Croat Medarić, and ethnic Germans Platz and Welker. However Serbs suffered forced Magyarization which included a mandatory name change, thus Serbian players played under Hungarian names: Avar, Máriás, Zsoldos, Mézes or Jánosi.

== Honours ==
- Novi Sad Football Subassociation
  - Champions (2): 1933, 1936

== Notable players ==
Among the notable players of NAK Novi Sad it is worth mentioning that Bela Šefer and Jožef Velker became Yugoslavia national team players, and that Hungarian goalkeeper Lajos Schönfeld Tusko, who will later move to BSK Belgrade, became considered one of the best goalkeepers in the country by the press. Also among the notable players is worth mention goalkeeper Károly Nemes who played with MTK Budapest and SK Rapid Wien before coming to Novi Sad after World War I. He later played with SK Jugoslavija and won two Yugoslav titles in 1924 and 1925. During the 1930s he coached FK Vojvodina, NAK's main city rivals. A group of Vojvodina players forcefully joined NAK during the period of Hungarian occupation in order to avoid problems or even being sent to labour (concentration) camps, among them there was goalkeeper Edvard Plac (Ede Platz), Ivan Medarić (Iván Mézes), Jovan Marjanović (János Máriás), Veljko Avramović (Velykó Avar), Jovica Jovanović (György Jánosi) and Lazar Živković (Lázár Zsoldos).

During World War II, Hungarian international József Turay played in the club.

For a list of former players with Wikipedia article, please see: Category:NAK Novi Sad players.
