= Novi Sad Football Subassociation =

The Novi Sad Football Subassociation (Serbo-Croato-Slovenian: Novosadski loptački podsavez / Новосадски лоптачки подсавез) was one of the regional football governing bodies under the tutorial of the Football Association of Yugoslavia. It was formed on 13 April 1930 having been part of the Belgrade Football Subassociation until then.

It included the clubs from the territory of the province (župa) of Novi Sad – the municipalities of Novi Sad, Sremska Mitrovica, Ruma and Šabac. It developed considerably, and by 1936 it became the third largest Subassociation with 49 clubs, which become 53 in 1939.

The presidents of the Novi Sad Football Subassociation were Kosta Hadži (1930–1939) and Stojan Branković (1939–1944).

== Seasons and champions ==
- 1931: The season was not finished as the entire league system modified.
- 1932: FK Vojvodina (2nd placed FK Mačva Šabac also played in the Yugoslav Championship qualifiers)
- 1933: NAK Novi Sad. (Note: Vojvodina did not participated as it played in the 1932–33 Yugoslav Football Championship and the two leagues were played simultaneously)
- 1934: FK Vojvodina
- 1935: FK Vojvodina
- 1936: NAK Novi Sad
- 1937: FK Vojvodina
- 1938: FK Vojvodina
- 1939: FK Vojvodina
- 1940: FK Vojvodina
- 1941: Železničar Inđija
