= 1974–75 NK Hajduk Split season =

Hajduk Split
1974–75 season
- Chairman: Tito Kirigin
- Manager: Tomislav Ivić
- First League: 1st
- Yugoslav Cup: Winners
- European Cup: Second round
- Top goalscorer: League: Slaviša Žungul (15); All: Slaviša Žungul (24)
- Highest home attendance: 30,000 (Two matches)
- Lowest home attendance: 12,000 v Proleter Zrenjanin, 20 October 1974

The 1974–75 season was the 64th season in Hajduk Split's history and their 29th season in the Yugoslav First League. Their 1st-place finish in the 1973–74 season meant it was their 29th successive season playing in the Yugoslav First League.

== Competitions ==
=== Overall ===
Competition	Started round	Final result	First match	Last Match
1974–75 Yugoslav First League	–	1st	17 August	29 June
1974 Yugoslav Cup	First round	Winners	14 August	29 November
1974–75 European Cup	First round	Second round	19 September	6 November

=== Yugoslav First League ===
==== Classification ====
Pos	Team	Pld	W	D	L	GF	GA	GD	Pts	Qualification or relegation
1	Hajduk Split (C)	34	20	8	6	56	29	+27	48	Qualification for European Cup first round
2	Vojvodina	34	16	13	5	53	32	+21	45	Qualification for UEFA Cup first round
3	Red Star Belgrade	34	16	8	10	61	44	+17	40	Qualification for UEFA Cup first round
4	Velež	34	15	9	10	62	35	+27	39	
5	Dinamo Zagreb	34	11	16	7	38	31	+7	38	

Source: rsssf.org
Rules for classification: 1) points; 2) goal difference; 3) number of goals scored.
(C) Champions

==== Results summary ====
Overall								Home						Away					
Pld	W	D	L	GF	GA	GD	Pts	W	D	L	GF	GA	GD	W	D	L	GF	GA	GD
34	20	8	6	56	29	+27	68	12	4	1	36	10	+26	8	4	5	20	19	+1

==== Results by round ====
Round	1	2	3	4	5	6	7	8	9	10	11	12	13	14	15	16	17	18	19	20	21	22	23	24	25	26	27	28	29	30	31	32	33	34
Ground	A	H	A	H	A	H	A	H	A	A	H	A	H	A	H	A	H	H	A	H	A	H	A	H	A	H	H	A	H	A	H	A	H	A
Result	L	W	W	W	L	W	W	W	W	D	D	W	W	D	W	L	W	L	D	D	L	W	W	D	W	W	W	L	D	D	W	W	W	W
Position	15	8	4	3	6	4	2	2	2	2	2	2	1	1	1	1	1	1	1	1	1	1	1	1	1	1	1	1	1	1	1	1	1	1

Source: Competitive matches
A = Away; H = Home; W = Win; D = Draw; L = Loss

== Matches ==
=== First League ===
Round	Date	Venue	Opponent	Score	Attendance	Hajduk Scorers
1	17 Aug	A	Vojvodina	0–2	8,000	
2	25 Aug	H	Radnički Kragujevac	4–0	20,000	Jerković (2), Buljan, Oblak
3	28 Aug	A	Dinamo Zagreb	2–1	50,000	Oblak (2)
4	31 Aug	H	Željezničar	3–0	20,000	Jerković, Luketin, Šalov
5	8 Sep	A	Velež	0–5	20,000	
6	15 Sep	H	Radnički Niš	6–1	16,000	Jerković (2), Žungul, Šurjak, Džoni, Oblak
7	22 Sep	A	Partizan	3–2	40,000	Jovanić, Jerković, Žungul
8	6 Oct	H	OFK Beograd	2–0	24,000	Šurjak, Žungul
9	9 Oct	A	Čelik	1–0	22,000	Žungul
10	13 Oct	A	Bor	0–0	7,000	
11	20 Oct	H	Proleter Zrenjanin	1–1	12,000	Boljat
12	26 Oct	A	Sloboda	2–0	8,000	Boljat, Mijač
13	3 Nov	H	Sarajevo	2–0	18,000	Mijač, Žungul
14	10 Nov	A	Vardar	1–1	15,000	Žungul
15	17 Nov	H	Red Star	2–0	30,000	Šurjak, Jerković
16	24 Nov	A	Olimpija	1–2	18,000	Duplančić
17	8 Dec	H	Rijeka	1–0	18,000	Mijač
18	2 Mar	H	Vojvodina	1–4	25,000	Novoselac (o.g.)
19	9 Mar	A	Radnički Kragujevac	0–0	25,000	
20	16 Mar	H	Dinamo Zagreb	0–0	15,000	
21	22 Mar	A	Željezničar	0–1	3,000	
22	30 Mar	H	Velež	1–0	30,000	Jerković
23	6 Apr	A	Radnički Niš	1–0	20,000	Matković
24	20 Apr	H	Partizan	2–2	20,000	Žungul (2)
25	27 Apr	A	OFK Beograd	2–0	15,000	Šurjak, Žungul
26	30 Apr	H	Čelik	2–0	20,000	Mijač, Šurjak
27	4 May	H	Bor	2–0	17,000	Jerković, Žungul
28	11 May	A	Proleter Zrenjanin	0–2	20,000	
29	18 May	H	Sloboda	1–1	15,000	Mijač
30	21 May	A	Sarajevo	1–1	30,000	Džoni
31	25 May	H	Vardar	1–0	15,000	Peruzović
32	15 Jun	A	Red Star	2–1	50,000	Jovanić (2)
33	22 Jun	H	Olimpija	5–1	25,000	Dautbegović (o.g.), Žungul (2), Šurjak (2)
34	29 Jun	A	Rijeka	4–1	23,000	Žungul (3), Mijač

Source: hajduk.hr

=== Yugoslav Cup ===
Round	Date	Venue	Opponent	Score	Attendance	Hajduk Scorers
R1	14 Aug	H	Proleter Zrenjanin	3–0		Oblak, Šurjak, Žungul
R2	11 Sep	A	Bačka	2–0	10,000	Mijač, Oblak
QF	16 Oct	H	OFK Beograd	3–0	14,000	Žungul (3)
SF	13 Nov	H	Vardar	5–0	15,000	Smolčić, Jerković (2), Šurjak
Final	29 Nov	N	Borac Banja Luka	1–0	20,000	Boljat

Sources: hajduk.hr

=== European Cup ===
Round	Date	Venue	Opponent	Score	Attendance	Hajduk Scorers
R1	19 Sep	H	Keflavík (Iceland)	7–1	13,005	Žungul (4), Šurjak (2), Oblak
R1	24 Sep	AR	Keflavík (Iceland)	2–0	7,875	Džoni, Mijač
R2	23 Oct	H	Saint-Étienne (France)	4–1	15,527	Jerković (2), Žungul, Mijač
R2	6 Nov	A (France)	Saint-Étienne (France)	1–5	26,418	Jovanić

Source: hajduk.hr

== Player seasonal records ==
=== Top scorers ===
Rank	Name	League	Europe	Cup	Total
1	(Socialist Federal Republic of Yugoslavia) Slaviša Žungul	15	5	4	24
2	(Socialist Federal Republic of Yugoslavia) Jurica Jerković	9	2	2	13
3	(Socialist Federal Republic of Yugoslavia) Ivica Šurjak	7	2	2	11
4	(Socialist Federal Republic of Yugoslavia) Željko Mijač	6	2	1	8
5	(Socialist Federal Republic of Yugoslavia) Branko Oblak	4	1	2	7
6	(Socialist Federal Republic of Yugoslavia) Mario Boljat	2	2	1	5
7	(Socialist Federal Republic of Yugoslavia) Mićun Jovanić	3	1	–	4
8	(Socialist Federal Republic of Yugoslavia) Vilson Džoni	2	1	–	3
9	(Socialist Federal Republic of Yugoslavia) Vladimir Smolčić	–	–	2	2
10	(Socialist Federal Republic of Yugoslavia) Ivan Buljan	1	–	–	1
10	(Socialist Federal Republic of Yugoslavia) Joško Duplančić	–	1	–	1
10	(Socialist Federal Republic of Yugoslavia) Šime Luketin	1	–	–	1
10	(Socialist Federal Republic of Yugoslavia) Ivica Matković	1	–	–	1
10	(Socialist Federal Republic of Yugoslavia) Luka Peruzović	1	–	–	1
10	(Socialist Federal Republic of Yugoslavia) Nenad Šalov	1	–	–	1
	Own goals	2	–	–	2
	TOTALS	56	14	14	84

Source: Competitive matches

== See also ==
- 1974–75 Yugoslav First League
- 1974 Yugoslav Cup

== External sources ==
- 1974–75 Yugoslav First League at rsssf.com
- 1974 Yugoslav Cup at rsssf.com
- 1974–75 European Cup at rsssf.com
- 1974–75 Yugoslav First League at historical-lineups.com
