= Rizah Mešković =

Bosnian footballer (born 1947)

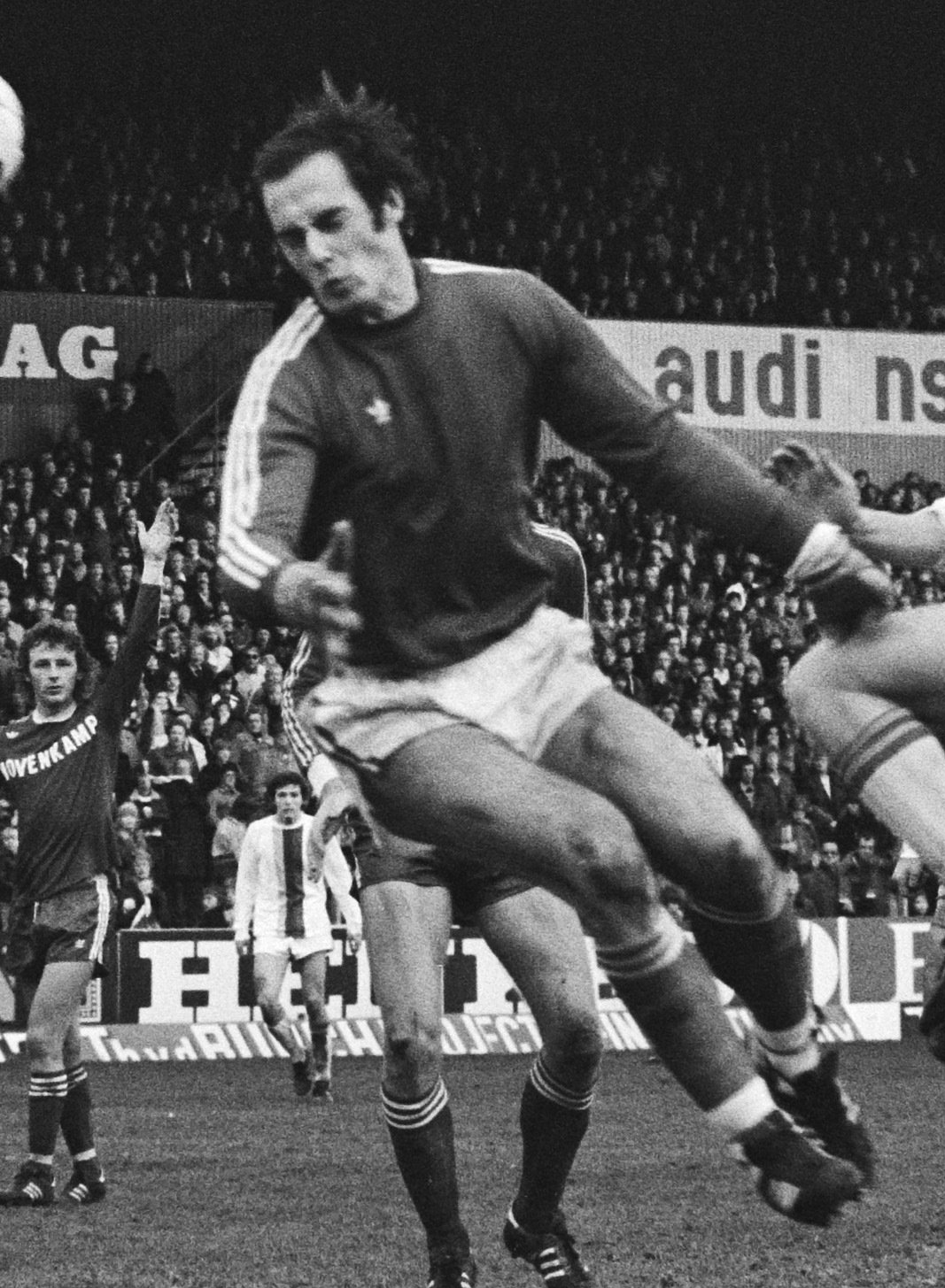
- Mešković playing for AZ '67 in 1976

Personal information
- Date of birth: 10 August 1947 (age 79)
- Place of birth: Tuzla, FPR Yugoslavia
- Position: Goalkeeper

Youth career
- Sloboda Tuzla

Senior career*
| Years | Team | Apps | (Gls) |
| 1964–1973 | Sloboda Tuzla | 220 | (0) |
| 1973–1976 | Hajduk Split | 53 | (0) |
| 1976–1979 | AZ '67 | 68 | (0) |
| 1979–1983 | Sloboda Tuzla | 21 | (0) |
| 1983–1984 | Budućnost Banovići | | |
| 1984–1985 | Radnik Bijeljina | 23 | (0) |
| 1985–1987 | Bratstvo Gračanica | | |
| 1987–1988 | Orebić | | |

International career
| 1971–1974 | Yugoslavia | 1 | (0) |

Managerial career
- 1988–1989: Yugoslavia B
- 1990: Sloboda Tuzla
- 1990–1991: Yugoslavia (assistant)
- 1991–1992: Al Wahda
- 1992–1993: Al Shabab
- 1993–1994: Al Nassr
- 1994–1996: Sharjah
- 1996–1997: Al Hilal
- 1997–1998: Al Wasl
- 1998–1999: Al Nasr Dubai
- 1999–2001: Al Shabab
- 2001–2003: Al Ahli
- 2003–2005: Al Sadd (assistant)
- 2005–2007: Al Shabab
- * Club domestic league appearances and goals

Rizah Mešković (born 10 August 1947) is a Bosnian former professional football player and manager who played as a goalkeeper. At international level, he played for the Yugoslavia national team once, in 1972, and was part of the squad at the 1974 FIFA World Cup in West Germany.

Throughout his football career, both as a player and coach, Mešković had many success and received a number of awards from UEFA, FIFA and the Football Association of Yugoslavia (FJS).

== Club career ==
=== Sloboda Tuzla ===
According to Mešković, he started his professional football career at boyhood age, and the first club that he ever played in was FK Sloboda Tuzla from 1964, where he remained until 1973, that is, until his departure to HNK Hajduk Split. According to Gojko Škrbić, Sloboda sold him to Hajduk for two years with the compensation of the then 14 million old dinar.

In the 1968–69 Yugoslav Second League season, Sloboda won 36 points and scored 50 goals, while Mešković capitulated only nine times, the least of all other Second league and First league goalkeepers.

=== Hajduk Split ===
For the "Bili (The Whites)", Mešković played 107 games, 53 games in the championship, 9 games in the cup, 6 in European competitions, and 39 games in friendly matches. He stood on the goal for the first time in a farewell game of the legendary Radomir Vukčević (Vučka), Ivica Hlevnjak and Pero Nadoveza. The first official appearance for Hajduk, was in the Yugoslav Cup on 12 August 1973, in the starting lineup against FK Vardar, which Hajduk won with 5:1.

While at Hajduk, the fans nicknamed him "Mate" and sang the song "From Marjan's blowing the breeze Mešković keeps the door guarding us." He won two Yugoslavian Championships in 1974 (with 33 appearances) and 1975 (with 16 appearances). He also won 3 cups in a row in 1973, 1974 and in 1976.

==== 789 minutes without a goal ====
Rizah holds in the territory of the former Yugoslavia a record of 789 minutes of not conceding a goal. That series of not conceding a goal was broken by Vladimir Petković. The last goal he received was in a match against FK Željezničar Sarajevo in Split on 25 November 1973 (1: 1). From that game, goals weren't conceded in matches played against: FK Borac Banja Luka in Banja Luka (0: 0), then OFK Beograd in Split (2: 0), FK Vojvodina in Split (3: 0), NK Dinamo Zagreb in Zagreb (0: 1), OFK Bor in Split (3: 0), FK Radnički Niš in Niš (0: 1) and NK Čelik Zenica in Split (1: 0). Only in the 22nd round Hajduk lost from FK Sarajevo 1: 0.However, in that game, Brane Oblak, Ivan Buljan, Slaviša Žungul and Mićun Jovanić did not play. The players that did play were: Mešković, Vilson Džoni, Vedran Rožić, Luka Peruzović, Dragan Holcer, Mario Boljat, Željko Mijač, Dražen Mužinić, Joško Gluić, Jurica and Ivica Šurjak.

=== From AZ '67 to Orebić ===
With 107 games to his name, he left Hajduk in 1976 and joined Dutch club AZ '67 where he stayed until 1979 and had to fight for his place between the posts with Gerrit Vooys. After Alkmaar, he returned to Tuzla and once again joined Sloboda in 1979 where he stayed until 1983, after which he went to several domestic clubs. They were: FK Budućnost Banovići, where he stayed from 1983 to 1984, then FK Radnik Bijeljina from 1984 to 1985, NK Bratstvo Gračanica, from 1985 to 1987. He ended his career in NK Orebić where he played from 1987 to 1988.

== International career ==
For the national team of Yugoslavia, he played one game, on 29 June 1972, against Scotland, a game that was played in the Brazil Independence Cup in Belo Horizonte which ended with a score of 2: 2. He was also a part of the squad that played at the 1974 FIFA World Cup in West Germany. However, Mešković didn't play a single game at the Cup.

== Coaching career ==
He started his coaching career with the completion of the coaching school in Sarajevo, and already in 1988 he trained the Yugoslav B team and FK Sloboda Tuzla in late 1990. In the same year, he assisted Ivica Osim with the Yugoslavia national football team at the 1990 FIFA World Cup.

In 1991 as a member of the Yugoslavia staff, he went to the United Arab Emirates where he coached several clubs and A and B national teams. He also spent some time in Saudi Arabia as a coach (Al Ahli SC in Jeddah, 2001–2002). After Saudi Arabia he also coached in Qatar (Al Sadd in Doha, 2002–2005 as an assistant). However, he spent most of his time in the Emirates where he trained clubs Al Wahda FC (1991–1992) in Abu Dhabi, Al Shabab (1992–1993, 1999–2001 and 2005–2007), Al Wasl F.C. (1997–1998) from Dubai and Al Nasr SC (1998–1999) also in Dubai. He ended his professional coaching career in 2007.

== Honours ==
=== Player ===
Hajduk Split

- Yugoslav First League: 1974, 1975
- Yugoslav Cup: 1973, 1974, 1975–76

AZ '67

- KNVB Cup: 1977–78

=== Manager ===
Al Ahli

- Crown Prince Cup: 2001–02
- Saudi Federation Cup: 2001–02
- GCC Champions League: 2002
