= Sportske novosti Yellow Shirt award =

Croatian football award

The Sportske novosti Yellow Shirt award or SN Yellow Shirt for short (Croatian: Žuta majica Sportskih novosti) is an annual football award given by the Croatian sports daily Sportske novosti. It is awarded to the best football player playing in the Croatian First League at the end of every season, based on post-match ratings awarded by sports journalists over the course of a season.

Established in 1953, the award was originally sponsored by the defunct Zagreb-based sports newspaper Narodni sport and its sports weekly Sportska panorama, and was awarded to the Player of the Season in the Yugoslav First League. In February 1962, Narodni sport was acquired by the Vjesnik publishing company and renamed Sportske novosti (SN). Since 1991 and the breakup of Yugoslavia, the paper gives the award to the best players in the Prva HNL, Croatia's top flight.

As of 2024 only eight players have won the award on more than occasion, with each of them winning two awards:

- Vladica Kovačević (1963, 1965)
- Rudolf Belin (1964, 1969)
- Jurica Jerković (1971, 1976)
- Igor Cvitanović (1996, 1997)
- Ivica Olić (2002, 2003)
- Eduardo (2006, 2007)
- Marko Livaja (2022, 2023)
- Ramón Miérez (2021, 2024)

== Winners ==
=== Yugoslav league ===
Season	Player (Wins)	Club
1952–53	(Socialist Federal Republic of Yugoslavia) Bernard Vukas (1)	Hajduk Split
1953–54	(Socialist Federal Republic of Yugoslavia) Stjepan Bobek (1)	Partizan
1954–55	(Socialist Federal Republic of Yugoslavia) Joško Vidošević (1)	Hajduk Split
1955–56	(Socialist Federal Republic of Yugoslavia) Ivica Horvat (1)	Dinamo Zagreb
1956–57	(Socialist Federal Republic of Yugoslavia) Todor Veselinović (1)	Vojvodina
1957–58	(Socialist Federal Republic of Yugoslavia) Tomislav Crnković (1)	Dinamo Zagreb
1958–59	(Socialist Federal Republic of Yugoslavia) Bora Kostić (1)	Red Star
1959–60	(Socialist Federal Republic of Yugoslavia) Vladimir Beara (1)	Red Star
1960–61	(Socialist Federal Republic of Yugoslavia) Milutin Šoškić (1)	Partizan
1961–62	(Socialist Federal Republic of Yugoslavia) Dražan Jerković (1)	Dinamo Zagreb
1962–63	(Socialist Federal Republic of Yugoslavia) Vladica Kovačević (1)	Partizan
1963–64	(Socialist Federal Republic of Yugoslavia) Rudolf Belin (1)	Dinamo Zagreb
1964–65	(Socialist Federal Republic of Yugoslavia) Vladica Kovačević (2)	Partizan
1965–66	(Socialist Federal Republic of Yugoslavia) Silvester Takač (1)	Vojvodina
1966–67	(Socialist Federal Republic of Yugoslavia) Ivica Osim (1)	Željezničar
1967–68	(Socialist Federal Republic of Yugoslavia) Dragan Holcer (1)	Hajduk Split
1968–69	(Socialist Federal Republic of Yugoslavia) Rudolf Belin (2)	Dinamo Zagreb
1969–70	(Socialist Federal Republic of Yugoslavia) Filip Blašković (1)	Dinamo Zagreb
1970–71	(Socialist Federal Republic of Yugoslavia) Jurica Jerković (1)	Hajduk Split
1971–72	(Socialist Federal Republic of Yugoslavia) Slobodan Santrač (1)	OFK Belgrade
1972–73	(Socialist Federal Republic of Yugoslavia) Dušan Bajević (1)	Velež
1973–74	(Socialist Federal Republic of Yugoslavia) Branko Oblak (1)	Hajduk Split
1974–75	(Socialist Federal Republic of Yugoslavia) Franjo Vladić (1)	Velež
1975–76	(Socialist Federal Republic of Yugoslavia) Jurica Jerković (2)	Hajduk Split
1976–77	(Socialist Federal Republic of Yugoslavia) Abid Kovačević (1)	Borac Banja Luka
1977–78	(Socialist Federal Republic of Yugoslavia) Nenad Stojković (1)	Partizan
1978–79	(Socialist Federal Republic of Yugoslavia) Safet Sušić (1)	Sarajevo
1979–80	(Socialist Federal Republic of Yugoslavia) Vladimir Petrović (1)	Red Star
1980–81	(Socialist Federal Republic of Yugoslavia) Zlatko Vujović (1)	Hajduk Split
1981–82	(Socialist Federal Republic of Yugoslavia) Velimir Zajec (1)	Dinamo Zagreb
1983–83	(Socialist Federal Republic of Yugoslavia) Dragan Mance (1)	Partizan
1983–84	(Socialist Federal Republic of Yugoslavia) Zoran Simović (1)	Hajduk Split
1984–85	(Socialist Federal Republic of Yugoslavia) Predrag Pašić (1)	Sarajevo
1985–86	(Socialist Federal Republic of Yugoslavia) Nenad Gračan (1)	Rijeka
1986–87	(Socialist Federal Republic of Yugoslavia) Semir Tuce (1)	Velež
1987–88	(Socialist Federal Republic of Yugoslavia) Dragan Stojković (1)	Red Star
1988–89	(Socialist Federal Republic of Yugoslavia) Miloš Šestić (1)	Vojvodina
1989–90	(Socialist Federal Republic of Yugoslavia) Aljoša Asanović (1)	Hajduk Split
1990–91	(Socialist Federal Republic of Yugoslavia) Zvonimir Boban (1)	Dinamo Zagreb

=== Croatian league ===
Season	Player (Wins)	Club
1992	(Croatia) Goran Vučević (1)	Hajduk Split
1992–93	(Croatia) Goran Vlaović (1)	Croatia Zagreb
1993–94	(Croatia) Mladen Mladenović (1)	Rijeka
1994–95	(Croatia) Robert Špehar (1)	Osijek
1995–96	(Croatia) Igor Cvitanović (1)	Croatia Zagreb
1996–97	(Croatia) Igor Cvitanović (2)	Croatia Zagreb
1997–98	(Croatia) Mario Bazina (1)	Hrvatski Dragovoljac
1998–99	(Croatia) Miljenko Mumlek (1)	Varteks
1999–2000	(Croatia) Ivan Bošnjak (1)	Cibalia
2000–01	(Croatia) Boško Balaban (1)	Dinamo Zagreb
2001–02	(Croatia) Ivica Olić (1)	NK Zagreb
2002–03	(Croatia) Ivica Olić (2)	Dinamo Zagreb
2003–04	(Croatia) Niko Kranjčar (1)	Dinamo Zagreb
2004–05	(Bosnia and Herzegovina) Mladen Bartolović (1)	NK Zagreb
2005–06	(Croatia) Eduardo (1)	Dinamo Zagreb
2006–07	(Croatia) Eduardo (2)	Dinamo Zagreb
2007–08	(Croatia) Luka Modrić (1)	Dinamo Zagreb
2008–09	(Croatia) Mario Mandžukić (1)	Dinamo Zagreb
2009–10	(Bosnia and Herzegovina) Senijad Ibričić (1)	Hajduk Split
2010–11	(Bosnia and Herzegovina) Ivan Krstanović (1)	NK Zagreb
2011–12	(Croatia) Anas Sharbini (1)	Hajduk Split
2012–13	(Croatia) Leon Benko (1)	Rijeka
2013–14	(Croatia) Duje Čop (1)	Dinamo Zagreb
2014–15	(Croatia) Gabrijel Boban (1)	NK Zagreb
2015–16	(Bosnia and Herzegovina) Tino-Sven Sušić (1)	Hajduk Split
2016–17	(Croatia) Franko Andrijašević (1)	Rijeka
2017–18	(Brazil) Héber Araujo dos Santos (1)	Rijeka
2018–19	(Croatia) Mijo Caktaš (1)	Hajduk Split
2019–20	(Croatia) Antonio Čolak (1)	Rijeka
2020–21	(Argentina) Ramón Miérez (1)	Osijek
2021–22	(Croatia) Marko Livaja (1)	Hajduk Split
2022–23	(Croatia) Marko Livaja (2)	Hajduk Split
2023–24	(Argentina) Ramón Miérez (2)	Osijek

Source: Nogometni-magazin.com

Notes on club name changes:

- Dinamo Zagreb changed their name to "HAŠK Građanski" in June 1991 and then again in February 1993 to "Croatia Zagreb". They reverted to "Dinamo Zagreb" in February 2000.
- While the original NK Varaždin (1931–2015), known as NK Varteks from 1958 until June 2010, no longer exists, two new teams, both unassociated with the earlier club, have been founded in the city of Varaždin: NK Varteks, founded 2011; and NK Varaždin, called Varaždin ŠN when founded in 2012, when it overlapped with the original club.

== Other awards ==
- Football Oscar, given by the Croatian union Football syndicate, chosen by players and managers of league clubs.
- Prva HNL Player of the Year (Tportal), given by the Croatian website Tportal, chosen by captains of league clubs.
- Croatian Footballer of the Year, given by the Croatian newspaper Večernji list, chosen by sport journalists.
