= 1974–75 Yugoslav First League =

Prva savezna liga
- Season: 1974–75
- Dates: 18 August 1974 – 29 June 1975
- Champions: Hajduk Split; 6th Federal League title 8th Yugoslav title overall
- Relegated: FK Bor; Proleter Zrenjanin
- European Cup: Hajduk Split
- Cup Winners' Cup: Borac Banja Luka
- UEFA Cup: Vojvodina; Red Star
- Matches played: 272
- Goals scored: 746 (2.74 per match)
- Top goalscorer: Boško Đorđević; Dušan Savić (20 goals each)
- Average attendance: 10,859

The 1974–75 Yugoslav First League season was the 29th season of the First Federal League of Yugoslavia (Croatian: Prva savezna liga, Serbian: Прва савезна лига, Slovenian: Prva zvezna liga), the top level association football competition of SFR Yugoslavia, since its establishment in 1946. A total of 18 teams competed in the league, with the previous season's champions Hajduk Split successfully defending their title, finishing the season three points clear of runners-up Vojvodina.

The season began on 17 August 1974 and concluded on 29 June 1975. This was the second national title win for Hajduk under the guidance of manager Tomislav Ivić, who had previously led the club to three consecutive Yugoslav Cup wins in 1972, 1973 and 1974. Over the subsequent seasons, Ivić would go on to win the 1976 cup and 1978–79 championship with Hajduk, becoming the most successful manager in club's history.

Strikers Boško Đorđević of Partizan and Dušan Savić of Red Star shared the title of top goalscorer with 20 goals each. Both players topped the scoring table for the first time in their careers, with Savić repeating the achievement in the 1978–79 season.

== Teams ==
A total of eighteen teams contested the league, including sixteen sides from the 1973–74 season and two sides promoted from the 1973–74 Yugoslav Second League (YSL) as winners of the two second level divisions East and West. The league was contested in a double round robin format, with each club playing every other club twice, for a total of 34 rounds. Two points were awarded for wins and one point for draws.

FK Borac Banja Luka and NK Zagreb were relegated from the 1973–74 Yugoslav First League after finishing the season in bottom two places of the league table. Borac had completed a four-year stay at the highest level of Yugoslav football, while NK Zagreb had to return to second level after only one year in top flight.

The two clubs promoted to top level were FK Radnički Kragujevac and NK Rijeka. Radnički Kragujevac returned to the highest division as winners of YSL Division East after spending two years in second level, which had ended their previous 1969–1972 three-season spell. In comparison, Croatian side NK Rijeka returned as winners of YSL Division West after four years in second level, which had interrupted their earlier 1958–1969 eleven-year top level tenure. NK Rijeka would go on to remain in top flight until the 1990–91 season, when Croatian and Slovenian clubs abandoned the Yugoslav league amid the breakup of Yugoslavia.

Team	Location	Federal Republic	Position in 1973–74
Bor	Bor	SR Serbia	16th
Čelik	Zenica	SR Bosnia and Herzegovina	6th
Dinamo Zagreb	Zagreb	SR Croatia	7th
Hajduk Split	Split	SR Croatia	1st
OFK Belgrade	Belgrade	SR Serbia	5th
Olimpija Ljubljana	Ljubljana	SR Slovenia	10th
Partizan	Belgrade	SR Serbia	4th
Proleter Zrenjanin	Zrenjanin	SR Serbia	13th
Radnički Kragujevac	Kragujevac	SR Serbia	—
Radnički Niš	Niš	SR Serbia	15th
Red Star	Belgrade	SR Serbia	3rd
Rijeka	Rijeka	SR Croatia	—
Sarajevo	Sarajevo	SR Bosnia and Herzegovina	14th
Sloboda	Tuzla	SR Bosnia and Herzegovina	9th
Vardar	Skopje	SR Macedonia	11th
Velež	Mostar	SR Bosnia and Herzegovina	2nd
Vojvodina	Novi Sad	SR Serbia	12th
Željezničar	Sarajevo	SR Bosnia and Herzegovina	8th

== League table ==
Pos	Team	Pld	W	D	L	GF	GA	GD	Pts	Qualification or relegation
1	Hajduk Split (C)	34	20	8	6	56	29	+27	48	Qualification for European Cup first round
2	Vojvodina	34	16	13	5	53	32	+21	45	Qualification for UEFA Cup first round
3	Red Star Belgrade	34	16	8	10	61	44	+17	40	Qualification for UEFA Cup first round
4	Velež	34	15	9	10	62	35	+27	39	
5	Dinamo Zagreb	34	11	16	7	38	31	+7	38	
6	Partizan	34	13	10	11	55	49	+6	36	
7	Sloboda Tuzla	34	12	12	10	41	45	−4	36	
8	OFK Belgrade	34	11	10	13	40	40	0	32	
9	Željezničar	34	11	10	13	45	46	−1	32	
10	Radnički Niš	34	9	14	11	31	37	−6	32	
11	Čelik	34	10	11	13	35	41	−6	31	Qualification for Intertoto Cup
12	Olimpija	34	7	17	10	37	48	−11	31	
13	Sarajevo	34	8	14	12	38	40	−2	30	
14	Rijeka	34	9	12	13	33	43	−10	30	
15	Radnički Kragujevac	34	9	12	13	27	39	−12	30	
16	Vardar	34	7	15	12	35	41	−6	29	
17	Bor (R)	34	8	11	15	32	54	−22	27	Relegation to Yugoslav Second League
18	Proleter Zrenjanin (R)	34	7	12	15	27	52	−25	26	Relegation to Yugoslav Second League

Source: rsssf.org
Rules for classification: 1) points; 2) goal difference; 3) number of goals scored.
(C) Champions; (R) Relegated

== Results ==
Home \ Away	BOR	ČEL	DIN	HAJ	OFK	OLI	PAR	PRO	RDK	RNI	RSB	RIJ	SAR	SLO	VAR	VEL	VOJ	ŽEL
Bor		3–1	1–0	0–0	2–1	2–2	1–1	3–1	0–1	0–1	2–1	0–0	0–3	4–0	1–1	2–5	2–0	1–0
Čelik	3–0		0–2	0–1	1–1	4–0	2–1	4–1	0–0	1–1	1–1	2–2	0–0	1–0	3–0	1–0	1–1	1–0
Dinamo Zagreb	1–1	2–0		1–2	1–3	4–2	2–2	1–0	2–0	2–0	2–0	2–0	1–0	2–2	1–1	0–0	1–1	1–2
Hajduk Split	2–0	2–0	0–0		2–0	5–1	2–2	1–1	4–0	6–1	2–0	1–0	2–0	1–1	1–0	1–0	1–4	3–0
OFK Belgrade	0–0	4–2	0–1	0–2		0–0	1–1	4–1	2–1	0–0	1–1	2–0	5–0	1–0	1–0	1–3	2–2	1–0
Olimpija	2–0	0–0	1–1	2–1	3–0		2–1	1–1	0–0	1–2	1–1	3–0	1–0	2–2	0–0	2–0	1–1	1–1
Partizan	2–0	2–0	3–1	2–3	0–2	2–0		3–1	4–3	1–1	1–1	1–0	2–1	1–1	3–0	2–0	2–2	4–1
Proleter Zrenjanin	1–1	1–0	0–0	2–0	0–0	1–1	1–2		0–0	1–0	1–3	1–1	0–0	0–1	1–0	1–0	0–2	3–1
Radnički Kragujevac	1–1	0–1	0–1	0–0	0–0	2–0	2–0	2–1		0–0	0–3	1–0	1–0	2–1	2–1	3–2	0–2	1–1
Radnički Niš	0–0	1–0	0–0	0–1	1–0	2–2	0–0	0–0	3–0		2–0	4–1	1–1	2–1	0–0	0–2	1–1	1–1
Red Star	2–0	2–2	3–2	1–2	2–4	4–1	3–1	2–0	2–1	3–2		4–0	4–1	3–0	4–1	1–0	2–0	3–1
Rijeka	1–0	4–0	1–1	1–4	2–0	1–1	1–0	2–2	2–1	1–0	1–1		1–1	1–0	0–0	1–1	1–0	4–0
Sarajevo	5–0	2–2	0–0	1–1	2–0	3–1	2–1	1–2	1–1	2–0	0–0	1–1		3–1	1–1	3–1	0–1	0–2
Sloboda Tuzla	3–1	0–0	0–0	0–2	4–2	2–2	3–3	0–0	2–1	1–1	4–0	1–0	1–0		3–2	1–0	1–0	2–1
Vardar	3–0	2–0	1–1	1–1	2–1	1–0	2–4	5–0	0–0	1–0	1–1	1–1	1–0	1–1		2–2	1–2	1–1
Velež	2–1	3–0	0–0	5–0	1–0	4–0	2–0	4–0	1–1	2–3	3–1	4–2	2–2	5–0	2–2		3–0	1–0
Vojvodina	6–1	2–1	3–0	2–0	0–0	0–0	2–0	1–0	0–0	3–1	2–1	1–0	1–1	1–1	2–0	2–2		4–3
Željezničar	2–2	0–1	2–2	1–0	3–1	0–0	4–1	6–2	2–0	2–0	2–1	2–0	1–1	0–1	1–0	0–0	2–2	

Source: DataSoccer.it
Legend: Blue = home team win; Yellow = draw; Red = away team win.

== Winning squad ==
Champions: Hajduk Split
Player	League	
Player	Matches	Goals
Ivan Buljan	33	1
Slaviša Žungul	32	15
Jurica Jerković	32	9
Ivica Šurjak	30	7
Vedran Rožić	30	0
Dražen Mužinić	30	0
Vilson Džoni	29	2
Mario Boljat	27	2
Luka Peruzović	24	1
Željko Mijač	23	6
Mićun Jovanić	18	3
Šime Luketin	16	1
Rizah Mešković (goalkeeper)	16	0
Ivan Katalinić (goalkeeper)	13	0
Marin Kurtela	13	0
Ivica Matković	8	1
Branko Oblak	7	4
Nenad Šalov	7	1
Vjeran Simunić (goalkeeper)	7	0
Vladimir Smolčić	4	0
Dragan Holcer	4	0
Joško Duplančić	3	1
Head coach: Tomislav Ivić

== Top scorers ==
Rank	Player	Club	Goals
1	(Socialist Federal Republic of Yugoslavia) Boško Đorđević	Partizan	20
1	(Socialist Federal Republic of Yugoslavia) Dušan Savić	Red Star	20
3	(Socialist Federal Republic of Yugoslavia) Vahid Halilhodžić	Velež	16
4	(Socialist Federal Republic of Yugoslavia) Slaviša Žungul	Hajduk Split	15
5	(Socialist Federal Republic of Yugoslavia) Zoran Filipović	Red Star	14
5	(Socialist Federal Republic of Yugoslavia) Franjo Vladić	Velež	14
5	(Socialist Federal Republic of Yugoslavia) Momčilo Vukotić	Partizan	14
8	(Socialist Federal Republic of Yugoslavia) Božo Janković	Željezničar	12
9	(Socialist Federal Republic of Yugoslavia) Vančo Balevski	Vardar	11
9	(Socialist Federal Republic of Yugoslavia) Jovan Geca	Sloboda Tuzla	11
9	(Socialist Federal Republic of Yugoslavia) Zvonko Ivezić	Vojvodina	11
9	(Socialist Federal Republic of Yugoslavia) Josip Katalinski	Željezničar	11
9	(Socialist Federal Republic of Yugoslavia) Safet Sušić	Sarajevo	11
9	(Socialist Federal Republic of Yugoslavia) Slobodan Vučeković	Vojvodina	11

== Attendance ==
Club	Average home attendance	Average away attendance
Hajduk Split	20,294	23,294
Dinamo Zagreb	19,529	10,882
Red Star Belgrade	17,765	22,059
FK Partizan	16,412	19,529
FK Vojvodina	12,706	11,853
NK Rijeka	10,941	7,235
Radnički Kragujevac	10,941	6,912
FK Vardar	10,118	7,647
NK Olimpija	9,265	6,559
Radnički Niš	8,824	8,118
FK Sarajevo	8,706	10,741
FK Željezničar	8,529	9,882
FK Velež	7,941	12,417
Čelik Zenica	7,647	6,971
Proleter Zrenjanin	7,559	7,265
OFK Beograd	7,147	9,059
Sloboda Tuzla	5,941	7,882
FK Bor	5,206	7,706

- Overall league attendance per match: 10,859 spectators

== See also ==
- 1974–75 Yugoslav Second League
- 1974 Yugoslav Cup
- 1974–75 NK Dinamo Zagreb season
- 1974–75 NK Hajduk Split season
