= 1975–76 Yugoslav Cup =

1975–76 Yugoslav Football Cup
28th Marshal Tito Cup

Tournament details
- Country: Yugoslavia
- Dates: 3 September 1975 – 25 May 1976
- Teams: 32

Final positions
- Champions: Hajduk Split (5th title)
- Runners-up: Dinamo Zagreb
- Cup Winners' Cup: Hajduk Split

Tournament statistics
- Matches played: 31
- Goals scored: 96 (3.1 per match)
- Goals scored in penalty shoot-outs not included.

The 1975–76 Yugoslav Cup was the 28th season of the top football knockout competition in SFR Yugoslavia, the Yugoslav Cup (Serbo-Croatian: Kup Jugoslavije), also known as the "Marshal Tito Cup" (Kup Maršala Tita), since its establishment in 1946.

== Calendar ==
The Yugoslav Cup was a tournament for which clubs from all tiers of the football pyramid were eligible to enter. In addition, amateur teams put together by individual Yugoslav People's Army garrisons and various factories and industrial plants were also encouraged to enter, which meant that each cup edition could have several thousands of teams in its preliminary stages. These teams would play through a number of qualifying rounds before reaching the first round proper, in which they would be paired with top-flight teams.

After single-year tournaments in 1973 and 1974 which saw finals played on 29 November (Republic Day), in 1975–76 the tournament format returned to the more traditional September–May schedule, with the final moved to 25 May, to coincide with the end of the football league season and Youth Day celebrated on 25 May (a national holiday in Yugoslavia which also doubled as the official commemoration of Josip Broz Tito's birthday).

Since the cup winner was always meant to be decided on or around the national holiday at the JNA Stadium in capital Belgrade, and to avoid unfair home advantage this would give to Belgrade-based clubs, the Football Association of Yugoslavia adopted the rule in the late 1960s according to which the final could be played as a one-legged tie (in cases when both finalists are from outside Belgrade) or double-legged (when at least one of them is based in the capital), with the second leg always played in Belgrade. This rule was used for all cup finals from 1969 to 1988, when a single-legged final was adopted permanently.

Round	Legs	Date	Fixtures	Clubs
First round (round of 32)	Single	3 September 1975	16	32 → 16
Second round (round of 16)	Single	23 September 1975	8	16 → 8
Quarter-finals	Single	28 February 1976	4	8 → 4
Semi-finals	Single	7 April 1976	2	4 → 2
Final	Single	25 May 1976	1	2 → 1

== First round ==
In the following tables winning teams are marked in bold; teams from outside top level are marked in italic script.

Tie no	Home team	Score	Away team
1	**Čelik Zenica**	1–0	Partizan
2	**Famos Hrasnica**	2–0	Vardar
3	Jedinstvo Bihać	1–3	**Radnički Pirot**
4	**Lovćen Cetinje**	2–1	Proleter Zrenjanin
5	OFK Belgrade	0–2	**Dinamo Zagreb**
6	Olimpija Ljubljana	0–1	**Hajduk Split**
7	Osijek	0–1	**Radnički Niš**
8	Prishtina	2–3	**Istra Pula**
9	**Red Star**	3–1	Rijeka
10	Sarajevo	0–4	**NK Zagreb**
11	**Sloboda Tuzla**	5–0	AFK Ada
12	**Šumadija Aranđelovac**	1–1 (5–4 p)	Bor
13	Timok Zaječar	0–2	**Željezničar Sarajevo**
14	**Vardar II**	4–1	Mura
15	**Velež**	2–1	Radnički Kragujevac
16	**Vojvodina**	5–1	Cement Beočin

== Second round ==
Tie no	Home team	Score	Away team
1	**Dinamo Zagreb**	3–1	Sloboda Tuzla
2	Istra Pula	0–1	**Famos Hrasnica**
3	**NK Zagreb**	1–0	Velež
4	Radnički Niš	1–6	**Hajduk Split**
5	**Radnički Pirot**	4–2	Red Star
6	**Šumadija Aranđelovac**	5–2	Lovćen Cetinje
7	**Vojvodina**	3–1 (a.e.t.)	Vardar II
8	**Željezničar Sarajevo**	1–0	Čelik Zenica

== Quarter-finals ==
Tie no	Home team	Score	Away team
1	**Dinamo Zagreb**	2–0	Radnički Pirot
2	**Famos Hrasnica**	0–0 (5–4 p)	Vojvodina
3	**Hajduk Split**	1–0 (a.e.t.)	Šumadija Aranđelovac
4	**NK Zagreb**	2–1	Željezničar Sarajevo

== Semi-finals ==
Tie no	Home team	Score	Away team
1	**Hajduk Split**	2–0	Famos Hrasnica
2	NK Zagreb	2–4	**Dinamo Zagreb**

== Final ==
25 May 1976

Hajduk Split	1–0 (a.e.t.)	Dinamo Zagreb
Šurjak 105'

Red Star Stadium, Belgrade
Attendance: 60,000
Referee: Marijan Rauš (Varaždin)

**Hajduk Split**	**Dinamo Zagreb**

HAJDUK SPLIT:
GK	**1**	(Socialist Federal Republic of Yugoslavia) Ivan Katalinić
DF	**2**	(Socialist Federal Republic of Yugoslavia) Mario Boljat
DF	**3**	(Socialist Federal Republic of Yugoslavia) Vedran Rožić	Substituted off
DF	**4**	(Socialist Federal Republic of Yugoslavia) Šime Luketin
DF	**5**	(Socialist Federal Republic of Yugoslavia) Luka Peruzović
DF	**6**	(Socialist Federal Republic of Yugoslavia) Ivan Buljan
FW	**7**	(Socialist Federal Republic of Yugoslavia) Slaviša Žungul
MF	**8**	(Socialist Federal Republic of Yugoslavia) Dražen Mužinić
MF	**9**	(Socialist Federal Republic of Yugoslavia) Željko Mijač	Substituted off
FW	**10**	(Socialist Federal Republic of Yugoslavia) Jurica Jerković
MF	**11**	(Socialist Federal Republic of Yugoslavia) Ivica Šurjak
Substitutes:
DF	?	(Socialist Federal Republic of Yugoslavia) Vilson Džoni	Substituted on
MF	?	(Socialist Federal Republic of Yugoslavia) Vančo Balevski	Substituted on
Manager:
(Socialist Federal Republic of Yugoslavia) Tomislav Ivić

DINAMO ZAGREB:
GK	**1**	(Socialist Federal Republic of Yugoslavia) Želimir Stinčić
DF	**2**	(Socialist Federal Republic of Yugoslavia) Srećko Huljić
DF	**3**	(Socialist Federal Republic of Yugoslavia) Čedomir Jovičević
MF	**4**	(Socialist Federal Republic of Yugoslavia) Velimir Zajec
MF	**5**	(Socialist Federal Republic of Yugoslavia) Filip Blašković
DF	**6**	(Socialist Federal Republic of Yugoslavia) Ivica Miljković
FW	**7**	(Socialist Federal Republic of Yugoslavia) Ivica Senzen
DF	**8**	(Socialist Federal Republic of Yugoslavia) Džemal Mustedanagić
FW	**9**	(Socialist Federal Republic of Yugoslavia) Zlatko Kranjčar
MF	**10**	(Socialist Federal Republic of Yugoslavia) Rajko Janjanin	Substituted off
FW	**11**	(Socialist Federal Republic of Yugoslavia) Drago Vabec
Substitutes:
FW	?	(Socialist Federal Republic of Yugoslavia) Mario Bonić	Substituted on
Manager:
(Socialist Federal Republic of Yugoslavia) Mirko Bazić

== See also ==
- 1975–76 Yugoslav First League
- 1975–76 Yugoslav Second League
