= Jurica Jerković =

Croatian footballer (1950–2019)

Personal information
- Date of birth: 25 February 1950
- Place of birth: Split, FPR Yugoslavia
- Date of death: 3 June 2019 (aged 69)
- Place of death: Split, Croatia
- Height: 1.75 m (5 ft 9 in)
- Position: Attacking midfielder

Youth career
- 1965–1967: Hajduk Split
- 1967–1968: → RNK Split (loan)

Senior career*
Years	Team	Apps	(Gls)
1968–1978	Hajduk Split	250	(74)
1978–1985	FC Zürich	215	(57)
1985–1986	Lugano	30	(9)
Total		495	(140)

International career
1970–1982	Yugoslavia	43	(6)
- * Club domestic league appearances and goals

Jurica "Jure" Jerković (25 February 1950 – 3 June 2019) was a Croatian footballer who played as an attacking midfielder. During his time with Hajduk Split in the 1970s, he was known for his amazing playmaker skills and for his romantic approach to football. He captained the Hajduk golden generation of that time under coach Tomislav Ivić which is considered to be the best Hajduk squad of all time.

== Club career ==
=== Hajduk Split ===
Born in Split, SR Croatia, FPR Yugoslavia, Jerković started his youth and senior career at Hajduk Split. In the youth academy he was trained by Tomislav Ivić who would later become his senior manager. He went on a one-year loan to RNK Split. After finishing the loan in 1968, he went back to Hajduk where he made his senior professional debut. Jerković was a part of a new Hajduk generation created by Tomislav Ivić that would dominate the Yugoslav First League during the 1970s.

Jerković won his first trophy in 1971 when Hajduk won the Yugoslav championship. It was Hajduk's first league trophy in 16 years. In 1972 Ivić took charge of Hajduk and Jerković won his first Yugoslav Cup. He won the cup again in the following season under Branko Zebec. In 1973 the "old guard" of Hajduk decided to leave which included players like Nadoveza, Hlevnjak and Vukčević. Tomislav Ivić returned to manage Hajduk and with the young forces he created a few years ago in the academy he was ready to dominate the league. In 1974 Hajduk played the last game of the season against OFK Beograd and they needed a win to secure the championship. Jurica Jerković scored the 2nd goal in the 89th minute and won the championship with his team. Hajduk won the "double" for the first time in their history when they won the 1974 Yugoslav Cup alongside the championship.

At that time Jurica Jerković became the captain of the team. Jerković-Šurjak-Žungul became the fantastic trio that created the most goals for the squad. In 1975 Jerković won another Yugoslav championship which was Hajduk's first time that they managed to defend their previous title. In that season he scored his most beautiful goal in his career against FK Velež. The next season Hajduk fought FK Partizan over the championship. 2 rounds before the end of the season Hajduk faced Partizan in Belgrade. Thanks to the brilliance of Jerković and his teammates they defeated Partizan 6–1 but in the last round Partizan won the championship with the help of referee Maksimović. Jerković still won the Yugoslav Cup that season. In 1977 Jerković won his 5th in a row Yugoslav Cup. Jerković won the Sportske novosti Yellow Shirt award in 1971 and in 1976.

Jerković played in a lot of UEFA competitions with Hajduk. He played in the 1973 UEFA Cup Winners' Cup semi-final where they were kicked out by Leeds United. He played in the 1974 European Cup disaster against AS Saint-Étienne where Hajduk lost 1–5 in the second leg after defeating them 4–1 in the first leg. His biggest success was the 1975 European Cup quarter-final where they were defeated by PSV Eindhoven on a 2–3 aggregate. In his last season for Hajduk he lost against Rapid Vienna on penalties in the Cup Winners' Cup quarter-finals. Jerković left Hajduk in 1978 and went to FC Zürich.

Jurica Jerković was described as one of the last romantic footballers around these parts. He was loved by the fans and many still believe today that he was one of the best footballers in Hajduk history. His number 10 is still today given to only the best players in Hajduk and those who decide to take it must prove that they are worth it. He made 529 appearances for Hajduk and scored 219 goals. He is the 6th most capped player in Hajduk history. In 2011, he was chosen in the Hajduk "Team of the century" which represents the best 11 players since 1911.

=== FC Zürich ===
In 1978, Jerković moved to FC Zürich at the age of 28. During his time there he won the Swiss championship in 1981 and the Swiss League Cup the same year. He played in the 1981–82 European Cup where he scored a hattrick in the First round against Dynamo Berlin. He won the Swiss Foreign Footballer of the Year award in 1979, 1982 and 1983. He probably went into history as one of the best foreign players in the club. In 1985 at the age of 35 he left Zürich for FC Lugano where he played until his retirement in 1987.

== International career ==
Jerković made his international debut for Yugoslavia on 12 April 1970 against Hungary in a friendly match. He scored his first goal in a 2–0 victory against the Netherlands in the 1972 UEFA Euro qualifiers. In July 1971 he played at Pelé's farewell match where he scored an amazing goal from a long distance. He played three matches in the 1974 FIFA World Cup in which Yugoslavia passed to the second round. He helped his team reach the UEFA Euro 1976 where he played in both matches but Yugoslavia lost them both. He played his last match for Yugoslavia on 29 November 1981 against Greece in the 1982 FIFA World Cup qualifiers. He was selected in the Yugoslav squad for the 1982 FIFA World Cup but without any appearance. After the 1982 World Cup he retired from the national squad. He made 43 appearances and scored 6 goals for Yugoslavia.

== Career statistic ==
Goal	Date	Venue	Opponent	Score	Result	Competition
1	4 April 1971	Stadion Stari plac, Split	Netherlands	1 – 0	2 – 0	1972 UEFA Euro qualifiers
2	18 July 1971	Estádio do Maracanã, Rio de Janeiro	Brazil	2 – 2	2 – 2	Pelé's farewell match
3	29 June 1972	Estádio Independência, Belo Horizonte	Scotland	2 – 2	2 – 2	Exhibition game
4	29 May 1974	Sóstói Stadion, Székesfehérvár	Hungary	2 – 0	2 – 4	Exhibition game
5	23 March 1977	Stadion JNA, Belgrade	Soviet Union	2 – 3	2 – 4	Exhibition game
6	29 November 1981	Karaiskakis Stadium, Athens	Greece	2 – 1	2 – 1	World Cup 1982 Qualifying

== Honours ==
Hajduk Split

- Yugoslav First League: 1971, 1974, 1975
- Yugoslav Cup: 1972, 1973, 1974, 1976, 1977

FC Zürich

- Swiss Super League: 1981
- Swiss League Cup: 1981

Individual

- Sportske novosti Yellow Shirt award: 1971, 1976
- Swiss Foreign Footballer of the Year: 1979, 1982, 1983
