= 1974 Yugoslav Cup =

1974 Yugoslav Football Cup
27th Marshal Tito Cup

Tournament details
- Country: Yugoslavia
- Dates: 14 August – 29 November
- Teams: 32

Final positions
- Champions: Hajduk Split (4th title)
- Runners-up: Borac Banja Luka
- Cup Winners' Cup: Borac Banja Luka

Tournament statistics
- Matches played: 31
- Goals scored: 83 (2.68 per match)
- Goals scored in penalty shoot-outs not included.

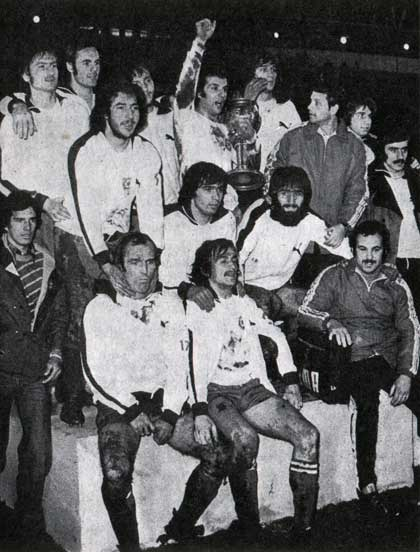
The Hajduk Split line-up that won the 1974 Yugoslav Cup. In the top row from left to right: Šime Luketin, Rizah Mešković, Vedran Rožić, captain Jurica Jerković, Ivica Šurjak, manager Tomislav Ivić, Željko Mijač and Ivan Katalinić. In the middle row: Dražen Mužinić, Slaviša Žungul and Ivan Buljan. In the bottom row: Branko Oblak, Mario Boljat and the physiotherapist Rožić.

The 1974 Yugoslav Cup was the 27th season of the top football knockout competition in SFR Yugoslavia, the Yugoslav Cup (Serbo-Croatian: Kup Jugoslavije), also known as the "Marshal Tito Cup" (Kup Maršala Tita), since its establishment in 1946.

== Calendar ==
The Yugoslav Cup was a tournament for which clubs from all tiers of the football pyramid were eligible to enter. In addition, amateur teams put together by individual Yugoslav People's Army garrisons and various factories and industrial plants were also encouraged to enter, which meant that each cup edition could have several thousands of teams in its preliminary stages. These teams would play through a number of qualifying rounds before reaching the first round proper, in which they would be paired with top-flight teams.

Unlike most cup finals played since the late 1950s which had been traditionally scheduled to coincide with the end of the football league season and Youth Day celebrated on 25 May (a national holiday in Yugoslavia which also doubled as the official commemoration of Josip Broz Tito's birthday), the 1973 and 1974 cups were played over only four months, with finals played in November in capital Belgrade, to coincide with Republic Day on 29 November.

Since the final was always meant to be determined on or around a national holiday at the JNA Stadium in capital Belgrade, and to avoid unfair advantage this would give to Belgrade-based clubs, the Football Association of Yugoslavia adopted the rule in the late 1960s which said that the final could be played as a one-legged tie (in cases when both finalists are from outside Belgrade) or double-legged (when at least one of them is based the capital), with the second leg always played in Belgrade. This rule was used for all eight cup finals involving Belgrade clubs played from 1970 to 1985.

Round	Legs	Date	Fixtures	Clubs
First round (round of 32)	Single	14 August 1974	16	32 → 16
Second round (round of 16)	Single	11 September 1974	8	16 → 8
Quarter-finals	Single	16 October 1974	4	8 → 4
Semi-finals	Single	13 November 1974	2	4 → 2
Final	Single	29 November 1974	1	2 → 1

== First round ==
In the following tables winning teams are marked in bold; teams from outside top level are marked in italic script.

Tie no	Home team	Score	Away team
1	**Bačka Subotica**	1–0	Neretva
2	Bokelj	0–1 (a.e.t.)	**Olimpija Ljubljana**
3	**Borac Travnik**	2–1 (a.e.t.)	Metalac G. Milanovac
4	**Dinamo Zagreb**	2–0	Radnički Kragujevac
5	**Hajduk Split**	3–0	Proleter Zrenjanin
6	**Maribor**	1–1 (5–4 p)	Bor
7	Novi Sad	0–2	**Velež**
8	**OFK Belgrade**	1–0	Karlovac
9	**Rabotnički**	4–0	Čelik Zenica
10	Red Star	1–4	**Borac Banja Luka**
11	**Sarajevo**	2–0	Igman Ilidža
12	**Sloboda Tuzla**	2–1	Vojvodina
13	**Timok Zaječar**	1–0	Radnički Niš
14	**Vardar**	1–0	Osijek
15	**NK Zagreb**	2–0	Partizan
16	**Željezničar Sarajevo**	4–0	Prishtina

== Second round ==
Tie no	Home team	Score	Away team
1	Bačka Subotica	0–2	**Hajduk Split**
2	**Borac Banja Luka**	0–0 (4–2 p)	Sarajevo
3	**Dinamo Zagreb**	1–0	Borac Travnik
4	**OFK Belgrade**	2–1	Maribor
5	**Olimpija Ljubljana**	1–1 (6–5 p)	Rabotnički
6	Timok Zaječar	2–5	**Željezničar Sarajevo**
7	**Vardar**	3–0	Sloboda Tuzla
8	**Velež**	2–1	NK Zagreb

== Quarter-finals ==
Tie no	Home team	Score	Away team
1	**Hajduk Split**	3–0	OFK Belgrade
2	Olimpija Ljubljana	2–2 (6–7 p)	**Borac Banja Luka**
3	**Vardar**	2–0	Dinamo Zagreb
4	**Željezničar Sarajevo**	4–3 (a.e.t.)	Velež

== Semi-finals ==
Tie no	Home team	Score	Away team
1	**Borac Banja Luka**	2–1	Željezničar Sarajevo
2	**Hajduk Split**	5–0	Vardar

== Final ==
29 November 1974

Hajduk Split	1–0	Borac Banja Luka
Boljat 39'

Stadion JNA, Belgrade
Attendance: 20,000
Referee: Miloš Čajić (Belgrade)

**Hajduk Split**	**Borac Banja Luka**

GK	**1**	(Socialist Federal Republic of Yugoslavia) Rizah Mešković
DF	**2**	(Socialist Federal Republic of Yugoslavia) Marin Kurtela	Substituted off
DF	**3**	(Socialist Federal Republic of Yugoslavia) Vedran Rožić
DF	**4**	(Socialist Federal Republic of Yugoslavia) Mario Boljat
DF	**5**	(Socialist Federal Republic of Yugoslavia) Šime Luketin
DF	**6**	(Socialist Federal Republic of Yugoslavia) Ivan Buljan
FW	**7**	(Socialist Federal Republic of Yugoslavia) Slaviša Žungul
MF	**8**	(Socialist Federal Republic of Yugoslavia) Dražen Mužinić
MF	**9**	(Socialist Federal Republic of Yugoslavia) Branko Oblak
FW	**10**	(Socialist Federal Republic of Yugoslavia) Jurica Jerković (c)
MF	**11**	(Socialist Federal Republic of Yugoslavia) Ivica Šurjak
Substitutes:
DF	?	(Socialist Federal Republic of Yugoslavia) Joško Duplančić	Substituted on
Manager:
(Socialist Federal Republic of Yugoslavia) Tomislav Ivić

GK	**1**	(Socialist Federal Republic of Yugoslavia) Marijan Jantoljak
DF	**2**	(Socialist Federal Republic of Yugoslavia) Milan Vukelja
DF	**3**	(Socialist Federal Republic of Yugoslavia) Hikmet Kušmić
DF	**4**	(Socialist Federal Republic of Yugoslavia) Zvonimir Vidačak
DF	**5**	(Socialist Federal Republic of Yugoslavia) Mario Brnjac
MF	**6**	(Socialist Federal Republic of Yugoslavia) Dževad Kreso
MF	**7**	(Socialist Federal Republic of Yugoslavia) Dušan Jurković	Substituted off
MF	**8**	(Socialist Federal Republic of Yugoslavia) Zoran Smilevski
FW	**9**	(Socialist Federal Republic of Yugoslavia) Miloš Cetina	Substituted off
FW	**10**	(Socialist Federal Republic of Yugoslavia) Dragan Marjanović
FW	**11**	(Socialist Federal Republic of Yugoslavia) Abid Kovačević (c)
Substitutes:
MF	?	(Socialist Federal Republic of Yugoslavia) Nenad Lazić	Substituted on
FW	?	(Socialist Federal Republic of Yugoslavia) M. Ivanović	Substituted on
Manager:
(Socialist Federal Republic of Yugoslavia) Boris Marović

== See also ==
- 1974–75 Yugoslav First League
- 1974–75 Yugoslav Second League
