= Luka Peruzović =

Croatian football player and manager (born 1952)

Personal information
- Date of birth: 26 February 1952 (age 74)
- Place of birth: Split, FPR Yugoslavia
- Position: Defender

Senior career*
Years	Team	Apps	(Gls)
1969–1980	Hajduk Split	233	(9)
1980–1986	Anderlecht	166	(5)
1986–1988	Hajduk Split	64	(1)
Total		453	(15)

International career
1974–1983	Yugoslavia	18	(0)

Managerial career
- 1990: Hajduk Split
- 1991–1992: Charleroi
- 1992–1993: Anderlecht
- 1993–1994: Genk
- 1995: Marseille
- 1995–1997: Charleroi
- 1997: Gençlerbirliği
- 1998: Standard Liège
- 1999: Charleroi
- 2002–2004: Al Sadd
- 2004–2005: Al-Ittihad
- 2005–2006: Bahrain
- 2008: Al-Shaab
- 2009–2010: Sfaxien
- 2011: Charleroi
- 2013: Charleroi
- * Club domestic league appearances and goals

Luka Peruzović (born 26 February 1952) is a Croatian football coach and former player, who managed Belgium's Standard Liège, Charleroi and Anderlecht and Qatar's Al Sadd. He also holds a Belgian citizenship.

== Club career ==
As a player, Peruzović played over 400 games for Hajduk Split in all competitions before following his former coach Tomislav Ivić to Anderlecht in 1980. Playing as centre-back or sweeper he helped them reach the 1982 European Cup semi-final and won the 1983 UEFA Cup Final against Benfica.

== International career ==
Peruzović made his debut for Yugoslavia in a July 1974 World Cup Finals match against Sweden, coming on as a 78th-minute substitute for Miroslav Pavlović, and earned a total of 18 caps, scoring no goals. He also played for his country in the 1976 European championship. His final international was a December 1983 European championship qualification match against Bulgaria.

== Managerial career ==
After retiring he worked as a coach in Croatia, Belgium, France and Turkey. In December 2004, he was appointed manager of Al Ittihad, but lasted only three months until March 2005. He then coached Bahrain national team in their 2006 World Cup qualifiers, losing out the playoff to Trinidad and Tobago. He was dismissed by the Bahraini FA in February 2006.

He was named as the manager of Tunisian team CS Sfax in 2009, before returning to Belgium to take charge of Charleroi, his fourth stint at the club.

== Personal life ==
Despite popular belief, Peruzović is not the younger brother of WWE wrestler Josip Hrvoje Peruzović, better known as Nikolai Volkoff.

== Honours ==
=== Player ===
Hajduk Split

- Yugoslav First League: 1970–71, 1973–74, 1974–75, 1978–79
- Yugoslav Cup: 1971–72, 1973, 1974, 1975–76, 1976–77, 1986–87

Anderlecht

- Belgian First Division: 1980–81, 1984–85, 1985–86
- Belgian Supercup: 1985
- UEFA Cup: 1982–83; runner-up 1983–84
- Jules Pappaert Cup: 1983, 1985
- Bruges Matins: 1985

=== Manager ===
Anderlecht

- Belgian First Division: 1992–93

Marseille

- Ligue 2: 1994–95

Al Sadd

- Qatar Stars League: 2003–04
- Qatar Cup: 2003

CS Sfaxien

- Ligue 2: 1994–95
- North African Cup Winners Cup: 2009

Charleroi

- Belgian Second Division: 2011–12
