= 1973 Yugoslav Cup =

1973 Yugoslav Football Cup
26th Marshal Tito Cup

Tournament details
- Country: Yugoslavia
- Dates: 11 August – 28 November
- Teams: 32

Final positions
- Champions: Hajduk Split (3rd title)
- Runners-up: Red Star
- Cup Winners' Cup: Red Star

Tournament statistics
- Matches played: 32
- Goals scored: 110 (3.44 per match)
- Goals scored in penalty shoot-outs not included.

The 1973 Yugoslav Cup was the 26th season of the top football knockout competition in SFR Yugoslavia, the Yugoslav Cup (Serbo-Croatian: Kup Jugoslavije), also known as the "Marshal Tito Cup" (Kup Maršala Tita), since its establishment in 1946.

== Calendar ==
The Yugoslav Cup was a tournament for which clubs from all tiers of the football pyramid were eligible to enter. In addition, amateur teams put together by individual Yugoslav People's Army garrisons and various factories and industrial plants were also encouraged to enter, which meant that each cup edition could have several thousands of teams in its preliminary stages. These teams would play through a number of qualifying rounds before reaching the first round proper, in which they would be paired with top-flight teams.

Unlike most cup finals played since the late 1950s which had been traditionally scheduled to coincide with the end of the football league season and Youth Day celebrated on 25 May (a national holiday in Yugoslavia which also doubled as the official commemoration of Josip Broz Tito's birthday), the 1973 and 1974 cups were played over only four months, with finals played in November in capital Belgrade, to coincide with Republic Day on 29 November.

Since the final was always meant to be determined on or around a national holiday at the JNA Stadium in capital Belgrade, and to avoid unfair advantage this would give to Belgrade-based clubs, the Football Association of Yugoslavia adopted the rule in the late 1960s which said that the final could be played as a one-legged tie (in cases when both finalists are from outside Belgrade) or double-legged (when at least one of them is based the capital), with the second leg always played in Belgrade. This rule was used for all eight cup finals involving Belgrade clubs played from 1970 to 1985.

Round	Legs	Date played	Fixtures	Clubs
First round (round of 32)	Single	12 August 1973	16	32 → 16
Second round (round of 16)	Single	29 August 1973	8	16 → 8
Quarter-finals	Single	3 October 1973	4	8 → 4
Semi-finals	Single	14 November 1973	2	4 → 2
Final	Double	21 and 28 November 1973	2	2 → 1

== First round ==
In the following tables winning teams are marked in bold; teams from outside top level are marked in italic script.

Tie no	Home team	Score	Away team
1	Borac Bosanski Šamac	0–4	**OFK Belgrade**
2	**Čelik Zenica**	3–2	Bor
3	Hajduk Kula	0–5	**Šumadija Aranđelovac**
4	**Hajduk Split**	5–1	Vardar
5	**Maribor**	4–0	Lovćen Cetinje
6	Ohrid	3–4	**Borac Banja Luka**
7	**Red Star**	2–0	Dinamo Pančevo
8	**Rudar Kakanj**	1–1 (5–4 p)	Sarajevo
9	Sloboda Tuzla	0–1	**Partizan**
10	**RNK Split**	1–0	Spartak Subotica
11	**Timok Zaječar**	3–1	Dinamo Zagreb
12	Trepça	0–2	**Radnički Niš**
13	**Velež**	1–0	Belišće
14	**Vojvodina**	1–0	Sloboda Titovo Užice
15	**NK Zagreb**	3–0	Sutjeska Nikšić
16	**Željezničar Sarajevo**	3–0	Olimpija Ljubljana

== Second round ==
Tie no	Home team	Score	Away team
1	**Borac Banja Luka**	2–0	Velež
2	Čelik Zenica	0–1	**Red Star**
3	**Maribor**	3–1	Rudar Kakanj
4	**OFK Belgrade**	3–1	Vojvodina
5	Partizan	1–4	**NK Zagreb**
6	RNK Split	0–5	**Hajduk Split**
7	Šumadija Aranđelovac	0–1	**Radnički Niš**
8	Timok Zaječar	1–8	**Željezničar Sarajevo**

== Quarter-finals ==
Tie no	Home team	Score	Away team
1	**Hajduk Split**	3–0 (a.e.t.)	Borac Banja Luka
2	OFK Belgrade	1–3	**Željezničar Sarajevo**
3	Radnički Niš	0–1	**Red Star**
4	**NK Zagreb**	3–1	Maribor

== Semi-finals ==
Tie no	Home team	Score	Away team
1	**Red Star**	7–2	NK Zagreb
2	Željezničar Sarajevo	1–1 (3–4 p)	**Hajduk Split**

== Final ==
=== First leg ===
21 November 1973

Hajduk Split	1–1	Red Star
Žungul 57'		Karasi 17'

Stadion pod Marjanom, Split
Attendance: 25,000
Referee: Velibor Ljujić (Belgrade)

HAJDUK SPLIT:
GK	(Socialist Federal Republic of Yugoslavia) Ivan Katalinić
DF	(Socialist Federal Republic of Yugoslavia) Luka Peruzović
DF	(Socialist Federal Republic of Yugoslavia) Dragan Holcer (c)
DF	(Socialist Federal Republic of Yugoslavia) Ivan Buljan
DF	(Socialist Federal Republic of Yugoslavia) Vedran Rožić
MF	(Socialist Federal Republic of Yugoslavia) Dražen Mužinić
MF	(Socialist Federal Republic of Yugoslavia) Branko Oblak	Substituted off
MF	(Socialist Federal Republic of Yugoslavia) Ivica Šurjak
FW	(Socialist Federal Republic of Yugoslavia) Jurica Jerković
FW	(Socialist Federal Republic of Yugoslavia) Mićun Jovanić	Substituted off
FW	(Socialist Federal Republic of Yugoslavia) Slaviša Žungul
Substitutes:
MF	(Socialist Federal Republic of Yugoslavia) Željko Mijač	Substituted on
DF	(Socialist Federal Republic of Yugoslavia) Vilson Džoni	Substituted on
Manager:
(Socialist Federal Republic of Yugoslavia) Tomislav Ivić

RED STAR:
GK	(Socialist Federal Republic of Yugoslavia) Ognjen Petrović
DF	(Socialist Federal Republic of Yugoslavia) Nikola Jovanović
DF	(Socialist Federal Republic of Yugoslavia) Kiril Dojčinovski
DF	(Socialist Federal Republic of Yugoslavia) Miroslav Pavlović
MF	(Socialist Federal Republic of Yugoslavia) Vladislav Bogićević
MF	(Socialist Federal Republic of Yugoslavia) Petar Baralić
MF	(Socialist Federal Republic of Yugoslavia) Jovan Aćimović
MF	(Socialist Federal Republic of Yugoslavia) Vladimir Petrović
FW	(Socialist Federal Republic of Yugoslavia) Vojin Lazarević
FW	(Socialist Federal Republic of Yugoslavia) Aleksandar Panajotović
FW	(Socialist Federal Republic of Yugoslavia) Stanislav Karasi
Manager:
(Socialist Federal Republic of Yugoslavia) Miljan Miljanić

=== Second leg ===
28 November 1973

Red Star	1–2	Hajduk Split
Panajotović 87'		Žungul 27'; Jerković 67'

Stadion Crvena Zvezda, Belgrade
Attendance: 10,000
Referee: Željko Kurir (Split)

RED STAR:
GK	(Socialist Federal Republic of Yugoslavia) Ognjen Petrović
DF	(Socialist Federal Republic of Yugoslavia) Nikola Jovanović	Substituted off
DF	(Socialist Federal Republic of Yugoslavia) Kiril Dojčinovski
DF	(Socialist Federal Republic of Yugoslavia) Miroslav Pavlović
MF	(Socialist Federal Republic of Yugoslavia) Vladislav Bogićević
MF	(Socialist Federal Republic of Yugoslavia) Petar Baralić
MF	(Socialist Federal Republic of Yugoslavia) Jovan Aćimović
MF	(Socialist Federal Republic of Yugoslavia) Vladimir Petrović
FW	(Socialist Federal Republic of Yugoslavia) Vojin Lazarević
FW	(Socialist Federal Republic of Yugoslavia) Aleksandar Panajotović
FW	(Socialist Federal Republic of Yugoslavia) Stanislav Karasi
Substitutes:
MF	(Socialist Federal Republic of Yugoslavia) Zoran Antonijević	Substituted on
Manager:
(Socialist Federal Republic of Yugoslavia) Miljan Miljanić

HAJDUK SPLIT:
GK	(Socialist Federal Republic of Yugoslavia) Rizah Mešković
DF	(Socialist Federal Republic of Yugoslavia) Luka Peruzović	Substituted off
DF	(Socialist Federal Republic of Yugoslavia) Dragan Holcer (c)
DF	(Socialist Federal Republic of Yugoslavia) Ivan Buljan
DF	(Socialist Federal Republic of Yugoslavia) Vedran Rožić
DF	(Socialist Federal Republic of Yugoslavia) Vilson Džoni
MF	(Socialist Federal Republic of Yugoslavia) Dražen Mužinić
MF	(Socialist Federal Republic of Yugoslavia) Branko Oblak
MF	(Socialist Federal Republic of Yugoslavia) Ivica Šurjak
FW	(Socialist Federal Republic of Yugoslavia) Jurica Jerković
FW	(Socialist Federal Republic of Yugoslavia) Slaviša Žungul
Substitutes:
DF	(Socialist Federal Republic of Yugoslavia) Mario Boljat	Substituted on
Manager:
(Socialist Federal Republic of Yugoslavia) Tomislav Ivić

== See also ==
- 1973–74 Yugoslav First League
- 1973–74 Yugoslav Second League
