= Jovan Geca =

Serbian footballer (1953–1999)

Personal information
- Full name: Jovan Geca
- Date of birth: 19 January 1953
- Place of birth: Zrenjanin, SR Serbia, SFR Yugoslavia
- Place of death: 7 December 1999 (aged 46)
- Position: Forward

Youth career
- Bilećanin Sečanj

Senior career*
Years	Team	Apps	(Gls)
1971–1972	Sloga Doboj		
1972–1980	Sloboda Tuzla	178	(53)
1980–1985	Proleter Zrenjanin	105	(25)
1985–1989	Budućnost Banovići		
- * Club domestic league appearances and goals

Jovan Geca (Serbian Cyrillic: Јован Геца; 12 March 1953 – 7 December 1999) was a Yugoslav footballer who played as forward. He was known for his career with Sloboda Tuzla throughout the 1970s, being one of the club's all-time highest goalscorers.

== Career ==
Geca spent his initial career with Bilećanin Sečanj and Sloboda Doboj throughout the early 1970s before reaching the top-flight of Yugoslav football with Sloboda Tuzla during the 1972–73 Yugoslav First League where the club had a strong season at 6th place. The following 1973–74 Yugoslav First League was by contrast, highly competitive due to many clubs tying for points and assuming the championship title at some point. Due to the nature of that edition of the tournament, Sloboda Tuzla was in a troubled situation with only 11 points by contrast to other clubs. Thus, the upcoming match against Dinamo Zagreb on 25 November 1973 was a pivotal one as it would decide if the club would remain in the top-flight or if they would get relegated to the Yugoslav Second League. Throughout the match, neither team would score a goal despite many opportunities from both sides to score a goal. During the second half of the match, club manager Josip Duvančić decided to swap Bosnian midfielder Ešref Jašarević for Geca. This decision would ultimately pay off as in the 60th minute of the match, Geca was fouled in the right leg and was granted a penalty kick. As the ball initially hit the right post, his teammate Mustafa Hukić went to retrieve the ball before Dinamo goalkeeper Želimir Stinčić went to retrieve the ball. After he threw the ball though, Fuad Mulahasanović retrieved the ball and passed it to Geca who would score the only winning goal in the 60th minute. This success would kickstart a series of six consecutive victories and would ultimately save the club from relegation that season.

His success with the club would continue into the mid-1970s as during the final matchday of the 1974–75 Yugoslav First League, alongside his teammate Jusuf Hatunić, contributed to the 2–0 victory against Partizan.

On 27 May 1977, during Matchday 30 of the 1976–77 Yugoslav First League, Geca scored a hat-trick against Partizan which would confirm the comeback of the Red-and-blacks and make them successfully qualify for the 1977–78 UEFA Cup where they wouldn't make past the group stage against Las Palmas.
