= Dušan Šujica =

Bosnian Serb footballer (1945–2016)

Dušan Šujica Душан Шуица
Personal information
- Full name: Dušan Šujica
- Date of birth: 1947
- Place of birth: Lipjan, Kosovo, Serbia, Yugoslavia
- Date of death: 13 January 2019 (aged 71–72)
- Place of death: Skopje, Skopje Statistical Region, North Macedonia
- Position: Forward

Senior career*
Years	Team	Apps	(Gls)
1966–1973	Prishtina	177	(96)
1973–1977	Vardar	171	(71)
1977–19??	Liria Prizren		
- Sloga Lipljan
- * Club domestic league appearances and goals

Dušan Šujica (Macedonian: Душан Шуица; Albanian: Dushan Shuica; 1947 – 13 January 2019) was a Kosovan-born Macedonian footballer. Playing as a forward for Vardar throughout the 1970s, he was distinguished for being the top scorer for the club throughout two seasons.

== Career ==
Šujica began his career within Prishtina, notably achieving the title of top scorer of the 1972–73 Yugoslav Second League with 33 registered goals. The news of his success would catch the attention of clubs within the Yugoslav First League and in 1973, he moved to play for Vardar located in North Macedonia. Throughout this era, he played alongside other players such as Lazar Plachkov, Gyore Jovanovski and Krsto Vrbica with Šujica being frequently compared to German forward Gerd Müller. By that point, he made 171 appearances for the club and scored 71 goals with 85 and 22 of those goals being within the domestic league.

He found enough success to where he was the top goalscorer for the club in the 1973–74 and the 1975–76 seasons when the club was relegated from the top-flight of Yugoslav football. He also participated in the 1974 Balkans Cup where the club reached runners-up. He would remain with Vardar until the 1976–77 Yugoslav Second League when he switched over to Liria Prizren.

== Personal life ==
Šujica later got married in Skopje and had two daughters there. In 2012, alongside various other former players of Vardar, visited Skopje mayor Koce Trajanovski to discuss improvements that could be made to the club. In 2017, he starred in an interview on Naša TV where he described his footballing career and his own personal life.

He died on 13 January 2019 and was interred at the Butel City Cemetery two days later.
