= 1976–77 Yugoslav Cup =

1976–77 Yugoslav Football Cup
29th Marshal Tito Cup

Tournament details
- Country: Yugoslavia
- Dates: 13 October 1976 – 24 May 1977
- Teams: 32 (final rounds)

Final positions
- Champions: Hajduk Split (6th title)
- Runners-up: Budućnost Titograd

Tournament statistics
- Matches played: 31
- Goals scored: 101 (3.26 per match)

The 1976–77 Yugoslav Cup was the 29th season of the top football knockout competition in SFR Yugoslavia, the Yugoslav Cup (Croatian: Kup Jugoslavije, Macedonian: Куп на Југославија, Serbian: Куп Југославије, Slovenian: Pokal Jugoslavije, ), also known as the "Marshal Tito Cup" (Kup Maršala Tita), since its establishment in 1946.

== Calendar ==
The Yugoslav Cup was a tournament for which clubs from all tiers of the football pyramid were eligible to enter. In addition, amateur teams put together by individual Yugoslav People's Army garrisons and various factories and industrial plants were also encouraged to enter, which meant that each cup edition could have several thousands of teams in its preliminary stages. These teams would play through a number of qualifying rounds before reaching the first round proper, in which they would be paired with top-flight teams.

The tournament proper was held from September to May, with the final played on 24 May, traditionally scheduled to coincide with the end of the football league season and Youth Day celebrated on 25 May (a national holiday in Yugoslavia which also doubled as the official commemoration of Josip Broz Tito's birthday).

Since the cup winner was always meant to be decided on or around the national holiday at the JNA Stadium in capital Belgrade, and to avoid unfair home advantage this would give to Belgrade-based clubs, the Football Association of Yugoslavia adopted the rule in the late 1960s according to which the final could be played as a one-legged tie (in cases when both finalists are from outside Belgrade) or double-legged (when at least one of them is based in the capital), with the second leg always played in Belgrade. This rule was used for all cup finals from 1969 to 1988, when a single-legged final was adopted permanently.

Round	Legs	Date	Fixtures	Clubs
First round (round of 32)	Single	13 October 1976	16	32 → 16
Second round (round of 16)	Single	1 December 1976	8	16 → 8
Quarter-finals	Single	27 February 1977	4	8 → 4
Semi-finals	Single	13 April 1977	2	4 → 2
Final	Single	24 May 1977	1	2 → 1

== First round ==
In the following tables winning teams are marked in bold; teams from outside top level are marked in italic script.

Tie no	Home team	Score	Away team
1	**Borac Banja Luka**	5–1	Dinamo Zagreb
2	**Dinamo Vinkovci**	2–1	Trepça
3	**Hajduk Split**	1–0	Čelik Zenica
4	Istra Pula	2–3	**Novi Sad**
5	OFK Titograd	0–2	**Sloboda Tuzla**
6	**Partizan**	1–0	Željezničar
7	Pobeda Prilep	1–3	**Budućnost Titograd**
8	**Radnički Pirot**	2–1	Radnički Kragujevac
9	**Rijeka**	1–0	Napredak Kruševac
10	**Rudar Kakanj**	4–1	Mercator
11	**Sarajevo**	2–1	Red Star Belgrade
12	Sloga Doboj	1–2	**Radnički Niš**
13	Spartak Subotica	2–5	**Rad**
14	**Vardar**	1–0	Velež
15	**Vojvodina**	2–0	Olimpija Ljubljana
16	**NK Zagreb**	6–1	OFK Belgrade

== Second round ==
Tie no	Home team	Score	Away team
1	Borac Banja Luka	1–1 (2–3 p)	**Hajduk Split**
2	**Budućnost Titograd**	1–0	Rudar Kakanj
3	**Dinamo Vinkovci**	3–2	Radnički Pirot
4	**Novi Sad**	1–0	Rijeka
5	Rad	1–2	**Radnički Niš**
6	**Sarajevo**	3–0	Partizan
7	**Sloboda Tuzla**	4–2	NK Zagreb
8	**Vardar**	5–3	Vojvodina

== Quarter-finals ==
Tie no	Home team	Score	Away team
1	**Budućnost Titograd**	3–2	Sarajevo
2	**Hajduk Split**	1–1 (5–4 p)	Vardar
3	**Novi Sad**	1–1 (4–1 p)	Dinamo Vinkovci
4	**Radnički Niš**	2–1	Sloboda Tuzla

== Semi-finals ==
Tie no	Home team	Score	Away team
1	**Hajduk Split**	2–0	Novi Sad
2	Radnički Niš	1–1 (4–5 p)	**Budućnost Titograd**

== Final ==
24 May 1977

Hajduk Split	2–0 (a.e.t.)	Budućnost
Luketin 100'; Žungul 114'

Red Star Stadium, Belgrade
Attendance: 60,000
Referee: Vlado Tauzes (Ljubljana)

**Hajduk Split**	**Budućnost**

GK	**1**	(Socialist Federal Republic of Yugoslavia) Ivan Katalinić
MF	**2**	(Socialist Federal Republic of Yugoslavia) Marin Kurtela	Substituted off
DF	**3**	(Socialist Federal Republic of Yugoslavia) Mario Boljat
DF	**4**	(Socialist Federal Republic of Yugoslavia) Šime Luketin
DF	**5**	(Socialist Federal Republic of Yugoslavia) Luka Peruzović
DF	**6**	(Socialist Federal Republic of Yugoslavia) Vedran Rožić
FW	**7**	(Socialist Federal Republic of Yugoslavia) Slaviša Žungul
MF	**8**	(Socialist Federal Republic of Yugoslavia) Dražen Mužinić
FW	**9**	(Socialist Federal Republic of Yugoslavia) Boriša Đorđević
FW	**10**	(Socialist Federal Republic of Yugoslavia) Davor Čop	Substituted off
MF	**11**	(Socialist Federal Republic of Yugoslavia) Ivica Šurjak
Substitutes:
DF	?	(Socialist Federal Republic of Yugoslavia) Zoran Vujović	Substituted on
DF	?	(Socialist Federal Republic of Yugoslavia) Ivica Kalinić
FW	?	(Socialist Federal Republic of Yugoslavia) Zlatko Vujović	Substituted on
Manager:
(Socialist Federal Republic of Yugoslavia) Josip Duvančić

GK	**1**	(Socialist Federal Republic of Yugoslavia) Momčilo Vujačić
	**2**	(Socialist Federal Republic of Yugoslavia) Nikola Janković
	**3**	(Socialist Federal Republic of Yugoslavia) Rajko Folić	Substituted off
	**4**	(Socialist Federal Republic of Yugoslavia) Janko Miročević
	**5**	(Socialist Federal Republic of Yugoslavia) Vojislav Vukčević
	**6**	(Socialist Federal Republic of Yugoslavia) Čedomir Milošević
	**7**	(Socialist Federal Republic of Yugoslavia) Dragomir Kovačević	Substituted off
	**8**	(Socialist Federal Republic of Yugoslavia) Radovan Bošković
	**9**	(Socialist Federal Republic of Yugoslavia) Mojaš Radonjić
	**10**	(Socialist Federal Republic of Yugoslavia) Ante Miročević
	**11**	(Socialist Federal Republic of Yugoslavia) Petar Ljumović
Substitutes:
	?	(Socialist Federal Republic of Yugoslavia) Momčilo Božović	Substituted on
	?	(Socialist Federal Republic of Yugoslavia) Dragan Vujović	Substituted on
Manager:
(Socialist Federal Republic of Yugoslavia) Marko Valok

== See also ==
- 1976–77 Yugoslav First League
- 1976–77 Yugoslav Second League
