= Dragan Marjanović =

Bosnian footballer (born 1954)

Personal information
- Date of birth: 3 April 1954 (age 72)
- Place of birth: Jajce, SFR Yugoslavia
- Position: Forward

Youth career
- 1970–1972: Elektrobosna Jajce

Senior career*
Years	Team	Apps	(Gls)
1972–1974	Elektrobosna Jajce		
1974–1984	Borac Banja Luka	209	(81)
1984–1985	Elektrobosna Jajce		
1985–1986	Kapfenberger SV		(21)
1986–1991	Borac Banja Luka		
- * Club domestic league appearances and goals

Dragan Marjanović (born 3 April 1954) is a Bosnian former footballer who played as a forward in the former Yugoslavia and Austria.

== Career ==
Born in Jajce, Marjanović started playing football for the youth side of Elektrobosna Jajce. In 1972, he joined the senior team was leading goal-scorer in the club's regional league. He was recruited by Borac Banja Luka and signed a four-year contract with the club in 1974.

Marjanović helped the club achieve an immediate return to the Yugoslav First League for the 1975–76 season. He played six seasons for the club in the top flight, followed by another three in the second division.

Marjanović would spend the 1984–85 season back with his hometown club Elektrobosna Jajce. He signed with Austrian club Kapfenberger SV the following season, scoring 21 goals in the regional league. He then returned to play for Borac Banja Luka until he retired in 1991.

After retiring from playing football, Marjanović coached Borac Banja Luka's youth club.
