= Vedran Rožić =

Croatian footballer and politician

Mayor of Trogir
- In office 2004–2009
- Succeeded by: Damir Rilje

Personal details
- Born: 2 November 1954 (age 71) Trogir, Croatia
- Party: Croatian Democratic Union HSP
Association football career
- Positions: Defender; sweeper
Youth career
- Slaven Trogir
- 1969–1972: Hajduk Split
Senior career*
Years	Team	Apps	(Gls)
1972–1984	Hajduk Split	305	(1)
1984–1989	Sydney Croatia	113	(0)
International career
1978–1983	Yugoslavia	10	(0)
Medal record
Men's Football
Representing Yugoslavia
Mediterranean Games
Gold medal – first place	1979 Split	Team
- * Club domestic league appearances and goals

Vedran Rožić (born 2 November 1954 in Trogir, PR Croatia, FPR Yugoslavia) is a retired Croatian football player and Hajduk chairman. He played 12 years at Hajduk Split and has 390 official caps. He played 10 times for Yugoslavia. He played with the team at the 1979 Mediterranean Games.

== Club career ==
=== Hajduk Split ===
He started his youth career at Slaven Trogir. Thanks to the scouting of Vojmir Kačić, he quickly came to Hajduk Split. Vedran made his debut in November 1972 against Sloboda Tuzla. He was the youngest member of the Hajduk golden generation and would be the last one of them to leave the club later.

Rožić played technically beautiful football and at the beginning he played as a left back. During the Branko Zebec years, he played in the midfield. Later he became a left center back where he was good at attacking counter play and had good marking against enemy strikers.

Later in his career he played as a sweeper. He played the Backenbauer role perfectly. He was known for his elegance in front of the keeper. He could easily jump in the 11 meter box and return the ball to the keeper. Many defenders in Yugoslavia would try to copy that style.

He was not an aggressive player, he did not talk much to the press and was very moderate. During the 70s when Hajduk players such as Šurjak, Mužinić and Žungul were superstars, he would drive every day after training to his house in Trogir and would ignore the media attention.

He won the Yugoslav league in 1974,1975 and 1979. He also won five Yugoslav cups in 1973,1974,1976,1977 and 1984.

He left the club in 1984 and thus becoming the last player of the great 70s generation which stayed at Hajduk and had 390 caps in total.

=== Croatia Sydney FC ===
His move to Australia was a political controversy because the Croats in Australia were radically right-wing nationalists and especially Croatia Sydney. The media in Yugoslavia had mixed receptions in light of the controversial transfer.

In Sydney he quickly became player-coach and in 1985 and 1986 saw success, with United winning the Northern NSL Division crown over powerhouse clubs such as Sydney Olympic, Marconi, and Sydney City. However, in the preliminary final they lost to Sydney Olympic. 1987 saw a lean season in the league, but a successful cup season which brought them another trophy: the Beach Fashions Cup, with a 2–0 aggregate victory over South Melbourne.

He left the club in 1989 but for political reasons he refused to return to Yugoslavia and stayed in Sydney. He returned to Croatia in 1991.

== International career ==
He made his debut for Yugoslavia in an April 1978 friendly match away against Iran, coming on as a 46th-minute substitute for Aleksandar Trifunović, and earned a total of 10 caps, scoring no goals. His final international was an October 1983 friendly away against Switzerland.

== Personal life ==
During his Australian period, he fathered a son called Ante, who later also became a professional footballer.

== Player honours ==
Hajduk Split

- Yugoslav First League (3): 1974, 1975, 1979
- Yugoslav Cup (5): 1973, 1974, 1976, 1977, 1984
