= Mario Brnjac =

Croatian footballer

Personal information
- Full name: Mario Brnjac
- Date of birth: 3 October 1944
- Place of birth: Sveta Nedelja, Istria, Croatia
- Date of death: 24 September 2007 (aged 62)
- Position: Defender

Senior career*
Years	Team	Apps	(Gls)
1963–1972	Rijeka	320	(1)
1972–1976	Borac Banja Luka		
- * Club domestic league appearances and goals

Mario Brnjac (October 3, 1944 – September 24, 2007) was a Croatian football player.

== Club career ==
Born in Sveta Nedelja, Istria, as a player he spent nine seasons with HNK Rijeka. He was one of the key defenders for Rijeka during much of the 1960s and the early 1970s, collecting over 300 caps. In 1972, he moved to Borac Banja Luka where he played for four more years before retiring.

Brnjac died age 62 in September 2007.
