= Ivica Matković (football manager) =

Croatian footballer and manager

Personal information
- Full name: Ivica Matković
- Date of birth: 12 October 1953 (age 73)
- Place of birth: Split, FPR Yugoslavia
- Position: Forward

Youth career
- Hajduk Split

Senior career*
Years	Team	Apps	(Gls)
1970–1972	Hajduk Split	5	
1972–1973	Rijeka		(5)
1973–1975	Hajduk Split	23	(4)
1975–1978	Solin		
1978–1980	Hajduk Split	5	

Managerial career
- 1992-1993: Zadar
- 1993-1994: Šibenik
- 1995: Fenerbahçe (assistant)
- 1995: Osijek
- 1995–1996: Zagreb
- 1997: Šibenik
- 1998: Persepolis
- 1999–2000: Hajduk Split
- 2002–2004: Primorje
- 2004–2005: Publikum Celje
- 2005–2006: Kamen Ingrad
- 2006: Cibalia
- 2009: Trogir
- USKOK Klis
- 2015: Jadran Supetar
- * Club domestic league appearances and goals

Ivica Matković (born 12 October 1953) is a Croatian retired football manager and former player.

== Managerial career ==
He was the manager of Hajduk Split, Osijek, Cibalia Vinkovci, Zadar and Zagreb in the Croatian First League, as well as of Persepolis in Iran's Premier Football League. He also worked as an assistant to Tomislav Ivić at Turkish giants Fenerbahçe. He was named manager of Slovenian side Publikum Celje in June 2004, after being sacked at fellow Slovenians Primorje Ajdovščina a month earlier.

He also was head of Hajduk's football academy.

== Personal life ==
After ending his career in management, Matković retired to Škrip, the oldest settlement on the island of Brač. He then took up coaching again, being named manager of fifth-tier, local side Jadran in March 2015.

== Honours ==
=== Manager ===
Celje

- Slovenian Cup: 2004–05
