= Mario Boljat =

Croatian and Yugoslav footballer (1951–2024)

Personal information
- Date of birth: 31 August 1951
- Place of birth: Split, PR Croatia, Yugoslavia
- Date of death: 1 January 2024 (aged 72)
- Place of death: Split, Croatia
- Positions: Defender; midfielder

Senior career*
Years	Team	Apps	(Gls)
1969–1979	Hajduk Split	207	(6)
1979–1980	Schalke 04	9	(2)
Total		216	(8)

International career
1977–1978	Yugoslavia	5	(0)
- * Club domestic league appearances and goals

Mario Boljat (31 August 1951 – 1 January 2024) was a Croatian professional footballer who played as a defender or midfielder for Hajduk Split and Schalke 04.

Boljat died in Split on 1 January 2024, at the age of 72.

== International career ==
Boljat made his debut for Yugoslavia in a November 1977 World Cup qualification match away against Romania and earned a total of five caps. His final international was a May 1978 friendly away against Italy.

== Honours ==
Hajduk Split

- Yugoslav First League: 1970–71, 1973–74, 1974–75, 1978–79
- Yugoslav Cup: 1971–72, 1972–73, 1973–74, 1975–76, 1976–77
