= Tomislav Ivić =

Croatian football player and manager (1933–2011)

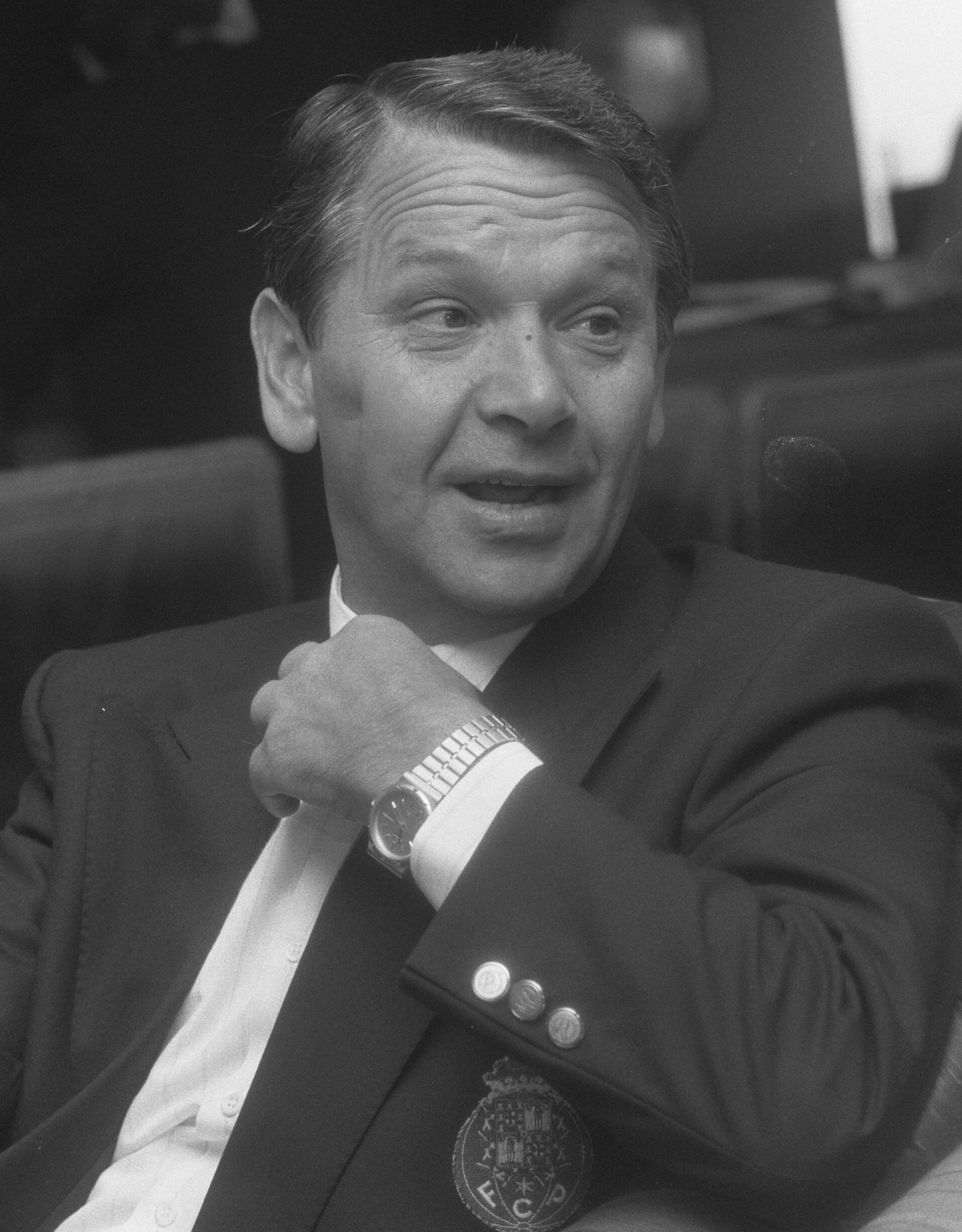
- Ivić with Porto in 1987

Personal information
- Date of birth: 30 June 1933
- Place of birth: Split, Kingdom of Yugoslavia (modern Croatia)
- Date of death: 24 June 2011 (aged 77)
- Place of death: Split, Croatia
- Position: Midfielder

Youth career
- 1950–1953: RNK Split

Senior career*
Years	Team	Apps	(Gls)
1953–1957	RNK Split	125	
1957–1963	Hajduk Split	11	

Managerial career
- 1967–1968: RNK Split
- 1968–1972: Hajduk Split (youth)
- 1972: Hajduk Split
- 1972–1973: Šibenik
- 1973–1974: Yugoslavia
- 1973–1976: Hajduk Split
- 1976–1978: Ajax
- 1978–1980: Hajduk Split
- 1980–1982: Anderlecht
- 1983–1984: Galatasaray
- 1984–1985: Dinamo Zagreb
- 1985–1986: Avellino (technical director)
- 1986: Panathinaikos
- 1987: Hajduk Split (caretaker)
- 1987–1988: Porto
- 1988–1990: Paris Saint-Germain
- 1990–1991: Atlético Madrid
- 1991: Marseille
- 1992: Benfica
- 1993–1994: Porto
- 1994: Croatia (caretaker)
- 1995: Fenerbahçe
- 1995–1996: United Arab Emirates
- 1996: Al Wasl
- 1997: Hajduk Split
- 1997–1998: Persepolis (caretaker)
- 1997–1998: Iran
- 1998–1999: Standard Liège
- 2000: Standard Liège
- 2001: Marseille
- 2003–2004: Al-Ittihad
Medal record
Men's football
Representing United Arab Emirates (as manager)
AFC Asian Cup
Runner-up	1996 UAE
- * Club domestic league appearances and goals

Tomislav Ivić (Croatian pronunciation: [tǒmislaʋ ǐːʋitɕ]; 30 June 1933 – 24 June 2011) was a Croatian professional football player and manager. Often described as a brilliant strategist, Ivić is credited with helping develop the modern style of the game. In April 2007, Italian sports daily La Gazzetta dello Sport proclaimed him as the most successful football manager in history, due to his seven league titles won in five countries. He is also one of six managers—along with Carlo Ancelotti, José Mourinho, Giovanni Trapattoni, Ernst Happel and Eric Gerets—to have won top-flight domestic league championships in at least four countries.

== Playing career ==
Tomislav Ivić played as a midfielder and joined the youth team at RNK Split in 1950, before being promoted to the senior team in 1953, where he made 125 league appearances before leaving in 1957.

He then joined Hajduk Split but only recorded eleven league appearances between 1957 and 1963.

== Managerial career ==
Ivić managed teams in 14 countries along with four national teams, and he won titles and cups in seven countries: Yugoslavia, the Netherlands, Belgium, Portugal, Spain and France. Ivić never won the league title in Greece.

Ivić won seven top flight championships (three in Yugoslavia and one each in the Netherlands, Belgium, Portugal and France); six national cups (four in Yugoslavia and one each in Spain and Portugal); an UEFA Super Cup and an Intercontinental Cup.

In Croatia, Ivić coached RNK Split, Hajduk Split, Dinamo Zagreb and (in one match replacing suspended Miroslav Blažević) the Croatia national team; in the Netherlands, Ajax; in Belgium, Anderlecht and Standard Liège; in Turkey, Galatasaray and Fenerbahçe; in Italy, Avellino; in Greece, Panathinaikos; in Portugal, Porto and Benfica; in France, Paris Saint-Germain and Marseille (the latter, his last club before retiring in 2002); in Spain, Atlético Madrid; in the United Arab Emirates, Al Wasl and the UAE national team; and in Iran, Persepolis and the Iran national selection.

=== Early years ===
Ivić's coaching career began with a year-long engagement in RNK Split from 1967 to 1968. In that season, his team finished 8th in the Yugoslav Second League West Division. From 1968 to 1972, he was the coach at the Hajduk Split Academy. At the end of the 1971-72 season, he replaced Slavko Luštica as Hajduk Split's first team manager. His first and only game was a 2-1 win over Dinamo Zagreb in the 1972 Yugoslav Cup Final. The season after, he was coaching the then second division team HNK Šibenik, finishing 5th.

=== Hajduk Split ===
In 1973, Ivić came back as coach. He knew what potential lay in the youngsters who had been in his charge at the academy, and immediately gave many of them a taste of first-team action. The talented youngster such as Vedran Rožić, Šime Luketin, and Slaviša Žungul developed to be key players under Ivic.

In the 1973-1974 season, Hajduk Split won the double for the first time in their history. The team finished 1st in the league with the same points collected with Velež Mostar but a better Goal difference. Hajduk Split defeated Red Star Belgrade in the final of the 1973 Yugoslav Cup. Hajduk Split successfully defended both titles and won the double for 2 years in a row. In the European Cup, they were eliminated in the Second Round by Saint-Étienne.

In the 1975-1976 season, the title race was very intense and emotional. On matchday 27th, there was a match between Hajduk Split, second in the league, and Partizan, the league leader at the time. Ivić's team dominated the game and managed to crush them 6-1 on their home ground. That game represents "the Hajduk Split golden generation" and Ivić's total football tactic. Hajduk Split and Partizan battled it out until the last match of the season, in which Hajduk Split unexpectedly drew with OFK Beograd but that was enough for them to qualify as champion as Partizan still could not beat Olimpija in the 90th minute. However, the referee extended the game until Partizan ultimately scored and was crowned champion. The team's performance in the European Cup was improved, Hajduk Split beat Floriana and Molenbeek on their way to face PSV Eindhoven in the quarter final. They got eliminated in extra time. Ivić left Hajduk Split at the end of the season.

=== Ajax ===
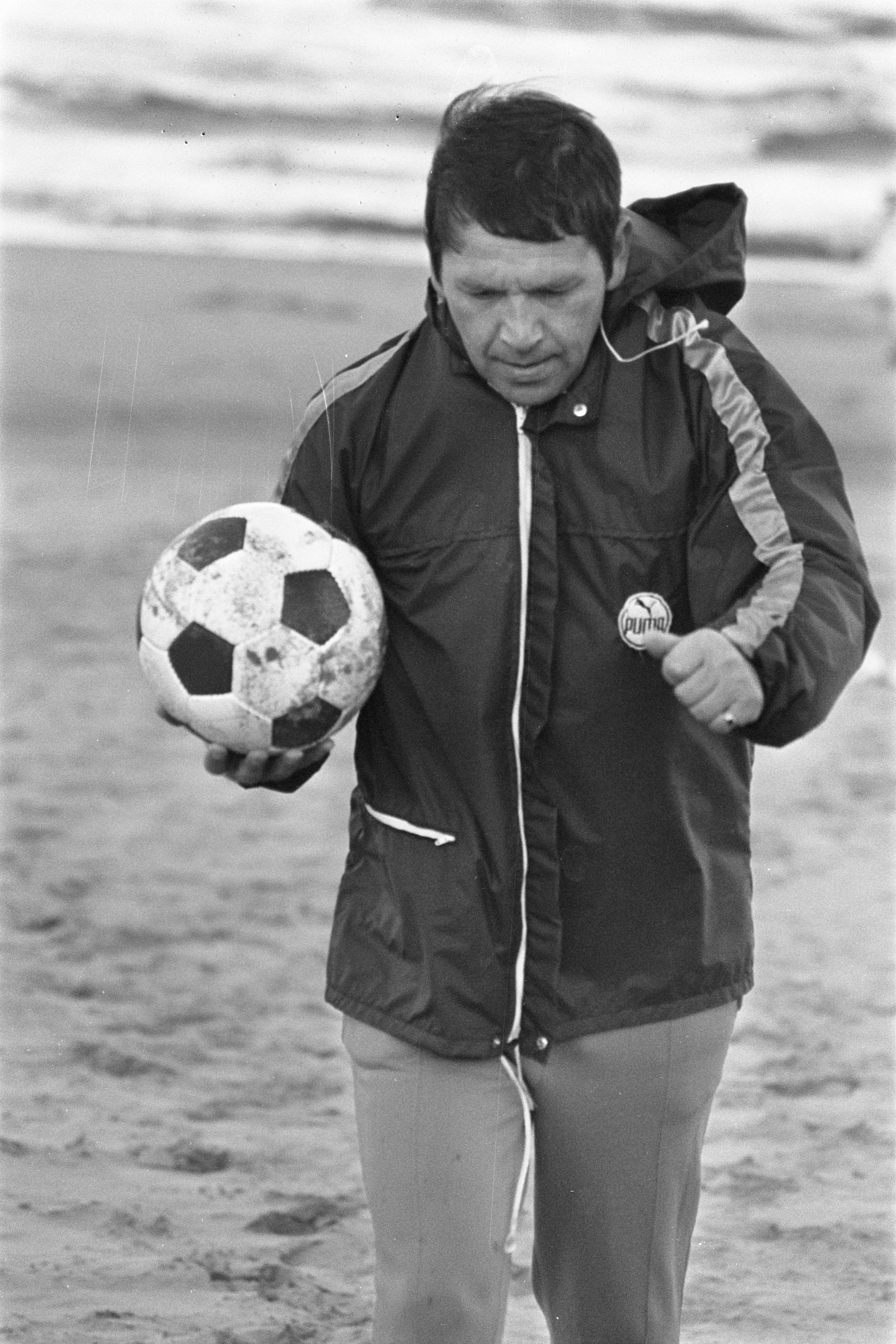
Ivić managing Ajax in November 1977

Ivić joined Ajax in 1976, he guided them to their 17th Eredivisie title win in his first season. Ajax was eliminated from the UEFA Cup in the first round after a 2-0 loss to Manchester United at Old Trafford, despite winning 1-0 at home. In the 1977-78 season, Ajax finished second in Eredivisie and lost the final of the KNVB Cup to AZ. Ajax returned to compete in the European Cup, eliminated by Juventus in the quarter final. During his 2 seasons with Ajax, Ivić had his team play counter-attack style which was against the club's culture. A group of players led by Ruud Krol initially opposed his style but later believed in his approach. He left Ajax at the end of the season to rejoin Hajduk Split.

=== Third stint at Hajduk Split ===
Ivić returned to Hajduk Split for the third time in 1978. He won another yugoslav league title in his first season back, the club first league title since he done it in the 1974-75 season. Ivić's team stayed strong in the second half of the season after Slaviša Žungul left for the United States in December 1978. In the 1979-80 season, Hajduk Split was underperforming. They were knocked out in the first round of the Yugoslav Cup, and after seven winless games from April to June, the team sat in fifth of the table and ended the season there. Ivić left Hajduk Split, marking the end of their golden generation.

=== Anderlecht ===
Ivić joined Anderlecht in the summer of 1980. He introduced a defensive style of football as he had done with Ajax, but with high pressing. Anderlecht lost multiple key players that summer, including Rob Rensenbrink, Gilbert Van Binst, François Van der Elst and Nico de Bree. Ivić brought in Morten Olsen and transformed him to become a libero. In his first season, Anderlecht became champions for the first time in seven years, with an eleven-point lead over second place Lokeren.

The following season, Anderlecht lost their first Belgian Super Cup to Standard Liège. They finished second in the league, two points behind Standard Liège. In the European Cup, Ivić's team made an impressive performance. They beat Trapattoni's Juventus in the second round and Red Star Belgrade in the quarter final, then was eliminated in the semi-final by the event champion, Aston Villa.

In the summer of 1982, chairman Constant Vanden Stock brought the Belgian national team's striker duo, Erwin Vandenbergh and Alexandre Czerniatynski to Anderlecht. However, Ivić did not agree because he thought the duo would not suit his system. Anderlecht has struggled to deliver good results, they lost 4-1 to Standard Liège on the seventh matchday and dropped to seventh in the table. After a 2–1 defeat against Waregem on the eighth matchday, Ivić was dismissed and replaced by Paul Van Himst.

=== Galatasaray ===
Ivić joined Galatasaray in 1983, He coached them for one season. Galatasaray finished third in the Turkish First Football League and were eliminated in quarter final of the Turkish Cup. He parted ways with the club at the end of the season.

=== Brief spell at Benfica ===
Ivić arrived on July 17, 1984, to succeed Sven-Göran Eriksson. However, he left on August 1 without signing a contract because the board refused to pay him in dollars. During that brief spell, he managed only one friendly match and Pál Csernai named to be his successor.

=== Dinamo Zagreb ===
Ivić returned to Yugoslavia in 1984, this time to join Dinamo Zagreb. Unfortunately, Dinamo Zagreb finished outside the top five, meaning they did not qualify for European football. After a poor result, Ivić was dismissed before the season ended. Zdenko Kobešćak took over as an interim coach and reached the 1984–85 Yugoslav Cup final.

=== Avellino ===
On July 11, 1985, Avellino presented Tomislav Ivić as the club's technical director. Despite his role, he would be on the bench in every match like a coach. He was supported by the Italian Enzo Robotti, who was officially a coach. After a poor start to the season, he was accused of having issues with the players and a lack of knowledge of Italian football. Avellino was fighting hard to avoid relegation, they earned some good results against big teams such as a 1-0 win over Inter and Roma and a draw with AC Milan and Juventus. The two defeats in February and a draw against Pisa, the other relegation battle team, resulted in Avellino being fourth-last on the table with one point over the relegation zone. Ivić was sacked on 24th February 1986 and Robotti continued his role until the end of the season. There was a report that Ivić did not expect to be sacked and Avellino's fans were furious with the board's decision.

=== Panathinaikos ===
On June 10, 1986, Panathinaikos announced that Tomislav Ivić had been appointed as the club's new manager. After one win in six matches in the league, and being knocked out in the first round of the European Cup, he was dismissed on November 2 after about five months in the job.

=== Fourth stint at Hajduk Split ===
Ivić returned for a brief spell as Hajduk Split manager in 1987, following the end of the 1986–87 season, succeeding Josip Skoblar, who had moved to HSV Hamburg. However, before the start of the 1987–88 season, Ivić left to join Porto. Marin Kovačić was appointed as his successor.

=== Porto ===
FC Porto appointed Tomislav Ivić as their new manager for the 1987–88 campaign, succeeding Artur Jorge, who had just led the club to a European Cup victory the previous season. Under Ivić, Porto began the season by winning the European Super Cup against Ajax. The team continued their international success by beating Peñarol 2-1 to claim the Intercontinental Cup for the first time in club history. In the Primeira Divisão, the Dragons finished first with a 15-point lead over second place Benfica, suffering only a single defeat. They also managed to win the 1987–88 Taça de Portugal, defeating Vitória de Guimarães in the final. Despite their domestic and global dominance, FC Porto was eliminated by Real Madrid only in round of 16 of the European cup. Ultimately, the team finished the season with a total of four trophies, first time of the club's history. FC Porto's forward at that time, Fernando Gomes, considers him as one of the best coaches of his career.

=== Paris Saint-Germain ===
After Paris Saint-Germain's disastrous 1987–88 season, the club made a managerial change by appointing Ivić as their new manager. The team performed well in the league, spending most of the season in first or second place. However, their performance dropped after entering the new calendar year of 1989; the team managed only 4 wins from their remaining 14 matches, ultimately finishing second at the end of the 1988–89 campaign. The 1989 summer transfer window featured several high-profile signings, including 1984 Euro winners Yvon Le Roux and Daniel Bravo. Additionally, Zlatko Vujović arrived from Cannes to reunite with Ivić, following their time together at Hajduk. Despite an impressive transfer window, the team enjoyed less success than the previous year, finishing fifth in the league and being knocked out of the 1989–90 UEFA Cup in the second round. As a result, Ivić left Paris Saint-Germain at the end of the season.

=== Atlético Madrid ===
On 3 September 1990, Tomislav Ivić was appointed as manager of Atlético Madrid by President Jesús Gil. He took over from Iselín Santos Ovejero, who had managed the opening game of the season. The team did not start very strong but achieved some memorable victories, such as a 2-1 win over Johan Cruyff's Barcelona on matchday 9. In October, Bernd Schuster was signed from rivals Real Madrid, and the team's performance improved significantly. Atlético Madrid went unbeaten for 18 matches between December 1990 and April 1991, keeping a massive 13 clean sheets. This allowed goalkeeper Abel Resino to set a new European record for the longest clean-sheet streak in a single season.

However, their form suddenly collapsed on matchday 31, and they lost six of their eight remaining games. In the final fixture against Espanyol, Gil directly asked the players to lose the match so Espanyol could avoid the relegation playoff, allegedly to facilitate a deal for Espanyol’s manager, Luis Aragonés, to take over Atlético Madrid the following season. The game ended in a 3-1 loss, and the club finished the season in second place, 10 points behind Barcelona. In the return leg of the Copa del Rey quarterfinals, Ivić's team lost 1-0 to Real Valladolid, which was still enough to advance to the next round. Following the match, Ivić fell out with his players after suffering a nervous breakdown in the locker room. The next day, on 17 June 1991, Gil called Ivić to his office intending to dismiss him and replace him with Luis Aragonés immediately, but Aragonés insisted on starting the role the following season. Gil subsequently stated to the press that Ivić was sick and Ovejero would replace the Croat for the Copa del Rey semifinals against Barcelona. He also added that the players don't want Ivić. Under Ovejero, the team won 1990–91 Copa del Rey.

=== Marseille ===
Bernard Tapie, the president of Olympique de Marseille, appointed Ivić as the club's new manager on the advice of technical director Raymond Goethals, who had known him since his time with Anderlecht. Upon his appointment, Ivić promised to abandon his traditionally defensive playing style, explaining: 'In Paris and Madrid, I had to shut up shop to get results. In Marseille, I have the best squad in Europe, and I won't restrict the players.' He ultimately left the club on October 29, 1991, even though OM was sitting at the top of the league after fifteen matchdays. Officially, Ivić only wanted to step back temporarily due to the breakout of the Croatian War of Independence. However, Goethals replaced him permanently. Reports later confirmed that the co-management duo had broken down, with Goethals actively undermining and sabotaging Ivić behind the scenes.

In the spring of 1993, while he was without a club, Tapie asked him to analyze AC Milan's game, the club's future opponent in the Champions League final which eventully help them to win the historic 1992–93 UEFA Champions League.

=== Benfica ===
Ivić returned to Portugal for the third time, he was once again appointed to succeed Sven-Göran Eriksson at Benfica. The team struggled to get good results and lagging behind in the title race. After less than four months in charge, Ivić was sacked on October 25.

=== European and international club competitions ===
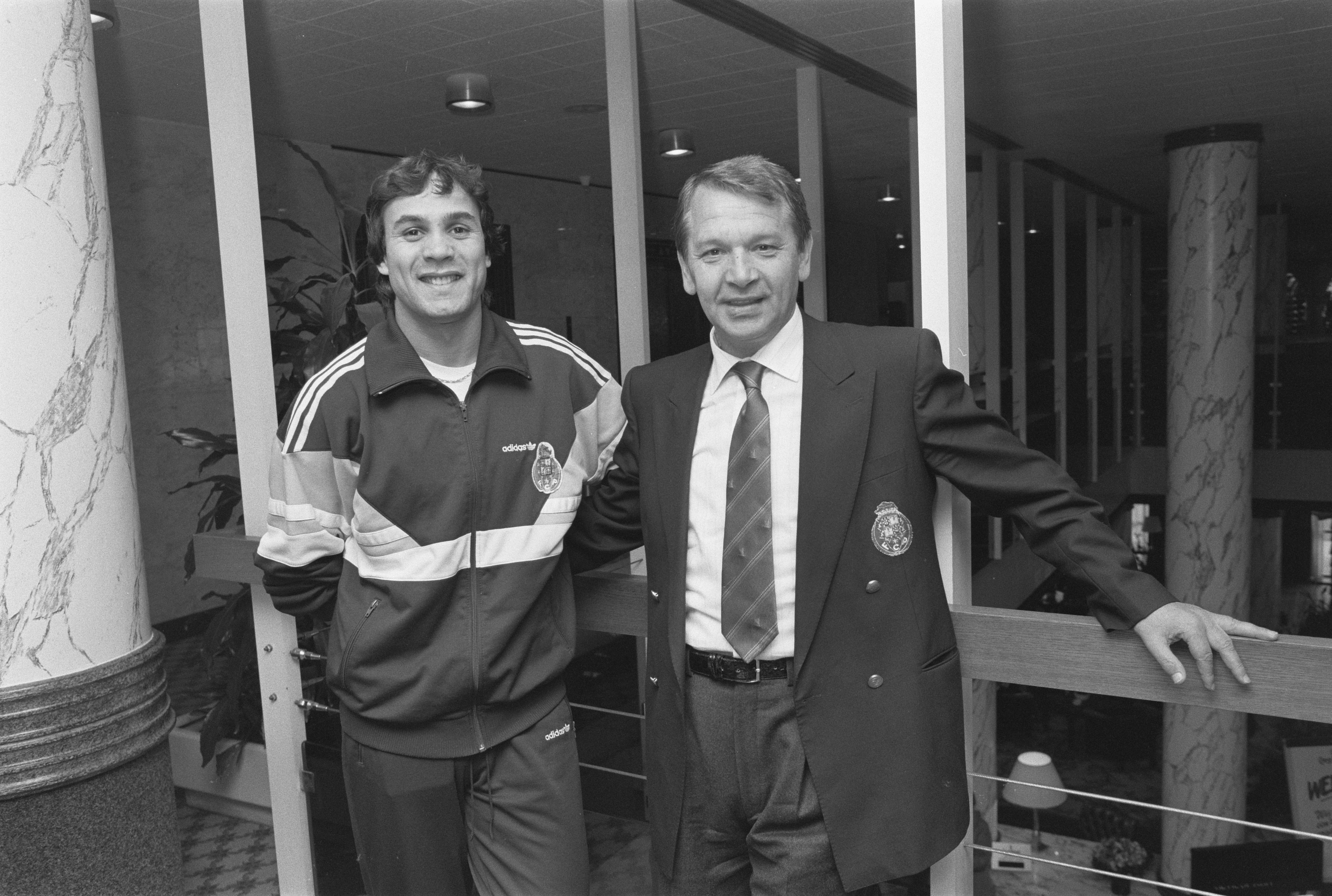
Ivić and Rabah Madjer with Porto in 1987

He took Hajduk Split to the European Cup quarter final two times: 1975–76 and in 1979–80; he also reached it with Ajax in 1977–78. His biggest achievement in the European Cup was reaching the semi-finals during the 1981–82 season with Anderlecht. With Porto, he won the 1987 European Super Cup and the 1987 Intercontinental Cup.

Ivić has one of the best Champions League win ratios, having won 29 out of 46 matches with a ratio of 63.0%.

=== International career ===
He was national team head coach of Yugoslavia, Iran, United Arab Emirates and even Croatia for one match as caretaker manager subbing in for Miroslav Blažević.

While UAE head coach, Ivić lost the 1996 AFC Asian Cup final against Saudi Arabia on penalties.

== Retirement ==
In 2001, under the advisement of his doctor Ivić retired from coaching so he could be under less stress. Three years later, he coached Al-Ittihad for a season before taking up the youth selections of Standard Liège.

== Death ==
Ivić died on 24 June 2011, six days before his 78th birthday, in his hometown of Split. He was reportedly suffering from cardiac troubles, as well as diabetes.

== Managerial statistics ==
Managerial record by team and tenure
Team	Nat	From	To	Record							
Team	Nat	From	To	G	W	D	L	GF	GA	GD	Win %
RNK Split	(Socialist Federal Republic of Yugoslavia)	1 June 1967	1 June 1968	34	14	6	14	46	57	−11	41.18
Hajduk Split	(Socialist Federal Republic of Yugoslavia)	10 June 1972	29 June 1972	1	1	0	0	2	1	+1	100.00
HNK Šibenik	(Socialist Federal Republic of Yugoslavia)	30 June 1972	1 June 1973	34	13	10	11	44	40	+4	38.24
Hajduk Split	(Socialist Federal Republic of Yugoslavia)	1 June 1973	30 July 1976	128	79	30	19	181	70	+111	61.72
Yugoslavia	(Socialist Federal Republic of Yugoslavia)	19 December 1973	3 July 1974	11	3	3	5	21	15	+6	27.27
Ajax	(Netherlands)	1 August 1976	30 May 1978	84	51	18	15	177	77	+100	60.71
Hajduk Split	(Socialist Federal Republic of Yugoslavia)	1 June 1978	30 July 1980	80	41	19	20	132	85	+47	51.25
Anderlecht	(Belgium)	1 August 1980	19 September 1982	92	60	16	16	195	81	+114	65.22
Galatasaray	(Turkey)	1 August 1983	6 June 1984	44	20	12	12	67	44	+23	45.45
Dinamo Zagreb	(Socialist Federal Republic of Yugoslavia)	5 October 1984	10 May 1985	32	16	7	9	52	33	+19	50.00
Avellino	(Italy)	11 July 1985	24 February 1986	27	6	11	10	26	35	−9	22.22
Panathinaikos	(Greece)	20 June 1986	2 November 1986	9	3	4	2	8	9	−1	33.33
FC Porto	(Portugal)	1 June 1987	30 June 1988	54	40	11	3	115	24	+91	74.07
PSG	(France)	1 July 1988	30 May 1990	86	41	21	24	111	88	+23	47.67
Atlético Madrid	(Spain)	10 August 1990	1 July 1991	47	22	14	11	62	35	+27	46.81
Marseille	(France)	1 August 1991	24 October 1991	16	11	4	1	37	12	+25	68.75
SL Benfica	(Portugal)	1 July 1992	25 October 1992	12	7	3	2	23	8	+15	58.33
FC Porto	(Portugal)	1 August 1993	30 January 1994	27	15	8	4	41	19	+22	55.56
Croatia (caretaker)	(Croatia)	16 November 1994	16 November 1994	1	1	0	0	2	1	+1	100.00
Fenerbahçe	(Turkey)	17 December 1994	30 June 1995	17	11	3	3	38	16	+22	64.71
UAE	(United Arab Emirates)	1 August 1995	23 December 1996	26	11	10	5	32	26	+6	42.31
Al Wasl	(United Arab Emirates)	1 August 1996	30 December 1996	18	6	4	8	25	23	+2	33.33
Hajduk Split	(Croatia)	13 October 1997	3 November 1997	4	2	1	1	6	4	+2	50.00
Iran	(Iran)	4 December 1997	23 April 1998	5	1	2	2	3	5	−2	20.00
Persepolis (caretaker)	(Iran)	23 December 1997	5 January 1998	2	1	1	0	2	0	+2	50.00
Standard Liège	(Belgium)	1 August 1998	18 September 1999	46	23	4	19	74	65	+9	50.00
Standard Liège	(Belgium)	10 May 2000	22 December 2000	27	12	9	6	57	35	+22	44.44
Marseille	(France)	9 April 2001	31 July 2001	4	2	1	1	5	4	+1	50.00
Marseille	(France)	31 August 2001	30 November 2001	16	4	7	5	13	13	+0	25.00
Al-Ittihad	(Saudi Arabia)	1 August 2003	30 June 2004	34	26	6	2	81	22	+59	76.47
Career total				1,023	548	245	230	1,668	946	+722	53.57

== Honours ==
=== Manager ===
Hajduk Split (Youth)

- Yugoslav Youth Cup: 1970, 1971, 1972

Hajduk Split

- Yugoslav First League: 1973–74, 1974–75, 1978–79
- Yugoslav Cup: 1971–72, 1973, 1974, 1975–76

Ajax

- Eredivisie: 1976–77

Anderlecht

- Belgian First Division: 1980–81

Porto

- Primeira Liga: 1987–88
- Taça de Portugal: 1988
- Supertaça Cândido de Oliveira: 1993
- European Super Cup: 1987
- Intercontinental Cup: 1987

Al-Ittihad

- Saudi Crown Prince Cup: 2004

United Arab Emirates

- AFC Asian Cup runner-up: 1996

=== Individual ===
- Hajduk Split golden badge: 1975
- Golden badge and charter by the city of Paris awarded by Jacques Chirac: 1990
- Croatian Olympic Committee trophy: 2003
- Most successful manager in history by La Gazzetta dello Sport: 2007
- Split sports house hall of fame: 2009
- Heart of Hajduk Award: 2011 (postmortem)
- World Soccer 36th Greatest Manager of All Time: 2013
- France Football 42nd Greatest Manager of All Time: 2019

== Orders ==
- Order of Danica Hrvatska with face of Franjo Bučar – 1995

== See also ==
- List of football managers with the most matches

Awards and achievements
Preceded by (Romania) Anghel Iordănescu	UEFA Super Cup winning manager 1987	Succeeded by (Netherlands) Aad de Mos
Preceded by (Argentina) Héctor Veira	Intercontinental Cup winning manager 1987	Succeeded by (Uruguay) Roberto Fleitas
