= Željko Mijač =

Croatian footballer and manager (1954–2022)

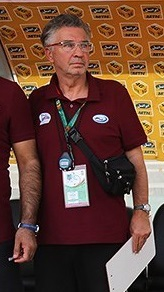

Personal information
- Full name: Željko Mijač
- Date of birth: 13 January 1954
- Place of birth: Split, PR Croatia, FPR Yugoslavia
- Date of death: 14 February 2022 (aged 68)
- Place of death: Split, Croatia
- Position: Midfielder

Senior career*
Years	Team	Apps	(Gls)
1972–1973	Rijeka	30	(7)
1973–1976	Hajduk Split	43	(10)
1976–1981	Rijeka	72	(7)
1981–1982	Toulon		
1982–1983	Avignon		
1983–1986	Istres		
1986–1987	Castel di Sangro		

Managerial career
- 1994-1995: Uskok
- 1995–1999: Standard de Liège (Assistant)
- 1999: Standard de Liège
- 2005–2007: Bahrain (Assistant)
- 2010: Hajduk Split (Assistant)
- 2010–2011: Persepolis (Assistant)
- 2011–2013: Rah Ahan (Assistant)
- 2015: Zadar (Assistant)
- 2015–2016: Saba Qom (Assistant)
- 2016–2017: Naft Tehran (Assistant)
- 2017–2019: Saipa (Assistant)
- 2020-2021: Urania
- * Club domestic league appearances and goals

Željko Mijač (13 January 1954 – 14 February 2022) was a Croatian football manager and player.

== Playing career ==
During his playing career he has played with HNK Hajduk Split (1974–76; 43/10) and NK Rijeka (1976–81; 72/7) in the Yugoslav First League. He made his debut for Hajduk in August 1973 in a Yugoslav Cup match and played 146 games for them in total, 83 of them in official matches. For Rijeka, Mijač played 117 official games (102 of them in the league), scoring 15 goals.

Later, he continued his career in France. He ended his career playing in Italy in 1987.

== Managerial career ==
Mijač was the coach of Standard de Liège during 1999. He then worked as assistant coach of Bahrain national team, Hajduk Split, Persepolis and Rah Ahan. During his tenure at Rah Ahan, he managed a single match during 2011–12 Iran Pro League when the team's coach, Ali Daei was one of the guests of 2011 FIFA Ballon d'Or at Zürich and couldn't coach the team in the next day's match. The match ended as a 1–0 loss to Malavan. In January 2020, he was appointed manager of Croatian third tier-club Urania Baška Voda, only to be sacked and replaced by former Australia goalkeeper Zeljko Kalac in October 2021.

== Personal life ==
=== Death ===
He died in Split, Croatia after a short illness on 14 February 2022, at the age of 68.

== Honours ==
Hajduk Split

- Yugoslav First League: 1973–74, 1974–75
- Yugoslav Cup: 1976

Rijeka

- Yugoslav Cup: 1978, 1979
- Balkans Cup: 1979
