= Vančo Balevski =

Macedonian footballer (born 1947)

Vančo Balevski Ванчо Балевски
Personal information
- Full name: Vančo Balevski
- Date of birth: 3 July 1947 (age 79)
- Place of birth: Skopje, Macedonia, Yugoslavia
- Position: Midfielder

Youth career
- Vardar

Senior career*
Years	Team	Apps	(Gls)
1965–1968	Rabotnicki		
1968–1975	Vardar	379	(128)
1975–1976	Hajduk Split	16	(3)
1976–1978	Karlsruher SC	36	(3)
1978	Toronto Metros-Croatia	14	(7)
1978–1979	Olympia Ljubljana		

Managerial career
- 2014–2016: North Macedonia women's
- * Club domestic league appearances and goals

Vančo Balevski (Macedonian: Ванчо Балевски; born 3 July 1947) is a retired Macedonian football player and manager. He played as midfielder for Vardar in his native country. He also played abroad for Karlsruher SC in the Bundesliga as well as playing for Toronto Metros-Croatia in the North American Soccer League.

== Career as a player ==
Vančo was born in Skopje on 3 July 1947 as the son of Todor Balevski who had played for Vardar throughout the late 1940s and the 1950s. Inspired by his father and under the tutorage of his teammate Uroš Petrovski and would climb through the ranks and earned the praises of players such as Miljan Miljanic and Ante Biće Mladinić to where he began to play within the Macedonia youth team. He would achieve further success in reaching the Yugoslavia youth team alongside Mihajlo Čaršafski and Lazar Mojsov. Despite this initially good trajectory to make his senior debut for Vardar at a young age, then-club manager Hugo Ruševljanin didn't think Balevski was of high enough caliber to play for the club. Disappointed, he instead made his debut for local rivals Rabotnicki in where he played alongside players such as Tomce Filipovski, Josif Srebrov, Midi Karatoshev and Pande Nakov. He played for around two seasons until the arrival of new manager Dušan Varagić had told Balevski on his offer to return to Vardar.

Following a short stint in mandatory military service, he made his debut during the 1968–69 Yugoslave First League where he only made six appearances due to his late arrival. The following 1969–70 season saw him be more present within the season as he made 27 appearances. Despite this though, the club was relegated from the top flight of Yugoslav football. Fortunately for Balevski and his teammates, the managerial tenure of Kiril Simonovski saw the club immediately promoted from the Second Division with Balveski being the second top scorer for the club with nine goals following Krsto Vrbica's 16. The following 1971–72 season saw one of Balevski's best seasons as he was the top scorer with 8 goals in 34 appearances. By the time his final season came and went in the 1974–75 season, Balevski had made 379 appearances and scored 128 goals, firmly establishing himself within the Top 10 of top goalscorers for the club.

Following his successful career with Vardar, Balevski signed to play in Croatia for Hajduk Split in the later half of the 1974–75 season where he only made 16 appearances and scored three goals. Following the club winning their title and staying for the subsequent 1975–76 Yugoslav First League, he played abroad in Germany for Karlsruher SC for the 1976–77 season. He stayed in the earlier half of the 1977–78 season until he caught the attention of Toronto Metros-Croatia manager and fellow Yugoslavian Domagoj Kapetanović and made 14 appearances and scored 7 goals. He spent his final season with Olympia Ljubljana before retiring in the 1978–79 season.

== Career as a manager ==
Balevski succeeded Dobre Dimvoski as manager of the North Macedonia women's national football team from 2014 to 2016.
