= Abid Kovačević =

Bosnian-Herzegovinian footballer

Personal information
- Date of birth: 1 July 1952 (age 74)
- Place of birth: Mrkonjić Grad, SFR Yugoslavia
- Position: Striker

Senior career*
Years	Team	Apps	(Gls)
1970–1980	Borac Banja Luka	285	(76)
1980–1981	Dinamo Zagreb	27	(13)
1981	Inter Milan	2	(0)
1981–1984	Ethnikos Piraeus	66	(10)
1984–1986	Borac Banja Luka	42	(6)

International career
1977	Yugoslavia	2	(0)
- * Club domestic league appearances and goals

Abid Kovačević (born 1 July 1952) is a Bosnian-Herzegovinian retired footballer. He was capped twice by Yugoslavia.

== Club career ==
Kovačević played for Ethnikos Piraeus in the Super League Greece from 1981 to 1984. In January 1981, he played two games for Inter Milan on loan from Dinamo Zagreb during the Torneo di Capodanno, where Italian clubs were allowed to have one foreign player on a short-term loan.

== International career ==
He made his debut for Yugoslavia in a January 1977 friendly match away against Colombia and has earned a total of 2 caps, scoring no goals. His second and final international was a friendly 9 days later against Mexico.
