= Branko Oblak =

Slovenian footballer (born 1947)

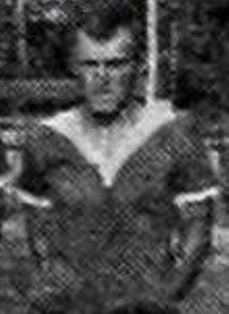
- Oblak in 1967

Personal information
- Date of birth: 27 May 1947 (age 79)
- Place of birth: Ljubljana, PR Slovenia, FPR Yugoslavia
- Position: Midfielder

Youth career
- –1965: Svoboda

Senior career*
Years	Team	Apps	(Gls)
1965–1973	Olimpija	181	(34)
1973–1975	Hajduk Split	35	(9)
1975–1977	Schalke 04	49	(5)
1977–1980	Bayern Munich	71	(5)
1980–1982	Šibenik		
1983–1985	Spittal/Drau		
Total		336	(53)

International career
1970–1977	Yugoslavia	46	(6)

Managerial career
- 1992–1994: Naklo
- 1994: Črnuče
- 1994–1995: Olimpija
- 1998–2000: Rudar Velenje
- 2000–2002: Koper
- 2002–2003: Olimpija
- 2004: Slovenia U21
- 2004–2006: Slovenia
- 2007: Rudar Velenje
- 2009–2010: Olimpija Ljubljana
- * Club domestic league appearances and goals

Branko Oblak (born 27 May 1947) is a Slovenian football coach and former international player. He usually played as an attacking midfielder or deep-lying playmaker.

== Playing career ==
Brane, as he is often known, started playing football at the youth team of Svoboda. In 1965 he went to Ljubljana's more famous club, Olimpija. He made his debut on 20 May 1966 against Partizan in Belgrade, where he scored both Olimpija's goals for a 1–2 win. He stayed with Olimpija until 1973. During that time he played 181 matches and scored 33 goals.

In 1973, he moved to Hajduk Split and stayed there for two seasons. In both seasons Hajduk won the national champion and cup winner titles. In 1975, he signed a two-year contract with Schalke 04 of the German Bundesliga for what was a world record fee for that season. In the 1976–77 season, Oblak's second year at the club, Schalke 04 finished the league in second place, behind Borussia Mönchengladbach. In the summer of 1977, Oblak went to Bayern Munich. He stayed there for three seasons and in his final season with the club (1979–80), Bayern became the German champion. After that, Oblak played in various Austrian amateur clubs until 1987, when he retired as a football player.

During the 1945–1990 period, Oblak was among only a handful of Slovenian players, along with Srečko Katanec and Danilo Popivoda, who managed to get into the Yugoslavia national team.

Oblak's debut for the Yugoslavia national team came in a friendly match against Romania in 1971. The same year he had the honour of playing at Pelé's farewell match at the Maracanã in Rio de Janeiro. At the 1974 World Cup in Germany, he and his teammate Danilo Popivoda became the first Slovenians to play in a World Cup. Even more impressive is that Oblak was selected into the best squad of the World Cup. In 1976, he played at the European Championship, which was hosted by Yugoslavia. His excellent pass for the first goal in the semi-final match against Germany is still remembered among football experts. After the tournament, he retired from international football. In altogether 46 matches he scored six goals.

== Coaching career ==
After retirement as a football player, Oblak started coaching at various Slovenian clubs, including three times at Olimpija Ljubljana, NK Naklo and FC Koper. He proved to be a good youth coach, so in February 2004 he was named the new Slovenia under-21 national coach. On 24 May 2004, he replaced Bojan Prašnikar as the head coach of the Slovenia national football team. The team started brightly under his guidance, with the highlight being a 1–0 over Italy (eventual World Champions) in a World Cup qualifying match. However, the team soon ran into a series of bad results, and the pressure mounted on Oblak, until finally in late 2006, he was fired from the job. He was succeeded by Matjaž Kek. In 2009, he again took the managers job at his home club NK Olimpija Ljubljana. He was relieved of his duties after only four games.

In November 2003, UEFA member football associations organized surveys to find the best national players in 50-year period of existence of UEFA. In Slovenia Branko Oblak was awarded this title, "beating" rivals such as Srečko Katanec and Zlatko Zahovič, both of whom represented Slovenia as an independent nation.

== Career statistics ==
=== International ===
Scores and results list Yugoslavia's goal tally first, score column indicates score after each Oblak goal.

List of international goals scored by Branko Oblak
No.	Date	Venue	Opponent	Score	Result	Competition
1	1 September 1971	Népstadion, Budapest, Hungary	Hungary	1–0	1–2	Friendly
2	22 September 1971	Stadion Koševo, Sarajevo, SFR Yugoslavia	Mexico	3–0	4–0	Friendly
3	5 June 1974	Red Star Stadium, Belgrade, SFR Yugoslavia	England	2–1	2–2	Friendly
4	18 June 1974	Parkstadion, Gelsenkirchen, West Germany	Zaire	7–0	9–0	1974 FIFA World Cup
5	15 October 1975	Stadion Maksimir, Zagreb, SFR Yugoslavia	Sweden	1–0	3–0	UEFA Euro 1976 qualifying
6	19 November 1975	Stadion JNA, Belgrade, SFR Yugoslavia	Northern Ireland	1–0	1–0	UEFA Euro 1976 qualifying

== Honours ==
=== Club ===
Hajduk Split

- Yugoslav First League: 1973–74, 1974–75
- Yugoslav Cup: 1974

Bayern Munich

- Bundesliga: 1979–80

Individual

- Sport Ideal European XI: 1975, 1976
- World XI: 1976
- UEFA Slovenian Golden Player: 2004
