= Šime Luketin =

Croatian footballer (born 1953)

Personal information
- Date of birth: 7 September 1953 (age 73)
- Place of birth: Split, Yugoslavia
- Position: Defender

Senior career*
Years	Team	Apps	(Gls)
1974–1981	Hajduk Split	158	(6)
1981–1983	Sochaux	37	(1)
- * Club domestic league appearances and goals

Šime Luketin (born 7 September 1953 in Split, Yugoslavia) is a Croatian retired football player.

== Club career ==
In his career, he played for Hajduk Split and FC Sochaux-Montbéliard.

== Post-playing career ==
Luketin was chairman of the board of two different banks, which both fell into liquidation.
