= 1973–74 Yugoslav First League =

Prva savezna liga
- Season: 1973–74
- Dates: 19 August 1973 – 14 May 1974
- Champions: Hajduk Split (5th Federal League title) (7th Yugoslav title overall)
- Relegated: Borac Banja Luka; NK Zagreb
- European Cup: Hajduk Split
- Cup Winners' Cup: Red Star
- UEFA Cup: Velež; Partizan
- Top goalscorer: Danilo Popivoda (17)

1973–74 Yugoslav First League (Prva savezna liga Jugoslavije, Prvenstvo 1973/74) competition was the 46th top league season since 1923 in various incarnations of Yugoslavia. It was won by Hajduk Split by the tightest of margins over second placed Velež. The two teams were tied on points at the end of the season, so the goal difference decided the title.

Had the current three-points-for-a-win system been in use instead of the standard two-points-for-a-win that was used at the time, Velež Mostar would have been champions with 64 points, while Hajduk would have been be second with 63.

This was Hajduk's 7th league title overall (their 5th after the World War II).

== Teams ==
A total of eighteen teams contested the league, including sixteen sides from the 1972–73 season and two sides promoted from the 1972–73 Yugoslav Second League (YSL) as winners of the two second level divisions East and West. The league was contested in a double round robin format, with each club playing every other club twice, for a total of 34 rounds. Two points were awarded for wins and one point for draws.

Spartak Subotica and Sutjeska Nikšić were relegated from the 1972–73 Yugoslav First League after finishing the season in bottom two places of the league table. The two clubs promoted to top level were Proleter Zrenjanin and NK Zagreb.

| Team | Location | Federal Republic | Position in 1972–73 |
|---|---|---|---|
| Bor | Bor | SR Serbia | 15th |
| Borac Banja Luka | Banja Luka | SR Bosnia and Herzegovina | 12th |
| Čelik | Zenica | SR Bosnia and Herzegovina | 14th |
| Dinamo Zagreb | Zagreb | SR Croatia | 8th |
| Hajduk Split | Split | SR Croatia | 9th |
| OFK Belgrade | Belgrade | SR Serbia | 3rd |
| Olimpija Ljubljana | Ljubljana | SR Slovenia | 16th |
| Partizan | Belgrade | SR Serbia | 4th |
| Proleter Zrenjanin | Zrenjanin | SR Serbia | — |
| Radnički Niš | Niš | SR Serbia | 11th |
| Red Star | Belgrade | SR Serbia | 1st |
| Sarajevo | Sarajevo | SR Bosnia and Herzegovina | 7th |
| Sloboda | Tuzla | SR Bosnia and Herzegovina | 6th |
| Vardar | Skopje | SR Macedonia | 10th |
| Velež | Mostar | SR Bosnia and Herzegovina | 2nd |
| Vojvodina | Novi Sad | SR Serbia | 13th |
| NK Zagreb | Zagreb | SR Croatia | — |
| Željezničar | Sarajevo | SR Bosnia and Herzegovina | 5th |

== League table ==
| Pos | Team | Pld | W | D | L | GF | GA | GD | Pts | Qualification or relegation |
|---|---|---|---|---|---|---|---|---|---|---|
| 1 | Hajduk Split (C) | 34 | 18 | 9 | 7 | 52 | 24 | +28 | 45 | Qualification for European Cup first round |
| 2 | Velež | 34 | 19 | 7 | 8 | 54 | 34 | +20 | 45 | Qualification for UEFA Cup first round |
| 3 | Red Star Belgrade | 34 | 19 | 5 | 10 | 72 | 46 | +26 | 43 | Qualification for Cup Winners' Cup first round |
| 4 | Partizan | 34 | 12 | 13 | 9 | 41 | 33 | +8 | 37 | Qualification for UEFA Cup first round |
| 5 | OFK Belgrade | 34 | 13 | 9 | 12 | 35 | 32 | +3 | 35 | |
| 6 | Čelik | 34 | 12 | 11 | 11 | 30 | 28 | +2 | 35 | |
| 7 | Dinamo Zagreb | 34 | 12 | 9 | 13 | 34 | 33 | +1 | 33 | |
| 8 | Željezničar | 34 | 10 | 12 | 12 | 39 | 39 | 0 | 32 | |
| 9 | Sloboda Tuzla | 34 | 8 | 16 | 10 | 34 | 38 | −4 | 32 | |
| 10 | Olimpija | 34 | 11 | 10 | 13 | 36 | 42 | −6 | 32 | |
| 11 | Vardar | 34 | 12 | 7 | 15 | 38 | 40 | −2 | 31 | |
| 12 | Vojvodina | 34 | 10 | 11 | 13 | 33 | 37 | −4 | 31 | |
| 13 | Proleter Zrenjanin | 34 | 13 | 5 | 16 | 36 | 48 | −12 | 31 | |
| 14 | Sarajevo | 34 | 11 | 9 | 14 | 29 | 42 | −13 | 31 | |
| 15 | Radnički Niš | 34 | 11 | 9 | 14 | 29 | 43 | −14 | 31 | Qualification for Balkans Cup |
| 16 | Bor | 34 | 13 | 5 | 16 | 32 | 49 | −17 | 31 | |
| 17 | Borac Banja Luka (R) | 34 | 8 | 14 | 12 | 43 | 43 | 0 | 30 | Relegation to Yugoslav Second League |
| 18 | NK Zagreb (R) | 34 | 9 | 9 | 16 | 28 | 44 | −16 | 27 | Relegation to Yugoslav Second League |

Source: rsssf.org
Rules for classification: 1) points; 2) goal difference; 3) number of goals scored.
(C) Champions; (R) Relegated

== Results ==
| Home \ Away | BOR | BBL | ČEL | DIN | HAJ | OFK | OLI | PAR | PRO | RNI | RSB | SAR | SLO | VAR | VEL | VOJ | ZAG | ŽEL |
|---|---|---|---|---|---|---|---|---|---|---|---|---|---|---|---|---|---|---|
| Bor | | 3–1 | 0–0 | 1–0 | 1–0 | 1–0 | 2–0 | 1–0 | 4–2 | 1–0 | 1–0 | 3–1 | 0–0 | 1–0 | 0–1 | 2–2 | 2–1 | 0–2 |
| Borac Banja Luka | 1–0 | | 3–1 | 1–1 | 0–0 | 1–1 | 2–0 | 1–1 | 5–0 | 1–1 | 1–1 | 5–0 | 1–1 | 0–1 | 3–1 | 0–0 | 1–1 | 6–4 |
| Čelik | 2–0 | 1–0 | | 2–0 | 1–1 | 1–0 | 2–0 | 1–3 | 2–0 | 1–0 | 3–0 | 0–0 | 2–0 | 2–0 | 1–1 | 0–0 | 1–0 | 0–0 |
| Dinamo Zagreb | 4–2 | 0–1 | 2–0 | | 0–1 | 2–0 | 0–0 | 1–0 | 3–0 | 0–0 | 1–3 | 4–1 | 0–0 | 2–2 | 1–0 | 1–2 | 1–1 | 1–0 |
| Hajduk Split | 3–0 | 4–1 | 1–0 | 2–3 | | 2–0 | 1–0 | 1–2 | 2–1 | 2–0 | 4–1 | 1–0 | 4–1 | 6–0 | 2–2 | 3–0 | 2–1 | 1–1 |
| OFK Belgrade | 4–0 | 1–1 | 0–1 | 1–1 | 0–2 | | 1–0 | 1–0 | 2–0 | 2–0 | 2–1 | 1–0 | 1–0 | 1–0 | 3–0 | 1–0 | 6–1 | 2–2 |
| Olimpija | 4–2 | 2–1 | 1–1 | 1–0 | 1–1 | 1–1 | | 2–0 | 2–0 | 3–1 | 1–0 | 0–1 | 0–0 | 2–0 | 0–0 | 0–0 | 1–0 | 2–2 |
| Partizan | 2–3 | 3–0 | 2–0 | 2–2 | 1–1 | 0–0 | 0–0 | | 0–0 | 3–1 | 2–1 | 4–0 | 3–2 | 1–0 | 3–2 | 1–1 | 0–3 | 1–1 |
| Proleter Zrenjanin | 1–0 | 1–1 | 1–0 | 1–0 | 1–2 | 1–2 | 1–0 | 1–0 | | 2–0 | 3–2 | 2–0 | 2–1 | 1–0 | 1–1 | 1–0 | 0–0 | 1–0 |
| Radnički Niš | 0–0 | 3–1 | 1–0 | 1–0 | 0–1 | 1–0 | 3–0 | 1–1 | 1–0 | | 1–0 | 0–0 | 3–3 | 2–1 | 0–1 | 1–1 | 2–2 | 2–0 |
| Red Star | 5–0 | 2–1 | 2–1 | 0–0 | 3–1 | 1–1 | 5–2 | 1–0 | 4–1 | 4–0 | | 1–0 | 2–2 | 1–2 | 2–0 | 3–2 | 6–1 | 3–1 |
| Sarajevo | 1–0 | 2–0 | 2–0 | 1–0 | 1–0 | 1–1 | 4–2 | 0–0 | 3–2 | 0–1 | 3–4 | | 0–0 | 0–0 | 1–3 | 3–1 | 1–0 | 1–0 |
| Sloboda Tuzla | 0–0 | 0–0 | 2–2 | 1–0 | 0–0 | 0–0 | 2–2 | 0–0 | 1–1 | 2–0 | 1–2 | 2–1 | | 1–2 | 2–0 | 1–0 | 3–1 | 0–0 |
| Vardar | 3–1 | 2–1 | 1–1 | 0–1 | 0–0 | 2–0 | 0–2 | 1–1 | 1–0 | 5–0 | 1–3 | 3–0 | 2–0 | | 2–3 | 1–1 | 1–1 | 2–0 |
| Velež | 2–0 | 2–0 | 2–0 | 2–0 | 1–0 | 5–0 | 2–1 | 1–1 | 4–2 | 1–1 | 4–2 | 2–1 | 3–0 | 1–0 | | 1–0 | 2–0 | 0–1 |
| Vojvodina | 1–0 | 2–1 | 2–0 | 0–1 | 0–1 | 1–0 | 5–3 | 0–2 | 3–1 | 1–2 | 2–2 | 0–0 | 3–1 | 1–0 | 2–1 | | 0–0 | 0–0 |
| NK Zagreb | 2–0 | 0–0 | 0–0 | 1–2 | 1–0 | 1–0 | 0–1 | 3–1 | 0–4 | 2–0 | 0–2 | 0–0 | 0–2 | 1–2 | 0–1 | 1–0 | | 2–0 |
| Željezničar | 4–1 | 1–1 | 1–1 | 3–0 | 0–0 | 2–0 | 2–0 | 0–1 | 2–1 | 2–0 | 1–3 | 0–0 | 1–3 | 2–1 | 2–2 | 2–0 | 0–1 | |

Source: DataSoccer.it
Legend: Blue = home team win; Yellow = draw; Red = away team win.

== Top scorers ==
| Rank | Player | Club | Goals |
|---|---|---|---|
| 1 | (Socialist Federal Republic of Yugoslavia) Danilo Popivoda | Olimpija | 17 |
| 2 | (Socialist Federal Republic of Yugoslavia) Dušan Bajević | Velež | 16 |
| 3 | (Socialist Federal Republic of Yugoslavia) Husnija Fazlić | Borac Banja Luka | 15 |
| 4 | (Socialist Federal Republic of Yugoslavia) Stanislav Karasi | Red Star | 14 |
| 4 | (Socialist Federal Republic of Yugoslavia) Nenad Bjeković | Partizan | 14 |
| 4 | (Socialist Federal Republic of Yugoslavia) Mate Gavran | Čelik | 14 |
| 7 | (Socialist Federal Republic of Yugoslavia) Slaviša Žungul | Hajduk Split | 12 |
| 7 | (Socialist Federal Republic of Yugoslavia) Dušan Šujica | Vardar | 12 |
| 7 | (Socialist Federal Republic of Yugoslavia) Slobodan Radović | Bor | 12 |
| 10 | (Socialist Federal Republic of Yugoslavia) Aleksandar Panajotović | Red Star | 11 |

== Match-fixing allegations ==
FK Velež player Vahid Halilhodžić, whose team spent the spring of 1974 in a tight league title race with Hajduk Split, alleged in a 2023 interview that Hajduk fixed its last 1973-74 league match away at OFK Beograd (Hajduk won 0-2) while further insinuating that the approach took place through OFK goalkeeper Petar Borota.

== See also ==
- 1973–74 Yugoslav Second League
- 1973 Yugoslav Cup
