= List of HNK Hajduk Split players =

Hrvatski nogometni klub Hajduk Split is a Croatian football club founded in 1911, and based in the city of Split. Between the early 1920s and 1940, the club regularly participated in the Kingdom of Yugoslavia national championship. Following World War II and the formation of the Yugoslav league system in 1946, Hajduk went on to spend the entire SFR Yugoslavia period in the top level. Their run continued following the breakup of Yugoslavia, as the club joined the Croatian First League in its inaugural season in 1992, never having been relegated from its top tier. Since playing their first competitive match, more than 200 players have made at least 100 appearances (including substitute appearances) or 100 goals for the first-team squad, all of whom are listed in a table below.

Frane Matošić holds the record for greatest number of appearances (both official and unofficial) for Hajduk, as well as greatest number of goals scored, with 729 goals in 739 matches. Vedran Rožić is the official appearances record holder standing at 390, with Frane Matošić holding the record for most official goals, at 309. Josip Skoko holds both records among Hajduk's foreign players, with 287 appearances and 55 goals.

== List of players ==
Players are listed chronologically. Appearances and goals are for first-team competitive matches, and include:

- League: Split subassoociation championship (1923–36), Yugoslav First League (1945–91) and Croatian First Football League (1992–current)
- Cup: Yugoslav Cup (1945–91), Croatian Football Cup and Croatian Football Super Cup (1992–current)
- Europe: UEFA competitions (1967–current)
- Unofficial: Exhibition games and unofficial cups or tournaments

Italics denote current players.
Statistics correct as of 23 April 2025

Name	Nationality	Position	Hajduk career	Apps	Goals	Apps	Goals	Apps	Goals	Apps	Goals	Apps	Goals
Name	Nationality	Position	Hajduk career	League		Cup & Supercup		Europe		Unofficial		Total	
Luka Kaliterna	(Austria-Hungary) (Kingdom of Yugoslavia)	GK	1911–22	10	0	0	0	0	0	150	0	160	0
Božidar Šitić	(Austria-Hungary) (Kingdom of Yugoslavia)	FW	1911–23	15	7	0	0	0	0	129	118	144	125
Petar Dujmović	(Austria-Hungary) (Kingdom of Yugoslavia)	DF	1911–26	38	0	5	0	0	0	190	4	233	4
Nikola Gazdić	(Austria-Hungary) (Kingdom of Yugoslavia)	FW	1913–21	5	14	0	0	0	0	86	92	91	106
Mihovil Borovčić Kurir	(Austria-Hungary) (Kingdom of Yugoslavia)	DF	1914–28	14	4	6	0	2	0	222	21	282	38
Ernest Hochmann	(Kingdom of Yugoslavia)	FW	1920–23	18	16	0	0	0	0	102	68	120	84
Mirko Mihaljević	(Kingdom of Yugoslavia)	MF	1920–23	17	0	0	0	0	0	89	2	106	2
Mihovil Pilić	(Kingdom of Yugoslavia)	MF	1920–24	8	3	0	0	0	0	131	12	139	15
Janko Rodin	(Kingdom of Yugoslavia)	DF	1920–30	52	21	7	0	2	0	190	14	251	35
Mirko Bonačić	(Kingdom of Yugoslavia)	FW	1920–30	40	53	6	1	2	1	155	102	203	157
Vinko Radić	(Kingdom of Yugoslavia)	FW	1920–31	53	27	7	3	2	0	221	66	283	96
Otmar Gazzari	(Kingdom of Italy)	GK	1921–28	45	0	2	0	2	0	116	1	165	1
Lorenzo Gazzari	(Kingdom of Italy)	DF	1921–28	26	2	0	0	2	0	124	3	152	5
Šime Poduje	(Kingdom of Yugoslavia)	FW	1922–31	45	19	6	2	2	0	173	66	226	87
Veljko Poduje	(Kingdom of Yugoslavia)	MF	1922–32	52	7	6	0	2	0	188	18	248	25
Ante Bonačić	(Kingdom of Yugoslavia)	MF	1922–33	65	47	6	6	2	0	170	65	253	118
Leo Lemešić	(Kingdom of Yugoslavia)	FW	1924–40	206	163	20	10	1	0	264	282	491	455
Ante Bakotić	(Kingdom of Yugoslavia)	FW	1926–32	48	30	1	0	0	0	84	70	133	100
Miroslav Dešković	(Kingdom of Yugoslavia)	DF	1926–38	122	12	9	0	2	0	147	0	363	19
Bartul Čulić	(Kingdom of Yugoslavia)	GK	1926–39	128	0	10	0	0	0	230	7	285	0
Dušan Stipanović	(Kingdom of Yugoslavia)	DF	1928–34	28	6	0	0	0	0	100	1	128	7
Marko Mikačić	(Kingdom of Yugoslavia)	DF	1928–36	66	10	7	1	0	0	98	14	171	25
Ljubo Benčić	(Kingdom of Yugoslavia)	FW	1929–35	102	98	9	6	0	0	242	251	353	355
Ivo Radovniković-Težoro	(Kingdom of Yugoslavia) (Socialist Federal Republic of Yugoslavia)	MF	1929–37	91	2	15	0	0	0	106	2	185	12
Vladimir Kragić	(Kingdom of Yugoslavia)	FW	1929–40	155	107	16	11	0	0	183	148	354	266
Anđelko Marušić	(Kingdom of Yugoslavia)	MF	1929–41	192	6	18	0	0	0	184	9	394	15
Šime Milutin	(Kingdom of Yugoslavia)	DF	1929–41	116	1	10	0	0	0	91	0	217	1
Branko Bakotić	(Kingdom of Yugoslavia)	MF	1931–45	128	16	17	0	0	0	164	65	309	81
Jozo Matošić	(Kingdom of Yugoslavia) (Socialist Federal Republic of Yugoslavia)	DF–GK	1931–47	200	26	24	0	0	0	247	27	471	53
Đuro Purišić	(Kingdom of Yugoslavia)	DF	1934–38	52	1	8	0	0	0	52	0	112	1
Ivo Alujević	(Kingdom of Yugoslavia)	MF	1935–41	92	41	12	1	0	0	110	50	214	92
Frane Matošić	(Kingdom of Yugoslavia) (Socialist Federal Republic of Yugoslavia)	FW	1935–39, 1940–41, 1944–55	279	190	28	20	2	1	430	518	739	729
Ivo Radovniković	(Kingdom of Yugoslavia) (Socialist Federal Republic of Yugoslavia)	MF	1936–53	159	38	13	4	0	0	303	118	475	160
Gajo Raffanelli	(Kingdom of Yugoslavia)	DF	1938–41	68	0	10	0	0	0	50	0	118	0
Branko Viđak	(Kingdom of Yugoslavia) (Socialist Federal Republic of Yugoslavia)	MF	1938–51	89	35	9	5	0	0	137	80	235	120
Miljenko Batinić	(Kingdom of Yugoslavia)	MF	1939–50, 1953	85	15	6	1	0	0	205	37	296	53
Ljubomir Kokeza	(Kingdom of Yugoslavia) (Socialist Federal Republic of Yugoslavia)	DF	1939–41, 1944–57	250	2	25	0	2	0	348	6	625	8
Slavko Luštica	(Kingdom of Yugoslavia) (Socialist Federal Republic of Yugoslavia)	DF	1940–56	226	19	30	3	2	0	376	64	634	86
Ervin Katnić	(Kingdom of Yugoslavia) (Socialist Federal Republic of Yugoslavia)	DF	1944–53	106	0	13	0	0	0	250	28	369	28
Anton Lokošek	(Socialist Federal Republic of Yugoslavia)	MF	1945–48	39	8	0	0	0	0	70	23	109	31
Vojko Andrijašević	(Socialist Federal Republic of Yugoslavia)	FW	1945–53	45	27	2	0	0	0	247	127	294	154
Ivo Mrčić	(Socialist Federal Republic of Yugoslavia)	MF	1945–53	112	20	12	1	0	0	202	52	326	73
Božo Broketa	(Socialist Federal Republic of Yugoslavia)	DF	1945–57	202	26	23	5	2	0	266	39	493	70
Tonči Radovniković	(Socialist Federal Republic of Yugoslavia)	MF	1946–50	36	8	1	0	0	0	114	33	151	41
Krešimir Arapović	(Socialist Federal Republic of Yugoslavia)	MF	1947–54	67	20	8	0	0	0	141	61	216	81
Vladimir Beara	(Socialist Federal Republic of Yugoslavia)	GK	1947–55	136	0	18	0	0	0	154	0	308	0
Bernard Vukas	(Socialist Federal Republic of Yugoslavia)	MF	1947–57, 1959–62	267	94	33	12	4	1	311	193	615	300
Dragutin Drvodelić	(Socialist Federal Republic of Yugoslavia)	MF	1949–52	21	4	7	2	0	0	80	22	108	28
Ante Mladinić	(Socialist Federal Republic of Yugoslavia)	MF	1949–56	40	6	11	4	0	0	85	33	136	43
Stane Krstulović	(Socialist Federal Republic of Yugoslavia)	MF	1949–58	130	25	21	10	0	0	154	84	305	119
Vlado Schönauer	(Socialist Federal Republic of Yugoslavia)	FW	1950–54, 1957–62	192	37	27	8	2	1	250	86	471	132
Ante Vulić	(Socialist Federal Republic of Yugoslavia)	GK	1951–62	116	14	17	2	4	0	202	13	339	29
Joško Vidošević	(Socialist Federal Republic of Yugoslavia)	FW	1951–62	143	63	20	15	2	1	184	149	349	228
Lenko Grčić	(Socialist Federal Republic of Yugoslavia)	DF	1952–56	88	0	15	0	2	0	108	0	213	0
Davor Grčić	(Socialist Federal Republic of Yugoslavia)	DF	1952–61	153	2	22	0	4	0	175	0	354	2
Bogdan Kragić	(Socialist Federal Republic of Yugoslavia)	DF	1953–62	32	4	5	0	2	0	112	19	151	23
Miroslav Brkljača	(Socialist Federal Republic of Yugoslavia)	DF	1953–64	147	0	24	0	6	0	224	1	401	1
Sulejman Rebac	(Socialist Federal Republic of Yugoslavia)	MF	1954–58	72	30	9	3	2	0	85	67	168	100
Nikola Radović	(Socialist Federal Republic of Yugoslavia)	DF	1954–60	97	6	11	1	2	0	103	14	213	21
Ante Jurić	(Socialist Federal Republic of Yugoslavia)	GK	1955–65	91	0	11	0	0	0	141	1	243	1
Ivo Bego	(Socialist Federal Republic of Yugoslavia)	DF	1955–65	91	0	10	2	5	0	147	12	253	14
Ante Vičević	(Socialist Federal Republic of Yugoslavia)	FW	1956–60	42	6	4	1	0	0	115	67	161	74
Ante Žanetić	(Socialist Federal Republic of Yugoslavia)	MF	1956–61	115	11	15	7	0	0	124	23	254	41
Zlatko Papec	(Socialist Federal Republic of Yugoslavia)	FW	1956–64	176	51	23	6	2	2	165	108	366	167
Pavle Garov	(Socialist Federal Republic of Yugoslavia)	MF	1957–64	108	11	15	0	6	0	162	40	291	51
Zvonko Bego	(Socialist Federal Republic of Yugoslavia)	FW	1957–67	161	38	27	8	6	1	181	126	375	173
Stjepan Ilić	(Socialist Federal Republic of Yugoslavia)	DF	1958–65	91	5	13	0	5	0	110	5	219	10
Ferante Colnago	(Socialist Federal Republic of Yugoslavia)	DF	1958–66	41	0	4	0	3	0	112	0	160	0
Aleksandar Kozlina	(Socialist Federal Republic of Yugoslavia)	MF	1958–62, 1964–66	89	2	13	1	0	0	75	9	177	12
Andrija Anković	(Socialist Federal Republic of Yugoslavia)	FW	1958–67	153	64	22	13	3	1	148	172	326	250
Vinko Cuzzi	(Socialist Federal Republic of Yugoslavia)	DF	1958–69	190	0	32	0	4	0	208	4	434	4
Marin Kovačić	(Socialist Federal Republic of Yugoslavia)	MF	1960–68	78	5	14	9	2	0	85	23	179	37
Siniša Fulgosi	(Socialist Federal Republic of Yugoslavia)	MF	1962–65	42	3	10	2	3	1	89	18	144	24
Ante Sirković	(Socialist Federal Republic of Yugoslavia)	GK	1962–73	97	0	6	0	6	0	135	0	244	0
Ivica Hlevnjak	(Socialist Federal Republic of Yugoslavia)	MF	1962–73	310	72	36	13	27	6	292	146	665	237
Ante Žaja	(Socialist Federal Republic of Yugoslavia)	DF	1963–68	87	5	11	2	6	0	112	8	216	15
Miroslav Ferić	(Socialist Federal Republic of Yugoslavia)	MF	1963–71	131	14	17	11	6	1	161	34	315	60
Petar Nadoveza	(Socialist Federal Republic of Yugoslavia)	FW	1963–73	215	107	20	10	16	6	209	173	460	296
Radomir Vukčević	(Socialist Federal Republic of Yugoslavia)	GK	1963–73	181	0	24	0	16	0	181	0	402	0
Novak Tomić	(Socialist Federal Republic of Yugoslavia)	DF	1964–67	53	1	6	1	0	0	49	3	108	5
Mladen Matijanić	(Socialist Federal Republic of Yugoslavia)	FW	1964–69	80	14	10	5	1	0	127	73	218	92
Dragomir Slišković	(Socialist Federal Republic of Yugoslavia)	FW	1964–70	108	15	15	3	6	0	116	27	245	45
Petar Bonačić	(Socialist Federal Republic of Yugoslavia)	DF	1965–69	57	0	11	0	2	0	110	7	180	7
Miroslav Bošković	(Socialist Federal Republic of Yugoslavia)	DF	1965–73	174	10	22	5	14	0	195	16	405	31
Ante Ivković	(Socialist Federal Republic of Yugoslavia)	FW	1965–73	87	8	8	2	2	0	136	25	233	35
Džemaludin Mušović	(Socialist Federal Republic of Yugoslavia)	FW	1966–69	86	13	11	5	1	1	90	50	188	69
Aleksandar Ristić	(Socialist Federal Republic of Yugoslavia)	DF	1966–70	109	7	14	3	3	0	117	15	243	25
Dinko Žutelija	(Socialist Federal Republic of Yugoslavia)	FW	1966–68, 1971-73	42	2	5	0	1	0	66	10	114	12
Marino Lemešić	(Socialist Federal Republic of Yugoslavia)	DF	1967–71	86	1	8	0	10	1	134	6	238	8
Miroslav Vardić	(Socialist Federal Republic of Yugoslavia)	MF	1967–71	94	18	9	2	9	1	91	53	203	74
Dragan Holcer	(Socialist Federal Republic of Yugoslavia)	DF	1967–75	214	0	22	0	19	0	164	9	419	9
Vilson Džoni	(Socialist Federal Republic of Yugoslavia)	DF	1967–78	207	8	24	0	28	1	191	5	450	24
Ivan Pavlica	(Socialist Federal Republic of Yugoslavia)	FW	1968–72	104	23	14	2	12	3	102	42	232	70
Ivan Buljan	(Socialist Federal Republic of Yugoslavia)	DF	1968–76	194	14	24	3	21	2	163	39	402	58
Jurica Jerković	(Socialist Federal Republic of Yugoslavia)	MF	1968–78	250	74	29	11	32	4	218	130	529	219
Joško Gluić	(Socialist Federal Republic of Yugoslavia)	MF	1969–74	55	4	6	2	6	0	128	17	195	23
Mario Boljat	(Socialist Federal Republic of Yugoslavia)	DF	1969–79	207	6	21	1	29	0	168	15	425	22
Mićun Jovanić	(Socialist Federal Republic of Yugoslavia)	MF	1969–81	210	27	17	4	26	4	110	37	363	72
Dražen Mužinić	(Socialist Federal Republic of Yugoslavia)	MF	1971–80	208	13	29	2	36	2	163	11	508	28
Ivica Šurjak	(Socialist Federal Republic of Yugoslavia)	FW	1971–81	268	56	28	6	36	9	172	70	504	141
Slaviša Žungul	(Socialist Federal Republic of Yugoslavia)	FW	1972–78	177	82	21	13	22	14	122	73	342	182
Ivan Katalinić	(Socialist Federal Republic of Yugoslavia)	GK	1972–80	122	0	15	0	15	0	107	0	259	0
Vedran Rožić	(Socialist Federal Republic of Yugoslavia)	DF	1972–84	305	1	36	1	49	1	205	9	595	12
Luka Peruzović	(Socialist Federal Republic of Yugoslavia)	DF	1972–79, 1986–87	224	9	26	0	36	0	180	14	486	23
Rizah Mešković	(Socialist Federal Republic of Yugoslavia)	GK	1973–76	53	0	9	0	6	0	39	0	107	0
Željko Mijač	(Socialist Federal Republic of Yugoslavia)	MF	1973–76	65	12	12	7	6	4	63	17	146	60
Nenad Šalov	(Socialist Federal Republic of Yugoslavia)	MF	1973–85	201	19	21	3	23	3	155	21	400	46
Marin Kurtela	(Socialist Federal Republic of Yugoslavia)	DF	1974–77	41	0	8	0	9	0	58	1	116	1
Šime Luketin	(Socialist Federal Republic of Yugoslavia)	MF	1974–81	155	6	13	2	18	1	116	15	302	24
Boriša Đorđević	(Socialist Federal Republic of Yugoslavia)	FW	1975–81	149	26	13	2	22	4	94	44	278	76
Davor Čop	(Socialist Federal Republic of Yugoslavia)	FW	1976–80, 1982–84	113	20	11	1	13	3	48	35	185	59
Zlatko Vujović	(Socialist Federal Republic of Yugoslavia)	FW	1976–86	240	100	15	2	35	19	130	61	420	182
Zoran Vujović	(Socialist Federal Republic of Yugoslavia)	MF	1976–86	234	40	18	2	33	4	143	20	428	66
Ivan Budinčević	(Socialist Federal Republic of Yugoslavia)	GK	1977–80	44	0	1	0	5	0	52	0	102	0
Damir Maričić	(Socialist Federal Republic of Yugoslavia)	FW	1977–81	31	2	0	0	4	0	67	29	102	31
Boro Primorac	(Socialist Federal Republic of Yugoslavia)	DF	1978–83	157	22	10	3	19	3	97	25	283	53
Mišo Krstičević	(Socialist Federal Republic of Yugoslavia)	MF	1978–83	114	20	6	2	12	1	74	11	206	34
Ivan Gudelj	(Socialist Federal Republic of Yugoslavia)	MF	1978–86	180	38	16	8	26	9	140	38	362	93
Zoran Vulić	(Socialist Federal Republic of Yugoslavia) (Croatia)	DF–MF–FW	1978–87, 1993–95	214	31	29	5	34	1	140	47	417	84
Mladen Bogdanović	(Socialist Federal Republic of Yugoslavia)	FW	1977–84	87	11	9	1	10	2	82	39	188	53
Ivan Pudar	(Socialist Federal Republic of Yugoslavia)	GK	1979–90	157	0	15	0	13	0	101	4	286	4
Mladen Pralija	(Socialist Federal Republic of Yugoslavia)	GK	1979–82, 1986-87, 1988-92	71	0	14	0	7	0	56	0	148	0
Zoran Simović	(Socialist Federal Republic of Yugoslavia)	GK	1980–84	83	0	10	0	12	0	52	0	157	0
Nikica Cukrov	(Socialist Federal Republic of Yugoslavia)	MF	1980–85	91	3	6	1	10	4	62	13	169	21
Branko Miljuš	(Socialist Federal Republic of Yugoslavia)	DF	1980–88	174	2	16	0	27	0	140	0	357	2
Blaž Slišković	(Socialist Federal Republic of Yugoslavia)	MF	1981–86	101	21	9	6	23	4	65	32	198	63
Zdenko Adamović	(Socialist Federal Republic of Yugoslavia)	FW	1981–85, 1986-87	66	13	11	4	9	1	115	75	201	93
Dušan Pešić	(Socialist Federal Republic of Yugoslavia)	MF	1982–84	84	21	8	0	18	6	46	19	156	46
Goran Šušnjara	(Socialist Federal Republic of Yugoslavia)	DF	1982–85	65	1	11	1	10	0	68	13	154	15
Ivo Jerolimov	(Socialist Federal Republic of Yugoslavia)	DF	1982–87	70	12	3	0	0	0	48	5	150	26
Stjepan Deverić	(Socialist Federal Republic of Yugoslavia)	FW	1983–87	55	15	9	9	11	4	39	14	114	42
Dragutin Čelić	(Socialist Federal Republic of Yugoslavia)	MF	1983–90	223	22	33	5	28	0	133	28	417	55
Darko Dražić	(Socialist Federal Republic of Yugoslavia)	DF	1983–91	120	4	18	0	4	0	68	23	210	27
Stjepan Andrijašević	(Socialist Federal Republic of Yugoslavia) (Croatia)	MF	1983–92, 1994–95	149	29	30	6	23	2	108	25	310	62
Joško Španjić	(Socialist Federal Republic of Yugoslavia) (Croatia)	FW	1984–88, 1991-95	108	3	21	0	6	0	68	2	206	5
Aljoša Asanović	(Socialist Federal Republic of Yugoslavia) (Croatia)	MF	1984–90, 1994–96, 2001	177	42	25	8	30	5	124	53	356	108
Zoran Varvodić	(Socialist Federal Republic of Yugoslavia)	GK	1985–88	62	0	6	0	9	0	85	0	162	0
Jerko Tipurić	(Socialist Federal Republic of Yugoslavia)	DF	1985–89	113	7	12	0	11	0	92	21	228	28
Igor Štimac	(Socialist Federal Republic of Yugoslavia) (Croatia)	DF	1985–92, 1994–95, 2001–02	115	7	23	2	14	1	91	11	243	21
Ante Miše	(Socialist Federal Republic of Yugoslavia) (Croatia)	MF	1985–94, 1997–2003	226	18	45	5	26	0	102	20	399	43
Miloš Bursać	(Socialist Federal Republic of Yugoslavia)	FW	1986–88	64	17	9	1	10	4	43	19	126	41
Dragi Setinov	(Socialist Federal Republic of Yugoslavia)	DF	1986–91	83	3	16	0	9	0	36	8	144	11
Robert Jarni	(Socialist Federal Republic of Yugoslavia)	DF	1986–91	127	16	22	4	8	0	75	28	232	48
Robert Vladislavić	(Socialist Federal Republic of Yugoslavia) (Croatia)	DF	1986–95	71	2	12	3	4	0	74	11	161	16
Radovan Krstović	(Socialist Federal Republic of Yugoslavia)	FW	1987–90	51	7	6	0	0	0	51	13	108	20
Damir Jurković	(Socialist Federal Republic of Yugoslavia)	DF	1987–90	36	0	6	0	0	0	60	12	102	12
Alen Bokšić	(Socialist Federal Republic of Yugoslavia)	FW	1987–91	95	27	15	3	0	0	64	30	174	60
Joško Jeličić	(Socialist Federal Republic of Yugoslavia) (Croatia)	MF	1987–93	91	15	21	5	0	0	46	18	158	38
Grgica Kovač	(Socialist Federal Republic of Yugoslavia) (Croatia)	DF	1987–91, 1997-98	53	1	14	2	3	0	48	15	118	18
Tonći Gabrić	(Socialist Federal Republic of Yugoslavia) (Croatia)	GK	1987–88, 1994–99	104	0	16	0	24	0	43	0	187	0
Nikola Jerkan	(Socialist Federal Republic of Yugoslavia)	DF	1988–90	64	1	9	0	0	0	33	12	106	13
Goran Vučević	(Socialist Federal Republic of Yugoslavia) (Croatia)	MF	1988–92, 1994–95, 1999–2001	91	19	21	4	8	0	42	25	162	48
Slaven Bilić	(Socialist Federal Republic of Yugoslavia) (Croatia)	DF	1989–93, 2000	116	12	28	4	3	0	57	9	204	25
Mario Novaković	(Socialist Federal Republic of Yugoslavia) (Croatia)	DF	1990–94	53	3	11	1	2	1	69	8	135	14
Vatroslav Mihačić	(Socialist Federal Republic of Yugoslavia) (Croatia)	GK	1990–94	61	0	16	0	2	0	90	0	169	0
Ardian Kozniku	(Socialist Federal Republic of Yugoslavia) (Croatia)	FW	1990–94	97	44	22	7	4	0	67	18	190	96
Ivica Mornar	(Socialist Federal Republic of Yugoslavia) (Croatia)	FW	1991–95	78	26	25	5	12	1	67	25	182	57
Zoran Slavica	(Socialist Federal Republic of Yugoslavia) (Croatia)	GK	1991–95	65	0	17	0	1	0	41	0	124	0
Mirsad Hibić	(Bosnia and Herzegovina)	DF	1991–96	79	6	18	1	13	0	38	0	148	7
Milan Rapaić	(Croatia)	MF	1991–96, 2003	98	23	27	4	11	2	68	14	204	43
Tomislav Erceg	(Croatia)	FW	1991–95, 1997–98, 1999–2000, 2001–02, 2006	162	81	31	21	18	7	85	14	296	123
Stipe Balajić	(Croatia)	MF	1992–94	43	6	18	4	1	0	49	10	111	20
Saša Peršon	(Croatia)	DF	1992–95	60	0	20	0	8	0	73	2	161	2
Darko Butorović	(Croatia)	DF	1992–97, 2002–03	96	7	34	4	20	2	86	4	236	16
Dean Računica	(Croatia)	MF	1992–95, 1997–99, 2002–04	158	33	40	11	22	2	56	31	276	77
Ivan Jurić	(Croatia)	MF	1993–97	53	2	12	1	4	0	32	1	101	4
Vik Lalić	(Croatia)	DF	1993–2001, 2002–03	104	5	24	1	11	0	67	13	206	19
Nenad Pralija	(Croatia)	MF	1993–96, 1998–99, 2003–05	139	40	30	4	20	1	76	33	265	78
Darko Jozinović	(Croatia)	DF	1995–98	77	2	17	2	8	0	31	1	133	5
Kazimir Vulić	(Croatia)	MF	1995–99	90	1	16	1	12	3	22	11	139	16
Jurica Vučko	(Croatia)	FW	1995–2000, 2006–07	126	38	23	11	16	5	60	36	225	90
Josip Skoko	(Australia)	MF	1995–1999, 2008–10	159	21	34	5	21	5	73	24	287	55
Ivan Leko	(Croatia)	MF	1996–2001, 2005	143	33	26	5	18	1	29	14	216	53
Zvonimir Deranja	(Croatia)	FW	1996–2004, 2005–06	137	53	27	10	17	3	95	39	276	105
Igor Tudor	(Croatia)	DF	1996–98, 2007–08	66	4	10	1	8	1	43	5	127	11
Mate Bilić	(Croatia)	FW	1997–2001	64	19	15	5	8	3	22	10	109	37
Stipe Pletikosa	(Croatia)	GK	1997–2003, 2005–06	162	4	31	1	15	2	30	1	238	8
Darko Miladin	(Croatia)	DF	1998–2004, 2005–06	159	5	31	5	15	0	49	1	254	11
Goran Sablić	(Croatia)	DF	1998–2002, 2007–08	88	3	15	4	9	0	26	6	138	10
Darijo Srna	(Croatia)	MF	1999–2003	64	4	11	3	9	1	21	14	105	22
Hrvoje Vuković	(Croatia)	DF	1999–2004	80	3	16	0	9	0	53	3	158	6
Igor Musa	(Croatia)	MF	1999–2002, 2006–07	101	18	23	2	11	0	33	8	168	28
Mario Carević	(Croatia)	MF	1999–2004, 2006–07	121	11	23	1	16	2	31	7	191	21
Srđan Andrić	(Croatia)	MF	1999–2004, 2007–2012	199	26	39	3	28	2	89	16	355	47
Nino Bule	(Croatia)	FW	2001–04	66	17	9	1	8	1	26	10	109	29
Vlatko Đolonga	(Croatia)	DF	2001–07	110	16	23	3	15	1	32	9	180	29
Hrvoje Vejić	(Croatia)	DF	2001–05, 2009–11	151	15	30	3	24	1	60	13	265	32
Vladimir Balić	(Croatia)	GK	2002–08	68	0	18	0	4	0	32	0	122	0
Mato Neretljak	(Croatia)	DF	2002–05, 2012	89	5	14	2	11	1	26	2	140	10
Dragan Blatnjak	(Bosnia and Herzegovina)	FW	2003–06	91	17	20	5	10	2	16	14	137	38
Dario Damjanović	(Bosnia and Herzegovina)	MF	2004–08	82	1	17	2	7	1	16	1	122	5
Tomislav Bušić	(Croatia)	FW	2004–09	89	28	19	4	3	1	70	13	178	46
Drago Gabrić	(Croatia)	MF	2004–09, 2011–12	82	14	17	1	7	0	22	11	128	26
Jurica Buljat	(Croatia)	DF	2005–11	97	2	20	0	16	1	88	6	221	9
Nikola Kalinić	(Croatia)	FW	2005–09, 2022–24	98	42	15	11	9	1	26	21	148	75
Mladen Bartolović	(Bosnia and Herzegovina)	FW	2006–09	70	14	15	3	6	3	34	17	125	35
Marin Ljubičić	(Croatia)	MF	2006–08, 2010-11	60	4	14	1	9	1	53	4	136	10
Goran Rubil	(Croatia)	DF	2007–10	70	4	16	0	8	0	20	2	114	6
Mirko Oremuš	(Croatia)	MF	2007, 2008–13	96	7	17	2	16	0	51	11	180	20
Goran Jozinović	(Croatia)	DF	2007–15	117	2	19	1	12	0	65	3	213	6
Ivan Strinić	(Croatia)	DF	2008–11	51	4	13	0	13	1	39	1	116	6
Senijad Ibričić	(Bosnia and Herzegovina)	MF	2008–11	76	35	17	9	16	5	47	14	156	63
Mario Tičinović	(Croatia)	DF	2008–12, 2018	60	4	12	4	4	1	29	5	105	14
Danijel Subašić	(Croatia)	GK	2008–12, 2021–23	100	0	19	0	14	0	44	0	177	0
Mario Maloča	(Croatia)	DF	2008–15	170	4	33	3	30	1	83	0	316	8
Marin Tomasov	(Croatia)	MF	2009–12	76	15	15	3	13	2	22	16	126	36
Anas Sharbini	(Croatia)	MF	2009–12	63	15	9	0	11	0	36	10	119	25
Ante Vukušić	(Croatia)	FW	2009–12	84	36	10	5	15	6	53	24	162	71
Franko Andrijašević	(Croatia)	MF	2010–14	71	12	7	3	6	0	45	11	129	26
Dante Stipica	(Croatia)	GK	2010–18	51	0	9	0	11	0	66	0	137	0
Antonio Milić	(Croatia)	DF	2011–15	57	7	11	2	9	0	30	3	107	12
Mijo Caktaš	(Croatia)	MF	2011–16, 2018–21	185	81	22	6	28	10	58	18	294	116
Lovre Kalinić	(Croatia)	GK	2011–16, 2020–	166	0	20	0	25	0	65	0	278	0
Avdija Vršajević	(Bosnia and Herzegovina)	DF	2012–15	74	4	13	1	10	0	23	0	120	5
Goran Milović	(Croatia)	DF	2012–16	115	4	18	1	19	1	52	4	204	10
Anton Maglica	(Croatia)	FW	2012–16	85	24	14	7	16	3	29	14	144	48
Tino-Sven Sušić	(Bosnia and Herzegovina)	MF	2012–16	104	19	20	7	18	4	46	5	188	35
Marko Bencun	(Croatia)	MF	2012–17	50	9	7	2	6	1	40	9	103	21
Josip Elez	(Croatia)	DF	2012–13, 2021–	73	2	8	1	6	0	37	0	124	3
Jean Evrard Kouassi	(Ivory Coast)	MF	2013–15	59	13	11	4	8	1	29	12	107	30
Dino Mikanović	(Croatia)	DF	2013–15, 2022–24	76	3	13	0	12	0	49	2	150	5
Zoran Nižić	(Croatia)	DF	2013–18	102	8	15	1	22	2	50	1	189	12
Toma Bašić	(Croatia)	MF	2014–18	60	9	7	2	8	0	37	4	112	15
Nikola Vlašić	(Croatia)	MF	2014–17	86	11	9	0	25	2	31	10	151	23
Josip Vuković	(Croatia)	MF	2014–15, 2021–23	55	1	8	1	5	0	32	1	100	3
Josip Juranović	(Croatia)	MF	2015–20	136	3	13	0	16	0	50	5	215	8
Fran Tudor	(Croatia)	DF	2015–19	109	15	14	2	16	1	35	3	174	21
Said Ahmed Said	(Ghana)	FW	2016–19	67	21	8	4	14	4	17	8	106	37
Hamza Barry	(The Gambia)	MF	2016-20	111	7	10	3	12	0	38	4	171	14
Ardian Ismajli	(Albania)	DF	2016–20	84	2	6	0	3	0	33	2	126	4
Anthony Kalik	(Australia)	MF	2016–20, 2022–	87	5	7	1	6	0	55	4	155	10
Jairo	(Brazil)	FW	2018–21	96	23	7	3	7	0	20	3	130	29
Stanko Jurić	(Croatia)	DF	2018–21	79	5	7	2	7	1	27	4	120	12
David Čolina	(Croatia)	DF	2019–23	96	3	6	0	7	0	19	0	128	3
Emir Sahiti	(Kosovo)	FW	2019–24	99	13	11	3	11	2	45	6	166	24
Stefan Simić	(Czech Republic)	DF	2019–23	77	3	9	0	6	0	26	0	118	3
Jan Mlakar	(Slovenia)	FW	2021–23, 2025–	70	19	11	3	6	0	22	3	109	25
Stipe Biuk	(Croatia)	FW	2021–22, 2024–25	69	7	13	0	5	1	21	2	108	10
Marko Livaja	(Croatia)	FW	2021–	137	79	16	10	11	1	40	22	204	112
Filip Krovinović	(Croatia)	MF	2021–	124	14	14	4	12	1	32	3	182	22
Dario Melnjak	(Croatia)	DF	2021–	103	6	15	7	9	1	30	3	157	17
Rokas Pukštas	(United States)	MF	2022–	74	11	12	1	4	0	27	1	117	13
Ivan Lučić	(Austria)	GK	2023–	66	0	9	0	6	0	20	0	101	0

Trivia: During 2001, tennis player Goran Ivanišević was registered for Hajduk as a player.

== List of captains (1994–) ==
Name	Years
(Croatia) Zoran Vulić	1994–1995
(Croatia) Igor Štimac	1995
(Croatia) Tonči Gabrić	1996–1999
(Australia) Josip Skoko	1999
(Croatia) Slaven Bilić	2000
(Croatia) Igor Štimac	2001
(Croatia) Ante Miše	2001
(Croatia) Stipe Pletikosa	2002–2003
(Croatia) Srđan Andrić	2003–2004
(Croatia) Hrvoje Vejić	2004–2005
(Croatia) Vlatko Đolonga	2005
(Bosnia and Herzegovina) Mirko Hrgović	2007–2008
(Croatia) Srđan Andrić	2008–2012
(Croatia) Ante Vukušić	2012
(Croatia) Mario Maloča	2012–2015
(Croatia) Goran Milović	2015–2016
(Croatia) Lovre Kalinić	2016–2017
(Croatia) Zoran Nižić	2017–2018
(Croatia) Mijo Caktaš	2018-2019
(Croatia) Josip Juranović	2019-2020
(Croatia) Mijo Caktaš	2020-2021
(Croatia) Lovre Kalinić	2021–
