= 1952 NK Hajduk Split season =

Hajduk Split
1952 season
- Chairman: Marin Vidan
- Manager: Jozo Matošić
- First League: 1st
- Top goalscorer: Bernard Vukas (9)

The 1952 season was the 41st season in Hajduk Split’s history and their 6th in the Yugoslav First League. Their 3rd place finish in the 1951 season meant it was their 6th successive season playing in the Yugoslav First League.

== Competitions ==
=== Overall ===
Competition	Started round	Final result	First match	Last Match
1952 Yugoslav First League	–	1st	2 March	22 June

=== Yugoslav First League ===
==== Preliminary stage (group 2) ====
Pos	Team	Pld	W	D	L	GF	GA	GD	Pts	Qualification
1	Red Star Belgrade	10	7	0	3	20	16	+4	14	Qualification for Championship group
2	Hajduk Split	10	6	0	4	23	11	+12	12	Qualification for Championship group
3	BSK Belgrade	10	4	2	4	19	12	+7	10	Qualification for Central group
4	Vardar	10	5	0	5	13	18	−5	10	Qualification for Central group
5	NK Zagreb	10	3	2	5	7	12	−5	8	Qualification for Relegation group
6	Sarajevo	10	3	0	7	8	21	−13	6	Qualification for Relegation group

Source: rsssf.org

==== Final Round (championship group) ====
Pos	Team	Pld	W	D	L	GF	GA	GD	Pts
1	Hajduk Split (C)	6	4	1	1	12	4	+8	9
2	Red Star Belgrade	6	3	2	1	11	6	+5	8
3	Lokomotiva	6	2	0	4	12	19	−7	4
4	Dinamo Zagreb	6	0	3	3	8	14	−6	3

Source: rsssf.org
(C) Champions

==== Results summary ====
Overall								Home						Away					
Pld	W	D	L	GF	GA	GD	Pts	W	D	L	GF	GA	GD	W	D	L	GF	GA	GD
16	10	1	5	35	15	+20	31	6	1	1	21	6	+15	4	0	4	14	9	+5

==== Results by round ====
Round	1	2	3	4	5	6	7	8	9	10	11	12	13	14	15	16
Ground	H	H	A	H	A	A	A	H	A	H	H	A	H	A	H	A
Result	W	W	L	W	W	L	W	W	L	L	D	L	W	W	W	W

Source: Competitive matches
A = Away; H = Home; W = Win; D = Draw; L = Loss

== Matches ==
=== Yugoslav First League ===
Match	Date	Venue	Opponent	Score	Hajduk Scorers
1	2 Mar	H	Red Star	6 – 0	Andrijašević (2), Luštica (2), F. Matošić, Šenauer
2	9 Mar	H	Vardar	2 – 1	Juričko, Krstulović
3	16 Mar	A	Sarajevo	0 – 2	
4	23 Mar	H	NK Zagreb	2 – 1	Krstulović, Mladinić
5	30 Mar	A	BSK Beograd	1 – 0	Arapović
6	3 Apr	A	Red Star	1 – 3	Šenauer
7	20 Apr	A	Vardar	5 – 0	F. Matošić (2), Vukas (2), Šenauer
8	27 Apr	H	Sarajevo	4 – 0	Krstulović, Luštica, F. Matošić, Šenauer
9	4 May	A	NK Zagreb	0 – 1	Luštica, Andrijašević
10	11 May	H	BSK Beograd	2 – 3	Vukas (2)
11	18 May	H	Dinamo Zagreb	1 – 1	Krstulović
12	24 May	A	Red Star	0 – 1	
13	1 Jun	H	Lokomotiva	2 – 0	F. Matošić, Vukas
14	8 Jun	A	Dinamo Zagreb	3 – 0	Broketa, F. Matošić, Vukas
15	15 Jun	H	Red Star	2 – 0	Arapović, Broketa
16	22 Jun	A	Lokomotiva	4 – 2	Krstulović (3), Broketa

Sources: hajduk.hr

== Player seasonal records ==
=== Top scorers ===
Rank	Name	Goals
1	(Socialist Federal Republic of Yugoslavia) Bernard Vukas	8
2	(Socialist Federal Republic of Yugoslavia) Stane Krstulović	7
3	(Socialist Federal Republic of Yugoslavia) Frane Matošić	6
4	(Socialist Federal Republic of Yugoslavia) Vladimir Šenauer	4
5	(Socialist Federal Republic of Yugoslavia) Božo Broketa	3
6	(Socialist Federal Republic of Yugoslavia) Vojko Andrijašević	2
6	(Socialist Federal Republic of Yugoslavia) Krešimir Arapović	2
8	(Socialist Federal Republic of Yugoslavia) Zdravko Juričko	1
8	(Socialist Federal Republic of Yugoslavia) Slavko Luštica	1
8	(Socialist Federal Republic of Yugoslavia) Ante Mladinić	1
	TOTALS	35

Source: Competitive matches

== See also ==
- 1952 Yugoslav First League

== External sources ==
- 1952 Yugoslav First League at rsssf.com
- 1952 Yugoslav First League at historical-lineups.com
