= 1950 NK Hajduk Split season =

Hajduk Split
1950 season
- Chairman: Ante Jurjević Baja
- Manager: Luka Kaliterna
- First League: 1st
- Yugoslav Cup: Semi-finals
- Top goalscorer: League: Frane Matošić (7); All: Frane Matošić (10)

The 1950 season was the 39th season in Hajduk Split’s history and their 4th in the Yugoslav First League. Their 3rd place finish in the 1948–49 season meant it was their 4th successive season playing in the Yugoslav First League.

== Competitions ==
=== Overall ===
Competition	Started round	Final result	First match	Last Match
1950 Yugoslav First League	–	1st	5 March	12 November
1950 Yugoslav Cup	First round	Semi-finals	26 November	17 December

=== Yugoslav First League ===
==== Classification ====
Pos	Team	Pld	W	D	L	GF	GA	GR	Pts
1	Hajduk Split (C)	18	10	8	0	28	13	2.154	28
2	Red Star Belgrade	18	12	2	4	44	18	2.444	26
3	Partizan	18	12	2	4	46	19	2.421	26
4	Dinamo Zagreb	18	9	4	5	23	17	1.353	22
5	Sarajevo	18	7	3	8	30	27	1.111	17

Source: rsssf.org
Rules for classification: 1st points; 2nd goal average.
(C) Champions

== Matches ==
=== Yugoslav First League ===
Round	Date	Venue	Opponent	Score	Hajduk Scorers
1	5 Mar	A	Spartak Subotica	1 – 0	Luštica
2	12 Mar	A	Lokomotiva	1 – 0	Viđak
3	19 Mar	A	Sarajevo	1 – 1	Matošić
4	29 Mar	A	Partizan	0 – 0	
5	9 Apr	A	Dinamo Zagreb	3 – 1	Viđak, Wölfl (o.g.), Matošić
6	16 Apr	A	Naša Krila	1 – 0	Viđak
7	20 Apr	A	Metalac Beograd	2 – 2	Matošić (2)
8	23 Apr	A	Red Star	2 – 2	Matošić (2)
9	30 Apr	A	Budućnost	2 – 1	Luštica, Andrijašević
10	20 Aug	H	Spartak Subotica	2 – 0	Luštica, Viđak
11	27 Aug	H	Lokomotiva	1 – 1	Ožegović (o.g.)
12	17 Sep	H	Sarajevo	2 – 2	Viđak, Vukas
13	24 Sep	H	Partizan	0 – 0	
14	1 Oct	H	BSK Beograd	5 – 2	Vukas (2), Krstulović, Arapović, Radovniković
15	15 Oct	H	Dinamo Zagreb	1 – 0	Radovniković
16	22 Oct	H	Naša Krila	0 – 0	
17	29 Oct	H	Red Star	2 – 1	Broketa, Vukas
18	12 Nov	H	Budućnost	2 – 0	Matošić, Luštica

Sources: hajduk.hr

=== Yugoslav Cup ===
Round	Date	Venue	Opponent	Score	Hajduk Scorers
R1	26 Nov	A	Šibenik	2 – 0	Radovniković, Šenauer
R2	30 Nov	H	Dinamo Zaječar	3 – 0 (f)	
R3	3 Dec	H	Sobota	15 – 0	Krstulović (4), Šenauer (4), Mladinić (3), Matošić (3), Viđak
QF	10 Dec	H	Radnički Beograd	4 – 3	Krstulović (2), Broketa (2)
SF	17 Dec	A	Dinamo Zagreb	1 – 2	Radovniković

Sources: hajduk.hr

== Player seasonal records ==
=== Top scorers ===
Rank	Name	League	Cup	Total
1	(Socialist Federal Republic of Yugoslavia) Frane Matošić	7	3	10
2	(Socialist Federal Republic of Yugoslavia) Stane Krstulović	1	6	7
3	(Socialist Federal Republic of Yugoslavia) Branko Viđak	5	1	6
4	(Socialist Federal Republic of Yugoslavia) Vladimir Šenauer	–	5	5
5	(Socialist Federal Republic of Yugoslavia) Slavko Luštica	4	–	4
5	(Socialist Federal Republic of Yugoslavia) Ivo Radovniković	2	2	4
5	(Socialist Federal Republic of Yugoslavia) Bernard Vukas	4	–	4
8	(Socialist Federal Republic of Yugoslavia) Božo Broketa	1	2	3
8	(Socialist Federal Republic of Yugoslavia) Ante Mladinić	–	3	3
10	(Socialist Federal Republic of Yugoslavia) Vojko Andrijašević	1	–	1
10	(Socialist Federal Republic of Yugoslavia) Krešimir Arapović	1	–	1
	Own goals	3	–	2
	TOTALS	28	22	50

Source: Competitive matches

== See also ==
- 1950 Yugoslav First League
- List of unbeaten football club seasons

== External sources ==
- 1950 Yugoslav Cup at rsssf.com
- 1950 Yugoslav First League at historical-lineups.com
