= List of HNK Hajduk Split managers =

Hrvatski nogometni klub Hajduk Split is a professional football club based in Split, Croatia, which plays in the HNL. This chronological list comprises all those who have held the position of manager of the first team of Hajduk Split from 1911, when the first professional manager was appointed, to the present day.

The first manager of Hajduk Split was Bohemian Oldřich Just, who joined the club in 1911 as a player-manager. He was in charge from 1911 to 1912. The current manager is Gennaro Gattuso, who took over the club in June 2024.

== List of Hajduk managers ==
=== 1911–1992 ===
- (Austria-Hungary) Oldřich Just (1911–12)
- (Austria-Hungary) Josef Šwagrovský (1912)
- (Austria-Hungary) Otto Bohata (1913)
- (Austria-Hungary) Norbert Zajíček (1914)
- (Austria-Hungary) Zdeňek Jahn (1915–18)
- (Czechoslovakia) Karel Šťastný (1919)
- (Czechoslovakia) Rudolf Sloup-Štapl (1920)
- (Czechoslovakia) Fraňo Zoubek (1920)
- (Austria) Franz Mantler (1921)
- (Czechoslovakia) Jindřich Šoltis (1922)
- (Czechoslovakia) Václav Pinc (1922)
- (Czechoslovakia) Jaroslav Bohata (1923)
- (Kingdom of Yugoslavia) Luka Kaliterna (1923–30)
- (Austria) Erwin Puschner (1930)
- (Kingdom of Yugoslavia) Luka Kaliterna (1930–36)
- (Kingdom of Yugoslavia) Ante Blažević (1936)
- (Czechoslovakia) Karel Senecký (1937)
- (Kingdom of Yugoslavia) Luka Kaliterna (1937)
- (Kingdom of Hungary) Illés Spitz (1938–39)
- (Kingdom of Yugoslavia) Ljubo Benčić (1939–40)
- (Czechoslovakia) Jiří Sobotka (1940)
- (Kingdom of Yugoslavia) Ljubo Benčić (1940)
- (Czechoslovakia) Jiří Sobotka (1941)
- (Socialist Federal Republic of Yugoslavia) Ljubo Benčić (1941–48)
- (Socialist Federal Republic of Yugoslavia) Luka Kaliterna (1948–51)
- (Socialist Federal Republic of Yugoslavia) Branko Bakotić (1951)
- (Socialist Federal Republic of Yugoslavia) Jozo Matošić (1952–54)
- (Socialist Federal Republic of Yugoslavia) Aleksandar Tomašević (1954–55)
- (Socialist Federal Republic of Yugoslavia) Ljubo Benčić (1955–56)
- (Socialist Federal Republic of Yugoslavia) Frane Matošić (1956–58)
- (Socialist Federal Republic of Yugoslavia) Ivo Radovniković (1958–59)
- (Socialist Federal Republic of Yugoslavia) Milovan Ćirić (1959–61)
- (Socialist Federal Republic of Yugoslavia) Leo Lemešić (1961–62)
- (Socialist Federal Republic of Yugoslavia) Florijan Matekalo (1962)
- (Socialist Federal Republic of Yugoslavia) Lenko Grčić (1963)
- (Socialist Federal Republic of Yugoslavia) Milovan Ćirić (1963)
- (Socialist Federal Republic of Yugoslavia) Ozren Nedoklan (1964)
- (Socialist Federal Republic of Yugoslavia) Frane Matošić (1965)
- (Socialist Federal Republic of Yugoslavia) Dušan Nenković (1965–69)
- (Socialist Federal Republic of Yugoslavia) Slavko Luštica (1969–71)
- (Socialist Federal Republic of Yugoslavia) Tomislav Ivić (1972)
- (Socialist Federal Republic of Yugoslavia) Branko Zebec (1972–73)
- (Socialist Federal Republic of Yugoslavia) Tomislav Ivić (1973–76)
- (Socialist Federal Republic of Yugoslavia) Josip Duvančić (1976–77)
- (Socialist Federal Republic of Yugoslavia) Vlatko Marković (1977–78)
- (Socialist Federal Republic of Yugoslavia) Tomislav Ivić (1978–80)
- (Socialist Federal Republic of Yugoslavia) Ante Mladinić (1980–82)
- (Socialist Federal Republic of Yugoslavia) Petar Nadoveza (1982–84)
- (Socialist Federal Republic of Yugoslavia) Stanko Poklepović (1984–86)
- (Socialist Federal Republic of Yugoslavia) Sergije Krešić (1986)
- (Socialist Federal Republic of Yugoslavia) Josip Skoblar (1986–87)
- (Socialist Federal Republic of Yugoslavia) Marin Kovačić (1987)
- (Socialist Federal Republic of Yugoslavia) Tomislav Ivić (1987)
- (Bulgaria) Ivan Vutsov (1987–88)
- (Socialist Federal Republic of Yugoslavia) Petar Nadoveza (1988–89)
- (Socialist Federal Republic of Yugoslavia) Luka Peruzović (1989–90)
- (Socialist Federal Republic of Yugoslavia) Josip Skoblar (1990–91)

=== 1992– ===
- Only first-team competitive matches are counted. Wins, losses and draws are results at the final whistle; the results of penalty shoot-outs are not counted.
- Statistics are complete up to and including the match played on 31 October 2021

Key

- M = matches played; W = matches won; D = matches drawn; L = matches lost; GF = goals for; GA = goals against; Win % = percentage of total matches won
- † Managers with this background and symbol in the "Name" column are italicised to denote caretaker appointments.
- ‡ Managers with this background and symbol in the "Name" column are italicised to denote caretaker appointments promoted to full-time manager.

List of HNK Hajduk Split managers by season
Tenure	Manager																					
Tenure	Manager	Croatian Competitions						UEFA Competitions						Total								
Tenure	Manager	P	W	D	L	GF	GA	P	W	D	L	GF	GA	P	W	D	L	GF	GA	Win%		
1991–93	(Croatia) Stanko Poklepović	44	28	11	5	83	30		2	1	0	1	1	2		46	29	11	6	84	32	63.04
1993–95	(Croatia) Ivan Katalinić	81	49	22	10	189	71		14	5	5	4	12	17		95	54	27	14	201	88	56.84
1995–96	(Croatia) Mirko Jozić	20	13	3	4	44	23		0	0	0	0	0	0		20	13	3	4	44	23	65.00
1996–97	(Croatia) Ivan Buljan	54	33	10	11	109	50		4	3	0	1	7	3		58	36	10	12	116	53	62.07
1997	(Croatia) Luka Bonačić	9	8	0	1	15	2		6	4	0	2	13	8		15	12	0	3	28	10	80.00
1997	(Croatia) Tomislav Ivić	4	2	1	1	6	4		0	0	0	0	0	0		4	2	1	1	6	4	50.00
1997–98	(Croatia) Luka Bonačić	19	9	3	7	32	25		0	0	0	0	0	0		19	9	3	7	32	25	47.37
1998	(Croatia) Zoran Vulić †	5	1	2	2	7	10		0	0	0	0	0	0		5	1	2	2	7	10	20.00
1998–99	(Croatia) Ivan Katalinić	40	23	10	7	83	37		8	2	4	2	10	8		48	25	14	9	93	45	52.08
1999–00	(Croatia) Ivica Matković	23	12	8	3	43	23		0	0	0	0	0	0		23	12	8	3	43	23	52.17
2000	(Croatia) Petar Nadoveza	13	6	3	4	17	11		2	0	1	1	2	4		15	6	4	5	19	15	40.00
2000–01	(Croatia) Zoran Vulić	36	22	7	7	80	26		0	0	0	0	0	0		36	22	7	7	80	26	61.11
2001	(Croatia) Nenad Gračan	17	13	1	3	38	21		6	1	3	2	3	5		23	14	4	5	41	26	60.87
2001–02	(Croatia) Slaven Bilić	16	10	4	2	29	12		0	0	0	0	0	0		16	10	4	2	29	12	62.50
2002–04	(Croatia) Zoran Vulić	72	51	9	12	134	53		10	3	4	3	17	8		82	54	13	15	151	61	65.85
2004	(Croatia) Ivan Katalinić	6	3	1	2	9	7		2	1	0	1	3	4		8	4	1	3	12	11	50.00
2004–05	(Bosnia and Herzegovina) Blaž Slišković	23	14	3	6	41	23		0	0	0	0	0	0		23	14	3	6	41	23	60.87
2005	(Croatia) Igor Štimac †	12	4	5	3	22	13		0	0	0	0	0	0		12	4	5	3	22	13	33.33
2005	(Croatia) Miroslav Blažević	9	4	2	3	13	7		2	0	0	2	0	8		11	4	2	5	13	15	36.36
2005–06	(Croatia) Ivan Gudelj	14	5	6	3	19	13		0	0	0	0	0	0		14	5	6	3	19	13	35.71
2006	(Croatia) Luka Bonačić	16	5	4	7	18	20		0	0	0	0	0	0		16	5	4	7	18	20	31.25
2006–07	(Croatia) Zoran Vulić	31	22	4	5	59	23		0	0	0	0	0	0		31	22	4	5	59	23	70.97
2007	(Croatia) Ivan Pudar	13	6	6	1	26	13		3	1	1	1	2	2		16	7	7	2	28	15	43.75
2007	(Croatia) Sergije Krešić	9	5	1	3	32	13		1	0	1	0	1	1		10	5	2	3	33	14	50.00
2007–08	(Croatia) Robert Jarni	27	12	8	7	47	32		0	0	0	0	0	0		27	12	8	7	47	32	44.44
2008	(Croatia) Goran Vučević	13	7	2	4	20	15		4	2	1	1	7	2		17	9	3	5	27	17	52.94
2008–09	(Croatia) Ante Miše	30	18	7	5	55	19		1	0	1	0	1	1		31	18	8	5	56	20	58.06
2009	(Croatia) Ivica Kalinić	0	0	0	0	0	0		1	0	0	1	0	1		1	0	0	1	0	1	0.00^{1}
2009–10	(Italy) Edoardo Reja	17	11	3	3	33	12		0	0	0	0	0	0		17	11	3	3	33	12	64.71
2010	(Croatia) Stanko Poklepović	32	20	8	4	69	22		7	3	1	3	11	10		39	23	9	7	80	32	58.97
2010–11	(Croatia) Goran Vučević ‡	12	6	2	4	18	15		3	0	0	3	3	8		15	6	2	7	21	23	40.00
2011	(Croatia) Ante Miše †	5	2	1	2	7	7		0	0	0	0	0	0		5	2	1	2	7	7	40.00
2011–12	(Bulgaria) Krasimir Balakov	26	16	5	5	51	21		2	0	0	2	0	2		28	16	5	7	51	23	57.14
2012–13	(Croatia) Mišo Krstičević	42	19	12	11	59	37		4	2	0	2	4	4		46	21	12	13	63	41	45.65
2013–15	(Croatia) Igor Tudor	67	32	19	16	120	90		10	3	2	5	12	12		77	35	21	21	132	102	45.45
2015	(Croatia) Stanko Poklepović †	9	2	3	4	12	13		0	0	0	0	0	0		9	2	3	4	12	13	22.22
2015	(Croatia) Hari Vukas †	10	6	1	3	14	14	0	0	0	0	0	0	10	6	1	3	14	14	60.00		
2015–16	(Croatia) Damir Burić	41	20	10	11	60	36	8	4	1	3	17	9	49	24	11	14	77	45	48.98		
2016	(Slovenia) Marijan Pušnik	17	10	4	3	39	17	6	4	1	1	13	7	23	14	5	4	52	24	60.87		
2016–17	(Spain) Joan Carrillo	35	19	9	7	69	34	6	3	2	1	6	4	41	22	11	8	75	38	53.66		
2017–18	(Croatia) Željko Kopić	30	14	9	7	58	35	4	2	1	1	5	4	34	16	10	8	63	39	47.06		
2018	(Croatia) Zoran Vulić	11	5	4	2	16	12	0	0	0	0	0	0	11	5	4	2	16	12	45.45		
2018–19	(Croatia) Siniša Oreščanin	22	14	3	5	40	19	2	1	0	1	3	3	24	15	3	6	43	22	62.50		
2019	(Croatia) Damir Burić	21	11	5	5	33	20	0	0	0	0	0	0	21	11	5	5	33	20	52.38		
2020	(Croatia) Igor Tudor	18	9	1	8	32	24	0	0	0	0	0	0	18	9	1	8	32	24	50.00		
2020	(Croatia) Hari Vukas ‡	8	3	1	4	10	10	2	1	0	1	1	2	10	4	1	5	11	12	40.00		
2020–21	(Bosnia and Herzegovina) Boro Primorac	6	2	1	3	10	12	0	0	0	0	0	0	6	2	1	3	10	12	33.33		
2021	(Italy) Paolo Tramezzani	24	14	4	6	31	19	0	0	0	0	0	0	24	14	4	6	31	19	58.33		
2021	(Sweden) Jens Gustafsson	15	8	3	4	25	16	2	1	0	1	3	4	17	9	3	5	28	20	52.94		
2021–22	(Lithuania) Valdas Dambrauskas	33	22	7	4	71	31	4	1	0	3	5	8	37	23	7	7	76	39	62.16		
2022	(Bosnia and Herzegovina) Mislav Karoglan †	10	7	3	0	22	9	0	0	0	0	0	0	10	7	3	0	22	9	70.00		
2022–23	(Croatia) Ivan Leko	35	22	3	10	49	30	2	0	1	1	0	3	37	22	4	11	49	33	59.46		
2023–24	(Bosnia and Herzegovina) Mislav Karoglan	21	12	4	5	33	11	0	0	0	0	0	0	21	12	4	5	33	11	57.14		
2024–25	(Italy) Gennaro Gattuso	39	19	12	8	57	37	4	1	2	1	2	1	43	20	14	9	59	38	46.51		
2025–	(Spain) Gonzalo García	39	21	9	9	67	40	4	2	1	1	6	6	43	23	10	10	73	46	53.49		

^{1} Kalinić tenure as Hajduk manager was terminated after suffering a heart attack following European League home loss against Žilina, his debut game in charge of the club.

Source: hrnogomet.com

Interim managers
Tenure	Manager																					
Tenure	Manager	Croatian Competitions						UEFA Competitions						Total								
Tenure	Manager	P	W	D	L	GF	GA	P	W	D	L	GF	GA	P	W	D	L	GF	GA	Win%		
1995	(Croatia) Ivan Buljan	1	0	1	0	0	0		0	0	0	0	0	0		1	0	1	0	0	0	0.00
2004	(Croatia) Petar Nadoveza	3	3	0	0	5	0		0	0	0	0	0	0		3	3	0	0	5	0	100.00
2009	(Croatia) Joško Španjić	2	0	1	1	3	4		0	0	0	0	0	0		2	0	1	1	3	4	0.00
2010	(Croatia) Joško Španjić	1	1	0	0	2	1		0	0	0	0	0	0		1	1	0	0	2	1	100.00
2015	(Croatia) Hari Vukas	2	1	0	1	2	4		0	0	0	0	0	0		2	1	0	1	2	4	50.00
2015	(Croatia) Goran Vučević	2	0	0	2	1	3		0	0	0	0	0	0		2	0	0	2	1	3	0.00
2016	(Croatia) Marko Lozo	1	0	0	1	1	2		0	0	0	0	0	0		1	0	0	1	1	2	0.00
2024	(Bosnia and Herzegovina) Jure Ivanković	0	0	0	0	0	0		0	0	0	0	0	0		0	0	0	0	0	0	—

Source: hrnogomet.com

== Honours ==
The following table lists managers according to trophies won. The most successful manager to date was Tomislav Ivić who had four spells with the club (1973–76, 1978–80, 1987, 1997) and led Hajduk to a total of 7 trophies, three Yugoslav First League championships (1974, 1975, and 1979) and four Yugoslav Cup titles (1972, 1973, 1974, and 1976).

Since the inception of Croatian association football league competition, the Prva HNL in 1992, most successful was Ivan Katalinić, who also claimed 7 trophies. During his three spells at Hajduk (1993–95, 1998–99, 2004), Katalinić won two Croatian First League championships (1994, 1995), two Croatian Cup titles (1993, 1995) and three Croatian Supercup titles (1993, 1994 and 2004).

Petar Nadoveza is the only manager to have won honours available to Hajduk in both the Yugoslav and Croatian football league systems, winning the Yugoslav Cup in 1984 and Croatian Cup in 2000. In 2004, he also won the Croatian First League, after taking over from Zoran Vulić three rounds before the end of the champhionship.

=== Key ===
- CL = Croatian First League
- CC = Croatian Cup
- CS = Croatian Supercup
- YL = Yugoslav First League (defunct since 1991)
- YC = Yugoslav Cup (defunct since 1991)

=== Winning managers ===
Manager	Tenure	Trophies						Total	Notes
Manager	Tenure	Domestic					Int.	Total	Notes
Manager	Tenure	YL	YC	CL	CC	CS	Int.	Total	Notes
(Kingdom of Yugoslavia) Ljubo Benčić	1939–40, 1940, 1941–48, 1955–56	–	–	3^{2}	N/A		–	3	
(Socialist Federal Republic of Yugoslavia) Luka Kaliterna	1923–30, 1930–36, 1937, 1948–51	3	–	N/A			–	3	
(Socialist Federal Republic of Yugoslavia) Jozo Matošić	1952–54	1	–	N/A			–	1	
(Socialist Federal Republic of Yugoslavia) Aleksandar Tomašević	1954–55	1	–	N/A			–	1	
(Socialist Federal Republic of Yugoslavia) Dušan Nenković	1965–69	–	1	N/A			–	1	
(Socialist Federal Republic of Yugoslavia) Slavko Luštica	1969–71	1	–	N/A			–	1	
(Socialist Federal Republic of Yugoslavia) Josip Duvančić	1976–77	–	1	N/A			–	1	
(Socialist Federal Republic of Yugoslavia) Josip Skoblar	1986–87, 1990–91	–	2	N/A			–	2	
(Socialist Federal Republic of Yugoslavia) (Croatia) Tomislav Ivić	1972, 1973–76, 1978–80, 1987, 1997	3	4	–	–	–	–	7	
(Socialist Federal Republic of Yugoslavia) (Croatia) Petar Nadoveza	1982–84, 1988–89, 2000, 2004	–	1	1	1	–	–	3	(Note: Nadoveza won Prva HNL Title in 2004 as an interim manager after Zoran Vulić was sacked only three rounds before end of the season.)
(Socialist Federal Republic of Yugoslavia) (Croatia) Stanko Poklepović	1984–86, 1991–93, 2010, 2015	–	–	1	1	1	–	3	
(Croatia) Ivan Katalinić	1993–95, 1998–99, 2004	N/A		2	2	3	–	7	
(Croatia) Zoran Vulić	1998, 2000–01, 2002–04, 2006–07, 2018	N/A		1	1	–	–	2	
(Croatia) Igor Štimac	2005	N/A		1	–	–	–	1	(Note: Štimac won Prva HNL Title in 2005 as a caretaker manager (and at that time also a Director of football) after sacking Blaž Slišković eight rounds before end of the season.)
(Croatia) Miroslav Blažević	2005	N/A		–	–	1	–	1	
(Croatia) Igor Tudor	2013–15	N/A		–	1	–	–	1	(Note: Tudor won Croatian Cup in 2013 after leading the club only during Cup finals against Lokomotiva. The rest of the tournament was led by his predecessor Mišo Krstičević.)
(Lithuania) Valdas Dambrauskas	2021–22	N/A		–	1	–	–	1	(Note: Dambrauskas won Croatian Cup in 2022 after leading the club from the quarter-finals. In the first and second round the club was led by his predecessor Jens Gustafsson.)
(Croatia) Ivan Leko	2022–23	N/A		–	1	–	–	1	(Note: Leko won Croatian Cup in 2023 after leading the club from the quarter-finals. In the first and second round the club was led by his predecessor Mislav Karoglan.)
Total	1911–	9	9	9	8	5	–	41	

^{2} Croatian First League was temporarily played during 1940's, under flags of Banate of Croatia, Independent State of Croatia and Socialist Republic of Croatia. Hajduk won a title in Banate of Croatia (1940), two in SR Croatia (1945, 1946) while refusing to participate in championships during Independent State of Croatia (1941–45).
