= 1953 Yugoslav Cup =

1953 Yugoslav Football Cup
7th Marshal Tito Cup

Tournament details
- Country: Yugoslavia
- Dates: 23 August – 29 November
- Teams: 16

Final positions
- Champions: BSK Beograd (1st title)
- Runners-up: Hajduk Split

Tournament statistics
- Matches played: 15
- Goals scored: 65 (4.33 per match)
- Goals scored in penalty shoot-outs not included.

The 1953 Yugoslav Cup was the 7th season of the top football knockout competition in SFR Yugoslavia, the Yugoslav Cup (Serbo-Croatian: Kup Jugoslavije), also known as the "Marshal Tito Cup" (Kup Maršala Tita), since its establishment in 1946.

== Round of 16 ==
In the following tables winning teams are marked in bold; teams from outside top level are marked in italic script.

Tie no	Home team	Score	Away team
1	**BSK Beograd**	5–1	Sutjeska Nikšić (III)
2	**Hajduk Split**	2–0	Vardar II (?)
3	Metalac Zagreb (III)	2–4	**Dinamo Zagreb**
4	**Odred Ljubljana**	4–0	BSK Beograd II (?)
5	**Partizan**	2–0 (a.e.t.)	Sarajevo
6	Proleter Osijek	0–1	**Vojvodina**
7	**Red Star**	1–0	Velež (II)
8	**Spartak Subotica**	5–2	Šumadija Beograd (?)

== Quarter-finals ==
Tie no	Home team	Score	Away team
1	**BSK Beograd**	5–1	Spartak Subotica
2	Partizan	5–5 (7–8 p)	**Dinamo Zagreb**
3	**Red Star**	4–2	Odred Ljubljana
4	Vojvodina	1–2	**Hajduk Split**

== Semi-finals ==
Tie no	Home team	Score	Away team
1	Dinamo Zagreb	1–2	**BSK Beograd**
2	**Hajduk Split**	4–2 (a.e.t.)	Red Star

== Final ==
29 November 1953

BSK Beograd	2–0	Hajduk Split
Antić 5'; Panić 17'

Stadion JNA, Belgrade
Attendance: 50,000
Referee: T. Ivanovski (Skopje)

BSK BELGRADE:
GK	1	(Socialist Federal Republic of Yugoslavia) Petar Radenković
DF	2	(Socialist Federal Republic of Yugoslavia) Zdravko Juričko
DF	3	(Socialist Federal Republic of Yugoslavia) Nikola Radović
DF	4	(Socialist Federal Republic of Yugoslavia) Lazar Tasić
DF	5	(Socialist Federal Republic of Yugoslavia) Vojislav Vidić
	6	(Socialist Federal Republic of Yugoslavia) Sreten Davidović
	7	(Socialist Federal Republic of Yugoslavia) Aleksandar Panić
	8	(Socialist Federal Republic of Yugoslavia) Sava Antić
	9	(Socialist Federal Republic of Yugoslavia) Predrag Marković
	10	(Socialist Federal Republic of Yugoslavia) Tomislav Kaloperović
	11	(Socialist Federal Republic of Yugoslavia) Zoran Prljinčević
Manager:
(Socialist Federal Republic of Yugoslavia) Blagoje Marjanović

HAJDUK SPLIT:
GK	1	(Socialist Federal Republic of Yugoslavia) Vladimir Beara
DF	2	(Socialist Federal Republic of Yugoslavia) Svemir Delić
DF	3	(Socialist Federal Republic of Yugoslavia) Davor Grčić
DF	4	(Socialist Federal Republic of Yugoslavia) Božo Broketa
DF	5	(Socialist Federal Republic of Yugoslavia) Lenko Grčić
MF	6	(Socialist Federal Republic of Yugoslavia) Slavko Luštica
MF	7	(Socialist Federal Republic of Yugoslavia) Krešimir Arapović
MF	8	(Socialist Federal Republic of Yugoslavia) Božidar Senčar
FW	9	(Socialist Federal Republic of Yugoslavia) Bernard Vukas
FW	10	(Socialist Federal Republic of Yugoslavia) Frane Matošić
FW	11	(Socialist Federal Republic of Yugoslavia) Joško Vidošević
Manager:
(Socialist Federal Republic of Yugoslavia) Jozo Matošić

== See also ==
- 1953–54 Yugoslav First League
- 1953–54 Yugoslav Second League
