= 1955 Yugoslav Cup =

1955 Yugoslav Football Cup
9th Marshal Tito Cup

Tournament details
- Country: Yugoslavia
- Dates: 1 September – 29 November
- Teams: 16

Final positions
- Champions: BSK Beograd (2nd title)
- Runners-up: Hajduk Split

Tournament statistics
- Matches played: 14
- Goals scored: 55 (3.93 per match)
- Goals scored in penalty shoot-outs not included.

The 1955 Yugoslav Cup was the 9th season of the top football knockout competition in SFR Yugoslavia, the Yugoslav Cup (Serbo-Croatian: Kup Jugoslavije), also known as the "Marshal Tito Cup" (Kup Maršala Tita), since its establishment in 1946.

== First round proper ==
In the following tables winning teams are marked in bold; teams from outside top level are marked in italic script.

| Tie no | Home team | Score | Away team |
|---|---|---|---|
| 1 | **BSK Beograd** | 4–0 | Vardar |
| 2 | **Hajduk Split** | 4–2 (a.e.t.) | Budućnost Titograd |
| 3 | Metalac Zagreb | 1–2 | **Radnički Beograd** |
| 4 | Napredak Kruševac | 0–3 (p.f.) | **Dinamo Zagreb** |
| 5 | Sarajevo | 2–4 (a.e.t.) | **Red Star** |
| 6 | **Spartak Subotica** | 7–1 | Odred Ljubljana |
| 7 | **Vojvodina** | 5–0 | Novi Sad |
| 8 | **NK Zagreb** | 2–0 | Velež |

== Quarter-finals ==
| Tie no | Home team | Score | Away team |
|---|---|---|---|
| 1 | **BSK Beograd** | 2–1 | Radnički Beograd |
| 2 | **Red Star** | 4–1 (a.e.t.) | Dinamo Zagreb |
| 3 | **Spartak Subotica** | 2–0 | Vojvodina |
| 4 | NK Zagreb | 0–3 | **Hajduk Split** |

== Semi-finals ==
| Tie no | Home team | Score | Away team |
|---|---|---|---|
| 1 | **BSK Beograd** | 4–0 | Red Star |
| 2 | **Hajduk Split** | 2–0 | Spartak Subotica |

== Final ==
29 November 1955

| BSK Beograd | 2–0 | Hajduk Split |
|---|---|---|
| Marković 3'; Antić 15' |

Stadion JNA, Belgrade
Attendance: 20,000
Referee: T. Ivanovski (Skopje)

BSK BEOGRAD:
| GK | (Socialist Federal Republic of Yugoslavia) Dušan Cvetković |
| | (Socialist Federal Republic of Yugoslavia) Zdravko Juričko |
| | (Socialist Federal Republic of Yugoslavia) Dimitrije Stojanović |
| | (Socialist Federal Republic of Yugoslavia) Vasilije Šijaković |
| | (Socialist Federal Republic of Yugoslavia) Milan Kranjčić |
| | (Socialist Federal Republic of Yugoslavia) Petar Đorđević |
| | (Socialist Federal Republic of Yugoslavia) Živko Josić |
| | (Socialist Federal Republic of Yugoslavia) Sava Antić |
| | (Socialist Federal Republic of Yugoslavia) Predrag Marković |
| | (Socialist Federal Republic of Yugoslavia) Tihomir Jelisavčić |
| | (Socialist Federal Republic of Yugoslavia) Vladimir Šenauer |
Manager:
(Socialist Federal Republic of Yugoslavia) Blagoje Marjanović

HAJDUK SPLIT:
| GK | (Socialist Federal Republic of Yugoslavia) Ante Vulić |
| DF | (Socialist Federal Republic of Yugoslavia) Ljubomir Kokeza |
| DF | (Socialist Federal Republic of Yugoslavia) Davor Grčić |
| DF | (Socialist Federal Republic of Yugoslavia) Miroslav Brkljača |
| DF | (Socialist Federal Republic of Yugoslavia) Nikola Radović |
| MF | (Socialist Federal Republic of Yugoslavia) Slavko Luštica |
| MF | (Socialist Federal Republic of Yugoslavia) Ante Žanetić |
| MF | (Socialist Federal Republic of Yugoslavia) Žarko Maksan |
| FW | (Socialist Federal Republic of Yugoslavia) Bernard Vukas |
| FW | (Socialist Federal Republic of Yugoslavia) Sulejman Rebac |
| FW | (Socialist Federal Republic of Yugoslavia) Joško Vidošević |
Manager:
(Socialist Federal Republic of Yugoslavia) Ljubo Benčić

== See also ==
- 1955–56 Yugoslav First League
- 1955–56 Yugoslav Second League
