= 1952–53 Yugoslav First League =

Prva savezna liga
- Season: 1952–53
- Champions: Red Star (2nd title)
- Relegated: Velež; Napredak Kruševac
- Matches played: 132
- Goals scored: 452 (3.42 per match)
- Top goalscorer: Todor Živanović (17)

== Teams ==
Two clubs relegated at the end of the previous season were Rabotnički and Mačva. Teams promoted to the 1952–53 Yugoslav First League were Velež and Spartak.

Team	Location	Federal Republic	Position in 1952
BSK Belgrade	Belgrade	SR Serbia	5th
Dinamo Zagreb	Zagreb	SR Croatia	4th
Hajduk Split	Split	SR Croatia	1st
Lokomotiva	Zagreb	SR Croatia	3rd
Partizan	Belgrade	SR Serbia	6th
Red Star	Belgrade	SR Serbia	2nd
Sarajevo	Sarajevo	SR Bosnia and Herzegovina	9th
Spartak	Subotica	SR Serbia	—
Vardar	Skopje	SR Macedonia	7th
Velež	Mostar	SR Bosnia and Herzegovina	—
Vojvodina	Novi Sad	SR Serbia	8th
NK Zagreb	Zagreb	SR Croatia	10th

== League table ==
Pos	Team	Pld	W	D	L	GF	GA	GD	Pts	Relegation
1	Red Star Belgrade (C)	22	13	5	4	47	27	+20	31	
2	Hajduk Split	22	11	7	4	49	35	+14	29	
3	Partizan	22	11	3	8	58	36	+22	25	
4	Vojvodina	22	10	4	8	37	36	+1	24	
5	BSK Belgrade	22	9	5	8	34	37	−3	23	
6	Sarajevo	22	9	4	9	39	33	+6	22	
7	Dinamo Zagreb	22	8	6	8	32	30	+2	22	
8	Lokomotiva	22	6	9	7	33	40	−7	21	
9	Vardar	22	7	5	10	37	46	−9	19	
10	Spartak Subotica	22	8	3	11	33	44	−11	19	
11	Velež (R)	22	6	3	13	30	51	−21	15	Relegation to Yugoslav Second League
12	NK Zagreb (R)	22	5	4	13	23	37	−14	14	Relegation to Yugoslav Second League

Source: rsssf.org
Rules for classification: 1) points; 2) goal difference; 3) number of goals scored.
(C) Champions; (R) Relegated

== Results ==
Home \ Away	BSK	DIN	HAJ	LOK	PAR	RSB	SAR	SPA	VAR	VEL	VOJ	ZAG
BSK Belgrade		1–0	4–2	0–2	1–0	1–3	1–0	4–3	1–1	2–4	3–1	3–0
Dinamo Zagreb	1–1		5–1	4–3	1–3	2–1	0–0	3–0	1–1	4–0	4–2	0–0
Hajduk Split	0–2	2–0		1–1	4–2	2–2	1–1	3–1	2–0	1–0	6–1	6–3
Lokomotiva	1–1	1–1	4–4		2–1	1–1	2–1	1–2	1–1	1–2	1–1	2–0
Partizan	5–1	3–2	2–4	3–0		2–4	2–2	6–2	9–2	4–1	4–0	2–1
Red Star	5–3	3–0	1–4	3–2	1–1		2–1	5–1	0–0	4–0	1–1	3–1
Sarajevo	2–3	3–0	0–0	7–2	2–1	0–1		3–2	5–1	2–0	0–1	2–1
Spartak Subotica	2–0	1–1	0–0	0–1	2–1	1–4	3–1		3–1	4–0	1–0	3–0
Vardar	2–1	0–1	2–2	1–2	3–1	3–1	4–2	5–1		5–2	0–1	2–1
Velež	0–0	3–1	1–2	0–0	0–4	0–1	1–2	2–0	3–1		3–5	2–0
Vojvodina	1–1	1–0	1–2	4–1	1–1	0–1	5–1	2–0	3–1	5–3		0–2
NK Zagreb	2–0	0–1	2–0	2–2	0–1	1–0	0–2	1–1	3–1	3–3	0–1	

Source: DataSoccer.it
Legend: Blue = home team win; Yellow = draw; Red = away team win.

== Winning squad ==
Champions:

- RED STAR BELGRADE (coach: Bane Sekulić, replaced by Žarko Mihajlović)

players (league matches/league goals):

- Miljan Zeković (22/0)
- Todor Živanović (21/17)
- Branko Stanković (21/1)
- Predrag Đajić (21/1)
- Siniša Zlatković (21/0)
- Rajko Mitić (18/8)
- Tihomir Ognjanov (17/3)
- Milorad Diskić (17/0)
- Branislav Vukosavljević (13/8)
- Kosta Tomašević (9/3)
- Dimitrije Tadić (7/0)
- Jovan Cokić (6/2)
- Bela Palfi (6/1)
- Vasilije Šijaković (6/1)
- Ljuba Spajić (6/0)
- Dragoljub Župac (3/0)
- Milivoje Đurđević (2/0)
- Branko Nešović (1/0)
- Svetislav Milić (1/0)
- Miodrag Petrović (1/0)
- Miroslav Lazić (1/0)

== Top scorers ==
Rank	Player	Club	Goals
1	(Socialist Federal Republic of Yugoslavia) Todor Živanović	Red Star	17
2	(Socialist Federal Republic of Yugoslavia) Zdravko Rajkov	Vojvodina	16
3	(Socialist Federal Republic of Yugoslavia) Todor Veselinović	Partizan	15
3	(Socialist Federal Republic of Yugoslavia) Marko Valok	Partizan	15
5	(Socialist Federal Republic of Yugoslavia) Bernard Vukas	Hajduk Split	12
5	(Socialist Federal Republic of Yugoslavia) Vladimir Firm	Lokomotiva	12
7	(Socialist Federal Republic of Yugoslavia) Frane Matošić	Hajduk Split	11
7	(Socialist Federal Republic of Yugoslavia) Božo Broketa	Hajduk Split	11
9	(Socialist Federal Republic of Yugoslavia) Vladimir Zelenika	Velež	10
9	(Socialist Federal Republic of Yugoslavia) Dobrivoje Živkov	Sarajevo	10
9	(Socialist Federal Republic of Yugoslavia) Đorđe Cincijevski	Vardar	10

== See also ==
- 1952–53 Yugoslav Second League
- 1952 Yugoslav Cup
