= Miljan Zeković =

Montenegrin footballer

Personal information
- Full name: Miljan Zeković
- Date of birth: 15 November 1925
- Place of birth: Nikšić, Kingdom of Yugoslavia
- Date of death: 10 December 1993 (aged 68)
- Position: Left-back

Senior career*
Years	Team	Apps	(Gls)
1944–1948	Sutjeska Nikšić		
1948–1950	Budućnost Titograd		
1951–1960	Red Star Belgrade	168	(1)
1961–1962	Čelik Zenica	13	(1)
1962–1965	Grazer AK	15	(6)

International career
1952–1955	Yugoslavia	13	(0)

Managerial career
- Dubočica
- 1969–1970: Ethnikos Piraeus
- 1970–1971: Veria
- 1971–1972: Kalamata
- 1972–1973: Panserraikos
- 1973–1974: Pierikos
- 1974–1975: Kalamata
- 1976: Sloga Kraljevo
- 1976–1977: Panetolikos
- * Club domestic league appearances and goals

Miljan Zeković (Cyrillic: Миљан Зековић; 15 November 1925 – 10 December 1993) was a Montenegrin and Yugoslav football player and manager.

== Playing career ==
=== Club ===
He played for FK Sutjeska Nikšić and FK Budućnost Titograd before coming, in 1951, to become one of the memorable left-backs in Red Star Belgrade, where he will play until 1960, winning four National Championships, in 1952-53, 1955-56, 1956-57 and 1958-59, and two Cups, in 1958 and 1959. After leaving the Belgrade club, he played one season as striker with NK Čelik Zenica, before joining Bernard Vukas in Austrian Bundesliga club Grazer AK where he played three seasons, until 1965.

=== International ===
He played a total of 13 matches for the Yugoslavia national football team. His debut was on 21 September 1952 in Belgrade, a 4–2 win against Austria, and his fairway match was on 11 November 1955, in Paris, a 1–1 draw against France.

== Managerial career ==
After retiring as a player, he worked one season as a coach with FK Dubočica, before leaving to Greece where he worked for six clubs in eight years.
