= 1956 Croatia–Indonesia football match =

PR Croatia–Indonesia
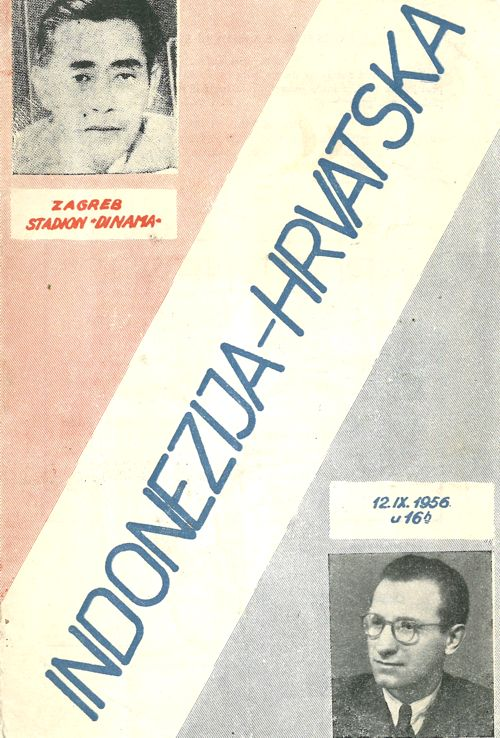
| PR Croatia | Indonesia |
| (Socialist Republic of Croatia) | (Indonesia) |
| 5 | 2 |
- Date: 12 September 1956
- Venue: Maksimir Stadium, Zagreb
- Attendance: 12,000

On 12 September 1956 Croatia hosted Indonesia in an international friendly in Zagreb. Until the 1990 match against the United States, this was Croatia's only match against a foreign national team while it was a part of the Socialist Federal Republic of Yugoslavia.

== Background ==
Indonesia previously played Yugoslavia at JNA Stadium in Belgrade on 9 September. Yugoslavia won the match 4–2.

== Match details ==
12 September 1956

| PR Croatia | 5–2 | Indonesia |
|---|---|---|
| Matuš 9'; Krstulović 13'; Rebac 17', 54'; Benko 43' | Report | Tan Liong Houw 24'; Endang 70' |

Maksimir Stadium, Zagreb, Yugoslavia
Attendance: 12,000

== Squads ==
Croatia
| Ante Vulić |
| Svemir Delić |
| Ante Vidošević |
| Stanko Krstulović |
| Vladimir Klaić |
| Ante Žanetić |
| Sulejman Rebac |
| Željko Matuš |
| Dražan Jerković |
| Jole Vidošević |
| Aleksandar Benko |
Substitutes:
| Ivan Medle |
Manager:
(Socialist Federal Republic of Yugoslavia) Bogdan Cuvaj

Indonesia
| Maulwi Saelan |
| Chairuddin Siregar |
| Thio Him Tjiang |
| Rukma Sudjana |
| Kwee Kiat Sek |
| Tan Liong Houw |
| Ade Dana |
| Endang Witarsa |
| Phwa Sian Liong |
| Ashari Danoe |
| Djamiat Dalhar |
Substitutes:
| Paidjo |
| Lie Kian An |
Manager:
(Socialist Federal Republic of Yugoslavia) Antun Pogačnik

== See also ==
- 1990 Croatia v United States soccer match
