= Ante Žaja =

Croatian footballer

Personal information
- Full name: Ante Žaja
- Date of birth: 18 November 1941 (age 84)
- Place of birth: Šibenik, SR Croatia, Yugoslavia
- Position: Defender

Senior career*
Years	Team	Apps	(Gls)
1957–1961	Šibenik		
1961–1969	Hajduk Split	87	(5)
1969–1970	Zagreb		
Total		87	(5)
- * Club domestic league appearances and goals

Ante Žaja (born 18 November 1941) is a retired Croatian footballer.

== Career ==
Žaja began playing football in his home town of Šibenik with the club HNK Šibenik in 1957. In 1961, he moved to Hajduk Split, where he won the Yugoslav Cup in 1966-67. He is considered a legend of Šibenik and Hajduk Split.

In 2001 he won the "Matija Ljubek" career Award from the Croatian Olympic Committee.

== Honours ==
=== Player ===
Hajduk Split

- Yugoslav Cup: 1966–67
