= Ante Vidošević =

Croatian footballer (1925–1975)

Personal information
- Full name: Ante Vidošević
- Date of birth: 2 October 1925
- Place of birth: Sinj, Split Oblast, Kingdom of Serbs, Croats and Slovenes
- Date of death: 23 August 1975 (aged 49)
- Place of death: Zagreb, SR Croatia, SFR Yugoslavia
- Position: Defender

Senior career*
Years	Team	Apps	(Gls)
- RNK Split
- NK Zagreb

International career
1956	PR Croatia	1	(0)
- * Club domestic league appearances and goals

Ante Vidošević (2 October 1925 – 23 August 1975) was a Croatian footballer who played as a defender and made one appearance for the Croatia national team.

== Career ==
Vidošević earned his first and only cap for Croatia in the team's 1956 friendly match against Indonesia. The fixture, which was played on 12 September in Zagreb, finished as a 5–2 win for Croatia. It was however unofficial since Croatia was part of SFR Yugoslavia.

== Personal life ==
Vidošević died on 23 August 1975 in Zagreb at the age of 49.

== Career statistics ==
=== International ===
PR Croatia
Year	Apps	Goals
1956	1	0
Total	1	0
