= Ozren Nedoklan =

Yugoslav footballer and manager (1922–2004)

Personal information
- Date of birth: 2 October 1922
- Place of birth: Split, Kingdom of SCS
- Date of death: 2 September 2004 (aged 81)
- Place of death: Split, Croatia
- Positions: Centre forward; centre-half

Senior career*
Years	Team	Apps	(Gls)
1930s	RNK Split		
1944–1945	Hajduk Split		
1946	Akademičar		
1957–1959	Bellinzona		

Managerial career
- 1950s: Dalmatinac
- 1957–1959: Bellinzona
- 1959–1960: Istra
- 1964–1965: Hajduk Split
- 1965–1966: RNK Split
- 1968–1971: CA Bizertin
- 1974–1975: EM Mahdia
- 1975–1977: Olympique du Kef
- 1977: CA Bizertin
- 1979–1981: SA Menzel Bourguiba
- * Club domestic league appearances and goals

Ozren Nedoklan (2 October 1922 – 2 September 2004) was a Yugoslav football player and manager. He played as a centre forward and later as a centre-half._
