= Ljubo Benčić =

Croatian footballer

Personal information
- Full name: Ljubomir Benčić
- Date of birth: 2 January 1905
- Place of birth: Stari Grad, Austria-Hungary
- Date of death: 24 February 1992 (aged 87)
- Place of death: Zagreb, Croatia
- Position: Forward

Senior career*
Years	Team	Apps	(Gls)
1923–1933	Hajduk Split	52	(28)

International career
1924–1927	Kingdom of Serbs, Croats and Slovenes	5	(2)

Managerial career
- 1939–1941: Hajduk Split
- 1944–1948: Hajduk Split
- 1945: Milicioner Zagreb
- 1952: Rijeka
- 195x–1955: NK Zagreb
- 1957: Bologna
- 1959–1961: Pescara
- 1963–1964: Portogruaro
- 1964–1965: Pescara
- Trešnjevka
- Zadar
- * Club domestic league appearances and goals

Ljubomir "Ljubo" Benčić (2 January 1905 – 24 February 1992) was a Croatian and Yugoslav football player and coach.

== Playing career ==
=== Club ===
Spending his entire career at Hajduk Split, Benčić was a right winger and centre forward. He started playing top-flight football in 1921 and by 1923 he became the club's best all-time scorer with a total of 43 goals. In 1925 he played his 100th game for the Whites, and in 1930 he scored his 300th goal for Hajduk. Until his retirement in 1935 he scored 355 goals in 353 unofficial games for Hajduk, which makes him currently Hajduk's third all-time goalscorer (behind Frane Matošić with 729 and Leo Lemešić with 445 goals). With Hajduk he won two Yugoslav championship titles, in 1927 and 1929, and was also the league's top scorer in 1928, scoring 8 goals in 5 games.

=== International ===
Between 1924 and 1927 Benčić earned 5 caps and scored 2 goals for the Kingdom of Serbs, Croats and Slovenes national football team. He debuted on 28 September 1924 against Czechoslovakia and his last game for the national team was on 28 October 1927 against Czechoslovakia in Prague. The game ended in a 7–1 defeat, and Benčić scored the only goal for his team. He was also part of the Kingdom of Serbs, Croats and Slovenes' team at the 1928 Summer Olympics, but he did not play in any matches.

== Managerial career ==
After he stopped playing in 1935 he stayed in football and had two stints as manager of Hajduk: from 1939 to 1941 (the last two seasons before World War II, during the war, and then the first few seasons after the war from 1946 to 1948. When he moved to Zagreb he managed NK Milicioner (which later merged with NK Borac to form NK Zagreb). In 1957 he managed Bologna FC with Bernard Vukas. Upon returning to Croatia he managed NK Trešnjevka and NK Zadar. Benčić died in 1992 in Zagreb.

== Honours ==
- Yugoslav Championship: 1927, 1929
- Yugoslav Championship top scorer: 1928
