= Ivo Radovniković =

Croatian footballer and manager

Personal information
- Date of birth: 9 February 1918
- Place of birth: Split, Austria-Hungary
- Date of death: 27 October 1977 (aged 59)
- Place of death: Split, SFR Yugoslavia
- Position: Midfielder

Youth career
- 1930–1936: Hajduk Split

Senior career*
Years	Team	Apps	(Gls)
1936–1953	Hajduk Split	117	(23)

Managerial career
- 1955–1958: Hajduk Split (youth)
- 1958–1959: Hajduk Split
- Sloga Doboj
- 1963–1964: RNK Split
- * Club domestic league appearances and goals

Ivo "Ive" Radovniković (9 February 1918 – 27 October 1977) was a Croatian football player and manager.

== Playing career ==
A native of Split, Radovniković joined local powerhouse Hajduk Split in 1930 at the age of 12, and debuted professionally for the club six years later in a match against SK Bata Borovo. In the next 17 years with the club he appeared in a total of 475 matches and scored 160 goals (including 117 appearances and 23 goals in the Yugoslav First League). With the club he won the Banovina of Croatia championship in 1941 and two Yugoslav First League titles in 1950 and 1952.

During World War II when Hajduk was briefly disbanded by the authorities he was one of the players who joined the re-established club in exile on the island of Vis (which was at the time stronghold of the Yugoslav Partisans) and where Hajduk played exhibition matches until the end of the war. He holds the distinction of appearing in 85 matches for the war-time Hajduk squad. Although he was never capped for Yugoslavia, he was member of the Yugoslav squad which competed in the 1950 World Cup in Brazil.

== Managerial career ==
After retiring from football at the end of the 1952–53 season, he became a manager. He returned to Hajduk and managed their youth team from 1955 to 1958, before taking over as manager in the 1958–59 season and finishing seventh in the national championship. After that he had managing stints with several lower level sides, including Sloga Doboj and RNK Split.
