= Ante Žanetić =

Croatian footballer (1936–2014)

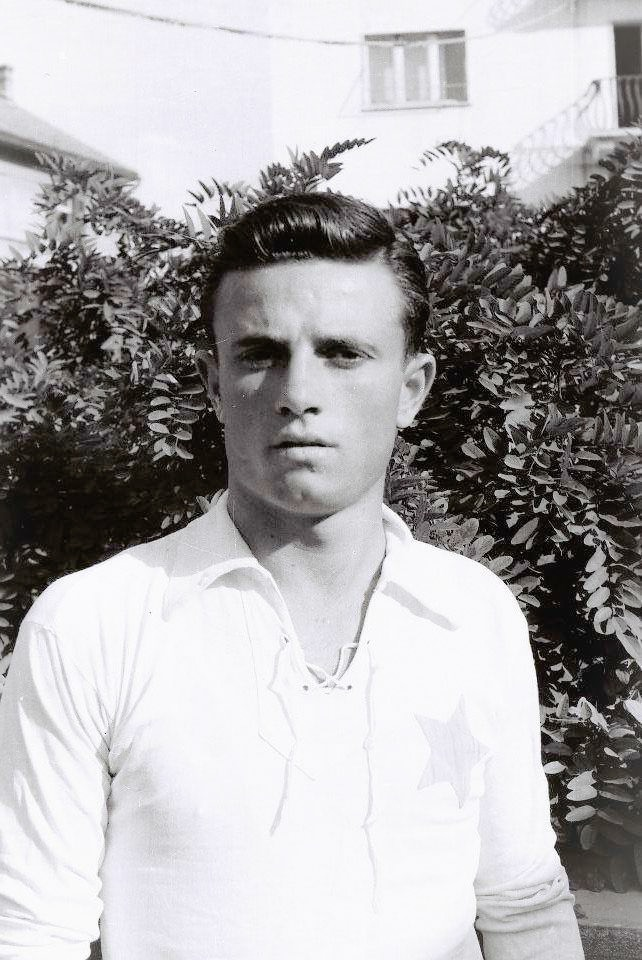

Personal information
- Full name: Ante Žanetić Zalante
- Date of birth: 18 November 1936
- Place of birth: Blato, Korčula, Kingdom of Yugoslavia
- Date of death: 18 December 2014 (aged 78)
- Place of death: Wollongong, Australia
- Position: Midfielder

Youth career
- 1946–1953: BŠK Zmaj Blato

Senior career*
| Years | Team | Apps | (Gls) |
| 1953–1954 | GOŠK Dubrovnik | | |
| 1954–1961 | Hajduk Split | 114 | (11) |
| 1961–1964 | Club Brugge K.V. | 3 | (1) |
| 1964–1966 | Racing White | 1 | (0) |

International career
| 1956 | PR Croatia | 1 | (0) |
| 1959–1960 | Yugoslavia | 15 | (2) |
Medal record
Men's Football
Representing Yugoslavia
Olympic Games
| Gold medal – first place | 1960 Rome | Team |
European Championship
| Silver medal – second place | 1960 France | Team |
- * Club domestic league appearances and goals

Ante Žanetić (18 November 1936 – 18 December 2014) was a Croatian professional footballer who played as a midfielder.

== Club career ==
During his club career he played for NK Hajduk Split, Club Brugge K.V. and Racing White.

Žanetić later decided to leave Yugoslavia in order to play football in west Europe. He abandoned the Hajduk Split squad while the team was in Germany in 1961 and moved to Belgium where he played for Club Brugge K.V. and Racing White. He subsequently emigrated to Australia. He died there in 2014.

== International career ==
Žanetić earned 15 caps for the Yugoslavia national football team, and participated in the 1960 European Nations' Cup and on the Yugoslavian team that won the 1960 Olympics. He also played a friendly match for the PR Croatia national team against Indonesia. His final international was a September 1960 Olympic Games match against Denmark.
