= Ante Vulić =

Croatian footballer

Personal information
- Full name: Ante Vulić
- Date of birth: 16 August 1928
- Place of birth: Split, Kingdom of Yugoslavia
- Date of death: 7 August 1993 (aged 64)
- Place of death: Split, Croatia
- Position: Goalkeeper

Senior career*
| Years | Team | Apps | (Gls) |
| 1951–1962 | Hajduk Split | 116 | (14) |
| Total | | 116 | (14) |

International career
| 1956 | PR Croatia | 1 | (0) |
- * Club domestic league appearances and goals

Ante Vulić (Croatian pronunciation: [ǎːnte ʋǔːlitɕ]; 16 August 1928 – 7 August 1993) was a Croatian professional footballer who played as a goalkeeper.

== Club career ==
He spent the entirety of his 11-year career with Hajduk Split, winning two Yugoslav league titles in 1952 and 1955. Although a talented goalkeeper, for a great part of his career he had to be a substitute to Vladimir Beara, who was named by legendary Soviet goalkeeper Lev Yashin as the greatest keeper of all time. However, he has never complained about that misfortune. According to Beara himself, Vulić was his best and most loyal friend, who even twice picked a fight to protect him. He still managed to become the second-most-capped Hajduk Split goalkeeper ever, with 339 games (116 in the league, 17 in the domestic cup, 4 international games and 202 friendlies, scoring 29 goals in total), after Radomir Vukčević (402). Despite being a long-time substitute to Beara, he was also known as an excellent penalty taker. Beara (who was the first goalkeeper ever to save a penalty to Ferenc Puskás in the 1952 Olympic finals, and who has also saved penalties from many other prominent strikers, having saved four penalties during a single game in a derby against Dinamo Zagreb) claimed that he has never seen a better penalty taker than Ante Vulić.

== International career ==
Vulić was capped in the only international game the Croatia national team played while Croatia was part of Yugoslavia, a 5–2 win against Indonesia in Zagreb, on 12 September 1956.

== Personal facts ==
Vulić's son, Zoran, also became a long-time player for Hajduk Split, the team's captain and later football manager, coaching Hajduk several times. Zoran also played internationally for Yugoslavia and Croatia and they are the only father and son who played for Croatia before its independence from Yugoslavia was established.
