= Jozo Matošić =

Yugoslav football coach and player

Personal information
- Full name: Jozo Matošić
- Date of birth: 27 January 1913
- Place of birth: Split, Austria-Hungary
- Date of death: 1 March 1999 (aged 86)
- Place of death: Dubrovnik, Croatia
- Positions: Defender; goalkeeper

Senior career*
Years	Team	Apps	(Gls)
1931–1946	Hajduk Split	187	(26)
1946–1947	Kvarner Rijeka	22	(3)

International career
1934–1940	Yugoslavia	24	(0)

Managerial career
- 1946–1947: Kvarner Rijeka
- 1950: RNK Split
- 1952–1954: Hajduk Split
- * Club domestic league appearances and goals

Jozo Matošić (27 January 1913 – 1 March 1999) was a Yugoslav football coach and player. He was captain of the famous Hajduk Split side during World War II. He was also the older brother of Frane Matošić, Hajduk's best goalscorer of all time.

== Career ==
He began his career at Hajduk Split as a goalkeeper but Luka Kaliterna made him a right-back. He was known for his great strength and character. He was also a regular player in the Yugoslavia national football team during the 1930s. He won the 1940–41 Croatian First League at that time also. From 1941 to 1944, he was in the Yugoslav Partisans. In 1944, he was captain of the Hajduk Split squad that was formed again on the island of Vis. From 1944 to 1945, he toured the Allied liberated territory with Hajduk Split. He won two SR Croatia championships after the war, in 1945 and 1946. In August 1946, Matošić moved to Kvarner (today's HNK Rijeka), where he was player–manager for the duration of the 1946–47 Yugoslav First League. Shortly thereafter, he retired from football.

Jozo Matošić is known for discovering Vladimir Beara, one of the best goalkeepers in the world during the 1950s.

During his managerial time at Hajduk Split, he won the 1952 Yugoslav First League. He later went to live in Dubrovnik where he worked at NK GOŠK. In his honour, the football academy in Dubrovnik was named after him.

== Honours ==
=== Player ===
Hajduk Split

- Banovina of Croatia (1): 1940–41

Hajduk Split

- Socialist Republic of Croatia (2): 1945, 1946

=== Coach ===
Hajduk Split

- Yugoslav First League (1):1952
