= Vladimir Šenauer =

Croatian footballer

Personal information
- Full name: Vladimir Schönauer
- Date of birth: 29 November 1930
- Place of birth: Split, Kingdom of Yugoslavia
- Date of death: 5 January 2013 (aged 82)
- Place of death: Split, Croatia
- Positions: Forward; left winger

Senior career*
Years	Team	Apps	(Gls)
1950–1954	Hajduk Split		
1955–1957	OFK Beograd		
1957–1962	Hajduk Split		
1962–1964	Austria Klagenfurt		
1964	RNK Split		

International career
1951	Yugoslavia B	2	(1)
- * Club domestic league appearances and goals

Vladimir "Geza" Šenauer (also spelled Schönauer; 29 November 1930 – 5 January 2013) was a Croatian and Yugoslav professional footballer.

== Early life and family ==
Šenauer was born in Split, Littoral Banovina, to Geza Schönauer, Jewish leather merchant from Daruvar, and Zorka (née Rakelić), Split born Catholic. He was raised Jewish by his family. His father owned the boutique and newsstand in Split. During World War II, officer of the Italian army protected the Schönauer family from persecutions. In 1943, he advised them to leave Split before the arrival of Nazis and Ustaše. In September 1943, the Independent State of Croatia took over the Split from the Italian fascists, so Šenauer and his family escaped to hide on the island of Vis. Soon after they escaped to Bari, Italy. Šenauer's paternal grandmother, most of his closer and wider family were killed during the Holocaust. Šenauer returned to Split in 1947, few days before his father.

== Football career ==
He spend most of his career playing for his hometown club HNK Hajduk Split winning with them 3 national championships. He also won one national cup in the period in between while he was playing with OFK Belgrade, curiously winning in the final against his former club, Hajduk. Before ending his career he also had a spell abroad with SK Austria Klagenfurt, before returning to finish his career playing with RNK Split. He was known for his speed and excellent execution of free kicks. After retiring he was an active member in the direction board of Hajduk, and between 1979 and 1990 he was the director of the Hajduk stadium, Poljud.

He made two appearances for the Yugoslav B national team, both in 1951, first in Tunis, on 14 October, against Tunisia (7–3 win with Šenauer scoring the lat goal), and second in Sfax, on 16 October, against South Tunisia (5–0 win).

== Death ==
Šenauer died on 5 January 2013 in Split, and was buried at the Lovrinac Cemetery.
