= Zdravko Juričko =

Yugoslav footballer (1929–2012)

Personal information
- Full name: Zdravko Juričko
- Date of birth: 29 March 1929
- Place of birth: Split, Kingdom of Yugoslavia
- Date of death: 23 February 2012 (aged 82)
- Place of death: Split, Croatia
- Position: Midfielder

Youth career
- 1946–1952: Hajduk Split

Senior career*
Years	Team	Apps	(Gls)
1946–1953	Hajduk Split	14	(2)
1953–1957	OFK Beograd	75	(5)

International career
- Yugoslavia B
- * Club domestic league appearances and goals

Zdravko Juričko (29 March 1929 – 23 February 2012) was a Yugoslav footballer.

== Club career ==
Born in Split, he played for HNK Hajduk Split in the Yugoslav First League. Then he moved to another Yugoslav top-flight side, OFK Beograd, known at that time as BSK, and he made 75 league appearances and scored 5 goals between 1953 and 1957. It was during that period that he became a regular at the Yugoslav B national team. Then he moved abroad to Switzerland.
