= Stane Krstulović =

Croatian footballer and manager

Personal information
- Full name: Andrija Stane Krstulović
- Date of birth: 17 October 1929
- Place of birth: Split, Littoral Banovina, Kingdom of Yugoslavia
- Date of death: 14 April 2012 (aged 82)
- Place of death: Split, Croatia
- Positions: Centre-forward; centre-back

Youth career
- –1949: Hajduk Split

Senior career*
Years	Team	Apps	(Gls)
1949–1958	Hajduk Split	130	(25)
1958–1961	RNK Split		

International career
1951	Yugoslavia B	2	(0)
1956	PR Croatia	1	(1)

Managerial career
- 1961: RNK Split
- * Club domestic league appearances and goals

Andrija Stane Krstulović (17 October 1929 – 14 April 2012) was a Croatian footballer and manager who played as a centre-forward or centre-back and made one appearance for the Croatia national team.

== International career ==
Krstulović earned his first and only cap for Croatia in the team's 1956 friendly match against Indonesia. The fixture, which was played on 12 September in Zagreb, finished as a 5–2 win for Croatia.

== Personal life ==
Krstulović died in a traffic collision on 14 April 2012 in Split at the age of 82.

== Career statistics ==
=== International ===
PR Croatia
Year	Apps	Goals
1956	1	1
Total	1	1

=== International goals ===
No.	Date	Venue	Opponent	Score	Result	Competition
1	12 September 1956	Stadion Maksimir, Zagreb, People's Republic of Croatia, Federal People's Republic of Yugoslavia	Indonesia	2–0	5–2	Friendly
