= Krešimir Arapović =

Croatian footballer and manager

Personal information
- Date of birth: 23 October 1924
- Place of birth: Čapljina, Kingdom of Serbs, Croats and Slovenes
- Date of death: 17 July 1994 (aged 69)
- Place of death: Split, Croatia
- Position: Midfielder

Senior career*
Years	Team	Apps	(Gls)
1945–1946	Neretva		
1947–1954	Hajduk Split	67	(20)
1954–1957	Srem		

Managerial career
- Srem
- Novi Sad
- Hajduk Split (youth)
- 1963–1964: Hajduk Split (assistant)
- Troglav Livno
- RNK Split
- 1968–1968: Sloboda Užice
- 1969–1971: Borac Banja Luka
- Sloga Mravinci
- * Club domestic league appearances and goals

Krešimir Arapović (23 November 1924 – 17 July 1994) was a Croatian football player and manager.

== Biography ==
Born in Čapljina, Mostar Oblast, in the Kingdom of Yugoslavia, he became a trophy winning HNK Hajduk Split player and coach. He played mostly as an offensive right-winger.

He started playing football while with the Partisans during the Second World War. In 1945 he became a player of NK Neretva where he played one season. In 1947 he started wearing the white shirt of Hajduk Split which he wore all the way until 1954. Nicknamed "Arap", he played with Hajduk a total of 216 matches having scored 81 goals, winning two national titles, in 1950 and 1952.

He leaves Split in direction of Sremska Mitrovica where he becomes player/manager of FK Srem. He earns his coaching diploma in Belgrade in 1961 and becomes the manager of Yugoslav Second League club FK Novi Sad. Afterwards, he coached the youth team of Hajduk Split in a period when the club was giving much emphasis to working and discovering young talents throughout the lower leagues. He was also the assistant manager of Milovan Ćirić during the 1963–64 season. Arapović insisted in the creation within the club of a B team where the reserve and younger players would gain the necessary experience, a practice which ended up being very successful, with many players from his team becoming regular starters in the main team in future. For a short period during June 1964 he was the club's main coach.

In his coaching career he also managed NK Troglav Livno, RNK Split, FK Sloboda Užice, FK Borac Banja Luka and Sloga Mravinci.

== Personal life ==
=== Death ===
He died on July 17, 1994, in Split and was buried in the city cemetery Lovrinac.

== Honours ==
Hajduk Split

- Yugoslav First League: 1950, 1952
