= Ante Mladinić =

Croatian footballer and manager

Personal information
- Date of birth: 1 October 1929
- Place of birth: Split, Kingdom of Yugoslavia
- Date of death: 13 June 2002 (aged 72)
- Place of death: Zagreb, Croatia
- Position: Defender

Senior career*
| Years | Team | Apps | (Gls) |
| 1947–1956 | Hajduk Split | 40 | (6) |
| 1954–1955 | Lokomotiva Zagreb | | |
| 1955–1956 | Hajduk Split | | |
| 1956–1958 | RNK Split | | |

Managerial career
- 1968–1974: Yugoslavia U21
- 1974–1976: Yugoslavia
- 1977–1978: Partizan
- 1978: Yugoslavia
- 1979–1980: Hajduk Split (assistant)
- 1980–1982: Hajduk Split
- * Club domestic league appearances and goals

Ante "Biće" Mladinić (1 October 1929 – 13 June 2002) was a Croatian football manager.

He had a modest playing career for Hajduk Split, for whom he scored 43 goals in 146 matches, and Lokomotiva Zagreb.

== Managerial career ==
Later, as coach, he had spells at NK Zagreb, Hajduk, FK Partizan and the Yugoslavia national football team in the mid-1970s. He ended his career as a staff member for Bordeaux, where he discovered players such as Bixente Lizarazu.

He died in Zagreb in 2002.
