= Luka Kaliterna =

Croatian footballer and manager

Personal information
- Date of birth: 13 October 1893
- Place of birth: Split, Kingdom of Dalmatia, Austria-Hungary
- Date of death: 25 February 1984 (aged 90)
- Place of death: Split, SR Croatia, Yugoslavia
- Position: Goalkeeper

Senior career*
Years	Team	Apps	(Gls)
1911–1923	Hajduk Split		

Managerial career
- 1923–1930: Hajduk Split
- 1930–1936: Hajduk Split
- 1937: Hajduk Split
- 1940–1941: RNK Split
- 1946–1947: RNK Split
- 1948–1951: Hajduk Split
- 1954–1958: RNK Split
- 1959–1960: Rijeka
- 1961–1962: RNK Split
- 1964–1966: Zadar
- 1966–1967: RNK Split
- * Club domestic league appearances and goals

Luka Kaliterna (13 October 1893 – 25 February 1984) was a Croatian football player and manager who played as a goalkeeper. Born in Split, he spent vast majority of his career with Split clubs Hajduk Split and RNK Split.

== See also ==
- Fabjan Kaliterna
