= Slavko Luštica =

Yugoslavian footballer

Personal information
- Date of birth: 11 January 1923
- Place of birth: Kumbor, Kingdom of SCS
- Date of death: 14 July 1992 (aged 69)
- Place of death: Split, Croatia
- Position: Wing-half

Youth career
- 1935–1936: Osvit Šibenik
- 1939–1941: Hajduk Split

Senior career*
Years	Team	Apps	(Gls)
1936–1939	Osvit Šibenik		
1941–1957	Hajduk Split	226	(19)

International career
1951–1952	Yugoslavia	3	(0)

Managerial career
- 1969–1972: Hajduk Split
- 1973–1976: Olimpija Ljubljana
- 1978: Yugoslavia
Medal record
Men's Football
Representing Yugoslavia
Olympic Games
Silver medal – second place	1952 Helsinki	Team
- * Club domestic league appearances and goals

Slavko Luštica (11 January 1923 – 14 July 1992) was a footballer who represented Yugoslavia at the 1952 Summer Olympics. He played club football in Yugoslavia with NK Osvit and Hajduk Split.

== Playing career ==
=== Club ===
Born in a small fishing community in the Bay of Kotor, Luštica started playing youth football at NK Osvit based in Šibenik, moving to the senior team at only 13 but he was first noticed by the public when he played in the Yugoslavia youth team which beat the then-powerful Hungary youth selection in Belgrade. Soon after that he signed for Hajduk Split, where he spent the rest of his playing career. His official debut for the club was on 9.3.1941 in a 5–2 win against Concordia Zagreb. During WW2 he played in all of Hajduk's games after the club escaped (and was temporarily relocated) to the island of Vis in 1944. After the war Luštica continued playing for Hajduk and won three Yugoslav championships (1950, 1952 and 1955). He appeared in a total of 634 games (making him third in Hajduk's list of all-time appearances, behind Frane Matošić and Ivan Hlevnjak) and scored a total of 86 goals.

=== International ===
He debuted for the national team on 23 August 1951 at a friendly against Norway in Oslo (which Yugoslavia won 4–2). He earned just two more caps, the last one in a 5–0 win against Egypt on 2 November 1952 in Belgrade.

== Managerial career ==
After his playing career ended, he coached Hajduk Split and won one championship title in 1971. He also coached NK Olimpija Ljubljana from 1973 to 1976.

== Honours ==
=== Player ===
- Yugoslav Championship: 1950, 1952, 1954–55

=== Manager ===
- Yugoslav Championship: 1970–71
