= Božo Broketa =

Croatian footballer (1922–1985)

Personal information
- Date of birth: 24 December 1922
- Place of birth: Dubrovnik, Kingdom of SCS
- Date of death: 25 July 1985 (aged 62)
- Place of death: Dubrovnik, SFR Yugoslavia
- Position: Defender

Youth career
- GOŠK Dubrovnik

Senior career*
Years	Team	Apps	(Gls)
1942–1945	Uskok Zagreb		
1946–1956	Hajduk Split	202	(26)
1956–1957	GOŠK Dubrovnik		
1957–1958	Limburgia		
1958–1959	Ajax	4	(0)

International career
1947–1948	Yugoslavia	3	(0)
Medal record
Men's Football
Representing Yugoslavia
Olympic Games
Silver medal – second place	1948 London	Team
- * Club domestic league appearances and goals

Božo Broketa (24 December 1922 – 25 July 1985) was a Yugoslav footballer who played as a defender.

== Club career ==
Broketa spent most of his career with Hajduk Split. He played four league matches for Dutch giants Ajax, when he already was 36 years of age.

A football academy in Dubrovnik is named after him.

== International career ==
Broketa made his debut for Yugoslavia in a May 1947 friendly match away against Czechoslovakia and earned a total of three caps. His final international was a June 1948 Balkan Cup match against Albania. He was also part of Yugoslavia's squad for the football tournament at the 1948 Summer Olympics, but he did not play in any matches.
