= Yugoslav Cup =

- Founded: 1923
- Abolished: 1992
- Region: Yugoslavia
- Last champions: Partizan (6)
- Most championships: Red Star Belgrade (12)

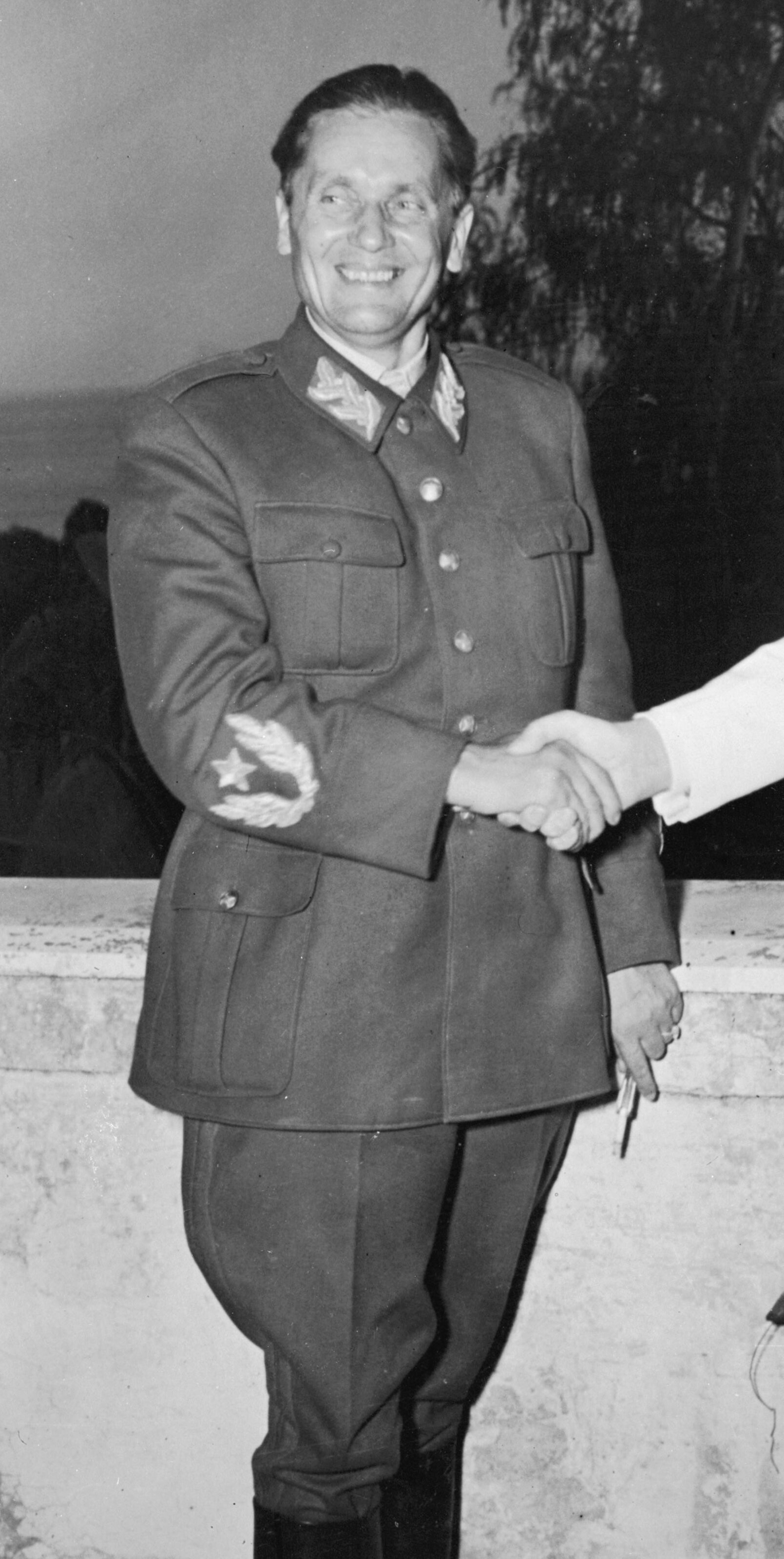
Marshal Tito, the former namesake of the cup

The Yugoslav Cup (Serbo-Croatian: Kup Jugoslavije / Куп Југославије; Slovene: Pokal Jugoslavije, Macedonian: Куп на Југославија, romanized: Kup na Jugoslavija), officially known as the King Alexander Cup (Serbo-Croatian: Kup kralja Aleksandra / Куп краља Александра), from 1924 to 1927, and as the Marshal Tito Cup (Serbo-Croatian: Kup maršala Tita / Куп маршала Тита; Slovene: Pokal maršala Tita; Macedonian: Куп на маршал Тито, romanized: Kup na maršal Tito), from 1947 to 1991, was one of two major football competitions in Yugoslavia, the other one being the Yugoslav League Championship. The Yugoslav Cup took place after the league championships when every competitive league in Yugoslavia had finished, in order to determine which teams are ranked as their corresponding seeds. The Marshal Tito Cup trophy was based on a design by Branko Šotra.

== Kingdom of Yugoslavia (1923–1941) ==
The pre-WW II competition in the then Kingdom of Slovenes, Croats and Serbs (renamed Kingdom of Yugoslavia at the end of 1929) was held irregularly, and sometimes involved only regional selections, sometimes only clubs, and occasionally both clubs and regions. Between 1924 and 1927 the competition consisted of squads from the regional subassociations. Only the players with citizenship of the Kingdom of Serbs, Croats and Slovenes were eligible.

=== List of winners ===
Season	Winner	Score	Runners–up
1923	HAŠK	2–0 (Zagreb clubs only)	HŠK Concordia
1924	Zagreb XI	3–2	Split XI
1925	Zagreb XI	3–1	Split XI
1926	Zagreb XI	3–1	Belgrade XI
1927	Belgrade XI	3–0	Subotica XI
1930–31	SAND	2–2, 2–1	SAŠK
1934	BSK	league	Hajduk Split
1936	SK Jugoslavija	1–2, 4–0	Građanski Zagreb
1938	Građanski Zagreb	4–1, 2–2	BSK
1938–40	SK Jugoslavija	5–1, 0–0	Slavija Sarajevo
1941	BSK	league (Belgrade region only during German occupation)	SK Jugoslavija

Split XI, losing finalists in 1924 and 1925, was composed of Hajduk Split players only. After their third successive win in 1926, Zagreb obtained the golden cup of King Aleksandar to keep.

== SFR Yugoslavia (1947–92) ==
=== Competition format ===
The competition format was an elimination championship where every competitive team was offered a chance to enter. Beginning in the lowest tiers of teams, the competition followed a one-game elimination format. Higher-tier teams got berths in the second round, third round, and so on. The First League (Prva Liga) teams always began in the 1/16 finals, and the rest of the 16 berths being filled by lower-tier teams who managed to make it to the round of 32.

Once the round of 16 was reached, the format would be changed to a two-game elimination format, being played at home and away for each team. At this point it became a First League ordeal, as the smaller teams had zero chance against the titans of Yugoslavian football. Historically, the finals were usually reached only by the better-performing First League teams (Partizan, Hajduk, Red Star, Dinamo, etc.). The only exception occurred in 1988 when the Cup was won by Borac Banja Luka, who were then competing in the Second League West.

=== Key ===
(R)	Replay
	Two-legged tie
*	Match went to extra time
†	Match decided by a penalty shoot-out after extra time
‡	Winning team won The Double
Italics	Team from outside the top level of Yugoslav football

=== List of winners ===
Season	Winner	Score	Runners–up	Venue(s)	Attendance
1947	Partizan ‡ (1)	2–0	Naša Krila Zemun	Stadion JNA	10,000
1948	Red Star (1)	3–0	Partizan	Stadion Crvene zvezde	30,000
1949	Red Star (2)	3–2	Naša Krila Zemun	Stadion JNA	50,000
1950	Red Star	1–1 *	Dinamo Zagreb	Stadion JNA	50,000
1950	Red Star (3)	3–0	Dinamo Zagreb	Stadion JNA	45,000
1951	Dinamo Zagreb (1)	4–0	Vojvodina	Stadion Maksimir; Stadion JNA	15,000; 20,000
1952	Partizan (2)	6–0	Red Star	Stadion JNA	60,000
1953	BSK Belgrade (1)	2–0	Hajduk Split	Stadion JNA	50,000
1954	Partizan (3)	4–1	Red Star	Stadion JNA	40,000
1955	BSK Belgrade (2)	2–0	Hajduk Split	Stadion JNA	20,000
1956–57	Partizan (4)	5–3	Radnički Belgrade	Stadion JNA	12,000
1957–58	Red Star (4)	4–0	Velež Mostar	Stadion JNA	30,000
1958–59	Red Star ‡ (5)	3–1	Partizan	Stadion JNA	50,000
1959–60	Dinamo Zagreb (2)	3–2	Partizan	Stadion JNA	40,000
1960–61	Vardar (1)	2–1	Varteks	Stadion JNA	15,000
1961–62	OFK Belgrade (3)	4–1	Spartak Subotica	Stadion JNA	10,000
1962–63	Dinamo Zagreb (3)	4–1	Hajduk Split	Stadion JNA	30,000
1963–64	Red Star ‡ (6)	3–0	Dinamo Zagreb	Stadion Crvene zvezde	60,000
1964–65	Dinamo Zagreb (4)	2–1	Budućnost Titograd	Stadion Crvene zvezde	13,000
1965–66	OFK Belgrade (4)	6–2	Dinamo Zagreb	Stadion JNA	35,000
1966–67	Hajduk Split (1)	2–1	Sarajevo	Stadion Stari plac	15,000
1967–68	Red Star ‡ (7)	7–0	Bor	Stadion Crvene zvezde	10,000
1968–69	Dinamo Zagreb (5)	3–3 *	Hajduk Split	Stadion JNA	20,000
(R)	Dinamo Zagreb (5)	3–0	Hajduk Split	Stadion JNA	15,000
1969–70	Red Star ‡ (8)	3–2 *	Olimpija Ljubljana	Stadion Bežigrad; Stadion Crvene zvezde	6,000; 30,000
1970–71	Red Star (9)	6–0	Sloboda Tuzla	Stadion Tušanj; Stadion Crvene zvezde	7,000; 6,000
1971–72	Hajduk Split (2)	2–1	Dinamo Zagreb	Stadion JNA	15,000
1973	Hajduk Split ‡ (3)	3–2	Red Star	Stadion Stari plac; Stadion Crvene zvezde	25,000; 10,000
1974	Hajduk Split ‡ (4)	1–0	Borac Banja Luka	Stadion JNA	20,000
1975–76	Hajduk Split (5)	1–0 *	Dinamo Zagreb	Stadion Crvene zvezde	60,000
1976–77	Hajduk Split (6)	2–0 *	Budućnost Titograd	Stadion Crvene zvezde	60,000
1977–78	Rijeka (1)	1–0 *	Trepča	Stadion Crvene zvezde	40,000
1978–79	Rijeka (2)	2–1	Partizan	Stadion Kantrida; Stadion Crvene zvezde	20,000; 55,000
1979–80	Dinamo Zagreb (6)	2–1	Red Star	Stadion Maksimir; Stadion Crvene zvezde	50,000; 50,000
1980–81	Velež Mostar (1)	3–2	Željezničar Sarajevo	Stadion Crvene zvezde	40,000
1981–82	Red Star (10)	6–4	Dinamo Zagreb	Stadion Maksimir; Stadion Crvene zvezde	50,000; 60,000
1982–83	Dinamo Zagreb (7)	3–2	Sarajevo	Stadion Crvene zvezde	25,000
1983–84	Hajduk Split (7)	2–1	Red Star	Stadion Poljud; Stadion Crvene zvezde	12,000; 70,000
1984–85	Red Star (11)	3–2	Dinamo Zagreb	Stadion Maksimir; Stadion JNA	40,000; 60,000
1985–86	Velež Mostar (2)	3–1	Dinamo Zagreb	Stadion JNA	40,000
1986–87	Hajduk Split (8)	1–1 †	Rijeka	Stadion JNA	30,000
1987–88	Borac Banja Luka (1)	1–0	Red Star	Stadion JNA	25,000
1988–89	Partizan (5)	6–1	Velež Mostar	Stadion JNA	35,000
1989–90	Red Star ‡ (12)	1–0	Hajduk Split	Stadion JNA	35,000
1990–91	Hajduk Split (9)	1–0	Red Star	Stadion JNA	7,000
1991–92	Partizan (6)	3–2	Red Star	Stadion Crvene zvezde, Stadion JNA	33,000; 40,000

- No participation of Croatian and Slovenian clubs. The only Macedonian club dropped out of competition in Round of 16. The last Bosnian club left the competition in May 1992 in Semi finals stage.

=== Results by team ===
Teams shown in italics are no longer in existence.

Club	Republic/Province	Winners	Last final won	Runners-up	Last final lost	Total apps
Red Star Belgrade	Serbia	12	1990	8	1992	20
Hajduk Split	Croatia	9	1991	5	1990	14
Dinamo Zagreb	Croatia	7	1983	8	1986	15
Partizan	Serbia	6	1992	4	1979	10
OFK Belgrade	Serbia	4	1966	–	–	4
Velež	Bosnia and Herzegovina	2	1986	2	1989	4
Rijeka	Croatia	2	1979	1	1987	3
Borac Banja Luka	Bosnia and Herzegovina	1	1988	1	1974	2
Vardar	Macedonia	1	1961	–	–	1
Sarajevo	Bosnia and Herzegovina	–	–	2	1983	2
Budućnost Titograd	Montenegro	–	–	2	1977	2
Naša Krila Zemun	Serbia	–	–	2	1949	2
Željezničar	Bosnia and Herzegovina	–	–	1	1981	1
Trepča	Kosovo	–	–	1	1978	1
Sloboda Tuzla	Bosnia and Herzegovina	–	–	1	1971	1
Olimpija Ljubljana	Slovenia	–	–	1	1970	1
Bor	Serbia	–	–	1	1968	1
Spartak Subotica	Vojvodina	–	–	1	1962	1
Varteks	Croatia	–	–	1	1961	1
Radnički Belgrade	Serbia	–	–	1	1957	1
Vojvodina	Vojvodina	–	–	1	1951	1

=== Performance by Republic/Province ===
Republic	Winner	Runner-Up	Appearances
SR Bosnia and Herzegovina	3	7	10
SR Croatia	18	15	33
SAP Kosovo	–	1	1
SR Macedonia	1	–	1
SR Montenegro	–	2	2
SR Slovenia	–	1	1
SR Serbia	22	16	38
SAP Vojvodina	–	2	2

== Successor cups ==
- Bosnia and Herzegovina → Bosnia and Herzegovina Football Cup (1994–present)
- Croatia → Croatian Football Cup (1992–present)
- Kosovo → Kosovar Cup (1991–present)
- North Macedonia → Macedonian Football Cup (1992–present)
- Montenegro → Montenegrin Cup (2006–present; from 1992 to 2006 had a joint cup with Serbia)
- Serbia → Serbian Cup (2006–present, from 1992 to 2006 had a joint cup with Montenegro)
- Slovenia → Slovenian Football Cup (1991–present)

== Sources ==
- Crvena Zvezda: All Cup Finals 1948-1992

== See also ==
- Serbia and Montenegro Cup
- Yugoslav First League
- Football Association of Yugoslavia
