= Frane Matošić =

Croatian footballer and coach

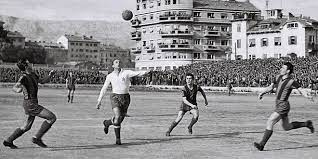

Personal information
- Date of birth: 25 November 1918
- Place of birth: Split, State of Slovenes, Croats and Serbs
- Date of death: 29 October 2007 (aged 88)
- Place of death: Split, Croatia
- Position: Striker

Senior career*
Years	Team	Apps	(Gls)
1935–1939	Hajduk Split	59	(42)
1939–1940	BSK	4	(2)
1940–1941	Hajduk Split		
1942–1943	Bologna	28	(13)
1946–1956	Hajduk Split	184	(105)
Total		275	(162)

International career
1938–1953	Yugoslavia	16	(6)

Managerial career
- 1956–1958: Hajduk Split
- 1959–1961: RNK Split
- 1961–1963: Tunisia
- 1963–1964: RNK Split
- 1965: Hajduk Split
Medal record
Men's Football
Representing Yugoslavia
Olympic Games
Silver medal – second place	1948 London	Team
- * Club domestic league appearances and goals

Frane Matošić (25 November 1918 – 29 October 2007) was a Croatian football player and coach who played as a striker. He is regarded as one of Hajduk Split's greatest players and he is the club's all-time leading goalscorer.

== Playing career ==
=== Club ===
Born in Split, Matošić started to play football with NK Hajduk. In his very first game for Hajduk in 1934 against Slavija from Sarajevo, Matošić scored two goals. He played 16 seasons for Hajduk. His older brother Jozo Matošić was also a football player with whom he was a teammate at Hajduk.

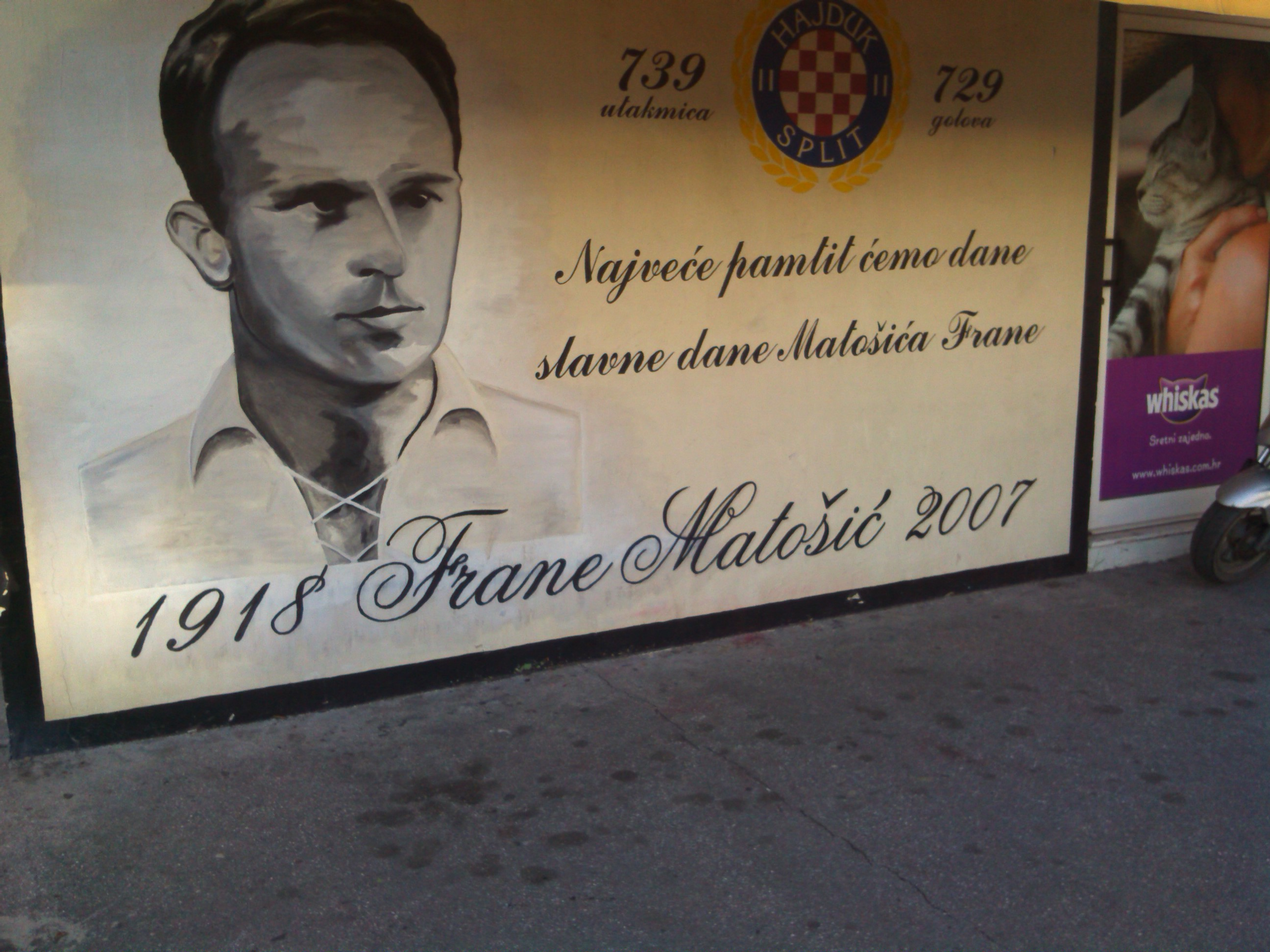
Frane Matošić mural in Split

While serving the obligatory military service in the 1939–40 season, he played for the BSK from Belgrade. Next season, he returned to Hajduk. After Hajduk's management suspending the work of Hajduk in 1941, he went abroad to play for Bologna, played in the 1942–43 season. When the information about restoring of Hajduk's work came to Matošić, he returned to Croatia and smuggled himself on the free territory. There he joined Hajduk, that restarted its work on the free, Allied-controlled part of Croatia, on the island of Vis. Since then, Matošić was playing the games for Hajduk (that was playing friendly games against Allied teams on the Mediterranean). After the war Matošić as a team captain twice refused Josip Broz Tito's offer of transferring Hajduk to Belgrade and renaming it into "Partizan". All together, Matošić played 739 games for Hajduk and scored impressive 729 goals.

=== International ===
Matošić was a long-time Yugoslavia national team player. He played 16 games and scored six goals for Yugoslavia. His last game was in 1953, and in that game he also scored a goal. He was also part of Yugoslavia's squad for the football tournament at the 1948 Summer Olympics, but he did not play in any matches. His final international was a May 1953 World Cup qualification match against Greece.

== Managerial career ==
After the ending of career as player, he turned to coaching career. He was the coach of Hajduk, few years after his brother Jozo was coaching it. He was also the coach of the Tunisia football team and of RNK Split.

== Death ==
Matošić died in Split on the anniversary of Hajduk's historical victory over Red Star Belgrade in 1950.

== Honours ==
=== Player ===
Hajduk Split

- Banovina of Croatia Championship: 1940–41
- Socialist Republic of Croatia Championship: 1945, 1946
- Yugoslav First League: 1950, 1952, 1955

Yugoslavia

- Olympic Silver Medal: 1948

Individual

- Socialist Republic of Croatia Championship top goalscorer: 1946
- Yugoslav First League Top Goal Scorer: 1948–49

=== Manager ===
RNK Split

- Yugoslav Second League (West): 1959–60

Tunisia

- Africa Cup of Nations: third place 1962

=== Records ===
- Hajduk Split all-time leading goalscorer: 211 goals
- Hajduk Split all-time Leading goalscorer: 729 goals (unofficial matches included)
- Hajduk Split all-time appearance maker: 739 games (unofficial matches included)
