= 1952 Yugoslav First League =

Prva savezna liga
- Season: 1952
- Champions: Hajduk Split (4th title)
- Relegated: Rabotnički; Mačva Šabac

The First Federal League of Yugoslavia's 1952 season (colloquially the Yugoslav First League) was shortened and sped-up. It was completed over a period of little more than three and a half months, beginning on 2 March 1952 and finishing on 22 June 1952. The reason for the changes was a desire to start the next season in the fall of 1952, thus implementing the fall-spring format that had become a norm all across Europe by this time.

The clubs were initially divided into two groups of six teams each, where everyone within a given group played each other twice (home and away).

Then, according to the placement in these preliminary groups, three new groups were formed:

- First two teams in each of the two preliminary groups advanced to the 4-team group, the winner of which would become a champion.
- Teams placed 3rd and 4th in each of the two preliminary groups got to move to a 4-team group that would decide final league standings from 5th to 8th place.
- The bottom two teams in each of the two preliminary groups moved to a 4-team group that would decide final league standings at the bottom (places 9th through 12th) and thus determine who gets relegated to the Second League.

== League ==
=== Preliminary stage ===
==== Group 1 ====
Pos	Team	Pld	W	D	L	GF	GA	GD	Pts	Qualification
1	Dinamo Zagreb	10	8	0	2	27	13	+14	16	Qualification for Championship group
2	Lokomotiva	10	7	0	3	20	9	+11	14	Qualification for Championship group
3	Partizan	10	6	0	4	24	15	+9	12	Qualification for Central group
4	Vojvodina	10	5	0	5	21	15	+6	10	Qualification for Central group
5	Rabotnički	10	2	1	7	9	30	−21	5	Qualification for Relegation group
6	Mačva Šabac	10	1	1	8	10	29	−19	3	Qualification for Relegation group

Source: rsssf.org

Home \ Away	DIN	LOK	MAČ	PAR	RAB	VOJ
Dinamo Zagreb		0–1	5–1	3–1	4–1	3–2
Lokomotiva	2–5		3–0	3–0	3–0	2–1
Mačva Šabac	2–3	1–0		0–1	1–1	1–5
Partizan	0–3	2–1	6–3		1–0	1–2
Rabotnički	3–0	0–4	2–1	0–8		0–3
Vojvodina	0–1	0–1	3–0	0–4	5–2	

Source: DataSoccer.it
Legend: Blue = home team win; Yellow = draw; Red = away team win.

==== Group 2 ====
Pos	Team	Pld	W	D	L	GF	GA	GD	Pts	Qualification
1	Red Star Belgrade	10	7	0	3	20	16	+4	14	Qualification for Championship group
2	Hajduk Split	10	6	0	4	23	11	+12	12	Qualification for Championship group
3	BSK Belgrade	10	4	2	4	19	12	+7	10	Qualification for Central group
4	Vardar	10	5	0	5	13	18	−5	10	Qualification for Central group
5	NK Zagreb	10	3	2	5	7	12	−5	8	Qualification for Relegation group
6	Sarajevo	10	3	0	7	8	21	−13	6	Qualification for Relegation group

Source: rsssf.org

Home \ Away	BSK	HAJ	RSB	SAR	VAR	ZAG
BSK Belgrade		0–1	4–2	3–0	6–0	0–0
Hajduk Split	2–3		6–0	4–0	2–1	2–1
Red Star	3–2	3–1		2–0	2–0	2–0
Sarajevo	2–1	2–0	1–2		0–1	1–0
Vardar	1–0	0–5	2–1	5–0		2–1
NK Zagreb	0–0	1–0	0–3	3–2	1–0	

Source: DataSoccer.it
Legend: Blue = home team win; Yellow = draw; Red = away team win.

=== Final round ===
==== Championship group ====
Pos	Team	Pld	W	D	L	GF	GA	GD	Pts
1	Hajduk Split (C)	6	4	1	1	12	4	+8	9
2	Red Star Belgrade	6	3	2	1	11	6	+5	8
3	Lokomotiva	6	2	0	4	12	19	−7	4
4	Dinamo Zagreb	6	0	3	3	8	14	−6	3

Source: rsssf.org
(C) Champions

Home \ Away	DIN	HAJ	LOK	RSB
Dinamo Zagreb		0–3	2–4	0–0
Hajduk Split	1–1		2–0	2–0
Lokomotiva	4–3	2–4		2–3
Red Star	2–2	1–0	5–0	

Source: DataSoccer.it
Legend: Blue = home team win; Yellow = draw; Red = away team win.

==== Central group ====
Pos	Team	Pld	W	D	L	GF	GA	GD	Pts
5	BSK Belgrade	6	5	1	0	15	6	+9	11
6	Partizan	6	3	1	2	17	11	+6	7
7	Vardar	6	2	1	3	8	15	−7	5
8	Vojvodina	6	0	1	5	7	15	−8	1

Source: rsssf.org

Home \ Away	BSK	PAR	VAR	VOJ
BSK Belgrade		3–2	5–1	2–1
Partizan	1–2		7–1	5–5
Vardar	1–1	0–1		3–1
Vojvodina	0–2	0–1	0–2	

Source: DataSoccer.it
Legend: Blue = home team win; Yellow = draw; Red = away team win.

==== Relegation group ====
Pos	Team	Pld	W	D	L	GF	GA	GD	Pts	Relegation
9	Sarajevo	6	3	2	1	8	3	+5	8	
10	NK Zagreb	6	2	3	1	6	6	0	7	
11	Rabotnički (R)	6	2	1	3	10	14	−4	5	Relegation to Yugoslav Second League
12	Mačva Šabac (R)	6	1	2	3	7	8	−1	4	Relegation to Yugoslav Second League

Source: rsssf.org
(R) Relegated

Home \ Away	MAČ	RAB	SAR	ZAG
Mačva Šabac		3–1	0–1	2–2
Rabotnički	3–2		1–1	3–1
Sarajevo	1–0	5–1		0–0
NK Zagreb	0–0	2–1	1–0	

Source: DataSoccer.it
Legend: Blue = home team win; Yellow = draw; Red = away team win.

== Top scorers ==
Rank	Player	Club	Goals
1	(Socialist Federal Republic of Yugoslavia) Stanoje Jocić	BSK Belgrade	13
2	(Socialist Federal Republic of Yugoslavia) Vladimir Firm	Lokomotiva	11
3	(Socialist Federal Republic of Yugoslavia) Drago Hmelina	Lokomotiva	10

== See also ==
- Yugoslav Cup
- Yugoslav League Championship
- Football Association of Yugoslavia
