= Bernard Vukas =

Croatian footballer (1927–1983)

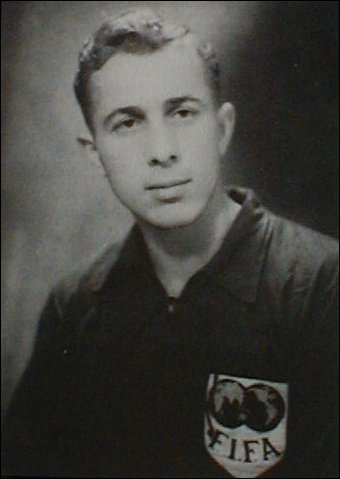

Personal information
- Full name: Bernard Vukas
- Date of birth: 1 May 1927
- Place of birth: Zagreb, Kingdom of Serbs, Croats and Slovenes
- Date of death: 4 April 1983 (aged 55)
- Place of death: Zagreb, SR Croatia, SFR Yugoslavia
- Height: 1.71 m (5 ft 7 1/2 in)
- Positions: Left winger; forward

Youth career
- 1938–1945: Concordia Zagreb

Senior career*
Years	Team	Apps	(Gls)
1945–1946	Amater Zagreb		
1946–1947	NK Zagreb		
1947–1957	Hajduk Split	202	(89)
1957–1959	Bologna	45	(2)
1959–1963	Hajduk Split	65	(5)
1962–1963	Austria Klagenfurt	21	(1)
1963–1965	Grazer AK	23	(1)
1965–1967	Kapfenberger SV	32	(3)
Total		388	(101)

International career
1948–1957	Yugoslavia	59	(22)
Medal record
Men's Football
Representing Yugoslavia
Olympic Games
Silver medal – second place	1948 London	Team
Silver medal – second place	1952 Helsinki	Team
- * Club domestic league appearances and goals

Bernard Vukas (1 May 1927 – 4 April 1983) was a Croatian footballer who played for Yugoslavia.

Vukas played as a left winger/forward and is mostly remembered for his extraordinary dribbling ability. In 2000, he was voted by the Croatian Football Federation as the best Croatian player of all time, and in another poll by Večernji List he was voted Best Croatian Athlete of the 20th Century.

== Club career ==
Vukas started his career in the youth ranks of Concordia Zagreb. After WW2, he spent some time in NK Amater Zagreb before moving to Hajduk Split in 1947. He stayed in Hajduk until 1957, playing 202 games and scoring 89 goals. With Hajduk, Vukas won the Yugoslav First League title on three occasions, in 1950, 1952 and 1955, and he was the league's top scorer in the 1954–55 season with 20 goals. In 1950, Vukas helped Hajduk win the Yugoslav First League undefeated, a record which has never been broken.

In 1957, he moved to Bologna FC 1909, where he stayed for two years playing 48 games and scoring two goals, but his time there was overshadowed by serious illness. He returned to Hajduk in 1959 and remained until 1963, playing 65 games and scoring 5 goals. He spent his last days as a football player in Austria, playing for Austria Klagenfurt, Grazer AK and Kapfenberger SV.

Counting friendlies, Vukas played a total of 615 games for Hajduk Split and scored 300 goals.

On 21 October 1953, Vukas, along with Branko Zebec, Vladimir Beara and Zlatko Čajkovski, played for FIFA's 'Rest of the World' team against England at Wembley – in a match to celebrate 90 years of English Football Association. The match ended 4–4, with Vukas assisting in two goals and being awarded a penalty. Two years later, on 13 August 1955, Vukas was invited to play for the UEFA Team in a friendly match against Great Britain played in Belfast, where Vukas scored a hat trick.

He died of a heart attack on 4 April 1983, aged 55. There are streets in Split and Zagreb named after him.

== International career ==
He made his debut for Yugoslavia in a June 1948 Balkan Cup match against Albania and earned a total of 59 caps, scoring 22 goals. He was also a part of the Yugoslavian team in the 1950 and 1954 FIFA World Cups. With Yugoslavia he won 2 silver medals in the Olympic games. His final international was a May 1957 Central European International Cup match against Czechoslovakia.

== International goals ==
No.	Date	Venue	Opponent	Score	Result	Competition
1.	28 May 1950	Belgrade, Yugoslavia	Denmark	1–0	5–1	Friendly
2.	7 September 1950	Helsinki, Finland	Finland	2–0	2–3	Friendly
3.	23 August 1951	Oslo, Norway	Norway	1–0	4–2	Friendly
4.	25 June 1952	Zagreb, Yugoslavia	Norway	1–0	4–1	Friendly
5.	25 June 1952	Zagreb, Yugoslavia	Norway	2–0	4–1	Friendly
6.	15 July 1952	Helsinki, Finland	India	1–0	10–1	1952 Summer Olympics
7.	15 July 1952	Helsinki, Finland	India	8–0	10–1	1952 Summer Olympics
8.	25 July 1952	Helsinki, Finland	Denmark	3–0	5–3	1952 Summer Olympics
9.	21 September 1952	Belgrade, Yugoslavia	Austria	3–0	4–2	Friendly
10.	2 November 1952	Belgrade, Yugoslavia	Egypt	3–0	5–0	Friendly
11.	6 January 1953	Cairo, Egypt	Egypt	1–0	3–1	Friendly
12.	6 January 1953	Cairo, Egypt	Egypt	3–1	3–1	Friendly
13.	14 May 1953	Brussels, Belgium	Belgium	1–0	3–1	Friendly
14.	14 May 1953	Brussels, Belgium	Belgium	3–0	3–1	Friendly
15.	21 May 1953	Belgrade, Yugoslavia	Wales	3–0	5–2	Friendly
16.	26 September 1954	Saarbrücken, West Germany	Saar	1–0	5–1	Friendly
17.	26 September 1954	Saarbrücken, West Germany	Saar	4–1	5–1	Friendly
18.	26 September 1954	Saarbrücken, West Germany	Saar	5–1	5–1	Friendly
19.	5 May 1955	Belgrade, Yugoslavia	Scotland	2–1	2–2	Friendly
20.	29 May 1955	Turin, Italy	Italy	4–0	4–0	1955–60 Central European International Cup
21.	29 April 1956	Budapest, Hungary	Hungary	1–0	2–2	1955–60 Central European International Cup
22.	12 May 1957	Zagreb, Yugoslavia	Italy	6–1	6–1	1955–60 Central European International Cup

== Honours ==
- In Hajduk, Vukas won Yugoslav league titles three times, 1950, 1952 and 1955, whereupon the championship of 1950 was achieved without a defeat. This record is still alive.
- Twice the Yugoslavia national team including Bernard Vukas won the silver medal at the Olympic Games (1948 and 1952).
- In the 1954–55 season, he led the Yugoslav league as the top goalscorer, with 20 goals.
- He played 615 games for Hajduk Split and scored 300 times.
- On 21 October 1953, he played in Wembley for the "Rest of the World" team against England. The final result was 4–4.
- On 13 August 1955, he was invited to play for the UEFA team (Continental Team) in Belfast against Great Britain. The game ended 4–1 with a hat trick by Vukas.
- He was also a part of the Yugoslavia team in the 1950 FIFA World Cup and 1954 FIFA World Cup.
- In 2000, he was elected for the best Croatian football player of all times.

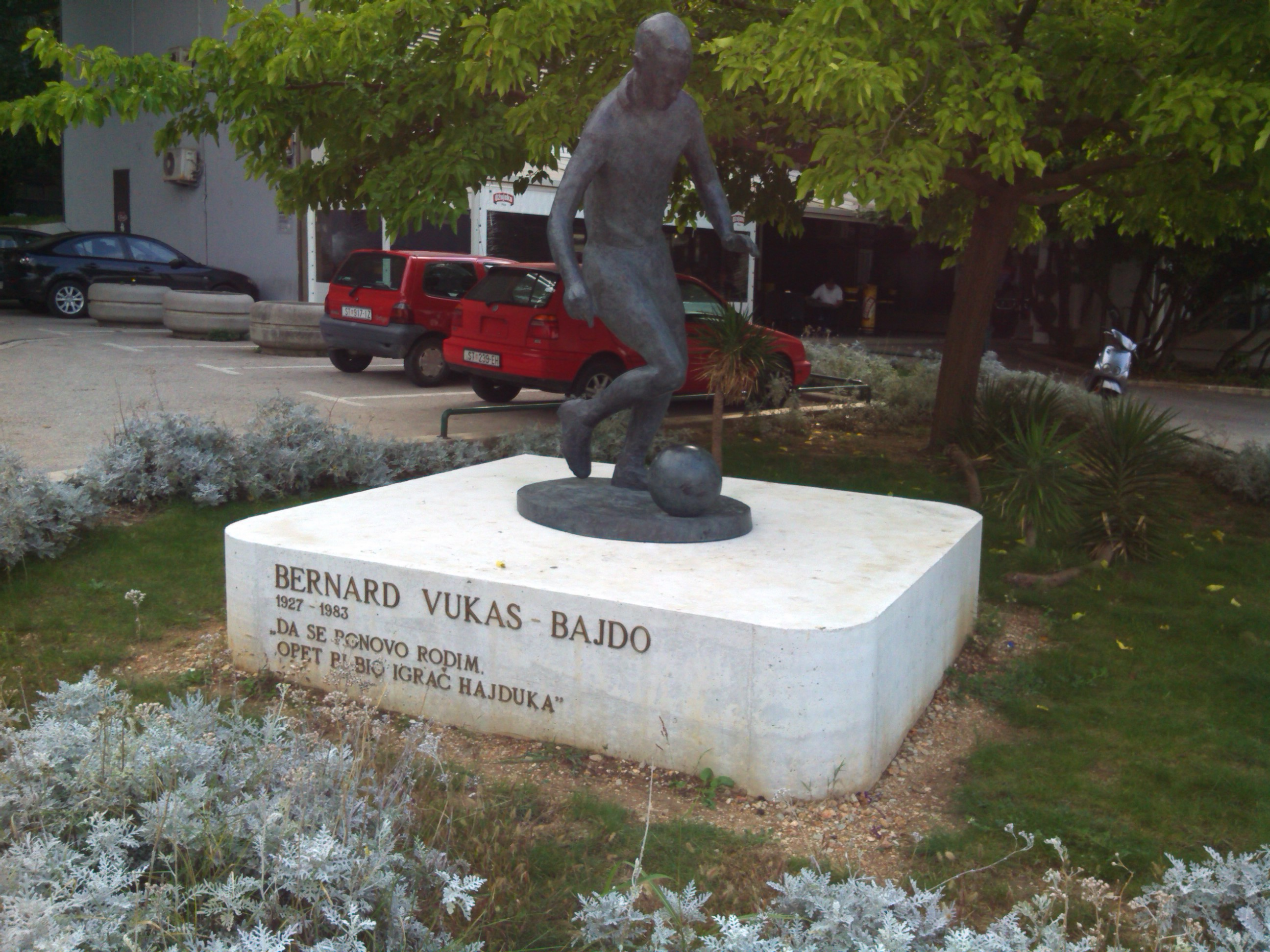
Statue of Vukas, in front of Poljud stadium, Split

Awards
Preceded by Žarko Dolinar	Yugoslav Sportsman of the Year; 1955	Succeeded by Franjo Mihalić
