= 1973–74 FK Partizan season =

Partizan
1973–74 season
- President: Vesa Živković
- Head coach: Velibor Vasović (until 29 November 1973); Mirko Damjanović
- Yugoslav First League: 4th
- Yugoslav Cup: Round of 16
- Top goalscorer: League: All: Nenad Bjeković

The 1973–74 season was the 28th season in FK Partizan's existence. This article shows player statistics and matches that the club played during the 1973–74 season.

== Players ==
Note: Flags indicate national team as defined under FIFA eligibility rules; some limited exceptions apply. Players may hold more than one non-FIFA nationality.

| No. | Pos. | Nation | Player |
|---|---|---|---|
| — | GK | YUG | Blagoj Istatov |
| — | GK | YUG | Zlatko Milić |
| — | DF | YUG | Radomir Antić |
| — | DF | YUG | Miroslav Bošković |
| — | DF | YUG | Nikola Budišić |
| — | DF | YUG | Svemir Đorđić |
| — | DF | YUG | Ivan Golac |
| — | DF | YUG | Refik Kozić |
| — | DF | YUG | Rešad Kunovac |
| — | DF | YUG | Blagoje Paunović |
| — | DF | YUG | Vlada Pejović |

| No. | Pos. | Nation | Player |
|---|---|---|---|
| — | MF | YUG | Zoran Cvetanović |
| — | MF | YUG | Borivoje Đorđević |
| — | MF | YUG | Vasil Ringov |
| — | MF | YUG | Aranđel Todorović |
| — | MF | YUG | Aleksandar Trifunović |
| — | MF | YUG | Ljubiša Tumbaković |
| — | MF | YUG | Momčilo Vukotić |
| — | FW | YUG | Nenad Bjeković |
| — | FW | YUG | Ilija Zavišić |
| — | FW | YUG | Miodrag Živaljević |

== Friendlies ==
| 22 August 1973 Friendly | Atlético Madrid (Spain) | 0–1 | (Socialist Federal Republic of Yugoslavia) Partizan | Madrid, Spain |
| | | | Bjeković 82' |

| 23 August 1973 Friendly | Milan (Italy) | 2–1 | (Socialist Federal Republic of Yugoslavia) Partizan | Madrid, Spain |
| | Bigon 9'; Chiarugi 24' | | Bjeković 69' |

| 14 February 1974 Friendly | Partizan (Socialist Federal Republic of Yugoslavia) | 4–0 | (Poland) Wisła Kraków | Belgrade |

| 22 May 1974 Friendly | Partizan (Socialist Federal Republic of Yugoslavia) | 2–2 | (West Germany) Eintracht Frankfurt | Zaragoza, Spain |
| | Živaljević 24'; Bošković 42' | | 46' (pen.); 70' |

| 23 May 1974 Friendly | Partizan (Socialist Federal Republic of Yugoslavia) | 1–2 | (Belgium) Racing White | Zaragoza, Spain |
| | Antić 80' (pen.) | | 40' (pen.); 65' |

== Competitions ==
=== Yugoslav First League ===
| Pos | Team | Pld | W | D | L | GF | GA | GD | Pts | Qualification or relegation |
|---|---|---|---|---|---|---|---|---|---|---|
| 2 | Velež | 34 | 19 | 7 | 8 | 54 | 34 | +20 | 45 | Qualification for UEFA Cup first round |
| 3 | Red Star Belgrade | 34 | 19 | 5 | 10 | 72 | 46 | +26 | 43 | Qualification for Cup Winners' Cup first round |
| 4 | Partizan | 34 | 12 | 13 | 9 | 41 | 33 | +8 | 37 | Qualification for UEFA Cup first round |
| 5 | OFK Belgrade | 34 | 13 | 9 | 12 | 35 | 32 | +3 | 35 | |
| 6 | Čelik | 34 | 12 | 11 | 11 | 30 | 28 | +2 | 35 | |

Source: rsssf.org
Rules for classification: 1) points; 2) goal difference; 3) number of goals scored.

==== Matches ====
| 19 August 1973 1 | Sarajevo | 0–0 | Partizan | Sarajevo |
| | | | | Attendance: 12,000 |

| 26 August 1973 2 | Partizan | 0–0 | Proleter Zrenjanin | Belgrade |
| | | | | Stadium: Stadion JNA; Attendance: 12,000 |

| 2 September 1973 3 | Velež | 1–1 | Partizan | Mostar |
| | | | Cvetković 36' | Attendance: 12,000 |

| 8 September 1973 4 | Crvena zvezda | 1–0 | Partizan | Belgrade |
| | Bogićević 49' | | | Stadium: Marakana; Attendance: 52,000 |

| 12 September 1973 5 | Partizan | 3–2 | Sloboda Tuzla | Belgrade |
| | Antić 18'; Cvetković 21'; Zavišić 62' | | | Stadium: Stadion JNA; Attendance: 6,000 |

| 16 September 1973 6 | Zagreb | 3–1 | Partizan | Zagreb |
| | | | Zavišić 62' | Attendance: 12,000 |

| 23 September 1973 7 | Partizan | 1–0 | Vardar | Belgrade |
| | Đorđić 36' | | | Stadium: Stadion JNA; Attendance: 12,000 |

| 30 September 1973 8 | Olimpija | 2–0 | Partizan | Ljubljana |
| | | | | Attendance: 5,000 |

| 7 October 1973 9 | Partizan | 1–1 | Hajduk Split | Belgrade |
| | Vukotić 56' | | | Stadium: Stadion JNA; Attendance: 15,000 |

| 28 October 1973 10 | Željezničar | 0–1 | Partizan | Sarajevo |
| | | | Bjeković 65' | Attendance: 5,000 |

| 31 October 1973 11 | Partizan | 3–0 | Borac Banja Luka | Belgrade |
| | Bjeković 5', 56'; Vukotić 7' | | | Stadium: Stadion JNA; Attendance: 6,000 |

| 4 November 1973 12 | OFK Beograd | 1–0 | Partizan | Belgrade |
| | | | | Attendance: 12,000 |

| 31 October 1973 13 | Partizan | 1–1 | Vojvodina | Belgrade |
| | Živaljević 77' | | | Stadium: Stadion JNA; Attendance: 8,000 |

| 18 November 1973 14 | Dinamo Zagreb | 1–0 | Partizan | Zagreb |
| | | | | Attendance: 10,000 |

| 25 November 1973 15 | Partizan | 2–3 | Bor | Belgrade |
| | Bošković 5'; Bjeković 10' | | Radović 27', 39'; Šaković 55' | Stadium: Stadion JNA; Attendance: 7,000 |

| 2 December 1973 16 | Radnički Niš | 1–1 | Partizan | Niš |
| | | | Cvetković 85' | Attendance: 7,000 |

| 8 December 1973 17 | Partizan | 2–0 | Čelik | Belgrade |
| | Đorđević 45'; Vukotić 81' | | | Stadium: Stadion JNA; Attendance: 2,500 |

| 24 February 1974 18 | Partizan | 4–0 | Sarajevo | Belgrade |
| | Bjeković 1', 19', 48', 74' | | | Stadium: Stadion JNA; Attendance: 10,000 |

| 2 March 1974 19 | Proleter Zrenjanin | 1–0 | Partizan | Zrenjanin |
| | | | | Attendance: 5,000 |

| 9 March 1974 20 | Partizan | 3–2 | Velež | Belgrade |
| | Cvetković 17'; Bjeković 45'; Bošković 75' | | | Stadium: Stadion JNA; Attendance: 12,000; Referee: Šuperina (Rijeka) |

| 17 March 1974 21 | Partizan | 2–1 | Crvena zvezda | Belgrade |
| | Cvetković 43'; Živaljević 74' | | Karasi 21' | Stadium: Stadion JNA; Attendance: 55,000 |

| 24 March 1974 22 | Sloboda Tuzla | 0–0 | Partizan | Tuzla |
| | | | | Attendance: 8,000 |

| 27 March 1974 23 | Partizan | 0–3 | Zagreb | Belgrade |
| | | | | Stadium: Stadion JNA; Attendance: 7,000 |

| 31 March 1974 24 | Vardar | 1–1 | Partizan | Skopje |
| | | | Živaljević 58' | Attendance: 20,000 |

| 3 April 1974 25 | Partizan | 0–0 | Olimpija | Belgrade |
| | | | | Stadium: Stadion JNA; Attendance: 8,000; Referee: Rauš (Varaždin) |

| 7 April 1974 26 | Hajduk Split | 1–2 | Partizan | Split |
| | | | Živaljević 70'; Bjeković 75' | Stadium: Stadion Stari plac Attendance: 18,000; Referee: Tauzes (Ljubljana) |

| 14 April 1974 27 | Partizan | 1–1 | Željezničar | Belgrade |
| | Bjeković 29' | | | Stadium: Stadion JNA; Attendance: 6,000 |

| 21 April 1974 28 | Borac Banja Luka | 1–1 | Partizan | Banja Luka |
| | | | Zavišić 45' | Stadium: Banja Luka City Stadium; Attendance: 16,000; Referee: Maksimović (Novi Sad) |

| 24 April 1974 29 | Partizan | 0–0 | OFK Beograd | Belgrade |
| | | | | Stadium: Stadion JNA; Attendance: 15,000; Referee: Milivoje Gugulović (Niš) |

| 28 April 1974 30 | Vojvodina | 0–2 | Partizan | Novi Sad |
| | | | Bjeković 14'; Vukotić 73' | Stadium: Karađorđe Stadium; Attendance: 18,000; Referee: Strmečki (Zagreb) |

| 1 May 1974 31 | Partizan | 2–2 | Dinamo Zagreb | Belgrade |
| | Vukotić 34'; Bošković 85' | | | Stadium: Stadion JNA; Attendance: 12,000; Referee: Nikolić (Sarajevo) |

| 5 May 1974 32 | Bor | 1–0 | Partizan | Bor |
| | | | | Stadium: Stadion kraj Pirita; Attendance: 6,000; Referee: Rauš (Varaždin) |

| 12 May 1974 33 | Partizan | 3–1 | Radnički Niš | Belgrade |
| | Zavišić 10'; Vukotić 41'; Bjeković 76' (pen.) | | | Stadium: Stadion JNA; Attendance: 8,000; Referee: Strmečki (Zagreb) |

| 14 May 1974 34 | Čelik | 1–3 | Partizan | Zenica |
| | | | Bošković 26'; Bjeković 30'; Vukotić 83' (pen.) | Stadium: Bilino Polje Stadium; Attendance: 12,000; Referee: Rauš (Varaždin) |

=== Yugoslav Cup ===
| 12 August 1973 Round of 32 | Sloboda Tuzla | 0–1 | Partizan | Tuzla |
| | | | Bjeković 75' | Attendance: 7,000 |

| 29 August 1973 Round of 16 | Partizan | 1–4 | Zagreb | Belgrade |
| | Bjeković 81' (pen.) | | | Stadium: Stadion JNA; Attendance: 8,000 |

== See also ==
- List of FK Partizan seasons
