= 1970–71 FK Partizan season =

Partizan
1970–71 season
- President: Mića Lovrić
- Head coach: Gojko Zec
- Yugoslav First League: 5th
- Yugoslav Cup: First round
- Inter-Cities Fairs Cup: First round

The 1970–71 season was the 25th season in FK Partizan's existence. This article shows player statistics and matches that the club played during the 1970–71 season.

== Competitions ==
=== Yugoslav First League ===
Pos	Team	Pld	W	D	L	GF	GA	GD	Pts	Qualification or relegation
3	Dinamo Zagreb	34	17	9	8	55	32	+23	43	Qualification for UEFA Cup first round
4	OFK Belgrade	34	15	8	11	54	44	+10	38	Qualification for UEFA Cup first round
5	Partizan	34	14	10	10	44	34	+10	38	
6	Red Star Belgrade	34	14	8	12	62	46	+16	36	Qualification for Cup Winners' Cup first round
7	Olimpija	34	13	10	11	47	35	+12	36	

Source: rsssf.org
Rules for classification: 1) points; 2) goal difference; 3) number of goals scored.

22 August 1970 1	Partizan	2–0	Olimpija	Belgrade
	Vukotić 12'; Petrović 65'			Stadium: Stadion JNA; Referee: Popov (Titov Veles)

26 August 1970 2	Čelik	0–2	Partizan	Zenica
			Vukotić 24'; Katić 46'	Stadium: Bilino Polje Stadium; Attendance: 10,000; Referee: Radić (Solin)

30 August 1970 3	Partizan	0–0	Sarajevo	Belgrade
				Stadium: Stadion JNA

6 September 1970 4	Maribor	0–0	Partizan	Maribor

13 September 1970 5	Partizan	4–0	Crvenka	Belgrade
	Đorđić 61'; Vukotić 85', 88', 90'			Stadium: Stadion JNA

20 September 1970 6	Radnički Niš	0–0	Partizan	Niš

24 September 1970 7	Partizan	2–0	Dinamo Zagreb	Belgrade
	Đorđić; Đorđević			Stadium: Stadion JNA; Attendance: 25,000

27 September 1970 8	OFK Beograd	0–2	Partizan	Belgrade
			Bjeković 41'; Đorđević 53'	Stadium: Omladinski Stadium; Attendance: 15,000; Referee: Kostovski (Skopje)

4 October 1970 9	Partizan	2–1	Sloboda Tuzla	Belgrade
	Vukotić; Petrović			Stadium: Stadion JNA

18 October 1970 10	Radnički Kragujevac	0–2	Partizan	Kragujevac
			Vukotić 20', 77'	Stadium: Čika Dača Stadium; Attendance: 15,000; Referee: Gugulović (Niš)

25 October 1970 11	Partizan	1–2	Željezničar	Belgrade
	Bjeković 27'			Stadium: Stadion JNA; Attendance: 15,000; Referee: Trpkovski (Skopje)

1 November 1970 12	Velež	1–0	Partizan	Mostar
				Stadium: Stadion pod Bijelim Brijegom; Attendance: 15,000; Referee: Selimović (Sarajevo)

8 November 1970 13	Partizan	3–1	Borac Banja Luka	Belgrade
	Đorđević 20', 48'; Bjeković 29'			Stadium: Stadion JNA; Attendance: 5,000; Referee: Gugulović (Niš)

15 November 1970 14	Crvena zvezda	1–2	Partizan	Belgrade
	Filipović 35'		Bjeković 25', 90'	Stadium: Marakana; Attendance: 80,000; Referee: Mladenović

22 November 1970 15	Partizan	1–1	Bor	Belgrade
	Živaljević 61'			Stadium: Stadion JNA; Attendance: 10,000; Referee: Radulović (Titograd)

29 November 1970 16	Hajduk Split	0–0	Partizan	Split
				Stadium: Stadion Stari plac Attendance: 30,000; Referee: Trpkovski (Skopje)

6 December 1970 17	Partizan	1–0	Vojvodina	Belgrade
	Bjeković 85'			Stadium: Stadion JNA; Attendance: 20,000; Referee: Radić (Solin)

7 March 1971 18	Olimpija	2–0	Partizan	Ljubljana
				Stadium: Bežigrad Stadium; Attendance: 7,000; Referee: Trpkovski (Skopje)

13 March 1971 19	Partizan	0–2	Čelik	Belgrade
				Stadium: Stadion JNA; Attendance: 10,000; Referee: Rauš (Varaždin)

20 March 1971 20	Sarajevo	0–0	Partizan	Sarajevo
				Stadium: City Stadium Koševo; Attendance: 30,000; Referee: Trpkovski (Skopje)

27 March 1971 21	Partizan	3–1	Maribor	Belgrade
	Antić 14'; Đorđević 57'; Petrović 90'			Stadium: Stadion JNA; Attendance: 10,000; Referee: Horvat (Zagreb)

11 April 1971 22	Crvenka	0–1	Partizan	Crvenka
			Radaković 41'	Stadium: Milorad Dzomba Stadium; Attendance: 12,000; Referee: Medić (Zagreb)

18 April 1971 23	Partizan	3–1	Radnički Niš	Belgrade
	Đorđević 16' (pen.); Đorđić 62'; Bjeković 86'			Stadium: Stadion JNA; Attendance: 12,000; Referee: Trpkovski (Skopje)

25 April 1971 24	Dinamo Zagreb	4–0	Partizan	Zagreb
				Stadium: Stadion Maksimir; Attendance: 50,000; Referee: Rauš (Varaždin)

2 May 1971 25	Partizan	0–0	OFK Beograd	Belgrade
				Stadium: Stadion JNA; Attendance: 15,000; Referee: Rauš (Varaždin)

15 May 1971 26	Sloboda Tuzla	1–1	Partizan	Tuzla
			Antić 44'	Stadium: Tušanj City Stadium; Attendance: 10,000; Referee: Radić

19 May 1971 27	Partizan	1–1	Radnički Kragujevac	Belgrade
	Vukotić 41'			Stadium: Stadion JNA; Attendance: 8,000; Referee: Dopuđa (Sarajevo)

23 May 1971 28	Željezničar	3–2	Partizan	Sarajevo
			Đorđić 26', 31'	Stadium: Koševo Stadium; Attendance: 20,000; Referee: Maksimović (Novi Sad)

30 May 1971 29	Partizan	3–0	Velež	Belgrade
	Vukotić 8'; Živaljević 23'; Antić 40'			Stadium: Stadion JNA; Attendance: 15,000; Referee: Kostovski (Skoplje)

2 June 1971 30	Borac Banja Luka	1–0	Partizan	Banja Luka
				Stadium: Banja Luka City Stadium; Attendance: 16,000; Referee: Maksimović (Novi Sad)

6 June 1971 31	Partizan	0–2	Crvena zvezda	Belgrade
			Karasi 13'; Džajić 70'	Stadium: Stadion JNA; Attendance: 50,000; Referee: Selimović

13 June 1971 32	Bor	2–0	Partizan	Bor
				Stadium: Stadion kraj Pirita; Attendance: 10,000

20 June 1971 33	Partizan	3–4	Hajduk Split	Belgrade
	Živaljević 24'; Vukotić 37'; Marić 47'		Nadoveza 50', 62'; Bošković 64'; Buljan 88'	Stadium: Stadion JNA; Attendance: 20,000; Referee: Radulović (Titograd)

27 June 1971 34	Vojvodina	3–3	Partizan	Novi Sad
			Antić 20'; Vukotić 23'; Bjeković 74'	Stadium: Stadion Karađorđe; Attendance: 5,000; Referee: Dopuđa (Sarajevo)

=== Yugoslav Cup ===
11 November 1970 First round	Napredak Kruševac	0–0	Partizan	Kruševac
				Attendance: 10,000

Napredak won on penalties.

== See also ==
- List of FK Partizan seasons
