= 1974–75 FK Partizan season =

Partizan
1974–75 season
- President: Predrag Gligorić
- Head coach: Mirko Damjanović (until 16 November 1974); Tomislav Kaloperović
- Yugoslav First League: 6th
- Yugoslav Cup: First round
- UEFA Cup: Third round
- Top goalscorer: League: Boško Đorđević (21); All: Boško Đorđević (21)
- Average home league attendance: 16,412

The 1974–75 season was the 29th season in FK Partizan's existence. This article shows player statistics and matches that the club played during the 1974–75 season.

== Players ==
=== Squad information ===
Note: Flags indicate national team as defined under FIFA eligibility rules; some limited exceptions apply. Players may hold more than one non-FIFA nationality.

No.	Pos.	Nation	Player
—	GK	YUG	Blagoj Istatov
—	GK	YUG	Zlatko Milić
—	DF	YUG	Radomir Antić
—	DF	YUG	Dragan Arsenović
—	DF	YUG	Miroslav Bošković
—	DF	YUG	Svemir Đorđić
—	DF	YUG	Ivan Golac
—	DF	YUG	Refik Kozić
—	DF	YUG	Rešad Kunovac
—	DF	YUG	Blagoje Paunović
—	DF	YUG	Vlada Pejović
—	DF	YUG	Nenad Stojković
—	DF	YUG	Predrag Tomić

No.	Pos.	Nation	Player
—	DF	YUG	Novica Vulić
—	MF	YUG	Zoran Cvetanović
—	MF	YUG	Borivoje Đorđević
—	MF	YUG	Aranđel Todorović
—	MF	YUG	Aleksandar Trifunović
—	MF	YUG	Ljubiša Tumbaković
—	MF	YUG	Zoran Vraneš
—	MF	YUG	Momčilo Vukotić
—	FW	YUG	Nenad Bjeković
—	FW	YUG	Boško Đorđević
—	FW	YUG	Pavle Grubješić
—	FW	YUG	Simo Nikolić
—	FW	YUG	Ilija Zavišić
—	FW	YUG	Miodrag Živaljević

== Friendlies ==
10 August 1974 Friendly	Partizan (Socialist Federal Republic of Yugoslavia)	1–0	(England) Arsenal	Belgrade
	Bjeković

3 December 1974 Friendly	Fortuna Düsseldorf (West Germany)	2–2	(Socialist Federal Republic of Yugoslavia) Partizan	Düsseldorf, West Germany

== Competitions ==
=== Yugoslav First League ===
Pos	Team	Pld	W	D	L	GF	GA	GD	Pts
4	Velež	34	15	9	10	62	35	+27	39
5	Dinamo Zagreb	34	11	16	7	38	31	+7	38
6	Partizan	34	13	10	11	55	49	+6	36
7	Sloboda Tuzla	34	12	12	10	41	45	−4	36
8	OFK Belgrade	34	11	10	13	40	40	0	32

Source: rsssf.org
Rules for classification: 1) points; 2) goal difference; 3) number of goals scored.

==== Matches ====
18 August 1974 1	Željezničar	4–1	Partizan	Sarajevo
			Živaljević 74'	Attendance: 8,000; Referee: Fresl (Zagreb)

24 August 1974 2	Partizan	2–0	Velež	Belgrade
	Golac 13'; Bjeković 79'			Stadium: Stadion JNA; Attendance: 8,000; Referee: Rauš (Zagreb)

28 August 1974 3	Radnički Niš	0–0	Partizan	Niš
				Stadium: Čair Stadium; Attendance: 22,000

1 September 1974 4	Bor	1–1	Partizan	Bor
	Šaran 57'		Bjeković 75'	Stadium: Stadion kraj Pirita; Attendance: 5,000; Referee: Maksimović (Novi Sad)

8 September 1974 5	Partizan	0–2	OFK Beograd	Belgrade
			Zec 33'; Turudija 82'	Stadium: Stadion JNA; Attendance: 16,000; Referee: Čajić (Beograd)

15 September 1974 6	Čelik Zenica	2–1	Partizan	Zenica
	Prodanović 24'; Gavran 45'		Grubješić 15'	Stadium: Bilino Polje Stadium; Attendance: 15,000; Referee: Fresl (Samobor)

22 September 1974 7	Partizan	2–3	Hajduk Split	Belgrade
	Vukotić 23', 50'		Jovanić 55'; Jerković 65'; Žungul 72'	Stadium: Stadion JNA; Attendance: 25,000; Referee: Maksimović (Novi Sad)

6 October 1974 8	Proleter Zrenjanin	1–2	Partizan	Zrenjanin
	Sučević 11'		Vukotić 27'; Kozić 50'	Stadium: Karađorđev Park Stadium; Attendance: 10,000; Referee: Mađovski (Prilep)

9 October 1974 9	Partizan	1–1	Sloboda Tuzla	Belgrade
	Borivoje Đorđević 60'		Mulahasanović 19'	Stadium: Stadion JNA; Attendance: 12,000

12 October 1974 10	Sarajevo	2–1	Partizan	Sarajevo
	Simić 21'; Sušić 77'		Borivoje Đorđević 36'	Stadium: City Stadium Koševo; Attendance: 4,000; Referee: Marjan Rauš (Varaždin)

19 October 1974 11	Partizan	3–0	Vardar	Belgrade
	Borivoje Đorđević 10'; Boško Đorđević 19'; Zavišić 85'			Stadium: Stadion JNA; Attendance: 10,000; Referee: Strmečki (Zagreb)

27 October 1974 12	Crvena zvezda	3–1	Partizan	Belgrade
	Savić 15'; Filipović 24'; Džajić 90'		Nikolić 76'	Stadium: Marakana; Attendance: 62,000; Referee: Milivoje Gugulović

2 November 1974 13	Partizan	2–0	Olimpija	Belgrade
	Boško Đorđević 23'; Nikolić 89'			Stadium: Stadion JNA; Attendance: 6,000; Referee: Nikolić (Sarajevo)

10 November 1974 14	Rijeka	1–0	Partizan	Belgrade
	Ražić 70'			Stadium: Stadion Kantrida; Attendance: 10,000; Referee: Manojlović (Tetovo)

17 November 1974 15	Partizan	2–2	Vojvodina	Belgrade
	Boško Đorđević 59'; Borivoje Đorđević 72'		Ivezić 49', 75'	Stadium: Stadion JNA; Attendance: 12,000; Referee: Fresl (Zagreb)

24 November 1974 16	Radnički Kragujevac	2–0	Partizan	Kragujevac
	Žabarac 10'; Pejović 77'			Stadium: Čika Dača Stadium; Attendance: 10,000; Referee: Rauš (Varaždin)

7 December 1974 17	Partizan	3–1	Dinamo Zagreb	Belgrade
	Borivoje Đorđević 2'; Boško Đorđević 45'; Vukotić 69'		Čerček 26'	Stadium: Stadion JNA; Attendance: 2,000; Referee: Manojlovski (Tetovo)

1 March 1975 18	Partizan	4–1	Željezničar	Belgrade
	Boško Đorđević 14', 20'; Vukotić 37', 73'		Katalinski 47'	Stadium: Stadion JNA; Attendance: 15,000; Referee: Strmečki (Zagreb)

9 March 1975 19	Velež Mostar	2–0	Partizan	Mostar
	Halilhodžić 10'; Primorac 21'			Stadium: Stadion pod Bijelim Brijegom; Attendance: 8,000; Referee: Nikić (Ljubljana)

15 March 1975 20	Partizan	1–1	Radnički Niš	Belgrade
	Boško Đorđević 33'		Stoiljković 56'	Stadium: Stadion JNA; Attendance: 12,000; Referee: Jusufbegović (Sarajevo)

23 March 1975 21	Partizan	2–0	Bor	Belgrade
	Vukotić 2'; Boško Đorđević 55'			Stadium: Stadion JNA; Attendance: 8,000; Referee: Manojlovski (Tetovo)

30 March 1975 22	OFK Beograd	1–1	Partizan	Belgrade
	Mitrović 81'		Borivoje Đorđević 21'	Stadium: Omladinski Stadium; Attendance: 12,000; Referee: Maksimović (Novi Sad)

5 April 1975 23	Partizan	2–0	Čelik Zenica	Belgrade
	Boško Đorđević 18' (pen.); Vukotić 69'			Stadium: Stadion JNA; Attendance: 6,000; Referee: Horvat (Zagreb)

20 April 1975 24	Hajduk Split	2–2	Partizan	Split
	Žungul 15', 28'		Vukotić 22'; Antić 60'	Stadium: Stadion Stari plac Attendance: 20,000; Referee: Ihtijarević (Sarajevo)

26 April 1975 25	Partizan	3–1	Proleter Zrenjanin	Belgrade
	Vukotić 15', 55'; Boško Đorđević 38' (pen.)		Dubljević 60'	Stadium: Stadion JNA; Attendance: 15,000; Referee: Tuna (Kosovska Mitrovica)

30 April 1975 26	Sloboda Tuzla	3–3	Partizan	Tuzla
			Boško Đorđević 52'; Zavišić 63', 73'	Attendance: 12,000

4 May 1975 27	Partizan	2–1	Sarajevo	Belgrade
	Vukotić 25'; Boško Đorđević 66' (pen.)		Šljivo 89'	Stadium: Stadion JNA; Attendance: 15,000; Referee: Ristić (Novi Sad)

11 May 1975 28	Vardar	2–4	Partizan	Skopje
	Sekulov 38'; Krstevski 81'		Vukotić 31'; Boško Đorđević 52', 58'; Grubješić 88'	Stadium: City Park Stadium; Attendance: 20,000; Referee: Tauzes (Ljubljana)

18 May 1975 29	Partizan	1–1	Crvena zvezda	Belgrade
	Boško Đorđević 86' (pen.)		Petrović 80'	Stadium: Stadion JNA; Attendance: 48,464

21 May 1975 30	Olimpija	2–1	Partizan	Ljubljana
	Lalović 25'; Popivoda 37'		Boško Đorđević 88'	Stadium: Bežigrad Stadium; Attendance: 12,000; Referee: Zrilić (Banja Luka)

25 May 1975 31	Partizan	1–0	Rijeka	Belgrade
	Boško Đorđević 27' (pen.)			Stadium: Marakana*; Attendance: 15,000; Referee: Nikolić (Sarajevo)

15 June 1975 32	Vojvodina	2–0	Partizan	Novi Sad
	Adžić 3'; Ivezić 33'			Stadium: Karađorđe Stadium; Attendance: 30,000; Referee: Manojlovski (Tetovo)

22 June 1975 33	Partizan	4–3	Radnički Kragujevac	Belgrade
	Boško Đorđević 24'; Grubješić 32', 80'; Vukotić 65'		Paunović 34'; Mićović 46', 69'	Stadium: Stadion JNA; Attendance: 8,000; Referee: Maćoski (Prilep)

29 June 1975 34	Dinamo Zagreb	2–2	Partizan	Zagreb
	Zajec 2'; Kranjčar 73'		Boško Đorđević 44' (pen.); Vraneš 55'	Stadium: Stadion Maksimir; Attendance: 30,000; Referee: Zrilić (Banja Luka)

=== Yugoslav Cup ===
14 August 1974 First round	Zagreb	2–0	Partizan	Zagreb

=== UEFA Cup ===
==== First round ====
18 September 1974 First round 1st leg	Górnik Zabrze (Poland)	2–2	(Socialist Federal Republic of Yugoslavia) Partizan	Zabrze, Poland
17:30	Kurzeja 57'; Kwasny 68'	Report	Zavišić 72'; Vukotić 86'	Stadium: Górnik Zabrze Stadium; Attendance: 18,744

2 October 1974 First round 2nd leg	Partizan (Socialist Federal Republic of Yugoslavia)	3–0 (5 – 2 agg.)	(Poland) Górnik Zabrze	Belgrade, Yugoslavia
17:00	Vukotić 21'; Borivoje Đorđević 79'; Todorović 89'	Report		Stadium: Partizan Stadium

==== Second round ====
23 October 1974 Second round 1st leg	Partizan (Socialist Federal Republic of Yugoslavia)	5–0	(Northern Ireland) Portadown	Belgrade, Yugoslavia
17:00	Kozić 24', 63'; Zavišić 35'; Nikolić 79'; Vukotić 89'	Report		Stadium: Partizan Stadium; Attendance: 15,000

6 November 1974 Second round 2nd leg	Portadown (Northern Ireland)	1–1 (1 – 6 agg.)	(Socialist Federal Republic of Yugoslavia) Partizan	Portadown, Northern Ireland
15:45	Malcolmson 28'	Report	Todorović 62'	Attendance: 1,908

==== Third round ====
27 November 1974 Third round 1st leg	Partizan (Socialist Federal Republic of Yugoslavia)	1–0	(West Germany) 1. FC Köln	Belgrade, Yugoslavia
17:00	Vukotić 81'	Report		Stadium: Partizan Stadium; Attendance: 16,000

11 December 1974 Third round 2nd leg	1. FC Köln (West Germany)	5–1 (5 – 2 agg.)	(Socialist Federal Republic of Yugoslavia) Partizan	Cologne, West Germany
20:00	Overath 48'; Löhr 64'; Müller 66'; Glowacz 71'; Flohe 85'	Report	Kozić 73'	Stadium: Müngersdorfer Stadion; Attendance: 18,000

== Statistics ==
=== Goalscorers ===
This includes all competitive matches.

Rank	Pos	Nat	Name	Yugoslav First League	Yugoslav Cup	UEFA Cup	Total
1	FW	(Socialist Federal Republic of Yugoslavia)	Boško Đorđević	21	0	0	21
2	MF	(Socialist Federal Republic of Yugoslavia)	Momčilo Vukotić	14	0	4	18
3	MF	(Socialist Federal Republic of Yugoslavia)	Borivoje Đorđević	4	0	1	5
3	FW	(Socialist Federal Republic of Yugoslavia)	Ilija Zavišić	3	0	2	5
5	FW	(Socialist Federal Republic of Yugoslavia)	Pavle Grubješić	4	0	0	4
5	DF	(Socialist Federal Republic of Yugoslavia)	Refik Kozić	1	0	3	4
7	FW	(Socialist Federal Republic of Yugoslavia)	Simo Nikolić	2	0	1	3
8	FW	(Socialist Federal Republic of Yugoslavia)	Nenad Bjeković	2	0	0	2
8	MF	(Socialist Federal Republic of Yugoslavia)	Aranđel Todorović	0	0	2	2
10	DF	(Socialist Federal Republic of Yugoslavia)	Zoran Vraneš	1	0	0	1
10	DF	(Socialist Federal Republic of Yugoslavia)	Radomir Antić	1	0	0	1
10	DF	(Socialist Federal Republic of Yugoslavia)	Ivan Golac	1	0	0	1
10	FW	(Socialist Federal Republic of Yugoslavia)	Miodrag Živaljević	1	0	0	1
TOTALS				55	0	13	68

=== Score overview ===
Win Draw Loss

Opposition	Home score	Away score	Aggregate
Hajduk Split	2–3	2–2	4–5
Vojvodina	2–2	0–2	2–4
Crvena zvezda	1–1	1–3	2–4
Velež	2–0	0–2	2–2
Dinamo Zagreb	3–1	2–2	5–3
Sloboda Tuzla	1–1	3–3	4–4
OFK Beograd	0–2	1–1	1–3
Željezničar	4–1	1–4	5–5
Radnički Niš	1–1	0–0	1–1
Čelik	2–0	1–2	3–2
Olimpija	2–0	1–2	3–2
Sarajevo	2–1	1–2	3–3
Rijeka	1–0	0–1	1–1
Radnički Kragujevac	4–3	0–2	4–5
Vardar	3–0	4–2	7–2
Bor	2–0	1–1	3–1
Proleter Zrenjanin	3–1	2–1	5–2

== See also ==
- List of FK Partizan seasons
