= 1970–71 NK Hajduk Split season =

Hajduk Split
1970–71 season
- Chairman: Tito Kirigin
- Manager: Slavko Luštica
- First League: 1st
- Yugoslav Cup: Second round
- Inter-Cities Fairs Cup: Second round
- Top goalscorer: League: Petar Nadoveza (20); All: Petar Nadoveza (22)

The 1970–71 season was the 60th season in Hajduk Split’s history and their 25th season in the Yugoslav First League. Their 7th place finish in the 1969–70 season meant it was their 25th successive season playing in the Yugoslav First League.

== Competitions ==
=== Overall ===
Competition	Started round	Final result	First match	Last Match
1970–71 Yugoslav First League	–	1st	23 August	27 June
1970–71 Yugoslav Cup	First round	Second round	2 December	28 February
1970–71 Inter-Cities Fairs Cup	First round	Second round	16 September	4 November

=== Yugoslav First League ===
==== Classification ====
Pos	Team	Pld	W	D	L	GF	GA	GD	Pts	Qualification or relegation
1	Hajduk Split (C)	34	18	13	3	61	31	+30	49	Qualification for European Cup first round
2	Željezničar	34	18	9	7	59	34	+25	45	Qualification for UEFA Cup first round
3	Dinamo Zagreb	34	17	9	8	55	32	+23	43	Qualification for UEFA Cup first round
4	OFK Belgrade	34	15	8	11	54	44	+10	38	Qualification for UEFA Cup first round
5	Partizan	34	14	10	10	44	34	+10	38	

Source: rsssf.org
Rules for classification: 1) points; 2) goal difference; 3) number of goals scored.
(C) Champions

== Matches ==
=== First League ===
Round	Date	Venue	Opponent	Score	Hajduk Scorers
1	23 Aug	H	Čelik	1 – 1	Jovanić
2	26 Aug	A	Sarajevo	1 – 1	Jovanić
3	30 Aug	H	Maribor	1 – 0	Jovanić
4	6 Sep	A	Crvenka	1 – 1	Hlevnjak
5	13 Sep	H	Radnički Niš	3 – 1	Jerković (2), Jovanić, Pavlica
6	20 Sep	A	Dinamo Zagreb	1 – 0	Jerković
7	23 Sep	H	OFK Beograd	2 – 2	Nadoveza, Vardić
8	27 Sep	A	Sloboda	1 – 1	Nadoveza
9	4 Oct	H	Radnički Kragujevac	5 – 0	Jerković (2), Nadoveza, Pavlica, Vardić
10	18 Oct	A	Željezničar	1 – 2	Vardić
11	25 Oct	H	Velež	3 – 0	Ferić, Hlevnjak, Jerković
12	1 Nov	A	Borac Banja Luka	2 – 1	Nadoveza (2)
13	8 Nov	H	Red Star	4 – 2	Jerković (2), Jovanić, Novković (o.g.)
14	15 Nov	A	Bor	0 – 0	
15	22 Nov	H	Vojvodina	2 – 1	Jovanić, Nadoveza
16	29 Nov	H	Partizan	0 – 0	
17	6 Dec	A	Olimpija	0 – 0	
18	7 Mar	A	Čelik	0 – 1	
19	14 Mar	H	Sarajevo	0 – 0	
20	21 Mar	A	Maribor	2 – 2	Hlevnjak, Nadoveza
21	28 Mar	H	Crvenka	2 – 1	Nadoveza, Pavlica
22	11 Apr	A	Radnički Niš	1 – 0	Jerković
23	18 Apr	H	Dinamo Zagreb	3 – 1	Pavlica (2), Lemešić
24	25 Apr	A	OFK Beograd	1 – 3	Hlevnjak
25	2 May	H	Sloboda	0 – 0	
26	16 May	A	Radnički Kragujevac	3 – 2	Nadoveza (2), Jerković
27	19 May	H	Željezničar	2 – 1	Hlevnjak, Pavlica
28	23 May	A	Velež	0 – 0	
29	30 May	H	Borac Banja Luka	5 – 1	Nadoveza (3), Jovanić, Pavlica
30	2 Jun	A	Red Star	1 – 1	Nadoveza
31	6 Jun	H	Bor	4 – 0	Jerković, Jovanić, Nadoveza, Žutelija
32	13 Jun	A	Vojvodina	3 – 1	Jerković (2), Pavlica
33	20 Jun	A	Partizan	4 – 3	Nadoveza (2), Bošković, Buljan
34	27 Jun	H	Olimpija	2 – 1	Hlevnjak, Nadoveza

Source: hajduk.hr

=== Yugoslav Cup ===
Round	Date	Venue	Opponent	Score	Hajduk Scorers
R1	2 Dec	A	RNK Split	2 – 1	Nadoveza, Smolčić
R2	28 Feb	A	Rijeka	2 – 3	Jerković, Zrilić

Sources: hajduk.hr

=== Inter-Cities Fairs Cup ===
Round	Date	Venue	Opponent	Score	Hajduk Scorers
R1	16 Sep	H	Slavia Sofia (Bulgaria)	3 – 0	Jerković, Jovanić, Pavlica
R1	30 Sep	A (Bulgaria)	Slavia Sofia (Bulgaria)	0 – 1	
R2	21 Oct	A (Portugal)	Vitória de Setúbal (Portugal)	0 – 2	
R2	4 Nov	H	Vitória de Setúbal (Portugal)	2 – 1	Hlevnjak, Nadoveza

Source: hajduk.hr

== Player seasonal records ==
=== Top scorers ===
Rank	Name	League	Europe	Cup	Total
1	(Socialist Federal Republic of Yugoslavia) Petar Nadoveza	20	1	1	22
2	(Socialist Federal Republic of Yugoslavia) Jurica Jerković	11	1	1	13
3	(Socialist Federal Republic of Yugoslavia) Mićun Jovanić	7	1	–	8
3	(Socialist Federal Republic of Yugoslavia) Ivan Pavlica	7	1	–	8
5	(Socialist Federal Republic of Yugoslavia) Ivan Hlevnjak	6	1	–	7
6	(Socialist Federal Republic of Yugoslavia) Miroslav Vardić	4	–	–	4
7	(Socialist Federal Republic of Yugoslavia) Miroslav Bošković	1	–	–	1
7	(Socialist Federal Republic of Yugoslavia) Ivan Buljan	1	–	–	1
7	(Socialist Federal Republic of Yugoslavia) Miroslav Ferić	1	–	–	1
7	(Socialist Federal Republic of Yugoslavia) Marino Lemešić	1	–	–	1
7	(Socialist Federal Republic of Yugoslavia) Vladimir Smolčić	–	–	1	1
7	(Socialist Federal Republic of Yugoslavia) Veselin Zrilić	–	–	1	1
7	(Socialist Federal Republic of Yugoslavia) Dinko Žutelija	1	–	–	1
	Own goals	1	–	–	1
	TOTALS	61	4	5	70

Source: Competitive matches

== See also ==
- 1970–71 Yugoslav First League
- 1970–71 Yugoslav Cup

== External sources ==
- 1970–71 Yugoslav First League at rsssf.com
- 1970–71 Yugoslav Cup at rsssf.com
- 1970–71 Inter-Cities Fairs Cup at rsssf.com
- 1970–71 Yugoslav First League at historical-lineups.com
