= 1968–69 NK Hajduk Split season =

Hajduk Split
1968–69 season
- Chairman: Josip Grubelić
- Manager: Dušan Nenković
- First League: 5th
- Yugoslav Cup: Runners-up
- Mitropa Cup: First round
- Top goalscorer: League: Petar Nadoveza (10); All: Petar Nadoveza, Ivan Pavlica (11)

The 1968–69 season was the 58th season in Hajduk Split’s history and their 23rd in the Yugoslav First League. Their 4th place finish in the 1967–68 season meant it was their 23rd successive season playing in the Yugoslav First League.

== Competitions ==
=== Overall ===
Competition	Started round	Final result	First match	Last Match
1968–69 Yugoslav First League	–	6th	18 August	6 July
1968–69 Yugoslav Cup	First round	Winners	29 November	19 June
1968–69 Mitropa Cup	First round		14 December	22 December

=== Yugoslav First League ===
==== Classification ====
Pos	Team	Pld	W	D	L	GF	GA	GD	Pts	Qualification or relegation
4	Vojvodina	34	15	9	10	42	44	−2	39	Invitation for Inter-Cities Fairs Cup first round
5	Željezničar	34	15	8	11	51	38	+13	38	
6	Hajduk Split	34	11	16	7	47	38	+9	38	
7	Radnički Niš	34	12	10	12	35	36	−1	34	
8	Velež	34	9	16	9	41	45	−4	34	

Source: rsssf.org
Rules for classification: 1) points; 2) goal difference; 3) number of goals scored.

== Matches ==
=== Yugoslav First League ===
Round	Date	Venue	Opponent	Score	Hajduk Scorers
1	18 Aug	H	OFK Beograd	2 – 0	Nadoveza, Pavlica
2	25 Aug	A	NK Zagreb	1 – 1	Ristić
3	1 Sep	H	Partizan	1 – 1	Nadoveza
4	8 Sep	H	Željezničar	2 – 4	Nadoveza, Ristić
5	15 Sep	H	Maribor	2 – 0	Nadoveza (2)
6	22 Sep	A	Rijeka	0 – 0	
7	29 Sep	H	Velež	1 – 1	Bošković
8	6 Oct	A	Čelik	3 – 3	Mušović, Hlevnjak, Ivković
9	9 Oct	H	Vardar	2 – 1	Vardić, Ivković
10	20 Oct	A	Dinamo Zagreb	2 – 2	Pavlica (2)
11	30 Oct	H	Red Star	1 – 1	Nadoveza
12	3 Nov	A	Sarajevo	0 – 0	
13	10 Nov	H	Radnički Niš	2 – 1	Pavlica, Bošković
14	17 Nov	A	Olimpija	1 – 2	Pavlica
15	24 Nov	H	Proleter Zrenjanin	1 – 1	Matijanić
16	1 Dec	A	Bor	1 – 1	Bošković
17	8 Dec	H	Vojvodina	0 – 0	
18	9 Mar	A	OFK Beograd	1 – 1	Vardić
19	16 Mar	H	NK Zagreb	3 – 2	Pavlica (3)
20	23 Mar	A	Partizan	1 – 2	Hlevnjak
21	30 Mar	H	Željezničar	2 – 1	Mušović, Vardić
22	6 Apr	A	Maribor	0 – 0	
23	13 Apr	H	Rijeka	3 – 0	Mušović (2), Nadoveza
24	20 Apr	A	Velež	1 – 2	Buljan
25	4 May	H	Čelik	1 – 0	Buljan
26	7 May	A	Vardar	0 – 1	
27	11 May	H	Dinamo Zagreb	2 – 1	Mušović, Ristić
28	18 May	A	Red Star	3 – 3	Hlevnjak (2), Mušović
29	25 May	H	Sarajevo	2 – 0	Buljan, Nadoveza
30	8 Jun	A	Radnički Niš	0 – 0	
31	15 Jun	H	Olimpija	1 – 2	Pavlica
32	22 Jun	A	Proleter Zrenjanin	1 – 1	Nadoveza
33	29 Jun	H	Bor	3 – 1	Vardić (2), Nadoveza
34	6 Jul	A	Vojvodina	1 – 2	Hlevnjak

Sources: hajduk.hr

=== Yugoslav Cup ===
Round	Date	Venue	Opponent	Score	Hajduk Scorers
R1	29 Nov	A	Karlovac	3 – 0	Bošković (2), Matijanić
R2	2 Mar	H	Sloboda	3 – 1	Vardić, Pavlica, Hlevnjak
QF	12 Mar	A	Bačka Bačka Palanka	2 – 1	Buljan, Bošković
SF	16 Apr	H	Red Star	1 – 0	Nadoveza
Final	31 May	N	Dinamo Zagreb	3 – 3 (a.e.t.)	Pavlica, Bošković, Vardić
Final (Replay)	19 Jun	N	Dinamo Zagreb	0 – 3	

Sources: hajduk.hr

=== Mitropa Cup ===
Round	Date	Venue	Opponent	Score	Hajduk Scorers
R1	14 Dec	A (Czechoslovakia)	Baník Ostrava (Czechoslovakia)	1 – 4	Bursać
R2	22 Dec	H	Baník Ostrava (Czechoslovakia)	2 – 1	Bursać (2)

Sources: hajduk.hr

== Player seasonal records ==
=== Top scorers ===
Rank	Name	League	Europe	Cup	Total
1	(Socialist Federal Republic of Yugoslavia) Petar Nadoveza	10	–	1	11
1	(Socialist Federal Republic of Yugoslavia) Ivan Pavlica	9	–	2	11
3	(Socialist Federal Republic of Yugoslavia) Miroslav Bošković	3	–	4	7
3	(Socialist Federal Republic of Yugoslavia) Miroslav Vardić	5	–	2	7
5	(Socialist Federal Republic of Yugoslavia) Džemaludin Mušović	6	–	–	6
5	(Socialist Federal Republic of Yugoslavia) Ivan Hlevnjak	5	–	1	6
7	(Socialist Federal Republic of Yugoslavia) Ivan Buljan	3	–	1	4
8	(Socialist Federal Republic of Yugoslavia) Boško Bursać	–	3	–	3
8	(Socialist Federal Republic of Yugoslavia) Aleksandar Ristić	3	–	–	3
10	(Socialist Federal Republic of Yugoslavia) Ante Ivković	2	–	–	2
10	(Socialist Federal Republic of Yugoslavia) Mladen Matijanić	1	–	1	2
	Own goals	–	–	1	1
	TOTALS	47	3	12	62

Source: Competitive matches

== See also ==
- 1968–69 Yugoslav First League
- 1968–69 Yugoslav Cup

== External sources ==
- 1968–69 Yugoslav First League at rsssf.com
- 1968–69 Yugoslav Cup at rsssf.com
- 1968–69 Mitropa Cup at rsssf.com
- 1968–69 Yugoslav First League at historical-lineups.com
