= 1972–73 FK Partizan season =

Partizan
1972–73 season
- President: Milosav Prelić
- Head coach: Velibor Vasović
- Yugoslav First League: 4th

The 1972–73 season was the 27th season in FK Partizan's existence. This article shows player statistics and matches that the club played during the season.

== Friendlies ==
15 July 1972 Friendly	Partizan (Socialist Federal Republic of Yugoslavia)	3–0	(Uruguay) Peñarol	Belgrade
	Vukotić 45'; Živaljević 50'; Cvetković 84'

30 July 1972 Friendly	Partizan (Socialist Federal Republic of Yugoslavia)	3–2	(France) Lyon	Belgrade
	Cvetković 7', 17'; Vukotić 13'

14 August 1972 Friendly	Málaga (Spain)	1–1	(Socialist Federal Republic of Yugoslavia) Partizan	Málaga, Spain
			Cvetković

15 August 1972 Friendly	Vasas (Hungary)	2–2	(Socialist Federal Republic of Yugoslavia) Partizan	Málaga, Spain
			Bjeković; Đorđić

15 October 1972 Friendly	Athletic Bilbao (Spain)	2–1	(Socialist Federal Republic of Yugoslavia) Partizan	Bilbao, Spain
	19'; 23'		Vukotić 53'

4 February 1973 Friendly	Partizan (Socialist Federal Republic of Yugoslavia)	3–1	(Poland) Wisła Kraków	Titograd

3 April 1973 Friendly	Olympiacos (Greece)	2–2	(Socialist Federal Republic of Yugoslavia) Partizan	Athens, Greece

== Competitions ==
=== Yugoslav First League ===
Pos	Team	Pld	W	D	L	GF	GA	GD	Pts	Qualification or relegation
2	Velež	34	17	12	5	48	27	+21	46	Qualification for UEFA Cup first round
3	OFK Belgrade	34	16	13	5	52	31	+21	45	Qualification for UEFA Cup first round
4	Partizan	34	16	11	7	50	37	+13	43	
5	Željezničar	34	18	6	10	59	41	+18	42	
6	Sloboda Tuzla	34	8	18	8	34	32	+2	34	

Source: rsssf.org
Rules for classification: 1) points; 2) goal difference; 3) number of goals scored.

==== Matches ====
20 August 1972 1	Sutjeska Nikšić	2–1	Partizan	Nikšić
			Bjeković 14'	Stadium: Gradski stadion Attendance: 6,000; Referee: Medić (Zagreb)

27 August 1972 2	Dinamo Zagreb	0–1	Partizan	Zagreb
			Bjeković 53'	Stadium: Stadion Maksimir; Attendance: 20,000; Referee: Popov (Titov Veles)

30 August 1972 3	Partizan	1–0	OFK Beograd	Belgrade
	Bjeković 20'			Stadium: JNA Stadium; Attendance: 25,000; Referee: Čanak (Beograd)

3 September 1972 4	Sarajevo	3–0	Partizan	Sarajevo
				Stadium: Koševo Stadium; Attendance: 15,000; Referee: Horvat (Zagreb)

9 September 1972 5	Partizan	2–1	Vardar	Belgrade
	Vukotić 55'; Cvetković 70'			Stadium: JNA Stadium; Attendance: 3,000; Referee: Ihtijarević (Sarajevo)

17 September 1972 6	Sloboda Tuzla	2–1	Partizan	Tuzla
			Kozić 80'	Stadium: Tušanj City Stadium; Attendance: 8,000; Referee: Radulović (Titograd)

24 September 1972 7	Partizan	2–1	Radnički Niš	Belgrade
	Bjeković 2' (pen.); Vukotić 29'			Stadium: JNA Stadium; Attendance: 5,000; Referee: Franković (Zagreb)

1 October 1972 8	Vojvodina	2–2	Partizan	Novi Sad
			Đorđić 70'; Bjeković 87' (pen.)	Stadium: Karađorđe Stadium; Attendance: 20,000; Referee: Horvat (Zagreb)

8 October 1972 9	Partizan	2–1	Hajduk Split	Belgrade
	Cvetković 54', 74'			Stadium: JNA Stadium; Attendance: 20,000; Referee: Gugulović (Niš)

22 October 1972 10	Crvena zvezda	2–0	Partizan	Belgrade

28 October 1972 11	Partizan	2–2	Velež	Belgrade
	Živaljević 65'; Katić 79'			Stadium: JNA Stadium; Attendance: 12,000; Referee: Strmečki (Zagreb)

1 November 1972 12	Željezničar	0–0	Partizan	Sarajevo
				Stadium: Koševo Stadium; Attendance: 12,000; Referee: Maksimović (Novi Sad)

4 November 1972 13	Partizan	3–1	Spartak Subotica	Belgrade
	Đorđić 21', 41'; Bjeković 34'			Stadium: JNA Stadium; Attendance: 7,000; Referee: Goce Popov (Titov Veles)

26 November 1972 14	Borac Banja Luka	0–0	Partizan	Banja Luka
				Stadium: Banja Luka City Stadium; Referee: Gugulović (Niš)

2 December 1972 15	Partizan	4–1	Čelik	Belgrade
	Golac 6'; Cvetković 40', 78'; Bjeković 48'			Stadium: JNA Stadium; Attendance: 4,000; Referee: Medić (Zagreb)

10 December 1972 16	Bor	1–1	Partizan	Bor
			Kozić 84'	Stadium: Stadion kraj Pirita; Attendance: 6,000; Referee: Ico Horvat (Zagreb)

17 December 1972 17	Partizan	2–0	Olimpija	Belgrade
	Cvetković 41'; Katić 52'			Stadium: JNA Stadium; Attendance: 6,000; Referee: Manojlovski (Tetovo)

4 March 1973 18	Partizan	3–1	Sutjeska Nikšić	Belgrade
	Vukotić 31' (pen.), 44', 57'			Stadium: JNA Stadium; Attendance: 5,000; Referee: Medić (Zagreb)

11 March 1973 19	Partizan	2–1	Dinamo Zagreb	Belgrade
	Vukotić 8', 12'			Stadium: JNA Stadium; Attendance: 12,000; Referee: Pavle Ristić (Novi Sad)

17 March 1973 20	OFK Beograd	1–0	Partizan	Belgrade
				Stadium: Omladinski Stadium; Attendance: 20,000; Referee: Mladenović (Beograd)

24 March 1973 21	Partizan	3–1	Sarajevo	Belgrade
	Vukotić 36'; Bjeković 47'; Katić 70'			Stadium: JNA Stadium; Attendance: 12,000; Referee: Tauzes (Ljubljana)

1 April 1973 22	Vardar	1–1	Partizan	Skopje
			Vukotić 34'	Stadium: City Stadium of Skopje; Attendance: 25,000; Referee: Marjan Rauš (Varaždin)

7 April 1973 23	Partizan	1–0	Sloboda Tuzla	Belgrade
	Vukotić 12'			Stadium: JNA Stadium; Attendance: 15,000; Referee: Medić (Zagreb)

15 April 1973 24	Radnički Niš	1–1	Partizan	Niš
			Đorđević 15'	Stadium: Čair Stadium; Attendance: 15,000; Referee: G. Popov (Titov Veles)

22 April 1973 25	Partizan	1–0	Vojvodina	Belgrade
	Bjeković 45'			Stadium: JNA Stadium; Attendance: 12,000; Referee: Strezo Trpkovski (Skoplje)

29 April 1973 26	Hajduk Split	3–2	Partizan	Split
			Kozić 74'; Vukotić 77'	Stadium: Stadion Stari plac Attendance: 12,000; Referee: Gugulović (Niš)

2 May 1973 27	Partizan	1–1	Crvena zvezda	Belgrade
	Radaković 75'		Janković 65'	Stadium: JNA Stadium; Attendance: 50,000

16 May 1973 28	Velež	0–3	Partizan	Mostar
			Đorđić; Bjeković; Vukotić

19 May 1973 29	Partizan	1–0	Željezničar	Belgrade
	Bjeković 49'			Stadium: JNA Stadium; Referee: Gugulović (Niš)

27 May 1973 30	Spartak Subotica	1–1	Partizan	Subotica
			Kozić 25'	Stadium: Subotica City Stadium; Attendance: 10,000; Referee: Tauzes (Ljubljana)

2 June 1973 31	Partizan	2–1	Borac Banja Luka	Belgrade

10 June 1973 32	Čelik	2–2	Partizan	Zenica

17 June 1973 33	Partizan	2–2	Bor	Belgrade

24 June 1973 34	Olimpija	2–0	Partizan	Ljubljana

== See also ==
- List of FK Partizan seasons
