= 1969–70 FK Partizan season =

Partizan
1969–70 season
- President: Mića Lovrić
- Head coach: Stjepan Bobek (until autumn 1969); Stevan Vilotić (until November 1969); Kiril Simonovski
- Yugoslav First League: Runners-up
- Yugoslav Cup: Round of 16
- Inter-Cities Fairs Cup: First round

The 1969–70 season was the 24th season in FK Partizan's existence. This article shows player statistics and matches that the club played during the 1969–70 season.

== Friendlies ==
25 December 1969 Friendly	Barcelona (Spain)	2–2	(Socialist Federal Republic of Yugoslavia) Partizan	Barcelona, Spain

15 January 1970 Friendly	Spartak Trnava (Czechoslovakia)	1–1	(Socialist Federal Republic of Yugoslavia) Partizan	Mexico City, Mexico
	84'		Vukotić 57'	Stadium: Estadio Azteca; Attendance: 30,000

20 January 1970 Friendly	Guadalajara (Mexico)	1–2	(Socialist Federal Republic of Yugoslavia) Partizan	Mexico City, Mexico
	?'		Bjeković 33'; Vukotić 40'	Stadium: Estadio Azteca; Attendance: 50,000

29 January 1970 Friendly	Mexico	1–1	(Socialist Federal Republic of Yugoslavia) Partizan	Mexico City, Mexico
	?'		84' (o.g.)	Stadium: Estadio Azteca; Attendance: 65,000

1 February 1970 Friendly	Botafogo (Brazil)	0–1	(Socialist Federal Republic of Yugoslavia) Partizan	Mexico City, Mexico
	(red card) 80'; (red card) 88'		Mihajlović (red card) 55'; Katić 70'	Stadium: Estadio Azteca; Attendance: 90,000

5 February 1970 Friendly	Torreón XI (Mexico)	0–2	(Socialist Federal Republic of Yugoslavia) Partizan	Mexico City, Mexico
			Petrović; Hošić

13 May 1970 Friendly	Bulgaria	4–0	(Socialist Federal Republic of Yugoslavia) Partizan	Sofia, Bulgaria

21 May 1970 Friendly	Partizan (Socialist Federal Republic of Yugoslavia)	3–3	(Brazil) São Paulo	Belgrade
				Stadium: Stadion JNA

== Competitions ==
=== Yugoslav First League ===
Pos	Team	Pld	W	D	L	GF	GA	GD	Pts	Qualification or relegation
1	Red Star Belgrade (C)	34	20	6	8	67	37	+30	46	Qualification for European Cup first round
2	Partizan	34	16	12	6	47	27	+20	44	Invitation for Inter-Cities Fairs Cup first round
3	Velež	34	17	9	8	64	44	+20	43	
4	Željezničar	34	17	9	8	52	33	+19	43	Invitation for Inter-Cities Fairs Cup first round
5	OFK Belgrade	34	13	12	9	53	32	+21	38	

Source: rsssf.org
Rules for classification: 1) points; 2) goal difference; 3) number of goals scored.
(C) Champions

24 August 1969 1	Partizan	2–0	Olimpija	Belgrade
				Stadium: Stadion JNA

31 August 1969 2	Vojvodina	1–2	Partizan	Novi Sad

6 September 1969 3	Partizan	1–4	Radnički Kragujevac	Belgrade
				Stadium: Stadion JNA

14 September 1969 4	Sloboda Tuzla	0–0	Partizan	Tuzla

21 September 1969 5	Partizan	2–0	Hajduk Split	Belgrade
	Đorđić 55'; Vukotić 80'			Stadium: Stadion JNA

28 September 1969 6	Partizan	1–0	Radnički Niš	Belgrade
				Stadium: Stadion JNA

5 October 1969 7	Dinamo Zagreb	2–0	Partizan	Zagreb

8 October 1969 8	Partizan	0–2	Željezničar	Belgrade
				Stadium: Stadion JNA

12 October 1969 9	Vardar	1–2	Partizan	Skopje

26 October 1969 10	Partizan	1–2	Velež	Belgrade
				Stadium: Stadion JNA

2 November 1969 11	Bor	0–0	Partizan	Bor

9 November 1969 12	Partizan	1–1	OFK Beograd	Belgrade
	Bjeković 66'			Stadium: Stadion JNA; Attendance: 12,000; Referee: Đurđević (Beograd)

16 November 1969 13	Čelik	1–3	Partizan	Zenica
			Hošić 20'; Vukotić; Katić	Stadium: Bilino Polje; Attendance: 8,000; Referee: kovačević (Niš)

23 November 1969 14	Partizan	1–3	Crvena zvezda	Belgrade
	Hošić 46'		Jevtić 16'; Aćimović 61'; Džajić 86'	Stadium: Stadion JNA; Attendance: 55,000

30 November 1969 15	Maribor	0–0	Partizan	Maribor

7 December 1969 16	Partizan	2–0	Zagreb	Belgrade
	Vukotić; Hošić			Stadium: Stadion JNA

14 December 1969 17	Sarajevo	0–0	Partizan	Sarajevo

8 March 1970 18	Olimpija	0–0	Partizan	Ljubljana

16 March 1970 19	Partizan	1–0	Vojvodina	Belgrade
	Hošić 68'			Stadium: Stadion JNA; Attendance: 8,000; Referee: Gugulović (Niš)

22 March 1970 20	Radnički Kragujevac	1–1	Partizan	Kragujevac
			Katić 5'	Stadium: Čika Dača Stadium; Attendance: 25,000; Referee: Dopuđa (Sarajevo)

29 March 1970 21	Partizan	0–0	Sloboda Tuzla	Belgrade
				Stadium: Stadion JNA

5 April 1970 22	Hajduk Split	1–1	Partizan	Split
			Živaljević 83'	Stadium: Stadion Stari plac Attendance: 18,000; Referee: Gugić (Niš)

19 April 1970 23	Radnički Niš	0–1	Partizan	Niš
			Katić 31'	Stadium: Čair Stadium; Attendance: 20,000; Referee: Strmečki (Zagreb)

26 April 1970 24	Partizan	0–0	Dinamo Zagreb	Belgrade
				Stadium: Stadion JNA

29 April 1970 25	Željezničar	2–2	Partizan	Sarajevo

3 May 1970 26	Partizan	1–0	Vardar	Belgrade
	Katić 71'			Stadium: Stadion JNA; Attendance: 5,000; Referee: Dopuđa (Sarajevo)

10 May 1970 27	Velež	3–0	Partizan	Mostar

17 May 1970 28	Partizan	3–1	Bor	Belgrade
	Bjeković 6', 27', 87'			Stadium: Stadion JNA; Attendance: 3,000; Referee: Marković (Veliki Crljeni)

24 May 1970 29	OFK Beograd	0–1	Partizan	Belgrade
			Katić 55'	Stadium: Omladinski Stadium; Attendance: 8,000; Referee: Gugić (Niš)

31 May 1970 30	Partizan	2–0	Čelik	Belgrade
	Bjeković 24'; Hošić 27'			Stadium: Stadion JNA; Attendance: 2,000; Referee: Strmečki (Zagreb)

7 June 1970 31	Crvena zvezda	1–1	Partizan	Belgrade
	Đorić 69'		Mihajlović 87'	Stadium: Marakana

14 June 1970 32	Partizan	7–1	Maribor	Belgrade
	Katić 22'; Đorđević 37', 57'; Đorđić 49', 56'; Živaljević 71'; Radaković 80'			Stadium: Stadion JNA; Attendance: 5,000; Referee: Radić (Solin)

21 June 1970 33	Zagreb	0–5	Partizan	Zagreb
			Katić 18', 75'; Vukotić 80'; Bjeković 84'; Đorđević 89'	Stadium: Stadion u Kranjčevićevoj; Attendance: 1,500; Referee: Maksimović (Novi Sad)

28 June 1970 34	Partizan	3–0	Sarajevo	Belgrade
	Katić 31', 41'; Đorđević 69'			Stadium: Stadion JNA; Attendance: 10,000; Referee: Zaninović (Zadar)

=== Yugoslav Cup ===
28 November 1969 Round of 32	Garnizon Kraljevo	2–3	Partizan	Kraljevo
			Bjeković 14'; Hošić 75'; Đorđić 85'	Attendance: 10,000

1 March 1970 Round of 16	Proleter Zrenjanin	0–0 (4–3 p)	Partizan	Zrenjanin
				Attendance: 14,000

=== Inter-Cities Fairs Cup ===
==== First round ====
18 September 1969 First round 1st leg	Partizan (Socialist Federal Republic of Yugoslavia)	2–1	(Hungary) Újpest Dózsa	Belgrade, Yugoslavia
	Đorđević 50', 54'		Dunai 80'	Stadium: Partizan Stadium; Attendance: 25,000

October 1969 First round 2nd leg	Újpest Dózsa (Hungary)	2–0 (3 – 2 agg.)	(Socialist Federal Republic of Yugoslavia) Partizan	Budapest, Hungary
	Bene 61'; Dunai 66'			Attendance: 25,000

== See also ==
- List of FK Partizan seasons
