= 1971–72 FK Partizan season =

Partizan
1971–72 season
- President: Milosav Prelić
- Head coach: Gojko Zec (until 23 December 1971); Velibor Vasović
- Yugoslav First League: 4th
- Yugoslav Cup: Round of 32

The 1971–72 season was the 26th season in FK Partizan's existence. This article shows player statistics and matches that the club played during the 1971–72 season.

== Competitions ==
=== Yugoslav First League ===
Pos	Team	Pld	W	D	L	GF	GA	GD	Pts	Qualification or relegation
3	OFK Belgrade	34	17	11	6	56	26	+30	45	Qualification for UEFA Cup first round
4	Vojvodina	34	15	12	7	50	38	+12	42	Qualification for UEFA Cup first round
5	Partizan	34	15	9	10	41	35	+6	39	
6	Velež	34	14	10	10	58	32	+26	38	
7	Sloboda Tuzla	34	12	11	11	34	33	+1	35	

Source: rsssf.org
Rules for classification: 1) points; 2) goal difference; 3) number of goals scored.

==== Matches ====
22 August 1971 1	Partizan	2–1	Borac Banja Luka	Belgrade
	Grubješić 12'; Živaljević 15' (pen.)			Stadium: JNA Stadium; Attendance: 15,000; Referee: Selimović (Sarajevo)

28 August 1971 2	Partizan	3–0	Radnički Kragujevac	Belgrade
	Bjeković 8'; Đorđić 51'; Milić 70' (o.g.)			Stadium: JNA Stadium; Attendance: 11,000; Referee: Horvat (Zagreb)

5 September 1971 3	Maribor	1–1	Partizan	Maribor
			Bjeković 5'	Stadium: Ljudski vrt Attendance: 7,000; Referee: Franković (Zagreb)

11 September 1971 4	Partizan	3–0	Sloboda Tuzla	Belgrade
	Živaljević 38'; Smileski 62'; Vukotić 74'			Stadium: JNA Stadium; Attendance: 10,000; Referee: Selimović (Sarajevo)

19 September 1971 5	Radnički Niš	0–1	Partizan	Niš
			Bjeković 3'	Stadium: Čair Stadium; Attendance: 15,000; Referee: Trpkovski (Skopje)

26 September 1971 6	Partizan	2–1	Čelik	Belgrade
	Živaljević 17' (pen.), 35' (pen.)			Stadium: JNA Stadium; Attendance: 10,000; Referee: Radić (Solin)

3 October 1971 7	Hajduk Split	2–1	Partizan	Split
			Vukotić 30'	Stadium: Stadion Stari plac Attendance: 12,000; Referee: Horvat (Zagreb)

6 October 1971 8	Partizan	0–0	Sarajevo	Belgrade
				Stadium: JNA Stadium; Attendance: 15,000; Referee: Strmečki (Zagreb)

10 October 1971 9	Dinamo Zagreb	2–0	Partizan	Zagreb
				Stadium: Stadion Maksimir; Attendance: 20,000; Referee: Kurir (Split)

24 October 1971 10	Partizan	0–1	Crvena zvezda	Belgrade
				Stadium: Marakana; Attendance: 53,000; Referee: Slišković (Mostar)

31 October 1971 11	Vardar	0–1	Partizan	Skopje
			Đorđić 5'	Stadium: City Stadium of Skopje; Attendance: 25,000; Referee: Rauš (Varaždin)

24 October 1971 12	Partizan	1–2	OFK Beograd	Belgrade
	Bjeković 23'			Stadium: JNA Stadium; Attendance: 15,000; Referee: Travlejev (Beograd)

14 November 1971 13	Sutjeska Nikšić	2–1	Partizan	Nikšić
			Đorđić 45'	Stadium: Gradski stadion Attendance: 11,000; Referee: Medić (Zagreb)

21 November 1971 14	Partizan	1–1	Velež	Belgrade
	Živaljević 40' (pen.)			Stadium: JNA Stadium; Attendance: 6,000; Referee: Selimović (Sarajevo)

28 November 1971 15	Olimpija	3–1	Partizan	Ljubljana
			Antić 75'	Stadium: Bežigrad Stadium; Attendance: 4,000; Referee: Strmečki (Zagreb)

5 December 1971 16	Partizan	0–1	Vojvodina	Belgrade
				Stadium: JNA Stadium; Attendance: 8,000; Referee: Gugulović (Niš)

12 December 1971 17	Željezničar	2–0	Partizan	Sarajevo
				Stadium: Koševo City Stadium; Attendance: 12,000; Referee: Radunović (Titograd)

27 February 1972 18	Borac Banja Luka	0–1	Partizan	Banja Luka
			Bjeković 22'	Stadium: Banja Luka City Stadium; Attendance: 15,000; Referee: Gugulović (Niš)

6 March 1972 19	Radnički Kragujevac	1–2	Partizan	Kragujevac
			Katić 20'; Cvetanović 61'	Stadium: Čika Dača Stadium; Attendance: 15,000; Referee: Rauš (Varaždin)

11 March 1972 20	Partizan	3–1	Maribor	Belgrade
	Katić 19'; Vukotić 39'; Živaljević 79'			Stadium: JNA Stadium; Attendance: 11,000; Referee: Maksimović (Novi Sad)

19 March 1972 21	Sloboda Tuzla	1–0	Partizan	Tuzla
				Stadium: Tušanj City Stadium; Attendance: 10,000; Referee: Kurir (Split)

16 April 1972 22	Sarajevo	0–1	Partizan	Sarajevo
			Bjeković 72'	Stadium: Koševo City Stadium; Attendance: 7,000; Referee: Strmečki (Zagreb)

19 April 1972 23	Čelik	0–0	Partizan	Zenica
				Stadium: Bilino Polje; Attendance: 8,000; Referee: Rauš (Varaždin)

24 April 1972 24	Partizan	2–1	Dinamo Zagreb	Belgrade
	Katić 12'; Đorđić 53'			Stadium: JNA Stadium; Attendance: 14,000; Referee: Dopuđa (Sarajevo)

2 May 1972 25	Partizan	1–1	Hajduk Split	Belgrade
	Bjeković 44'			Stadium: JNA Stadium; Attendance: 10,000; Referee: Ibrahimpašić (Sarajevo)

7 May 1972 26	Crvena zvezda	1–1	Partizan	Belgrade
			Bogićević 20' (o.g.)	Stadium: Marakana; Attendance: 45,000; Referee: Gugulović (Niš)

10 May 1972 27	Partizan	1–1	Radnički Niš	Belgrade
	Bjeković 59'			Stadium: JNA Stadium; Attendance: 6,000

17 May 1972 28	Partizan	2–1	Vardar	Belgrade
	Bjeković 82', 87'			Stadium: JNA Stadium; Attendance: 32,000; Referee: Horvat (Zagreb)

21 May 1972 29	OFK Beograd	0–0	Partizan	Belgrade
				Stadium: Omladinski Stadium; Attendance: 11,000; Referee: Trpkovski (Skopje)

28 May 1972 30	Partizan	3–1	Sutjeska Nikšić	Belgrade
	Bjeković 34', 43'; Radaković 55'			Stadium: JNA Stadium; Attendance: 2,000; Referee: Trpkovski (Skopje)

31 May 1972 31	Velež	1–1	Partizan	Mostar
			Bjeković 25'	Stadium: Stadion pod Bijelim Brijegom; Attendance: 6,000; Referee: Tauzes (Ljubljana)

4 June 1972 32	Partizan	1–0	Olimpija	Belgrade
	Živaljević 88'			Stadium: JNA Stadium; Attendance: 5,000; Referee: Horvat (Zagreb)

7 June 1972 33	Vojvodina	2–4	Partizan	Novi Sad
			Đorđić 37'; Živaljević 59', 88'; Bjeković 80'	Stadium: Karađorđe Stadium; Attendance: 15,000; Referee: Horvat (Zagreb)

11 June 1972 34	Partizan	0–4	Željezničar	Belgrade
				Stadium: JNA Stadium; Attendance: 28,000; Referee: Gugulović (Niš)

=== Yugoslav Cup ===
11 November 1971 First round	Partizan	2–0	Radnički Pirot	Belgrade
	Bjeković 55'; Grubješić 69'			Stadium: JNA Stadium; Attendance: 2,000

24 November 1971 Round of 32	Partizan	1–1	Borac Čačak	Belgrade
	Paunović 26'			Stadium: JNA Stadium

Borac won on penalties.

== See also ==
- List of FK Partizan seasons
