= 1967–68 FK Partizan season =

Partizan
1967–68 season
- President: Vladimir Dujić
- Head coach: Stevan Vilotić (until autumn 1967); Stjepan Bobek
- Yugoslav First League: Runners-up
- Yugoslav Cup: Round of 16
- Inter-Cities Fairs Cup: Second round

The 1967–68 season was the 22nd season in FK Partizan's existence. This article shows player statistics and matches that the club played during the 1967–68 season.

== Players ==
=== Squad information ===
Note: Flags indicate national team as defined under FIFA eligibility rules; some limited exceptions apply. Players may hold more than one non-FIFA nationality.

No.	Pos.	Nation	Player
—	GK	YUG	Ivan Ćurković
—	GK	YUG	Vojislav Marković
—	DF	YUG	Nikola Budišić
—	DF	YUG	Milan Damjanović
—	DF	YUG	Blagoje Paunović
—	DF	YUG	Ljubomir Mihajlović
—	DF	YUG	Vlada Pejović
—	DF	YUG	Miloš Radaković
—	DF	YUG	Branko Rašović
—	MF	YUG	Mane Bajić
—	MF	YUG	Borivoje Đorđević

No.	Pos.	Nation	Player
—	MF	YUG	Milan Petrović
—	MF	YUG	Miodrag Petrović
—	MF	YUG	Ljuan Prekazi
—	MF	YUG	Josip Pirmajer
—	MF	YUG	Vladica Kovačević
—	FW	YUG	Ivica Pogarčić
—	FW	YUG	Miloš Vidović
—	FW	YUG	Mustafa Hasanagić
—	FW	YUG	Predrag Burčul
—	FW	YUG	Idriz Hošić

== Friendlies ==
10 August 1967 Friendly	Marseille (France)	1–4	(Socialist Federal Republic of Yugoslavia) Partizan	Marseille, France

12 August 1967 Friendly	Morocco	4–1	(Socialist Federal Republic of Yugoslavia) Partizan	Casablanca, Morocco

16 August 1967 Friendly	Saint-Étienne (France)	1–0	(Socialist Federal Republic of Yugoslavia) Partizan	Vichy, France

23 August 1967 Friendly	Anderlecht (Belgium)	2–1	(Socialist Federal Republic of Yugoslavia) Partizan	Brussels, Belgium
				Attendance: 8,000

10 February 1968 Friendly	Partizan (Socialist Federal Republic of Yugoslavia)	3–1	(Hungary) Diósgyőr	Mostar
	Hasanagić; Hošić; Petrović

11 February 1968 Friendly	Velež (Socialist Federal Republic of Yugoslavia)	0–4	(Socialist Federal Republic of Yugoslavia) Partizan	Mostar
			Vukelić; Hasanagić; Hošić; Petrović

== Competitions ==
=== Yugoslav First League ===
Pos	Team	Pld	W	D	L	GF	GA	GD	Pts	Qualification
1	Red Star Belgrade (C)	30	16	11	3	64	30	+34	43	Qualification for European Cup first round
2	Partizan	30	15	8	7	45	31	+14	38	
3	Dinamo Zagreb	30	12	11	7	45	33	+12	35	Invitation for Inter-Cities Fairs Cup first round
4	Hajduk Split	30	12	10	8	44	37	+7	34	
5	Željezničar	30	12	9	9	44	34	+10	33	

Source: rsssf.org
Rules for classification: 1) points; 2) goal difference; 3) number of goals scored.
(C) Champions

20 August 1967 1	Zagreb	0–0	Partizan	Zagreb
				Attendance: 10,000; Referee: Šestić (Mostar)

27 August 1967 2	Dinamo Zagreb	1–1	Partizan	Zagreb
			Pirmajer 48'	Stadium: Stadion Maksimir; Attendance: 30,000; Referee: Kostovski (Skopje)

3 September 1967 3	Partizan	2–0	OFK Beograd	Belgrade
	Hasanagić 34'; Prekazi 71'			Stadium: Stadion JNA; Attendance: 20,000; Referee: Čanak (Beograd)

10 September 1967 4	Maribor	2–2	Partizan	Maribor
			Đorđević 21'; Mihajlović 78'	Stadium: Ljudski vrt Attendance: 12,000; Referee: Tešanić (Varaždin)

17 September 1967 5	Partizan	1–0	Sarajevo	Belgrade
	Hasanagić 46' (pen.)			Stadium: Stadion JNA; Attendance: 30,000; Referee: Strmečki (Zagreb)

24 September 1967 6	Radnički Niš	3–1	Partizan	Niš
			Vukelić 77'	Attendance: 22,000

12 October 1967 7	Partizan	1–1	Rijeka	Belgrade
	Bajić 13'			Stadium: Stadion JNA; Attendance: 12,000; Referee: Selimović (Sarajevo)

15 October 1967 8	Vojvodina	0–1	Partizan	Novi Sad
			Pogarčić 58'	Stadium: Karađorđe Stadium; Attendance: 14,000; Referee: Josip Strmečki (Zagreb)

22 October 1967 9	Partizan	1–0	Crvena zvezda	Belgrade
	Hasanagić 35'			Stadium: Marakana; Attendance: 60,000; Referee: Ratko Čanak (Beograd)

29 October 1967 10	Hajduk Split	0–1	Partizan	Split
			Pirmajer 88'	Stadium: Stadion Stari plac Attendance: 18,000; Referee: Alija Šestić (Mostar)

4 November 1967 11	Partizan	3–2	Olimpija	Belgrade
	Pirmajer 20', 82'; Radaković 26'			Stadium: Stadion JNA; Attendance: 10,000; Referee: Selimović (Sarajevo)

19 November 1967 12	Željezničar	1–0	Partizan	Sarajevo
				Stadium: Stadion Grbavica; Attendance: 20,000; Referee: Gugulović (Niš)

25 November 1967 13	Partizan	2–1	Velež	Belgrade
	Hasanagić 12'; Pirmajer 83'			Stadium: Stadion JNA; Attendance: 8,000; Referee: Tropkovski (Skoplje)

3 December 1967 14	Vardar	1–0	Partizan	Skopje
				Stadium: City Park Stadium; Attendance: 20,000; Referee: Strmečki (Zagreb)

10 December 1967 15	Partizan	5–2	Proleter	Belgrade
	Hošić 17', 79'; Hasanagić 33'; Pirmajer 42'; Bajić 65'			Stadium: Stadion JNA; Attendance: 8,000; Referee: Ratko Čanak (Beograd)

10 March 1968 16	Partizan	2–0	Zagreb	Belgrade
	Hošić 6'; Hasanagić 58'			Stadium: Stadion JNA; Attendance: 15,000

17 March 1968 17	Partizan	2–0	Dinamo Zagreb	Belgrade
	Pirmajer 25', 30'			Stadium: Stadion JNA; Attendance: 35,000; Referee: Radunović (Titograd)

24 March 1968 18	OFK Beograd	1–1	Partizan	Belgrade
			Pirmajer 55'	Stadium: Omladinski Stadium; Attendance: 30,000; Referee: Trpkovski (Skopje)

30 March 1968 19	Partizan	4–1	Maribor	Belgrade
	Petrović 4'; Hošić 15', 72'; Prekazi 71'			Stadium: Stadion JNA; Attendance: 8,000

14 April 1968 20	Sarajevo	3–1	Partizan	Sarajevo
			Vukelić 50'	Attendance: 30,000

18 April 1968 21	Partizan	2–0	Radnički Niš	Belgrade
	Prekazi 51'; Bajić 88'			Stadium: Stadion JNA

1 May 1968 22	Rijeka	1–2	Partizan	Rijeka
			Đorđević 20'; Bajić 81'	Stadium: Stadion Kantrida; Attendance: 8,000

5 May 1968 23	Partizan	3–2	Vojvodina	Belgrade
	Pirmajer 14'; Vukelić 85', 90'			Stadium: Stadion JNA; Attendance: 10,000; Referee: Gugulović (Niš)

12 May 1968 24	Crvena zvezda	2–2	Partizan	Belgrade
	Džajić 35'; Aćimović 73'		Hošić 41'; Dojčinovski 67' (o.g.)	Stadium: Marakana; Attendance: 65,000

18 May 1968 25	Partizan	2–2	Hajduk Split	Belgrade
	Hošić 8'; Bajić 89'			Stadium: Stadion JNA; Attendance: 25,000; Referee: Miloš Čajić (Beograd)

26 May 1968 26	Olimpija	2–1	Partizan	Ljubljana
			Hošić 52'	Attendance: 17,000

16 June 1968 27	Partizan	1–1	Željezničar	Belgrade
	Damjanović 50'			Stadium: Stadion JNA; Attendance: 8,000

19 June 1968 28	Velež	1–0	Partizan	Mostar
				Attendance: 5,000

22 June 1968 29	Partizan	1–0	Vardar	Belgrade
	Đorđević 75'			Stadium: Stadion JNA; Attendance: 6,000; Referee: Selimović (Sarajevo)

30 June 1968 30	Proleter	1–0	Partizan	Zrenjanin
				Attendance: 4,000

=== Yugoslav Cup ===
22 November 1967 Round of 32	Partizan	2–0	Voždovački	Belgrade
	Bajić 13'; Petrović 52'

3 March 1968 Round of 16	Vojvodina	2–0	Partizan	Novi Sad
				Stadium: Karađorđe Stadium; Attendance: 20,000

=== Inter-Cities Fairs Cup ===
==== First round ====
27 September 1967 First round 1st leg	Partizan (Socialist Federal Republic of Yugoslavia)	5–1	(Bulgaria) Lokomotiv Plovdiv	Belgrade, Yugoslavia
	Hasanagić 44', 57', 88'; Kovačević 46'; Rašović 70'		Iliev 57'	Stadium: Partizan Stadium; Attendance: 5,200; Referee: Alfred Ott

25 October 1967 First round 2nd leg	Lokomotiv Plovdiv (Bulgaria)	1–1 (2 – 6 agg.)	(Socialist Federal Republic of Yugoslavia) Partizan	Plovdiv, Bulgaria
	Vasilev 57'		Petrović 31'	Stadium: 9th September Stadium; Attendance: 4,000; Referee: Alfred Ott

==== Second round ====
29 November 1967 Second round 1st leg	Partizan (Socialist Federal Republic of Yugoslavia)	1–2	(England) Leeds United	Belgrade, Yugoslavia
	Paunović 87'		Lorimer 24'; Belfitt 53'	Stadium: Partizan Stadium; Attendance: 10,000; Referee: Dogan Babacan (Turkey)

6 December 1967 Second round 2nd leg	Leeds United (England)	1–1 (3 – 2 agg.)	(Socialist Federal Republic of Yugoslavia) Partizan	Leeds, England
	Lorimer 29'		Petrović 61'	Stadium: Elland Road; Attendance: 34,258; Referee: Ottmar Huber (Austria)

== See also ==
- List of FK Partizan seasons
