= Miodrag Knežević =

Yugoslav and Serbian footballer (1940–2022)

Personal information
- Full name: Miodrag Knežević
- Date of birth: 22 August 1940
- Place of birth: Aleksandrovac, Yugoslavia
- Date of death: 25 June 2022 (aged 81)
- Place of death: Niš, Serbia
- Height: 1.81 m (5 ft 11 in)
- Position: Goalkeeper

Youth career
- 1957–1960: Napredak Aleksinac

Senior career*
Years	Team	Apps	(Gls)
1960–1971	Radnički Niš	291	(1)
1971–1972	Partizan	14	(0)
1974	Radnički Niš	3	(0)
Total		308	(1)

International career
1966–1967	Yugoslavia	2	(0)
- * Club domestic league appearances and goals

Miodrag Knežević (Serbian Cyrillic: Миодраг Кнежевић; 22 August 1940 – 25 June 2022) was a Yugoslav and Serbian professional footballer who played as a goalkeeper.

== Club career ==
Born in Gornji Stupanj, a village near Aleksandrovac, Knežević went to school in Aleksinac and began playing football at local club Napredak. He joined Yugoslav Second League side Radnički Niš in 1960, helping them win promotion to the Yugoslav First League in 1962. Over the next nine seasons, Knežević established himself as the team's undisputed first-choice goalkeeper, making over 250 appearances and scoring one goal in the top flight.

In 1971, Knežević was close to signing with Rapid Wien, but instead moved to Partizan. He spent one season with the club before hanging up his boots. In March 1974, Knežević briefly came out of retirement and made three league appearances for Radnički Niš in the remainder of the 1973–74 season.

== International career ==
At international level, Knežević was capped twice for Yugoslavia between 1966 and 1967.

== Career statistics ==
=== Club ===
Appearances and goals by club, season and competition
Club	Season	League		
Club	Season	Division	Apps	Goals
Radnički Niš	1960–61	Yugoslav Second League	14	0
Radnički Niš	1961–62	Yugoslav Second League	8	0
Radnički Niš	1962–63	Yugoslav First League	25	0
Radnički Niš	1963–64	Yugoslav First League	26	0
Radnički Niš	1964–65	Yugoslav First League	28	0
Radnički Niš	1965–66	Yugoslav First League	30	1
Radnički Niš	1966–67	Yugoslav First League	30	0
Radnički Niš	1967–68	Yugoslav First League	28	0
Radnički Niš	1968–69	Yugoslav First League	34	0
Radnički Niš	1969–70	Yugoslav First League	34	0
Radnički Niš	1970–71	Yugoslav First League	34	0
Radnički Niš	Total		291	1
Partizan	1971–72	Yugoslav First League	14	0
Radnički Niš	1973–74	Yugoslav First League	3	0
Career total			308	1

=== International ===
Appearances and goals by national team and year
National team	Year	Apps	Goals
Yugoslavia	1966	1	0
Yugoslavia	1967	1	0
Total		2	0
