= List of FK Partizan managers =

Fudbalski klub Partizan is a Serbian professional association football club based in Belgrade, Serbia, who currently play in the Serbian SuperLiga. They have played at their current home ground, Partizan Stadium, since 1949.

In Partizan's history, 41 coaches have coached the club. The first manager was Franjo Glaser. Ljubiša Tumbaković had the longest reign as Partizan coach, with nine years (seven consecutive) in charge, and is the most successful coach in Partizan history with six national championships, and three national cup wins.

== Managers ==
The following is the list of FK Partizan head coaches and their respective tenures on the bench:

- (Socialist Federal Republic of Yugoslavia) Franjo Glaser (1945)
- (Hungary) Illés Spitz (1946–October 1951)
- (Socialist Federal Republic of Yugoslavia) Toni Pogačnik (October 1951–until the second half of the season 1952/53)
- (Hungary) Illés Spitz (second half of the season 1952/53)
- (Socialist Federal Republic of Yugoslavia) Milovan Ćirić (1953–54)
- (Hungary) Illés Spitz (1954–55)
- (Socialist Federal Republic of Yugoslavia) Aleksandar Tomašević (1955–56)
- (Socialist Federal Republic of Yugoslavia) Kiril Simonovski (1956/57–Jan 57)
- (Socialist Federal Republic of Yugoslavia) Florijan Matekalo (Jan 1957–July 1957)
- (Hungary) Géza Kalocsay (July 1957–1958)
- (Hungary) Illés Spitz (1958/59–1959/60)
- (Socialist Federal Republic of Yugoslavia) Stjepan Bobek (1960/61–until the end of the season 1962/63)
- (Socialist Federal Republic of Yugoslavia) Kiril Simonovski (at the end of the season 1962/63)
- (Socialist Federal Republic of Yugoslavia) Marko Valok (Autumn 1963–Feb 64)
- (Socialist Federal Republic of Yugoslavia) Florijan Matekalo (February 1964–Aug 1, 1964)
- (Socialist Federal Republic of Yugoslavia) Aleksandar Atanacković (Aug 1964–December 1964)
- (Socialist Federal Republic of Yugoslavia) Marko Valok (December 1964–Autumn 65)
- (Socialist Federal Republic of Yugoslavia) Abdulah Gegić (Autumn 1965–June 66)
- (Socialist Federal Republic of Yugoslavia) Kiril Simonovski (June 1966–October 66)
- (Socialist Federal Republic of Yugoslavia) Stevan Vilotić (October 1966–Summer 67)
- (Socialist Federal Republic of Yugoslavia) Stjepan Bobek (July 1967 – June 1969)
- (Socialist Federal Republic of Yugoslavia) Stevan Vilotić (Summer 1969–Nov 69)
- (Socialist Federal Republic of Yugoslavia) Kiril Simonovski (November 1969 – July 1970)
- (Socialist Federal Republic of Yugoslavia) Gojko Zec (July 1970–Dec 23, 1971)
- (Socialist Federal Republic of Yugoslavia) Velibor Vasović (Dec 24, 1971–Nov 29, 1973)
- (Socialist Federal Republic of Yugoslavia) Mirko Damjanović (Nov 30, 1973–Nov 16, 1974)
- (Socialist Federal Republic of Yugoslavia) Tomislav Kaloperović (Nov 17, 1974–Oct 15, 1976)
- (Socialist Federal Republic of Yugoslavia) Jovan Miladinović (Oct 16, 1976–Dec 31, 1976)
- (Socialist Federal Republic of Yugoslavia) Ante Mladinić (Jan 12, 1977–Dec 31, 1978)
- (Socialist Federal Republic of Yugoslavia) Florijan Matekalo (Jan 1, 1979–April 14, 1979)
- (Socialist Federal Republic of Yugoslavia) Jovan Miladinović (April 15, 1979–July 1, 1979)
- (Socialist Federal Republic of Yugoslavia) Josip Duvančić (July 1, 1979–June 30, 1980)
- (Socialist Federal Republic of Yugoslavia) Tomislav Kaloperović (July 1, 1980–July 1, 1982)
- (Socialist Federal Republic of Yugoslavia) Miloš Milutinović (July 1, 1982–August 19, 1984)
- (Socialist Federal Republic of Yugoslavia) Nenad Bjeković (Aug 19, 1984–June 30, 1987)
- (Socialist Federal Republic of Yugoslavia) Fahrudin Jusufi (July 1, 1987–Sept 12, 1988)
- (Socialist Federal Republic of Yugoslavia) Momčilo Vukotić (Sept 12, 1988–Sept 27, 1989)
- (Socialist Federal Republic of Yugoslavia) Ivan Golac (Sept 27, 1989–April 26, 1990)
- (Socialist Federal Republic of Yugoslavia) Nenad Bjeković (April 29, 1990–July 1, 1990)
- (Socialist Federal Republic of Yugoslavia) Miloš Milutinović (July 1, 1990–July 1, 1991)
- (Socialist Federal Republic of Yugoslavia) Ivica Osim (July 1, 1991–July 3, 1992)
- (Federal Republic of Yugoslavia) Ljubiša Tumbaković (July 3, 1992–June, 1999)
- (Federal Republic of Yugoslavia) Miodrag Ješić (June 3, 1999–May 21, 2000)
- (Federal Republic of Yugoslavia) Ljubiša Tumbaković (May 24, 2000–Dec 18, 2002)
- (Germany) Lothar Matthäus (Dec 22, 2002–Dec 13, 2003)
- (Serbia and Montenegro) Vladimir Vermezović (Jan 6, 2004–Oct 2, 2005)
- (Germany) Jürgen Röber (Oct 6, 2005–May 11, 2006)
- (Serbia) Miodrag Ješić (May 18, 2006–Jan 9, 2007)
- (Serbia) Miroslav Đukić (Jan 9, 2007–Dec 19, 2007)
- (Serbia) Slaviša Jokanović (Dec 25, 2007–Sept 5, 2009)
- (Serbia) Goran Stevanović (Sept 5, 2009–April 16, 2010)
- (Serbia) Aleksandar Stanojević (April 16, 2010–Jan 12, 2012)
- (Israel) Avram Grant (Jan 12, 2012–May 18, 2012)
- (Serbia) Vladimir Vermezović (May 18, 2012–April 29, 2013)
- (Serbia) Vuk Rašović (April 29, 2013–Dec 16, 2013)
- (Serbia) Marko Nikolić (Dec 16, 2013–March 25, 2015)
- (Serbia) Zoran Milinković (March 25, 2015–Oct 15, 2015)
- (Serbia) Ljubinko Drulović (Oct 15, 2015–Dec 21, 2015)
- (Serbia) Ivan Tomić (Dec 21, 2015–July 31, 2016)
- (Serbia) Marko Nikolić (Aug 4, 2016–May 31, 2017)
- (Serbia) Miroslav Đukić (June 5, 2017–August 3, 2018)
- (Serbia) Zoran Mirković (Aug 4, 2018–March 10, 2019)
- (Serbia) Savo Milošević (March 27, 2019–September 1, 2020)
- (Serbia) Aleksandar Stanojević (September 2, 2020–June 8, 2022)
- (Serbia) Ilija Stolica (June 9, 2022–August 11, 2022)
- (Serbia) Gordan Petrić (August 12, 2022–February 24, 2023)
- (Serbia) Igor Duljaj (March 1, 2023–April 29, 2024)
- (Serbia) Albert Nađ (April 29, 2024–June 5, 2024)
- (Serbia) Aleksandar Stanojević (June 13, 2024–September 24, 2024)
- (Serbia) Savo Milošević (September 27, 2024–December 2, 2024)
- (Serbia) Srđan Blagojević (January 1, 2025–November 2, 2025)
- (Serbia) Nenad Stojaković (November 13, 2025–February 23, 2026)
- (Montenegro) Damir Čakar (February 23, 2026–March 9, 2026)
- (Serbia) Srđan Blagojević (March 9, 2026–June 8, 2026)
- (Serbia) Saša Ilić (June 9, 2026–October 24, 2026)
- (Serbia) Aleksandar Stanojević (October 25, 2026–Present)

== Managerial statistics (1970–present) ==
As of 22 November 2026

Coach	Nat	From	To	Record				
Coach	Nat	From	To	G	W	D	L	Win %
Gojko Zec	(Socialist Federal Republic of Yugoslavia)	July 1970	December 1971	54	20	15	19	37.04
Velibor Vasović	(Socialist Federal Republic of Yugoslavia)	December 1971	November 1973	68	30	22	16	44.12
Mirko Damjanović	(Socialist Federal Republic of Yugoslavia)	November 1973	November 1974	38	14	13	11	36.84
Tomislav Kaloperović	(Socialist Federal Republic of Yugoslavia)	November 1974	October 1976	67	37	13	17	55.22
Jovan Miladinović	(Socialist Federal Republic of Yugoslavia)	October 1976	December 1976	11	4	2	5	36.36
Ante Mladinić	(Socialist Federal Republic of Yugoslavia)	January 1977	December 1978	82	40	29	13	48.78
Florijan Matekalo	(Socialist Federal Republic of Yugoslavia)	January 1979	April 1979	8	2	2	4	25.00
Jovan Miladinović	(Socialist Federal Republic of Yugoslavia)	April 1979	July 1979	13	3	4	6	23.08
Josip Duvančić	(Socialist Federal Republic of Yugoslavia)	July 1979	June 1980	37	12	13	12	32.43
Tomislav Kaloperović	(Socialist Federal Republic of Yugoslavia)	July 1980	July 1982	73	25	26	22	34.25
Miloš Milutinović	(Socialist Federal Republic of Yugoslavia)	July 1982	August 1984	75	35	24	16	46.67
Nenad Bjeković	(Socialist Federal Republic of Yugoslavia)	August 1984	June 1987	121	59	32	30	48.76
Fahrudin Jusufi	(Socialist Federal Republic of Yugoslavia)	July 1987	September 1988	47	24	13	10	51.06
Momčilo Vukotić	(Socialist Federal Republic of Yugoslavia)	September 1988	September 1989	47	22	10	15	46.81
Ivan Golac	(Socialist Federal Republic of Yugoslavia)	September 1989	July 1990	31	17	1	13	54.84
Nenad Bjeković	(Socialist Federal Republic of Yugoslavia)	April 1990	July 1990	4	3	1	0	75.00
Miloš Milutinović	(Socialist Federal Republic of Yugoslavia)	July 1990	July 1991	45	23	9	13	51.11
Ivica Osim	(Socialist Federal Republic of Yugoslavia)	July 1991	July 1992	42	29	5	8	69.05
Ljubiša Tumbaković	(Federal Republic of Yugoslavia)	July 1992	June 1999	295	214	46	35	72.54
Miodrag Ješić	(Federal Republic of Yugoslavia)	June 1999	May 2000	50	37	6	7	74.00
Ljubiša Tumbaković	(Federal Republic of Yugoslavia)	May 2000	December 2002	110	80	15	15	72.73
Lothar Matthäus	(Germany)	December 2002	December 2003	45	30	6	9	66.67
Vladimir Vermezović	(Federal Republic of Yugoslavia)	January 2004	October 2005	78	51	19	8	65.38
Jürgen Röber	(Germany)	October 2005	May 2006	24	17	5	2	70.83
Miodrag Ješić	(Serbia)	May 2006	January 2007	26	12	5	9	46.15
Miroslav Đukić	(Serbia)	January 2007	December 2007	37	26	5	6	70.27
Slaviša Jokanović	(Serbia)	December 2007	September 2009	76	54	12	10	71.05
Goran Stevanović	(Serbia)	September 2009	April 2010	30	19	5	6	63.33
Aleksandar Stanojević	(Serbia)	April 2010	January 2012	80	60	7	13	75.00
Avram Grant	(Israel)	January 2012	May 2012	16	11	2	3	68.75
Vladimir Vermezović	(Serbia)	May 2012	April 2013	39	22	7	10	56.41
Vuk Rašović	(Serbia)	April 2013	December 2013	29	18	5	6	62.07
Marko Nikolić	(Serbia)	December 2013	March 2015	51	34	11	6	66.67
Zoran Milinković	(Serbia)	March 2015	October 2015	32	19	7	6	59.38
Ljubinko Drulović	(Serbia)	October 2015	December 2015	15	7	3	5	46.67
Ivan Tomić	(Serbia)	December 2015	August 2016	23	13	4	6	56.52
Marko Nikolić	(Serbia)	August 2016	June 2017	41	35	4	2	85.37
Miroslav Đukić	(Serbia)	June 2017	August 2018	63	36	15	12	57.14
Zoran Mirković	(Serbia)	August 2018	March 2019	30	17	10	3	56.67
Žarko Lazetić	(Serbia)	March 2019	March 2019	2	1	0	1	50.00
Savo Milošević	(Serbia)	March 2019	September 2020	67	43	9	15	64.18
Aleksandar Stanojević	(Serbia)	September 2020	May 2022	97	74	12	11	76.29
Ilija Stolica	(Serbia)	June 2022	August 2022	6	1	3	2	16.67
Gordan Petrić	(Serbia)	August 2022	February 2023	30	18	8	4	60.00
Igor Duljaj	(Serbia)	March 2023	April 2024	54	30	9	15	55.56
Albert Nađ	(Serbia)	April 2024	June 2024	5	2	2	1	40.00
Aleksandar Stanojević	(Serbia)	June 2024	September 2024	13	3	3	7	23.08
Savo Milošević	(Serbia)	September 2024	December 2024	9	7	2	0	77.78
Marko Jovanović	(Serbia)	December 2024	January 2025	5	3	1	1	60.00
Srđan Blagojević	(Serbia)	January 2025	November 2025	39	24	7	8	61.54
Marko Jovanović	(Serbia)	November 2025	November 2025	2	2	0	0	100.00
Nenad Stojaković	(Serbia)	November 2025	February 2026	9	5	1	3	55.56
Damir Čakar	(Montenegro)	February 2026	March 2026	2	0	0	2	0.00
Srđan Blagojević	(Serbia)	March 2026	June 2026	11	5	5	1	45.45
Saša Ilić	(Serbia)	June 2026	October 2026	18	8	2	8	44.44
Aleksandar Stanojević	(Serbia)	October 2026		5	3	0	2	60.00
Total				2,427	1,441	495	491	59.37
