= 1970–71 Yugoslav First League =

Prva savezna liga
- Season: 1970–71
- Dates: 23 August 1970 – 27 June 1971
- Champions: Hajduk Split; 4th Federal League title 6th Yugoslav title overall
- Relegated: Bor; Crvenka
- European Cup: Hajduk Split
- Cup Winners' Cup: Red Star
- UEFA Cup: Željezničar; Dinamo Zagreb; OFK Beograd
- Top goalscorer: Petar Nadoveza; Božo Janković (20 goals each)

The 1970–71 Yugoslav First League season was the 25th season of the First Federal League (Serbo-Croatian: Prva savezna liga), the top level association football league of SFR Yugoslavia, since its establishment in 1946. Eighteen teams contested the competition, which ended with Hajduk Split winning their fourth title, club's first in 16 years.

== Events and incidents ==
=== Week 7: Hajduk v. OFK Beograd abandoned match and subsequent street riots in Split ===
The week 7 Hajduk vs. OFK Beograd league fixture at Split's Stari plac Stadium on 23 September 1970 was stopped and ultimately abandoned over an incident caused by Hajduk's fans. With the score tied at 2-2 in the 52nd minute, match referee Pavle Ristić from Novi Sad fell unconscious after getting hit in the head with an object thrown from the stands. As a result, the match was immediately stopped and abandoned. A few days later, the Yugoslav FA's (FSJ) disciplinary body made a ruling to register the contest by awarding a 0-3 win to the visiting OFK Beograd.

In Split, the disciplinary measure set off violent street protests that quickly assumed a distinctly anti-Belgrade and anti-Serb tone and ended up lasting for days. Led by the club's ultra fan group, Torcida, the practice of seeking out parked cars with the city of Belgrade license plates and pushing them into the Adriatic Sea off the docks was especially widespread in Split during the protests. The press also reported about some of the gathered mob spontaneously launching into a cynical and sarcastic rendition of Sergio Endrigo's then current and popular song "Kud plovi ovaj brod" ('Where is This Ship Going') as the cars with Belgrade plates were pushed into the sea and floated in the water before sinking.

Due to the undertones of ethnic hatred and potential to undermine the country's official inter-ethnic guiding principle during the politically sensitive time when MASPOK was gathering steam in SR Croatia, the Split football protests quickly came to the attention of Yugoslav federal authorities that decided to deal with the situation by pressing FSJ into changing its disciplinary ruling and registering the original 2-2 score. FSJ did exactly that, reinstating the score at the moment when the match was abandoned as the official result.

== League table ==
Pos	Team	Pld	W	D	L	GF	GA	GD	Pts	Qualification or relegation
1	Hajduk Split (C)	34	18	13	3	61	31	+30	49	Qualification for European Cup first round
2	Željezničar	34	18	9	7	59	34	+25	45	Qualification for UEFA Cup first round
3	Dinamo Zagreb	34	17	9	8	55	32	+23	43	Qualification for UEFA Cup first round
4	OFK Belgrade	34	15	8	11	54	44	+10	38	Qualification for UEFA Cup first round
5	Partizan	34	14	10	10	44	34	+10	38	
6	Red Star Belgrade	34	14	8	12	62	46	+16	36	Qualification for Cup Winners' Cup first round
7	Olimpija	34	13	10	11	47	35	+12	36	
8	Velež	34	14	8	12	52	48	+4	36	
9	Čelik	34	14	8	12	35	32	+3	36	
10	Sloboda Tuzla	34	9	14	11	23	29	−6	32	
11	Radnički Niš	34	11	9	14	38	43	−5	31	
12	Sarajevo	34	9	11	14	42	51	−9	29	
13	Maribor	34	9	11	14	33	48	−15	29	
14	Borac Banja Luka	34	9	11	14	47	66	−19	29	
15	Vojvodina	34	9	10	15	38	43	−5	28	
16	Radnički Kragujevac	34	9	10	15	29	50	−21	28	
17	Bor (R)	34	9	8	17	43	66	−23	26	Relegation to Yugoslav Second League
18	Crvenka (R)	34	8	7	19	28	58	−30	23	Relegation to Yugoslav Second League

Source: rsssf.org
Rules for classification: 1) points; 2) goal difference; 3) number of goals scored.
(C) Champions; (R) Relegated

== Results ==
Home \ Away	BOR	BBL	CRV	ČEL	DIN	HAJ	MAR	OFK	OLI	PAR	RDK	RNI	RSB	SAR	SLO	VEL	VOJ	ŽEL
Bor		3–2	1–0	3–3	1–2	0–0	2–0	3–0	1–1	2–0	1–0	1–3	2–4	1–2	0–0	3–1	1–1	1–1
Borac Banja Luka	4–1		1–1	3–0	1–3	1–2	3–1	1–0	1–1	1–0	2–2	2–1	1–1	3–1	1–0	3–7	1–1	3–2
Crvenka	0–2	1–1		1–1	2–6	1–1	2–1	2–0	0–0	0–1	5–1	0–0	1–0	2–1	1–0	2–0	1–3	2–2
Čelik	0–2	0–0	3–1		1–1	1–0	0–0	2–0	0–0	0–2	2–0	2–0	2–0	3–0	2–0	2–0	1–0	1–1
Dinamo Zagreb	4–3	5–0	1–0	1–0		0–1	1–1	3–0	2–0	4–0	2–1	3–2	0–0	2–1	1–1	1–1	4–1	0–1
Hajduk Split	4–0	5–1	2–1	1–1	3–1		1–0	2–2	2–1	0–0	5–0	3–1	4–2	0–0	0–0	3–0	2–1	2–1
Maribor	3–2	1–1	1–0	2–1	1–1	2–2		2–2	1–0	0–0	1–0	1–0	1–1	2–0	3–2	1–1	2–0	0–0
OFK Belgrade	7–2	2–1	3–0	1–0	2–0	3–1	1–0		1–0	0–2	7–1	0–0	2–1	4–2	3–0	4–1	1–0	2–0
Olimpija	2–1	3–2	5–0	1–0	1–0	0–0	3–1	3–0		2–0	0–0	0–1	4–2	3–0	0–1	4–1	2–2	1–3
Partizan	1–1	3–1	4–0	0–2	2–0	3–4	3–1	0–0	2–0		1–0	3–1	0–2	0–0	2–1	3–0	1–0	1–2
Radnički Kragujevac	1–0	1–1	2–0	0–1	2–1	2–3	1–1	2–0	1–1	0–2		3–0	0–2	3–0	0–0	0–0	1–0	1–0
Radnički Niš	4–1	3–2	2–0	1–2	1–1	0–1	2–1	1–1	0–0	0–0	3–0		0–3	1–1	0–1	2–0	1–0	2–0
Red Star	1–0	5–0	4–0	5–0	0–2	1–1	1–0	3–3	0–1	1–2	3–1	1–2		4–2	2–2	2–1	2–0	1–4
Sarajevo	4–0	1–1	2–0	1–0	0–1	1–1	3–1	4–3	3–2	0–0	1–1	4–1	3–1		0–1	1–4	0–0	0–0
Sloboda Tuzla	1–1	0–0	1–0	1–0	0–0	1–1	2–0	0–0	0–1	1–1	0–0	1–1	1–1	2–1		1–2	0–1	1–0
Velež	2–0	2–0	3–0	0–2	0–1	0–0	4–1	3–0	3–2	1–0	0–1	1–0	3–2	2–2	2–0		3–1	1–1
Vojvodina	2–0	3–0	2–0	3–0	1–1	1–3	1–0	2–0	2–2	3–3	2–0	1–1	1–4	0–0	0–1	1–1		1–2
Željezničar	6–1	4–2	1–2	1–0	1–0	2–1	5–0	0–0	2–1	3–2	3–0	3–1	0–0	2–1	2–0	2–2	2–1	

Source: DataSoccer.it
Legend: Blue = home team win; Yellow = draw; Red = away team win.

== Winning squad ==
- HAJDUK SPLIT (coach Slavko Luštica)

Pos	Player	Apps	Goals
MF	(Socialist Federal Republic of Yugoslavia) Ivica Hlevnjak	34	6
DF	(Socialist Federal Republic of Yugoslavia) Dragan Holcer	33	0
MF	(Socialist Federal Republic of Yugoslavia) Jurica Jerković	33	11
DF	(Socialist Federal Republic of Yugoslavia) Vilson Džoni	32	0
FW	(Socialist Federal Republic of Yugoslavia) Ivan Pavlica	30	7
	(Socialist Federal Republic of Yugoslavia) Marino Lemešić	29	1
	(Socialist Federal Republic of Yugoslavia) Mićun Jovanić	29	7
GK	(Socialist Federal Republic of Yugoslavia) Radomir Vukčević	25	0
FW	(Socialist Federal Republic of Yugoslavia) Pero Nadoveza	24	20
	(Socialist Federal Republic of Yugoslavia) Miroslav Vardić	23	4
DF	(Socialist Federal Republic of Yugoslavia) Mario Boljat	20	0
DF	(Socialist Federal Republic of Yugoslavia) Ivan Buljan	16	1
DF	(Socialist Federal Republic of Yugoslavia) Miroslav Bošković	16	1
DF	(Socialist Federal Republic of Yugoslavia) Luka Peruzović	14	0
	(Socialist Federal Republic of Yugoslavia) Dinko Žutelija	12	1
MF	(Socialist Federal Republic of Yugoslavia) Dražen Mužinić	11	0
GK	(Socialist Federal Republic of Yugoslavia) Ante Sirković	9	0
	(Socialist Federal Republic of Yugoslavia) Joško Gluić	8	0
	(Socialist Federal Republic of Yugoslavia) Veselin Zrilić	8	0
	(Socialist Federal Republic of Yugoslavia) Vladimir Smolčić	3	0
	(Socialist Federal Republic of Yugoslavia) Ivica Matković	2	0
	(Socialist Federal Republic of Yugoslavia) Miroslav Ferić	1	1
	(Socialist Federal Republic of Yugoslavia) Ante Ivković	1	0

== Top scorers ==
Rank	Player	Club	Goals
1	(Socialist Federal Republic of Yugoslavia) Petar Nadoveza	Hajduk Split	20
1	(Socialist Federal Republic of Yugoslavia) Božo Janković	Željezničar	20
3	(Socialist Federal Republic of Yugoslavia) Josip Bukal	Željezničar	19
3	(Socialist Federal Republic of Yugoslavia) Slobodan Santrač	OFK Belgrade	19
5	(Socialist Federal Republic of Yugoslavia) Zoran Filipović	Red Star	18
6	(Socialist Federal Republic of Yugoslavia) Dušan Bajević	Velež	17
7	(Socialist Federal Republic of Yugoslavia) Salem Halilhodžić	Velež	14
7	(Socialist Federal Republic of Yugoslavia) Petar Nikezić	Vojvodina	14
9	(Socialist Federal Republic of Yugoslavia) Nenad Cvetković	Radnički Niš	13
9	(Socialist Federal Republic of Yugoslavia) Husnija Fazlić	Borac Banja Luka	13
9	(Socialist Federal Republic of Yugoslavia) Slobodan Radović	Bor	13

== See also ==
- 1970–71 Yugoslav Cup
- Football Association of Yugoslavia
