= Ivica Pogarčić =

Footballer (1947–2010)

Personal information
- Full name: Ivica Pogarčić
- Date of birth: 12 January 1947
- Place of birth: Zenica, SFR Yugoslavia
- Date of death: 15 January 2010 (aged 63)
- Place of death: SFR Yugoslavia
- Height: 1.75 m (5 ft 9 in)
- Position: Forward

Youth career
- 1963–1964: Timok

Senior career*
Years	Team	Apps	(Gls)
1964–1967	Timok		
1967–1968	Partizan	16	(13)
1968–1970	Bor	35	(2)
1970–197x	Hajduk Veljko		
- * Club domestic league appearances and goals

Ivica Pogarčić (12 January 1947 – 2010) was a Bosnian-Herzegovinian football forward who played for FK Partizan.

== Club career ==
Born in Zenica, SR Bosnia and Herzegovina, he started playing in Zaječar where he played four years with local side FK Timok, initially in their youth team. Soon after, he entered their senior squad competing in Serbian Republic League, Yugoslav third level. In the summer of 1967, he left Timok and joined Yugoslav giants FK Partizan. He made a total of 34 appearances and scored 25 goals at Partizan, of which 16 games and 13 goals were in the 1967–68 Yugoslav First League, one game in the Yugoslav Cup, and one in the 1967–68 Inter-Cities Fairs Cup.

In the summer of 1968, he left Partizan and joined newly promoted Yugoslav First League side FK Bor He played with Bor two seasons, until 1970, and made 35 appearances and scored two goals. Next, he joined FK Hajduk Veljko where along Ilija Zavišić they make a fierce attacking duo. He suffered from flat feet and special boots had to be made for him.
