= Zlatko Milić =

Serbian footballer (born 1952)

Zlatko Milić Златко Милић
Personal information
- Full name: Zlatko Milić
- Date of birth: 20 June 1952 (age 74)
- Place of birth: Pančevo, Vojvodina, Serbia, Yugoslavia
- Height: 1.89 m (6 ft 2 in)
- Position: Goalkeeper

Youth career
- 1965–1968: Partizan

Senior career*
Years	Team	Apps	(Gls)
1968–1975	Partizan	56	(0)
- * Club domestic league appearances and goals

Zlatko Milić (Serbian Cyrillic: Златко Милић; born 20 June 1952) is a retired Serbian footballer. He played for Partizan throughout his entire career in the mid-1970s.

== Career ==
Milić began his career within Partizan since 1965. Unlike many other players within the youth sector, he attended practice sessions whilst still attending school, being one of four players to do so. He was then promoted to the senior squad in 1968 alongside Aranđel Todorović as a reserve goalkeeper for Ivan Ćurković where he remained unused for the following four seasons without any activity. Unlike other players, Milić had been compared to Serbian goalkeeper Srđan Mrkušić as he had adopted a similar special tactical goalkeeping style that made the latter known within Yugoslav football. After Ćurković would leave for France, Milić finally made his debut during the 1972–73 season in a 0–1 victory over Dinamo Zagreb on 27 August 1972. He notably played in the infamous 1–1 match against Sloboda Tuzla where Jusuf Hatunić would break the leg of his teammate Zoran Racić who would then permanently retire from football following the match. His greatest highlight that same season saw Milić participate in Partizan's debut at the 1974–75 UEFA Cup, beating out Polish club Górnik Zabrze and Northern Irish club Portadown before being eliminated by German club Köln. However, he too would later leave Partizan by the first half of the 1975–76 season with Petar Borota soon succeeding him as the main Partizan goalkeeper.
