= Miroslav Vardić =

Yugoslav and Serbian footballer (1944–2018)

Personal information
- Full name: Miroslav Vardić
- Date of birth: 4 December 1944
- Place of birth: Bukoš, Yugoslavia
- Date of death: 7 May 2018 (aged 73)
- Place of death: Roden, Netherlands
- Height: 1.85 m (6 ft 1 in)
- Position: Midfielder

Youth career
- Čelik Belo Polje
- Radnik Surdulica

Senior career*
Years	Team	Apps	(Gls)
1962–1963	Dinamo Vranje		
1963–1966	Železničar Niš	91	(33)
1966–1967	Radnički Niš	28	(5)
1967–1971	Hajduk Split	94	(18)
1971–1972	Borovo	43	(11)
1972–1975	Helmond Sport	80	(12)
1975	Serbian White Eagles		
1975–1976	Helmond Sport	6	(3)
1976	NAC	13	(0)
1976–1978	Helmond Sport	58	(4)
Total		413	(86)

International career
1968	Yugoslavia	2	(0)
- * Club domestic league appearances and goals

Miroslav Vardić (Serbian Cyrillic: Мирослав Вардић; 4 December 1944 – 7 May 2018) was a Yugoslav and Serbian professional footballer who played as a midfielder.

== Club career ==
Born in Bukoš, a village near Vučitrn, Vardić went to school in Surdulica and made his first football steps at local clubs. He later played for Dinamo Vranje in the Serbian League South.

Between 1963 and 1966, Vardić spent three seasons with Železničar Niš in the Yugoslav Second League, before joining Yugoslav First League side Radnički Niš.

In 1967, Vardić was transferred to Hajduk Split. He helped the club win the title in the 1970–71 season. In 1975, Vardić moved to Canada and briefly played for National Soccer League side Serbian White Eagles. He also appeared for the team in the 1975 CONCACAF Champions' Cup.

== International career ==
At international level, Vardić was capped twice for Yugoslavia in 1968.

== Career statistics ==
=== Club ===
Appearances and goals by club, season and competition
Club	Season	League		
Club	Season	Division	Apps	Goals
Železničar Niš	1963–64	Yugoslav Second League	30	10
Železničar Niš	1964–65	Yugoslav Second League	30	7
Železničar Niš	1965–66	Yugoslav Second League	31	16
Železničar Niš	Total		91	33
Radnički Niš	1966–67	Yugoslav First League	28	5
Hajduk Split	1967–68	Yugoslav First League	29	8
Hajduk Split	1968–69	Yugoslav First League	31	5
Hajduk Split	1969–70	Yugoslav First League	11	1
Hajduk Split	1970–71	Yugoslav First League	23	4
Hajduk Split	Total		94	18
Borovo	1971–72	Yugoslav Second League	27	6
Borovo	1972–73	Yugoslav Second League	16	5
Borovo	Total		43	11
Helmond Sport	1972–73	Eerste Divisie	20	2
Helmond Sport	1973–74	Eerste Divisie	31	6
Helmond Sport	1974–75	Eerste Divisie	29	4
Helmond Sport	Total		80	12
Serbian White Eagles	1975	Canadian Soccer League		
Helmond Sport	1975–76	Eerste Divisie	6	3
NAC Breda	1975–76	Eredivisie	13	0
Helmond Sport	1976–77	Eerste Divisie	32	1
Helmond Sport	1977–78	Eerste Divisie	26	3
Helmond Sport	Total		58	4
Career total			413	86

=== International ===
Appearances and goals by national team and year
National team	Year	Apps	Goals
Yugoslavia	1968	2	0
Total		2	0

== Honours ==
Hajduk Split

- Yugoslav First League: 1970–71
