= Ante Ivković =

Croatian footballer

Personal information
- Date of birth: April 18, 1947 (age 79)
- Place of birth: FPR Yugoslavia
- Position: Midfielder

Senior career*
Years	Team	Apps	(Gls)
1964–1971	Hajduk Split	87	(8)
1972–1973	Borac Banja Luka		
1973	Hajduk Split		
1973	Toronto Croatia		
1975–1977	Luzern		
1977	AA Gent		
- * Club domestic league appearances and goals

Ante Ivković (born April 18, 1947) is a Croatian former footballer who played in the Yugoslav First League, National Soccer League, Swiss Challenge League, and Belgian Second Division.

== Club career ==
Ivković began his career in 1964 with Hajduk Split in the Yugoslav First League, and made his debut on August 14, 1965 against OFK Beograd. Throughout his time with Hajduk he won the league title in 1971, and the 1966–67 Yugoslav Cup. In 1972, he played with FK Borac Banja Luka, and returned to Hajduk in 1973. At the conclusion of the 1973 season he went abroad to play in the National Soccer League with Toronto Croatia. After his stint in Canada he played the remainder of his career in the Swiss Challenge League, and Belgian Second Division with FC Luzern, and K.A.A. Gent.
