= Mirko Damjanović =

Serbian football manager

Personal information
- Full name: Mirko Damjanović
- Date of birth: 1937
- Place of birth: Bugojno, Kingdom of Yugoslavia
- Date of death: 25 December 2010 (aged 72–73)
- Place of death: Belgrade, Serbia

Managerial career
- Years: Team
- 1973–1974: Partizan
- Rad
- Leotar
- Sartid Smederevo
- Sinđelić Beograd
- Takovo

Mirko Damjanović (Serbian Cyrillic: Мирко Дамјановић; 1937 – 25 December 2010) was a Serbian football coach. He was head coach of FK Partizan from 1973 to 1974.

He also worked in Zambia and Kuwait and at FK Rad, FK Leotar and FK Sartid among others, and finished his career as a coach of FK Takovo. Damjanović died on 26 December 2010.
