= Zoran Cvetanović =

Serbian footballer

Personal information
- Full name: Zoran Cvetanović
- Date of birth: 11 May 1953 (age 73)
- Place of birth: Belgrade, FPR Yugoslavia
- Position: Midfielder

Senior career*
Years	Team	Apps	(Gls)
1970–1975	Partizan	19	(1)
1975–1979	OFK Beograd		
- * Club domestic league appearances and goals

Zoran Cvetanović (Serbian Cyrillic: Зоран Цвeтановић; born 11 May 1953) is a Serbian retired footballer who played for FK Partizan.

From 2004 to 2012, he was FK Partizan's marketing director.
