= Miloš Radaković =

Serbian football manager and player

Personal information
- Date of birth: 29 September 1946 (age 80)
- Place of birth: Ivanjica, PR Serbia, FPR Yugoslavia
- Position: Defender

Senior career*
| Years | Team | Apps | (Gls) |
| 1965–1973 | Partizan | 193 | (5) |
| 1973–1977 | Fribourg | | |
| 1977–1981 | Nordstern Basel | | |
| 1981–1982 | Grenchen | | |
| 1982–1984 | Wettingen | 54 | (5) |

Managerial career
- 1975–1977: Fribourg (player-manager)
- 2002–2003: Partizan (assistant)
- 2005–2006: Partizan (assistant)
- 2007: Teleoptik
- * Club domestic league appearances and goals

Miloš Radaković (Serbian Cyrillic: Милош Радаковић; born 29 September 1946) is a Serbian former football manager and player.

== Playing career ==
Born in Ivanjica, Radaković joined the youth system of Partizan as a youngster on the recommendation of Vladica Kovačević. He made his senior debut with the club in the 1965–66 season, in which Partizan reached the final of the European Cup. In total, Radaković amassed 193 appearances and scored five goals in the Yugoslav First League over his eight seasons with the Crno-beli.

In 1973, Radaković moved abroad to Switzerland and signed with Fribourg. He also spent time at Nordstern Basel and Grenchen before finishing his playing career with Wettingen in 1984.

== Managerial career ==
From 1975 to 1977, Radaković served as player-manager of Fribourg. He later worked in Partizan's youth system for over a decade. In addition, Radaković also served as the club's assistant manager to Lothar Matthäus and Jürgen Röber.
