= Ivan Pavlica =

Serbian footballer

Personal information
- Date of birth: 17 March 1945 (age 81)
- Place of birth: Zagreb, Yugoslavia
- Position: Striker

Youth career
- Tekstiulac

Senior career*
Years	Team	Apps	(Gls)
1964–1966	Trešnjevka	33	(3)
1966–1968	NK Zagreb	56	(14)
1968–1972	Hajduk Split	104	(24)
1972–1973	FC Metz	5	(0)

International career
1969	Yugoslavia	1	(0)
- * Club domestic league appearances and goals

Ivan Pavlica (born 17 March 1945 in Yugoslavia) is a retired Croatian football player.

== International career ==
He made his debut for Yugoslavia in a February 1969 friendly match against Sweden, his sole international appearance.
