= Petar Nadoveza =

Croatian footballer and manager (1942–2023)

Personal information
- Date of birth: 9 April 1942
- Place of birth: Šibenik, Kingdom of Italy
- Date of death: 19 March 2023 (aged 80)
- Position: Striker

Youth career
- Šibenik

Senior career*
Years	Team	Apps	(Gls)
1959–1963	Šibenik	65	(30)
1963–1973	Hajduk Split	217	(108)
1973–1975	Lokeren	45	(15)
Total		327	(153)

International career
1967	Yugoslavia	1	(0)

Managerial career
- 1982–1984: Hajduk Split
- 1985–1986: Šibenik
- 1988–1989: Hajduk Split
- 1992: Bizertin
- 1995–1996: Olimpija Ljubljana
- 2000: Hajduk Split
- 2004: Hajduk Split
- 2004: Cerezo Osaka
- * Club domestic league appearances and goals

Petar Nadoveza (9 April 1942 – 19 March 2023) was a Croatian professional football player and manager. During his playing spell at Hajduk he was nicknamed "Pere, splitski Pele" which meant "Pete, the Pelé from Split".

== Playing career ==
=== Šibenik ===
Nadoveza started his youth and senior career at HNK Šibenik. In Šibenik's youth academy he was under the guidance of Stojan Mileta who created a lot of talented footballers from that region. At that time Slavko Luštica was the manager of Šibenik and with him Šibenik was a fierce club in the Yugoslav Second League.

=== Hajduk Split ===
In 1963 Nadoveza moved to Hajduk Split where he would spend the next ten years of his career. He was a real "killer" on the field. He had amazing speed and a real instinct for the goal. Nadoveza was not a very disciplined player which resulted in many arguments with his managers, especially with Branko Zebec but on the pitch he showed his commitment to the club and to the game. He was loved by the fans and the club personnel. His famous incident was in 1964 when he assaulted a football referee called Strmčeg. This resulted in a six-month ban from playing football.

During the 1960s Hajduk was not doing so well in the Yugoslav First League and many times they were facing relegation to the second league. In the 1965–66 Yugoslav First League Hajduk was accused of match fixing and was facing relegation. The match fixing case was dropped but Hajduk was still facing relegation in the league. Thanks to Nadoveza who scored 21 goals that season Hajduk was saved and managed to stay in the first league. Nadoveza became the top goalscorer that season. In 1967, he helped Hajduk win their first Yugoslav Cup. He played in the 1967–68 European Cup Winners' Cup which was Hajduk's first real participation in a UEFA competition.

At the end of the 1960s many young talented players such as Jerković, Džoni and Mužinić joined the club and alongside the "old guard" with Nadoveza they managed to create a new Hajduk. Their first success was the 1970–71 Yugoslav First League which they won dramatically. The most famous game that season was against FK Partizan in Belgrade where Hajduk needed 2 points to secure the trophy. Hajduk was losing 0–3 but in the second half Nadoveza managed to score two goals and motivate his team to turn the result around. Hajduk won the game 4–3 and secured the championship. Nadoveza also became the top goalscorer that season with 20 goals. Nadoveza won his second Yugoslav Cup in 1972. In his last season for the club he won his third Yugoslav Cup and helped Hajduk reach the 1972–73 European Cup Winners' Cup semi-final where they lost to Leeds United.

In 1973, after ten years with Hajduk, he left the club and went to play for Lokeren. Nadoveza made 460 appearances for Hajduk in which he scored 296 goals which makes him the 5th best goalscorer in Hajduk history. He retired in 1975.

=== International ===
Nadoveza made his debut for Yugoslavia in a May 1967 European qualification match away against Albania, his sole international appearance.

== Managerial career ==
Nadoveza started his managerial career at Hajduk Split in 1982. During his 2-year spell as manager there he won the Yugoslav Cup in 1984, finished second in the 1982–83 Yugoslav First League and made his way to the 1983–84 UEFA Cup semi-final where he was kicked out by Tottenham after a 2–2 aggregate. In 1996, he won the Slovenian Cup with Olimpija.

In 2000, he started his third stint with Hajduk and won the Croatian Cup where his team defeated Hajduk's biggest rivals Dinamo Zagreb. In 2003, he went to the HNK Hajduk Split Academy where he worked with youngsters. In May 2004, he replaced Zoran Vulić on the Hajduk seat 3 rounds before the end of the season. He managed to secure stability and morale in the team and so he won the 2003–04 Prva HNL. In July 2004, he became Hajduk's Academy director. In 2006, he also worked as the sporting director at Hajduk.

== Death ==
Nadoveza died on 19 March 2023, 20 days before his 81st birthday.

== Honours ==
=== Player ===
Hajduk Split

- Yugoslav First League: 1970–71
- Yugoslav Cup: 1966–67, 1971–72, 1972–73

=== Manager ===
Hajduk Split

- Croatian First League: 2003–04
- Yugoslav Cup: 1983–84
- Croatian Cup: 1999–2000

Olimpija Ljubljana

- Slovenian Cup: 1996
