= Nenad Cvetković (footballer, born 1948) =

Serbian football manager and player

Personal information
- Date of birth: 29 December 1948 (age 77)
- Place of birth: Niš, PR Serbia, FPR Yugoslavia
- Position: Striker

Youth career
- Radnički Niš

Senior career*
Years	Team	Apps	(Gls)
1967–1972	Radnički Niš	162	(58)
1972–1975	Partizan	46	(12)
1976–1977	Radnički Niš	26	(7)
Total		234	(77)

Managerial career
- 1991: Radnički Niš
- 1996: Radnički Niš
- * Club domestic league appearances and goals

Nenad Cvetković (Serbian Cyrillic: Ненад Цветковић; born 29 December 1948) is a Serbian former football manager and player.

== Playing career ==
Cvetković started out at Radnički Niš, making his debut in the 1966–67 Yugoslav First League. He scored 58 goals in 162 appearances over his six seasons with the club, before transferring to Partizan in 1972.

== Managerial career ==
Cvetković served as manager of Radnički Niš on two occasions in the 1990s. He also worked in Gabon, Kuwait, Bahrain, and Cyprus.
