= Miroslav Bošković =

Serbian footballer (1947–2023)

Personal information
- Date of birth: 3 January 1947
- Place of birth: Belgrade, PR Serbia, Yugoslavia
- Date of death: 17 August 2023 (aged 76)
- Place of death: Danilovgrad, Montenegro
- Position: Defender

Senior career*
Years	Team	Apps	(Gls)
1964–1965	Zadar		
1965–1973	Hajduk Split	175	(11)
1973–1975	Partizan	37	(4)
1975–1978	Angers	62	(4)
1978–1979	Sinđelić Beograd		

International career
1968–1972	Yugoslavia	6	(0)
- * Club domestic league appearances and goals

Miroslav Bošković (Serbian Cyrillic: Мирослав Бошковић; 3 January 1947 – 17 August 2023) was a Serbian footballer who played as a defender. He was capped six times for the Yugoslavia national team.

== Club career ==
Nicknamed "Galeb", he began his career playing in NK Zadar from where he moved to HNK Hajduk Split. In 1973, he signed with FK Partizan and two years later he moved to France to play with Angers SCO. He also worked two years as sports correspondent from France for Slobodna Dalmacija before returning to Yugoslavia and finishing his career playing with FK Sinđelić Beograd.

== International career ==
Bošković made his debut for Yugoslavia in a June 1968 friendly match against Brazil, coming on as a 67th-minute substitute for Miroslav Pavlović, and earned a total of 6 caps (no goals). His final international was a July 1972 friendly against Argentina.

== Death ==
Miroslav Bošković died on 17 August 2023, at the age of 76.

== Honours ==
Hajduk Split

- Yugoslav Cup: 1966–67
