= Svemir Đorđić =

Yugoslav footballer

Personal information
- Full name: Svemir Đorđić
- Date of birth: 16 May 1948 (age 78)
- Place of birth: Čepin, FPR Yugoslavia
- Height: 1.82 m (6 ft 0 in)
- Position: Midfielder

Youth career
- Proleter Osijek

Senior career*
Years	Team	Apps	(Gls)
1966–1968	Vojvodina	42	(6)
1968–1976	Partizan	186	(32)
1976–1978	Sion	47	(14)
1978–1979	Lausanne	25	(1)
1981–1982	Monthey		
Total		300	(53)

Managerial career
- Monthey
- * Club domestic league appearances and goals

Svemir Đorđić (Serbian Cyrillic: Свемир Ђорђић; born 16 May 1948) is a Yugoslav former footballer who played as a midfielder.

== Career ==
After spending two seasons with Vojvodina, Đorđić was transferred to Partizan in 1968. He remained with the club for eight years, making 186 league appearances and scoring 32 goals. In 1976, Đorđić moved abroad to Switzerland and played for two seasons with Sion. He would also play for fellow Swiss clubs Lausanne and Monthey.

== Honours ==
Partizan

- Yugoslav First League: 1975–76
