= Nenad Bjeković =

Serbian football administrator, manager and player

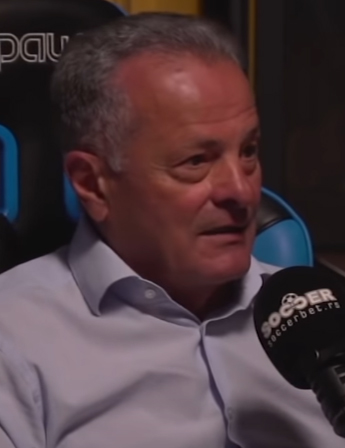
- Bjeković in 2021

Personal information
- Full name: Nenad Bjeković
- Date of birth: 5 November 1947 (age 78)
- Place of birth: Zrenjanin, PR Serbia, FPR Yugoslavia
- Height: 1.78 m (5 ft 10 in)
- Position: Forward

Youth career
- Zadrugar Lazarevo

Senior career*
Years	Team	Apps	(Gls)
1965–1969	Proleter Zrenjanin	103	(27)
1969–1976	Partizan	198	(82)
1976–1981	Nice	143	(85)
Total		444	(194)

International career
1968–1976	Yugoslavia	22	(4)

Managerial career
- 1982–1984: Partizan (assistant)
- 1984–1987: Partizan
- 1987–1989: Nice
- 1990: Partizan
- * Club domestic league appearances and goals

Nenad Bjeković (Serbian Cyrillic: Ненад Бјековић, pronounced [něnad bjêːkoʋitɕ]; born 5 November 1947) is a Serbian football administrator, and former manager and player.

A forward, Bjeković enjoyed a successful career and scored over 200 competitive goals at club level, mostly for Partizan and Nice during the 1970s. He was also capped for Yugoslavia internationally.

== Club career ==
Born in Lazarevo, a village near Zrenjanin, Bjeković started out at his local club Zadrugar Lazarevo, before switching to Proleter Zrenjanin. He stayed there for four years, making his Yugoslav First League debut in the 1967–68 season.

In July 1969, Bjeković was transferred to Partizan, penning a four-year contract. He spent seven seasons with the Crno-beli, netting 82 league goals in 198 appearances. In the 1975–76 season, Bjeković was the Yugoslav First League top scorer with 24 goals, helping Partizan win its seventh championship title.

In 1976, Bjeković moved abroad to France and signed with Nice. He played five seasons with Les Aiglons, tallying 85 goals in 143 league appearances. In 2013, Bjeković was named the club's player of the century.

== International career ==
At international level, Bjeković played 22 matches for Yugoslavia and netted four goals. He scored on his debut for the national team in a friendly match against Brazil in Belo Horizonte on 19 December 1968. His last cap came on 24 February 1976 in a 2–1 away friendly win over Algeria in Algiers.

== Post-playing career ==
After hanging up his boots, Bjeković started his managerial career as an assistant to Miloš Milutinović at Partizan in the summer of 1982. He would replace Milutinović as manager at the start of the 1984–85 season. At the helm of Partizan, Bjeković won back-to-back championship titles in 1986 and 1987.

In 1987, Bjeković was appointed as manager of his former club Nice. He was released after two years in charge. In April 1990, Bjeković returned to Partizan as manager to replace Ivan Golac, holding the post until the end of the season.

In June 1990, Bjeković was appointed as sporting director of Partizan. He served in the role for nearly two decades, during the presidential reign of Ivan Ćurković, before resigning from the position in May 2007.

In April 2018, Bjeković was elected as vice-president of the Serbian Football Association. He was appointed as acting president in May 2021, controversially replacing Marko Pantelić.

== Personal life ==
Bjeković is the father of fellow footballer Nenad Bjeković.

== Career statistics ==
=== Club ===
Appearances and goals by club, season and competition
Club	Season	League			Cup (Note: Includes Yugoslav Cup, Coupe de France)		Continental		Total	
Club	Season	Division	Apps	Goals	Apps	Goals	Apps	Goals	Apps	Goals
Proleter Zrenjanin	1965–66	Yugoslav Second League	21	7	—		—		21	7
Proleter Zrenjanin	1966–67	Yugoslav Second League	21	4			—		21	4
Proleter Zrenjanin	1967–68	Yugoslav First League	28	10			—		28	10
Proleter Zrenjanin	1968–69	Yugoslav First League	33	6			—		33	6
Proleter Zrenjanin	Total		103	27			—		103	27
Partizan	1969–70	Yugoslav First League	32	7	2	1	2 (Note: Appearances in Inter-Cities Fairs Cup)	0	36	8
Partizan	1970–71	Yugoslav First League	33	8	1	0	2	0	36	8
Partizan	1971–72	Yugoslav First League	33	14	2	1	—		35	15
Partizan	1972–73	Yugoslav First League	33	13	—		—		33	13
Partizan	1973–74	Yugoslav First League	32	14	2	2	—		34	16
Partizan	1974–75	Yugoslav First League	4	2	0	0	0	0	4	2
Partizan	1975–76	Yugoslav First League	31	24	1	0	—		32	24
Partizan	Total		198	82	8	4	4	0	210	86
Nice	1976–77	French Division 1	32	19	7	12	2 (Note: Appearances in UEFA Cup)	2	41	33
Nice	1977–78	French Division 1	35	29	10	6	—		45	35
Nice	1978–79	French Division 1	28	17	4	2	—		32	19
Nice	1979–80	French Division 1	35	15	4	1	—		39	16
Nice	1980–81	French Division 1	13	5	0	0	—		13	5
Nice	Total		143	85	25	21	2	2	170	108
Career total			444	194	33	25	6	2	483	221

=== International ===
Appearances and goals by national team and year
National team	Year	Apps	Goals
Yugoslavia	1968	1	1
Yugoslavia	1969	3	1
Yugoslavia	1970	0	0
Yugoslavia	1971	7	0
Yugoslavia	1972	3	0
Yugoslavia	1973	5	2
Yugoslavia	1974	1	0
Yugoslavia	1975	0	0
Yugoslavia	1976	2	0
Total		22	4

Yugoslavia score listed first, score column indicates score after each Bjeković goal

List of international goals scored by Nenad Bjeković
No.	Date	Venue	Opponent	Score	Result	Competition
1	19 December 1968	Belo Horizonte, Brazil	Brazil	2–0	2–3	Friendly
2	26 February 1969	Split, Yugoslavia	Sweden	1–0	2–1	Friendly
3	13 May 1973	Warsaw, Poland	Poland	2–1	2–2	Friendly
4	26 September 1973	Belgrade, Yugoslavia	Hungary	1–0	1–1	Friendly

== Honours ==
=== Player ===
Proleter Zrenjanin

- Yugoslav Second League: 1966–67 (Group East)

Partizan

- Yugoslav First League: 1975–76

Individual

- Yugoslav First League top scorer: 1975–76

=== Manager ===
Partizan

- Yugoslav First League: 1985–86, 1986–87
