= Borivoje Đorđević =

Serbian footballer

Personal information
- Date of birth: 2 August 1948 (age 78)
- Place of birth: Belgrade, FPR Yugoslavia
- Position: Midfielder

Senior career*
| Years | Team | Apps | (Gls) |
| 1965–1975 | Partizan | 194 | (29) |
| 1975–1978 | Panathinaikos | 36 | (5) |
| 1978–1980 | Eintracht Trier | 52 | (8) |
| Total | | 282 | (42) |

International career
| 1967–1971 | Yugoslavia | 9 | (0) |
Medal record
Men's Football
Representing Yugoslavia
European Championship
| Silver medal – second place | 1968 Italy | Team |
- * Club domestic league appearances and goals

Borivoje Đorđević (Serbian Cyrillic: Боривоје Ђорђевић; born 2 August 1948) is a Serbian former professional footballer who played as a midfielder.

== Club career ==
While playing in Partizan, Đorđević was known for his excellent assists and as an extraordinary playmaker. For a full decade there, he played a total of 322 matches and scored 50 goals. Afterwards, he decided to play the rest of his career abroad. First, he played for Panathinaikos from 1975 to 1978 winning the Greek championship, the Greek cup in 1977 and the Balkan cup, and then, he opted to play in German club Eintracht Trier where he finished his playing career in 1980.

== International career ==
Đorđević played for the Yugoslavia national team in all its youth levels and, in all but the seniors, archived to be the team captain. He played for the Yugoslavia senior national team nine matches, and his highest moment was the participation at UEFA Euro 1968. His debut was on 12 November 1967 in Belgrade against Albania (a 4–0 win) and his last match was on 21 April 1971, in Novi Sad, in a friendly against Romania (1–0 loss).

== Honours ==
Partizan

- European Cup runner-up: 1965–66

Panathinaikos

- Alpha Ethniki: 1976–77
- Greek Cup: 1976–77
- Balkans Cup: 1977

Yugoslavia

- UEFA European Championship: 1968
