= Miodrag Živaljević =

Serbian footballer (born 1951)

Personal information
- Date of birth: 9 September 1951 (age 75)
- Place of birth: Kragujevac, SFR Yugoslavia
- Height: 1.85 m (6 ft 1 in)
- Position: Forward

Youth career
- Radnički Kragujevac

Senior career*
| Years | Team | Apps | (Gls) |
| 1969–1975 | Partizan | 131 | (20) |
| 1976 | Spartak Subotica | | |
| 1977–1979 | 1. FC Nürnberg | 66 | (14) |
| 1979–1980 | Lyon | 28 | (4) |
| 1980–1981 | Rennes | 15 | (4) |
| 1981–1982 | Anorthosis | 5 | (0) |
| 1983 | New York Arrows (indoor) | 5 | (0) |
| 1983–1984 | Jacksonville Tea Men | 20 | (16) |
| 1984 | Kansas City Comets (indoor) | 1 | (0) |
- Jacksonville Tea Men
- * Club domestic league appearances and goals

Miodrag Živaljević (Serbin Cyrillic: Миодраг Живаљевић; born 9 September 1951) is a Serbian retired footballer who played as a forward in former Yugoslavia, as well as then-West Germany, France and the United States.

Micky (as he was dubbed in the English-speaking world) scored the only goal in the final American Soccer League championship game in 1983, as his Jacksonville Tea Men defeated the Pennsylvania Stoners, 1–0.

After retiring as a player Živaljević worked as a taxi driver in the USA before returning to Serbia in 2013.
