= Omladinski Stadium =

Stadium in Belgrade, Serbia

Coordinates: 44°48′55.64″N 20°29′38.57″E

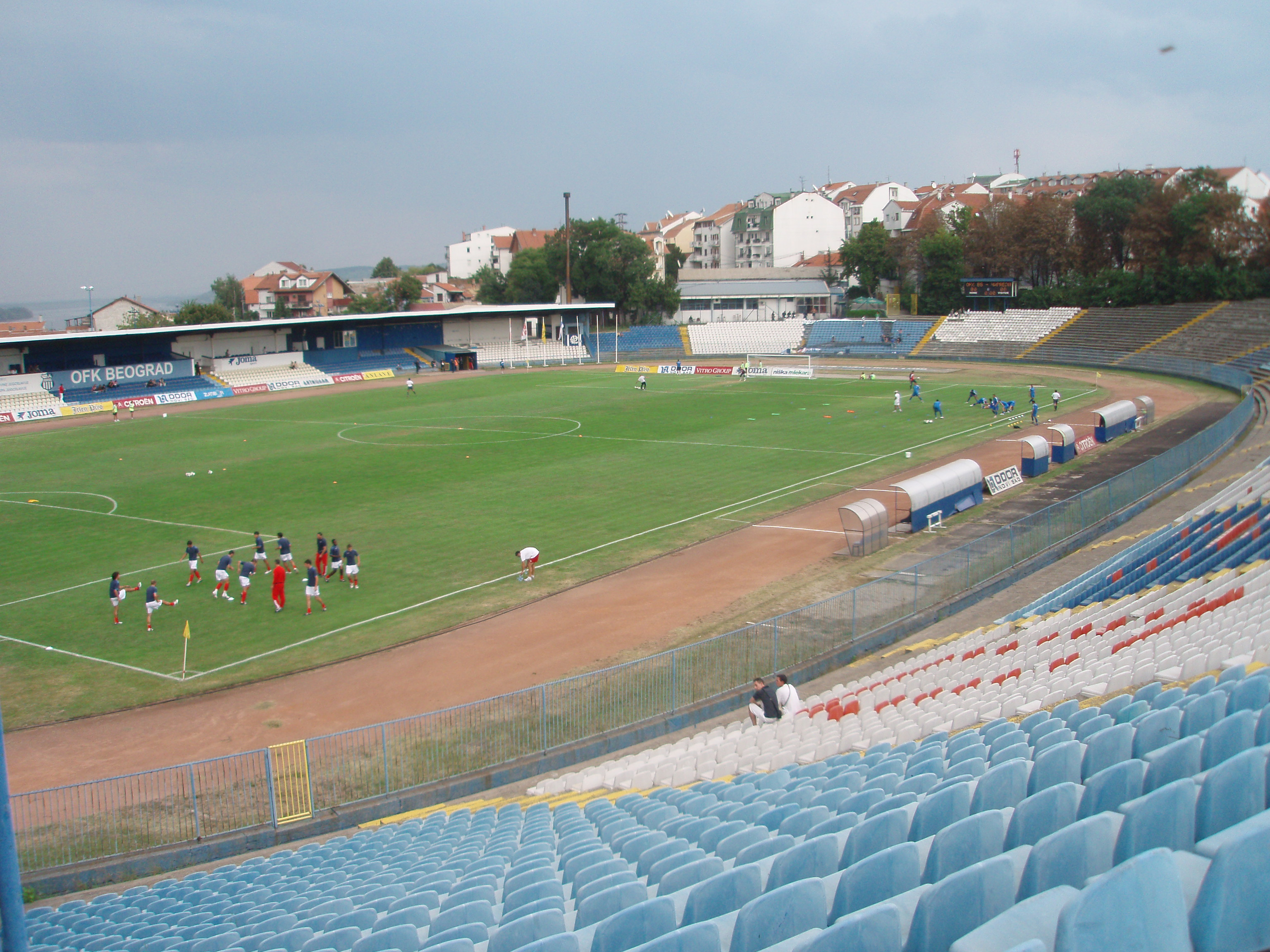
- Omladinski stadion na Karaburmi

- Location within Belgrade
- Full name: Omladinski stadion
- Location: Karaburma, Belgrade
- Owner: OFK Beograd
- Operator: OFK Beograd
- Capacity: 19,100; 10,600 (seats)
- Surface: Grass
- Record attendance: 45,000 (OFK Beograd vs Twente, 7 March 1973)
- Field size: 105 x 70 meters

Construction
- Built: 1957
- Opened: 10 August 1957; 69 years ago
- Renovated: 2025–2026

Tenants
- OFK Beograd (1957–present); BSK Borča (2009–2011)

Omladinski Stadium (Serbian Cyrillic: Омладински стадион, lit. 'Youth's Stadium') is a multi-purpose stadium in Belgrade, Serbia. It is currently used mostly for football matches and is the home ground of OFK Beograd. The stadium is capable of taking up to 19,100 people, but has a total of 10,600 seats. As of December 2012, the stadium is in deteriorating condition and can only hold a third of its intended capacity.

It was built by a firm Sportprojekt and its main architect was Karlo Kacl, with his assistants Kosta Popović and Aleksandar Radovanović.

== Gallery ==
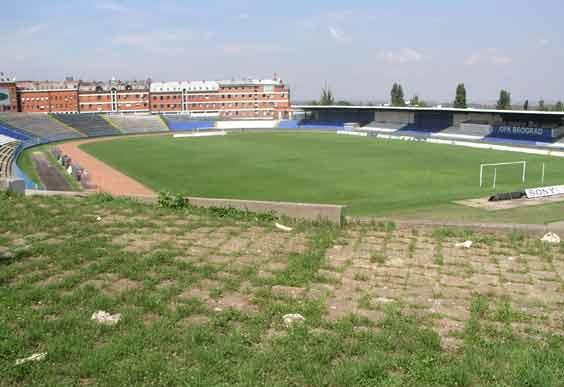
View on Omladinski Stadium from the southeastern corner (outside the stadium), October 2006

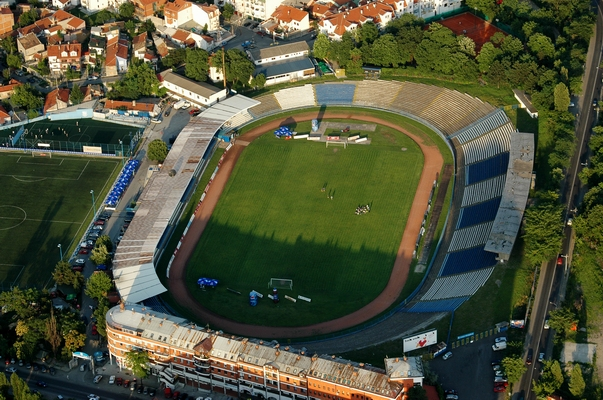
An aerial view of Omladinski Stadium, April 2008

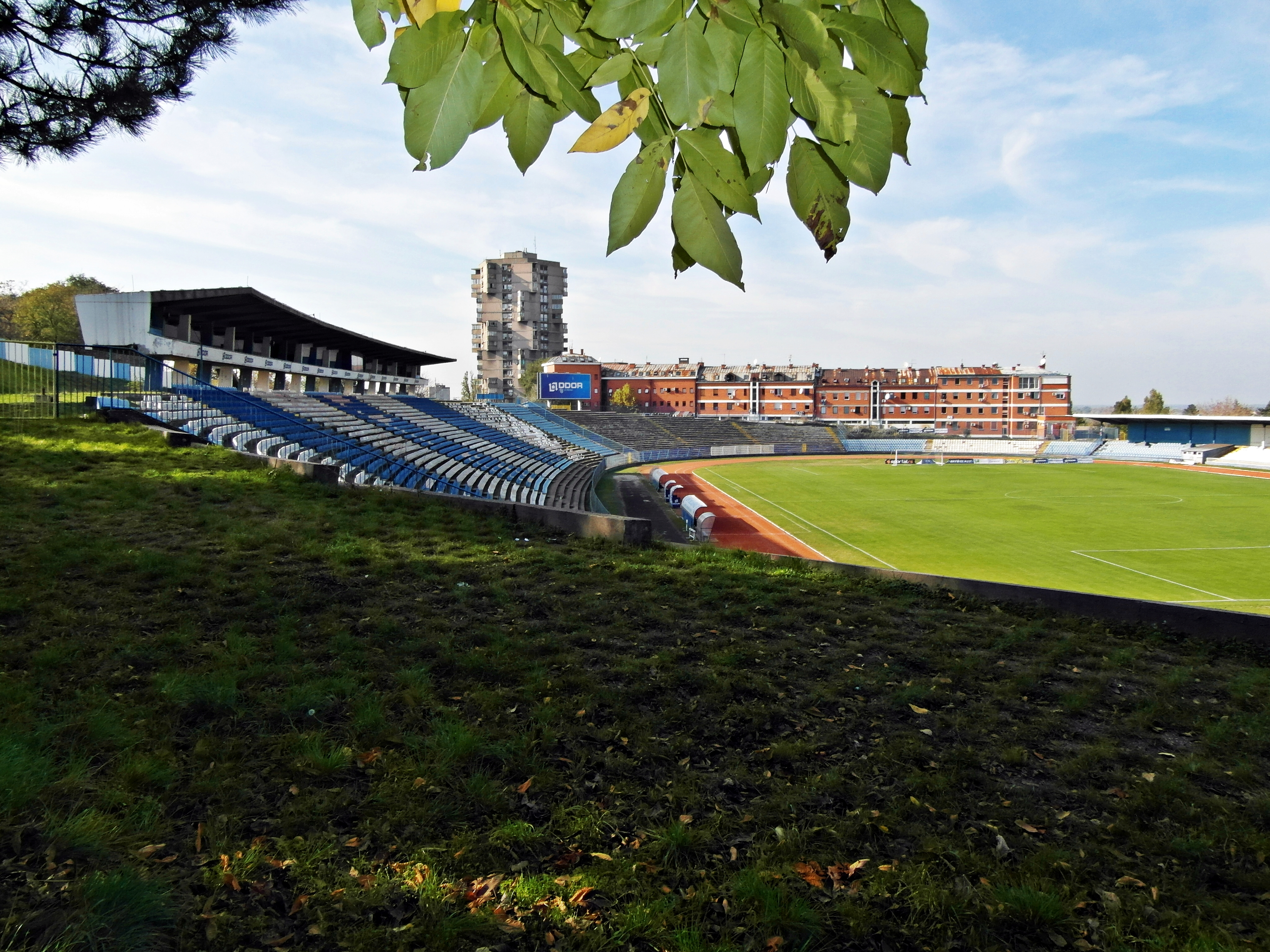
View on south stand from the southeastern corner (outside the stadium), November 2013

== See also ==
- List of football stadiums in Serbia
