= HNK Hajduk Split statistics and records =

Hrvatski nogometni klub Hajduk Split is a Croatian football club founded based in the city of Split, that competes in Prva HNL, top football league in the country. The club was founded on 13 February 1911. in Prague, and played its first competitive match on 11 June 1911 against Calcio Spalato, winning 9–0. The first to score for Hajduk was Šime Raunig. The first official game was played on 28 March 1920 in Split Championship against Borac Split, winning 8–0. This article lists various records and statistics related to the club and individual players and managers.

All records and statistics are accurate as of 21 September 2024

== Individual records and statistics ==
Current players and manager are in bold/italics.

=== Appearances ===
- Most appearances:
  - All fixtures – **739**, (Kingdom of Yugoslavia) (Socialist Federal Republic of Yugoslavia) Frane Matošić (1935–39, 1940–41, 1944–55).
  - Official matches – **390**, (Socialist Federal Republic of Yugoslavia) Vedran Rožić (1972–84).
  - In Yugoslav First League – **310**, (Socialist Federal Republic of Yugoslavia) Ivica Hlevnjak (1962–73).
  - In Prva HNL – **199**, (Croatia) Srđan Andrić (1999–2004, 2007–12).
  - In football cups – **44**, (Socialist Federal Republic of Yugoslavia) (Croatia) Ante Miše (1985–94, 1997–2003).
  - In European competitions – **49**, (Socialist Federal Republic of Yugoslavia) Vedran Rožić (1972–84).
  - Foreign player with most appearances in all competitions – **214**, (Australia) Josip Skoko (1995–99, 2008–10).
- Most appearances in one season:
  - All official matches – **49**, (Socialist Federal Republic of Yugoslavia) Vedran Rožić (1983–84).
  - All official matches (1992–) – **46**, (Bosnia and Herzegovina) Mirsad Hibić (1994–95).
  - In Yugoslav First League – **34**, (Socialist Federal Republic of Yugoslavia) Ivica Hlevnjak (1968–69, 1970–71), (Socialist Federal Republic of Yugoslavia) Dragan Holcer (1968–69), (Socialist Federal Republic of Yugoslavia) Vilson Džoni (1971–72), (Socialist Federal Republic of Yugoslavia) Ivica Šurjak (1973–74),
    (Socialist Federal Republic of Yugoslavia) Ivan Buljan (1974–75), (Socialist Federal Republic of Yugoslavia) Nenad Šalov, (Socialist Federal Republic of Yugoslavia) Boro Primorac (1980–81), (Socialist Federal Republic of Yugoslavia) Zlatko Vujović (1984–85), (Socialist Federal Republic of Yugoslavia) Dragutin Čelić (1987–88).
  - In Prva HNL – **34**, (Croatia) Goran Milović (2013–14), (Croatia) Marko Livaja (2021–22).
  - In Yugoslav Cup – **8**, (Socialist Federal Republic of Yugoslavia) Dragutin Čelić (1986–87, 1989–90), (Socialist Federal Republic of Yugoslavia) Stipe Andrijašević, (Socialist Federal Republic of Yugoslavia) Dragi Setinov, (Socialist Federal Republic of Yugoslavia) Jerko Tipurić (1986–87), (Socialist Federal Republic of Yugoslavia) Nikola Jerkan (1989–90),
    (Croatia) Robert Jarni (1990–91).
  - In Croatian Cup – **9**, (Croatia) Ante Miše (1992–93) and (Croatia) Nenad Pralija (1994–95).
  - In European competitions – **10**, (Socialist Federal Republic of Yugoslavia) Vedran Rožić and (Socialist Federal Republic of Yugoslavia) Zoran Simović (1983–84), (Croatia) Aljoša Asanović (1994–95), (Bosnia and Herzegovina) Senijad Ibričić and (Croatia) Jurica Buljat (2010–11).
- Numerous seasons appearances:
  - Longest-serving player – **11 years, 6 months and 25 days**, (Socialist Federal Republic of Yugoslavia) Vedran Rožić (from 5 November 1972 to 30 May 1984).
  - Most major trophies with Hajduk Split – **10**, (Socialist Federal Republic of Yugoslavia) Luka Peruzović.

==== Other records in the Croatian First Football League ====
- Youngest player – **16 years, 0 month, 2 days**, (Croatia) Luka Vušković (26 February 2023 v Dinamo).
- Oldest player – **37 years, 7 months, 11 days**, (Croatia) Vladimir Balić (10 May 2008 v Zagreb).
- Oldest débutante – **36 years, 3 months, 5 days**, (Croatia) Đovani Roso (22 February 2009 v Dinamo).
- Most substituted player – **53**, (Croatia) Srđan Andrić (1999–2004, 2007–12).
- Most substituted player (one season) – **18**, (Croatia) Ante Erceg (2016–17).
- Most used substitute – **57**, (Croatia) Zvonimir Deranja (1996–2004, 2005–06).
- Most used substitute (one season) – **19**, (Croatia) Mirko Oremuš (2008–09).
- Appearances in most seasons – **10**, (Croatia) Tomislav Erceg (1991–95, 1997–98, 1999–2000, 2001–02, 2006), (Croatia) Vik Lalić (1993–2001, 2002–03),
  (Croatia) Srđan Andrić (1999–2004, 2007–12).

==== Other records in the European competitions ====
- Youngest player – **16 years, 9 month, 13 days**, (Croatia) Nikola Vlašić (17 July 2014 v Dundalk F.C.).
- Oldest player (since 1992) – **36 years, 10 months, 17 days**, (Croatia) Tonči Gabrić (28 September 1998 v ACF Fiorentina) and
  (Croatia) Vladimir Balić (16 August 2008 v U.C. Sampdoria).

=== Most appearances ===
	Name	Years	Signed from	League	Cup	Europe	Other	Total
1	(Socialist Federal Republic of Yugoslavia) Vedran Rožić	1972–84	Youth Academy	305	36	49	0	390
2	(Socialist Federal Republic of Yugoslavia) Ivica Hlevnjak	1962–73	Youth Academy	310	36	27	0	373
3	(Socialist Federal Republic of Yugoslavia) Dražen Mužinić	1971–80	Youth Academy	280	29	36	0	345
4	(Socialist Federal Republic of Yugoslavia) Ivica Šurjak	1971–81	Youth Academy	268	28	36	0	332
5	(Socialist Federal Republic of Yugoslavia) Jurica Jerković	1969–78	Youth Academy	250	29	32	0	311
6	(Kingdom of Yugoslavia) (Socialist Federal Republic of Yugoslavia) Frane Matošić	1935–39, 1940–41, 1944–55	Youth Academy	270	28	2	9	309
7	(Socialist Federal Republic of Yugoslavia) Luka Peruzović	1969–80, 1983–84	Youth Academy	244	26	36	0	306
8	(Socialist Federal Republic of Yugoslavia) Bernard Vukas	1947–57, 1959–63	NK Zagreb	267	33	4	0	304
9	(Socialist Federal Republic of Yugoslavia) (Croatia) Ante Miše	1985–94, 1997–2003	NK Borovo	226	44	26	1	297
10	(Socialist Federal Republic of Yugoslavia) Zlatko Vujović	1976–86	Youth Academy	240	15	35	0	290

Sources: rsssf.com, hrnogomet.com

=== Goals ===
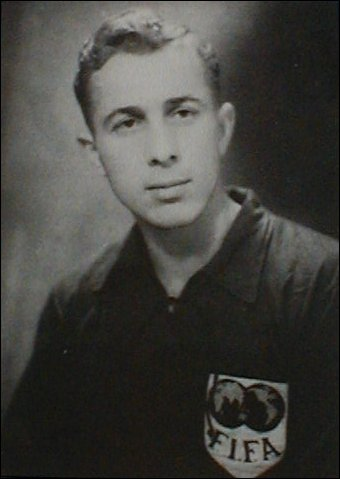
Bernard Vukas scored 300 goals for Hajduk Split. He is remembered as one of the best Hajduk players ever

- Most goals:
  - In all competitions – **211**, (Kingdom of Yugoslavia) (Socialist Federal Republic of Yugoslavia) Frane Matošić (1935–39, 1940–41, 1944–55).
  - In league matches – **190**, (Kingdom of Yugoslavia) (Socialist Federal Republic of Yugoslavia) Frane Matošić (1935–39, 1940–41, 1944–55).
  - In Yugoslav First League – **179**, (Kingdom of Yugoslavia) (Socialist Federal Republic of Yugoslavia) Frane Matošić (1935–39, 1940–41, 1944–55).
  - In Prva HNL – **93** (Croatia) **Marko Livaja** (2021-present).
  - In Yugoslav Cup – **21**, (Kingdom of Yugoslavia) (Socialist Federal Republic of Yugoslavia) Frane Matošić (1935–39, 1940–41, 1944–55).
  - In Croatian Cup – **21**, (Croatia) Tomislav Erceg (1991–95, 1997–98, 1999–2000, 2001–02, 2006).
  - In European competitions – **19**, (Socialist Federal Republic of Yugoslavia) Zlatko Vujović (1976–86).
- Most goals in one season:
  - All official matches – **34**, (Kingdom of Yugoslavia) Leo Lemešić (1934–35).
  - All official matches (1992–) – **32**, (Croatia) **Marko Livaja** (2021–22).
  - In Yugoslav First League – **26**, (Kingdom of Yugoslavia) Leo Lemešić (1934–35).
  - In Prva HNL – **28**, (Croatia) **Marko Livaja** (2021–2022).
  - In Yugoslav Cup – **10**, (Kingdom of Yugoslavia) Vladimir Kragić (1934); (Socialist Federal Republic of Yugoslavia) Stjepan Deverić (1986–87).
  - In Croatian Cup – **9**, (Croatia) Nikola Kalinić (2007–08). (Note: During the 1940–41 season Ratko Kacijan scored 10 goals in Croatian Football Cup played before Yugoslav Cup was reestablished.)
  - In European competitions – **8**, (Socialist Federal Republic of Yugoslavia) Zlatko Vujović (1985–1986).
- Most goals in one match:
  - In domestic league – **6**, (Kingdom of Yugoslavia) Leo Lemešić (12 May 1935 v FK Slavija), (Kingdom of Yugoslavia) Ratko Kacijan (2 February 1941 v FK Bačka).
  - In domestic cup – **6**, (Croatia) Duje Čop (21 October 2010 v Rudar 47).
  - In European competitions – **4**, (Socialist Federal Republic of Yugoslavia) Slaviša Žungul (19 September 1974 v Keflavík); (Socialist Federal Republic of Yugoslavia) Zlatko Vujović (18 September 1985 v Metz).
- Oldest goalscorer – **37 years and 1 day**, (Socialist Federal Republic of Yugoslavia) Frane Matošić, (26 November 1955 v FK Velež).
- Foreign player with most goals in all competitions – **49**, (Bosnia and Herzegovina) Senijad Ibričić (2008–11).

==== Other goalscoring records in the Croatian First Football League ====
- Youngest goalscorer – **16 years, 9 months 29 days**, (Croatia) Bruno Durdov (21 September 2024 v Velika Gorica).
- Oldest goalscorer – **34 years, 5 months, 20 days**, (Bosnia and Herzegovina) Almir Turković (23 April 2005 v Inter Zaprešić).
- Scored in most consecutive matches – **5**, (Croatia) Ardian Kozniku (1992), (Croatia) Tomislav Bušić (2004–05), (Croatia) **Marko Livaja** (2020–21), (2021–22), (2024–25)
- Scored in most seasons – **8**, (Croatia) Mijo Caktaš (2011–16, 2018–2021).
- Most goals in a game – **4**, (Croatia) Tomislav Erceg (14 October 1994 v Belišće), (Hungary) Márkó Futács (20 May 2017 v Inter Zaprešić).
- Most goals scored as a substitute – **18**, (Croatia) Zvonimir Deranja (1996–2004, 2005–06).
- Most goals scored as a substitute (one season) – **8**, (Croatia) Zvonimir Deranja (1998–99).
- Fastest goal – **15 seconds**, (Ivory Coast) Jean Evrard Kouassi (10 August 2014 v Lokomotiva).
- Most hat-tricks – **3**, (Croatia) Tomislav Erceg (1991–95, 1997–98, 1999–2000, 2001–02, 2006).
- Fastest hat-trick – **8 minutes**, (Croatia) Tomislav Erceg (4 September 1993 v Pazinka).
- Fastest four goals – **51 minute**, (Hungary) Márkó Futács (20 May 2017 v Inter Zaprešić).
- Most converted penalties – **32**, (Croatia) **Marko Livaja** (2021–present).

==== Other goalscoring records in European competitions ====
- Youngest goalscorer – **16 years, 9 months and 13 days**, (Croatia) Nikola Vlašić (17 July 2014 v Dundalk F.C.).
- Oldest goalscorer (since 1992) – **33 years, 8 months and 23 days**, (Croatia) Dean Računica (28 August 2003 v FC Haka).

==== Landmarks ====
- First goal:
  - Overall – (Austria-Hungary) Šime Raunig (11 June 1911 v Calcio Spalato).
  - In Yugoslav First League – (Kingdom of Yugoslavia) Mirko Machiedo (2 September 1923 v SAŠK).
  - In Prva HNL – (Croatia) Ardian Kozniku (29 February 1992 v Istra).
  - In Croatian Cup – (Croatia) Joško Jeličić (7 April 1992 v Rijeka).
  - In European competitions – (Kingdom of Yugoslavia) Mirko Bonačić (14 August 1927 v Rapid Vienna).
  - On Poljud stadium – (Socialist Federal Republic of Yugoslavia) Boro Primorac (19 September 1979 v Trabzonspor B.K.).
- Last goal:
  - In Yugoslav First League – (Socialist Federal Republic of Yugoslavia) Ivica Mornar (16 June 1991 v Proleter).
  - In Yugoslav Cup – (Socialist Federal Republic of Yugoslavia) Alen Bokšić (8 May 1991 v Red Star).
  - On Stari plac stadium – (Socialist Federal Republic of Yugoslavia) Mišo Krstičević (5 September 1979 v Dinamo).
- Landmark goals:
  - 1000th – (Socialist Federal Republic of Yugoslavia) Vlado Schönauer (12 September 1954 v Proleter Osijek).
  - 2000th – (Socialist Federal Republic of Yugoslavia) Slaviša Žungul (2 September 1976 v Željezničar).
  - 3000th – (Croatia) Nenad Pralija (18 August 1995 v Segesta).
  - 4000th – (Ivory Coast) Jean Evrard Kouassi (21 April 2013 v Slaven Belupo).

=== Top goalscorers ===
	Name	Years	Signed from	League	Cup	Europe	Other	Total
1	(Kingdom of Yugoslavia) (Socialist Federal Republic of Yugoslavia) Frane Matošić	1935–39, 1940–41, 1944–55	Youth Academy	179	20	1	11	211
2	(Kingdom of Yugoslavia) Leo Lemešić	1924–40	Youth Academy	109	10	0	54	173
3	(Socialist Federal Republic of Yugoslavia) Petar Nadoveza	1963–73	NK Šibenik	107	10	6	0	123
4	(Socialist Federal Republic of Yugoslavia) Zlatko Vujović	1976–86	Youth Academy	100	2	19	0	121
5	(Kingdom of Yugoslavia) Vladimir Kragić	1929–39	Youth Academy	78	11	0	29	118
6	(Socialist Federal Republic of Yugoslavia) Slaviša Žungul	1971–78	Youth Academy	82	13	14	0	109
	(Croatia) Tomislav Erceg	1992–95, 1997–98, 1999–2000, 2001–02, 2006	Youth Academy	81	21	7	0	109
8	(Socialist Federal Republic of Yugoslavia) Bernard Vukas	1947–57, 1959–63	NK Zagreb	94	12	1	0	107
9	(Croatia) **Marko Livaja**	2021–	AEK Athens	93	12	1	0	106
10	(Kingdom of Yugoslavia) Ljubo Benčić	1921–35	Youth Academy	42	6	0	56	104

Sources: rsssf.com, hrnogomet.com

=== Goalkeeping ===
- Most appearances:
  - In Yugoslav First League – **181**, (Socialist Federal Republic of Yugoslavia) Radomir Vukčević (1963–73).
  - In Prva HNL – **165**, (Croatia) Lovre Kalinić (2009-2016, 2020-2025).
  - In Yugoslav Cup – **24**, (Socialist Federal Republic of Yugoslavia) Radomir Vukčević (1963–73).
  - In Croatian Cup – **31**, (Croatia) Stipe Pletikosa (1997–2003, 2005–06).
  - In European competitions – **24**, (Croatia) Tonči Gabrić (1987–88, 1994–99).
  - In all competitions – **221**, (Socialist Federal Republic of Yugoslavia) Radomir Vukčević (1963–73).
- Longest run without conceding a goal:
  - In Yugoslav First League – **789 minutes**, (Socialist Federal Republic of Yugoslavia) Rizah Mešković (1973–74). Also an overall record in Yugoslav First League.
  - In Prva HNL – **776 minutes**, (Croatia) Lovre Kalinić (2015–16).
- Most clean sheets:
  - In Yugoslav First League – **57** in 181 apps, (Socialist Federal Republic of Yugoslavia) Radomir Vukčević (1963–73).
  - In Prva HNL – **77** in 164 apps, (Croatia) Stipe Pletikosa (1997–2003, 2005–06).
- Most clean sheets in one season:
  - In Yugoslav First League – **18** in 31 apps, (Socialist Federal Republic of Yugoslavia) Ivan Katalinić (1975–76).
  - In Prva HNL – **19** in 31 apps, (Croatia) Lovre Kalinić (2015–16).
- Most goals:
  - In all competitions – **16**, (Socialist Federal Republic of Yugoslavia) Ante Vulić (1951–62).

Sources: hrnogomet.com

=== Disciplinary ===
- Most yellow cards:
  - In Prva HNL – **49**, (Croatia) Srđan Andrić (1999–2004, 2007–12).
  - In Prva HNL (one season) – **12**, (Bosnia and Herzegovina) Dario Damjanović (2005–06), (Bosnia and Herzegovina) Boris Pandža (2008–09), (Croatia) Mario Maloča (2014–15).
  - In Croatian Cup – **10**, (Croatia) Ante Miše (1985–94, 1997–2003).
- Most red cards:
  - In Prva HNL – **6**, (Croatia) Ante Miše (1985–94, 1997–2003), (Croatia) Darijo Srna (1999–2003).
  - In Prva HNL (one season) – **3**, (Croatia) Saša Peršon (1992–93).
  - In Croatian Cup – **2**, (Croatia) Jurica Buljat (2005–11), (Croatia) Mladen Pelaić (2007–10).
- Most appearances without a card:
  - In Prva HNL – **35**, (Croatia) Stipe Andrijašević (1983–92, 1994–95).
  - In Croatian Cup – **31**, (Croatia) Stipe Pletikosa (1997–2003, 2005–06).

Sources: hrnogomet.com

=== International ===
- First capped player for Yugoslavia – (Kingdom of Yugoslavia) **Janko Rodin**, (Kingdom of Yugoslavia) **Mirko Kurir** (10 February 1924 v Australia).
- First capped player for Croatia – **Igor Štimac** (22 December 1990 v Romania).
- First Hajduk player to appear at FIFA World Cup – (Socialist Federal Republic of Yugoslavia) **Bernard Vukas** at 1950 FIFA World Cup (25 June 1950 v Switzerland).
- Most World Cup appearances while a Hajduk player – **6**, (Socialist Federal Republic of Yugoslavia) Ivan Buljan, (Socialist Federal Republic of Yugoslavia) Ivica Šurjak, for Yugoslavia in 1974.
- Most World Cup goals while a Hajduk player – **2**, (Socialist Federal Republic of Yugoslavia) Ivica Šurjak, for Yugoslavia in 1974.
- First Hajduk player to appear at UEFA European Championship – (Socialist Federal Republic of Yugoslavia) **Ante Žanetić** at 1960 European Nations' Cup (6 July 1960 v France).
- Most UEFA Championship appearances while a Hajduk player – **4**, Aljoša Asanović, for Croatia in 1996.
- Most UEFA Championship goals while a Hajduk player – **1**, (Socialist Federal Republic of Yugoslavia) Ante Žanetić, for Yugoslavia in 1960.
- Most caps with Yugoslavia while a Hajduk player – **59**, (Socialist Federal Republic of Yugoslavia) Bernard Vukas (1947–57, 1959–62).
- Most goals for Yugoslavia while a Hajduk player – **17**, (Socialist Federal Republic of Yugoslavia) Zlatko Vujović (1976–86).
- Most caps with Croatia while a Hajduk player – **36**, Stipe Pletikosa (1997–2003, 2005–06).
- Most goals for Croatia while a Hajduk player – **4**, Niko Kranjčar (2004–06), Marko Livaja (2021–23).
- Most caps with other national teams while a Hajduk player – **19**, (Bosnia and Herzegovina) Senijad Ibričić (2008–11).
- Most goals with other national teams while a Hajduk player – **3**, (Latvia) Maris Verpakovskis (2007–08).
- Most capped foreign players to play for Hajduk – **104**, Maris Verpakovskis with Latvia; **100**, (North Macedonia) Goce Sedloski with Macedonia; **57**, **Hugo Almeida** with Portugal;
  **56**, Ervin Bulku with Albania; **51**, Josip Skoko with Australia; **50**, Artem Milevskyi with Ukraine.

Sources: rsssf.com, hrnogomet.com, soccerway.com

=== Homegrown players with most appearances in national team ===
#	Name	Career	Apps
1	(Croatia) Ivan Perišić	2011-	157
2	(Croatia) Darijo Srna	2002–2016	134
3	(Croatia) Stipe Pletikosa	1999–2014	114
4	(Socialist Federal Republic of Yugoslavia) (Croatia) Robert Jarni	1990–2002	88
5	(Croatia) Mario Pašalić	2014-	87
6	(Socialist Federal Republic of Yugoslavia) Zlatko Vujović	1979-1990	70
7	(Socialist Federal Republic of Yugoslavia) (Croatia) Aljoša Asanović	1987–2000	65
	(Croatia) Nikola Vlašić	2017-	65
8	(Socialist Federal Republic of Yugoslavia) Vladimir Beara	1950–1959	60
9	(Croatia) Igor Tudor	1997–2006	55

=== Players that participated on international tournaments while playing for Hajduk ===
==== FIFA World Cup ====
- (Brazil) 1950 FIFA World Cup **5th place**
  - (Socialist Federal Republic of Yugoslavia) Vladimir Beara
  - (Socialist Federal Republic of Yugoslavia) Bernard Vukas
  - (Socialist Federal Republic of Yugoslavia) Ervin Katnić
  - (Socialist Federal Republic of Yugoslavia) Ivo Radovniković
  - (Socialist Federal Republic of Yugoslavia) Božo Broketa
- (Switzerland) 1954 FIFA World Cup **8th place**
  - (Socialist Federal Republic of Yugoslavia) Vladimir Beara
  - (Socialist Federal Republic of Yugoslavia) Bernard Vukas
  - (Socialist Federal Republic of Yugoslavia) Zlatko Papec
- (Sweden) 1958 FIFA World Cup **5th place**
  - (Socialist Federal Republic of Yugoslavia) Nikola Radović
- (Chile) 1962 FIFA World Cup **4th place**
  - (Socialist Federal Republic of Yugoslavia) Andrija Anković
- (West Germany) 1974 FIFA World Cup **7th place**
  - (Socialist Federal Republic of Yugoslavia) Dražen Mužinić
  - (Socialist Federal Republic of Yugoslavia) Ivan Buljan
  - (Socialist Federal Republic of Yugoslavia) Branko Oblak
  - (Socialist Federal Republic of Yugoslavia) Ivica Šurjak
  - (Socialist Federal Republic of Yugoslavia) Jurica Jerković
  - (Socialist Federal Republic of Yugoslavia) Luka Peruzović
  - (Socialist Federal Republic of Yugoslavia) Rizah Mešković
- (Spain) 1982 FIFA World Cup **16th place**
  - (Socialist Federal Republic of Yugoslavia) Ivan Gudelj
  - (Socialist Federal Republic of Yugoslavia) Zoran Vujović
  - (Socialist Federal Republic of Yugoslavia) Zlatko Vujović
  - (Socialist Federal Republic of Yugoslavia) Ivan Pudar
- (Italy) 1990 FIFA World Cup **5th place**
  - (Socialist Federal Republic of Yugoslavia) Alen Bokšić
  - (Socialist Federal Republic of Yugoslavia) Robert Jarni
- (France) 1998 FIFA World Cup **Bronze**
  - (Croatia) Anthony Šerić
  - (Croatia) Igor Tudor
- (Japan) (South Korea) 2002 FIFA World Cup **23rd place**
  - (Croatia) Stipe Pletikosa
- (Germany) 2006 FIFA World Cup **22nd place**
  - (Croatia) Niko Kranjčar
- (Brazil) 2014 FIFA World Cup **20th place**
  - (Bosnia and Herzegovina) Avdija Vršajević
  - (Bosnia and Herzegovina) Tino-Sven Sušić
- (Qatar) 2022 FIFA World Cup **Bronze**
  - (Croatia) Marko Livaja
- (Canada) (United States) (Mexico) 2022 FIFA World Cup **TBD**
  - (Canada) Niko Sigur

==== UEFA Euro ====
- (France) 1960 European Nations' Cup **Silver**
  - (Socialist Federal Republic of Yugoslavia) Ante Žanetić
- (Italy) UEFA Euro 1968 **Silver**
  - (Socialist Federal Republic of Yugoslavia) Dragan Holcer
  - (Socialist Federal Republic of Yugoslavia) Radomir Vukčević
- (Socialist Federal Republic of Yugoslavia) UEFA Euro 1976 **4th place**
  - (Socialist Federal Republic of Yugoslavia) Ivan Buljan
  - (Socialist Federal Republic of Yugoslavia) Dražen Mužinić
  - (Socialist Federal Republic of Yugoslavia) Ivica Šurjak
  - (Socialist Federal Republic of Yugoslavia) Jurica Jerković
  - (Socialist Federal Republic of Yugoslavia) Slaviša Žungul
  - (Socialist Federal Republic of Yugoslavia) Luka Peruzović
- (France) UEFA Euro 1984 **8th place**
  - (Socialist Federal Republic of Yugoslavia) Zoran Simović
  - (Socialist Federal Republic of Yugoslavia) Ivan Gudelj
  - (Socialist Federal Republic of Yugoslavia) Zlatko Vujović
  - (Socialist Federal Republic of Yugoslavia) Branko Miljuš
  - (Socialist Federal Republic of Yugoslavia) Josip Čop
- (England) UEFA Euro 1996 **7th place**
  - (Croatia) Aljoša Asanović
  - (Croatia) Tonči Gabrić
- (Portugal) UEFA Euro 2004 **13th place**
  - (Croatia) Mato Neretljak
- (Austria) (Switzerland) UEFA Euro 2008 **5th place**
  - (Croatia) Nikola Kalinić
- (France) UEFA Euro 2016 **9th place**
  - (Croatia) Lovre Kalinić
- (European Union) UEFA Euro 2020 **13th place**
  - (Croatia) Lovre Kalinić
- (Germany) UEFA Euro 2024 **20th place**
  - (Croatia) Ivan Perišić

==== Summer Olympics ====
- (Uruguay) Football at the 1928 Summer Olympics
  - (Kingdom of Yugoslavia) Ljubomir Benčić
  - (Kingdom of Yugoslavia) Mirko Bonačić
- (United Kingdom) Football at the 1948 Summer Olympics **Silver**
  - (Socialist Federal Republic of Yugoslavia) Bernard Vukas
  - (Socialist Federal Republic of Yugoslavia) Božo Broketa
  - (Socialist Federal Republic of Yugoslavia) Frane Matošić
- (Finland) Football at the 1952 Summer Olympics **Silver**
  - (Socialist Federal Republic of Yugoslavia) Bernard Vukas
  - (Socialist Federal Republic of Yugoslavia) Vladimir Beara
  - (Socialist Federal Republic of Yugoslavia) Slavko Luštica
- (Australia) Football at the 1956 Summer Olympics **Silver**
  - (Socialist Federal Republic of Yugoslavia) Zlatko Papec
  - (Socialist Federal Republic of Yugoslavia) Nikola Radović
  - (Socialist Federal Republic of Yugoslavia) Joško Vidošević
- (Italy) Football at the 1960 Summer Olympics **Gold**
  - (Socialist Federal Republic of Yugoslavia) Andrija Anković
  - (Socialist Federal Republic of Yugoslavia) Zvonko Bego
  - (Socialist Federal Republic of Yugoslavia) Aleksandar Kozlina
  - (Socialist Federal Republic of Yugoslavia) Ante Žanetić
- (Soviet Union) Football at the 1980 Summer Olympics **4th place**
  - (Socialist Federal Republic of Yugoslavia) Nikica Cukrov
  - (Socialist Federal Republic of Yugoslavia) Ivan Gudelj
  - (Socialist Federal Republic of Yugoslavia) Mišo Krstičević
  - (Socialist Federal Republic of Yugoslavia) Zoran Vujović
  - (Socialist Federal Republic of Yugoslavia) Zlatko Vujović
- (United States) Football at the 1984 Summer Olympics **Bronze**
  - (Socialist Federal Republic of Yugoslavia) Ivan Pudar
  - (Socialist Federal Republic of Yugoslavia) Branko Miljuš

==== Other ====
- (South Africa) 1996 African Cup of Nations **10th place** (Liberia ranking)
  - (Liberia) Mass Sarr, Jr.
- (Saudi Arabia) 1997 FIFA Confederations Cup **Silver** (Australia ranking)
  - (Australia) Josip Skoko
- 2023 Africa Cup of Nations **Gold** (Ivory Coast ranking)
  - (Ivory Coast) Ismael Diallo

Sources: rsssf.com, hrnogomet.com, soccerway.com

=== Managerial ===
- Most appearances for a manager:
  - In Yugoslav First League – **170**, (Socialist Federal Republic of Yugoslavia) Tomislav Ivić (1972, 1973–76, 1978–80, 1987).
  - In Prva HNL – **128**, (Croatia) Zoran Vulić (1998, 2000–01, 2002–04, 2006–07, 2018).
  - In Croatian Cup – **26**, (Croatia) Zoran Vulić (1998, 2000–01, 2002–04, 2006–07, 2018).
  - In European competitions – **24**, (Croatia) Ivan Katalinić (1993–95, 1998–99, 2004).
- Most wins for a manager:
  - In Yugoslav First League – **92** in 170 apps, (Socialist Federal Republic of Yugoslavia) Tomislav Ivić (1972, 1973–76, 1978–80, 1987).
  - In Prva HNL – **83** in 128 apps, (Croatia) Zoran Vulić (1998, 2000–01, 2002–04, 2006–07, 2018).
  - In Croatian Cup – **18** in 26 apps, (Croatia) Zoran Vulić (1998, 2000–01, 2002–04, 2006–07, 2018).
  - In European competitions – **8** in 24 apps, (Croatia) Ivan Katalinić (1993–95, 1998–99, 2004).
- Youngest manager in Prva HNL – **33 years, 2 months, 24 days**, (Croatia) Slaven Bilić (25 November 2001 v Osijek).
- Oldest manager in Prva HNL – **76 years, 11 months, 22 days**, (Croatia) Stanko Poklepović (11 April 2014 v Istra 1961).
- Longest-serving managers (per appointment) – **7 seasons**, (Kingdom of Yugoslavia) Luka Kaliterna (1923–30); (Kingdom of Yugoslavia) Ljubo Benčić (1941–48).

Sources: hrnogomet.hr, hajduk.hr, soccerway.com

=== Awards ===
==== Domestic ====
Yugoslavian First League top scorers

Season	Name	Goals
1933	(Kingdom of Yugoslavia) Vladimir Kragić	21
1935	(Kingdom of Yugoslavia) Leo Lemešić	18
1949	(Socialist Federal Republic of Yugoslavia) Frane Matošić	17
1955	(Socialist Federal Republic of Yugoslavia) Bernard Vukas	20
1966	(Socialist Federal Republic of Yugoslavia) Petar Nadoveza	21
1971	(Socialist Federal Republic of Yugoslavia) Petar Nadoveza	20
1985	(Socialist Federal Republic of Yugoslavia) Zlatko Vujović	25

Croatian First League top scorers

Season	Name	Goals
1992	(Croatia) Ardian Kozniku	12
2016–17	(Hungary) Márkó Futács	18
2018–19	(Croatia) Mijo Caktaš	19
2021–22	(Croatia) Marko Livaja	29
2022–23	(Croatia) Marko Livaja	19
2024–25	(Croatia) Marko Livaja	19

Yugoslav Footballer of the Year

- (Socialist Federal Republic of Yugoslavia) Ivan Buljan (1975)
- (Socialist Federal Republic of Yugoslavia) Ivica Šurjak (1976)
- (Socialist Federal Republic of Yugoslavia) Dražen Mužinić (1977)
- (Socialist Federal Republic of Yugoslavia) Zlatko Vujović (1981)
- (Socialist Federal Republic of Yugoslavia) Ivan Gudelj (1982)
- (Socialist Federal Republic of Yugoslavia) Zoran Simović (1983)
- (Socialist Federal Republic of Yugoslavia) Blaž Slišković (1985)

Croatian Footballer of the Year

- (Croatia) Stipe Pletikosa (2002)

Hope of the Year

- (Croatia) Jurica Vučko (1996)
- (Croatia) Nikola Kalinić (2007)
- (Croatia) Franko Andrijašević (2012)

Sportske novosti Yellow Shirt award

- (Socialist Federal Republic of Yugoslavia) Bernard Vukas (1953)
- (Socialist Federal Republic of Yugoslavia) Joško Vidošević (1955)
- (Socialist Federal Republic of Yugoslavia) Dragan Holcer (1968)
- (Socialist Federal Republic of Yugoslavia) Jurica Jerković (1971)
- (Socialist Federal Republic of Yugoslavia) Branko Oblak (1974)
- (Socialist Federal Republic of Yugoslavia) Jurica Jerković (1976)
- (Socialist Federal Republic of Yugoslavia) Zlatko Vujović (1981)
- (Socialist Federal Republic of Yugoslavia) Zoran Simović (1984)
- (Socialist Federal Republic of Yugoslavia) Aljoša Asanović (1990)
- (Croatia) Goran Vučević (1992)
- (Bosnia and Herzegovina) Senijad Ibričić (2010)
- (Croatia) Anas Sharbini (2012)
- (Bosnia and Herzegovina) Tino-Sven Sušić (2016)
- (Croatia) Mijo Caktaš (2019)
- (Croatia) Marko Livaja (2022)
- (Croatia) Marko Livaja (2023)

Croatian First League Player of the Year

- (Croatia) Slaven Bilić (1992)
- (Croatia) Ardian Kozniku (1992)
- (Croatia) Joško Jeličić (1993)
- (Bosnia and Herzegovina) Mirsad Hibić (1994)
- (Croatia) Nenad Pralija (1995)
- (Croatia) Stipe Pletikosa (2001)
- (Croatia) Stipe Pletikosa (2002)
- (Croatia) Tvrtko Kale (2004)
- (Croatia) Niko Kranjčar (2005)
- (Croatia) Nikola Kalinić (2008)

Prva HNL Player of the Year

- (Croatia) Marko Livaja (2022)
- (Croatia) Marko Livaja (2023)
- (Croatia) Marko Livaja (2025)

==== International ====
Ballon d'Or candidates

- (Socialist Federal Republic of Yugoslavia) Branko Oblak (1974) **19th place**
- (Socialist Federal Republic of Yugoslavia) Zlatko Vujović (1981) **19th place**

World Soccer Team of the Year

- (Socialist Federal Republic of Yugoslavia) Ante Žanetić (1960)

=== Hajduk Split dream team ===
In 2011 during Hajduk's 100th birthday celebration, the local newspaper Slobodna Dalmacija made a public poll for Hajduk fans to vote for Hajduk Split all-time best 11.

1	GK	YUG	Vladimir Beara (1947–55)
2	DF	YUG	Vilson Džoni (1967–77)
3	DF	YUG	Ivan Buljan (1967–77)
4	DF	YUG	Dragan Holcer (1967–75)
5	DF	YUG	Robert Jarni (1986–91)
6	MF	YUG	Blaž Slišković (1981–86)
7	MF	YUG	Jurica Jerković (1967–78)
8	MF	YUG	Dražen Mužinić (1971–80)
9	FW	YUG	Ivica Šurjak (1971–81)
10	MF	YUG	Frane Matošić (1935–39, 1940–41, 1944–55)
11	FW	YUG	Bernard Vukas (1947–57, 1959–63)

== Club records and statistics ==
Updated 24 June 2017

=== Competition appearances ===
- (Kingdom of Yugoslavia) (Socialist Federal Republic of Yugoslavia) Yugoslav First League – **61** out of 63 (1923–35, 1936–40, 1946–91).
- (Croatia) Prva HNL – **28** out of 28 (1992–current). One of four clubs that have participated in all seasons, alongside Dinamo Zagreb, Rijeka and Osijek.
- (Kingdom of Yugoslavia) (Socialist Federal Republic of Yugoslavia) Yugoslav Cup – **50** out of 56.
- (Croatia) Croatian Cup – **28** out of 28 (1992–current).
- (European Union) European competitions – **48** (1927, 1955–56, 1960–61, 1963–64, 1967–73, 1974–79, 1981–87, 1991–92, 1993–2005, 2007–current).

=== Final position ===
- Best position in (Kingdom of Yugoslavia) (Socialist Federal Republic of Yugoslavia) Yugoslav First League – **Winner**, 9 times (1927, 1929, 1950, 1952, 1954–55, 1970–71, 1973–74, 1974–75, 1978–79).
- Best placed Croatian club in (Kingdom of Yugoslavia) (Socialist Federal Republic of Yugoslavia) Yugoslav First League – **24 times**
- Best position in (Croatia) Prva HNL – **Winner**, 6 times (1992, 1993–94, 1994–95, 2000–01, 2003–04, 2004–05).
- Best position in (Kingdom of Yugoslavia) (Socialist Federal Republic of Yugoslavia) Yugoslav Cup – **Winner**, 9 times (1966–67, 1971–72, 1973, 1974, 1975–76, 1976–77, 1983–84, 1986–87, 1990–91).
- Best position in (Croatia) Croatian Cup – **Winner**, 6 times (1992–93, 1994–95, 1999–2000, 2002–03, 2009–10, 2012–13).
- Worst position in (Kingdom of Yugoslavia) (Socialist Federal Republic of Yugoslavia) Yugoslav First League – **13th**, 2 times (1965–66, 1987–88).
- Worst position in (Croatia) Prva HNL – **5th**, 2 times (2005–06, 2007–08).

Sources: hrnogomet.hr, hajduk.hr

=== League records and statistics ===
Updated 24 December 2017

- (Kingdom of Yugoslavia) Yugoslav First League (1927–40):
  - Matches played – 144 (ranked **1st**).
  - Wins – 66 (ranked **3rd**).
  - Draws – 32 (ranked **1st**).
  - Defeats – 46 (ranked **3rd**).
  - Goals scored – 310 (ranked **2nd**).
  - Goals conceded – 228 (ranked **3rd**).
  - Points – 164 (ranked **3rd**).
- (Socialist Federal Republic of Yugoslavia) Yugoslav First League (1946–91):
  - Matches played – 312 (ranked **1st**).
  - Wins – 592 (ranked **4th**).
  - Draws – 348 (ranked **1st**).
  - Defeats – 336 (ranked **6th**).
  - Goals scored – 2113 (ranked **4th**).
  - Goals conceded – 1487 (ranked **6th**).
  - Points – 1516 (ranked **4th**).
- (Croatia) Prva HNL:
  - Matches played – 851 (ranked **2nd**).
  - Wins – 474 (ranked **2nd**).
  - Draws – 196 (ranked **3rd**).
  - Defeats – 181 (ranked **10th**).
  - Goals scored – 1532 (ranked **2nd**).
  - Goals conceded – 801 (ranked **8th**).
  - Goals difference – +731 (ranked **2nd**).
  - Foreign players – 88 (ranked **2nd**).

=== Matches and scorelines ===
==== Firsts ====
- First match – **11 June 1911** v (Austria-Hungary) Calcio Spalato (9–0), Exhibition game.
- First official match – **28 March 1920** v (Kingdom of Yugoslavia) Borac Split (8–0), 1920 Split Championship.
- In Yugoslav First League – **2 September 1923** v (Kingdom of Yugoslavia) SAŠK (3–4).
- In Yugoslav Cup – **24 August 1924** v (Kingdom of Yugoslavia) Football selection of Sarajevo (6–0).
- In European competitions – **14 August 1927** v (Austria) SK Rapid Wien (1–8), Mitropa Cup 1927.
- At Poljud stadium – **19 September 1979** v (Turkey) Trabzonspor B.K. (1–0), 1979–80 European Cup.
- In Prva HNL – **29 February 1992** v (Croatia) Istra (3–1).
- In Croatian Cup – **24 March 1992** v (Croatia) Rijeka (0–0).

==== Lasts ====
- At Stari plac – **7 October 1979** v (Socialist Federal Republic of Yugoslavia) Vardar (0–0), 1979–80 Yugoslav First League.
- In Yugoslav First League – **16 June 1991** v (Socialist Federal Republic of Yugoslavia) Proleter (3–2).
- In Yugoslav Cup – **8 May 1991** v (Socialist Federal Republic of Yugoslavia) Red Star (1–0).

==== Biggest wins ====
- Record home official game win – **24–0** (20 November 1927 v (Kingdom of Yugoslavia) HAŠK Split, 1927 Split Championship).
- Home in Yugoslav First League – **14–0** (7 June 1931 v (Kingdom of Yugoslavia) FK Ilirija; 16 September 1934 v (Kingdom of Yugoslavia) FK Slavija (S)).
- Home in Prva HNL – **10–0** (5 June 1994 v (Croatia) Radnik).
- Home in Yugoslav Cup – **15–0** (3 December 1950 v (Socialist Federal Republic of Yugoslavia) Sobota).
- Home in Croatian Cup – **11–0** (17 August 1993 v (Croatia) Primorac Biograd).
- Home in European competitions – **7–1** (19 September 1974 v (Iceland) Keflavík, 1974–75 European Cup).
- Record away official game win – **10–0** (4 August 1946 v (Socialist Republic of Croatia) Jedinstvo Surčin, 1946 SR Croatia League).
- Away in Yugoslav First League – **6–0** (20 October 1935 v (Kingdom of Yugoslavia) Osvit (Š); 30 September 1951 v (Socialist Federal Republic of Yugoslavia) Napredak; 30 April 1955 v (Socialist Federal Republic of Yugoslavia) Dinamo).
- Away in Prva HNL – **6–0** (21 March 2026 v (Croatia) Vukovar 1991).
- Away in Yugoslav Cup – **9–1** (4 August 1966 v (Socialist Federal Republic of Yugoslavia) Metalac (Z)).
- Away in Croatian Cup – **10–2** (21 September 2010 v (Croatia) Rudar 47).
- Away in European competitions – **8–0** (29 August 2002 v (Faroe Islands) GÍ Gøta, 2002–03 UEFA Cup).

==== Biggest defeats ====
- Home in Yugoslav First League – **1–6** (11 December 1955 v (Socialist Federal Republic of Yugoslavia) Vojvodina).
- Home in Prva HNL – **1–5** (17 August 2001 v (Croatia) Varteks), **0–4** (10 August 2016 v (Croatia) Dinamo Zagreb).
- Home in Yugoslav Cup – **0–4** (7 November 1954 v (Socialist Federal Republic of Yugoslavia) Partizan).
- Home in Croatian Cup – **0–3** (23 September 1992 v (Croatia) Split).
- Home in European competitions – **0–5** (3 August 2005 v (Hungary) Debreceni, 2005–06 UEFA Champions League).
- Away in Yugoslav First League – **0–9** (6 June 1940 v (Kingdom of Yugoslavia) BSK).
- Away in Prva HNL – **0–4** (27 March 1994 v Croatia Zagreb; 22 September 2007 v Rijeka; 19 March 2008 v Varteks; 16 May 2015 v Dinamo).
- Away in Yugoslav Cup – **0–6** (1 August 1926 v (Kingdom of Yugoslavia) Belgrade XI)
- Away in Croatian Cup – **0–5** (4 December 2013 v (Croatia) Dinamo).
- Away in European competitions – **0–6** (3 August 2005 v (Netherlands) Ajax, 1993–94 UEFA Champions League).

==== Highest scoring draws ====
- In Yugoslav First League – **5–5** (11 August 1929 v (Kingdom of Yugoslavia) BSK).
- In Prva HNL – **3–3**, 6 times.
- In European competitions – **2–2**, 8 times.
- In Yugoslav Cup – **3–3** (31 May 1969 v (Socialist Federal Republic of Yugoslavia) Dinamo).
- In Croatian Cup – **3–3** (27 April 1994 v (Croatia) Rijeka; 22 May 2013 v (Croatia) Lokomotiva).

Sources: hrnogomet.hr, hajduk.hr

=== Records and statistics by season ===
==== Points ====
- Most points in one season:
  - 3 pts for a win – **78** in 32 matches (2003–04).
  - 2 pts for a win – **50** in 34 matches (1978–79, 1993–94).
- Highest percentage of points in one season:
  - 3 pts for a win – **81.25%** (2003–04).
  - 2 pts for a win – **86.1%** (1940–41).
- Fewest points in one season:
  - 3 pts for a win – **40** in 32 matches (2005–06).
  - 2 pts for a win – **5** in 10 matches (1939–40).
- Lowest percentage of points in one season:
  - 3 pts for a win – **41.66%** (2005–06).
  - 2 pts for a win – **25.0%** (1939–40).

==== Wins ====
- Most wins in one season:
  - All official fixtures – **31** in 44 matches (2002–03).
  - In (Kingdom of Yugoslavia) (Socialist Federal Republic of Yugoslavia) Yugoslav First League – **20** in 34 matches (1974–75, 1978–79).
  - In (Croatia) Prva HNL – **25** in 32 matches (2003–04).
  - Home in (Kingdom of Yugoslavia) (Socialist Federal Republic of Yugoslavia) Yugoslav First League – **15** in 17 matches (1978–79).
  - Home in (Croatia) Prva HNL – **15** in 16 matches (2002–03).
  - Away in (Kingdom of Yugoslavia) (Socialist Federal Republic of Yugoslavia) Yugoslav First League – **8** in 17 matches (1974–75).
  - Away in (Croatia) Prva HNL – **11** in 16 matches (2003–04).
  - In (Kingdom of Yugoslavia) (Socialist Federal Republic of Yugoslavia) Yugoslav Cup – **5** in 5 matches (1971–72, 1974, 1975–76).
  - In (Croatia) Croatian Cup – **7** in 8 matches (2002–03).
  - In (European Union) European competitions – **6** in 10 matches (1983–84 UEFA Cup).
- Fewest wins in one season:
  - All official fixtures – **9** in 32 matches (1964–65), **10** in 41 matches (1987–88).
  - In (Kingdom of Yugoslavia) (Socialist Federal Republic of Yugoslavia) Yugoslav First League – **7** in 28 matches (1964–65), **8** in 34 matches (1987–88).
  - In (Croatia) Prva HNL – **10** in 32 matches (2005–06).
  - Home in (Kingdom of Yugoslavia) (Socialist Federal Republic of Yugoslavia) Yugoslav First League – **6** in 14 matches (1964–65), **8** in 17 matches (1987–88).
  - Home in (Croatia) Prva HNL – **7** in 17 matches (2012–13).
  - Away in (Kingdom of Yugoslavia) (Socialist Federal Republic of Yugoslavia) Yugoslav First League – **0** in 17 matches (1968–69, 1987–88), **0** in 15 matches (1965–66).
  - Away in (Croatia) Prva HNL – **2** in 16 matches (2005–06).

==== Defeats ====
- Most defeats in one season:
  - All official fixtures – **20** in 48 matches (1972–73).
  - In (Kingdom of Yugoslavia) (Socialist Federal Republic of Yugoslavia) Yugoslav First League – **17** in 34 matches (1972–73).
  - In (Croatia) Prva HNL – **13** in 36 matches (2014–15).
  - Home in (Kingdom of Yugoslavia) (Socialist Federal Republic of Yugoslavia) Yugoslav First League – **5** in 17 matches (1968–69).
  - Home in (Croatia) Prva HNL – **4** in 18 matches (2014–15).
  - Away in (Kingdom of Yugoslavia) (Socialist Federal Republic of Yugoslavia) Yugoslav First League – **16** in 17 matches (1972–73).
  - Away in (Croatia) Prva HNL – **9** in 18 matches (2014–15).
  - In domestic cups – **3** in 8 matches (2004–05).
  - In (European Union) European competitions – **6** in 10 matches (2010–11 UEFA Europa League).
- Fewest defeats in one season:
  - All official fixtures – **1** in 23 matches (1950).
  - In (Kingdom of Yugoslavia) (Socialist Federal Republic of Yugoslavia) Yugoslav First League – **unbeaten** in 18 matches (1950).
  - In (Croatia) Prva HNL – **2** in 22 matches (1992), **3** in 30 matches (1994–95).
  - Home in (Kingdom of Yugoslavia) (Socialist Federal Republic of Yugoslavia) Yugoslav First League – **0** in 5 matches (1930), **0** in 9 matches (1950), **0** in 10 matches (1933), **0** in 11 matches (1951, 1960–61),
    **0** in 17 matches (1970–71, 1980–81).
  - Home in (Croatia) Prva HNL – **0** in 15 matches (1992–93, 1994–95), **0** in 16 matches (1995–96, 2002–03).
  - Away in (Kingdom of Yugoslavia) (Socialist Federal Republic of Yugoslavia) Yugoslav First League – **0** in 5 matches (1929), **0** in 9 matches (1950).
  - Away in (Croatia) Prva HNL – **1** in 11 matches (1992), **3** in 15 matches (1994–95, 2001–02), **4** in 18 matches (2016–17).

==== Draws ====
- Most draws in one season:
  - All official fixtures – **17** in 42 matches (1968–69).
  - In (Kingdom of Yugoslavia) (Socialist Federal Republic of Yugoslavia) Yugoslav First League – **16** in 34 matches (1968–69).
  - In (Croatia) Prva HNL – **11** in 36 matches (2013–14), **10** in 30 matches (1992–93).
  - Home in (Kingdom of Yugoslavia) (Socialist Federal Republic of Yugoslavia) Yugoslav First League – **7** in 17 matches (1983–84, 1987–88), **5** in 14 matches (1964–65), **4** in 9 matches (1950).
  - Home in (Croatia) Prva HNL – **5** in 17 matches (2013–14, 2014–15, 2015–16), **4** in 15 matches (1992–93).
  - Away in (Kingdom of Yugoslavia) (Socialist Federal Republic of Yugoslavia) Yugoslav First League – **11** in 17 matches (1968–68), **5** in 9 matches (1948–49).
  - Away in (Croatia) Prva HNL – **8** in 16 matches (1998–99).
  - In domestic cups – **3** in 8 matches, 5 times.
  - In (European Union) European competitions – **3** in 4 matches (1969–70 Mitropa Cup).
- Fewest draws in one season:
  - All official fixtures – **1** in 19 matches (1952), **2** in 20 matches (1933), **3** in 32 matches (1953–54), **4** in 47 matches (1972–73).
  - In (Kingdom of Yugoslavia) (Socialist Federal Republic of Yugoslavia) Yugoslav First League – **1** in 16 matches (1952), **2** in 20 matches (1933), **3** in 34 matches (1972–73, 1989–90).
  - In (Croatia) Prva HNL – **3** in 32 matches (2003–04).
  - Home in (Kingdom of Yugoslavia) (Socialist Federal Republic of Yugoslavia) Yugoslav First League – **0** in 11 matches (1951), **1** in 17 matches (1978–79, 1981–82).
  - Home in (Croatia) Prva HNL – **1** in 17 matches (1993–94).
  - Away in (Kingdom of Yugoslavia) (Socialist Federal Republic of Yugoslavia) Yugoslav First League – **0** in 17 matches (1972–73).
  - Away in (Croatia) Prva HNL – **2** in 16 matches (2003–04, 2009–10).

==== Goals ====
- Most goals scored in one season:
  - All official fixtures – **112** in 46 matches (1993–94), **103** in 36 matches (1934–35).
  - In (Kingdom of Yugoslavia) (Socialist Federal Republic of Yugoslavia) Yugoslav First League – **72** in 24 matches (1934–35).
  - In (Croatia) Prva HNL – **84** in 34 matches (1993–94).
  - Home in (Kingdom of Yugoslavia) (Socialist Federal Republic of Yugoslavia) Yugoslav First League – **58** in 12 matches (1934–35).
  - Home in (Croatia) Prva HNL – **61** in 17 matches (1993–94).
  - Away in (Kingdom of Yugoslavia) (Socialist Federal Republic of Yugoslavia) Yugoslav First League – **31** in 13 matches (1980–81).
  - Away in (Croatia) Prva HNL – **29** in 15 matches (2001–02).
  - In domestic cups – **31** in 12 matches (1934), **28** in 10 matches (1994–95), **25** in 5 matches (1950).
  - In (European Union) European competition – **17** in 6 matches (1975–76 European Cup), **17** in 8 matches (2015–16 UEFA Europa League).
- Fewest goals scored in one season:
  - All official fixtures – **31** in 24 matches (1961–62), **40** in 32 matches (1964–65), **50** in 43 matches (1976–77).
  - In (Kingdom of Yugoslavia) (Socialist Federal Republic of Yugoslavia) Yugoslav First League – **39** in 17 matches (1983–84), **28** in 14 matches (1964–65), **26** in 13 matches (1962–63).
  - In (Croatia) Prva HNL – **40** in 32 matches (2005–06).
  - Home in (Kingdom of Yugoslavia) (Socialist Federal Republic of Yugoslavia) Yugoslav First League – **23** in 17 matches (1986–87), **16** in 14 matches (1964–65).
  - Home in (Croatia) Prva HNL – **25** in 15 matches (2011–12), **27** in 18 matches (2015–16).
  - Away in (Kingdom of Yugoslavia) (Socialist Federal Republic of Yugoslavia) Yugoslav First League – **5** in 17 matches (1972–73).
  - Away in (Croatia) Prva HNL – **10** in 16 matches (2005–06).
- Most goals conceded in one season:
  - All official fixtures – **68** in 48 matches (2014–15), **62** in 41 matches (1971–72, 1987–88), **60** in 36 matches (1934–35), **58** in 28 matches (1939–40),
    **51** in 30 matches (1957–58).
  - In (Kingdom of Yugoslavia) (Socialist Federal Republic of Yugoslavia) Yugoslav First League – **56** in 34 matches (1971–72), **44** in 26 matches (1963–64), **38** in 18 matches (1937–38), **35** in 22 matches (1952–53, 1958–59),
    **29** in 10 matches (1939–40).
  - In (Croatia) Prva HNL – **56** in 36 matches (2014–15).
  - Home in (Kingdom of Yugoslavia) (Socialist Federal Republic of Yugoslavia) Yugoslav First League – **25** in 17 matches (1963–64), **20** in 13 matches (1955–56).
  - Home in (Croatia) Prva HNL – **25** in 18 matches (2014–15).
  - Away in (Kingdom of Yugoslavia) (Socialist Federal Republic of Yugoslavia) Yugoslav First League – **37** in 17 matches (1972–73), **33** in 13 matches (1963–64), **28** in 9 matches (1937–38).
  - Away in (Croatia) Prva HNL – **31** in 18 matches (2014–15).
  - In domestic cups – **22** in 12 matches (1934), **10** in 8 matches (2004–05).
  - In (European Union) European competition – **18** in 10 matches (2010–11 UEFA Europa League), **13** in 6 matches (1981–82 UEFA Cup), **9** in 2 matches (1927 Mitropa Cup).
- Fewest goals conceded in one season:
  - All official fixtures – **11** in 14 matches (1932), **15** in 24 matches (1992), **28** in 45 matches (1975–76).
  - In (Kingdom of Yugoslavia) (Socialist Federal Republic of Yugoslavia) Yugoslav First League – **11** in 14 matches (1932), **13** in 18 matches (1950), **22** in 34 matches (1975–76, 1983–84).
  - In (Croatia) Prva HNL – **14** in 22 matches (1992), **22** in 32 matches (2002–03).
  - Home in (Kingdom of Yugoslavia) (Socialist Federal Republic of Yugoslavia) Yugoslav First League – **7** in 17 matches (1969–70), **4** in 10 matches (1933), **3** in 7 matches (1932).
  - Home in (Croatia) Prva HNL – **5** in 16 matches (2002–03), **5** in 11 matches (1992).
  - Away in (Kingdom of Yugoslavia) (Socialist Federal Republic of Yugoslavia) Yugoslav First League – **11** in 17 matches (1973–74).
  - Away in (Croatia) Prva HNL – **9** in 11 matches (1992), **12** in 15 matches (1994–95), **13** in 16 matches (2003–04), **14** in 18 matches (2016–17).

==== Goal difference ====
- Best league goal difference in one season:
  - In (Kingdom of Yugoslavia) (Socialist Federal Republic of Yugoslavia) Yugoslav First League – **+42** in 26 matches (1954–55).
  - In (Croatia) Prva HNL – **+48** in 34 matches (1993–94).
  - Home in (Kingdom of Yugoslavia) (Socialist Federal Republic of Yugoslavia) Yugoslav First League – **+45** in 12 matches (1934–35).
  - Home in (Croatia) Prva HNL – **+47** in 17 matches (1993–94).
  - Away in (Kingdom of Yugoslavia) (Socialist Federal Republic of Yugoslavia) Yugoslav First League – **+9** in 9 matches (1948–49).
  - Away in (Croatia) Prva HNL – **+14** in 15 matches (2001–02).
- Worst league goal difference in one season:
  - In (Kingdom of Yugoslavia) (Socialist Federal Republic of Yugoslavia) Yugoslav First League – **-17** in 26 matches (1962–63).
  - In (Croatia) Prva HNL – **+3** in 36 matches (2014–15).
  - Home in (Kingdom of Yugoslavia) (Socialist Federal Republic of Yugoslavia) Yugoslav First League – **+3** in 13 matches (1962–63).
  - Home in (Croatia) Prva HNL – **+11** in 18 matches (2014–15).
  - Away in (Kingdom of Yugoslavia) (Socialist Federal Republic of Yugoslavia) Yugoslav First League – **-32** in 17 matches (1972–73).
  - Away in (Croatia) Prva HNL – **-8** in 36 matches (2014–15), **-8** in 32 matches (2006–06).

==== Disciplinary ====
(Croatia) Prva HNL only.

- Yellow cards:
  - Most (total) – **106** in 36 matches (2014–15).
  - Fewest (total) – **28** in 22 matches (1992).
  - Most (average per match) – **2.944** (2014–15).
  - Fewest (average per match) – **1.273** (1992).
- Red cards:
  - Most (total) – **14** in 32 matches (2002–03).
  - Fewest (total) – **2** in 30 matches (1994–95, 2009–10, 2010–11).
  - Most (average per match) – **0.438** (2002–03).
  - Fewest (average per match) – **0.056** (2014–15).

Sources: hrnogomet.hr, hajduk.hr

=== Sequences and runs ===
Currently active sequences are in bold/italics.

==== Goals ====
- Longest streak without conceding a goal:
  - In (Kingdom of Yugoslavia) (Socialist Federal Republic of Yugoslavia) Yugoslav First League – **789 minutes** (25 Nov 1973 to 27 Mar 1974).
  - In (Croatia) Prva HNL – **776 minutes** (10 Aug 2015 to 24 Oct 2015).
  - In (Kingdom of Yugoslavia) (Socialist Federal Republic of Yugoslavia) Yugoslav Cup – at least **540 minutes** (28 Nov 1973 to 23 Sep 1975).
  - In (Croatia) Croatian Cup – **705 minutes** (7 Apr 1992 to 5 May 1993).
  - In (European Union) European competitions – **461 minutes** (29 Sep 1993 to 19 Oct 1994).
- Longest streak without scoring a goal:
  - In (Kingdom of Yugoslavia) (Socialist Federal Republic of Yugoslavia) Yugoslav First League – **4 matches** (3 times).
  - In (Croatia) Prva HNL – **359 minutes** (19 Nov 2005 to 25 Feb 2006).
  - In (Kingdom of Yugoslavia) (Socialist Federal Republic of Yugoslavia) Yugoslav Cup – at least **180 minutes** (4 times).
  - In (Croatia) Croatian Cup – **353 minutes** (18 Apr 2001 to 16 Oct 2002).
  - In (European Union) European competitions – **319 minutes** (5 Nov 1986 to 30 Sep 1987).
- Longest scoring run:
  - In (Kingdom of Yugoslavia) (Socialist Federal Republic of Yugoslavia) Yugoslav First League – **25 matches** (9 Jun 1940 to 20 Oct 1946).
  - In (Croatia) Prva HNL – **20 matches** (22 Sep 2002 to 3 May 2003).
  - In (Kingdom of Yugoslavia) (Socialist Federal Republic of Yugoslavia) Yugoslav Cup – **30 matches** (2 Dec 1970 to 15 Feb 1978).
  - In (Croatia) Croatian Cup – **14 matches** (6 Oct 1992 to 15 Mar 1994).
  - In (European Union) European competitions – **10 matches** (19 Mar 1980 to 20 Oct 1982).
- Longest conceding run:
  - In (Kingdom of Yugoslavia) (Socialist Federal Republic of Yugoslavia) Yugoslav First League – **13 matches** (**16** excluding qualifiers for 1935–36 season) (21 Apr 1935 to 27 Sep 1936).
  - In (Croatia) Prva HNL – **10 matches** (2 May 1999 to 29 Aug 1999).
  - In (Kingdom of Yugoslavia) (Socialist Federal Republic of Yugoslavia) Yugoslav Cup – **8 matches** (2 times).
  - In (Croatia) Croatian Cup – **8 matches** (10 Apr 2013 to 18 Dec 2013).
  - In (European Union) European competitions – **10 matches** (7 Nov 1979 to 22 Sep 1982).

==== Wins ====
- Longest winning streak:
  - In (Kingdom of Yugoslavia) (Socialist Federal Republic of Yugoslavia) Yugoslav First League – **6 matches** (4 times).
  - In (Croatia) Prva HNL – **9 matches** (26 Aug 2001 to 28 Oct 2001).
  - In (Kingdom of Yugoslavia) (Socialist Federal Republic of Yugoslavia) Yugoslav Cup – **12 matches** (28 Nov 1973 to 1 Dec 1976).
  - In (Croatia) Croatian Cup – **6 matches** (6 Oct 1992 to 21 Apr 1993; 9 Dec 2001 to 23 Apr 2003).
  - In (European Union) European competitions – **5 matches** (17 Sep 1975 to 17 Mar 1976).
  - Home in (Kingdom of Yugoslavia) (Socialist Federal Republic of Yugoslavia) Yugoslav First League – **13 matches** (26 Oct 1975 to 13 Mar 1977).
  - Home in (Croatia) Prva HNL – **15 matches** (1 Sep 2002 to 27 Jul 2003).
  - Home in (Kingdom of Yugoslavia) (Socialist Federal Republic of Yugoslavia) Yugoslav Cup – **12 matches** (14 Aug 1955 to 20 Nov 1963).
  - Home in (Croatia) Croatian Cup – **10 matches** (21 Oct 1998 to 9 May 2001).
  - Home in (European Union) European competitions – **8 matches** (9 Dec 1981 to 11 Apr 1984). (Note: First loss came while playing a home game against Dynamo Moscow in Osijek. Hajduk held a 14 games winning streak in Split from 9 Dec 1981 to 22 Oct 1986.)
  - Away in (Kingdom of Yugoslavia) (Socialist Federal Republic of Yugoslavia) Yugoslav First League – **4 matches** (21 June 1953 to 22 Sep 1954).
  - Away in (Croatia) Prva HNL – **6 matches** (4 Apr 1992 to 16 May 1992).
  - Away in (Kingdom of Yugoslavia) (Socialist Federal Republic of Yugoslavia) Yugoslav Cup – **5 matches** (3 Nov 1965 to 16 Aug 1967).
  - Away in (Croatia) Croatian Cup – **5 matches** (16 May 2001 to 23 Apr 2003).
  - Away in (European Union) European competitions – **2 matches** (4 times).
- Longest winning streak (one or two-legged knock-out rounds):
  - In (Kingdom of Yugoslavia) (Socialist Federal Republic of Yugoslavia) Yugoslav Cup – **27 rounds** (23 Feb 1972 to 15 Feb 1978).
  - In (Croatia) Croatian Cup – **9 rounds** (22 Sep 1999 to 18 Apr 2001).
  - In (European Union) European competitions – **4 rounds** (14 Sep 1983 to 21 Mar 1984).

==== Unbeaten ====
- Longest streak without a loss:
  - In (Kingdom of Yugoslavia) (Socialist Federal Republic of Yugoslavia) Yugoslav First League – **25 matches** (15 May 1949 to 8 Apr 1951).
  - In (Croatia) Prva HNL – **21 matches** (5 Mar 1995 to 20 Sep 1995).
  - In (Kingdom of Yugoslavia) (Socialist Federal Republic of Yugoslavia) Yugoslav Cup – **28 matches** (23 Feb 1972 to 15 Feb 1978).
  - In (Croatia) Croatian Cup – **20 matches** (17 Aug 1993 to 11 Oct 1995).
  - In (European Union) European competitions – **7 matches** (18 Sep 1985 to 19 Mar 1986).
  - Home in (Kingdom of Yugoslavia) (Socialist Federal Republic of Yugoslavia) Yugoslav First League – **30 matches** (16 Nov 1958 to 1 Oct 1961).
  - Home in (Croatia) Prva HNL – **49 matches** (6 Mar 1994 to 23 Mar 1997).
  - Home in (Kingdom of Yugoslavia) (Socialist Federal Republic of Yugoslavia) Yugoslav Cup – **26 matches** in (14 Oct 1964 to 15 Feb 1978).
  - Home in (Croatia) Croatian Cup – **19 matches** in (6 Oct 1992 to 15 Apr 1998).
  - Home in (European Union) European competitions – **16 matches** in (22 Dec 1968 to 4 Nov 1976). (Note: Hajduk held a 21 matches unbeaten streak in Split from 9 Dec 1981 to 7 Dec 1994, although losing games against Dynamo Moscow in 1984 while playing home in Osijek, and Olympique Marseille in 1987 after the game was later awarded 0–3 due to crowd trouble.)
  - Away in (Kingdom of Yugoslavia) (Socialist Federal Republic of Yugoslavia) Yugoslav First League – **12 matches** (18 May 1949 to 8 Apr 1951).
  - Away in (Croatia) Prva HNL – **10 matches** (7 Mar 1992 to 26 May 1992).
  - Away in (Kingdom of Yugoslavia) (Socialist Federal Republic of Yugoslavia) Yugoslav Cup – **12 matches** (15 Mar 1972 to 17 Oct 1979).
  - Away in (Croatia) Croatian Cup – **11 matches** (16 Oct 2001 to 8 Mar 2005).
  - Away in (European Union) European competitions – **5 matches** (19 Jul 2007 to 29 Jul 2010).

==== Winless ====
- Longest streak without a win:
  - In (Kingdom of Yugoslavia) (Socialist Federal Republic of Yugoslavia) Yugoslav First League – **9 matches** (16 Aug 1964 to 12 Nov 1964).
  - In (Croatia) Prva HNL – **8 matches** (13 May 2018 to 1 Sep 2018).
  - In (Kingdom of Yugoslavia) (Socialist Federal Republic of Yugoslavia) Yugoslav Cup – **5 matches** (26 Feb 1978 to 11 Nov 1981; 26 Aug 1999 to 8 Aug 2001).
  - In (Croatia) Croatian Cup – **3 matches** (3 times).
  - In (European Union) European competitions – **7 matches** (2 Nov 1994 to 17 Jul 1996; 26 Aug 1999 to 8 Aug 2001).
  - Home in (Kingdom of Yugoslavia) (Socialist Federal Republic of Yugoslavia) Yugoslav First League – **5 matches** (9 Jun 1963 to 17 Nov 1963).
  - Home in (Croatia) Prva HNL – **4 matches** (1 Mar 2015 to 18 Apr 2015).
  - Home in (Kingdom of Yugoslavia) (Socialist Federal Republic of Yugoslavia) Yugoslav Cup – **4 matches** (8 Oct 1986 to 2 May 1990).
  - Home in (Croatia) Croatian Cup – **2 matches** (5 times; current streak started on 4 March 2015 –).
  - Home in (European Union) European competitions – **3 matches** (3 times).
  - Away in (Kingdom of Yugoslavia) (Socialist Federal Republic of Yugoslavia) Yugoslav First League – **23 matches** (13 Dec 1964 to 4 Sep 1966).
  - Away in (Croatia) Prva HNL – **11 matches** (7 Dec 1997 to 21 Aug 1998).
  - Away in (Kingdom of Yugoslavia) (Socialist Federal Republic of Yugoslavia) Yugoslav Cup – **6 matches** (14 Sep 1924 to 24 Jun 1934; 1 Jul 1934 to 26 Nov 1950).
  - Away in (Croatia) Croatian Cup – **3 matches** (4 times).
  - Away in (European Union) European competitions – **9 matches** (30 Jun 1963 to 27 Sep 1972; 14 Aug 2008 to 9 Aug 2012).

==== Defeats ====
- Longest losing streak:
  - In (Kingdom of Yugoslavia) (Socialist Federal Republic of Yugoslavia) Yugoslav First League – **5 matches** (11 May 1980 to 1 June 1980).
  - In (Croatia) Prva HNL – **4 matches** (22 Mar 2015 to 18 Apr 2015). (Note: Hajduk held another 4 matches losing streak from 14 Apr 2012 to 12 May 2012, interrupted by being awarded a 3–0 win against Varaždin, which was suspended at the time.)
  - In (Kingdom of Yugoslavia) (Socialist Federal Republic of Yugoslavia) Yugoslav Cup – **3 matches** (29 Jan 1939 to 2 Nov 1949).
  - In (Croatia) Croatian Cup – **2 matches** (5 times).
  - In (European Union) European competitions – **6 matches** (21 Oct 2010 to 19 Jul 2012).
  - Home in (Kingdom of Yugoslavia) (Socialist Federal Republic of Yugoslavia) Yugoslav First League – **3 matches** (12 Jun 1966 to 16 Oct 1966).
  - Home in (Croatia) Prva HNL – **2 matches** (8 times).
  - Home in (Kingdom of Yugoslavia) (Socialist Federal Republic of Yugoslavia) Yugoslav Cup – **2 matches** (11 Mar 1987 to 9 Aug 1989).
  - Home in (Croatia) Croatian Cup – **2 matches** (9 May 2001 to 6 Nov 2002).
  - Home in (European Union) European competitions – **3 matches** (4 Nov 2010 to 10 Jul 2012).
  - Away in (Kingdom of Yugoslavia) (Socialist Federal Republic of Yugoslavia) Yugoslav First League – **18 matches** (17 May 1972 to 20 May 1973).
  - Away in (Croatia) Prva HNL – **5 matches** (6 Apr 2014 to 27 Jul 2014).
  - Away in (Kingdom of Yugoslavia) (Socialist Federal Republic of Yugoslavia) Yugoslav Cup – **6 matches** (1 Jul 1934 to 26 Nov 1950).
  - Away in (Croatia) Croatian Cup – **1 match**.
  - Away in (European Union) European competitions – **5 matches** (3 times).

==== Draws ====
- Longest drawing streak:
  - In (Kingdom of Yugoslavia) (Socialist Federal Republic of Yugoslavia) Yugoslav First League – **4 matches** (5 times).
  - In (Croatia) Prva HNL – **4 matches** (7 Mar 1993 to 28 Mar 1993).
  - In (Kingdom of Yugoslavia) (Socialist Federal Republic of Yugoslavia) Yugoslav Cup – **2 matches** (5 times).
  - In (Croatia) Croatian Cup – **3 matches** (30 Mar 1994 to 27 Apr 1994).
  - In (European Union) European competitions – **3 matches** (26 Nov 1969 to 10 Apr 1970; 2 Aug 2000 to 8 Aug 2001).
  - Home in (Kingdom of Yugoslavia) (Socialist Federal Republic of Yugoslavia) Yugoslav First League – **3 matches** (27 Aug 1950 to 24 Sep 1950; 13 Sep 1986 to 18 Oct 1986).
  - Home in (Croatia) Prva HNL – **4 matches** (9 Nov 1992 to 28 Mar 1993).
  - Home in (Kingdom of Yugoslavia) (Socialist Federal Republic of Yugoslavia) Yugoslav Cup – **2 matches** (15 Jan 1939 to 22 Jan 1939; 9 Aug 1989 to 8 Nov 1989).
  - Home in (Croatia) Croatian Cup – **2 matches** (14 May 2008 to 4 Mar 2009).
  - Home in (European Union) European competitions – **2 matches** (3 times).
  - Away in (Kingdom of Yugoslavia) (Socialist Federal Republic of Yugoslavia) Yugoslav First League – **5 matches** (25 Aug 1968 to 17 Nov 1968; 5 Oct 1983 to 29 Feb 1984).
  - Away in (Croatia) Prva HNL – **4 matches** (22 Jul 2007 to 2 Sep 2007).
  - Away in (Kingdom of Yugoslavia) (Socialist Federal Republic of Yugoslavia) Yugoslav Cup – **2 matches** (20 Aug 1987 to 10 Aug 1988).
  - Away in (Croatia) Croatian Cup – **3 matches** (8 Nov 1994 to 19 Apr 1995).
  - Away in (European Union) European competitions – **2 matches** (5 times).

Sources: hrnogomet.hr, hajduk.hr

=== Opponents and familiarity ===
- Club played most often (all official matches) – **212 times** v. (Socialist Federal Republic of Yugoslavia) (Croatia) Dinamo Zagreb.
- Club played most often in domestic leagues – **173 times** v. (Socialist Federal Republic of Yugoslavia) (Croatia) Dinamo Zagreb.
- Club played most often in domestic cups – **31 times** v. (Socialist Federal Republic of Yugoslavia) (Croatia) Dinamo Zagreb.
- Club played most often in European competitions – **6 times** v. (England) Tottenham Hotspur (1967–68, 1983–84, 1991–92).
- Club played most often in one season – **7 times** v. (Croatia) Rijeka (2005–06); v. (Croatia) Dinamo Zagreb (2013–14).

=== Records and statistics against major rivals ===
Updated 24 December 2017

==== v. Dinamo Zagreb ====
Competition	Played	Hajduk wins	Draws	Dinamo wins	Hajduk goals	Dinamo goals
1946 Croatian First League
League	2	2	0	0	6	2
Yugoslav championship (1946–1991)
League	90	31	26	33	121	123
Yugoslav Cup	11	3	2	6	11	19
**Yugoslavia totals**	**101**	**34**	**28**	**39**	**132**	**142**
Croatian championship (1992–present)
Prva HNL	81	23	21	37	84	115
Croatian Cup	20	6	3	11	18	31
Supercup	8	2	3	3	8	11
**Croatia totals**	**109**	**31**	**27**	**51**	**110**	**157**
By competition
**League**	**173**	**56**	**47**	**70**	**211**	**240**
League (home)	86	38	24	24	128	102
League (away)	87	18	23	46	83	138
**Cup**	**39**	**11**	**8**	**20**	**37**	**61**
Cup (home)	15	8	4	3	19	11
Cup (away)	19	1	3	15	11	39
Cup (neutral)	5	2	1	2	7	11
TOTALS
**All Time**	**212**	**67**	**55**	**90**	**248**	**301**

- Biggest wins and defeats:
  - Home win in (Socialist Federal Republic of Yugoslavia) Yugoslav First League – **5–1** (1957–58, 25 August 1957).
  - Home win in (Croatia) Prva HNL – **4–1** (2002–03, 11 May 2003).
  - Away win in (Socialist Federal Republic of Yugoslavia) Yugoslav First League – **6–0** (1954–55, 3 April 1955).
  - Away win in (Croatia) Prva HNL – **2–0** (2008–09, 21 September 2008), **2–0** (2016–17, 22 April 2017).
  - Home defeat in (Socialist Federal Republic of Yugoslavia) Yugoslav First League – **1–5** (1971–72, 4 June 1972).
  - Home defeat in (Croatia) Prva HNL – **0–4** (2016–17, 10 August 2016).
  - Away defeat in (Socialist Federal Republic of Yugoslavia) Yugoslav First League – **1–5** (1952–53, 31 May 1953), **0–4** (1957–58, 2 March 1958).
  - Away defeat in (Croatia) Prva HNL – **0–4** (1993–94, 27 March 1993), **0–4** (2014–15, 16 May 2015).
- Longest winning streak:
  - Overall – **6 matches** (29 May 1960 to 18 March 1962).
  - Home – **6 matches** (18 September 1993 to 28 April 1996).
  - Away – **3 matches** (3 March 1974 to 7 September 1975).
- Longest losing streak:
  - Overall – **6 matches** (4 December 2013 to 22 November 2014). (Note: During the streak one of the matches was abandoned and later awarded 3–0 to Dinamo due to Hajduk players reluctance to enter the stadium.)
  - Home – **3 matches** (18 December 2013 to 31 August 2014).
  - Away – **6 matches** (1995–99, 2006–08).
- Longest unbeaten streak:
  - Overall – **7 matches** (1966–69, 1974–76).
  - Home – **14 matches** (15 October 1950 to 2 December 1962).
  - Away – **4 matches** (12 December 1964 to 12 October 1969).
- Longest streak without a win:
  - Overall – **13 matches** (14 September 2013 to 20 March 2016).
  - Home – **6 matches** (14 September 2013 to 20 March 2016).
  - Away – **18 matches** (21 September 2008 to 22 April 2017).
- Longest drawing streak:
  - Overall – **3 matches** (1982–83; 1999–2000).
  - Home – **2 matches** (7 times).
  - Away – **4 matches** (12 Dec 1965 to 20 Oct 1968).

Sources: hrnogomet.hr, hajduk.hr

==== v. HNK Rijeka ====
Competition	Played	Hajduk wins	Draws	Rijeka wins	Hajduk goals	Rijeka goals
Yugoslav championship (1946–1991)
League	58	24	23	11	90	61
Yugoslav Cup	5	1	2	2	5	6
**Yugoslavia totals**	63	25	25	13	95	67
Croatian championship (1992–present)
Prva HNL	75	30	19	26	103	96
Croatian Cup	8	0	5	3	6	9
Supercup	1	1	0	0	1	0
**Croatia totals**	**84**	**31**	**24**	**29**	**110**	**105**
By competition
**League**	**133**	**54**	**42**	**37**	**193**	**157**
League (home)	66	37	17	12	126	67
League (away)	67	17	25	25	67	90
**Cup**	**14**	**2**	**7**	**5**	**12**	**15**
Cup (home)	6	1	3	2	5	8
Cup (away)	6	1	2	3	5	5
Cup (neutral)	2	0	2	0	2	2
TOTALS
**All time**	**147**	**56**	**49**	**42**	**205**	**172**

- Biggest wins and defeats:
  - Home win in (Socialist Federal Republic of Yugoslavia) Yugoslav First League – **6–2** (1958–59, 7 June 1959), **4–0** (1959–60, 13 September 1959), **4–0** (1965–66, 24 October 1965),
    **4–0** (1988–89, 28 May 1989).
  - Home win in (Croatia) Prva HNL – **4–0** (2003–04, 28 February 2004).
  - Away win in (Socialist Federal Republic of Yugoslavia) Yugoslav First League – **4–1** (1974–75, 29 June 1975).
  - Away win in (Croatia) Prva HNL – **3–0** (1995–96, 17 February 1996), **3–0** (2011–12, 21 March 2012).
  - Home defeat in (Socialist Federal Republic of Yugoslavia) Yugoslav First League – **1–3** (1975–76, 13 September 1975), **0–2** (1962–63, 24 March 1963).
  - Home defeat in (Croatia) Prva HNL – **0–4** (2005–06, 22 April 2006).
  - Away defeat in (Socialist Federal Republic of Yugoslavia) Yugoslav First League – **0–4** (1962–63, 9 September 1962).
  - Away defeat in (Croatia) Prva HNL – **0–4** (2007–08, 22 September 2007).
- Longest winning streak:
  - Overall – **10 matches** (26 November 2000 to 12 March 2005).
  - Home – **7 matches** (23 November 1999 to 9 April 2005).
  - Away – **4 matches** (28 November 2001 to 12 March 2005).
- Longest losing streak:
  - Overall – **5 matches** (1 November 2015 to 5 November 2016).
  - Home – **4 matches** (18 April 2015 to 11 March 2017).
  - Away – **3 matches** (3 times).
- Longest unbeaten streak:
  - Overall – **12 matches** (3 November 1979 to 9 March 1986).
  - Home – **18 matches** (26 February 1978 to 12 December 1993).
  - Away – **6 matches** (30 July 1989 to 8 June 1994).
- Longest streak without a win:
  - Overall – **20 matches** (21 March 2012 to 2 December 2017).
  - Home – **11 matches** (7 August 2011 to **current**).
  - Away – **14 matches** (4 April 1976 to 10 October 1990).
- Longest drawing streak:
  - Overall – **3 matches** (1983–84; 2013).
  - Home – **4 matches** (2 December 2012 to 5 October 2014).
  - Away – **5 matches** (10 June 1981 to 18 November 1984).

Sources: hrnogomet.hr, hajduk.hr

=== Average attendance record on Poljud stadium ===
Note: records in gold were that seasons highest league average attendance.

**Yugoslav Football League**
1979–80	17,235	—
1980–81	12,353	▼
1981–82	16,529	▲
1982–83	15,353	▼
1983–84	13,353	▼
1984–85	12,941	▼
1985–86	8,882	▼
1986–87	16,353	▲
1987–88	7,850	▼
1988–89	9,618	▲
1989–90	8,787	▼
1990–91	4,821	▼
**Croatian Football League**
Season	Attendance (league only)	Change
1992	6,955	▲
1992–93	6,033	▼
1993–94	6,529	▲
1994–95	7,167	▲
1995–96	8,875	▲
1996–97	5,900	▼
1997–98	7,317	▲
1998–99	11,875	▲
1999–00	5,313	▼
2000–01	7,594	▲
2001–02	4,367	▼
2002–03	7,969	▲
2003–04	8,313	▲
2004–05	8,656	▲
2005–06	5,188	▼
2006–07	7,765	▲
2007–08	4,853	▼
2008–09	9,471	▲
2009–10	4,633	▼
2010–11	6,867	▲
2011–12	10,067	▲
2012–13	9,441	▼
2013–14	10,139	▲
2014–15	6,670	▼
2015–16	9,222	▲
2016–17	8,340	▼
2017–18	11,999	▲
2018–19	8,651	▼
2019–20	11,836	▲
2020–21	3,928	▼
2021–22	12,667	▲
2022–23	15,345	▲
2023–24	18,873	▲

Sources: hrnogomet.com

=== Penalty shoot-out history ===
Hajduk participated in 56 penalty shoot-outs, and holds a record of 33 wins, and 23 losses.

Season	Competition	Venue	Opponent	Full-time result	Shoot-out result
1957–58	Yugoslav Cup	Sombor	(Socialist Federal Republic of Yugoslavia) Radnički (S)	2–2	4–3
1962–63	Yugoslav Cup	Novi Sad	(Socialist Federal Republic of Yugoslavia) Vojvodina	2–2	5–3
1964–65	Yugoslav Cup	Split	(Socialist Federal Republic of Yugoslavia) HNK Šibenik	2–2	3–2
1965–66	Yugoslav Cup	Split	(Socialist Federal Republic of Yugoslavia) Dinamo Zagreb	0–0	3–4
1966–67	Yugoslav Cup	Split	(Socialist Federal Republic of Yugoslavia) Vardar	0–0	5–2
1969–70	Yugoslav Cup	Skopje	(Socialist Federal Republic of Yugoslavia) Vardar	1–1	3–2
1973–74	Yugoslav Cup	Sarajevo	(Socialist Federal Republic of Yugoslavia) Željezničar	1–1	4–3
1976–77	Yugoslav Cup	Banja Luka	(Socialist Federal Republic of Yugoslavia) Borac (BL)	1–1	3–2
	Yugoslav Cup	Split	(Socialist Federal Republic of Yugoslavia) Vardar	1–1	5–4
1977–78	Cup Winners' Cup	Split	(Hungary) Diósgyőri VTK	1–2 (3–3 Agg.)	4–3
	Cup Winners' Cup	Split	Austria Vienna	1–1 (2–2 Agg.)	0–3
1978–79	Yugoslav Cup	Split	(Socialist Federal Republic of Yugoslavia) Proleter (Z)	2–2	5–6
1981–82	Yugoslav Cup	Novi Sad	(Socialist Federal Republic of Yugoslavia) FK Novi Sad	1–1	5–4
1982–83	Yugoslav Cup	Raška	(Socialist Federal Republic of Yugoslavia) FC Garrison JNA	1–1	8–7
1983–84	UEFA Cup	Split	(Romania) Universitatea Craiova	1–0 (1–1 Agg.)	3–1
1985–86	Yugoslav Cup	Split	(Socialist Federal Republic of Yugoslavia) OFK Beograd	0–0	3–4
	UEFA Cup	Waregem	(Belgium) KSV Waregem	0–1 (1–1 Agg.)	4–5
1986–87	Yugoslav Cup	Belgrade	(Socialist Federal Republic of Yugoslavia) Red Star Belgrade	0–1 (2–2 Agg.)	5–4
	Yugoslav Cup	Belgrade	(Socialist Federal Republic of Yugoslavia) Rijeka	1–1	9–8
1987–88	Cup Winners' Cup	Split	(Denmark) Aalborg BK	1–0 (1–1 Agg.)	4–2
1988–89^{1}	Yugoslav Cup	Prizren	(Socialist Federal Republic of Yugoslavia) KF Liria	0–0	4–5
	Yugoslav League	Split	(Socialist Federal Republic of Yugoslavia) Partizan	2–2	0–2
	Yugoslav League	Kruševac	(Socialist Federal Republic of Yugoslavia) Napredak (K)	1–1	3–1
	Yugoslav League	Split	(Socialist Federal Republic of Yugoslavia) Red Star Belgrade	0–0	4–2
	Yugoslav League	Sarajevo	(Socialist Federal Republic of Yugoslavia) Željezničar	1–1	6–5
	Yugoslav League	Rijeka	(Socialist Federal Republic of Yugoslavia) Rijeka	0–0	3–1
	Yugoslav League	Niš	(Socialist Federal Republic of Yugoslavia) Radnički (N)	0–0	5–4
	Yugoslav League	Split	(Socialist Federal Republic of Yugoslavia) Vojvodina	0–0	2–4
	Yugoslav League	Skopje	(Socialist Federal Republic of Yugoslavia) Vardar	1–1	5–3
	Yugoslav League	Split	(Socialist Federal Republic of Yugoslavia) FK Rad	2–2	4–5
	Yugoslav League	Mostar	(Socialist Federal Republic of Yugoslavia) Velež Mostar	2–2	4–5
1989–90^{2}	Yugoslav Cup	Belgrade	(Socialist Federal Republic of Yugoslavia) FK Rad	0–0	7–6
	Yugoslav League	Tuzla	(Socialist Federal Republic of Yugoslavia) Sloboda (T)	2–2	6–5
	Yugoslav League	Split	(Socialist Federal Republic of Yugoslavia) Rijeka	1–1	5–6
	Yugoslav League	Split	(Socialist Federal Republic of Yugoslavia) Sarajevo	0–0	4–3
1990–91^{3}	Yugoslav League	Split	(Socialist Federal Republic of Yugoslavia) Željezničar	1–1	4–2
	Yugoslav League	Split	(Socialist Federal Republic of Yugoslavia) Rijeka	1–1	5–6
	Yugoslav League	Zagreb	(Socialist Federal Republic of Yugoslavia) Dinamo Zagreb	1–1	3–4
	Yugoslav League	Sarajevo	(Socialist Federal Republic of Yugoslavia) Sarajevo	1–1	2–4
	Yugoslav League	Split	(Socialist Federal Republic of Yugoslavia) Red Star Belgrade	1–1	3–5
	Yugoslav League	Mostar	(Socialist Federal Republic of Yugoslavia) Velež Mostar	1–1	3–1
	Yugoslav League	Rijeka	(Socialist Federal Republic of Yugoslavia) Rijeka	0–0	3–1
	Yugoslav League	Split	(Socialist Federal Republic of Yugoslavia) Borac (BL)	1–1	3–4
	Yugoslav League	Split	(Socialist Federal Republic of Yugoslavia) Vojvodina	1–1	2–4
1992–93	Super Cup	Zagreb	(Croatia) Inker Zaprešić	0–0	3–1
1994–95	Super Cup	Zagreb	Croatia Zagreb	0–1 (1–1 Agg.)	4–3
1995–96	Croatian Cup	Split	(Croatia) Marsonia	1–0 (1–1 Agg.)	2–4
1998–99	Croatian Cup	Split	(Croatia) Cibalia	2–1 (3–3 Agg.)	5–6
2001–02	Champions League	Split	(Hungary) Ferencváros	0–0 (0–0 Agg.)	6–5
2008–09	Croatian Cup	Koprivnica	(Croatia) Slaven Belupo	0–0 (0–0 Agg.)	6–5
	Croatian Cup	Split	(Croatia) Dinamo Zagreb	3–0 (3–3 Agg.)	3–4
2011–12	Croatian Cup	Zagreb	(Croatia) Zagreb	0–1 (1–1 Agg.)	5–6
2013–14	Super Cup	Zagreb	(Croatia) Dinamo Zagreb	1–1	1–4
2016–17	Europa League	Split	(Israel) Maccabi Tel Aviv	2–1 (3–3 Agg.)	3–4
2017–18	Croatian Cup	Zagreb	(Croatia) Lokomotiva Zagreb	1–1	4–2
2025–26	Croatian Cup	Vinkovci	(Croatia) Cibalia	0–0	4–2

^{1}During 1988–89 season teams in Yugoslav First League approached penalty shoot-out after every regular time tie.

^{2}During 1989–90 season teams in Yugoslav First League approached penalty shoot-out after every regular time tie.

^{3}During 1990–91 season teams in Yugoslav First League approached penalty shoot-out after every regular time tie.

Sources: Glasilo Hrvatskog nogometnog saveza
