= 1971–72 NK Hajduk Split season =

Hajduk Split
1971–72 season
- Chairman: Tito Kirigin
- Manager: Slavko Luštica; Tomislav Ivić
- First League: 10th
- Yugoslav Cup: Winners
- European Cup: First round
- Top goalscorer: League: Jurica Jerković (9); All: Jurica Jerković (10)

The 1971–72 season was the 61st season in Hajduk Split’s history and their 26th season in the Yugoslav First League. Their 1st place finish in the 1970–71 season meant it was their 26th successive season playing in the Yugoslav First League.

== Competitions ==
=== Overall ===
Competition	Started round	Final result	First match	Last Match
1971–72 Yugoslav First League	–	10th	22 August	11 June
1971–72 Yugoslav Cup	First round	Winners	23 February	17 June
1971–72 European Cup	First round		15 September	29 September

=== Yugoslav First League ===
==== Classification ====
Pos	Team	Pld	W	D	L	GF	GA	GD	Pts	Qualification or relegation
8	Dinamo Zagreb	34	11	10	13	47	40	+7	32	
9	Olimpija	34	13	5	16	46	51	−5	31	
10	Hajduk Split	34	12	7	15	45	56	−11	31	Qualification for Cup Winners' Cup first round
11	Vardar	34	8	14	12	31	44	−13	30	
12	Čelik	34	9	12	13	27	40	−13	30	

Source: rsssf.org
Rules for classification: 1) points; 2) goal difference; 3) number of goals scored.

== Matches ==
=== First League ===
Round	Date	Venue	Opponent	Score	Hajduk Scorers
1	22 Aug	H	OFK Beograd	0 – 3	
2	29 Aug	A	Sutjeska	0 – 3	
3	5 Sep	H	Velež	3 – 1	Hlevnjak, Jovanić, Nadoveza
4	12 Sep	A	Olimpija	0 – 1	
5	19 Sep	H	Vojvodina	2 – 3	Džoni, Nadoveza
6	26 Sep	A	Željezničar	1 – 2	Boljat
7	3 Oct	H	Partizan	2 – 1	Hlevnjak, Šurjak
8	6 Oct	A	Radnički Kragujevac	1 – 0	Šurjak
9	10 Oct	H	Maribor	2 – 1	Mužinić, Šurjak
10	24 Oct	A	Sloboda	0 – 4	
11	31 Oct	H	Radnički Niš	4 – 1	Jerković (2), Jovanić (2)
12	7 Nov	A	Čelik Zenica	0 – 0	
13	14 Nov	H	Borac Banja Luka	2 – 1	Jerković, Šimek
14	21 Nov	H	Sarajevo	3 – 1	Gluić, Jerković, Šurjak
15	28 Nov	A	Dinamo Zagreb	0 – 1	
16	5 Dec	H	Red Star	2 – 1	Mužinić, Šimek
17	12 Dec	A	Vardar	1 – 1	Gluić
18	27 Feb	A	OFK Beograd	0 – 0	
19	5 Mar	H	Sutjeska	2 – 0	Jerković (2)
20	12 Mar	A	Velež	1 – 4	Šurjak
21	19 Mar	H	Olimpija	1 – 3	Hlevnjak
22	26 Mar	A	Vojvodina	5 – 1	Jerković (2), Jovanić, Mužinić, Nadoveza
23	16 Apr	H	Radnički Kragujevac	3 – 2	Hlevnjak, Mužinić, Pavlica
24	19 Apr	H	Željezničar	1 – 1	Jovanić
25	25 Apr	A	Maribor	1 – 1	Hlevnjak
26	2 May	A	Partizan	1 – 1	Bošković
27	7 May	H	Sloboda	0 – 1	
28	17 May	A	Radnički Niš	1 – 3	Jerković
29	21 May	H	Čelik	1 – 0	Hlevnjak
30	28 May	A	Borac Banja Luka	1 – 3	Mužinić
31	31 May	A	Sarajevo	0 – 1	
32	4 Jun	H	Dinamo Zagreb	1 – 5	Nadoveza
33	7 Jun	A	Red Star	2 – 5	Šurjak, Žutelija
34	11 Jun	H	Vardar	1 – 1	Šurjak

Source: hajduk.hr

=== Yugoslav Cup ===
Round	Date	Venue	Opponent	Score	Hajduk Scorers
R1	23 Feb	H	RNK Split	6 – 1	Gluić (2), Šimek (2), Hlevnjak, Jovanić
R2	1 Mar	H	Sloboda	1 – 0	Šimek
QF	15 Mar	A	Radnički Niš	3 – 2	Bošković, Hlevnjak, Jerković
SF	24 May	A	Olimpija	2 – 0	Jovanić, Nadoveza
Final	17 Jun	N	Dinamo Zagreb	2 – 1	Jovanić, Šurjak

Sources: hajduk.hr

=== European Cup ===
Round	Date	Venue	Opponent	Score	Hajduk Scorers
R1	15 Sep	A (Spain)	Valencia (Spain)	0 – 0	
R1	29 Sep	H	Valencia (Spain)	1 – 1	Pérez (o.g.)

Source: hajduk.hr

== Player seasonal records ==
=== Top scorers ===
Rank	Name	League	Europe	Cup	Total
1	(Socialist Federal Republic of Yugoslavia) Jurica Jerković	9	–	1	10
2	(Socialist Federal Republic of Yugoslavia) Ivan Hlevnjak	6	–	2	8
2	(Socialist Federal Republic of Yugoslavia) Mićun Jovanić	5	–	3	8
2	(Socialist Federal Republic of Yugoslavia) Ivica Šurjak	7	–	1	8
6	(Socialist Federal Republic of Yugoslavia) Dražen Mužinić	5	–	–	5
6	(Socialist Federal Republic of Yugoslavia) Petar Nadoveza	4	–	1	5
6	(Socialist Federal Republic of Yugoslavia) Vlatko Šimek	2	–	3	5
9	(Socialist Federal Republic of Yugoslavia) Joško Gluić	2	–	2	4
10	(Socialist Federal Republic of Yugoslavia) Miroslav Bošković	1	–	1	2
11	(Socialist Federal Republic of Yugoslavia) Mario Boljat	1	–	–	1
11	(Socialist Federal Republic of Yugoslavia) Vilson Džoni	1	–	–	1
11	(Socialist Federal Republic of Yugoslavia) Ivan Pavlica	1	–	–	1
11	(Socialist Federal Republic of Yugoslavia) Dinko Žutelija	1	–	–	1
	Own goals	–	1	–	1
	TOTALS	45	1	14	60

Source: Competitive matches

== See also ==
- 1971–72 Yugoslav First League
- 1971–72 Yugoslav Cup

== External sources ==
- 1971–72 Yugoslav First League at rsssf.com
- 1971–72 Yugoslav Cup at rsssf.com
- 1971–72 European Cup at rsssf.com
- 1971–72 Yugoslav First League at historical-lineups.com
