= 1975–76 NK Hajduk Split season =

Hajduk Split
1975–76 season
- Chairman: Tito Kirigin
- Manager: Tomislav Ivić
- First League: 2nd
- Yugoslav Cup: Winners
- European Cup: Quarter-finals
- Top goalscorer: League: Slaviša Žungul (14); All: Slaviša Žungul (20)
- Highest home attendance: 30,000 (Two matches)
- Lowest home attendance: 6,000 v Čelik Zenica, 5 June 1976

The 1975–76 season was the 65th season in Hajduk Split's history and their 30th season in the Yugoslav First League. Their 1st-place finish in the 1974–75 season meant it was their 30th successive season playing in the Yugoslav First League.

== Competitions ==
=== Overall ===
Competition	Started round	Final result	First match	Last Match
1975–76 Yugoslav First League	–	1st	16 August	11 July
1975–76 Yugoslav Cup	First round	Winners	14 August	25 May
1975–76 European Cup	First round	Quarter-finals	17 September	17 March

=== Yugoslav First League ===
==== Classification ====
Pos	Team	Pld	W	D	L	GF	GA	GD	Pts	Qualification or relegation
1	Partizan (C)	34	22	6	6	60	30	+30	50	Qualification for European Cup first round
2	Hajduk Split	34	19	11	4	57	22	+35	49	Qualification for Cup Winners' Cup first round
3	Dinamo Zagreb	34	17	10	7	38	23	+15	44	Qualification for UEFA Cup first round
4	Red Star Belgrade	34	16	8	10	53	31	+22	40	Qualification for UEFA Cup first round
5	Vojvodina	34	11	12	11	41	42	−1	34	Qualification for Intertoto Cup

Source: rsssf.org
Rules for classification: 1) points; 2) goal difference; 3) number of goals scored.
(C) Champions

==== Results summary ====
Overall								Home						Away					
Pld	W	D	L	GF	GA	GD	Pts	W	D	L	GF	GA	GD	W	D	L	GF	GA	GD
34	19	11	4	57	22	+35	68	13	2	2	36	9	+27	6	9	2	21	13	+8

==== Results by round ====
Round	1	2	3	4	5	6	7	8	9	10	11	12	13	14	15	16	17	18	19	20	21	22	23	24	25	26	27	28	29	30	31	32	33	34
Ground	A	H	A	H	A	H	A	H	A	H	A	H	A	A	H	A	H	H	A	H	A	H	A	H	A	H	A	H	A	H	H	A	H	A
Result	D	D	W	W	W	L	D	W	W	L	W	W	D	L	W	D	W	D	D	W	L	W	W	W	D	W	W	W	D	W	W	D	W	D
Position	8	10	7	3	2	3	3	2	2	3	3	3	3	4	3	4	3	3	3	3	4	3	3	3	3	3	2	1	2	1	1	1	1	2

Source: Competitive matches
A = Away; H = Home; W = Win; D = Draw; L = Loss

== Matches ==
=== First League ===
Round	Date	Venue	Opponent	Score	Attendance	Hajduk Scorers
1	16 Aug	A	Vojvodina	0–0	25,000	
2	24 Aug	H	Velež	0–0	27,000	
3	27 Aug	A	Budućnost	2–1	20,000	Žungul (2)
4	31 Aug	H	Olimpija	2–1	20,000	Jerković (2)
5	7 Sep	A	Dinamo Zagreb	1–0	60,000	Blašković (o.g.)
6	13 Sep	H	Rijeka	1–3	20,000	Peruzović
7	21 Sep	A	Radnički Niš	0–0	15,000	
8	27 Sep	H	Željezničar	5–1	15,000	Mijač (2), Jerković, Šurjak, Žungul
9	5 Oct	A	Red Star	1–0	70,000	Jerković
10	8 Oct	H	Partizan	0–1	30,000	
11	19 Oct	A	Borac Banja Luka	2–0	15,000	Žungul, Peruzović
12	26 Oct	H	Radnički Kragujevac	2–0	15,000	Šurjak, Žungul
13	1 Nov	A	Čelik	0–0	8,000	
14	8 Nov	A	Vardar	1–2	7,000	Šurjak
15	23 Nov	H	Sloboda	4–0	10,000	Šurjak, Jovanić, Buljan, Balevski
16	3 Dec	A	Sarajevo	0–0	12,000	
17	6 Dec	H	OFK Beograd	4–2	10,000	Jerković (2), Mijač, Šurjak
18	7 Mar	H	Vojvodina	0–0	20,000	
19	13 Mar	A	Velež	2–2	13,000	Žungul, Đorđević
20	21 Mar	H	Budućnost	2–0	12,000	Žungul, Đorđević
21	25 Mar	A	Olimpija	2–4	6,000	Đorđević, Žungul
22	28 Mar	H	Dinamo Zagreb	2–1	25,000	Mijač, Žungul
23	4 Apr	A	Rijeka	2–1	20,000	Jerković (2)
24	11 Apr	H	Radnički Niš	1–0	10,000	Jovanić
25	2 May	A	Željezničar	0–0	20,000	
26	5 May	H	Red Star	1–0	30,000	Jerković
27	9 May	A	Partizan	6–1	50,000	Žungul (2), Đorđević (2), Buljan, Jerković
28	30 May	H	Borac Banja Luka	3–0	20,000	Đorđević, Jerković, Žungul
29	2 Jun	A	Radnički Kragujevac	0–0	16,000	
30	5 Jun	H	Čelik	3–0	6,000	Šurjak (2), Đorđević
31	27 Jun	H	Vardar	2–0	13,000	Jerković, Žungul
32	30 Jun	A	Sloboda	1–1	15,000	Žungul
33	4 Jul	H	Sarajevo	4–0	22,000	Buljan (2), Đorđević, Mužinić
34	11 Jul	A	OFK Beograd	1–1	20,000	Peruzović

Source: hajduk.hr

=== Yugoslav Cup ===
Round	Date	Venue	Opponent	Score	Attendance	Hajduk Scorers
R1	3 Sep	A	Olimpija	1–0	15,000	Buljan
R2	23 Sep	A	Radnički Niš	6–1	4,000	Mužinić (2), Šurjak, Jovanić, Jerković, Žungul
QF	28 Feb	H	Šumadija Aranđelovac	1–0	10,000	Mijač
SF	7 Apr	H	Famos Hrasnica	2–0	10,000	Jerković, Mijač
Final	25 May	N	Dinamo Zagreb	1–0 (a.e.t.)	60,000	Šurjak

Sources: hajduk.hr

=== European Cup ===
Round	Date	Venue	Opponent	Score	Attendance	Hajduk Scorers
R1	17 Sep	A (Malta)	Floriana (Malta)	5–0	4,413	Žungul (3), Buljan, Šurjak
R1	1 Oct	H	Floriana (Malta)	3–0	6,159	Buljan, Šalov, Đorđević
R2	22 Oct	H	Molenbeek (Belgium)	4–0	22,224	Žungul, Rožić, Šurjak, Mijač
R2	5 Nov	A (Belgium)	Molenbeek (Belgium)	3–2	4,586	Jovanić
QF	3 Mar	H	PSV Eindhoven (Belgium)	2–0	23,203	Jerković (2), Žungul, Mijač
QF	17 Mar	A (France)	PSV Eindhoven (Belgium)	0–3 (a.e.t.)	16,815	

Source: hajduk.hr

== Player seasonal records ==
=== Top scorers ===
Rank	Name	League	Europe	Cup	Total
1	(Socialist Federal Republic of Yugoslavia) Slaviša Žungul	14	5	1	20
2	(Socialist Federal Republic of Yugoslavia) Jurica Jerković	12	–	2	14
3	(Socialist Federal Republic of Yugoslavia) Ivica Šurjak	7	4	2	13
4	(Socialist Federal Republic of Yugoslavia) Boriša Đorđević	8	1	–	9
5	(Socialist Federal Republic of Yugoslavia) Željko Mijač	4	2	2	8
6	(Socialist Federal Republic of Yugoslavia) Ivan Buljan	4	2	1	7
7	(Socialist Federal Republic of Yugoslavia) Mićun Jovanić	2	1	2	5
8	(Socialist Federal Republic of Yugoslavia) Luka Peruzović	3	–	–	3
9	(Socialist Federal Republic of Yugoslavia) Vančo Balevski	1	–	–	1
9	(Socialist Federal Republic of Yugoslavia) Dražen Mužinić	1	–	–	1
9	(Socialist Federal Republic of Yugoslavia) Vedran Rožić	–	1	–	1
9	(Socialist Federal Republic of Yugoslavia) Nenad Šalov	–	1	–	1
	Own goals	1	–	–	1
	TOTALS	57	17	11	84

Source: Competitive matches

== See also ==
- 1975–76 Yugoslav First League
- 1975–76 Yugoslav Cup

== External sources ==
- 1975–76 Yugoslav First League at rsssf.com
- 1975–76 Yugoslav Cup at rsssf.com
- 1975–76 European Cup at rsssf.com
- 1975–76 Yugoslav First League at historical-lineups.com
