= 1972–73 NK Hajduk Split season =

Hajduk Split
1972–73 season
- Chairman: Tito Kirigin
- Manager: Branko Zebec
- First League: 9th
- Cup Winners' Cup: Semi-finals
- Top goalscorer: League: Petar Nadoveza (19); All: Petar Nadoveza (23)

The 1972–73 season was the 62nd season in Hajduk Split’s history and their 27th season in the Yugoslav First League. Their 10th place finish in the 1971–72 season meant it was their 27th successive season playing in the Yugoslav First League.

== Competitions ==
=== Overall ===
Competition	Started round	Final result	First match	Last Match
1972–73 Yugoslav First League	–	9th	20 August	24 June
1972–73 European Cup Winners' Cup	First round	Semi-finals	13 September	25 April

=== Yugoslav First League ===
==== Classification ====
Pos	Team	Pld	W	D	L	GF	GA	GD	Pts	Qualification or relegation
7	Sarajevo	34	12	10	12	48	50	−2	34	
8	Dinamo Zagreb	34	11	11	12	39	47	−8	33	Qualification for Cup Winners' Cup first round
9	Hajduk Split	34	14	3	17	50	50	0	31	
10	Vardar (Note: Vardar was invited to the Balkans Cup.)	34	10	11	13	35	50	−15	31	
11	Radnički Niš	34	10	10	14	24	40	−16	30	

Source: rsssf.org
Rules for classification: 1) points; 2) goal difference; 3) number of goals scored.

==== Results summary ====
Overall								Home						Away					
Pld	W	D	L	GF	GA	GD	Pts	W	D	L	GF	GA	GD	W	D	L	GF	GA	GD
34	14	3	17	50	50	0	45	13	3	1	45	8	+37	1	0	16	5	42	−37

==== Results by round ====
Round	1	2	3	4	5	6	7	8	9	10	11	12	13	14	15	16	17	18	19	20	21	22	23	24	25	26	27	28	29	30	31	32	33	34
Ground	A	H	A	H	A	H	A	H	A	H	A	H	A	H	A	A	H	H	A	H	A	H	A	H	A	H	A	H	A	H	A	H	H	A
Result	L	W	L	D	L	W	L	W	L	W	L	W	L	W	L	L	W	L	L	D	L	W	L	W	L	W	L	W	W	W	L	W	D	L

Source: Competitive matches
A = Away; H = Home; W = Win; D = Draw; L = Loss

== Matches ==
=== First League ===
Round	Date	Venue	Opponent	Score	Hajduk Scorers
1	20 Aug	A	Velež	0 – 1	
2	27 Aug	H	Željezničar	3 – 2	Nadoveza (3)
3	30 Aug	A	Spartak Subotica	0 – 1	
4	3 Sep	H	Borac Banja Luka	1 – 1	Džoni
5	9 Sep	A	Čelik	1 – 2	Nadoveza
6	17 Sep	H	Bor	4 – 0	Nadoveza (2), Šurjak, Jerković
7	24 Sep	A	Olimpija	0 – 4	
8	1 Oct	H	Sutjeska	3 – 0	Hlevnjak, Jovanić, Nadoveza
9	8 Oct	A	Partizan	1 – 2	Jerković
10	22 Oct	H	OFK Beograd	1 – 0	Šurjak
11	29 Oct	A	Sarajevo	0 – 2	
12	1 Nov	H	Vardar	5 – 0	Buljan, Nadoveza, Šurjak, Hlevnjak, Jovanić
13	5 Nov	A	Sloboda	0 – 2	
14	26 Nov	H	Radnički Niš	2 – 0	Nadoveza (2)
15	3 Dec	A	Vojvodina	0 – 2	
16	10 Dec	A	Dinamo Zagreb	0 – 1	
17	17 Dec	H	Red Star	2 – 0	Šurjak, Nadoveza
18	4 Mar	H	Velež	0 – 3	
19	11 Mar	A	Željezničar	1 – 4	Peruzović
20	18 Mar	H	Spartak Subotica	2 – 2	Buljan, Hlevnjak
21	26 Mar	A	Borac Banja Luka	0 – 2	
22	1 Apr	H	Čelik	3 – 0	Jerković (3)
23	8 Apr	A	Bor	0 – 3	
24	15 Apr	H	Olimpija	2 – 1	Jerković, Nadoveza
25	22 Apr	A	Sutjeska	0 – 2	
26	29 Apr	H	Partizan	3 – 2	Nadoveza, Hlevnjak, Jerković
27	2 May	A	OFK Beograd	0 – 2	
28	16 May	H	Sarajevo	2 – 1	Šurjak, Hlevnjak
29	20 May	A	Vardar	2 – 1	Hlevnjak, Jerković
30	27 May	H	Sloboda	4 – 0	Nadoveza (3), Bošković
31	3 Jun	A	Radnički Niš	0 – 1	
32	10 Jun	H	Vojvodina	7 – 0	Nadoveza (2), Jerković (2), Jovanić, Bošković, Šurjak
33	17 Jun	H	Dinamo Zagreb	1 – 1	Nadoveza
34	24 Jun	A	Red Star	0 – 2	

Source: hajduk.hr

=== Cup Winners' Cup ===
Round	Date	Venue	Opponent	Score	Hajduk Scorers
R1	13 Sep	H	Fredrikstad (Norway)	1 – 0	Nadoveza
R1	27 Sep	A (Norway)	Fredrikstad (Norway)	1 – 0	Nadoveza
R2	25 Oct	A (Wales)	Wrexham (Wales)	1 – 3	Jovanić
R2	8 Nov	H	Wrexham (Wales)	2 – 0	Nadoveza (2)
QF	7 Mar	A (Scotland)	Hibernian (Scotland)	2 – 4	Hlevnjak (2)
QF	21 Mar	H	Hibernian (Scotland)	3 – 0	Šurjak, Hlevnjak, Blackley (o.g.)
SF	11 Apr	A (England)	Leeds United (England)	0 – 1	
SF	25 Apr	H	Leeds United (England)	0 – 0	

Sources: hajduk.hr

== Player seasonal records ==
=== Top scorers ===
Rank	Name	League	Europe	Total
1	(Socialist Federal Republic of Yugoslavia) Petar Nadoveza	19	4	23
2	(Socialist Federal Republic of Yugoslavia) Jurica Jerković	10	–	10
3	(Socialist Federal Republic of Yugoslavia) Ivan Hlevnjak	6	3	9
4	(Socialist Federal Republic of Yugoslavia) Ivica Šurjak	6	1	7
5	(Socialist Federal Republic of Yugoslavia) Mićun Jovanić	3	1	4
6	(Socialist Federal Republic of Yugoslavia) Miroslav Bošković	2	–	2
6	(Socialist Federal Republic of Yugoslavia) Ivan Buljan	2	–	2
8	(Socialist Federal Republic of Yugoslavia) Vilson Džoni	1	–	1
8	(Socialist Federal Republic of Yugoslavia) Luka Peruzović	1	–	1
	Own goals	–	1	1
	TOTALS	50	10	60

Source: Competitive matches

== See also ==
- 1972–73 Yugoslav First League

== External sources ==
- 1972–73 Yugoslav First League at rsssf.com
- 1972–73 European Cup Winners' Cup at rsssf.com
- 1972–73 Yugoslav First League at historical-lineups.com
