= 1973–74 NK Hajduk Split season =

Hajduk Split
1973–74 season
- Chairman: Tito Kirigin
- Manager: Tomislav Ivić
- First League: 1st
- Yugoslav Cup: Winners
- Top goalscorer: League: Slaviša Žungul (12); All: Slaviša Žungul (17)

The 1974–75 season was the 63rd season in Hajduk Split’s history and their 28th season in the Yugoslav First League. Their 8th place finish in the 1972–73 season meant it was their 28th successive season playing in the Yugoslav First League.

== Competitions ==
=== Overall ===
| Competition | Started round | Final result | First match | Last Match |
|---|---|---|---|---|
| 1973–74 Yugoslav First League | – | 1st | 19 August | 17 May |
| 1973 Yugoslav Cup | First round | Winners | 12 August | 28 November |

=== Yugoslav First League ===
==== Classification ====
| Pos | Team | Pld | W | D | L | GF | GA | GD | Pts | Qualification or relegation |
|---|---|---|---|---|---|---|---|---|---|---|
| 1 | Hajduk Split (C) | 34 | 18 | 9 | 7 | 52 | 24 | +28 | 45 | Qualification for European Cup first round |
| 2 | Velež | 34 | 19 | 7 | 8 | 54 | 34 | +20 | 45 | Qualification for UEFA Cup first round |
| 3 | Red Star Belgrade | 34 | 19 | 5 | 10 | 72 | 46 | +26 | 43 | Qualification for Cup Winners' Cup first round |
| 4 | Partizan | 34 | 12 | 13 | 9 | 41 | 33 | +8 | 37 | Qualification for UEFA Cup first round |
| 5 | OFK Belgrade | 34 | 13 | 9 | 12 | 35 | 32 | +3 | 35 | |

Source: rsssf.org
Rules for classification: 1) points; 2) goal difference; 3) number of goals scored.
(C) Champions

== Matches ==
=== First League ===
| Round | Date | Venue | Opponent | Score | Hajduk Scorers |
|---|---|---|---|---|---|
| 1 | 19 Aug | A | Vojvodina | 1 – 0 | Jerković |
| 2 | 26 Aug | H | Dinamo Zagreb | 2 – 3 | Jerković (2) |
| 3 | 2 Sep | A | Bor | 0 – 1 | |
| 4 | 9 Sep | H | Radnički Niš | 2 – 0 | Jurišić, Šurjak |
| 5 | 12 Sep | A | Čelik | 1 – 1 | Jurišić |
| 6 | 16 Sep | H | Sarajevo | 1 – 0 | Žungul |
| 7 | 23 Sep | A | Proleter Zrenjanin | 2 – 1 | Matković, Šurjak |
| 8 | 30 Sep | H | Velež | 2 – 2 | Matković, Žungul |
| 9 | 7 Oct | A | Partizan | 1 – 1 | Šurjak |
| 10 | 28 Oct | H | Sloboda | 4 – 1 | Jerković, Jovanić, Oblak, Šurjak |
| 11 | 31 Oct | A | NK Zagreb | 0 – 1 | |
| 12 | 4 Nov | H | Vardar | 6 – 0 | Jerković (2), Šurjak (2), Buljan, Oblak |
| 13 | 11 Nov | A | Olimpija | 1 – 1 | Jovanić |
| 14 | 18 Nov | A | Red Star | 1 – 3 | Žungul |
| 15 | 25 Nov | H | Željezničar | 1 – 1 | Buljan |
| 16 | 1 Dec | A | Borac Banja Luka | 0 – 0 | |
| 17 | 9 Dec | H | OFK Beograd | 2 – 0 | Jovanić, Žungul |
| 18 | 24 Feb | H | Vojvodina | 3 – 0 | Peruzović, Šurjak, Žungul |
| 19 | 3 Mar | A | Dinamo Zagreb | 1 – 0 | Jerković |
| 20 | 10 Mar | H | Bor | 3 – 0 | Žungul (2), Mužinić |
| 21 | 16 Mar | A | Radnički Niš | 1 – 0 | Mužinić |
| 22 | 23 Mar | H | Čelik | 1 – 0 | Boljat |
| 23 | 27 Mar | A | Sarajevo | 0 – 1 | |
| 24 | 31 Mar | H | Proleter Zrenjanin | 2 – 1 | Jerković, Oblak |
| 25 | 3 Apr | A | Velež | 0 – 1 | |
| 26 | 7 Apr | H | Partizan | 1 – 2 | Džoni |
| 27 | 14 Apr | A | Sloboda | 0 – 0 | |
| 28 | 21 Apr | H | NK Zagreb | 2 – 1 | Mijač, Žungul |
| 29 | 24 Apr | A | Vardar | 0 – 0 | |
| 30 | 28 Apr | H | Sarajevo | 1 – 0 | Žungul |
| 31 | 1 May | H | Red Star | 4 – 1 | Žungul (2), Oblak, Šurjak |
| 32 | 5 May | A | Željezničar | 0 – 0 | |
| 33 | 12 May | H | Borac Banja Luka | 4 – 1 | Matković, Mijač, Oblak, Žungul |
| 34 | 14 May | A | OFK Beograd | 2 – 0 | Džoni, Jerković |

Source: hajduk.hr

=== Yugoslav Cup ===
| Round | Date | Venue | Opponent | Score | Hajduk Scorers |
|---|---|---|---|---|---|
| R1 | 12 Aug | H | Vardar | 5 – 1 | Jerković, Oblak, Mijač, Šurjak, Poldrugovac |
| R2 | 29 Aug | A | RNK Split | 5 – 0 | Mijač (3), Jurišić (2) |
| QF | 3 Oct | H | Borac Banja Luka | 3 – 0 | Žungul (2), Jerković |
| SF | 14 Nov | A | Željezničar | 1 – 1 (4 – 3 p) | Žungul |
| Final | 21 Nov | H | Red Star | 1 – 1 | Žungul |
| Final | 28 Nov | A | Red Star | 2 – 1 | Jerković, Žungul |

Sources: hajduk.hr

== Player seasonal records ==
=== Top scorers ===
| Rank | Name | League | Cup | Total |
|---|---|---|---|---|
| 1 | (Socialist Federal Republic of Yugoslavia) Slaviša Žungul | 12 | 5 | 17 |
| 2 | (Socialist Federal Republic of Yugoslavia) Jurica Jerković | 9 | 4 | 13 |
| 3 | (Socialist Federal Republic of Yugoslavia) Ivica Šurjak | 8 | – | 8 |
| 4 | (Socialist Federal Republic of Yugoslavia) Željko Mijač | 2 | 4 | 6 |
| 4 | (Socialist Federal Republic of Yugoslavia) Branko Oblak | 5 | 1 | 6 |
| 6 | (Socialist Federal Republic of Yugoslavia) Goran Jurišić | 2 | 2 | 4 |
| 7 | (Socialist Federal Republic of Yugoslavia) Mićun Jovanić | 3 | – | 3 |
| 7 | (Socialist Federal Republic of Yugoslavia) Ivica Matković | 3 | – | 3 |
| 9 | (Socialist Federal Republic of Yugoslavia) Ivan Buljan | 2 | – | 2 |
| 9 | (Socialist Federal Republic of Yugoslavia) Vilson Džoni | 2 | – | 2 |
| 9 | (Socialist Federal Republic of Yugoslavia) Dražen Mužinić | 2 | – | 2 |
| 12 | (Socialist Federal Republic of Yugoslavia) Mario Boljat | 1 | – | 1 |
| 12 | (Socialist Federal Republic of Yugoslavia) Luka Peruzović | 1 | – | 1 |
| 12 | (Socialist Federal Republic of Yugoslavia) Berislav Poldrugovac | – | 1 | 1 |
| | TOTALS | 52 | 17 | 69 |

Source: Competitive matches

== See also ==
- 1973–74 Yugoslav First League
- 1973 Yugoslav Cup

== External sources ==
- 1973–74 Yugoslav First League at rsssf.com
- 1973 Yugoslav Cup at rsssf.com
- 1973–74 Yugoslav First League at historical-lineups.com
