= 1971–72 Yugoslav Cup =

1972 Yugoslav Football Cup
25th Marshal Tito Cup
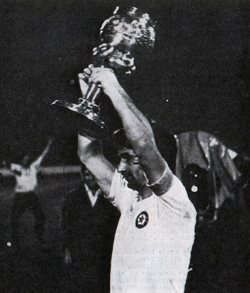
- Dragan Holcer, captain of Hajduk Split, with the Yugoslavia Cup 1971-1972

Tournament details
- Country: Yugoslavia
- Dates: 1 March – 17 June
- Teams: 16

Final positions
- Champions: Hajduk Split (2nd title)
- Runners-up: Dinamo Zagreb
- Cup Winners' Cup: Hajduk Split

Tournament statistics
- Matches played: 15
- Goals scored: 34 (2.27 per match)
- Goals scored in penalty shoot-outs not included.

The 1971–72 Yugoslav Cup was the 25th season of the top football knockout competition in SFR Yugoslavia, the Yugoslav Cup (Serbo-Croatian: Kup Jugoslavije), also known as the "Marshal Tito Cup" (Kup Maršala Tita), since its establishment in 1946.

== Round of 16 ==
In the following tables winning teams are marked in bold; teams from outside top level are marked in italic script.

Tie no	Home team	Score	Away team
1	**Borac Čačak**	4–0	Hajduk Kula
2	**Borovo**	1–0	Proleter Zrenjanin
3	**Dinamo Zagreb**	1–0	Sarajevo
4	**Hajduk Split**	1–0	Sloboda Tuzla
5	Prishtina	1–1 (4–5 p)	**Radnički Niš**
6	Radnički Kragujevac	0–1	**Red Star**
7	Rijeka	0–1	**Olimpija Ljubljana**
8	Sutjeska Nikšić	1–2	**Vardar**

== Quarter-finals ==
Tie no	Home team	Score	Away team
1	Borovo	1–2	**Dinamo Zagreb**
2	**Olimpija Ljubljana**	2–1 (a.e.t.)	Red Star
3	Radnički Niš	2–3	**Hajduk Split**
4	**Vardar**	2–1 (a.e.t.)	Borac Čačak

== Semi-finals ==
Tie no	Home team	Score	Away team
1	**Dinamo Zagreb**	1–0	Vardar
2	Olimpija Ljubljana	0–2	**Hajduk Split**

== Final ==
17 June 1972

Hajduk Split	2–1	Dinamo Zagreb
Jovanić 45'; Šurjak 59'		Senzen 55'

JNA Stadium, Belgrade
Attendance: 15,000
Referee: Marijan Rauš (Varaždin)

HAJDUK SPLIT:
GK	1	(Socialist Federal Republic of Yugoslavia) Ante Sirković
DF	2	(Socialist Federal Republic of Yugoslavia) Vilson Džoni
MF	3	(Socialist Federal Republic of Yugoslavia) Ivan Hlevnjak
DF	4	(Socialist Federal Republic of Yugoslavia) Dragan Holcer
DF	5	(Socialist Federal Republic of Yugoslavia) Ivan Buljan
DF	6	(Socialist Federal Republic of Yugoslavia) Miroslav Bošković
FW	7	(Socialist Federal Republic of Yugoslavia) Mićun Jovanić
MF	8	(Socialist Federal Republic of Yugoslavia) Dražen Mužinić
FW	9	(Socialist Federal Republic of Yugoslavia) Petar Nadoveza
FW	10	(Socialist Federal Republic of Yugoslavia) Jurica Jerković
MF	11	(Socialist Federal Republic of Yugoslavia) Ivica Šurjak
Manager:
(Socialist Federal Republic of Yugoslavia) Tomislav Ivić

DINAMO ZAGREB:
GK	**1**	(Socialist Federal Republic of Yugoslavia) Fahrija Dautbegović
DF	**2**	(Socialist Federal Republic of Yugoslavia) Branko Gračanin
DF	**3**	(Socialist Federal Republic of Yugoslavia) Damir Valec
DF	**4**	(Socialist Federal Republic of Yugoslavia) Denijal Pirić
DF	**5**	(Socialist Federal Republic of Yugoslavia) Ivica Miljković
MF	**6**	(Socialist Federal Republic of Yugoslavia) Josip Gucmirtl
FW	**7**	(Socialist Federal Republic of Yugoslavia) Ivica Senzen
MF	**8**	(Socialist Federal Republic of Yugoslavia) Josip Lalić
MF	**9**	(Socialist Federal Republic of Yugoslavia) Slavko Kovačić
FW	**10**	(Socialist Federal Republic of Yugoslavia) Drago Vabec
FW	**11**	(Socialist Federal Republic of Yugoslavia) Zdenko Kafka	Substituted off
Substitutes:
FW	?	(Socialist Federal Republic of Yugoslavia) Fikret Mujkić	Substituted on
Manager:
(Socialist Federal Republic of Yugoslavia) Dražan Jerković

== See also ==
- 1971–72 Yugoslav First League
- 1971–72 Yugoslav Second League
