= 1980–81 NK Hajduk Split season =

Hajduk Split
1980–81 season
- Chairman: Ante Skataretiko; Ivo Šantić
- Manager: Ante Mladinić
- First League: 2nd
- Yugoslav Cup: First round
- Top goalscorer: Zlatko Vujović (12)
- Highest home attendance: 35,000 v Dinamo Zagreb, 5 April 1981
- Lowest home attendance: 4,000 v Rijeka, 30 November 1980

The 1980–81 season was the 70th season in Hajduk Split’s history and their 35th in the Yugoslav First League. Their 5th place finish in the 1979–80 season meant it was their 35th successive season playing in the Yugoslav First League.

== Competitions ==
=== Overall ===
Competition	Started round	Final result	First match	Last Match
1980–81 Yugoslav First League	–	2nd	17 August	14 June
1980–81 Yugoslav Cup	First round		15 October	

=== Yugoslav First League ===
==== Classification ====
Pos	Team	Pld	W	D	L	GF	GA	GD	Pts	Qualification or relegation
1	Red Star Belgrade (C)	34	15	14	5	62	31	+31	44	Qualification for European Cup first round
2	Hajduk Split	34	16	10	8	57	36	+21	42	Qualification for UEFA Cup first round
3	Radnički Niš	34	13	15	6	39	28	+11	41	Qualification for UEFA Cup first round
4	Sloboda Tuzla	34	14	8	12	46	51	−5	36	Qualification for Balkans Cup
5	Dinamo Zagreb	34	12	11	11	44	38	+6	35	

Source: rsssf.org
Rules for classification: 1) points; 2) goal difference; 3) number of goals scored.
(C) Champions

==== Results summary ====
Overall								Home						Away					
Pld	W	D	L	GF	GA	GD	Pts	W	D	L	GF	GA	GD	W	D	L	GF	GA	GD
34	16	10	8	57	36	+21	58	14	3	0	39	11	+28	2	7	8	18	25	−7

==== Results by round ====
Round	1	2	3	4	5	6	7	8	9	10	11	12	13	14	15	16	17	18	19	20	21	22	23	24	25	26	27	28	29	30	31	32	33	34
Ground	H	A	H	A	H	A	H	A	H	A	H	H	A	H	A	H	A	A	H	A	H	A	H	A	H	A	H	A	A	H	A	H	A	H
Result	W	L	D	D	W	L	W	D	W	L	W	W	D	D	L	W	L	D	W	L	W	L	W	D	W	L	W	W	D	W	W	W	D	D
Position	6	12	11	10	7	6	6	6	4	5	5	3	3	3	4	4	5	4	4	5	5	5	3	3	3	4	3	3	3	2	2	2	2	2

Source: Competitive matches
A = Away; H = Home; W = Win; D = Draw; L = Loss

== Matches ==
=== Yugoslav First League ===
Round	Date	Venue	Opponent	Score	Attendance	Hajduk Scorers
1	17 Aug	H	Sloboda	1 – 0	18,000	Šalov
2	24 Aug	A	Borac Banja Luka	0 – 1	13,000	
3	31 Aug	H	Vardar	1 – 1	10,000	Primorac
4	7 Sep	A	Željezničar	1 – 1	10,000	Vulić
5	14 Sep	H	Velež	1 – 0	13,000	Gudelj
6	21 Sep	A	Dinamo Zagreb	1 – 2	50,000	Zl. Vujović
7	5 Oct	A	Vojvodina	3 – 1	8,000	Vulić (2), Vujadinović (o.g.)
8	8 Oct	A	Olimpija	0 – 0	10,000	
9	12 Oct	H	Budućnost	4 – 1	7,000	Zl. Vujović (2), Primorac, Vulić
10	19 Oct	A	Napredak Kruševac	2 – 4	9,000	Kostić (o.g.), Primorac
11	26 Oct	H	Red Star	1 – 0	30,000	Krstičević
12	29 Oct	H	Sarajevo	3 – 0	11,000	Vulić, Bogdanović, Gudelj
13	1 Nov	A	OFK Beograd	1 – 1	2,000	Zl. Vujović
14	9 Nov	H	Partizan	1 – 1	15,000	Gudelj
15	23 Nov	A	NK Zagreb	0 – 2	20,000	
16	30 Nov	H	Rijeka	2 – 0	4,000	Zl. Vujović (2)
17	7 Dec	A	Radnički Niš	1 – 3	7,000	Vulić
18	1 Mar	A	Sloboda	1 – 1	7,000	Vulić
19	8 Mar	H	Borac Banja Luka	2 – 0	10,000	Vulić, Gudelj
20	15 Mar	A	Vardar	1 – 2	25,000	Zo. Vujović
21	22 Mar	H	Željezničar	3 – 0	9,000	Zo. Vujović (3)
22	29 Mar	A	Velež	0 – 1	16,000	
23	5 Apr	H	Dinamo Zagreb	3 – 1	35,000	Šalov, Vulić, Zo. Vujović
24	12 Apr	A	Vojvodina	0 – 0	12,000	
25	15 Apr	H	Olimpija	3 – 2	10,000	Zl. Vujović (2), Terčič (o.g.)
26	19 Apr	A	Budućnost	0 – 2	15,000	
27	5 May	H	Napredak Kruševac	3 – 2	7,000	Zo. Vujović, Gudelj (2)
28	10 May	A	Red Star	3 – 1	45,000	Gudelj (2), Zo. Vujović
29	17 May	A	Sarajevo	1 – 1	15,000	Šurjak
30	27 May	H	OFK Beograd	4 – 0	8,000	Šurjak, Zo. Vujović, Zl. Vujović (2)
31	31 May	A	Partizan	4 – 0	25,000	Šurjak (2), Zo. Vujović, Gudelj
32	7 Jun	H	NK Zagreb	1 – 0	10,000	Zo. Vujović
33	10 Jun	A	Rijeka	2 – 2	13,000	Zl. Vujović, Gudelj
34	14 Jun	H	Radnički Niš	3 – 3	13,000	Šurjak (2), Zo. Vujović

Sources: hajduk.hr

=== Yugoslav Cup ===
Round	Date	Venue	Opponent	Score	Attendance	Hajduk Scorers
R1	15 Oct	A	Budućnost	0 – 4	8,000	

Sources: hajduk.hr

== Player seasonal records ==
=== Top scorers ===
Rank	Name	Goals
1	(Socialist Federal Republic of Yugoslavia) Zlatko Vujović	12
2	(Socialist Federal Republic of Yugoslavia) Ivan Gudelj	10
3	(Socialist Federal Republic of Yugoslavia) Zoran Vujović	9
3	(Socialist Federal Republic of Yugoslavia) Zoran Vulić	9
5	(Socialist Federal Republic of Yugoslavia) Ivica Šurjak	6
6	(Socialist Federal Republic of Yugoslavia) Boro Primorac	3
7	(Socialist Federal Republic of Yugoslavia) Nenad Šalov	2
8	(Socialist Federal Republic of Yugoslavia) Mladen Bogdanović	1
8	(Socialist Federal Republic of Yugoslavia) Mišo Krstičević	1
8	(Socialist Federal Republic of Yugoslavia) Esad Mehmedalić	1
	Own goals	3
	TOTALS	57

Source: Competitive matches

== See also ==
- 1980–81 Yugoslav First League
- 1980–81 Yugoslav Cup

== External sources ==
- 1980–81 Yugoslav First League at rsssf.com
- 1980–81 Yugoslav Cup at rsssf.com
- 1980–81 Yugoslav First League at historical-lineups.com
