= Radomir Vukčević =

Yugoslav footballer

Personal information
- Date of birth: 15 September 1941
- Place of birth: Knin, Independent State of Croatia
- Date of death: 28 November 2014 (aged 73)
- Place of death: Split, Croatia
- Height: 1.86 m (6 ft 1 in)
- Position: Goalkeeper

Youth career
- Dinara

Senior career*
Years	Team	Apps	(Gls)
1957–1963	Dinara		
1963–1973	Hajduk Split	182	(0)
1973–1975	Ajaccio	31	(0)
Total		213	(0)

International career
1967–1971	Yugoslavia	9	(0)
Medal record
Men's Football
Representing Yugoslavia
European Championship
Silver medal – second place	1968 Italy	Team
- * Club domestic league appearances and goals

Radomir Vukčević (15 September 1941 – 28 November 2014) was a Yugoslav footballer.

== International career ==
He made his debut for Yugoslavia in a November 1967 friendly match away against the Netherlands and earned a total of 9 caps, scoring no goals. His final international was a September 1971 friendly against Mexico.
