= Joško Gluić =

Yugoslav footballer

Personal information
- Date of birth: 23 September 1951 (age 75)
- Place of birth: PR Croatia, FPR Yugoslavia
- Position: Midfielder

Senior career*
| Years | Team | Apps | (Gls) |
| 1969–1974 | Hajduk Split | | |
| 1973 | → Toronto Croatia (loan) | | |
| 1974–1976 | Go Ahead Eagles | 42 | (14) |
| 1976–1977 | Ajax | 9 | (0) |
| 1978 | Grazer AK | | |
| 1978–1979 | Olimpija Ljubljana | 3 | (0) |
- * Club domestic league appearances and goals

Joško Gluić (born 23 September 1951) is a Yugoslavian former footballer who played as a midfielder for HNK Hajduk Split, Go Ahead Eagles, AFC Ajax, Grazer AK and Olimpija Ljubljana during his career.

== Club career ==
Gluić began his career in 1969 with HNK Hajduk Split with whom he won the Yugoslav First League championship in 1971, as well as the Yugoslav Cup in 1972 and 1973. In 1973, he had a loan spell in the National Soccer League with Toronto Croatia. Afterwards he moved to the Netherlands, where he played 42 matches for Go Ahead Eagles scoring 14 goals. In 1976, he transferred to AFC Ajax, where he played in 9 matches without scoring. In the 1977/78 season, he played for Grazer AK in Austria, and then played for Olimpija Ljubljana in the 1978-1979 season, making three appearances that season, before retiring.
