= Mićun Jovanić =

Croatian footballer

Personal information
- Full name: Mićun Jovanić
- Date of birth: 29 July 1952
- Place of birth: Split, PR Croatia, FPR Yugoslavia
- Date of death: 26 July 2010 (aged 57)
- Place of death: Kaštel Gomilica, Croatia
- Height: 1.86 m (6 ft 1 in)
- Position: Forward

Youth career
- 1965–1969: NK Kaštel Gomilica

Senior career*
Years	Team	Apps	(Gls)
1969–1981	Hajduk Split	210	(27)
1981–1982	Anderlecht	9	(0)
1982–1983	Solin	15	(0)
1983–1985	Béziers	54	(3)

International career
	Yugoslavia (youth levels)	4	

Managerial career
- 1991: RNK Split
- 2000–2001: Segesta
- 2006: Segesta
- 2008: GOŠK AC
- * Club domestic league appearances and goals

Mićun Jovanić (29 July 1952 – 26 July 2010) was a Croatian footballer best known for his 12-year spell with Hajduk Split, where he played between 1969 and 1981. Later in his career Jovanić also played for Belgian side Anderlecht and lower level sides AS Béziers in France and Solin in Croatia.

== Playing career ==
=== Club ===
He was one of the most consistent members of Hajduk's golden generation which dominated Yugoslav football in the 1970s and won four Yugoslav First League championships and five Yugoslav Cup titles. Because of this, Jovanić is one of the three most decorated Hajduk players in the history of the club (along with Dražen Mužinić and Luka Peruzović). Throughout his career Jovanić had appeared in 210 league matches and scored 27 league goals for Hajduk.

=== International ===
Unlike many of his teammates from that era who went on to become regular Yugoslav internationals (such as Jurica Jerković, Ivica Šurjak, Slaviša Žungul and Dražen Mužinić), Jovanić was never capped for the national team, although he did appear 4 times for Yugoslavia at youth levels.

== Managerial career ==
After retiring from playing in 1985 Jovanić had several managing spells at lower level Croatian sides, including a 1991 spell with RNK Split and two spells at Segesta.

== Personal life ==
=== Death ===
In early July 2010 the Croatian media reported that Jovanić had been diagnosed with pancreatic cancer and that a fundraising campaign was launched to raise some 20,000 euros for his treatment abroad. In spite of the successful fundraiser, Jovanić died on the night between 25 and 26 July 2010 at his home in Kaštel Gomilica near Split.

== Honours ==
- Yugoslav First League (4): 1970–71, 1973–74, 1974–75, 1978–79
- Yugoslav Cup (5): 1972, 1973, 1974, 1976, 1977
