= Ivan Hlevnjak =

Croatian footballer

Personal information
- Date of birth: 28 April 1944
- Place of birth: El Shatt, Kingdom of Egypt
- Date of death: 28 November 2015 (aged 71)
- Place of death: Split, Croatia
- Position: Attacking midfielder

Senior career*
Years	Team	Apps	(Gls)
1962–1973	Hajduk Split	310	(72)
1973–1975	RC Strasbourg	52	(9)
1975–1979	SAS Épinal	115	(26)
1980–1981	Philadelphia Fever (indoor)		

International career
	Yugoslavia U-21	3	(0)
1969–1970	Yugoslavia	3	(0)
- * Club domestic league appearances and goals

Ivan Hlevnjak (28 April 1944 – 28 November 2015) was a Croatian midfielder who played for Yugoslavia.

== Club career ==
Born during Second World War in El Shatt refugee camp in the Sinai Peninsula in Egypt, after war he returned to his fatherlands home country, Yugoslavia, and began playing football in the youth teams of Hajduk Split. He debuted for Hajduk senior team in the season 1962–63 and played in the club until 1973 making a total of 665 appearances and scoring 237 goals with Hajduk. After leaving Hajduk he moved to France and played with Ligue 1 side RC Strasbourg (1973–1975) and Ligue 2 side SAS Épinal (1975–1979). Later he played indoor soccer in the United States with Philadelphia Fever in the season 1980–81.

== International career ==
Besides 3 appearances for the Yugoslav U-21 team, he made 3 appearances for the Yugoslav main team, his final being a November 1970 friendly match against West Germany.
