= Stadion Stari plac =

Sports venue in Split, Croatia

Coordinates: 43°30′44″N 16°26′06″E

Stari plac
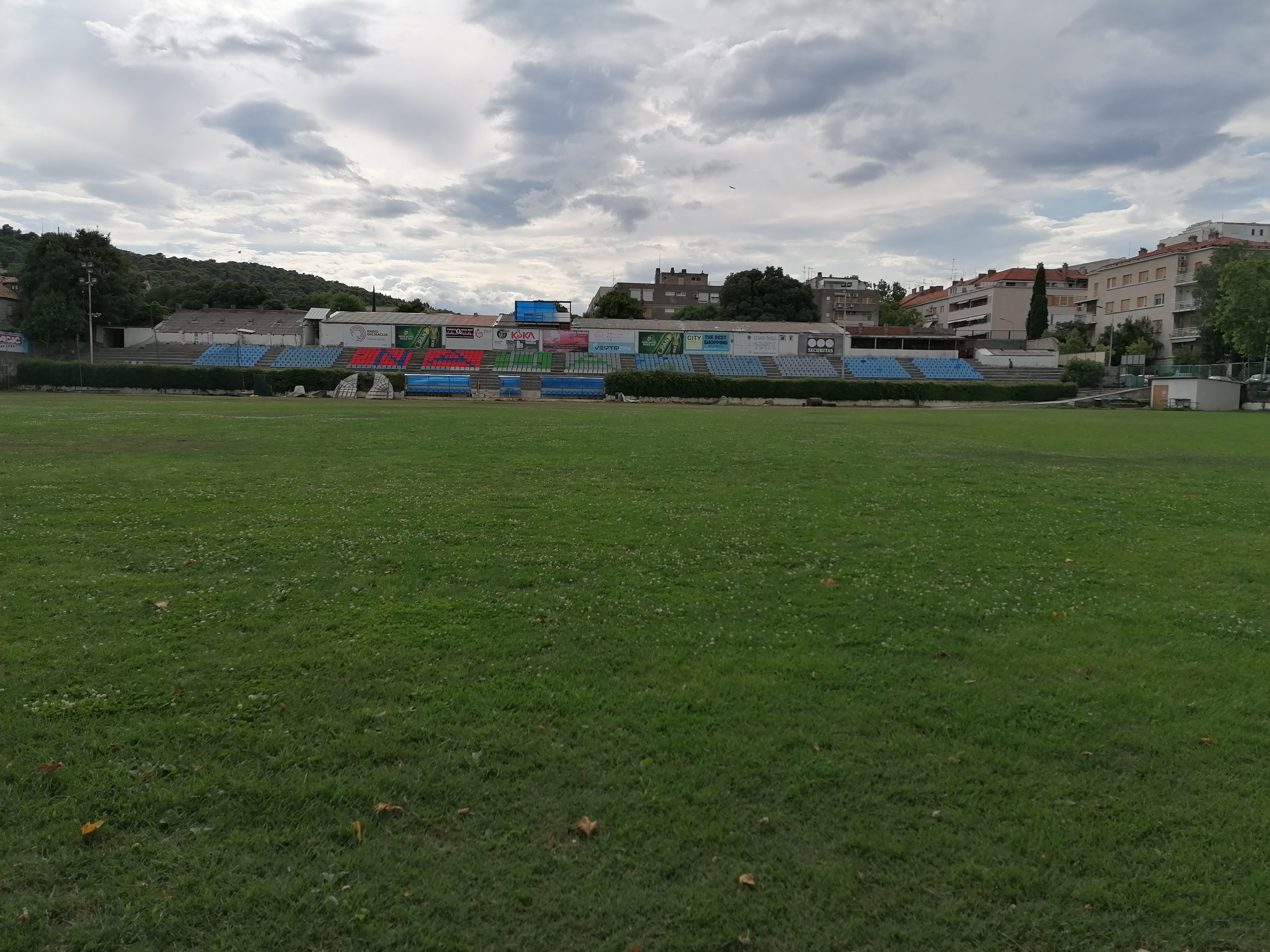
- Interactive map of Stari plac
- Full name: Stadion Stari plac
- Location: Split, Croatia
- Capacity: 20,000 (historical), 3,000 (924 seated)
- Field size: 105 m x 70 m

Construction
- Opened: 1911
- Renovated: 1951, 1979

Tenants
- Hajduk Split (1911–1979); RK Nada Split

Stari plac (lit. "Old ground"), also often referred to as Plinara Stadion, (or incorrectly in some foreign sources as Plinada Stadion) is a stadium in Split, Croatia used originally for association football and later mainly for rugby union. It hosted a match between Yugoslavia and Netherlands in the UEFA Euro 1972 qualifying tournament, and in April 2010 a match between the Croatia national rugby union team and Netherlands in the 2008-10 European Nations Cup tournament. Stari plac is the home ground of Rugby Club Nada Split.

The area the stadium was built on was originally a gasworks and was also used as a military training ground by the army. It was initially used as the home stadium of HNK Hajduk Split. Although it was their basic venue in the early years, it was not until 1926 that the first stand was built.

Initially, the 100 x 60 meters pitch was oriented west-to-east. After World War I it was resized to 105 x 70 meters on a north-to-south orientation. Its first wooden stands, built in 1926, burned down that same year. Three years later, new stands were built with a capacity of 900 people, but these were gradually demolished during World War II. After the war, the stadium received a major reconstruction with a new drainage system, and a wooden west stand for 1,400 people. Ten years later, the sandy pitch was replaced with grass, and later new stands were built on the eastern side of the pitch.

In November 2009, Hajduk fans watched a home game versus Dinamo Zagreb on a big screen in the Stari plac, rather than see the game in the Poljud, in a protest against the actual club board.
