= Ivan Buljan =

Croatian footballer (born 1949)

Personal information
- Date of birth: 11 December 1949 (age 76)
- Place of birth: Runovići, PR Croatia, FPR Yugoslavia
- Height: 1.84 m (6 ft 0 in)
- Position: Defender

Youth career
- –1967: NK Mračaj

Senior career*
Years	Team	Apps	(Gls)
1967–1977	Hajduk Split	192	(14)
1977–1981	Hamburger SV	103	(22)
1981–1982	New York Cosmos	33	(3)
Total		328	(39)

International career
1973	Yugoslavia U21	1	(0)
1973–1981	Yugoslavia	36	(2)

Managerial career
- 1995: Hajduk Split
- 1996–1997: Hajduk Split
- 1997–1998: Étoile Sahel
- 1998: Šibenik
- 1999: Al-Wakrah
- 2000–2001: Al Salmiya
- * Club domestic league appearances and goals

Ivan "Iko" Buljan (born 11 December 1949) is a Croatian football manager and former player who played as a defender. He was a member of the Yugoslavia national team at the 1974 FIFA World Cup and UEFA Euro 1976.

== Playing career ==
Buljan was born in Runovići village near Imotski. Ethnically Croatian, he was capped for the Yugoslavia national team 36 times. He reached the European Cup final 1979–80 with Hamburger SV where the club ultimately lost to Nottingham Forest. He is also known by his nickname Iko.

Buljan started his career with local club NK Mračaj before moving to the first-league team Hajduk Split in 1967. In 1975, he was selected as Večernji list's top player in Yugoslavia. Buljan finally left Hajduk in 1977 for Hamburger SV where he played until 1981. He then finished his career with two seasons with the New York Cosmos.

== Managerial career ==
From 2008 to 2009, he was the sporting director at HNK Hajduk Split.

== Honours ==
Individual

- Yugoslav Footballer of the Year: 1975
