= Dražen Mužinić =

Croatian footballer (born 1953)

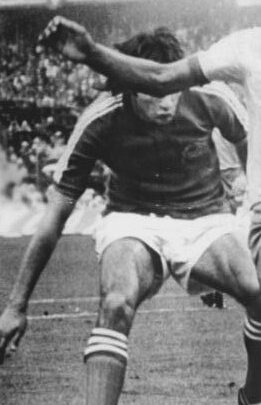
- Mužinić in 1974

Personal information
- Date of birth: 25 January 1953 (age 73)
- Place of birth: Split, PR Croatia, FPR Yugoslavia
- Position: Midfielder

Senior career*
Years	Team	Apps	(Gls)
1969–1980	Hajduk Split	280	(13)
1980–1982	Norwich City	30	(0)
Total		310	(13)

International career
1974–1979	Yugoslavia	32	(1)
- * Club domestic league appearances and goals

Dražen Mužinić (born 25 January 1953) is a Croatian former professional footballer who played as a midfielder.

Mužinić spent most of his career in his native Yugoslavia. With Hajduk Split he won four league titles, five cups and he was capped by his country 32 times. He was named the Yugoslav Footballer of the Year in 1977.

== Club career ==
Norwich City manager John Bond signed him in 1980, paying what was then a club record £300,000 for his services. However, his time at Norwich was not a success. He struggled for form and did not speak English, making communication at times impossible. At one match, Bond employed the services of an interpreter from the University of East Anglia to pass on instructions to Mužinić from the touchline.

Mužinić made just 23 appearances for Norwich, 17 starts and 6 substitute appearances. He did not score a goal for the club. He made his debut on 13 September 1980 and his final appearance for the club came on 28 December 1982. By then, Bond had left the club to manage Manchester City and his successor Ken Brown cancelled the player's contract at the end of the 1981–82 season. Bond admitted that he had not seen Mužinić play and had signed him on reputation, leading then-Norwich player Justin Fashanu to say "I don't think we got Mužinić, I reckon they sent his milkman."

== International career ==
Mužinić made his debut for Yugoslavia in an April 1974 friendly match against the Soviet Union and earned a total of 32 caps, scoring 1 goal. He represented them at the 1974 World Cup and Euro 1976. His final international was an October 1979 European Championship qualification match away against Spain.

== After football ==
In his 2002 updated edition of Canary Citizens, Mike Davage reported that Mužinić has been running a restaurant in Brač. He has also worked as a scout for his former club Hajduk Split.

== Sources ==
- Mark Davage; John Eastwood; Kevin Platt (2001). Canary Citizens. Jarrold Publishing. ISBN 0-7117-2020-7.
