= Ivica Šurjak =

Croatian footballer

Personal information
- Full name: Ivan Šurjak
- Date of birth: 23 March 1953 (age 73)
- Place of birth: Split, PR Croatia, FPR Yugoslavia
- Height: 1.90 m (6 ft 3 in)
- Position: Midfielder

Senior career*
Years	Team	Apps	(Gls)
1971–1981	Hajduk Split	272	(52)
1981–1982	Paris Saint-Germain	33	(11)
1982–1984	Udinese	29	(2)
1984–1985	Real Zaragoza	22	(4)
Total		356	(69)

International career
1973–1982	Yugoslavia	54	(10)
- * Club domestic league appearances and goals

Ivan "Ivica" Šurjak (born 23 March 1953) is a Croatian retired football midfielder. He was the driving force behind the success of Hajduk Split as it became a force in the Yugoslav First League in the 1970s.

== Club career ==
He started his career as a left back, but with time learned total football, according to which all players can, during the ebb and flow of the match, slot into every position as needed. He continued his career at Paris Saint-Germain and Udinese, but turned down offers by the New York Cosmos and Real Madrid. He concluded his playing career in Spain at Real Zaragoza.

== International career ==
Šurjak made his debut for Yugoslavia in an October 1973 World Cup qualifier against Spain, coming on as a 61st-minute substitute for Petar Krivokuća.

Over the subsequent 9 years, Šurjak ended up earning a total of 54 caps, scoring 10 goals. His final international was a June 1982 FIFA World Cup match against Honduras.

== Post-playing career ==
He served as a sports director at Hajduk Split of the Croatian First Football League from 1999 to 2003.

== Personal ==
In 1980, Šurjak recorded songs "Ni ljubav nije kao što je bila" and "Julija" and released them as a 7-inch single through Jugoton. In 2018, "Julija" was included in Croatia Records' compilation album Socialist Disco. Dancing Behind Yugoslavia's Velvet Curtain 1977–1987.

=== Speedboat incident ===
In July 1999, while piloting his seven-meter 1989 Formula F-242 runabout speedboat on the Croatian Adriatic coast, Šurjak was involved in a boating accident that resulted in a swimmer's death. The victim, 29-year-old Okrug resident Miroslav Didak, sustained life-threatening head injuries in the Bušinci inlet, 400 meters off the Čiovo island shoreline near Trogir on 21 July 1999 around 5pm when Šurjak struck him with his boat's propeller, reportedly after suddenly noticing the swimmer in the water and attempting to swerve out of the way. Šurjak and the other four individuals on the boat, including Šurjak's wife Renata and Šurjak's friend Ljubomir Šimundić, then reportedly took comatose and severely injured Didak out of the water and brought him to the shoreline where an ambulance rushed him to Split. According to a Slobodna Dalmacija report, Šurjak did not have the mandatory insurance policy for the vessel he owned and operated. Večernji list further reported that Šurjak did not have a boating license and that his blood alcohol level at the time of the incident was 0.4‰.

Didak died a few days after the accident, while in a coma in the intensive care unit of the Firule hospital.

Šurjak was charged with involuntary manslaughter. In a legal process that began years later before the Municipal Court in Trogir, a verdict was delivered in March 2008, acquitting Šurjak of any responsibility in the death of Miroslav Didak. The Municipal Court judge's verdict cited that by swimming 400 meters from the shore Didak violated a by-law prohibiting swimming farther than 100 meters from the shore, and additionally stated that "Šurjak couldn't swerve out of the way due to having sun in his eyes and facing waves mater-and-a-half high".

On subsequent appeal by the Croatian State Prosecutor's Office, the case went before the Provincial Court in Split. In July 2009, one month before the statute of limitations for the case was set to expire, the Provincial Court handed down its decision: confirming the lower court's verdict to acquit Šurjak.

== Accomplishments ==
- Champion of Yugoslavia – 1974, 1975 and 1979
- Co-champion of Yugoslavia – 1976 and 1981
- Cup winner of Yugoslavia – 1972, 1973, 1974, 1976 and 1977
- Coupe de France – 1982
- 54 caps for Yugoslavia, 10 goals scored between 1973 and 1982
- Yugoslav Footballer of the Year – 1976
