= 2002–03 HNK Hajduk Split season =

Hajduk Split
2002–03 season
- Chairman: Branko Grgić
- Manager: Zoran Vulić
- Prva HNL: 2nd
- Croatian Cup: Winners
- UEFA Cup: First round
- Top goalscorer: League: Petar Krpan (10); All: Petar Krpan (13)
- Highest home attendance: 30,000 vs Dinamo Zagreb (1 September 2002)
- Lowest home attendance: 300 vs TŠK Topolovac (6 November 2002)
- Average home league attendance: 7,969

The 2002–03 season was the 92nd season in Hajduk Split’s history and their 12th in the Prva HNL. Their second place finish in the 2001–02 season meant it was their 12th successive season playing in the Prva HNL.

== First-team squad ==
Squad at end of season

Note: Flags indicate national team as defined under FIFA eligibility rules; some limited exceptions apply. Players may hold more than one non-FIFA nationality.

No.	Pos.	Nation	Player
1	GK	CRO	Stipe Pletikosa
3	DF	CRO	Ivica Pirić (on loan from Arsenal Kyiv)
4	DF	BIH	Ivan Radeljić
5	FW	BIH	Almir Turković
6	DF	CRO	Vlatko Đolonga
7	DF	CRO	Hrvoje Vejić
8	FW	CRO	Nino Bule
9	FW	SVN	Klemen Lavrič
10	MF	CRO	Mario Carević
11	FW	CRO	Zvonimir Deranja
12	GK	CRO	Vladimir Balić
13	FW	CRO	Petar Krpan
14	MF	CRO	Srđan Andrić
15	DF	CRO	Dario Brgles
17	DF	CRO	Hrvoje Vuković

No.	Pos.	Nation	Player
18	DF	CRO	Darijo Srna
19	MF	CRO	Dean Računica
21	DF	CRO	Darko Miladin
22	MF	CRO	Ante Miše
23	DF	CRO	Mato Neretljak
25	GK	CRO	Zlatko Runje
26	MF	CRO	Milan Rapaić
27	DF	CRO	Luka Vučko
28	DF	CRO	Igor Lozo
30	FW	CRO	Hrvatin Gudelj
—	FW	CRO	Nikica Jelavić
—	MF	CRO	Vik Lalić
—	MF	CRO	Mario Grgurović
—	GK	CRO	Hrvoje Sunara

=== Left club during season ===
Note: Flags indicate national team as defined under FIFA eligibility rules; some limited exceptions apply. Players may hold more than one non-FIFA nationality.

No.	Pos.	Nation	Player
5	DF	CRO	Goran Sablić (to Dynamo Kyiv)
20	FW	CRO	Tomislav Erceg (to Sanfrecce Hiroshima)

No.	Pos.	Nation	Player
—	DF	CRO	Jurica Puljiz (loaned to Šibenik)

== Competitions ==
=== Overall record ===
Performance by competition
Competition	Starting round	Final position/round	First match	Last match
Prva HNL	—N/a	Runners-up	28 July 2002	31 May 2003
Croatian Football Cup	First round	Winners	11 September 2002	4 June 2003
UEFA Cup	Qualifying round	First round	15 August 2002	3 October 2002

Statistics by competition
Competition	Pld	W	D	L	GF	GA	GD	Win%
Prva HNL	32	22	4	6	56	22	+34	68.75
Croatian Football Cup	8	7	1	0	22	3	+19	87.50
UEFA Cup	4	2	1	1	13	2	+11	50.00
Total	44	31	6	7	91	27	+64	70.45

=== Prva HNL ===
==== First stage ====
Pos	Team	Pld	W	D	L	GF	GA	GD	Pts	Qualification
1	Dinamo Zagreb	22	18	3	1	51	17	+34	57	Qualification to championship group
2	Hajduk Split	22	16	2	4	42	14	+28	50	Qualification to championship group
3	Varteks	22	15	0	7	40	21	+19	45	Qualification to championship group
4	Cibalia	22	9	5	8	28	28	0	32	Qualification to championship group
5	Kamen Ingrad	22	7	9	6	23	22	+1	30	Qualification to championship group

Source: RSSSF.org
Rules for classification: 1) points; 2) goal difference; 3) number of goals scored.

==== Second stage (championship play-off) ====
Pos	Team	Pld	W	D	L	GF	GA	GD	Pts	Qualification
1	Dinamo Zagreb (C)	32	25	3	4	76	27	+49	78	Qualification to Champions League second qualifying round
2	Hajduk Split	32	22	4	6	56	22	+34	70	Qualification to UEFA Cup qualifying round
3	Varteks	32	18	3	11	52	38	+14	57	Qualification to UEFA Cup qualifying round
4	Kamen Ingrad	32	11	11	10	34	34	0	44	Qualification to UEFA Cup qualifying round
5	Cibalia	32	12	7	13	39	44	−5	43	Qualification to Intertoto Cup second round
6	NK Zagreb	32	9	9	14	40	52	−12	36	Qualification to Intertoto Cup first round

Source: RSSSF.org
Rules for classification: 1) points; 2) goal difference; 3) number of goals scored.
(C) Champions

==== Results summary ====
Overall								Home						Away					
Pld	W	D	L	GF	GA	GD	Pts	W	D	L	GF	GA	GD	W	D	L	GF	GA	GD
32	22	4	6	56	22	+34	70	15	1	0	38	5	+33	7	3	6	18	17	+1

Last updated: 31 May 2003.
Source: Sportnet.hr

==== Results by round ====
Round	1	2	3	4	5	6	7	8	9	10	11	12	13	14	15	16	17	18	19	20	21	22	23	24	25	26	27	28	29	30	31	32
Ground	A	H	A	H	A	H	A	H	A	A	H	H	A	H	A	H	A	H	A	H	H	A	H	A	H	H	A	A	H	A	A	H
Result	W	W	W	D	L	W	L	W	W	W	W	W	W	W	D	W	L	W	W	W	W	L	W	W	W	W	D	L	W	L	D	W
Position	3	1	1	2	3	3	4	2	2	2	1	1	1	1	2	2	2	2	2	2	2	2	2	2	2	2	2	2	2	2	2	2

Source: Competitive matches
A = Away; H = Home; W = Win; D = Draw; L = Loss

==== Results by opponent ====
Team	1–22		23–32		Points
Team	1	2	1	2	Points
Cibalia	1–4	4–0	1–1	1–0	7
Dinamo Zagreb	1–0	1–2	1–0	4–1	9
Kamen Ingrad	1–1	1–1	2–0	0–1	5
Osijek	2–0	2–0	—	—	6
Pomorac	5–1	3–0	—	—	6
Rijeka	2–1	1–0	—	—	6
Slaven Belupo	0–1	3–1	—	—	3
Šibenik	1–0	3–1	—	—	6
Varteks	1–0	3–1	1–0	2–2	10
Zadar	1–0	4–0	—	—	6
NK Zagreb	3–0	1–2	1–0	1–3	6

Source: 2002–03 Croatian First Football League article

== Matches ==
=== Friendlies ===
==== Pre-season ====
17 July 2002 Friendly	Hajduk Split	1–2	AEK Athens	Dietersdorf am Gnasbach
18:30 CEST (UTC+02:00)	Erceg 13'	Report	Nikolaidis 32'; Lakis 78'	Stadium: Wald Stadium

=== Prva HNL ===
==== First stage ====
28 July 2002 1	Varteks	0–1	Hajduk Split	Varaždin
20:15 CEST (UTC+02:00)		Report	Neretljak 66'	Stadium: Stadion Varteks; Attendance: 6,000; Referee: Željko Širić (Osijek)

3 August 2002 2	Hajduk Split	2–1	Rijeka	Split
20:00 CEST (UTC+02:00)	Carević 58'; Računica 90+1'	Report	G. Brajković 42'; M. Brajković (yellow card) 54' (yellow-red card) 84'; Celiščak (yellow card) 88' (yellow-red card) 90+3'	Stadium: Stadion Poljud; Attendance: 8,000; Referee: Darko Feljan (Zagreb)

10 August 2002 3	Šibenik	0–1	Hajduk Split	Šibenik
20:00 CEST (UTC+02:00)		Report	Vejić 58'	Stadium: Stadion Šubićevac; Attendance: 10,000; Referee: Ivan Novak (Varaždin)

18 August 2002 4	Hajduk Split	0–0	Kamen Ingrad	Split
20:00 CEST (UTC+02:00)	Srna (yellow card) 18' (yellow-red card) 57'; Računica (yellow card) 60' (yellow-red card) 89'	Report		Stadium: Stadion Poljud; Attendance: 5,000; Referee: Hrvoje Kurtović (Osijek)

24 August 2002 5	Cibalia	4–1	Hajduk Split	Vinkovci
17:00 CEST (UTC+02:00)	Pernar 14'; Jurić 45'; Maroslavac 71'; Žgela 73'	Report	Bule 8'; Pirić (yellow card) 13' (yellow-red card) 19'; Miše (red card) 32'	Stadium: Stadion HNK Cibalia; Attendance: 7,000; Referee: Ivan Novak (Varaždin)

1 September 2002 6	Hajduk Split	1–0	Dinamo Zagreb	Split
18:00 CEST (UTC+02:00)	Đolonga 27'	Report	Mikić (red card) 89'	Stadium: Stadion Poljud; Attendance: 30,000; Referee: Željko Širić (Osijek)

14 September 2002 7	Slaven Belupo	1–0	Hajduk Split	Koprivnica
16:30 CEST (UTC+02:00)	Ferenčina 14'; Bošnjak (red card) 27'	Report	Vuković (red card) 27'	Stadium: Gradski stadion Attendance: 4,000; Referee: Goran Marić (Zagreb)

22 September 2002 8	Hajduk Split	5–1	Pomorac	Split
16:30 CEST (UTC+02:00)	Đolonga 9'; Grubišić 49' (o.g.); Računica 65'; Deranja 69', 89'	Report	Prpić 80'	Stadium: Stadion Poljud; Attendance: 1,500; Referee: Vlado Svilokos (Sisak)

28 September 2002 9	Zadar	0–1	Hajduk Split	Zadar
16:00 CEST (UTC+02:00)		Report	Bule 44'; Carević (yellow card) 60' (yellow-red card) 76'	Stadium: Stadion Stanovi; Attendance: 5,500; Referee: Draženko Kovačić (Križevci)

6 October 2002 10	Osijek	0–2	Hajduk Split	Osijek
17:30 CEST (UTC+02:00)		Report	Miladin 71'; Srna 84'	Stadium: Stadion Gradski vrt Attendance: 3,000; Referee: Goran Marić (Zagreb)

20 October 2002 11	Hajduk Split	3–0	NK Zagreb	Split
17:30 CEST (UTC+02:00)	Bule 14'; Krpan 31'; Pletikosa 70' (pen.)	Report		Stadium: Stadion Poljud; Attendance: 5,000; Referee: Ivan Bebek (Rijeka)

27 October 2002 12	Hajduk Split	3–1	Varteks	Split
17:30 CET (UTC+01:00)	Pletikosa 17' (pen.); Đolonga 45'; Srna (red card) 73'; Deranja 83'	Report	Hrman 44'; Karić (red card) 88'	Stadium: Stadion Poljud; Attendance: 12,000; Referee: Goran Marić (Zagreb)

2 November 2002 13	Rijeka	0–1	Hajduk Split	Rijeka
16:00 CET (UTC+01:00)		Report	Deranja 48'	Stadium: Stadion Kantrida; Attendance: 5,000; Referee: Vlado Svilokos (Sisak)

9 November 2002 14	Hajduk Split	3–1	Šibenik	Split
16:00 CET (UTC+01:00)	Đolonga 42'; Pletikosa 44' (pen.); Krpan 77'	Report	Jović 83'	Stadium: Stadion Poljud; Attendance: 4,000; Referee: Hrvoje Kurtović (Osijek)

17 November 2002 15	Kamen Ingrad	1–1	Hajduk Split	Velika
16:00 CET (UTC+01:00)	Zekić 72'	Report	Neretljak 80'	Stadium: Stadion Kamen Ingrad; Attendance: 10,000; Referee: Vlado Svilokos (Sisak)

23 November 2002 16	Hajduk Split	4–0	Cibalia	Split
16:00 CET (UTC+01:00)	Deranja 9', 85'; Carević 20'; Bule 57'	Report		Stadium: Stadion Poljud; Attendance: 5,000; Referee: Draženko Kovačić (Križevci)

1 December 2002 17	Dinamo Zagreb	2–1	Hajduk Split	Zagreb
15:30 CET (UTC+01:00)	Smoje 51' (pen.); Olić 53'	Report	Krpan 90'	Stadium: Stadion Maksimir; Attendance: 25,000; Referee: Željko Širić (Osijek)

23 February 2003 18	Hajduk Split	2–0	Slaven Belupo	Split
15:45 CET (UTC+01:00)	Rapaić 43'; Turković 46'	Report	Crnac (red card) 42'	Stadium: Stadion Poljud; Attendance: 7,000; Referee: Ivan Bebek (Rijeka)

1 March 2003 19	Pomorac	0–3	Hajduk Split	Kostrena
15:00 CET (UTC+01:00)	E. Brajković (red card) 15'	Report	Turković 5', 49'; Bule 33'	Stadium: Stadion Žuknica; Attendance: 3,500; Referee: Draženko Kovačić (Križevci)

9 March 2003 20	Hajduk Split	4–0	Zadar	Split
17:00 CET (UTC+01:00)	Turković 21', 90'; Krpan 44', 54'	Report		Stadium: Stadion Poljud; Attendance: 6,000; Referee: Šime Vukić (Rijeka)

16 March 2003 21	Hajduk Split	2–0	Osijek	Split
18:00 CET (UTC+01:00)	Krpan 40'; Turković 49'	Report	Miljković (yellow card) 22' (yellow-red card) 47'	Stadium: Stadion Poljud; Attendance: 10,000; Referee: Vlado Svilokos (Sisak)

22 March 2003 22	NK Zagreb	2–1	Hajduk Split	Zagreb
15:30 CET (UTC+01:00)	Novaković 7'; Štrok 15'	Report	Krpan 72'	Stadium: Stadion Kranjčevićeva; Attendance: 4,000; Referee: Željko Širić (Osijek)

==== Championship play-off ====
5 April 2003 23	Hajduk Split	2–0	Kamen Ingrad	Split
19:00 CEST (UTC+02:00)	Srna 11' (pen.); Turković 87'	Report		Stadium: Stadion Poljud; Attendance: 3,000; Referee: Slavko Čulina (Zagreb)

13 April 2003 24	Dinamo Zagreb	0–1	Hajduk Split	Zagreb
17:30 CEST (UTC+02:00)		Report	Rapaić 41'	Stadium: Stadion Maksimir; Attendance: 25,000; Referee: Željko Širić (Osijek)

19 April 2003 25	Hajduk Split	1–0	NK Zagreb	Split
16:30 CEST (UTC+02:00)	Srna 61'; Turković (yellow card) 32' (yellow-red card) 79'	Report	Biskup (yellow card) 38' (yellow-red card) 45'; Žilić (yellow card) 45' (yellow-red card) 79'	Stadium: Stadion Poljud; Attendance: 12,000; Referee: Ivan Novak (Varaždin)

27 April 2003 26	Hajduk Split	1–0	Varteks	Split
17:30 CEST (UTC+02:00)	Bule 46'	Report		Stadium: Stadion Poljud; Attendance: 3,000; Referee: Vlado Svilokos (Sisak)

3 May 2003 27	Cibalia	1–1	Hajduk Split	Vinkovci
17:00 CEST (UTC+02:00)	Parmaković (yellow card) 34' (yellow-red card) 43'; Bartolović 90' (pen.)	Report	Rapaić 43' (pen.); Bule (yellow card) 79' (yellow-red card) 84'; Vuković (yellow card) 50' (yellow-red card) 90'	Stadium: Stadion HNK Cibalia; Attendance: 4,000; Referee: Draženko Kovačić (Križevci)

7 May 2003 28	Kamen Ingrad	1–0	Hajduk Split	Velika
18:30 CEST (UTC+02:00)	Jakirović 71' (pen.)	Report	Lalić (yellow card) 45' (yellow-red card) 70'	Stadium: Stadion Kamen Ingrad; Attendance: 4,000; Referee: Vlado Svilokos (Sisak)

11 May 2003 29	Hajduk Split	4–1	Dinamo Zagreb	Split
17:00 CEST (UTC+02:00)	Računica 41', 48'; Andrić 46'; Đolonga 55'	Report	Marić (yellow card) 9' (yellow-red card) 90' (goal) 32'	Stadium: Stadion Poljud; Attendance: 22,000; Referee: Željko Širić (Osijek)

17 May 2003 30	NK Zagreb	3–1	Hajduk Split	Zagreb
17:00 CEST (UTC+02:00)	Štrok 28'; Đalović 49', 56' (pen.); Ješe (yellow card) 70' (red card) 90'	Report	Andrić 45' (yellow card) 69' (red card) 90'; Lalić (yellow card) 43' (yellow-red card) 56'	Stadium: Stadion Kranjčevićeva; Attendance: 2,000; Referee: Draženko Kovačić (Križevci)

24 May 2003 31	Varteks	2–2	Hajduk Split	Varaždin
17:00 CEST (UTC+02:00)	Hrman 9'; Mumlek 36'	Report	Krpan 14', 80'	Stadium: Stadion Varteks; Attendance: 2,000; Referee: Marijo Strahonja (Zagreb)

31 May 2003 32	Hajduk Split	1–0	Cibalia	Split
17:00 CEST (UTC+02:00)	Lavrič 71'; Gudelj (yellow card) 87' (red card) 90'	Report	Parmaković (yellow card) 65' (yellow-red card) 88'	Stadium: Stadion Poljud; Attendance: 1,000; Referee: Goran Marić (Zagreb)

Source: hajduk.hr

=== Croatian Football Cup ===
11 September 2002 R1	Pag	2–7	Hajduk Split	Posedarje
16:00 CEST (UTC+02:00)	Strenja 51'; Buterin 68'	Report	Deranja 5', 37' (pen.), 79'; Brgles 41'; Đolonga 64'; Vučko 75'; Gudelj 90'	Stadium: Goran Demo; Attendance: 1,000; Referee: Šime Vukić (Rijeka)

6 November 2002 R2	Hajduk Split	1–0	TŠK Topolovac	Split
16:00 CET (UTC+01:00)	Krpan 69'	Report		Stadium: Stadion Poljud; Attendance: 300; Referee: Ante Vučemilović-Šimunović (Osijek)

5 March 2003 QF	Cibalia	1–3	Hajduk Split	Vinkovci
14:30	Bartolović 23' (pen.)	Report	Miladin 10'; Srna 18'; Neretljak 19'	Stadium: Stadion HNK Cibalia; Attendance: 5,000; Referee: Željko Širić (Osijek)

19 March 2003 QF	Hajduk Split	4–0 (7–1 agg.)	Cibalia	Split
16:00 CET (UTC+01:00)	Srna 2'; Vejić 42'; Lavrič 62'; Rapaić 74'	Report		Stadium: Stadion Poljud; Attendance: 800; Referee: Marijo Strahonja (Zagreb)

16 April 2003 SF	Hajduk Split	2–0	Varteks	Split
17:30 CEST (UTC+02:00)	Vejić 70'; Miladin 90+3'	Report		Stadium: Stadion Poljud; Attendance: 8,000; Referee: Draženko Kovačić (Križevci)

23 April 2003 SF	Varteks	0–0 (0–2 agg.)	Hajduk Split	Varaždin
17:30 CEST (UTC+02:00)		Report		Stadium: Stadion Varteks; Attendance: 4,000; Referee: Ivan Bebek (Rijeka)

21 May 2003 Final	Uljanik Pula	0–1	Hajduk Split	Pula
17:00 CEST (UTC+02:00)		Report	Bule 49'	Stadium: Stadion Aldo Drosina; Attendance: 5,000; Referee: Željko Širić (Osijek)

4 June 2003 Final	Hajduk Split	4–0 (5–0 agg.)	Uljanik Pula	Split
17:45 CEST (UTC+02:00)	Pletikosa 19' (pen.); Rapaić 27'; Turković 36'; Deranja 82'	Report		Stadium: Stadion Poljud; Attendance: 12,000; Referee: Goran Marić (Zagreb)

Source: hajduk.hr

=== UEFA Cup ===
==== Qualifying round ====
15 August 2002 First leg	Hajduk Split (Croatia)	3–0	(Faroe Islands) GÍ Gøta	Split, Croatia
20:30 CEST (UTC+02:00)	Đolonga 22'; Pletikosa 60' (pen.); Deranja 84'	Report		Stadium: Stadion Poljud; Attendance: 4,146; Referee: Vladimir Antonov (Moldova)

29 August 2002 Second leg	GÍ Gøta (Faroe Islands)	0–8 (0–11 agg.)	(Croatia) Hajduk Split	Tórshavn, Faroe Islands
18:00 WEST (UTC+01:00)		Report	Erceg 12', 16', 78'; Andrić 23', 35'; Pletikosa 45+1' (pen.); Carević 46', 85'	Stadium: Tórsvøllur; Attendance: 230; Referee: Igor Yarmenchuk (Ukraine)

==== First round ====
19 September 2002 First leg	Hajduk Split (Croatia)	0–1	(England) Fulham	Split, Croatia
20:00 CEST (UTC+02:00)		Report	Malbranque 50'	Stadium: Stadion Poljud; Attendance: 15,410; Referee: Fernando Carmona Mendez (Spain)

3 October 2002 Second leg	Fulham (England)	2–2 (3–2 agg.)	(Croatia) Hajduk Split	London, England
19:45 WEST (UTC+01:00)	Marlet 20'; Malbranque 43' (pen.)	Report	Davis 6' (o.g.); Vejić 39'	Stadium: Loftus Road; Attendance: 9,162; Referee: Stefano Farina (Italy)

Source: hajduk.hr

== Player seasonal records ==
=== Top scorers ===
Rank	Name	League	Europe	Cup	Total
1	(Croatia) Petar Krpan	10	–	1	11
2	(Croatia) Zvonimir Deranja	5	1	4	10
3	(Bosnia and Herzegovina) Almir Turković	7	–	1	8
4	(Croatia) Nino Bule	6	–	1	7
4	(Croatia) Vlatko Đolonga	5	1	1	7
6	(Croatia) Stipe Pletikosa	3	2	1	6
7	(Croatia) Milan Rapaić	3	–	2	5
7	(Croatia) Darijo Srna	3	–	2	5
9	(Croatia) Srđan Andrić	2	2	–	4
9	(Croatia) Mario Carević	2	2	–	4
9	(Croatia) Dean Računica	4	–	–	4
9	(Croatia) Hrvoje Vejić	1	1	2	4
13	(Croatia) Tomislav Erceg	–	3	–	3
13	(Croatia) Darko Miladin	1	–	2	3
13	(Croatia) Mato Neretljak	2	–	1	3
16	(Slovenia) Klemen Lavrič	1	–	1	2
17	(Croatia) Dario Brgles	–	–	1	1
17	(Croatia) Hrvatin Gudelj	–	–	1	1
17	(Croatia) Luka Vučko	–	–	1	1
	Own goals	1	1	–	2
	TOTALS	56	13	22	91

Source: Competitive matches

== See also ==
- 2002–03 Croatian First Football League
- 2002–03 Croatian Football Cup

== External sources ==
- 2002–03 Prva HNL at HRnogomet.com
- 2002–03 Croatian Cup at HRnogomet.com
- 2002–03 UEFA Cup at rsssf.com
