= 2001–02 HNK Hajduk Split season =

Hajduk Split
2001–02 season
- Chairman: Branko Grgić
- Manager: Nenad Gračan; Slaven Bilić
- Prva HNL: 2nd
- Croatian Cup: Quarter-finals
- Champions League: Third qualifying round
- UEFA Cup: First round
- Top goalscorer: League: Tomislav Erceg (13); All: Tomislav Erceg (15)
- Highest home attendance: 26,922 vs Mallorca (8 August 2001)
- Lowest home attendance: 800 vs Slaven Belupo (4 May 2002)
- Average home league attendance: 4,653

The 2001–02 season was the 91st season in Hajduk Split’s history and their 11th in the Prva HNL. Their first place finish in the 2000–01 season meant it was their 11th successive season playing in the Prva HNL.

== Competitions ==
=== Overall record ===
Performance by competition
Competition	Starting round	Final position/round	First match	Last match
Prva HNL	—N/a	Runners-up	4 August 2001	4 May 2002
Croatian Football Cup	First round	Quarter-final	16 October 2001	9 December 2001
UEFA Champions League	Second qualifying round	Third qualifying round	25 July 2001	21 August 2001
UEFA Cup	First round		20 September 2001	27 September 2001

Statistics by competition
Competition	Pld	W	D	L	GF	GA	GD	Win%
Prva HNL	30	20	5	5	61	28	+33	66.67
Croatian Football Cup	4	3	0	1	6	5	+1	75.00
UEFA Champions League	4	1	2	1	1	2	−1	25.00
UEFA Cup	2	0	1	1	2	3	−1	0.00
Total	40	24	8	8	70	38	+32	60.00

=== Prva HNL ===
==== Classification ====
Pos	Team	Pld	W	D	L	GF	GA	GD	Pts	Qualification or relegation
1	NK Zagreb (C)	30	20	7	3	71	24	+47	67	Qualification to Champions League second qualifying round
2	Hajduk Split	30	20	5	5	61	28	+33	65	Qualification to UEFA Cup qualifying round
3	Dinamo Zagreb	30	18	5	7	58	30	+28	59	Qualification to UEFA Cup first round
4	Varteks	30	17	6	7	58	40	+18	57	Qualification to UEFA Cup qualifying round
5	Rijeka	30	15	6	9	46	37	+9	51	Qualification to Intertoto Cup first round

Source: RSSSF.org
Rules for classification: 1) points; 2) goal difference; 3) number of goals scored.
(C) Champions

==== Results summary ====
Overall								Home						Away					
Pld	W	D	L	GF	GA	GD	Pts	W	D	L	GF	GA	GD	W	D	L	GF	GA	GD
30	20	5	5	61	28	+33	65	10	3	2	32	13	+19	10	2	3	29	15	+14

Last updated: 4 May 2002.
Source: Sportnet.hr

==== Results by round ====
Round	1	2	3	4	5	6	7	8	9	10	11	12	13	14	15	16	17	18	19	20	21	22	23	24	25	26	27	28	29	30
Ground	H	H	A	H	A	H	A	H	A	H	A	H	A	H	A	A	A	H	A	H	A	H	H	H	A	H	A	H	A	H
Result	D	W	L	L	W	W	W	W	W	W	W	W	W	D	L	W	W	L	D	D	W	W	D	W	W	W	W	W	L	W
Position	6	2	8	11	7	4	4	4	3	4	3	3	2	2	3	3	3	3	3	3	2	2	3	3	3	2	2	2	2	2

Source: Competitive matches
A = Away; H = Home; W = Win; D = Draw; L = Loss
Notes: Round 1 match was played between rounds 18 and 19, on 5 December 2001

==== Results by opponent ====
Team	Results		Points
Team	1	2	Points
Čakovec	3–0	3–0	6
Cibalia	1–0	1–1	4
Dinamo Zagreb	2–1	2–1	6
Hrvatski Dragovoljac	1–1	0–1	1
Kamen Ingrad	3–1	5–0	6
Marsonia	2–1	0–0	4
Osijek	2–1	2–2	4
Pomorac	3–0	1–0	6
Rijeka	4–1	2–1	6
Šibenik	2–1	1–0	6
Slaven Belupo	1–3	4–1	3
TŠK Topolovac	4–0	5–2	6
Varteks	1–5	0–0	1
Zadar	5–1	1–0	6
NK Zagreb	0–1	0–2	0

Source: 2001–02 Croatian First Football League article

== Matches ==
=== Prva HNL ===
4 August 2001 2	Hajduk Split	4–1	Rijeka	Zadar
18:00 CEST (UTC+02:00)	Deranja 36', 52'; Musa 43'; Bilić 73'	Report	Mijatović 45'	Stadium: Stadion Stanovi; Attendance: 6,000; Referee: Darko Feljan (Zagreb)

12 August 2001 3	NK Zagreb	1–0	Hajduk Split	Zagreb
17:30 CEST (UTC+02:00)	Lovrek 51'	Report		Stadium: Stadion Kranjčevićeva; Attendance: 5,000; Referee: Željko Širić (Osijek)

17 August 2001 4	Hajduk Split	1–5	Varteks	Split
20:00 CEST (UTC+02:00)	Deranja 45' (pen.); Miše (yellow card) 54' (yellow-red card) 59'; Srna (red card) 56'	Report	Sablić 29' (o.g.); Karić 35'; Mumlek 57' (pen.), 70', 84' (pen.)	Stadium: Stadion Poljud; Attendance: 5,000; Referee: Draženko Kovačić (Križevci)

26 August 2001 5	Marsonia	1–2	Hajduk Split	Slavonski Brod
17:00 CEST (UTC+02:00)	Matić 24'	Report	Deranja 19'; Vejić 77'	Stadium: Gradski stadion uz Savu; Attendance: 7,000; Referee: Goran Marić (Zagreb)

8 September 2001 6	Hajduk Split	4–0	TŠK Topolovac	Split
19:00 CEST (UTC+02:00)	Andrić 46'; Bilić 60', 71'; Radchenko 85'	Report		Stadium: Stadion Poljud; Attendance: 3,000; Referee: Ante Kulušić (Šibenik)

15 September 2001 7	Zadar	1–5	Hajduk Split	Zadar
16:30 CEST (UTC+02:00)	Butić 76' (pen.)	Report	Štimac 33'; Vejić 48'; Radchenko 70', 73'; Erceg 72'	Stadium: Stadion Stanovi; Attendance: 4,500; Referee: Željko Širić (Osijek)

23 September 2001 8	Hajduk Split	1–0	Cibalia	Split
18:00 CEST (UTC+02:00)	Bošnjak 36'	Report		Stadium: Stadion Poljud; Attendance: 2,500; Referee: Nikola Petir (Kašina)

30 September 2001 9	Šibenik	1–2	Hajduk Split	Šibenik
19:00 CEST (UTC+02:00)	Kosić 66'	Report	Deranja 25' (pen.); Erceg 32'	Stadium: Stadion Šubićevac; Attendance: 3,000; Referee: Goran Marić (Zagreb)

10 October 2001 10	Hajduk Split	3–0	Pomorac	Split
18:00 CEST (UTC+02:00)	Carević 18'; Vuković 84'; Radchenko 89'	Report		Stadium: Stadion Poljud; Attendance: 1,500; Referee: Željko Širić (Osijek)

14 October 2001 11	Dinamo Zagreb	1–2	Hajduk Split	Zagreb
18:00 CEST (UTC+02:00)	Smoje 22'	Report	Štimac 12'; Cesar 67' (o.g.)	Stadium: Stadion Maksimir; Attendance: 18,000; Referee: Draženko Kovačić (Križevci)

20 October 2001 12	Hajduk Split	3–0	Čakovec	Split
18:00 CEST (UTC+02:00)	Bošnjak 53'; Carević 55'; Đolonga 65'	Report		Stadium: Stadion Poljud; Attendance: 2,000; Referee: Nikola Petir (Kašina)

28 October 2001 13	Kamen Ingrad	1–3	Hajduk Split	Velika
16:30 CET (UTC+01:00)	Bognar 42'	Report	Erceg 26'; Deranja 55', 79'	Stadium: Stadion Kamen Ingrad; Attendance: 6,000; Referee: Dražen Komar (Zdenci Brdovečki)

3 November 2001 14	Hajduk Split	1–1	Hrvatski Dragovoljac	Split
17:00 CET (UTC+01:00)	Erceg 48'; Srna (red card) 49'	Report	Lalić 40' (pen.); Andračić (red card) 49'; Bisaku (yellow card) (yellow-red card) 54'	Stadium: Stadion Poljud; Attendance: 3,000; Referee: Draženko Kovačić (Križevci)

17 November 2001 15	Slaven Belupo	3–1	Hajduk Split	Koprivnica
14:00 CET (UTC+01:00)	Kovačić 3'; Jurčec 9'; Amižić (yellow card) 20' (yellow-red card) 72'; Radiček 62'	Report	Erceg 1'	Stadium: Gradski stadion Attendance: 3,500; Referee: Darko Feljan (Zagreb)

25 November 2001 16	Osijek	1–2	Hajduk Split	Osijek
17:00 CET (UTC+01:00)	Krpan 32'; Balatinac (red card) 56'	Report	Vejić 16', 54'	Stadium: Stadion Gradski vrt Attendance: 2,000; Referee: Ivan Novak (Varaždin)

28 November 2001 17	Rijeka	1–2	Hajduk Split	Rijeka
17:00 CET (UTC+01:00)	Brajković (yellow card) 59' (yellow-red card) 81'; Mijatović 64' (red card) 69'	Report	Andrić 48' (pen.), 76'	Stadium: Stadion Kantrida; Attendance: 6,000; Referee: Draženko Kovačić (Križevci)

2 December 2001 18	Hajduk Split	0–2	NK Zagreb	Split
17:00 CET (UTC+01:00)		Report	Poldrugač 7'; Stavrevski 70'	Stadium: Stadion Poljud; Attendance: 15,000; Referee: Željko Širić (Osijek)

5 December 2001 1	Hajduk Split	2–2	Osijek	Split
16:00 CET (UTC+01:00)	Erceg 56', 66'; Pletikosa (red card) 75'; Vejić (red card) 90'	Report	Balatinac 45'; Radics (yellow card) (yellow-red card) 56'; Turković (red card) 81'; Grnja 90' (pen.)	Stadium: Stadion Poljud; Attendance: 1,000; Referee: Goran Marić (Zagreb)

23 February 2002 19	Varteks	0–0	Hajduk Split	Varaždin
17:00 CET (UTC+01:00)		Report		Stadium: Stadion Varteks; Attendance: 7,000; Referee: Goran Marić (Zagreb)

2 March 2002 20	Hajduk Split	0–0	Marsonia	Split
17:00 CET (UTC+01:00)		Report		Stadium: Stadion Poljud; Attendance: 2,000; Referee: Darko Feljan (Zagreb)

6 March 2002 21	TŠK Topolovac	2–5	Hajduk Split	Sisak
15:00 CET (UTC+01:00)	Bobinec 83'; Ujević 89' (pen.)	Report	Bule 9'; Andrić 15'; Deranja 31', 58'; Bošnjak 44'; Pletikosa (red card) 88'	Stadium: Gradski stadion Attendance: 4,000; Referee: Nikola Petir (Kašina)

9 March 2002 22	Hajduk Split	1–0	Zadar	Split
17:00 CET (UTC+01:00)	Srna 47'	Report		Stadium: Stadion Poljud; Attendance: 1,000; Referee: Draženko Kovačić (Križevci)

17 March 2002 23	Cibalia	1–1	Hajduk Split	Vinkovci
15:30 CET (UTC+01:00)	Bartolović 30'	Report	Bule 40'	Stadium: Stadion HNK Cibalia; Attendance: 4,000; Referee: Željko Širić (Osijek)

23 March 2002 24	Hajduk Split	1–0	Šibenik	Split
15:30 CET (UTC+01:00)	Carević 37'	Report		Stadium: Stadion Poljud; Attendance: 1,000; Referee: Nikola Petir (Kašina)

30 March 2002 25	Pomorac	0–1	Hajduk Split	Kostrena
15:30 CET (UTC+01:00)		Report	Gudelj 85'	Stadium: Stadion Žuknica; Attendance: 2,000; Referee: Slavko Čulina (Zagreb)

7 April 2002 26	Hajduk Split	2–1	Dinamo Zagreb	Split
17:00 CEST (UTC+02:00)	Andrić 52' (pen.); Erceg 86'	Report	Zahora 28'	Stadium: Stadion Poljud; Attendance: 22,000; Referee: Željko Širić (Osijek)

13 April 2002 27	Čakovec	0–3	Hajduk Split	Čakovec
16:30 CEST (UTC+02:00)	Hucika (red card) 67'	Report	Sablić 17'; Lalić (red card) 67'; Erceg 72', 88'	Stadium: Stadion SRC Mladost; Attendance: 7,000; Referee: Hrvoje Kurtović (Osijek)

20 April 2002 28	Hajduk Split	5–0	Kamen Ingrad	Split
16:30 CEST (UTC+02:00)	Erceg 7', 10'; Deranja 63'; Đolonga 74', 84'	Report		Stadium: Stadion Poljud; Attendance: 4,000; Referee: Ivan Bebek (Rijeka)

27 April 2002 29	Hrvatski Dragovoljac	1–0	Hajduk Split	Zagreb
17:00 CEST (UTC+02:00)	Petrović 47'; Andračić (red card) 78'	Report		Stadium: Stadion NŠC Stjepan Spajić; Attendance: 1,500; Referee: Draženko Kovačić (Križevci)

4 May 2002 30	Hajduk Split	4–1	Slaven Belupo	Split
17:30 CEST (UTC+02:00)	Carević 24'; Gudelj 84'; Erceg 89'; Deranja 90'	Report	Filipović 52'	Stadium: Stadion Poljud; Attendance: 800; Referee: Darko Feljan (Zagreb)

Source: hajduk.hr

=== Croatian Football Cup ===
16 October 2001 R1	Podravina	0–1 (a.e.t.)	Hajduk Split	Ludbreg
15:30 CEST (UTC+02:00)		Report	Deranja 93'	Stadium: Stadion NK Podravina; Attendance: 1,200; Referee: Vlado Svilokos (Sisak)

25 October 2001 R2	Dilj	1–2	Hajduk Split	Vinkovci
15:00 CEST (UTC+02:00)	Jerkić 13' (pen.)	Report	Musa (penalty missed) 2'; Radchenko (red card) 15'; Susa 43'; Carević 79'	Stadium: Stadion NK Dilj; Attendance: 1,200; Referee: Ivan Bebek (Rijeka)

21 November 2001 QF	Hajduk Split	1–3	Varteks	Split
16:30 CET (UTC+01:00)	Đolonga 38'	Report	Bjelanović 10', 47'; Sablić 25' (o.g.)	Stadium: Stadion Poljud; Attendance: 1,500; Referee: Darko Feljan (Zagreb)

9 December 2001 QF	Varteks	1–2 (4–3 agg.)	Hajduk Split	Varaždin
15:00 CET (UTC+01:00)	Hrman 24'	Report	Srna 11'; Erceg 54'	Stadium: Stadion Varteks; Attendance: 1,000; Referee: Željko Širić (Osijek)

Source: hajduk.hr

=== Champions League ===
==== Second qualifying round ====
25 July 2001 First leg	Ferencváros (Hungary)	0–0	(Croatia) Hajduk Split	Budapest, Hungary
20:15 CEST (UTC+02:00)		Report		Stadium: Stadion Albert Flórián; Attendance: 9,259; Referee: Mikko Vuorela (Finland)

1 August 2001 Second leg	Hajduk Split (Croatia)	0–0 (a.e.t.) (0–0 agg.) (5–4 p)	(Hungary) Ferencváros	Split, Croatia
20:15 CEST (UTC+02:00)		Report		Stadium: Stadion Poljud; Attendance: 26,400; Referee: Orhan Erdemir (Turkey)
	Penalties
	Asanović (penalty scored); Srna (penalty missed); Carević (penalty scored); Deranja (penalty scored); Štimac (penalty scored); Musa (penalty scored)		(penalty missed) Alex Arruda; (penalty scored) Pinte; (penalty scored) Szkukalek; (penalty scored) Lipcsei; (penalty scored) Vén; (penalty missed) Dragóner

==== Third qualifying round ====
8 August 2001 First leg	Hajduk Split (Croatia)	1–0	(Spain) Mallorca	Split, Croatia
20:15 CEST (UTC+02:00)	Bilić 29'	Report		Stadium: Stadion Poljud; Attendance: 26,922; Referee: Alain Sars (France)

21 August 2001 Second leg	Mallorca (Spain)	2–0 (a.e.t.) (2–1 agg.)	(Croatia) Hajduk Split	Palma de Mallorca, Spain
21:30 CEST (UTC+02:00)	Eto'o 25'; Luque 92'	Report		Stadium: Estadi de Son Moix; Attendance: 23,500; Referee: Hugh Dallas (Scotland)

=== UEFA Cup ===
==== First round ====
20 September 2001 First leg	Hajduk Split (Croatia)	2–2	(Poland) Wisła Kraków	Split, Croatia
20:30 CEST (UTC+02:00)	Deranja 22'; Srna 87'	Report	Żurawski 51'; Moskalewicz 90+3'	Stadium: Stadion Poljud; Attendance: 10,386; Referee: António Almeida Costa (Portugal)

27 September 2001 Second leg	Wisła Kraków (Poland)	1–0 (3–2 agg.)	(Croatia) Hajduk Split	Kraków, Poland
15:00 CEST (UTC+02:00)	Frankowski 22'	Report		Stadium: Stadion Miejski; Attendance: 3,919; Referee: Georgios Borovilos (Greece)

Source: hajduk.hr

== Player seasonal records ==
=== Top scorers ===
Rank	Name	League	Europe	Cup	Total
1	(Croatia) Tomislav Erceg	13	1	1	15
2	(Croatia) Zvonimir Deranja	11	1	1	13
3	(Croatia) Mario Carević	4	–	1	5
3	(Croatia) Hrvoje Vejić	4	–	1	5
5	(Croatia) Srđan Andrić	4	–	–	4
5	(Croatia) Mate Bilić	3	1	–	4
5	(Croatia) Vlatko Đolonga	3	–	1	4
5	(Russia) Dmitri Radchenko	4	–	–	4
9	(Croatia) Ivan Bošnjak	3	–	–	3
9	(Croatia) Nino Bule	2	–	–	3
9	(Croatia) Darijo Srna	1	1	1	3
12	(Croatia) Hrvatin Gudelj	2	–	–	2
12	(Croatia) Igor Štimac	2	–	–	2
14	(Croatia) Igor Musa	1	–	–	1
14	(Croatia) Goran Sablić	1	–	–	1
14	(Australia) Zeljko Susa	–	–	1	1
14	(Croatia) Hrvoje Vuković	1	–	–	1
	Own goals	1	–	–	1
	TOTALS	61	3	6	70

Source: Competitive matches

== See also ==
- 2001–02 Croatian First Football League
- 2001–02 Croatian Football Cup

== External sources ==
- 2001–02 Prva HNL at HRnogomet.com
- 2001–02 Croatian Cup at HRnogomet.com
- 2001–02 UEFA Champions League at rsssf.com
- 2001–02 UEFA Cup at rsssf.com
