= 2003 Croatian Football Cup final =

- Event: 2002–03 Croatian Cup
Uljanik Pula	Hajduk Split
0	5

First leg
Uljanik Pula	Hajduk Split
0	1
- Date: 21 May 2003
- Venue: Stadion Aldo Drosina, Pula
- Man of the Match: Nino Bule (Hajduk Split)
- Referee: Željko Širić (Osijek)
- Attendance: 5,000
- Weather: Cloudy

Second leg
Hajduk Split	Uljanik Pula
4	0
- Date: 4 June 2003
- Venue: Stadion Poljud, Split
- Man of the Match: Almir Turković (Hajduk Split)
- Referee: Goran Marić (Zagreb)
- Attendance: 12,000
- Weather: Clear

The 2003 Croatian Cup final was a two-legged affair played between Uljanik Pula and Hajduk Split. The first leg was played in Pula on 21 May 2003, while the second leg on 4 June 2003 in Split.

Hajduk Split won the trophy with an aggregate result of 5–0.

== Road to the final ==
Uljanik Pula		Round	Hajduk Split	
Opponent	Result		Opponent	Result
Ivančica	11–1	First round	bye	
Hrvatski Dragovoljac	2–1	Preliminary round	Pag	7–2
Grafičar Vodovod	6–0	Second round	TŠK Topolovac	1–0
Osijek	0–0	Quarter-finals	Cibalia	3–1
Osijek	4–1	Quarter-finals	Cibalia	4–0
Kamen Ingrad	1–1	Semi-finals	Varteks	2–0
Kamen Ingrad	4–0	Semi-finals	Varteks	0–0

== First leg ==
21 May 2003
17:00

Uljanik Pula	0–1	Hajduk Split
	Report (in Croatian)	Bule 49'

Stadion Aldo Drosina, Pula
Attendance: 5,000
Referee: Željko Širić (Osijek)

ULJANIK PULA:
GK	1	(Croatia) Siniša Ćaleta
DF	2	(Croatia) Damir Šistek		(substituted off) 68'
DF	6	(Croatia) Kristijan Dadić (c)
DF	7	(Croatia) Ivan Kurtović
MF	3	(Croatia) Davor Lasić
MF	8	(Croatia) Danijel Ostović	Booked
MF	10	(Croatia) Dragan Raković		(substituted off) 72'
MF	14	(Croatia) Dalibor Pauletić
FW	13	(Croatia) Darko Deranja		(substituted off) 85'
FW	19	(Croatia) Igor Žiković
FW	20	(Croatia) Marin Mikać
Substitutes:
MF	16	(Croatia) Elmir Osmanović		(substituted on) 68'
FW	9	(Croatia) Vedran Stošić	Booked	(substituted on) 72'
MF	18	(Croatia) Ljupko Kontešić		(substituted on) 85'
Manager:
(Croatia) Elvis Scoria

HAJDUK SPLIT:
GK	1	(Croatia) Stipe Pletikosa (c)
DF	15	(Croatia) Dario Brgles		(substituted off) 68'
DF	17	(Croatia) Hrvoje Vuković
DF	23	(Croatia) Mato Neretljak	Booked
MF	10	(Croatia) Mario Carević		(substituted off) 83'
MF	18	(Croatia) Darijo Srna
MF	20	(Croatia) Dean Računica
MF	22	(Croatia) Ante Miše	Booked
MF	26	(Croatia) Milan Rapaić
FW	5	(Bosnia and Herzegovina) Almir Turković		(substituted off) 85'
FW	8	(Croatia) Nino Bule
Substitutes:
FW	11	(Croatia) Zvonimir Deranja		(substituted on) 68'
DF	7	(Croatia) Hrvoje Vejić		(substituted on) 83'
FW	13	(Croatia) Petar Krpan		(substituted on) 85'
Manager:
(Croatia) Zoran Vulić

Assistant referees:
Dragutin Vuk (Sveti Juraj u Trnju)
Darko Slivar (Valpovo)

Match rules

- 90 minutes.
- Seven named substitutes.
- Maximum of three substitutions.

== Second leg ==
4 June 2003
17:45

Hajduk Split	4–0	Uljanik Pula
Pletikosa 19' (pen.); Rapaić 27'; Turković 36'; Deranja 82'	Report (in Croatian)

Stadion Poljud, Split
Attendance: 12,000
Referee: Goran Marić (Zagreb)

HAJDUK SPLIT:
GK	1	(Croatia) Stipe Pletikosa (c)
DF	7	(Croatia) Hrvoje Vejić
DF	17	(Croatia) Hrvoje Vuković
DF	23	(Croatia) Mato Neretljak
MF	10	(Croatia) Mario Carević
MF	14	(Croatia) Srđan Andrić
MF	18	(Croatia) Darijo Srna	(substituted off) 69'
MF	20	(Croatia) Dean Računica
MF	26	(Croatia) Milan Rapaić	(substituted off) 69'
FW	5	(Bosnia and Herzegovina) Almir Turković
FW	8	(Croatia) Nino Bule	(substituted off) 79'
Substitutes:
DF	15	(Croatia) Dario Brgles	(substituted on) 69'
FW	13	(Croatia) Petar Krpan	(substituted on) 69'
FW	11	(Croatia) Zvonimir Deranja	(substituted on) 79'
Manager:
(Croatia) Zoran Vulić

ULJANIK PULA:
GK	1	(Croatia) Siniša Ćaleta
DF	2	(Croatia) Damir Šistek
DF	5	(Croatia) Ognjen Ugrčić
DF	6	(Croatia) Kristijan Dadić (c)
MF	3	(Croatia) Davor Lasić
MF	8	(Croatia) Danijel Ostović	(substituted off) 70'
MF	14	(Croatia) Dalibor Pauletić	(substituted off) 84'
MF	18	(Croatia) Ljupko Kontešić
FW	9	(Croatia) Vedran Stošić
FW	13	(Croatia) Darko Deranja
FW	19	(Croatia) Igor Žiković	(substituted off) 65'
Substitutes:
FW	20	(Croatia) Marin Mikać	(substituted on) 65'
MF	11	(Croatia) Zedi Ramadani	(substituted on) 70'
	4	(Croatia) Tomislav Černjul	(substituted on) 84'
Manager:
(Croatia) Elvis Scoria

Assistant referees:
Josip Stipković (Zagreb)
Branko Kožarec (Domaslovec)

Match rules

- 90 minutes.
- Penalty shoot-out if scores still level; no extra time.
- Seven named substitutes.
- Maximum of three substitutions.
