= Adriatic derby =

Football rivalry in Croatia

Adriatic Derby
- Other names: Jadranski derbi
- Location: Croatia
- Teams: Hajduk Split and Rijeka
- First meeting: 20 October 1946
- Latest meeting: Rijeka 3–0 Hajduk Split; 2026–27 SuperSport HNL (20 September 2026)
- Next meeting: 12 December 2026

Statistics
- Total meetings: 185 (168 league)
- Most wins: HNK Hajduk Split (68)
- Most player appearances: Tomislav Erceg (24)
- Top scorer: Mijo Caktaš (10)
- Largest victory: Rijeka 5–0 Hajduk Split (22 November 2025)

Adriatic derby (Croatian: Jadranski derbi) is the name given to matches between two largest Croatian football clubs coming from the Adriatic coast, Hajduk Split and Rijeka. The teams are supported by their fanbases called Split's Torcida and Rijeka's Armada.

Games of note are the 1986–87 Yugoslav Cup final when Hajduk won the cup and the 2004–05 Croatian Football Cup final, when Rijeka won the trophy. In the penultimate round of the 1998–99 Croatian First Football League season at Stadion Poljud, Rijeka won 3–1, and the entire stadium began to applaud the Rijeka footballers, including the Hajduk fans. This was unusual, especially for such big rivals. Another notable derby took place on 9 September 1962 in Rijeka. This game is noteworthy, or rather infamous, as numerous rocks collapsed off the cliff at Stadion Kantrida, in process injuring 96 supporters.

Due to various formats that were used in the Croatian championship and the cup competition format (which has teams playing two-legged fixtures even in the final game) and in addition to the games played in the Supercup, there has been anywhere from two to seven derbies per season. For example, 14 derbies were played between March 2005 and November 2006. Due to Rijeka's absence from the Yugoslav First League, no games have been played between 1947 and 1958, and from 1969 to 1974, except for a cup game in 1971.

== Results ==
=== By competition ===
Competition	Played	Hajduk wins	Draws	Rijeka wins	Hajduk goals	Rijeka goals
Yugoslav championship (1946–1991)
League	58	24	23	11	90	61
Yugoslav Cup	5	1	2	2	5	6
Yugoslavia totals	63	25	25	13	95	67
Croatian championship (1992–present)
HNL	110	41	28	41	141	147
Croatian Cup	11	1	5	5	12	16
Supercup	1	1	0	0	1	0
Croatia totals	122	43	33	46	154	163
All Time	185	68	58	59	249	230

Last updated on 20 September 2026.

=== By ground ===
Ground	Played	Hajduk wins	Draws	Rijeka wins	Hajduk goals	Rijeka goals
Poljud, Split	71	33	19	19	120	86
Kantrida, Rijeka	67	17	25	25	67	89
Rujevica, Rijeka	24	6	6	12	17	33
Plinara, Split	17	11	3	3	36	16
Cellini, Rijeka	1	0	1	0	1	1
Hr. Vitezovi, Dugopolje	1	0	1	0	1	1
JNA, Belgrade	1	0	1	0	1	1
Lapad, Dubrovnik	1	0	1	0	1	1
Stanovi, Zadar	1	1	0	0	4	1
Šubićevac, Šibenik	1	0	1	0	1	1

Last updated on 20 September 2026.

== List of matches ==
=== Key ===
Match ended in a draw
Hajduk win
Rijeka win

=== 1946–1991 ===
M	Date	Competition	Ground	Score	Hajduk scorers	Rijeka scorers
1	20 Oct 1946	Div 1	Plinara	1–0	Batinić	
2	3 Mar 1947	Div 1	Cellini	1–1	F. Matošić	Petronio
3	9 Nov 1958	Div 1	Kantrida	1–1	Papec	Lukarić
4	7 Jun 1959	Div 1	Plinara	6–2	Bego (4), Anković, Šenauer	Lalić, Veselica
5	13 Sep 1959	Div 1	Plinara	4–0	Bego (2), Žanetić, Šenauer	
6	27 Mar 1960	Div 1	Kantrida	1–1	o.g.	Medle
7	4 Dec 1960	Div 1	Plinara	3–2	Anković, Šenauer, B. Vukas	Medle, Ilić (o.g.)
8	11 Jun 1961	Div 1	Kantrida	1–2	Anković, Bego	Lukarić
9	5 Nov 1961	Div 1	Šubićevac	1–1	Papec	Zadel
10	2 May 1962	Div 1	Kantrida	0–0		
11	9 Sep 1962	Div 1	Kantrida	4–0		Zadel (2), Veselica, Lukarić
12	24 Mar 1963	Div 1	Plinara	0–2		Naumović, Veselica
13	1 Dec 1963	Div 1	Kantrida	1–1	Ferić	Jantoljak
14	7 Jun 1964	Div 1	Plinara	3–0	Hlevnjak (2), Anković	
15	6 Sep 1964	Div 1	Plinara	1–1	Hlevnjak	Lukarić
16	4 Apr 1965	Div 1	Kantrida	4–1	D. Slišković	Gulin, Rabac, Tomljenović, Naumović
17	24 Oct 1965	Div 1	Plinara	4–0	Nadoveza (2), D. Slišković, Hlevnjak	
18	24 Apr 1966	Div 1	Kantrida	2–0		B. Bursać, Vukoje
19	4 Sep 1966	Div 1	Kantrida	0–2	Mušović (2)	
20	19 Mar 1967	Div 1	Plinara	1–0	Hlevnjak	
21	11 Dec 1967	Div 1	Kantrida	1–0		B. Bursać
22	30 Jun 1968	Div 1	Plinara	4–2	Nadoveza (3), Hlevnjak	Perčić, B. Bursać
23	22 Sep 1968	Div 1	Kantrida	0–0		
24	13 Apr 1969	Div 1	Plinara	3–0	Mušović (2), Nadoveza	
25	28 Feb 1971	Cup (R16)	Kantrida	3–2	Zrilić, Jerković	Malvić, B. Bursać, Devčić
26	8 Dec 1974	Div 1	Plinara	1–0	Mijač	
27	29 Jun 1975	Div 1	Kantrida	1–4	Žungul (3), Mijač	Skoblar
28	13 Sep 1975	Div 1	Plinara	1–3	Peruzović	Skoblar (2), Machin
29	4 Apr 1976	Div 1	Kantrida	1–2	Jerković (2)	Čerić
30	27 Oct 1976	Div 1	Plinara	0–0		
31	15 May 1977	Div 1	Kantrida	1–1	Đorđević	Kustudić
32	16 Oct 1977	Div 1	Kantrida	2–0		Kustudić, Hrstić
33	26 Feb 1978	Cup (QF)	Plinara	0–1		Kustudić
34	30 Apr 1978	Div 1	Plinara	2–2	Jerković, Da. Čop	Radin, Radović
35	29 Nov 1978	Div 1	Kantrida	2–2	Žungul, Primorac	Fegic, Mijač
36	10 Jun 1979	Div 1	Plinara	2–1	Krstičević, Luketin	Machin
37	3 Nov 1979	Div 1	Kantrida	2–0		Radović (2)
38	15 Jun 1980	Div 1	Poljud	4–1	Zo. Vujović (2), Gudelj, Krstičević	Ružić
39	30 Nov 1980	Div 1	Poljud	2–0	Zl. Vujović (2)	
40	10 Jun 1981	Div 1	Kantrida	2–2	Zl. Vujović, Gudelj	Machin, Tomić
41	31 Oct 1981	Div 1	Poljud	2–0	Šalov (2)	
42	25 Apr 1982	Div 1	Kantrida	1–1	Zo. Vujović	Gračan
43	1 Sep 1982	Div 1	Kantrida	1–1	Pešić	Tomić
44	27 Mar 1983	Div 1	Poljud	1–0	Šalov	
45	27 Nov 1983	Div 1	Kantrida	1–1	Zl. Vujović	Desnica
46	27 May 1984	Div 1	Poljud	0–0		
47	18 Nov 1984	Div 1	Kantrida	1–1	Z. Vulić	Fegic
48	9 Jun 1985	Div 1	Poljud	5–2	Zl. Vujović (2), Gudelj (2), Asanović	Valenčić (2)
49	18 Aug 1985	Div 1	Poljud	1–0	Gudelj	
50	9 Mar 1986	Div 1	Kantrida	3–0		J. Janković, Malbaša (2)
51	10 Aug 1986	Div 1	Kantrida	2–2	Gračan, Deverić	J. Janković (2)
52	22 Feb 1987	Div 1	Poljud	2–0	Deverić, Bučan	
53	9 May 1987	Cup (F)	Stadion JNA	1–1 (9–8 p)	Asanović	Radmanović
54	7 Oct 1987	Div 1	Poljud	3–0	M. Bursać (2), Čelić	
55	1 May 1988	Div 1	Kantrida	3–1	Krstović	Mladenović (2), J. Janković
56	4 Dec 1988	Div 1	Kantrida	0–0 (1–3 p)		
57	28 May 1989	Div 1	Poljud	4–0	Čelić (2), Pejović, Jarni	
58	30 Jul 1989	Div 1	Kantrida	1–0		Paliska
59	10 Dec 1989	Div 1	Poljud	1–1 (3–4 p)	Vučević	R. Vešović
60	16 Sep 1990	Div 1	Poljud	1–1 (6–7 p)	Bokšić	Komljenović
61	10 Oct 1990	Cup (QF)	Kantrida	0–1	Jarni	
62	21 Nov 1990	Cup (QF)	Lapad	1–1	Vučević	Komljenović
63	23 Mar 1991	Div 1	Kantrida	0–0 (1–3 p)		

=== 1992–present ===
M	Date	Competition	Ground	Score	Hajduk scorers	Rijeka scorers	Attendance	Report
1	21 Mar 1992	1. HNL	Poljud	3–0	Vučević (2), Kozniku		10,000	HRnogomet.com
2	24 Mar 1992	Cup (QF)	Kantrida	0–0			3,000	HRnogomet.com
3	21 Apr 1992	Cup (QF)	Poljud	1–1	Jeličić	Černe	8,000	HRnogomet.com
4	16 May 1992	1. HNL	Kantrida	0–2	Kozniku, Jeličić		6,000	HRnogomet.com
5	1 Nov 1992	1. HNL	Kantrida	0–0			7,000	HRnogomet.com
6	16 May 1993	1. HNL	Poljud	3–0	Mornar, Jeličić, Rapaić		5,000	HRnogomet.com
7	12 Dec 1993	1. HNL	Poljud	0–2		Mladenović (2)	3,500	HRnogomet.com
8	13 Apr 1994	Cup (SF)	Kantrida	0–0			12,000	HRnogomet.com
9	27 Apr 1994	Cup (SF)	Poljud	3–3	Hibić, Kozniku, Balajić	Raković, Praženica (o.g.), Pavličić	15,000	HRnogomet.com
10	8 Jun 1994	1. HNL	Kantrida	2–1	Balajić	Samardžić, Mladenović	4,000	HRnogomet.com
11	10 Sep 1994	1. HNL	Poljud	5–2	H. Vukas (2), T. Erceg (2), Računica	Tokić, Dželalija	3,500	HRnogomet.com
12	19 Mar 1995	1. HNL	Kantrida	0–1	Jurčec		6,000	HRnogomet.com
13	1 Oct 1995	1. HNL	Poljud	1–0	Pralija		4,000	HRnogomet.com
14	17 Feb 1996	1. HNL	Kantrida	0–3	Rapaić (2), Jurčec		6,000	HRnogomet.com
15	13 Oct 1996	1. HNL	Poljud	1–0	Vučko		8,000	HRnogomet.com
16	26 Apr 1997	1. HNL	Kantrida	1–3	Dalić, Skoko, Vučko	Tokić	7,000	HRnogomet.com
17	12 Sep 1997	1. HNL	Poljud	2–1	Bulat, T. Erceg	Cimirotič	5,000	HRnogomet.com
18	7 Dec 1997	1. HNL	Kantrida	1–1	Vučko	Benedejčič	7,000	HRnogomet.com
19	20 Sep 1998	1. HNL	Poljud	3–1	Deranja (2), Računica	Musa	6,000	HRnogomet.com
20	13 Dec 1998	1. HNL	Kantrida	2–1	Deranja	Hasančić (2)	15,000	HRnogomet.com
21	2 May 1999	1. HNL	Kantrida	3–3	Baturina, Vučko, Biliškov	Hasančić, Balaban, Sztipanovics	20,000	HRnogomet.com
22	23 May 1999	1. HNL	Poljud	1–3	Miladin	B. Čačić, Hasančić, Sztipanovics	40,000	HRnogomet.com
23	29 Aug 1999	1. HNL	Kantrida	1–2	Musa, Bilić	Agić	7,000	HRnogomet.com
24	23 Nov 1999	1. HNL	Poljud	3–2	Baturina (2), Leko	Sztipanovics, Balaban	5,000	HRnogomet.com
25	29 Apr 2000	1. HNL	Kantrida	2–0		Gjuzelov (o.g.), Hasančić	5,000	HRnogomet.com
26	9 Sep 2000	1. HNL	Kantrida	0–0			6,000	HRnogomet.com
27	26 Nov 2000	1. HNL	Poljud	3–0	Leko (2), Bubalo		2,500	Sportnet.hr
28	4 Aug 2001	1. HNL	Stanovi	4–1	Deranja (2), Musa, Bilić	Mijatović	6,000	Sportnet.hr
29	28 Nov 2001	1. HNL	Kantrida	1–2	Andrić (2)	Mijatović	6,000	Sportnet.hr
30	3 Aug 2002	1. HNL	Poljud	2–1	Carević, Računica	G. Brajković	8,000	Sportnet.hr
31	2 Nov 2002	1. HNL	Kantrida	0–1	Deranja		5,000	Sportnet.hr
32	20 Sep 2003	1. HNL	Kantrida	1–2	Bule (2)	Klić	7,000	Sportnet.hr
33	28 Feb 2004	1. HNL	Poljud	4–0	Krpan, Bule, Turković, Grgurović		4,000	HRnogomet.com
34	10 Apr 2004	1. HNL	Kantrida	0–1	Đolonga		4,000	Sportnet.hr
35	8 May 2004	1. HNL	Poljud	2–0	Vejić, Deranja		4,000	Sportnet.hr
36	2 Oct 2004	1. HNL	Poljud	2–0	F. Čačić, Munhoz		5,000	Sportnet.hr
37	12 Mar 2005	1. HNL	Kantrida	2–0		Lerant, Mujdža	8,000	Sportnet.hr
38	9 Apr 2005	1. HNL	Poljud	1–1	Munhoz	Novaković	10,000	Sportnet.hr
39	11 May 2005	Cup (F)	Kantrida	2–1	Đolonga	Mitu, T. Erceg	8,000	SD.hr
40	14 May 2005	1. HNL	Kantrida	1–1	Dragičević	T. Erceg	6,500	Sportnet.hr
41	25 May 2005	Cup (F)	Poljud	0–1		Mitu	20,000	SD.hr
42	15 Jul 2005	Supercup	Poljud	1–0	Kranjčar		20,000	SD.hr
43	17 Sep 2005	1. HNL	Poljud	0–1		Ah. Sharbini	14,000	Sportnet.hr
44	18 Feb 2006	1. HNL	Kantrida	1–0		Novaković	7,500	Sportnet.hr
45	18 Mar 2006	1. HNL	Kantrida	1–1	Hrgović	Vugrinec	6,000	Sportnet.hr
46	29 Mar 2006	Cup (SF)	Poljud	1–1	Kranjčar	Vugrinec	8,000	SD.hr
47	5 Apr 2006	Cup (SF)	Kantrida	1–0		Novaković	7,000	SD.hr
48	22 Apr 2006	1. HNL	Poljud	0–4		Vugrinec (3), Ah. Sharbini	3,000	Sportnet.hr
49	26 Aug 2006	1. HNL	Kantrida	0–1	Kranjčar		6,000	Sportnet.hr
50	18 Nov 2006	1. HNL	Poljud	3–0	Bušić (2), Carević		6,500	Sportnet.hr
51	12 May 2007	1. HNL	Poljud	2–2	Bušić, Peraić	Budicin, Ivanov	2,500	Sportnet.hr
52	22 Sep 2007	1. HNL	Kantrida	4–0		Škoro, An. Sharbini, Ivanov, Đalović	8,000	Sportnet.hr
53	23 Feb 2008	1. HNL	Poljud	1–1	Verpakovskis	An. Sharbini	8,000	Sportnet.hr
54	26 Apr 2008	1. HNL	Kantrida	1–1	Du. Čop	An. Sharbini	4,000	Sportnet.hr
55	17 Aug 2008	1. HNL	Kantrida	3–1	Kalinić	Čagalj, An. Sharbini, Križman	4,000	Sportnet.hr
56	16 Nov 2008	1. HNL	Poljud	2–0	Bodrušić (o.g.), Ibričić		7,000	Sportnet.hr
57	10 May 2009	1. HNL	Kantrida	2–1	Vejić	Pamić, Ah. Sharbini	7,000	Sportnet.hr
58	23 Aug 2009	1. HNL	Kantrida	2–0		Fernandez (2)	7,000	Sportnet.hr
59	13 Mar 2010	1. HNL	Poljud	1–1	Skoko	Kreilach	10,000	Sportnet.hr
60	19 Sep 2010	1. HNL	Kantrida	0–1	Brkljača		8,000	Sportnet.hr
61	2 Apr 2011	1. HNL	Poljud	1–1	Vukušić	Budicin	6,000	Sportnet.hr
62	7 Aug 2011	1. HNL	Poljud	2–1	Vukušić, Andrić	Švrljuga	10,000	Sportnet.hr
63	21 Mar 2012	1. HNL	Kantrida	0–3	Vukušić (2), Caktaš		6,500	Sportnet.hr
64	1 Sep 2012	1. HNL	Kantrida	1–0		Kreilach	7,500	Sportnet.hr
65	2 Dec 2012	1. HNL	Poljud	1–1	Maglica	Benko	6,000	Sportnet.hr
66	28 Apr 2013	1. HNL	Poljud	1–2	Sušić	Mujanović, Benko	8,000	Sportnet.hr
67	21 Jul 2013	1. HNL	Poljud	1–1	Maglica	Kvržić	20,000	Sportnet.hr
68	28 Sep 2013	1. HNL	Kantrida	1–1	Kouassi	Benko	10,000	Sportnet.hr
69	15 Dec 2013	1. HNL	Poljud	2–2	Bradarić, Maloča	Benko, Kramarić	8,000	Sportnet.hr
70	6 Apr 2014	1. HNL	Kantrida	4–1	Mario Pašalić	Krstanović (2), An. Sharbini (2)	10,000	Sportnet.hr
71	27 Jul 2014	1. HNL	Kantrida	4–2	Samardžić (o.g.), Caktaš	Kramarić (3), An. Sharbini	9,000	Sportnet.hr
72	5 Oct 2014	1. HNL	H. vitezovi	1–1	Caktaš	Kvržić	5,000	Sportnet.hr
73	18 Feb 2015	1. HNL	Kantrida	3–0		Jugović (2), Balaj	8,000	Sportnet.hr
74	18 Apr 2015	1. HNL	Poljud	1–2	F. Tudor	Tomečak, M. Vešović	6,500	Sportnet.hr
75	15 Aug 2015	1. HNL	Rujevica	0–0			5,287	Hnl.hr
76	1 Nov 2015	1. HNL	Poljud	0–3		Bezjak, Tomasov, Balaj	24,621	Hnl.hr
77	27 Feb 2016	1. HNL	Rujevica	1–0		Samardžić	5,450	Hnl.hr
78	24 Apr 2016	1. HNL	Poljud	1–2	Sušić	M. Vešović, Gavranović	6,369	Hnl.hr
79	21 Aug 2016	1. HNL	Poljud	2–4	Ohandza, Ismajli	Gavranović, Bezjak (2), Andrijašević	10,374	Hnl.hr
80	5 Nov 2016	1. HNL	Rujevica	2–1	Futács	Elez (2)	5,508	Hnl.hr
81	11 Mar 2017	1. HNL	Poljud	1–1	Barry	Bezjak	15,462	Hnl.hr
82	13 May 2017	1. HNL	Rujevica	2–0		Maleš, Gavranović	5,792	Hnl.hr
83	17 Sep 2017	1. HNL	Poljud	0–2		Héber (2)	18,108	Hnl.hr
84	2 Dec 2017	1. HNL	Rujevica	1–2	Bašić, A. Erceg	Bradarić	6,349	Hnl.hr
85	31 Mar 2018	1. HNL	Poljud	1–1	Caktaš	Čolak	15,690	Hnl.hr
86	19 May 2018	1. HNL	Rujevica	3–1	Said	Čolak, Pavičić, Puljić	7,039	Hnl.hr
87	12 Aug 2018	1. HNL	Rujevica	1–1	Caktaš	Puljić	7,122	Hnl.hr
88	28 Oct 2018	1. HNL	Poljud	1–1	Said	Gorgon	0	Hnl.hr
89	16 Feb 2019	1. HNL	Rujevica	0–0			6,527	Hnl.hr
90	20 Apr 2019	1. HNL	Poljud	4–0	Jurić, Barry, Caktaš (2)		14,752	Hnl.hr
91	15 Sep 2019	1. HNL	Rujevica	1–1	Teklić	Andrijašević	7,108	Hnl.hr
92	1 Dec 2019	1. HNL	Poljud	0–4		Acosty, Raspopović, Gorgon, Halilović	13,605	Hnl.hr
93	8 Mar 2020	1. HNL	Rujevica	2–0		Čolak, Gorgon	7,326	Hnl.hr
94	19 Jul 2020	1. HNL	Poljud	2–3	Eduok, Caktaš	Čolak (2), Galović	0	Hnl.hr
95	6 Dec 2020	1. HNL	Poljud	1–2	Caktaš	Lončar, Menalo	0	Hnl.hr
96	10 Feb 2021	1. HNL	Rujevica	0–1	Caktaš		0	Hnl.hr
97	27 Feb 2021	1. HNL	Rujevica	0–1	Nayir		0	Hnl.hr
98	1 May 2021	1. HNL	Poljud	3–2	Biuk, Štefulj (o.g.), Kačaniklić	Drmić, Andrijašević	0	Hnl.hr
99	29 Aug 2021	1. HNL	Poljud	1–2	Elez	Tomečak, Drmić	15,967	Hnl.hr
100	21 Nov 2021	1. HNL	Rujevica	2–3	Livaja (2), Mlakar	Drmić, Murić	6,578	Hnl.hr
101	26 Feb 2022	1. HNL	Poljud	1–3	Livaja	Drmić, Vučkić, Krešić	11,453	Hnl.hr
102	8 May 2022	1. HNL	Rujevica	0–3	Livaja (2), Mikanović		7,485	Hnl.hr
103	26 May 2022	Cup (F)	Poljud	1–3	Ferro, Melnjak (2)	Drmić	29,411	Hns.hr
104	14 Sep 2022	HNL	Poljud	2–0	Biuk, Kalinić		13,867	Hnl.hr
105	2 Oct 2022	HNL	Rujevica	0–1	Awaziem		5,844	Hnl.hr
106	5 Feb 2023	HNL	Poljud	1–2	Livaja	Ampem, Frigan	13,098	Hnl.hr
107	16 Apr 2023	HNL	Rujevica	2–0		Frigan, Marin	7,749	Hnl.hr
108	30 Jul 2023	HNL	Poljud	1–0	Pukštas		32,584	Hnl.hr
109	7 Oct 2023	HNL	Rujevica	1–0		N. Janković	8,071	Hnl.hr
110	28 Jan 2024	HNL	Poljud	1–2	Pukštas	Obregón, Selahi	32,621	Hnl.hr
111	7 Apr 2024	HNL	Rujevica	1–0		Marco Pašalić	8,091	Hnl.hr
112	29 Sep 2024	HNL	Rujevica	0–0			7,505	Hnl.hr
113	15 Dec 2024	HNL	Poljud	2–2	Kalik (2)	N. Janković, Selahi	29,489	Hnl.hr
114	26 Feb 2025	Cup (QF)	Poljud	1–3	Livaja	Djouahra, Fruk (2)	19,340	Hns.hr
115	16 Mar 2025	HNL	Rujevica	3–0		Fruk (2), N. Janković	8,095	Hnl.hr
116	17 May 2025	HNL	Poljud	2–1	Livaja, Trajkovski	Čop	16,954	Hnl.hr
117	31 Aug 2025	HNL	Poljud	2–2	Pukštas (2)	Menalo, Bogojević	29,112	Hnl.hr
118	22 Nov 2025	HNL	Rujevica	5–0		Fruk (3), Vignato, Menalo	6,554	Hnl.hr
119	22 Feb 2026	HNL	Poljud	1–0	Livaja		23,542	Hnl.hr
120	4 Mar 2026	Cup (QF)	Rujevica	3–2	Pukštas, R. Brajković	Dantas, Fruk, Rukavina	7,355	Hns.hr
121	26 Apr 2026	HNL	Rujevica	0–0			7,665	Hnl.hr
122	20 Sep 2026	HNL	Rujevica	3–0		Dantas, Vignato, Adu-Adjei	7,848	Hnl.hr

Note: Home team's score always shown first

== Top scorers ==
Updated up to the last derby played on 4 March 2026.

=== Hajduk Split ===
10 goals

- (Croatia) Mijo Caktaš

9 goals

- (Croatia) Marko Livaja

7 goals

- (Croatia) Zvonko Bego
- (Croatia) Zvonimir Deranja

6 goals

- (Croatia) Ivica Hlevnjak
- (Croatia) Pero Nadoveza
- (Croatia) Zlatko Vujović

5 goals

- (Croatia) Ivan Gudelj
- (United States) Rokas Pukštas

4 goals

- (Croatia) Andrija Anković
- (Croatia) Jurica Jerković
- (Bosnia and Herzegovina) Džemaludin Mušović
- (Croatia) Goran Vučević
- (Croatia) Jurica Vučko
- (Croatia) Ante Vukušić
- (Croatia) Slaviša Žungul

=== Rijeka ===
8 goals

- (Croatia) Toni Fruk

7 goals

- (Croatia) Anas Sharbini

5 goals

- (Croatia) Antonio Čolak
- (Switzerland) Josip Drmić
- (Bosnia and Herzegovina) Admir Hasančić
- (Croatia) Mladen Mladenović
- (Croatia) Davor Vugrinec

4 goals

- (Croatia) Leon Benko
- (Slovenia) Roman Bezjak
- (Bosnia and Herzegovina) Boško Bursać
- (Croatia) Janko Janković
- (Croatia) Andrej Kramarić
- (Croatia) Vladimir Lukarić

=== Players who have scored for both clubs in the derby ===
- Filip Bradarić (2 goals, 1 for Hajduk and 1 for Rijeka)
- Josip Elez (3 goals, 1 for Hajduk and 2 for Rijeka)
- Tomislav Erceg (5 goals, 3 for Hajduk and 2 for Rijeka)
- Nenad Gračan (2 goals, 1 for Hajduk and 1 for Rijeka)
- Željko Mijač (3 goals, 2 for Hajduk and 1 for Rijeka)
- Igor Musa (3 goals, 2 for Hajduk and 1 for Rijeka)

== Players who have played for both clubs (senior career) ==
- Franko Andrijašević
- Boško Anić
- Leonard Bisaku
- Ivan Bošnjak
- Filip Bradarić
- Elvis Brajković
- Josip Bulat
- Nino Bule
- Marijan Buljat
- Boško Bursać
- Vedran Celiščak
- Sebastjan Cimirotič
- Duje Čop
- Nikica Cukrov
- Vladimir Ćutuk
- Mate Dragičević
- Josip Elez
- Tomislav Erceg
- Drago Gabrić
- Tonči Gabrić
- Marin Galić
- Nenad Gračan
- Janko Janković
- Igor Jelavić
- Ive Jerolimov
- Dario Jertec
- Petar Krpan
- Mišo Krstičević
- Rúben Lima
- Siniša Linić
- Vedran Madžar
- Filip Marčić
- Ivica Matković
- Jozo Matošić
- Mario Meštrović
- Željko Mijač
- Darko Miladin
- Mladen Mladenović
- Jasmin Mujdža
- Igor Musa
- Mato Neretljak
- Zlatko Papec
- Saša Peršon
- Berislav Poldrugovac
- Josip Posavec
- Natko Rački
- Josip Radošević
- Krunoslav Rendulić
- Ivan Rodić
- Goran Rubil
- Sead Seferović
- Ahmad Sharbini
- Anas Sharbini
- Stjepan Skočibušić
- Zoran Slavica
- Lorenco Šimić
- Marin Tomasov
- Robert Vladislavić
- Luka Vučko
- Kazimir Vulić
- Danijel Vušković
- Miroslav Weiss

== Managers who have worked at both clubs ==
- Ljubo Benčić
- Miroslav Blažević
- Luka Bonačić
- Nenad Gračan
- Luka Kaliterna
- Ivan Katalinić
- Jozo Matošić
- Josip Skoblar
- Zoran Vulić

== Yugoslav First League results ==
The tables list the place each team took in each of the seasons they played together in the top division.

	46–47	58–59	59–60	60–61	61–62	62–63	63–64	64–65	65–66	66–67	67–68	68–69	74–75	75–76	76–77
No. of teams	14	12	12	12	12	14	14	15	16	16	16	18	18	18	18
Hajduk Split	4	7	5	3	5	11	10	12	13	7	4	6	1	2	8
Rijeka	9	8	8	7	8	10	9	4	4	11	16	17	14	11	5

	77–78	78–79	79–80	80–81	81–82	82–83	83–84	84–85	85–86	86–87	87–88	88–89	89–90	90–91
No. of teams	18	18	18	18	18	18	18	18	18	18	18	18	18	19
Hajduk Split	3	1	5	2	3	2	5	2	4	8	13	3	3	6
Rijeka	5	10	10	7	12	15	4	8	5	4	8	10	6	15

== HNL results ==
The tables list the place each team took in each of the seasons.

	1992	92–93	93–94	94–95	95–96	96–97	97–98	98–99	99–00	00–01	01–02	02–03	03–04	04–05	05–06	06–07	07–08
No. of teams	12	16	18	16	12	16	12	12	12	12	16	12	12	12	12	12	12
Hajduk Split	1	2	1	1	2	2	2	3	2	1	2	2	1	1	5	2	5
Rijeka	6	4	6	11	9	4	7	2	4	10	5	9	3	4	2	7	4

	08–09	09–10	10–11	11–12	12–13	13–14	14–15	15–16	16–17	17–18	18–19	19–20	20–21	21–22	22–23	23–24	24–25	25-26
No. of teams	12	16	16	16	12	10	10	10	10	10	10	10	10	10	10	10	10	10
Hajduk Split	2	2	2	2	4	3	3	3	3	3	4	5	4	2	2	3	3	2
Rijeka	3	9	9	12	3	2	2	2	1	2	2	3	3	4	4	2	1	4

== See also ==
- Eternal derby
- Dinamo–Rijeka derby
