= 2002–03 Croatian Football Cup =

Tournament details
- Country: Croatia
- Teams: 48

Final positions
- Champions: Hajduk Split (4th title)
- Runners-up: Uljanik Pula

Tournament statistics
- Matches played: 54
- Goals scored: 200 (3.7 per match)
- Top goal scorer: Igor Žiković (7)

The 2002–03 Croatian Football Cup was the twelfth edition of Croatia's football knockout competition. Dinamo Zagreb were the defending champions, and the cup was won by Hajduk Split.

== Calendar ==
Round	Main date	Number of fixtures	Clubs	New entries this round
Preliminary round	26–31 August 2002	16	48 → 32	none
First round	11 September 2002	16	32 → 16	16
Second round	6 November – 4 December 2002	8	16 → 8	none
Quarter-finals	5 and 19 March 2003	8	8 → 4	none
Semi-finals	16 and 23 April 2003	4	4 → 2	none
Final	21 May and 4 June 2003	2	2 → 1	none

== Preliminary round ==
Tie no	Home team	Score	Away team
1	Auto Mikolaj	2–13	Pomorac
2	Istra Pula	2–1	Metalac Osijek
3	Bedem Ivankovo	1–3	Novalja
4	Polet Martin na Muri	0–2	Omladinac Sloga
5	Oriolik	6–0	Omladinac Jurketinci
6	TŠK Topolovac	3–2	Podravac
7	Sava Strmec	0–2	Pag
8	Pitomača	0–3	Grafičar Vodovod
9	Uljanik Pula	11–1	Ivančica
10	Virovitica	5–0	Mladost Ždralovi
11	Vodice	0–4	Uskok Klis
12	Kamen Ingrad	1–0	Marsonia
13	Graničar Županja	1–0	Sloga Maris Jazavica
14	Dugo Selo	1–0	Bjelovar
15	Oroslavlje	1–3	Croatia Sesvete
16	Hajduk Vela Luka	3–0	Ilovac Karlovac

== First round ==
Tie no	Home team	Score	Away team
1	Orijent	0–2	Kamen Ingrad
2	Grafičar Vodovod	1–0	Rijeka
3	Istra Pula	2–3	Pomorac
4	Hajduk Vela Luka	0–6	Dinamo Zagreb
5	Pag	2–7	Hajduk Split
6	Oriolik	0–9	Osijek
7	Virovitica	1–6	Varteks
8	Omladinac Sloga	2–6	NK Zagreb
9	Graničar Županja	0–3	Cibalia
10	Uskok Klis	0–2	Slaven Belupo
11	Uljanik Pula	2–1	Hrvatski Dragovoljac
12	Dugo Selo	1–2 (aet)	Zadar
13	Novalja	1–2	Šibenik
14	Dubrovnik	0–2	Belišće
15	Croatia Sesvete	0–3	Inker Zaprešić
16	TŠK Topolovac	1–0 (aet)	Segesta

== Second round ==
Tie no	Home team	Score	Away team
1	Hajduk Split	1–0	TŠK Topolovac
2	Pomorac	1–0	Slaven Belupo
3	Cibalia	1–0	Zadar
4	Osijek	3–1	Inker Zaprešić
5	Uljanik Pula	6–0	Grafičar Vodovod
6	Šibenik	1–2 (aet)	NK Zagreb
7	Belišće	0–4	Varteks
8	Kamen Ingrad	2–1 (aet)	Dinamo Zagreb

== Quarter-finals ==
Team 1	Agg.	Team 2	1st leg	2nd leg
Cibalia	1–7	Hajduk Split	1–3	0–4
Osijek	1–4	Uljanik Pula	0–0	1–4
Kamen Ingrad	4–2	NK Zagreb	1–1	3–1
Varteks	4–3	Pomorac	3–2	1–1

== Semi-finals ==
16 April 2003
16:00

Uljanik Pula	1–1	Kamen Ingrad
Žiković 70'	Report	Popović 59'

Stadion Aldo Drosina, Pula
Attendance: 3,000
Referee: Vlado Svilokos (Sisak)
23 April 2003
18:30

Kamen Ingrad	0–4	Uljanik Pula
	Report	Žiković 26', 65'; Ostović 76'; Raković 88'

Stadion Kamen Ingrad, Velika
Attendance: 2,500
Referee: Nikola Petir (Kašina)

Uljanik Pula won 5–1 on aggregate.

16 April 2003
17:30

Hajduk Split	2–0	Varteks
Vejić 70'; Miladin 90+3'	Report

Stadion Poljud, Split
Attendance: 8,000
Referee: Draženko Kovačić (Križevci)
23 April 2003
17:30

Varteks	0–0	Hajduk Split
	Report

Stadion Varteks, Varaždin
Attendance: 4,000
Referee: Ivan Bebek (Rijeka)

Hajduk Split won 2–0 on aggregate.

== Final ==
=== First leg ===
21 May 2003
17:00

Uljanik Pula	0–1	Hajduk Split
	Report (in Croatian)	Bule 49'

Stadion Aldo Drosina, Pula
Attendance: 5,000
Referee: Željko Širić (Osijek)

=== Second leg ===
4 June 2003
17:45

Hajduk Split	4–0	Uljanik Pula
Pletikosa 19' (pen.); Rapaić 27'; Turković 36'; Deranja 82'	Report (in Croatian)

Stadion Poljud, Split
Attendance: 12,000
Referee: Goran Marić (Zagreb)

Hajduk Split won 5–0 on aggregate.

== See also ==
- 2002–03 Croatian First Football League
- 2002–03 Croatian Second Football League
