= Nikica Jelavić =

Croatian footballer (born 1985)

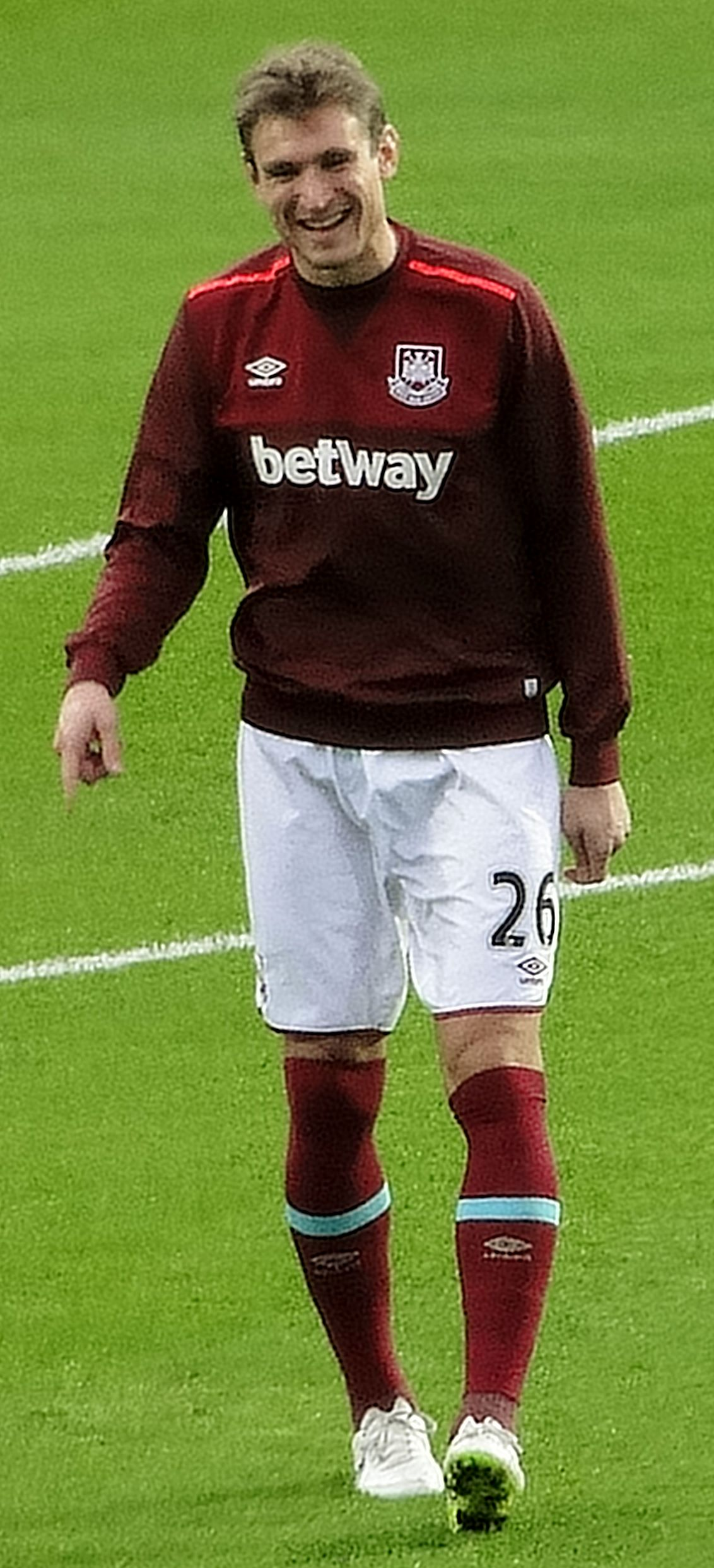
- Jelavić with West Ham United in 2015

Personal information
- Full name: Nikica Jelavić
- Date of birth: 27 August 1985 (age 41)
- Place of birth: Čapljina, SR Bosnia and Herzegovina, Yugoslavia
- Height: 1.87 m (6 ft 2 in)
- Position: Forward

Team information
- Current team: Lokomotiva (manager)

Youth career
- 1999–2001: GOŠK Gabela
- 2001–2002: Neretva

Senior career*
Years	Team	Apps	(Gls)
2002–2007	Hajduk Split	34	(8)
2007–2008	Zulte Waregem	23	(3)
2008–2010	Rapid Wien	71	(27)
2010–2012	Rangers	45	(30)
2012–2014	Everton	59	(16)
2014–2015	Hull City	46	(13)
2015–2016	West Ham United	13	(1)
2016–2017	Beijing Renhe	29	(15)
2017	→ Guizhou Zhicheng (loan)	26	(15)
2018–2020	Guizhou Zhicheng	31	(12)
2020–2021	Lokomotiva	4	(0)
Total		381	(160)

International career
2002	Croatia U17	2	(0)
2003	Croatia U18	2	(0)
2009–2014	Croatia	36	(6)

Managerial career
- 2025–: Lokomotiva
- * Club domestic league appearances and goals

Nikica Jelavić (Croatian pronunciation: [nîkitsa jělaʋitɕ]; born 27 August 1985) is a Croatian football manager and former professional player who played as a forward. He is the manager of Croatian Football League club Lokomotiva.

Jelavić began his career with Croatian side Hajduk Split of the Prva HNL in 2002, before moving to Belgian Pro League club Zulte Waregem in 2007. A year later, he moved to Austrian Bundesliga club Rapid Wien. In 2010, he was signed by Rangers, with whom he won the Scottish Premier League and the Scottish League Cup in his first season. He moved to England with Everton in January 2012, and Hull City two years later.

Jelavić is a former Croatian international, debuting in 2009 and retiring in 2014. He represented the country at UEFA Euro 2012 and the 2014 FIFA World Cup.

== Club career ==
=== Early career ===
Jelavić was born in Čapljina, SR Bosnia and Herzegovina, SFR Yugoslavia and started his youth career at his local side GOŠK Gabela, which plays in the Bosnian league system. His career took a more serious turn when he moved to the nearby cross-border club in Croatia, NK Neretva from the town of Metković, managed by Branko Gutić.

=== Hajduk Split ===
At the encouragement of Ante Prco, Ivan Gudelj, Dražen Mužinić and Vilson Džoni, Jelavić was brought to Hajduk Split's junior side at the age of 15. He played his first match for Hajduk's senior side in the Prva HNL at the age of 17. During his time at Hajduk, he suffered a lot of injuries which prevented him to make more appearances for the squad. After he recovered from the injuries, he became a first team regular in the 2006–07 Prva HNL season. Despite him playing the whole season, he only managed five league goals and was transfer listed at the end of the season.

=== Zulte Waregem ===
In July 2007, Jelavić signed for Belgian First Division club Zulte Waregem. During his one season at the club, he scored three goals in 23 appearances.

=== Rapid Wien ===
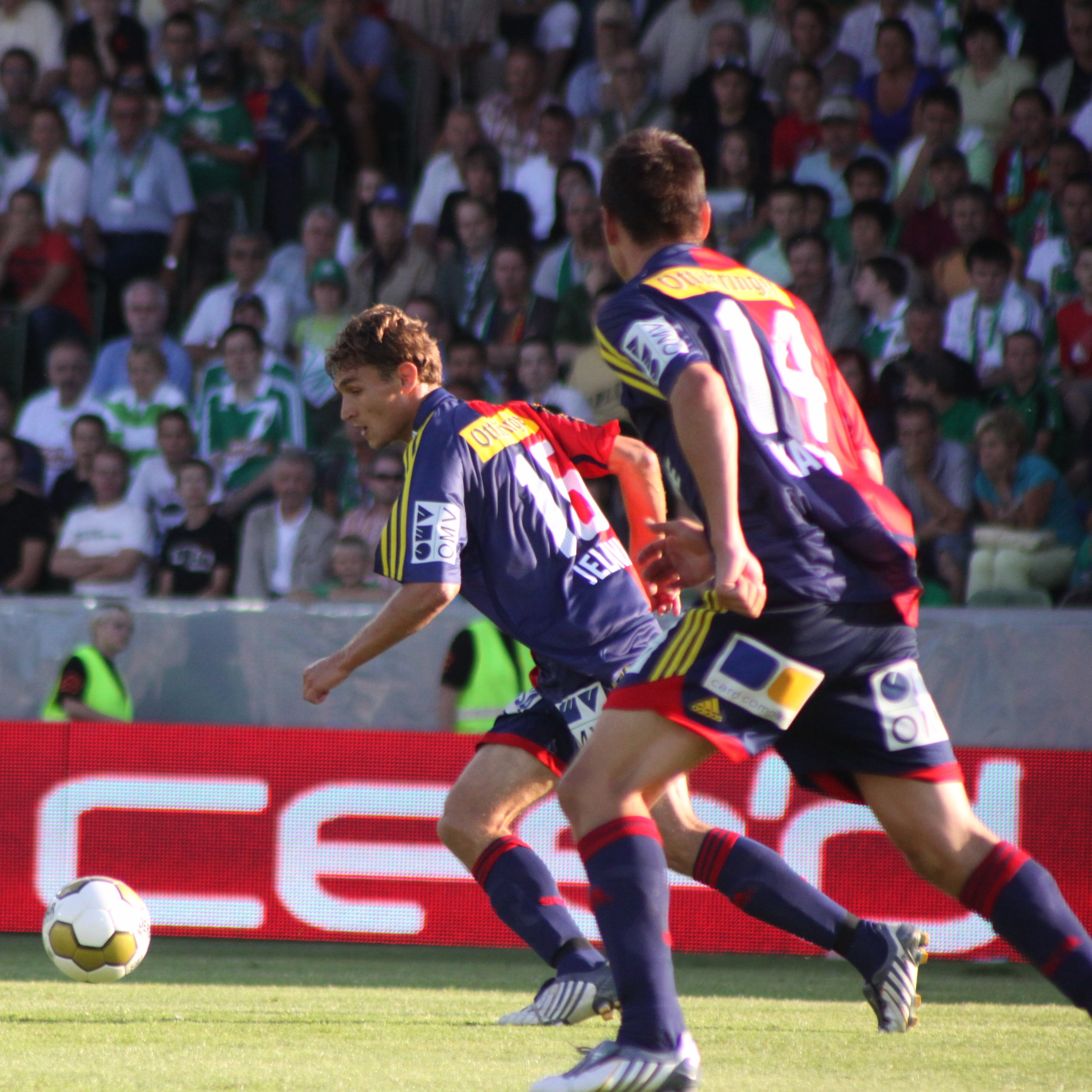
Jelavić playing for Rapid Wien in 2009

In July 2008, Jelavić joined the Austrian champions Rapid Wien. In the 2008–09 Austrian Football Bundesliga season, he played 24 games (as first squad in nine and as substitute in 15) and scored seven goals without any yellow or red cards. In 2009–10, he played in 33 games (as first squad in 31 and as substitute in two) and scored 18 goals with five yellow cards and one red card. In the Europa League, he played six games and scored four goals with one assist.

In the summer of 2010, Jelavić was linked with a transfer to Rangers. A fee was originally agreed between the two clubs on 26 July, but the transfer was delayed by a dispute between the player and Rapid Wien over a payment Jelavić claimed the club owed him. On 19 August, Rapid announced that Jelavić would be signing for Rangers, after the player announced he would not play in Rapid's Europa League qualifying match against Aston Villa.

=== Rangers ===
On 20 August 2010, Jelavić completed a £4 million move to Rangers on a four-year deal. He made his debut in a home match against St Johnstone on 28 August 2010. Due to his former club Rapid Wien qualifying for the UEFA Europa League, Jelavić was ineligible to participate in Rangers' Champions League campaign, after becoming cup tied after appearing for the Austrian side in the earlier rounds.

On 11 September, Jelavić scored his first Rangers goal against Hamilton Academical at New Douglas Park after he headed in a Kyle Lafferty cross. On 21 September, Jelavić played against Dunfermline Athletic in the League Cup, scoring two goals in the game including an overhead kick in a 7–2 win for Rangers. In Rangers next away match to Aberdeen at Pittodrie, Jelavić scored what the winning goal in a 3–2 Rangers win. Rangers were 2–0 down before coming back to win the match with Jelavić scoring the third Rangers goal. The next week Jelavić was injured in a match against Hearts at Tynecastle, suffering ankle ligament damage due to a tackle by Hearts midfielder Ian Black. Jelavić claimed that Black had intended to injure him, a charge denied by his opponent, who apologized for the challenge. He scored two goals in a match against Dundee United in October 2011.

After making his comeback off of the bench, Jelavić started his first match since his injury on 26 January 2011, scoring away from home against Hibernian in the first half. Jelavić's first hat-trick for Rangers came in a 6–0 win over Motherwell on 12 February 2011 at Ibrox Stadium. In Rangers' 4–0 victory against St Johnstone on 27 February 2011, Jelavić scored two goals and assisted a third with a backheel pass. On 20 March 2011, Jelavić scored the winning goal in extra time in Rangers' 2–1 win over Celtic in the 2011 Scottish League Cup Final. He then scored in consecutive away 1–0 victories over Hamilton Academical and Aberdeen. Jelavić rounded off the season by scoring five goals in the last six matches of the season including a goal and two assists in Rangers' 5–1 title winning victory against Kilmarnock on the last matchday of the season. Jelavić received the SFA goal of the season award for his goal against Aberdeen. Jelavić ended the 2010–11 season with the best goals to game ratio in Scotland after scoring 19 goals in just 27 starts, better than any other striker in Scotland.

On 22 July 2011, a day before Rangers opening match of the season against Hearts, it was announced that Jelavić would wear the number 9 shirt for the 2011–12 season, switching from number 18. On 30 August 2011, it was reported that Rangers had rejected a £6.5 million bid from Championship club Leicester City for Jelavić. Jelavić scored his first European goal for Rangers on 3 August 2011 in a 1–1 draw against Malmö FF in a UEFA Champions League qualifying game. On 5 November 2011 Jelavić scored his first brace of the season helping Rangers to a 3–1 victory over Dundee United. Jelavić scored another two goals in a 2–0 win over Hibernian on 10 December 2011. His third brace of the season came on 14 January 2012 in a 2–1 win over St Johnstone. Jelavić left Rangers having scored a total of 36 goals in a total of 55 appearances in all competitions.

=== Everton ===
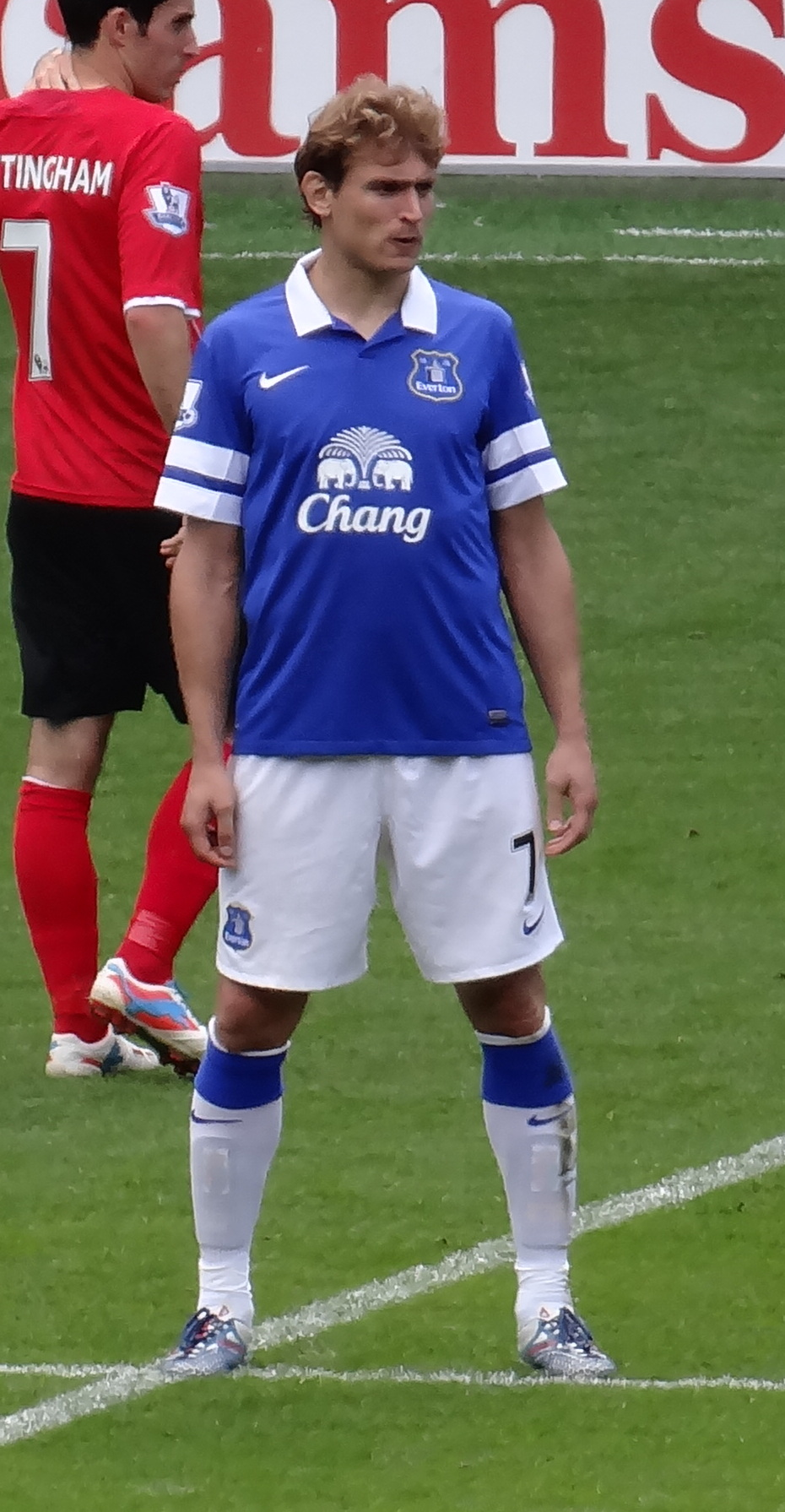
Jelavić playing for Everton in 2013

On 31 January 2012, Jelavić signed a four-and-a-half-year contract with Everton for a fee of £5 million. He made his debut a few days later, as a second-half substitute for Denis Stracqualursi, in a 1–1 draw against Wigan Athletic at the DW Stadium. On 10 March 2012, Jelavić scored his first goal for Everton in his first start for the club, scoring the only goal of the game in a 1–0 victory against Tottenham Hotspur at Goodison Park. His first FA Cup goal was the opener in a 2–0 win against Sunderland in a quarter-final replay at the Stadium of Light. Jelavić scored his first brace for Everton, a 2‐2 away draw against Norwich City in the league, and the following week he scored the opening goal in a 2–1 defeat by neighbours Liverpool, in the FA Cup semi-final at Wembley Stadium.

Jelavić scored twice in a 4–4 draw against Manchester United at Old Trafford, becoming the first Everton player to score in five successive away games since Duncan McKenzie in 1977–78. In scoring twice against Fulham he became the quickest player to reach ten goals at Everton since Tom Browell in 1912. Jelavić was named the Premier League Player of the Month for April 2012, the first Croatian to achieve this. Jelavić scored his 11th goal for Everton against Newcastle United on the final day of the season and finished the season as Everton's top scorer both in the league and overall.

Jelavić started the 2012–13 season with goals against Aston Villa, Southampton, Wigan, Sunderland, Tottenham and Cheltenham Town, but his form declined and Victor Anichebe was used as Everton's main striker for the second half of the season. In 2013–14 the loan signing Romelu Lukaku was preferred to Jelavić, who did not register a goal until January when he scored twice against Queens Park Rangers in the FA Cup third round. Though Everton manager Roberto Martínez was reluctant to sell the Croatian, Jelavić sought a move to Hull City in order to try and play more first team football ahead of the World Cup. Less than a week later Everton accepted a transfer bid from Hull.

=== Hull City ===
On 15 January 2014, Jelavić signed for Hull for an undisclosed fee on a three-and-a-half-year deal. He made his debut for Hull away against Norwich City on 18 January 2014, which Hull lost 1–0. He scored his first goal for Hull in a 2–0 win away at Sunderland on 8 February 2014. His second and third goals both came in Hull's 4–0 away win at Cardiff City on 22 February 2014. He scored his fourth and final goal of the season in the 2–2 draw away to Fulham on 26 April 2014. He finished his first season at Hull with four goals from 16 Premier League appearances, but both he and strike partner Shane Long were cup-tied for the team's run to the 2014 FA Cup Final.

In Hull's maiden European season Jelavić returned from Croatia's 2014 World Cup campaign early due to the sale of his strike partner Shane Long. He came on as a substitute in three of Hull's four Europa League matches, playing once against AS Trenčín and twice against Lokeren. In the Premier League, Jelavić got off to a very bright start, starting in Hull's first five matches while scoring three goals, with the goals coming in the 1–1 draw with Stoke City, the 2–1 defeat against Aston Villa and the 2–2 draw against Newcastle.

=== West Ham United ===
On 1 September 2015, Jelavić signed a two-year contract with West Ham United with an option for a further two years. He made his West Ham debut on 19 September, coming on as a 69th-minute substitute for Manuel Lanzini in a 2–1 away win against Manchester City. He scored his first goal for the club in an FA Cup tie against Wolverhampton Wanderers on 9 January 2016.

=== Beijing Renhe ===
On 15 February 2016, Jelavić transferred to China League One side Beijing Renhe.

=== Guizhou Zhicheng ===
In February 2017, Jelavić loaned to Guizhou Zhicheng on a one-year loan deal. He made a permanent transfer to Guizhou Zhicheng on 4 December 2017.

=== Lokomotiva ===
On 31 August 2020, Jelavić joined Lokomotiva. On 1 March 2021, Lokomotiva coach Jerko Leko revealed that Jelavić and teammate Sammir decided to end their professional careers, and that the club respected their decisions.

== International career ==
In 2007, Jelavić was called up to the Croatia squad for the UEFA Euro 2008 qualifiers, although he did not feature in any of the qualifying matches for the competition. Jelavić eventually made his full international debut in a friendly match against Qatar on 8 October 2009 in Rijeka, coming on as a substitute for Ivan Klasnić in the 64th minute in which he also scored his first international goal to secure his team a 3–2 win in the final moments of the match. On 14 October 2009, he made his first competitive international appearance for Croatia, in the team's final 2010 FIFA World Cup qualifier against Kazakhstan in Astana, again coming on as a substitute for Klasnić, in the 77th minute.

In 2010, he made five international appearances, scoring the equaliser in a 1–1 friendly match against Slovakia in Bratislava.

Jelavić was selected for Croatia's Euro 2012 squad. He scored his first competitive international goal and his country's second in their first group stage match against Republic of Ireland resulting in a 3–1 win. He also featured in Croatia's group stage matches against Italy and Spain but did not score and Croatia was eliminated after the group stage.

Jelavić featured in Croatia's first qualifying match for the 2014 World Cup in Brazil against Macedonia, scoring the only goal in a 1–0 win. He scored later in a friendly match against South Korea at Craven Cottage in early February 2013.

In the opening match of the 2014 World Cup, on 12 June against the hosts Brazil in São Paulo, he mishit a cross from Ivica Olić which was deflected by opponent Marcelo for the first goal of the tournament. Croatia eventually lost 3–1.

On 11 October 2014, dissatisfied with the status he had within the national team, Jelavić announced his retirement from international football.

== Personal life ==
Jelavić is married to Dajana Jelavić, whom he had started dating when he was 17 years old. Together they have two daughters.

== Career statistics ==
=== Club ===
Appearances and goals by club, season and competition
Club	Season	League			National cup		League cup		Continental		Total	
Club	Season	Division	Apps	Goals	Apps	Goals	Apps	Goals	Apps	Goals	Apps	Goals
Hajduk Split	2002–03	Prva HNL	1	0	1	0	—		0	0	2	0
Hajduk Split	2003–04	Prva HNL	2	0	0	0	—		0	0	2	0
Hajduk Split	2004–05	Prva HNL	0	0	0	0	—		0	0	0	0
Hajduk Split	2005–06	Prva HNL	9	3	2	0	—		0	0	11	3
Hajduk Split	2006–07	Prva HNL	22	5	4	2	—		—		26	7
Hajduk Split	Total		34	8	7	2	—		0	0	41	10
Zulte Waregem	2007–08	Belgian First Division	23	3	2	1	—		—		25	4
Rapid Wien	2008–09	Austrian Bundesliga	34	7	3	1	—		2	0	39	8
Rapid Wien	2009–10	Austrian Bundesliga	33	18	3	2	—		12	9	48	29
Rapid Wien	2010–11	Austrian Bundesliga	4	2	0	0	—		4	4	8	6
Rapid Wien	Total		71	27	6	3	—		18	13	95	43
Rangers	2010–11	Scottish Premier League	23	16	1	0	3	3	1	0	28	19
Rangers	2011–12	Scottish Premier League	22	14	1	1	1	1	4	1	28	17
Rangers	Total		45	30	2	1	4	4	5	1	56	36
Everton	2011–12	Premier League	13	9	3	2	0	0	—		16	11
Everton	2012–13	Premier League	37	7	5	1	1	0	—		43	8
Everton	2013–14	Premier League	9	0	1	2	0	0	—		10	2
Everton	Total		59	16	9	5	1	0	—		69	21
Hull City	2013–14	Premier League	16	4	0	0	0	0	—		16	4
Hull City	2014–15	Premier League	26	8	0	0	0	0	3	0	29	8
Hull City	2015–16	Championship	4	1	0	0	1	0	—		5	1
Hull City	Total		46	13	0	0	1	0	3	0	50	13
West Ham United	2015–16	Premier League	13	1	2	1	0	0	—		15	2
Beijing Renhe	2016	China League One	29	15	0	0	—		—		29	15
Guizhou Zhicheng (loan)	2017	Chinese Super League	26	15	0	0	—		—		26	15
Guizhou Zhicheng	2018	Chinese Super League	18	5	2	0	—		—		20	5
Guizhou Zhicheng	2019	China League One	13	7	0	0	—		—		13	7
Guizhou Zhicheng	Total		31	12	2	0	—		—		33	12
Lokomotiva	2020–21	Prva HNL	4	0	1	0	—		0	0	5	0
Career total			381	160	31	13	6	4	26	14	444	171

=== International ===
Appearances and goals by national team and year
National team	Year	Apps	Goals
Croatia	2009	3	1
Croatia	2010	5	1
Croatia	2011	9	0
Croatia	2012	8	2
Croatia	2013	5	1
Croatia	2014	6	1
Total		36	6

Scores and results list Croatia's goal tally first, score column indicates score after each Jelavić goal.

List of international goals scored by Nikica Jelavić
No.	Date	Venue	Opponent	Score	Result	Competition	Ref.
1	8 October 2009	Kantrida Stadium, Rijeka, Croatia	Qatar	3-2	3-2	Friendly	
2	11 August 2010	Štadión Pasienky, Bratislava, Slovakia	Slovakia	1-1	1-1	Friendly	
3	10 June 2012	Poznań Stadium, Poznań, Poland	Republic of Ireland	2-1	3-1	UEFA Euro 2012	
4	7 September 2012	Maksimir Stadium, Zagreb, Croatia	North Macedonia	1-0	1-0	2014 FIFA World Cup qualification	
5	6 February 2013	Craven Cottage, London, United Kingdom	South Korea	3-0	4-0	Friendly	
6	6 June 2014	Estádio Governador Roberto Santos, Salvador, Brazil	Australia	1-0	1-0	Friendly	

== Honours ==
Hajduk Split

- Prva HNL: 2003–04
- Croatian Cup: 2002–03

Rangers

- Scottish Premier League: 2010–11
- Scottish League Cup: 2010–11

Individual

- Premier League Player of the Month: April 2012
