= Dalibor Pauletić =

Croatian footballer (born 1978)

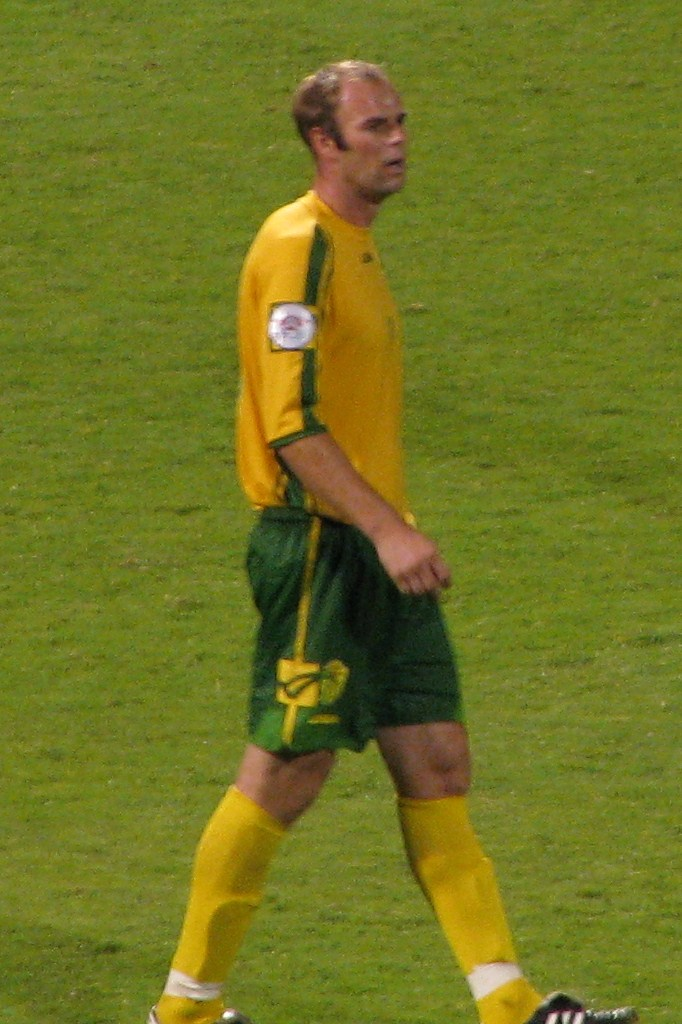

Personal information
- Date of birth: 27 October 1978 (age 48)
- Place of birth: Pula, Croatia
- Height: 1.87 m (6 ft 1 1/2 in)
- Position: Defender

Youth career
- 1986–1995: Pazinka

Senior career*
Years	Team	Apps	(Gls)
1994–1998	Pazinka	120	(3)
1999–2001	Rijeka	20	(2)
2001–2003	Uljanik	60	(2)
2003–2005	Istra 1961	90	(3)
2005–2006	KR Reykjavík	21	(1)
2007–2011	Istra 1961	107	(4)
2011–	Vrsar		
- * Club domestic league appearances and goals as of 3 December 2017

Dalibor Pauletić (born 27 October 1978) is a Croatian football defender, who most notably played for Prva HNL side NK Istra 1961, where he was a captain.

== Career ==
Pauletić had a spell in Iceland with KR Reykjavík.

== Honours ==
Istra 1961

- Druga HNL - South: 2002-03
- Druga HNL: 2008-09
