= Zlatko Runje =

Croatian footballer (born 1979)

Personal information
- Date of birth: 9 December 1979 (age 46)
- Place of birth: Sinj, SR Croatia, Yugoslavia
- Height: 1.93 m (6 ft 4 in)
- Position: Goalkeeper

Team information
- Current team: Persib Bandung (assistant coach)

Senior career*
| Years | Team | Apps | (Gls) |
| 2001–2004 | Hajduk Split | 8 | (0) |
| 2004–2006 | AA Gent | 2 | (0) |
| 2006–2007 | Hajduk Split | 0 | (0) |
| 2007 | Varteks Varaždin | 5 | (0) |
| 2007–2008 | Šibenik | 13 | (0) |
| 2008–2010 | Panthrakikos | 4 | (0) |
| 2010–2013 | Junak Sinj | 53 | (0) |
| 2013–2014 | Solin | 6 | (0) |
| 2014 | Konavljanin | | |
| 2014 | Hrvace | | |

Managerial career
- 2021: Hajduk Split (goalkeeping coach)
- 2022–2024: Wadi Degla (goalkeeping coach)
- 2024–2025: FC Sheriff (goalkeeping coach)
- 2025–2026: FC Ballkani (assistant coach)
- 2026–: Persib Bandung (assistant coach)
- * Club domestic league appearances and goals as of 7 July 2026

Zlatko Runje (born 9 December 1979) is a Croatian retired footballer who played as a goalkeeper. He is currently the assistant coach of BRI Super League side Persib Bandung.

== Personal life ==
He is the younger brother of Vedran Runje, also the former professional football goalkeeper.
