= Danijel Radiček =

Croatian footballer

Personal information
- Full name: Danijel Radiček
- Date of birth: 9 July 1980 (age 46)
- Place of birth: Koprivnica, SFR Yugoslavia
- Height: 1.77 m (5 ft 10 in)
- Position: Midfielder

Senior career*
| Years | Team | Apps | (Gls) |
| 2004–2005 | Slaven Belupo | 0 | (0) |
| 2005–2006 | Koprivnica | 23 | (1) |
| 2006–2009 | Slaven Belupo | 5 | (0) |
| 2009 | Varteks | 6 | (0) |
| 2010-2012 | Kalinovac | | |
| 2013 | Mladost Mali Otok | | |
| 2013-2014 | SV Grosspetersdorf | 33 | (0) |
| 2014 | Mladost Klostar Podravski | | |
- * Club domestic league appearances and goals as of 19 May 2007

Danijel Radiček (born 9 July 1980) is a Croatian retired football midfielder.

== Career ==
He had a spell in Austria, with fifth-tier SV Großpetersdorf.
