= Igor Novaković (footballer) =

Croatian footballer

Personal information
- Full name: Igor Novaković
- Date of birth: 24 May 1979 (age 47)
- Place of birth: Karlovac, SFR Yugoslavia
- Height: 1.80 m (5 ft 11 in)
- Positions: Winger; striker

Youth career
- Karlovac

Senior career*
Years	Team	Apps	(Gls)
1996–2000	Karlovac	13	
2000–2002	Hrvatski Dragovoljac	23	(1)
2001	→ Croatia Sesvete (loan)		
2002–2003	Zagreb	10	(1)
2004–2006	Rijeka	70	(16)
2006–2008	Tom Tomsk	5	(0)
2007	→ Rijeka (loan)	8	(2)
2008–2009	Rijeka	26	(0)
2009–2010	Al-Arabi		
2010	Koper	7	(0)
2011	Elin Weiz	13	(2)
2011–2013	Karlovac	13	(1)
- * Club domestic league appearances and goals

Igor Novaković (born 24 May 1979) is a Croatian retired football midfielder.

== Club career ==
He had a short spell with Austrian third tier side Elin Weiz.

== Honours ==
Rijeka

- Croatian Cup: 2005, 2006
