= Vincenzo Zadel =

Croatian footballer

Personal information
- Full name: Vincenzo Zadel
- Date of birth: 7 February 1937 (age 89)
- Place of birth: Fiume, Kingdom of Italy
- Position: Midfielder

Senior career*
Years	Team	Apps	(Gls)
1956–1964	Rijeka		(22)
1964–1966	Sloboda Tuzla		(41)
1966–1971	Altınordu	104	(9)
- * Club domestic league appearances and goals

Vincenzo Zadel (also known as Enzo Zadel or Vinko Zadel) is a Croatia-born Yugoslav retired football player.

== Career ==
Born in Rijeka, as a player he spent eight seasons with his hometown club, HNK Rijeka, where he was the club's top scorer for two seasons. He then moved on to FK Sloboda Tuzla, where he played for two seasons, scoring 41 goals. In 1966 he moved to Turkey and later to Switzerland where he finished his career at age 39.

== Honours ==
NK Rijeka

- Yugoslav Second League: 1957-58
