= Darko Miladin =

Croatian footballer

Personal information
- Full name: Darko Miladin
- Date of birth: 1 April 1979 (age 47)
- Place of birth: Dubrovnik, SR Croatia, SFR Yugoslavia
- Height: 1.79 m (5 ft 10 in)
- Position: Defender

Youth career
- HNK Dubrovnik
- –1998: Hajduk Split

Senior career*
Years	Team	Apps	(Gls)
1998–2004	Hajduk Split	126	(5)
2005	Schaffhausen	12	(0)
2005–2006	Hajduk Split	35	(0)
2007–2008	Ergotelis	30	(0)
2008–2010	Rijeka	11	(0)
Total		214	(5)

International career^{‡}
1999	Croatia	1	(0)
- * Club domestic league appearances and goals as of 3 July 2009 ‡ National team caps and goals as of 19 June 2008

Darko Miladin (born 1 April 1979 in Dubrovnik, SR Croatia, Yugoslavia) is a Croatian retired football player.

== International career ==
He made his debut for Croatia in a June 1999 Korea Cup match against the hosts, but it remained his sole international appearance.

Awards
Preceded by Josip Skoko	Heart of Hajduk Award; 1999	Succeeded by Stipe Pletikosa
