= Vedran Celiščak =

Croatian footballer

Vedran Celišćak
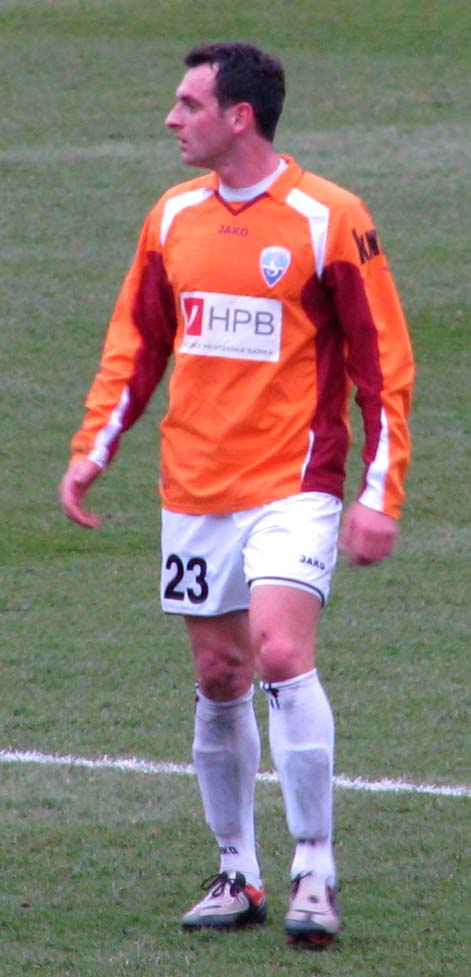

Personal information
- Date of birth: 16 July 1982 (age 44)
- Place of birth: Koprivnica, Croatia
- Height: 1.78 m (5 ft 10 in)
- Positions: Left-back; left midfielder

Youth career
- –1998: Slaven Belupo

Senior career*
Years	Team	Apps	(Gls)
1998–1999	Slaven Belupo	3	(0)
2000–2002	Hajduk Split	5	(0)
2001	→ Osijek (loan)	2	(0)
2001–2002	Rijeka	11	(0)
2002–2003	FC Moscow	2	(0)
2004	→ FC Oryol (loan)	4	(0)
2004–2005	NK Kalinovac		
2005	Posušje	12	(1)
2006–2008	Međimurje	58	(2)
2008	Dalian Haichang	5	(0)
2008–2009	Šibenik	24	(0)
2009	Croatia Sesvete	9	(2)
2010	Međimurje	13	(0)
2011–2012	Zagreb	21	(2)
2013–2014	NK Croatia Grabrovnica	14	(4)
2015	Neckarsulmer SU		
2015	TuRa Untermünkheim		
- * Club domestic league appearances and goals

Vedran Celišćak (born 16 July 1982) is a Croatian former professional footballer who played as a left-back and Left midfielder.
