= Igor Žiković =

Croatian footballer (born 1976)

Personal information
- Full name: Igor Žiković
- Date of birth: 28 December 1976 (age 49)
- Place of birth: Pula, SR Croatia
- Height: 1.94 m (6 ft 4 in)
- Position: Striker

Youth career
- Istra Pula
- Olimpija Ljubljana

Senior career*
| Years | Team | Apps | (Gls) |
| 1995–2000 | Istra Pula | 27 | (4) |
| 2001 | Tennis Borussia Berlin | 7 | (0) |
| 2002 | Olimpija Ljubljana | 3 | (0) |
| 2002–2003 | Uljanik Pula | | |
| 2004–2005 | Wacker Burghausen | 14 | (2) |
| 2005–2006 | Jadran Poreč | | |
| 2007 | Eintracht Braunschweig | 6 | (0) |
| 2007–2009 | Istra 1961 | 20 | (6) |
| 2008–2009 | → Jadran Poreč (loan) | | |
| 2009–2014 | Funtana | | |

International career
| 1994 | Croatia U-17 | 1 | (1) |
| 1994 | Croatia U-19 | 1 | (0) |
| 1996 | Croatia U-20 | 1 | (1) |
- * Club domestic league appearances and goals

Igor Žiković (born 28 December 1976 in Pula) is a retired Croatian footballer.

Žiković made a total of 20 appearances in the German 2. Fußball-Bundesliga during his playing career.
