= Hrvoje Vuković =

Croatian footballer

Personal information
- Full name: Hrvoje Vuković
- Date of birth: 25 July 1979 (age 47)
- Place of birth: Split, SFR Yugoslavia
- Height: 1.84 m (6 ft 0 in)
- Position: Defender

Team information
- Current team: Hajduk Split (Ass. Head of Youth Academy)

Youth career
- 1988–1997: Hajduk Split

Senior career*
Years	Team	Apps	(Gls)
1998–2004	Hajduk Split	158	(6)
2004–2007	Wacker Burghausen	78	(6)
2007–2009	Alemannia Aachen	19	(3)

International career
1997	Croatia U-18	1	(0)
1997-1997	Croatia U-19	5	(0)
1999	Croatia U-20	2	(0)
2001	Croatia U-21	2	(0)

Managerial career
- 2022–: Hajduk Split (Ass. Head of Youth)
- * Club domestic league appearances and goals

Hrvoje Vuković (born 25 July 1979 in Split) is a former Croatian football player who last played for Alemannia Aachen in June 2009.

== Career ==
After relegation of Wacker Burghausen to Regionalliga Nord, Vuković signed a three-year contract with Alemannia Aachen, who relegated from the Bundesliga and left the team after the end of his contract on 30 June 2009.

== Post-retirement ==
After hanging up his boots after the 2008-09 season, Vuković went back to school to study and also started getting into the music business, including organizing festivals.

On August 1, 2022, Vuković was employed as responsible for U8 to U14 at Hajduk Split's youth academy. He was appointed to the position at the same time as Goran Sablić, who was in charge of U14 to U19. When the head of the academy, Boro Primorac, was given a new role and Sablić took over his position, Vuković stayed in his position, now as Sablić's right-hand man.
