= Stipe Pletikosa =

Croatian footballer (born 1979)

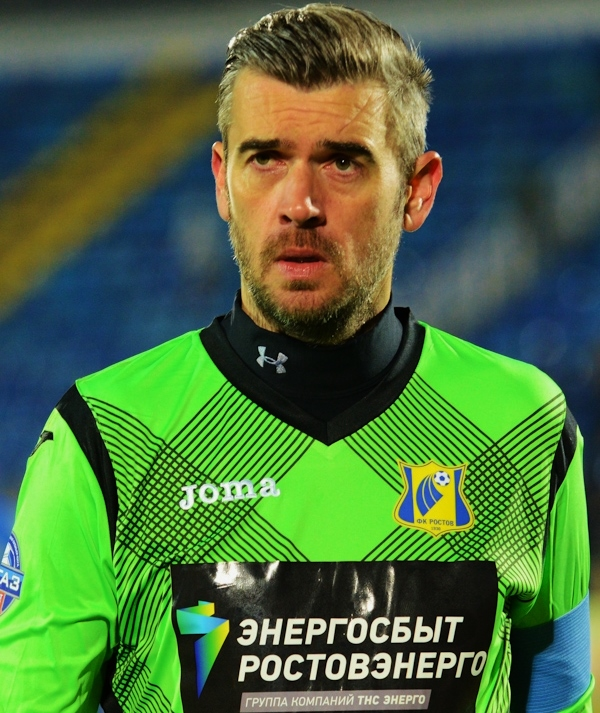
- Pletikosa with Rostov in 2015

Personal information
- Full name: Stipe Pletikosa
- Date of birth: 8 January 1979 (age 47)
- Place of birth: Split, Croatia
- Height: 1.93 m (6 ft 4 in)
- Position: Goalkeeper

Team information
- Current team: Croatia & Croatia U21 (technical director)

Youth career
- 1986–1996: Hajduk Split

Senior career*
Years	Team	Apps	(Gls)
1996–2003	Hajduk Split	141	(4)
2003–2007	Shakhtar Donetsk	32	(0)
2005–2006	→ Hajduk Split (loan)	21	(0)
2007–2011	Spartak Moscow	63	(0)
2010–2011	→ Tottenham Hotspur (loan)	0	(0)
2011–2015	Rostov	110	(0)
2015–2016	Deportivo de La Coruña	2	(0)
Total		369	(4)

International career
1994	Croatia U15	1	(0)
1994–1995	Croatia U16	2	(0)
1994	Croatia U17	2	(0)
1995–1997	Croatia U18	2	(0)
1995–1998	Croatia U19	14	(0)
1999	Croatia U20	5	(0)
1998–2001	Croatia U21	13	(0)
1999–2014	Croatia	114	(0)

Managerial career
- 2021–: Croatia (senior & U21 technical director)
- * Club domestic league appearances and goals

Stipe Pletikosa (Croatian pronunciation: [stǐːpe plětikosa]; born 8 January 1979) is a Croatian former professional footballer who played as a goalkeeper. Since 29 July 2021, he has worked at the Croatian Football Federation as the technical director for both the senior and under-21 national teams.

Pletikosa began his professional career with Hajduk Split in Croatia, transferred to Shakhtar Donetsk in Ukraine, then joined Spartak Moscow in Russia, in 2007. After spending one season with Tottenham Hotspur in the English Premier League, he returned to Russia in 2011 with Rostov, then moved to Deportivo de La Coruña of the Spanish La Liga in 2015, where he retired.

Pletikosa made his international debut for Croatia in 1999, and went on to represent the country in five major tournaments. He is the fourth-most capped player in the history of the Croatia national team after Luka Modrić, Darijo Srna and Ivan Perišić, having made 114 appearances. Pletikosa retired from international football following the 2014 FIFA World Cup.

== Playing career ==
=== Club ===
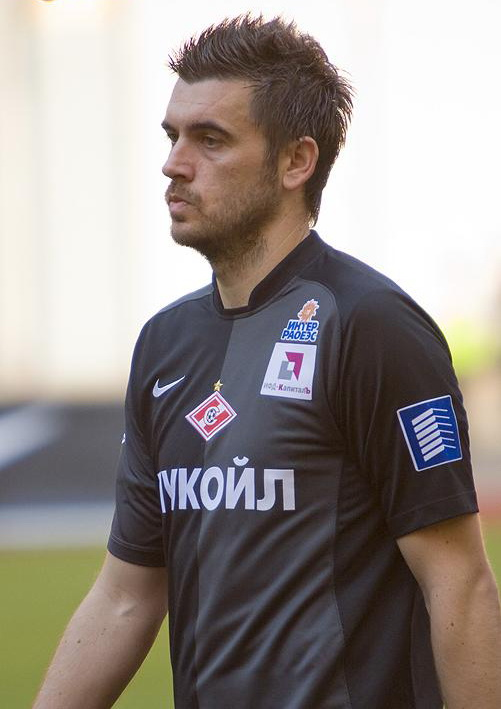
Pletikosa playing for Spartak Moscow in 2008

On 31 August 2010, Pletikosa signed a season-long loan with Tottenham Hotspur of the English Premier League. In July 2011, he began a trial at Scottish Premier League club Celtic, playing in friendly matches against Cardiff City (away) and against Premier League club Wolverhampton Wanderers (home). On 6 August 2011, Pletikosa signed a two-year contract with Russian Premier League club Rostov. On 20 December 2015, he signed for La Liga club Deportivo de La Coruña on a six-month contract to replace the injured Fabricio Agosto Ramírez.

=== International ===
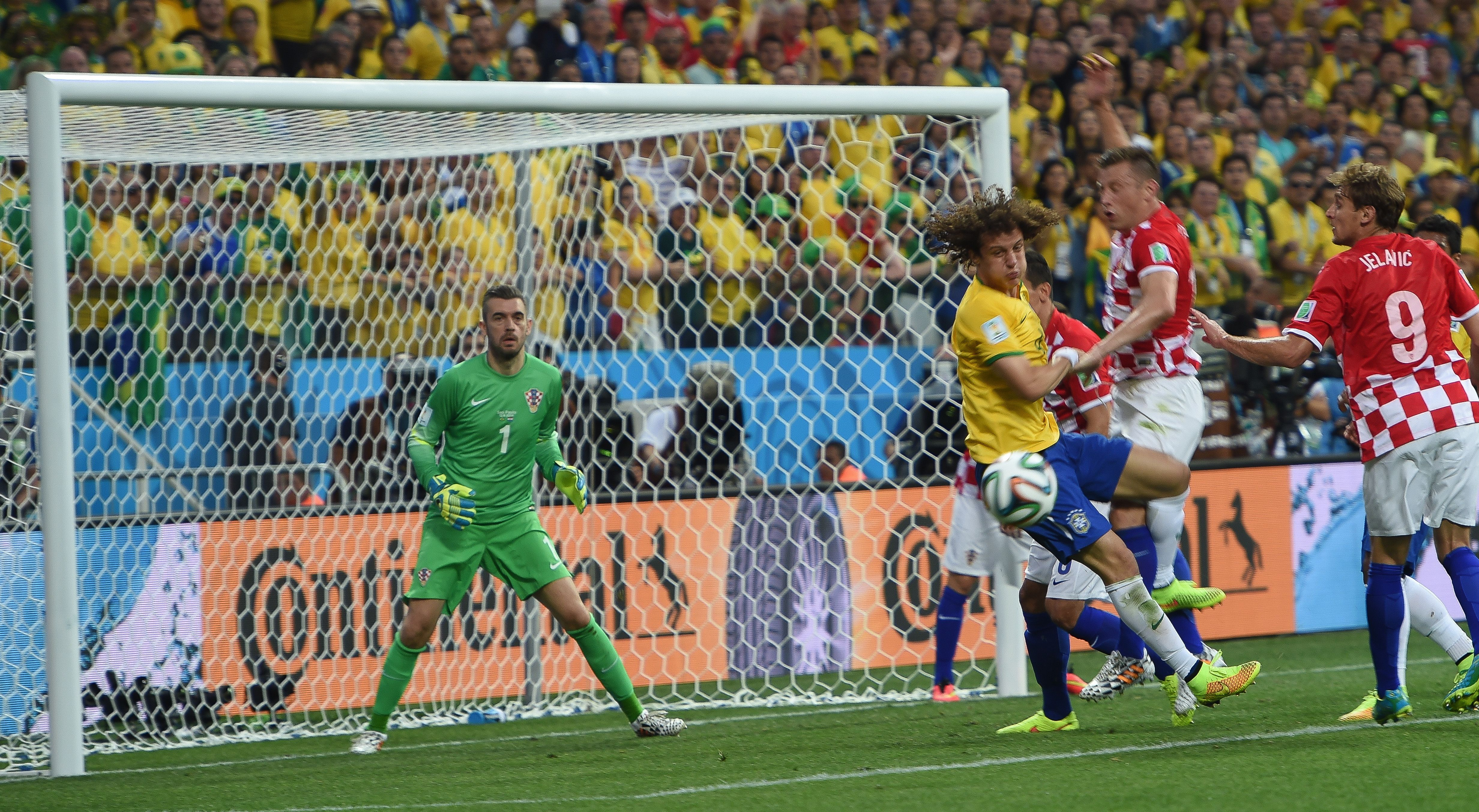
Pletikosa keeping for Croatia at the 2014 FIFA World Cup

On 6 February 2013, Pletikosa played his 100th international match for Croatia, keeping a clean sheet in a 4–0 win against South Korea.

In the opening match of the 2014 World Cup, played on 12 June against hosts Brazil, a penalty was given against Croatia that resulted in a 1–1 draw. Pletikosa made contact with Neymar's spot kick, but could not prevent it from going in. Croatia eventually lost 3–1. On 17 July 2014, following the World Cup, Pletikosa announced his retirement from the national team.

== Personal life ==
Pletikosa is a practising Roman Catholic who was known to wear a T-shirt with a picture of the Virgin Mary under his uniform for good luck when he played.

== Career statistics ==
=== Club ===
Club	Season	League			National cup		Continental		Other (Note: Includes Football League Cup, Russian Relegation Play-offs, and Russian Super Cup)		Total	
Club	Season	Division	Apps	Goals	Apps	Goals	Apps	Goals	Apps	Goals	Apps	Goals
Hajduk Split	1996–97	Prva HNL	1	0			0	0	—		1	0
Hajduk Split	1997–98	Prva HNL	1	0			0	0	—		1	0
Hajduk Split	1998–99	Prva HNL	19	0			0	0	—		19	0
Hajduk Split	1999–2000	Prva HNL	32	0			3	0	—		35	0
Hajduk Split	2000–01	Prva HNL	31	1			2	0	—		33	1
Hajduk Split	2001–02	Prva HNL	27	0			6	0	—		33	0
Hajduk Split	2002–03	Prva HNL	30	3			4	2	—		34	5
Hajduk Split	Total		162	4			15	2	—		177	6
Shakhtar Donetsk	2003–04	Vyshcha Liha	23	0			6	0	0	0	29	0
Shakhtar Donetsk	2004–05	Vyshcha Liha	6	0			0	0	0	0	6	0
Shakhtar Donetsk	2006–07	Vyshcha Liha	3	0			1	0	0	0	4	0
Shakhtar Donetsk	Total		32	0			7	0	0	0	39	0
Hajduk Split (loan)	2005–06	Prva HNL	21	0			—		—		21	0
Spartak Moscow	2007	Russian Premier League	29	0	4	0	2	0	—		35	0
Spartak Moscow	2008	Russian Premier League	30	0	0	0	8	0	—		38	0
Spartak Moscow	2009	Russian Premier League	4	0	2	0	—		—		6	0
Spartak Moscow	2010	Russian Premier League	0	0	0	0	0	0	—		0	0
Spartak Moscow	Total		63	0	6	0	10	0	0	0	79	0
Tottenham Hotspur (loan)	2010–11	Premier League	0	0	0	0	0	0	1	0	1	0
Rostov	2011–12	Russian Premier League	23	0	0	0	—		2	0	25	0
Rostov	2012–13	Russian Premier League	30	0	3	0	—		2	0	35	0
Rostov	2013–14	Russian Premier League	27	0	3	0	—		—		30	0
Rostov	2014–15	Russian Premier League	30	0	0	0	2	0	3	0	35	0
Rostov	Total		110	0	6	0	2	0	7	0	125	0
Deportivo La Coruña	2015–16	La Liga	2	0	—		—		—		2	0
Career total			369	4	12	0	34	2	8	0	422	6

=== International ===
Croatia
Year	Apps	Goals
1999	3	0
2000	5	0
2001	7	0
2002	10	0
2003	12	0
2004	5	0
2005	4	0
2006	11	0
2007	8	0
2008	12	0
2009	2	0
2010	2	0
2011	8	0
2012	10	0
2013	10	0
2014	5	0
Total	114	0

== See also ==
- List of men's footballers with 100 or more international caps
