= Petar Krpan =

Croatian retired footballer (born 1974)

Personal information
- Date of birth: 1 July 1974 (age 52)
- Place of birth: Osijek, Croatia
- Height: 1.78 m (5 ft 10 in)
- Position: Forward

Team information
- Current team: Croatia U17 (coach)

Youth career
- Osijek

Senior career*
Years	Team	Apps	(Gls)
1993–1998	Osijek	96	(26)
1998–1999	Sporting CP	29	(3)
1999–2001	União Leiria	46	(5)
2001	Osijek	10	(6)
2002	NK Zagreb	14	(5)
2002–2004	Hajduk Split	55	(21)
2004–2005	União Leiria	26	(5)
2005–2006	Rijeka	17	(4)
2006	Jiangsu Sainty	6	(3)
2006–2007	Inter Zaprešić	16	(11)
Total		302	(84)

International career
1998	Croatia	3	(0)

Managerial career
- 2017–: Croatia U17
Medal record
Competitor for Croatia
Bronze medal – third place	FIFA World Cup	1998
- * Club domestic league appearances and goals

Petar Krpan (born 1 July 1974) is a Croatian retired footballer who played as a forward.

== Club career ==
Born in Osijek, Socialist Federal Republic of Yugoslavia, Krpan started his career with local club NK Osijek. Due to the war breaking out in 1991, as a 17-year-old he engaged in battle to help save his hometown. He moved to Sporting Clube de Portugal in 1998, being scarcely used during his one-and-a-half-season spell.

In January 2000, staying in Portugal, Krpan left for U.D. Leiria and played for the team until the summer of 2001, initially on loan. He then returned to Croatia and played one season apiece for Osijek, NK Zagreb and HNK Hajduk Split, before returning to Leiria for 2004–05; he was an important attacking element during the campaign as the latter team barely avoided relegation from the Primeira Liga, notably scoring in a 1–1 away draw against FC Porto.

In 2005, Krpan once again moved back to his country by joining HNK Rijeka, where he spent one season before moving to second division side NK Inter Zaprešić.

== International career ==
Krpan won three caps for the Croatia national team in 1998, all as a second-half substitute. His debut occurred on 6 June in a friendly match with Australia, in Zagreb. His final international was a September 1998 European Championship qualification match away against the Republic of Ireland.

Krpan was a member of the bronze medal-winning squad at the 1998 FIFA World Cup where he made one appearance, playing the last 13 minutes of the round-of-16 match against Romania (1–0).

== Honours ==
=== Club ===
NK Zagreb

- Croatian First League: 2001–02

Hajduk Split

- Croatian First League: 2003–04
- Croatian Football Cup: 2002–03

Rijeka

- Croatian Football Cup: 2005–06

Inter Zaprešić

- Croatian Second League: 2006–07

=== Individual ===
- Franjo Bučar State Award for Sport: 1998

=== Orders ===
- Order of the Croatian Interlace – 1998
