= Vlatko Đolonga =

Croatian footballer (born 1976)

Personal information
- Full name: Vlatko Đolonga
- Date of birth: 30 September 1976 (age 50)
- Place of birth: Split, SR Croatia, Yugoslavia
- Height: 1.85 m (6 ft 1 in)
- Position: Defender

Youth career
- RNK Split
- Hajduk Split

Senior career*
| Years | Team | Apps | (Gls) |
| –1995 | Hajduk Split | 0 | (0) |
| 1995–1996 | → Uskok (loan) | 16 | (1) |
| 1995–1996 | Solin Građa | | |
| 1996–1997 | Orijent | 28 | (1) |
| 1997–2000 | Hrvatski Dragovoljac | 87 | (15) |
| 2000–2001 | Deportivo Alavés | 3 | (0) |
| 2001–2007 | Hajduk Split | 110 | (16) |
| 2007 | Mosor | 2 | (0) |

International career
| 2001–2002 | Croatia | 3 | (0) |
- * Club domestic league appearances and goals

Vlatko Đolonga (born 30 September 1976) is a retired Croatian football defender. He made his debut for the Croatia national football team in a friendly match against South Korea on 10 November 2001. He has a total of three international caps.

== Club career ==
Đolonga started his career at his hometown club Hajduk Split. In the 1994/1995 season, he was loaned out to NK Uskok, that won the Druga HNL. However, he got injured and Hajduk did not want to offer him a senior contract. He moved to Solin Građa for the 1995/1996 season, and in the 1996/1997 season made his Prva HNL debut with NK Orijent. The following year he moved, this time to Hrvatski Dragovoljac, where he played 87 games in three seasons before moving to Spain to play for Deportivo Alavés. After playing just three games, he returned to Croatia to play for Hajduk Split. After his contract ended in June 2007, Đolonga joined NK Mosor, but decided to retire from football in September 2007, after playing just two games for the club.

== International career ==
He made his debut for Croatia in a November 2001 friendly match away against South Korea, coming on as a 46th-minute substitute for Josip Šimunić, and earned a total of 3 caps, scoring no goals. His final international was a November 2002 friendly away against Romania.
