= Mario Carević =

Croatian footballer and manager

Personal information
- Date of birth: 29 March 1982 (age 44)
- Place of birth: Makarska, SR Croatia, Yugoslavia
- Height: 1.86 m (6 ft 1 in)
- Position: Midfielder

Team information
- Current team: Gorica (manager)

Youth career
- 1989–1999: Hajduk Split

Senior career*
Years	Team	Apps	(Gls)
1999–2004	Hajduk Split	104	(7)
2004–2005	Al-Ittihad		
2005–2007	VfB Stuttgart	6	(0)
2006–2007	→ Hajduk Split (loan)	17	(4)
2007–2010	Lokeren	82	(10)
2010–2013	Kortrijk	37	(1)
2011–2012	→ Maccabi Petah Tikva (loan)	26	(0)
2014	Krka	18	(1)
Total		288	(23)

International career
1998	Croatia U15	5	(0)
1999	Croatia U16	1	(0)
1998–2000	Croatia U17	5	(1)
1999–2001	Croatia U19	6	(1)
2000–2001	Croatia U20	2	(0)
2001–2004	Croatia U21	19	(0)
2003	Croatia	1	(0)

Managerial career
- 2014–2016: Krka (assistant)
- 2018-2019: Hajduk Split (assistant)
- 2019-2020: Hrvatski Dragovoljac
- 2019-2020: Rudeš
- 2020-2021: Varaždin
- 2021–2023: Krka
- 2023–2024: Šibenik
- 2024–2026: Gorica
- * Club domestic league appearances and goals

Mario Carević (born 29 March 1982) is a Croatian professional football manager and former player who played as a midfielder. Since October 2024, he is the manager of Gorica.

Carević made his debut for the Croatia national team in a friendly match against Macedonia in 2003. While he was a regular for the Croatian youth selections from under-15 to under-21, he was capped only once for the senior national team.

== Club career ==
Carević started his professional career at Hajduk Split, playing five seasons before moving to Saudi Arabia to play for Al-Ittihad (Jeddah). He then spent a season in Germany playing for Bundesliga side VfB Stuttgart, before returning to Split in 2006 on a one-year loan. In the season 2007–08 he played for SC Lokeren, a club from Belgian first division. In 2010, he joined Kortrijk, who loaned him out to Maccabi Petah Tikva of the Israeli Premier League during the 2011–12 season.

== Managerial career ==
In September 2018, Carević joined his former club Hajduk Split, this time as an assistant manager, as part of newly appointed coaching staff under manager Zoran Vulić. In a previous coaching stint at the club, Carević was a player under Vulić. In fact, Carević, with 107 appearances, was Vulić's most used player in the 156 matches he spent on the bench of Hajduk. At the end of November 2018 Vulić was sacked and Carević left the club's staff.

On 1 May 2019 Carević was appointed the manager of Hrvatski Dragovoljac, following the departure of Krešimir Sunara. He left the club in the following month after four games in charge with a record of one victory, one draw and two defeats.

A month after his departure from Hrvatski Dragovoljac, he became an assistant manager under manager Ognjen Vukojević, in the Croatia U20's coaching staff.

In September 2020, he was named the manager of Rudeš playing in the Druga HNL. He was sacked on 22 March 2021. The club explained the move by stating that Carević's job was to stabilize the club in the league, which he managed to do as they were fifth at that moment. He was dismissed as manager of Varaždin after only six games in charge in September 2021, only to return to Slovenia the same month to manage Krka.

== Managerial statistics ==
As of 26 September 2021

Managerial record by team and tenure
Team	From	To	Record				
Team	From	To	G	W	D	L	Win %
Hrvatski Dragovoljac	1 May 2019	9 June 2019	4	1	1	2	25.00
Rudeš	21 September 2020	22 March 2021	19	10	5	4	52.63
Varaždin	17 June 2021	20 September 2021	6	1	3	2	16.67
Total			29	12	9	8	41.38
