= Zvonimir Deranja =

Croatian footballer

Personal information
- Full name: Zvonimir Deranja
- Date of birth: 22 September 1979 (age 47)
- Place of birth: Dubrovnik, SR Croatia, Yugoslavia
- Height: 1.74 m (5 ft 9 in)
- Position: Striker

Team information
- Current team: Al Nassr (youth coach)

Youth career
- Slaven Gruda
- HNK Dubrovnik
- 1993–1996: Hajduk Split

Senior career*
Years	Team	Apps	(Gls)
1996–2004	Hajduk Split	126	(52)
2004–2005	Le Mans	16	(4)
2005–2006	Hajduk Split	8	(1)
2006–2007	FC Libourne-Saint-Seurin	44	(19)
2008–2010	Mouscron	5	(1)
2010	RNK Split	8	(0)
Total		207	(77)

International career
1995–1996	Croatia U-17	7	(3)
1996–1998	Croatia U-19	12	(3)
1998–2001	Croatia U-21	17	(9)

Managerial career
- –2019: NA Konavle (youth coach)
- 2019–2021: Al Wahda (youth coach)
- 2021–2022: Damac (youth coach)
- 2023–2025: Al Nassr (youth coach)
- 2025-: Hajduk Split (assistant coach)
- * Club domestic league appearances and goals

Zvonimir Deranja (born 22 September 1979) is a retired Croatian footballer and current assistant coach at Hajduk Split.

== Club career ==
Deranja began his football career with local clubs NK Slaven from Gruda and HNK Dubrovnik. He was discovered by Hajduk Split scouts and moved to the club's youth squad. In 1996, he joined the club's senior squad in the Croatian First League. He remained with the club until 2004, returning the following season after an unsuccessful year in France. In 2006, he moved to the French Ligue 2 again, this time with FC Libourne-Saint-Seurin, with whom he received more frequent playing time.

== International career ==
Deranja has not been capped for the Croatia national team. However, he has played extensively for the country's junior sides. He was a member of the Croatian side at the 1999 FIFA World Youth Championship squads.

== Coaching career ==
Towards the end of his career, and for several years after, Deranja worked as a youth coach in NA Konavle, among others together with Frane Lojić. Also in Slaven Gruda.

In 2019, Deranja traveled to the Emirates and became the youth coach of Al Wahda FC. In August 2021, Deranja moved further around the Middle East, this time to Saudi Arabia, where he became youth coach at Damac FC. In early January 2023, he joined Al Nassr FC.
