= Nino Bule =

Croatian footballer (born 1976)

Personal information
- Date of birth: 19 March 1976 (age 50)
- Place of birth: Čapljina, SR Bosnia and Herzegovina, SFR Yugoslavia
- Height: 1.88 m (6 ft 2 in)
- Position: Striker

Senior career*
Years	Team	Apps	(Gls)
1995–2000	NK Zagreb	110	(30)
2000–2001	Gamba Osaka	40	(23)
2002–2004	Hajduk Split	65	(15)
2004	Pasching	16	(0)
2005	Austria Salzburg	8	(3)
2005–2006	Admira Wacker Mödling	27	(7)
2006–2008	Rijeka	49	(8)
2008	Inter Zaprešić	14	(7)
2009	Panserraikos	11	(1)
2009–2011	Lokomotiva Zagreb	70	(28)

International career
1997	Croatia U21	4	(2)
1998–1999	Croatia B	2	(0)
1999–2004	Croatia	3	(0)

Managerial career
- 2016–2017: Novigrad
- 2018–2020: Dinamo Zagreb (assistant)
- 2020–2022: Osijek (assistant)
- * Club domestic league appearances and goals

Nino Bule (born 19 March 1976) is a Croatian football manager and former player who played as a striker. He is a most recently assistant manager of Croatian club NK Osijek.

== International career ==
Bule made his debut for Croatia in a June 1999 Korea Cup match against Egypt, coming on as a 72nd-minute substitute for Jasmin Agić, and earned a total of 3 caps scoring no goals. His final international was a February 2004 friendly against Germany. He also played in two friendly matches for the Croatian national B team, and was also a member of the country's under-21 team in 1997, scoring two goals in four appearances.

== Career statistics ==
=== Club ===
Appearances and goals by club, season and competition
Club	Season	League		
Club	Season	Division	Apps	Goals
NK Zagreb	1995–96	Croatian First Football League	3	0
NK Zagreb	1996–97	Croatian First Football League	16	3
NK Zagreb	1997–98	Croatian First Football League	29	5
NK Zagreb	1998–99	Croatian First Football League	29	13
NK Zagreb	1999–2000	Croatian First Football League	33	9
NK Zagreb	Total		110	30
Gamba Osaka	2000	J1 League	13	6
Gamba Osaka	2001	J1 League	27	17
Gamba Osaka	Total		40	23
Hajduk Split	2002–03	Croatian First Football League	29	6
Hajduk Split	2003–04	Croatian First Football League	27	9
Hajduk Split	Total		56	15
Pasching	2004–05	Austrian Bundesliga	16	0
Austria Salzburg	2004–05	Austrian Bundesliga	8	3
Admira Wacker Mödling	2005–06	Austrian Bundesliga	27	7
Rijeka	2006–07	Croatian First Football League	21	4
Rijeka	2007–08	Croatian First Football League	28	3
Rijeka	Total		49	7
Inter Zaprešić	2008–09	Croatian First Football League	14	7
Panserraikos	2008–09	Super League Greece	11	1
Lokomotiva Zagreb	2009–10	Croatian First Football League		
Career total			340	95

=== International ===
Appearances and goals by national team and year
National team	Year	Apps	Goals
Croatia	1999	1	0
Croatia	2000	0	0
Croatia	2001	0	0
Croatia	2002	1	0
Croatia	2003	0	0
Croatia	2004	1	0
Total		3	0
