= 1983–84 NK Hajduk Split season =

Hajduk Split
1983–84 season
- Chairman: Ivo Šantić
- Manager: Petar Nadoveza
- First League: 5th
- Yugoslav Cup: Winners
- UEFA Cup: Semi-finals
- Top goalscorer: League: Zlatko Vujović (9); All: Zlatko Vujović (13)
- Highest home attendance: 52,500 v Sparta Prague, 21 March 1984
- Lowest home attendance: 2,500 v Galenika, 16 November 1983

The 1983–84 season was the 73rd season in Hajduk Split’s history and their 38th in the Yugoslav First League. Their 2nd place finish in the 1982–83 season meant it was their 38th successive season playing in the Yugoslav First League.

== Competitions ==
=== Overall ===
Competition	Started round	Final result	First match	Last Match
1983–84 Yugoslav First League	–	5th	14 August	30 May
1983–84 Yugoslav Cup	First round	Winners	21 September	24 May
1983–84 UEFA Cup	First round	Semi-finals	14 September	25 April

=== Yugoslav First League ===
==== Classification ====
Pos	Team	Pld	W	D	L	GF	GA	GD	Pts	Qualification or relegation
3	Željezničar	34	15	12	7	52	35	+17	42	Qualification for UEFA Cup first round
4	Rijeka	34	16	10	8	53	37	+16	42	Qualification for UEFA Cup first round
5	Hajduk Split	34	12	15	7	39	22	+17	39	Qualification for Cup Winners' Cup first round
6	Osijek	34	12	10	12	36	39	−3	34	
7	Radnički Niš	34	15	3	16	40	47	−7	33	

Source: rsssf.org
Rules for classification: 1) points; 2) goal difference; 3) number of goals scored.

==== Results summary ====
Overall								Home						Away					
Pld	W	D	L	GF	GA	GD	Pts	W	D	L	GF	GA	GD	W	D	L	GF	GA	GD
33	17	12	4	39	22	+17	63	9	7	1	32	9	+23	8	5	3	7	13	−6

==== Results by round ====
Round	1	2	3	4	5	6	7	8	9	10	11	12	13	14	15	16	17	18	19	20	21	22	23	24	25	26	27	28	29	30	31	32	33	34
Ground	A	H	A	H	A	H	A	H	A	A	H	A	H	A	H	A	H	H	A	H	A	H	A	H	A	H	H	A	H	A	H	A	H	A
Result	W	D	D	W	D	W	L	W	L	D	W	D	W	D	D	D	D	W	D	D	W	W	L	D	D	L	D	L	W	W	W	L	D	L
Position	5	6	8	2	2	1	3	2	4	2	3	1	1	1	1	1	1	1	1	1	1	1	1	1	2	3	2	5	4	3	3	4	5	5

Source: Competitive matches
A = Away; H = Home; W = Win; D = Draw; L = Loss

== Matches ==
=== Yugoslav First League ===
Round	Date	Venue	Opponent	Score	Attendance	Hajduk Scorers
1	14 Aug	A	Olimpija	1 – 0	15,000	Bogdanović
2	21 Aug	H	Vojvodina	0 – 0	13,000	
3	28 Aug	A	Sarajevo	0 – 0	20,000	
4	31 Aug	H	Čelik	4 – 0	10,000	Vulić, Zl. Vujović, Bursać, Cukrov
5	4 Sep	A	Osijek	0 – 0	15,000	
6	11 Sep	H	Vardar	2 – 0	8,000	Šalov, Vulić
7	18 Sep	A	Red Star	0 – 2	30,000	
8	25 Sep	H	Velež	2 – 0	14,000	Zo. Vujović, Cukrov
9	2 Oct	A	Radnički Niš	0 – 1	8,000	
10	5 Oct	A	Dinamo Vinkovci	1 – 1	7,000	Adamović
11	16 Oct	H	Sloboda	5 – 0	10,000	Pešić (2), Zl. Vujović (2), Slišković
12	23 Oct	A	Željezničar	0 – 0	10,000	
13	30 Oct	H	Budućnost	3 – 0	9,000	Zl. Vujović (2), Slišković
14	6 Nov	A	Prishtina	0 – 0	32,000	
15	20 Nov	H	Partizan	0 – 0	27,000	
16	27 Nov	A	Rijeka	1 – 1	6,000	Zl. Vujović
17	4 Dec	H	Dinamo Zagreb	1 – 1	25,000	Jerolimov
18	26 Feb	H	Olimpija	3 – 0	8,000	Zl. Vujović (2), Pešić
19	29 Feb	A	Vojvodina	0 – 0	20,000	
20	4 Mar	H	Sarajevo	1 – 1	14,000	Zo. Vujović
21	10 Mar	A	Čelik	1 – 0	7,000	Pešić
22	17 Mar	H	Osijek	3 – 0	10,000	Prekazi, Zl. Vujović, Karačić (o.g.)
23	24 Mar	A	Vardar	0 – 2	25,000	
24	28 Mar	H	Red Star	1 – 1	35,000	Slišković
25	7 Apr	A	Velež	1 – 1	12,000	D. Čop
26	15 Apr	H	Radnički Niš	1 – 2	9,000	Jerolimov
27	21 Apr	H	Dinamo Vinkovci	2 – 2	9,000	Prekazi, Pešić
28	29 Apr	A	Sloboda	0 – 1	7,000	
29	6 May	H	Željezničar	2 – 1	12,000	Jerolimov (2)
30	13 May	A	Budućnost	1 – 0	8,000	Slišković
31	16 May	H	Prishtina	2 – 1	8,000	Pešić, Slišković
32	20 May	A	Partizan	0 – 1	27,000	
33	27 May	H	Rijeka	0 – 0	7,000	
34	30 May	A	Dinamo Zagreb	1 – 3	35,000	Andrijašević

Sources: hajduk.hr

=== Yugoslav Cup ===
Round	Date	Venue	Opponent	Score	Attendance	Hajduk Scorers
R1	21 Sep	A	Maribor	1 – 0	12,000	Cukrov
R2	16 Nov	H	Galenika	6 – 2	2,500	Adamović (3), Šušnjara, Slišković, Zo. Vujović
QF	18 Apr	A	Sarajevo	4 – 0	7,000	Jerolimov (2), Gudelj, Prekazi
SF	2 May	H	Metalac Sisak	2 – 1	3,500	Zl. Vujović, Vulić
Final	9 May	H	Red Star	2 – 1	12,000	Slišković, Vulić
Final	24 May	A	Red Star	0 – 0	70,000	

Sources: hajduk.hr

=== UEFA Cup ===
Round	Date	Venue	Opponent	Score	Attendance	Hajduk Scorers
R1	14 Sep	A (Romania)	Universitatea Craiova (Romania)	0 – 1	40,000	
R1	28 Sep	H	Universitatea Craiova (Romania)	1 – 0 (3 – 1 p)	50,000	Zo. Vujović
R2	19 Oct	A (Hungary)	Budapest Honvéd (Hungary)	2 – 3	5,000	Cukrov, Pešić
R2	2 Nov	H	Budapest Honvéd (Hungary)	3 – 0	50,000	Pešić (2), Zo. Vujović
R3	23 Nov	A	Radnički Niš	2 – 0	20,002	Zl. Vujović, Vulić
R3	7 Dec	H	Radnički Niš	2 – 0	25,000	Zl. Vujović (2)
QF	7 Mar	A (Czechoslovakia)	Sparta Prague (Czechoslovakia)	0 – 1	38,000	
QF	21 Mar	H	Sparta Prague (Czechoslovakia)	2 – 0 (a.e.t.)	52,500	Gudelj, Slišković
SF	11 Apr	H	Tottenham Hotspur (England)	2 – 1	35,000	Gudelj, Pešić
SF	25 Apr	A (England)	Tottenham Hotspur (England)	0 – 1	43,969	

Source: hajduk.hr

== Player seasonal records ==
=== Top scorers ===
Rank	Name	League	Europe	Cup	Total
1	(Socialist Federal Republic of Yugoslavia) Zlatko Vujović	9	3	1	13
2	(Socialist Federal Republic of Yugoslavia) Dušan Pešić	6	4	–	10
2	(Socialist Federal Republic of Yugoslavia) Blaž Slišković	5	1	2	8
4	(Socialist Federal Republic of Yugoslavia) Ive Jerolimov	4	–	2	6
5	(Socialist Federal Republic of Yugoslavia) Zoran Vujović	2	2	1	5
5	(Socialist Federal Republic of Yugoslavia) Zoran Vulić	2	1	2	5
7	(Socialist Federal Republic of Yugoslavia) Zdenko Adamović	1	–	3	4
7	(Socialist Federal Republic of Yugoslavia) Nikica Cukrov	2	1	1	4
9	(Socialist Federal Republic of Yugoslavia) Dževad Prekazi	2	–	1	3
9	(Socialist Federal Republic of Yugoslavia) Ivan Gudelj	–	2	1	3
11	(Socialist Federal Republic of Yugoslavia) Stjepan Andrijašević	1	–	–	1
11	(Socialist Federal Republic of Yugoslavia) Mladen Bogdanović	1	–	–	1
11	(Socialist Federal Republic of Yugoslavia) Miloš Bursać	1	–	–	1
11	(Socialist Federal Republic of Yugoslavia) Davor Čop	1	–	–	1
11	(Socialist Federal Republic of Yugoslavia) Nenad Šalov	1	–	–	1
11	(Socialist Federal Republic of Yugoslavia) Goran Šušnjara	–	–	1	1
	Own goals	1	–	–	1
	TOTALS	39	14	15	68

Source: Competitive matches

== See also ==
- 1983–84 Yugoslav First League
- 1983–84 Yugoslav Cup

== External sources ==
- 1983–84 Yugoslav First League at rsssf.com
- 1983–84 Yugoslav Cup at rsssf.com
- 1983–84 UEFA Cup at rsssf.com
- 1983–84 Yugoslav First League at historical-lineups.com
