= 1981–82 NK Hajduk Split season =

Hajduk Split
1981–82 season
- Chairman: Ivo Šantić
- Manager: Ante Mladinić
- First League: 3rd
- Yugoslav Cup: Quarter-finals
- UEFA Cup: Third round
- Top goalscorer: League: Zlatko Vujović (14); All: Zlatko Vujović (17)
- Highest home attendance: 65,000 v Dinamo, 28 February 1982
- Lowest home attendance: 5,000 v Osijek, 28 April 1982

The 1981–82 season was the 71st season in Hajduk Split’s history and their 36th in the Yugoslav First League. Their 2nd place finish in the 1980–81 season meant it was their 36th successive season playing in the Yugoslav First League.

== Competitions ==
=== Overall ===
Competition	Started round	Final result	First match	Last Match
1981–82 Yugoslav First League	–	3rd	26 July	2 May
1981–82 Yugoslav Cup	First round	Quarter-finals	7 October	18 November
1981–82 UEFA Cup	First round	Third round	16 September	9 December

=== Yugoslav First League ===
==== Classification ====
Pos	Team	Pld	W	D	L	GF	GA	GD	Pts	Qualification or relegation
1	Dinamo Zagreb (C)	34	20	9	5	67	32	+35	49	Qualification for European Cup first round
2	Red Star Belgrade	34	17	10	7	68	40	+28	44	Qualification for Cup Winners' Cup first round
3	Hajduk Split	34	17	10	7	53	31	+22	44	Qualification for UEFA Cup first round
4	Sarajevo	34	16	7	11	57	54	+3	39	Qualification for UEFA Cup first round
5	Željezničar	34	16	6	12	52	37	+15	38	

Source: rsssf.org
Rules for classification: 1) points; 2) goal difference; 3) number of goals scored.
(C) Champions

==== Results summary ====
Overall								Home						Away					
Pld	W	D	L	GF	GA	GD	Pts	W	D	L	GF	GA	GD	W	D	L	GF	GA	GD
34	17	10	7	53	31	+22	61	12	1	4	36	18	+18	5	9	3	17	13	+4

==== Results by round ====
Round	1	2	3	4	5	6	7	8	9	10	11	12	13	14	15	16	17	18	19	20	21	22	23	24	25	26	27	28	29	30	31	32	33	34
Ground	A	H	A	H	A	H	A	A	H	A	H	A	H	A	H	A	H	H	A	H	A	H	A	H	H	A	H	A	H	A	H	A	H	A
Result	W	W	D	L	D	L	L	D	W	L	L	W	D	W	D	D	W	W	W	L	D	W	D	W	W	W	W	L	W	D	W	W	W	D
Position	5	2	3	5	8	12	13	13	11	13	15	13	12	12	10	8	6	6	4	5	5	5	4	3	3	3	3	3	3	3	3	3	2	3

Source: Competitive matches
A = Away; H = Home; W = Win; D = Draw; L = Loss

== Matches ==
=== Yugoslav First League ===
Round	Date	Venue	Opponent	Score	Attendance	Hajduk Scorers
1	26 Jul	A	Vardar	1 – 0	18,000	Zl. Vujović
2	2 Aug	H	Željezničar	2 – 1	25,000	Bogdanović, Zl. Vujović
3	9 Aug	A	Dinamo Zagreb	0 – 0	50,000	
4	16 Aug	H	Velež	0 – 3^{1}	7,000	
5	23 Aug	A	Budućnost	0 – 0	15,000	
6	30 Aug	H	OFK Beograd	1 – 4	20,000	Zo. Vujović
7	12 Sep	A	Red Star	1 – 2	40,000	Zl. Vujović
8	20 Sep	A	Radnički Niš	0 – 0	8,000	
9	23 Sep	H	Sloboda	2 – 1	20,000	Zo. Vujović, Bogdanović
10	26 Sep	A	Teteks	0 – 1	8,000	
11	4 Oct	H	Sarajevo	1 – 4	15,000	Vulić
12	11 Oct	A	NK Zagreb	3 – 0	15,000	Vulić, Zl. Vujović, Gudelj
13	25 Oct	H	Vojvodina	0 – 0	8,000	
14	28 Oct	A	Partizan	3 – 2	25,000	Zo. Vujović, Pešić, Slišković
15	31 Oct	H	Rijeka	2 – 0	8,000	Šalov (2)
16	8 Nov	A	Osijek	1 – 1	12,000	Zl. Vujović
17	15 Nov	H	Olimpija	3 – 1	11,000	Gudelj (2), Vulić
18	14 Feb	H	Vardar	2 – 0	8,000	Zo. Vujović (2)
19	20 Feb	A	Željezničar	2 – 1	15,000	Zl. Vujović, Čop
20	28 Feb	H	Dinamo Zagreb	1 – 2	65,000^{2}	Zo. Vujović
21	7 Mar	A	Velež	1 – 1	20,000	Zo. Vujović
22	10 Mar	H	Budućnost	2 – 1	12,000	Macan, Šalov
23	14 Mar	A	OFK Beograd	2 – 2	5,000	Slišković, Vulić
24	21 Mar	H	Red Star	1 – 0	40,000	Vulić
25	24 Mar	H	Radnički Niš	1 – 0	13,000	Čop
26	28 Mar	A	Sloboda	1 – 0	6,000	Smailagić (o.g.)
27	31 Mar	H	Teteks	7 – 0	10,000	Zl. Vujović (4), Šalov (2), Primorac
28	4 Apr	A	Sarajevo	0 – 1	5,000	
29	11 Apr	H	NK Zagreb	4 – 0	9,000	Zl. Vujović (2), Krstičević, Pešić
30	14 Apr	A	Vojvodina	0 – 0	4,000	
31	18 Apr	H	Partizan	3 – 0	20,000	Rožić, Zo. Vujović, Zl. Vujović
32	25 Apr	A	Rijeka	1 – 1	14,000	Zo. Vujović
33	28 Apr	H	Osijek	4 – 1	5,000	Pešić (2), Zl. Vujović, Čop
34	2 May	A	Olimpija	1 – 1	12,000	Zo. Vujović

Sources: hajduk.hr

=== Yugoslav Cup ===
Round	Date	Venue	Opponent	Score	Attendance	Hajduk Scorers
R1	7 Oct	A	Novi Sad	1 – 1 (5 – 4 p)	3,500	Primorac
R2	11 Nov	H	Napredak Kruševac	3 – 1	3,000	Gudelj (2), Šalov
QF	18 Nov	A	Galenika	1 – 2	10,000	Gudelj

Sources: hajduk.hr

=== UEFA Cup ===
Round	Date	Venue	Opponent	Score	Attendance	Hajduk Scorers
R1	16 Sep	H	Stuttgart (West Germany)	3 – 1	35,000	Zl. Vujović (2), Zo. Vujović
R1	30 Sep	A (West Germany)	Stuttgart (West Germany)	2 – 2	39,000	Bogdanović, Jelikić
R2	21 Oct	A (Belgium)	Beveren (Belgium)	3 – 2	19,600	Gudelj, Zl. Vujović, Slišković
R2	4 Nov	H	Beveren (Belgium)	1 – 2	25,000	Pešić
R3	25 Nov	A (Spain)	Valencia (Spain)	1 – 5	25,000	Zo. Vujović
R3	9 Dec	H	Valencia (Spain)	4 – 1	50,000	Gudelj (3), Primorac

Source: hajduk.hr

== Player seasonal records ==
=== Top scorers ===
Rank	Name	League	Europe	Cup	Total
1	(Socialist Federal Republic of Yugoslavia) Zlatko Vujović	14	3	–	17
2	(Socialist Federal Republic of Yugoslavia) Zoran Vujović	10	3	–	13
3	(Socialist Federal Republic of Yugoslavia) Ivan Gudelj	3	4	3	10
4	(Socialist Federal Republic of Yugoslavia) Nenad Šalov	5	–	1	6
5	(Socialist Federal Republic of Yugoslavia) Zoran Vulić	5	–	–	5
5	(Socialist Federal Republic of Yugoslavia) Dušan Pešić	4	1	–	5
7	(Socialist Federal Republic of Yugoslavia) Blaž Slišković	3	1	–	4
8	(Socialist Federal Republic of Yugoslavia) Mladen Bogdanović	2	1	–	3
8	(Socialist Federal Republic of Yugoslavia) Davor Čop	3	–	–	3
8	(Socialist Federal Republic of Yugoslavia) Boro Primorac	1	1	1	3
11	(Socialist Federal Republic of Yugoslavia) Zoran Jelikić	–	1	–	1
11	(Socialist Federal Republic of Yugoslavia) Mišo Krstičević	1	–	–	1
11	(Socialist Federal Republic of Yugoslavia) Vlaho Macan	1	–	–	1
11	(Socialist Federal Republic of Yugoslavia) Vedran Rožić	1	–	–	1
	Own goals	1	–	–	1
	TOTALS	53	14	5	71

Source: Competitive matches

== Notes ==
1. Match abandoned for unknown reasons. Therefore, the match was awarded to Velež.

2. 51,723 tickets sold. Estimated 65,000 visitors. Stadium record.

== See also ==
- 1981–82 Yugoslav First League
- 1981–82 Yugoslav Cup

== External sources ==
- 1981–82 Yugoslav First League at rsssf.com
- 1981–82 Yugoslav Cup at rsssf.com
- 1981–82 UEFA Cup at rsssf.com
- 1981–82 Yugoslav First League at historical-lineups.com
