= 1982–83 NK Hajduk Split season =

Hajduk Split
1982–83 season
- Chairman: Ivo Šantić
- Manager: Petar Nadoveza
- First League: 2nd
- Yugoslav Cup: Semi-finals
- UEFA Cup: Second round
- Top goalscorer: League: Dušan Pešić (11); All: Dušan Pešić (12)
- Highest home attendance: 50,000 v Partizan, 19 June 1983
- Lowest home attendance: 3,000 v Budućnost, 10 November 1982

The 1982–83 season was the 72nd season in Hajduk Split’s history and their 37th in the Yugoslav First League. Their 3rd place finish in the 1981–82 season meant it was their 37th successive season playing in the Yugoslav First League.

== Competitions ==
=== Overall ===
Competition	Started round	Final result	First match	Last Match
1982–83 Yugoslav First League	–	2nd	15 August	26 June
1982–83 Yugoslav Cup	First round	Semi-finals	26 October	27 April
1982–83 UEFA Cup	First round	Second round	18 September	3 November

=== Yugoslav First League ===
==== Classification ====
Pos	Team	Pld	W	D	L	GF	GA	GD	Pts	Qualification or relegation
1	Partizan (C)	34	17	11	6	58	37	+21	45	Qualification for European Cup first round
2	Hajduk Split	34	14	15	5	51	33	+18	43	Qualification for UEFA Cup first round
3	Dinamo Zagreb	34	14	15	5	56	40	+16	43	Qualification for Cup Winners' Cup first round
4	Radnički Niš	34	15	10	9	45	39	+6	40	Qualification for UEFA Cup first round
5	Red Star Belgrade	34	13	11	10	55	50	+5	37	Qualification for UEFA Cup first round

Source: rsssf.org
Rules for classification: 1) points; 2) goal difference; 3) number of goals scored.
(C) Champions

==== Results summary ====
Overall								Home						Away					
Pld	W	D	L	GF	GA	GD	Pts	W	D	L	GF	GA	GD	W	D	L	GF	GA	GD
34	14	15	5	51	33	+18	57	10	6	1	33	15	+18	4	9	4	18	18	0

==== Results by round ====
Round	1	2	3	4	5	6	7	8	9	10	11	12	13	14	15	16	17	18	19	20	21	22	23	24	25	26	27	28	29	30	31	32	33	34
Ground	H	A	H	A	H	A	H	A	H	A	H	A	H	A	H	A	H	A	H	A	H	A	H	A	H	A	H	A	H	A	H	A	H	A
Result	D	W	D	D	L	W	D	D	W	D	W	D	D	L	D	L	W	D	W	W	W	L	W	D	D	D	W	D	W	D	W	W	W	L
Position	5	6	8	6	10	9	5	5	4	3	3	3	3	4	4	7	5	6	4	3	3	3	3	3	3	3	3	3	3	3	2	2	2	2

Source: Competitive matches
A = Away; H = Home; W = Win; D = Draw; L = Loss

== Matches ==
=== Yugoslav First League ===
Round	Date	Venue	Opponent	Score	Attendance	Hajduk Scorers
1	15 Aug	H	Velež	1 – 1	18,000	Čop
2	25 Aug	A	Osijek	2 – 0	15,000	Adamović, Pešić
3	29 Aug	H	Sarajevo	1 – 1	22,000	Pešić
4	1 Sep	A	Rijeka	1 – 1	12,000	Pešić
5	5 Sep	H	Vardar	1 – 3	14,000	Krstičević
6	12 Sep	A	Vojvodina	2 – 1	10,000	Jerolimov, Adamović
7	19 Sep	H	Galenika	1 – 1	10,000	Gudelj
8	25 Sep	A	OFK Beograd	0 – 0	2,000	
9	3 Oct	H	Radnički Niš	4 – 1	9,000	Bogdanović, Gudelj, Šalov, Pešić
10	6 Oct	A	Dinamo Vinkovci	1 – 1	10,000	Jerolimov
11	16 Oct	H	Željezničar	2 – 0	7,000	Jerolimov (2)
12	24 Oct	A	Olimpija	1 – 1	7,000	Miljuš
13	30 Oct	H	Dinamo Zagreb	2 – 2	40,000	Pešić, Gudelj
14	6 Nov	A	Budućnost	0 – 1	4,000	
15	21 Nov	H	Red Star	0 – 0	15,000	
16	28 Nov	A	Partizan	0 – 2	20,000	
17	5 Dec	H	Sloboda	3 – 1	4,000	Adamović, Šalov, Gudelj
18	6 Mar	A	Velež	0 – 0	12,000	
19	13 Mar	H	Osijek	2 – 1	12,000	Pešić, Šalov
20	20 Mar	A	Sarajevo	3 – 1	20,000	Bogdanović (2), Šušnjara
21	27 Mar	H	Rijeka	1 – 0	8,000	Šalov
22	2 Apr	A	Vardar	1 – 2	8,000	Bogdanović
23	10 Apr	H	Vojvodina	3 – 0	12,000	Šalov (2), Adamović
24	14 Apr	A	Galenika	1 – 1	1,000	Pešić
25	17 Apr	H	OFK Beograd	1 – 1	8,000	Čelić
26	30 Apr	A	Radnički Niš	1 – 1	5,000	Bogdanović
27	8 May	H	Dinamo Vinkovci	4 – 2	14,000	Krstičević (2), Pešić, Adamović
28	15 May	A	Željezničar	2 – 2	10,000	Pešić, Bogdanović
29	22 May	H	Olimpija	2 – 0	9,000	Cukrov, Pešić
30	29 May	A	Dinamo Zagreb	1 – 1	50,000	Zo. Vujović
31	4 Jun	H	Budućnost	4 – 1	9,000	Zo. Vujović (2), Vulić, Pešić
32	12 Jun	A	Red Star	2 – 1	25,000	Zo. Vujović (2)
33	19 Jun	H	Partizan	1 – 0	50,000	Zo. Vujović
34	26 Jun	A	Sloboda	0 – 1	6,000	

Sources: hajduk.hr

=== Yugoslav Cup ===
Round	Date	Venue	Opponent	Score	Attendance	Hajduk Scorers
R1	26 Oct	A	Garnizon JNA Raška	1 – 1 (8 – 7 p)	3,000	Mehmedalić
R2	10 Nov	H	Budućnost	5 – 0	3,000	Jerolimov (2), Krstičević (2), Gudelj
QF	23 Mar	A	OFK Beograd	2 – 0	6,000	Šalov (2)
SF	27 Apr	A	Sarajevo	0 – 1	18,000	

Sources: hajduk.hr

=== UEFA Cup ===
Round	Date	Venue	Opponent	Score	Attendance	Hajduk Scorers
R1	22 Sep	A (Malta)	Żurrieq (Malta)	4 – 1	3,127	Pešić, Adamović, Gudelj, Macan
R1	29 Sep	H	Żurrieq (Malta)	4 – 0	5,000	Jerolimov (2), Cukrov (2)
R2	20 Oct	H	Bordeaux (France)	4 – 1	45,400	Bogdanović, Jerolimov, Šalov, Cukrov
R2	3 Nov	A (France)	Bordeaux (France)	0 – 4	20,000	

Source: hajduk.hr

== Player seasonal records ==
=== Top scorers ===
Rank	Name	League	Europe	Cup	Total
1	(Socialist Federal Republic of Yugoslavia) Dušan Pešić	11	1	–	12
2	(Socialist Federal Republic of Yugoslavia) Ive Jerolimov	4	3	2	9
2	(Socialist Federal Republic of Yugoslavia) Nenad Šalov	6	1	2	9
4	(Socialist Federal Republic of Yugoslavia) Mladen Bogdanović	6	1	–	7
5	(Socialist Federal Republic of Yugoslavia) Zoran Vujović	6	–	–	6
5	(Socialist Federal Republic of Yugoslavia) Zdenko Adamović	5	1	–	6
7	(Socialist Federal Republic of Yugoslavia) Ivan Gudelj	4	1	–	5
7	(Socialist Federal Republic of Yugoslavia) Mišo Krstičević	3	–	2	5
9	(Socialist Federal Republic of Yugoslavia) Nikica Cukrov	1	3	–	4
10	(Socialist Federal Republic of Yugoslavia) Dragutin Čelić	1	–	–	1
10	(Socialist Federal Republic of Yugoslavia) Davor Čop	1	–	–	1
10	(Socialist Federal Republic of Yugoslavia) Vlaho Macan	–	1	–	1
10	(Socialist Federal Republic of Yugoslavia) Esad Mehmedalić	–	–	1	1
10	(Socialist Federal Republic of Yugoslavia) Branko Miljuš	1	–	–	1
10	(Socialist Federal Republic of Yugoslavia) Goran Šušnjara	1	–	–	1
10	(Socialist Federal Republic of Yugoslavia) Zoran Vulić	1	–	–	1
	TOTALS	51	8	12	71

Source: Competitive matches

== See also ==
- 1982–83 Yugoslav First League
- 1982–83 Yugoslav Cup

== External sources ==
- 1982–83 Yugoslav First League at rsssf.com
- 1982–83 Yugoslav Cup at rsssf.com
- 1982–83 UEFA Cup at rsssf.com
- 1982–83 Yugoslav First League at historical-lineups.com
