= List of HNK Hajduk Split seasons =

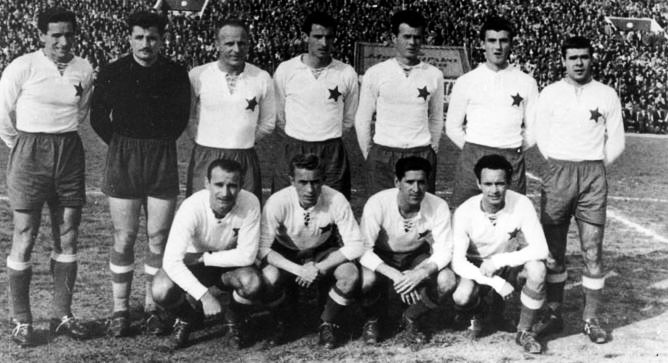
Champions of the 1954–55 Yugoslav First League season Standing (left to right): Kokeza, Beara, Matošić, D. Grčić, Rebac, Vidošević, Šenauer; squatting: Luštica, Vukas, Broketa and L. Grčić

Hrvatski nogometni klub Hajduk Split, an association football club based in Split, was founded in February 1911. For the first nine years of their existence, there was no league football, so matches were arranged on a friendly level, supplemented by cup competitions organised at local and national level except during the World War I. In 1920, Hajduk played in the first championship of Split football subassociation. From 1923, Hajduk participated in first club competition on a national level for clubs from Kingdom of Yugoslavia organized in various cup and league formats. They won two titles, in 1927 and 1929.

After World War II, Hajduk soon established themselves as one of the so-called "Big Four" of Yugoslav football (along with Dinamo Zagreb, Partizan and Red Star), a quartet of teams who dominated in SFR Yugoslavia, by winning three league titles (1950, 1952 and 1955) in first ten years. The following fifteen years were less successful and the only trophy that Hajduk won was their first Yugoslav Cup title in 1967. The final was played at their home stadium Stari plac; it was the only single legged final played outside Belgrade in the history of the cup. The club's most successful period was between 1970 and 1980, during which they won three league titles and five consecutive Yugoslav Cups, all of them but one cup under the guidance of manager Tomislav Ivić. The club also had successful campaigns in the European Cup during this period, reaching the quarter-finals twice, their best result in the club's history. They also reached the semi-finals of the 1972–73 European Cup Winners' Cup, being eliminated by Leeds United. Hajduk were never relegated from top level until leaving the league in 1991 following Croatia's independence. During the Yugoslav era Hajduk won seven league titles and nine Yugoslav Cups. In the Yugoslav era four Hajduk players were top league scorers on five occasions: Frane Matošić in 1949 (who is the best goalscorer in the history of the club), Bernard Vukas in 1955, Petar Nadoveza in 1966 and 1971, and Zlatko Vujović in 1985.

Following the 1990–91 Yugoslav First League, Croatian clubs abandoned the league amid the breakup of Yugoslavia and joined the present-day Croatian football league system as the country declared independence. Hajduk Split were thus founding members of the Prva HNL. In the first four years of the Prva HNL, Hajduk became far more successful than rivals from Zagreb, winning three league titles and two Croatian Cups, as well reaching the Champions League quarter-finals. In the following twenty years Hajduk stood in the shadow of Dinamo Zagreb, winning only three league and four cup titles.

== Kingdom of Serbs, Croats and Slovenes/Kingdom of Yugoslavia (1920–1940) ==
Season	Division	Pld	W	D	L	GF	GA	Ran/Pts	Pos	Cup	Competition	Round	Player(s)	Goals
Season	League									Cup	Other competitions		Top league goalscorer(s)	
1920	—	—	—	—	—	—	—	—	—	—N/a	Split Subassociation	RU	—	—
1921	—	—	—	—	—	—	—	—	—	—N/a	Split Subassociation	W	—	—
1922	—	—	—	—	—	—	—	—	—	—N/a	Split Subassociation	W	—	—
1923	Div 1	1	0	0	1	3	4	QF	4th	—N/a	Split Subassociation	W	Jaroslav Bohata; Mirko Machiedo; Miroslav Kurir	1
1924	Div 1	4	2	1	1	16	6	F	2nd	RU	Split Subassociation	W	Ante Bonačić	5
1925	Div 1	1	0	0	1	2	3	QF	5th	RU	Split Subassociation	W	Ljubo Benčić; Mirko Bonačić	1
1926	Div 1	2	1	0	1	2	7	SF	3rd	QF	Split Subassociation	W	Ljubo Benčić; Leo Lemešić; Marko Markovina	1
1927	Div 1	5	4	0	1	15	6	8	1st	—N/a	Split Subassociation Mitropa Cup	W QF	Ante Bonačić; Vinko Radić	4
1928	Div 1	5	2	2	1	13	7	6	2nd	—N/a	Split Subassociation	W	Ljubomir Benčić	7
1929	Div 1	8	5	2	1	25	15	12	1st	—N/a	Split Subassociation	W	Ljubo Benčić	13
1930	Div 1	10	5	3	2	21	17	9	3rd	—N/a	Split Subassociation	W	Leo Lemešić	7
1930–31	Div 1	10	3	3	4	13	16	9	4th	—N/a			Leo Lemešić; Vladimir Kragić	12
1931–32	Div 1	6	2	2	2	10	4	F	2nd	—N/a	Split Subassociation	W	Leo Lemešić	10
1932–33	Div 1	20	13	2	5	41	19	28	4th	—N/a			Vladimir Kragić	21
1934–35	Div 1	18	7	4	7	47	32	18	6th	—N/a			Leo Lemešić	18
1935–36	—	—	—	—	—	—	—	—	—	—N/a	Split Subassociation	W	—	—
1936–37	Div 1	18	9	3	6	47	39	22	2nd	—N/a			Frane Matošić	12
1937–38	Div 1	18	6	5	7	31	38	17	7th	—N/a			Leo Lemešić; Vladimir Kragić	6
1938–39	Div 1	22	11	5	6	51	30	27	4th	QF			Frane Matošić	17
1939–40	Div 1	10	1	3	6	14	29	5	5th	—N/a			Ivo Radovniković	13

== Banovina of Croatia/PR Croatia (1940–1941/1946) ==
Season	Division	Pld	W	D	L	GF	GA	Pts	Pos	Cup	Competition	Round	Player(s)	Goals
Season	League									Cup	Other competitions		Top league goalscorer(s)	
1940–41	Div 1	18	14	3	1	75	17	31	1st	QF			Ratko Kacijan	17
1946	Div 1	16	14	2	2	51	11	22	1st	—N/a			Frane Matošić	13

== FPR Yugoslavia/SFR Yugoslavia (1946–1991) ==
Season	Division	Pld	W	D^{[A]}	L	GF	GA	Pts	Pos	Cup	Competition	Round	Player(s)	Goals
Season	League									Cup	Other competitions		Top league goalscorer(s)	
1946–47	Div 1	26	16	4	6	57	21	36	4th	—N/a			Frane Matošić	16
1947–48	Div 1	18	11	2	5	40	15	24	2nd	R16			Frane Matošić	14
1948–49	Div 1	18	10	5	3	41	20	25	3rd	R16 | QF			Frane Matošić	16
1950	Div 1	18	10	8	0	28	13	28	1st	SF			Frane Matošić	7
1951	Div 1	22	14	4	4	52	21	32	3rd	SF			Frane Matošić	14
1952	Div 1	16	10	1	5	35	15	21	1st^{[B]}	—N/a			Bernard Vukas	8
1952–53	Div 1	22	11	7	4	49	35	29	2nd	QF			Bernard Vukas	12
1953–54	Div 1	26	16	3	7	55	34	35	4th	RU			Bernard Vukas	12
1954–55	Div 1	26	16	6	4	69	27	38	1st	SF			Bernard Vukas	20
1955–56	Div 1	26	9	5	12	52	39	23	12th	RU	Mitropa Cup^{[C]}	QF	Bernard Vukas	13
1956–57	Div 1	26	12	6	8	45	31	30	3rd	R32			Zlatko Papec; Sulejman Rebac	9
1957–58	Div 1	26	10	5	11	42	43	25	9th	SF			Joško Vidošević	11
1958–59	Div 1	22	7	7	8	33	35	21	7th	R16			Joško Vidošević	8
1959–60	Div 1	22	10	6	6	47	26	26	5th	SF			Andrija Anković	17
1960–61	Div 1	22	13	4	5	34	22	30	3rd	SF	Mitropa Cup	—^{[D]}	Andrija Anković	15
1961–62	Div 1	22	8	8	6	30	30	24	5th	R16			Zvonko Bego	10
1962–63	Div 1	26	9	5	12	26	43	23	11th	RU			Andrija Anković; Zlatko Papec	5
1963–64	Div 1	26	9	5	12	44	44	23	10th	R16	Intertoto Cup	GS	Andrija Anković; Ivica Hlevnjak	14
1964–65	Div 1	28	7	9	12	28	39	23	12th	R16			Petar Nadoveza	5
1965–66	Div 1	30	11	8	11	45	37	25^{[E]}	13th	R16			Petar Nadoveza	21
1966–67	Div 1	30	12	7	11	43	28	31	7th	W			Zlatomir Obradov	7
1967–68	Div 1	30	12	10	8	44	37	34	4th	R2	Cup Winners' Cup	R1	Petar Nadoveza	14
1968–69	Div 1	34	11	16	7	47	38	38	6th	RU	Mitropa Cup	R1	Petar Nadoveza	10
1969–70	Div 1	34	16	5	13	51	37	37	7th	QF	Mitropa Cup	QF	Jurica Jerković	11
1970–71	Div 1	34	18	13	3	61	31	49	1st	R16	Inter-Cities Fairs Cup	R2	Petar Nadoveza	20
1971–72	Div 1	34	12	7	15	45	56	31	10th	W	European Cup	R1	Jurica Jerković	9
1972–73	Div 1	34	14	3	17	50	50	31	9th	—N/a	Cup Winners' Cup	SF	Petar Nadoveza	19
1973–74	Div 1	34	18	9	7	52	24	45	1st	W	—^{[F]}	—	Slaviša Žungul	12
1974–75	Div 1	34	20	8	6	56	29	48	1st	W	European Cup	R2	Slaviša Žungul	15
1975–76	Div 1	34	19	11	4	57	22	49	2nd	W	European Cup	QF	Slaviša Žungul	14
1976–77	Div 1	34	12	9	13	41	35	33	8th	W	Cup Winners' Cup	R2	Slaviša Žungul	14
1977–78	Div 1	34	14	11	9	49	37	39	3rd	QF	Cup Winners' Cup	QF	Slaviša Žungul	15
1978–79	Div 1	34	20	10	4	62	28	50	1st	R32	UEFA Cup	R2	Slaviša Žungul	12
1979–80	Div 1	34	15	8	11	53	44	38	5th	R32	European Cup	QF	Zlatko Vujović	10
1980–81	Div 1	34	16	10	8	57	36	42	2nd	R32			Zlatko Vujović	12
1981–82	Div 1	34	17	10	7	53	31	44	3rd	QF	UEFA Cup	R3	Zlatko Vujović	14
1982–83	Div 1	34	14	15	5	51	33	43	2nd	SF	UEFA Cup	R2	Dušan Pešić	11
1983–84	Div 1	34	12	15	7	39	22	39	5th	W	UEFA Cup	SF	Zlatko Vujović	9
1984–85	Div 1	34	16	12	6	65	42	44	2nd	QF	Cup Winners' Cup	R1	Zlatko Vujović	25
1985–86	Div 1	34	15	7	12	55	44	37	4th	R16	UEFA Cup	QF	Zlatko Vujović	17
1986–87	Div 1	34	14	8	12	41	41	36	8th	W	UEFA Cup	R3	Stjepan Deverić	10
1987–88	Div 1	34	8	14	12	40	50	30	13th	R16	Cup Winners' Cup	R2	Miloš Bursać	10
1988–89	Div 1	34	15	10 (6)	9	50	29	36	3rd	R32			Branko Karačić	9
1989–90	Div 1	34	18	3 (2)	13	50	35	38	3rd	RU	—^{[G]}	—	Aljoša Asanović	14
1990–91	Div 1	36	15	9 (3)	12	49	38	33	6th	W	—^{[G]}	—	Robert Jarni	8

== Croatia (1992–present) ==
Season	Division	Pld	W	D	L	GF	GA	Pts	PPG	Pos	Cup	Competition	Round	Player(s)	Goals
Season	League										Cup	Other competitions		Top league goalscorer(s)	
1992	1. HNL	22	16	4	2	44	14	36	1.64	1st	QF	Cup Winners' Cup	R1	Ardian Kozniku	12
1992–93	1. HNL	30	16	10	4	53	27	42	1.40	2nd	W	—^{[H]}	—	Ardian Kozniku	14
1993–94	1. HNL	34	22	6	6	84	36	50	1.47	1st	SF	Cup Winners' Cup	R1	Tomislav Erceg	18
1994–95	1. HNL	30	19	8	3	68	26	65	2.17	1st	W	Champions League	QF	Tomislav Erceg	17
1995–96	1. HNL	32	19	7	6	66	33	64	2.00	2nd	R2	Champions League	QR	Nenad Pralija	17
1996–97	1. HNL	30	18	6	6	53	22	60	2.00	2nd	QF	UEFA Cup	QR	Jurica Vučko	15
1997–98	1. HNL	32	17	6	9	53	36	57	1.78	2nd	SF	UEFA Cup	R1	Tomislav Erceg	11
1998–99	1. HNL	32	17	9	6	62	32	60	1.86	3rd	SF	UEFA Cup	R1	Zvonimir Deranja	14
1999–2000	1. HNL	33	17	10	6	58	30	61	1.85	2nd	W	UEFA Cup	R1	Mate Baturina	13
2000–01	1. HNL	32	20	6	6	66	23	66	2.06	1st	RU	Champions League	QR2	Stanko Bubalo	14
2001–02	1. HNL	30	20	5	5	61	28	65	2.17	2nd	QF	Champions League UEFA Cup	QR3 R1	Tomislav Erceg	13
2002–03	1. HNL	32	22	4	6	56	22	70	2.19	2nd	W	UEFA Cup	R1	Petar Krpan	10
2003–04	1. HNL	32	25	3	4	63	24	78	2.44	1st	QF	UEFA Cup	R2	Petar Krpan	12
2004–05	1. HNL	32	16	8	8	58	33	56	1.75	1st	RU	Champions League	QR2	Tomislav Bušić	11
2005–06	1. HNL	32	10	10	12	40	35	40	1.25	5th	SF	Champions League	QR2	Niko Kranjčar	10
2006–07	1. HNL	33	22	6	5	60	25	72	2.18	2nd	SF			Mladen Bartolović; Tomislav Bušić	11
2007–08	1. HNL	33	14	10	9	57	41	52	1.58	5th	RU	UEFA Cup	QR2	Nikola Kalinić	17
2008–09	1. HNL	33	21	5	7	59	25	68	2.06	2nd	RU	UEFA Cup	QR2	Nikola Kalinić	15
2009–10	1. HNL	30	17	7	6	50	21	58	1.93	2nd	W	Europa League	QR3	Senijad Ibričić	17
2010–11	1. HNL	30	16	7	7	54	32	55	1.83	2nd	R2	Europa League	GS	Ante Vukušić	14
2011–12	1. HNL	30	16	6	8	50	24	54	1.80	2nd	QF	Europa League	QR3	Ante Vukušić	12
2012–13	1. HNL	33	14	10	9	45	31	52	1.58	4th	W	Europa League	QR3	Mijo Caktaš; Ivan Vuković	9
2013–14	1. HNL	36	17	11	8	58	44	62	1.72	3rd	QF	Europa League	QR3	Anton Maglica	12
2014–15	1. HNL	36	15	8	13	59	56	50^{[I]}	1.39	3rd	SF	Europa League	PO	Mijo Caktaš; Sandro Gotal	9
2015–16	1. HNL	36	17	10	9	46	28	61	1.69	3rd	SF	Europa League	PO	Tino-Sven Sušić	12
2016–17	1. HNL	36	20	9	7	70	31	69	1.92	3rd	QF	Europa League	PO	Márkó Futács	18
2017–18	1. HNL	36	19	9	8	70	38	66	1.83	3rd	RU	Europa League	PO	Said Ahmed Said	11
2018–19	1. HNL	36	17	11	8	59	39	62	1.72	4th	QF	Europa League	QR3	Mijo Caktaš	19
2019–20	1. HNL	36	18	6	12	60	41	60	1.67	5th	R2	Europa League	QR1	Mijo Caktaš	20
2020–21	1. HNL	36	18	6	12	48	37	60	1.67	4th	QF	Europa League	QR3	Mijo Caktaš	9
2021–22	1. HNL	36	21	9	6	64	31	72	2.00	2nd	W	Europa Conference League	QR2	Marko Livaja	28
2022–23	HNL	36	21	8	7	65	41	71	1.97	2nd	W	Europa Conference League	PO	Marko Livaja	19
2023–24	HNL	36	21	5	10	54	26	68	1.89	3rd	SF	Europa Conference League	QR3	Marko Livaja	10
2024–25	HNL	36	17	12	7	49	34	63	1.36	3rd	QF	Conference League	QR3	Marko Livaja	19
2025–26	HNL	36	20	8	8	61	36	68	1.89	2nd	QF	Conference League	QR3	Michele Šego	11

== Notes ==
- ^{A} Between the 1988–89 and 1990–91 season drawn games went to penalties with only the shootout winners gaining a point. Figures in brackets in the drawn games column represent points won in such shootouts.
- ^{B} The 1952 Yugoslav First League was shortened and completed over a period of three and a half months, beginning on 2 March and ending on 22 June. The reason for the changes was a desire to start the next season in the fall of 1952, thus implementing the fall–spring format that had become a norm all across Europe by this time. The clubs were initially divided into two groups of six teams each, where everyone within a given group played each other twice (home and away). After ten rounds Hajduk finished second in their group and qualified for the four-team championship group in the second stage in which four best-placed teams from preliminary groups played each other twice. Eventually Hajduk finished first, one point ahead of Red Star. The statistics for the 1952 season thus show season totals and not just the final standings in the second stage group.
- ^{C} Although Hajduk won the 1954–55 championship, the Football Association of Yugoslavia sent Hajduk as the champions to the Mitropa Cup, while fifth-placed Partizan was chosen to participate in the inaugural European Cup.
- ^{D} Tournament was played with five participating countries having 6 teams each playing two-legged ties. The final classification was given only by countries with Yugoslavia finishing second behind Hungary. Hajduk defeated Bologna 3–1 away and 1–0 in Split.
- ^{E} At the beginning of 1964–65 season, Hajduk Split, Željezničar and Trešnjevka were found guilty of match-fixing back in the 1963–64 season. Their guilt was based on the written statement by Željezničar goalkeeper Ranko Planinić and his testimony erupted in a nationwide scandal that became known as the Planinić Affair. On 27 August 1965, the Yugoslav FA's disciplinary body ruled that Hajduk Split, Željezničar and Trešnjevka are to be relegated to the Yugoslav Second League. After appeal, the main punishment for the three clubs was reduced to points-deduction and Hajduk received a five-point deduction.
- ^{F} As the Yugoslav Cup final was moved to November 1973, the cup was held in a single year, so the 1971–72 cup runners-up Dinamo Zagreb entered the 1973–74 European Cup Winners' Cup.
- ^{G} Hajduk Split were banned from European competitions for two years after crowd trouble during the return leg of the 1987–88 European Cup Winners' Cup second round match against Marseille, which Hajduk won 2–0 but was later awarded 3–0 to Marseille.
- ^{H} Hajduk Split could not enter European competitions in the following 1992–93 season as the Croatian Football Federation, the league's governing body, wasn't yet recognized by UEFA and officially became its affiliate as late as June 1993.
- ^{I} Hajduk Split were deducted three points, due to not showing up in the derby match against Dinamo Zagreb in the 16th round.
