= 1979–80 NK Hajduk Split season =

Hajduk Split
1978–79 season
- Chairman: Tito Kirigin; Ante Skataretiko
- Manager: Tomislav Ivić
- First League: 5th
- Yugoslav Cup: First round
- European Cup: Quarter-finals
- Top goalscorer: League: Zlatko Vujović (10); All: Zlatko Vujović (12)
- Highest home attendance: 52,500 v Trabzonspor, 19 September 1979
- Lowest home attendance: 2,500 v Budućnost, 2 September 1979

The 1979–80 season was the 65th season in Hajduk Split's history and their 34th season in the Yugoslav First League. Their 1st-place finish in the 1978–79 season meant it was their 34th successive season playing in the Yugoslav First League.

== Competitions ==
=== Overall ===
Competition	Started round	Final result	First match	Last Match
1979–80 Yugoslav First League	–	1st	15 July	29 June
1979–80 Yugoslav Cup	First round		17 September	
1979–80 European Cup	First round	Quarter-finals	19 September	19 March

=== Yugoslav First League ===
==== Classification ====
Pos	Team	Pld	W	D	L	GF	GA	GD	Pts	Qualification or relegation
3	Radnički Niš	34	14	11	9	49	32	+17	39	Qualification for UEFA Cup first round
4	Napredak Kruševac	34	13	13	8	41	27	+14	39	Qualification for UEFA Cup first round
5	Hajduk Split	34	15	8	11	53	44	+9	38	
6	Sloboda Tuzla	34	13	9	12	44	37	+7	35	
7	Vardar	34	10	15	9	43	41	+2	35	

Source: rsssf.org
Rules for classification: 1) points; 2) goal difference; 3) number of goals scored.

==== Results summary ====
Overall								Home						Away					
Pld	W	D	L	GF	GA	GD	Pts	W	D	L	GF	GA	GD	W	D	L	GF	GA	GD
34	15	8	11	55	44	+11	53	11	4	2	38	16	+22	4	4	9	17	28	−11

==== Results by round ====
Round	1	2	3	4	5	6	7	8	9	10	11	12	13	14	15	16	17	18	19	20	21	22	23	24	25	26	27	28	29	30	31	32	33	34
Ground	H	A	H	A	H	A	H	A	H	H	A	H	A	H	A	H	A	A	H	A	H	A	H	A	H	A	A	H	A	H	A	H	A	H
Result	W	L	W	L	W	W	D	W	W	D	L	D	W	W	L	W	L	D	W	D	W	W	D	D	L	L	L	L	L	W	D	W	L	W
Position	4	12	8	8	5	3	4	2	3	2	5	6	5	4	6	4	4	5	4	3	2	3	3	2	3	5	5	5	5	5	5	5	5	5

Source: Competitive matches
A = Away; H = Home; W = Win; D = Draw; L = Loss

== Matches ==
=== First League ===
Round	Date	Venue	Opponent	Score	Attendance	Hajduk Scorers
1	15 Jul	H	Osijek	2–1	15,000	Čop, Đorđević
2	21 Jul	A	Sloboda	1–3	6,000	Krstičević
3	29 Jul	H	Borac Banja Luka	2–2	20,000	Čop (2), Đorđević
4	1 Aug	A	Velež	1–2	35,000	Đorđević
5	5 Aug	H	Olimpija	3–0	20,000	Čop, Šalov, Zo. Vujović
6	12 Aug	A	Vojvodina	4–1	15,000	Šalov, Krstičević, Šurjak, Primorac
7	19 Aug	H	Željezničar	2–2	20,000	Zl. Vujović, Primorac
8	26 Aug	A	Red Star	1–0	75,000	Zl. Vujović
9	1 Sep	H	Budućnost	1–0	6,000	Krstičević
10	5 Sep	H	Dinamo Zagreb	1–1	30,000	Krstičević
11	8 Sep	A	Radnički Niš	0–4	10,000	
12	7 Oct	H	Vardar	0–0	25,000	
13	14 Oct	A	Čelik Zenica	3–1	17,000	Đorđević (2), Krstičević
14	20 Oct	H	Napredak Kruševac	3–1	15,000	Primorac, Zl. Vujović, Bogdanović
15	3 Nov	A	Rijeka	0–2	15,000	
16	18 Nov	H	Sarajevo	1–0	20,000	Šurjak
17	25 Nov	A	Partizan	0–3	20,000	
18	1 Mar	A	Osijek	0–0	15,000	
19	8 Mar	H	Sloboda	2–1	7,000	Zl. Vujović (2)
20	12 Mar	A	Borac Banja Luka	0–0	16,000	
22	6 Apr	A	Olimpija	1–0	20,000	Đorđević
21	9 Apr	H	Velež	2–0	20,000	Primorac (2)
23	13 Apr	H	Vojvodina	2–2	15,000	Zo. Vujović, Primorac
24	20 Apr	A	Željezničar	1–1	10,000	Krstičević
26	11 May	A	Dinamo Zagreb	0–1	45,000	
27	15 May	A	Budućnost	1–3	4,000	Gudelj
25	21 May^{1}	H	Red Star	1–3	40,000	Maričić
28	25 May	H	Radnički Niš	2–3	10,000	Đorđević, Maričić
29	1 Jun	A	Vardar	0–1	12,000	
30	4 Jun	H	Čelik	3–0	7,000	Zo. Vujović, Zl. Vujović (2)
31	7 Jun	A	Napredak Kruševac	2–2	8,000	Zl. Vujović (2)
32	15 Jun	H	Rijeka	4–1	8,000	Gudelj, Zl. Vujović (2), Krstičević
33	22 Jun	A	Sarajevo	2–4	12,000	Vidaković (o.g.), Krstičević
34	29 Jun	H	Partizan	4–1	15,000	Đorđević, Mužinić, Primorac (2)

Source: hajduk.hr

=== Yugoslav Cup ===
Round	Date	Venue	Opponent	Score	Attendance	Hajduk Scorers
R1	17 Sep	A	Partizan	1–2	35,000	Bogdanović

Sources: hajduk.hr

=== European Cup ===
Round	Date	Venue	Opponent	Score	Attendance	Hajduk Scorers
R1	19 Sep	H	Trabzonspor (Turkey)	1–0	52,500	Primorac
R1	3 Oct	A (Turkey)	Trabzonspor (Turkey)	1–0	25,000	Đorđević
R2	24 Oct	A (Denmark)	Vejle (Denmark)	3–0	6,500	Šurjak, Krstičević, Šalov
R2	7 Nov	H	Vejle (Denmark)	1–2	20,787	Zl. Vujović
QF	5 Mar	A (West Germany)	HSV (West Germany)	0–1	52,000	
QF	19 Mar	H	HSV (West Germany)	3–2	52,000	Zl. Vujović, Đorđević, Primorac

Source: hajduk.hr

== Player seasonal records ==
=== Top scorers ===
Rank	Name	League	Europe	Cup	Total
1	(Socialist Federal Republic of Yugoslavia) Zlatko Vujović	10	2	–	12
2	(Socialist Federal Republic of Yugoslavia) Boro Primorac	8	2	–	11
3	(Socialist Federal Republic of Yugoslavia) Boriša Đorđević	7	2	–	9
3	(Socialist Federal Republic of Yugoslavia) Mišo Krstičević	8	1	–	9
5	(Socialist Federal Republic of Yugoslavia) Zoran Vujović	5	–	–	5
6	(Socialist Federal Republic of Yugoslavia) Boriša Đorđević	4	–	–	4
6	(Socialist Federal Republic of Yugoslavia) Davor Čop	4	–	–	4
8	(Socialist Federal Republic of Yugoslavia) Nenad Šalov	2	1	–	3
8	(Socialist Federal Republic of Yugoslavia) Ivica Šurjak	2	1	–	3
10	(Socialist Federal Republic of Yugoslavia) Mladen Bogdanović	1	–	1	2
10	(Socialist Federal Republic of Yugoslavia) Ivan Gudelj	2	–	–	2
10	(Socialist Federal Republic of Yugoslavia) Damir Maričić	2	–	–	2
13	(Socialist Federal Republic of Yugoslavia) Dražen Mužinić	1	–	–	1
	Own goals	1	–	–	1
	TOTALS	53	9	1	63

Source: Competitive matches

== See also ==
- 1979–80 Yugoslav First League
- 1979–80 Yugoslav Cup

== Notes ==
1. On 4 May, the match was abandoned in 41st minute, due to the death of Josip Broz Tito. Therefore, the match was voided and was replayed on 21 May.

== External sources ==
- 1979–80 Yugoslav First League at rsssf.com
- 1979–80 Yugoslav Cup at rsssf.com
- 1979–80 European Cup at rsssf.com
- 1979–80 Yugoslav First League at historical-lineups.com
