= HNK Hajduk Split in European football =

Croatian club in European football

Hajduk Split in European football
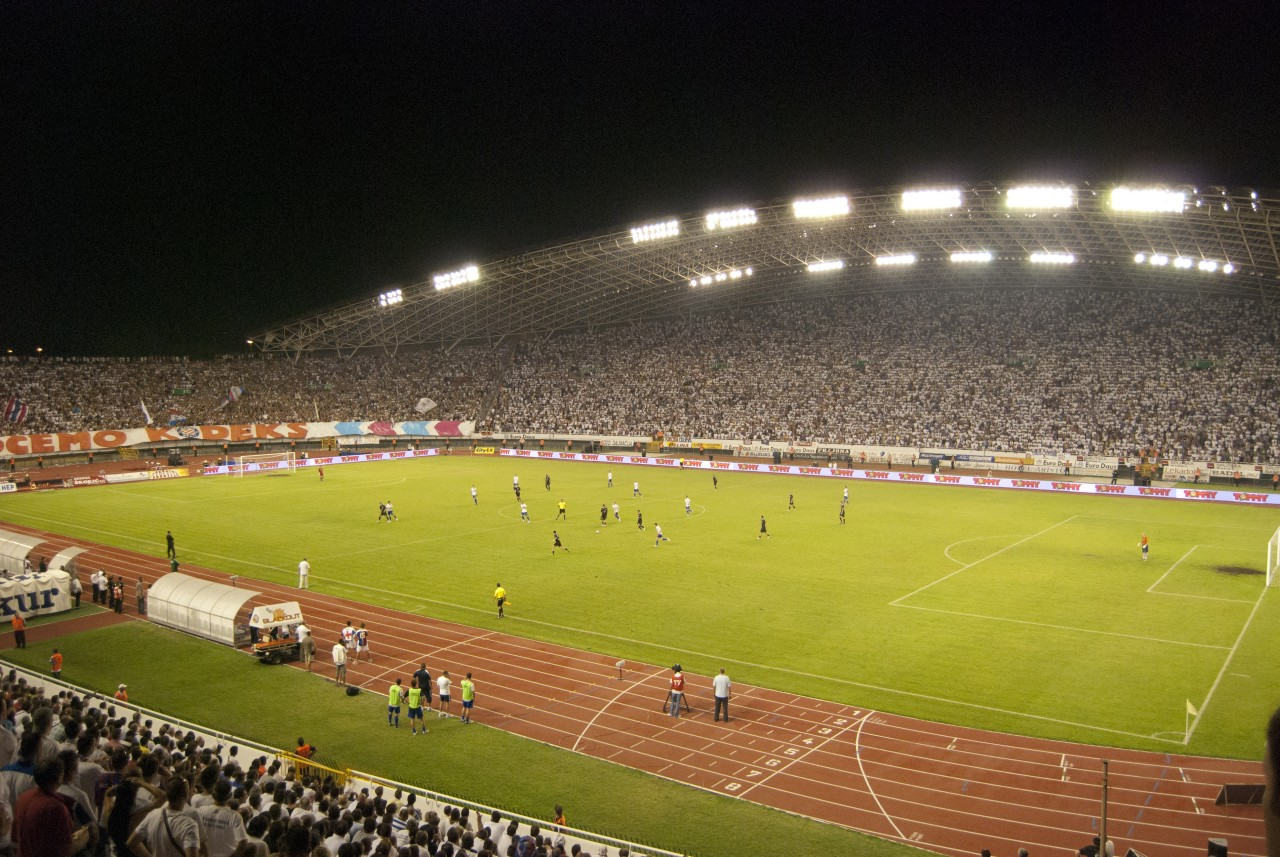
- The match between Hajduk Split and Unirea Urziceni in Stadion Poljud for the 2010–11 UEFA Europa League play-off round.
- Club: Hajduk Split
- Seasons played: 50
- First entry: 1927 Mitropa Cup
- Latest entry: 2026–27 UEFA Europa League

This is the list of all HNK Hajduk Split's European football competitions.

== Summary ==
=== By competition ===
Competition	Pld	W	D	L	GF	GA	Last season played
European Cup / UEFA Champions League	40	18	10	12	58	47	2005–06
UEFA Cup / UEFA Europa League	134	60	26	48	206	147	2026–27
UEFA Europa Conference League	17	6	4	7	21	24	2026–27
UEFA Cup Winners' Cup	30	10	3	17	31	46	1993–94
Inter-Cities Fairs Cup	4	2	0	2	5	4	1970–71
Rappan Cup	6	3	0	3	7	8	1963–64
Mitropa Cup	12	5	3	4	17	27	1969–70
Total	242	100	42	90	339	293	

Source: UEFA.com, Last updated on 27 August 2022. after match Hajduk - Villarreal 0:2
Pld = Matches played; W = Matches won; D = Matches drawn; L = Matches lost; GF = Goals for; GA = Goals against. Defunct competitions indicated in italics.
Notes: This summary includes matches played in the Inter-Cities Fairs Cup, which was not endorsed by UEFA and is not counted in UEFA's official European statistics.

=== By result ===
Overall	Pld	W	D	L	GF	GA	GD
Home^{1}	114	71	18	25	205	101	+104
Away	117	29	24	64	130	188	–58
Total	231	100	42	89	335	289	+46

Last updated: 27 August 2022. after match Hajduk - Villarreal 0:2 ^{1} Includes seven matches where Hajduk played as hosts away from their home stadium:

- 1984–85 Cup Winners' Cup first-round game against Dynamo Moscow (2–5 loss) played in Osijek, Croatia on 3 October 1984
- 1991–92 Cup Winners' Cup first-round game against Tottenham (1–0 win) played in Linz, Austria on 17 September 1991
- 1993–94 Cup Winners' Cup first-round game against Ajax (1–0 win) played in Ljubljana, Slovenia on 17 September 1993
- 1995–96 Champions League qualifying round game against Panathinaikos (1–1 draw) played in Rijeka, Croatia on 23 August 1995
- 1999–2000 qualifying round game against Dudelange (5–0 win) played in Varaždin, Croatia on 12 August 1999
- 2015–16 Europa League first qualifying round game against Sillamäe Kalev (6–2 win) played in Dugopolje, Croatia on 9 July 2015
- 2017–18 Europa League second qualifying round game against Levski Sofia (1–0 win) played in Dugopolje, Croatia on 13 July 2017

== Matches ==
Season	Competition	Round	Opponent	Home	Away	Agg.
1927	Mitropa Cup	QF	(Austria) Rapid Wien	0–1	1–8	1–9
1955–56	Mitropa Cup	QF	(Hungary) Vörös Lobogó	3–2	0–6	3–8
1960–61	Mitropa Cup	–	(Italy) Bologna	1–0	3–1	2nd out of 5^{2}
1963–64	Rappan Cup	Group; C4	(East Germany) Motor Zwickau	2–1	3–2	3rd out of 4
1963–64	Rappan Cup	Group; C4	(Czechoslovakia) SONP Kladno	1–2	0–2	3rd out of 4
1963–64	Rappan Cup	Group; C4	(Poland) Odra Opole	1–0	0–1	3rd out of 4
1967–68	Cup Winners' Cup	R1	(England) Tottenham Hotspur	0–2	3–4	3–6
1968–69	Mitropa Cup	R16	(Czechoslovakia) Baník Ostrava	2–1	1–4	3–5
1969–70	Mitropa Cup	R16	(Italy) Brescia	3–1	0–0	3–1
1969–70	Mitropa Cup	QF	(Czechoslovakia) Slavia Prague	2–2	1–1	3–3 (a)
1970–71	Inter-Cities Fairs Cup	R1	(Bulgaria) Slavia Sofia	3–0	0–1	3–1
1970–71	Inter-Cities Fairs Cup	R2	(Portugal) Vitória de Setúbal	2–1	0–2	2–3
1971–72	European Cup	R1	(Spain) Valencia	1–1	0–0	1–1 (a)
1972–73	Cup Winners' Cup	R1	(Norway) Fredrikstad	1–0	1–0	2–0
1972–73	Cup Winners' Cup	R2	(Wales) Wrexham	2–0	1–3	3–3 (a)
1972–73	Cup Winners' Cup	QF	(Scotland) Hibernian	3–0	2–4	5–4
1972–73	Cup Winners' Cup	SF	(England) Leeds United	0–0	0–1	0–1
1974–75	European Cup	R1	(Iceland) Keflavík	7–1	2–0	9–1
1974–75	European Cup	R2	(France) Saint-Étienne	4–1	1–5	5–6
1975–76	European Cup	R1	(Malta) Floriana	3–0	5–0	8–0
1975–76	European Cup	R2	(Belgium) Molenbeek	4–0	3–2	7–2
1975–76	European Cup	QF	(Netherlands) PSV	2–0	0–3 (a.e.t.)	2–3
1976–77	Cup Winners' Cup	R1	(Belgium) Lierse	3–0	0–1	3–1
1976–77	Cup Winners' Cup	R2	(Spain) Atlético Madrid	1–2	0–1	1–3
1977–78	Cup Winners' Cup	R1	(Republic of Ireland) Dundalk	4–0	0–1	4–1
1977–78	Cup Winners' Cup	R2	(Hungary) Diósgyőri VTK	2–1	1–2	3–3 (4–3 p)
1977–78	Cup Winners' Cup	QF	Austria Wien	1–1	1–1	2–2 (0–3 p)
1978–79	UEFA Cup	R1	(Austria) Rapid Wien	2–0	1–2	3–2
1978–79	UEFA Cup	R2	(England) Arsenal	2–1	0–1	2–2 (a)
1979–80	European Cup	R1	(Turkey) Trabzonspor	1–0	1–0	2–0
1979–80	European Cup	R2	(Denmark) Vejle	1–2	3–0	4–2
1979–80	European Cup	QF	(West Germany) Hamburger SV	3–2	0–1	3–3 (a)
1981–82	UEFA Cup	R1	(West Germany) VfB Stuttgart	3–1	2–2	5–3
1981–82	UEFA Cup	R2	(Belgium) Beveren	1–2	3–2	4–4 (a)
1981–82	UEFA Cup	R3	(Spain) Valencia	4–1	1–5	5–6
1982–83	UEFA Cup	R1	(Malta) Zurrieq	4–0	4–1	8–1
1982–83	UEFA Cup	R2	(France) Bordeaux	4–1	0–4	4–5
1983–84	UEFA Cup	R1	(Romania) Universitatea Craiova	1–0	0–1	1–1 (3–1 p)
1983–84	UEFA Cup	R2	(Hungary) Budapest Honvéd	3–0	2–3	5–3
1983–84	UEFA Cup	R3	(Socialist Federal Republic of Yugoslavia) Radnički Niš	2–0	2–0	4–0
1983–84	UEFA Cup	QF	(Czechoslovakia) Sparta Prague	2–0 (a.e.t.)	0–1	2–1
1983–84	UEFA Cup	SF	(England) Tottenham Hotspur	2–1	0–1	2–2 (a)
1984–85	Cup Winners' Cup	R1	(Soviet Union) Dynamo Moscow	2–5	0–1	2–6
1985–86	UEFA Cup	R1	(France) Metz	5–1	2–2	7–3
1985–86	UEFA Cup	R2	(Italy) Torino	3–1	1–1	4–2
1985–86	UEFA Cup	R3	(Soviet Union) Dnipro Dnipropetrovsk	2–0	1–0	3–0
1985–86	UEFA Cup	QF	(Belgium) KSV Waregem	1–0	0–1	1–1 (4–5 p)
1986–87	UEFA Cup	R1	(Greece) OFI	4–0	0–1	4–1
1986–87	UEFA Cup	R2	(Bulgaria) Trakia Plovdiv	3–1	2–2	5–3
1986–87	UEFA Cup	R3	(Scotland) Dundee United	0–0	0–2	0–2
1987–88	Cup Winners' Cup	R1	(Denmark) AaB	1–0	0–1	1–1 (4–2 p)
1987–88	Cup Winners' Cup	R2	(France) Marseille	0–3 (Note: Game originally finished 2–0 for Hajduk Split, but was later awarded 0–3 for Marseille because of crowd trouble. In addition, Hajduk was banned for two years from all European competitions.)	0–4	0–7
1991–92	Cup Winners' Cup	R1	(England) Tottenham Hotspur	1–0	0–2	1–2
1993–94	Cup Winners' Cup	R1	(Netherlands) Ajax	1–0	0–6	1–6
1994–95	Champions League	QR	(Poland) Legia Warsaw	4–0	1–0	5–0
1994–95	Champions League	Group; C	(Portugal) Benfica	0–0	1–2	2nd out of 4
1994–95	Champions League	Group; C	(Romania) Steaua București	1–4	1–0	2nd out of 4
1994–95	Champions League	Group; C	(Belgium) Anderlecht	2–1	0–0	2nd out of 4
1994–95	Champions League	QF	(Netherlands) Ajax	0–0	0–3	0–3
1995–96	Champions League	QR	(Greece) Panathinaikos	1–1	0–0	1–1 (a)
1996–97	UEFA Cup	PR	(Moldova) Zimbru Chișinău	2–1	4–0	6–1
1996–97	UEFA Cup	QR	(Russia) Torpedo Moscow	1–0	0–2	1–2
1997–98	UEFA Cup	QR1	(Luxembourg) CS Grevenmacher	2–0	4–1	6–1
1997–98	UEFA Cup	QR2	(Sweden) Malmö FF	3–2	2–0	5–2
1997–98	UEFA Cup	R1	(Germany) Schalke 04	2–3	0–2	2–5
1998–99	UEFA Cup	QR2	(Sweden) Malmö FF	1–1	2–1	3–2
1998–99	UEFA Cup	R1	(Italy) Fiorentina	0–0	1–2	1–2
1999–2000	UEFA Cup	QR	(Luxembourg) F91 Dudelange	5–0	1–1	6–1
1999–2000	UEFA Cup	R1	(Bulgaria) Levski Sofia	0–0	0–3	0–3
2000–01	Champions League	QR2	(Hungary) Dunaferr	0–2	2–2	2–4
2001–02	Champions League	QR2	(Hungary) Ferencváros	0–0	0–0	0–0 (6–5 p)
2001–02	Champions League	QR3	(Spain) Mallorca	1–0	0–2 (a.e.t.)	1–2
2001–02	UEFA Cup	R1	(Poland) Wisła Kraków	2–2	0–1	2–3
2002–03	UEFA Cup	QR	(Faroe Islands) GÍ Gøta	3–0	8–0	11–0
2002–03	UEFA Cup	R1	(England) Fulham	0–1	2–2	2–3
2003–04	UEFA Cup	QR	(Finland) Haka	1–0	1–2	2–2 (a)
2003–04	UEFA Cup	R1	(Switzerland) Grasshopper	0–0	1–1	1–1 (a)
2003–04	UEFA Cup	R2	(Italy) Roma	1–1	0–1	1–2
2004–05	Champions League	QR2	(Republic of Ireland) Shelbourne	3–2	0–2	3–4
2005–06	Champions League	QR2	(Hungary) Debrecen	0–5	0–3	0–8
2007–08	UEFA Cup	QR1	(Montenegro) Budućnost Podgorica	1–0	1–1	2–1
2007–08	UEFA Cup	QR2	(Italy) Sampdoria	0–1	1–1	1–2
2008–09	UEFA Cup	QR1	(Malta) Birkirkara	4–0	3–0	7–0
2008–09	UEFA Cup	QR2	(Spain) Deportivo La Coruña	0–2	0–0	0–2
2009–10	Europa League	QR3	(Slovakia) Žilina	0–1	1–1	1–2
2010–11	Europa League	QR3	(Romania) Dinamo București	3–0	1–3	4–3
2010–11	Europa League	PO	(Romania) Unirea Urziceni	4–1	1–1	5–2
2010–11	Europa League	Group; G	(Greece) AEK Athens	1–3	1–3	4th out of 4
2010–11	Europa League	Group; G	(Belgium) Anderlecht	1–0	0–2	4th out of 4
2010–11	Europa League	Group; G	(Russia) Zenit Saint Petersburg	2–3	0–2	4th out of 4
2011–12	Europa League	QR3	(England) Stoke City	0–1	0–1	0–2
2012–13	Europa League	QR2	(Latvia) Skonto	2–0	0–1	2–1
2012–13	Europa League	QR3	(Italy) Inter Milan	0–3	2–0	2–3
2013–14	Europa League	QR2	(North Macedonia) Horizont Turnovo	2–1	1–1	3–2
2013–14	Europa League	QR3	(Georgia (country)) Dila Gori	0–1	0–1	0–2
2014–15	Europa League	QR2	(Republic of Ireland) Dundalk	1–2	2–0	3–2
2014–15	Europa League	QR3	(Kazakhstan) Shakhter Karagandy	3–0	2–4	5–4
2014–15	Europa League	PO	(Ukraine) Dnipro Dnipropetrovsk	0–0	1–2	1–2
2015–16	Europa League	QR1	(Estonia) Sillamäe Kalev	6–2	1–1	7–3
2015–16	Europa League	QR2	(Slovenia) Koper	4–1	2–3	6–4
2015–16	Europa League	QR3	(Norway) Strømsgodset	2–0	2–0	4–0
2015–16	Europa League	PO	(Czech Republic) Slovan Liberec	0–1	0–1	0–2
2016–17	Europa League	QR2	(Romania) CSMS Iași	2–1	2–2	4–3
2016–17	Europa League	QR3	(Ukraine) Oleksandriya	3–1	3–0	6–1
2016–17	Europa League	PO	(Israel) Maccabi Tel Aviv	2–1	1–2	3–3 (3–4 p)
2017–18	Europa League	QR2	(Bulgaria) Levski Sofia	1–0	2–1	3–1
2017–18	Europa League	QR3	(Denmark) Brøndby IF	2–0	0–0	2–0
2017–18	Europa League	PO	(England) Everton	1–1	0–2	1–3
2018–19	Europa League	QR2	(Bulgaria) Slavia Sofia	1–0	3–2	4–2
2018–19	Europa League	QR3	(Romania) FCSB	0–0	1–2	1–2
2019–20	Europa League	QR1	(Malta) Gżira United	1–3	2–0	3–3 (a)
2020–21	Europa League	QR2	(North Macedonia) Renova	—N/a	1–0	—N/a
2020–21	Europa League	QR3	(Turkey) Galatasaray	—N/a	0–2	—N/a
2021–22	Europa Conference League	QR2	(Kazakhstan) Tobol	2–0	1–4 (a.e.t.)	3–4
2022–23	Europa Conference League	QR3	(Portugal) Vitória de Guimarães	3–1	0–1	3–2
2022–23	Europa Conference League	PO	(Spain) Villarreal	0–2	2–4	2–6
2023–24	Europa Conference League	QR3	(Greece) PAOK	0–0	0–3	0–3
2024–25	Conference League	QR2	(Faroe Islands) HB Tórshavn	2–0	0–0	2–0
2024–25	Conference League	QR3	(Slovakia) Ružomberok	0–1	0–0	0–1
2025–26	Conference League	QR2	(Azerbaijan) Zira	2–1 (a.e.t.)	1–1	3–2
2025–26	Conference League	QR3	(Albania) Dinamo City	2–1	1–3 (a.e.t.)	3–4
2026–27	Europa League	QR1	(Slovakia) Žilina	2–0	1–2	3–2
2026–27	Europa League	QR2	(Cyprus) Pafos	2–0	0–4 (a.e.t.)	2–4
2026–27	Conference League	QR3	(Lithuania) Žalgiris	4–0	5–2	9–2
2026–27	Conference League	PO	(Poland) Raków Częstochowa	2–2	3–2 (a.e.t.)	5–4
2026–27	Conference League	LP	(Netherlands) Ajax	2–1	—N/a	TBD out of 36
2026–27	Conference League	LP	(Switzerland) Thun	—N/a	1–0	TBD out of 36
2026–27	Conference League	LP	(Gibraltar) Lincoln Red Imps	—N/a	0–1	TBD out of 36
2026–27	Conference League	LP	(Belgium) Sint-Truiden		—N/a	TBD out of 36
2026–27	Conference League	LP	(Denmark) Nordsjælland		—N/a	TBD out of 36
2026–27	Conference League	LP	(Denmark) Midtjylland	—N/a		TBD out of 36

Note: Hajduk score always listed first.

^{2} 1960 Mitropa Cup was contested as a competition between countries and there was no elimination.

== Record by country ==
Information correct as of 23 October 2026

HNK Hajduk Split record in European football by country
Country	Pld	W	D	L	GF	GA	GD	Win%
Albania	2	1	0	1	3	4	−1	50.00
Austria	6	1	2	3	6	13	−7	16.67
Azerbaijan	2	1	1	0	3	2	+1	50.00
Belgium	12	7	1	4	18	11	+7	58.33
Bulgaria	10	6	2	2	15	10	+5	60.00
Cyprus	2	1	0	1	2	4	−2	50.00
Czech Republic	2	0	0	2	0	2	−2	0.00
Czechoslovakia	8	2	2	4	9	13	−4	25.00
Denmark	6	3	1	2	7	3	+4	50.00
England	16	3	3	10	11	21	−10	18.75
Estonia	2	1	1	0	7	3	+4	50.00
Faroe Islands	4	3	1	0	13	0	+13	75.00
Finland	2	1	0	1	2	2	+0	50.00
France	8	3	1	4	16	21	−5	37.50
Georgia	2	0	0	2	0	2	−2	0.00
Germany	2	0	0	2	2	5	−3	0.00
West Germany	6	4	1	1	13	9	+4	66.67
Greece	8	1	3	4	7	11	−4	12.50
Hungary	12	3	3	6	13	26	−13	25.00
Iceland	2	2	0	0	9	1	+8	100.00
Ireland	6	3	0	3	10	7	+3	50.00
Israel	2	1	0	1	3	3	+0	50.00
Italy	14	5	5	4	16	13	+3	35.71
Kazakhstan	4	2	0	2	8	8	+0	50.00
Latvia	2	1	0	1	2	1	+1	50.00
Lithuania	2	2	0	0	9	2	+7	100.00
Luxembourg	4	4	0	0	12	1	+11	100.00
Malta	8	7	0	1	26	4	+22	87.50
Moldova	2	2	0	0	6	1	+5	100.00
Montenegro	2	1	1	0	2	1	+1	50.00
Netherlands	7	3	1	3	5	13	−8	42.86
North Macedonia	3	2	1	0	4	2	+2	66.67
Norway	4	4	0	0	6	0	+6	100.00
Poland	8	4	2	2	13	8	+5	50.00
Portugal	6	2	1	3	6	7	−1	33.33
Romania	12	5	3	4	17	15	+2	41.67
Russia	4	1	0	3	3	7	−4	25.00
Soviet Union	4	2	0	2	5	6	−1	50.00
Scotland	4	1	1	2	5	6	−1	25.00
Slovakia	10	2	3	5	7	8	−1	20.00
Slovenia	2	1	0	1	6	4	+2	50.00
Spain	12	2	3	7	10	20	−10	16.67
Sweden	4	3	1	0	8	4	+4	75.00
Switzerland	3	1	2	0	2	1	+1	33.33
Turkey	3	2	0	1	2	2	+0	66.67
Ukraine	4	2	1	1	7	3	+4	50.00
Wales	2	1	0	1	3	3	+0	50.00
Yugoslavia	2	2	0	0	4	0	+4	100.00

=== Player records ===
- Most appearances in UEFA club competitions: 48 appearances
  - Vedran Rožić
- Top scorers in UEFA club competitions: 16 goals
  - Zlatko Vujović

== UEFA club coefficient ranking ==
=== Current ===
As of 8 August 2026

Rank	Team	Points
145	(Kazakhstan) Kairat	10.000
145	(Turkey) Sivasspor	10.000
145	(Slovakia) Shamrock Rovers	10.000
145	(Croatia) Hajduk Split	10.000
145	(Romania) Universitatea Craiova	10.000
145	(Azerbaijan) Neftçi	10.000
145	(Kazakhstan) Kairat	10.000

=== Rankings ===
==== 1999–2017 ====
Season	Ranking	Movement	Points	Change
1998–99	111	—	20.187	—
1999–00	187	▼ -76	10.062	▼ -10.125
2000–01	181	▲ +6	11.999	▲ +1.937
2001–02	185	▼ -4	13.520	▲ +1.521
2002–03	179	▲ +6	13.312	▼ -0.208
2003–04	166	▲ +13	11.733	▼ -1.579
2004–05	175	▼ -9	10.980	▼ -0.753
2005–06	184	▼ -9	9.647	▼ -1.333
2006–07	187	▼ -3	7.533	▼ -2.144
2007–08	181	▲ +6	6.836	▼ -0.697
2008–09	204	▼ -23	2.466	▼ -4.370
2009–10	217	▼ -13	3.466	▲ +1.000
2010–11	185	▲ +32	6.224	▲ +2.758
2011–12	177	▲ +8	7.774	▲ +1.550
2012–13	160	▲ +16	8.916	▲ +1.142
2013–14	163	▼ -3	9.925	▲ +1.009
2014–15	153	▲ +10	11.200	▲ +1.275
2015–16	156	▼ -3	10.775	▼ -0.425
2016–17	140	▲ +16	11.550	▲ +0.775

==== 2017–present ====
===== 5-year calculation =====
Season	Ranking	Movement	Points	Change
2017–18	157	▼ -17	7.000	—
2018–19	137	▲20	8.000	—
2019–20	148	▼ -11	7.500	—
2020–21	137	▲11	8.000	—
2021–22	144	▼ -7	8.000	—
2022–23	152	▼ -8	9.000	—
2023–24	155	▼ -3	9.000	—
2024–25	152	▲3	10.000	—
2025–26	167	▼ -16	10.000	—
2026–27	161	▲6	10.000	—

===== 10-year calculation =====
Season	Ranking		Points	Moved
2017–18	216	—	12.000	—
2018–19	191	—	14.000	—
2019–20	193	—	14.000	—
2020–21	191	—	14.000	—
2021–22	187	—	14.500	—
2022–23	171	—	16.000	—
2023–24	169	—	17.000	—
2024–25	172	—	17.500	—
2025–26	179	—	18.000	—
2026–27	177	—	18.000	—
