= 1983–84 Yugoslav Cup =

Marshal Tito Cup

Tournament details
- Country: Yugoslavia

Final positions
- Champions: Hajduk Split (7th title)
- Runners-up: Red Star

Tournament statistics
- Top goal scorer(s): Zdenko Adamović; Milko Đurovski (3 goals each)

The 1983–84 Yugoslav Cup was the 36th season of the top football knockout competition in SFR Yugoslavia, the Yugoslav Cup (Serbo-Croatian: Kup Jugoslavije), also known as the "Marshal Tito Cup" (Kup Maršala Tita), since its establishment in 1946.

== Calendar ==
Round	Date	Fixtures	Clubs
First round	21 September 1983	16	32 → 16
Second round	16 November 1983	8	16 → 8
Quarter-finals	18 April 1984	8	8 → 4
Semi-finals	2 May 1984	4	4 → 2
Final	9 and 24 May 1984	2	2 → 1

== First round proper ==
Tie no	Home team	Score	Away team
1	OFK Titograd	0–3	FK Sarajevo
2	Proleter Zrenjanin	1–3	Radnički Niš
3	Vitez	0–0	HNK Rijeka
HNK Rijeka win 6 – 5 on penalties
4	OFK Belgrade	1–0	FK Partizan
5	Lokomotiva Vinkovci	1–1	NK Osijek
NK Osijek win 7 – 6 on penalties
6	Vojvodina	1–0	Borac Čačak
7	Drina Zvornik	1–0	Velež Mostar
8	Belasica	0–1	Dinamo Zagreb
9	Dubočica	2–0	Olimpija Ljubljana
10	Metalac Sisak	2–1	Vardar
11	NK Maribor	0–1	Hajduk Split
12	Sloboda Tuzla	3–0	Radnički Pirot
13	GOŠK-Jug	3–1	Budućnost Titograd
14	Crvena Zvezda	3–2	FC Prishtina
15	Galenika Zemun	2–1	Željezničar Sarajevo
16	Dinamo Vinkovci	2–1	Spartak Subotica

== Second round proper ==
Tie no	Home team	Score	Away team
1	NK Osijek	2–2	Metalac Sisak
Metalac Sisak win 5 – 4 on penalties
2	FK Sarajevo	4–1	Dinamo Vinkovci
3	Radnički Niš	2–1	OFK Belgrade
4	Dinamo Zagreb	2–0	Sloboda Tuzla
5	HNK Rijeka	2–1	Drina Zvornik
6	Hajduk Split	6–2	Galenika Zemun
7	Dubočica	0–1	Crvena Zvezda
8	GOŠK-Jug	1–0	Vojvodina

== Quarterfinals ==
Tie no	Home team	Score	Away team
1	Dinamo Zagreb	2–0	Radnički Niš
2	Metalac Sisak	1–0	GOŠK-Jug
3	HNK Rijeka	1–4	Crvena Zvezda
4	FK Sarajevo	0–4	Hajduk Split

== Semifinals ==
Tie no	Home team	Score	Away team
1	Crvena Zvezda	2–1	Dinamo Zagreb
2	Hajduk Split	2–1	Metalac Sisak

== Final ==
1984 Yugoslav Cup Final
- Event: 1983–84 Yugoslav Cup
Hajduk Split	Red Star
2	1
- on aggregate

First leg
Hajduk Split	Red Star
2	1
- Date: 9 May 1984
- Venue: Poljud Stadium, Split

Second leg
Red Star	Hajduk Split
0	0
- Date: 24 May 1984
- Venue: Red Star Stadium, Belgrade

=== Summary ===
The 1984 Yugoslav Cup Final was contested by Hajduk Split and Red Star over two legs, played at the Poljud Stadium in Split and the Red Star Stadium in Belgrade. Hajduk Split won 2–1 on aggregate, winning the first leg in Split with goals from Blaž Slišković and Zoran Vulić, while the second leg in Belgrade ended in a goalless draw.

Hajduk had reached the final ten times previously, winning six titles (1967, 1972, 1973, 1974, 1976, 1977). It was their first silverware in five years after their 1978–79 Yugoslav First League win.

=== First leg ===
9 May 1984

Hajduk Split	2–1	Red Star
Slišković 3'; Vulić 87' (pen.)		Mrkela 11'

Poljud Stadium, Split
Attendance: 12,000
Referee: Adem Fazlagić (Sarajevo)

Hajduk Split	Red Star

HAJDUK SPLIT:
GK	1	(Socialist Federal Republic of Yugoslavia) Zoran Simović
FW	2	(Socialist Federal Republic of Yugoslavia) Zoran Vulić
DF	3	(Socialist Federal Republic of Yugoslavia) Goran Šušnjara
MF	4	(Socialist Federal Republic of Yugoslavia) Dragutin Čelić	Substituted off
DF	5	(Socialist Federal Republic of Yugoslavia) Josip Čop
DF	6	(Socialist Federal Republic of Yugoslavia) Vedran Rožić
FW	7	(Socialist Federal Republic of Yugoslavia) Zlatko Vujović
MF	8	(Socialist Federal Republic of Yugoslavia) Blaž Slišković
DF	9	(Socialist Federal Republic of Yugoslavia) Zoran Vujović
MF	10	(Socialist Federal Republic of Yugoslavia) Nenad Šalov
MF	11	(Socialist Federal Republic of Yugoslavia) Ive Jerolimov
Substitutes:
GK	12	(Socialist Federal Republic of Yugoslavia) Ivan Pudar
DF	13	(Socialist Federal Republic of Yugoslavia) Darko Dražić
FW	14	(Socialist Federal Republic of Yugoslavia) Janko Janković
FW	15	(Socialist Federal Republic of Yugoslavia) Dževad Prekazi	Substituted on
FW	16	(Socialist Federal Republic of Yugoslavia) Davor Čop
Manager:
(Socialist Federal Republic of Yugoslavia) Petar Nadoveza

RED STAR:
GK	1	(Socialist Federal Republic of Yugoslavia) Tomislav Ivković
DF	2	(Socialist Federal Republic of Yugoslavia) Miroslav Šugar
DF	3	(Socialist Federal Republic of Yugoslavia) Milan Jovin
DF	4	(Socialist Federal Republic of Yugoslavia) Ivan Jurišić
DF	5	(Socialist Federal Republic of Yugoslavia) Dragan Miletović
DF	6	(Socialist Federal Republic of Yugoslavia) Marko Elsner
MF	7	(Socialist Federal Republic of Yugoslavia) Miloš Šestić
MF	8	(Socialist Federal Republic of Yugoslavia) Mitar Mrkela	Substituted off
FW	9	(Socialist Federal Republic of Yugoslavia) Jovica Nikolić	Substituted off
DF	10	(Socialist Federal Republic of Yugoslavia) Đorđe Milovanović
MF	11	(Socialist Federal Republic of Yugoslavia) Milko Đurovski
Substitutes:
GK	12	(Socialist Federal Republic of Yugoslavia) Slobodan Karalić
DF	13	(Socialist Federal Republic of Yugoslavia) Miodrag Krivokapić
MF	14	(Socialist Federal Republic of Yugoslavia) Nedeljko Milosavljević	Substituted on
MF	15	(Socialist Federal Republic of Yugoslavia) Žarko Đurović	Substituted on
MF	16	(Socialist Federal Republic of Yugoslavia) Ranko Đorđić
Manager:
(Socialist Federal Republic of Yugoslavia) Gojko Zec

=== Second leg ===
24 May 1984

Red Star	0–0	Hajduk Split

Red Star Stadium, Belgrade
Attendance: 70,000
Referee: Beriša Šinasi (Priština)

Red Star	Hajduk Split

RED STAR:
GK	1	(Socialist Federal Republic of Yugoslavia) Tomislav Ivković
DF	2	(Socialist Federal Republic of Yugoslavia) Dragan Miletović
DF	3	(Socialist Federal Republic of Yugoslavia) Milan Jovin
DF	4	(Socialist Federal Republic of Yugoslavia) Miroslav Šugar
DF	5	(Socialist Federal Republic of Yugoslavia) Marko Elsner
DF	6	(Socialist Federal Republic of Yugoslavia) Ivan Jurišić
MF	7	(Socialist Federal Republic of Yugoslavia) Miloš Šestić (c)
MF	8	(Socialist Federal Republic of Yugoslavia) Milan Janković
FW	9	(Socialist Federal Republic of Yugoslavia) Jovica Nikolić	(substituted off) 70'
DF	10	(Socialist Federal Republic of Yugoslavia) Đorđe Milovanović
MF	11	(Socialist Federal Republic of Yugoslavia) Mitar Mrkela	Substituted off
Substitutes:
MF	?	(Socialist Federal Republic of Yugoslavia) Žarko Đurović	(substituted on) 70'
MF	?	(Socialist Federal Republic of Yugoslavia) Ranko Đorđić	Substituted on
Manager:
(Socialist Federal Republic of Yugoslavia) Gojko Zec

HAJDUK SPLIT:
GK	1	(Socialist Federal Republic of Yugoslavia) Zoran Simović
DF	2	(Socialist Federal Republic of Yugoslavia) Zoran Vulić
DF	3	(Socialist Federal Republic of Yugoslavia) Branko Miljuš
DF	4	(Socialist Federal Republic of Yugoslavia) Ivan Gudelj
DF	5	(Socialist Federal Republic of Yugoslavia) Josip Čop
DF	6	(Socialist Federal Republic of Yugoslavia) Vedran Rožić (c)
MF	7	(Socialist Federal Republic of Yugoslavia) Zlatko Vujović	(substituted off) 27'
FW	8	(Socialist Federal Republic of Yugoslavia) Blaž Slišković
FW	9	(Socialist Federal Republic of Yugoslavia) Ive Jerolimov
MF	10	(Socialist Federal Republic of Yugoslavia) Nenad Šalov
FW	11	(Socialist Federal Republic of Yugoslavia) Dušan Pešić	(substituted off) 88'
Substitutes:
MF	16	(Socialist Federal Republic of Yugoslavia) Dževad Prekazi	(substituted on) 27'
MF	?	(Socialist Federal Republic of Yugoslavia) Goran Šušnjara	(substituted on) 88'
Manager:
(Socialist Federal Republic of Yugoslavia) Petar Nadoveza

== See also ==
- 1983–84 Yugoslav First League
- 1983–84 Yugoslav Second League
