= Jure Primorac =

Croatian footballer (born 1981)

Personal information
- Date of birth: 10 December 1981 (age 44)
- Place of birth: Split, SFR Yugoslavia
- Height: 1.88 m (6 ft 2 in)
- Position: Defender

Team information
- Current team: US Ivry

Senior career*
Years	Team	Apps	(Gls)
1999–2000	AS Cannes	9	(1)
2000–2006	Rennes (B team)	67	(3)
2002–2003	→ US Créteil-Lusitanos (loan)	13	(1)
2006–2009	Čelik Zenica		
2009–2015	US Ivry	88	(12)
- * Club domestic league appearances and goals as of 14 February 2014

Jure Primorac (born 10 December 1981) is a Croatian former professional football player.

He played professionally in Ligue 2 for AS Cannes and US Créteil-Lusitanos.

He is the son of Boro Primorac.
