= Mišo Krstičević =

Croatian footballer and manager

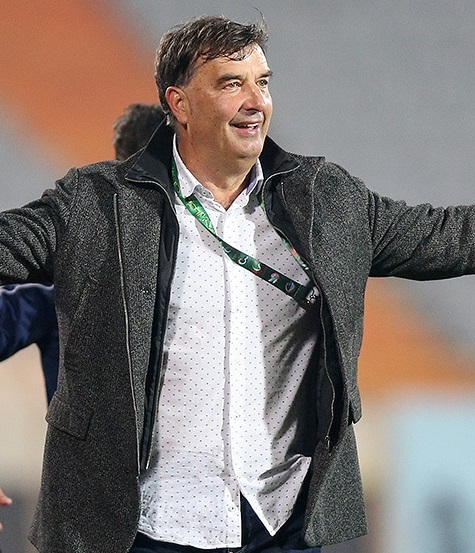
- Krstičević as manager of Shahin Bushehr in 2019

Personal information
- Full name: Mišo Krstičević
- Date of birth: 19 February 1958 (age 68)
- Place of birth: Metković, FPR Yugoslavia
- Position: Defender

Team information
- Current team: Jadran LP (manager)

Youth career
- 1972–1975: Jadran Ploče
- 1975–1978: Neretva Metković

Senior career*
Years	Team	Apps	(Gls)
1978–1983	Hajduk Split	115	(21)
1983–1984	Rijeka	15	(0)
1984–1986	Velež Mostar	53	(8)
1986–1988	Rot-Weiß Oberhausen	38	(8)
Total		221	(37)

International career
1979–1980	Yugoslavia	7	(1)

Managerial career
- Jadran Ploče
- 2004–2005: Hajduk Split (assistant)
- 2007: Trogir
- 2007–2011: Jadran Ploče
- 2011: Tirana
- 2011–2012: Hajduk Split U19
- 2012–2013: Hajduk Split
- 2013: Croatia (assistant)
- 2015: Zrinjski Mostar
- 2015–2019: Mes Rafsanjan
- 2019–2020: Shahin Bushehr
- 2022–: Jadran LP
Medal record
Men's football
Representing Yugoslavia
Mediterranean Games
Gold medal – first place	1979 Split	Team
Olympic Games
Bronze medal – third place	1984 Los Angeles	Team
- * Club domestic league appearances and goals

Mišo Krstičević (born 19 February 1958) is a Croatian professional football manager and former player. He is currently the manager of third-tier club Jadran LP.

== Club career ==
Krstičević began his career in 1972 when he made a senior debut as a 14-year-old for Jadran Ploče. The same year he was spotted by Neretva Metković. After joining Neretva, he went to their youth academy. He debuted for them in 1975 and played with them until 1978 when he was spotted and bought by Hajduk Split.

In his first season at Hajduk, he managed to win the Yugoslav championship in 1979. He played a huge part in that winning season by playing 33 times and becoming a first team regular. Despite having world class teammates such as Zlatko Vujović and Ivan Gudelj he still managed to hold his regular team status. He played in the 1979–80 European Cup where Hajduk reached the quarter-finals. He made a total of 206 appearances and 36 goals for Hajduk. Krstičević is also remembered for scoring the last goal for Hajduk on their old Stari plac stadium in 1979.

In 1983, he left Hajduk and went to Rijeka. After one year at Rijeka, he joined Velež Mostar where he won the Yugoslav Cup in 1986. In 1986, he left Velež and went to Rot-Weiß Oberhausen. After playing two more years at Oberhausen, he retired in 1988.

== International career ==
Krstičević made his international debut for Yugoslavia on 1 April 1979 against Cyprus. He won a gold medal at the 1979 Mediterranean Games and a bronze medal at the 1980 Summer Olympics. He scored his only goal for Yugoslavia against Romania in 1980 at the Balkan Cup. He played his last international game against Romania on 27 August 1980. He made a total of seven appearances and scored one goal for Yugoslavia.

== Managerial career ==
=== Early career ===
Krstičević began his managerial career in his first club, Jadran Ploče, before joining Hajduk Split in 2004 as an assistant to Blaž Slišković. Although he led Hajduk to the eventual title, Slišković was sacked before the championship ended and Krstičević left the club as well, taking over third division team Trogir. Krstičević led Trogir to promotion to the second division, but then he surprisingly left the club, once again taking over his first club Jadran Ploče in September 2007. He stayed in Jadran for four seasons, keeping the mediocre club constantly near the top of the league. In 2011, Krstičević took over KF Tirana, winning the national cup but disappointingly finishing fifth in the national championship.

=== Hajduk Split ===
He left Albania in the summer of 2011, taking over the under-19 team of Hajduk Split. Under his guidance Hajduk's youth team dominated the national championship in front of recently much renowned Dinamo Zagreb's youth team. His U-19 team won the Croatian U-19 league in 2012. After Hajduk's first team manager Krasimir Balakov left for 1. FC Kaiserslautern, Krstičević was appointed as the new manager. He finished second in the 2011–12 Prva HNL but it was thanks to Balakov's previous results. In the 2012–13 UEFA Europa League he was kicked out in the third qualifying round by Inter Milan after a 2–3 aggregate loss. In the 2012–13 Prva HNL, he started well by finishing first after the starting four matches. After his first defeat in the new season against Lokomotiva, the team started to decline which caused bad results and low team morale. After the autumn part of the season, the team finished second in the league and qualified for the 2012–13 Croatian Cup semi-final.

In late April 2013, after he suffered a 1–2 loss against Rijeka on home ground, he was sacked by Hajduk chairman Marin Brbić due to a string of poor results.

=== Later career ===
In May 2013, he joined the national team of Croatia as an assistant manager to Igor Štimac. After a series of bad results he left the national team alongside Štimac on 16 October 2013.

At the beginning of 2015, Krstičević took a managerial place in Zrinjski Mostar but it lasted only a few months.

Between 2015 and 2019, Krstičević was the manager of Iranian Second League club Mes Rafsanjan on three occasions (2015–2016, 2016–2017 and 2018–2019).

== Career statistics ==
=== International goals ===
Goal	Date	Venue	Opponent	Score	Result	Competition
1	30 March 1980	Omladinski Stadium, Karaburma	Romania	1 – 0	2 – 0	Balkan Cup

== Honours ==
=== Player ===
Hajduk Split

- Yugoslav First League: 1978–79

Velež Mostar

- Yugoslav Cup: 1985–86

Yugoslavia

- Mediterranean Games: 1979
- Summer Olympics Fourth place: 1980

=== Manager ===
Trogir

- Croatian Third League (South): 2006–07

Tirana

- Albanian Cup: 2010–11

Hajduk Split U19

- Croatian U-19 League: 2011–12
