= Goran Šušnjara =

Croatian-Yugoslav footballer (born 1958)

Personal information
- Full name: Goran Šušnjara
- Date of birth: 29 May 1958 (age 68)
- Place of birth: Split, FPR Yugoslavia
- Position: Midfielder

Team information
- Current team: Zmaj Makarska (manager)

Youth career
- -1975: Omiš
- 1975–1981: RNK Split

Senior career*
Years	Team	Apps	(Gls)
1982–1985	Hajduk Split	65	(1)
1985–1987	Šibenik	15	(0)
1987–1988	TSV Schwaben Augsburg	26	(2)
1989–1990	FC Augsburg	18	(1)
1993	Dubrovnik	5	(0)
1994	Pazinka	5	(0)

Managerial career
- Orkan
- Mosor
- 2011: Omiš
- 2014–2015: Imotski
- 2016: RNK Split (assistant)
- 2016: Orkan
- 2017: Orkan
- 2017: Val
- 2021–2022: Kamen Ivanbegovina
- 2022-: Zmaj Makarska
- * Club domestic league appearances and goals

Goran Šušnjara (born 29 May 1958 in Split, SFR Yugoslavia) is a Croatian retired midfielder who played for Hajduk Split and is the current manager of Zmaj Makarska.

== Playing career ==
Šušnjara started his career at RNK Split, making his debut against Dinara Knin. He joined Hajduk Split in 1982 after serving a year in the army. He later played for Šibenik and German side TSV Schwaben Augsburg.

== Managerial career ==
Šušnjara was dismissed by NK Imotski in October 2015, then became assistant to head coach Zoran Vulić at RNK Split in May 2016. and later was reappointed manager of Orkan in March 2017, taking over from Dalibor Filipović after he had earlier taken charge replacing Ante Vitaić in autumn 2016. In September 2017, he was named manager at NK Val Kaštel Stari, succeeding Davor Čop.

He resigned as manager of Kamen Ivanbegovina in September 2022, then was appointed at the helm of Zmaj.
