= Branko Miljuš =

Croatian footballer

Personal information
- Full name: Branko Miljuš
- Date of birth: 17 August 1960 (age 66)
- Place of birth: Knin, PR Croatia, FPR Yugoslavia
- Position: Defender

Senior career*
Years	Team	Apps	(Gls)
1980–1988	Hajduk Split	174	(2)
1988–1990	Real Valladolid	26	(1)
1990–1992	Vitória Setúbal	44	(6)

International career
1984-1988	Yugoslavia	14	(0)
Medal record
Men's Football
Representing Yugoslavia
Olympic Games
Bronze medal – third place	1984 Los Angeles	Team
- * Club domestic league appearances and goals

Branko Miljuš (born 17 August 1960) is a Croatian retired footballer.

== Club career ==
During his club career he played in 357 games (217 competitive matches) for Hajduk Split.

In his late career, Miljuš left Yugoslavia few years before the independence of Croatia, at the time tension of Serbs and Croats was rising. He then played in Spain for Real Valladolid and in Portugal for Vitória Setúbal.

== International career ==
Miljuš made his debut for Yugoslavia in a June 1984 friendly match away against Portugal and earned a total of 14 caps, scoring no goals. He participated in the UEFA Euro 1984. He won a bronze medal playing for Yugoslavia in the 1984 Summer Olympics in Los Angeles.

His final international was an April 1988 friendly away against the Republic of Ireland.
