= Boro Primorac =

Bosnian professional football coach

Personal information
- Full name: Boro Primorac
- Date of birth: 5 December 1954 (age 71)
- Place of birth: Mostar, FPR Yugoslavia
- Height: 1.90 m (6 ft 3 in)
- Position: Defender

Senior career*
| Years | Team | Apps | (Gls) |
| 1972–1978 | Velež Mostar | 133 | (10) |
| 1978–1983 | Hajduk Split | 157 | (22) |
| 1983–1986 | Lille | 107 | (13) |
| 1986–1990 | Cannes | 111 | (14) |
| Total | | 508 | (61) |

International career
| 1976–1980 | Yugoslavia | 14 | (0) |

Managerial career
- 1990–1992: Cannes
- 1992–1993: Valenciennes
- 1994: Guinea
- 2020–2021: Hajduk Split
Medal record
Men's football
Representing Yugoslavia
Mediterranean Games
| Gold medal – first place | 1979 Split | Team |
- * Club domestic league appearances and goals

Boro Primorac (pronounced [bǒːro prǐːmorats]; born 5 December 1954) is a Bosnian professional football manager and former player who most recently managed Croatian First Football League club Hajduk Split.

== Playing career ==
=== Club ===
Primorac featured as a centre half with Yugoslavian clubs Velež Mostar and Hajduk Split, as well as for French teams Lille and Cannes.

=== International ===
Primorac played at the senior level for Yugoslavia whom he captained in the late 1970s. He made his debut for them in a February 1976 friendly match away against Tunisia and has earned a total of 14 caps, scoring no goals. Primorac went on to be triumphant as Yugoslavia won the gold medal in football at the 1979 Mediterranean Games. He also was a part of the Yugoslavian squad which got to the semi-finals of the 1980 Summer Olympics. All together Primorac was capped a sum of 18 times for Yugoslavia. His final international was a November 1980 World Cup qualification match against Italy.

== Managerial career ==
After his playing days came to an end, Primorac went on to manage French clubs AS Cannes and Valenciennes. He then worked under Frenchman Arsène Wenger at Grampus Eight in Japan before joining him at Highbury in March 1997. He then served under Wenger within the role of assistant coach at Arsenal.

On 4 November 2020, Primorac was appointed manager of Croatian club Hajduk Split, which was his first job as a head coach after 26 years. He was intended to be a caretaker, but after 7 points won in 3 matches he had extended the contract to the end of the year. However, Hajduk lost all of its three matches until the end of December and Primorac's contract was not extended again, so he was replaced by Paolo Tramezzani in January 2021.

== Managerial statistics ==
As of match played 20 December 2020

| Team | From | To | Record | | | | |
| Team | From | To | G | W | D | L | Win % |
|---|---|---|---|---|---|---|---|
| Cannes | 1 July 1990 | 30 June 1992 | 89 | 28 | 31 | 30 | 31.46 |
| Valenciennes | 29 August 1992 | 30 June 1993 | 39 | 10 | 12 | 17 | 25.64 |
| Guinea | 1 January 1994 | 30 July 1994 | 5 | 1 | 1 | 3 | 20.00 |
| Hajduk Split | 4 November 2020 | 18 January 2021 | 6 | 2 | 1 | 3 | 33.33 |
| Total | | | 139 | 41 | 45 | 53 | 29.5 |

== Personal life ==
Primorac is an ethnic Bosnian Croat. He is reportedly fluent in nine languages; his native Bosnian and Croatian, French, English, Japanese, German, Spanish, Portuguese and Italian. His son Jure Primorac is also a professional footballer.

== Honours ==
=== Player ===
==== International ====
Yugoslavia

- Mediterranean Games: 1979
