= Blaž Slišković =

Bosnian football manager (born 1959)

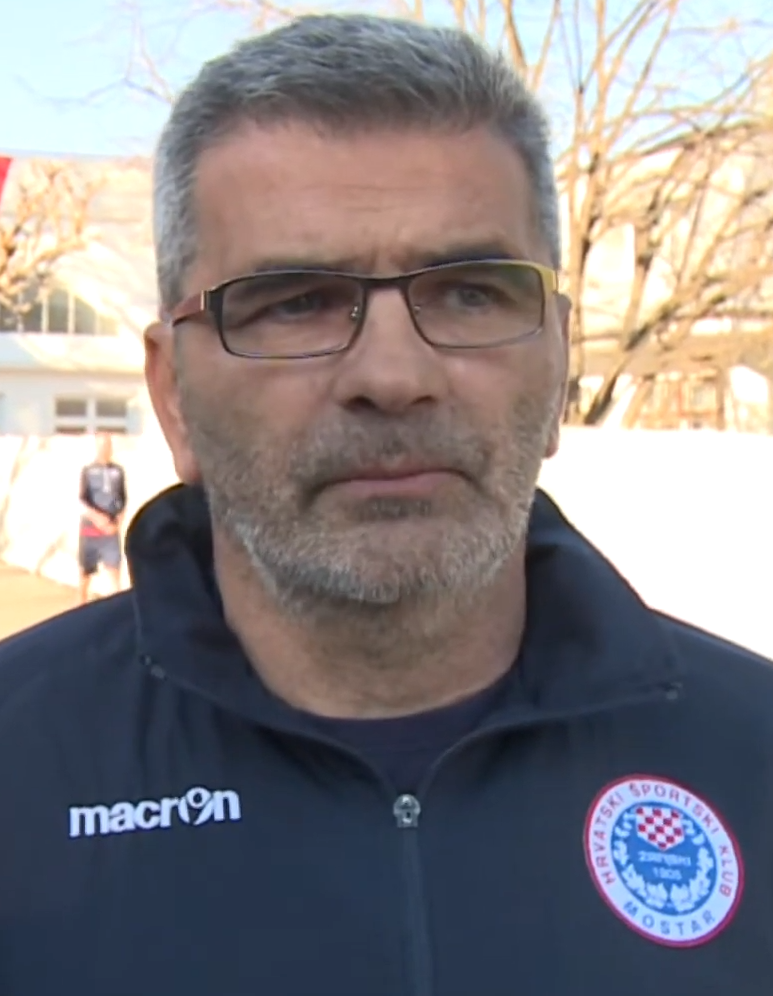
- Slišković with Zrinjski Mostar in 2019

Personal information
- Date of birth: 30 May 1959 (age 67)
- Place of birth: Mostar, FR Bosnia and Herzegovina, FPR Yugoslavia
- Height: 1.77 m (5 ft 10 in)
- Position: Midfielder

Senior career*
Years	Team	Apps	(Gls)
1976–1981	Velež Mostar	123	(25)
1981–1986	Hajduk Split	101	(21)
1986–1987	Marseille	29	(6)
1987–1988	Pescara	23	(8)
1988–1989	Lens	15	(1)
1989–1990	Mulhouse	27	(8)
1991–1992	Rennes	22	(0)
1992–1993	Pescara	18	(2)
1993–1995	Hrvatski Dragovoljac	5	(0)
1996–1997	Zrinjski Mostar		
Total		363	(71)

International career
1978–1986	Yugoslavia	26	(3)
1993	Bosnia and Herzegovina XI	3	(0)

Managerial career
- 1997–1998: Hrvatski Dragovoljac
- 1998–1999: Zrinjski Mostar
- 1999–2000: Brotnjo
- 2002–2006: Bosnia and Herzegovina
- 2004–2005: Hajduk Split
- 2005–2007: Zrinjski Mostar
- 2008: Tirana
- 2010: Unirea Alba Iulia
- 2011: Široki Brijeg
- 2011: Al-Ansar
- 2012: Qingdao Jonoon
- 2015: Široki Brijeg
- 2017–2018: Zrinjski Mostar
- 2018–2019: Zrinjski Mostar
- 2019–2020: Kitchee
- 2021: Željezničar
Medal record
Men's football
Representing Yugoslavia
UEFA Euro U-21 Championship
Gold medal – first place	UEFA U-21 Euro	1978
Mediterranean Games
Gold medal – first place	1979 Split	Team
- * Club domestic league appearances and goals

Blaž "Baka" Slišković (pronounced [blâːʒ slîʃkoʋitɕ]; born 30 May 1959) is a Bosnian professional football manager and former player who played as a midfielder. Nicknamed the "Balkan Maradona", he was admired for his composure and flair on the ball.

Slišković is most known for his time playing at hometown club Velež Mostar, Hajduk Split, Marseille and Pescara. He was capped 26 times for Yugoslavia in the late 1970s and early 1980s.

Regarded as one of the most successful Bosnian football managers, Slišković's most memorable moments came as manager of the Bosnia and Herzegovina national team, and during his spells at Zrinjski Mostar. He narrowly missed out on qualifying the country for UEFA Euro 2004 after a draw against Denmark in the final qualifying match, and later guided Zrinjski to consecutive Bosnian Premier League titles in 2017 and 2018.

== Club career ==
During his playing days, Slišković was considered one of the most technically gifted players of his generation. In 1985, he was named the Yugoslav Footballer of the Year. He had the most success while playing for hometown club Velež Mostar and Croatian club Hajduk Split. With Velež, Slišković won the 1980–81 Yugoslav Cup and the 1980–81 Balkans Cup, while with Hajduk he won the 1983–84 Yugoslav Cup and was also part of the Hajduk team that made it all the way to the semi-finals of the 1983–84 UEFA Cup.

Slišković was most famous while playing for French Ligue 1 club Marseille. After Marseille, Slišković played in Italy with Pescara, before returning to France and playing for Lens, Mulhouse and Rennes. In 1992, he returned to Italy and came back to Pescara. In 1993, Slišković left Italy and joined Croatian club Hrvatski Dragovoljac, where he stayed until 1995. Finally, in 1996 he joined Bosnian club Zrinjski Mostar, where he eventually finished his career in 1997 at the age of 38.

In 2011, for the 100th anniversary of Hajduk Split, Slišković was chosen in the "Hajduk Split Best 11 of all-time".

== International career ==
Although most experts expected Slišković to make a great international career, he was only capped 26 times for Yugoslavia. He scored three goals in the process. Slišković was prevented from playing in the 1982 FIFA World Cup due to an injury, sustained in the second half during a 1981–82 Yugoslav First League match between OFK Beograd and Hajduk Split. He then lost his place in the UEFA Euro 1984 Yugoslav squad after, allegedly, a Yugoslav-printed newspaper journalist quoted Slišković incorrectly after an interview after a friendly game between Yugoslavia and Switzerland (0–2) and caused the national team head coach, Todor Veselinović, to drop him from the squad. His final international was a November 1986 European Championship qualification match away against England.

Slišković began to play for the Bosnia and Herzegovina national team after the breakup of Yugoslavia in the early 1990s. He played three unofficial friendly games for Bosnia and Herzegovina in 1993 as the captain in all three games.

== Managerial career ==
Right after ending his playing career, Slišković became the new manager of Hrvatski Dragovoljac in 1997. He managed Dragovoljac until 1998, after which he joined Zrinjski Mostar. In January 1999, Slišković joined Brotnjo and won the Herzeg-Bosnia Cup with the club in May of that same year.

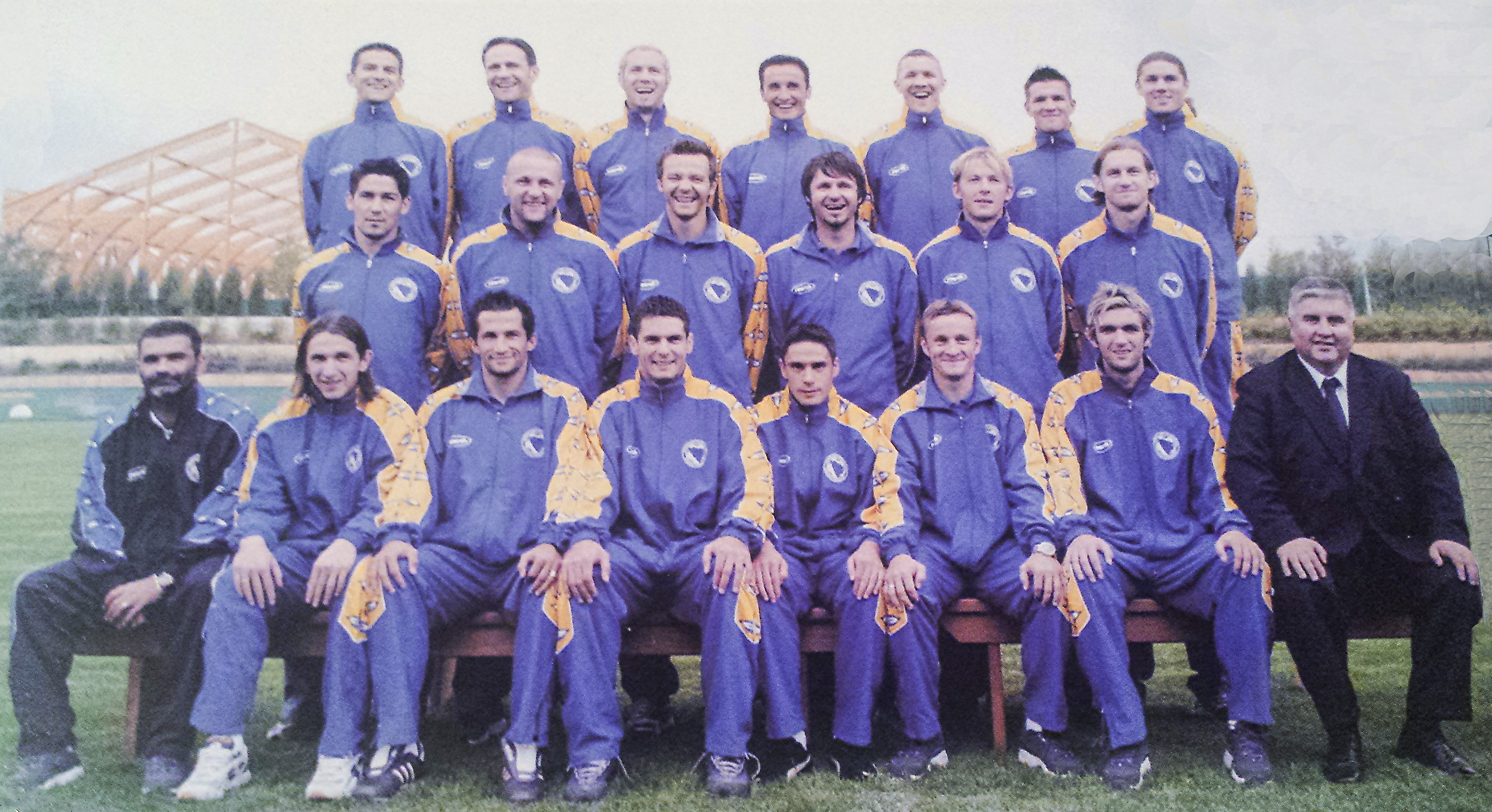
Slišković (sitting, far left) with the Bosnia and Herzegovina squad during UEFA Euro 2004 qualifying

In the winter of 2000, he left Brotnjo and became an assistant manager to Mišo Smajlović in the Bosnia and Herzegovina national team. Slišković became the head coach of the national team in March 2002, after Smajlović left the team because of his contract expiring. Slišković stayed as the head coach until 2006. In 2004, he won the award "Best Bosnia and Herzegovina Coach" by Dnevni avaz and the "Bosnia and Herzegovina Man of the Year" also in 2004. While Bosnia and Herzegovina head coach, on 24 August 2004, Slišković replaced Ivan Katalinić and simultaneously became the new Hajduk Split manager. On 10 April 2005, he got sacked at Hajduk.

From 2005 until 2007, Slišković once again managed Zrinjski Mostar, making decent results. By the summer of 2008, he was appointed manager of Albanian Superliga club Tirana, but shortly after left the club in December of that year. In March 2010, Romanian club Unirea Alba Iulia hired Slišković until the end of the season, replacing Adrian Falub. In April 2011, he again came back to Bosnia and Herzegovina taking the manager position at Bosnian Premier League club Široki Brijeg, reaching the fourth position in the 2010–11 Bosnian Premier League season and qualifying for the 2011–12 UEFA Europa League first qualifying round.

On 19 January 2012, Chinese Super League side Qingdao Jonoon announced that they signed a contract with Slišković to replace South Korean manager Chang Woe-ryong. From April to June 2015, he once again managed Široki Brijeg.

In March 2017, Slišković again took the manager position at Zrinjski Mostar for the third time in his career, eventually leading the team to win the Bosnian Premier League in the 2016–17 season. In the 2017–18 season, he won his second league title in a row with Zrinjski. After winning two league trophies, Slišković left Zrinjski in June 2018. However, after the sacking of new manager Ante Miše, the club asked Slišković to return, which he agreed to on 13 August 2018. After the end of the 2018–19 Bosnian Premier League season, it was announced on 7 June 2019 that Slišković did not come to an agreement with the board of directors of Zrinjski on a contract extension and that he was leaving the club.

Shortly after leaving Zrinjski, on 3 July 2019, Slišković became the new manager of Hong Kong Premier League club Kitchee, signing a two-year contract. On 23 March 2020, he stepped down and transitioned to a consultancy role with the club.

After Amar Osim got sacked as manager by Bosnian Premier League club Željezničar on 11 April 2021 due to poor results, three days later, on 14 April, Slišković was named as its new manager. In his first game as manager, Željezničar drew against Radnik Bijeljina on 18 April 2021. Slišković oversaw his first loss as Željezničar manager on 25 April 2021, in a league game against Olimpik. In his first ever Sarajevo derby, Slišković's Željezničar lost against FK Sarajevo away in a league match on 1 May 2021. Slišković left Željezničar after his contract with the club expired in June 2021.

== Legacy ==
In July 2011, French football manager and former player, Zinedine Zidane, named Slišković as one of his idols while growing up and included him in his "All Time Best 11" of Marseille. Additionally, Gianluigi Buffon, widely regarded as one of the greatest goalkeepers of all time, also revealed Slišković as his first idol during the latter's first stint at Pescara.

== Personal life ==
Slišković was born in Mostar, FPR Yugoslavia, present day Bosnia and Herzegovina, on 30 May 1959 to Bosnian Croat parents. He was married to Bosnian Serb handball player Svetlana Kitić. Slišković's father Vladko played for Velež Mostar for 15 years. Slišković's son Vladimir is also a professional football manager.

== Career statistics ==
=== International goals ===
Scores and results list Yugoslavia's goal tally first, score column indicates score after each Slišković goal.

List of international goals scored by Blaž Slišković
No.	Date	Venue	Opponent	Score	Result	Competition
1	16 September 1979	Marakana, Belgrade, Yugoslavia	Argentina	4–1	4–2	Friendly
2	31 October 1979	Gradski Stadion, Kosovska Mitrovica, Yugoslavia	Romania	2–0	2–1	UEFA Euro 1980 qualifying
3	25 March 1981	Gradski Stadion, Subotica, Yugoslavia	Bulgaria	2–1	2–1	Friendly

== Managerial statistics ==
As of match played 7 May 2021

Managerial record by team and tenure
Team	From	To	Record							
Team	From	To	G	W	D	L	GF	GA	GD	Win %
Bosnia and Herzegovina	27 March 2002	11 October 2006	37	11	11	15	44	56	−12	29.73
Hajduk Split	24 August 2004	10 April 2005	23	14	3	6	41	23	+18	60.87
Zrinjski Mostar	2 August 2005	14 October 2007	82	41	13	28	146	94	+52	50.00
Unirea Alba Iulia	12 March 2010	25 June 2010	14	4	0	10	14	30	−16	28.57
Široki Brijeg	24 March 2011	4 June 2011	12	8	2	2	25	10	+15	66.67
Al-Ansar	1 July 2011	31 October 2011	3	0	0	3	2	6	−4	0.00
Qingdao Jonoon	20 January 2012	13 March 2012	1	0	1	0	0	0	+0	0.00
Široki Brijeg	19 April 2015	30 June 2015	11	3	5	3	19	18	+1	27.27
Zrinjski Mostar	23 March 2017	11 June 2018	45	26	11	8	76	40	+36	57.78
Zrinjski Mostar	13 August 2018	7 June 2019	34	19	9	6	52	26	+26	55.88
Kitchee	3 July 2019	22 March 2020	20	11	5	4	44	22	+22	55.00
Željezničar	14 April 2021	1 June 2021	4	0	1	3	4	9	−5	0.00
Total			286	137	61	88	467	334	+133	47.90

== Honours ==
=== Player ===
Velež Mostar

- Yugoslav Cup: 1980–81
- Balkans Cup: 1980–81

Hajduk Split

- Yugoslav Cup: 1983–84

Yugoslavia U21

- UEFA Euro U-21 Championship: 1978

Yugoslavia

- Mediterranean Games: 1979

Individual

- Yugoslav Footballer of the Year: 1985
- Hajduk Split all-time first 11: 2011

=== Manager ===
Brotnjo

- Herzeg-Bosnia Cup: 1998–99

Široki Brijeg

- Bosnian Cup runner-up: 2014–15

Zrinjski Mostar

- Bosnian Premier League: 2016–17, 2017–18

Individual

- Bosnian Coach of the Year: 2003, 2018
- Bosnia and Herzegovina Man of the Year: 2004
- Best Bosnia and Herzegovina Coach by Dnevni avaz: 2004
- Bosnian Premier League Manager of the Season: 2017–18
