= Zdenko Adamović =

Croatian football manager and player

Personal information
- Date of birth: 20 December 1963 (age 62)
- Place of birth: Osijek, SFR Yugoslavia
- Position: Forward

Senior career*
Years	Team	Apps	(Gls)
1981–1985	Hajduk Split	45	(7)
1985	Osijek	15	(1)
1986	Vojvodina	12	(2)
1986–1987	Hajduk Split	22	(6)
1988	Osijek	5	(0)
1988–1990	Čelik Zenica	25	(3)
1992–1993	SpVgg Bayreuth	15	(9)
1993–1994	FC Augsburg	1	(0)
1995–1996	Primorac (S)	22	(5)
1996	Uskok		
1996–1997	DOŠK		

Managerial career
- 2008–2009: Zmaj Makarska
- 2013: Primorac Stobreč
- 2014-: BŠK Zmaj
- NK DOŠK Drniš
- 2015: Sloga Ljubuški
- 2015-2016: HNK Val Kaštel Stari
- 2017: Belišće
- * Club domestic league appearances and goals

Zdenko Adamović (born 20 December 1963, in Osijek) is a Croatian football manager and former player.

== Playing career ==
During his career, he played for some important Yugoslav clubs, such as NK Osijek, Hajduk Split, FK Vojvodina, and Čelik Zenica, before moving to Germany where he played for SpVgg Bayreuth and FC Augsburg.

== Managerial career ==
He was appointed manager of Sloga Ljubuški in March 2015, took charge of NK Val in July 2015 and coached Belišće in 2017.
