= Nenad Šalov =

Croatian footballer

Personal information
- Date of birth: 6 October 1955 (age 71)
- Place of birth: Split, FPR Yugoslavia
- Position: Midfielder

Senior career*
| Years | Team | Apps | (Gls) |
| 1973–1985 | Hajduk Split | 201 | (19) |
| 1985–1986 | Viktoria Aschaffenburg | 41 | (5) |
| 1986–1987 | SV Darmstadt 98 | 14 | (1) |
| 1987–1988 | Sportfreunde DJK Freiburg | 17 | (5) |
| 1989–1990 | 1. FSV Mainz 05 | 18 | (4) |
| 1990–1992 | Viktoria Aschaffenburg | | |

International career
| 1980 | Yugoslavia | 1 | (0) |

Managerial career
- 1992–1997: Viktoria Aschaffenburg
- 2002–2003: SV Babelsberg 03
- 2003–2006: Viktoria Aschaffenburg
- * Club domestic league appearances and goals

Nenad Šalov (born 6 October 1955 in Split, SFR Yugoslavia) is a Croatian retired midfielder who played for SFR Yugoslavia.

== International career ==
Šalov made his debut and played his only match for Yugoslavia in a November 1980 World Cup qualification match against Italy.

== Honours ==
Yugoslav First League:

- 1973–74, 1974–75, 1978–79

Yugoslav Cup:

- 1974, 1975–76, 1976–77, 1983–84
