= Ivan Gudelj =

Croatian footballer (1960–2026)

Personal information
- Date of birth: 21 April 1960
- Place of birth: Imotski, PR Croatia, FPR Yugoslavia
- Date of death: 2 September 2026 (aged 66)
- Place of death: Zagreb, Croatia
- Position: Midfielder

Youth career
- 1975–1976: NK Mračaj
- 1976–1979: Hajduk Split

Senior career*
Years	Team	Apps	(Gls)
1979–1986	Hajduk Split	180	(38)

International career
1980–1986	Yugoslavia	33	(3)

Managerial career
- Croatia U16
- 1992: Primorac Stobreč
- Uskok
- 1993: Zadar
- NK Dubrovnik
- Vorwärts Steyr
- 2005–2013: Croatia U17
- 2005–2006: Croatia U17
- 2013–2014: Croatia U19
- * Club domestic league appearances and goals

Ivan Gudelj (21 April 1960 – 2 September 2026) was a Croatian footballer who played as a midfielder for Hajduk Split. A full international for Yugoslavia, his career was cut short at age 25 after collapsing during a match with Hajduk Split against Red Star Belgrade. It turned out to be a hepatitis infection.

== Club career ==
Zmijavci-raised Gudelj started his player career in a club from the neighbouring village of Runovići – NK Mračaj. There, he was coached by Marinko Boban, the father of future football star Zvonimir Boban. A few years later, Gudelj went to play for Hajduk Split, for which he played 362 games in total, scoring 93 goals, in the 1976–1986 period. He quickly marked himself out as a dependable and elegant defensive midfielder, earning the moniker "Beckenbauer from Zmijavci" in the Yugoslav press.

The rising career of a new European football star ended suddenly. Gudelj was forced to end his career because of health problems, more specifically, hepatitis B. The twenty-six-year-old played his last game against Red Star Belgrade in Split on 23 September 1986 at the start of the 1986–87 league season. His precontract with Girondins de Bordeaux was never realized.

== International career ==
=== Youth ===
In 1979, eighteen-year-old Gudelj had a busy summer.

First, in June 1979, he played for Yugoslavia at the UEFA European Under-18 Football Championship in Vienna, leading his country to the championship trophy, beating Bulgaria in the final. Gudelj got named the tournament's best player.

Later that summer in August 1979, Gudelj made the Yugoslavia squad that participated at the FIFA World Youth Championship held in Japan. Playing in a tough group featuring Argentina with 18-year-old Diego Maradona, Yugoslavia failed to progress to the next stage.

=== Full squad ===
Gudelj's excellent outings for the national youth team drew the attention of national team head coach Miljan Miljanić who called Gudelj up for the full squad the following year.

He made his senior debut for Yugoslavia in a September 1980 World Cup qualification match away against Luxembourg, coming on as a 85th-minute substitute for Zoran Vujović, and Gudelj quickly became Miljanić's favourite who soon made him the national team captain at the age of 21. In the end, Gudelj made 33 national team appearances, scoring three goals. He was a participant in the 1982 FIFA World Cup and Euro 1984. Because of his excellent games, French magazine L’Équipe put him on their list of ideal team of 1982 World Cup. His final international was a May 1986 friendly match away against Belgium.

Gudelj was also named the Yugoslav Footballer of the Year in 1982.

== Managerial career ==
Gudelj began his coaching career in 1990. As a coach, he led Croatian priests' national team and Croatian cadets national team. With the latter, he won the bronze medal in the Eurochamps 2001 in England (generation of Niko Kranjčar).

Later, he led various clubs. He made it with Primorac from Stobreč, bringing it to Croatian top league. He also led Uskok from Klis, Zadar, Dubrovnik, Austrian club Vorwärts Steyr and Hajduk (replacing Miroslav Blažević in 2005). Before taking charge at Hajduk, Gudelj was manager of the Croatia U17 National Team and successfully led them to a 4th-place finish in the 2005 UEFA European Under-17 Championship in Italy.

== Personal life and death ==
Born in the town of Imotski, Gudelj grew up in the nearby village of Zmijavci. As a child, he considered becoming a Catholic priest.

Also during childhood, he was an extra in the TV Zagreb-produced, 1972 Yugoslav television series Prosjaci i sinovi based on Ivan Raos' novel and filmed in Gudelj's home village Zmijavci. In the escape scene, the youngster distinguished himself from the rest of the children as the fastest one.

Gudelj died on 2 September 2026, aged 66.

== Honours ==
=== Player ===
Hajduk Split

- Yugoslav Cup: 1983–84
