= Dušan Pešić =

Yugoslav footballer

Personal information
- Full name: Dušan Pešić
- Date of birth: 26 April 1955 (age 71)
- Place of birth: Kruševac, FPR Yugoslavia
- Height: 1.78 m (5 ft 10 in)
- Position: Attacking midfielder

Youth career
- Napredak Kruševac

Senior career*
| Years | Team | Apps | (Gls) |
| 1973–1980 | Napredak Kruševac | 175 | (15) |
| 1980–1984 | Hajduk Split | 84 | (21) |
| 1984–1988 | Fenerbahçe | 128 | (18) |
| 1988–1989 | Sakaryaspor | 29 | (6) |
| Total | | 416 | (60) |

International career
| 1979–1980 | Yugoslavia U21 | 2 | (0) |
| 1980 | Yugoslavia Olympic | 3 | (0) |
| 1980–1983 | Yugoslavia | 4 | (0) |
- * Club domestic league appearances and goals

Dušan Pešić (Serbian Cyrillic: Душан Пешић; born 26 April 1955) is a former Yugoslav and Serbian footballer who played as an attacking midfielder.

== Club career ==
Pešić started out at his hometown club Napredak Kruševac, making his senior debut in 1973. He helped the side win promotion to the Yugoslav First League on two occasions (1976 and 1978). In 1980, Pešić was transferred to Hajduk Split. He was a member of the team that won the Yugoslav Cup in the 1983–84 season.

In 1984, Pešić moved abroad to Turkey and signed with Fenerbahçe. He spent four years at the club and won the national championship in his debut season. In 1988, Pešić switched to Sakaryaspor and stayed there for one year.

== International career ==
Between 1980 and 1983, Pešić earned four caps for Yugoslavia at full level. He also represented his country at the 1980 Summer Olympics.

== Career statistics ==
| Club | Season | League | |
| Club | Season | Apps | Goals |
|---|---|---|---|
| Napredak Kruševac | 1972–73 | 1 | 0 |
| Napredak Kruševac | 1973–74 | 16 | 1 |
| Napredak Kruševac | 1974–75 | 33 | 3 |
| Napredak Kruševac | 1975–76 | 24 | 1 |
| Napredak Kruševac | 1976–77 | 22 | 0 |
| Napredak Kruševac | 1977–78 | 16 | 1 |
| Napredak Kruševac | 1978–79 | 32 | 6 |
| Napredak Kruševac | 1979–80 | 31 | 3 |
| Napredak Kruševac | Total | 175 | 15 |

== Honours ==
Napredak Kruševac

- Yugoslav Second League: 1975–76, 1977–78

Hajduk Split

- Yugoslav Cup: 1983–84

Fenerbahçe

- 1.Lig: 1984–85
- Turkish Super Cup: 1985
