= Zoran Vulić =

Croatian footballer and manager

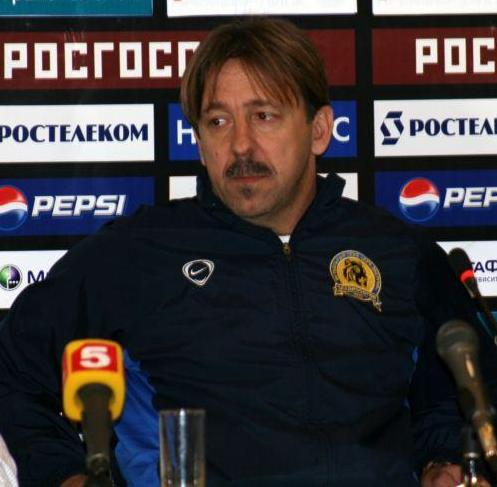
- Vulić as manager at Luch-Energiya in 2008

Personal information
- Full name: Zoran Vulić
- Date of birth: 4 October 1961 (age 65)
- Place of birth: Split, PR Croatia, Yugoslavia
- Height: 1.83 m (6 ft 0 in)
- Position: Defender

Senior career*
Years	Team	Apps	(Gls)
1979–1988	Hajduk Split	167	(25)
1988–1991	Mallorca	95	(11)
1991–1993	Nantes	65	(10)
1993–1995	Hajduk Split	21	(4)
Total		348	(50)

International career
1986–1991	Yugoslavia	25	(1)
1990–1993	Croatia	3	(0)

Managerial career
- 1998: Hajduk Split
- 2000–2001: Hajduk Split
- 2002–2004: Hajduk Split
- 2006–2007: Hajduk Split
- 2008: Luch-Energiya
- 2009: Rijeka
- 2010: Istra 1961
- 2010–2011: Istra 1961
- 2012–2013: RNK Split
- 2014: Croatia U19
- 2014–2015: RNK Split
- 2015–2016: Sheriff Tiraspol
- 2016–2017: Atyrau
- 2017: Apollon Smyrnis
- 2018: Hajduk Split
- 2022: Xanthi
- * Club domestic league appearances and goals

Zoran Vulić (Croatian pronunciation: [zǒran ʋǔːlitɕ]; born 4 October 1961) is a Croatian professional football manager and former player who played as a defender. He is notable for having managed Hajduk Split five separate times between 1998 and 2018, which is a record among all Hajduk managers.

== Playing career ==
=== Club ===
Vulić was born in Split. He is the son of Ante, a famous goalkeeper for Hajduk Split in the 1950s. Zoran Vulić joined Hajduk Split as a stopper with a powerful shot, and played for the club for nine seasons. He played a total of 167 league games and scored 25 goals. He successfully continued his career abroad, with stints at RCD Mallorca and FC Nantes in the following five years. He was instrumental in Mallorca's return to the La Liga during his debut season. He played 35 matches and scored five times.

Vulić returned to Hajduk in 1993 and retired after two years with the club, at age 34. In his first stint with the club, he conquered two Yugoslav Cups in 1984 and 1987, and in his second stint two Croatian Leagues in 1994 and 1995, and one cup in 1995.

=== International ===
Vulić won 25 caps for Yugoslavia, scoring once, and participated at the 1990 World Cup in Italy, where he played four of the team's five matches. His national team debut was on 30 April 1986, when Yugoslavia lost 4–2 to Brazil in a friendly match.

He also played in three friendly matches for Croatia: in October 1990 against the United States and in June 1991 against Slovenia, both unofficial since Croatia was still part of Yugoslavia at the time, as well as against Ukraine in June 1993.

=== International goals ===
Results list Yugoslavia's and Croatia's goal tallies first.

#	Date	Venue	Opponent	Score	Result	Competition
Yugoslavia goals
1	16 May 1991	Red Star Stadium, Belgrade, Yugoslavia	Faroe Islands	6–0	7–0	Euro 1992 qualifying

== Managerial career ==
In 1998, Vulić continued his career as manager, with his first four spells all at Hajduk Split. His biggest success as Hajduk manager was winning the 2000–01 Croatian First League and the 2002–03 Croatian Cup. In 2004, he was sacked three rounds before the end of the 2003–04 Croatian First League season even though the team was sitting at the top of the table, and he was replaced by the new manager, Petar Nadoveza, who ended up winning that championship with Hajduk.

In January 2008, Vulić moved to Russian Premier League club FC Luch-Energiya Vladivostok. He returned to Croatia in 2009, taking over HNK Rijeka. In February 2010, he took charge of Istra 1961. Vulić also managed RNK Split on two occasions. His biggest success with that team was reaching the final of the 2014–15 Croatian Cup where they were beaten on penalties by Dinamo Zagreb.

In 2015, he took over Sheriff Tiraspol and managed to win the 2015–16 Moldovan National Division. He left the club in June 2016. On 14 December 2016, Vulić was appointed as manager of FC Atyrau. On 11 April 2017, the club announced a mutually agreed contract termination, as Vulić wanted to return to Croatia. He was then manager of Apollon Smyrnis from September to December 2017, when he was sacked after a poor run of results.

His final stint with Hajduk was from 9 September to 27 November 2018, when he was sacked after having won only 3 of the 9 league matches. In February 2022 he was named manager of Greek second-tier side Xanthi, but was relieved of his duties after only a month.

Additionally, Vulić also served as an assistant coach of the Croatia national team.

== Managerial statistics ==
As of 25 November 2018

Managerial record by team and tenure
Team	From	To	Record							
Team	From	To	G	W	D	L	GF	GA	GD	Win %
Hajduk Split	1998	1998	5	1	2	2	7	10	−3	20.00
Hajduk Split	2000	2001	36	22	7	7	80	26	+54	61.11
Hajduk Split	2002	2004	82	54	13	15	151	61	+90	65.85
Hajduk Split	2006	2007	31	22	4	5	59	23	+36	70.97
Hajduk Split	2017	2018	11	5	4	2	16	12	+4	45.45
Total			165	104	30	31	313	132	+181	63.03

== Honours ==
=== Player ===
Hajduk Split

- Croatian First League: 1993–94, 1994–95
- Croatian Cup: 1994–95
- Yugoslav Cup: 1983–84, 1986–87

=== Manager ===
Hajduk Split

- Croatian First League: 2000–01
- Croatian Cup: 2002–03

Sheriff Tiraspol

- Moldovan National Division: 2015–16
