= Mladen Bogdanović =

Yugoslav footballer

Personal information
- Date of birth: 3 October 1960
- Place of birth: Sarajevo, Yugoslavia
- Date of death: 22 June 2003 (aged 42)
- Place of death: Koprivnica, Croatia
- Position: Forward

Senior career*
Years	Team	Apps	(Gls)
1979–1983	Hajduk Split	87	(11)
1984	Čelik Zenica (loan)		
1984–1988	Dinamo Vinkovci	66	(1)
1988–1989	Borac Banja Luka		
1989-1993	Slaven Bilokalnik		
Total		188	(53)
- * Club domestic league appearances and goals

Mladen Bogdanović (3 October 1960 – 22 June 2003) was a Yugoslav footballer who played as a forward and a winger. Nicknamed Kemo, he started his senior team career in 1979 with Hajduk Split Following his playing career, he worked as a coach at the Slaven Belupo (then called Slaven Bilokalnik) Football School.

His most notable matches are Hajduk's victory against VfB Stuttgart in the 1981-82 UEFA Cup (3–1, 2–2).

== Death ==
On 19 May 2003, Bogdanović was injured in a traffic accident while riding a bicycle and later died from his injuries.

== Personal life ==
He has a son, Andrija, who is a futsal player.
