= Davor Čop =

Croatian footballer and manager

Personal information
- Date of birth: 31 October 1958 (age 67)
- Place of birth: Rijeka, PR Croatia, FPR Yugoslavia
- Height: 1.82 m (5 ft 11 1/2 in)
- Position: Forward

Team information
- Current team: BŠK Zmaj Blato (manager)

Youth career
- 1973–1976: Hajduk Split

Senior career*
Years	Team	Apps	(Gls)
1976–1980	Hajduk Split	87	(15)
1980–1982	Napredak Kruševac	38	(17)
1982–1984	Hajduk Split	26	(4)
1984–1987	Dinamo Vinkovci	61	(32)
1987–1988	Empoli	9	(0)
1988–1990	Dinamo Vinkovci	70	(30)
1990–1994	Cibalia	49	(14)
Total		340	(112)

Managerial career
- 2000–2001: Cibalia
- 2004: Virovitica
- 2007: Trogir
- 2007–2008: Solin
- 2008–2009: Val
- 2009: Junak Sinj
- 2011–2012: Hrvace
- 2012–2013: Jadran Kaštel Sućurac
- 2013: Jadran Luka Ploče
- 2013: Zmaj Blato
- 2013–: Zagora Unešić
- 2017: Val
- * Club domestic league appearances and goals

Davor Čop (born 31 October 1958) is a Croatian retired football player and current head of Val's football academy.

== Managerial career ==
Čop took charge of Jadran Kaštel Sućurac in June 2012 and he was appointed manager of Zagora Unešić in October 2013, after leading Zmaj Blato.

== Personal life ==
His son Duje is a professional football player and also plays as a forward.

== Honours ==
Hajduk Split

- Yugoslav First League: 1978–79
- Yugoslav Cup: 1976–77, 1983–84

Individual

- Yugoslav First League top scorer: 1985–86
