= Zoran Vujović =

Croatian retired footballer (born 1958)

Personal information
- Date of birth: 26 August 1958 (age 68)
- Place of birth: Sarajevo, PR Bosnia and Herzegovina, FPR Yugoslavia
- Height: 1.79 m (5 ft 10 in)
- Position: Defender

Senior career*
Years	Team	Apps	(Gls)
1976–1986	Hajduk Split	232	(38)
1986–1988	Bordeaux	78	(3)
1989	Cannes	7	(0)
1989–1990	Red Star Belgrade	15	(0)
1990–1991	Stade Vallauris	10	(0)
1991–1992	Cannes	14	(0)
1992–1993	Nice	15	(0)
Total		371	(41)

International career
1979–1989	Yugoslavia	34	(2)

Managerial career
- 2007–2008: KAC
- 2013: KAC
- 2019: Gol Gohar (assistant)
Medal record
Men's football
Representing Yugoslavia
Mediterranean Games
Gold medal – first place	1979 Split	Team
- * Club domestic league appearances and goals

Zoran Vujović (Croatian pronunciation: [zòran ʋûːjoʋitɕ]; born 26 August 1958) is a Croatian retired footballer who played as a defender.

His twin brother, Zlatko, is also a former professional footballer. They were both Yugoslav internationals, and both spent a large part of their professional careers in France.

== Playing career ==
=== Club ===
Vujović was born in Sarajevo. After starting his professional career at Hajduk Split, alongside his brother Zlatko, he (whom amassed nearly 400 overall appearances, scoring a career-best ten league goals in 32 games in the 1980–81 season as his team ranked in second position) moved aged 28 to France, where he would remain the next seven years safe for a short spell at Red Star Belgrade. His first stop – having been bought at the same time as his sibling – was FC Girondins de Bordeaux, as both were instrumental figures in the club's double in their first season.

Vujović retired in 1993 with OGC Nice, having his first coaching experience in 2007 in Morocco with KAC Kénitra.

=== International ===
Internationally he received 34 caps for Yugoslavia, and was a non-playing squad member at the 1982 FIFA World Cup; his debut came in a friendly with Italy, on 13 June 1979. He competed for Yugoslavia at the 1980 Summer Olympics. His final international was a September 1989 friendly match against Greece.
