= Zlatko Vujović =

Croatian footballer (born 1958)

Personal information
- Date of birth: 26 August 1958 (age 68)
- Place of birth: Sarajevo, PR Bosnia and Herzegovina, FPR Yugoslavia
- Height: 1.79 m (5 ft 10 in)
- Position: Forward

Senior career*
| Years | Team | Apps | (Gls) |
| 1976–1986 | Hajduk Split | 240 | (101) |
| 1986–1988 | Bordeaux | 65 | (20) |
| 1988–1989 | Cannes | 34 | (18) |
| 1989–1991 | Paris Saint-Germain | 62 | (20) |
| 1991–1992 | Sochaux | 23 | (4) |
| 1992–1993 | Nice | 28 | (17) |
| Total | | 452 | (180) |

International career
| 1979–1990 | Yugoslavia | 70 | (25) |

Managerial career
- 2008–2009: Hajduk Split (assistant)
- 2011: Hajduk Split (assistant)
- 2016: Hajduk Split (assistant)
Medal record
Men's football
Representing Yugoslavia
Mediterranean Games
| Gold medal – first place | 1979 Split | Team |
- * Club domestic league appearances and goals

Zlatko Vujović (Croatian pronunciation: [zlâtko ʋûːjoʋitɕ]; born 26 August 1958) is a Yugoslav retired footballer who played as a forward.

His twin brother, Zoran, was also a professional footballer. They were both Yugoslav internationals, and both spent a large part of their professional careers in France.

== Club career ==
Born in Sarajevo, Vujović started his professional career with Hajduk Split, making his first division debuts at just 18 and going on to score more than 100 goals in the league (172 overall in 420 matches), while often partnering his brother Zoran. He helped his first club win one league in 1979 and one cup five years later, also being named Yugoslav Footballer of the Year in 1981 by the Večernji list daily.

In 1986, both siblings moved to compete in France, first with Bordeaux: in their first season both were undisputed starters in an eventual double, as Zlatko also scored in the 2–0 cup win against Marseile.

Vujović continued to net with at excellent rate until he retired in 1993, playing in both the first and second levels, with Cannes, Paris Saint-Germain, Sochaux and Nice.

== International career ==
Vujović earned 70 caps and scored 25 goals for the Yugoslavia national team, making his debut on 1 April 1979 in a 3–0 win against Cyprus for the UEFA Euro 1980 qualifiers, and was included in the squads for the 1982 and 1990 FIFA World Cups while also playing Olympic football in 1980. His final international was a November 1990 European Championship qualification win away against Denmark.

== Managerial career ==
In 2008, Vujović (as had his brother the previous year) began a coaching career, starting as an assistant manager at his first club, Hajduk. He began his third stint in July 2016, when he joined Marijan Pušnik's staff but he left the club in December 2016 after Pušnik was sacked.

== Career statistics ==
Scores and results list Yugoslavia's goal tally first, score column indicates score after each Vujović goal.

List of international goals scored by Zlatko Vujović
| No. | Date | Venue | Opponent | Score | Result | Competition | Ref. |
|---|---|---|---|---|---|---|---|
| 1 | 1 April 1979 | Makario Stadium, Nicosia, Cyprus | Cyprus | 1–0 | 3–0 | UEFA Euro 1980 qualification | |
| 2 | 1 April 1979 | Makario Stadium, Nicosia, Cyprus | Cyprus | 2–0 | 3–0 | UEFA Euro 1980 qualification | |
| 3 | 31 October 1979 | Trepča Stadium, Mitrovica, Kosovo | Romania | 1–0 | 2–1 | UEFA Euro 1980 qualification | |
| 4 | 14 November 1979 | Karađorđe Stadium, Novi Sad, Serbia | Cyprus | 3–0 | 5–0 | UEFA Euro 1980 qualification | |
| 5 | 22 March 1980 | Koševo City Stadium, Sarajevo, Bosnia and Herzegovina | Uruguay | 2–0 | 2–1 | Friendly | |
| 6 | 10 September 1980 | Stade Municipal. Luxembourg City, Luxembourg | Luxembourg | 2–0 | 5–0 | 1982 FIFA World Cup qualification | |
| 7 | 10 September 1980 | Stade Municipal. Luxembourg City, Luxembourg | Luxembourg | 4–0 | 5–0 | 1982 FIFA World Cup qualification | |
| 8 | 29 April 1981 | Gradski stadion u Poljudu, Split, Croatia | Greece | 4–0 | 5–1 | 1982 FIFA World Cup qualification | |
| 9 | 29 April 1981 | Gradski stadion u Poljudu, Split, Croatia | Greece | 5–0 | 5–1 | 1982 FIFA World Cup qualification | |
| 10 | 9 September 1981 | Idrætspark, Copenhagen, Denmark | Denmark | 2–1 | 2–1 | 1982 FIFA World Cup qualification | |
| 11 | 17 October 1981 | Red Star Stadium, Belgrade, Serbia | Italy | 1–0 | 1–1 | 1982 FIFA World Cup qualification | |
| 12 | 21 November 1981 | Karađorđe Stadium, Novi Sad, Serbia | Luxembourg | 5–0 | 5–0 | 1982 FIFA World Cup qualification | |
| 13 | 12 October 1983 | JNA Stadium, Belgrade, Serbia | Norway | 1–0 | 2–1 | UEFA Euro 1984 qualification | |
| 14 | 25 January 1985 | Maharaja College Stadium, Kochi, India | Soviet Union | 2–0 | 2–1 | 1985 Nehru Cup | |
| 15 | 16 October 1985 | Linzer Stadion, Linz, Austria | Austria | 1–0 | 3–0 | Friendly | |
| 16 | 16 October 1985 | Linzer Stadion, Linz, Austria | Austria | 3–0 | 3–0 | Friendly | |
| 17 | 19 May 1986 | King Baudouin Stadium, Brussels, Belgium | Belgium | 3–0 | 3–1 | Friendly | |
| 18 | 29 October 1986 | Gradski stadion u Poljudu, Split, Croatia | Turkey | 1–0 | 4–0 | UEFA Euro 1988 qualification | |
| 19 | 29 October 1986 | Gradski stadion u Poljudu, Split, Croatia | Turkey | 2–0 | 4–0 | UEFA Euro 1988 qualification | |
| 20 | 29 October 1986 | Gradski stadion u Poljudu, Split, Croatia | Turkey | 4–0 | 4–0 | UEFA Euro 1988 qualification | |
| 21 | 29 April 1987 | Windsor Park, Belfast, Northern Ireland | Northern Ireland | 2–1 | 2–1 | UEFA Euro 1988 qualification | |
| 22 | 5 April 1989 | Spyros Louis Stadium, Marousi, Greece | Greece | 1–0 | 4–1 | Friendly | |
| 23 | 5 April 1989 | Spyros Louis Stadium, Marousi, Greece | Greece | 4–1 | 4–1 | Friendly | |
| 24 | 14 June 1989 | Ullevaal Stadion, Oslo, Norway | Norway | 2–0 | 2–1 | 1990 FIFA World Cup qualification | |
| 25 | 6 September 1989 | Stadion Maksimir, Zagreb, Croatia | Scotland | 3–1 | 3–1 | 1990 FIFA World Cup qualification | |
