= 1999–2000 HNK Hajduk Split season =

Hajduk Split
1999–2000 season
- Chairman: Željko Kovačević
- Manager: Ivan Katalinić; Ivica Matković; Petar Nadoveza
- Prva HNL: 2nd
- Croatian Cup: Winners
- UEFA Cup: First round
- Top goalscorer: League: Mate Baturina (13); All: Mate Baturina (17)
- Highest home attendance: 30,000 vs Croatia Zagreb (23 October 1999)
- Lowest home attendance: 0 (Three matches)
- Average home league attendance: 5,313

The 1999–2000 season was the defensive and major changing in Hajduk Split’s history and their ninetieth in the Prva HNL. Their 3rd place finish in the 1998–99 season meant it was their 9th successive season playing in the Prva HNL.

== Competitions ==
=== Overall record ===
Performance by competition
| Competition | Starting round | Final position/round | First match | Last match |
|---|---|---|---|---|
| Prva HNL | —N/a | Runners-up | 28 July 1999 | 13 May 2000 |
| Croatian Football Cup | First round | Winners | 22 September 1999 | 16 May 2000 |
| UEFA Cup | Qualifying round | First round | 12 August 1999 | 30 September 1999 |

Statistics by competition
| Competition | Pld | W | D | L | GF | GA | GD | Win% |
|---|---|---|---|---|---|---|---|---|
| Prva HNL | 33 | 17 | 10 | 6 | 58 | 30 | +28 | 51.52 |
| Croatian Football Cup | 8 | 5 | 2 | 1 | 19 | 6 | +13 | 62.50 |
| UEFA Cup | 4 | 1 | 2 | 1 | 6 | 3 | +3 | 25.00 |
| Total | 45 | 23 | 14 | 8 | 83 | 39 | +44 | 51.11 |

=== Prva HNL ===
==== Classification ====
| Pos | Team | Pld | W | D | L | GF | GA | GD | Pts | Qualification or relegation |
|---|---|---|---|---|---|---|---|---|---|---|
| 1 | Dinamo Zagreb (C) | 33 | 23 | 6 | 4 | 83 | 25 | +58 | 75 | Qualification to Champions League third qualifying round |
| 2 | Hajduk Split | 33 | 17 | 10 | 6 | 58 | 30 | +28 | 61 | Qualification to Champions League second qualifying round |
| 3 | Osijek | 33 | 15 | 8 | 10 | 55 | 49 | +6 | 53 | Qualification to UEFA Cup first round |
| 4 | Rijeka | 33 | 14 | 7 | 12 | 54 | 39 | +15 | 49 | Qualification to UEFA Cup qualifying round |
| 5 | Slaven Belupo | 33 | 12 | 13 | 8 | 34 | 34 | 0 | 49 | Qualification to Intertoto Cup first round |

Source: RSSSF.org
Rules for classification: 1st points; 2nd goal difference; 3rd goals scored
For deciding champions, qualification to UEFA competitions and relegation: 1st points; 2nd head-to-head points; 3rd head-to-head goal difference; 4th head-to-head away goals scored
(C) Champions

==== Results summary ====
| Overall | | | | | | | | Home | | | | | | Away | | | | | |
| Pld | W | D | L | GF | GA | GD | Pts | W | D | L | GF | GA | GD | W | D | L | GF | GA | GD |
|---|---|---|---|---|---|---|---|---|---|---|---|---|---|---|---|---|---|---|---|
| 33 | 17 | 10 | 6 | 58 | 30 | +28 | 61 | 11 | 4 | 2 | 32 | 15 | +17 | 6 | 6 | 4 | 26 | 15 | +11 |

Last updated: 13 May 2000.
Source: Sportnet.hr

==== Results by round ====
| Round | 1 | 2 | 3 | 4 | 5 | 6 | 7 | 8 | 9 | 10 | 11 | 12 | 13 | 14 | 15 | 16 | 17 | 18 | 19 | 20 | 21 | 22 | 23 | 24 | 25 | 26 | 27 | 28 | 29 | 30 | 31 | 32 | 33 |
|---|---|---|---|---|---|---|---|---|---|---|---|---|---|---|---|---|---|---|---|---|---|---|---|---|---|---|---|---|---|---|---|---|---|
| Ground | A | H | A | H | A | H | A | H | A | A | H | H | A | H | A | H | A | H | A | H | H | A | H | A | H | A | H | A | H | A | H | H | A |
| Result | L | W | W | W | W | W | D | W | W | D | D | W | W | W | W | W | W | W | L | L | D | D | D | D | W | D | L | D | W | L | W | D | L |
| Position | 9 | 5 | 3 | 1 | 1 | 1 | 2 | 2 | 2 | 2 | 2 | 2 | 2 | 2 | 2 | 2 | 1 | 1 | 1 | 2 | 2 | 2 | 2 | 2 | 2 | 2 | 2 | 2 | 2 | 2 | 2 | 2 | 2 |

Source: Competitive matches
A = Away; H = Home; W = Win; D = Draw; L = Loss

==== Results by opponent ====
| Team | Results | | | Points |
| Team | 1 | 2 | 3 | Points |
|---|---|---|---|---|
| Cibalia | 2–2 | 1–1 | 0–0 | 3 |
| Dinamo Zagreb | 1–1 | 0–0 | 1–3 | 2 |
| Hrvatski Dragovoljac | 5–0 | 0–3 | 0–0 | 9 |
| Istra | 1–0 | 5–0 | 1–1 | 4 |
| Osijek | 5–4 | 0–2 | 1–0 | 6 |
| Rijeka | 2–1 | 3–2 | 0–2 | 6 |
| Slaven Belupo | 0–0 | 1–0 | 0–0 | 5 |
| Šibenik | 3–1 | 3–1 | 0–3 | 6 |
| Varteks | 2–3 | 2–0 | 0–0 | 4 |
| Vukovar '91 | 2–0 | 2–0 | 4–2 | 9 |
| NK Zagreb | 3–0 | 3–0 | 5–0 | 9 |

Source: 1999–2000 Croatian First Football League article

== Matches ==
=== Prva HNL ===
| 28 July 1999 1 | Varteks | 3–2 | Hajduk Split | Varaždin |
| 20:00 CEST (UTC+02:00) | Golubica 25'; Dalić 55'; Šafarić 87' | Report | Sablić 71'; Pralija 78' | Stadium: Stadion Varteks; Attendance: 6,000; Referee: Pero Radić (Rijeka) |

| 1 August 1999 2 | Hajduk Split | 3–1 | Šibenik | Split |
| 20:00 CEST (UTC+02:00) | Baturina 20'; Musa 28'; Lalić 44' | Report | Marasović 84' | Stadium: Stadion Poljud; Attendance: 6,000; Referee: Reno Sinovčić (Zadar) |

| 29 August 1999 3 | Rijeka | 1–2 | Hajduk Split | Rijeka |
| 19:00 CEST (UTC+02:00) | Agić 13' | Report | Musa 43'; Bilić 65' | Stadium: Stadion Kantrida; Attendance: 7,000; Referee: Miroslav Vitković (Vinkovci) |

| 7 September 1999 4 | Hajduk Split | 1–0 | Istra | Split |
| 19:00 CEST (UTC+02:00) | Bulat (yellow card) 39' (yellow-red card) 72'; Jažić 60' | Report | Černjul (red card) 90' | Stadium: Stadion Poljud; Attendance: 5,000; Referee: Goran Marić (Zagreb) |

| 11 September 1999 5 | Vukovar '91 | 0–2 | Hajduk Split | Vukovar |
| 17:00 CEST (UTC+02:00) | | Report | Vučko 71' (pen.); Bilić 83' | Stadium: Gradski stadion u Borovu Naselju; Attendance: 5,000; Referee: Goran Marić (Zagreb) |

| 19 September 1999 6 | Hajduk Split | 3–0 | NK Zagreb | Split |
| 18:00 CEST (UTC+02:00) | Leko 13'; Vučko 40' (pen.), 55' | Report | Lovrek (yellow card) 40' (yellow-red card) 57'; Biškup (yellow card) 82' (yellow-red card) 85' | Stadium: Stadion Poljud; Attendance: 7,000; Referee: Ante Kulušić (Šibenik) |

| 25 September 1999 7 | Slaven Belupo | 0–0 | Hajduk Split | Koprivnica |
| 16:00 CEST (UTC+02:00) | | Report | | Stadium: Gradski stadion Attendance: 3,000; Referee: Hrvoje Kurtović (Osijek) |

| 3 October 1999 8 | Hajduk Split | 5–4 | Osijek | Split |
| 16:30 CEST (UTC+02:00) | Mujdža 22'; Leko 58'; Vučko 60', 64' (pen.); Baturina 81' | Report | Vranješ 17', 49'; Bubalo 23'; Vučko 68' (o.g.) | Stadium: Stadion Poljud; Attendance: 6,000; Referee: Nikola Petir (Kašina) |

| 12 October 1999 9 | Hrvatski Dragovoljac | 0–5 | Hajduk Split | Slavonski Brod |
| 16:00 CEST (UTC+02:00) | | Report | Baturina 29'; Deranja 31', 69'; Vučko 53'; Bulat 81' | Stadium: Stadion Stanko Vlajnić-Dida; Attendance: 1,500; Referee: Pero Radić (Rijeka) |

| 16 October 1999 10 | Cibalia | 2–2 | Hajduk Split | Vinkovci |
| 15:30 CEST (UTC+02:00) | Čutura 68'; Tkalčević 71' | Report | Musa 24'; Bilić 80' | Stadium: Stadion HNK Cibalia; Attendance: 6,000; Referee: Goran Marić (Zagreb) |

| 23 October 1999 11 | Hajduk Split | 1–1 | Croatia Zagreb | Split |
| 17:00 CEST (UTC+02:00) | H. Vuković (yellow card) 54' (red card) 85'; Lalić 90' | Report | Jurčić (yellow card) 16' (red card) 85'; Šokota 54' | Stadium: Stadion Poljud; Attendance: 30,000; Referee: Ivica Katuša (Čakovec) |

| 30 October 1999 12 | Hajduk Split | 2–0 | Varteks | Split |
| 15:00 CEST (UTC+02:00) | Deranja 63'; Bilić 90' | Report | Tukser (red card) 23' | Stadium: Stadion Poljud; Attendance: 4,000; Referee: Miro Marijanović (Osijek) |

| 6 November 1999 13 | Šibenik | 1–3 | Hajduk Split | Šibenik |
| 14:00 CET (UTC+01:00) | Antolić (yellow card) 19' (yellow-red card) 58'; Slavica (red card) 33'; Putnik 38' | Report | Deranja 10'; Baturina 80'; Leko 85' | Stadium: Stadion Šubićevac; Attendance: 4,000; Referee: Ivan Novak (Varaždin) |

| 23 November 1999 14 | Hajduk Split | 3–2 | Rijeka | Split |
| 16:30 CET (UTC+01:00) | Baturina 47', 52'; Leko 86' | Report | Sztipánovics 7'; Mijatović (red card) 12'; Balaban 90' | Stadium: Stadion Poljud; Attendance: 3,500; Referee: Darko Feljan (Zagreb) |

| 27 November 1999 15 | Istra | 0–5 | Hajduk Split | Pula |
| 13:30 CET (UTC+01:00) | | Report | Baturina 6', 88'; Vučko 34'; Deranja 40'; Puljiz 48' | Stadium: Stadion Aldo Drosina; Attendance: 4,000; Referee: Ivica Katuša (Čakovec) |

| 4 December 1999 16 | Hajduk Split | 2–0 | Vukovar '91 | Split |
| 16:00 CET (UTC+01:00) | Sesar 24' (o.g.); Leko 30' | Report | | Stadium: Stadion Poljud; Attendance: 6,000; Referee: Goran Marić (Zagreb) |

| 19 February 2000 17 | NK Zagreb | 0–3 | Hajduk Split | Zagreb |
| 13:00 CET (UTC+01:00) | | Report | Leko 15' (pen.), 83'; Musa 90' | Stadium: Stadion Kranjčevićeva; Attendance: 2,500; Referee: Draženko Kovačić (Križevci) |

| 26 February 2000 18 | Hajduk Split | 1–0 | Slaven Belupo | Split |
| 15:00 CET (UTC+01:00) | Musa 61' | Report | | Stadium: Stadion Poljud; Attendance: 6,000; Referee: Miro Marijanović (Osijek) |

| 29 February 2000 19 | Osijek | 2–0 | Hajduk Split | Osijek |
| 16:00 CET (UTC+01:00) | Turković 45'; Bubalo 73' | Report | Deranja (yellow card) 43' (yellow-red card) 60' | Stadium: Stadion Gradski vrt Attendance: 5,000; Referee: Miroslav Vitković (Vinkovci) |

| 4 March 2000 20 | Hajduk Split | 0–3 (1–0) (Awarded) | Hrvatski Dragovoljac | Split |
| 15:00 CET (UTC+01:00) | Leko 45'; Matić (yellow card) (yellow-red card) 90' | Report | | Stadium: Stadion Poljud; Attendance: 4,000; Referee: Nebojša Trošelj (Rijeka) |
Note: Match awarded to Hrvatski Dragovoljac because was Hajduk fielded suspended player Srđan Andrić, who was transferred two yellow cards from Mosor.

| 7 March 2000 21 | Hajduk Split | 1–1 | Cibalia | Split |
| 15:00 CET (UTC+01:00) | Baturina 85' | Report | Čutura (yellow card) 12' (yellow-red card) 64'; Meštrović 63' | Stadium: Stadion Poljud; Attendance: 3,000; Referee: Ante Kulušić (Šibenik) |

| 11 March 2000 22 | Dinamo Zagreb | 0–0 | Hajduk Split | Zagreb |
| 15:30 CET (UTC+01:00) | | Report | | Stadium: Stadion Maksimir; Attendance: 30,000; Referee: Hrvoje Kurtović (Osijek) |

| 18 March 2000 23 | Hajduk Split | 0–0 | Slaven Belupo | Split |
| 15:30 CET (UTC+01:00) | | Report | Amižić (yellow card) 27' (yellow-red card) 29' | Stadium: Stadion Poljud; Attendance: 2,000; Referee: Nikola Petir (Kašina) |

| 25 March 2000 24 | Hrvatski Dragovoljac | 0–0 | Hajduk Split | Zaprešić |
| 15:30 CET (UTC+01:00) | | Report | Jazić (yellow card) 74' (yellow-red card) 80' | Stadium: Stadion ŠRC Zaprešić; Attendance: 4,000; Referee: Draženko Kovačić (Križevci) |

| 1 April 2000 25 | Hajduk Split | 4–0 | Vukovar '91 | Split |
| 16:30 CEST (UTC+02:00) | Musa 10'; Leko 40'; Baturina 47', 69' | Report | | Stadium: Stadion Poljud; Attendance: 3,000; Referee: Ante Kulušić (Šibenik) |

| 8 April 2000 26 | Istra | 1–1 | Hajduk Split | Pula |
| 16:30 CEST (UTC+02:00) | Nosek 36'; Dobrić (yellow card) 41' (yellow-red card) 43' | Report | H. Vuković (yellow card) 64' (yellow-red card) 86'; Leko 80' | Stadium: Stadion Aldo Drosina; Attendance: 4,000; Referee: Darko Feljan (Zagreb) |

| 11 April 2000 27 | Hajduk Split | 0–3 (1–2) (Awarded) | Šibenik | Split |
| 18:30 CEST (UTC+02:00) | Bulat (red card) 31'; Antolić 58' (o.g.) | Report | K. Vuković 31', 79'; Bakula (yellow card) 45' (yellow-red card) 63' | Stadium: Stadion Poljud; Attendance: 4,000; Referee: Goran Marić (Zagreb) |
Note: Match abandoned after 81 minutes due to crowd trouble. Later the match was awarded to Šibenik.

| 15 April 2000 28 | Cibalia | 0–0 | Hajduk Split | Vinkovci |
| 16:30 CEST (UTC+02:00) | | Report | | Stadium: Stadion HNK Cibalia; Attendance: 2,000; Referee: Darko Feljan (Zagreb) |

| 24 April 2000 29 | Hajduk Split | 5–0 | NK Zagreb | Split |
| 16:30 CEST (UTC+02:00) | Baturina 45', 90'; Bilić 57', 88'; Leko 85' | Report | | Stadium: Stadion Poljud; Attendance: 0 Referee: Ivan Novak (Varaždin) |

| 29 April 2000 30 | Rijeka | 2–0 | Hajduk Split | Rijeka |
| 18:30 CEST (UTC+02:00) | Gjuzelov 41' (o.g.); Hasančić 56' | Report | | Stadium: Stadion Kantrida; Attendance: 6,000; Referee: Goran Marić (Zagreb) |

| 6 May 2000 31 | Hajduk Split | 1–0 | Osijek | Split |
| 17:00 CEST (UTC+02:00) | Ergović 24' (o.g.) | Report | | Stadium: Stadion Poljud; Attendance: 0 Referee: Goran Marić (Zagreb) |

| 9 May 2000 32 | Hajduk Split | 0–0 | Varteks | Split |
| 17:00 CEST (UTC+02:00) | | Report | | Stadium: Stadion Poljud; Attendance: 0 Referee: Hrvoje Kurtović (Osijek) |

| 13 May 2000 33 | Dinamo Zagreb | 3–1 | Hajduk Split | Zagreb |
| 17:00 CEST (UTC+02:00) | Bišćan 20'; Sedloski 28'; Šokota 47'; Mikić (red card) 83' | Report | Srna (red card) 83'; Deranja 84' | Stadium: Stadion Maksimir; Attendance: 18,000; Referee: Ivica Katuša (Čakovec) |

Source: hajduk.hr

=== Croatian Football Cup ===
| 22 September 1999 R1 | Moslavac Popovača | 0–8 | Hajduk Split | Popovača |
| | | Report | Miše 6'; Deranja 10'; Grdic 15'; Skoko 25'; Musa 52'; Baturina 64', 90'; Matić 72' | Stadium: Sportski park Attendance: 1,000; Referee: Nebojša Trošelj (Rijeka) |

| 27 October 1999 R2 | Hajduk Split | 3–1 | Šibenik | Split |
| 15:00 CEST (UTC+02:00) | Baturina 9'; Bilić 38'; Skoko 43' | Report | Harmat 8' | Stadium: Stadion Poljud; Attendance: 2,000; Referee: Goran Marić (Zagreb) |

| 14 March 2000 QF | Slaven Belupo | 0–0 | Hajduk Split | Koprivnica |
| 15:30 CET (UTC+01:00) | | Report | | Stadium: Gradski stadion Attendance: 3,000; Referee: Darko Feljan (Zagreb) |

| 21 March 2000 QF | Hajduk Split | 2–1 (2–1 agg.) | Slaven Belupo | Split |
| 15:30 CET (UTC+01:00) | Vučević 6'; Ribić 22' | Report | Dodik 37'; Bošnjak (red card) 89' | Stadium: Stadion Poljud; Attendance: 3,000; Referee: Nikola Petir (Kašina) |

| 4 April 2000 SF | Hajduk Split | 2–1 | NK Zagreb | Split |
| 18:15 CEST (UTC+02:00) | Ratković (yellow card) 1' (yellow-red card) 2'; Musa 62'; Bilić 85' | Report | Osibov (yellow card) 8' (yellow-red card) 9'; Bule 40' | Stadium: Stadion Poljud; Attendance: 4,000; Referee: Miroslav Vitković (Vinkovci) |

| 18 April 2000 SF | NK Zagreb | 2–2 (3–4 agg.) | Hajduk Split | Zagreb |
| 15:30 CEST (UTC+02:00) | Osibov 15'; Kosić 34' | Report | Vučko 44'; Mihačić 54' (o.g.); Andrić (yellow card) 66' (yellow-red card) 88' | Stadium: Stadion Kranjčevićeva; Attendance: 3,500; Referee: Željko Širić (Osijek) |

| 2 May 2000 Final | Hajduk Split | 2–0 | Dinamo Zagreb | Split |
| 18:00 CEST (UTC+02:00) | Vučko 38' (pen.), 53' | Report | | Stadium: Stadion Poljud; Attendance: 20,000; Referee: Draženko Kovačić (Križevci) |
Note: Match abandoned after 86 minutes due to mass fight between both clubs' supporters and the police. The match was a registered with 2:0 Hajduk's win and the club was punished by having their three matches behind closed doors.

| 16 May 2000 Final | Dinamo Zagreb | 1–0 (1–2 agg.) | Hajduk Split | Zagreb |
| 18:30 CEST (UTC+02:00) | I. Cvitanović 90+2' | Report | Vučko (yellow card) 25' (yellow-red card) 75' | Stadium: Stadion Maksimir; Attendance: 17,000; Referee: Željko Širić (Osijek) |

Source: hajduk.hr

=== UEFA Cup ===
==== Qualifying round ====
| 12 August 1999 First leg | Hajduk Split (Croatia) | 5–0 | (Luxembourg) F91 Dudelange | Varaždin, Croatia |
| 20:15 CEST (UTC+02:00) | Bulat 4'; Baturina 24'; Grdic 57'; Leko 68'; Deranja 90' | Report | | Stadium: Stadion Varteks; Attendance: 5,000; Referee: Kamen Alexiev (Bulgaria) |

| 26 August 1999 Second leg | F91 Dudelange (Luxembourg) | 1–1 (1–6 agg.) | (Croatia) Hajduk Split | Dudelange, Luxembourg |
| 18:30 CEST (UTC+02:00) | Kabongo 49' | Report | Jazić 51' | Stadium: Stade Jos Nosbaum; Attendance: 1,000; Referee: Khagani Mammadov (Azerbaijan) |

==== First round ====
| 16 September 1999 First leg | Hajduk Split (Croatia) | 0–0 | (Bulgaria) Levski Sofia | Split, Croatia |
| 17:45 CEST (UTC+02:00) | | Report | | Stadium: Stadion Poljud; Attendance: 11,627; Referee: Pasquale Rodomonti (Italy) |

| 30 September 1999 Second leg | Levski Sofia (Bulgaria) | 3–0 (3–0 agg.) | (Croatia) Hajduk Split | Sofia, Bulgaria |
| 15:45 EEST (UTC+03:00) | Ivankov 16' (pen.); Bachev 33'; Dimitrov 85' | Report | | Stadium: Georgi Asparuhov Stadium; Attendance: 24,000; Referee: Michael Riley (England) |

Source: hajduk.hr

== Player seasonal records ==
=== Top scorers ===
| Rank | Name | League | Europe | Cup | Total |
|---|---|---|---|---|---|
| 1 | (Croatia) Mate Baturina | 13 | 1 | 3 | 17 |
| 2 | (Croatia) Ivan Leko | 10 | 1 | – | 11 |
| 3 | (Croatia) Jurica Vučko | 7 | – | 3 | 10 |
| 4 | (Croatia) Mate Bilić | 6 | – | 2 | 8 |
| 4 | (Croatia) Zvonimir Deranja | 6 | 1 | 1 | 8 |
| 4 | (Croatia) Igor Musa | 6 | – | 2 | 8 |
| 7 | (Croatia) Josip Bulat | 1 | 1 | – | 2 |
| 7 | (Australia) Anthony Grdic | – | 1 | 1 | 2 |
| 7 | (Canada) Ante Jazić | 1 | 1 | – | 2 |
| 7 | (Croatia) Vik Lalić | 2 | – | – | 2 |
| 7 | (Australia) Josip Skoko | – | – | 2 | 2 |
| 12 | (Croatia) Stipe Matić | – | – | 1 | 1 |
| 12 | (Croatia) Ante Miše | – | – | 1 | 1 |
| 12 | (Bosnia and Herzegovina) Jasmin Mujdža | 1 | – | – | 1 |
| 12 | (Croatia) Nenad Pralija | 1 | – | – | 1 |
| 12 | (Croatia) Jurica Puljiz | 1 | – | – | 1 |
| 12 | (Croatia) Goran Sablić | 1 | – | – | 1 |
| 12 | (Croatia) Josip Ribić | – | – | 1 | 1 |
| 12 | (Croatia) Goran Vučević | – | – | 1 | 1 |
| | Own goals | 2 | – | 1 | 3 |
| | TOTALS | 58 | 6 | 19 | 84 |

Source: Competitive matches

== See also ==
- 1999–2000 Croatian First Football League
- 1999–2000 Croatian Football Cup

== External sources ==
- 1999–2000 Prva HNL at HRnogomet.com
- 1999–2000 Croatian Cup at HRnogomet.com
- 1999–2000 UEFA Cup at rsssf.com
