= 2006–07 HNK Hajduk Split season =

Hajduk Split
2006–07 season
- Chairman: Branko Grgić
- Manager: Zoran Vulić (until 9 April 2007); Ivan Pudar
- Prva HNL: 2nd
- Croatian Cup: Semi-finals
- Top goalscorer: League: Mladen Bartolović, Tomislav Bušić (11); All: Mladen Bartolović, Tomislav Bušić (13)
- Highest home attendance: 34,000 vs Dinamo Zagreb (1 October 2006)
- Lowest home attendance: 700 vs Belišće (24 October 2006)
- Average home league attendance: 7,765
Home colours	Away colours

The 2006–07 season was the 96th season in Hajduk Split’s history and their sixteenth in the Prva HNL. Their 5th place finish in the 2005–06 season meant it was their 16th successive season playing in the Prva HNL.

== First-team squad ==
Squad at end of season

Note: Flags indicate national team as defined under FIFA eligibility rules; some limited exceptions apply. Players may hold more than one non-FIFA nationality.

No.	Pos.	Nation	Player
1	GK	CRO	Zlatko Runje
3	DF	HUN	Miklós Gaál
4	MF	BIH	Dario Damjanović
5	DF	CRO	Jurica Buljat
6	DF	CRO	Boris Živković
7	DF	CRO	Vlatko Đolonga
8	MF	CRO	Igor Musa
9	FW	CRO	Nikica Jelavić
11	MF	CRO	Mario Carević (on loan from VfB Stuttgart)
11	FW	CRO	Nikola Kalinić
12	GK	CRO	Vladimir Balić
13	FW	CRO	Jurica Vučko
14	MF	CRO	Drago Gabrić
15	MF	CRO	Marin Ljubičić

No.	Pos.	Nation	Player
16	FW	BIH	Mladen Bartolović
17	DF	CRO	Tonči Žilić
18	MF	BIH	Mirko Hrgović
20	MF	URU	Pablo Munhoz
21	FW	CRO	Ante Rukavina
22	DF	CRO	Igor Gal
26	DF	CRO	Goran Rubil
27	DF	CRO	Filip Marčić
28	DF	BIH	Boris Pandža
29	DF	CRO	Mladen Pelaić
30	FW	CRO	Tomislav Bušić
—	FW	CRO	Duje Čop
—	MF	CRO	Niko Peraić
—	MF	CRO	Zoran Plazonić

=== Left club during season ===
Note: Flags indicate national team as defined under FIFA eligibility rules; some limited exceptions apply. Players may hold more than one non-FIFA nationality.

No.	Pos.	Nation	Player
10	MF	CRO	Niko Kranjčar (to Portsmouth)
19	FW	BIH	Dragan Blatnjak (to Khimki)
21	DF	CRO	Darko Miladin (to Ergotelis)

No.	Pos.	Nation	Player
23	DF	MKD	Igor Kralevski (to Luch-Energiya)
24	MF	CRO	Josip Balatinac (released)
27	DF	CRO	Luka Vučko (to Rijeka)

== Competitions ==
=== Overall record ===
Performance by competition
Competition	Starting round	Final position/round	First match	Last match
Prva HNL	—N/a	Runners-up	29 July 2006	19 May 2007
Croatian Football Cup	First round	Semi-final	20 September 2006	4 April 2007

Statistics by competition
Competition	Pld	W	D	L	GF	GA	GD	Win%
Prva HNL	33	22	6	5	60	25	+35	66.67
Croatian Football Cup	6	4	1	1	16	9	+7	66.67
Total	39	26	7	6	76	34	+42	66.67

=== Prva HNL ===
==== Classification ====
Pos	Team	Pld	W	D	L	GF	GA	GD	Pts	Qualification or relegation
1	Dinamo Zagreb (C)	33	30	2	1	84	22	+62	92	Qualification to Champions League first qualifying round
2	Hajduk Split	33	22	6	5	60	25	+35	72	Qualification to UEFA Cup first qualifying round
3	NK Zagreb	33	18	4	11	57	40	+17	58	Qualification to Intertoto Cup first round
4	Šibenik	33	14	7	12	50	47	+3	49	
5	Slaven Belupo (Note: Qualified for Europe as 2006–07 Croatian Football Cup finalists.)	33	14	7	12	40	37	+3	49	Qualification to UEFA Cup first qualifying round

Source: prva-hnl.hr (in Croatian)
Rules for classification: 1) points; 2) goal difference; 3) number of goals scored.
(C) Champions

==== Results summary ====
Overall								Home						Away					
Pld	W	D	L	GF	GA	GD	Pts	W	D	L	GF	GA	GD	W	D	L	GF	GA	GD
33	22	6	5	60	25	+35	72	13	3	1	40	8	+32	9	3	4	20	17	+3

Last updated: 19 May 2007.
Source: Sportnet.hr

==== Results by round ====
Round	1	2	3	4	5	6	7	8	9	10	11	12	13	14	15	16	17	18	19	20	21	22	23	24	25	26	27	28	29	30	31	32	33
Ground	A	H	A	H	A	A	H	A	H	A	H	H	A	H	A	H	H	A	H	A	H	A	H	A	H	A	H	A	H	A	H	H	A
Result	W	W	W	W	W	W	W	L	D	W	W	W	D	W	L	W	W	W	W	L	W	D	W	W	L	W	W	W	D	D	W	D	L
Position	2	1	1	2	2	2	2	2	2	2	2	2	2	2	2	2	2	2	2	2	2	2	2	2	2	2	2	2	2	2	2	2	2

Source: Competitive matches
A = Away; H = Home; W = Win; D = Draw; L = Loss

==== Results by opponent ====
Team	Results			Points
Team	1	2	3	Points
Cibalia	2–0	0–0	1–0	7
Dinamo Zagreb	2–2	1–2	0–3	1
Kamen Ingrad	3–2	4–0	4–0	9
Međimurje	2–0	2–0	4–2	9
Osijek	0–1	3–0	2–1	6
Pula	2–0	0–0	0–1	4
Rijeka	1–0	3–0	2–2	7
Slaven Belupo	2–2	1–0	2–0	7
Šibenik	2–1	3–0	2–2	7
Varteks	3–1	1–0	2–0	9
NK Zagreb	1–0	0–3	3–1	6

Source: 2006–07 Croatian First Football League article

== Matches ==
=== Prva HNL ===
29 July 2006 1	Međimurje	0–2	Hajduk Split	Čakovec
18:00 CEST (UTC+02:00)		Report	Jelavić 9'; Bušić 69'	Stadium: Stadion SRC Mladost; Attendance: 4,000; Referee: Nikola Petir (Kašina)

5 August 2006 2	Hajduk Split	2–0	Cibalia	Split
20:00 CEST (UTC+02:00)	Kranjčar 47' (pen.); Musa 88'	Report		Stadium: Stadion Poljud; Attendance: 10,000; Referee: Alen Gerek (Zabok)

12 August 2006 3	Kamen Ingrad	2–3	Hajduk Split	Velika
20:15 CEST (UTC+02:00)	Sivonjić 34'; Brajković 56'; Tomić (yellow card) 54' (yellow-red card) 65'	Report	Bartolović 27'; Kranjčar 52'; Munhoz 73'	Stadium: Stadion Kamen Ingrad; Attendance: 3,500; Referee: Ivan Bebek (Rijeka)

19 August 2006 4	Hajduk Split	2–0	NK Zagreb	Split
20:15 CEST (UTC+02:00)	Bartolović 30', 37'	Report		Stadium: Stadion Poljud; Attendance: 20,000; Referee: Vlado Svilokos (Sisak)

26 August 2006 5	Rijeka	0–1	Hajduk Split	Rijeka
20:15 CEST (UTC+02:00)		Report	Kranjčar 29'	Stadium: Stadion Kantrida; Attendance: 6,000; Referee: Draženko Kovačić (Križevci)

9 September 2006 6	Slaven Belupo	0–1	Hajduk Split	Koprivnica
16:30 CEST (UTC+02:00)		Report	Carević 36' (pen.)	Stadium: Gradski stadion Attendance: 4,000; Referee: Marin Mlinar (Zagreb)

16 September 2006 7	Hajduk Split	3–1	Varteks	Split
20:15 CEST (UTC+02:00)	Balatinac 37', 59'; Bartolović 38'	Report	Šafarić 11' (pen.)	Stadium: Stadion Poljud; Attendance: 12,000; Referee: Marijo Strahonja (Zagreb)

23 September 2006 8	Osijek	1–0	Hajduk Split	Osijek
20:15 CEST (UTC+02:00)	Vitaić 90+6'	Report		Stadium: Stadion Gradski vrt Attendance: 10,000; Referee: Bruno Marić (Daruvar)

1 October 2006 9	Hajduk Split	2–2	Dinamo Zagreb	Split
20:15 CEST (UTC+02:00)	Carević 31' (pen.), (yellow card) 18' (yellow-red card) 57'; Munhoz 84' (pen.)	Report	Eduardo 39' (pen.); Vugrinec 70'	Stadium: Stadion Poljud; Attendance: 34,000; Referee: Draženko Kovačić (Križevci)

14 October 2006 10	Šibenik	1–2	Hajduk Split	Šibenik
15:30 CEST (UTC+02:00)	Rukavina 4'; Čagalj (yellow card) 77' (yellow-red card) 90'	Report	Balatinac 24'; Musa 66'	Stadium: Stadion Šubićevac; Attendance: 8,000; Referee: Vlado Svilokos (Sisak)

21 October 2006 11	Hajduk Split	2–0	Pula	Split
20:05 CEST (UTC+02:00)	Balatinac 13' (pen.); Bartolović 55'	Report		Stadium: Stadion Poljud; Attendance: 4,500; Referee: Ivan Bebek (Rijeka)

28 October 2006 12	Hajduk Split	2–0	Međimurje	Split
20:15 CEST (UTC+02:00)	Blatnjak 31'; Munhoz 51'	Report		Stadium: Stadion Poljud; Attendance: 6,000; Referee: Bruno Marić (Daruvar)

4 November 2006 13	Cibalia	0–0	Hajduk Split	Vinkovci
14:00 CET (UTC+01:00)		Report		Stadium: Stadion HNK Cibalia; Attendance: 2,000; Referee: Igor Pristovnik (Zagreb)

8 November 2006 14	Hajduk Split	4–0	Kamen Ingrad	Split
16:00 CET (UTC+01:00)	Musa 7'; Bušić 36'; Bartolović 41'; Blatnjak 54'	Report	Lazarevski (yellow card) 20' (red card) 90+2'	Stadium: Stadion Poljud; Attendance: 2,000; Referee: Zlatko Šimčić (Koprivnica)

11 November 2006 15	NK Zagreb	3–0	Hajduk Split	Zagreb
14:15 CET (UTC+01:00)	Lovrek 40', 68'; Mandžukić 90'	Report	Živković (yellow card) 13' (red card) 81'	Stadium: Stadion Kranjčevićeva; Attendance: 4,000; Referee: Ivan Bebek (Rijeka)

18 November 2006 16	Hajduk Split	3–0	Rijeka	Split
20:15 CET (UTC+01:00)	Carević 7'; Bušić 17', 42'	Report		Stadium: Stadion Poljud; Attendance: 6,500; Referee: Alen Gerek (Zabok)

25 November 2006 17	Hajduk Split	2–0	Slaven Belupo	Split
16:00 CET (UTC+01:00)	Munhoz 50'; Bartolović 76'	Report		Stadium: Stadion Poljud; Attendance: 4,500; Referee: Marin Mlinar (Zagreb)

2 December 2006 18	Varteks	0–1	Hajduk Split	Varaždin
16:00 CET (UTC+01:00)		Report	Carević 32'	Stadium: Stadion Varteks; Attendance: 5,000; Referee: Igor Pristovnik (Zagreb)

17 February 2007 19	Hajduk Split	3–0	Osijek	Split
15:00 CET (UTC+01:00)	Bartolović 16'; Bušić 20', 36'	Report		Stadium: Stadion Poljud; Attendance: 12,000; Referee: Igor Pristovnik (Zagreb)

24 February 2007 20	Dinamo Zagreb	2–1	Hajduk Split	Zagreb
20:15 CET (UTC+01:00)	Eduardo 20', 38'	Report	Bartolović 84'	Stadium: Stadion Maksimir; Attendance: 30,000; Referee: Vlado Svilokos (Sisak)

3 March 2007 21	Hajduk Split	3–0	Šibenik	Split
20:15 CET (UTC+01:00)	Musa 11'; Bartolović 53'; Bušić 59'	Report		Stadium: Stadion Poljud; Attendance: 6,000; Referee: Marijo Strahonja (Zagreb)

10 March 2007 22	Pula	0–0	Hajduk Split	Pula
15:00 CET (UTC+01:00)		Report		Stadium: Stadion Veruda; Attendance: 3,000; Referee: Ante Vučemilović-Šimunović (Osijek)

17 March 2007 23	Hajduk Split	2–0	Varteks	Split
15:00 CET (UTC+01:00)	Bušić 53'; Gabrić 90+3'	Report		Stadium: Stadion Poljud; Attendance: 4,000; Referee: Vlado Svilokos (Sisak)

31 March 2007 24	Osijek	1–2	Hajduk Split	Osijek
17:00 CEST (UTC+02:00)	Primorac 40'	Report	Jelavić 73'; Musa 84'	Stadium: Stadion Gradski vrt Attendance: 7,000; Referee: Igor Pristovnik (Zagreb)

7 April 2007 25	Hajduk Split	0–1	Pula	Split
16:00 CEST (UTC+02:00)		Report	Radas 52'	Stadium: Stadion Poljud; Attendance: 2,000; Referee: Bruno Marić (Daruvar)

14 April 2007 26	Cibalia	0–1	Hajduk Split	Vinkovci
16:00 CEST (UTC+02:00)		Report	Musa 19'; Jelavić (yellow card) 31' (yellow-red card) 72'	Stadium: Stadion HNK Cibalia; Attendance: 5,000; Referee: Ivan Bebek (Rijeka)

18 April 2007 27	Hajduk Split	4–0	Kamen Ingrad	Split
16:30 CEST (UTC+02:00)	Munhoz 46'; Musa 49'; Bartolović 54'; Čop 89'	Report		Stadium: Stadion Poljud; Attendance: 2,000; Referee: Ivo Krečak (Šibenik)

21 April 2007 28	Međimurje	2–4	Hajduk Split	Čakovec
16:30 CEST (UTC+02:00)	Peraica 14'; Piškor 16'	Report	Jelavić 45', 70'; Gabrić 59'; Munhoz 85'	Stadium: Stadion SRC Mladost; Attendance: 3,300; Referee: Marin Mlinar (Zagreb)

28 April 2007 29	Hajduk Split	1–1	Slaven Belupo	Split
17:30 CEST (UTC+02:00)	Bušić 55'	Report	Radeljić 3'	Stadium: Stadion Poljud; Attendance: 2,000; Referee: Igor Pristovnik (Zagreb)

2 May 2007 30	Šibenik	2–2	Hajduk Split	Šibenik
17:30 CEST (UTC+02:00)	Bulat 61'; Batur 85'	Report	Jelavić 26'; Ljubičić 90+1'	Stadium: Stadion Šubićevac; Attendance: 5,000; Referee: Ivan Bebek (Rijeka)

5 May 2007 31	Hajduk Split	3–1	NK Zagreb	Split
20:15 CEST (UTC+02:00)	Ljubičić 3'; Bušić 14'; Gabrić 90+1'	Report	Pejić 39'	Stadium: Stadion Poljud; Attendance: 2,000; Referee: Bruno Marić (Daruvar)

12 May 2007 32	Hajduk Split	2–2	Rijeka	Split
17:00 CEST (UTC+02:00)	Bušić 19'; Hrgović (red card) 77'; Peraić 90+1'	Report	Budicin 68'; Ivanov 90+1'	Stadium: Stadion Poljud; Attendance: 2,500; Referee: Igor Križarić (Čakovec)

19 May 2007 33	Dinamo Zagreb	3–0	Hajduk Split	Zagreb
20:15 CEST (UTC+02:00)	Eduardo 14', 39', 78'	Report		Stadium: Stadion Maksimir; Attendance: 35,000; Referee: Ivan Bebek (Rijeka)

Source: HRnogomet.com

=== Croatian Football Cup ===
18 September 2006 R1	Mladost Ždralovi	0–3	Hajduk Split	Split
16:00 CEST (UTC+02:00)		Report	Vučko 33', 51'; Ljubičić 57'	Stadium: Stadion Poljud; Attendance: 1,000; Referee: Igor Pristovnik (Zagreb)

24 October 2006 R2	Hajduk Split	5–2 (a.e.t.)	Belišće	Split
16:00 CEST (UTC+02:00)	Jelavić 9'; Vučko 90+3'; Munhoz 97'; Blatnjak 99'; Bušić 109'<	Report	Brezovec 11'; Kolarić 14'	Stadium: Stadion Poljud; Attendance: 700; Referee: Ivo Krečak (Šibenik)

21 November 2006 QF	Cibalia	2–3	Hajduk Split	Vinkovci
14:00 CET (UTC+01:00)	Bagarić 65' (pen.); Žilić 67' (o.g.)	Report	Bušić 30'; Bartolović 32'; Damjanović 90'	Stadium: Stadion HNK Cibalia; Attendance: 1,200; Referee: Vlado Svilokos (Sisak)

6 December 2006 QF	Hajduk Split	3–2 (6–4 agg.)	Cibalia	Split
16:00 CET (UTC+01:00)	Živković 11'; Jelavić 38'; Hrgović 41'	Report	Bagarić 4'; Andričević 13'	Stadium: Stadion Poljud; Attendance: 2,000; Referee: Igor Pristovnik (Zagreb)

14 March 2007 SF	Dinamo Zagreb	1–0	Hajduk Split	Zagreb
20:15 CET (UTC+01:00)	Vugrinec 40'	Report		Stadium: Stadion Maksimir; Attendance: 20,000; Referee: Ivan Bebek (Rijeka)

4 April 2007 SF	Hajduk Split	2–2 (2–3 agg.)	Dinamo Zagreb	Split
17:30 CEST (UTC+02:00)	Damjanović 39'; Bartolović 45'; Pelaić (red card) 88'	Report	Modrić 76'; Tadić 90'	Stadium: Stadion Poljud; Attendance: 30,000; Referee: Vlado Svilokos (Sisak)

Source: HRnogomet.com

== Player seasonal records ==
=== Top scorers ===
Rank	Name	League	Cup	Total
1	(Bosnia and Herzegovina) Mladen Bartolović	11	2	13
1	(Croatia) Tomislav Bušić	11	2	13
3	(Uruguay) Pablo Munhoz	7	1	8
4	(Croatia) Nikica Jelavić	5	2	7
4	(Croatia) Igor Musa	7	–	7
6	(Croatia) Mario Carević	4	–	4
7	(Croatia) Josip Balatinac	3	–	3
7	(Bosnia and Herzegovina) Dragan Blatnjak	2	1	3
7	(Croatia) Drago Gabrić	3	–	3
7	(Croatia) Niko Kranjčar	3	–	3
7	(Croatia) Marin Ljubičić	2	1	3
7	(Croatia) Jurica Vučko	–	3	3
13	(Bosnia and Herzegovina) Dario Damjanović	–	2	2
14	(Croatia) Duje Čop	1	–	1
14	(Bosnia and Herzegovina) Mirko Hrgović	–	1	1
14	(Croatia) Niko Peraić	1	–	1
14	(Croatia) Boris Živković	–	1	1
	TOTALS	60	16	76

Source: Competitive matches

== See also ==
- 2006–07 Croatian First Football League
- 2006–07 Croatian Football Cup

== External sources ==
- 2006–07 Prva HNL at HRnogomet.com
- 2006–07 Croatian Cup at HRnogomet.com
