= 1998–99 HNK Hajduk Split season =

Hajduk Split
1998–99 season
- Chairman: Željko Kovačević
- Manager: Ivan Katalinić
- Prva HNL: 3rd
- Croatian Cup: Semi-finals
- UEFA Cup: First round
- Top goalscorer: League: Zvonimir Deranja (14); All: Zvonimir Deranja (17)
- Highest home attendance: 40,000 vs Rijeka (23 May 1999)
- Lowest home attendance: 1,000 (Two matches)
- Average home league attendance: 11,875

The 1998–99 season was the 88th season in Hajduk Split’s history and their eighth in the Prva HNL. Their 2nd place finish in the 1997–98 season meant it was their 8th successive season playing in the Prva HNL.

== Competitions ==
=== Overall record ===
Performance by competition
| Competition | Starting round | Final position/round | First match | Last match |
|---|---|---|---|---|
| Prva HNL | —N/a | 3rd | 7 August 1998 | 26 May 1999 |
| Croatian Football Cup | First round | Semi-final | 6 September 1998 | 17 March 1999 |
| UEFA Cup | Second qualifying round | First round | 11 August 1998 | 28 September 1998 |

Statistics by competition
| Competition | Pld | W | D | L | GF | GA | GD | Win% |
|---|---|---|---|---|---|---|---|---|
| Prva HNL | 32 | 17 | 9 | 6 | 62 | 32 | +30 | 53.13 |
| Croatian Football Cup | 6 | 4 | 1 | 1 | 13 | 6 | +7 | 66.67 |
| UEFA Cup | 4 | 1 | 2 | 1 | 4 | 4 | +0 | 25.00 |
| Total | 42 | 22 | 12 | 8 | 79 | 42 | +37 | 52.38 |

=== Prva HNL ===
==== First stage ====
| Pos | Team | Pld | W | D | L | GF | GA | GD | Pts | Qualification |
|---|---|---|---|---|---|---|---|---|---|---|
| 1 | Croatia Zagreb | 22 | 17 | 2 | 3 | 44 | 14 | +30 | 53 | Qualification to championship group |
| 2 | Rijeka | 22 | 17 | 1 | 4 | 35 | 18 | +17 | 52 | Qualification to championship group |
| 3 | Hajduk Split | 22 | 12 | 6 | 4 | 38 | 17 | +21 | 42 | Qualification to championship group |
| 4 | Osijek | 22 | 11 | 3 | 8 | 37 | 23 | +14 | 36 | Qualification to championship group |
| 5 | Varteks | 22 | 9 | 3 | 10 | 40 | 36 | +4 | 30 | Qualification to championship group |

Source: RSSSF.org
Rules for classification: 1st points; 2nd head-to-head points; 3rd head-to-head goal difference; 4th head-to-head away goals scored

==== Second stage (championship play-off) ====
| Pos | Team | Pld | W | D | L | GF | GA | GD | Pts | Qualification |
|---|---|---|---|---|---|---|---|---|---|---|
| 1 | Croatia Zagreb (C) | 10 | 5 | 3 | 2 | 11 | 6 | +5 | 45 | Qualification to Champions League third qualifying round |
| 2 | Rijeka | 10 | 5 | 3 | 2 | 18 | 15 | +3 | 44 | Qualification to Champions League second qualifying round |
| 3 | Hajduk Split | 10 | 5 | 3 | 2 | 24 | 15 | +9 | 39 | Qualification to UEFA Cup qualifying round |
| 4 | Osijek | 10 | 3 | 3 | 4 | 14 | 16 | −2 | 30 | Qualification to UEFA Cup first round |
| 5 | Hrvatski Dragovoljac | 10 | 3 | 1 | 6 | 15 | 21 | −6 | 23 | Qualification to Intertoto Cup first round |
| 6 | Varteks | 10 | 2 | 1 | 7 | 10 | 19 | −9 | 22 | Qualification to Intertoto Cup first round |

Source: RSSSF.org
Rules for classification: 1st points; 2nd head-to-head points; 3rd head-to-head goal difference; 4th head-to-head away goals scored
(C) Champions

==== Results summary ====
| Overall | | | | | | | | Home | | | | | | Away | | | | | |
| Pld | W | D | L | GF | GA | GD | Pts | W | D | L | GF | GA | GD | W | D | L | GF | GA | GD |
|---|---|---|---|---|---|---|---|---|---|---|---|---|---|---|---|---|---|---|---|
| 32 | 17 | 9 | 6 | 62 | 32 | +30 | 60 | 14 | 1 | 1 | 42 | 10 | +32 | 3 | 8 | 5 | 20 | 22 | −2 |

Last updated: 26 May 1999.
Source: Sportnet.hr

==== Results by round ====
| Round | 1 | 2 | 3 | 4 | 5 | 6 | 7 | 8 | 9 | 10 | 11 | 12 | 13 | 14 | 15 | 16 | 17 | 18 | 19 | 20 | 21 | 22 | 23 | 24 | 25 | 26 | 27 | 28 | 29 | 30 | 31 | 32 |
|---|---|---|---|---|---|---|---|---|---|---|---|---|---|---|---|---|---|---|---|---|---|---|---|---|---|---|---|---|---|---|---|---|
| Ground | A | H | A | H | A | H | A | A | H | A | H | H | A | H | A | H | A | H | H | A | H | A | H | A | H | A | H | A | H | A | H | A |
| Result | D | W | D | W | W | W | L | W | W | D | D | W | D | W | D | W | L | W | W | L | W | L | W | W | W | D | W | D | W | D | L | L |
| Position | 7 | 2 | 4 | 2 | 2 | 2 | 2 | 2 | 2 | 2 | 2 | 2 | 3 | 3 | 3 | 3 | 3 | 3 | 3 | 3 | 3 | 3 | 3 | 3 | 2 | 2 | 2 | 2 | 1 | 2 | 3 | 3 |

Source: Competitive matches
A = Away; H = Home; W = Win; D = Draw; L = Loss

==== Results by opponent ====
| Team | 1–22 | | 23–32 | | Points |
| Team | 1 | 2 | 1 | 2 | Points |
|---|---|---|---|---|---|
| Cibalia | 2–2 | 2–0 | — | — | 4 |
| Croatia Zagreb | 1–1 | 0–1 | 1–0 | 1–1 | 5 |
| Hrvatski Dragovoljac | 0–0 | 2–0 | 6–1 | 1–3 | 7 |
| Mladost 127 | 3–0 | 1–1 | — | — | 4 |
| Osijek | 1–0 | 2–1 | 4–1 | 1–1 | 10 |
| Rijeka | 3–1 | 1–2 | 3–3 | 1–3 | 4 |
| Slaven Belupo | 5–0 | 1–1 | — | — | 4 |
| Šibenik | 2–1 | 0–1 | — | — | 4 |
| Varteks | 4–1 | 3–0 | 2–1 | 4–1 | 12 |
| Zadarkomerc | 1–1 | 2–0 | — | — | 3 |
| NK Zagreb | 1–3 | 1–0 | — | — | 3 |

Source: 1998–99 Croatian First Football League article

== Matches ==
=== Prva HNL ===
| Round | Date | Venue | Opponent | Score | Attendance | Hajduk Scorers | Report |
|---|---|---|---|---|---|---|---|
| 1 | 7 Aug | AR | Hrvatski Dragovoljac | 0 – 0 | 3,500 | | HRnogomet.com |
| 2 | 16 Aug | H | Mladost 127 | 3 – 0 | 2,000 | Deranja (3) | HRnogomet.com |
| 3 | 21 Aug | A | Cibalia | 2 – 2 | 4,000 | Računica, Vučko | HRnogomet.com |
| 4 | 30 Aug | H | Slaven Belupo | 5 – 0 | 4,000 | Računica (3), Baturina, Vučko | HRnogomet.com |
| 5 | 11 Sep | A | Varteks | 4 – 1 | 5,000 | Računica, Leko, Baturina, Deranja | HRnogomet.com |
| 6 | 20 Sep | H | Rijeka | 3 – 1 | 6,000 | Računica, Deranja (2) | HRnogomet.com |
| 7 | 25 Sep | A | NK Zagreb | 1 – 3 | 4,000 | Leko | HRnogomet.com |
| 8 | 4 Oct | A | Osijek | 1 – 0 | 6,000 | Baturina | HRnogomet.com |
| 9 | 18 Oct | H | Šibenik | 2 – 1 | 4,000 | Baturina (2) | HRnogomet.com |
| 10 | 25 Oct | A | Zadarkomerc | 1 – 1 | 8,000 | Skoko | Slobodna Dalmacija |
| 11 | 30 Oct | H | Croatia Zagreb | 1 – 1 | 30,000 | Leko | HRnogomet.com |
| 12 | 7 Nov | H | Hrvatski Dragovoljac | 2 – 0 | 4,000 | Vučko, Deranja | HRnogomet.com |
| 13 | 15 Nov | A | Mladost 127 | 1 – 1 | 3,500 | Računica | HRnogomet.com |
| 14 | 22 Nov | H | Cibalia | 2 – 0 | 1,000 | Deranja (2) | HRnogomet.com |
| 15 | 29 Nov | A | Slaven Belupo | 1 – 1 | 3,000 | Deranja | HRnogomet.com |
| 16 | 6 Dec | H | Varteks | 3 – 0 | 2,000 | Bulat, Deranja, Vučko | HRnogomet.com |
| 17 | 13 Dec | A | Rijeka | 1 – 2 | 15,000 | Deranja | HRnogomet.com |
| 18 | 21 Feb | H | NK Zagreb | 1 – 0 | 10,000 | Skoko | Slobodna Dalmacija |
| 19 | 28 Feb | H | Osijek | 2 – 1 | 18,000 | Vučko, Biliškov | HRnogomet.com |
| 20 | 7 Mar | A | Šibenik | 0 – 1 | 10,000 | | Slobodna Dalmacija |
| 21 | 14 Mar | H | Zadarkomerc | 2 – 0 | 9,000 | Deranja, Pralija | HRnogomet.com |
| 22 | 21 Mar | A | Croatia Zagreb | 0 – 1 | 25,000 | | HRnogomet.com |
| 23 | 17 Apr | H | Osijek | 4 – 1 | 7,000 | Erceg (2), Vučko, Pralija | HRnogomet.com |
| 24 | 21 Apr | A | Varteks | 2 – 1 | 4,000 | Erceg (2) | HRnogomet.com |
| 25 | 25 Apr | H | Croatia Zagreb | 1 – 0 | 30,000 | Erceg | HRnogomet.com |
| 26 | 2 May | A | Rijeka | 3 – 3 | 20,000 | Baturina, Vučko, Biliškov | HRnogomet.com |
| 27 | 9 May | H | Hrvatski Dragovoljac | 6 – 1 | 8,000 | Mujdža, Pralija, Leko, Erceg, Skoko, Mrzlečki | HRnogomet.com |
| 28 | 12 May | A | Osijek | 1 – 1 | 8,000 | Vučko | Slobodna Dalmacija |
| 29 | 16 May | H | Varteks | 4 – 1 | 15,000 | Vuković, Miladin, Deranja, Računica | HRnogomet.com |
| 30 | 19 May | A | Croatia Zagreb | 1 – 1 | 18,000 | Vuković | HRnogomet.com |
| 31 | 23 May | H | Rijeka | 1 – 3 | 40,000 | Miladin | HRnogomet.com |
| 32 | 26 May | AR | Hrvatski Dragovoljac | 1 – 3 | 3,000 | Erceg | HRnogomet.com |

Source: hajduk.hr

=== Croatian Football Cup ===
| Round | Date | Venue | Opponent | Score | Attendance | Hajduk Scorers | Report |
|---|---|---|---|---|---|---|---|
| R1 | 6 Sep | A | Bojovnik 7 Novi Golubovec | 3 – 2 | 2,000 | Miladin, Deranja, Vučko | HRnogomet.com |
| R2 | 21 Oct | H | Mladost 127 | 5 – 1 | 2,000 | Baturina, Skoko, Računica, Mujdža | HRnogomet.com |
| QF | 11 Nov | A | Čakovec | 0 – 0 | 4,000 | | HRnogomet.com |
| QF | 18 Nov | H | Čakovec | 2 – 0 | 1,000 | Računica, Leko | HRnogomet.com |
| SF | 3 Mar | A | Cibalia | 1 – 2 | 5,000 | Baturina | HRnogomet.com |
| SF | 17 Mar | H | Cibalia | 2 – 1 (5 – 6 p) | 2,500 | Ratković, Deranja | HRnogomet.com |

Source: hajduk.hr

=== UEFA Cup ===
| Round | Date | Venue | Opponent | Score | Attendance | Hajduk Scorers | Report |
|---|---|---|---|---|---|---|---|
| QR2 | 11 Aug | H | Malmö (Sweden) | 1 – 1 | 17,000 | Brajković | UEFA.com |
| QR2 | 25 Aug | A (Sweden) | Malmö (Sweden) | 2 – 1 | 4,453 | Vučko (2) | UEFA.com |
| R1 | 15 Sep | AR (Italy) | Fiorentina (Italy) | 1 – 2 | 6,000 | Vučko | UEFA.com |
| R1 | 29 Sep | H | Fiorentina (Italy) | 0 – 0 | 35,000 | | UEFA.com |

Source: hajduk.hr

== Player seasonal records ==
=== Top scorers ===
| Rank | Name | League | Europe | Cup | Total |
|---|---|---|---|---|---|
| 1 | (Croatia) Zvonimir Deranja | 14 | – | 3 | 17 |
| 2 | (Croatia) Jurica Vučko | 8 | 3 | 1 | 12 |
| 3 | (Croatia) Dean Računica | 8 | – | 2 | 10 |
| 4 | (Croatia) Mate Baturina | 6 | – | 2 | 8 |
| 5 | (Croatia) Tomislav Erceg | 7 | – | – | 7 |
| 6 | (Croatia) Ivan Leko | 4 | – | 1 | 5 |
| 7 | (Australia) Josip Skoko | 3 | – | 1 | 4 |
| 8 | (Croatia) Nenad Pralija | 3 | – | – | 3 |
| 8 | (Croatia) Darko Miladin | 2 | – | 1 | 3 |
| 10 | (Croatia) Marino Biliškov | 2 | – | – | 2 |
| 10 | (Bosnia and Herzegovina) Jasmin Mujdža | 1 | – | 1 | 2 |
| 10 | (Croatia) Hrvoje Vuković | 2 | – | – | 2 |
| 13 | (Croatia) Elvis Brajković | – | 1 | – | 1 |
| 13 | (Croatia) Josip Bulat | 1 | – | – | 1 |
| 13 | (Croatia) Alen Mrzlečki | 1 | – | – | 1 |
| 13 | (Croatia) Zoran Ratković | – | – | 1 | 1 |
| | TOTALS | 62 | 3 | 12 | 77 |

Source: Competitive matches

== See also ==
- 1998–99 Croatian First Football League
- 1998–99 Croatian Football Cup

== External sources ==
- 1998–99 Prva HNL at HRnogomet.com
- 1998–99 Croatian Cup at HRnogomet.com
- 1998–99 UEFA Cup at rsssf.com
