= Dalmatian derby (Hajduk Split–Šibenik) =

Hajduk Split vs Šibenik (Dalmatian Derby)
- Other names: Dalmatinski derbi
- Location: Split and Šibenik, Croatia
- Teams: Hajduk Split and Šibenik
- First meeting: 19 December 1937
- Latest meeting: Šibenik 1–2 Hajduk Split; 2024–25 HNL (22 December 2024)

Statistics
- Total meetings: 65 (53 league)
- Most wins: Hajduk Split (50)
- Most player appearances: Josip Bulat (19)
- Top scorer: Marko Livaja (8)

The Dalmatian derby (Croatian: Dalmatinski derbi) was the name given to matches between Hajduk Split and Šibenik. It is a regional derby between football clubs from central Dalmatia’s two largest cities, Split and Šibenik. The teams are supported by their fanbases called Split's Torcida and Šibenik's Funcuti.

In these derbies, hostility is expressed between people from Split and Šibenik, because most inhabitants from the urban part of the city are fans of Šibenik, and people from the surrounding area the supporters of Hajduk. Not infrequently this hostility brings incidents, but they pass without a large number of injured people.

These derbies were played regularly since the formation of Croatian First Football League, until 2003 when Šibenik was relegated to the Croatian Second Football League and played again in 2006 when it returned to the Croatian First Football League and again regularly until 2012 when Šibenik was relegated again. These two teams have met in the final of the 2009–10 Croatian Cup when Hajduk won both matches and won the trophy which was the peak of the rivalry so far.

The derby was also played off the field, because of Hajduk's debts towards Šibenik from money of the transfer of Ante Rukavina. Hajduk was suspended many times and threatened with not playing official matches, but the suspension was delayed many times. It all ended well for Hajduk, which is no longer under threat of suspension since it paid its debts to Šibenik.

== Results ==
Competition	Played	Hajduk wins	Draws	Šibenik wins	Hajduk goals	Šibenik goals
Yugoslav championship (1946–1991)
Yugoslav Cup	6	4	1	1	15	9
Croatian championship (1992–2025)
HNL	52	40	8	5	97	35
Croatian Cup	6	6	0	0	12	3
Croatia totals	58	46	8	6	109	38
All Time	64	50	9	6	124	47

Last updated on 07 December 2025

Note: Home team's score always shown first

=== Key ===
Match ended in a draw
Hajduk win
Šibenik win

=== 1950–1992 ===
M	Date	Competition	Ground	Score	Hajduk scorers	Šibenik scorers	Attendance
1	26 Nov 1950	Cup (1st Round)	Šubićevac	0–2	Radovniković, Schönauer		3,500
2	1 Aug 1956	Cup (round of 32)	Šubićevac	2–0		Škugor, ?	2,000
3	26 Feb 1961	Cup (Quarter finals)	Stari plac	4–3	Anković (3), Z.Bego	Orošnjak (2), Nadoveza	9,000
4	14 Oct 1964	Cup (2nd Round)	Stari plac	2–2 (3–2 p)	Žaja, Z.Bego	Žepina (2)	3,000
5	10 Nov 1965	Cup (2nd Round)	Stari plac	4–0	Hlevnjak, Kovačić, Nadoveza		3,000
6	23 Nov 1966	Cup (round of 32)	Stari plac	3–2	Kovačić, Ivković, Nadoveza	Ninić (2)	1,000

=== 1992–2025 ===
M	Date	Competition	Ground	Score	Hajduk scorers	Šibenik scorers	Attendance	Report
7	15 Apr 1992	1. HNL	Park Mladeži	2–3	Jeličić (2), Novaković	Vuković (2)	4,000	HRnogomet.com
8	13 Jun 1992	1. HNL	Poljud	4–1	Mornar, Abazi, Kozniku (2)	Računica	10,000	HRnogomet.com
9	30 Aug 1992	1. HNL	Šubićevac	0–1	Kozniku		4,500	HRnogomet.com
10	14 Mar 1993	1. HNL	Poljud	1–1	Kozniku	Katić	2,500	HRnogomet.com
11	16 Oct 1993	1. HNL	Poljud	2–0	Računica, Mornar		2,000	HRnogomet.com
12	24 Apr 1994	1. HNL	Šubićevac	0–0			10,000	HRnogomet.com
13	28 Aug 1994	1. HNL	Šubićevac	2–2	Asanović, Rapaić	Petković, Muriqi	12,000	HRnogomet.com
14	10 Mar 1995	1. HNL	Poljud	3–1	Erceg, Andrijašević (2)	Shehu	2,500	HRnogomet.com
15	22 Oct 1995	1. HNL	Poljud	0–0			3,000	HRnogomet.com
16	3 Mar 1996	1. HNL	Šubićevac	0–0			9,000	HRnogomet.com
17	25 Aug 1996	1. HNL	Šubićevac	0–2	Sarr (2)		6,000	HRnogomet.com
18	9 Mar 1997	1. HNL	Poljud	1–0	Vučko		10,000	HRnogomet.com
19	17 Aug 1997	1. HNL	Poljud	3–0	Leko, Erceg (2)		5,000	HRnogomet.com
20	19 Nov 1997	1. HNL	Šubićevac	1–4	Erceg (2), Tudor, Brajković	Rendulić	5,000	HRnogomet.com
21	18 Oct 1998	1. HNL	Poljud	2–1	Baturina (2)	Rendulić	4,000	HRnogomet.com
22	7 Mar 1999	1. HNL	Šubićevac	1–0		Kovačić	8,000	HRnogomet.com
23	1 Aug 1999	1. HNL	Poljud	3–1	Baturina, Musa, Lalić	Marasović	8,000	HRnogomet.com
24	27 Oct 1999	Cup (round of 16)	Poljud	3–1	Baturina, Bilić, Skoko	Harmat	2,000	HRnogomet.com
25	6 Nov 1999	1. HNL	Šubićevac	1–3	Deranja, Baturina, Leko	Putnik	3,500	HRnogomet.com
26	11 Apr 2000	1. HNL	Poljud	0–3 (1–2)^{1}	Antolić (o.g.)	Vuković (2)	4,000	HRnogomet.com
27	14 Oct 2000	1. HNL	Poljud	0–0			1,500	HRnogomet.com
28	18 Mar 2001	1. HNL	Šubićevac	3–0	Deranja, Musa, Bilić		6,000	HRnogomet.com
29	30 Sep 2001	1. HNL	Šubićevac	1–2	Deranja, Erceg	Kosić	3,000	HRnogomet.com
30	23 Mar 2002	1. HNL	Poljud	1–0	Carević		1,000	HRnogomet.com
31	10 Aug 2002	1. HNL	Šubićevac	0–1	Vejić		10,000	HRnogomet.com
32	9 Nov 2002	1. HNL	Poljud	3–1	Đolonga, Pletikosa, Krpan	Jović	4,000	HRnogomet.com
33	14 Oct 2006	1. HNL	Šubićevac	1–2	Balatinac, Musa	Rukavina	8,000	HRnogomet.com
34	1 Mar 2007	1. HNL	Poljud	3–0	Musa, Bartolović, Bušić		6,000	HRnogomet.com
35	2 May 2007	1. HNL	Šubićevac	2–2	Jelavić, Ljubičić	Bulat, Batur	5,000	HRnogomet.com
36	29 Sep 2007	1. HNL	Šubićevac	1–0		Vitaić	5,000	HRnogomet.com
37	1 Mar 2008	1. HNL	Poljud	2–0	B. Živković, Verpakovskis		2,500	HRnogomet.com
38	15 Mar 2008	1. HNL	Poljud	4–1	Kalinić (2), Verpakovskis, Andrić	Gabriel	3,000	HRnogomet.com
39	14 Sep 2008	1. HNL	Poljud	1–0	Gabrić		2,000	HRnogomet.com
40	7 Dec 2008	1. HNL	Šubićevac	1–2	Kalinić, Gabrić	Milanović	6,000	HRnogomet.com
41	17 May 2009	1. HNL	Poljud	2–0	Pandža, Kalinić		4,000	HRnogomet.com
42	18 Oct 2009	1. HNL	Poljud	0–1		Zec	5,000	HRnogomet.com
43	17 Apr 2010	1. HNL	Šubićevac	0–1	Ibričić		4,000	HRnogomet.com
44	21 Apr 2010	Cup (final)	Poljud	2–1	Tičinović, Ibričić	Zec	15,000	HRnogomet.com
45	5 May 2010	Cup (final)	Šubićevac	0–2	Vukušić, Ibričić		5,500	HRnogomet.com
46	8 Aug 2010	1. HNL	Poljud	2–0	Ibričić, Vukušić		8,000	HRnogomet.com
47	5 Dec 2010	1. HNL	Šubićevac	1–3	Tomasov, Andrić, Ibričić	Alispahić	3,000	HRnogomet.com
48	19 Jul 2011	1. HNL	Poljud	2–1	Vukušić, Tomasov	Vuk	18,000	HRnogomet.com
49	26 Nov 2011	1. HNL	Šubićevac	1–2	Lendrić (2)	A. Živković	3,000	HRnogomet.com
50	25 Oct 2017	Cup (round of 16)	Šubićevac	0–1	Fomitschow		3,000	hns.family
51	31 Oct 2018	Cup (round of 16)	Šubićevac	1–2 (aet)	Said, Jurić	Ivanovski (o.g.)	2,798	hns.family
52	18 Oct 2020	1. HNL	Poljud	0–1		Sahiti	4,517	hnl.hr
53	22 Jan 2021	1. HNL	Šubićevac	0–1	Teklić		0	hnl.hr
54	20 Mar 2021	1. HNL	Poljud	1–0	Ljubičić		0	hnl.hr
55	16 May 2021	1. HNL	Šubićevac	0–2	Livaja, Jakoliš		0	hnl.hr
56	1 Aug 2021	1. HNL	Poljud	1–0	Edouk		5,163	hnl.hr
57	17 Oct 2021	1. HNL	Šubićevac	2–0		Mina, Ćurić	1,668	hnl.hr
58	29 Jan 2022	1. HNL	Šubićevac	1–3	Livaja (2), Krovinović	Ćurić	1,156	hnl.hr
59	9 Apr 2022	1. HNL	Poljud	2–1	Krovinović, Elez	Ćurić	8,645	hnl.hr
60	9 Sep 2022	HNL	Šubićevac	1–1	Mlakar	Dolček	2,578	hnl.hr
61	22 Jan 2023	HNL	Poljud	2–1	Kalik, Livaja	Arai	9,358	hnl.hr
62	1 Apr 2023	HNL	Šubićevac	2–3	Livaja, Mlakar, Pukštas	Dolček, Kvržić	2,718	hnl.hr
63	24 May 2023	Cup (final)	Rujevica	2–0	Melnjak, Livaja		7,041	hns.family
64	28 May 2023	HNL	Poljud	3–0	Brajković, Mlakar, Benrahou		18,753	hnl.hr
65	6 Oct 2024	HNL	Poljud	4–0	Rakitić, Durdov, Kalik, Livaja		21,538	hnl.hr
66	22 Dec 2024	HNL	Šubićevac	1–2	Livaja, Krovinović	Kulušić	3,083	hnl.hr
66	30 Mar 2025	HNL	Poljud					
67	25 May 2025	HNL	Šubićevac					

^{1} Match abandoned after 81 minutes due to supporters pitch invasion in an attempt to attack players. Therefore, the match was awarded to Šibenik and Hajduk was punished with their home matches being played behind closed doors until the end of the 1999–2000 season.

== Player and manager records ==
=== Top scorers ===
Updated up to the last derby played on 6 October 2024

8 goals

- (Croatia) Marko Livaja (Hajduk Split)

6 goals

- (Croatia) Tomislav Erceg (Hajduk Split)

5 goals

- (Croatia) Mate Baturina (Hajduk Split)
- (Bosnia and Herzegovina) Senijad Ibričić (Hajduk Split)

4 goals

- (Croatia) Nikola Kalinić (Hajduk Split)
- (Croatia) Ardian Kozniku (Hajduk Split)
- (Croatia) Igor Musa (Hajduk Split)
- (Croatia) Klaudio Vuković (Šibenik)

=== Players who have scored in Dalmatian derby for both clubs ===
- (Croatia) Dean Računica

=== Players who have played for both clubs (senior career) ===
- (Albania) Eduard Abazi
- (Croatia) Ante Aračić
- (Croatia) Stipe Bačelić-Grgić
- (Croatia) Stipe Balajić
- (Croatia) Mate Baturina
- (Croatia) Joško Bilić
- (Croatia) Slaven Bilić
- (Croatia) Goran Blažević
- (Croatia) Dario Brgles
- (Croatia) Mario Budimir
- (Croatia) Josip Bulat
- (Croatia) Niko Čeko
- (Croatia) Vedran Celiščak
- (Croatia) Duje Čop
- (Croatia) Nikica Cukrov
- (Croatia) Ivo Cuzzi
- (Croatia) Ivan Delić
- (Croatia) Ivan Dolček
- (Croatia) Mate Dragičević
- (Croatia) Darko Dražić
- (Croatia) Tomislav Erceg
- (Croatia) Dalibor Filipović
- (Australia) Anthony Grdić
- (Croatia) Ante Hrgović
- (Croatia) Ante Ivica
- (Croatia) Antonio Jakoliš
- (Croatia) Marin Jakoliš
- (Croatia) Ivan Jurić
- (Croatia) Nikola Kalinić
- (Croatia) Leon Kreković
- (Croatia) Ivan Krolo
- (Croatia) Igor Lozo
- (Croatia) Krešimir Makarin
- (Croatia) Mate Maleš
- (Croatia) Zvonimir Milić
- (Croatia) Alen Mrzlečki
- (Croatia) Petar Nadoveza
- (Croatia) Mario Novaković
- (Bosnia and Herzegovina) Boris Pandža
- (Croatia) Matko Perdijić
- (Croatia) Mladen Pralija
- (Croatia) Jurica Puljiz
- (Croatia) Denis Putnik
- (Bosnia and Herzegovina) Ivan Radeljić
- (Croatia) Dean Računica
- (Croatia) Božidar Radošević
- (Croatia) Krunoslav Rendulić
- (Croatia) Ante Režić
- (Croatia) Ivan Rodić
- (Croatia) Zoran Roglić
- (Croatia) Ante Rukavina
- (Croatia) Zlatko Runje
- (Kosovo) Emir Sahiti
- (Croatia) Mate Selak
- (Croatia) Zoran Slavica
- (Croatia) Vjeran Simunić
- (Bosnia and Herzegovina) Dragan Stojkić
- (Croatia) Duje Špalj
- (Croatia) Petar Šuto
- (Croatia) Frane Vitaić
- (Croatia) Tonči Žilić

=== Managers who have worked at both clubs ===
- (Croatia) Luka Bonačić
- (Croatia) Ivan Buljan
- (Croatia) Nikica Cukrov
- (Croatia) Ivica Kalinić
- (Croatia) Ivan Katalinić
- (Croatia) Petar Nadoveza
- (Croatia) Ivan Pudar

== Head-to-head league results ==
The table lists the place each team took in each of the seasons.

	1992	92–93	93–94	94–95	95–96	96–97	97–98	98–99	99–00	00–01	01–02	02–03	06–07	07–08	08–09	09–10	10–11	11–12	20–21	21–22	22–23
No. of teams	12	16	18	16	12	16	12	12	12	12	16	12	12	12	12	16	16	16	10	10	10
Hajduk Split	1	2	1	1	2	2	2	3	2	1	2	2	2	5	2	2	2	2	4	2	2
Šibenik	12	16	13	9	7	7	9	8	9	7	11	12	4	10	6	4	12	14	6	8	10
