= 2000 Croatian Football Cup final =

- Event: 1999–2000 Croatian Cup
Hajduk Split	Dinamo Zagreb
2	1

First leg
Hajduk Split	Dinamo Zagreb
2	0
- Date: 2 May 2000
- Venue: Stadion Poljud, Split
- Man of the Match: Jurica Vučko (Hajduk Split)
- Referee: Draženko Kovačić (Križevci)
- Attendance: 20,000
- Weather: Cloudy and Rainy

Second leg
Dinamo Zagreb	Hajduk Split
1	0
- Date: 16 May 2000
- Venue: Stadion Maksimir, Zagreb
- Man of the Match: Slaven Bilić (Hajduk Split)
- Referee: Željko Širić (Osijek)
- Attendance: 17,000
- Weather: Clear

The 2000 Croatian Cup final was a two-legged affair played between Hajduk Split and Dinamo Zagreb. The first leg was played in Split on 2 May 2000, while the second leg on 16 May 2000 in Zagreb.

Hajduk Split won the trophy with an aggregate result of 2–1.

The final was overshadowed by the clashes between both clubs supporters and police in the first leg at Stadion Poljud in Split. The first leg was abandoned in 86th minute and was registered with the result that was reached 2–0, and Hajduk Split was punished by having their three matches behind closed doors.

== Road to the final ==
Hajduk Split		Round	Dinamo Zagreb^{1}	
Opponent	Result		Opponent	Result
Moslavac Popovača	8–0	First round	BSK Buk	10–0
Šibenik	3–1	Second round	Marsonia	4–0
Slaven Belupo	0–0	Quarter-finals	Rijeka	2–1
Slaven Belupo	2–1	Quarter-finals	Rijeka	2–2
NK Zagreb	2–1	Semi-finals	Cibalia	3–0
NK Zagreb	2–2	Semi-finals	Cibalia	3–1

^{1}Dinamo Zagreb was called Croatia Zagreb in the autumn part of the season.

== First leg ==
2 May 2000
18:00

Hajduk Split	2–0	Dinamo Zagreb
Vučko 38' (pen.), 53'	Report (in Croatian)

Stadion Poljud, Split
Attendance: 20,000
Referee: Draženko Kovačić (Križevci)

HAJDUK SPLIT:
GK	1	(Croatia) Stipe Pletikosa
DF	2	(North Macedonia) Igor Gjuzelov	(yellow card) 41'
DF	6	(Australia) Anthony Grdic	(yellow card) 63'
DF	21	(Croatia) Darko Miladin
DF	28	(Croatia) Slaven Bilić (c)
MF	8	(Croatia) Igor Musa
MF	10	(Croatia) Ivan Leko	(yellow card) 86'
MF	13	(Canada) Ante Jazić	(yellow card) 81'
MF	22	(Croatia) Ante Miše	(yellow card) 27'	(substituted off) 70'
FW	9	(Croatia) Mate Baturina
FW	23	(Croatia) Jurica Vučko	(yellow card) 38'	(substituted off) 75'
Substitutes:
MF	14	(Croatia) Srđan Andrić		(substituted on) 70'
FW	30	(Croatia) Mate Bilić		(substituted on) 75'
Manager:
(Croatia) Petar Nadoveza

DINAMO ZAGREB:
GK	1	(Croatia) Dražen Ladić
DF	2	(Croatia) Mario Tokić	(yellow card) 20'
DF	3	(Croatia) Damir Krznar
DF	5	(Croatia) Goran Jurić	(yellow card) 54'
DF	20	(Croatia) Stjepan Tomas
MF	6	(Slovenia) Zoran Pavlović		(substituted off) 65'
MF	10	(Bosnia and Herzegovina) Edin Mujčin
MF	15	(Croatia) Daniel Šarić
MF	22	(Croatia) Igor Bišćan (c)	(yellow card) 37'
FW	25	(Croatia) Tomo Šokota		(substituted off) 78'
FW	16	(Croatia) Josip Šimić		(substituted off) 54'
Substitutes:
FW	21	(Croatia) Igor Cvitanović		(substituted on) 54'
MF	7	(Bosnia and Herzegovina) Nermin Šabić		(substituted on) 65'
MF	14	(Croatia) Mihael Mikić		(substituted on) 78'
Manager:
(Croatia) Marijan Vlak

Assistant referees:
Matija Strugačevac (Belišće)
Darko Slivar (Valpovo)

Match rules

- 90 minutes.
- Seven named substitutes.
- Maximum of three substitutions.

== Second leg ==
16 May 2000
18:30

Dinamo Zagreb	1–0	Hajduk Split
I. Cvitanović 90+2'	Report (in Croatian)

Stadion Maksimir, Zagreb
Attendance: 17,000
Referee: Željko Širić (Osijek)

DINAMO ZAGREB:
GK	1	(Croatia) Dražen Ladić
DF	2	(Croatia) Mario Tokić
DF	4	(North Macedonia) Goce Sedloski
DF	17	(Croatia) Mario Cvitanović		(substituted off) 66'
DF	20	(Croatia) Stjepan Tomas
MF	7	(Bosnia and Herzegovina) Nermin Šabić
MF	10	(Bosnia and Herzegovina) Edin Mujčin		(substituted off) 56'
MF	15	(Croatia) Daniel Šarić	(yellow card) 38'	(substituted off) 74'
MF	22	(Croatia) Igor Bišćan (c)
FW	18	(Croatia) Igor Cvitanović	(yellow card) 90'
FW	25	(Croatia) Tomo Šokota
Substitutes:
MF	6	(Slovenia) Zoran Pavlović		(substituted on) 56'
DF	3	(Croatia) Damir Krznar		(substituted on) 66'
MF	11	(Croatia) Mario Bazina		(substituted on) 74'
Manager:
(Croatia) Marijan Vlak

HAJDUK SPLIT:
GK	1	(Croatia) Stipe Pletikosa
DF	2	(North Macedonia) Igor Gjuzelov
DF	6	(Australia) Anthony Grdic
DF	21	(Croatia) Darko Miladin
DF	28	(Croatia) Slaven Bilić (c)	(yellow card) 28'
MF	8	(Croatia) Igor Musa		(substituted off) 62'
MF	10	(Croatia) Ivan Leko	(yellow card) 77'
MF	13	(Canada) Ante Jazić	(yellow card) 48'
MF	22	(Croatia) Ante Miše	(yellow card) 14'
FW	9	(Croatia) Mate Baturina		(substituted off) 67'
FW	23	(Croatia) Jurica Vučko	(yellow card) 25' (yellow-red card) 75'
Substitutes:
DF	18	(Croatia) Josip Bulat	(yellow card) 88'	(substituted on) 62'
FW	11	(Croatia) Zvonimir Deranja		(substituted on) 67'	(substituted off) 71'
FW	30	(Croatia) Mate Bilić		(substituted on) 71'
Manager:
(Croatia) Petar Nadoveza

Assistant referees:
Milan Berger (Osijek)
Darko Kolić (Sibinj)

Match rules

- 90 minutes.
- Penalty shoot-out if scores still level; no extra time.
- Seven named substitutes.
- Maximum of three substitutions.
