= 1997–98 HNK Hajduk Split season =

Hajduk Split
1997–98 season
- Chairman: Željko Kovačević
- Manager: Tomislav Ivić; Luka Bonačić; Zoran Vulić
- Prva HNL: 2nd
- Croatian Cup: Semi-finals
- UEFA Cup: First round
- Top goalscorer: League: Tomislav Erceg (11); All: Tomislav Erceg (15)
- Highest home attendance: 30,000 vs Croatia Zagreb (22 August 1997)
- Lowest home attendance: 500 vs Mladost 127 (3 December 1997)
- Average home league attendance: 7,313

The 1997–98 season was the 87th season in Hajduk Split’s history and their seventh in the Prva HNL. Their 2nd place finish in the 1996–97 season meant it was their 7th successive season playing in the Prva HNL.

== Competitions ==
=== Overall record ===
Performance by competition
Competition	Starting round	Final position/round	First match	Last match
Prva HNL	—N/a	Runners-up	3 August 1997	10 May 1998
Croatian Football Cup	First round	Semi-final	3 September 1997	15 April 1998
UEFA Cup	First qualifying round	First round	23 July 1997	30 September 1997

Statistics by competition
Competition	Pld	W	D	L	GF	GA	GD	Win%
Prva HNL	32	17	6	9	53	46	+7	53.13
Croatian Football Cup	6	4	0	2	10	6	+4	66.67
UEFA Cup	6	4	0	2	13	8	+5	66.67
Total	44	25	6	13	76	60	+16	56.82

=== Prva HNL ===
==== First stage ====
Pos	Team	Pld	W	D	L	GF	GA	GD	Pts	Qualification
1	Croatia Zagreb	22	15	4	3	46	18	+28	49	Qualification to championship group
2	Hajduk Split	22	13	4	5	36	20	+16	43	Qualification to championship group
3	NK Zagreb	22	12	5	5	35	23	+12	41	Qualification to championship group
4	Hrvatski Dragovoljac	22	10	6	6	31	18	+13	36	Qualification to championship group
5	Osijek	22	9	5	8	29	26	+3	32	Qualification to championship group

Source: RSSSF.org
Rules for classification: 1st points; 2nd head-to-head points; 3rd head-to-head goal difference; 4th head-to-head away goals scored

==== Second stage (championship play-off) ====
Pos	Team	Pld	W	D	L	GF	GA	GD	Pts	Qualification
1	Croatia Zagreb (C)	10	7	3	0	28	10	+18	49	Qualification to Champions League second qualifying round
2	Hajduk Split	10	4	2	4	17	16	+1	36	Qualification to UEFA Cup second qualifying round
3	Osijek	10	5	1	4	13	12	+1	32	Qualification to UEFA Cup second qualifying round
4	Hrvatski Dragovoljac	10	4	2	4	7	12	−5	32	Qualification to Intertoto Cup first round
5	NK Zagreb	10	2	3	5	16	16	0	30	
6	Zadarkomerc	10	2	1	7	11	26	−15	21	

Source: RSSSF.org
Rules for classification: 1st points; 2nd head-to-head points; 3rd head-to-head goal difference; 4th head-to-head away goals scored
(C) Champions

==== Results summary ====
Overall								Home						Away					
Pld	W	D	L	GF	GA	GD	Pts	W	D	L	GF	GA	GD	W	D	L	GF	GA	GD
32	17	6	9	53	36	+17	57	13	2	1	33	13	+20	4	4	8	20	23	−3

Last updated: 10 May 1998.
Source: Sportnet.hr

==== Results by round ====
Round	1	2	3	4	5	6	7	8	9	10	11	12	13	14	15	16	17	18	19	20	21	22	23	24	25	26	27	28	29	30	31	32
Ground	H	A	H	H	A	H	A	H	A	H	A	A	H	A	A	H	A	H	A	H	A	H	H	A	H	H	A	A	H	A	A	H
Result	W	L	W	W	W	W	W	W	W	W	D	L	D	W	L	W	D	L	L	W	D	W	W	L	W	W	L	L	L	D	D	W
Position	3	5	5	2	2	2	1	1	1	1	1	2	2	2	2	2	2	2	3	3	3	2	2	2	2	2	2	2	2	2	2	2

Source: Competitive matches
A = Away; H = Home; W = Win; D = Draw; L = Loss

==== Results by opponent ====
Team	1–22		23–32		Points
Team	1	2	1	2	Points
Croatia Zagreb	1–0	0–2	1–2	1–1	4
Hrvatski Dragovoljac	1–0	1–3	0–1	1–0	6
Mladost 127	0–0	3–2	—	—	4
Osijek	0–1	2–2	2–0	0–2	10
Rijeka	2–1	1–1	—	—	4
Samobor	2–0	2–1	—	—	6
Slaven Belupo	3–0	3–0	—	—	6
Šibenik	3–0	4–1	—	—	6
Varteks	3–0	1–2	—	—	3
Zadarkomerc	1–0	1–2	5–2	2–4	6
NK Zagreb	2–1	1–1	2–1	3–3	8

Source: 1997–98 Croatian First Football League article

== Matches ==
=== Prva HNL ===
Round	Date	Venue	Opponent	Score	Attendance	Hajduk Scorers	Report
1	3 Aug	H	Varteks	2 – 0	7,000	Erceg (2)	HRnogomet.com
2	8 Aug	A	Osijek	0 – 1	10,000		HRnogomet.com
3	17 Aug	H	Šibenik	3 – 0	5,000	Leko, Erceg (2)	HRnogomet.com
4	22 Aug	H	Croatia Zagreb	1 – 0	30,000	Vučko	HRnogomet.com
5	31 Aug	A	Samobor	2 – 0	4,000	Erceg, Vučko	HRnogomet.com
6	12 Sep	H	Rijeka	2 – 1	5,000	Bulat, Erceg	HRnogomet.com
7	21 Sep	A	Zadarkomerc	1 – 0	10,000	Vučko	Slobodna Dalmacija
8	26 Sep	H	Hrvatski Dragovoljac	1 – 0	5,000	Računica	HRnogomet.com
9	5 Oct	A	Slaven Belupo	3 – 0	5,000	Jozinović, Bulat, Erceg	HRnogomet.com
10	19 Oct	H	NK Zagreb	2 – 1	5,000	Erceg, Sarr	HRnogomet.com
11	24 Oct	A	Mladost 127	0 – 0	4,000		HRnogomet.com
12	2 Nov	A	Varteks	1 – 2	5,000	Jozinović	HRnogomet.com
13	9 Nov	H	Osijek	2 – 2	4,000	Sedloski, Erceg	HRnogomet.com
14	19 Nov	A	Šibenik	4 – 1	5,000	Erceg (2), Tudor, Brajković	HRnogomet.com
16	29 Nov	H	Samobor	2 – 1	2,000	Brajković, Vučko	HRnogomet.com
17	7 Dec	A	Rijeka	1 – 1	7,000	Vučko	HRnogomet.com
15	18 Feb	A	Croatia Zagreb	0 – 2	25,000		HRnogomet.com
18	22 Feb	H	Zadarkomerc	1 – 2	3,000	Paço	HRnogomet.com
19	2 Mar	AR	Hrvatski Dragovoljac	1 – 3	2,500	Islami	Slobodna Dalmacija; HRnogomet.com
20	8 Mar	H	Slaven Belupo	3 – 0	3,000	Računica, Međimorec (o.g.), Paço	HRnogomet.com
21	11 Mar	A	NK Zagreb	1 – 1	4,000	Mladenović	HRnogomet.com
22	15 Mar	H	Mladost 127	3 – 2	4,000	Paço, Bulat, Mladenović	HRnogomet.com
23	22 Mar	H	Osijek	2 – 0	7,000	Skoko, Paço	Slobodna Dalmacija
24	29 Mar	A	Croatia Zagreb	1 – 2	18,000	Mladenović	HRnogomet.com
25	5 Apr	H	Zadarkomerc	5 – 2	5,000	Paço, Demirović, Skoko (2), Računica	HRnogomet.com
26	8 Apr	H	NK Zagreb	2 – 1	4,000	Tudor, Skoko	HRnogomet.com
27	11 Apr	AR	Hrvatski Dragovoljac	0 – 1	3,500		HRnogomet.com
28	19 Apr	A	Osijek	0 – 2	12,000		HRnogomet.com
29	26 Apr	H	Croatia Zagreb	1 – 1	20,000	Skoko	HRnogomet.com
30	29 Apr	A	Zadarkomerc	2 – 4	3,500	Mladenović, Demirović	HRnogomet.com
31	3 May	A	NK Zagreb	3 – 3	2,000	Demirović (2), Računica	HRnogomet.com
32	10 May	H	Hrvatski Dragovoljac	1 – 0	8,000	Sarr	HRnogomet.com

Source: hajduk.hr

=== Croatian Football Cup ===
Round	Date	Venue	Opponent	Score	Attendance	Hajduk Scorers	Report
R1	3 Sep	A	Posedarje	3 – 1	3,000	Skoko, Islami, Sarr	HRnogomet.com
R2	15 Oct	H	Slaven Belupo	3 – 1	4,000	Računica (2), Erceg	HRnogomet.com
QF	3 Dec	H	Mladost 127	2 – 1	500	Tudor, Računica	HRnogomet.com
QF	14 Dec	A	Mladost 127	1 – 0	4,000	Vučko	HRnogomet.com
SF	1 Apr	A	Varteks	1 – 2	6,000	Mladenović	HRnogomet.com
SF	15 Apr	H	Varteks	0 – 1	7,000		HRnogomet.com

Source: hajduk.hr

=== UEFA Cup ===
Round	Date	Venue	Opponent	Score	Attendance	Hajduk Scorers	Report
QR1	23 Jul	A (Luxembourg)	Grevenmacher (Luxembourg)	4 – 1	1,000	Erceg, Tudor, Vulić (2)	UEFA.com
QR1	29 Jul	H	Grevenmacher (Luxembourg)	2 – 0	8,000	Bulat, Erceg	UEFA.com
QR2	12 Aug	H	Malmö (Sweden)	3 – 2	20,000	Skoko, Sedloski, Sarr	UEFA.com
QR2	25 Aug	A (Sweden)	Malmö (Sweden)	2 – 0	8,000	Vučko, Erceg	UEFA.com
R1	16 Sep	A (Germany)	Schalke 04 (Germany)	0 – 2	53,250		UEFA.com
R1	30 Sep	H	Schalke 04 (Germany)	2 – 3	25,000	Vulić, Računica	UEFA.com

Source: hajduk.hr

== Player seasonal records ==
=== Top scorers ===
Rank	Name	League	Europe	Cup	Total
1	(Croatia) Tomislav Erceg	11	3	1	15
2	(Croatia) Dean Računica	4	1	3	8
3	(Croatia) Jurica Vučko	5	1	1	7
4	(Australia) Josip Skoko	5	1	1	6
5	(Croatia) Mladen Mladenović	4	–	1	5
5	(Albania) Viktor Paço	5	–	–	5
7	(Bosnia and Herzegovina) Enes Demirović	4	–	–	4
8	(Liberia) Mass Sarr	2	1	1	4
8	(Croatia) Igor Tudor	2	1	1	4
10	(Croatia) Josip Bulat	3	1	–	3
10	(Croatia) Kazimir Vulić	–	3	–	3
12	(Croatia) Elvis Brajković	2	–	–	2
12	(North Macedonia) Irfan Islami	1	–	1	2
12	(Croatia) Darko Jozinović	2	–	–	2
12	(North Macedonia) Goce Sedloski	1	1	–	2
16	(Croatia) Ivan Leko	1	–	–	1
	Own goals	1	–	–	1
	TOTALS	53	13	10	76

Source: Competitive matches

== See also ==
- 1997–98 Croatian First Football League
- 1997–98 Croatian Football Cup

== External sources ==
- 1997–98 Prva HNL at HRnogomet.com
- 1997–98 Croatian Cup at HRnogomet.com
- 1997–98 UEFA Cup at rsssf.com
