= 1998–99 Croatian Football Cup =

Tournament details
- Country: Croatia
- Teams: 48

Final positions
- Champions: Osijek (1st title)
- Runners-up: Cibalia

Tournament statistics
- Top goal scorer: Željko Pakasin (5)

The 1998–99 Croatian Football Cup was the eighth edition of Croatia's football knockout competition. Croatia Zagreb were the defending champions, and it was won by Osijek. This was the first season when a preliminary round was played, with top-level clubs entering the competition in the first round proper.

== Calendar ==
Round	Main date	Number of fixtures	Clubs	New entries this round
Preliminary round	19 August 1998	16	48 → 32	none
First round	6 and 15 September 1998	16	32 → 16	16
Second round	23 and 29 September 1998	8	16 → 8	none
Quarter-finals	28 October and 25 November 1998	8	8 → 4	none
Semi-finals	3 March and 17 March 1999	4	4 → 2	none
Final	30 May 1999	2	2 → 1	none

== Preliminary round ==
Tie no	Home team	Score	Away team
1	Mosor	11–0	Daruvar
2	Valpovka	1–2	Samobor
3	Čakovec	3–0	Croatia Đakovo
4	Slavonija Požega	5–0	Spartak Vest
5	Dugo Selo	2–1	Posavina Zagreb
6	Halubjan Viškovo	3–0	Dugopolje
7	Podravac	2–1	Slunj
8	Ivančica	1–4	Slaven Belupo
9	Bojovnik 7	1–0	Slavonac
10	Pazinka	1–0	Varaždin
11	Zagora Unešić	0–2	Moslavina
12	Amater Slavonski Brod	6–1	Mladost Hrastovec
13	Istra Pula	3–2	Graničar Županja
14	Raštane	2–0	Nehaj Senj
15	TŠK Topolovac	4–0	Neretva
16	Špansko	0–1	Mladost 127

== First round ==
Tie no	Home team	Score	Away team
1	Dugo Selo	3–2	Croatia Zagreb
2	Bojovnik 7	2–3	Hajduk Split
3	TŠK Topolovac	0–1	Varteks
4	Amater Slavonski Brod	2–2 (4–2 p)	NK Zagreb
5	Halubjan	1–2	Rijeka
6	Mosor	0–1 (aet)	Osijek
7	Podravac	1–5	Zadarkomerc
8	Moslavina	2–3	Segesta
9	Raštane	2–0	Inker Zaprešić
10	Čakovec	2–0	Dubrovnik
11	Samobor	1–2	Hrvatski Dragovoljac
12	Pazinka	0–6	Cibalia
13	Slavonija Požega	0–3	Belišće
14	Istra Pula	1–1 (1–4 p)	Šibenik
15	Mladost 127	4–2	Bjelovar
16	Marsonia	0–4	Slaven Belupo

== Second round ==
Tie no	Home team	Score	Away team
1	Slaven Belupo	8–0	Dugo Selo
2	Hajduk Split	5–1	Mladost 127
3	Šibenik	0–1	Varteks
4	Belišće	4–1	Amater Slavonski Brod
5	Cibalia	1–0	Rijeka
6	Osijek	3–1	Hrvatski Dragovoljac
7	Čakovec	0–0 (5–4 p)	Zadarkomerc
8	Segesta	4–0	Raštane

== Quarter-finals ==
Team 1	Agg.	Team 2	1st leg	2nd leg
Slaven Belupo	5–1	Segesta	4–1	1–0
Čakovec	0–2	Hajduk Split	0–0	0–2
Varteks	2–4	Osijek	2–1	0–3
Belišće	0–7	Cibalia	0–4	0–3

== Semi-finals ==
3 March 1999
15:00

Cibalia	2–1	Hajduk Split
Jurčec 53'; Crnčević 58'	Report	Baturina 38'

Stadion HNK Cibalia, Vinkovci
Attendance: 5,000
Referee: Goran Marić (Zagreb)
17 March 1999
17:00

Hajduk Split	2–1	Cibalia
Ratković 73'; Deranja 81'	Report; Penalties	Jurčec 63'
Penalties
Pralija (penalty scored); Vučko (penalty scored); Računica (penalty scored); Deranja (penalty scored); Erceg (penalty scored); Skoko (penalty missed)	5–6	(penalty scored) Meštrović; (penalty scored) Crnčević; (penalty scored) Sablić; (penalty scored) Raić-Sudar; (penalty scored) Andričević; (penalty scored) Bartolović

Stadion Poljud, Split
Attendance: 4,000
Referee: Ante Kulušić (Šibenik)

3–3 on aggregate. Cibalia won 6–5 in penalty shootout.

3 March 1999
17:00

Osijek	1–0	Slaven Belupo
Beširević 90' (pen.)	Report

Stadion Gradski vrt, Osijek
Attendance: 2,500
Referee: Šime Vukić (Rijeka)
17 March 1999
15:00

Slaven Belupo	0–0	Osijek
	Report

Gradski stadion, Koprivnica
Attendance: 3,000
Referee: Reno Sinovčić (Zadar)

Osijek won 1–0 on aggregate.

== Final ==
30 May 1999
18:00

Cibalia	1–2 (a.e.t.)	Osijek
Jurić 35'	Report (in Croatian)	Mitu 90+3'; Lasić 97'

Stadion Maksimir, Zagreb
Attendance: 7,000
Referee: Reno Sinovčić (Zadar)

== See also ==
- 1998–99 Croatian First Football League
- 1998–99 Croatian Second Football League
