= Mujdža =

Mujdža is a surname. Notable people with the surname include:

- Jasmin Mujdža (born 1974), Bosnian footballer, brother of Mensur
- Mensur Mujdža (born 1984), Bosnian footballer
