= Čutura =

Čutura is a South Slavic surname literally meaning "canteen". Notable people with the surname include:

- Dalibor Čutura (born 1975), Serbian handball player and coach
- Mario Čutura (born 1978), Croatian footballer
- Zoran Čutura (born 1962), Croatian basketball player

== See also ==
- Čuturilo
- Čotra (same literal meaning, in Turkish)
