= 1999–2000 Croatian First Football League =

Croatian First Football League
- Season: 1999–2000
- Champions: Dinamo Zagreb; 6th Croatian title 10th domestic title
- Runner up: Hajduk Split
- Relegated: Istra Pula; Vukovar '91
- Champions League: Dinamo Zagreb; Hajduk Split
- UEFA Cup: Osijek; Rijeka
- Intertoto Cup: Slaven Belupo; Cibalia
- Matches: 198
- Goals: 534 (2.7 per match)
- Best player: Ivan Bošnjak
- Top goalscorer: Tomislav Šokota (21)
- Biggest home win: Croatia 5–0 Vukovar '91; Croatia 5–0 Dragovoljac; Hajduk 5–0 Zagreb
- Biggest away win: Dragovoljac 0–5 Hajduk; Istra 0–5 Hajduk; Slaven B. 0–5 Dinamo
- Highest scoring: Slaven B. 5–2 Osijek; Cibalia 5–2 Vukovar '91
- Average attendance: 2,470

The 1999–2000 Croatian First Football League was the ninth season of the Croatian First Football League, also known as 1. HNL, the national championship for men's association football teams in Croatia, since its establishment in 1992. The season started on 24 July 1999 and ended on 13 May 2000. Dinamo Zagreb (Croatia Zagreb in fall season) were the defending champions, having won their ninth championship title the previous season, and they defended the title again, after a win against Rijeka on 6 May 2000.

== Teams ==
=== Stadia and locations ===
Locations of teams in 1999–2000 Prva HNL

Stadium	City	Home club	Capacity
Stadion Maksimir	Zagreb	Dinamo Zagreb	37,168
Stadion Poljud	Split	Hajduk Split	35,000
Stadion Gradski vrt	Osijek	Osijek	19,500
Stadion Varteks	Varaždin	Varteks	10,800
Stadion Kantrida	Rijeka	Rijeka	10,275
Stadion HNK Cibalia	Vinkovci	Cibalia	9,920
Stadion Kranjčevićeva	Zagreb	NK Zagreb	8,850
Stadion Šubićevac	Šibenik	Šibenik	8,000
Gradski Stadion u Borovu naselju	Vukovar	Vukovar '91	6,000
Stadion Stanko Vlajnić-Dida, Stadion ŠRC Zaprešić	Slavonski Brod, Zaprešić	Hrvatski Dragovoljac	5,000
Gradski stadion u Koprivnici	Koprivnica	Slaven Belupo	4,000
Stadion Veruda	Pula	Istra	3,000

== League table ==
Pos	Team	Pld	W	D	L	GF	GA	GD	Pts	Qualification or relegation
1	Dinamo Zagreb (C)	33	23	6	4	83	25	+58	75	Qualification to Champions League third qualifying round
2	Hajduk Split	33	17	10	6	58	30	+28	61	Qualification to Champions League second qualifying round
3	Osijek	33	15	8	10	55	49	+6	53	Qualification to UEFA Cup first round
4	Rijeka	33	14	7	12	54	39	+15	49	Qualification to UEFA Cup qualifying round
5	Slaven Belupo	33	12	13	8	34	34	0	49	Qualification to Intertoto Cup first round
6	Cibalia	33	11	12	10	42	39	+3	45	Qualification to Intertoto Cup first round
7	Varteks	33	10	10	13	32	44	−12	40	
8	NK Zagreb	33	9	12	12	42	49	−7	39	
9	Šibenik	33	8	10	15	33	50	−17	34	
10	Hrvatski Dragovoljac	33	8	9	16	36	58	−22	33	
11	Istra Pula (R)	33	8	6	19	33	61	−28	30	Relegation to Croatian Second Football League
12	Vukovar '91 (R)	33	7	9	17	32	56	−24	30	Relegation to Croatian Second Football League

Source: RSSSF.org
Rules for classification: 1st points; 2nd goal difference; 3rd goals scored
For deciding champions, qualification to UEFA competitions and relegation: 1st points; 2nd head-to-head points; 3rd head-to-head goal difference; 4th head-to-head away goals scored
(C) Champions; (R) Relegated

== Results ==
The schedule consisted of three rounds. During the first two rounds, each team played each other once home and away for a total of 22 matches. The pairings of the third round were then set according to the standings after the first two rounds, giving every team a third game against each opponent for a total of 33 games per team.

Home \ Away	CIB	DIN	HAJ	HRD	IST	OSI	RIJ	SLA	ŠIB	VAR	VUK	ZAG	CIB	DIN	HAJ	HRD	IST	OSI	RIJ	SLA	ŠIB	VAR	VUK	ZAG
Cibalia		1–4	2–2	2–0	3–1	2–3	0–0	0–0	3–0	3–1	0–1	0–0			0–0				1–1	0–0	4–2	2–0	5–2	
Dinamo Zagreb	2–0		0–0	5–0	3–1	3–1	1–1	5–1	3–1	4–1	5–0	2–2	3–0		3–1	3–0	2–0		2–0			0–1		
Hajduk Split	1–1	1–1		0–3	1–0	5–4	3–2	1–0	3–1	2–0	2–0	3–0						1–0		0–0	0–3	0–0	4–0	5–0
Hrvatski Dragovoljac	2–0	2–4	0–5		1–0	3–0	0–4	2–2	1–1	0–1	1–1	1–2	2–1		0–0		2–0		0–1	0–2				
Istra Pula	3–0	0–4	0–5	4–5		1–1	1–0	0–2	0–0	0–2	3–0	0–0	0–1		1–1				2–1	0–1			4–3	
Osijek	1–1	1–3	2–0	2–1	1–0		3–2	2–1	3–0	1–1	2–1	0–0	3–0	1–4		4–2	3–1		2–0			0–0		
Rijeka	1–3	3–1	1–2	4–2	4–1	0–1		1–1	3–1	2–0	2–0	2–0			2–0					3–1	2–0	4–0	0–0	2–3
Slaven Belupo	1–0	0–5	0–0	0–1	1–1	1–4	2–2		0–0	2–1	1–2	1–1		2–0				5–2			2–1		1–0	2–0
Šibenik	2–2	1–1	1–3	0–0	0–1	0–2	0–2	0–0		2–0	2–1	2–0		2–1		2–0	3–0	1–1						2–1
Varteks	0–3	0–3	3–2	0–0	4–1	2–0	2–1	0–1	0–0		2–0	1–1				1–1	1–2			0–0	1–1		3–2	
Vukovar '91	0–0	0–0	0–2	1–0	1–3	3–1	0–0	0–0	3–0	2–2		3–4		0–3		2–0		1–1			2–1			1–1
NK Zagreb	0–0	0–1	0–3	3–3	1–1	2–1	4–1	0–1	4–1	1–0	1–0		1–2	1–2		1–1	4–1	2–2				1–2		

Source: RSSSF.org
Legend: Blue = home team win; Yellow = draw; Red = away team win.

== Top goalscorers ==
Rank	Player	Club	Goals
1	(Croatia) Tomo Šokota	Dinamo Zagreb	21
2	(Croatia) Ivan Bošnjak	Cibalia	16
3	(Croatia) Boško Balaban	Rijeka	15
4	(Croatia) Josip Šimić	Dinamo Zagreb	14
5	(Croatia) Mate Baturina	Hajduk Split	13
5	(Croatia) Stanko Bubalo	Osijek	13
5	(Bosnia and Herzegovina) Marijo Dodik	Slaven Belupo	13
8	(Croatia) Klaudio Vuković	Šibenik	12
9	(Croatia) Ivan Leko	Hajduk Split	11
10	(Croatia) Vlatko Đolonga	Hrvatski Dragovoljac	10
10	(Bosnia and Herzegovina) Admir Hasančić	Rijeka	10
10	(Albania) Amarildo Zela	Vukovar '91	10

== See also ==
- 1999–2000 Croatian Second Football League
- 1999–2000 Croatian Football Cup
