= Davor Lasić =

Croatian footballer

Personal information
- Full name: Davor Lasić
- Date of birth: 15 November 1966 (age 59)
- Place of birth: Brinje, SR Croatia, SFR Yugoslavia
- Position: Defender

Senior career*
Years	Team	Apps	(Gls)
1992–1996	Istra Pula	109	(9)
1997	Orijent	13	(2)
1997–1999	Osijek	44	(0)
1999–2004	Istra 1961		

Managerial career
- 2010: Istra 1961
- * Club domestic league appearances and goals

Davor Lasić (born 15 November 1966) is a Croatian former footballer who played as a defender. He is famous for his golden goal scored in the 1998–99 Croatian Football Cup final which earned Osijek the title. In 2010 he briefly coached Istra 1961 in replacement of Robert Jarni.

== Honours ==
=== Player ===
Osijek

- Croatian Cup: 1998–99
