= Pablo Munhoz =

Uruguayan footballer (born 1982)

Personal information
- Full name: Pablo Roberto Munhoz Rodríguez
- Date of birth: 31 August 1982 (age 44)
- Place of birth: Rivera, Uruguay
- Height: 1.75 m (5 ft 9 in)
- Position: Attacking midfielder

Team information
- Current team: Piriápolis F.C.

Youth career
- Defensor Sporting

Senior career*
Years	Team	Apps	(Gls)
2001–2004	Defensor Sporting	67	(4)
2004–2007	Hajduk Split	50	(9)
2007	Nacional	3	(0)
2008	Wuhan Guanggu	10	(1)
2008–2009	Juventud Las Piedras	18	(3)
2009	Atenas San Carlos		
2010–2011	El Tanque Sisley	16	(2)
2011–2012	GC Biaschesi	1	(0)
2012	CRAC		
2013	Huracán F.C.	6	(0)
2014–2015	Progreso	25	(6)
2015–2016	Deportivo Maldonado	14	(1)
2017–2022	Piriápolis F.C.		

International career^{‡}
	Uruguay U-23	3	(1)
2003	Uruguay	2	(0)
- * Club domestic league appearances and goals as of 24 December 2018 ‡ National team caps and goals as of 30 September 2011

Pablo Roberto Munhoz Rodríguez (born 31 August 1982 in Rivera) is a Uruguayan football midfielder playing for Piriápolis F.C..

== Club career ==
Munhoz played much of his early career with Defensor Sporting in the Uruguayan Primera División before signing in 2004 with Croatian club Hajduk where he played three seasons and helped them win the 2005 Championship. In summer 2007 he went back to Uruguay to play with Uruguayan club Club Nacional de Football, but by the end of the year he was on his way to China to sign with Wuhan Optics Valley F.C. (known then as Wuhan Guanggu). However, that season the club withdrew from the Chinese Super League and in consequence was punished by the Chinese Federation. Munhoz left China and returned to Uruguay playing for a number of clubs, such as Juventud de Las Piedras, Atenas de San Carlos and in 2010 he signed for El Tanque Sisley returning to the Uruguayan top league. In the summer of 2011 he returned to Europe, this time to play with GC Biaschesi in the Swiss 1. Liga Group 3. He joined Brazilian club CRAC on 3 January 2012.

Between 2013 and 2016 Munhoz spent three seasons in the second tier of Uruguayan football, playing for Huracán F.C., Progreso, and Deportivo Maldonado. As of 2017 Munhoz was in Piriápolis, running his Negrol football school for children and playing for the local lower-tier team Piriápolis F.C..

== International career ==
Munhoz made two appearances for the Uruguay national team in 2003.
