= Enes Demirović =

Bosnian-Herzegovinian footballer

Personal information
- Full name: Enes Demirović
- Date of birth: 13 June 1972 (age 54)
- Place of birth: Banovići, SFR Yugoslavia
- Height: 1.82 m (6 ft 0 in)
- Position: Midfielder

Senior career*
| Years | Team | Apps | (Gls) |
| 1994–1995 | Triglav Kranj | 11 | (4) |
| 1995–1997 | Gorica | 76 | (11) |
| 1998 | Hajduk Split | 18 | (4) |
| 1998 | Adanaspor | 10 | (1) |
| 1998–2000 | İstanbulspor | 36 | (2) |
| 2000–2002 | Hapoel Petah Tikva | 69 | (11) |
| 2002–2003 | Hapoel Kfar Saba | 28 | (1) |
| 2003–2005 | Ironi Kiryat Shmona | 30 | (8) |
| 2005–2011 | Gorica | 153 | (48) |
| 2011–2013 | Brda | | |
| 2013–2014 | Adria | 12 | (0) |

International career
| 1995–2001 | Bosnia and Herzegovina | 13 | (0) |
- * Club domestic league appearances and goals

Enes Demirović (born 13 June 1972) is a retired Bosnian-Herzegovinian footballer.

== International career ==
He made his debut in Bosnia and Herzegovina's first ever official international game, a November 1995 friendly match away against Albania, and has earned a total of 13 caps, scoring no goals. His final international was a June 2001 FIFA World Cup qualification match against Spain.
