= Niko Peraić =

Croatian footballer

Personal information
- Full name: Niko Peraić
- Date of birth: 21 September 1988 (age 38)
- Place of birth: Polača, SFR Yugoslavia
- Height: 1.83 m (6 ft 0 in)
- Position: Right back

Youth career
- –2003: HNK Primorac (BnM)
- 2003–2007: Hajduk Split

Senior career*
Years	Team	Apps	(Gls)
2007	Hajduk Split	5	(1)
2008	Junak Sinj	10	(1)
2009–2012	Raštane	45	(4)
2010	→ Zadar (loan)	10	(0)
2012–2015	Polača	60	(10)
- * Club domestic league appearances and goals

Niko Peraić (born 21 September 1988 in Polača) is a retired Croatian football defender, who last played for NK Polača.

== Club career ==
Peraić made his first team debut for Hajduk Split in the Prva HNL in May 2007, coming off the bench and scoring in a 2–2 draw with Rijeka, making him one of the youngest players to score for the club in a Croatian league match, at the age of 19 years, 2 months and 3 days. He would feature in four further matches in 2007, before being released by the club. A short spell at Junak followed, before joining the third-tier Raštane, then at its peak. Peraić would play in the top tier in late 2010, on a loan at Zadar, but after returning to Raštane in early 2011, he suffered head injuries in a car crash, together with teammate Šime Čirjak, resulting in a lengthy recuperation period. Subsequently, he joined his local club HNK Polača, where he would play his last games in 2015.
