= Viktor Paço =

Albanian footballer

Personal information
- Full name: Viktor Paço
- Date of birth: 7 December 1971 (age 54)
- Place of birth: Vlorë, Albania
- Height: 1.86 m (6 ft 1 in)
- Position: Forward

Youth career
- 1989–1990: Flamurtari Vlorë

Senior career*
| Years | Team | Apps | (Gls) |
| 1990–1991 | Flamurtari | 12 | (4) |
| 1991–1992 | Atlético Madrid B | 0 | (0) |
| 1992–1994 | AEK Athens | 0 | (0) |
| 1992–1994 | →Proodeftiki (loan) | | |
| 1994–1995 | Nea Salamis Famagusta | 27 | (11) |
| 1995–1996 | AEK Larnaca | 25 | (12) |
| 1996 | Flamurtari | 13 | (14) |
| 1997 | Maribor | 24 | (14) |
| 1998 | Hajduk Split | 16 | (5) |
| 1998 | Hapoel Jerusalem | 13 | (9) |
| 1999 | Maccabi Haifa | 14 | (4) |
| 1999–2000 | Beitar Jerusalem | 37 | (13) |
| 2000–2001 | Hapoel Haifa | 32 | (8) |
| 2001–2002 | Beitar Jerusalem | 28 | (8) |
| 2002 | Kocaelispor | 3 | (0) |
| 2003 | Rochester Rhinos | 12 | (2) |

International career
| 1996–1997 | Albania | 4 | (0) |
- * Club domestic league appearances and goals

Viktor Paço (born 7 December 1971 in Vlorë) is an Albanian retired international football player.

== Club career ==
A much-travelled striker, Paço has played for hometown club Flamurtari as well as in Greece, Cyprus, Slovenia, Croatia, Israël, Turkey and the United States. He was topscorer in the interrupted 1996–97 Albanian Superliga season with 14 goals in 13 matches without playing in the play-off finals as he had already left the club for Slovenian side Maribor Branik during the 1997 Pyramid crisis.

== International career ==
He made his debut for Albania in an October 1996 FIFA World Cup qualification match against Portugal in Tirana and earned a total of 4 caps, scoring no goals. His final international was an August 1997 World Cup qualification match away against Ukraine.

== Personal life ==
Currently he lives in the United States with his wife Enkela and their two children, where he is coaching youth soccer in the Rochester, New York area.

== Honours ==
Flamurtari

- Albanian Superliga: 1991

NK Maribor

- Slovenian PrvaLiga: 1997

== External sources ==
- Viktor Paço at National-Football-Teams.com
- Profile at TFF.
