= Davor Bagarić =

Croatian footballer (born 1985)

Personal information
- Full name: Davor Bagarić
- Date of birth: 8 September 1985 (age 41)
- Place of birth: Osijek, SFR Yugoslavia
- Height: 1.79 m (5 ft 10 1/2 in)
- Positions: Left back; left winger

Youth career
- Cibalia

Senior career*
Years	Team	Apps	(Gls)
2004–2010	Cibalia	136	(17)
2010–2011	Slaven Belupo	22	(3)
2011–2013	Koper	44	(5)
2013	Olimpija Ljubljana	8	(0)
2014–2015	Inter Zaprešić	27	(3)
2017	Dinamo Apatija		

International career
2003	Croatia U19	1	(0)
2004	Croatia U20	5	(0)
2000–2004	Croatia U21	4	(1)
- * Club domestic league appearances and goals

Davor Bagarić (born 8 September 1985) is a Croatian retired footballer who last played for Dinamo Apatija.

== Club career ==
After coming out of the Cibalia youth academy, Bagarić debuted for the first team during the 2004–05 season in the Druga HNL, helping the team return to the top division. He remained a regular player in the team for the following five seasons in the top level, only missing parts of the 2008–09 and 2009–10 seasons due to injury. In the summer of 2010, he transferred to Slaven Belupo, where he gained a place in the first eleven after the first few rounds.

Bagarić moved abroad in the summer of 2011, signing for Slovenian team Koper, where he stayed for two seasons, before moving to Olimpija Ljubljana. His contract with Olimpija was terminated in November 2013.

In January 2014, he signed a contract with the Druga HNL team Inter Zaprešić.
