= Alen Mrzlečki =

Croatian footballer

Personal information
- Full name: Alen Mrzlečki
- Date of birth: 13 May 1974 (age 52)
- Place of birth: Bjelovar, SFR Yugoslavia
- Height: 1.91 m (6 ft 3 in)
- Position: Defender

Senior career*
Years	Team	Apps	(Gls)
1995–1998	Mladost 127	78	(8)
1998–1999	Hajduk Split	15	(1)
1999–2000	Šibenik	33	(0)
2001	Harelbeke	15	(1)
2001–2002	Lokeren	0	(0)
2002–2003	KV Mechelen	11	(0)
2003–2004	Bjelovar	21	(0)
2006–2007	NK Pitomača		
2007–2011	Vrbovec	127	(9)
2011–2012	Bjelovar	28	(1)
2012–2014	Croatia Grabrovnica		

Managerial career
- 2015-2016: Croatia Grabrovnica
- 2016-2017: NK Pitomača
- 2017-2018: Bjelovar
- 2018-2021: Bjelovar (youth)
- * Club domestic league appearances and goals as of 30 December 2008

Alen Mrzlečki (born 13 May 1974, in Bjelovar) is a Croatian football manager and retired player who last played for NK Bjelovar.

== Club career ==
Mrzlečki started his career at Mladost 2014, then played for Hajduk and Šibenik. He spent several years abroad playing for Belgian clubs Harelbeke, Lokeren, Mechelen, and upon his return to Croatia he played again for Bjelovar, Pitomača and Vrbovec. He ended his playing career in 2011 with a game in Suhopolje.

== Managerial career ==
Mrzlečki was dismissed as manager of hometown club Bjelovar in October 2018. In November 2021 he was relieved of his duties again by the club, this time while in charge of the club's junior team.

== Personal life ==
Mrzlečki has been married to TV presenter Marta Šimić since 2000 and the couple have a son named Adam and live between Bjelovar and Zagreb.
