= Josip Balatinac =

Croatian association football player

Personal information
- Date of birth: 7 March 1979 (age 47)
- Place of birth: Kneževo, SFR Yugoslavia
- Height: 1.70 m (5 ft 7 in)
- Position: Midfielder

Youth career
- Osijek

Senior career*
Years	Team	Apps	(Gls)
1997–2006	Osijek	202	(29)
2006–2007	Hajduk Split	16	(3)
2008	Hrvatski Dragovoljac	7	(0)
2008–2009	Baranja Belje		
2009–2010	Šokadija Duboševica		
2010–2016	Mladost Draž		

International career^{‡}
1998	Croatia U19	5	(0)
1999	Croatia U20	1	(0)
1998–2000	Croatia U21	7	(0)
2006	Croatia	1	(0)
- * Club domestic league appearances and goals as of 21:28, 16 December 2009 (UTC) ‡ National team caps and goals as of 21:28, 16 December 2009 (UTC)

Josip Balatinac (born 7 March 1979) is a Croatian retired football midfielder.

== Club career ==
In 1997 Balatinac joined NK Osijek coming through youth ranks of famous Osijek youth football academy. He spent nine seasons with NK Osijek where he gradually became one of the best players, earning a national team cap. In the summer of 2006 Balatinac was supposed to join SV Pasching. It's still unclear if Balatinac signed the contract and then went AWOL or if he never even signed for Austrian team. However, Balatinac came back from Austria after few days claiming he's homesick and continue to prepare for new season with NK Osijek. Few weeks afterwards he signed with Hajduk Split. The club's financial problems lead to the club owing Balatinac several wages, and he filed for termination of his contract in early 2007, which was approved in the November of that year. He signed with the Druga HNL side NK Hrvatski Dragovoljac where he spent the rest of the 2007/08 season. Subsequently he all but retired for professional football, playing for a string of lower-tier clubs in his native region of Baranja, settling in Draž last playing for NK Mladost.

== International career ==
He made one appearance for the Croatia national football team, in a friendly against South Korea at the 2006 Carlsberg Cup tournament on 29 January 2006. He has also represented his country at under-21 and under-19 levels.
