= Anthony Grdic =

Australian soccer player

Personal information
- Full name: Antun Mile Grdic
- Date of birth: 23 May 1975 (age 51)
- Place of birth: Brisbane, Australia
- Position: Defender

Senior career*
Years	Team	Apps	(Gls)
1992	Wollongong United	8	(0)
1993-1999	Šibenik	101+	(2+)
1999-2000	Hajduk	19	(0)
2001-2003	Zhejiang Greentown		
2004	Istra	12	(0)
2006	Kapfenberger SV	9	(0)
- * Club domestic league appearances and goals

Antun Mile Grdic (born 23 May 1975) is an Australian former soccer player who is last known to have played as a defender for Kapfenberger SV.

== Career ==
In 1993, Grdic signed for Croatian side Šibenik after playing for Wollongong United in the Australian lower leagues.

In 1999, he signed for Hajduk, one of Croatia's most successful clubs.

Before the 2001 season, Grdic signed for Zhejiang Greentown in the Chinese second division, where he rejected offers from the Chinese top flight.

In 2006, he signed for Kapfenberger SV in the Austrian second division.
