= Jasmin Mujdža =

Bosnia and Herzegovina former footballer

Personal information
- Full name: Jasmin Mujdža
- Date of birth: 2 March 1974 (age 52)
- Place of birth: Zagreb, SR Croatia, Yugoslavia
- Height: 1.83 m (6 ft 0 in)
- Position: Midfielder

Team information
- Current team: FC Seoul (fitness coach)

Senior career*
Years	Team	Apps	(Gls)
1996–1997	Samobor	0	(0)
1997–2000	Hajduk Split	71	(2)
2000–2001	Hapoel Petah Tikva	26	(0)
2001–2002	Zagreb	1	(0)
2002	Ilhwa Chunma	16	(0)
2003–2005	Rijeka	47	(1)
2005–2006	Kamen Ingrad	19	(0)
2006–2007	Zadar	24	(1)
2007–2009	Hrvatski Dragovoljac	50	(2)
2009–2010	Ponikve	17	(0)
2010–2012	Nur Zagreb		

International career
1998–2000	Bosnia and Herzegovina	9	(0)

Managerial career
- 2015: Segesta
- * Club domestic league appearances and goals as of 20 March 2016

Jasmin Mujdža (born 2 March 1974) is a Bosnian football coach and former footballer. From 2011 to 2019, he worked as a fitness and conditioning coach at Gangwon FC, NK Maksimir, Dinamo Tbilisi, FC Seoul, Jiangsu F.C. and Incheon United.

== International career ==
Mujdža made his debut for Bosnia and Herzegovina in May 1998 in a friendly match away against Argentina and has earned a total of 9 caps, scoring no goals. His final international was a friendly against Turkey in August 2000.

== Personal life ==
His younger brother, Mensur, is also a former footballer. He is of the Muslim faith.

== Honours ==
Hajduk Split

- Croatian Cup: 2000

Zagreb

- Prva HNL: 2001-02

Rijeka

- Croatian Cup: 2005

Zadar

- Druga HNL promotion: 2006-07
