= Mario Čutura =

Croatian footballer

Personal information
- Date of birth: 24 April 1978 (age 48)
- Place of birth: Vinkovci, Yugoslavia
- Height: 1.84 m (6 ft 0 in)
- Position: Midfielder

Senior career*
Years	Team	Apps	(Gls)
1996–2000	Cibalia	71	(8)
2000–2002	Dinamo Zagreb	18	(3)
2002–2004	Cibalia	31	(3)
2004–2009	NK Zagreb	120	(9)
2009	Croatia Sesvete	9	(0)

International career
1998	Croatia U-20	2	(1)
1998	Croatia U-21	1	(0)
- * Club domestic league appearances and goals as of 1 August 2010

Mario Čutura (born 24 April 1978) is a Croatian retired football midfielder who last played for Prva HNL side Croatia Sesvete in the 2008–09 season before being released in July 2009.

== International career ==
Internationally Čutura was capped three times for Croatia U20 and Croatia U21 teams.
