= Zoran Ratković =

Croatian footballer

Personal information
- Full name: Zoran Ratković
- Date of birth: 31 December 1978 (age 47)
- Place of birth: Belišće, SR Croatia, SFR Yugoslavia
- Height: 1.75 m (5 ft 9 in)
- Position: Forward

Youth career
- -1989: Podravac Bistrinci
- 1989-1993: Belišće
- 1993-1997: Hajduk Split

Senior career*
Years	Team	Apps	(Gls)
1996–2000	Hajduk Split	21	(0)
2000–2007	Cibalia	135	(24)
2007	Eintracht Braunschweig	3	(0)
2007	Samobor		
2008	Međimurje	14	(1)
2008–2009	Trogir	26	(2)
2009–2019	Belišće	146	(79)

International career^{‡}
1993	Croatia U-14	1	(0)
1994	Croatia U-15	1	(0)
1994–1995	Croatia U-16	2	(1)
1994	Croatia U-17	2	(1)
1997	Croatia U-18	1	(0)
1995–1997	Croatia U-19	5	(0)
1998	Croatia U-20	2	(0)
- * Club domestic league appearances and goals as of 23 April 2012 ‡ National team caps and goals as of 23 April 2012

Zoran Ratković (born 31 December 1978) is a retired Croatian football player.

== Career ==
Ratković was born in Belišće. He started playing at Podravac Bistrinci, moved to NK Belišće at the age of 11. At the age of 14, he was scouted by and moved to Hajduk Split. After eight years Hajduk Split, Ratković moved to Cibalia in 2000.

In 2007, he was signed by German 2. Bundesliga side Eintracht Braunschweig during the winter break. The club was at the bottom of the league at the time, and brought in 11 new players to prevent relegation. However, results did not improve and Braunschweig made the drop to the third division. Ratković left Germany again, after having played only three league games during his brief stay, and returned to Croatia.
