= Domagoj Kosić =

Croatian footballer (born 1975)

Personal information
- Date of birth: 11 November 1975 (age 50)
- Place of birth: Zagreb
- Height: 1.66 m (5 ft 5 in)
- Position: Midfielder

Senior career*
Years	Team	Apps	(Gls)
1993–1994	Pazinka Pazin	16	(0)
1994–1996	Croatia Zagreb	26	(4)
1996	→ Hrvatski Dragovoljac (loan)	5	(1)
1997	Inker Zaprešić	3	(0)
1997	Maccabi Tel Aviv	9	(1)
1998	Šibenik	14	(6)
1998–2001	NK Zagreb	64	(10)
2001–2002	Šibenik	19	(4)
2002–2004	Slaven Belupo	18+	(2+)
2004–2005	Pula 1856	13	(0)
2005–2006	Olimpik Baku	2	(0)
- * Club domestic league appearances and goals

Domagoj Kosić (born 11 November 1975) is a retired Croatian football midfielder.
