= 1999–2000 Croatian Football Cup =

Tournament details
- Country: Croatia
- Teams: 48

Final positions
- Champions: Hajduk Split (3rd title)
- Runners-up: Dinamo Zagreb

Tournament statistics
- Matches played: 54
- Goals scored: 178 (3.3 per match)
- Top goal scorer: Robert Prosinečki (5)

The 1999–2000 Croatian Football Cup was the ninth edition of Croatia's football knockout competition. The first match was played on 4 August 1999 and five rounds were played before the final, which took place over two legs on 2 and 16 May 2000.

Defending champions Osijek reached the competition's quarter finals, but lost to eventual semi-finalists Cibalia.

In the final Hajduk Split beat NK Zagreb over two matches, winning 2–0 at home before losing 1–0 away in the return fixture, therefore winning 2–1 on aggregate.

== Calendar ==
Round	Main date	Number of fixtures	Clubs	New entries this round
Preliminary round	4–15 August 1999	16	48 → 32	none
First round	21 September – 6 October 1999	16	32 → 16	16
Second round	26 October – 11 November 1999	8	16 → 8	none
Quarter-finals	14 and 21 March 2000	8	8 → 4	none
Semi-finals	4 and 18 April 2000	4	4 → 2	none
Final	2 and 16 May 2000	2	2 → 1	none

== Preliminary round ==
The preliminary round was played between 4 and 14 August 1999. The round's highest scoring fixture was the 7–0 home win for Čazmatrans at the expense of Podravac Virje.

Tie no	Home team	Score	Away team
1	RNK Split	3–2	TŠK Topolovac
2	Koprivnica	3–1	Valpovka
3	Pomorac Kostrena	1–1 (aet) (3–4 p)	Marsonia
4	Čazmatrans	7–0	Podravac Virje
5	Mosor	2–0	Čakovec
6	Špansko	4–1	Olimpija Osijek
7	Duga Resa	0–1 (aet)	Omladinac Novo Selo Rok
8	Zagorec Krapina	4–1	Dinara Knin
9	Pazinka	1–2	Neretva
10	Amater Slavonski Brod	1–4	Vukovar '91
11	Moslavac Popovača	2–1	Dubrava
12	BSK Buk	5–0	Hajduk Hercegovac
13	Mladost 127	0–1	Uljanik Pula
14	Pakoštane	2–4	Nehaj Senj
15	Sloboda Varaždin	3–0	PIK Vrbovec
16	Ivančica Ivanec	0–2	Radnik Velika Gorica

== First round ==
The first round was played between 21 September and 6 October 1999. 32 teams were involved in this round. Croatia Zagreb had the biggest win in this round, defeating BSK Buk 10–0 away from home.

Tie no	Home team	Score	Away team
1	Bjelovar	2–1 (aet)	Dubrovnik
2	Neretva	2–1	Inker Zaprešić
3	Moslavac Popovača	0–8	Hajduk Split
4	Koprivnica	1–2 (aet)	Varteks
5	Uljanik Pula	0–2	NK Zagreb
6	Čazmatrans	1–2	Cibalia
7	Vukovar '91	0–1	Slaven Belupo
8	Nehaj Senj	2–2 (aet) (3–2 p)	Zadarkomerc
9	Radnik Velika Gorica	1–2	Rijeka
10	Mosor	0–0 (aet) (6–5 p)	Segesta
11	Sloboda Varaždin	1–2	Hrvatski Dragovoljac
12	BSK Buk	0–10	Croatia Zagreb
13	Zagorec Krapina	3–1	Belišće
14	Špansko	1–2	Šibenik
15	RNK Split	0–4	Marsonia
16	Omladinac Novo Selo Rok	2–3	Osijek

== Second round ==
The second round was played between 26 October and 11 November 1999. 16 teams were involved in this round. NK Zagreb had the biggest win in this round, defeating Neretva 6–0 away from home.

Tie no	Home team	Score	Away team
1	Cibalia	2–1 (aet)	Hrvatski Dragovoljac
2	Nehaj Senj	0–1 (aet)	Rijeka
3	Neretva	0–6	NK Zagreb
4	Hajduk Split	3–1	Šibenik
5	Bjelovar	1–3	Osijek
6	Zagorec Krapina	0–1	Varteks
7	Mosor	0–2	Slaven Belupo
8	Croatia Zagreb	4–0	Marsonia

== Quarter-finals ==
The quarter finals were held on a home and away basis. First legs were held on 14 March 2000 and the return legs took place on 21 March 2000. All four of the ties were decided by a single goal.

Team 1	Agg.	Team 2	1st leg	2nd leg
Rijeka	3–4	Dinamo Zagreb	1–2	2–2
Slaven Belupo	1–2	Hajduk Split	0–0	1–2
Cibalia	2–1	Osijek	2–1	0–0
Varteks	2–3	NK Zagreb	2–1	0–2

== Semi-finals ==
The semi finals were held on a home and away basis. First legs were held on 4 April 2000 and the return legs took place two weeks later on 18 April 2000. Dinamo Zagreb scored six goals across the two matches, advancing past Cibalia, who scored a single goal. In the other semi final, Hajduk Split progressed against NK Zagreb, 4–3 on aggregate.

4 April 2000
16:30

Cibalia	0–3	Dinamo Zagreb
	Report	Kozniku 25'; Bišćan 40'; Mikić 80'

Stadion HNK Cibalia, Vinkovci
Attendance: 5,000
Referee: Željko Širić (Osijek)
18 April 2000
16:30

Dinamo Zagreb	3–1	Cibalia
Cvitanović 17', 45'; Pilipović 62'	Report	Čutura 64'

Stadion Maksimir, Zagreb
Attendance: 400
Referee: Alojzije Šupraha (Split)

Dinamo Zagreb won 6–1 on aggregate.

4 April 2000
18:15

Hajduk Split	2–1	NK Zagreb
Musa 62'; Bilić 85'	Report	Bule 40'

Stadion Poljud, Split
Attendance: 4,000
Referee: Miroslav Vitković (Vinkovci)
18 April 2000
15:30

NK Zagreb	2–2	Hajduk Split
Osibov 15'; Kosić 34'	Report	Vučko 44'; Mihačić 54' (o.g.)

Stadion Kranjčevićeva, Zagreb
Attendance: 3,500
Referee: Željko Širić (Osijek)

Hajduk Split won 4–3 on aggregate.

== Final ==
The final took place between Eternal derby rivals Dinamo Zagreb and Hajduk Split. Each finalist won the home leg of the two-legged final. Zagreb won the cup with a 2–1 aggregate scoreline.

=== First leg ===
2 May 2000
18:00

Hajduk Split	2–0	Dinamo Zagreb
Vučko 38' (pen.), 53'	Report (in Croatian)

Stadion Poljud, Split
Attendance: 20,000
Referee: Draženko Kovačić (Križevci)

=== Second leg ===
16 May 2000
18:30

Dinamo Zagreb	1–0	Hajduk Split
I. Cvitanović 90+2'	Report (in Croatian)

Stadion Maksimir, Zagreb
Attendance: 17,000
Referee: Željko Širić (Osijek)

Hajduk Split won 2–1 on aggregate.

== See also ==
- 1999–2000 Croatian First Football League
- 1999–2000 Croatian Second Football League
