= Igor Musa =

Croatian former central midfielder (born 1973)

Personal information
- Full name: Igor Musa
- Date of birth: 18 October 1973 (age 53)
- Place of birth: Jajce, SFR Yugoslavia
- Height: 1.76 m (5 ft 9 1/2 in)
- Position: Midfielder

Senior career*
Years	Team	Apps	(Gls)
1983–1990	Velež Mostar	4	(0)
1992-1993	HNK Dubrovnik	23	(1)
1994	Samobor		
1994–1998	Hrvatski Dragovoljac	56	(6)
1998–1999	Rijeka	30	(14)
1999–2002	Hajduk Split	73	(11)
2002–2004	Xerez	16	(0)
2004–2006	Slaven Belupo	55	(12)
2006–2007	Hajduk Split	29	(7)
2007–2008	AEL Limassol	18	(1)
2008–2010	Zrinjski	41	(2)

International career
1995	Croatia U21	2	(0)
- * Club domestic league appearances and goals as of 19 May 2007

Igor Musa (born 18 October 1973, Jajce, Bosnia and Herzegovina) is a Croatian former central midfielder.

== Career ==
Born in Jajce, but raised in Bugojno, Musa started his career with Velež Mostar. He went to Hajduk from Slaven Belupo in the summer of 2006 and then to AEL Limassol in July 2007. He was in Hajduk previously in 2001/2002. At end of the season his contract expired and he left for Spanish club Xerez. In 2016, the State Attorney in Split confirmed that it started cooperating with Interpol in investigating that transfer, in which 300,000 euros allegedly disappeared.

He finished his professional football career in his favourite club HŠK Zrinjski Mostar.

== Honours ==
Velež Mostar

- Yugoslav Cup: 1986

Hrvatski Dragovoljac

- Druga HNL (West): 1994–95

Hajduk Split

- Prva HNL: 2000–01
- Croatian Cup: 2000

Zrinjski Mostar

- Premier League of Bosnia and Herzegovina: 2008–09
