= Josip Bulat (footballer, born 1972) =

Croatian former professional footballer

Chairman of the Supervisory Board of HNK Šibenik
- Incumbent
- Assumed office 14 August 2017

Personal details
- Born: 18 March 1972 (age 54) Šibenik, SR Croatia, SFR Yugoslavia
- Height: 1.79 m (5 ft 10 1/2 in)
- Children: 1
Association football career
- Position: Right back
Youth career
- Šibenik
Senior career*
Years	Team	Apps	(Gls)
1988–1997	Šibenik	191	(7)
1997–2000	Hajduk Split	66	(5)
2000–2002	NK Zagreb	48	(2)
2002–2003	Bursaspor	19	(0)
2003–2004	Rijeka	16	(0)
2004	Qingdao Jonoon	16	(1)
2005–2008	Šibenik	40	(2)
Total		397	(17)
International career
1999	Croatia	1	(0)
- * Club domestic league appearances and goals as of 30 December 2008

Josip "Joso" Bulat (pronounced [jǒsip bùlat]; born 18 March 1972) is a Croatian former professional footballer who played as a right back. He is currently working as the chairman of the Supervisory Board of Croatian football club HNK Šibenik since 2017.

== International career ==
Bulat made his debut for Croatia in a June 1999 Korea Cup match against Mexico, the match remained his sole international appearance.

== Personal life ==
His younger brother Ivan was a former footballer, and his son Marko is a professional footballer currently playing for Standard Liege.

== Honours ==
=== Player ===
Hajduk Split

- Croatian Cup: 1999–2000

NK Zagreb

- Croatian First League: 2001–02

Šibenik

- Druga HNL (South): 2005–06
