= Ivan Leko =

Croatian footballer and manager (born 1978)

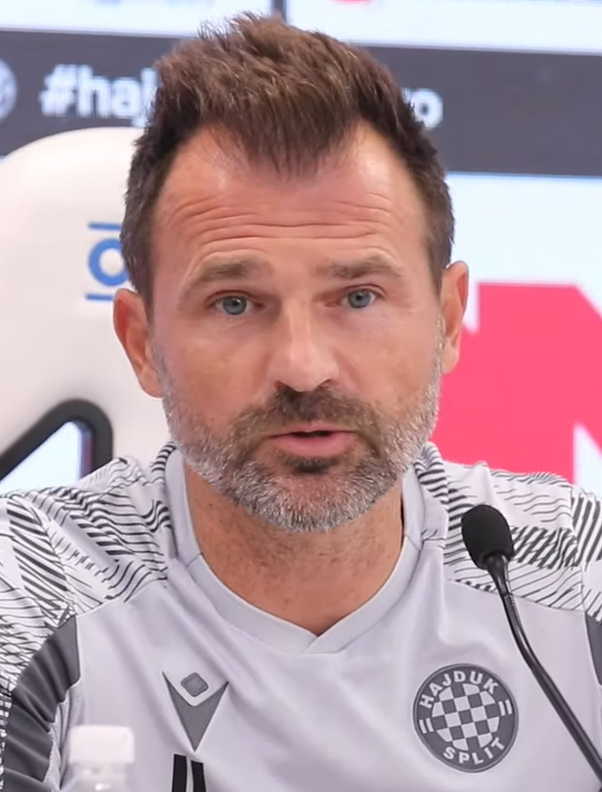
- Leko with Hajduk Split in 2023

Personal information
- Date of birth: 7 February 1978 (age 48)
- Place of birth: Split, SR Croatia, Yugoslavia
- Height: 1.78 m (5 ft 10 in)
- Position: Midfielder

Team information
- Current team: Club Brugge (head coach)

Senior career*
| Years | Team | Apps | (Gls) |
| 1995–2001 | Hajduk Split | 143 | (33) |
| 1996 | → HNK Trogir (loan) | 7 | (3) |
| 2001–2005 | Málaga | 79 | (4) |
| 2005 | Hajduk Split | 14 | (3) |
| 2005–2009 | Club Brugge | 98 | (21) |
| 2009 | → Germinal Beerschot (loan) | 30 | (4) |
| 2009–2014 | Lokeren | 122 | (12) |
| Total | | 493 | (80) |

International career
| 1993–1994 | Croatia U16 | 2 | (0) |
| 1993 | Croatia U17 | 4 | (0) |
| 1994–1995 | Croatia U18 | 3 | (1) |
| 1994–1995 | Croatia U19 | 4 | (0) |
| 1998 | Croatia U20 | 1 | (0) |
| 1994–2000 | Croatia U21 | 21 | (5) |
| 2001 | Croatia B | 1 | (0) |
| 1999–2006 | Croatia | 13 | (0) |

Managerial career
- 2014: OH Leuven
- 2015–2016: PAOK (assistant)
- 2016–2017: Sint-Truiden
- 2017–2019: Club Brugge
- 2019: Al-Ain
- 2020: Antwerp
- 2021–2022: Shanghai Port
- 2023: Hajduk Split
- 2024–2025: Standard Liège
- 2025: KAA Gent
- 2025–: Club Brugge
- * Club domestic league appearances and goals

Ivan Leko (born 7 February 1978) is a Croatian professional football manager and former player who is currently head coach of Belgian Pro League side Club Brugge.

== Club career ==
Leko started his career with his hometown club Hajduk Split and played there for several seasons, before moving to Spain to join Málaga. In his early senior years, he was loaned to HNK Trogir.

In January 2005, Leko returned for a brief stint with Hajduk; in the summer he joined Club Brugge.

On 15 January 2009, he decided to sign a contract for Germinal Beerschot. After his spell in Antwerp, he ended his career at Lokeren.

== International career ==
Leko made his debut for Croatia in a June 1999 Korea Cup match against Egypt, coming on as a 65th-minute substitute for Mario Cvitanović, and earned a total of 13 caps, scoring no goals. He was called up to the squad to participate in the 2006 FIFA World Cup, but played no part in the tournament, as Croatia exited in the group stage. His final international was a June 2006 friendly against Spain.

== Managerial career ==
Leko made his debut as a manager in 2014, with OH Leuven.

In 2015, he became an assistant manager of Greek side PAOK under the coaching staff of Croatian manager Igor Tudor, who was sacked in 2016. For the 2016–17 season, he managed Sint-Truiden; for the next two seasons, 2017–18 and 2018–19, Leko was the manager of Club Brugge. He celebrated Jupiler Pro League and Belgian Super Cup in his first season in Brugge. Also, Leko won the title of Professional Manager of the Year. In October 2018, Belgian police interrogated him for corruption investigation.

In May 2019, Club Brugge and Leko parted ways. The 41-year-old coach had been with the club since 2017. On 1 June 2019, he was appointed at his new club, Al Ain. In December 2019, Leko left Al Ain after a disastrous home defeat against Al Dhafra. Both sides had agreed to end their cooperation after five months of poor play.

On 20 May 2020, Leko was appointed the manager of Royal Antwerp. Taking over the team from Laszlo Bölöni, he led the team to win their first Belgian Cup since 1992, with a 1–0 win against his former side Club Brugge in the final. This earned Antwerp a qualification in the 2020–21 UEFA Europa League group stage for the first time in the club's history, where they were drawn in Group J against Tottenham Hotspur, LASK Linz and Ludogorets Razgrad. Leko led the team to a surprising second-place finish in the group, with four wins and two losses, culminating in a 1–0 home victory against Tottenham on 29 October; as a result, the team qualified for the round of 32, where they were drawn against Rangers. In December 2020, Leko left Royal Antwerp and moved to Shanghai Port, where he took up his new post with the Chinese team, under a two-year contract worth five million euros. In February 2021, Leko was introduced as the new head coach of Shanghai Port at the SAIC Motor Pudong Arena.

On 31 December 2022, he returned to Croatia to coach his former club Hajduk Split; however, he was dismissed on 23 October 2023. On 4 January 2024, he became head coach of Belgian side Standard Liège.

On 4 June 2025, Ivan Leko was officially appointed manager of Belgian Pro League side KAA Gent.

On 8 December 2025, Leko returned to Club Brugge.

== Investigation ==
In October 2018, while at Club Brugge, Leko was interrogated by Belgian police as part of a corruption investigation. In the subsequent court case, the judge demanded to know why Leko had received a payment from Dejan Veljkovic's Cypriot account in 2015. In June 2019, Leko was interrogated all day as part of the investigation into fraud in Belgian football, but was later released.

== Managerial statistics ==
As of match played 21 November 2026

Managerial record by team and tenure
| Team | From | To | Record | | | | |
| Team | From | To | P | W | D | L | Win % |
|---|---|---|---|---|---|---|---|
| OH Leuven | 26 February 2014 | 28 November 2014 | 32 | 16 | 7 | 9 | 50.00 |
| Sint-Truiden | 1 July 2016 | 8 June 2017 | 44 | 16 | 8 | 20 | 36.36 |
| Club Brugge | 8 June 2017 | 2 June 2019 | 99 | 53 | 24 | 22 | 53.54 |
| Al-Ain | 2 June 2019 | 21 December 2019 | 17 | 9 | 5 | 3 | 52.94 |
| Antwerp | 20 May 2020 | 29 December 2020 | 26 | 14 | 4 | 8 | 53.85 |
| Shanghai Port | 1 January 2021 | 1 December 2022 | 58 | 32 | 12 | 14 | 55.17 |
| Hajduk Split | 31 December 2022 | 23 October 2023 | 37 | 22 | 4 | 11 | 59.46 |
| Standard Liège | 4 January 2024 | 30 June 2025 | 62 | 14 | 23 | 25 | 22.58 |
| Gent | 1 July 2025 | 8 December 2025 | 19 | 8 | 5 | 6 | 42.11 |
| Club Brugge | 8 December 2025 | present | 46 | 34 | 5 | 7 | 73.91 |
| Total | | | 438 | 216 | 97 | 125 | 49.32 |

== Honours ==
=== Player ===
Hajduk Split

- Prva HNL: 2000–01, 2004–05
- Croatian Cup: 1999–2000

Málaga

- UEFA Intertoto Cup: 2002

Club Brugge

- Belgian Cup: 2006–07
- Belgian Supercup: 2005

Lokeren

- Belgian Cup: 2011–12

=== Manager ===
Club Brugge

- Jupiler Pro League: 2017–18, 2025–26
- Belgian Super Cup: 2018

Antwerp

- Belgian Cup: 2019–20

Hajduk Split

- Croatian Cup: 2022–23

Individual

- Professional Manager of the Year: 2017–18
