= Mate Baturina =

Croatian footballer

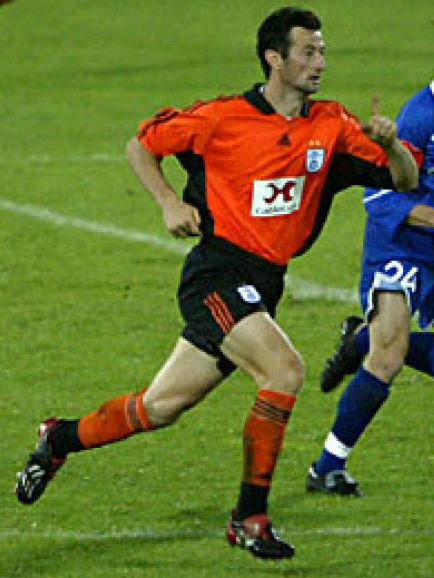
- Baturina with Grasshoppers

Personal information
- Date of birth: 1 August 1973 (age 53)
- Place of birth: Split, SR Croatia, Yugoslavia
- Height: 1.78 m (5 ft 10 in)
- Position: Attacking midfielder

Senior career*
Years	Team	Apps	(Gls)
1992–1993	Solin		
1993–1996	Šibenik	79	(15)
1996–1998	NK Zagreb	56	(22)
1998–2000	Hajduk Split	40	(19)
2000–2001	NK Zagreb	15	(6)
2002–2003	Grasshoppers	59	(11)
2003–2007	Bnei Yehuda	107	(23)
2007	Zadar	14	(0)
2008	Solin	5	(0)
Total		374	(96)

International career
1994	Croatia U21	3	(0)
1999	Croatia	1	(0)
- * Club domestic league appearances and goals

Mate Baturina (born 1 August 1973) is a Croatian former professional footballer who played as an attacking midfielder.

== International career ==
Baturina made his debut for Croatia in a June 1999 Korea Cup match against Egypt, coming on as a late substitute for Davor Vugrinec. It remained his sole international appearance.

== Personal life ==
His sons Roko (b.2000) and Martin (b.2003) are also professional football players.
