= Jurica Vučko =

Croatian footballer and manager

Personal information
- Full name: Jurica Vučko
- Date of birth: 8 October 1976 (age 50)
- Place of birth: Split, SFR Yugoslavia
- Height: 1.84 m (6 ft 0 in)
- Position: Striker

Team information
- Current team: Hajduk Split (assistant)

Senior career*
Years	Team	Apps	(Gls)
1995–2000	Hajduk Split	104	(37)
2000–2002	Alavés	28	(2)
2002–2003	Salamanca	12	(3)
2003–2004	Alavés	30	(2)
2004–2006	Poli Ejido	35	(5)
2006–2007	Hajduk Split	8	(0)
2007–2008	Tianjin Teda	7	(2)
Total		224	(51)

International career
1998–2001	Croatia	4	(0)

Managerial career
- 2013–2015: Hajduk Split (assistant)
- 2015–2016: PAOK (assistant)
- 2020–: Hajduk Split (assistant)
- * Club domestic league appearances and goals

Jurica Vučko (born 8 October 1976) is a Croatian former professional footballer who currently serves as an assistant manager of Croatian club Hajduk Split.

== Club career ==
Vučko started his professional career with hometown's Hajduk Split, playing five seasons as an important first-team element. Subsequently, he moved to Spain, joining Deportivo Alavés after the Basque side's European exploits. Rarely used, he did net twice for the club, on 8 April 2001, in a 4–2 home triumph over Real Valladolid.

Staying in the country, Vučko spent a further four seasons playing in its second level, for UD Salamanca and Polideportivo Ejido (returning to Alavés in between), before returning to Hajduk in 2006. His return was short-lived however, as he transferred to Chinese League's Tianjin Teda F.C.

== International career ==
Vučko made his debut for the Croatia national football team in a 2000 UEFA European Football Championship qualifying match on 10 October 1998, against Malta. He received a further 3 caps, his final international was a June 2001 World Cup qualification match against San Marino.

== Personal life ==
He is an older brother of former Croatia international player Luka Vučko.

== Honours ==
=== Player ===
==== Club ====
Hajduk Split

- Croatian Cup: 1999–2000
