= Eternal derby (Croatia) =

Football derby

Eternal derby Croatian derby
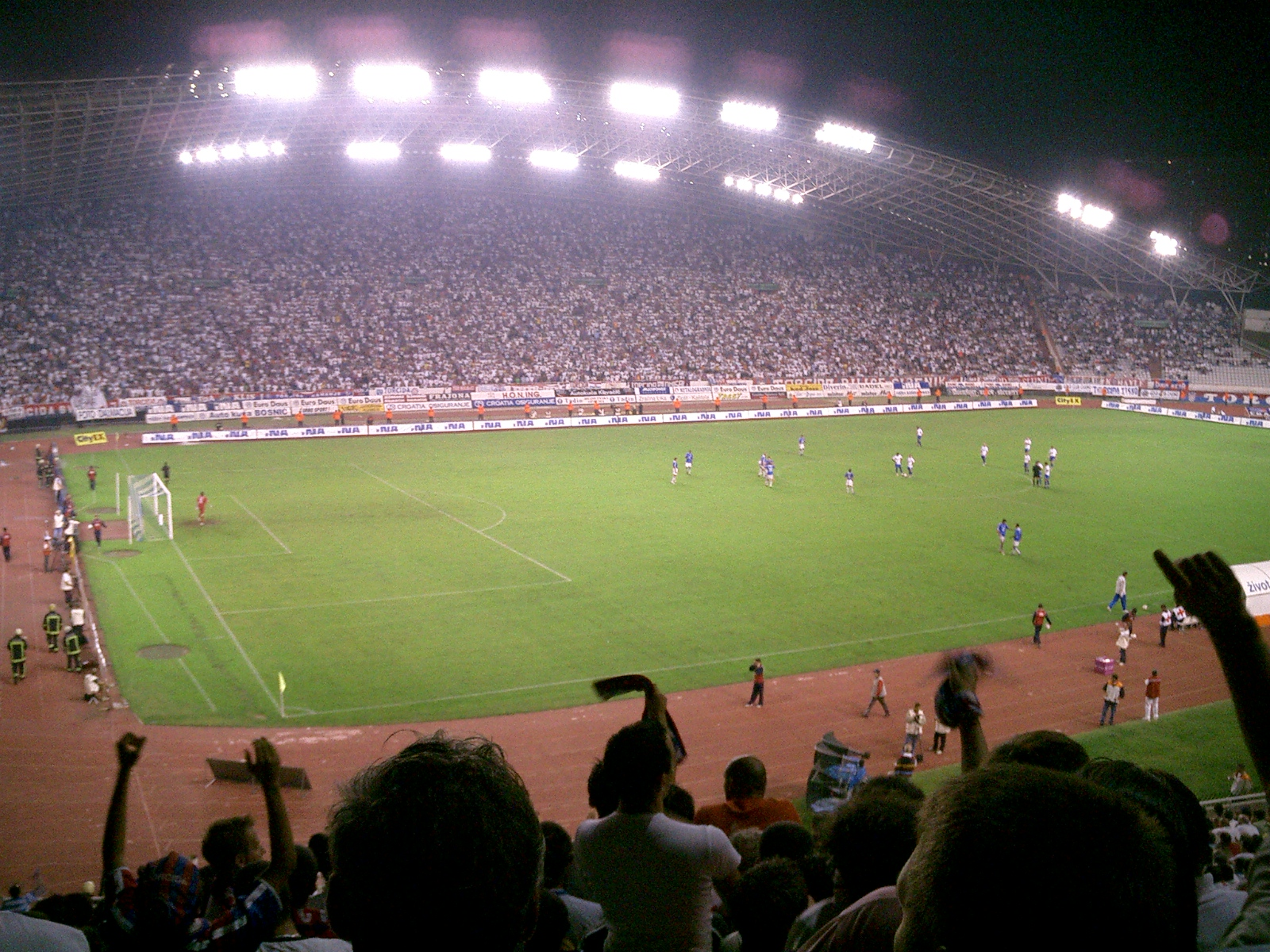
- Eternal Derby at Stadion Poljud in 2006
- Other names: Vječni derbi Hrvatski derbi
- Location: Croatia (Zagreb and Split)
- Teams: Dinamo Zagreb; Hajduk Split
- First meeting: 26 May 1946
- Latest meeting: Hajduk Split 2–1 Dinamo Zagreb (2026–27 HNL) (10 October 2026)

Statistics
- Total meetings: 251 official matches (207 league)
- Most wins: Dinamo Zagreb (109)
- Top scorer: Slaven Zambata (12)
- Largest victory: Dinamo Zagreb 0–6 Hajduk Split; 1954–55 Yugoslav First League (3 April 1955)

Eternal Derby (Croatian: Vječni derbi) also known as the Croatian Derby (Hrvatski derbi), is the name given to matches between the two biggest and most popular Croatian football clubs Dinamo Zagreb and Hajduk Split.

The rivalry can be traced back to 1920s when Zagreb's Građanski and Hajduk often clashed in the Kingdom of Yugoslavia championships. After World War II, Građanski was disbanded by the authorities, and Dinamo Zagreb was formed to take its place, retaining its colours. The two clubs soon became part of the "Big Four" of Yugoslav football (the other two being Red Star Belgrade and Partizan Belgrade from Serbia) ever since the Yugoslav championship was established in 1946 (both clubs spent their entire existence playing top-flight football). This lasted until 1991, when Croatia declared independence so clubs started competing in the Prva HNL, which saw its first season being played in 1992. Since 1992 Dinamo and Hajduk won 32 out of 35 Croatian championship titles, as well as 26 out of 35 Croatian Cups, which makes them by far the most successful clubs in Croatia.

Due to various formats that were used in the Croatian championship (which currently employs a four-round robin format) and the cup competition format (which has teams playing one-legged fixtures even in the final game) and in addition to the games played in the Supercup, there can be anywhere from four to six derbies per season. Since the first official match in 1946, there have been over 200 official derbies played in total.

== Supporters ==
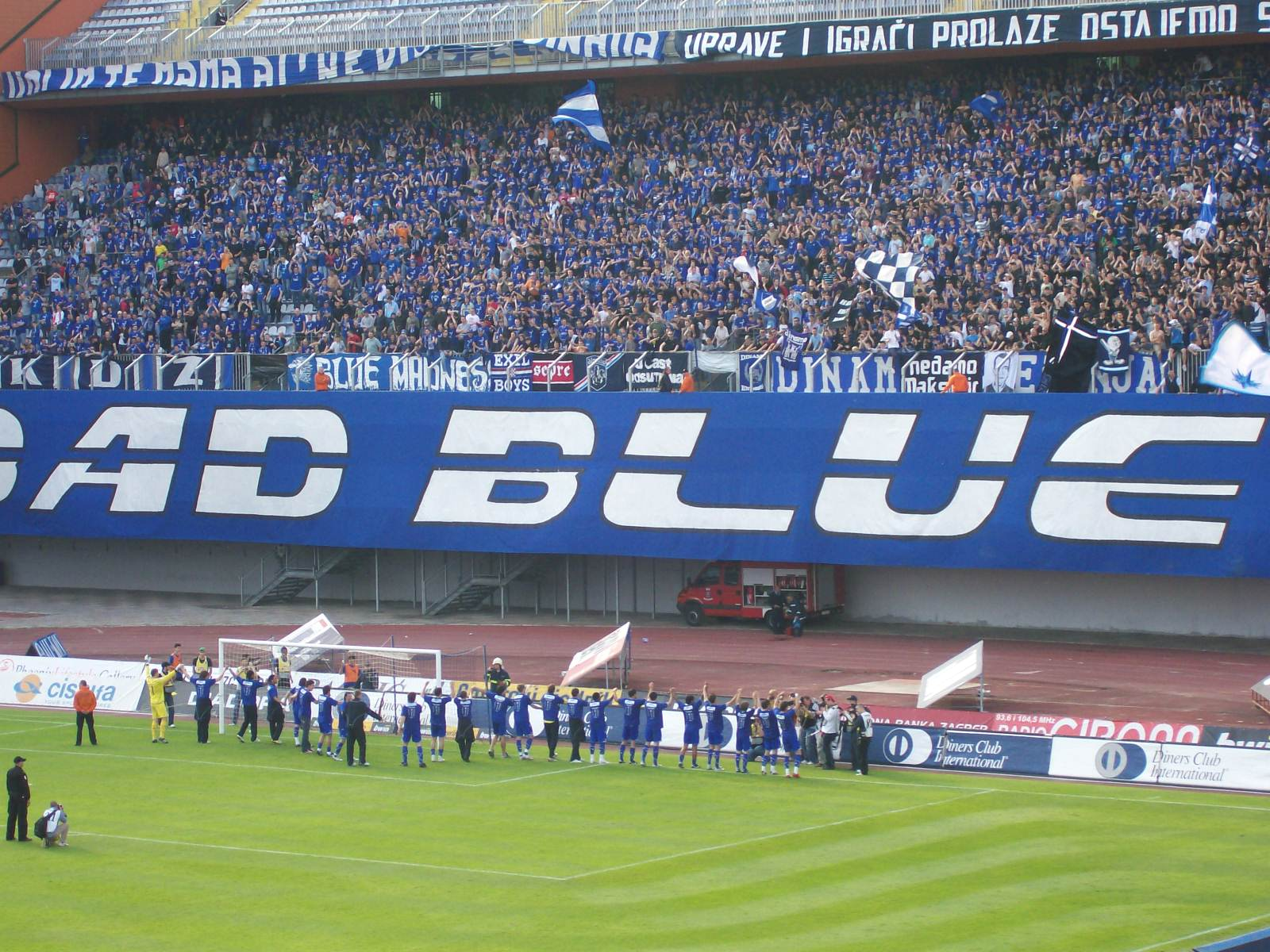
Dinamo Zagreb fans traditionally occupy the northern stands of Maksimir

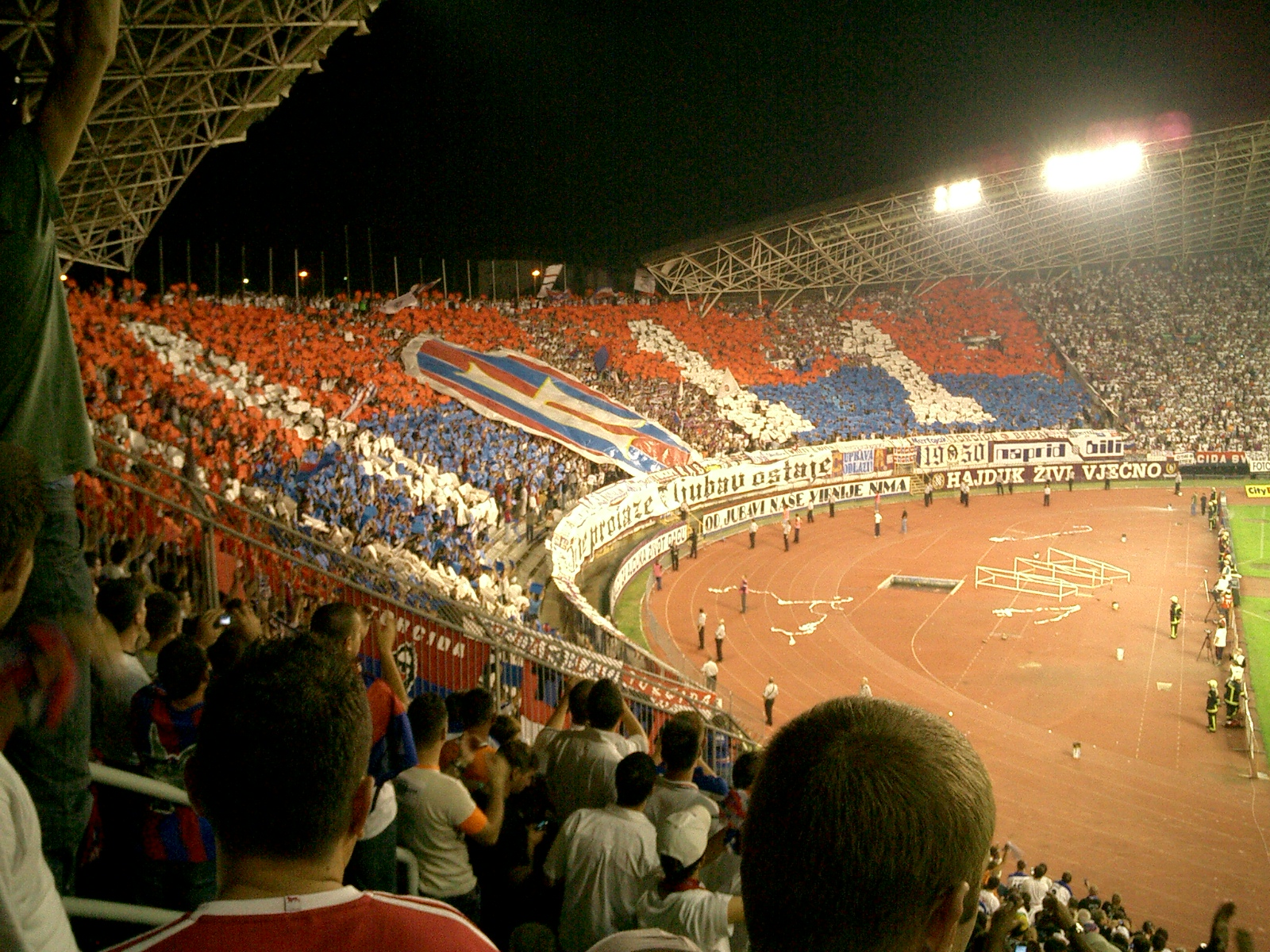
Hajduk Split fans traditionally occupy the northern stands of Poljud, southern of Maksimir

=== Bad Blue Boys ===
Bad Blue Boys (BBB) were founded on 17 March 1986 in Zagreb (Croatia), with members from different areas of Zagreb. The name of the group is said to have been inspired by the 1983 film starring Sean Penn, Bad Boys. They are considered one of the most dangerous supporters' groups in the world and are known for their vocal and physical intimidation at football matches. In 2011, Bad Blue Boys were mentioned in the list of 16 "hardcore hooligan firms, ultras groups we wouldn't want to mess with", compiled by the American sports website Bleacher Report. The group's mascot is a bulldog and the official anthem is "Dinamo ja volim" ("I love Dinamo"), by the Croatian pop rock band Pips, Chips & Videoclips. BBB also publish a fanzine about the club and the ultras subculture. The original fanzine was Ajmo plavi (Go Blues) which was replaced in 2006 by Dinamov sjever (Dinamo's North). At home matches in Dinamo Zagreb's Maksimir Stadium, the Bad Blue Boys usually settle behind the home goal on the stadium's north stand. Dinamo's fans are often unmannerly referred to as "purgeri" (a colloquial moniker for a citizen of Zagreb, originating from German bürger) by members of Torcida Split.

=== Torcida ===
Torcida Split or simply Torcida is the Hajduk Split supporters' group. Founded on 28 October 1950, it's known as the oldest supporters' groups in Europe. The name of the group comes from torcida, the Brazilian Portuguese word for "supporters". The group as a whole traditionally maintains good relations with the Portuguese Sport Lisboa e Benfica football club supporters No Name Boys. Torcida members gather in the north stand at the stadium of Poljud. Hajduk's fans are often unmannerly referred to as "tovari" (English: donkeys, similar to magarac) by Bad Blue Boys members, as the said animal is the supporters' group official mascot.

== Results ==
All statistics correct as of 10 October 2026.

Competition	Played	Dinamo wins	Draws	Hajduk wins	Dinamo goals	Hajduk goals
Yugoslav championship (1946–1991)
League	92	33	26	33	125	127
Yugoslav Cup	11	6	2	3	19	11
Yugoslavia totals	103	39	28	36	144	138
Croatian championship (1992–present)
Prva HNL	116	53	30	33	163	115
Croatian Cup	22	13	3	6	33	18
Supercup	10	4	4	2	12	8
Croatia totals	148	70	37	41	208	141
All Time	251	109	65	77	352	279

=== Key ===
Match ended in a draw
Dinamo win
Hajduk win

=== 1946–1991 ===
#	Date	Competition	Ground	Score	Dinamo Scorers	Hajduk Scorers
1	26 May 1946	Div 1	Koturaška	2–4	Strugar, Wölfl	Mrčić (2), T. Radovniković, F. Matošić
2	3 Jul 1946	Div 1	Plinara	2–0		Viđak, V. Andrijašević
3	8 Sep 1946	Div 1	Koturaška	0–1		Lokošek
4	16 Mar 1947	Div 1	Plinara	2–1	Strnad	F. Matošić (2)
5	17 Sep 1947	Div 1	Koturaška	2–1	Wölfl, Strnad	Viđak
6	11 Apr 1948	Div 1	Plinara	0–2	Wölfl, Benko	
7	10 Oct 1948	Div 1	Plinara	1–2	Wölfl, Cimermančić	Luštica
8	25 May 1949	Div 1	Koturaška	1–1	Lampelj	F. Matošić
9	9 Apr 1950	Div 1	Maksimir	1–3	Wölfl	Viđak, F. Matošić, o.g.
10	15 Oct 1950	Div 1	Plinara	1–0		I. Radovniković
11	16 Dec 1950	Cup	Maksimir	2–1	Wölfl, Horvat	I. Radovniković
12	8 Apr 1951	Div 1	Maksimir	3–0	Senčar (2), Wölfl	
13	9 Sep 1951	Div 1	Plinara	3–1	Dvornić	Krstulović (2), Broketa
14	18 May 1952	Div 1	Plinara	1–1	Čajkovski	Krstulović
15	8 Jun 1952	Div 1	Maksimir	0–3		Broketa, Vukas, F. Matošić
16	23 Nov 1952	Div 1	Plinara	2–0		Broketa, F. Matošić
17	31 May 1953	Div 1	Maksimir	5–1	Čajkovski (2), Čonč, Dvornić, Benko	Broketa
18	11 Oct 1953	Div 1	Plinara	1–0		Senčar
19	4 Apr 1954	Div 1	Maksimir	3–1	Osojnak (2), Čajkovski	Vukas
20	27 Oct 1954	Div 1	Plinara	1–1	o.g.	Vidošević
21	3 Apr 1955	Div 1	Maksimir	0–6		Vukas (2), Vidošević (2), Rebac (2)
22	16 Nov 1955	Div 1	Plinara	1–1	Čajkovski	Vukas
23	9 May 1956	Div 1	Maksimir	1–0	Čonč	
24	22 Aug 1956	Div 1	Maksimir	1–2	Režek	Krstulović, Papec
25	24 Mar 1957	Div 1	Plinara	3–0		Vidošević, Vukas, Garov
26	25 Aug 1957	Div 1	Plinara	5–1	Prelčec	Vidošević (2), Rebac (2), Vičević
27	2 Mar 1958	Div 1	Maksimir	4–0	Benko (3), o.g.	
28	12 Oct 1958	Div 1	Maksimir	1–1	D. Jerković	Vidošević
29	12 Apr 1959	Div 1	Plinara	1–1	Gašpert	Vidošević
30	8 Nov 1959	Div 1	Maksimir	1–0	Matuš	
31	6 Mar 1960	Cup	Maksimir	2–1	D. Jerković, Zambata	Papec
32	29 May 1960	Div 1	Plinara	3–2	Lipošinović, Dugandžija	Papec (2), Garov
33	27 Nov 1960	Div 1	Maksimir	1–4	Čonč	Anković (3), Papec
34	18 Dec 1960	Cup	Plinara	1–0		Papec
35	21 May 1961	Div 1	Plinara	4–1	Haraminčić	Anković (2), M. Kovačić, Bego
36	12 Sep 1961	Div 1	Maksimir	2–3	D. Jerković, Šikić	Šenauer (2), Anković
37	18 Mar 1962	Div 1	Plinara	1–0		Bego
38	2 Dec 1962	Div 1	Plinara	1–4	D. Jerković, Zambata, Belin, Kobeščak	Vukas
39	26 May 1963	Cup	Stadion JNA	4–1	Zambata (3), Braun	Anković
40	2 Jun 1963	Div 1	Maksimir	0–1		Hlevnjak
41	13 Oct 1963	Div 1	Maksimir	3–0	Zambata (2), Perušić	
42	12 Apr 1964	Div 1	Plinara	1–1	Kobeščak	Anković
43	12 Nov 1964	Div 1	Maksimir	2–0	D. Jerković, Kobeščak	
44	2 May 1965	Div 1	Plinara	0–1	Rora	
45	12 Dec 1965	Div 1	Maksimir	1–1	Pavić	Nadoveza
46	27 Feb 1966	Cup	Plinara	0–0 (3–4 p)		
47	12 Jun 1966	Div 1	Plinara	0–1	Zambata	
48	23 Oct 1966	Div 1	Maksimir	1–1	Zambata	Obradov
49	21 May 1967	Div 1	Plinara	0–0		
50	3 Sep 1967	Div 1	Plinara	2–0		Mušović, Nadoveza
51	24 Mar 1968	Div 1	Maksimir	0–0		
52	20 Oct 1968	Div 1	Maksimir	2–2	Belin, Pirić	Pavlica (2)
53	11 May 1969	Div 1	Plinara	2–1	Belin	Mušović, Ristić
54	31 May 1969	Cup	Stadion JNA	3–3 (aet)	Gucmirtl, Zambata (2)	Pavlica, Bošković, Vardić
55	19 Jun 1969	Cup	Stadion JNA	3–0	Belin, Zambata, Vabec	
56	12 Oct 1969	Div 1	Maksimir	3–1	Novak, Ramljak, Miljković	Nadoveza
57	11 Mar 1970	Cup	Maksimir	1–0	Rora	
58	3 May 1970	Div 1	Plinara	0–1	Miljković	
59	20 Sep 1970	Div 1	Maksimir	0–1		J. Jerković
60	18 Apr 1971	Div 1	Plinara	3–1	Miljković	Pavlica (2), Lemešić
61	28 Nov 1971	Div 1	Maksimir	1–0	Crnić	
62	17 May 1972	Cup	Stadion JNA	1–2	Senzen	Jovanić, Šurjak
63	4 Jun 1972	Div 1	Plinara	1–5	S. Kovačić (2), Novak, Gucmirtl, Mujkić	Nadoveza
64	10 Dec 1972	Div 1	Maksimir	1–0	Kafka	
65	17 Jun 1973	Div 1	Plinara	1–1	Kuže	Nadoveza
66	26 Aug 1973	Div 1	Plinara	2–3	Ramljak, Huljić, Vabec	J. Jerković (2)
67	3 Mar 1974	Div 1	Maksimir	0–1		J. Jerković
68	28 Aug 1974	Div 1	Maksimir	1–2	Tukša	Oblak (2)
69	16 Mar 1975	Div 1	Plinara	0–0		
70	7 Sep 1975	Div 1	Maksimir	0–1		o.g.
71	28 Mar 1976	Div 1	Plinara	2–1	Vabec	Mijač, Žungul
72	25 May 1976	Cup	Marakana	0–1 (aet)		Šurjak
73	11 Sep 1976	Div 1	Plinara	3–0		Žungul (3)
74	3 Apr 1977	Div 1	Maksimir	2–1	Cerin, Bedi	Đorđević
75	14 Aug 1977	Div 1	Plinara	2–1	Bonić	Rukljač, Luketin
76	7 Dec 1977	Div 1	Maksimir	0–0		
77	14 Oct 1978	Div 1	Maksimir	2–2	Z. Kranjčar, Džoni	Žungul, Đorđević
78	9 May 1979	Div 1	Plinara	1–2	Z. Kranjčar, Vabec	Primorac
79	5 Sep 1979	Div 1	Plinara	1–1	Ćalasan	Krstičević
80	11 May 1980	Div 1	Maksimir	1–0	Deverić	
81	21 Sep 1980	Div 1	Maksimir	2–1	Z. Kranjčar, Dumbović	Zl. Vujović
82	5 Apr 1981	Div 1	Poljud	3–1	Kovačević	Zo. Vujović, Z. Vulić, Šalov
83	9 Aug 1981	Div 1	Maksimir	0–0		
84	28 Feb 1982	Div 1	Poljud	1–2	Zajec, Deverić	Zo. Vujović
85	30 Oct 1982	Div 1	Poljud	2–2	Cerin, Deverić	Pešić, Gudelj
86	29 May 1983	Div 1	Maksimir	1–1	Cerin	Zo. Vujović
87	4 Dec 1983	Div 1	Poljud	1–1	Mlinarić	Jerolimov
88	30 May 1984	Div 1	Maksimir	3–1	B. Cvetković (2), Cerin	S. Andrijašević
89	9 Dec 1984	Div 1	Maksimir	2–2	Mlinarić (2)	Slišković (2)
90	13 Mar 1985	Cup	Maksimir	3–1	Jurić, B. Cvetković, Bogdan	Z. Vulić
91	30 Jun 1985	Div 1	Poljud	2–4	Bogdan (2), Mlinarić, I. Cvjetković	Adamović, Asanović
92	25 Aug 1985	Div 1	Poljud	1–0		Zl. Vujović
93	23 Mar 1986	Div 1	Maksimir	1–1	B. Cvetković	Zl. Vujović
94	17 Aug 1986	Div 1	Poljud	0–4	I. Cvjetković, Munjaković, Bogdanović, Matić	
95	1 Mar 1987	Div 1	Maksimir	3–3	Besek, Malbaša, Munjaković	Deverić, Z. Vulić, Asanović
96	27 Sep 1987	Div 1	Poljud	0–2	Bogdanović, Mlinarić	
97	20 Apr 1988	Div 1	Maksimir	1–1	Kasalo	Bokšić
98	10 Sep 1988	Div 1	Poljud	4–1	Dimitrijević	Bokšić, Karačić, Jarni, Tipurić
99	2 Apr 1989	Div 1	Maksimir	1–0	Panadić	
100	17 Sep 1989	Div 1	Maksimir	2–0	Shala, Boban	
101	18 Mar 1990	Div 1	Poljud	2–3	Boban, Šuker, Shala	Vučević, Asanović
102	13 Oct 1990	Div 1	Maksimir	1–1 (4–3 p)	Šuker	Štimac
103	27 Apr 1991	Div 1	Poljud	1–2	Šuker (2)	Vučević

=== 1992–present ===
#	Date	Competition	Ground	Score	Dinamo Scorers	Hajduk Scorers	Attendance	Referee	Report
1	14 Mar 1992	1. HNL	Maksimir	1–2	Adžić	Miše, Kozniku	15,000	Beusan	HRnogomet.com
2	9 May 1992	1. HNL	Poljud	0–0			20,000	Vranarčić	HRnogomet.com
3	15 Nov 1992	1. HNL	Maksimir	1–1	Dž. Turković	T. Erceg	50,000	Matković	HRnogomet.com
4	19 May 1993	Cup	Poljud	4–1	Stanić	Kozniku (2), Jeličić, Novaković	45,000	Poljak	HRnogomet.com
5	30 May 1993	1. HNL	Poljud	2–1	Vlaović	Rapaić, Kozniku	30,000	Kulušić	HRnogomet.com
6	2 Jun 1993	Cup	Maksimir	2–1	Vlaović (2)	Kozniku	45,000	Beusan	HRnogomet.com
7	1 Aug 1993	Supercup	Maksimir	4–4	Vlaović (2), I. Cvitanović, Gašpar	Mornar (2), Računica, Pralija	30,000	Ant. Burilo	HRnogomet.com
8	7 Aug 1993	Supercup	Poljud	0–0			30,000	Matković	HRnogomet.com
9	18 Sep 1993	1. HNL	Poljud	4–2	Jeličić (2)	Hibić, Računica, Rapaić, Mornar	30,000	Kulušić	HRnogomet.com
10	27 Mar 1994	1. HNL	Maksimir	4–0	I. Cvitanović (2), Dž. Turković, Škrinjar		35,000	Matković	HRnogomet.com
11	24 Jul 1994	Supercup	Poljud	1–0		Mornar	30,000	Vranarčić	HRnogomet.com
12	31 Jul 1994	Supercup	Maksimir	1–0	I. Cvitanović		15,000	Širić	HRnogomet.com
13	27 Nov 1994	1. HNL	Maksimir	1–0	Lesjak		20,000	Matković	HRnogomet.com
14	17 May 1995	Cup	Poljud	3–2	I. Pamić, Jeličić	T. Erceg (2), Asanović	15,000	Širić	HRnogomet.com
15	24 May 1995	1. HNL	Poljud	3–1	Peternac	Pralija (2), Mornar	30,000	Vranarčić	HRnogomet.com
16	28 May 1995	Cup	Maksimir	0–1		Asanović	17,000	Vranarčić	HRnogomet.com
17	24 Sep 1995	1. HNL	Maksimir	1–0	Viduka		30,000	Vitković	HRnogomet.com
18	17 Dec 1995	1. HNL	Poljud	2–1	A. Petrović	Jurčec, Pralija	8,000	Širić	HRnogomet.com
19	24 Mar 1996	1. HNL	Maksimir	4–1	Gašpar, Mlinarić, Viduka, Mladinić	Asanović	40,000	Vitković	HRnogomet.com
20	28 Apr 1996	1. HNL	Poljud	3–2	I. Cvitanović, Mladinić	Rapaić, Pralija, Čeko	40,000	Beusan	Slobodna Dalmacija
21	22 Sep 1996	1. HNL	Maksimir	2–1	Marić (2)	I. Leko	30,000	Širić	HRnogomet.com
22	13 Apr 1997	1. HNL	Poljud	1–2	I. Cvitanović, Marić	T. Erceg	25,000	Vranarčić	HRnogomet.com
23	22 Aug 1997	1. HNL	Poljud	1–0		Vučko	30,000	Vitković	HRnogomet.com
24	18 Feb 1998	1. HNL	Maksimir	2–0	Šokota, Krznar		25,000	Sinovčić	HRnogomet.com
25	29 Mar 1998	1. HNL	Maksimir	2–1	Viduka (2)	Mladenović	18,000	Vitković	HRnogomet.com
26	26 Apr 1998	1. HNL	Poljud	1–1	Mujčin	Skoko	20,000	Novak	HRnogomet.com
27	30 Oct 1998	1. HNL	Poljud	1–1	Viduka	I. Leko	30,000	Širić	HRnogomet.com
28	21 Mar 1999	1. HNL	Maksimir	1–0	M. Cvitanović		25,000	Sinovčić	HRnogomet.com
29	25 Apr 1999	1. HNL	Poljud	1–0		T. Erceg	30,000	Malovac	HRnogomet.com
30	19 May 1999	1. HNL	Maksimir	1–1	J. Šimić	H. Vuković	18,000	Novak	HRnogomet.com
31	23 Oct 1999	1. HNL	Poljud	1–1	Šokota	Lalić	30,000	Katuša	HRnogomet.com
32	11 Mar 2000	1. HNL	Maksimir	0–0			30,000	Kurtović	SD.hr
33	2 May 2000	Cup	Poljud	2–0^{1}		Vučko (2)	18,000	Kovačić	SD.hr
34	13 May 2000	1. HNL	Maksimir	3–1	Bišćan, Sedloski, Šokota	Deranja	18,000	Katuša	SD.hr
35	16 May 2000	Cup	Maksimir	1–0	I. Cvitanović		20,000	Širić	SD.hr
36	19 Sep 2000	1. HNL	Poljud	0–1	Balaban		17,000	Novak	SD.hr
37	3 Dec 2000	1. HNL	Maksimir	3–2	Balaban, Šokota, Gondžić	Deranja, Miladin	15,000	Širić	SD.hr
38	14 Apr 2001	1. HNL	Poljud	3–1	Sedloski	Bubalo (2), Musa	32,000	Novak	SD.hr
39	9 May 2001	Cup	Poljud	0–2	Šokota, Mikić		30,000	Kovačić	SD.hr
40	13 May 2001	1. HNL	Maksimir	1–0	I. Cvitanović		25,000	Kovačić	SD.hr
41	23 May 2001	Cup	Maksimir	1–0	Pilipović		13,000	Širić	SD.hr
42	14 Oct 2001	1. HNL	Maksimir	1–2	Smoje	Štimac, Cesar (o.g.)	15,000	Kovačić	SD.hr
43	7 Apr 2002	1. HNL	Poljud	2–1	Zahora	Andrić, T. Erceg	20,000	Širić	SD.hr
44	1 Sep 2002	1. HNL	Poljud	1–0		Đolonga	35,000	Širić	SD.hr
45	1 Dec 2002	1. HNL	Maksimir	2–1	Smoje, Vejić (o.g.)	Krpan	18,000	Širić	SD.hr
46	13 Apr 2003	1. HNL	Maksimir	0–1		Rapaić	20,000	Širić	SD.hr
47	11 May 2003	1. HNL	Poljud	4–1	Marić	Računica (2), Andrić, Đolonga	22,000	Širić	SD.hr
48	20 Jul 2003	Supercup	Maksimir	4–1	Tomić, Sedloski, Eduardo, Zahora	T. Rukavina	7,000	Bebek	SD.hr
49	31 Aug 2003	1. HNL	Maksimir	1–0	Mitu		8,000	Kovačić	SD.hr
50	6 Dec 2003	1. HNL	Poljud	3–1	N. Kranjčar	Računica, Krpan, Andrić	15,000	Bebek	SD.hr
51	3 Apr 2004	1. HNL	Poljud	0–0			25,000	Svilokos	SD.hr
52	1 May 2004	1. HNL	Maksimir	3–1	Strupar (2), Zahora	Pralija	20,000	Kovačić	SD.hr
53	17 Jul 2004	Supercup	Poljud	1–0		Blatnjak	17,000	Bebek	Sportnet.hr
54	11 Sep 2004	1. HNL	Maksimir	3–0	Eduardo, Zahora, Karić		15,000	Novak	Sportnet.hr
55	5 Dec 2004	1. HNL	Poljud	1–0		Bušić	25,000	Svilokos	Sportnet.hr
56	11 Sep 2005	1. HNL	Maksimir	0–0			35,000	Širić	Sportnet.hr
57	12 Feb 2006	1. HNL	Poljud	0–1	Modrić		20,000	Svilokos	Sportnet.hr
58	15 Apr 2006	1. HNL	Poljud	1–0		Cimirotič	10,000	Kovačić	Sportnet.hr
59	13 May 2006	1. HNL	Maksimir	1–0	Modrić		30,000	Širić	Sportnet.hr
60	1 Oct 2006	1. HNL	Poljud	2–2	Eduardo, Vugrinec	Carević, Munhoz	35,000	Kovačić	Sportnet.hr
61	24 Feb 2007	1. HNL	Maksimir	2–1	Eduardo (2)	Bartolović	30,000	Svilokos	Sportnet.hr
62	14 Mar 2007	Cup	Maksimir	1–0	Vugrinec		15,000	Bebek	Sportnet.hr
63	4 Apr 2007	Cup	Poljud	2–2	Modrić, Tadić	Damjanović, Bartolović	25,000	Svilokos	Sportnet.hr
64	19 May 2007	1. HNL	Maksimir	3–0	Eduardo (3)		35,000	Bebek	Sportnet.hr
65	7 Oct 2007	1. HNL	Poljud	1–2	Modrić, Mandžukić	Kalinić	18,000	Bebek	Sportnet.hr
66	8 Mar 2008	1. HNL	Maksimir	1–0	Vrdoljak		13,500	Bebek	Sportnet.hr
67	3 May 2008	1. HNL	Poljud	1–1	Etto	A. Rukavina	10,000	Vučemilović	Sportnet.hr
68	7 May 2008	Cup	Maksimir	3–0	Mandžukić (2), Tadić		15,000	Ljubičić	Sportnet.hr
69	14 May 2008	Cup	Poljud	0–0			6,000	Bebek	Sportnet.hr
70	21 Sep 2008	1. HNL	Maksimir	0–2		Gabrić, Ibričić	8,000	Svilokos	Sportnet.hr
71	22 Feb 2009	1. HNL	Poljud	2–0		Kalinić, Ibričić	38,000	Bebek	Sportnet.hr
72	13 May 2009	Cup	Maksimir	3–0	Mandžukić (2), Sammir		20,000	Marić	Sportnet.hr
73	28 May 2009	Cup	Poljud	3–0 (3–4 p)		Kalinić (2), Bartolović	18,000	Ljubičić	Sportnet.hr
74	31 May 2009	1. HNL	Poljud	2–2	Chago, Mandžukić	Ibričić, Vukušić	10,000	And. Burilo	Sportnet.hr
75	31 Oct 2009	1. HNL	Poljud	2–1	Sivonjić	Lovren (o.g.), Strinić	4,000	Batinić	Sportnet.hr
76	24 Mar 2010	Cup	Maksimir	0–0			13,000	Križarić	Sportnet.hr
77	7 Apr 2010	Cup	Poljud	1–0		Ibričić	30,000	And. Burilo	Sportnet.hr
78	1 May 2010	1. HNL	Maksimir	0–0			13,000	Svilokos	Sportnet.hr
79	17 Jul 2010	Supercup	Maksimir	1–0	Bišćan		8,000	Kovačić	Sportnet.hr
80	11 Sep 2010	1. HNL	Poljud	1–1	Sammir	An. Sharbini	30,000	And. Burilo	Sportnet.hr
81	19 Mar 2011	1. HNL	Maksimir	2–0	Badelj, Bećiraj		15,000	And. Burilo	Sportnet.hr
82	10 Sep 2011	1. HNL	Poljud	1–1	Ibáñez	Andrić	33,000	Bebek	Sportnet.hr
83	17 Mar 2012	1. HNL	Maksimir	2–1	Krstanović (2)	Vukušić	18,000	Bebek	Sportnet.hr
84	29 Sep 2012	1. HNL	Maksimir	3–1	Sammir (2), Čop	Caktaš	11,000	Svilokos	Sportnet.hr
85	27 Feb 2013	1. HNL	Poljud	1–2	Krstanović, Ibáñez	Jozinović	25,000	Bebek	Sportnet.hr
86	26 May 2013	1. HNL	Maksimir	3–1	Z. Pamić, A. Rukavina, Brozović	Z. Pamić (o.g.)	8,297	Vučkov	Sportnet.hr
87	6 Jul 2013	Supercup	Maksimir	1–1 (4–1 p)	Čop	Caktaš	12,000	Vučemilović	Sportnet.hr
88	14 Sep 2013	1. HNL	Poljud	2–0		Pašalić (2)	30,000	Pejin	Sportnet.hr
89	1 Dec 2013	1. HNL	Maksimir	2–2	Soudani, Čop	Kouassi, Maglica	12,000	Ljubičić	Sportnet.hr
90	4 Dec 2013	Cup	Maksimir	5–0	Šimunić, Čop (2), Fernandes, Halilović		4,000	Pejin	Sportnet.hr
91	18 Dec 2013	Cup	Poljud	1–2	Ademi, Antolić	Bradarić	10,000	Bebek	Sportnet.hr
92	22 Mar 2014	1. HNL	Poljud	0–2	Čop, Halilović		25,000	Ljubičić	Sportnet.hr
93	17 May 2014	1. HNL	Maksimir	3–0 (1–0)^{2}	J. Leko		5,000	Bebek	Sportnet.hr
94	31 Aug 2014	1. HNL	Poljud	2–3	Čop (2), Henriquez	Sušić, Milić	16,072	Bebek	Sportnet.hr
95	22 Nov 2014	1. HNL	Maksimir	3–0^{3}					
96	14 Mar 2015	1. HNL	Poljud	1–1	Machado	Balić	20,000	Vučemilović	Sportnet.hr
97	16 May 2015	1. HNL	Maksimir	4–0	Ćorić, Henriquez (3)		14,372	Vučkov	Sportnet.hr
98	12 Jul 2015	1. HNL	Maksimir	1–1	Soudani	Caktaš	23,631	Marić	hnl.hr
99	19 Sep 2015	1. HNL	Poljud	0–0			17,939	Marić	hnl.hr
100	5 Dec 2015	1. HNL	Maksimir	2–1	Fernandes, Soudani	Caktaš	10,328	Vučemilović	prvahnl.hr
101	16 Mar 2016	Cup	Poljud	0–2	Soudani, Ćorić		12,973	Batinić	hns-cff.hr
102	20 Mar 2016	1. HNL	Poljud	1–0		Tudor	12,726	Vučemilović	hnl.hr
103	6 Apr 2016	Cup	Maksimir	4–0	Brekalo, Fernandes (2), Soudani		7,923	Bebek	hns-cff.hr
104	10 Aug 2016	1. HNL	Poljud	0–4	Rog (2), Fernandes (2)		29,109	Zebec	hnl.hr
105	2 Oct 2016	1. HNL	Maksimir	0–0			11,500	Bebek	hnl.hr
106	17 Dec 2016	1. HNL	Poljud	0–1	Soudani		14,031	Zebec	hnl.hr
107	22 Apr 2017	1. HNL	Maksimir	0–2		A. Erceg, Futács	13,392	Vučemilović	hnl.hr
108	6 Aug 2017	1. HNL	Maksimir	3–1	Ćorić, Olmo, Soudani	Nižić	11,936	Zebec	hnl.hr
109	21 Oct 2017	1. HNL	Poljud	2–2	Benković, Henriquez	A. Erceg (2)	24,736	Pejin	hnl.hr
110	18 Feb 2018	1. HNL	Maksimir	0–1		Ohandza	13,500	Pejin	hnl.hr
111	22 Apr 2018	1. HNL	Poljud	1–2	Gavranović (2)	Caktaš	31,751	Zebec	hnl.hr
112	23 May 2018	Cup	Cibalia	1–0	Gavranović		8,208	Zebec	hns-cff.hr
113	29 Sep 2018	1. HNL	Poljud	0–0			21,472	Bebek	hnl.hr
114	16 Dec 2018	1. HNL	Maksimir	1–0	Kadzior		11,064	Bebek	hnl.hr
115	3 Apr 2019	1. HNL	Poljud	0–1	Gavranović		26,664	Batinić	hnl.hr
116	25 May 2019	1. HNL	Maksimir	3–1	Hajrović, Gavranović (2)	Caktaš	15,433	Bebek	hnl.hr
117	31 Aug 2019	1. HNL	Poljud	1–0		Jradi	29,359	Batinić	hnl.hr
118	22 Nov 2019	1. HNL	Maksimir	1–1	Ismajli (o.g.)	Caktaš	15,757	Bebek	hnl.hr
119	4 Mar 2020	1. HNL	Poljud	0–2	Kądzior, Ademi		22,436	Bebek	hnl.hr
120	12 Jul 2020	1. HNL	Maksimir	2–3	Ivanušec, Oršić	Čuić (2), Théophile-Catherine (o.g.)	1,967	Bebek	hnl.hr
121	12 Sep 2020	1. HNL	Poljud	1–2	Kastrati, Oršić	Jurić	0	Bebek	hnl.hr
122	27 Jan 2021	1. HNL	Maksimir	3–1	Oršić (2), Majer	Vušković	0	Zebec	hnl.hr
123	25 Apr 2021	1. HNL	Maksimir	2–0	Petković, Kastrati		0	Bebek	hnl.hr
124	5 May 2021	1. HNL	Poljud	1–1	Majer	Livaja	0	Pajač	hnl.hr
125	5 Dec 2021	1. HNL	Maksimir	0–2		Livaja, Sahiti	9,914	Lovrić	hnl.hr
126	12 Mar 2022	1. HNL	Poljud	0–0			30,129	Bel	hnl.hr
127	20 Apr 2022	1. HNL	Poljud	1–0		Kalinić	30,038	Pajač	hnl.hr
128	21 May 2022	1. HNL	Maksimir	3–1	Petković, Oršić, Baturina	Livaja	18,353	Kolarić	hnl.hr
129	9 Jul 2022	Supercup	Maksimir	0–0 (4–1 p)			16,532	Pajač	Sportnet.hr
130	13 Aug 2022	HNL	Maksimir	4–1	Baturina, Ademi, Gojak, Oršić	Atanasov	14,301	Bel	hnl.hr
131	21 Oct 2022	HNL	Poljud	1–1	Petković	Livaja	32,640	Pajač	hnl.hr
132	25 Feb 2023	HNL	Maksimir	4–0	Ademi, Baturina, Ivanušec (2)		14,010	Bel	hnl.hr
133	30 Apr 2023	HNL	Poljud	0–0			30,515	Bel	hnl.hr
134	15 Jul 2023	Supercup	Maksimir	1–0	Baturina		17,707	Bel	hns-cff.hr
135	21 Jul 2023	HNL	Maksimir	1–2	Petković	Livaja, Pukštas	12,428	Pajač	hnl.hr
136	1 Oct 2023	HNL	Poljud	1–0		Sahiti	33,824	Pajač	hnl.hr
137	17 Dec 2023	HNL	Maksimir	0–0			18,313	Kolarić	hnl.hr
138	30 Mar 2024	HNL	Poljud	0–1	Petković		31,018	Siebert	hnl.hr
139	3 Apr 2024	Cup	Poljud	0–1	Kulenović		27,634	Maresca	hns.family
140	13 Sep 2024	HNL	Maksimir	0–1		Livaja	20,984	Pajač	hnl.hr
141	1 Dec 2024	HNL	Poljud	1–0		Sigur	33,502	Kolarić	hnl.hr
142	2 Mar 2025	HNL	Maksimir	2–2	Baturina, Pierre-Gabriel	Franjić (o.g.), Krovinović	16,901	M. Erceg	hnl.hr
143	3 May 2025	HNL	Poljud	1–3	Pierre-Gabriel, Kulenović, Sučić	Livaja	32,111	M. Erceg	hnl.hr
144	20 Sep 2025	HNL	Poljud	0–2	Hoxha, Bakrar		32,212	M. Erceg	hnl.hr
145	6 Dec 2025	HNL	Maksimir	1–1	Hoxha	Šego	17,028	Kolarić	hnl.hr
146	8 Mar 2026	HNL	Poljud	1–3	Zajc, Vidović, Bakrar	Pukštas	31,030	M. Erceg	hnl.hr
147	9 May 2026	HNL	Maksimir	2–0	Bakrar, Beljo		21,942	Pavlešić	hnl.hr
148	10 Oct 2026	HNL	Poljud	2–1	Beljo	McKenna (o.g.), Sanyang	24,974	Pajač	hnl.hr
149	20 Dec 2026	HNL	Maksimir						
150	20 Mar 2027	HNL	Poljud						
151	22 May 2027	HNL	Maksimir						

Note: Home team's score always shown first

^{1} Match abandoned after 86 minutes due to mass fight between both clubs' supporters and the police.

^{2} Match abandoned after 85 minutes due to crowd trouble.

^{3} Match was postponed and later abandoned following Hajduk Split's players reluctance to enter the stadium. On 25 November 2014, Croatian Football Federation awarded Dinamo Zagreb a 3–0 win, deeming Hajduk Split's players move as "unjustified".

== Records ==
=== Players who have played for both teams ===
- Ratko Kacian (as player: Hajduk Split 1939–1941 / Dinamo Zagreb 1945–1949)
- Branko Stinčić (as player: Hajduk Split 1946–1948 / Dinamo Zagreb 1950–1953)
- Božidar Senčar (as player: Dinamo Zagreb 1946–1947, 1951–1952 / Hajduk Split 1952–1954)
- Svemir Delić (as player: Dinamo Zagreb 1949–1952 / Hajduk Split 1952–1954)
- Hrvoje Jukić (as player: Hajduk Split 1956–1957 / Dinamo Zagreb 1966–1968)
- Vilson Džoni (as player: Hajduk Split 1968–1978 / Dinamo Zagreb 1978–1979)
- Damir Maričić (as player: Hajduk Split 1976–1977, 1978–1981 / Dinamo Zagreb 1983–1984)
- Stjepan Deverić (as player: Dinamo Zagreb 1979–1984, 1987–1991 / Hajduk Split 1984–1987)
- Dražen Boban (as player: Dinamo Zagreb 1985–1988, 1989–1990, 1994–1995 / Hajduk Split 1988–1989)
- Vlado Papić (as player: Hajduk Split 1986–1988 / Dinamo Zagreb 1988–1989)
- Saša Peršon (as player: Dinamo Zagreb 1990–1992 / Hajduk Split 1992–1995)
- Željko Šoić (as player: Dinamo Zagreb 1991–1993 / Hajduk Split 1993)
- Mario Novaković (as player: Hajduk Split 1988–1990, 1991–1993 / Dinamo Zagreb 1993–1995)
- Joško Jeličić (as player: Hajduk Split 1987–1993 / Dinamo Zagreb 1993–1995, 1997–2001)
- Srđan Mladinić (as player: Hajduk Split 1993–1994 / Dinamo Zagreb 1995–1998)
- Renato Jurčec (as player: Hajduk Split 1994–1996 / Dinamo Zagreb 1996–1998)
- Mladen Mladenović (as player: Dinamo Zagreb 1989–1991 / Hajduk Split 1997–1998)
- Ardian Kozniku (as player: Hajduk Split 1990–1994 / Dinamo Zagreb 1998–2000)
- Goce Sedloski (as player: Hajduk Split 1996–1998 / Dinamo Zagreb 1998–2005)
- Mario Bazina (as player: Hajduk Split 1992–1995 / Dinamo Zagreb 1999–2001)
- Tomislav Rukavina (as player: Dinamo Zagreb 1995–1999 / Hajduk Split 2003–2005)
- Ivan Bošnjak (as player: Hajduk Split 2000–2002 / Dinamo Zagreb 2003–2006)
- Mate Dragičević (as player: Dinamo Zagreb 2002–2004 / Hajduk Split 2004–2006)
- Niko Kranjčar (as player: Dinamo Zagreb 2001–2004 / Hajduk Split 2005–2006)
- Danijel Hrman (as player: Dinamo Zagreb 2004 / Hajduk Split 2005–2006)
- Mario Grgurović (as player: Hajduk Split 2003–2006 / Dinamo Zagreb 2006)
- Mladen Bartolović (as player: Dinamo Zagreb 2003–2004 / Hajduk Split 2006–2009)
- Mirko Hrgović (as player: Hajduk Split 2006–2008 / Dinamo Zagreb 2008–2009)
- Dario Jertec (as player: Dinamo Zagreb 2007–2008 / Hajduk Split 2008–2010)
- Marijan Buljat (as player: Dinamo Zagreb 2004–2008 / Hajduk Split 2008–2012)
- Ivo Smoje (as player: Dinamo Zagreb 2001–2002 / Hajduk Split 2009–2010)
- Ante Rukavina (as player: Hajduk Split 2007–2008 / Dinamo Zagreb 2010–2014)
- Duje Čop (as player: Hajduk Split 2009–2011 / Dinamo Zagreb 2012–2015, 2021–2022)
- Ruben Lima (as player: Hajduk Split 2011–2013 / Dinamo Zagreb 2013–2014)
- Franko Andrijašević (as player: Hajduk Split 2010–2014 / Dinamo Zagreb 2014–2016)
- Ivan Anton Vasilj (as player: Hajduk Split 2014–2015 / Dinamo Zagreb 2017–2018)
- Mario Budimir (as player: Hajduk Split 2004–2006 / Dinamo Zagreb 2018–2019)
- Dario Špikić (as player: Hajduk Split 2017–2020 / Dinamo Zagreb 2021–present)
- Josip Brekalo (as player: Dinamo Zagreb 2015–2016 / Hajduk Split 2024)
- Marko Brkljača (as player: Hajduk Split 2021–2022 / Dinamo Zagreb 2022–2025)
- Iker Almena (as player: Hajduk Split 2025–2026 / Dinamo Zagreb 2026–present)

=== Players who have played for one club in youth career and for rival club in senior career ===
- Stipe Lapić (youth career: Hajduk Split 1995–2001 / senior career: Dinamo Zagreb 2003–2004)
- Teo Kardum (youth career: Hajduk Split 2000–2003 / youth career: Dinamo Zagreb 2003–2004 / senior career: Dinamo Zagreb 2004–2006)
- Mladen Pelaić (youth career: Dinamo Zagreb 2000–2004 / senior career: Hajduk Split 2007–2010)
- Ivan Ćurjurić (youth career: Dinamo Zagreb 2006–2007 / youth career: Hajduk Split 2007–2008 / senior career: Hajduk Split 2008–2009)
- Mate Maleš (youth career: Hajduk Split 2007–2008 / senior career: Dinamo Zagreb 2008)
- Mario Maloča (youth career: Dinamo Zagreb 1998–2004 / youth career: Hajduk Split 2007–2008 / senior career: Hajduk Split 2008–2015)
- Ante Puljić (youth career: Hajduk Split 2005–2006 / senior career: Dinamo Zagreb 2011, 2012–2013)
- Filip Ozobić (youth career: Dinamo Zagreb 2006–2007 / senior career: Hajduk Split 2012–2013)
- Tomislav Kiš (youth career: Dinamo Zagreb 2005–2008 / youth career: Hajduk Split 2011–2012 / senior career: Hajduk Split 2012–2015)
- Josip Čalušić (youth career: Hajduk Split 2004–2005, 2007–2009 / youth career: Dinamo Zagreb 2010–2011 / senior career: Dinamo Zagreb 2013–2016)
- Ivan Prskalo (youth career: Dinamo Zagreb 2010–2012 / youth career: Hajduk Split 2012–2014 / senior career: Hajduk Split 2014–2016)
- Marko Pejić (youth career: Dinamo Zagreb 2007–2013 / senior career: Hajduk Split 2015–2016)
- Fran Tudor (youth career: Dinamo Zagreb 2005–2007 / senior career: Hajduk Split 2015–2019)
- David Čolina (youth career: Dinamo Zagreb 2009–2018 / senior career: Hajduk Split 2019–2023)
- Filip Krovinović (youth career: Dinamo Zagreb 2007–2009 / senior career: Hajduk Split 2021–present)
- Martin Baturina (youth career: Hajduk Split 2012–2015 / youth career: Dinamo Zagreb 2017–2021 / senior career: Dinamo Zagreb 2021–2025)
- Deni Jurić (youth career: Hajduk Split 2016–2018 / senior career: Dinamo Zagreb 2021–2024)
- Jakov-Anton Vasilj (youth career: Hajduk Split 2014–2017 / youth career: Dinamo Zagreb 2017–2021 / senior career: Dinamo Zagreb 2021–2022)

=== Players who have scored for both clubs in the derby ===
- Stjepan Deverić (4 goals, 3 for Dinamo Zagreb and 1 for Hajduk Split)
- Joško Jeličić (4 goals, 3 for Dinamo Zagreb and 1 for Hajduk Split)
- Ante Rukavina (2 goals, 1 for Dinamo Zagreb and 1 for Hajduk Split)
- Božidar Senčar (3 goals, 2 for Dinamo Zagreb and 1 for Hajduk Split)

=== Coaches who have managed both teams ===
- Branko Zebec (as manager: Dinamo Zagreb 1965–1967, 1984 / Hajduk Split 1972–1973)
- Vlatko Marković (as manager: Hajduk Split 1977–1978 / Dinamo Zagreb 1978–1988, 1983, 1990–1991, 1992)
- Tomislav Ivić (as manager: Hajduk Split 1968–1972, 1973–1976, 1978–1980 / Dinamo Zagreb 1986–1987)
- Josip Skoblar (as manager: Hajduk Split 1986–1987, 1990–1991 / Dinamo Zagreb 1988–1989)
- Nenad Gračan (as manager: Hajduk Split 2001 / Dinamo Zagreb 2004)
- Miroslav Blažević (as manager: Dinamo Zagreb 1981–1983, 1985–1988, 1992–1994, 2002–2003 / Hajduk Split 2005)
- Željko Kopić (as manager: Hajduk Split 2017–2018 / Dinamo Zagreb 2021–2022)

=== Top scorers ===
Updated 22 November 2019

Rank	Player	Club	Goals
1	Slaven Zambata	Dinamo Zagreb	12
2	Andrija Anković	Hajduk Split	8
2	Igor Cvitanović	Dinamo Zagreb	8
2	Duje Čop	Dinamo Zagreb	8
2	Eduardo da Silva	Dinamo Zagreb	8
2	Joško Vidošević	Hajduk Split	8
3	Mijo Caktaš	Hajduk Split	7
3	Marko Livaja	Hajduk Split	7
3	Frane Matošić	Hajduk Split	7
3	El Arabi Hillel Soudani	Dinamo Zagreb	7
3	Bernard Vukas	Hajduk Split	7
3	Franjo Wölfl	Dinamo Zagreb	7

== Honours ==
These are the major football honours of Dinamo and Hajduk.

Competition	Dinamo Zagreb	Hajduk Split
Croatian Championship (1992–present)	26	6
Croatian Cup (1992–present)	17	8
Croatian Supercup (1992–present)	8	5
Yugoslav Championship (1923–1940 and 1946–1991)	9	9
Yugoslav Cup (1947–1991)	8	9
Socialist Republic of Croatia (1945–1946)	0	2
Independent State of Croatia League (1940–1945)	1	0
Banovina of Croatia (1939–1941)	0	1
Inter-Cities Fairs Cup (1955–1971)	1	–
Total	70	40

== Domestic league results ==
=== Yugoslav First League results (1946–1991) ===
The tables list the place each team took in each of the seasons.

	46–47	47–48	48–49	1950	1951	1952	52–53	53–54	54–55	55–56	56–57	57–58	58–59	59–60	60–61	61–62	62–63	63–64	64–65	65–66	66–67	67–68	68–69
No. of teams	14	10	10	10	12	12	12	14	14	14	14	14	12	12	12	12	14	14	15	16	16	16	18
Dinamo	2	1	4	4	2	4	7	1	3	4	5	1	5	2	4	3	2	3	8	2	2	3	2
Hajduk	4	2	3	1	3	1	2	4	1	12	3	9	7	5	3	5	11	10	12	13	7	4	6

	69–70	70–71	71–72	72–73	73–74	74–75	75–76	76–77	77–78	78–79	79–80	80–81	81–82	82–83	83–84	84–85	85–86	86–87	87–88	88–89	89–90	90–91
No. of teams	18	18	18	18	18	18	18	18	18	18	18	18	18	18	18	18	18	18	18	18	18	19
Dinamo	6	3	8	8	7	5	3	2	4	2	12	5	1	3	12	6	6	6	4	5	2	2
Hajduk	7	1	10	9	1	1	2	8	3	1	5	2	3	2	5	2	4	8	13	3	3	6

=== HNL results (1992 onwards) ===
The tables list the place each team took in each of the seasons.

	1992	92–93	93–94	94–95	95–96	96–97	97–98	98–99	99–00	00–01	01–02	02–03	03–04	04–05	05–06	06–07	07–08
No. of teams	12	16	18	16	12	16	12	12	12	12	16	12	12	12	12	12	12
Dinamo	5	1	3	2	1	1	1	1	1	2	3	1	2	7	1	1	1
Hajduk	1	2	1	1	2	2	2	3	2	1	2	2	1	1	5	2	5

	08–09	09–10	10–11	11–12	12–13	13–14	14–15	15–16	16–17	17–18	18–19	19–20	20–21	21–22	22–23	23–24	24-25	25-26
No. of teams	12	16	16	16	12	10	10	10	10	10	10	10	10	10	10	10	10	10
Dinamo	1	1	1	1	1	1	1	1	2	1	1	1	1	1	1	1	2	1
Hajduk	2	2	2	2	4	3	3	3	3	3	4	5	4	2	2	3	3	2

== See also ==
- Adriatic derby
- Dinamo–Rijeka derby
