= 1978–79 NK Dinamo Zagreb season =

Dinamo Zagreb
1978–79 season
- President: Vid Ročić
- Manager: Vlatko Marković
- Stadium: Stadion Maksimir
- 1. Federal League: 2nd place
- Yugoslav Cup: First round (R32)
- Top goalscorer: Snješko Cerin; Zlatko Kranjčar (13 goals each)
- Highest home attendance: 60,000 vs Red Star (10 September 1978)
- Lowest home attendance: 3,000 vs Sloboda (26 August 1978)

The 1978–79 season was the 33rd season of competitive football played by NK Dinamo Zagreb since the foundation of the Yugoslav First League.

== First Federal League ==
=== Matches ===
Date	Opponents	Home / Away	Result (F – A)	Dinamo scorers	Attendance
12 Aug 1978	Rijeka	A	1 – 2	Bobinac	8,000
20 Aug 1978	Sarajevo	H	2 – 1	Bručić, Cerin	20,000
23 Aug 1978	NK Zagreb	A	2 – 2	Cerin, Bručić	30,000
26 Aug 1978	Sloboda	H	2 – 0	Bručić, Džoni	3,000
3 Sep 1978	Partizan	A	3 – 3	Cerin (2), Bručić	35,000
10 Sep 1978	Red Star	H	2 – 2	Džoni, Senzen	60,000
17 Sep 1978	Budućnost	A	2 – 3	Džoni, Bogdan	17,000
24 Sep 1978	Napredak	H	4 – 0	Mlinarić (2), Bogdan, Bručić	22,000
8 Oct 1978	Olimpija	A	2 – 3	Vabec, Džoni	13,000
14 Oct 1978	Hajduk Split	H	2 – 2	Kranjčar, Džoni	45,000
29 Oct 1978	Željezničar	A	1 – 0	Zajec	15,000
5 Nov 1978	OFK Belgrade	A	3 – 2	Cerin (2), Vabec	5,000
12 Nov 1978	Radnički Niš	H	3 – 1	Vabec, Senzen, Cerin	16,000
19 Nov 1978	Borac	A	2 – 2	Džoni, Janjanin	10,000
26 Nov 1978	Osijek	H	2 – 1	Cerin, Vabec	10,000
29 Nov 1978	Velež	A	0 – 0		12,000
3 Dec 1978	Vojvodina	H	2 – 0	Kranjčar, Džoni	20,000
4 Mar 1979	Rijeka	H	1 – 0	Bogdan	40,000
11 Mar 1979	Sarajevo	A	1 – 0	Vabec	20,000
18 Mar 1979	NK Zagreb	H	3 – 2	Cerin (2), Džoni	30,000
25 Mar 1979	Sloboda	A	0 – 2		8,000
8 Apr 1979	Partizan	H	1 – 0	Vabec	35,000
15 Apr 1979	Red Star	A	2 – 1	Bručić, Kranjčar	25,000
21 Apr 1979	Budućnost	H	3 – 0	Kranjčar (3)	12,000
29 Apr 1979	Napredak	A	2 – 2	Kranjčar, Džoni	15,000
6 May 1979	Olimpija	H	1 – 1	Kranjčar	8,000
9 May 1979	Hajduk Split	A	2 – 1	Kranjčar, Vabec	30,000
13 May 1979	Željezničar	H	2 – 1	Kranjčar, Marić	25,000
20 May 1979	OFK Belgrade	H	3 – 0	Own goal, Džoni, Marić	15,000
26 May 1979	Radnički Niš	A	1 – 2	Vujadinović	7,000
30 May 1979	Borac	H	4 – 0	Kranjčar (2), Cerin, Džoni	10,000
2 Jun 1979	Osijek	A	2 – 1	Vabec (2)	10,000
10 Jun 1979	Velež	H	3 – 1	Cerin (2), Kranjčar	25,000
17 Jun 1979	Vojvodina	A	1 – 0	Vabec	15,000

=== Classification ===
Pos	Team	Pld	W	D	L	GF	GA	GD	Pts	Qualification or relegation
1	Hajduk Split (C)	34	20	10	4	62	28	+34	50	Qualification for European Cup first round
2	Dinamo Zagreb	34	21	8	5	67	38	+29	50	Qualification for UEFA Cup first round
3	Red Star Belgrade	34	16	9	9	51	33	+18	41	Qualification for UEFA Cup first round
4	Sarajevo	34	17	5	12	56	53	+3	39	
5	Velež	34	15	8	11	50	41	+9	38	

Source: rsssf.org
Rules for classification: 1) points; 2) goal difference; 3) number of goals scored.
(C) Champions

=== Results by round ===
Round	1	2	3	4	5	6	7	8	9	10	11	12	13	14	15	16	17	18	19	20	21	22	23	24	25	26	27	28	29	30	31	32	33	34
Ground	A	H	A	H	A	H	A	H	A	H	A	A	H	A	H	A	H	H	A	H	A	H	A	H	A	H	A	H	H	A	H	A	H	A
Result	L	W	D	W	D	D	L	W	L	D	W	W	W	D	W	D	W	W	W	W	L	W	W	W	D	D	W	W	W	L	W	W	W	W
Position	13	8	6	5	8	7	10	7	10	10	7	6	3	4	2	2	2	2	2	2	2	2	2	2	2	2	2	2	2	2	2	2	2	2

A = Away; H = Home; W = Win; D = Draw; L = Loss

=== Results summary ===
Overall								Home						Away					
Pld	W	D	L	GF	GA	GD	Pts	W	D	L	GF	GA	GD	W	D	L	GF	GA	GD
34	21	8	5	67	38	+29	50	14	3	0	40	12	+28	7	5	5	27	26	+1

N.B. Points awarded for a win: 2

== Marshal Tito Cup ==
Date	Round	Opponents	Home / Away	Result (F – A)	Dinamo scorers	Attendance
30 Aug 1978	First round	Velež	H	2 – 2 (2 – 3 p)	Bogdan (2)	15,000

== Players ==
=== Squad statistics ===
Appearances for competitive matches only. Age as of 12 August 1978, first match day of the season.

Pos.	Name	Birth date and age	Apps	Goals	Apps	Goals	Apps	Goals
Pos.	Name	Birth date and age	League		Cup		Total	
GK	(Socialist Federal Republic of Yugoslavia) Želimir Stinčić	13 July 1950 (aged 28)	32	0	1	0	33	0
DF	(Socialist Federal Republic of Yugoslavia) Vilson Džoni	29 September 1950 (aged 27)	30	11	1	0	31	11
	(Socialist Federal Republic of Yugoslavia) Čedomir Jovičević	14 June 1952 (aged 26)	13	0	1	0	14	0
DF	(Socialist Federal Republic of Yugoslavia) Velimir Zajec	12 February 1956 (aged 22)	29	1	1	0	30	1
DF	(Socialist Federal Republic of Yugoslavia) Martin Novoselac	10 November 1950 (aged 27)	14	0	1	0	15	0
DF	(Socialist Federal Republic of Yugoslavia) Srećko Bogdan	5 January 1957 (aged 21)	32	3	1	2	33	5
	(Socialist Federal Republic of Yugoslavia) Radimir Bobinac	8 July 1958 (aged 20)	7	1	1	0	8	1
	(Socialist Federal Republic of Yugoslavia) Petar Bručić	28 June 1953 (aged 25)	31	6	1	0	32	6
FW	(Socialist Federal Republic of Yugoslavia) Zlatko Kranjčar	15 November 1956 (aged 21)	26	13	0	0	26	13
DF	(Socialist Federal Republic of Yugoslavia) Džemal Mustedanagić	8 June 1955 (aged 23)	25	0	1	0	26	0
	(Socialist Federal Republic of Yugoslavia) Marko Mlinarić	1 September 1960 (aged 17)	9	2	0	0	9	2
	(Socialist Federal Republic of Yugoslavia) Savko Marić	2 December 1955 (aged 22)	17	2	0	0	17	2
	(Socialist Federal Republic of Yugoslavia) Veljko Tukša	21 November 1950 (aged 27)	2	0	0	0	2	0
FW	(Socialist Federal Republic of Yugoslavia) Ivica Senzen	4 May 1951 (aged 27)	24	2	1	0	25	2
MF	(Socialist Federal Republic of Yugoslavia) Rajko Janjanin	18 January 1957 (aged 21)	32	1	1	0	33	1
FW	(Socialist Federal Republic of Yugoslavia) Snješko Cerin	18 January 1955 (aged 23)	32	13	1	0	33	13
	(Socialist Federal Republic of Yugoslavia) Ivica Poljak	23 November 1951 (aged 26)	5	0	0	0	5	0
	(Socialist Federal Republic of Yugoslavia) Branko Devčić	8 March 1956 (aged 22)	13	0	0	0	13	0
	(Socialist Federal Republic of Yugoslavia) Branko Tucak	19 June 1952 (aged 26)	11	0	0	0	11	0
	(Socialist Federal Republic of Yugoslavia) Spaso Papić		1	0	0	0	1	0
	(Socialist Federal Republic of Yugoslavia) Mladen Župetić	17 December 1955 (aged 22)	1	0	0	0	1	0
GK	(Socialist Federal Republic of Yugoslavia) Tomislav Ivković	11 August 1960 (aged 18)	3	0	0	0	3	0
	(Socialist Federal Republic of Yugoslavia) Drago Vabec	26 October 1950 (aged 27)	24	10	0	0	24	10
	(Socialist Federal Republic of Yugoslavia) Rajko Vujadinović	13 April 1956 (aged 22)	7	1	1	0	8	1
	(Socialist Federal Republic of Yugoslavia) Ivan Bedi	17 November 1952 (aged 25)	8	0	0	0	8	0
	(Socialist Federal Republic of Yugoslavia) Mario Bonić	4 August 1952 (aged 26)	4	0	0	0	4	0

== See also ==
- 1978–79 Yugoslav First League
- 1978–79 Yugoslav Cup

== Bibliography ==
- Podnar, Ozren (2006). Dinamo svetinja : sve o najvećem hrvatskom klubu. VBZ. ISBN 953-201-585-X.
