= Josip Kuže =

Croatian football player and manager (1952–2013)

- Kuže at a news conference in 2010

Personal information
- Date of birth: 13 November 1952
- Place of birth: Vranje, PR Serbia, FPR Yugoslavia
- Date of death: 16 June 2013 (aged 60)
- Place of death: Zagreb, Croatia
- Position: Defender

Senior career*
Years	Team	Apps	(Gls)
1971–1981	Dinamo Zagreb	151	(5)

Managerial career
- 1982–1984: Sydney Croatia
- 1985–1986: BSK Slavonski Brod
- 1986–1988: Dinamo Zagreb (youth)
- 1988–1989: Borac Banja Luka
- 1989–1990: Dinamo Zagreb
- 1990: Budućnost Titograd
- 1991–1992: Rot-Weiß Erfurt
- 1992–1994: Mainz 05
- 1996–1997: Gamba Osaka
- 1998–1999: NK Zagreb
- 2000: Chemnitz
- 2003–2004: Inter Zaprešić
- 2005–2006: Dinamo Zagreb
- 2007: Rijeka
- 2007: Varteks
- 2007–2008: Rwanda
- 2008: JEF United Chiba
- 2009–2011: Albania
- 2012: Tianjin Teda
- * Club domestic league appearances and goals

Josip Kuže (13 November 1952 – 16 June 2013) was a Croatian football manager and footballer. He was a player and later a manager of Dinamo Zagreb where he played for 10 years, making a total of 384 appearances and scoring 14 goals.

== Playing career ==
He was a professional football player with Dinamo Zagreb, winning 11 Yugoslavian U-21 caps. He played a minor role among the great players who still have their huge amount of respect today. During his playing years with Dinamo as a defender from 1971 to 1981 he played in 384 games scoring 14 goals. Kuže scored only 1 goal in 1975/1976 season. During his career he played alongside Balkan footballing greats such as Zlatko Kranjčar, Snješko Cerin, Srećko Bogdan, Velimir Zajec, Ivica Senzen, Marko Mlinarić, Ismet Hadžić, Boro Cvetković and Stjepan Deverić.

== Managerial career ==
After his playing career finished he started as coach of Sydney Croatia (1982–84) then he coached clubs such as BSK Slavonski Brod (1985–86), Dinamo Zagreb youth (1986–88), Borac Banja Luka (1988–89) before he became Dinamo Zagreb's coach in (1989–91). In 1991, he started coaching in Germany with FC Rot-Weiß Erfurt (1991–92) and later accepted the job from league-competition FSV Mainz 05, and stayed there until 1994. From 1995 to 1998, he coached Japanese side Gamba Osaka. Kuže came back to Croatia to coach NK Zagreb (1998–99) and had a short stint with FC Chemnitz in 2000 and proceeded to coach Gamba Osaka again from 2000 to 2002. He then went to manage Inter Zaprešić from 2003 to 2004 and in 2005 he took over coaching of Dinamo Zagreb again, winning the league title in his first year as coach.

=== Dinamo Zagreb coach ===
He took over the team after they suffered a poor year, finishing down in seventh place. With some new players, he enjoyed early success in the next championship (2005/2006) with 18-2-2 61:11 record in first part of the league, and the final record, after playoffs, was 24-4-4 78:21. After the first ten games, Dinamo's goal-difference was 32:3, which gave them the highest goal-difference for any professional club in Europe. During this time Dinamo were accredited with playing attractive football.

In the new season, 2006–07, some high-class players arrived, and Dinamo, beat French side Auxerre 2–1 during a pre-season friendly. Gameplay went worse in the new season, for the key defense midfielders could not give their best due to injuries, but still tremendous effort was made in second leg of Champions league qualifying round against Arsenal in London despite being 3-0 down from the first leg in Zagreb. Playing with a 5-3-2 formation, a much improved Dinamo side from the first leg, held a 1–0 lead until late into the game before Arsenal managed to turn it around with ten minutes remaining and eventually came away with a 2–1 victory. Despite the defeat Dinamo were praised, along with Kuze, for an impressive performance despite some injury concerns, Mathias Chago, Davor Vugrinec and Jens Nowotny all missed the match due to injury.

Despite his success in getting Dinamo in a position to challenge for the Croatian league after several below-par years, his team's performance against Arsenal was deemed not good enough and he left the club in November 2006 with both Kuze and the club stating the agreement was made with mutual consent.

=== Rwanda national team ===
In November 2007 Kuze was appointed manager of the Rwanda replacing Michael Nees who was sacked after failing to qualify for the 2008 African Cup of Nations. His initial contract will run for three years.

=== JEF United Chiba ===
In January 2008, Japan's J1 League side JEF United Chiba announced that they appointed Kuze as their head coach. However, this reign lasted just four months., and he was replaced by Alex Miller.

=== Albania national team coach ===
Kuže entered in the history of Albania as the coach with the largest victory against Cyprus in 2009, 6–1 in a friendly. As of 27 March 2011 and after 18 months at the job, he has had four victories (including friendlies, with Cyprus and Northern Ireland), three losses, and five draws (of which an important one against Denmark in the 2010 World Cup qualifiers). He is still warmly remembered by the Red and Black Fans organization for deeply affiliating with the Albania national team.

=== Tianjin Teda ===
Kuže was appointed as the new manager of Chinese Super League side Tianjin Teda on 6 January 2012. On 20 May, Kuže waved money towards the referee after a Super League match which Tianjin Teda lost to Liaoning Whowin 2-1 by a controversial penalty in the stoppage time. On 22 May, he received a ban of 7 matches and was fined ¥38,000 by CFA for his act and his remarks on the press conference. He was released by Tianjin Teda on 28 May.

== Managerial statistics ==
Team	From	To	Record				
Team	From	To	G	W	D	L	Win %
Gamba Osaka	1996	1997	62	31	0	31	50.00
JEF United Chiba	1 February 2008	7 May 2008	11	0	2	9	0.00
Albania	6 June 2009	15 November 2011	27	9	8	10	33.33
Total			100	40	10	50	40.00

== Death ==
On 16 June 2013, Kuže died of leukemia in Zagreb, aged 60, after a several months' battle with the disease.
