= 1954–55 NK Hajduk Split season =

Hajduk Split
1954–55 season
- Chairman: Marko Markovina
- Manager: Aleksandar Tomašević
- First League: 1st
- Yugoslav Cup: Semi-finals
- Top goalscorer: League: Bernard Vukas (20); All: Joško Vidošević (24)

The 1954–55 season was the 44th season in Hajduk Split’s history and their 9th in the Yugoslav First League. Their 4th place finish in the 1953–54 season meant it was their 9th successive season playing in the Yugoslav First League.

== Competitions ==
=== Overall ===
Competition	Started round	Final result	First match	Last Match
1954–55 Yugoslav First League	–	1st	29 August	19 June
1954 Yugoslav Cup	First round	Semi-finals	18 August	7 November

=== Yugoslav First League ===
==== Classification ====
Pos	Team	Pld	W	D	L	GF	GA	GR	Pts	Qualification or relegation
1	Hajduk Split (C)	26	16	6	4	69	27	2.556	38	
2	BSK	26	15	6	5	61	43	1.419	36	
3	Dinamo Zagreb	26	14	6	6	54	49	1.102	34	
4	Red Star	26	14	5	7	57	36	1.583	33	
5	Partizan	26	12	6	8	58	36	1.611	30	Qualification for the European Cup first round

Source: rsssf.org
Rules for classification: 1st points; 2nd goal average
(C) Champions

== Matches ==
=== Yugoslav First League ===
Round	Date	Venue	Opponent	Score	Hajduk Scorers
1	29 Aug	A	Red Star	2 – 2	Vukas, Luštica
2	12 Sep	H	Proleter Osijek	5 – 3	Kragić (2), Vidošević (2), Šenauer
3	19 Sep	A	Vardar	2 – 1	Šenauer, Kragić
4	13 Oct	A	Vojvodina	1 – 1	Šenauer
5	24 Oct	H	Partizan	2 – 1	Vidošević, Matošić
6	27 Oct	H	Dinamo Zagreb	1 – 1	Vidošević
7	31 Oct	H	BSK Beograd	6 – 2	Rebac (3), Vukas, Vidošević, Matošić
8	10 Nov	H	Lokomotiva	7 – 0	Vukas (2), Vidošević (2), Matošić (2), Šenauer
9	14 Nov	A	Spartak Subotica	3 – 4	Vukas (2), Radović
10	21 Nov	A	NK Zagreb	0 – 0	
11	28 Nov	H	Željezničar	1 – 0	Vukas
12	5 Dec	H	Sarajevo	0 – 1	
13	12 Dec	A	Radnički Beograd	1 – 0	Broketa
14	13 Mar	H	Red Star	4 – 1	Matošić (2), Vukas, Vidošević
15	20 Mar	A	Proleter Osijek	0 – 0	
16	27 Mar	H	Vardar	6 – 0	Vukas (4), Vidošević, Rebac
17	3 Apr	A	Dinamo Zagreb	6 – 0	Vukas (2), Vidošević (2), Rebac (2)
18	17 Apr	H	Vojvodina	2 – 1	Vidošević, Vukas
19	24 Apr	A	Partizan	1 – 0	Rebac
20	8 May	H	BSK Beograd	0 – 0	
21	18 May	A	Lokomotiva	3 – 1	Rebac, Matošić, Šenauer
22	2 Jun	H	Spartak Subotica	4 – 1	Šenauer, Vidošević, Matošić, Vukas
23	5 Jun	A	Željezničar	2 – 3	Vukas, D. Grčić
24	8 Jun	H	NK Zagreb	4 – 0	Vukas (2), Vidošević, Šenauer
25	12 Jun	A	Sarajevo	1 – 3	Vidošević
26	19 Jun	H	Radnički Beograd	5 – 1	Vidošević (3), Rebac, Vukas

Sources: hajduk.hr

=== Yugoslav Cup ===
Round	Date	Venue	Opponent	Score	Hajduk Scorers
R1	18 Aug	A	Proleter Osijek	2 – 0	Vukas, Matošić
R2	26 Aug	A	Rabotnički	7 – 0	Vidošević (3), Matošić, Dadić, Rebac, Vukas
QF	10 Oct	A	Odred Ljubljana	5 – 1	Vidošević (3), Šenauer, Matošić
SF	7 Nov	H	Partizan	0 – 4	

Sources: hajduk.hr

== Player seasonal records ==
=== Top scorers ===
Rank	Name	League	Cup	Total
1	(Socialist Federal Republic of Yugoslavia) Joško Vidošević	18	6	24
2	(Socialist Federal Republic of Yugoslavia) Bernard Vukas	20	2	22
3	(Socialist Federal Republic of Yugoslavia) Frane Matošić	8	3	11
4	(Socialist Federal Republic of Yugoslavia) Sulejman Rebac	9	1	10
5	(Socialist Federal Republic of Yugoslavia) Vladimir Šenauer	7	1	8
6	(Socialist Federal Republic of Yugoslavia) Bogdan Kragić	3	–	3
7	(Socialist Federal Republic of Yugoslavia) Božo Broketa	1	–	1
7	(Socialist Federal Republic of Yugoslavia) Leo Dadić	–	1	1
7	(Socialist Federal Republic of Yugoslavia) Davor Grčić	1	–	1
7	(Socialist Federal Republic of Yugoslavia) Slavko Luštica	1	–	1
7	(Socialist Federal Republic of Yugoslavia) Nikola Radović	1	–	1
	TOTALS	69	14	83

Source: Competitive matches

== See also ==
- 1954–55 Yugoslav First League
- 1954 Yugoslav Cup

== External sources ==
- 1954–55 Yugoslav Cup at rsssf.com
- 1954–55 Yugoslav First League at historical-lineups.com
