= Snješko Cerin =

Croatian footballer

Personal information
- Full name: Snježan Cerin
- Date of birth: 18 January 1955 (age 71)
- Place of birth: Zagreb, FPR Yugoslavia
- Position: Forward

Senior career*
Years	Team	Apps	(Gls)
1972–1975	Trnje		
1976	Zagrebački Plavi		
1976–1986	Dinamo Zagreb	216	(101)
1985	Kansas City Comets (indoor)	3	(1)
1986–1987	Austria Klagenfurt	14	(1)
Total		233	(103)
- * Club domestic league appearances and goals

Snježan "Snješko" Cerin (born 18 January 1955; also known as John Cerin in the United States) is a retired Croatian association football striker who spent most of his career playing for his hometown club Dinamo Zagreb in the Yugoslav First League in the 1970s and 1980s.

== Club career ==
A native of Zagreb, Cerin started playing at NK Trnje, a small local amateur club, in the early 1970s. In 1976, he moved to another local side, third-level minnows NK Zagrebački Plavi, who later merged with NK Zagreb in 1980.

In April 1976 the Yugoslavia national football team decided to play a training match against Zagrebački Plavi in preparation for their UEFA Euro 1976 qualifier versus Wales played in Zagreb. The game proved to be a turning point for Cerin, as he managed to score a hat-trick for him humble side against the national team and their stalwart goalkeeper Ognjen Petrović.

The 21-year-old Cerin instantly became sought after by top clubs in Yugoslavia. He was first invited by Tomislav Ivić to join Hajduk Split, but the deal never materialised, as Ivić left Hajduk for Netherlands only a few months later, at the end of the 1975–76 season, to take over Ajax. Local powerhouse Dinamo Zagreb then offered him a professional contract, so Cerin joined the club for the 1976–77 season.

Cerin then had to wait for his Dinamo debut almost six months under coach Mirko Bazić. Cerin eventually scored his first goal for Dinamo in a 3–1 friendly win against GOŠK Dubrovnik on 10 November 1976. His league debut came a week later, on 17 November, in a 6–1 home win against Budućnost, in which he scored a brace. His first goal for Dinamo against international opposition came in a 4–0 win against Ajax led by Tomislav Ivić at the Trofej Marjan international tournament played in Split on 17 February 1977.

By the late 1970s Cerin established himself as one of Dinamo's most prolific scorers, and is best remembered for leading the club to the Yugoslav championship title in the 1981–82 season, their first national league title in 24 years. He was also the league's top scorer with 19 goals that year.

In spite of his prolific abilities, now 27-year-old Cerin was not selected for the Yugoslavia squad which played at the 1982 FIFA World Cup in Spain that summer, with national manager Miljan Miljanić opting to take Cerin's Dinamo teammate Stjepan Deverić instead.

Between 1976 and 1986 Cerin spent ten seasons with Dinamo, and was the club's leading goalscorer in five of those seasons. Apart from the 1981–82 league title he also helped Dinamo win two Yugoslav Cups (in 1980 and 1983). He made a total of 474 appearances for Dinamo across all competition, scoring 295 goals for the club. This includes 216 appearances and 101 goals in the Yugoslav First League, which made him the club's top all-time scorer of the Yugoslav era.

Alongside players such as Marko Mlinarić, Velimir Zajec, Stjepan Deverić, and Zlatko Kranjčar, Cerin was part of one of the most successful periods in Dinamo's history, as during his time at the club they also finished runners-up in the league twice (1976–77, 1978–79) and runners-up in the national cup three times (1982, 1985, 1986). However, in spite of his excellent scoring record, Cerin was constantly overlooked by national team managers and was never called to play for Yugoslavia.

In 1985 Cerin left Croatia briefly to play in the American Major Indoor Soccer League (MISL), where he was known as "John Cerin". He scored a single goal in three matches for the Kansas City Comets.

He was recalled to Dinamo by his former manager Miroslav Blažević in the winter break of the 1985–86 season. Cerin played for Dinamo one half-season under Blažević, finishing sixth in the league, and missing out on qualifying for an UEFA Cup spot by a single point, in a season best remembered for the huge match-fixing scandal on the last match day.

Cerin then left the club for good in 1986, to play a single season at SK Austria Klagenfurt in Austria. He then returned to Zagreb and appeared in a handful of games for another small local side NK Novi Zagreb, before retiring from football completely by the late 1980s.

After retirement, Cerin opened a pub in Zagreb which he ran well into the 1990s. By 2001, he had moved to Privlaka, a small seaside town near Zadar, where he opened a small privately owned retirement home.

== Honours ==
Club

- Yugoslav League Championship
  - Winner: 1981–82
  - Runner-up: 1976–77, 1978–79
- Yugoslav Football Cup
  - Winner: 1979–80, 1982–83
  - Runner-up: 1981–82, 1984–85, 1985–86

Individual

- Yugoslav League Championship top scorer: 1981–82
