= Croatian Footballer of the Year =

Annual football award in Croatia

The Croatian Footballer of the Year (Croatian: Nogometaš godine) is the most prestigious annual association football award in Croatia. It is awarded by the newspaper Večernji list to the best Croatian football player in the preceding year, regardless of the league they play in, based on a points system which measures their performances for both club and country. The award is usually presented in a ceremony hosted by the Croatian Football Federation.

The award was established in 1972 and, until 1990, the award was given to the best Yugoslav player in the preceding year. Since the breakup of Yugoslavia in 1991, the award is given to the best Croatian player. Luka Modrić holds the record for most wins, with fourteen awards. Davor Šuker is second with six awards. They are followed by Dado Pršo with three wins from 2003 to 2005.

In 1995, a separate award, the Hope of the Year (Croatian: Nada godine), was introduced. It is awarded to the best young Croatian player. As of 2026, only Ivica Olić and Luka Modrić have won both the Hope of the Year and Footballer of the Year awards.

== List of winners ==
=== Yugoslav Footballer of the Year (1972–90) ===
† denotes shared wins

Year	Yugoslav Footballer of the Year			
Year	Player (Wins)	Age	Pos.	Club
1972	Dušan Bajević	24	FW	(Socialist Federal Republic of Yugoslavia) Velež
1973	Enver Marić	25	GK	(Socialist Federal Republic of Yugoslavia) Velež
1974	Josip Katalinski	26	DF	(Socialist Federal Republic of Yugoslavia) Željezničar
1975	Ivan Buljan	26	DF	(Socialist Federal Republic of Yugoslavia) Hajduk Split
1976	Ivica Šurjak	23	MF	(Socialist Federal Republic of Yugoslavia) Hajduk Split
1977	Dražen Mužinić	24	MF	(Socialist Federal Republic of Yugoslavia) Hajduk Split
1978	Vilson Džoni †	28	DF	(Socialist Federal Republic of Yugoslavia) Dinamo Zagreb
1978	Nenad Stojković †	22	DF	(Socialist Federal Republic of Yugoslavia) Partizan
1979	Safet Sušić †	24	MF	(Socialist Federal Republic of Yugoslavia) FK Sarajevo
1979	Velimir Zajec †	23	MF	(Socialist Federal Republic of Yugoslavia) Dinamo Zagreb
1980	Vladimir Petrović	25	MF	(Socialist Federal Republic of Yugoslavia) Red Star
1981	Zlatko Vujović	23	FW	(Socialist Federal Republic of Yugoslavia) Hajduk Split
1982	Ivan Gudelj	22	MF	(Socialist Federal Republic of Yugoslavia) Hajduk Split
1983	Zoran Simović	29	GK	(Socialist Federal Republic of Yugoslavia) Hajduk Split
1984	Velimir Zajec (2)	28	MF	(Greece) Panathinaikos
1985	Blaž Slišković	26	MF	(Socialist Federal Republic of Yugoslavia) Hajduk Split
1986	Semir Tuce	22	MF	(Socialist Federal Republic of Yugoslavia) Velež
1987	Marko Mlinarić	27	MF	(Socialist Federal Republic of Yugoslavia) Dinamo Zagreb
1988	Dragan Stojković	23	MF	(Socialist Federal Republic of Yugoslavia) Red Star
1989	Dragan Stojković (2)	24	MF	(Socialist Federal Republic of Yugoslavia) Red Star
1990	Robert Prosinečki	21	MF	(Socialist Federal Republic of Yugoslavia) Red Star

=== Croatian Footballer of the Year (1991–present) ===
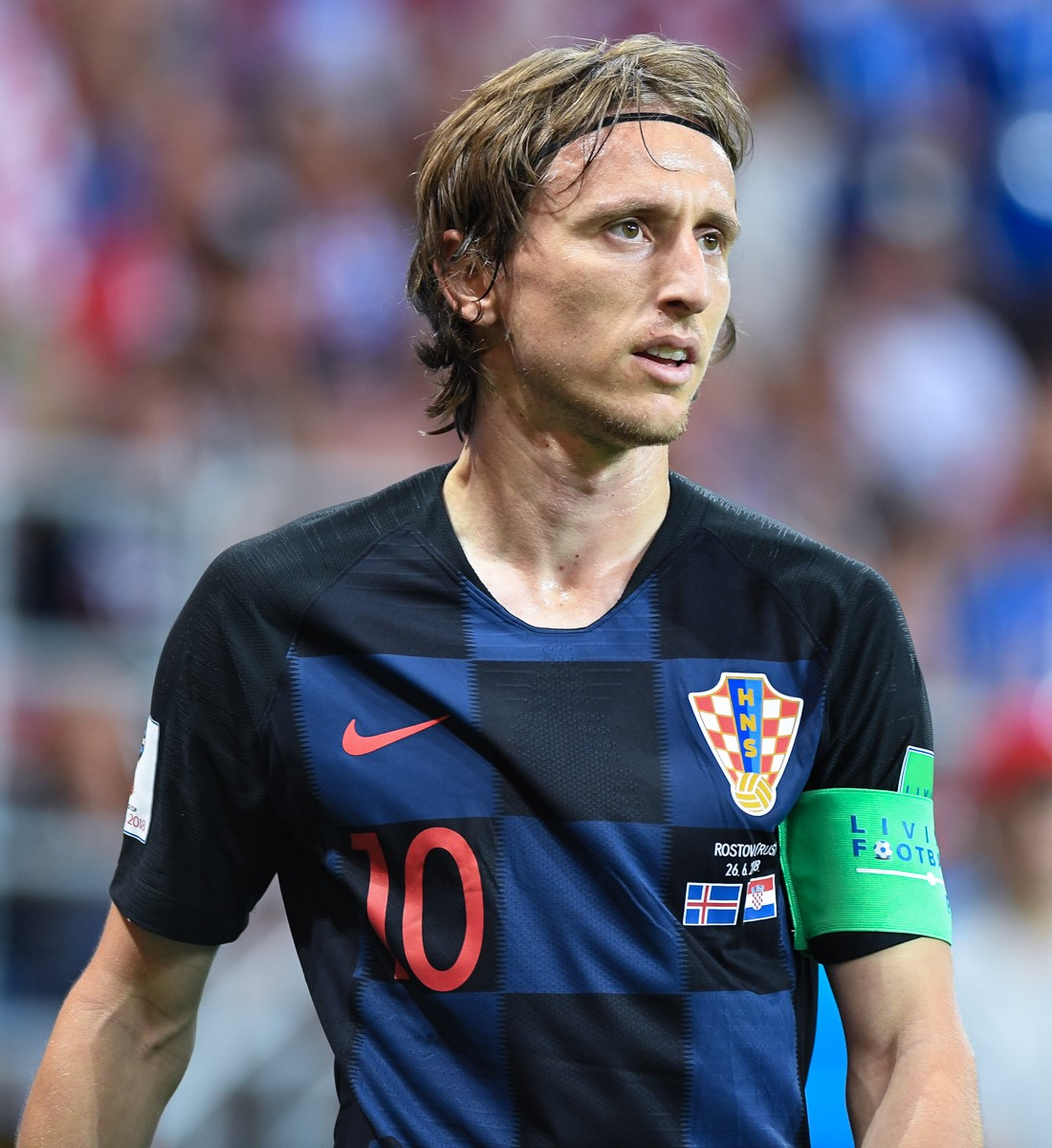
Luka Modrić holds the record for most wins with fourteen awards

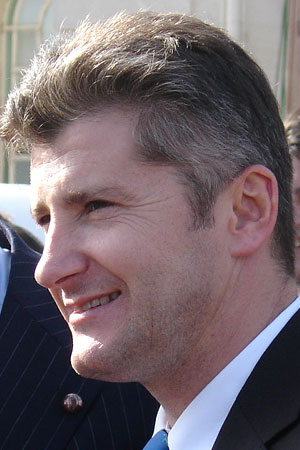
Davor Šuker won the title six times

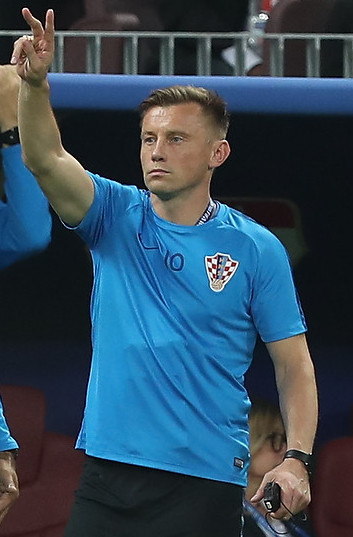
Ivica Olić, along with Luka Modrić, is the only player to win both the Croatian Footballer of the Year and the Hope of the Year awards

Year	Croatian Footballer of the Year				Hope of the Year			
Year	Player (Wins)	Age	Pos.	Club	Player	Age	Pos.	Club
1991	Zvonimir Boban	23	MF	(Italy) Milan	—			
1992	Davor Šuker	25	FW	(Spain) Sevilla	—			
1993	Alen Bokšić	23	FW	(Italy) Lazio	—			
1994	Davor Šuker (2)	27	FW	(Spain) Sevilla	—			
1995	Davor Šuker (3)	28	FW	(Spain) Sevilla	Dario Šimić	20	DF	Croatia Zagreb
1996	Davor Šuker (4)	29	FW	(Spain) Real Madrid	Jurica Vučko	20	FW	(Croatia) Hajduk Split
1997	Robert Prosinečki (2) †	28	MF	Croatia Zagreb	Silvio Marić	22	MF	Croatia Zagreb
1997	Davor Šuker (5) †	30	FW	(Spain) Real Madrid	Silvio Marić	22	MF	Croatia Zagreb
1998	Davor Šuker (6)	31	FW	(Spain) Real Madrid	Jurica Vranješ	18	MF	(Croatia) Osijek
1999	Zvonimir Boban (2)	31	MF	(Italy) Milan	Tomo Šokota	22	FW	Croatia Zagreb
2000	Nenad Bjelica	29	MF	(Croatia) Osijek	Krunoslav Lovrek	21	FW	(Croatia) NK Zagreb
2001	Igor Tudor	23	DF	(Italy) Juventus	Ivica Olić	22	FW	(Croatia) NK Zagreb
2002	Stipe Pletikosa	23	GK	(Croatia) Hajduk Split	Niko Kranjčar	18	MF	(Croatia) Dinamo Zagreb
2003	Dado Pršo	29	FW	(France) Monaco	Goran Ljubojević	20	FW	(Croatia) Osijek
2004	Dado Pršo (2)	30	FW	(Scotland) Rangers	Luka Modrić	19	MF	(Croatia) Inter Zaprešić
2005	Dado Pršo (3)	31	FW	(Scotland) Rangers	Leon Benko	22	FW	(Croatia) Varteks
2006	Eduardo	23	FW	(Croatia) Dinamo Zagreb	Ante Rukavina	20	FW	(Croatia) Šibenik
2007	Luka Modrić	22	MF	(Croatia) Dinamo Zagreb	Nikola Kalinić	19	FW	(Croatia) Hajduk Split
2008	Luka Modrić (2)	23	MF	(England) Tottenham Hotspur	Marin Tomasov	21	MF	(Croatia) Zadar
2009	Ivica Olić	30	FW	(Germany) Bayern Munich	Milan Badelj	20	MF	(Croatia) Dinamo Zagreb
2010	Ivica Olić (2)	31	FW	(Germany) Bayern Munich	Šime Vrsaljko	18	DF	(Croatia) Dinamo Zagreb
2011	Luka Modrić (3)	26	MF	(England) Tottenham Hotspur	Mateo Kovačić	17	MF	(Croatia) Dinamo Zagreb
2012	Mario Mandžukić	26	FW	(Germany) Bayern Munich	Franko Andrijašević	21	MF	(Croatia) Hajduk Split
2013	Mario Mandžukić (2)	27	FW	(Germany) Bayern Munich	Ante Rebić	20	FW	(Italy) Fiorentina
2014	Luka Modrić (4)	29	MF	(Spain) Real Madrid	Tin Jedvaj	19	DF	(Germany) Bayer Leverkusen
2015	Ivan Rakitić	27	MF	(Spain) Barcelona	Ante Ćorić	18	MF	(Croatia) Dinamo Zagreb
2016	Luka Modrić (5)	31	MF	(Spain) Real Madrid	Filip Benković	19	DF	(Croatia) Dinamo Zagreb
2017	Luka Modrić (6)	32	MF	(Spain) Real Madrid	Lovro Majer	19	MF	(Croatia) Lokomotiva
2018	Luka Modrić (7)	33	MF	(Spain) Real Madrid	—			
2019	Luka Modrić (8)	34	MF	(Spain) Real Madrid	—			
2020	Luka Modrić (9)	35	MF	(Spain) Real Madrid	—			
2021	Luka Modrić (10)	36	MF	(Spain) Real Madrid	—			
2022	Luka Modrić (11)	37	MF	(Spain) Real Madrid	—			
2023	Luka Modrić (12)	38	MF	(Spain) Real Madrid	—			
2024	Luka Modrić (13)	39	MF	(Spain) Real Madrid	—			
2025	Luka Modrić (14)	40	MF	(Italy) Milan	—			

Notes on club name changes:

- Dinamo Zagreb changed their name to "HAŠK Građanski" in June 1991 and then again in February 1993 to "Croatia Zagreb". They reverted to "Dinamo Zagreb" in February 2000.
- The NK Varteks changed their 52-year-old name to "NK Varaždin" in June 2010, then folded in 2015. Two newer clubs, both unassociated with the defunct team, use the defunct club's names: NK Varteks (founded 2011) and NK Varaždin (founded 2012 as "Varaždin ŠN", picked up the "NK Varaždin" name when the older club folded).

== Multiple winners ==
Players in bold are still active. Wins in italics denote wins in Yugoslav competition before 1991.

Wins	Player	Winning years	Club(s)
14	**Luka Modrić**	2007, 2008, 2011, 2014, 2016, 2017, 2018, 2019, 2020, 2021, 2022, 2023, 2024, 2025	Dinamo Zagreb, Tottenham Hotspur, Real Madrid, Milan
6	Davor Šuker	1992, 1994, 1995, 1996, 1997, 1998	Sevilla, Real Madrid
3	Dado Pršo	2003, 2004, 2005	Monaco, Rangers
2	Velimir Zajec	1979, 1984	Dinamo Zagreb, Panathinaikos
2	Dragan Stojković	1988, 1989	Red Star Belgrade
2	Robert Prosinečki	1990, 1997	Red Star Belgrade, Croatia Zagreb
2	Zvonimir Boban	1991, 1999	Milan
2	Ivica Olić	2009, 2010	Bayern Munich
2	Mario Mandžukić	2012, 2013	Bayern Munich

== See also ==
- Sportske novosti Yellow Shirt award, for the HNL footballer of the year, given by the Croatian sport newspaper Sportske novosti, chosen by sport journalists.
- Football Oscar, given by the Croatian union Football syndicate, chosen by players and managers of league clubs.
- Prva HNL Best Player of the Year, given by the Croatian web site Tportal, chosen by captains of league clubs.
