= Fikret Mujkić =

Bosnian footballer (born 1949)

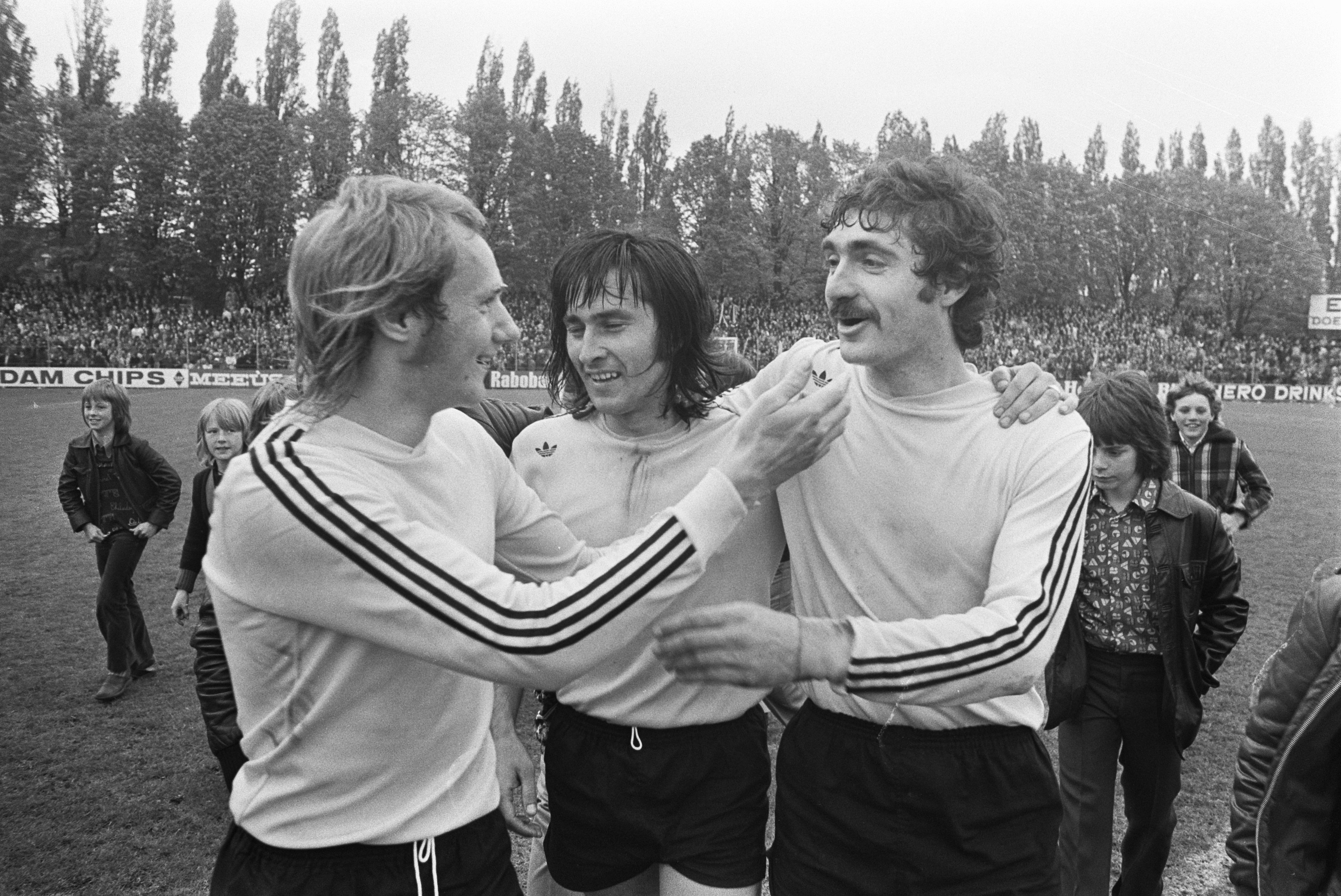
- Mujkić (in the middle) with NAC Breda teammates in 1975

Personal information
- Date of birth: 13 May 1949 (age 77)
- Place of birth: Sarajevo, PR Bosnia-Herzegovina, FPR Yugoslavia
- Position: Winger

Youth career
- Krivaja

Senior career*
Years	Team	Apps	(Gls)
1965–1971	Željezničar	140	(43)
1971–1974	Dinamo Zagreb	35	(12)
1975	NAC	14	(7)
1975–1976	Panathinaikos	16	(7)
1976–1977	Željezničar	17	(9)
Total		222	(78)

International career
	Yugoslavia U-21	45	
1968–1970	Yugoslavia	5	(1)
- * Club domestic league appearances and goals

Fikret "Pike" Mujkić (born 13 May 1949) is a Yugoslav and Bosnian former footballer who played as a winger.

Remembered as an able striker with strong technique, Mujkić, widely known by his nickname Pike, was one of the more promising players of his generation. When he was coming up (the late 1960s and early 1970s), his skill caught the attention of observers who predicted a promising future for him. However, he never managed to reach the predicted level for a variety of reasons, mostly having to do with his inability to fully focus on football and develop his game.

== Club career ==
Born in Sarajevo, Mujkić's career began in FK Željezničar's youth team. As one of the most talented players of his generation, he was soon included in the first team. He was on FK Željezničar's roster for the first part of the 1971–72 season at the end of which the club won its only league title. Mujkić left the club after 140 league matches and during the course of the season, signing a contract with Dinamo Zagreb, which meant that he did not get to lift the trophy.

He played for Dinamo until 1974 appearing in 73 matches (42 goals).

After that, he played for NAC Breda and Panathinaikos. He joined NAC in January 1975 and scored on his league debut against ADO Den Haag. He scored another six goals in the final seven league matches of the season to save NAC from relegation, playing alongside Yugoslav compatriot Nikola Budišić.

He returned to FK Željezničar during the 1976–77 season's winter break. His second stint, however, lasted only half a season. Željezničar got relegated at the end of that season and Mujkić retired from football. During his two stints with Željezničar he played 140 league games (43 goals) for the club.

== International career ==
Mujkić is a record holder for the number of appearances for Yugoslav under-21 team as he played 45 times. He played 23 games for the Olympic team as well.

He made his senior debut for Yugoslavia in a December 1968 friendly match away against Brazil and has earned a total of five caps, scoring one goal. His final international was an April 1970 friendly against Hungary.

== Post-playing ==
=== Hospitality entrepreneurship ===
After retiring from playing football professionally in 1977, Mujkić began running a kafana at Sarajevo's Baščaršija with his brother Midhat "Medo" Mujkić, also a former professional footballer. Located across the alley from the famous Željo ćevabdžinica (ćevapi parlour), the watering hole named MP immediately became known colloquially as Kod Piketa (Pike's), garnering considerable popularity in the city during the 1980s as the favourite hangout for population of surrounding mahalas.

The kafana was also frequented by professional footballers, including FK Sarajevo star Safet "Pape" Sušić who reportedly readily utilized it for business meetings with representatives of football clubs chasing his signature. During spring 1982, ahead of the upcoming World Cup in Spain where he had been poised for a starring role with Yugoslavia, twenty-seven-year-old Sušić—being pursued by Serie A clubs Inter Milan and A.C. Torino—reportedly signed a pre-contract with the nerazzurri at Pike's. Due to the sought-after player later also committing to Torino, the transfer became subject of a legal dispute between the two Italian clubs and Sušić ended up in Paris Saint-Germain.

The Mujkić brothers later reportedly had a falling out for unspecified reasons. Following the Bosnian War, Medo began working as a taxi driver, a job he did in Sarajevo until his death in December 2020.

=== Administrative work ===
Mujkić is currently a member of Bosnian-Herzegovinian Football Association's executive board where he represents Tuzla Canton's FA.

== Personal life ==
In 1969, Mujkić married Serbian actress Radmila Živković who had won the Miss Yugoslavia crown earlier that year. The marriage was short-lived, quickly ending in divorce within a year.

In 1971, while serving his mandatory Yugoslav People's Army (JNA) stint in Požarevac, Mujkić began dating Serbian singer Radmila Karaklajić, another high-profile relationship that received a lot of coverage in Yugoslav press.

== In popular culture ==
Zabranjeno Pušenje track "Probušeni dolar" off their 1987 album Pozdrav iz zemlje Safari features a reference to Đulijano Pike, a fictional character from Sarajevo reportedly inspired by Mujkić. In the context of the song, Đulijano Pike is a local Don Juan womanizer who seduces young girls in Sarajevo's Veliki Park, sleeps with them, and then publicly brags about his sexual conquests thereby tarnishing the girls' reputations.

== External sources ==
- Fikret Mujkić at Reprezentacija.rs (in Serbian)
- Fikret Mujkić at National-Football-Teams.com
