= 1954–55 Yugoslav First League =

Prva savezna liga
- Season: 1954–55
- Champions: Hajduk Split; 3rd Federal League title 5th Yugoslav title overall
- Relegated: Vardar; Lokomotiva
- European Cup: Partizan
- Top goalscorer: Predrag Marković; Kosta Tomašević; Bernard Vukas (20 goals each)

== Teams ==
At the end of the previous season Odred Ljubljana and Rabotnički were relegated from top level. They were replaced by NK Zagreb and Željezničar.

Team	Location	Federal Republic	Position in 1953–54
BSK Belgrade	Belgrade	Serbia	8th
Dinamo Zagreb	Zagreb	Croatia	1st
Hajduk Split	Split	Croatia	4th
Lokomotiva	Zagreb	Croatia	11th
Partizan	Belgrade	Serbia	2nd
Proleter Osijek	Osijek	Croatia	10th
Radnički Belgrade	Belgrade	Serbia	12th
Red Star	Belgrade	Serbia	3rd
FK Sarajevo	Sarajevo	Bosnia and Herzegovina	7th
Spartak Subotica	Subotica	Serbia	6th
Vardar	Skopje	Macedonia	9th
Vojvodina	Novi Sad	Serbia	5th
NK Zagreb	Zagreb	Croatia	—
Željezničar	Sarajevo	Bosnia and Herzegovina	—

== League table ==
Pos	Team	Pld	W	D	L	GF	GA	GR	Pts	Qualification or relegation
1	Hajduk Split (C)	26	16	6	4	69	27	2.556	38	
2	BSK	26	15	6	5	61	43	1.419	36	
3	Dinamo Zagreb	26	14	6	6	54	49	1.102	34	
4	Red Star	26	14	5	7	57	36	1.583	33	
5	Partizan	26	12	6	8	58	36	1.611	30	Qualification for the European Cup first round
6	Vojvodina	26	10	9	7	48	36	1.333	29	
7	Sarajevo	26	11	6	9	50	36	1.389	28	
8	Spartak Subotica	26	10	5	11	54	57	0.947	25	
9	NK Zagreb	26	9	6	11	34	44	0.773	24	
10	Radnički Beograd	26	9	4	13	34	42	0.810	22	
11	Željezničar	26	8	3	15	34	52	0.654	19	
12	Proleter Osijek	26	6	7	13	29	51	0.569	19	
13	Vardar (R)	26	5	8	13	24	41	0.585	18	Relegation to Yugoslav Second League
14	Lokomotiva (R)	26	3	3	20	25	81	0.309	9	Relegation to Yugoslav Second League

Source: rsssf.org
Rules for classification: 1st points; 2nd goal average
(C) Champions; (R) Relegated

== Results ==
Home \ Away	BSK	DIN	HAJ	LOK	PAR	PRO	RBE	RSB	SAR	SPA	VAR	VOJ	ZAG	ŽEL
BSK Belgrade		3–5	0–0	2–1	1–1	3–1	0–1	2–1	3–1	4–3	0–2	2–2	5–2	1–0
Dinamo Zagreb	3–3		0–6	3–3	4–3	1–1	2–1	2–3	2–2	3–1	3–0	3–1	2–2	2–1
Hajduk Split	6–2	1–1		7–0	2–1	5–3	5–1	4–1	0–1	4–1	6–0	2–1	4–0	1–0
Lokomotiva	1–5	0–1	1–3		0–3	1–1	2–0	0–4	1–2	4–5	1–0	0–4	1–1	0–1
Partizan	0–3	3–2	0–1	2–3		2–2	7–0	1–4	3–0	5–0	3–0	0–0	1–3	3–1
Proleter Osijek	1–2	1–2	0–0	3–2	2–5		1–0	3–5	0–0	0–5	0–1	1–2	1–0	2–0
Radnički Beograd	2–2	1–2	0–1	4–0	2–3	3–4		0–0	3–1	2–0	2–1	0–0	1–0	1–1
Red Star	1–3	2–0	2–2	4–0	2–1	3–1	2–0		1–3	2–0	3–1	2–2	1–1	6–1
Sarajevo	0–2	2–0	3–1	8–0	1–3	5–0	1–0	2–0		2–2	0–0	1–3	3–1	2–3
Spartak Subotica	2–2	4–1	4–3	6–1	0–3	0–1	0–1	2–0	1–1		1–1	0–3	2–1	4–1
Vardar	2–4	1–2	1–2	3–0	0–0	2–0	0–2	0–0	1–1	2–2		2–2	0–0	1–0
Vojvodina	4–2	0–1	1–1	4–1	1–1	1–1	2–5	3–2	3–1	6–3	2–1		0–1	0–0
NK Zagreb	1–3	1–2	0–0	2–0	1–1	1–0	2–1	2–4	2–1	2–3	3–1	2–1		2–1
Željezničar	0–2	3–5	3–2	3–1	1–3	0–0	2–1	1–2	1–6	2–3	2–1	1–0	5–1	

Source: DataSoccer.it
Legend: Blue = home team win; Yellow = draw; Red = away team win.

== Winning squad ==
Champions:

- Hajduk Split (coach: Aleksandar Tomašević)

players (league matches/league goals):

- Davor Grčić (26 apps; 1 goal)
- Slavko Luštica (26 apps; 1 goal)
- Bernard Vukas (26 apps; 20 goals)
- Joško Vidošević (26 apps; 18 goals)
- Ljubomir Kokeza (25 apps)
- Sulejman Rebac (23 apps; 9 goals)
- Vladimir Šenauer (22 apps; 7 goals)
- Frane Matošić (21 apps; 8 goals)
- Vladimir Beara (20 apps)
- Božo Broketa (20 apps; 1 goal)
- Lenko Grčić (20 apps)
- Nikola Radović (20 apps; 1 goal)
- Ante Vulić (6 apps)
- Bogdan Kragić (3 apps; 3 goals)
- Davor Benčić (1 app)
- Leo Dadić (1 app)

== Top scorers ==
Rank	Player	Club	Goals
1	(Socialist Federal Republic of Yugoslavia) Predrag Marković	BSK Belgrade	20
1	(Socialist Federal Republic of Yugoslavia) Kosta Tomašević	Spartak Subotica	20
1	(Socialist Federal Republic of Yugoslavia) Bernard Vukas	Hajduk Split	20
4	(Socialist Federal Republic of Yugoslavia) Joško Vidošević	Hajduk Split	18
5	(Socialist Federal Republic of Yugoslavia) Stjepan Bobek	Partizan	16
6	(Socialist Federal Republic of Yugoslavia) Tihomir Ognjanov	Spartak Subotica	15
6	(Socialist Federal Republic of Yugoslavia) Aleksandar Benko	Dinamo Zagreb	15
8	(Socialist Federal Republic of Yugoslavia) Todor Veselinović	Vojvodina	14
8	(Socialist Federal Republic of Yugoslavia) Ilijas Pašić	Željezničar	14
8	(Socialist Federal Republic of Yugoslavia) Ivan Toplak	Red Star	14

== See also ==
- 1954–55 Yugoslav Second League
- 1954 Yugoslav Cup
