= Sulejman Rebac =

Bosnian footballer (1929–2006)

Personal information
- Date of birth: 29 March 1929
- Place of birth: Mostar, Kingdom of Yugoslavia
- Date of death: 17 November 2006 (aged 77)
- Place of death: Mostar, Bosnia and Herzegovina
- Position: Striker

Senior career*
Years	Team	Apps	(Gls)
1947–1954	Velež Mostar	404	(302)
1954–1957	Hajduk Split	72	(30)
1957–1958	Sarajevo	28	(19)
Total		504	(351)

International career
1956	PR Croatia	1	(2)

Managerial career
- 1968–1976: Velež Mostar
- 1973–1974: Yugoslavia
- 1977–1978: Željezničar
- * Club domestic league appearances and goals

Sulejman "Sula" Rebac (29 March 1929 – 17 November 2006) was a Bosnian football player and manager.

== Club career ==
Rebac started playing football at FK Velež Mostar in 1947. In 1954, he moved to HNK Hajduk Split where he stayed for several seasons. He also played one season for FK Sarajevo. In total, he played more than 1000 games, scoring 620 goals. He is considered to be one of the most celebrated football players in history of Velež and Bosnia and Herzegovina.

== International career ==
In 1956, Rebac made one appearance for the Croatia national team against Indonesia, in which he scored two goals.

== Managerial career ==
After retirement, he began his coaching career. He started in 1963 as a coach of Velež Mostar. Although they had never won a title, Velež Mostar was among the top Yugoslav clubs at the time. Players like Dušan Bajević, Enver Marić, Franjo Vladić (the 'BMV' trio), Džemal Hadžiabdić, Vahid Halilhodžić, Aleksandar Ristić, Boro Primorac, Vladimir Pecelj, Momčilo Vukoje, Ahmed Glavović, Dubravko Ledić, Jadranko Topić, Marijan Kvesić, Marko Čolić and Slobodan Mrgan all made their names under the guidance of Sulejman Rebac. In the 1977–78 season, he was a coach of FK Željezničar Sarajevo.

In December 1973, he was appointed to a coaching commission, alongside Miljan Miljanić, Milan Ribar, Tomislav Ivić and Milovan Ćirić, created to lead the Yugoslavia national team. As a part of it, he was present at the 1974 FIFA World Cup.

== Death ==
Rebac died on 17 November 2006 in Mostar.

== Honours ==
=== Player ===
Velež Mostar

- Yugoslav Second League: 1952

Hajduk Split

- Yugoslav First League: 1954–55

=== Manager ===
Željezničar

- Yugoslav Second League: 1977–78 (West)
