= Ivica Miljković =

Croatian footballer

Personal information
- Date of birth: 1 August 1947
- Place of birth: Slavonski Brod, FPR Yugoslavia
- Date of death: 23 September 2005 (aged 58)
- Position: Defender

Senior career*
Years	Team	Apps	(Gls)
1969–1977	Dinamo Zagreb	232	(24)
1977–1980	Osijek	95	(2)
1980–1981	Chicago Sting	35	(2)
Total		362	(28)

International career
1975	Yugoslavia	1	(0)
- * Club domestic league appearances and goals

Ivica Miljković (1 August 1947 in Slavonski Brod – 23 September 2005) was a former Croatian football player.

== Club career ==
Miljković made a name for himself playing for Dinamo Zagreb and in the period from 1969 to 1977 he appeared in a total of 232 Yugoslav First League matches, scoring 24 goals for the Blues. In 1977, he moved to NK Osijek where he spent the following three seasons. In 1980, he went abroad and spent the last two years of his career at NASL side Chicago Sting, helping them win the 1981 NASL championship.

== International career ==
He was capped once for Yugoslavia, in a Euro 1976 qualifier against Northern Ireland held on 16 March 1975 at Windsor Park in which he came on late for Jure Jerković.
