= Ivica Senzen =

Croatian footballer

Personal information
- Full name: Ivan Senzen
- Date of birth: 4 May 1951 (age 75)
- Place of birth: Sisak, SFR Yugoslavia
- Position: Forward

Youth career
- 1967–1970: Metalac Sisak

Senior career*
Years	Team	Apps	(Gls)
1970–1979	Dinamo Zagreb	206	(29)
1979–1982	1860 Munich	82	(8)
1982–1986	Austria Klagenfurt		
1986–1988	Jugokeramika Zaprešić		
1988–1990	Radnik Velika Gorica		
- * Club domestic league appearances and goals

Ivan "Ivica" Senzen (born 4 May 1951 in Sisak) is a Croatian retired footballer.

== Playing career ==
After beginning his career at his hometown club Metalac Sisak, Senzen was picked up by Dinamo Zagreb in 1970. Senzen spent the next nine years playing for the club, and had appeared in a total of 447 matches and scored 103 goals for the club (206 appearances and 29 goals in the Yugoslav First League), in a generation that featured other notable players such as Drago Vabec, Zlatko Kranjčar, and Velimir Zajec.

In 1979, he moved to Germany where he spent three seasons playing for 1860 Munich, and scored 8 goals in 82 appearances for the German side. He then moved on to Austria Klagenfurt, where he played between 1982 and 1986, before returning to Croatia and spending two years with Jugokeramika (later known as Inter Zaprešić) and then two years with Radnik Velika Gorica, before retiring in 1990.

== Managerial career ==
After retiring from active football, Senzen turned to managing and coaching. He first worked at Radnik's youth academy for a year, before taking over as club's manager and winning promotion to Prva HNL in 1991. Between 1991 and 1999 he managed several Croatian clubs, before coming to Dinamo Zagreb in 1999 as assistant manager to Ilija Lončarević. Dinamo won the championship title that season, and Senzen stayed at the club working at Dinamo's academy.

He worked as a coach of the youngest age group at the Dinamo academy, the Zagići II (under-8 team) and occasionally does scouting for the club, bringing in youth players to Dinamo.

In September 2015 he was named manager of NK Lukavac and took the reins at HNK Tigar Rakitje in September 2017.

== Personal life ==
As of 2020, his son Ivica Senzen jr. also works at Dinamo as a youth coach.
