= Rajko Vujadinović =

Montenegrin footballer

Personal information
- Full name: Rajko Vujadinović
- Date of birth: 13 April 1956 (age 70)
- Place of birth: Nikšić, SFR Yugoslavia
- Height: 1.89 m (6 ft 2 1/2 in)
- Position: Forward

Senior career*
Years	Team	Apps	(Gls)
1975–1977	Sutjeska Nikšić	46	(21)
1977–1980	Dinamo Zagreb	26	(3)
1979	→ Vojvodina (loan)	1	(1)
1980–1984	Vojvodina	83	(15)
1984–1985	Doxa Drama	16	(3)
1985–1988	Panachaiki	80	(20)
Total		252	(63)
- * Club domestic league appearances and goals

Rajko Vujadinović (Serbian Cyrillic: Рајко Вујадиновић; born 13 April 1956) is a retired Montenegrin footballer who played as a forward for clubs in Yugoslavia and Greece.

== Playing career ==
Born in Nikšić, Vujadinović began playing football for FK Sutjeska Nikšić before moving to NK Dinamo Zagreb in the Yugoslav First League. He joined FK Vojvodina in early 1979, and would appear in 84 league matches in six seasons with the club.

In 1984, Vujadinović joined Super League Greece side Doxa Drama for one season. He moved to fellow Super League club Panachaiki for the following three seasons.
