= 1952 Yugoslav Second League =

Yugoslav Second League
- Season: 1952
- Champions: None

The 1952 Yugoslav Second League season would be the 6th season of the Second Federal League (Serbo-Croatian: Druga savezna liga), the second level association football competition of SFR Yugoslavia, since its establishment in 1946. It was cancelled before the start of the competition and the clubs were relocated to third level.

== Teams ==
A total of twelve teams were supposed to contest the league, including nine sides from the 1951 season, two clubs relegated from the 1951 Yugoslav First League and one side promoted from the third-tier leagues played in the 1951 season.

Spartak Subotica and Napredak Kruševac were relegated from the 1951 Yugoslav First League after finishing in the 11th and 12th place of the league table. Rudar Trbovlje and Sloga Rankovićevo secured their status after additional play-off.

Locations of teams' home cities in the 1952 Yugoslav Second League

Team	Location	Federal subject	Position in 1950
Budućnost	Titograd	SR Montenegro	3rd
Dinamo Pančevo	Pančevo	(Socialist Republic of Serbia) SAP Vojvodina	9th
Kvarner	Rijeka	SR Croatia	10th
Metalac Zagreb	Zagreb	SR Croatia	6th
Napredak	Kruševac	SR Serbia	—
Odred Ljubljana	Ljubljana	SR Slovenia	8th
Proleter Osijek	Osijek	SR Croatia	7th
Radnički Belgrade	Belgrade	SR Serbia	5th
Rudar Trbovlje	Trbovlje	SR Slovenia	14th
Sloga	Rankovićevo	SR Serbia	—
Spartak	Subotica	(Socialist Republic of Serbia) SAP Vojvodina	—
Velež	Mostar	SR Bosnia and Herzegovina	4th

== Play-off ==
Pos	Team	Pld	W	D	L	GF	GA	GD	Pts	Promotion
1	Rudar Trbovlje	4	2	1	1	10	7	+3	5	Promotion to Yugoslav Second League
2	Šibenik	4	2	1	1	11	9	+2	5	
3	Bokelj	4	0	2	2	5	10	−5	2	

Rules for classification: 1) points; 2) goal difference; 3) number of goals scored.

Pos	Team	Pld	W	D	L	GF	GA	GD	Pts	Promotion
1	Sloga Rankovićevo	4	2	0	2	12	6	+6	4	Promotion to Yugoslav Second League
2	Borac Banja Luka	4	2	0	2	10	8	+2	4	
3	FK Rabotnik	4	2	0	2	2	10	−8	4	

Rules for classification: 1) points; 2) goal difference; 3) number of goals scored.

== See also ==
- 1952 Yugoslav First League
- 1952 Yugoslav Cup
