= Joško Vidošević =

Croatian footballer

Personal information
- Date of birth: 11 January 1935
- Place of birth: Split, Kingdom of Yugoslavia
- Date of death: 10 August 1990 (aged 55)
- Place of death: Split, SFR Yugoslavia
- Height: 1.85 m (6 ft 1 in)
- Position: Forward

Youth career
- 1949–1952: Hajduk Split

Senior career*
Years	Team	Apps	(Gls)
1952–1962	Hajduk Split	143	(63)
1963	RNK Split		
1964	Lugano		

International career
1955	Yugoslavia	3	(0)
1956	PR Croatia	1	(0)
Medal record
Representing Yugoslavia
Men's Football
Silver medal – second place	1956 Melbourne	Team
- * Club domestic league appearances and goals

Joško Vidošević (11 January 1935 – 10 August 1990), nicknamed Jole, was a Croatian footballer who played for both Yugoslavia and Croatia at international level.

== Club career ==
A native of Split, Vidošević joined the local side Hajduk Split as a youngster in 1949 and debuted for the first team squad in 1952. He went on to spend the next 10 years with the club, appearing in a total of 349 games and scoring a whopping 228 goals (including 143 appearances and 63 goals in the Yugoslav First League). During his time at Hajduk he also helped the club win the 1952 and 1954–55 national championships.

In 1962 he left the club and had brief stints with local rivals RNK Split in 1963 and at Swiss side Lugano in 1964, when he retired from active football due to illness. He later worked in Hajduk's club management and served as chairman of Hajduk between June 1985 and November 1986.

== International career ==
Vidošević was capped for Yugoslavia three times in 1955 and was a member of the squad which won silver medal at the 1956 Summer Olympics in Melbourne. He also appeared for PR Croatia in an unofficial friendly against Indonesia held in Zagreb on 12 September 1956.

Preceded by Ante Kovač	President of Hajduk Split; June 1985 – November 1986	Succeeded by Vlado Bučević
