= Vilson Džoni =

Croatian footballer (born 1950)

Personal information
- Date of birth: 24 September 1950 (age 76)
- Place of birth: Split, PR Croatia, FPR Yugoslavia
- Height: 1.77 m (5 ft 10 in)
- Position: Full-back

Senior career*
Years	Team	Apps	(Gls)
1968–1978	Hajduk Split	207	(8)
1978–1979	Dinamo Zagreb	30	(11)
1979–1981	Schalke 04	55	(7)
1982–1986	Wattenscheid 09	130	(19)

International career
1974–1978	Yugoslavia	4	(0)
- * Club domestic league appearances and goals

Vilson Džoni (Albanian: Vilson Xhoni; born 24 September 1950) is a Croatian former professional footballer who played as a defender. He was named Yugoslav Footballer of the Year in 1978.

== Club career ==
Džoni was born in Split to a family from Prizren, and is of Kosovo Albanian descent. He was a full back whose biggest weapon was his speed. At club level, he spent ten years at Hajduk Split playing a total of 207 league games. He then moved to Dinamo Zagreb, where he spent just one year before moving to Schalke 04.

== International career ==
Džoni made his debut for Yugoslavia in a September 1974 friendly match against Italy and earned a total of four caps. His final international was a November 1978 Balkan Cup match against Greece.

== Post-playing career ==
Džoni worked as a scout within Croatian First League's Hajduk Split until he retired in 2015.
