= Stjepan Deverić =

Yugoslav-Croatian footballer and manager

Personal information
- Full name: Stjepan Deverić
- Date of birth: 20 August 1961 (age 65)
- Place of birth: Velika Gorica, PR Croatia, Yugoslavia
- Height: 1.78 m (5 ft 10 in)
- Position: Striker

Senior career*
Years	Team	Apps	(Gls)
1979–1984	Dinamo Zagreb	102	(27)
1984–1987	Hajduk Split	68	(28)
1987–1991	Dinamo Zagreb	45	(8)
1991–1993	Sturm Graz	36	(13)
1993–1994	Lebring		

International career
1982–1984	Yugoslavia	6	(0)

Managerial career
- Zagorec Krapina
- Segesta
- -2000: Marsonia
- 2003–2004: Zrinjski Mostar
- 2008: Belasitsa Petrich
- 2018-2019: OFK Titograd (assistant)
- 2021: Lomnica
Medal record
Men's Football
Representing Yugoslavia
Olympic Games
Bronze medal – third place	1984 Los Angeles	Team
- * Club domestic league appearances and goals

Stjepan "Štef" Deverić (born 20 August 1961) is a Croatian retired professional footballer and former football manager.

== Club career ==
Deverić began his career with Dinamo Zagreb in the Yugoslav First League in 1979. He stayed at the club until 1984, playing in 345 games and scoring 158 goals before moving to Croatian rival Hajduk Split where he stayed from 1984 until 1987 playing in 114 games and scoring 42 goals. He later returned to Dinamo (1987–90). After Croatian independence, he played abroad in Austria with Sturm Graz (1991–92) and Lebring (1993–94).

== International career ==
Internationally, Deverić was part of Yugoslavia's 1982 FIFA World Cup, but did not play. He was also a member of the squad which won bronze at the 1984 Olympics, as well as the Yugoslav squad at the 1984 UEFA European Football Championship. For Yugoslavia he played in 6 games. Deverić scored 5 goals at the 1984 Summer Olympics and was a joint Top Scorer with Boro Cvetković.

== Managerial career ==
Deverić has also managed. He formerly managed Zagorec Krapina, Segesta, Marsonia, Zrinjski Mostar, Belasitsa Petrich and was a youth coach in Hitrec - Kacian (Dinamo Zagreb youth football school). He also worked as an assistant to manager Igor Pamić at OFK Titograd and took charge at lower league side Lomnica in March 2021.

== Honours ==
=== Player ===
Dinamo Zagreb

- Yugoslav First League: 1981–82
- Yugoslav Cup: 1979–80, 1982–83

Hajduk Split

- Yugoslav Cup: 1986–87

Yugoslavia

- Summer Olympics third place: 1984
