= Drago Vabec =

Croatian footballer (born 1950)

Personal information
- Full name: Dragutin Vabec
- Date of birth: 26 October 1950 (age 76)
- Place of birth: Zagreb, PR Croatia, FPR Yugoslavia
- Height: 1.73 m (5 ft 8 in)
- Position: Left winger

Senior career*
Years	Team	Apps	(Gls)
1968–1977	Dinamo Zagreb	230	(45)
1977	Toronto Metros-Croatia	15	(11)
1977–1979	Dinamo Zagreb	28	(10)
1979–1983	Brest	118	(60)
1983–1984	Dinamo Zagreb	7	(1)
Total		398	(127)

International career
1973–1976	Yugoslavia	7	(1)

Managerial career
- 2006–2007: Čakovec
- 2012–2013: Sloga Čakovec
- 2013–: Strahoninec
- * Club domestic league appearances and goals

Dragutin "Drago" Vabec (born 26 October 1950) is a Croatian former professional footballer who played for Dinamo Zagreb, Stade Brestois and Toronto Metros-Croatia. He is considered one of the best players in Dinamo Zagreb history and the best player in Stade Brestois history. He left Brest in 1983. At international level, he represented the SFR Yugoslavia national team.

His family originates from Čakovec, Međimurje County, and he spent most of his time there.

== Playing career ==
Vabec was born in Zagreb, SFR Yugoslavia.

He made his debut for Yugoslavia in a September 1973 friendly match against Hungary and earned a total of seven caps, scoring one goal. His final international was an April 1976 European Championship qualification match against Wales. While playing for Yugoslavia during a match against Sweden on 10 October 1975 he scored a fantastic goal, which was for years screened at the beginning of the sports program.

== Style of play ==
Although Vabec played mostly as a left winger, he was an excellent right winger too and could also play at a high level as a midfielder or a defender. The football experts deem him the most versatile player in Dinamo's history. Vabec was described as a highly intelligent player, with superb technique and passing skills, and equally adept with both feet.

== Managerial career ==
In October 2006, he was appointed head coach at relegation-threatened Croatian second division side NK Čakovec. He remained at the position until the end of the season, but failed to save the club from relegation.
