= Srećko Bogdan =

Croatian footballer (1957–2026)

Personal information
- Date of birth: 5 January 1957
- Place of birth: Mursko Središće, PR Croatia, FPR Yugoslavia
- Date of death: 8 April 2026 (aged 69)
- Place of death: Zagreb, Croatia
- Height: 1.83 m (6 ft 0 in)
- Position: Defender

Youth career
- 1970–1973: Rudar Mursko Središće
- 1973–1974: Čakovec

Senior career*
Years	Team	Apps	(Gls)
1974–1985	Dinamo Zagreb	262	(34)
1985–1993	Karlsruher SC	245	(21)
Total		507	(55)

International career
1977–1983	Yugoslavia	11	(0)
1990–1991	Croatia	2	(1)

Managerial career
- 2001–2002: VfR Mannheim
- 2005–2006: Inter Zaprešić
- 2007–2008: Segesta
- 2009–2010: Međimurje
- 2010–2011: Savski Marof
Medal record
Men's Football
Representing Yugoslavia
Mediterranean Games
Gold medal – first place	UEFA U-21 Euro	1978
Gold medal – first place	1979 Split	Team
- * Club domestic league appearances and goals

Srećko Bogdan (5 January 1957 – 8 April 2026) was a Croatian professional footballer who played as a defender.

== Club career ==
Bogdan was born in Mursko Središće, Croatia, FPR Yugoslavia. He started his career in his home town with Rudar Mursko Središće, where he spent three years before moving to Čakovec and starting his senior career in 1973. He spent one season and a half with Čakovec before transferring first to Dinamo Zagreb. He is in third place in Dinamo Zagreb's all-time list of appearances for the club, with a total of 595 appearances in which he scored 125 goals. He played for Dinamo Zagreb between January 1975 and June 1985, after which he moved to Karlsruher SC in the 2. Bundesliga. After two years at Karlsruhe, he managed promotion to the Bundesliga with the club and subsequently made 169 appearances for the club in the league over the following six seasons, scoring nine goals. He retired from playing in June 1993.

== International career ==
In his international career, Bogdan played for both former Yugoslavia and Croatia, and won 11 caps for Yugoslavia and two for Croatia, scoring one goal for the latter. He made his debut for Yugoslavia in a January 1977 friendly match away against Colombia, coming on as a 30th-minute substitute for Franjo Vladić. The games for Croatia in 1990 and 1991 were unofficial, since the country was still officially part of Yugoslavia.

== Managerial career ==
Bogdan worked as a coach at Karlsruher SC's youth academy between 1993 and 1996, following his retirement as a player at the club. He went on to work as an assistant coach at the club's first team between 1996 and 2001.

The first club where he was appointed head coach was Croatian side Inter Zaprešić, where he was in charge in 2005 and 2006. He was then appointed head coach at Segesta Sisak in January 2007, staying with the club until October 2008. In October 2009, he was appointed head coach at Međimurje, signing a contract until the end of the 2009–10 season. He was sacked on 2 April 2010, when the club found themselves on the brink of the relegation zone after a streak of five games without a win. He later managed Savski Marof and became academy boss at Inter Zaprešić.

== Other work ==
During the 2006 FIFA World Cup, Bogdan commented on several of the tournament's matches as a co-commentator for the Croatian Radiotelevision (HRT).

== Death ==
Bogdan died on 8 April 2026, at the age of 69.
