= Borislav Cvetković =

Croatian footballer and manager

Personal information
- Full name: Borislav Cvetković
- Date of birth: 30 September 1962 (age 64)
- Place of birth: Karlovac, SR Croatia, SFR Yugoslavia
- Height: 1.80 m (5 ft 11 in)
- Position: Forward

Senior career*
| Years | Team | Apps | (Gls) |
| 1980–1986 | Dinamo Zagreb | 151 | (44) |
| 1986–1988 | Red Star Belgrade | 63 | (22) |
| 1988–1991 | Ascoli | 84 | (20) |
| 1992–1993 | Maceratese | 26 | (8) |
| 1993–1994 | Casertana | 19 | (6) |
| 1994–1995 | Borac Čačak | 7 | (1) |
| Total | | 350 | (101) |

International career
| 1983–1988 | Yugoslavia | 11 | (1) |

Managerial career
- 2003-2004: Obilić
- 2005–2006: Red Star Belgrade (assistant)
- Sopot
Medal record
Representing Yugoslavia
Men's Football
| Bronze medal – third place | 1984 Los Angeles | Team competition |
- * Club domestic league appearances and goals

Borislav Cvetković (born 30 September 1962) is a Serbian football manager and retired player. He was nicknamed "Lane sa Korane" (Doe of Korana), by legendary sports commentator Ivan Tomić, while playing for Dinamo. When he moved to Belgrade, Tomić just switched his nickname to "Lane sa Marakane" (Doe of Marakana), as Red Star Belgrade stadium is colloquially known.

== Playing career ==
=== Club ===
During his club career he played for Dinamo Zagreb, Red Star Belgrade, Ascoli, Maceratese, Casertana and Borac Čačak.

=== International ===
He made his debut for Yugoslavia in a June 1983 friendly match against Romania, coming on as a 30th-minute substitute for Miloš Šestić, and earned a total of 11 caps, scoring 1 goal. He participated in UEFA Euro 1984. His final international was a November 1988 World Cup qualification match against France.

== Coaching career ==
Cvetković coached FK Sopot, an expositure of Cvetković's former club Red Star Belgrade. He also coached Obilić in one short term, he worked also as assistant to Dragan Okuka in the Serbia U21 side.

== Personal life ==
Boro is the younger brother of the late Zvjezdan Cvetković, who was playing for Dinamo Zagreb during the 1980s, even longer than Boro, and was later an assistant coach and coach in the same club, as well as the coach of Borac Banja Luka.
