= Marko Mlinarić =

Croatian footballer

Personal information
- Full name: Marko Mlinarić
- Date of birth: 1 September 1960 (age 66)
- Place of birth: Zagreb, FPR Yugoslavia
- Height: 1.76 m (5 ft 9 in)
- Position: Midfielder

Senior career*
Years	Team	Apps	(Gls)
1978–1987	Dinamo Zagreb	231	(38)
1987–1989	Auxerre	47	(6)
1989–1991	Cannes	48	(5)
1991–1994	Segesta	56	(6)
1995–1996	Dinamo Zagreb	34	(3)
Total		412	(58)

International career
1979	Yugoslavia U20	3	(1)
1983–1988	Yugoslavia	17	(1)
1990	Croatia	1	(0)
- * Club domestic league appearances and goals

Marko Mlinarić (born 1 September 1960) is a Croatian retired footballer who played as a midfielder. Nicknamed Mlinka, he was part of the Dinamo Zagreb squad that won the 1981–82 Yugoslav First League. He made his debut for them against Osijek on 8 April 1978 and played a total of 530 matches for them, official and unofficial. In 1987 he was named the Yugoslav Footballer of the Year.

== International career ==
He made his debut for Yugoslavia in an April 1983 friendly match away against France, coming on as a 46th-minute substitute for Mehmed Baždarević, and earned a total of 17 caps, scoring 1 goal. According to Mlinarić, he disqualified himself for the 1984 European Football Championships because he chose to do his military service that year. His final international was a September 1988 friendly away against Spain. He also played one unofficial game for Croatia, an October 1990 friendly match against the United States, but Croatia was still part of Yugoslavia at the time.

== Honours ==
Dinamo Zagreb

- Yugoslav First League: 1

1982

- Croatian First League: 1

1996

- Yugoslav Cup: 2

1980, 1983

- Croatian Cup: 1

1996
