= Velimir Zajec =

Croatian footballer (born 1956)

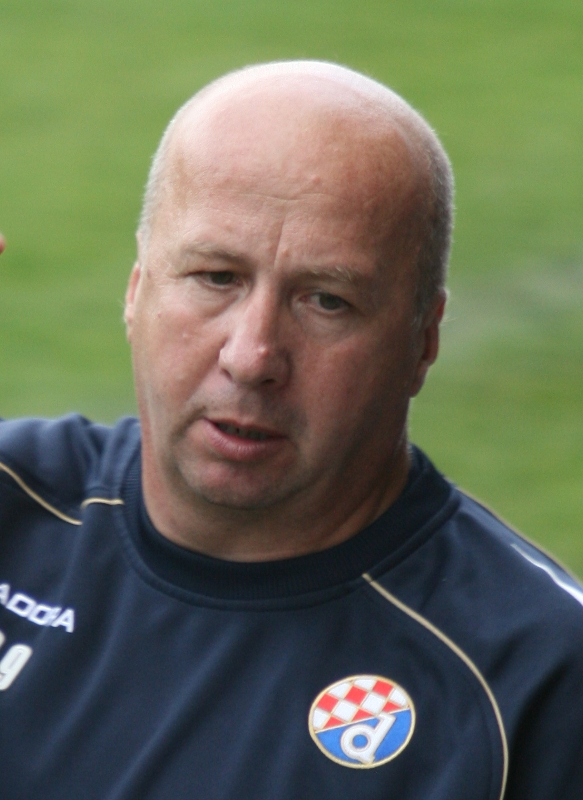
- Zajec with Dinamo Zagreb in 2010

President of Dinamo Zagreb
- In office 10 March 2024 – 16 September 2025
- Preceded by: Mirko Barišić
- Succeeded by: Zvonimir Boban

Personal details
- Born: 12 February 1956 (age 70) Zagreb, PR Croatia, Yugoslavia
- Height: 1.78 m (5 ft 10 in)
- Spouse(s): Dubravka Zajec (died 1989) Angela Keros
- Children: 5
- Occupation: Footballer; Football manager Football administrator
Association football career
- Positions: Defender; midfielder
Youth career
- Dinamo Zagreb
Senior career*
Years	Team	Apps	(Gls)
1974–1984	Dinamo Zagreb	238	(13)
1984–1988	Panathinaikos	67	(11)
Total		305	(24)
International career
1977–1985	Yugoslavia	36	(1)
Managerial career
- 1996–1997: Panathinaikos
- 1998–1999: Dinamo Zagreb
- 2004–2005: Portsmouth
- 2010: Dinamo Zagreb
Medal record
Men's football
Representing Yugoslavia
Gold medal – first place	UEFA U-21 Euro	1978
- * Club domestic league appearances and goals

Velimir Zajec (born 12 February 1956) is a Croatian professional football manager and former player who is also the former president of Dinamo Zagreb.

== Club career ==
Zajec began his career at Dinamo Zagreb in 1974, aged 18. In ten years at the club, he helped them to two domestic cup wins, as well as the league title, their first title honour in 24 years. In 1979 and 1984, he was named the Yugoslav Footballer of the Year.

He then transferred to Greek club Panathinaikos, where he played over 100 games.

== International career ==
Zajec made his debut for Yugoslavia in a March 1977 friendly match against the Soviet Union and earned a total of 36 caps, scoring 1 goal. He captained them at both the 1982 World Cup and the 1984 European Championship. His final international was an October 1985 friendly away against Austria.

== Coaching career ==
Following retirement, Zajec spent two years (1989–1991) as Director of Football at former club Dinamo Zagreb before returning to Panathinaikos to run their academy. Before long, he was promoted to head coach of the club. After a period he again, he returned to Zagreb, this time as head coach, before moving once more back to Panathinaikos in 2002 to become Director of Football.

In late October 1998, Zajec replaced Zlatko Kranjčar as manager at Dinamo Zagreb (then known as Croatia Zagreb), following Kranjčar's poor record in the UEFA Champions League group stage, where the team only managed to grab a single point in three matches (drawing with Ajax at home, before losing to both Olympiacos and Porto on the road). The team's performance in the UEFA Champions League improved under Zajec, as they managed to stay undefeated in the remaining three group matches, beating Porto and Ajax and drawing with Olympiacos. Dinamo nevertheless did not manage to go through to the quarter-finals after finishing second in their group, behind Olympiacos (at the time, only the first-place finishers and the two best second-place finishers went through).

In 2004, Zajec moved to English club Portsmouth to take up a position as executive director. He took over as temporary team manager following the resignation of Harry Redknapp in November 2004 and was confirmed as the new manager on 21 December 2004 making him the first Croatian to manage in the Premier league. Five months later, he reverted to his intended director's role, following the arrival of Alain Perrin. He resigned from his position at Fratton Park on 10 October 2005 for personal reasons.

On 25 May 2010, Zajec was appointed new coach at Dinamo Zagreb, returning to the club as coach after 11 years. However, Zajec was sacked on 9 August 2010, after leading Dinamo in just 8 competitive matches, winning the 2010 Croatian Supercup, exiting the 2010–11 Champions League in the third qualifying round, and picking up four points in the first three matches in the 2010–11 Prva HNL.

On 8 February 2024, Zajec became the holder of the election list "Dinamovo proljeće" and therefore a candidate for Dinamo Zagreb's president.

== Honours ==
Dinamo Zagreb

- Yugoslav First League: 1982
- Yugoslav Cup: 1980, 1983

Panathinaikos

- Alpha Ethniki: 1986
- Greek Cup: 1986, 1988
