= 1975–76 FK Partizan season =

Partizan
1975–76 season
- President: Nikola Lekić
- Head coach: Tomislav Kaloperović
- Yugoslav First League: Winners
- Yugoslav Cup: First round
- Top goalscorer: League: All: Nenad Bjeković
- Average home league attendance: 22,647

The 1975–76 season was the 30th season in FK Partizan's existence. This article shows player statistics and matches that the club played during the 1975–76 season.

== Players ==
=== Squad information ===
(league matches/league goals)

Momčilo Vukotić (33/7)
Rešad Kunovac (33/0)
Borislav Đurović (32/1)
Radmilo Ivančević (32/0)
Nenad Bjeković (31/24)
Ilija Zavišić (31/6)
Refik Kozić (30/0)
Ivan Golac (26/0)
Aranđel Todorović (25/2)
Boško Đorđević (23/5)
Predrag Tomić (23/1)
Vukan Perović (19/7)
Vladimir Pejović (19/0)
Dragan Arsenović (16/1)
Svemir Đorđić (14/1)
Nenad Stojković (14/0)
Pavle Grubješić (12/3)
Aco Trifunović (8/0)
Radomir Antić (7/1)
Blagoj Istatov (3/0)
Simo Nikolić (3/0)
Dževad Prekazi (3/0)
Nenad Cvetković (1/0)

== Friendlies ==
9 August 1975 Friendly	Partizan (Socialist Federal Republic of Yugoslavia)	2–1	(Socialist Federal Republic of Yugoslavia) Crvena zvezda	Belgrade
	Bjeković 23'; Cvetković 48'			Stadium: Stadion JNA; Attendance: 40,000; Referee: Radmilo Ristić (Beograd)

15 November 1975 Friendly	FCM Reșița (Romania)	3–3	(Socialist Federal Republic of Yugoslavia) Partizan	Reșița, Romania

18 December 1975 Friendly	Partizan (Socialist Federal Republic of Yugoslavia)	3–1	(Switzerland) Servette	Tlemcen, Algeria

21 December 1975 Friendly	Algeria	1–5	(Socialist Federal Republic of Yugoslavia) Partizan	Oran, Algeria

4 February 1976 Friendly	Istra (Socialist Federal Republic of Yugoslavia)	0–2	(Socialist Federal Republic of Yugoslavia) Partizan	Pula
			Zavišić 30'; Marić 51' (o.g.)

10 February 1976 Friendly	Hajduk Split (Socialist Federal Republic of Yugoslavia)	4–2	(Socialist Federal Republic of Yugoslavia) Partizan	Split
			Perović; Vukotić	Stadium: Stadion Stari plac Attendance: 18,000

11 February 1976 Friendly	Soviet Union	2–1	(Socialist Federal Republic of Yugoslavia) Partizan	Split
			Bjeković	Stadium: Stadion Stari plac

14 February 1976 Friendly	Zadar (Socialist Federal Republic of Yugoslavia)	0–5	(Socialist Federal Republic of Yugoslavia) Partizan	Zadar
			Todorović 5'; Đorđević 20', 70'; Zavišić 30'; Đorđić 88'	Attendance: 1,500; Referee: N. Đurović (Zadar)

18 February 1976 Friendly	Olimpija (Socialist Federal Republic of Yugoslavia)	2–2	(Socialist Federal Republic of Yugoslavia) Partizan	Koper

22 February 1976 Friendly	Trešnjevka (Socialist Federal Republic of Yugoslavia)	0–3	(Socialist Federal Republic of Yugoslavia) Partizan	Zagreb
			Zavišić 17'; Đorđević 38', 55'	Attendance: 2,000; Referee: Grošinić (Zagreb)

28 April 1976 Friendly	Partizan (Socialist Federal Republic of Yugoslavia)	0–0	(Soviet Union) Dynamo Kyiv	Belgrade
				Stadium: Stadion JNA

== Competitions ==
=== Yugoslav First League ===
Pos	Team	Pld	W	D	L	GF	GA	GD	Pts	Qualification or relegation
1	Partizan (C)	34	22	6	6	60	30	+30	50	Qualification for European Cup first round
2	Hajduk Split	34	19	11	4	57	22	+35	49	Qualification for Cup Winners' Cup first round
3	Dinamo Zagreb	34	17	10	7	38	23	+15	44	Qualification for UEFA Cup first round
4	Red Star Belgrade	34	16	8	10	53	31	+22	40	Qualification for UEFA Cup first round
5	Vojvodina	34	11	12	11	41	42	−1	34	Qualification for Intertoto Cup

Source: rsssf.org
Rules for classification: 1) points; 2) goal difference; 3) number of goals scored.
(C) Champions

==== Matches ====
17 August 1975 1	Dinamo Zagreb	2–1	Partizan	Zagreb
	Vabec 8' 44' (pen.)		Vukotić 11'	Stadium: Stadion Maksimir; Attendance: 45,000

24 August 1975 2	Partizan	2–0	Rijeka	Belgrade
	Zavišić 9'; Đorđević 54' (pen.)			Stadium: Stadion JNA; Attendance: 10,000

27 August 1975 3	Radnički Niš	0–2	Partizan	Niš
			Bjeković 29'; Vukotić 68'	Stadium: Čair Stadium; Attendance: 25,000

30 August 1975 4	Partizan	0–0	Željezničar	Belgrade
				Stadium: Stadion JNA; Attendance: 7,000

7 September 1975 5	Crvena zvezda	2–0	Partizan	Belgrade
	Sušić 47'; Filipović 80'			Stadium: Stadion Rajko Mitić; Attendance: 77,551; Referee: Manojlovski

14 September 1975 6	Vardar	1–1	Partizan	Skopje
	Dimitrovski 35'		Bjeković 70'	Attendance: 20,000

21 September 1975 7	Partizan	4–0	Borac Banja Luka	Belgrade
	Đorđević 57' (pen.); Bjeković 74'; Perović 79'; Antić 89'			Stadium: Stadion JNA; Attendance: 20,000

28 September 1975 8	Radnički Kragujevac	1–2	Partizan	Kragujevac
	Kurčubić 31'		Tomić 42'; Bjeković 47'	Stadium: Čika Dača Stadium; Attendance: 20,000

4 October 1975 9	Partizan	1–1	Čelik	Belgrade
	Bjeković 43'		Buza 56'	Stadium: Stadion JNA; Attendance: 35,000

8 October 1975 10	Hajduk Split	0–1	Partizan	Split
			Todorović 60'	Stadium: Poljud; Attendance: 25,000

19 October 1975 11	Partizan	2–1	Sloboda Tuzla	Belgrade
	Vukotić 13'; Perović 38' (pen.)		Mulahasanović 60'	Stadium: Stadion JNA; Attendance: 15,000

25 October 1975 12	Sarajevo	3–5	Partizan	Sarajevo
	Sušić 10'; Šljivo 43', 78'		Đorđević 3'; Zavišić 6'; Perović 49', 76'; Đurović 56'	Stadium: Asim Ferhatović Hase Stadium; Attendance: 7,000

1 November 1975 13	Partizan	2–0	OFK Beograd	Belgrade
	Perović 38'; Zavišić 64'			Stadium: Stadion JNA; Attendance: 25,000

9 November 1975 14	Vojvodina	1–1	Partizan	Novi Sad
	Vučeković 20'		Trifunović 87' (o.g.)	Stadium: Karađorđe Stadium; Attendance: 25,000

23 November 1975 15	Partizan	2–0	Velež	Belgrade
	Bjeković 33'; Todorović 81'			Stadium: Stadion JNA; Attendance: 18,000

2 December 1975 16	Budućnost	1–1	Partizan	Titograd
	Janković 9'		Bjeković 70'	Attendance: 16,000

6 December 1975 17	Partizan	1–0	Olimpija	Belgrade
	Bjeković 23'			Stadium: Stadion JNA; Attendance: 28,000

7 March 1976 18	Partizan	3–0	Dinamo Zagreb	Belgrade
	Bjeković 23', 41'; Đorđević 37'			Stadium: Stadion JNA; Attendance: 25,000

14 March 1976 19	Rijeka	0–0	Partizan	Rijeka
				Stadium: Stadion Kantrida; Attendance: 13,000

20 March 1976 20	Partizan	2–0	Radnički Niš	Belgrade
	Perović 37' (pen.); Vukotić 70'			Stadium: Stadion JNA; Attendance: 8,000

24 March 1976 21	Željezničar	1–3	Partizan	Sarajevo
	Vlaški 8'		Arsenović 41'; Zavišić 43'; Perović 66'	Stadium: Stadion Grbavica; Attendance: 15,000

28 March 1976 22	Partizan	1–4	Crvena zvezda	Belgrade
	Bjeković 50'		Sušić 20'; Stamenković 30', 61'; Savić 36'	Stadium: Stadion JNA; Attendance: 51,562

4 April 1976 23	Partizan	1–0	Vardar	Belgrade
	Grubješić 69' (pen.)			Stadium: Stadion JNA; Attendance: 25,000

11 April 1976 24	Borac Banja Luka	0–1	Partizan	Banja Luka
			Đorđević 71'	Stadium: Banja Luka City Stadium; Attendance: 15,000

2 May 1976 25	Partizan	3–0	Radnički Kragujevac	Belgrade
	Vukotić 38'; Bjeković 48', 74'			Stadium: Stadion JNA; Attendance: 15,000

5 May 1976 26	Čelik	0–3	Partizan	Zenica
			Grubješić 28', 44'; Bjeković 90'	Stadium: Stadion Bilino Polje; Attendance: 28,000

9 May 1976 27	Partizan	1–6	Hajduk Split	Belgrade
	Bjeković 81'		Žungul 26', 56'; Buljan 45'; Jerković 60', 42'; Đorđević 68', 79'	Stadium: Stadion JNA; Attendance: 45,000; Referee: Marijan Rauš

29 May 1976 28	Sloboda Tuzla	2–0	Partizan	Tuzla
	Hatunić 85'; Geca 89'			Stadium: Stadion Tušanj; Attendance: 10,000

3 June 1976 29	Partizan	2–0	Sarajevo	Belgrade
	Bjeković 9' (pen.); Vukotić 38'			Stadium: Stadion JNA; Attendance: 15,000

6 June 1976 30	OFK Beograd	2–1	Partizan	Belgrade
	Vukašinović 1'; Santrač 53'		Bjeković 13' (pen.)	Stadium: Omladinski Stadium; Attendance: 12,000

23 June 1976 31	Velež Mostar	0–2	Partizan	Mostar
			Bjeković 27'; Zavišić 43' (pen.)	Attendance: 5,000

27 June 1976 32	Partizan	5–2	Vojvodina	Belgrade
	Bjeković 3' (pen.) 20' (pen.) 57'; Vukotić 13'; Zavišić 23'		Vučković 54'; Vukašinović 86'	Stadium: Stadion JNA; Attendance: 20,000

4 July 1976 33	Partizan	3–0	Budućnost	Belgrade
	Đorđić 9'; Bjeković 47' (pen.) 83'			Stadium: Stadion JNA; Attendance: 15,000

11 July 1976 34	Olimpija	0–1	Partizan	Ljubljana
		Report	Bjeković 90'	Stadium: Bežigrad Stadium; Attendance: 17,000

=== Yugoslav Cup ===
14 August 1975 First round	Čelik	1–0	Partizan	Zenica

== Statistics ==
=== Goalscorers ===
This includes all competitive matches.

Rank	Pos	Nat	Name	Yugoslav First League	Yugoslav Cup	Total
1	FW	(Socialist Federal Republic of Yugoslavia)	Nenad Bjeković	24	0	24
2	MF	(Socialist Federal Republic of Yugoslavia)	Momčilo Vukotić	7	0	7
2	FW	(Socialist Federal Republic of Yugoslavia)	Vukan Perović	7	0	7
4	FW	(Socialist Federal Republic of Yugoslavia)	Ilija Zavišić	6	0	6
5	FW	(Socialist Federal Republic of Yugoslavia)	Boško Đorđević	5	0	5
6	FW	(Socialist Federal Republic of Yugoslavia)	Pavle Grubješić	3	0	3
7	MF	(Socialist Federal Republic of Yugoslavia)	Aranđel Todorović	2	0	2
8	DF	(Socialist Federal Republic of Yugoslavia)	Radomir Antić	1	0	1
8	DF	(Socialist Federal Republic of Yugoslavia)	Svemir Đorđić	1	0	1
8	DF	(Socialist Federal Republic of Yugoslavia)	Dragan Arsenović	1	0	1
8	DF	(Socialist Federal Republic of Yugoslavia)	Predrag Tomić	1	0	1
8	DF	(Socialist Federal Republic of Yugoslavia)	Borislav Đurović	1	0	1
8	own goals			1	0	1
TOTALS				60	0	60

=== Score overview ===
Win Draw Loss

Opposition	Home score	Away score	Aggregate
Hajduk Split	1–6	1–0	2–6
Dinamo Zagreb	3–0	1–2	4–2
Crvena zvezda	1–4	0–2	1–6
Vojvodina	5–2	1–1	6–3
Sloboda Tuzla	2–1	0–2	2–3
OFK Beograd	2–0	1–2	3–2
Velež	2–0	2–0	4–0
Borac Banja Luka	4–0	1–0	5–0
Rijeka	2–0	0–0	2–0
Željezničar	0–0	3–1	3–1
Čelik	0–0	3–0	3–0
Olimpija	1–0	1–0	2–0
Budućnost	3–0	1–1	4–1
Radnički Niš	2–0	2–0	4–0
Vardar	1–0	1–1	2–1
Radnički Kragujevac	3–0	2–1	5–1

== See also ==
- List of FK Partizan seasons
