= 1977–78 FK Partizan season =

Partizan
1977–78 season
- President: Nikola Lekić
- Head coach: Ante Mladinić
- Yugoslav First League: Winners
- Yugoslav Cup: Round of 32
- Mitropa Cup: Winners
- Average home league attendance: 24,529

The 1977–78 season was the 32nd season in FK Partizan's existence. This article shows player statistics and matches that the club played during the 1977–78 season.

== Players ==
=== Squad information ===
players (league matches/ league goals):
Momčilo Vukotić (34/11)
Nenad Stojković (34/3)
Nikica Klinčarski (34/2)
Petar Borota (34/0) -goalkeeper-
Aleksandar Trifunović (32/5)
Borislav Đurović (28/1)
Boško Đorđević (27/5)
Jusuf Hatunić (27/0)
Milovan Jović (24/6)
Ilija Zavišić (24/4)
Xhevad Prekazi (22/2)
Ivan Golac (19/1)
Pavle Grubješić (17/3)
Slobodan Santrač (16/11)
Vladimir Pejović (15/0)
Tomislav Kovačević (14/0)
Dragan Arsenović (11/0)
Rešad Kunovac (8/0)
Refik Kozić (5/1)
Novica Vulić (4/0)
Aranđel Todorović (2/0)
Miroslav Polak (1/0)

== Friendlies ==
8 February 1978 Friendly	Partizan (Socialist Federal Republic of Yugoslavia)	3–0	(Switzerland) Lausanne-Sport	Split

== Competitions ==
=== Yugoslav First League ===
Pos	Team	Pld	W	D	L	GF	GA	GD	Pts	Qualification or relegation
1	Partizan (C)	34	22	10	2	55	19	+36	54	Qualification for European Cup first round
2	Red Star Belgrade	34	21	7	6	58	26	+32	49	Qualification for UEFA Cup first round
3	Hajduk Split	34	14	11	9	49	37	+12	39	Qualification for UEFA Cup first round
4	Dinamo Zagreb	34	12	13	9	54	49	+5	37	
5	Rijeka	34	12	13	9	47	42	+5	37	Qualification for Cup Winners' Cup first round

Source: rsssf.org
Rules for classification: 1) points; 2) goal difference; 3) number of goals scored.
(C) Champions

14 August 1977 1	Partizan	2–1	Olimpija	Belgrade
	Kozić 35'; Grubješić 47'			Stadium: JNA Stadium; Attendance: 25,000; Referee: Bracanović (Titograd)

21 August 1977 2	Zagreb	0–0	Partizan	Zagreb
				Stadium: Stadion Kranjčevićeva; Attendance: 13,000; Referee: Jusufbegović (Sarajevo)

27 August 1977 3	Partizan	1–0	Radnički Niš	Belgrade
	Grubješić 34'			Stadium: JNA Stadium; Attendance: 18,000; Referee: Kurir (Split)

31 August 1977 4	Partizan	3–0	Borac Banja Luka	Belgrade
	Jović 34', 83'; Vukotić 72'			Stadium: JNA Stadium; Attendance: 45,000

4 September 1977 5	Rijeka	1–1	Partizan	Rijeka
			Đorđević 21'	Stadium: Stadion Kantrida; Attendance: 12,000; Referee: Tauzes (Ljubljana)

11 September 1977 6	Partizan	1–0	Sloboda Tuzla	Belgrade
	Vukotić 72'			Stadium: JNA Stadium; Attendance: 35,000

18 September 1977 7	Velež	1–0	Partizan	Mostar
				Stadium: Stadion pod Bijelim Brijegom; Attendance: 10,000; Referee: Glažar (Rijeka)

21 September 1977 8	Partizan	5–1	Čelik	Belgrade
	Jović 9', 21' (pen.); Vukotić 25', 52'; Đurović 41'			Stadium: JNA Stadium; Attendance: 16,000; Referee: Rauš (Varaždin)

24 September 1977 9	Budućnost	0–1	Partizan	Titograd
			Vukotić 55'	Stadium: Podgorica City Stadium; Attendance: 10,000; Referee: Manojlovski (Tetovo)

9 October 1977 10	Partizan	0–0	Hajduk Split	Belgrade
				Stadium: JNA Stadium; Attendance: 50,000; Referee: Mađoski (Prilep)

12 October 1977 11	Dinamo Zagreb	0–2	Partizan	Zagreb
			Stojković 45'; Grubješić 48'	Stadium: Stadion Maksimir; Attendance: 45,000; Referee: Maksimović (Novi Sad)

16 October 1977 12	Partizan	3–1	OFK Beograd	Belgrade
	Stojković 35'; Zavišić 59', 72'			Stadium: JNA Stadium; Attendance: 30,000; Referee: Marković (Veliki Crljeni)

23 October 1977 13	Crvena zvezda	1–3	Partizan	Belgrade
	Filipović 33'		Trifunović 5'; Vukotić 8'; Zavišić 87'	Stadium: Marakana; Attendance: 80,000

30 October 1977 14	Partizan	3–0	Trepča	Belgrade
	Trifunović 39', 64'; Jović 75'			Stadium: JNA Stadium; Attendance: 25,000

6 November 1977 15	Vojvodina	0–2	Partizan	Novi Sad
			Prekazi 73'; Trifunović 87'	Stadium: Karađorđe Stadium; Attendance: 25,000; Referee: Nikić (Ljubljana)

20 November 1977 16	Partizan	2–0	Osijek	Belgrade
	Vukotić 19'; Klinčarski 37'			Stadium: JNA Stadium; Attendance: 17,000; Referee: Nikolić (Sarajevo)

4 December 1977 17	Sarajevo	1–1	Partizan	Sarajevo
			Vukotić 17'	Stadium: Koševo City Stadium; Attendance: 15,000; Referee: Rauš (Varaždin)

7 December 1977 18	Olimpija	0–2	Partizan	Ljubljana
			Prekazi 7'; Đorđević 14'	Stadium: Bežigrad Stadium; Attendance: 7,000; Referee: Dragojević (Titograd)

5 March 1978 19	Partizan	2–1	Zagreb	Belgrade
	Santrač 44', 46'			Stadium: JNA Stadium; Attendance: 40,000

12 March 1978 20	Radnički Niš	1–1	Partizan	Niš
			Zavišić 72'	Stadium: Čair Stadium; Attendance: 22,000; Referee: Glažar (Rijeka)

19 March 1978 21	Borac Banja Luka	0–0	Partizan	Banja Luka
				Attendance: 15,000

25 March 1978 22	Partizan	3–1	Rijeka	Belgrade
	Santrač 32', 48'; Golac 65'			Stadium: JNA Stadium; Attendance: 18,000

1 April 1978 23	Sloboda Tuzla	3–0	Partizan	Tuzla
				Attendance: 8,000

9 April 1978 24	Partizan	1–0	Velež	Belgrade
	Santrač 78' (pen.)			Stadium: JNA Stadium; Attendance: 40,000

13 April 1978 25	Čelik	0–0	Partizan	Zenica
				Attendance: 12,000

15 April 1978 26	Partizan	1–0	Budućnost	Belgrade
	Stojković 12'			Attendance: 10,000

23 April 1978 27	Hajduk Split	1–2	Partizan	Split
			Vukotić 10'; Đorđević 65'	Stadium: Stadion Stari plac Attendance: 25,000

26 April 1978 28	Partizan	5–0	Dinamo Zagreb	Belgrade
	Santrač 15' (pen.), 52'; Klinčarski 53'; Jović 74'; Đorđević 84'			Stadium: JNA Stadium; Attendance: 40,000; Referee: Bracanović

30 April 1978 29	OFK Beograd	2–3	Partizan	Belgrade
			Stojković; Zavišić

7 May 1978 30	Partizan	3–2	Crvena zvezda	Belgrade
	Vukotić 24', 71'; Santrač 60'		Jelikić 46'; Filipović 52'	Attendance: 40,000

10 May 1978 31	Trepča	1–1	Partizan	Kosovska Mitrovica
			Santrač 55'	Attendance: 18,000

14 May 1978 32	Partizan	1–0	Vojvodina	Belgrade
	Đorđević 38'			Stadium: JNA Stadium; Attendance: 20,000

21 May 1978 33	Osijek	1–1	Partizan	Osijek
			Santrač	Attendance: 30,000

28 May 1978 34	Partizan	0–0	Sarajevo	Belgrade
				Stadium: JNA Stadium; Attendance: 50,000

=== Yugoslav Cup ===
7 September 1977 Round of 32	Rijeka	1–0	Partizan	Rijeka
				Attendance: 8,000

=== Mitropa Cup ===
Team	Pld	W	D	L	GF	GA	GD	Pts
(Socialist Federal Republic of Yugoslavia) Partizan	4	3	0	1	14	4	+10	6
(Italy) Perugia	4	2	1	1	3	5	−2	5
(Czechoslovakia) Zbrojovka Brno	4	0	1	3	2	10	−8	1

28 September 1977 1	Partizan (Socialist Federal Republic of Yugoslavia)	5–1	(Czechoslovakia) Zbrojovka Brno	Belgrade, Yugoslavia
	Trifunović 2'; Vukotić 6', 79'; Grubješić 21'; Prekazi 81'			Stadium: JNA Stadium; Attendance: 10,000

14 December 1977 2	Perugia (Italy)	2–1	(Socialist Federal Republic of Yugoslavia) Partizan	Perugia, Italy
			Stojković 19'	Attendance: 15,000

29 March 1978 3	Zbrojovka Brno (Czechoslovakia)	2–3	(Socialist Federal Republic of Yugoslavia) Partizan	Brno, Czechoslovakia
			Santrač 45' (pen.); Vukotić 53'; Jović 63'	Attendance: 6,000

19 April 1978 4	Partizan (Socialist Federal Republic of Yugoslavia)	4–0	(Italy) Perugia	Belgrade, Yugoslavia
	Klinčarski 61'; Santrač 72'; Jović 87' (pen.); Zavišić 89'			Stadium: JNA Stadium; Attendance: 15,000

==== Final ====
13 December 1978 Final	Partizan (Socialist Federal Republic of Yugoslavia)	1–0	(Hungary) Budapest Honvéd	Belgrade, Yugoslavia
	Trifunović 63' (pen.)			Stadium: JNA Stadium; Attendance: 4,000

== Statistics ==
=== Goalscorers ===
This includes all competitive matches.

Rank	Pos	Nat	Name	Yugoslav First League	Yugoslav Cup	Total
1	MF	(Socialist Federal Republic of Yugoslavia)	Momčilo Vukotić	11	0	11
2	FW	(Socialist Federal Republic of Yugoslavia)	Slobodan Santrač	10	0	10
3	FW	(Socialist Federal Republic of Yugoslavia)	Milovan Jović	6	0	6
3	MF	(Socialist Federal Republic of Yugoslavia)	Ilija Zavišić	6	0	6
3	FW	(Socialist Federal Republic of Yugoslavia)	Boško Đorđević	5	0	5
6	DF	(Socialist Federal Republic of Yugoslavia)	Nenad Stojković	4	0	4
6	MF	(Socialist Federal Republic of Yugoslavia)	Aleksandar Trifunović	4	0	4
8	FW	(Socialist Federal Republic of Yugoslavia)	Pavle Grubješić	3	0	3
9	MF	(Socialist Federal Republic of Yugoslavia)	Dževad Prekazi	2	0	2
9	MF	(Socialist Federal Republic of Yugoslavia)	Nikica Klinčarski	2	0	2
11	DF	(Socialist Federal Republic of Yugoslavia)	Refik Kozić	1	0	1
11	DF	(Socialist Federal Republic of Yugoslavia)	Borislav Đurović	1	0	1
11	DF	(Socialist Federal Republic of Yugoslavia)	Ivan Golac	1	0	1
TOTALS				56	0	56

=== Score overview ===
Win Draw Loss

Opposition	Home score	Away score	Aggregate
Crvena zvezda	3–2	3–1	3–1
Hajduk Split	0–0	2–1	2–1
Dinamo Zagreb	5–0	2–0	7–0
Rijeka	3–1	1–1	4–2
Sloboda Tuzla	1–0	0–3	1–3
Velež	1–0	0–1	1–1
Vojvodina	1–0	2–0	3–0
Sarajevo	0–0	1–1	1–1
Olimpija	2–1	2–0	4–1
Budućnost	1–0	1–0	2–0
Borac Banja Luka	3–0	0–0	3–0
Osijek	2–0	1–1	3–1
Radnički Niš	1–0	1–1	2–1
Zagreb	2–1	0–0	2–1
OFK Beograd	3–1	3–2	6–3
Čelik	5–1	0–0	5–1
Trepča	3–0	1–1	4–1

== See also ==
- List of FK Partizan seasons
