= Partizan Belgrade 1–6 Hajduk Split (1976) =

- Event: 1975–76 Yugoslav First League
Partizan	Hajduk Split
1	6
- Date: 9 May 1976
- Venue: JNA Stadium, Belgrade
- Referee: Marijan Rauš (Varaždin)
- Attendance: 52,000

Partizan 1–6 Hajduk Split was a football match between Partizan Belgrade and Hajduk Split on 9 May 1976 at the JNA Stadium in Belgrade, Yugoslavia. It was the 27th round of the 1975–76 Yugoslav First League. Partizan was 1st in the league with 3 points ahead of the league holders Hajduk Split. With everybody expecting Partizan to defeat Hajduk, one of the biggest surprises in Yugoslav football happened and Hajduk managed to crush them 6-1 on away ground. The game itself represents the Hajduk Split golden generation of the 1970s and was the ultimate realization of "total football" that Tomislav Ivić forced during that time.

== Background ==
Hajduk Split was the favourite for winning the league in 1976 after winning it the 2 previous times in 1974 and 1975. Their football which was guided under coach Tomislav Ivić was considered to be revolutionary in Yugoslavia at the time. Players like Ivica Šurjak, Slaviša Žungul, Jurica Jerković, Branko Oblak and Dražen Mužinić were all considered to be world class players in Yugoslavia.

After the first part of the season in which Hajduk underperformed and lost vital points, they managed to recuperate in the 2nd part and gain form just in time for the derby against FK Partizan who was the leading club in the league.

== Match ==
What was expected to be an equal match turned to become a demolition of Partizan from the guest side. At first, while the game was tied 0-0, Partizan had their chances but Hajduk managed to respond through counter-attacks. The game was dominated by Hajduk and with goals from Žungul and Buljan, the 1st half ended with only 2-0 for Hajduk. In the 2nd half, Hajduk became more attacking and managed to score 4 more goals from Jerković,Žungul and 2 from Đorđević.

== Details ==
9 May 1976

Partizan	1–6	Hajduk Split
Bjeković 81'	Report	Žungul 26', 56'; Buljan 45'; Jerković 60'; Đorđević 68', 79'

JNA Stadium, Belgrade
Attendance: 52,000
Referee: Marijan Rauš (Varaždin)

GK	1	(Socialist Federal Republic of Yugoslavia) Radmilo Ivančević
DF	2	(Socialist Federal Republic of Yugoslavia) Predrag Tomić	Substituted off
DF	3	(Socialist Federal Republic of Yugoslavia) Refik Kozić
DF	4	(Socialist Federal Republic of Yugoslavia) Vlada Pejović
DF	5	(Socialist Federal Republic of Yugoslavia) Borislav Đurović
DF	6	(Socialist Federal Republic of Yugoslavia) Rešad Kunovac
MF	7	(Socialist Federal Republic of Yugoslavia) Ilija Zavišić
MF	8	(Socialist Federal Republic of Yugoslavia) Aleksandar Trifunović
FW	9	(Socialist Federal Republic of Yugoslavia) Nenad Bjeković	Substituted off
MF	10	(Socialist Federal Republic of Yugoslavia) Momčilo Vukotić (c)
MF	11	(Socialist Federal Republic of Yugoslavia) Pavle Grubješić
Substitutes:
DF	12	(Socialist Federal Republic of Yugoslavia) Ivan Golac	Substituted on
FW	13	(Socialist Federal Republic of Yugoslavia) Nenad Cvetković	Substituted on
Manager:
(Socialist Federal Republic of Yugoslavia) Tomislav Kaloperović

GK	1	(Socialist Federal Republic of Yugoslavia) Ivan Katalinić
DF	2	(Socialist Federal Republic of Yugoslavia) Mario Boljat
DF	3	(Socialist Federal Republic of Yugoslavia) Vedran Rožić
DF	4	(Socialist Federal Republic of Yugoslavia) Šime Luketin
DF	5	(Socialist Federal Republic of Yugoslavia) Luka Peruzović
DF	6	(Socialist Federal Republic of Yugoslavia) Ivan Buljan
FW	7	(Socialist Federal Republic of Yugoslavia) Slaviša Žungul
MF	8	(Socialist Federal Republic of Yugoslavia) Dražen Mužinić
FW	9	(Socialist Federal Republic of Yugoslavia) Boriša Đorđević
MF	10	(Socialist Federal Republic of Yugoslavia) Jurica Jerković (c)
MF	11	(Socialist Federal Republic of Yugoslavia) Ivica Šurjak
Manager:
(Socialist Federal Republic of Yugoslavia) Tomislav Ivić

== Aftermath ==
Despite defeating Partizan, Hajduk eventually failed to win the league after there was a scandal in the last round game when Partizan in need of a win to secure the title won against Olimpija scoring in the 95th minute of the game (even though UEFA didn't introduce additional time for another 20 years) thanks to referee Maksimović. Partizan was crowned champion at the end of the season and Tomislav Ivić decided to leave Hajduk so that he can manage AFC Ajax. Ivić would return again to Hajduk in 1978 and lead them to their last Yugoslav league title in the 1978–79 Yugoslav First League.
