= 1978–79 FK Partizan season =

Partizan
1978–79 season
- President: Nikola Lekić
- Head coach: Ante Mladinić (until 31 December 1978); Florijan Matekalo (until 14 April 1979); Jovan Miladinović
- Yugoslav First League: 15th
- Yugoslav Cup: Runners-up
- European Cup: First round
- Top goalscorer: League: All: Slobodan Santrač

The 1978–79 season was the 33rd season in FK Partizan's existence. This article shows player statistics and matches that the club played during the 1978–79 season.

== Friendlies ==
12 July 1978 Friendly	Nantes (France)	1–2	(Socialist Federal Republic of Yugoslavia) Partizan	Nantes, France

13 July 1978 Friendly	Bordeaux (France)	0–3	(Socialist Federal Republic of Yugoslavia) Partizan	Bordeaux, France

15 July 1978 Friendly	Nancy (France)	4–2	(Socialist Federal Republic of Yugoslavia) Partizan	Nancy, France

24 July 1978 Friendly	Partizan (Socialist Federal Republic of Yugoslavia)	2–2	(West Germany) Hamburger SV	Belgrade

9 August 1978 Friendly	Partizan (Socialist Federal Republic of Yugoslavia)	3–0	(Belgium) Standard Liège	Belgrade

24 June 1979 Friendly	Melbourne XI (Australia)	1–0	(Socialist Federal Republic of Yugoslavia) Partizan	Melbourne, Australia

29 June 1979 Friendly	Australia	1–1	(Socialist Federal Republic of Yugoslavia) Partizan	Newcastle, Australia

1 July 1979 Friendly	Australia	0–1	(Socialist Federal Republic of Yugoslavia) Partizan	Sydney, Australia
			Varga 54'	Attendance: 15,000

7 July 1979 Friendly	Partizan (Socialist Federal Republic of Yugoslavia)	3–0	(Socialist Federal Republic of Yugoslavia) OFK Beograd	Belgrade
	Santrač; Prekazi			Stadium: Stadion JNA; Referee: Todor Oluški (Novi Sad)

8 July 1979 Friendly	Partizan (Socialist Federal Republic of Yugoslavia)	3–1	(Socialist Federal Republic of Yugoslavia) Crvena zvezda	Belgrade
	Varga 55'; Živković 84'; Santrač 89' (pen.)		Šestić 14'	Stadium: Stadion JNA; Attendance: 20,000; Referee: Dragan Delević (Beograd)

== Competitions ==
=== Yugoslav First League ===
Pos	Team	Pld	W	D	L	GF	GA	GD	Pts	Qualification or relegation
13	Osijek	34	8	13	13	32	39	−7	29	
14	Napredak Kruševac	34	9	11	14	43	51	−8	29	
15	Partizan	34	9	11	14	39	47	−8	29	
16	Olimpija	34	11	7	16	34	53	−19	29	
17	NK Zagreb (R)	34	8	12	14	32	39	−7	28	Relegation to Yugoslav Second League

Source: rsssf.org
Rules for classification: 1) points; 2) goal difference; 3) number of goals scored.
(R) Relegated

13 August 1978 1	Partizan	0–3	Napredak Kruševac	Belgrade
				Stadium: JNA Stadium; Attendance: 35,000

20 August 1978 2	Olimpija	2–4	Partizan	Ljubljana

23 August 1978 3	Partizan	2–2	Hajduk Split	Belgrade
	Santrač 55', 75' (pen.)		Đorđević 44'; Vujović 79'	Stadium: JNA Stadium; Attendance: 50,000; Referee: Mađoski

27 August 1978 4	Željezničar	2–2	Partizan	Sarajevo

3 September 1978 5	Partizan	3–3	Dinamo Zagreb	Belgrade

10 September 1978 6	Radnički Niš	0–0	Partizan	Niš
				Attendance: 23,000

16 September 1978 7	Partizan	3–0	Borac Banja Luka	Belgrade

10 September 1978 8	Osijek	1–1	Partizan	Osijek

7 October 1978 9	Partizan	2–1	Velež	Belgrade

15 October 1978 10	Vojvodina	1–1	Partizan	Novi Sad

28 October 1978 11	Partizan	1–0	Rijeka	Belgrade

5 November 1978 12	Sarajevo	2–1	Partizan	Sarajevo

11 November 1978 13	Partizan	0–0	Zagreb	Belgrade
				Stadium: JNA Stadium; Attendance: 7,000

18 November 1978 14	Sloboda Tuzla	0–1	Partizan	Tuzla
			Kozić 17'	Attendance: 7,000

26 November 1978 15	Partizan	0–1	OFK Beograd	Belgrade
				Stadium: JNA Stadium; Attendance: 10,000

29 November 1978 16	Partizan	1–3	Crvena zvezda	Belgrade
	Santrač 32'		Šestić 23'; Milosavljević 60'; Krmpotić 72'	Stadium: JNA Stadium; Attendance: 15,000

2 December 1978 17	Budućnost	1–0	Partizan	Titograd
				Attendance: 10,000

4 March 1979 18	Napredak Kruševac	2–2	Partizan	Kruševac
			Stojković 45'; Santrač 84' (pen.)	Attendance: 30,000

11 March 1979 19	Partizan	2–1	Olimpija	Belgrade
	Santrač 17'; Kozić 29'			Stadium: JNA Stadium; Attendance: 18,000

18 March 1979 20	Hajduk Split	2–0	Partizan	Split
				Attendance: 30,000

24 March 1979 21	Partizan	0–2	Željezničar	Belgrade
				Stadium: JNA Stadium; Attendance: 15,000

8 April 1979 22	Dinamo Zagreb	1–0	Partizan	Zagreb
				Attendance: 35,000

14 April 1979 23	Partizan	0–1	Radnički Niš	Belgrade
				Stadium: JNA Stadium; Attendance: 2,000

22 April 1979 24	Borac Banja Luka	0–0	Partizan	Banja Luka
				Attendance: 12,000

28 April 1979 25	Partizan	0–0	Osijek	Belgrade
				Stadium: JNA Stadium; Attendance: 5,000

6 May 1979 26	Velež	4–1	Partizan	Mostar
			Živković 54'	Attendance: 15,000

9 May 1979 27	Partizan	3–0	Vojvodina	Belgrade
	Đorđević 27'; Kozić 38'; Stojković 87'			Stadium: JNA Stadium; Attendance: 15,000

13 May 1979 28	Rijeka	2–0	Partizan	Rijeka
				Attendance: 9,000

27 May 1979 29	Zagreb	1–0	Partizan	Zagreb
				Attendance: 8,000

31 May 1979 30	Partizan	3–1	Sloboda Tuzla	Belgrade
	Santrač; Živković; Đorđević			Stadium: JNA Stadium; Attendance: 10,000

3 June 1979 31	OFK Beograd	2–1	Partizan	Belgrade
			Živković 76'	Attendance: 15,000

6 June 1979 32	Partizan	1–1	Sarajevo	Belgrade
	Santrač 68'		Repčić 76'	Stadium: JNA Stadium; Attendance: 22,000

10 June 1979 33	Crvena zvezda	3–0	Partizan	Belgrade
	Savić 53', 66'; Borovnica 60'			Stadium: Marakana; Attendance: 40,000

17 June 1979 34	Partizan	4–2	Budućnost	Belgrade
	Živković 4'; Santrač 19', 24', 49'		Miročević 48' (pen.); Jovanović 63'	Stadium: JNA Stadium; Attendance: 25,000

=== Yugoslav Cup ===
30 August 1978 Round of 32	Partizan	5–1	OFK Beograd	Belgrade
	Pavković 26'; Santrač 37', 53', 60'; Đorđević 79'			Stadium: Stadion JNA; Attendance: 15,000

8 November 1978 Round of 16	Velež	0–0 (11–12 p)	Partizan	Mostar
				Attendance: 18,000

25 February 1979 Quarter-finals	Borac Banja Luka	2–2 (2–4 p)	Partizan	Banja Luka
			Santrač 35'; Trifunović 47'	Attendance: 15,000

5 April 1979 Semi-finals	Partizan	1–0	Proleter Zrenjanin	Belgrade
	Jović 85'			Stadium: Stadion JNA; Attendance: 300; Referee: Josip Glažar (Rijeka)

16 May 1979 Final 1st leg	Rijeka	2–1	Partizan	Rijeka
	Cukrov 18'; Bursać 85'		Kozić 68'	Stadium: Stadion Kantrida; Attendance: 20,000; Referee: Aleksandar Nikić (Ljubljana)

24 May 1979 Final 2nd leg	Partizan	0–0	Rijeka	Belgrade
				Stadium: Marakana*; Attendance: 55,000; Referee: Tome Manojlovski (Tetovo)

=== European Cup ===
==== First round ====
13 September 1978 First round 1st leg	Partizan (Socialist Federal Republic of Yugoslavia)	2–0	(East Germany) Dynamo Dresden	Belgrade, Yugoslavia
	Prekazi 5'; Đurović 47'	Report		Stadium: JNA Stadium; Attendance: 50,000; Referee: Hilmi Ok (Turkey)

27 September 1978 First round 2nd leg	Dynamo Dresden (East Germany)	2–0 (2 – 2 agg.) (5–4 p)	(Socialist Federal Republic of Yugoslavia) Partizan	Dresden, East Germany
	Dörner 8'; Weber 38'	Report		Stadium: Dynamo-Stadion; Attendance: 29,000; Referee: Valentin Lipatov (Soviet Union)

== See also ==
- List of FK Partizan seasons
