= Petar Borota =

Serbian footballer (1952–2010)

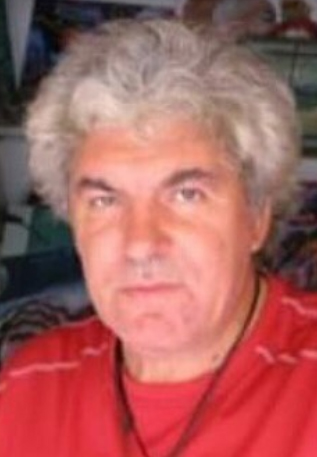
- Borota in 2009

Personal information
- Full name: Petar Borota
- Date of birth: 5 March 1952
- Place of birth: Belgrade, PR Serbia, Yugoslavia
- Date of death: 12 February 2010 (aged 57)
- Place of death: Genoa, Italy
- Height: 1.82 m (5 ft 11 1/2 in)
- Position: Goalkeeper

Senior career*
Years	Team	Apps	(Gls)
1969–1976	OFK Beograd	131	(0)
1976–1979	Partizan	77	(0)
1979–1982	Chelsea	107	(0)
1982	Brentford	0	(0)
1982–1983	Portimonense	7	(0)
1983–1984	Boavista	15	(0)
1984–1985	Porto	0	(0)
1986	Boavista	0	(0)
Total		337	(0)

International career
1977–1978	Yugoslavia	4	(0)
- * Club domestic league appearances and goals

Petar Borota (Serbian Cyrillic: Петар Борота, pronounced [pětar bôrota, - bǒ-]; 5 March 1952 – 12 February 2010) was a Serbian footballer who played as a goalkeeper, most notably for Serbian clubs OFK Beograd and Partizan and English club Chelsea.

In addition to great goalkeeping ability, Borota is also remembered for his eccentric style of play in goal that occasionally led to him conceding bizarre goals.

== Club career ==
Borota started playing professional football with OFK Beograd in 1969, recording 8 league appearances for the club by the end of the season. Over the coming years he marked himself out as an able goalkeeper, earning a spot on the Yugoslav under-21 team and attracting interest from bigger clubs.

=== Partizan ===
Eventually in 1975, he agreed terms with FK Partizan across town, leaving OFK after six seasons. However, before joining the crno-beli he went to serve the mandatory army stint that kept him out of action for the entire 1975–76 season.

==== 1976–77 season ====
Borota finally joined the reigning league champion Partizan in late 1976 with the season already in progress. The 23-year-old claimed a place between the goal posts right away, making 27 league appearances until the end of the season under also newly arrived head coach Biće Mladinić.

==== 1977–78 season ====
For the following 1977–78 season, Borota was an established squad member. With head coach Mladinić behind the bench, Partizan claimed the domestic title in dominating fashion behind the goalscoring efforts of club legend Moca Vukotić and new acquisition Slobodan Santrač (arrived in the winter transfer window, and scored 11 goals in 16 matches during the half-season), but also thanks in no small part to Borota (in addition to rugged central defenders Nenad Stojković and Jusuf Hatunić as well as full backs Nikica Klinčarski and Ivan Golac) who let in only 19 goals in 34 league matches.

==== 1978–79 season ====
The 1978–79 season saw Partizan defend the domestic title in addition to competing in the European Champions Cup. The first round tie versus East German champions Dynamo Dresden was marked by another one of Borota's bizarre blunders that he was already known for. The return leg on 27 September 1978 had Partizan arriving to Dresden with a comfortable two-goal advantage from the first match in Belgrade (2–0). However, in the 8th minute of the second leg match, forgetting that play hasn't been stopped after making a save since neither goal-out nor foul got called, Borota placed the ball onto the 5-meter line and moved far away to take a run and kick it into play. He moved so far away from the ball that Dynamo forward Hans-Jürgen Dörner had enough time to step in and nudge it into the unguarded net. The strange goal stood, and by the end Dynamo managed to score another one for 0–2 final score and thus take the match into extra-time. Dynamo won 4–5 on penalties thus eliminating Partizan as Borota faced a barrage of criticism from the Partizan faithful.

The defending league champions were on a downward spiral in the league, too, as unexpected losses tied them firmly to the bottom half of the table. Only a few months later, Borota would repeat the calamitous mistake from Dresden, this time in on 29 November 1978 during the 63rd league edition of the Eternal Derby versus bitter cross-town rivals Red Star Belgrade. Playing in the snow-covered JNA Stadium in front of only 15,000 fans, the goalkeeper again collected the ball from a cross in front of opposing forwards while colliding with one of them, and again wrongly assumed that play stoppage had been called, thus placing the ball down unguarded. The referee Desimir Pavićević from Kragujevac actually didn't call a foul since Borota firmly held control of the ball during the aerial challenge so when Borota put it down, Red Star forward Miloš Šestić snuck in and pushed it into empty net for the match's opening goal. Red Star eventually recorded a 1–3 victory. Various urban legends persist about this event: from the one that Šestić actually mislead Borota on purpose by telling him, while the keeper was down on the ground with the ball in his hands, that the ref had called a foul to the one that Borota was confused by the sound of a whistle that came from a Red Star fan in the stands.

Due to his shaky displays and the team's overall atrocious form, Borota lost the coach's trust, making only 16 appearances between the posts that season. Head coach Mladinić resigned two weeks after the derby in late December during the winter break as Florijan Matekalo took over from January. In March, before the season's end, with the team battling relegation threat, Borota (who was about to turn 27 years of age) got sold to Chelsea.

=== Chelsea ===
Borota signed for Chelsea in March 1979 for a transfer fee of £70,000 with the club on the verge of relegation from the First Division. Brought in by manager Danny Blanchflower as a replacement for legendary goalie Peter Bonetti, Borota made his debut against champions-elect Liverpool on 4 March 1979 and impressed in a 0–0 draw. However, the next five league matches all ended in defeat, culminating in a 6–0 thrashing by Nottingham Forest as Borota ultimately could not prevent relegation to the Second Division. He continued with his flamboyant and somewhat eccentric style – on occasions, he would dribble up the field and attempt to get past opposition players or throw the ball against the crossbar when taking a goal kick – which endeared him to the Chelsea fans and helped make him a cult hero at the club.

As the 1979–80 season in Second Division began, manager Blanchflower resigned in September 1979 and England legend Geoff Hurst was brought in as replacement. Borota continued as a regular under Hurst as the team finished fourth in the standings, missing the promotion on goal-difference.

Ahead of the 1980–81 season Hurst named Borota to be the squad captain. Borota was voted Chelsea Player of the Year in 1981 after keeping 16 clean sheets that season; he made 114 appearances for the club.

However, his erratic behaviour sometimes backfired and led to the team conceding goals, which did not endear him to his managers. After a fall-out with John Neal he joined Brentford in 1982 (with Chelsea still in the Second Division) and later Portuguese sides Boavista and FC Porto. He made 114 appearances in all competitions for Chelsea and kept 36 clean sheets.

== International career ==
As he came into his own with FK Partizan during the league-winning 1977–78 season, Borota started getting national team callups as well.

The 26-year-old Hajduk Split's keeper Ivan Katalinić had been the national team's first choice goalie at the time under 3-man head coaching commission (consisting of Marko Valok, Stevan Vilotić, and Gojko Zec) as well as under previous head coach Ivan Toplak, however, the team's faltering 1978 World Cup qualifying campaign with two opening losses that led to Toplak's removal prompted a need to look at other options in goal as well.

The coaching triumvirate of Valok, Vilotić and Zec gave 25-year-old Borota a debut as second-half substitute for Katalinić on 5 October 1977 in the away friendly versus Hungary.

=== 1978 World Cup qualifying ===
One month after his debut, Borota got a surprise opportunity to start in the crucial qualifier away versus Romania that was a must-win for Yugoslavia. The contest turned into a furious and epic scoring affair with Borota amateurishly conceding a long-range lob effort by Iosif Vigu only 4 minutes in. Plavi overturned the score to 1–2 by the 18th minute on a goal from Safet Sušić and a superb 25-meter strike by Dražen Mužinić, but the momentum shifted again as Anghel Iordănescu and László Bölöni managed to beat Borota twice more by halftime for 3–2 Romanian lead with poor aerial heading effort and bad positional play of Yugoslav defenders contributing to both goals. Early into the second half young Sušić took over again: first with a great individual move blowing by several defenders before scoring followed ten minutes later by a hard driven low shot off a laid-on free kick, for a 3–4 Yugoslavia lead. Still, Romanians mustered up one more comeback, albeit partial with a headed goal by Dudu Georgescu for 4–4, but Yugoslavs responded right back through Aleksandar Trifunović and Zoran Filipović by the end for a 4–6 final score.

Despite a win being recorded, Borota was demoted to the bench as Katalinić went back between the posts for the next must-win qualifier at home versus Spain that Yugoslavia had to win by 2 goals in order to qualify.

Following the failure to beat Spain and qualify for the World Cup, the coaching commission was disbanded with only Vilotić continuing as the head coach for the time being. He led the team in two friendlies and gave Borota a substitute appearance against Italy.

=== Euro 1980 qualifying ===
For the start of Euro 1980 qualifying in the autumn of 1978 FSJ brought back Biće Mladinić, who at the time also led FK Partizan, to be the next national team head coach.

The campaign began at home versus old rivals Spain and Yugoslavia lost again as Borota sat on the bench. For the next qualifier away at Romania on 25 October 1978, Mladinić gave Borota (his goalie at Partizan) a start. The high scoring from the previous qualifying cycle from a year earlier repeated again, but this time Romania won 3–2. Vladimir Petrović put Yugoslavia up on a penalty kick for 0–1 at halftime, but Romanians came back in the second half with three unanswered goals (a brace by defender Ștefan Sameș followed by Iordănescu penalty kick). This was Borota's last national team appearance.

He finished his international career with 4 caps in total, two of which were starts in competitive matches.

== Post-playing career ==
Borota tried his hand at coaching, but didn't get further than several low-profile appointments in South Africa during the 1980s.

By the early 1990s he came back to Belgrade. Already devoting much of his time to abstract painting (he had his work displayed in London in 1981 while an active player), Borota put together an exhibition in Srećna nova umetnost gallery in Belgrade's SKC. In 1994, he was implicated in an art theft ring of Paja Jovanović paintings and served a six-month spell in investigative detention.

After getting out of prison, through his friendship with Vujadin Boškov and Siniša Mihajlović, Borota moved to Genoa in Italy where he made a living by painting.

He died on 12 February 2010 in Genoa, after a long illness, aged 57. He was buried at the New Cemetery in Belgrade on 25 February 2010 with the ceremony attended by his friends and colleagues such as Momčilo Vukotić, Slobodan Santrač, Vladimir Petrović Pižon, Dževad Prekazi, and Milutin Šoškić among others.
