= 1977–78 Yugoslav First League =

Prva savezna liga
- Season: 1977–78
- Dates: 14 August 1977 – 28 May 1978
- Champions: Partizan (8th title)
- Relegated: Čelik; Trepča
- European Cup: Partizan
- Cup Winners' Cup: Rijeka
- UEFA Cup: Red Star; Hajduk Split
- Matches played: 272
- Top goalscorer: Radomir Savić (21)
- Average attendance: 9,845

== Teams ==
A total of eighteen teams contested the league, including sixteen sides from the 1976–77 season and two sides promoted from the 1976–77 Yugoslav Second League (YSL) as winners of the two second level divisions East and West. The league was contested in a double round robin format, with each club playing every other club twice, for a total of 34 rounds. Two points were awarded for wins and one point for draws.

Napredak and Željezničar were relegated from the 1976–77 Yugoslav First League after finishing the season in bottom two places of the league table. The two clubs promoted to top level were Trepča and NK Osijek.

Team	Location	Federal Republic	Position in 1976–77
Borac Banja Luka	Banja Luka	SR Bosnia and Herzegovina	6th
Budućnost	Titograd	SR Montenegro	9th
Čelik	Zenica	SR Bosnia and Herzegovina	13th
Dinamo Zagreb	Zagreb	SR Croatia	2nd
Hajduk Split	Split	SR Croatia	8th
OFK Belgrade	Belgrade	SR Serbia	15th
Olimpija Ljubljana	Ljubljana	SR Slovenia	12th
Osijek	Osijek	SR Croatia	—
Partizan	Belgrade	SR Serbia	4th
Radnički Niš	Niš	SR Serbia	7th
Red Star	Belgrade	SR Serbia	1st
Rijeka	Rijeka	SR Croatia	5th
Sarajevo	Sarajevo	SR Bosnia and Herzegovina	16th
Sloboda	Tuzla	SR Bosnia and Herzegovina	3rd
Trepča	Kosovska Mitrovica	SR Serbia	—
Velež	Mostar	SR Bosnia and Herzegovina	11th
Vojvodina	Novi Sad	SR Serbia	14th
NK Zagreb	Zagreb	SR Croatia	10th

== League table ==
Pos	Team	Pld	W	D	L	GF	GA	GD	Pts	Qualification or relegation
1	Partizan (C)	34	22	10	2	55	19	+36	54	Qualification for European Cup first round
2	Red Star Belgrade	34	21	7	6	58	26	+32	49	Qualification for UEFA Cup first round
3	Hajduk Split	34	14	11	9	49	37	+12	39	Qualification for UEFA Cup first round
4	Dinamo Zagreb	34	12	13	9	54	49	+5	37	
5	Rijeka	34	12	13	9	47	42	+5	37	Qualification for Cup Winners' Cup first round
6	Sloboda Tuzla	34	15	5	14	47	46	+1	35	
7	Velež	34	13	9	12	42	43	−1	35	
8	Vojvodina	34	14	4	16	46	38	+8	32	Qualification for Intertoto Cup
9	Sarajevo	34	11	10	13	50	46	+4	32	
10	Olimpija	34	13	6	15	44	44	0	32	
11	Budućnost	34	12	7	15	41	51	−10	31	
12	Borac Banja Luka	34	10	10	14	44	50	−6	30	
13	Osijek	34	9	12	13	32	42	−10	30	
14	Radnički Niš	34	9	12	13	31	42	−11	30	
15	NK Zagreb	34	9	11	14	37	46	−9	29	
16	OFK Belgrade	34	10	8	16	38	54	−16	28	
17	Čelik (R)	34	9	10	15	34	50	−16	28	Relegation to Yugoslav Second League
18	Trepça (R)	34	7	10	17	28	52	−24	24	Relegation to Yugoslav Second League

Source: rsssf.org
Rules for classification: 1) points; 2) goal difference; 3) number of goals scored.
(C) Champions; (R) Relegated

== Results ==
Home \ Away	BOR	BUD	ČEL	DIN	HAJ	OFK	OLI	OSI	PAR	RNI	RSB	RIJ	SAR	SLO	TRE	VEL	VOJ	ZAG
Borac Banja Luka		2–2	1–1	1–3	0–0	2–1	2–0	3–1	0–0	4–0	0–0	0–0	2–1	3–1	5–1	4–1	0–1	1–1
Budućnost	1–0		2–1	2–1	2–0	1–0	2–1	2–1	0–1	0–1	0–1	1–1	3–0	2–1	4–1	0–1	2–1	1–0
Čelik	1–4	1–1		3–3	2–1	1–1	1–0	2–0	0–0	1–0	2–2	2–2	0–2	1–0	2–0	2–0	2–1	2–1
Dinamo Zagreb	3–1	4–1	3–1		0–0	4–2	1–1	1–0	0–2	1–0	1–1	2–2	3–3	6–2	4–0	0–2	2–2	1–1
Hajduk Split	1–1	5–2	3–0	2–1		1–0	1–0	0–1	1–2	2–0	0–0	2–2	1–0	4–2	2–0	0–0	2–1	3–1
OFK Belgrade	4–1	0–0	2–0	0–0	1–4		1–3	3–0	1–2	1–1	0–0	3–2	2–0	1–0	1–1	2–0	1–5	2–0
Olimpija	3–1	2–0	1–1	1–1	2–0	4–2		0–0	0–2	2–1	0–1	1–0	2–1	1–2	1–0	3–0	4–2	2–0
Osijek	2–2	3–0	0–0	1–0	0–0	1–2	1–0		1–1	2–2	0–0	1–1	2–0	2–1	2–2	1–1	1–1	0–1
Partizan	3–0	1–0	5–1	5–0	0–0	3–1	2–1	2–0		1–0	3–2	3–1	0–0	1–0	3–0	1–0	1–0	2–1
Radnički Niš	0–1	2–2	2–0	0–0	2–2	2–1	2–2	1–0	1–1		0–2	0–1	1–1	1–0	1–0	2–0	3–2	3–1
Red Star	2–0	4–3	2–0	0–1	1–1	2–0	5–1	4–1	1–3	2–0		4–0	2–1	0–1	4–1	1–0	1–0	4–0
Rijeka	2–0	1–1	2–1	4–0	2–0	3–1	1–0	1–2	1–1	1–0	0–1		2–2	0–0	3–0	2–0	3–2	3–3
Sarajevo	5–0	3–1	3–1	1–1	0–3	5–0	2–1	4–1	1–1	1–1	1–3	0–0		2–1	2–1	4–2	2–0	1–1
Sloboda Tuzla	3–1	1–0	1–0	1–1	3–0	1–1	2–1	2–0	3–0	3–1	1–3	2–0	3–1		1–1	2–1	2–1	2–1
Trepça	0–0	0–0	1–0	2–0	2–3	0–1	1–1	0–2	1–1	1–1	0–1	1–2	1–0	3–1		2–0	1–0	1–2
Velež	3–2	5–2	2–2	4–2	2–1	0–0	1–0	0–0	1–0	0–0	2–0	4–1	2–1	3–1	1–1		0–0	2–1
Vojvodina	2–0	2–0	1–0	1–3	2–1	3–0	3–0	0–2	0–2	4–0	2–0	0–0	2–0	2–0	0–1	2–1		1–0
NK Zagreb	1–0	3–1	1–0	0–1	3–3	2–0	2–3	3–1	0–0	0–0	1–2	2–1	0–0	1–1	1–1	1–1	1–0	

Source: DataSoccer.it
Legend: Blue = home team win; Yellow = draw; Red = away team win.

== Winning squad ==
Champions: FK Partizan
Player	League	
Player	Matches	Goals
Momčilo Vukotić	34	11
Nenad Stojković	34	3
Nikica Klinčarski	34	2
Petar Borota (goalkeeper)	34	0
Aleksandar Trifunović	32	5
Borislav Đurović	28	1
Boško Đorđević	27	5
Jusuf Hatunić	27	0
Milovan Jović	24	6
Ilija Zavišić	24	4
Xhevad Prekazi	22	2
Ivan Golac	19	1
Pavle Grubješić	17	3
Slobodan Santrač	16	11
Vladimir Pejović	15	0
Tomislav Kovačević	14	0
Dragan Arsenović	11	0
Rešad Kunovac	8	0
Refik Kozić	5	1
Novica Vulić	4	0
Aranđel Todorović	2	0
Miroslav Polak	1	0
Head coach: Ante Mladinić

== Top scorers ==
Rank	Player	Club	Goals
1	(Socialist Federal Republic of Yugoslavia) Radomir Savić	Sarajevo	21
2	(Socialist Federal Republic of Yugoslavia) Vahid Halilhodžić	Velež	18
3	(Socialist Federal Republic of Yugoslavia) Miodrag Kustudić	Rijeka	17
4	(Socialist Federal Republic of Yugoslavia) Zoran Filipović	Red Star	15
4	(Socialist Federal Republic of Yugoslavia) Slaviša Žungul	Hajduk Split	15
6	(Socialist Federal Republic of Yugoslavia) Mersad Kovačević	Sloboda Tuzla	14
7	(Socialist Federal Republic of Yugoslavia) Milan Radović	Rijeka	12
7	(Socialist Federal Republic of Yugoslavia) Muhamed Ibrahimbegović	Borac Banja Luka	12
7	(Socialist Federal Republic of Yugoslavia) Dušan Mitošević	Radnički Niš	12
7	(Socialist Federal Republic of Yugoslavia) Slobodan Santrač	Partizan / OFK Belgrade	12

== Attendance ==
Club	Average home attendance	Average away attendance
FK Partizan	24,529	19,118
Red Star Belgrade	20,588	19,706
Dinamo Zagreb	17,647	14,735
NK Osijek	14,235	8,471
Hajduk Split	11,588	14,824
Budućnost Titograd	10,706	7,324
Trepča Kosovska Mitrovica	8,882	8,559
Čelik Zenica	7,706	6,088
Borac Banja Luka	7,529	6,353
FK Vojvodina	7,471	8,235
FK Sarajevo	7,176	9,235
Radnički Niš	7,176	6,412
FK Velež	6,529	7,529
NK Rijeka	6,088	6,382
NK Olimpija	5,676	7,853
NK Zagreb	4,882	8,765
OFK Beograd	4,529	9,500
Sloboda Tuzla	4,265	8,118

- Overall league attendance per match: 9,845 spectators

== See also ==
- 1977–78 Yugoslav Cup
