= Aleksandar Trifunović =

Aleksandar Trifunović may refer to:

- Aleksandar Trifunović (basketball) (born 1967), Serbian basketball coach and former player
- Aleksandar Trifunović (footballer) (born 1954), Serbian footballer
