= 1975–76 Yugoslav First League =

Prva savezna liga
- Season: 1975–76
- Dates: 17 August 1975 – 11 July 1976
- Champions: Partizan (7th title)
- Relegated: Vardar; Radnički Kragujevac
- European Cup: Partizan
- Cup Winners' Cup: Hajduk Split
- UEFA Cup: Dinamo Zagreb; Red Star
- Matches: 272
- Goals: 705 (2.59 per match)
- Top goalscorer: Nenad Bjeković (24)
- Average attendance: 11,670

The 1975–76 Yugoslav First League was the 1975–1976 season of the premier football league in Yugoslavia. The season culminated in the "First League Championship," which was won by Partizan.

== Teams ==
A total of eighteen teams contested the league, including sixteen sides from the 1974–75 season and two sides promoted from the 1974–75 Yugoslav Second League (YSL) as winners of the two second level divisions East and West. The league was contested in a double round robin format, with each club playing every other club twice, for a total of 34 rounds. Two points were awarded for wins and one point for draws.

FK Bor and Proleter Zrenjanin were relegated from the 1974–75 Yugoslav First League after finishing the season in bottom two places of the league table. The two clubs promoted to top level were Borac Banja Luka and Budućnost.

Team	Location	Federal Republic	Position in 1974–75
Borac Banja Luka	Banja Luka	SR Bosnia and Herzegovina	—N/a
Budućnost	Titograd	SR Montenegro	—N/a
Čelik	Zenica	SR Bosnia and Herzegovina	11th
Dinamo Zagreb	Zagreb	SR Croatia	5th
Hajduk Split	Split	SR Croatia	1st
OFK Belgrade	Belgrade	SR Serbia	8th
Olimpija Ljubljana	Ljubljana	SR Slovenia	12th
Partizan	Belgrade	SR Serbia	6th
Radnički Kragujevac	Kragujevac	SR Serbia	15th
Radnički Niš	Niš	SR Serbia	10th
Red Star	Belgrade	SR Serbia	3rd
NK Rijeka	Rijeka	SR Croatia	14th
FK Sarajevo	Sarajevo	SR Bosnia and Herzegovina	13th
Sloboda	Tuzla	SR Bosnia and Herzegovina	7th
Vardar	Skopje	SR Macedonia	16th
Velež	Mostar	SR Bosnia and Herzegovina	4th
Vojvodina	Novi Sad	SR Serbia	2nd
Željezničar	Sarajevo	SR Bosnia and Herzegovina	9th

=== Managers ===
Club	Managers
Borac Banja Luka	(Socialist Federal Republic of Yugoslavia) Miljenko Mihić
Budućnost	(Socialist Federal Republic of Yugoslavia) Dušan Varagić
Čelik	(Socialist Federal Republic of Yugoslavia) Alojz Renić
Dinamo Zagreb	(Socialist Federal Republic of Yugoslavia) Mirko Bazić
Hajduk Split	(Socialist Federal Republic of Yugoslavia) Tomislav Ivić
OFK Belgrade	(Socialist Federal Republic of Yugoslavia) Milutin Šoškić
Olimpija Ljubljana	(Socialist Federal Republic of Yugoslavia) Slavko Luštica
Partizan	(Socialist Federal Republic of Yugoslavia) Tomislav Kaloperović
Radnički Kragujevac	(Socialist Federal Republic of Yugoslavia) Zoran Ristić

Club	Managers
Radnički Niš	(Socialist Federal Republic of Yugoslavia) Ðorđe Kačunković
Red Star Belgrade	(Socialist Federal Republic of Yugoslavia) Milovan Ćirić
Rijeka	(Socialist Federal Republic of Yugoslavia) Gojko Zec
Sarajevo	(Socialist Federal Republic of Yugoslavia) Vukašin Višnjevac
Sloboda	(Socialist Federal Republic of Yugoslavia) Josip Duvančić
Vardar	(Socialist Federal Republic of Yugoslavia) Petar Šulinčevski
Velež	(Socialist Federal Republic of Yugoslavia) Sulejman Rebac
Vojvodina	(Socialist Federal Republic of Yugoslavia) Todor Veselinović
Željezničar	(Socialist Federal Republic of Yugoslavia) Milan Ribar

== League table ==
Pos	Team	Pld	W	D	L	GF	GA	GD	Pts	Qualification or relegation
1	Partizan (C)	34	22	6	6	60	30	+30	50	Qualification for European Cup first round
2	Hajduk Split	34	19	11	4	57	22	+35	49	Qualification for Cup Winners' Cup first round
3	Dinamo Zagreb	34	17	10	7	38	23	+15	44	Qualification for UEFA Cup first round
4	Red Star Belgrade	34	16	8	10	53	31	+22	40	Qualification for UEFA Cup first round
5	Vojvodina	34	11	12	11	41	42	−1	34	Qualification for Intertoto Cup
6	Sloboda Tuzla	34	11	11	12	46	42	+4	33	
7	Sarajevo	34	12	9	13	45	51	−6	33	
8	OFK Belgrade	34	13	7	14	40	48	−8	33	
9	Velež	34	10	12	12	39	37	+2	32	
10	Borac Banja Luka	34	9	14	11	34	40	−6	32	
11	Rijeka	34	9	13	12	35	37	−2	31	
12	Željezničar	34	11	9	14	40	47	−7	31	
13	Čelik	34	10	10	14	29	35	−6	30	
14	Olimpija	34	10	10	14	37	44	−7	30	
15	Budućnost	34	11	8	15	25	42	−17	30	
16	Radnički Niš	34	7	15	12	30	41	−11	29	
17	Vardar (R)	34	8	12	14	27	36	−9	28	Relegation to Yugoslav Second League
18	Radnički Kragujevac (R)	34	8	7	19	29	57	−28	23	Relegation to Yugoslav Second League

Source: rsssf.org
Rules for classification: 1) points; 2) goal difference; 3) number of goals scored.
(C) Champions; (R) Relegated

== Results ==
Home \ Away	BOR	BUD	ČEL	DIN	HAJ	OFK	OLI	PAR	RDK	RNI	RSB	RIJ	SAR	SLO	VAR	VEL	VOJ	ŽEL
Borac Banja Luka		0–0	3–0	1–0	0–2	1–1	0–0	0–1	2–0	3–2	1–2	1–1	3–1	1–0	2–1	1–1	2–2	1–1
Budućnost	0–0		0–0	1–1	1–2	2–1	2–3	1–1	1–0	3–1	1–0	2–0	2–0	1–0	2–0	1–0	1–0	1–0
Čelik	2–1	2–0		2–0	0–0	1–2	2–0	0–3	2–0	1–1	2–0	3–0	1–0	3–4	0–0	1–1	1–1	2–1
Dinamo Zagreb	1–0	1–0	3–1		0–1	0–0	2–1	2–1	2–0	2–1	3–0	3–0	2–0	3–1	1–0	1–1	1–1	2–0
Hajduk Split	3–0	2–0	3–0	2–1		4–2	2–1	0–1	2–0	1–0	1–0	1–3	4–0	4–0	2–0	0–0	0–0	5–1
OFK Belgrade	0–3	2–0	2–0	0–2	1–1		1–1	2–1	5–1	0–0	2–2	0–1	3–0	3–2	1–0	1–3	3–1	1–0
Olimpija	0–0	1–0	1–0	0–0	4–2	2–1		0–1	1–0	3–2	2–2	1–1	1–3	1–1	3–1	1–2	3–2	1–1
Partizan	4–0	3–0	1–1	3–0	1–6	2–0	1–0		3–0	2–0	1–4	2–0	2–0	2–1	1–0	2–0	5–2	0–0
Radnički Kragujevac	4–1	1–1	1–0	0–1	0–0	0–1	1–3	1–2		2–1	0–0	3–1	0–1	1–0	1–1	2–2	3–0	1–0
Radnički Niš	0–0	0–0	1–0	0–0	0–0	4–1	2–0	0–2	0–0		0–0	2–2	2–0	2–2	0–0	4–3	1–0	0–1
Red Star	2–1	4–0	0–1	2–0	0–1	0–1	0–0	2–0	5–0	3–0		2–1	5–1	1–3	3–1	1–0	1–1	3–0
Rijeka	0–0	5–0	2–0	0–0	1–2	0–0	1–0	0–0	1–1	3–0	0–1		2–0	2–1	0–0	0–0	0–0	2–3
Sarajevo	1–1	1–1	2–1	1–1	0–0	6–0	2–1	3–5	3–2	1–1	2–1	1–0		3–3	3–1	0–0	3–0	2–2
Sloboda Tuzla	0–1	2–0	0–0	1–1	1–1	1–0	3–1	2–0	6–0	1–1	0–0	1–0	1–0		0–0	1–0	2–0	2–2
Vardar	2–2	2–1	0–0	0–0	2–1	3–0	3–0	1–1	1–2	0–0	0–1	1–1	2–2	1–0		1–0	2–0	1–0
Velež	2–1	3–0	0–0	0–1	2–2	1–2	1–0	0–2	3–1	1–1	2–0	0–1	0–1	4–2	2–0		2–2	2–2
Vojvodina	3–0	2–0	1–0	0–1	0–0	1–0	2–1	1–1	2–1	4–0	2–2	1–1	1–0	1–1	2–0	2–0		2–0
Željezničar	1–1	2–0	1–0	2–0	0–0	2–1	0–0	1–3	3–0	0–1	1–4	5–3	0–2	2–1	2–0	0–1	4–2	

Source: DataSoccer.it
Legend: Blue = home team win; Yellow = draw; Red = away team win.

== Winning squad ==
Champions: FK Partizan
Player	League	
Player	Matches	Goals
Momčilo Vukotić	33	7
Rešad Kunovac	33	0
Borislav Đurović	32	1
Radmilo Ivančević	32	0
Nenad Bjeković	31	24
Ilija Zavišić	31	6
Refik Kozić	30	0
Ivan Golac	26	0
Aranđel Todorović	25	2
Boško Đorđević	23	5
Predrag Tomić	23	1
Vukan Perović	19	7
Vlado Pejović	19	0
Dragan Arsenović	16	1
Svemir Đorđić	14	1
Nenad Stojković	14	0
Pavle Grubješić	12	3
Aco Trifunović	8	0
Radomir Antić	7	1
Blagoj Istatov	3	0
Simo Nikolić	3	0
Dževad Prekazi	3	0
Nenad Cvetković	1	0
Head coach: Tomislav Kaloperović

== Top scorers ==
Rank	Player	Club	Goals
1	(Socialist Federal Republic of Yugoslavia) Nenad Bjeković	Partizan	24
2	(Socialist Federal Republic of Yugoslavia) Drago Vabec	Dinamo Zagreb	19
3	(Socialist Federal Republic of Yugoslavia) Vahid Halilhodžić	Velež	17
4	(Socialist Federal Republic of Yugoslavia) Slaviša Žungul	Hajduk Split	14
5	(Socialist Federal Republic of Yugoslavia) Jovan Geca	Sloboda Tuzla	13
6	(Socialist Federal Republic of Yugoslavia) Jurica Jerković	Hajduk Split	12
7	(Socialist Federal Republic of Yugoslavia) Zoran Filipović	Red Star	11
8	(Socialist Federal Republic of Yugoslavia) Srebrenko Repčić	Sarajevo	10
8	(Socialist Federal Republic of Yugoslavia) Muhamed Ibrahimbegović	Borac Banja Luka	10
8	(Socialist Federal Republic of Yugoslavia) Goran Jurišić	Olimpija	10
8	(Socialist Federal Republic of Yugoslavia) Vili Ameršek	Olimpija	10
9	(Socialist Federal Republic of Yugoslavia) Dušan Šujica	Vardar	6

== Attendance ==
Club	Average home attendance	Average away attendance
Red Star Belgrade	27,176	23,882
FK Partizan	22,647	24,412
Dinamo Zagreb	18,176	13,912
Hajduk Split	17,941	23,647
Budućnost Titograd	12,529	8,176
FK Vardar	12,235	7,265
Borac Banja Luka	10,147	9,412
NK Rijeka	9,176	7,794
Čelik Zenica	9,176	7,382
FK Sarajevo	9,147	9,412
FK Željezničar	9,000	10,647
Radnički Niš	8,941	8,941
FK Vojvodina	8,529	11,294
Radnički Kragujevac	8,029	7,912
NK Olimpija	7,265	8,765
FK Velež	7,235	11,324
OFK Beograd	6,382	8,441
Sloboda Tuzla	6,324	7,441

- Overall league attendance per match: 11,670 spectators

== See also ==
- 1975–76 Yugoslav Cup
- Yugoslav League Championship
- Football Association of Yugoslavia
