= Sead Sarajlić =

Bosnian-Herzegovinian footballer

Personal information
- Full name: Sead Sarajlić
- Date of birth: 30 July 1957 (age 69)
- Place of birth: Tuzla, SFR Yugoslavia
- Position: Midfielder

Senior career*
Years	Team	Apps	(Gls)
1975–1982	Sloboda Tuzla	150	(27)
1983	Partizan	11	(0)
1984–1986	Sloboda Tuzla	18	(0)
1989–1990	GOŠK-Jug	16	(1)
1986–1988	Eisenstadt		
- * Club domestic league appearances and goals

Sead Sarajlić (born 30 July 1957) is a Bosnian-Herzegovinian retired footballer.

== Club career ==
Sarajlić was one of the most influential players of Sloboda Tuzla during the late 1970s and 1980s. He had a short six months spell in the Yugoslav giant Partizan, winning the Yugoslav First League 1982-83, but left them after not impressing the manager Miloš Milutinović. He also played for GOŠK-Jug and other clubs in Austria and Germany.

== Post-playing career ==
After retiring he has coached youth teams at FK Sloboda Tuzla.
