= Sead Sušić =

Bosnian footballer

Personal information
- Date of birth: 3 January 1953 (age 73)
- Place of birth: Zavidovići, PR Bosnia and Herzegovina, Yugoslavia
- Height: 1.78 m (5 ft 10 in)
- Position: Striker

Youth career
- FK Sarajevo

Senior career*
Years	Team	Apps	(Gls)
1970–1978	Red Star Belgrade	80	(25)
1978	Colorado Caribous	15	(6)
1978	Toronto Metros-Croatia	7	(5)
1978–1980	FC Liège	31	(16)
1980–1982	RWDM	22	(6)

International career
1977	Yugoslavia	1	(0)
- * Club domestic league appearances and goals

Sead Sušić (born 3 January 1953) is a Bosnian former football player who played for Red Star Belgrade, among other teams. He also earned one cap for Yugoslavia against Spain's national team, in 1978.

== Club career ==
Sušić arrived to Red Star Belgrade in 1971 as a talented 18-year-old where he played under head coach Miljan Miljanić.

== International career ==
He made one appearance for Yugoslavia, in a November 1977 World Cup qualification match against Spain.

== Post-playing ==
After retiring from playing, Sušić began living in Sarajevo. During the late 1980s and early 1990s, he ran a restaurant named Stari krovovi in the Sarajevo neighbourhood of Kovačići.

In the 1990s, Sušić made Liège his primary residence where he has been working as a FIFA-licensed players' agent.

== Personal life ==
Sušić's son is Tino-Sven Sušić. Safet Sušić is his younger brother. Sušić's mother Paša died at age 96 in April 2018.
