= Slobodan Santrač =

Yugoslav and Serbian football manager and player (1946–2016)

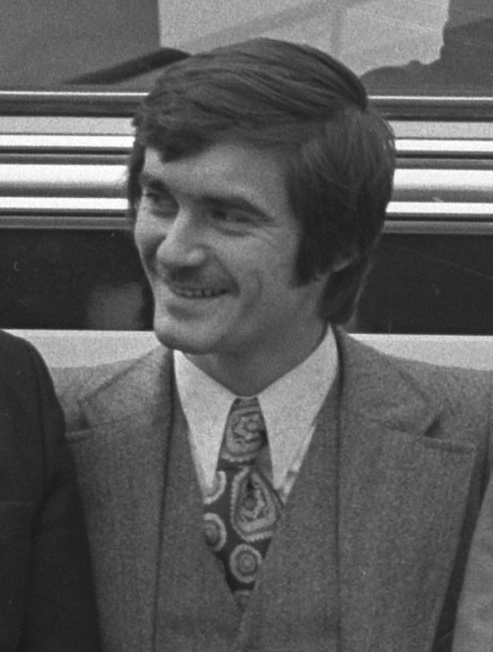
- Santrač in 1972

Personal information
- Full name: Slobodan Santrač
- Date of birth: 1 July 1946
- Place of birth: Koceljeva, PR Serbia, FPR Yugoslavia
- Date of death: 13 February 2016 (aged 69)
- Place of death: Belgrade, Serbia
- Height: 1.71 m (5 ft 7 in)
- Position: Striker

Youth career
- 1957–1958: Takovo
- 1958–1959: Radnički Valjevo
- 1959–1965: Metalac Valjevo

Senior career*
Years	Team	Apps	(Gls)
1965–1974	OFK Beograd	244	(169)
1974–1976	Grasshoppers	42	(29)
1976–1977	OFK Beograd	40	(17)
1978–1980	Partizan	63	(29)
1980–1983	Galenika Zemun	56	(31)
Total		445	(275)

International career
1966–1974	Yugoslavia	8	(1)

Managerial career
- 1994–1998: FR Yugoslavia
- 1999–2000: Shandong Luneng
- 2001: Saudi Arabia
- 2005: Macedonia
- 2008: Changsha Ginde
- 2009: Qingdao Jonoon
- 2011: Shaanxi Renhe
- * Club domestic league appearances and goals

Slobodan Santrač (Serbian Cyrillic: Слободан Сантрач, pronounced [slobǒdan sântraːtʃ]; 1 July 1946 – 13 February 2016) was a Yugoslav and Serbian football manager and player.

A prolific striker, Santrač is the Yugoslav First League all-time top scorer with 218 goals. He is also the top scorer in the history of OFK Beograd. As a manager, Santrač reached the knockout stage at the 1998 FIFA World Cup with FR Yugoslavia.

== Club career ==
Born in Koceljeva, Santrač grew up in Gornji Milanovac, starting out at local club Takovo. He moved with his family to Valjevo in 1958 and soon joined Radnički, which merged into Metalac Valjevo in 1959. Due to his promising performances in the Serbian League, Santrač was transferred to Yugoslav First League club OFK Beograd in the summer of 1965. He spent nine seasons with the Romantičari, totaling 244 league appearances and scoring 169 goals. During that time, Santrač was the Yugoslav First League top scorer on four occasions (1968, 1970, 1972, and 1973). He also won the Yugoslav Cup in 1966, scoring a brace in the final against Dinamo Zagreb.

In 1974, after completing his mandatory military service, Santrač moved abroad and joined Swiss club Grasshoppers. He was their best scorer in both seasons during his stay with them, before returning to OFK Beograd near the end of the 1975–76 season. Santrač was transferred to Partizan in the winter of 1978, winning the league just a few months upon arriving at the club. He spent two more seasons with the Crno-beli, before switching to Yugoslav Second League side Galenika Zemun in the 1980–81 season as part of the deal for Dragan Mance. With 19 goals in 1981–82, Santrač helped the team win promotion to the top flight for the first time ever. He retired from playing in 1983.

== International career ==
Despite being a prolific scorer during his entire club career, Santrač never established himself at international level, making just eight friendly appearances (only 110 minutes played) for Yugoslavia between 1966 and 1974. His first cap for the national team came on 1 June 1966 in a 2–0 loss to Bulgaria and his only goal later that month against Sweden, in a game that ended in a 1–1 draw.

== Managerial career ==
In November 1994, Santrač was announced as the inaugural manager of the national team of FR Yugoslavia, while the country was still under UN sanctions. He served as their manager for almost four years, qualifying them for the 1998 FIFA World Cup. Subsequently, Santrač went abroad to China and took charge of Shandong Luneng, winning the double in 1999. He was also manager of Saudi Arabia (2001) and Macedonia (2005).

== Death ==
Santrač died of a heart attack on 13 February 2016 at the age of 69.

== Career statistics ==
=== Club ===
Appearances and goals by club, season and competition
Club	Season	League			National cup (Note: Includes Yugoslav Cup, Swiss Cup)		League cup (Note: Includes Swiss League Cup)		Continental		Total	
Club	Season	Division	Apps	Goals	Apps	Goals	Apps	Goals	Apps	Goals	Apps	Goals
Metalac Valjevo	1963–64	Serbian League South			—		—		—			
Metalac Valjevo	1964–65	Serbian League South			—		—		—			
Metalac Valjevo	Total				—		—		—			
OFK Beograd	1965–66	Yugoslav First League	26	20	5	7	—		—		31	27
OFK Beograd	1966–67	Yugoslav First League	28	12	2	2	—		2 (Note: Appearances in European Cup Winners' Cup)	0	32	14
OFK Beograd	1967–68	Yugoslav First League	28	22	3	2	—		—		31	24
OFK Beograd	1968–69	Yugoslav First League	34	16	1	1	—		6 (Note: Appearances in Inter-Cities Fairs Cup)	9	41	26
OFK Beograd	1969–70	Yugoslav First League	31	20	2	1	—		—		33	21
OFK Beograd	1970–71	Yugoslav First League	32	19	2	1	—		—		34	20
OFK Beograd	1971–72	Yugoslav First League	34	33	1	0	—		4 (Note: Appearances in UEFA Cup)	2	39	35
OFK Beograd	1972–73	Yugoslav First League	28	25	0	0	—		8	5	36	30
OFK Beograd	1973–74	Yugoslav First League	3	2	0	0	—		0	0	3	2
OFK Beograd	Total		244	169	16	14	—		20	16	280	199
Grasshoppers	1974–75	Nationalliga A	24	17	2	0	3	2	4	2	33	21
Grasshoppers	1975–76	Nationalliga A	18	12	5	2	1	0	2	2	26	16
Grasshoppers	Total		42	29	7	2	4	2	6	4	59	37
OFK Beograd	1975–76	Yugoslav First League	6	5	0	0	—		—		6	5
OFK Beograd	1976–77	Yugoslav First League	29	11	1	1	—		—		30	12
OFK Beograd	1977–78	Yugoslav First League	5	1	0	0	—		—		5	1
OFK Beograd	Total		40	17	1	1	—		—		41	18
Partizan	1977–78	Yugoslav First League	16	11	0	0	—		—		16	11
Partizan	1978–79	Yugoslav First League	29	14	5	4	—		1 (Note: Appearances in European Cup)	0	35	18
Partizan	1979–80	Yugoslav First League	18	4	3	1	—		—		21	5
Partizan	Total		63	29	8	5	—		1	0	72	34
Galenika Zemun	1980–81	Yugoslav Second League	14	9	—		—		—		14	9
Galenika Zemun	1981–82	Yugoslav Second League	24	19	4	4	—		—		28	23
Galenika Zemun	1982–83	Yugoslav First League	18	3	2	0	—		—		20	3
Galenika Zemun	Total		56	31	6	4	—		—		62	35
Career total			445	275	38	26	4	2	27	20	514	323

=== International ===
Appearances and goals by national team and year
National team	Year	Apps	Goals
Yugoslavia	1966	3	1
Yugoslavia	1967	0	0
Yugoslavia	1968	0	0
Yugoslavia	1969	0	0
Yugoslavia	1970	0	0
Yugoslavia	1971	0	0
Yugoslavia	1972	4	0
Yugoslavia	1973	0	0
Yugoslavia	1974	1	0
Total		8	1

=== Managerial ===
Managerial record by team and tenure
Team	From	To	Record				
Team	From	To	P	W	D	L	Win %
FR Yugoslavia	1994	1998	43	26	10	7	60.47
Saudi Arabia	2001	2001	7	3	2	2	42.86
Total			50	29	12	9	58.00

== Honours ==
=== Player ===
OFK Beograd

- Yugoslav Cup: 1965–66

Grasshoppers

- Swiss League Cup: 1974–75

Partizan

- Yugoslav First League: 1977–78
- Mitropa Cup: 1977–78

Galenika Zemun

- Yugoslav Second League: 1981–82 (Group East)

Individual

- Yugoslav First League top scorer: 1967–68, 1969–70, 1971–72, 1972–73
- European Bronze Shoe: 1971–72

=== Manager ===
Shandong Luneng

- Chinese Jia-A League: 1999
- Chinese FA Cup: 1999

Individual

- Chinese Football Association Coach of the Year: 1999
