= Nikica Klinčarski =

Macedonian retired footballer (born 1957)

Personal information
- Full name: Nikica Klinčarski
- Date of birth: 5 January 1957 (age 69)
- Place of birth: Berovo, PR Macedonia, FPR Yugoslavia
- Position: Winger

Youth career
- Partizan

Senior career*
Years	Team	Apps	(Gls)
1976–1985	Partizan	219	(17)
1985	Las Vegas Americans (indoor)	24	(13)
1985–1986	Pittsburgh Spirit (indoor)	41	(13)
1986–1987	Chicago Sting (indoor)	32	(8)
1987–1989	Partizan	42	(0)
1989	Västra Frölunda	16	(0)
1989–1991	AIK Bačka Topola		

International career
1976–1978	Yugoslavia U21		
1980–1983	Yugoslavia	8	(1)

Managerial career
- 1993–1995: Rad (youth)
- 1995–2000: Partizan (youth)
- 1995–2000: FR Yugoslavia U17
- 2000: Teleoptik
- 2002–2003: Al-Hilal (youth)
- 2009–2010: Partizan (assistant)
- 2011–2014: Teleoptik (assistant)
Medal record
Representing Yugoslavia
Gold medal – first place	UEFA U-21 Euro	1978
- * Club domestic league appearances and goals

Nikica Klinčarski (Macedonian: Никица Клинчарски; born 5 January 1957) is a Macedonian retired footballer.

== Club career ==
He played a total of 518 matches for FK Partizan being by this the second player with most games played in the club, behind Momčilo Vukotić with 752. He played in the Major Indoor Soccer League in the United States under the name of Nicky Klincarski.

== International career ==
He played a total of eight matches for Yugoslavia national football team. His debut was crowned with a goal on 22 March 1980 in Sarajevo against Uruguay (2-1 win) and his last match was on 30 March 1983 in Timişoara against Romania (2–0 win).

== Honours ==
Partizan

- Yugoslav First League: 1977–78, 1982–83
- Yugoslav Cup: 1988–89
- Mitropa Cup: 1977–78

List of international goals scored by Nikica Klinčarski
No.	Date	Venue	Opponent	Score	Result	Competition
1	22 March 1980	Sarajevo, Yugoslavia	Uruguay	1–0	2–1	Friendly

== Notes ==
1. Sometimes also spelled Nickie Klincarski or Nick Klincarski.
