= 1981–82 Yugoslav Second League =

Yugoslav Second League
- Season: 1981–82
- Champions: Dinamo Vinkovci (West Division); Galenika Zemun (East Division)
- Promoted: Dinamo Vinkovci; Galenika Zemun
- Relegated: Rudar Velenje; Svoboda; Mogren; Pobeda

The 1981–82 Yugoslav Second League season was the 36th season of the Second Federal League (Serbo-Croatian: Druga savezna liga), the second level association football competition of SFR Yugoslavia, since its establishment in 1946. The league was contested in two regional groups (West Division and East Division), with 16 clubs each.

== West Division ==
=== Teams ===
A total of sixteen teams contested the league, including twelve sides from the 1980–81 season, one club relegated from the 1980–81 Yugoslav First League and three sides promoted from the Inter-Republic Leagues played in the 1980–81 season. The league was contested in a double round robin format, with each club playing every other club twice, for a total of 30 rounds. Two points were awarded for wins and one point for draws.

Borac Banja Luka were relegated from the 1980–81 Yugoslav First League after finishing in the 17th place of the league table. The three clubs promoted to the second level were Kikinda, Kozara and Solin.

At the winter break, Svoboda stepped out of the league meaning a total of 29 rounds was played in the season. Due to expansion of league to 18 teams in the following season, only two teams were relegated, Svoboda and Rudar Velenje.

Locations of teams' home cities in the 1981–82 Yugoslav Second League West

Team	Location	Federal subject	Position in 1980–81
AIK Bačka Topola	Bačka Topola	(Socialist Republic of Serbia) SAP Vojvodina	8th
Borac Banja Luka	Banja Luka	SR Bosnia and Herzegovina	—
Dinamo Vinkovci	Vinkovci	SR Croatia	3rd
Čelik	Zenica	SR Bosnia and Herzegovina	6th
GOŠK-Jug	Dubrovnik	SR Croatia	14th
Iskra	Bugojno	SR Bosnia and Herzegovina	2nd
Jedinstvo Bihać	Bihać	SR Bosnia and Herzegovina	13th
Jedinstvo Brčko	Brčko	SR Bosnia and Herzegovina	7th
Kikinda	Kikinda	(Socialist Republic of Serbia) SAP Vojvodina	—
Kozara	Bosanska Gradiška	SR Bosnia and Herzegovina	—
Leotar	Trebinje	SR Bosnia and Herzegovina	12th
Proleter Zrenjanin	Zrenjanin	(Socialist Republic of Serbia) SAP Vojvodina	4th
Rudar Velenje	Titovo Velenje	SR Slovenia	11th
Solin	Solin	SR Croatia	—
Spartak Subotica	Subotica	(Socialist Republic of Serbia) SAP Vojvodina	5th
Svoboda	Ljubljana	SR Slovenia	9th

=== League table ===
Pos	Team	Pld	W	D	L	GF	GA	GD	Pts	Promotion or relegation
1	Dinamo Vinkovci (C, P)	29	18	4	7	70	24	+46	40	Promotion to Yugoslav First League
2	Spartak Subotica	29	17	6	6	42	18	+24	40	
3	Čelik	29	16	6	7	68	32	+36	38	
4	Borac Banja Luka	29	13	8	8	50	26	+24	34	
5	Iskra	29	13	7	9	38	25	+13	33	
6	Kikinda	29	13	6	10	38	37	+1	32	
7	Leotar	29	13	4	12	35	40	−5	30	
8	Proleter Zrenjanin	29	11	6	12	38	40	−2	28	
9	Jedinstvo Bihać	29	10	8	11	33	36	−3	28	
10	AIK Bačka Topola	29	11	5	13	37	34	+3	27	
11	GOŠK-Jug	29	10	7	12	27	35	−8	27	
12	Kozara	29	12	3	14	35	45	−10	27	
13	Solin	29	11	4	14	44	47	−3	26	
14	Jedinstvo Brčko	29	9	6	14	29	40	−11	24	
15	Rudar (R)	29	3	4	22	15	87	−72	10	Relegation to Inter-Republic Leagues
16	Svoboda (R)	15	1	4	10	7	40	−33	6	Relegation to Inter-Republic Leagues

Source: fsgzrenjanin.com
Rules for classification: 1) points; 2) goal difference; 3) number of goals scored.
(C) Champions; (P) Promoted; (R) Relegated

== East Division ==
=== Teams ===
A total of sixteen teams contested the league, including eleven sides from the 1980–81 season, one club relegated from the 1980–81 Yugoslav First League and four sides promoted from the Inter-Republic Leagues played in the 1980–81 season. The league was contested in a double round robin format, with each club playing every other club twice, for a total of 30 rounds. Two points were awarded for wins and one point for draws.

Napredak Kruševac were relegated from the 1980–81 Yugoslav First League after finishing in the 18th place of the league table. The four clubs promoted to the second level were Liria, Mogren, Pobeda and Timok.

Due to expansion of league to 18 teams in the following season, only two teams were relegated, Mogren and Pobeda.

Locations of teams' home cities in the 1981–82 Yugoslav Second League East

Team	Location	Federal subject	Position in 1980–81
Bor	Bor	SR Serbia	10th
Borac Čačak	Čačak	SR Serbia	6th
Dubočica	Leskovac	SR Serbia	11th
Galenika Zemun	Zemun	SR Serbia	2nd
Liria	Prizren	(Socialist Republic of Serbia) SAP Kosovo	—
Mogren	Budva	SR Montenegro	—
Napredak Kruševac	Kruševac	SR Serbia	—
Pobeda	Prilep	SR Macedonia	—
Prishtina	Pristina	(Socialist Republic of Serbia) SAP Kosovo	8th
Rad	Belgrade	SR Serbia	3rd
Radnički Kragujevac	Kragujevac	SR Serbia	5th
Sloboda Titovo Užice	Titovo Užice	SR Serbia	9th
Sutjeska	Nikšić	SR Montenegro	4th
OFK Titograd	Titograd	SR Montenegro	12th
Timok	Zaječar	SR Serbia	—
Trepča	Kosovska Mitrovica	(Socialist Republic of Serbia) SAP Kosovo	7th

=== League table ===
Pos	Team	Pld	W	D	L	GF	GA	GD	Pts	Promotion or relegation
1	Galenika Zemun (C, P)	30	18	7	5	56	20	+36	43	Promotion to Yugoslav First League
2	Trepča	30	15	7	8	48	34	+14	37	
3	Timok	30	13	7	10	34	32	+2	33	
4	Sloboda Titovo Užice	30	12	8	10	28	32	−4	32	
5	Sutjeska Nikšić	30	12	8	10	30	36	−6	32	
6	Bor	30	10	11	9	36	24	+12	31	
7	Rad	30	11	9	10	37	32	+5	31	
8	Napredak Kruševac	30	10	10	10	34	33	+1	30	
9	Prishtina	30	10	8	12	36	32	+4	28	
10	Borac Čačak	30	10	8	12	29	27	+2	28	
11	Radnički Kragujevac	30	11	6	13	37	38	−1	28	
12	Liria	30	8	11	11	29	36	−7	27	
13	Dubočica	30	9	9	12	21	39	−18	27	
14	OFK Titograd	30	10	6	14	36	46	−10	26	
15	Mogren (R)	30	9	6	15	22	44	−22	24	Relegation to Inter-Republic Leagues
16	Pobeda (R)	30	8	7	15	36	44	−8	23	Relegation to Inter-Republic Leagues

Source: fsgzrenjanin.com
Rules for classification: 1) points; 2) goal difference; 3) number of goals scored.
(C) Champions; (P) Promoted; (R) Relegated

== See also ==
- 1981–82 Yugoslav First League
- 1981–82 Yugoslav Cup
