= Kočo Dimitrovski =

Macedonian footballer

Personal information
- Full name: Kočo Dimitrovski
- Date of birth: 13 March 1950 (age 76)
- Place of birth: Skopje, SFR Yugoslavia
- Height: 1.81 m (5 ft 11 1/2 in)
- Position: Midfielder

Youth career
- 1964–1968: Vardar Skopje

Senior career*
Years	Team	Apps	(Gls)
1968–1985	Vardar Skopje	845	(95)

Managerial career
- 1999: Vardar Skopje
- –2013: Borec
- * Club domestic league appearances and goals

Kočo Dimitrovski (Macedonian: Кочо Димитровски; born 13 March 1950 in Skopje, SR Macedonia, SFR Yugoslavia) is a retired Macedonian football player.
