= 1982–83 Yugoslav First League =

Prva savezna liga
- Season: 1982–83
- Dates: 14 August 1982 – 26 June 1983
- Champions: Partizan (9th title)
- Relegated: OFK Belgrade; Galenika Zemun
- European Cup: Partizan
- Cup Winners' Cup: Dinamo Zagreb
- UEFA Cup: Hajduk Split; Radnički Niš; Red Star
- Matches played: 306
- Goals scored: 826 (2.7 per match)
- Top goalscorer: Sulejman Halilović (18)
- Average attendance: 8,725

The 1982–1983 season of the Yugoslav First League, the then top football league in Yugoslavia was won by FK Partizan.

== Teams ==
=== Changes from last season ===
Teams promoted from 1981–82 Yugoslav Second League

- Dinamo Vinkovci
- Galenika Zemun

Teams relegated to 1982–83 Yugoslav Second League

- 17th place: Teteks
- 18th place: NK Zagreb

=== Overview ===
Locations of teams' home cities in the 1982–83 Yugoslav First League

Team	Home city	Federal Republic	Position in 1981–82
Budućnost	Titograd	SR Montenegro	8th
Red Star	Belgrade	SR Serbia	2nd
Dinamo Vinkovci	Vinkovci	SR Croatia	
Dinamo Zagreb	Zagreb	SR Croatia	1st
Galenika Zemun	Zemun	SR Serbia	
Hajduk Split	Split	SR Croatia	3rd
OFK Belgrade	Belgrade	SR Serbia	15th
Olimpija	Ljubljana	SR Slovenia	9th
Osijek	Osijek	SR Croatia	16th
Partizan	Belgrade	SR Serbia	6th
Radnički Niš	Niš	SR Serbia	11th
Rijeka	Rijeka	SR Croatia	12th
Sarajevo	Sarajevo	SR Bosnia and Herzegovina	4th
Sloboda	Tuzla	SR Bosnia and Herzegovina	13th
Vardar	Skopje	SR Macedonia	14th
Velež	Mostar	SR Bosnia and Herzegovina	7th
Vojvodina	Novi Sad	SR Serbia	10th
Željezničar	Sarajevo	SR Bosnia and Herzegovina	5th

== League table ==
Pos	Team	Pld	W	D	L	GF	GA	GD	Pts	Qualification or relegation
1	Partizan (C)	34	17	11	6	58	37	+21	45	Qualification for European Cup first round
2	Hajduk Split	34	14	15	5	51	33	+18	43	Qualification for UEFA Cup first round
3	Dinamo Zagreb	34	14	15	5	56	40	+16	43	Qualification for Cup Winners' Cup first round
4	Radnički Niš	34	15	10	9	45	39	+6	40	Qualification for UEFA Cup first round
5	Red Star Belgrade	34	13	11	10	55	50	+5	37	Qualification for UEFA Cup first round
6	Sloboda Tuzla	34	12	11	11	44	33	+11	35	Qualification for Intertoto Cup
7	Olimpija	34	11	13	10	33	31	+2	35	
8	Vardar	34	13	9	12	43	47	−4	35	
9	Vojvodina	34	12	10	12	38	60	−22	34	
10	Željezničar	34	11	11	12	41	40	+1	33	
11	Sarajevo	34	10	12	12	45	44	+1	32	
12	Dinamo Vinkovci	34	12	7	15	56	59	−3	31	
13	Velež	34	11	9	14	54	57	−3	31	
14	Budućnost	34	11	9	14	39	52	−13	31	
15	Rijeka	34	10	10	14	51	52	−1	30	
16	Osijek	34	11	7	16	48	51	−3	29	
17	OFK Belgrade (R)	34	9	10	15	38	45	−7	28	Relegation to Yugoslav Second League
18	Galenika Zemun (R)	34	4	12	18	31	56	−25	20	Relegation to Yugoslav Second League

Source: rsssf.org
Rules for classification: 1) points; 2) goal difference; 3) number of goals scored.
(C) Champions; (R) Relegated

== Results ==
Home \ Away	BUD	DVI	DZG	GAL	HAJ	OFK	OLI	OSI	PAR	RNI	RSB	RIJ	SAR	SLO	VAR	VEL	VOJ	ŽEL
Budućnost		2–0	2–0	1–1	1–0	1–0	1–0	1–1	3–2	1–1	2–1	1–5	3–3	1–0	2–0	4–1	2–2	2–1
Dinamo Vinkovci	2–0		1–1	2–2	1–1	1–0	2–0	3–0	1–1	4–1	2–3	3–1	2–0	2–1	4–1	2–0	4–1	2–1
Dinamo Zagreb	4–2	4–2		2–0	1–1	3–1	1–1	1–0	3–4	2–1	2–1	1–1	2–2	2–2	3–0	3–1	4–0	1–0
Galenika Zemun	1–1	0–0	0–2		1–1	2–2	2–3	2–1	1–3	0–0	2–2	3–1	3–1	0–2	0–0	3–5	0–1	1–2
Hajduk Split	4–1	4–2	2–2	1–1		1–1	2–0	2–1	1–0	4–1	0–0	1–0	1–1	3–1	1–3	1–1	3–0	2–0
OFK Belgrade	1–0	2–0	1–2	3–0	0–0		0–0	5–1	1–2	0–1	1–0	2–2	2–0	2–0	1–1	0–1	3–2	0–0
Olimpija	4–2	1–0	0–1	2–0	1–1	2–0		1–0	0–0	1–0	1–2	1–1	1–0	1–1	3–1	3–1	0–0	0–0
Osijek	3–0	4–2	2–2	1–0	1–2	2–3	1–3		1–0	1–1	2–3	2–0	1–0	2–2	3–0	3–2	5–0	1–0
Partizan	0–0	3–1	2–2	2–0	2–0	2–1	2–0	3–1		3–1	3–2	2–0	0–1	1–0	4–0	1–1	5–0	2–1
Radnički Niš	2–0	1–0	1–1	2–0	1–1	1–1	1–0	1–0	0–0		2–0	2–1	2–1	1–1	2–0	3–2	4–0	3–2
Red Star	1–0	2–2	1–1	1–2	1–2	4–1	1–1	1–0	1–1	3–1		2–1	1–4	1–0	2–1	6–4	3–2	2–2
Rijeka	2–0	6–3	1–1	3–2	1–1	2–0	2–1	5–2	2–2	1–1	1–0		3–0	1–1	1–2	2–1	0–0	0–1
Sarajevo	2–0	4–1	1–1	2–0	1–3	1–1	2–0	1–1	3–1	1–2	1–1	2–1		1–1	2–1	4–2	0–0	0–0
Sloboda Tuzla	2–1	4–1	2–0	0–0	1–0	2–1	1–1	0–0	1–2	2–1	2–0	1–1	2–1		0–0	3–0	5–0	3–0
Vardar	0–0	4–3	2–1	1–0	2–1	3–0	0–0	2–1	5–0	2–1	1–1	1–0	1–1	1–0		1–2	0–0	3–0
Velež	3–1	1–1	3–0	3–1	0–0	3–0	2–0	0–2	1–1	1–1	2–2	3–1	1–1	1–0	2–2		1–2	3–1
Vojvodina	2–0	1–0	0–0	3–1	1–2	3–2	0–0	0–0	1–1	0–1	1–1	4–2	2–1	2–1	3–2	1–0		2–1
Željezničar	1–1	2–0	0–0	0–0	2–2	0–0	1–1	3–2	1–1	3–1	0–3	3–0	1–0	2–0	3–0	1–0	6–2	

Source: DataSoccer.it
Legend: Blue = home team win; Yellow = draw; Red = away team win.

== Winning squad ==
- PARTIZAN (coach Miloš Milutinović)

Player	Apps	Goals
(Socialist Federal Republic of Yugoslavia) Ljubomir Radanović	34	3
(Socialist Federal Republic of Yugoslavia) Aleksandar Trifunović	32	9
(Socialist Federal Republic of Yugoslavia) Momčilo Vukotić	32	5
(Socialist Federal Republic of Yugoslavia) Slobodan Rojević	32	1
(Socialist Federal Republic of Yugoslavia) Dragan Mance	30	15
(Socialist Federal Republic of Yugoslavia) Miodrag Ješić	27	1
(Socialist Federal Republic of Yugoslavia) Miodrag Radović	25	1
(Socialist Federal Republic of Yugoslavia) Zvonko Živković	23	9
(Socialist Federal Republic of Yugoslavia) Zoran Dimitrijević	23	2
(Socialist Federal Republic of Yugoslavia) Nenad Stojković	23	1
(Socialist Federal Republic of Yugoslavia) Admir Smajić	22	0
(Socialist Federal Republic of Yugoslavia) Nikica Klinčarski	21	2
(Socialist Federal Republic of Yugoslavia) Zvonko Varga	20	3
(Socialist Federal Republic of Yugoslavia) Rade Zalad	20	0
(Socialist Federal Republic of Yugoslavia) Dževad Prekazi	19	4
(Socialist Federal Republic of Yugoslavia) Ranko Stojić	16	0
(Socialist Federal Republic of Yugoslavia) Sead Sarajlić	11	0
(Socialist Federal Republic of Yugoslavia) Zvonko Popović	10	1
(Socialist Federal Republic of Yugoslavia) Miloš Đelmaš	6	0
(Socialist Federal Republic of Yugoslavia) Novica Kostić	2	0
(Socialist Federal Republic of Yugoslavia) Stevica Kuzmanovski	2	0
(Socialist Federal Republic of Yugoslavia) Slobodan Pavković	2	0
(Socialist Federal Republic of Yugoslavia) Sead Mašić	2	0
(Socialist Federal Republic of Yugoslavia) Radomir Radulović	1	0
(Socialist Federal Republic of Yugoslavia) Zoran Lilić	1	0

== Top scorers ==
Rank	Scorer	Club	Goals
1	(Socialist Federal Republic of Yugoslavia) Sulejman Halilović	Dinamo Vinkovci	18
2	(Socialist Federal Republic of Yugoslavia) Dragan Mance	Partizan	15
3	(Socialist Federal Republic of Yugoslavia) Vladimir Skočajić	Velež	14
4	(Socialist Federal Republic of Yugoslavia) Zlatko Kranjčar	Dinamo Zagreb	13
4	(Socialist Federal Republic of Yugoslavia) Dušan Savić	Red Star	13
6	(Socialist Federal Republic of Yugoslavia) Dušan Mitošević	Radnički Niš	12
7	(Socialist Federal Republic of Yugoslavia) Dušan Bajević	Velež	11
7	(Socialist Federal Republic of Yugoslavia) Ivan Cvjetković	Sloboda Tuzla	11
7	(Socialist Federal Republic of Yugoslavia) Damir Desnica	Rijeka	11
7	(Socialist Federal Republic of Yugoslavia) Mersad Kovačević	Sloboda Tuzla	11
7	(Socialist Federal Republic of Yugoslavia) Dušan Pešić	Hajduk Split	11

== Attendance ==
Club	Average home attendance	Average away attendance
Dinamo Zagreb	25,471	17,353
FK Partizan	22,000	20,412
Red Star Belgrade	15,765	16,412
Hajduk Split	15,353	12,765
FK Vardar	9,353	6,118
FK Sarajevo	7,529	7,059
FK Željezničar	6,765	7,000
Radnički Niš	6,765	6,588
FK Vojvodina	6,471	6,118
Dinamo Vinkovci	6,176	7,588
NK Osijek	5,824	5,647
NK Rijeka	5,059	5,529
FK Velež	5,000	8,529
NK Olimpija	4,824	7,059
Budućnost Titograd	4,529	5,118
Sloboda Tuzla	3,824	5,000
Galenika Zemun	3,588	5,294
OFK Beograd	2,765	7,471

- Overall league attendance per match: 8,725 spectators

== See also ==
- 1982–83 Yugoslav Second League
- 1982–83 Yugoslav Cup
