= Miroslav Polak =

Serbian footballer (born 1958)

Personal information
- Date of birth: 8 February 1958 (age 68)
- Place of birth: Belgrade, SFR Yugoslavia
- Position: Midfielder

Youth career
- Čukarički

Senior career*
Years	Team	Apps	(Gls)
1976–1978	Partizan	9	(0)
1978–1986	Rad	173	(12)
1986–1987	Malmö FF		
1987–1988	Panionios	8	(2)
1988–1990	SV Salzburg		
1990–1991	FC Puch		

Managerial career
- 1990–1991: FC Puch
- 1991–1995: BNZ Salzburg
- 1995–1996: FK Austria Amateure
- 1996–1997: BNZ Salzburg U18
- 1997–1998: SV Braunau
- 2000: SV Salzburg
- 2001–2003: TSV St. Johann
- 2004–2007: TSV St. Johann (sports director)
- 2007–2010: FC Puch
- 2013–2014: Austria Salzburg
- 2016–2018: SK Bischofshofen
- 2018: SB Chiemgau Traunstein
- 2019-2020: USV Lamprechtshausen
- * Club domestic league appearances and goals

Miroslav Polak (Serbian Cyrillic: Мирослав Полак; born 8 February 1958) is a Serbian football manager and former player.

== Playing career ==
Born in Belgrade, SR Serbia, then Yugoslav capital, Miroslav "Mirko" Polak initially played in the youth team of FK Čukarički. He then played with Yugoslav giants FK Partizan between 1976 and 1978. Then he moved to FK Rad playing with them in the Yugoslav First and Second leagues until 1986 when he moved abroad to Sweden joining Malmö FF. After one season in Sweden and one in Greece paying with Panionios, he moves to Austria where he plays with SV Salzburg between 1988 and 1990.

== Managerial career ==
In 1990, he joins another Austrian side, FC Puch where he becomes player-manager. That was the end of his playing career and the start of a long career as a coach in Austria.

Nowadays he is the Coach of the Bavarian club SB Chiemgau Traunstein, playing in Landesliga Bayern
