= Vlada Pejović =

Serbian football manager and player

Personal information
- Full name: Vladimir Pejović
- Date of birth: 6 April 1950 (age 76)
- Place of birth: Belgrade, PR Serbia, FPR Yugoslavia
- Position: Defender

Senior career*
Years	Team	Apps	(Gls)
1967–1978	Partizan	168	(0)
1978–1984	Galenika Zemun	119	(4)
Total		287	(4)

Managerial career
- 1988–1991: Zemun
- 1992: OFK Kikinda
- 1994: Zemun
- 1994: Zemun
- 1997–1998: Floriana
- 1998–1999: Birkirkara
- 2000: Sliema Wanderers
- 2000–2001: Sliema Wanderers
- * Club domestic league appearances and goals

Vlada Pejović (Serbian Cyrillic: Влада Пејовић; born 6 April 1950) is a Serbian former football manager and player.

== Playing career ==
Born in Belgrade, Pejović started out at Partizan, making his debut in the 1967–68 season. He amassed a total of 168 league appearances for the football club over the next decade. In 1978, Pejović signed with Yugoslav Second League side Galenika Zemun.

== Managerial career ==
After starting his managerial career at Zemun, Pejović moved abroad to Malta and worked with several clubs, including Birkirkara.

== Honours ==
Partizan

- Yugoslav First League: 1975–76, 1977–78
- Mitropa Cup: 1977–78

Galenika Zemun

- Yugoslav Second League: 1981–82
