= Milovan Jović =

Serbian footballer

Personal information
- Full name: Milovan Jović
- Date of birth: 5 February 1955
- Place of birth: Belgrade, FPR Yugoslavia
- Date of death: 8 June 2009 (aged 54)
- Place of death: Belgrade, Serbia
- Position: Forward

Senior career*
Years	Team	Apps	(Gls)
1975–1977	Rad	66	(37)
1977–1980	Partizan	36	(6)
1980–1981	Trepča	6	(0)
1981–1982	OFK Beograd	2	(0)
1982	Elche	2	(0)
- * Club domestic league appearances and goals

Milovan Jović (Serbian Cyrillic: Милован Јовић; 5 February 1955 – 8 June 2009) was a Serbian footballer most notably with FK Partizan.

He died on 8 June 2009 after a long illness.

== Honours ==
Partizan

- Yugoslav First League: 1977–78
