= Ilija Zavišić =

Yugoslav footballer

Personal information
- Full name: Ilija Zavišić
- Date of birth: 10 January 1952 (age 74)
- Place of birth: Donji Milanovac, FPR Yugoslavia
- Height: 1.72 m (5 ft 7 1/2 in)
- Position: Winger

Senior career*
Years	Team	Apps	(Gls)
1968–1971	Hajduk Veljko		
1971–1980	Partizan	173	(26)
1972–1973	→ Bor (loan)	33	(5)
1980–1984	Eintracht Braunschweig	86	(19)
1984–1986	Rad	45	(7)
Total		337	(57)

International career
1976–1978	Yugoslavia	9	(0)
- * Club domestic league appearances and goals

Ilija Zavišić (Serbian Cyrillic: Илија Завишић; born 10 January 1952) is a Yugoslav retired footballer who played as a midfielder. He earned 9 caps for Yugoslavia in the second half of the 1970s.

He played 173 league games for Partizan, winning two league titles with them.

After retiring from the game, Zavišić worked in Partizan's youth setup. His younger son, Bojan, also played for the Crno-beli.

== Honours ==
Partizan

- Yugoslav First League: 1975–76, 1977–78
- Mitropa Cup: 1977–78
