= Jusuf Hatunić =

Bosnian association footballer (1950–1991)

Personal information
- Date of birth: 17 October 1950
- Place of birth: Lukavac, FPR Yugoslavia
- Date of death: 11 May 1991 (aged 40)
- Place of death: Belgrade, SFR Yugoslavia
- Position: Defensive midfielder

Youth career
- Željezničar Dobošnica

Senior career*
| Years | Team | Apps | (Gls) |
| 1969–1976 | Sloboda Tuzla | 133 | (14) |
| 1976–1978 | Partizan | 69 | (0) |
| 1978–1979 | Galatasaray | 4 | (0) |
| 1979–1981 | Partizan | 38 | (0) |
| 1981–1983 | Rad | 14 | (0) |

International career
| 1972–1978 | Yugoslavia | 8 | (0) |
- * Club domestic league appearances and goals

Jusuf "Musa" Hatunić (pronounced [jǔsuf mûsa xǎtunitɕ]; 17 October 1950 – 11 May 1991) was a Yugoslav footballer from Bosnia and Herzegovina.

== Club career ==
He was a player of Yugoslav First League clubs Sloboda Tuzla (1969–1976) and FK Partizan (1976–1981), with short spells with Turkish club Galatasaray (1979) and Yugoslav Second League club FK Rad (1981–1983) where he ended his playing career.

His son Jusmir Hatunić played for Partizan and Rad as well but as a goalkeeper.

== International career ==
He made his debut for Yugoslavia in a June 1972 friendly match against Venezuela and has earned a total of 8 caps, scoring no goals. His final international was a May 1978 friendly match against Italy.

== Honours ==
Partizan

- Yugoslav First League: 1977–78
