= Boriša Đorđević =

Serbian footballer

Personal information
- Full name: Borislav Đorđević
- Date of birth: 30 October 1953 (age 73)
- Place of birth: Bor, SFR Yugoslavia
- Height: 1.77 m (5 ft 10 in)
- Position: Forward

Senior career*
Years	Team	Apps	(Gls)
1970–1975	Bor	109	(17)
1975–1981	Hajduk Split	150	(27)
1981–1983	Hamburger SV	9	(0)
1983–1984	TeBe Berlin	6	(0)
1984–1986	Altona 93		

International career
1976–1977	Yugoslavia	5	(0)
- * Club domestic league appearances and goals

Borislav "Boriša" Đorđević (Serbian Cyrillic: Борислав Бориша Ђорђевић; born 30 October 1953) is a Serbian former professional footballer who played as a forward. He spent two seasons in the Bundesliga with Hamburger SV.

== International career ==
At international level, Đorđević made his debut for Yugoslavia in a May 1976 European Championship qualification match away against Wales and earned a total of 5 caps (no goals). His final international was an October 1977 friendly match away against Hungary.

== Honours ==
Hajduk Split

- Yugoslav First League: 1978–79
- Yugoslav Cup: 1975–76, 1976–77

Hamburger SV

- Bundesliga: 1981–82, 1982–83
- European Cup: 1982–83
- UEFA Cup runners-up: 1981–82
