= Radmilo Ivančević =

Serbian footballer and manager

Personal information
- Date of birth: 4 September 1950 (age 76)
- Place of birth: Gornji Milanovac, FPR Yugoslavia
- Height: 1.83 m (6 ft 0 in)
- Position: Goalkeeper

Senior career*
Years	Team	Apps	(Gls)
1967–1970	Takovo		
1970–1975	Šumadija Aranđelovac		
1975–1977	Partizan	39	(0)
1977–1979	Fenerbahçe	55	(0)
1979–1981	Partizan	27	(0)
1982–1983	Cleveland Force (indoor)	17	(0)

International career
	Yugoslavia Olympic	5	(0)

Managerial career
- 1983–1984: Šumadija Aranđelovac
- 1984–1988: Kazma
- 1988–1990: Kuwait (assistant)
- 1990–1991: Partizan (GK coach)
- 1991–1993: Kuwait Olympic (assistant)
- 1993–1995: Real Oviedo (assistant)
- 1995–1998: Atlético Madrid (deputy director)
- 1998: Sakaryaspor
- 1999: Radnicki Niš
- 1999–2000: AEK Larnaca
- 2000: OFK Beograd
- 2000–2001: Real Oviedo (GK coach)
- 2002: Consadole Sapporo
- 2002–2003: AEP Paphos
- 2004: Obilić
- 2004–2005: Rad
- 2006–2007: Makedonija Gjorče Petrov
- 2007–2008: Smederevo
- 2008: Kuwait SC
- 2009–2010: Alki Larnaca
- 2010–2011: Atromitos Yeroskipou
- 2011–2013: Alki Larnaca
- 2013–2014: Radnički Kragujevac
- 2014: Pafos FC
- 2015: Novi Pazar
- * Club domestic league appearances and goals

Radmilo Ivančević (Serbian Cyrillic: Радмило Иванчевић; born 4 September 1950) is a Serbian football manager and former footballer.

== Coaching career ==
Ivančević's career began in 1983 as manager of Serbian amateur club Šumadija Aranđelovac, he then moved on to train the Kazma SC in Kuwait in 1984 and remained there until 1988, after which he assumed position as assistant manager of the Kuwait national football team.

Since then, the Serb has worked with Radomir Antić in Spain and trained a number of Serbian and International teams, and a number of teams in Japan, Turkey, Macedonia and Cyprus, ending in with his latest post in Pafos FC from July to October 2014.

== Managerial statistics ==
Team	From	To	Record				
Team	From	To	G	W	D	L	Win %
Consadole Sapporo	2002	2002	11	1	1	9	9.09
Total			11	1	1	9	9.09
