= Ivan Golac =

Serbian footballer (born 1950)

Personal information
- Full name: Ivan Golac
- Date of birth: 15 June 1950 (age 76)
- Place of birth: Koprivnica, PR Croatia, FPR Yugoslavia
- Height: 5 ft 10 in (1.78 m)
- Position: Right-back

Youth career
- Bežanija
- Partizan
- Rad

Senior career*
Years	Team	Apps	(Gls)
1967–1971	Rad		
1971–1978	Partizan	120	(3)
1978–1983	Southampton	144	(4)
1982	→ Bournemouth (loan)	9	(0)
1983	→ Manchester City (loan)	2	(0)
1983–1984	Belasica	1	(0)
1984–1986	Southampton	24	(0)
1985	→ Portsmouth (loan)	8	(0)
Total		308	(7)

International career
1976	Yugoslavia	1	(0)

Managerial career
- 1988: Mačva Šabac
- 1989–1990: Partizan
- 1992: Torquay United
- 1993: Mačva Šabac
- 1993–1995: Dundee United
- 1997: ÍA Akranes
- 1999: Sartid Smederevo
- 2002–2003: Karpaty Lviv
- * Club domestic league appearances and goals

Ivan Golac (Serbian Cyrillic: Иван Голац, pronounced [ǐvan gô:lats]; born 15 June 1950) is a Serbian and Yugoslav former professional football player and manager.

A Yugoslav international right-back, he is best known as a player and manager of FK Partizan, of Belgrade. In England he is remembered as one of Southampton's first foreign imports and as a Scottish Cup-winning manager with Dundee United.

== Playing career ==
=== Partizan ===
Golac was born in Koprivnica in PR Croatia, then part of FPR Yugoslavia, to Croat parents Ivan, who was a soldier in President Tito's guard, and Marija, both of whom hail from Lič in Gorski Kotar. His family moved to Belgrade in 1952, where he began playing football at FK Bežanija. In 1962, he joined FK Partizan's youth system but soon left following the tragic deaths of his coaches, Bruno Belin and Čedomir Lazarević, in a car accident. He subsequently joined FK Rad, where he made his senior debut at the age of 17. In 1971, he returned to Partizan. He made over 350 appearances for the club and won League championship medals in 1976 and 1978. During this era, he also made his debut for the national team, but that match against Algeria in 1976 proved to be his only one at international level.

"The Yugoslavian League was one of the best in the world; every game was really tough. It was a kind of war because there was a lot of talent and ambition. We had a very good crowd for all the games and more or less all the clubs, especially Partizan Belgrade, Red Star Belgrade and Dinamo Zagreb. You could put them among the ten biggest derbies in the world ... we would play in front of crowds of 90–100,000"

=== Southampton ===
The year of 1978 would prove to be a watershed in Golac's career. He had reached the age of 28, when Yugoslavia's Communist authorities would allow players to move abroad; it was also the year in which English football's restrictions on foreign players were lifted.

Golac was transferred to Southampton in August 1978 for a fee of £50,000, initially on a non-contract basis until problems obtaining a work permit were resolved, before signing a permanent contract in September. He made his Football League debut for them on 22 August 1978 against Bolton Wanderers, and he went on to play 144 League games in his first spell with the club.

He immediately became the established right-back, rarely missing a game over the next four seasons. The Dell crowd soon warmed to his "swashbuckling, surging style along the touchline" and he was voted the "Saints" Player of the Year in 1981 although, according to manager Lawrie McMenemy he had a tendency to "go missing" in away matches.

The relationship turned sour in 1982 when a contract dispute between player and club led to Golac going out on loan to AFC Bournemouth in November 1982 and Manchester City in March 1983, before his contract with Southampton was terminated. After a brief spell back in Yugoslavia with minor level club FK Belasica he returned to Southampton in March 1984, helping the Saints finish as runners-up to Liverpool in the Football League. The following season, he lost his place to Mark Dennis and after another period on loan, this time at Portsmouth, Golac retired in 1986, having played 197 games for Southampton, scoring four goals.

Writing in the Southern Daily Echo in April 2003, McMenemy said:

"He was a terrific professional who trained well and loved 5-a-sides particularly in the small gym at The Dell where even the best players took time to get acclimatized to the speed of the action."

Of his time with Southampton, Golac said:

"Beautiful football, beautiful supporters and beautiful days. From day one, from the very first kick, I could sense a connection with the crowd. They were terrific."

"There was fire on the park – The Dell was always in flames and a lot of the opponents from London, Manchester and Liverpool just couldn't stand the heat."

== Managerial career ==
Following the end of his playing days, Golac turned to coaching, where his laid-back, positive style led to further successes. Returning to Partizan, he became assistant to manager Momčilo Vukotić in 1989 and helped the club to Yugoslav Cup success that year.

The following September, Golac had an extraordinary debut in management when Vukotić was taken ill on the eve of a Cup Winners' Cup first round tie against Celtic in Glasgow, with Partizan leading 2–1 from the first leg. An astonishing match saw Golac's team progress on away goals after a 5–4 victory for Celtic. Golac remained in charge at Partizan for the rest of the season before parting company with the club.

He still had a home in Hampshire, and returned to Britain in search of work. After being unsuccessfully shortlisted for the manager's job at old adversaries Celtic, he had a brief spell in charge of Torquay United during 1992. Then, in July 1993, he was announced as the surprise choice to succeed legendary Dundee United manager Jim McLean.

The Scottish sporting media quickly latched on to Golac, whose hippyish public image – he took United players to "smell the flowers" in Camperdown Park during training sessions, and claimed to have learned English from listening to Rolling Stones records – was in pointed contrast to the austere reputation of his predecessor, McLean. Against the odds, Golac's confident approach led underdogs United to Scottish Cup success at the end of his first season in charge, defeating hot favourites Rangers 1–0 in the final. It was the first time Dundee United had won the trophy, having lost in the final six times under McLean.

Despite the Cup triumph, poor League form and the fraught relationship between Golac and McLean (who remained club chairman) led to his departure from the club less than a year later. Since then, he has held several managerial posts around Europe without recording any significant achievements, having been in charge at ÍA Akranes from Iceland in 1997, Sartid Smederevo in Serbia and Karpaty Lviv in Ukraine. In January 1994, he had been linked with Southampton for a possible return as manager following the departure of Ian Branfoot, but the job went to Alan Ball instead.

== Personal life ==
Outside of football, Golac also had a spell running a chocolate factory in Belgrade. He is married to Bratislava, with daughters Andrijana and Ivana, and they have homes in Belgrade and Vienna.

== Honours ==
=== Player ===
Partizan

- Yugoslav First League: 1975–76, 1977–78

Southampton

- Football League Cup runner-up: 1978–79

=== Manager ===
Dundee United

- Scottish Cup: 1993–94
