= Pavle Grubješić =

Yugoslav and Serbian footballer

Personal information
- Full name: Pavle Grubješić
- Date of birth: 12 March 1953
- Place of birth: Šabac, PR Serbia, FPR Yugoslavia
- Date of death: 23 January 1999 (aged 45)
- Place of death: Šabac, Serbia, FR Yugoslavia
- Position: Forward

Youth career
- Mačva Šabac

Senior career*
Years	Team	Apps	(Gls)
1970–1981	Partizan	131	(26)
1972–1974	→ Radnički Niš (loan)	61	(12)
1981–1982	Grazer AK	7	(0)
Total		199	(38)

International career
1971	Yugoslavia U18	3	(1)
- * Club domestic league appearances and goals

Pavle Grubješić (Serbian Cyrillic: Павле Грубјешић; 12 March 1953 – 23 January 1999) was a Yugoslav and Serbian professional footballer who played as a forward.

== Club career ==
After starting out at Mačva Šabac, Grubješić went to Partizan in 1970 at the age of 17 and spent two seasons with the club, before going on loan to Radnički Niš. He returned to Partizan in the summer of 1974 and signed a new contract with the club. There, Grubješić became a member of the squad that won two Yugoslav First League titles between 1976 and 1978. He was also the team's top scorer in the 1976–77 season with 14 goals and subsequently helped the side win the Mitropa Cup in the following campaign. In the summer of 1981, Grubješić moved abroad to Austria and briefly played for Grazer AK.

== International career ==
At international level, Grubješić represented Yugoslavia at the 1971 UEFA European Under-18 Championship.

== Personal life ==
Grubješić died of a heart attack on 23 January 1999 at the age of 45. He was survived by his son, Nikola, who later followed in his father's footsteps and played for Partizan.

== Honours ==
Partizan

- Yugoslav First League: 1975–76, 1977–78
- Mitropa Cup: 1977–78
