= Aranđel Todorović =

Serbian footballer

Personal information
- Full name: Aranđel Todorović
- Date of birth: 22 September 1955 (age 71)
- Place of birth: Belgrade, FPR Yugoslavia
- Height: 1.75 m (5 ft 9 in)
- Position: Midfielder

Youth career
- Partizan

Senior career*
Years	Team	Apps	(Gls)
1973–1979	Partizan	87	(2)
1978	→ Osijek (loan)	26	(4)
1980–1983	Rad	62	(3)
1985–1986	Sète	29	(2)
1986–1987	Martigues	18	(1)
Total		207	(12)

International career
1972–1974	Yugoslavia U18	7	(0)

Managerial career
- Zvezdara
- * Club domestic league appearances and goals

Aranđel Todorović (Serbian Cyrillic: Аранђел Тодоровић; born 22 September 1955) is a Serbian retired professional footballer who played as a midfielder.

He started his career at local giants Partizan Belgrade.

Todorović represented Yugoslavia at the 1974 UEFA European Under-18 Championship.

== Honours ==
Partizan

- Yugoslav First League: 1975–76
