= Rešad Kunovac =

Bosnian football coach

- Kunovac in 2010

Personal information
- Date of birth: 24 August 1953 (age 73)
- Place of birth: Foča, FPR Yugoslavia
- Position: Defender

Youth career
- Sutjeska Foča

Senior career*
Years	Team	Apps	(Gls)
- Sutjeska Foča
1971–1975	Sloboda Titovo Užice		
1975–1980	Partizan	100	(4)
1981	Napredak Kruševac	12	(0)
1981–1983	Memphis Americans (indoor)	65	(51)
1983–1985	Baltimore Blast (indoor)	46	(7)

Managerial career
- 1990: Yugoslavia U16 (assistant)
- 1995–1998: Atlético de Madrid (assistant)
- 2001: FR Yugoslavia (assistant)
- 2003: Barcelona (assistant)
- 2008–2010: Serbia (assistant)
- 2013: Shandong Luneng (assistant)
- 2015: Hebei China Fortune (assistant)
- * Club domestic league appearances and goals

Rešad Kunovac (born 24 August 1953) is a Bosnian football coach and former player. He was the assistant to Radomir Antić, the head coach of the Serbia national team at the 2010 FIFA World Cup.

== Playing career ==
He started his career playing for FK Sutjeska Foča and FK Sloboda Užice in late 1960s, and later moved on to FK Partizan, where he took the championship crown in the 1975–76 and 1977–78 Yugoslav First League season and also won Mitropa Cup in 1978. He also played with FK Napredak Kruševac.

He played in the Major Indoor Soccer League in the United States under the name of Ray Kunovac.

== Managerial career ==
After ending his playing career, Kunovac became a long-term assistant coach of Radomir Antić at Atlético de Madrid, FC Barcelona and Real Oviedo. In 2001, he was an assistant coach to Milovan Đorić, head coach of the FR Yugoslavia national football team. He was an assistant coach to Mirko Jozić at the 1990 UEFA European Under-16 Championship.

Sporting positions
Preceded by Andries Jonker	FC Barcelona assistant manager 2003	Succeeded by Henk ten Cate
