= Boško Đorđević =

Serbian footballer (1953–2026)

Personal information
- Date of birth: 22 August 1953
- Place of birth: Belgrade, PR Serbia, FPR Yugoslavia
- Date of death: 25 February 2026 (aged 72)
- Place of death: Belgrade, Serbia
- Position: Forward

Senior career*
Years	Team	Apps	(Gls)
1974–1979	Partizan	120	(35)
1980–1981	Rad	26	(5)
1981–1983	SG Union Solingen	10	(2)
Total		156	(42)

Managerial career
- Železnik
- 1994: Vrbas
- * Club domestic league appearances and goals

Boško Đorđević (Serbian Cyrillic: Бошко Ђорђевић; 22 August 1953 – 25 February 2026) was a Serbian footballer who played as a forward. He was mainly known for spending five and a half seasons with FK Partizan between 1974 and the winter of 1979, with whom he won the 1975–76, 1977–78 Yugoslav First League and Mitropa Cup in 1978.

Along with Dušan Savić, Đorđević was joint top scorer of the league in the 1974–75 season with 20 goals in 29 league appearances, while Partizan finished that season sixth, with 12 points behind champions Hajduk Split.

After leaving Partizan in the winter break of the 1979–80 season, Đorđević had a brief spell with FK Rad in the Yugoslav Second League before moving abroad and joining 2. Bundesliga side SG Union Solingen. He only appeared in 10 league matches for Solingen in the following two seasons, before retiring in 1983.

Đorđević died on 25 February 2026, at the age of 72.
