= Predrag Tomić =

Serbian footballer

Personal information
- Full name: Predrag Tomić
- Date of birth: 20 October 1953 (age 73)
- Place of birth: Belgrade, FPR Yugoslavia
- Position: Defender

Senior career*
Years	Team	Apps	(Gls)
1974–1977	Partizan	38	(1)
1977–1981	Olimpija Ljubljana	98	(1)
1981–1983	OFK Beograd	25	(0)
Total		161	(2)
- * Club domestic league appearances and goals

Predrag Tomić (Serbian Cyrillic: Предраг Томић; born 20 October 1953) is a Serbian retired footballer.
