= Dragan Arsenović =

Serbian footballer

Personal information
- Full name: Dragan Arsenović
- Date of birth: 6 October 1952
- Place of birth: Šabac, FPR Yugoslavia
- Date of death: 7 March 2004 (aged 51)
- Place of death: Belgrade, Serbia and Montenegro
- Position: Defender

Senior career*
Years	Team	Apps	(Gls)
1970–1974	Mačva Šabac		
1975–1980	Partizan	53	(1)
1980–1983	Rad	74	(0)
- * Club domestic league appearances and goals

Dragan Arsenović (Serbian Cyrillic: Драган Арсеновић; 6 October 1952 – 7 March 2004) was a Serbian footballer.
