= Nenad Stojković =

Serbian football manager and player

Personal information
- Date of birth: 26 May 1956 (age 70)
- Place of birth: Široko, PR Serbia, FPR Yugoslavia
- Height: 1.83 m (6 ft 0 in)
- Position: Defender

Youth career
- Liria
- 1972–1974: Partizan

Senior career*
Years	Team	Apps	(Gls)
1974–1984	Partizan	245	(8)
1984–1986	Monaco	69	(2)
1986–1988	Montpellier	70	(7)
1988–1990	Mulhouse	66	(1)
1990–1991	Nancy	37	(2)
1991–1992	Amiens	22	(1)
Total		509	(21)

International career
1976–1978	Yugoslavia U21	8	(0)
1977–1984	Yugoslavia	32	(1)

Managerial career
- 2003: Cannes
- 2010: Radnički Obrenovac
Medal record
Gold medal – first place	UEFA Under-21 Championship	1978
- * Club domestic league appearances and goals

Nenad Stojković (Serbian Cyrillic: Ненад Стојковић; born 26 May 1956) is a Serbian retired football manager and player.

== Club career ==
During his 18-year professional career, Stojković played for Partizan (1974–1984), Monaco (1984–1986), Montpellier (1986–1988), Mulhouse (1988–1990), Nancy (1990–1991), and Amiens (1991–1992), amassing over 500 league appearances.

== International career ==
At youth level, Stojković was a member of the Yugoslavia under-21 squad that won the 1978 UEFA Under-21 Championship.

At full level, Stojković represented Yugoslavia between 1977 and 1984, collecting 32 caps and scoring once. He appeared at the 1982 FIFA World Cup and UEFA Euro 1984, playing the full 90 minutes in all three of his team's games in each tournament.

== Managerial career ==
After hanging up his boots, Stojković briefly served as manager of Championnat National side Cannes, following his appointment in January 2003. He was also manager of Serbian League Belgrade club Radnički Obrenovac in the first half of the 2010–11 season.

== Career statistics ==
Appearances and goals by national team and year
National team	Year	Apps	Goals
Yugoslavia	1977	6	0
Yugoslavia	1978	3	0
Yugoslavia	1979	4	0
Yugoslavia	1980	0	0
Yugoslavia	1981	6	0
Yugoslavia	1982	6	1
Yugoslavia	1983	1	0
Yugoslavia	1984	6	0
Total		32	1

== Honours ==
Partizan

- Yugoslav First League: 1975–76, 1977–78, 1982–83
- Mitropa Cup: 1977–78

Monaco

- Coupe de France: 1984–85

Montpellier

- French Division 2: 1986–87

Yugoslavia U21

- UEFA Under-21 Championship: 1978
