= Dževad Prekazi =

Yugoslav footballer (1957–2026)

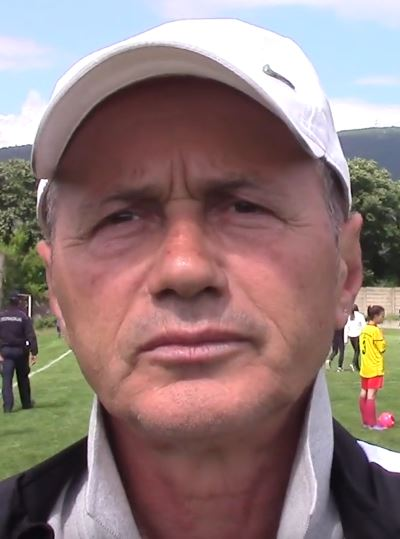
- Prekazi in 2017

Personal information
- Full name: Dževad Prekazi
- Date of birth: 18 August 1957
- Place of birth: Kosovska Mitrovica, PR Serbia, FPR Yugoslavia
- Date of death: 8 November 2026 (aged 69)
- Place of death: Belgrade, Serbia
- Height: 1.78 m (5 ft 10 in)
- Position: Midfielder

Youth career
- 1974: Remont Titova Mitrovica
- 1974–1976: Partizan

Senior career*
Years	Team	Apps	(Gls)
1976–1983	Partizan	153	(19)
1984	Hajduk Split	20	(3)
1985	Baltimore Blast (indoor)	8	(1)
1985–1991	Galatasaray	185	(40)
1991–1992	Altay	8	(1)
1992	Bakırköyspor	6	(1)
1993	Trudbenik		
Total		380	(65)

International career
1976–1977	Yugoslavia U21 (Note: Official UEFA matches only)	3	(1)

Managerial career
- 1997: Železnik
- 2000: Železnik
- * Club domestic league appearances and goals

Dževad Prekazi (Serbian Cyrillic: Џевад Прекази, Albanian: Xhevat Prekazi, Turkish: Cevat Prekazi; 18 August 1957 – 8 November 2026) was a Yugoslav professional footballer who played as a midfielder.

== Club career ==
Born in Kosovska Mitrovica, Prekazi made his first football steps at his local club Remont, being registered for their youth team in early 1974. He soon gained attention as one of the most promising young talents in Yugoslav football and signed with Partizan in December 1974. With the Crno-beli, Prekazi won the Yugoslav First League three times (1975–76, 1977–78, and 1982–83).

In the 1984 winter transfer window, Prekazi switched to fellow Yugoslav First League club Hajduk Split. He spent about a year at Poljud and won the 1983–84 Yugoslav Cup, before moving to the United States and joining the Baltimore Blast of the Major Indoor Soccer League.

In the summer of 1985, Prekazi returned to Europe and signed with Turkish side Galatasaray. He played for the club over the next six and a half years, collecting 185 league appearances and scoring 40 goals, while helping them win back-to-back championship titles in 1986–87 and 1987–88.

In late 1991, Prekazi departed Galatasaray and joined Altay until the end of the 1991–92 season. He also briefly played for Bakırköyspor in the fall of 1992. After returning to Yugoslavia, Prekazi ended his playing career with Trudbenik in the Serbian League North.

== International career ==
Prekazi represented Yugoslavia at the 1976 UEFA European Under-18 Championship. He was also capped for Yugoslavia at under-21 level.

== Post-playing career ==
After hanging up his boots, Prekazi served as manager of Železnik on two occasions. He also worked in the youth setups at Sinđelić Beograd, OFK Beograd, and Partizan.

== Personal life and death ==
Born to Kosovo Albanian parents, Prekazi identified as Yugoslav. He also held Turkish citizenship. His older brother, Luan, also played for Partizan.

Prekazi married his wife, Jelica, at a young age, and the couple remained married until her death in 2021 Two years after losing his wife, Prekazi suffered a brain hemorrhage in 2023, which put him at serious risk of paralysis He subsequently underwent prolonged medical treatment in Belgrade.

Prekazi died on 8 November 2026, at the age of 69. He was buried at Lešće Cemetery in Belgrade.

== Career statistics ==
Appearances and goals by club, season and competition
Club	Season	League	
Club	Season	Apps	Goals
Partizan	1975–76	3	0
Partizan	1976–77	28	5
Partizan	1977–78	22	2
Partizan	1978–79	30	2
Partizan	1979–80	23	4
Partizan	1980–81	17	1
Partizan	1981–82	0	0
Partizan	1982–83	19	4
Partizan	1983–84	11	1
Partizan	Total	153	19
Hajduk Split	1983–84	12	2
Hajduk Split	1984–85	8	1
Hajduk Split	Total	20	3
Baltimore Blast (indoor)	1984–85	8	1
Galatasaray	1985–86	35	9
Galatasaray	1986–87	34	5
Galatasaray	1987–88	33	14
Galatasaray	1988–89	28	3
Galatasaray	1989–90	27	6
Galatasaray	1990–91	24	3
Galatasaray	1991–92	4	0
Galatasaray	Total	185	40
Altay	1991–92	8	1
Bakırköyspor	1992–93	6	1
Career total		380	65

== Honours ==
Partizan

- Yugoslav First League: 1975–76, 1977–78, 1982–83
- Mitropa Cup: 1977–78

Hajduk Split

- Yugoslav Cup: 1983–84

Galatasaray

- 1.Lig: 1986–87, 1987–88
