= Borislav Đurović =

Montenegrin footballer

Personal information
- Full name: Borislav Đurović
- Date of birth: 18 March 1952
- Place of birth: Nikšić, PR Montenegro, FPR Yugoslavia
- Date of death: 25 April 2003 (aged 51)
- Place of death: Belgrade, Serbia and Montenegro
- Position: Left back

Senior career*
Years	Team	Apps	(Gls)
1971–1973	Sutjeska		
1975–1980	Partizan	139	(3)
1980–1981	Real Valladolid	12	(0)

International career
1970–1972	Yugoslavia U20	30	(0)
- * Club domestic league appearances and goals

Borislav Đurović (Cyrillic: Борислав Ђуровић; 12 March 1952 – 25 April 2003) was a Montenegrin professional footballer.

== Club career ==
Nicknamed Gajica, Đurović started his career at hometown club Sutjeska, but was not allowed by them to move to a bigger club after Sutjeska's relegation in 1973. After two years without playing, he finally joined Partizan for whom he played 313 games in all competitions and scoring 14 games and won two league titles. He scored for Partizan in the 1978–79 European Cup against East German side Dynamo Dresden.

He later had two seasons abroad in Spain, with Real Valladolid.

== Death ==
He suddenly died in 2003, aged only 51. A fountain was erected by Partizan in his honour in Nikšić.

== Honours ==
Partizan

- Yugoslav First League: 1975–76, 1977–78.
