= Momčilo Vukotić =

Serbian footballer and manager (1950–2021)

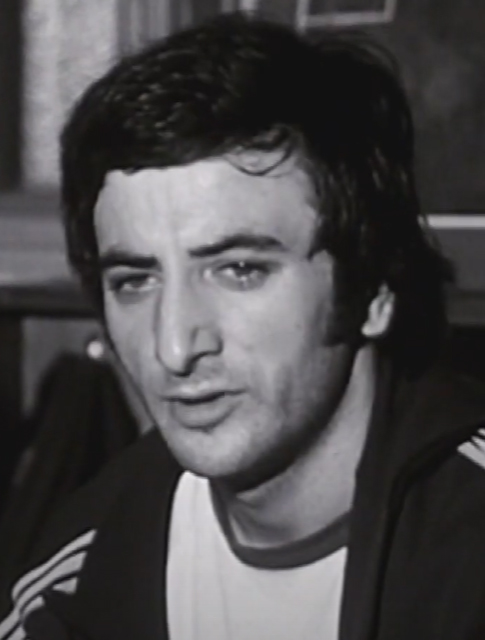
- Vukotić with Partizan in 1975

Personal information
- Full name: Momčilo Vukotić
- Date of birth: 2 June 1950
- Place of birth: Belgrade, PR Serbia, FPR Yugoslavia
- Date of death: 3 December 2021 (aged 71)
- Place of death: Belgrade, Serbia
- Height: 1.75 m (5 ft 9 in)
- Position: Attacking midfielder

Youth career
- 1962–1968: Partizan

Senior career*
Years	Team	Apps	(Gls)
1968–1978	Partizan	257	(79)
1978–1979	Bordeaux	36	(8)
1979–1984	Partizan	138	(33)
Total		431	(120)

International career
1972–1978	Yugoslavia	14	(4)

Managerial career
- 1988–1989: Partizan
- 1990–1992: Panionios
- 1993: Altay
- 1994–1996: Nea Salamis
- 1996–1998: Apollon Limassol
- 1998–1999: Ethnikos Achna
- 2001–2004: Cyprus
- 2006: Farul Constanța
- 2006–2007: PAOK
- 2008–2009: Levadiakos
- 2011: Panserraikos
- * Club domestic league appearances and goals

Momčilo "Moca" Vukotić (Serbian Cyrillic: Moмчилo Моца Bукoтић; 2 June 1950 – 3 December 2021) was a Serbian football coach and player.

He played 14 times for his national team, Yugoslavia, between 1969 and 1974 scoring four goals. In his club career in FK Partizan, he appeared in a total of 791 games in all competitions and all age levels, scoring 339 goals. He won the Yugoslav Championship three times.

== Playing career ==
Vukotić started playing for FK Partizan in 1962, at the age of 12.

He began his professional career as a player for FK Partizan in 1968, he won his first Yugoslav Championship in 1976 and the second in 1978. He also played for the Yugoslavia national team and participated in the European Championship in 1976, which was hosted in his country, where Yugoslavia finished fourth.

In 1978, Vukotić transferred to the French side FC Bordeaux, where he played for one season, scoring eight goals in 36 games. The following year, he returned to Partizan, and won the Yugoslav Championship a third and last time in 1982–83. He finished his career as player in 1984. He scored 33 goals in 138 games between 1980 and 1984. At the time of his death, Vukotić was Partizan's second most used player behind Saša Ilić (who made 861 appearances) and fourth on their all-time goalscores list behind Mustafa Hasanagić (355 goals), Marko Valok (411) and Stjepan Bobek (425).

== Coaching career ==
Vukotić became a coach in 1988. From 1988 to 1999 he coached FK Partizan, Panionios, Apollon Limassol, Nea Salamis Famagusta FC, Ethnikos Achna FC. As a coach of the Cypriot team Ethnikos, the team finished in the fourth position in the Cypriot Championship, the best position that the club achieved in its history. He became the assistant coach of FR Yugoslavia in Dejan Savićević's staff, but failed to qualify to the 2002 FIFA World Cup, because of one point less than the second Slovenia, Yugoslavia remained third.

After Yugoslavia, he continued working as a national team coach, this time for Cyprus and his team finished 4th in the 2004 UEFA European Football Championship qualifying, collecting eight points and some criticism began for Vukotić. The bad beginning for the 2006 FIFA World Cup qualification where at the first five matches, Cyprus won only one point – and that in a home tie match against Faroe Islands – was enough for him to resign as a coach.

He has been in charge at FC Farul Constanța since January 2006. Under his guidance Farul reached the semi-finals of the Romanian Cup, finished 7th in the Romanian First Division (then known as Divizia A, now known as Liga 1) and most important reached the 3rd Round of the UEFA Intertoto Cup losing to AJ Auxerre (4–1 away and winning at home 1–0). This was the second entry in the European Cups for Farul. Several players from Farul accused Vukotić of using an ineffective defensive style. Vukotić main objective for the 2006–07 season was to qualify for Europe next year, but he was released early on into the season after some poor results.

In October 2006, he became the head coach of PAOK, but got released in January 2007. In January 2011, he became the coach of Panserraikos.

He was the director of the FK Partizan Academy from 2012 to 2015 and the president from 2015 to 2017.

== Death ==
Vukotić died from lung cancer on 3 December 2021, in Belgrade.

== Career statistics ==
Scores and results list Yugoslavia's goal tally first, score column indicates score after each Vukotić goal.

List of international goals scored by Momčilo Vukotić
No.	Date	Venue	Opponent	Score	Result	Competition
1	20 September 1972	Turin, Italy	Italy	1–2	1–3	Friendly
2	30 October 1974	Belgrade, Yugoslavia	Norway	1–1	3–1	UEFA Euro 1976 qualifying
3	24 February 1976	Algiers, Algeria	Algeria	1–0	2–1	Friendly
4	24 April 1976	Zagreb, Yugoslavia	Wales	1–0	2–0	UEFA Euro 1976 qualifying

== Honours ==
Partizan

- Yugoslav First League: 1976, 1978, 1983
