= Refik Kozić =

Yugoslav footballer

Personal information
- Date of birth: 25 December 1951 (age 74)
- Place of birth: Bačko Novo Selo, FPR Yugoslavia
- Height: 1.80 m (5 ft 11 in)
- Position: Defender

Senior career*
Years	Team	Apps	(Gls)
1968–1972	Istra		
1972–1980	Partizan	165	(11)
1980–1983	Tampa Bay Rowdies	104	(7)
1980–1982	Tampa Bay Rowdies (indoor)	31	(8)
1983–1984	New York Cosmos (indoor)	31	(6)
1984	Tampa Bay Rowdies	21	(0)
- * Club domestic league appearances and goals

Refik Kozić (Serbian Cyrillic: Рефик Козић; born 25 December 1951) is a Yugoslav retired professional footballer who played for FK Partizan, and in the NASL between 1980 and 1984 for the Tampa Bay Rowdies. His son Alen Kozić is also a former professional player.

== Career ==
Born in Bačko Novo Selo, SR Serbia, Kozić began his professional career with NK Istra in 1968. He moved to FK Partizan in 1972 where he played in the Yugoslav First League for eight seasons. In 1980, he signed with the Tampa Bay Rowdies. In November 1983, the New York Cosmos signed Kozić after the Rowdies had waived him two months prior. Kozić played the 1983–84 NASL indoor season with the Cosmos. On 27 April 1984, the Cosmos traded Kozić back to the Rowdies in exchange for Pedro DeBrito.
