= Aleksandar Trifunović (footballer) =

Serbian football manager and player

Aco Trifunović
Personal information
- Full name: Aco Trifunović
- Date of birth: 13 May 1954 (age 72)
- Place of birth: Leposavić, PR Serbia, FPR Yugoslavia
- Height: 1.77 m (5 ft 10 in)
- Position: Midfielder

Youth career
- 1969–1971: Sloga Kraljevo

Senior career*
Years	Team	Apps	(Gls)
1971–1975	Sloga Kraljevo	75	(10)
1976–1983	Partizan	209	(20)
1983–1987	Ascoli	75	(5)
1987–1990	Obilić		
Total		359	(35)

International career
1977–1983	Yugoslavia	11	(2)

Managerial career
- 199x–199x: Železnik
- 199x–199x: Palilulac Beograd
- * Club domestic league appearances and goals

Aco Trifunović (Serbian Cyrillic: Ацо Трифуновић; born 13 May 1954) is a Serbian former football manager and player.

== Early life ==
Born in Planinica, a village near Leposavić, Trifunović relocated with his family to Kraljevo in 1959. He joined the youth system of Sloga Kraljevo at the age of 15.

== Club career ==
After starting out at Sloga Kraljevo and completing his compulsory military service, Trifunović joined Yugoslav First League side Partizan in the second part of the 1975–76 season, as the club won its first championship title in 11 years. He would spend a total of seven and a half years with the Crno-beli, amassing over 200 league appearances and scoring 20 goals. Between 1983 and 1987, Trifunović played for Ascoli in Italy. He retired after playing with Obilić in the lower leagues of Yugoslav football.

== International career ==
At international level, Trifunović represented Yugoslavia between 1977 and 1983, collecting 11 caps and netting two goals. He marked his national team debut by scoring a goal against Romania in a World Cup qualifier on 13 November 1977, helping Yugoslavia to a 6–4 victory. His last appearance for the Plavi came in a 4–2 friendly loss to West Germany on 7 June 1983.

== Managerial career ==
After hanging up his boots, Trifunović served as manager of several clubs in the lower leagues, including Železnik and Palilulac Beograd in the 1990s. He also worked in the youth setups of Partizan and BASK.

== Career statistics ==
=== Club ===
Appearances and goals by club, season and competition
Club	Season	League		
Club	Season	Division	Apps	Goals
Sloga Kraljevo	1971–72	Yugoslav Second League	23	1
Sloga Kraljevo	1972–73	Yugoslav Second League	34	6
Sloga Kraljevo	1973–74	Serbian League		
Sloga Kraljevo	1974–75	Yugoslav Second League	18	3
Sloga Kraljevo	1975–76	Serbian League		
Sloga Kraljevo	Total		75	10
Partizan	1975–76	Yugoslav First League	8	0
Partizan	1976–77	Yugoslav First League	29	1
Partizan	1977–78	Yugoslav First League	32	5
Partizan	1978–79	Yugoslav First League	32	2
Partizan	1979–80	Yugoslav First League	26	0
Partizan	1980–81	Yugoslav First League	31	3
Partizan	1981–82	Yugoslav First League	19	0
Partizan	1982–83	Yugoslav First League	32	9
Partizan	Total		209	20
Ascoli	1983–84	Serie A	19	0
Ascoli	1984–85	Serie A	0	0
Ascoli	1985–86	Serie B	36	5
Ascoli	1986–87	Serie A	20	0
Ascoli	Total		75	5
Career total			359	35

=== International ===
Appearances and goals by national team and year
National team	Year	Apps	Goals
Yugoslavia	1977	3	1
Yugoslavia	1978	3	0
Yugoslavia	1979	0	0
Yugoslavia	1980	0	0
Yugoslavia	1981	0	0
Yugoslavia	1982	2	0
Yugoslavia	1983	3	1
Total		11	2

== Honours ==
Partizan

- Yugoslav First League: 1975–76, 1977–78, 1982–83
- Mitropa Cup: 1977–78

Ascoli

- Serie B: 1985–86
