= 1985–86 NK Rijeka season =

Rijeka
1985–86 season
- Chairman: Stjepko Gugić, Dragan Krčelić
- Manager: Josip Skoblar
- First League: 5th
- Cup: Round 2
- Top goalscorer: League: Nebojša Malbaša (12); All: Nebojša Malbaša (14)
- Highest home attendance: 16,000 vs (Socialist Federal Republic of Yugoslavia) Hajduk Split (9 Mar 1986 - Yugoslav First League)
- Lowest home attendance: 2,000 vs (Socialist Federal Republic of Yugoslavia) Budućnost and (Socialist Federal Republic of Yugoslavia) Dinamo Vinkovci (6 October 1985 and 2 March 1986 - Yugoslav First League)
- Average home league attendance: 5,588

The 1985–86 season was the 40th season in Rijeka's history and their 24th season in the Yugoslav First League. Their 8th place finish in the 1984–85 season meant it was their 12th successive season playing in the Yugoslav First League.

== Competitions ==
Competition	First match	Last match	Starting round	Final position	Record							
Competition	First match	Last match	Starting round	Final position	G	W	D	L	GF	GA	GD	Win %
Yugoslav First League	11 August 1985	14 June 1986	Matchday 1	5th	34	12	13	9	42	31	+11	35.29
Yugoslav Cup	30 October 1985	20 November 1985	First round	Second round	2	1	0	1	4	2	+2	50.00
Total					36	13	13	10	46	33	+13	36.11

=== Yugoslav First League ===
Pos	Team	Pld	W	D	L	GF	GA	GD	Pts	Qualification or relegation
3	Velež	34	13	11	10	64	50	+14	37	Qualification for Cup Winners' Cup first round
4	Hajduk Split	34	15	7	12	55	44	+11	37	Qualification for UEFA Cup first round
5	Rijeka	34	12	13	9	42	31	+11	37	Qualification for UEFA Cup first round
6	Dinamo Zagreb	34	11	14	9	53	43	+10	36	
7	Željezničar	34	15	5	14	58	63	−5	35	

Source: rsssf.org
Rules for classification: 1) points; 2) goal difference; 3) number of goals scored.

==== Results summary ====
Overall								Home						Away					
Pld	W	D	L	GF	GA	GD	Pts	W	D	L	GF	GA	GD	W	D	L	GF	GA	GD
34	12	13	9	42	31	+11	49	11	5	1	28	7	+21	1	8	8	14	24	−10

==== Results by round ====
Round	1	2	3	4	5	6	7	8	9	10	11	12	13	14	15	16	17	18	19	20	21	22	23	24	25	26	27	28	29	30	31	32	33	34
Ground	A	A	H	A	H	A	H	A	H	A	H	A	H	A	H	A	H	H	H	A	H	A	H	A	H	A	H	A	H	A	H	A	H	A
Result	L	L	D	L	W	W	D	L	W	L	L	L	D	D	W	D	D	W	W	D	D	D	W	D	W	L	W	L	W	D	W	D	W	D
Position	11	16	16	16	16	12	12	12	9	11	12	14	11	15	14	13	14	13	9	10	10	10	9	9	6	7	6	7	5	6	5	5	4	5

Source: Competitive matches
A = Away; H = Home; W = Win; D = Draw; L = Loss

== Matches ==
=== First League ===
Round	Date	Venue	Opponent	Score	Attendance	Rijeka Scorers
1	11 Aug	A	Dinamo Vinkovci	1 – 2	3,000	Gračan
2	18 Aug	A	Hajduk Split	0 – 1	16,000	
3	21 Aug	H	Dinamo Zagreb	0 – 0	14,000	
4	25 Aug	A	Željezničar	1 – 3	5,000	Gračan (p)
5	1 Sep	H	Sloboda	3 – 0	4,000	Gračan (2, 1p), Škerjanc
6	4 Sep	A	OFK Beograd	3 – 1	4,000	Matrljan (2), Janković
7	8 Sep	H	Red Star	1 – 1	15,000	Valenčić
8	15 Sep	A	Vardar	0 – 4	7,000	
9	6 Oct	H	Budućnost	1 – 0	2,000	Valenčić
10	9 Oct	A	Sutjeska	0 – 1	3,000	
11	13 Oct	H	Priština	0 – 1	4,000	
12	20 Oct	A	Sarajevo	1 – 2	1,500	Janković (p)
13	27 Oct	H	Velež	3 – 3	3,000	Malbaša (3)
14	3 Nov	A	Osijek	0 – 0	2,000	
15	24 Nov	H	Partizan	1 – 0	8,000	Janković
16	1 Dec	A	Vojvodina	0 – 0	4,000	
17	8 Dec	H	Čelik	1 – 1	3,000	Janković (p)
18	2 Mar	H	Dinamo Vinkovci	2 – 0	2,000	Malbaša, Gračan
19	9 Mar	H	Hajduk Split	3 – 0	16,000	Janković, Malbaša (2)
20	16 Mar	A	Dinamo Zagreb	0 – 0	15,000	
21	23 Mar	H	Željezničar	0 – 0	5,000	
22	30 Mar	A	Sloboda	2 – 2	3,000	Gračan, Matrljan
23	6 Apr	H	OFK Beograd	2 – 0	3,000	Matrljan, Malbaša
24	12 Apr	A	Red Star	1 – 1	6,000	Kotur
25	20 Apr	H	Vardar	2 – 0	4,000	Matrljan, Malbaša
26	27 Apr	A	Budućnost	1 – 2	7,000	Malbaša
27	4 May	H	Sutjeska	3 – 1	3,000	Janković (p), Malbaša, Mladenović
28	7 May	A	Priština	1 – 2	15,000	Matrljan
29	18 May	H	Sarajevo	2 – 0	3,000	Kotur, Malbaša
30	25 May	A	Velež	1 – 1	6,000	Janković (p)
31	28 May	H	Osijek	1 – 0	3,000	Malbaša
32	1 Jun	A	Partizan	1 – 1	10,000	Mladenović
33	8 Jun	H	Vojvodina	3 – 0	3,000	Gračan, Matrljan, Janković
34	14 Jun	A	Čelik	1 – 1	1,000	Janković (p)

Source: rsssf.com

=== Yugoslav Cup ===
Round	Date	Venue	Opponent	Score	Rijeka Scorers
R1	30 Oct	H	Belasica	4 – 1	Janković (p), Matrljan, Malbaša (2)
R2	20 Nov	A	Budućnost	0 – 1	

Source: rsssf.com

=== Squad statistics ===
Competitive matches only.
Appearances in brackets indicate numbers of times the player came on as a substitute.

Name	Apps	Goals	Apps	Goals	Apps	Goals
Name	League		Cup		Total	
(Socialist Federal Republic of Yugoslavia) Mauro Ravnić	29 (0)	0	1 (0)	0	30 (0)	0
(Socialist Federal Republic of Yugoslavia) Nikica Milenković	33 (0)	0	2 (0)	0	35 (0)	0
(Socialist Federal Republic of Yugoslavia) Borče Sredojević	27 (0)	0	1 (0)	0	28 (0)	0
(Socialist Federal Republic of Yugoslavia) Boris Tičić	16 (10)	0	1 (0)	0	17 (10)	0
(Socialist Federal Republic of Yugoslavia) Igor Jelavić	23 (3)	0	1 (0)	0	24 (3)	0
(Socialist Federal Republic of Yugoslavia) Roberto Paliska	26 (2)	0	2 (0)	0	28 (2)	0
(Socialist Federal Republic of Yugoslavia) Vlado Kotur	26 (5)	2	2 (0)	0	28 (5)	2
(Socialist Federal Republic of Yugoslavia) Nenad Gračan	30 (0)	7	1 (1)	0	31 (1)	7
(Socialist Federal Republic of Yugoslavia) Davor Radmanović	3 (9)	0	0 (0)	0	3 (9)	0
(Socialist Federal Republic of Yugoslavia) Jovan Savić	5 (0)	0	1 (0)	0	6 (0)	0
(Socialist Federal Republic of Yugoslavia) Danko Matrljan	28 (4)	7	1 (0)	1	29 (4)	8
(Socialist Federal Republic of Yugoslavia) Nebojša Malbaša	31 (2)	12	2 (0)	2	33 (2)	14
(Socialist Federal Republic of Yugoslavia) Predrag Valenčić	20 (7)	2	2 (0)	0	22 (7)	2
(Socialist Federal Republic of Yugoslavia) Janko Janković	32 (0)	9	2 (0)	1	34 (0)	10
(Socialist Federal Republic of Yugoslavia) Rade Ljepojević	23 (4)	0	2 (0)	0	25 (4)	0
(Socialist Federal Republic of Yugoslavia) Mladen Mladenović	7 (4)	2	0 (0)	0	7 (4)	2
(Socialist Federal Republic of Yugoslavia) Zoran Škerjanc	10 (8)	1	1 (0)	0	11 (8)	1
(Socialist Federal Republic of Yugoslavia) Robert Rubčić	2 (2)	0	0 (2)	0	2 (4)	0
(Socialist Federal Republic of Yugoslavia) Željko Cupać	0 (1)	0	0 (1)	0	0 (2)	0
(Socialist Federal Republic of Yugoslavia) Nevenko Vasiljević	1 (1)	0	0 (0)	0	1 (1)	0
(Socialist Federal Republic of Yugoslavia) Danko Peranić	0 (1)	0	0 (0)	0	0 (1)	0
(Socialist Federal Republic of Yugoslavia) B Radojević	1 (0)	0	0 (0)	0	1 (0)	0
(Socialist Federal Republic of Yugoslavia) Zoran Šestan	2 (2)	0	0 (0)	0	2 (2)	0

== See also ==
- 1985–86 Yugoslav First League
- 1985–86 Yugoslav Cup
