= Dinamo–Rijeka derby =

Football rivalry in Croatia

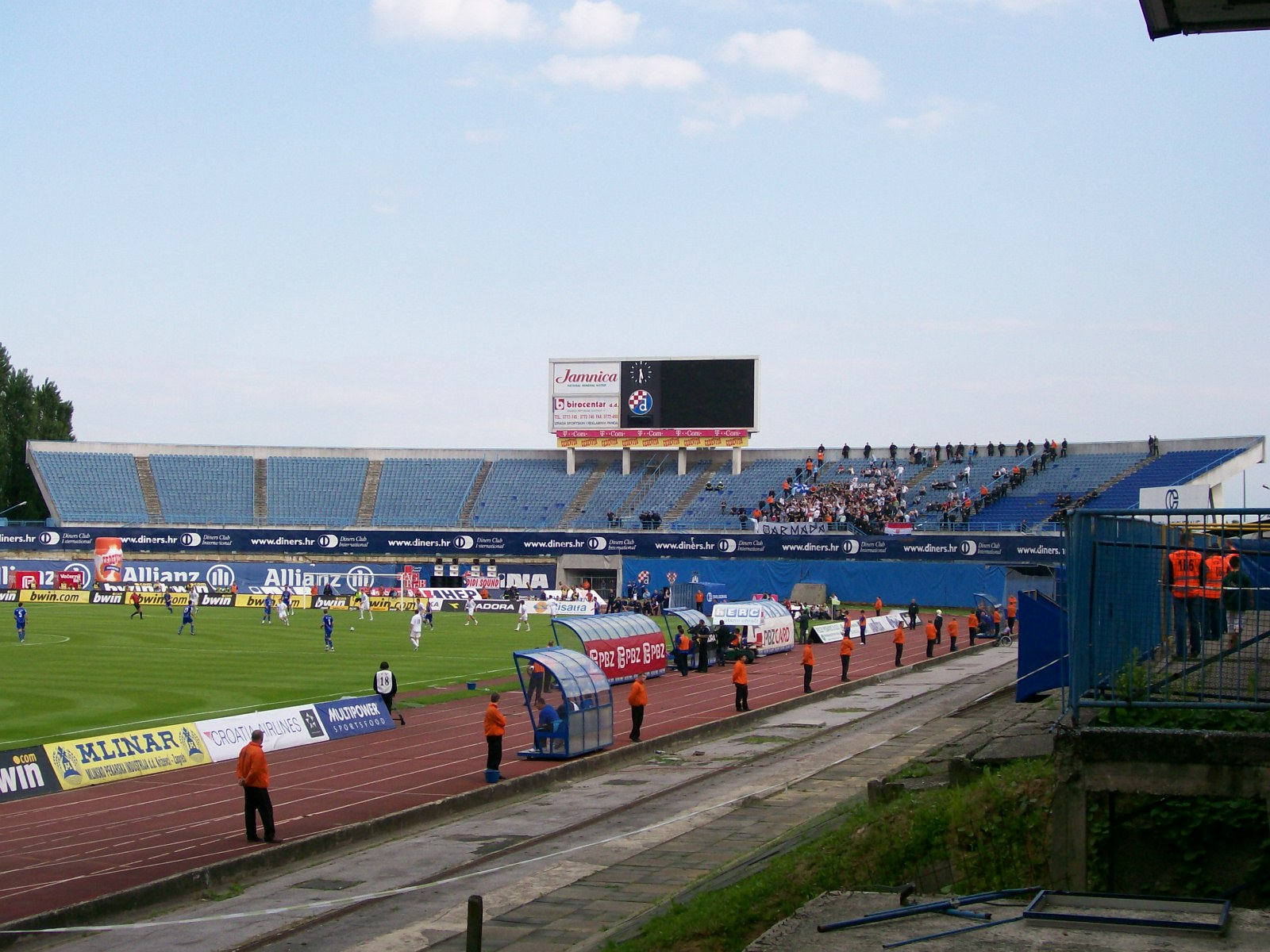
- The derby at Stadion Maksimir in 2008
- Location: Croatia
- Teams: Dinamo Zagreb and Rijeka
- First meeting: 22 December 1946
- Latest meeting: Dinamo Zagreb 2–0 Rijeka; 2026 Croatian Football Cup final (13 May 2026)
- Next meeting: TBC

Statistics
- Total meetings: 192 (165 league)
- Most wins: Dinamo Zagreb (101)
- Most player appearances: Daniel Šarić (32)
- Top scorer: El Arabi Hillel Soudani (14)
- Largest victory: Dinamo Zagreb 6–0 Rijeka; 1958–59 Yugoslav First League (21 Jun 1959); 2009–10 Prva HNL (19 Sep 2009)

Dinamo–Rijeka derby (Croatian: derbi Dinamo – Rijeka) is the name given to matches between Dinamo Zagreb and Rijeka. The teams are supported by their fanbases called Zagreb's Bad Blue Boys and Rijeka's Armada.

Games of note are the 1993–94 Croatian Football Cup, 2023–24 Croatian Football Cup and 2025–26 Croatian Football Cup finals when Dinamo won the trophy, and the 2013–14 Croatian Cup, 2016–17 Croatian Football Cup and 2018–19 Croatian Football Cup finals when Rijeka won. Dinamo has been the more successful side, evidenced by several long winning streaks throughout the Derby's history. However, Rijeka remained unbeaten in 23 consecutive home league fixtures from August 1964 until May 1994. While player movement between the two clubs has always occurred, it intensified since the mid-1980s, when Dinamo acquired many of Rijeka's best players. This trend has decreased over the past decade.

Due to various formats that were used in the Croatian championship and the cup competition format (which has teams playing two-legged fixtures even in the final game) and in addition to the matches played in the Supercup, there has been anywhere from two to six derbies per season. For example, as many as six derbies have been played between April and November 2004. Due to Rijeka's absence from the Yugoslav First League, no derbies were played between 1947 and 1958 and 1969 and 1974.

== Results ==
=== By competition ===
Competition	Played	Dinamo wins	Draws	Rijeka wins	Dinamo goals	Rijeka goals
Yugoslav championship (1946–1991)
League	58	26	16	16	96	61
Yugoslav Cup	2	2	0	0	8	2
Yugoslavia totals	60	28	16	16	104	63
Croatian championship (1992–present)
HNL	107	61	26	20	206	101
Croatian Cup	22	10	3	9	28	25
Supercup	3	2	0	1	6	3
Croatia totals	132	73	29	30	241	129
All Time	192	101	45	46	345	192

Last updated on 13 May 2026.

=== By ground ===
Ground	Played	Dinamo wins	Draws	Rijeka wins	Dinamo goals	Rijeka goals
Maksimir, Zagreb	95	70	16	10	224	66
Kantrida, Rijeka	67	19	21	27	69	83
Rujevica, Rijeka	24	9	8	7	43	35
Cellini, Rijeka	1	1	0	0	3	1
Drosina, Pula	1	0	0	1	1	3
Opus Arena, Osijek	1	1	0	0	2	0
Varteks, Varaždin	1	0	0	1	1	3
Koturaška, Zagreb	1	1	0	0	2	1

Last updated on 13 May 2026.

== List of matches ==
=== Key ===
Match ended in a draw
Dinamo win
Rijeka win

=== 1946–1991 ===
M	Date	Competition	Ground	Score	Dinamo scorers	Rijeka scorers
1	22 Dec 1946	Div 1	Cellini	1–3	Wölfl, Cimermančić, Senčar	Starcich
2	9 Mar 1947	Div 1	Koturaška	2–1	Lojen, Čajkovski	Laurencich
3	23 Nov 1958	Div 1	Kantrida	1–0		Medle
4	21 Jun 1959	Div 1	Maksimir	6–0	Matuš (3), Dugandžija, Čonč, Marković	
5	6 Dec 1959	Div 1	Kantrida	3–2	Matuš, Čonč	Lukarić, Berek, Medle
6	19 Jun 1960	Div 1	Maksimir	5–1	Blažić (4), Dugandžija	Berek
7	30 Oct 1960	Div 1	Maksimir	3–0	Jerković (2), Šikić	
8	19 Apr 1961	Div 1	Kantrida	0–0		
9	1 Oct 1961	Div 1	Kantrida	1–3	Zambata (2), Cvitković	Naumović
10	8 Apr 1962	Div 1	Maksimir	0–0		
11	23 Sep 1962	Div 1	Maksimir	5–0	Zambata (3), Jerković, Pašić	
12	7 Apr 1963	Div 1	Kantrida	0–2	Matuš, Lamza	
13	25 Aug 1963	Div 1	Kantrida	0–3	Zambata (2), Lamza	
14	8 Mar 1964	Div 1	Maksimir	1–0	Rauš	
15	22 Apr 1964	Cup (R16)	Maksimir	5–1	Lamza (3), Kobeščak, Lipošinović	Lukarić
16	16 Aug 1964	Div 1	Kantrida	0–1	Zambata	
17	7 Mar 1965	Div 1	Maksimir	2–3	Jerković, Belin	Gulin (3)
18	22 Aug 1965	Div 1	Kantrida	1–0		Lukarić
19	13 Mar 1966	Div 1	Maksimir	4–0	Lamza (2), Kiš, Zambata	
20	26 Nov 1966	Div 1	Maksimir	3–1	Zambata (2), Rora	Petrović
21	18 Jun 1967	Div 1	Kantrida	3–2	Devčić (o.g.), Zambata	B. Bursać (2), Tomljenović
22	19 Nov 1967	Div 1	Maksimir	2–1	Gucmirtl, Čerček	Perčić
23	16 Jun 1968	Div 1	Kantrida	1–1	Kiš	Žepina
24	1 Dec 1968	Div 1	Maksimir	3–0	Kiš (2), Rora	
25	29 Jun 1969	Div 1	Kantrida	3–1	Zambata	Blašković (o.g.), B. Bursać (2)
26	13 Oct 1974	Div 1	Kantrida	1–1	Čerček	Čohar
27	4 May 1975	Div 1	Maksimir	2–0	Senzen, Kranjčar	
28	9 Nov 1975	Div 1	Maksimir	3–0	Bonić, Senzen, Kranjčar	
29	26 Jun 1976	Div 1	Kantrida	0–0		
30	19 Sep 1976	Div 1	Maksimir	1–0	Zajec	
31	10 Apr 1977	Div 1	Kantrida	1–0		Kustudić
32	23 Oct 1977	Div 1	Maksimir	2–2	Zajec, Bonić	Desnica, Mijač
33	6 May 1978	Div 1	Kantrida	4–0		Durkalić (2), Kustudić (2)
34	12 Aug 1978	Div 1	Kantrida	2–1	Bobinac	Radin, Desnica
35	4 Mar 1979	Div 1	Maksimir	1–0	Bogdan	
36	17 Nov 1979	Div 1	Maksimir	5–1	Cerin (2), Kranjčar (3)	Radović
37	22 Jun 1980	Div 1	Kantrida	2–0		Radović, Ružić
38	26 Oct 1980	Div 1	Kantrida	3–0		Lukić, Hrstić, Radović
39	10 May 1981	Div 1	Maksimir	1–2	Mlinarić	Desnica, Radović
40	27 Sep 1981	Div 1	Kantrida	2–2	Panić, Deverić	Jerolimov, D. Bursać
41	31 Mar 1982	Div 1	Maksimir	2–0	Panić, Kranjčar	
42	5 Dec 1982	Div 1	Kantrida	1–1	Dumbović	Bračun (o.g.)
43	27 Apr 1983	Cup (SF)	Kantrida	1–3	Kranjčar, Krnčević, Mlinarić	Lukić
44	26 Jun 1983	Div 1	Maksimir	1–1	Bogdan	Desnica
45	11 Sep 1983	Div 1	Kantrida	2–0		Desnica, Radmanović
46	25 Mar 1984	Div 1	Maksimir	3–3	B. Bošnjak, Cerin (2)	Gračan, Fegic, Radmanović
47	11 Nov 1984	Div 1	Maksimir	4–1	Cvjetković, Cerin (3)	Desnica
48	19 May 1985	Div 1	Kantrida	3–1	Cvjetković	Valenčić (2), Desnica
49	21 Aug 1985	Div 1	Kantrida	0–0		
50	16 Mar 1986	Div 1	Maksimir	0–0		
51	12 Oct 1986	Div 1	Kantrida	3–0		J. Janković, Radmanović, Kotur
52	19 Apr 1987	Div 1	Maksimir	1–0	Cvjetković	
53	1 Nov 1987	Div 1	Kantrida	0–0		
54	15 May 1988	Div 1	Maksimir	3–2	Boban, H. Škoro (2)	Mladenović, J. Janković
55	14 Dec 1988	Div 1	Maksimir	2–0	Deverić, M. Agić	
56	31 May 1989	Div 1	Kantrida	1–0		Mladenović
57	15 Oct 1989	Div 1	Maksimir	1–1 (4–3 p)	Boban	Stipić
58	15 Apr 1990	Div 1	Kantrida	1–1 (4–1 p)	Šuker	Komljenović
59	12 Aug 1990	Div 1	Kantrida	0–0 (3–1 p)		
60	3 Mar 1991	Div 1	Maksimir	3–1	Adžić, Shala, Boban	Punišić

=== 1992–present ===
M	Date	Competition	Ground	Score	Dinamo scorers	Rijeka scorers	Attendance	Report
1	17 Mar 1992	1. HNL	Kantrida	1–0		Škerjanc	5,000	HRnogomet.com
2	28 Apr 1992	Cup (SF)	Kantrida	2–1	Adžić	Pavličić, Vulić	5,000	HRnogomet.com
3	12 May 1992	1. HNL	Maksimir	2–0	Slišković (2)		7,000	HRnogomet.com
4	19 May 1992	Cup (SF)	Maksimir	2–1 (3–1 p)	Adžić, Vlaović	Vulić	15,000	HRnogomet.com
5	29 Nov 1992	1. HNL	Maksimir	4–2	Adžić (2), I. Cvitanović, Stanić	Belajić, Šarić	10,000	HRnogomet.com
6	12 Jun 1993	1. HNL	Kantrida	2–1	I. Cvitanović	Ban (2)	5,500	HRnogomet.com
7	6 Nov 1993	1. HNL	Maksimir	2–0	S. Halilović, Jeličić		4,500	HRnogomet.com
8	11 May 1994	1. HNL	Kantrida	0–3	I. Cvitanović, Škrinjar, M. Novaković		6,000	HRnogomet.com
9	1 Jun 1994	Cup (Final)	Maksimir	2–0	Turković, I. Cvitanović		15,000	HRnogomet.com
10	15 Jun 1994	Cup (Final)	Kantrida	1–0		Pavličić	15,000	HRnogomet.com
11	14 Aug 1994	1. HNL	Kantrida	1–2	I. Cvitanović, Turković	D. Tadić	4,000	HRnogomet.com
12	26 Feb 1995	1. HNL	Maksimir	3–0	Kosić (2), Jeličić		7,000	HRnogomet.com
13	17 Sep 1995	1. HNL	Maksimir	2–0	Marić, M. Kovačić		4,000	HRnogomet.com
14	3 Dec 1995	1. HNL	Kantrida	1–1	Soldo	Perković	5,000	HRnogomet.com
15	29 Sep 1996	1. HNL	Kantrida	1–2	Marić, T. Rukavina	Brkić	6,000	HRnogomet.com
16	20 Apr 1997	1. HNL	Maksimir	3–0	I. Cvitanović (2), Jurčec		2,000	HRnogomet.com
17	21 Sep 1997	1. HNL	Kantrida	1–1	I. Cvitanović	Pilipović	7,500	HRnogomet.com
18	22 Feb 1998	1. HNL	Maksimir	2–0	Šokota (2)		4,000	HRnogomet.com
19	18 Oct 1998	1. HNL	Kantrida	1–0		Ivančić	10,000	HRnogomet.com
20	7 Mar 1999	1. HNL	Maksimir	3–0	Mujčin, Bišćan, Prosinečki		20,000	HRnogomet.com
21	21 Apr 1999	1. HNL	Maksimir	0–1		Balaban	3,000	HRnogomet.com
22	16 May 1999	1. HNL	Kantrida	0–2	Bišćan, Šokota		15,000	HRnogomet.com
23	7 Sep 1999	1. HNL	Maksimir	1–1	J. Šimić	Milinović	2,000	HRnogomet.com
24	27 Nov 1999	1. HNL	Kantrida	3–1	J. Šimić	Balaban (2), Sztipanovics	6,000	HRnogomet.com
25	14 Mar 2000	Cup (QF)	Kantrida	1–2	Pilipović, Šokota	Balaban	6,000	HRnogomet.com
26	21 Mar 2000	Cup (QF)	Maksimir	2–2	Šokota, Bazina	G. Brajković (2)	1,500	HRnogomet.com
27	6 May 2000	1. HNL	Maksimir	2–0	I. Cvitanović, Mujčin		1,000	HRnogomet.com
28	6 Aug 2000	1. HNL	Kantrida	0–1	Čutura		6,000	HRnogomet.com
29	30 Oct 2000	1. HNL	Maksimir	4–1	Sedloski, Balaban, Mujčin, Bišćan	Matulović	700	HRnogomet.com
30	21 Oct 2001	1. HNL	Kantrida	1–0		Sedloski (o.g.)	7,000	HRnogomet.com
31	21 Nov 2001	Cup (QF)	Maksimir	1–0	M. Jurić		2,500	HRnogomet.com
32	7 Dec 2001	Cup (QF)	Kantrida	0–1	Zahora		4,000	slobodnadalmacija.hr
33	13 Apr 2002	1. HNL	Maksimir	2–3	V. Petrović, Mešanović	Rački, Skočibušić, Vidović	2,500	HRnogomet.com
34	28 Sep 2002	1. HNL	Maksimir	2–1	Mitu, Balaban	M. Brajković	7,000	HRnogomet.com
35	8 Mar 2003	1. HNL	Kantrida	0–1	Mujčin		6,000	HRnogomet.com
36	9 Aug 2003	1. HNL	Kantrida	0–0			7,000	HRnogomet.com
37	8 Nov 2003	1. HNL	Maksimir	2–0	Zahora, Eduardo		2,000	HRnogomet.com
38	7 Apr 2004	Cup (SF)	Maksimir	4–2	Eduardo, Mitu, Sedloski, Strupar	Linić, Vidović	1,000	HRnogomet.com
39	14 Apr 2004	Cup (SF)	Kantrida	1–0		Bulat	6,000	HRnogomet.com
40	17 Apr 2004	1. HNL	Maksimir	5–0	Zahora (4), Sedloski		1,500	HRnogomet.com
41	12 May 2004	1. HNL	Kantrida	0–1	Bartolović		4,500	HRnogomet.com
42	21 Aug 2004	1. HNL	Maksimir	1–1	Zahora	Butić	5,000	HRnogomet.com
43	20 Nov 2004	1. HNL	Kantrida	4–2	I. Bošnjak, Karić	Linić, Dunković, Erceg (2)	5,000	HRnogomet.com
44	6 Aug 2005	1. HNL	Maksimir	5–1	I. Bošnjak, Mamić, Chago (2), Cesar	Krpan	10,000	HRnogomet.com
45	29 Oct 2005	1. HNL	Kantrida	0–1	Mitu		8,000	HRnogomet.com
46	25 Mar 2006	1. HNL	Maksimir	1–2	Etto	Drpić (o.g.), Vugrinec	20,000	HRnogomet.com
47	29 Apr 2006	1. HNL	Kantrida	2–2	Tomić, Modrić	Linić, Ah. Sharbini	6,000	HRnogomet.com
48	20 Jul 2006	Supercup	Maksimir	4–1	Etto, Modrić, Eduardo (2)	Bolić	15,000	HRnogomet.com
49	23 Sep 2006	1. HNL	Maksimir	1–0	Vugrinec		1,200	HRnogomet.com
50	17 Feb 2007	1. HNL	Kantrida	2–3	Modrić, Eduardo (2)	Ivanov, Štrok	8,000	HRnogomet.com
51	17 Mar 2007	1. HNL	Maksimir	1–0	Eduardo		5,000	HRnogomet.com
52	29 Sep 2007	1. HNL	Maksimir	1–0	Vukojević		8,000	HRnogomet.com
53	1 Mar 2008	1. HNL	Kantrida	2–4	Modrić, Vrdoljak, Mikić, Vukojević	A. Škoro, Šafarić	10,000	HRnogomet.com
54	10 May 2008	1. HNL	Maksimir	6–1	Mandžukić, Vukojević (2), J. Tadić (3)	Tadejević	20,000	HRnogomet.com
55	27 Jul 2008	1. HNL	Maksimir	2–0	Badelj, Balaban		6,000	HRnogomet.com
56	26 Oct 2008	1. HNL	Kantrida	1–0		An. Sharbini	3,500	HRnogomet.com
57	3 May 2009	1. HNL	Maksimir	4–0	Badelj (2), Sammir, Chago		10,000	HRnogomet.com
58	19 Sep 2009	1. HNL	Maksimir	6–0	Morales, Sivonjić (2), Barbarić (2), Kramarić		1,500	HRnogomet.com
59	3 Apr 2010	1. HNL	Kantrida	2–2	Sammir, Barbarić	Štrok, Al. Pamić	5,000	HRnogomet.com
60	31 Jul 2010	1. HNL	Maksimir	1–2	Sammir	Rodić, Badelj (o.g.)	3,500	HRnogomet.com
61	2 Apr 2011	1. HNL	Kantrida	0–2	Bećiraj, Badelj		4,500	HRnogomet.com
62	22 Oct 2011	1. HNL	Maksimir	2–0	A. Rukavina, Krstanović		2,000	HRnogomet.com
63	21 Apr 2012	1. HNL	Kantrida	1–1	Pivarić	Kreilach	5,000	HRnogomet.com
64	22 Sep 2012	1. HNL	Kantrida	3–0		Cesarec, Weitzer, Kreilach	9,000	HRnogomet.com
65	17 Feb 2013	1. HNL	Maksimir	4–1	Krstanović, Čop (3)	Benko	4,000	HRnogomet.com
66	5 May 2013	1. HNL	Kantrida	0–0			10,000	HRnogomet.com
67	28 Jul 2013	1. HNL	Kantrida	0–0			10,000	HRnogomet.com
68	6 Oct 2013	1. HNL	Maksimir	1–0	Soudani		3,500	HRnogomet.com
69	26 Feb 2014	1. HNL	Kantrida	2–2	A. Halilović (2)	An. Sharbini, Kramarić	7,000	HRnogomet.com
70	12 Apr 2014	1. HNL	Maksimir	4–0	Ademi, Pivarić, Čop, Šimunić		7,000	HRnogomet.com
71	7 May 2014	Cup (Final)	Maksimir	0–1		Tomečak	8,000	HRnogomet.com
72	13 May 2014	Cup (Final)	Kantrida	2–0		Mitrović, Kvržić	11,000	HRnogomet.com
73	11 Jul 2014	Supercup	Kantrida	2–1	Sigali	Samardžić, Moisés	8,000	HRnogomet.com
74	21 Sep 2014	1. HNL	Kantrida	1–2	Soudani (2)	Kramarić	9,000	HRnogomet.com
75	6 Dec 2014	1. HNL	Maksimir	3–0	Ademi, Henríquez, Čop		3,122	HRnogomet.com
76	4 Apr 2015	1. HNL	Kantrida	2–2	Pjaca, Sigali	Balaj, Radošević	6,600	HRnogomet.com
77	8 Apr 2015	Cup (SF)	Maksimir	2–1	Machado, Henríquez	Lešković	3,100	HRnogomet.com
78	22 Apr 2015	Cup (SF)	Kantrida	0–0			9,000	HRnogomet.com
79	29 May 2015	1. HNL	Maksimir	4–0	Pjaca (2), Taravel, Soudani		14,878	HRnogomet.com
80	8 Aug 2015	1. HNL	Maksimir	0–0			5,203	HRnogomet.com
81	25 Oct 2015	1. HNL	Rujevica	2–1	Fernandes	Samardžić, An. Sharbini	5,474	HRnogomet.com
82	21 Feb 2016	1. HNL	Maksimir	3–0	Soudani (2), Sigali		10,075	HRnogomet.com
83	19 Apr 2016	1. HNL	Rujevica	0–0			5,776	Prvahnl.hr
84	18 Sep 2016	1. HNL	Rujevica	5–2	Soudani, Pavičić	Gavranović, Gorgon (2), Vešović (2)	5,589	Prvahnl.hr
85	3 Dec 2016	1. HNL	Maksimir	1–1	Sigali	Gorgon	8,319	Prvahnl.hr
86	8 Apr 2017	1. HNL	Rujevica	1–1	Soudani	Andrijašević	6,004	Prvahnl.hr
87	27 May 2017	1. HNL	Maksimir	5–2	Soudani (3), Olmo, Hodžić	Vešović, Andrijašević	13,456	Prvahnl.hr
88	31 May 2017	Cup (Final)	Varteks	1–3	Olmo	Gavranović (2), Župarić	8,183	Hns-cff.hr
89	11 Aug 2017	1. HNL	Rujevica	0–2	Fernandes (2)		7,258	Prvahnl.hr
90	28 Oct 2017	1. HNL	Maksimir	3–1	Moro, Soudani (2)	Acosty	8,556	Prvahnl.hr
91	7 Mar 2018	1. HNL	Rujevica	4–1	Gavranović	Héber (2), Pavičić, Puljić	4,572	Prvahnl.hr
92	4 Apr 2018	Cup (SF)	Maksimir	3–0	Hajrović, Soudani, Ćorić		6,037	Hns-cff.hr
93	28 Apr 2018	1. HNL	Maksimir	0–1		Acosty	5,017	Prvahnl.hr
94	2 Sep 2018	1. HNL	Maksimir	1–1	Gavranović	Raspopović	5,752	Prvahnl.hr
95	24 Nov 2018	1. HNL	Rujevica	1–0		Čolak	4,635	Prvahnl.hr
96	10 Mar 2019	1. HNL	Maksimir	3–1	Gavranović, Perić, Moro	Puljić	6,186	Prvahnl.hr
97	11 May 2019	1. HNL	Rujevica	0–0			5,543	Prvahnl.hr
98	22 May 2019	Cup (Final)	Drosina	1–3	Oršić	Čolak, T. Halilović, Kvržić	6,742	Hns-cff.hr
99	13 Jul 2019	Supercup	Maksimir	1–0	Gojak		5,075	Hns-cff.hr
100	10 Nov 2019	1. HNL	Rujevica	0–5	Ivanušec, Oršić (3), Stojanović		5,517	Prvahnl.hr
101	18 Dec 2019	1. HNL	Maksimir	3–0	Olmo, Oršić, Petković		3,968	Prvahnl.hr
102	5 Feb 2020	Cup (QF)	Rujevica	1–0		Čolak	4,257	Hns-cff.hr
103	29 Feb 2020	1. HNL	Maksimir	4–0	Ademi, Kadzior, Oršić, Gojak		5,497	Prvahnl.hr
104	5 Jul 2020	1. HNL	Rujevica	2–0		Gvardiol (o.g.), Čolak	2,687	Prvahnl.hr
105	13 Dec 2020	1. HNL	Rujevica	2–2	Ivanušec, Lauritsen	Galović, Menalo	0	Prvahnl.hr
106	19 Jan 2021	1. HNL	Maksimir	0–2		Lončar, Andrijašević	0	Prvahnl.hr
107	7 Mar 2021	1. HNL	Maksimir	2–0	Ivanušec, Oršić		0	Prvahnl.hr
108	9 May 2021	1. HNL	Rujevica	1–5	Galović (o.g.), Mišić, Capan (o.g.), Oršić, Vukčević (o.g.)	Menalo	0	Prvahnl.hr
109	1 Aug 2021	1. HNL	Maksimir	3–3	Perić, Majer, Oršić	Issah (2), Drmić	1,503	Prvahnl.hr
110	16 Oct 2021	1. HNL	Rujevica	3–3	Petković (2), Andrić	Drmić (2), Velkovski	6,248	Prvahnl.hr
111	1 Dec 2021	Cup (QF)	Maksimir	1–3	Tolić	Obregón, Drmić, Murić	1,363	Hns-cff.hr
112	30 Jan 2022	1. HNL	Maksimir	2–0	Šutalo, Oršić		4,174	Prvahnl.hr
113	10 Apr 2022	1. HNL	Rujevica	1–2	Emreli, Ademi	Čerin	7,364	Prvahnl.hr
114	2 Sep 2022	HNL	Maksimir	3–1	Lauritsen, Špikić, Oršić	Vlasenko	5,894	Hnl.hr
115	13 Nov 2022	HNL	Rujevica	2–7	Mišić, Oršić (2), Špikić, Šutalo, Emreli (2)	Lunetta, Vrančić	5,586	Hnl.hr
116	19 Mar 2023	HNL	Maksimir	1–0	Ristovski		11,243	Hnl.hr
117	21 May 2023	HNL	Rujevica	1–2	Ivanušec, Moharrami	Marin	8,191	Hnl.hr
118	27 Aug 2023	HNL	Maksimir	2–1	Bulat, Petković	Pašalić	9,305	Hnl.hr
119	12 Nov 2023	HNL	Rujevica	2–2	Špikić, Perić	Selahi, Mitrović	8,108	Hnl.hr
120	25 Feb 2024	HNL	Maksimir	1–0	Brodić		17,269	Hnl.hr
121	5 May 2024	HNL	Rujevica	1–2	Petković, Hoxha	Pjaca	8,118	Hnl.hr
122	15 May 2024	Cup (Final)	Maksimir	0–0			18,709	Hns-cff.hr
123	22 May 2024	Cup (Final)	Rujevica	1–3	Sučić, Baturina, Bulat	Fruk	8,127	Hns-cff.hr
124	1 Sep 2024	HNL	Rujevica	1–1	Petković	Hodža	5,624	Hnl.hr
125	23 Nov 2024	HNL	Maksimir	0–0			12,066	Hnl.hr
126	22 Feb 2025	HNL	Rujevica	4–0		Djouahra, N. Janković, Petrovič, Čop	7,091	Hnl.hr
127	27 Apr 2025	HNL	Maksimir	1–0	Pjaca		15,711	Hnl.hr
128	16 Aug 2025	HNL	Rujevica	0–2	Beljo (2)		7,076	Hnl.hr
129	1 Nov 2025	HNL	Maksimir	2–1	Bakrar, Hoxha	Ndockyt	10,237	Hnl.hr
130	8 Feb 2026	HNL	Rujevica	0–0			7,102	Hnl.hr
131	18 Apr 2026	HNL	Maksimir	2–2	Beljo (2)	Dantas (2)	11,178	Hnl.hr
132	13 May 2026	Cup (Final)	Opus Arena	2–0	Stojković (2)		11,055	Hns-cff.hr

Note: Home team's score always shown first

== Top scorers ==
This is the list of top-scoring players in the derby. Data updated up to the last derby played on 13 May 2025.

14 goals

- (Algeria) El Arabi Hillel Soudani

13 goals

- (Croatia) Mislav Oršić
- (Croatia) Slaven Zambata

9 goals

- (Croatia) Igor Cvitanović

7 goals

- (Croatia) Boško Balaban
- (Croatia) Snješko Cerin
- (Croatia) Damir Desnica
- (Croatia) Eduardo da Silva
- (Croatia) Zlatko Kranjčar
- (Croatia) Stjepan Lamza
- (Croatia) Dario Zahora

6 goals

- (Croatia) Duje Čop
- (Switzerland) Mario Gavranović
- (Croatia) Bruno Petković

5 goals

- (Croatia) Željko Adžić
- (Croatia) Željko Matuš
- (Croatia) Marko Pjaca
- (Croatia) Tomo Šokota

== Players who have scored in Dinamo–Rijeka derby for both clubs ==
- Boško Balaban (7 goals, 3 for Dinamo and 4 for Rijeka)
- Duje Čop (6 goals, 5 for Dinamo and 1 for Rijeka)
- Mario Gavranović (6 goals, 3 for Dinamo and 3 for Rijeka)
- Marko Pjaca (5 goals, 4 for Dinamo and 1 for Rijeka)
- Andrej Kramarić (3 goals, 1 for Dinamo and 2 for Rijeka)
- Domagoj Pavičić (2 goals, 1 for Dinamo and 1 for Rijeka)
- Renato Pilipović (2 goals, 1 for Dinamo and 1 for Rijeka)
- Davor Vugrinec (2 goals, 1 for Dinamo and 1 for Rijeka)

== Players who have played for both clubs (senior career) ==
- Jasmin Agić
- Mehmed Alispahić
- Komnen Andrić
- Franko Andrijašević
- Boško Balaban
- Miroslav Blažević
- Jozo Bogdanović
- Ivan Boras
- Eddy Bosnar
- Ivan Bošnjak
- Josip Brezovec
- Marijan Brnčić
- Marijan Buljat
- Luka Capan
- Ivica Car
- Duje Čop
- Mladen Cukon
- Marijan Čabraja
- Emir Dilaver
- Mate Dragičević
- Josip Drmić
- Dino Drpić
- Niko Galešić
- Celestin Gašparini
- Mario Gavranović
- Bruno Goda
- Amer Gojak
- Alen Halilović
- Sejad Halilović
- Tibor Halilović
- Niko Janković
- Matej Jelić
- Dario Jertec
- Deni Jurić
- Fabijan Komljenović
- Andrej Kramarić
- Ivan Krstanović
- Sandro Kulenović
- Stjepan Lamza
- Marin Leovac
- Marko Lešković
- Rúben Lima
- Nebojša Malbaša
- Mate Maleš
- Petar Mamić
- Antonio Marin
- Luka Menalo
- Andre Mijatović
- Mihael Mikić
- Damir Milinović
- Josip Mišić
- Dumitru Mitu
- Mladen Mladenović
- Ivan Nevistić
- Mislav Oršić
- Stojan Osojnak
- Zvonko Pamić
- Branko Pavić
- Domagoj Pavičić
- Dubravko Pavličić
- Saša Peršon
- Renato Pilipović
- Marko Pjaca
- Nikola Pokrivač
- Josip Ražić
- Stefan Ristovski
- Gabriel Rukavina
- Elvis Scoria
- Ilija Sivonjić
- Dario Smoje
- Miro Stipić
- Fulvio Superina
- Ivica Šangulin
- Daniel Šarić
- Fuad Šašivarević
- Zoran Škerjanc
- Hrvoje Štrok
- Josip Tadić
- Mario Tokić
- Ivan Tomečak
- Davor Vugrinec
- Zoran Zekić

== Managers who have worked at both clubs ==
- Igor Bišćan
- Miroslav Blažević
- Nenad Gračan
- Branko Ivanković
- Sergej Jakirović
- Zlatko Kranjčar
- Josip Kuže
- Josip Skoblar

== Yugoslav First League results ==
The table lists the place each team took in each of the seasons they played together in the top division.

	46–47	58–59	59–60	60–61	61–62	62–63	63–64	64–65	65–66	66–67	67–68	68–69	74–75	75–76	76–77
No. of teams	14	12	12	12	12	14	14	15	16	16	16	18	18	18	18
Dinamo Zagreb	2	5	2	4	3	2	3	8	2	2	3	2	5	3	2
Rijeka	9	8	8	7	8	10	9	4	4	11	16	17	14	11	5

	77–78	78–79	79–80	80–81	81–82	82–83	83–84	84–85	85–86	86–87	87–88	88–89	89–90	90–91
No. of teams	18	18	18	18	18	18	18	18	18	18	18	18	18	19
Dinamo Zagreb	4	2	12	5	1	3	12	6	6	6	4	5	2	2
Rijeka	5	10	10	7	12	15	4	8	5	4	8	10	6	15

== Prva HNL results ==
The tables list the place each team took in each of the seasons.

	1992	92–93	93–94	94–95	95–96	96–97	97–98	98–99	99–00	00–01	01–02	02–03	03–04	04–05	05–06	06–07	07–08
No. of teams	12	16	18	16	12	16	12	12	12	12	16	12	12	12	12	12	12
Dinamo	5	1	3	2	1	1	1	1	1	2	3	1	2	7	1	1	1
Rijeka	6	4	6	11	9	4	7	2	4	10	5	9	3	4	2	7	4

	08–09	09–10	10–11	11–12	12–13	13–14	14–15	15–16	16–17	17–18	18–19	19–20	20–21	21–22	22–23	23–24	24–25	25–26
No. of teams	12	16	16	16	12	10	10	10	10	10	10	10	10	10	10	10	10	10
Dinamo	1	1	1	1	1	1	1	1	2	1	1	1	1	1	1	1	2	1
Rijeka	3	9	9	12	3	2	2	2	1	2	2	3	3	4	4	2	1	4

== See also ==
- Eternal derby
- Adriatic derby
- Osijek Rijeka derby
