= 1986–87 NK Rijeka season =

Rijeka
1986–87 season
- Chairman: Dragan Krčelić
- Manager: Josip Skoblar, Mladen Vranković
- First League: 4th
- Cup: Runners-up
- UEFA Cup: Round 1
- Top goalscorer: League: Janko Janković (19); All: Janko Janković (23)
- Highest home attendance: 20,000 vs Hajduk Split (10 August 1986 - Yugoslav First League)
- Lowest home attendance: 1,000 vs Vlaznimi Đakovica (13 August 1986 - Yugoslav Cup)
- Average home league attendance: 6,382

The 1986–87 season was the 41st season in Rijeka’s history and their 25th season in the Yugoslav First League. Their 5th place finish in the 1985–86 season meant it was their 13th successive season playing in the Yugoslav First League.

== Competitions ==
Competition	First match	Last match	Starting round	Final position	Record							
Competition	First match	Last match	Starting round	Final position	G	W	D	L	GF	GA	GD	Win %
Yugoslav First League	10 August 1986	14 June 1987	Matchday 1	4th	34	14	10	10	44	42	+2	41.18
Yugoslav Cup	30 October 1986	9 May 1987	First round	Runners-up	8	3	5	0	12	4	+8	37.50
UEFA Cup	17 September 1986	1 October 1986	First round	First round	2	0	1	1	1	2	−1	0.00
Total					44	17	16	11	57	48	+9	38.64

=== Yugoslav First League ===
Pos	Team	Pld	W	D	L	GF	GA	GD	Pts	Qualification or relegation
2	Velež	34	19	4	11	65	46	+19	42	Qualification for UEFA Cup first round
3	Red Star Belgrade	34	16	9	9	57	37	+20	41	Qualification for UEFA Cup first round
4	Rijeka	34	14	10	10	44	42	+2	38	
5	Vardar	34	15	8	11	40	39	+1	38	Qualification for European Cup first round
6	Dinamo Zagreb	34	14	9	11	49	43	+6	37	

Source: rsssf.org
Rules for classification: 1) points; 2) goal difference; 3) number of goals scored.

==== Results summary ====
Overall								Home						Away					
Pld	W	D	L	GF	GA	GD	Pts	W	D	L	GF	GA	GD	W	D	L	GF	GA	GD
34	14	10	10	44	42	+2	52	13	3	1	33	15	+18	1	7	9	11	27	−16

==== Results by round ====
Round	1	2	3	4	5	6	7	8	9	10	11	12	13	14	15	16	17	18	19	20	21	22	23	24	25	26	27	28	29	30	31	32	33	34
Ground	H	A	H	A	H	A	H	A	H	H	A	H	A	H	A	H	A	A	H	A	H	A	H	A	H	A	A	H	A	H	A	H	A	H
Result	D	L	W	D	L	L	W	D	W	W	D	W	L	W	D	W	L	L	W	D	W	D	D	D	D	W	L	W	L	W	L	W	L	W
Position	8	13	8	10	11	14	11	11	10	6	7	5	7	6	7	5	7	7	7	7	7	6	6	6	6	5	7	7	8	6	8	5	7	4

Source: Competitive matches
A = Away; H = Home; W = Win; D = Draw; L = Loss

== Matches ==
=== First League ===
Round	Date	Venue	Opponent	Score	Attendance	Rijeka scorers
1	10 Aug	H	Hajduk Split	2 – 2	20,000	Janković (2, 1p)
2	17 Aug	A	Velež	2 – 4	12,000	Janković, Paliska
3	24 Aug	H	Sarajevo	5 – 2	2,000	Matrljan, Janković (3, 1p), Radmanović
4	31 Aug	A	Dinamo Vinkovci	1 – 1	3,000	Paliska
5	7 Sep	H	Partizan	0 – 3	16,000	
6	14 Sep	A	Budućnost	0 – 2	6,000	
7	21 Sep	H	Sloboda	2 – 0	3,500	Janković, Paliska
8	28 Sep	A	Čelik	2 – 2	7,000	Vujčić, Matrljan
9	5 Oct	H	Spartak Subotica	2 – 1	2,000	Matrljan, Radmanović
10	12 Oct	H	Dinamo Zagreb	3 – 0	18,000	Janković (p), Radmanović, Kotur
11	19 Oct	A	Željezničar	1 – 1	5,000	Matrljan
12	2 Nov	H	Osijek	2 – 1	2,000	Janković, Matrljan
13	16 Nov	A	Priština	1 – 3	10,000	o.g.
14	23 Nov	H	Red Star	2 – 1	6,000	Kotur, Janković
15	30 Nov	A	Sutjeska	0 – 0	4,000	
16	7 Dec	H	Vardar	3 – 1	5,000	Janković (p), Matrljan, Vujčić
17	14 Dec	A	Radnički Niš	1 – 3	5,000	Janković (p)
18	22 Feb	A	Hajduk Split	0 – 2	15,000	
19	1 Mar	H	Velež	3 – 1	8,000	Valenčić, Vujčić, Janković
20	8 Mar	A	Sarajevo	0 – 0	1,500	
21	15 Mar	H	Dinamo Vinkovci	2 – 1	3,000	Janković (p), Radmanović
22	22 Mar	A	Partizan	1 – 1	20,000	Janković
23	29 Mar	H	Budućnost	2 – 2	3,000	Janković (p), Paliska
24	5 Apr	A	Sloboda	0 – 0	4,000	
25	12 Apr	H	Čelik	0 – 0	4,000	
26	15 Apr	A	Spartak Subotica	1 – 0	8,000	Vujčić
27	19 Apr	A	Dinamo Zagreb	0 – 1	8,000	
28	3 May	H	Željezničar	2 – 1	6,000	Radmanović, Škerjanc
29	13 May	A	Osijek	0 – 1	2,000	
30	17 May	H	Priština	1 – 0	4,000	Janković
31	24 May	A	Red Star	1 – 3	20,000	Janković (p)
32	31 May	H	Sutjeska	1 – 0	4,000	Mladenović
33	7 Jun	A	Vardar	0 – 2	10,000	
34	14 Jun	H	Radnički Niš	1 – 0	2,000	Janković

Source: rsssf.com

=== Yugoslav Cup ===
Round	Date	Venue	Opponent	Score	Attendance	Rijeka scorers
R1	13 Aug	H	Vlaznimi Đakovica	2 – 0	1,000	Matrljan, Janković (p)
R2	27 Aug	H	Crvena Zastava Kragujevac	5 – 0	1,500	o.g., Ljepojević, Vasiljević, Kotur, Vujčić
R2	9 Sep	A	Crvena Zastava Kragujevac	1 – 1	3,000	Janković
QF	8 Oct	A	Željezničar	0 – 0	600	
QF	19 Nov	H	Željezničar	0 – 0 (4–2 p)	6,000	
SF	11 Mar	H	Budućnost	2 – 1	8,000	Janković, Matrljan
SF	1 Apr	A	Budućnost	1 – 1	10,000	Janković
F	9 May	N	Hajduk Split	1 – 1 (8–9 p)	30,000	Radmanović

Source: rsssf.com

=== UEFA Cup ===
Round	Date	Venue	Opponent	Score	Attendance	Rijeka scorers
R1	17 Sep	H	(Belgium) Standard Liège	0 – 1	9,000	
R1	1 Oct	A	(Belgium) Standard Liège	1 – 1	20,000	Radmanović

Source: worldfootball.net

=== Squad statistics ===
Competitive matches only.

Name	Apps	Goals	Apps	Goals	Apps	Goals	Apps	Goals
Name	League		Cup		Europe		Total	
(Socialist Federal Republic of Yugoslavia) Mauro Ravnić	34+0	0	7+0	0	2+0	0	43	0
(Socialist Federal Republic of Yugoslavia) Nikica Milenković	18+3	0	4+1	0	1+0	0	27	0
(Socialist Federal Republic of Yugoslavia) Borče Sredojević	31+0	0	8+0	0	2+0	0	41	0
(Socialist Federal Republic of Yugoslavia) Igor Jelavić	28+0	0	8+0	0	2+0	0	38	0
(Socialist Federal Republic of Yugoslavia) Roberto Paliska	32+1	4	8+0	0	2+0	0	43	4
(Socialist Federal Republic of Yugoslavia) Vlado Kotur	32+0	2	7+0	1	2+0	0	41	3
(Socialist Federal Republic of Yugoslavia) Davor Radmanović	30+0	5	8+0	1	2+0	1	40	7
(Socialist Federal Republic of Yugoslavia) Danko Matrljan	26+2	6	7+0	2	2+0	0	37	8
(Socialist Federal Republic of Yugoslavia) Predrag Valenčić	19+8	1	1+4	0	1+0	0	33	1
(Socialist Federal Republic of Yugoslavia) Zoran Vujčić	30+1	4	7+0	1	2+0	0	40	5
(Socialist Federal Republic of Yugoslavia) Janko Janković	33+0	19	8+0	4	2+0	0	43	23
(Socialist Federal Republic of Yugoslavia) Rade Ljepojević	12+9	0	2+0	1	1+0	0	24	1
(Socialist Federal Republic of Yugoslavia) Mladen Mladenović	19+5	1	4+1	0	0+1	0	30	1
(Socialist Federal Republic of Yugoslavia) Zoran Škerjanc	9+11	1	3+3	0	0+2	0	28	1
(Socialist Federal Republic of Yugoslavia) Robert Rubčić	14+0	0	3+1	0	0+0	0	18	0
(Socialist Federal Republic of Yugoslavia) Nevenko Vasiljević	0+2	0	0+2	1	0+0	0	4	1
(Socialist Federal Republic of Yugoslavia) Mensur Strukar	1+5	0	2+1	0	1+0	0	10	0
(Socialist Federal Republic of Yugoslavia) Matjaž Florijančič	2+3	0	0+0	0	0+0	0	5	0
(Socialist Federal Republic of Yugoslavia) Zoran Šestan	0+4	0	0+2	0	0+0	0	6	0
(Socialist Federal Republic of Yugoslavia) Kazimir Vulić	1+2	0	0+0	0	0+0	0	3	0
(Socialist Federal Republic of Yugoslavia) Rajko Šarić	1+3	0	0+0	0	0+0	0	4	0
(Socialist Federal Republic of Yugoslavia) Valdi Šumberac	0+3	0	0+0	0	0+0	0	3	0
(Socialist Federal Republic of Yugoslavia) Robert Žagar	2+2	0	0+0	0	0+0	0	4	0
(Socialist Federal Republic of Yugoslavia) Jovan Savić	0+0	0	1+0	0	0+0	0	1	0

== See also ==
- 1986–87 Yugoslav First League
- 1986–87 Yugoslav Cup
- 1986–87 UEFA Cup

== External sources ==
- 1986–87 Yugoslav First League at rsssf.com
- Prvenstvo 1986.-87. at nk-rijeka.hr
