= 1984–85 NK Rijeka season =

Rijeka
1984–85 season
- Chairman: Davor Sušanj, Stjepko Gugić
- Manager: Josip Skoblar
- First League: 8th
- Cup: Round 2
- UEFA Cup: Round 2
- Top goalscorer: League: Adriano Fegic (11); All: Adriano Fegic (15)
- Highest home attendance: 22,000 vs (Spain) Real Madrid (24 October 1984 - UEFA Cup)
- Lowest home attendance: 1,500 vs (Socialist Federal Republic of Yugoslavia) Vojvodina (17 April 1985 - Yugoslav First League)
- Average home league attendance: 5,706

The 1984–85 season was the 39th season in Rijeka’s history and their 23rd season in the Yugoslav First League. Their 4th place finish in the 1983–84 season meant it was their 11th successive season playing in the Yugoslav First League.

== Competitions ==
Competition	First match	Last match	Starting round	Final position	Record							
Competition	First match	Last match	Starting round	Final position	G	W	D	L	GF	GA	GD	Win %
Yugoslav First League	19 August 1984	30 June 1985	Matchday 1	8th	34	12	10	12	49	48	+1	35.29
Yugoslav Cup	29 August 1984	10 October 1984	First round	Second round	2	1	1	0	2	0	+2	50.00
UEFA Cup	19 September 1984	7 November 1984	First round	Second round	4	2	0	2	7	6	+1	50.00
Total					40	15	11	14	58	54	+4	37.50

=== Yugoslav First League ===
==== Classification ====
Pos	Team	Pld	W	D	L	GF	GA	GD	Pts
6	Dinamo Zagreb	34	14	8	12	47	38	+9	36
7	Željezničar	34	11	12	11	53	46	+7	34
8	Rijeka	34	12	10	12	49	48	+1	34
9	Sutjeska Nikšić	34	11	11	12	41	42	−1	33
10	Priština	34	13	6	15	44	49	−5	32

Source: rsssf.org
Rules for classification: 1) points; 2) goal difference; 3) number of goals scored.

==== Results summary ====
Overall								Home						Away					
Pld	W	D	L	GF	GA	GD	Pts	W	D	L	GF	GA	GD	W	D	L	GF	GA	GD
34	12	10	12	49	48	+1	46	10	6	1	31	10	+21	2	4	11	18	38	−20

==== Results by round ====
Round	1	2	3	4	5	6	7	8	9	10	11	12	13	14	15	16	17	18	19	20	21	22	23	24	25	26	27	28	29	30	31	32	33	34
Ground	A	H	A	H	A	H	A	A	H	A	H	A	H	A	H	A	H	H	A	H	A	H	A	H	H	A	H	A	H	A	H	A	H	A
Result	L	W	L	W	L	W	W	D	D	L	D	L	D	D	W	L	W	W	L	W	D	D	L	D	W	L	W	W	W	L	D	L	L	D
Position	17	10	12	10	13	8	7	6	7	10	9	12	12	12	7	10	6	6	7	7	7	8	9	8	7	9	8	6	5	5	6	7	8	8

Source: Competitive matches
A = Away; H = Home; W = Win; D = Draw; L = Loss

== Matches ==
=== First League ===
Round	Date	Venue	Opponent	Score	Attendance	Rijeka Scorers
1	19 Aug	A	Radnički Niš	0 – 3	8,000	
2	26 Aug	H	Sarajevo	2 – 0	6,000	Matrljan, Radmanović
3	2 Sep	A	Velež	1 – 2	8,000	Radmanović
4	5 Sep	H	Iskra	3 – 1	4,000	Desnica, Matrljan, Fegic
5	9 Sep	A	Vardar	1 – 2	15,000	Fegic
6	16 Sep	H	Red Star	1 – 0	12,000	Fegic
7	23 Sep	A	Sutjeska	2 – 1	3,000	Matrljan, Gračan
8	7 Oct	A	Vojvodina	2 – 2	4,000	Gračan, Tičić
9	28 Oct	H	Dinamo Vinkovci	0 – 0	3,000	
10	31 Oct	A	Sloboda	1 – 2	2,500	Matrljan
11	4 Nov	H	Željezničar	1 – 1	5,000	Fegic
12	11 Nov	A	Dinamo Zagreb	1 – 4	8,000	Desnica
13	18 Nov	H	Hajduk Split	1 – 1	15,000	Fegic
14	21 Nov	A	Partizan	1 – 1	6,000	Radmanović
15	25 Nov	H	Budućnost	3 – 1	3,000	Malbaša (2), Fegic
16	2 Dec	A	Priština	0 – 3	12,000	
17	9 Dec	H	Osijek	5 – 0	3,000	Fegic (2), Gračan, Radmanović, Malbaša
18	17 Feb	H	Radnički Niš	3 – 0	2,500	Desnica (2), Radmanović
19	24 Feb	A	Sarajevo	0 – 1	2,000	
20	3 Mar	H	Velež	4 – 1	3,000	Gračan, Fegic, Malbaša (2)
21	10 Mar	A	Iskra	1 – 1	5,000	Stevanović
22	17 Mar	H	Vardar	2 – 2	4,000	Fegic (2)
23	7 Apr	A	Red Star	1 – 3	12,000	Gračan
24	14 Apr	H	Sutjeska	0 – 0	2,500	
25	17 Apr	H	Vojvodina	1 – 0	1,500	Desnica
26	21 Apr	A	Dinamo Vinkovci	0 – 3	5,000	
27	5 May	H	Sloboda	1 – 0	3,000	Valenčić
28	12 May	A	Željezničar	3 – 2	2,000	Škerjanc, Valenčić, Matrljan
29	19 May	H	Dinamo Zagreb	3 – 1	12,000	Valenčić (2), Desnica
30	9 Jun	A	Hajduk Split	2 – 5	8,000	Valenčić (2)
31	12 Jun	H	Partizan	0 – 0	12,000	
32	16 Jun	A	Budućnost	0 – 1	4,000	
33	23 Jun	H	Priština	1 – 2	4,000	Valenčić
34	30 Jun	A	Osijek	2 – 2	5,000	Gračan (2)

Source: rsssf.com

=== Yugoslav Cup ===
Round	Date	Venue	Opponent	Score	Rijeka Scorers
R1	29 Aug	A	Rad	2 – 0	Desnica, Radmanović
R2	10 Oct	A	Partizan	0 – 0 (3–4 p)	

Source: rsssf.com

=== UEFA Cup ===
Round	Date	Venue	Opponent	Score	Attendance	Rijeka Scorers
R1	19 Sep	A	Real Valladolid (Spain)	0 – 1	22,000	
R1	3 Oct	H	Real Valladolid (Spain)	4 – 1	12,000	Fegic (2), Hrstić, Desnica
R2	24 Oct	H	Real Madrid (Spain)	3 – 1	22,000	Fegic (2), Matrljan
R2	7 Nov	A	Real Madrid (Spain)	0 – 3	55,000	

Source: worldfootball.net

=== Squad statistics ===
Competitive matches only.
Appearances in brackets indicate numbers of times the player came on as a substitute.

Name	Apps	Goals	Apps	Goals	Apps	Goals	Apps	Goals
Name	League		Cup		Europe		Total	
(Socialist Federal Republic of Yugoslavia) Mauro Ravnić	19 (0)	0	1 (0)	0	4 (0)	0	24 (0)	0
(Socialist Federal Republic of Yugoslavia) Nikica Milenković	25 (5)	0	0 (0)	0	1 (2)	0	26 (7)	0
(Socialist Federal Republic of Yugoslavia) Borče Sredojević	28 (2)	0	2 (0)	0	4 (0)	0	34 (2)	0
(Socialist Federal Republic of Yugoslavia) Zvjezdan Radin	5 (0)	0	1 (0)	0	2 (0)	0	8 (0)	0
(Socialist Federal Republic of Yugoslavia) Boris Tičić	21 (1)	1	1 (0)	0	2 (0)	0	24 (1)	1
(Socialist Federal Republic of Yugoslavia) Mirza Kahrović	9 (2)	0	1 (0)	0	2 (0)	0	12 (0)	0
(Socialist Federal Republic of Yugoslavia) Miloš Hrstić	28 (0)	0	2 (0)	0	4 (0)	1	34 (0)	1
(Socialist Federal Republic of Yugoslavia) Srećko Juričić	15 (0)	0	2 (0)	0	4 (0)	0	21 (0)	0
(Socialist Federal Republic of Yugoslavia) Vlado Kotur	14 (2)	0	0 (0)	0	0 (0)	0	14 (2)	0
(Socialist Federal Republic of Yugoslavia) Damir Desnica	31 (0)	6	2 (0)	1	4 (0)	1	37 (0)	8
(Socialist Federal Republic of Yugoslavia) Nenad Gračan	28 (1)	7	1 (0)	0	4 (0)	0	33 (1)	7
(Socialist Federal Republic of Yugoslavia) Adriano Fegic	24 (0)	11	1 (1)	0	4 (0)	4	29 (1)	15
(Socialist Federal Republic of Yugoslavia) Danko Peranić	5 (0)	0	0 (1)	0	0 (0)	0	5 (1)	0
(Socialist Federal Republic of Yugoslavia) Zoran Šestan	4 (4)	0	0 (0)	0	0 (1)	0	4 (5)	0
(Socialist Federal Republic of Yugoslavia) Davor Radmanović	17 (5)	6	2 (0)	1	0 (4)	0	19 (9)	7
(Socialist Federal Republic of Yugoslavia) Jovan Savić	15 (1)	0	1 (0)	0	0 (0)	0	16 (1)	0
(Socialist Federal Republic of Yugoslavia) Roberto Paliska	9 (5)	0	0 (0)	0	0 (0)	0	9 (5)	0
(Socialist Federal Republic of Yugoslavia) Danko Matrljan	24 (4)	4	2 (0)	0	4 (0)	1	32 (4)	5
(Socialist Federal Republic of Yugoslavia) Nebojša Malbaša	20 (1)	5	2 (0)	0	3 (0)	0	25 (1)	5
(Socialist Federal Republic of Yugoslavia) Predrag Valenčić	9 (1)	7	0 (0)	0	0 (0)	0	9 (1)	7
(Socialist Federal Republic of Yugoslavia) Dragan Stevanović	6 (8)	1	1 (1)	0	2 (1)	0	9 (10)	0
(Socialist Federal Republic of Yugoslavia) Mladen Mladenović	4 (5)	0	0 (0)	0	0 (0)	0	4 (5)	0
(Socialist Federal Republic of Yugoslavia) Rade Ljepojević	5 (2)	0	0 (0)	0	0 (0)	0	5 (2)	0
(Socialist Federal Republic of Yugoslavia) Petar Zrilić	1 (3)	0	0 (0)	0	0 (0)	0	1 (3)	0
(Socialist Federal Republic of Yugoslavia) Zoran Škerjanc	8 (4)	1	0 (0)	0	0 (0)	0	8 (4)	1

== See also ==
- 1984–85 Yugoslav First League
- 1984–85 Yugoslav Cup
- 1984–85 UEFA Cup

== External sources ==
- 1984–85 Yugoslav First League at rsssf.com
- Prvenstvo 1984.-85. at nk-rijeka.hr
- 1984–85 UEFA Cup at rsssf.com
