= 1983–84 NK Rijeka season =

Rijeka
1983–84 season
- Chairman: Davor Sušanj
- Manager: Josip Skoblar
- First League: 4th
- Cup: Quarterfinal
- Top goalscorer: League: Damir Desnica (11); All: Damir Desnica (12)
- Highest home attendance: 20,000 vs (Socialist Federal Republic of Yugoslavia) Red Star (13 May 1984 - Yugoslav First League)
- Lowest home attendance: 4,000 (8 times - Yugoslav First League)
- Average home league attendance: 6,471

The 1983–84 season was the 38th season in Rijeka’s history and their 22nd season in the Yugoslav First League. Their 15th place finish in the 1982–83 season meant it was their tenth successive season playing in the Yugoslav First League.

== Competitions ==
Competition	First match	Last match	Starting round	Final position	Record							
Competition	First match	Last match	Starting round	Final position	G	W	D	L	GF	GA	GD	Win %
Yugoslav First League	14 August 1983	30 May 1984	Matchday 1	4th	34	16	10	8	53	37	+16	47.06
Yugoslav Cup	21 September 1983	18 April 1984	First round	Quarterfinal	3	1	1	1	3	5	−2	33.33
Total					37	17	11	9	56	42	+14	45.95

=== Yugoslav First League ===
==== Classification ====
Pos	Team	Pld	W	D	L	GF	GA	GD	Pts	Qualification or relegation
2	Partizan	34	15	12	7	43	25	+18	42	Qualification for UEFA Cup first round
3	Željezničar	34	15	12	7	52	35	+17	42	Qualification for UEFA Cup first round
4	Rijeka	34	16	10	8	53	37	+16	42	Qualification for UEFA Cup first round
5	Hajduk Split	34	12	15	7	39	22	+17	39	Qualification for Cup Winners' Cup first round
6	Osijek	34	12	10	12	36	39	−3	34	

Source: rsssf.org
Rules for classification: 1) points; 2) goal difference; 3) number of goals scored.

==== Results summary ====
Overall								Home						Away					
Pld	W	D	L	GF	GA	GD	Pts	W	D	L	GF	GA	GD	W	D	L	GF	GA	GD
34	16	10	8	53	37	+16	58	14	3	0	36	8	+28	2	7	8	17	29	−12

==== Results by round ====
Round	1	2	3	4	5	6	7	8	9	10	11	12	13	14	15	16	17	18	19	20	21	22	23	24	25	26	27	28	29	30	31	32	33	34
Ground	H	A	H	A	H	H	A	H	A	H	A	H	A	H	A	H	A	A	H	A	H	A	A	H	A	H	A	H	A	H	A	H	A	H
Result	W	L	W	L	W	W	W	W	D	W	L	W	L	D	L	D	D	L	W	L	W	L	D	W	D	W	W	W	D	D	D	W	D	W
Position	2	12	4	9	7	3	1	1	1	1	1	1	2	2	3	4	4	5	4	5	4	4	4	4	5	5	5	4	3	4	5	3	4	4

Source: Competitive matches
A = Away; H = Home; W = Win; D = Draw; L = Loss

== Matches ==
=== First League ===
Round	Date	Venue	Opponent	Score	Attendance	Rijeka Scorers
1	14 Aug	H	Željezničar	2 – 0	5,000	Gračan, Lukić
2	21 Aug	A	Budućnost	0 – 2	5,000	
3	28 Aug	H	Priština	2 – 1	7,000	Radmanović, Gračan
4	31 Aug	A	Partizan	1 – 2	15,000	Lukić
5	6 Sep	H	Dinamo Vinkovci	2 – 1	4,000	Radmanović, Lukić
6	11 Sep	H	Dinamo Zagreb	2 – 0	13,000	Desnica, Radmanović
7	18 Sep	A	Olimpija	2 – 1	10,000	Lukić, Radmanović
8	25 Sep	H	Vojvodina	2 – 1	4,500	Lukić, Matrljan
9	2 Oct	A	Sarajevo	0 – 0	5,000	
10	5 Oct	H	Čelik	4 – 1	4,000	Gračan (2), Desnica, Radmanović
11	16 Oct	A	Osijek	1 – 4	4,000	o.g.
12	23 Oct	H	Vardar	1 – 0	4,000	Desnica
13	30 Oct	A	Red Star	1 – 4	12,000	Matrljan
14	6 Nov	H	Velež	0 – 0	7,000	
15	20 Nov	A	Radnički Niš	1 – 3	3,000	Matrljan
16	27 Nov	H	Hajduk Split	1 – 1	6,000	Desnica
17	4 Dec	A	Sloboda	1 – 1	1,000	Fegic
18	26 Feb	A	Željezničar	1 – 2	6,000	Desnica
19	29 Feb	H	Budućnost	1 – 0	4,000	Radmanović
20	4 Mar	A	Priština	0 – 1	18,000	
21	11 Mar	H	Partizan	3 – 0	10,000	Lukić (2), Desnica
22	18 Mar	A	Dinamo Vinkovci	0 – 1	4,000	
23	25 Mar	A	Dinamo Zagreb	3 – 3	15,000	Gračan, Fegic, Radmanović
24	28 Mar	H	Olimpija	1 – 0	4,000	Gračan
25	7 Apr	A	Vojvodina	0 – 0	2,000	
26	15 Apr	H	Sarajevo	3 – 1	4,000	Fegic (2), Desnica
27	22 Apr	A	Čelik	3 – 2	6,000	o.g., Fegic, Tomić
28	29 Apr	H	Osijek	4 – 1	4,000	Tomić (2), Matrljan, Fegic
29	6 May	A	Vardar	2 – 2	12,000	Desnica, Gračan
30	13 May	H	Red Star	0 – 0	20,000	
31	16 May	A	Velež	1 – 1	5,000	Desnica
32	20 May	H	Radnički Niš	2 – 0	4,000	Lukić, Desnica
33	27 May	A	Hajduk Split	0 – 0	7,000	
34	30 May	H	Sloboda	6 – 1	5,000	Fegic (3), Gračan, Hrstić, Desnica

Source: rsssf.com

=== Yugoslav Cup ===
Round	Date	Venue	Opponent	Score	Rijeka Scorers
R1	21 Sep	A	Vitez	0 – 0 (6–5 p)	
R2	16 Nov	H	Drina	2 – 1	Gračan, Hrstić
QF	18 Apr	H	Red Star	1 – 4	Desnica

Source: rsssf.com

=== Squad statistics ===
Competitive matches only.
Appearances in brackets indicate numbers of times the player came on as a substitute.

Name	Apps	Goals	Apps	Goals	Apps	Goals
Name	League		Cup		Total	
(Socialist Federal Republic of Yugoslavia) Mauro Ravnić	19 (0)	0	1 (0)	0	20 (0)	0
(Socialist Federal Republic of Yugoslavia) Nikica Milenković	11 (9)	0	2 (0)	0	13 (9)	0
(Socialist Federal Republic of Yugoslavia) Vlado Kotur	33 (0)	0	3 (0)	0	36 (0)	0
(Socialist Federal Republic of Yugoslavia) Zvjezdan Radin	32 (0)	0	3 (0)	0	35 (0)	0
(Socialist Federal Republic of Yugoslavia) Nikola Marjanović	28 (3)	0	1 (1)	0	29 (4)	0
(Socialist Federal Republic of Yugoslavia) Miloš Hrstić	33 (0)	1	3 (0)	1	36 (0)	2
(Socialist Federal Republic of Yugoslavia) Srećko Juričić	26 (0)	0	3 (0)	0	29 (0)	0
(Socialist Federal Republic of Yugoslavia) Damir Desnica	32 (0)	11	3 (0)	1	35 (0)	12
(Socialist Federal Republic of Yugoslavia) Nenad Gračan	31 (0)	8	3 (0)	1	34 (0)	9
(Socialist Federal Republic of Yugoslavia) Adriano Fegic	15 (3)	9	1 (0)	0	16 (3)	9
(Socialist Federal Republic of Yugoslavia) Milan Ružić	0 (1)	0	0 (0)	0	0 (1)	0
(Socialist Federal Republic of Yugoslavia) Edmond Tomić	0 (8)	3	0 (0)	0	0 (8)	3
(Socialist Federal Republic of Yugoslavia) Davor Radmanović	24 (6)	7	3 (0)	0	27 (6)	7
(Socialist Federal Republic of Yugoslavia) Duško Lukić	27 (0)	8	3 (0)	0	30 (0)	8
(Socialist Federal Republic of Yugoslavia) Danko Matrljan	18 (5)	4	2 (0)	0	20 (5)	4
(Socialist Federal Republic of Yugoslavia) Nebojša Malbaša	13 (5)	0	0 (2)	0	13 (7)	0
(Socialist Federal Republic of Yugoslavia) Mišo Krstičević	6 (6)	0	0 (1)	0	6 (7)	0
(Socialist Federal Republic of Yugoslavia) Dragan Stevanović	4 (6)	0	0 (0)	0	4 (6)	0
(Socialist Federal Republic of Yugoslavia) Neshat Zhavelli	16 (0)	0	2 (0)	0	18 (0)	0
(Socialist Federal Republic of Yugoslavia) Boris Tičić	6 (3)	0	0 (1)	0	6 (4)	0
(Socialist Federal Republic of Yugoslavia) Robert Rubčić	0 (2)	0	0 (0)	0	0 (2)	0
(Socialist Federal Republic of Yugoslavia) Rade Ljepojević	0 (1)	0	0 (0)	0	0 (1)	0
(Socialist Federal Republic of Yugoslavia) Zoran Škerjanc	1 (3)	0	0 (0)	0	1 (3)	0

== See also ==
- 1983–84 Yugoslav First League
- 1983–84 Yugoslav Cup

== External sources ==
- 1983–84 Yugoslav First League at rsssf.com
- Prvenstvo 1983.-84. at nk-rijeka.hr
