= 1986–87 Yugoslav Cup =

Football competition in SFR Yugoslavia

Marshal Tito Cup

Tournament details
- Country: Yugoslavia

Final positions
- Champions: Hajduk Split (8th title)
- Runners-up: Rijeka

The 1986–87 Yugoslav Cup was the 39th season of the top football knockout competition in SFR Yugoslavia, the Yugoslav Cup (Serbo-Croatian: Kup Jugoslavije), also known as the "Marshal Tito Cup" (Kup Maršala Tita), since its establishment in 1946. Hajduk Split beat Rijeka in the final on penalties after the teams drew 1-1 in extra time.

== First round ==
In the following tables winning teams are marked in bold; teams from outside top level are marked in italic script.

Tie no	Home team	Score	Away team
1	Belišće	1–2	**Sutjeska Nikšić**
2	**Budućnost Banovići**	0–0 (3–2 p)	Dinamo Zagreb
3	**Crvena Zastava Kragujevac**	1–1 (4–2 p)	Sarajevo
4	**Karlovac**	1–0	Prishtina
5	**Maribor**	3–0	Vardar
6	Neretva	0–1	**Budućnost Titograd**
7	OFK Kikinda	0–1	**Velež**
8	OFK Prijedor	2–3	**Sloboda Tuzla**
9	**Osijek**	7–0	Pobeda Prilep
10	**Radnički Kragujevac**	3–2	Partizan
11	**Red Star**	1–1 (11–10 p)	OFK Belgrade
12	**Rijeka**	2–0	Vlaznimi Đakovica
13	**Spartak Subotica**	1–1 (3–1 p)	Dinamo Vinkovci
14	Tekstilac Bijelo Polje	0–7	**Hajduk Split**
15	**Vojvodina**	3–0	Čelik Zenica
16	**Željezničar Sarajevo**	2–2 (5–3 p)	Radnički Niš

== Second round ==
Tie no	Team 1	Agg.	Team 2	1st leg	2nd leg
1	**Budućnost Titograd**	4–3	Velež	2–3	2–0
2	**Hajduk Split**	5–3	Budućnost Banovići	4–1	1–2
3	Maribor	1–5	**Željezničar Sarajevo**	0–0	1–5
4	**Radnički Kragujevac**	4–1	Karlovac	3–0	1–1
5	**Red Star**	2–0	Sloboda Tuzla	1–0	1–0
6	**Rijeka**	6–1	Crvena Zastava	5–0	1–1
7	**Spartak Subotica**	3–2	Sutjeska Nikšić	2–0	1–2
8	Vojvodina	2–4	**Osijek**	1–2	1–2

== Quarter-finals ==
Tie no	Team 1	Agg.	Team 2	1st leg	2nd leg
1	**Budućnost Titograd**	4–1	Radnički Kragujevac	4–0	0–1
2	**Hajduk Split**	5–3	Spartak Subotica	3–2	2–1
3	**Red Star**	4–0	Osijek	1–0	3–0
4	Željezničar Sarajevo	0–0 (2–4 p)	**Rijeka**	0–0	0–0

== Semi-finals ==
Tie no	Team 1	Agg.	Team 2	1st leg	2nd leg
1	**Hajduk Split**	2–2 (5–4 p)	Red Star	1–2	1–0
2	**Rijeka**	3–2	Budućnost Titograd	2–1	1–1

== Final ==
9 May 1987

Hajduk Split	1–1 (a.e.t.)	Rijeka
Asanović 43' (pen.)		Radmanović 85'
Penalties
Asanović (penalty scored); Čelić (penalty scored); Andrijašević (penalty scored); Tipurić (penalty scored); Setinov (penalty missed); Dražić (penalty scored); Bursać (penalty missed); Deverić (penalty scored); Jarni (penalty scored); Adamović (penalty scored); Varvodić (penalty scored)	9–8	(penalty scored) Mladenović; (penalty missed) Radmanović; (penalty scored) Valenčić; (penalty scored) Janković; (penalty scored) Škerjanc; (penalty scored) Sredojević; (penalty missed) Ravnić; (penalty scored) Jelavić; (penalty scored) Kotur; (penalty scored) Rubčić; (penalty missed) Paliska

JNA Stadium, Belgrade
Attendance: 30,000
Referee: Zoran Petrović (Belgrade)

**Hajduk Split**	**Rijeka**

GK	1	(Socialist Federal Republic of Yugoslavia) Mladen Pralija	(substituted off) 119'
DF	2	(Socialist Federal Republic of Yugoslavia) Robert Jarni
DF	3	(Socialist Federal Republic of Yugoslavia) Darko Dražić
MF	4	(Socialist Federal Republic of Yugoslavia) Stjepan Andrijašević
DF	5	(Socialist Federal Republic of Yugoslavia) Dragi Setinov
DF	6	(Socialist Federal Republic of Yugoslavia) Jerko Tipurić
FW	7	(Socialist Federal Republic of Yugoslavia) Stjepan Deverić
MF	8	(Socialist Federal Republic of Yugoslavia) Dragutin Čelić (c)
FW	9	(Socialist Federal Republic of Yugoslavia) Miloš Bursać
MF	10	(Socialist Federal Republic of Yugoslavia) Aljoša Asanović
MF	11	(Socialist Federal Republic of Yugoslavia) Frane Bućan	(substituted off) 103'
Substitutes:
GK	12	(Socialist Federal Republic of Yugoslavia) Zoran Varvodić	(substituted on) 119'
FW	16	(Socialist Federal Republic of Yugoslavia) Zdenko Adamović	(substituted on) 103'
MF		(Socialist Federal Republic of Yugoslavia) Ive Jerolimov
Manager:
(Socialist Federal Republic of Yugoslavia) Josip Skoblar

GK	1	(Socialist Federal Republic of Yugoslavia) Mauro Ravnić (c)
DF	2	(Socialist Federal Republic of Yugoslavia) Igor Jelavić
DF	3	(Socialist Federal Republic of Yugoslavia) Robert Rubčić
MF	4	(Socialist Federal Republic of Yugoslavia) Vlado Kotur
DF	5	(Socialist Federal Republic of Yugoslavia) Roberto Paliska
DF	6	(Socialist Federal Republic of Yugoslavia) Borče Sredojević
FW	7	(Socialist Federal Republic of Yugoslavia) Janko Janković
MF	10	(Socialist Federal Republic of Yugoslavia) Mladen Mladenović
MF		(Socialist Federal Republic of Yugoslavia) Davor Radmanović
FW		(Socialist Federal Republic of Yugoslavia) Danko Matrljan	(substituted off) 46'
FW		(Socialist Federal Republic of Yugoslavia) Zoran Vujčić	(substituted off) 76'
Substitutes:
MF	13	(Socialist Federal Republic of Yugoslavia) Zoran Škerjanc	(substituted on) 46'
MF	14	(Socialist Federal Republic of Yugoslavia) Predrag Valenčić	(substituted on) 76'
Manager:
(Socialist Federal Republic of Yugoslavia) Mladen Vranković

**Match rules**

- 90 minutes.
- 30 minutes of extra-time if necessary.
- Penalty shoot-out if scores still level.
- Five named substitutes
- Maximum of 2 substitutions.

== See also ==
- 1986–87 Yugoslav First League
- 1986–87 Yugoslav Second League
