= Varvodić =

Varvodić is a Croatian surname. Notable people with the surname include:

- Miro Varvodić (born 1989), Croatian footballer
- Zoran Varvodić (born 1969), Croatian footballer
