= Valencic =

Valencic, Valenčič or Valenčić is a surname. Notable people with the surname include:

- Filip Valenčič (born 1992), Slovenian footballer
- Jože Valenčič (born 1948), Yugoslav cyclist
- Mitja Valenčič (born 1978), Slovenian alpine skier
- Predrag Valenčić (born 1963), Croatian footballer
