= Danko Matrljan =

Croatian footballer

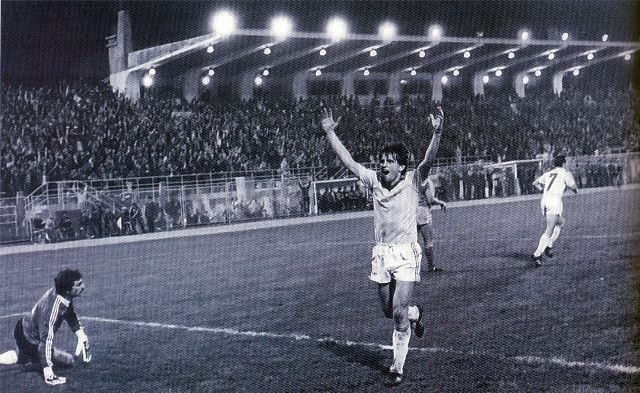
- Matrljan celebrates scoring against Real Madrid CF in the UEFA Cup in October 1984

Personal information
- Date of birth: 4 March 1960 (age 66)
- Place of birth: Rijeka, FPR Yugoslavia
- Position: Striker

Team information
- Current team: Rijeka (Youth academy)

Youth career
- Rijeka

Senior career*
Years	Team	Apps	(Gls)
1978–1982	Orijent		
1982–1987	Rijeka	132	(25)
1987–1988	Logroñés	1	(0)
1988–1992	Orléans	33	(5)
1992–1993	Orijent Rijeka		
1993–1995	Buje		
1995–1998	Pomorac		

Managerial career
- Orijent
- 2000–2001: Rijeka (assistant)
- 2001–2002: Pomorac (assistant)
- 2002: Pomorac
- 2003–2004: Rijeka (assistant)
- 2004–2006: Rijeka (youth)
- 2006–2007: Rijeka (assistant)
- 2008–2009: Rijeka (youth)
- 2009–2010: Krk
- 2010–2011: Al-Muharraq (assistant)
- 2011: Kazma (assistant)
- 2011–2012: Rijeka (assistant)
- 2015–2018: Rijeka (assistant)
- * Club domestic league appearances and goals

Danko Matrljan (born 4 March 1960) is a Croatian former professional football striker who played for HNK Rijeka, NK Pomorac 1921, HNK Orijent, French club US Orléans and Spanish side CD Logroñés. One of the defining moments of his career came on 24 October 1984, when Rijeka defeated Real Madrid CF 3–1 in the UEFA Cup at Stadion Kantrida what remains one of the greatest victories in Rijeka’s history. After retiring as a player, Matrljan moved into coaching. He worked in several roles at HNK Rijeka, including as an assistant coach under Matjaž Kek that led HNK Rijeka to its first Croatian Football League title and the domestic double in 2016–17.

== Playing Career ==
Croatia

- He made over 150 competitive appearances for HNK Rijeka.
- He scored 30 official goals for the club across all competitions (League: 132 appearances - 25 goals, Yugoslav Cup: 15 appearances - 4 goals, UEFA Cup: 6 appearances - 1 goal).
- Although official records credit him with fewer competitive goals, Matrljan has stated in interviews that he scored more than 120 goals for Rijeka in first-team matches, including friendlies and other unofficial fixtures. He has said that, of all those goals, his strike against Real Madrid remains the most memorable.
- His 1985–86 and 1986–87 seasons were his most productive, with 8 goals in each across all competitions.
- His goal against Real Madrid CF in the 1984–85 UEFA Cup remains one of the most iconic goals in Rijeka’s European history.

Spain

- CD Logroñés (1987–1988)
- Although his time there was short, reaching La Liga was a significant achievement for a player coming from the Yugoslav league in the 1980s.

France

- US Orléans (1988–1992)
- 33 league appearances.
- 5 league goals.
- Several cup appearances, taking his total to 36 official matches and 6 goals for the club.
- Official statistics for parts of his playing career have not been fully preserved, so appearance and goal totals may be incomplete.

== Coaching Career ==
He remained deeply involved in football, serving as:

- Assistant coach of HNK Rijeka (multiple spells). As a member of Matjaž Kek’s coaching team, he led Rijeka to their first-ever Croatian Football League title and the historic double in 2016–17. The success is regarded as one of the greatest achievements in the club’s history.
- Youth coach at HNK Rijeka coaching juniors and cadets to foster emerging talent within the club's system. His work emphasized technical development and individual skill enhancement, aligning with Rijeka's tradition of producing homegrown players.
- Head coach of NK Pomorac 1921.
- Assistant coach abroad in Bahrain's Muharraq Club.
- Assistant coach abroad in Kuwait's Kazma.
- More recently, a youth coach within HNK Rijeka’s academy.

== Playing Statistics ==
Appearances and goals by club, season and competition
Season	Club	League			Cup		Continental		Total	
Season	Club	Division	Apps	Goals	Apps	Goals	Apps	Goals	Apps	Goals
Rijeka	1982–83	Yugoslav First League	20	4	3	1	–		23	5
Rijeka	1983–84	Yugoslav First League	23	4	2	0	–		25	4
Rijeka	1984–85	Yugoslav First League	28	4	2	0	4	1	34	5
Rijeka	1985–86	Yugoslav First League	32	7	1	1	–		33	8
Rijeka	1986–87	Yugoslav First League	28	6	7	2	2	0	37	8
Rijeka	1987–88	Yugoslav First League	1	0	–		–		1	0
Rijeka	Total		132	25	15	4	6	1	153	30
Logroñes	1987–88	La Liga	1	0	0	0	–		1	0
Orléans	1988–89	French Division 2	23	5	3	1	–		26	6
Orléans	1989–90	French Division 2	10	0	0	0	–		26	6
Orléans	1990–91	French Division 2	0	0	0	0	–		0	0
Orléans	1991–92	French Division 2	0	0	0	0	–		0	0
Orléans	Total		33	5	3	1	0	0	36	6
Career total			176	30	18	4	6	1	200	35

== Honours ==
Player

HNK Rijeka

- Yugoslav Cup runner-up: 1987

Assistant Coach

HNK Rijeka

- Croatian First Football League: 2016–17
- Croatian Football Cup: 2016–17

Youth (Junior) Coach

HNK Rijeka

- Kvarnerska Rivijera: 2009, 2010
- Croatian Junior Football Cup: 2006-07

== Legacy ==
Matrljan is one of the few figures in HNK Rijeka’s history to have contributed to two of the club’s greatest achievements: as a player, by scoring in the historic 3–1 victory over Real Madrid in 1984, and as assistant coach under Matjaž Kek when Rijeka won its first Croatian Football League title and domestic double in 2017. In October 2024, during the 40th anniversary of Rijeka’s victory over Real Madrid, more than a thousand supporters gathered at Stadion Kantrida to commemorate the occasion. As part of the celebrations, a mural depicting Matrljan’s iconic goal celebration was unveiled, recognising his contribution to one of the most significant matches in the club’s history.

== Early life ==
Born in Rijeka and raised in the Trsat neighbourhood, where he attended Prva sušačka hrvatska gimnazija (Sušačka Gymnasium). His father, Prim. Dr. Ivo Matrljan, was a Croatian gynaecologist and recipient of the honorary title of Primarius at Sušak Hospital, while his great-grandfather, Ivan Matrljan (1891–1956), was a prominent cultural figure in Trsat, serving as conductor of the Trsat Brass Band and as an active member of the Hrvatska čitaonica Trsat. A street in Rijeka, Ulica Ivana Matrljana, is named in his honour.

Matrljan began playing football in the youth system of NK Orijent, where he developed as a striker under coach Vedran Malvić. He progressed through the club’s youth ranks before making his senior debut in 1978. During four seasons with Orijent, he established himself as one of the club’s most promising attacking players, earning a transfer to HNK Rijeka in 1982.

Matrljan graduated from the Faculty of Kinesiology, University of Zagreb. He also holds a Croatian Pro coaching licence issued by the Croatian Football Federation and a UEFA A coaching licence.
