= Radoslav Radulović =

Bosnian-Herzegovinian footballer (born 1972)

Radoslav Radulović Радослав Радуловић
Personal information
- Date of birth: 19 November 1972 (age 53)
- Place of birth: Banja Luka, SR Bosnia and Herzegovina, Yugoslavia
- Height: 1.82 m (6 ft 0 in)
- Position: Central defender

Senior career*
Years	Team	Apps	(Gls)
1995–1998	Zemun	67	(6)
1998–1999	Lleida	23	(2)
1999	Enköpings SK	14	(0)
2000–2001	Lleida	3	(0)
2001	Zemun	24	(1)
2002	Rad	15	(0)
2003	Hapoel Kfar Saba	23	(0)
2003–2004	Enköpings SK	9	(0)
2004–2009	Benavent	?	(?)
Total		178	(9)
- * Club domestic league appearances and goals

Radoslav Radulović (Serbian Cyrillic: Радослав Радуловић; born 19 November 1972) is a Bosnian former professional footballer who played as a central defender.

== Career ==
Born in Banja Luka, SR Bosnia and Herzegovina, he started his career playing in Serbia with FK Zemun in the First League of FR Yugoslavia. In 1998, he moved to Spain and played two and a half seasons in UE Lleida. In January 2001, he returned to FK Zemun, before moving in 2002 to Israeli club Hapoel Kfar Saba where he played one season. Next, he moved to Sweden where he represented Enköpings SK for two seasons (where already had played earlier in 1999), and since January 2005, he played with Spanish club FC Benavent until 2010.

== Sources ==
- Profile at Srbijafudbal
