= FC Benavent =

Benavent
- Full name: Futbol Club Benavent
- Founded: 1981
- Dissolved: 2010
- Ground: Municipal, Benavent de Segrià, Catalonia, Spain
- Capacity: 1,200
- 2009–10: 3ª – Group 5, 16th of 20
- Website: http://www.fcbenavent.com/
Home colours	Away colours

Futbol Club Benavent was a football team from Benavent de Segrià in the autonomous community of Catalonia, Spain. Founded in 1981 and dissolved in June 2010 due to lack of support, it played its last season, 2009–10, in the Tercera División - Group 5. Its stadium was Municipal with a capacity of 1,200 seats.

== History ==
FC Benavent was founded in 1981. On 12 June 2010, FC Benavent and JE Ascó merged into FC Ascó. The new club moves from Benavent de Segrià to Ascó. The reasons of the merger and consequent move were the little support that FC Benavent received in the town.

== Season to season ==
Season	Tier	Division	Place	Copa del Rey
1981–82	8	3ª Reg.	16th	
1982–83	8	3ª Reg.	16th	
1983–84	8	3ª Reg.	12th	
1984–85	8	3ª Reg.	7th	
1985–86	8	3ª Reg.	1st	
1986–87	7	2ª Reg.	12th	
1987–88	7	2ª Reg.	10th	
1988–1995	DNP			
1995–96	9	3ª Terr.	9th	
1996–97	9	3ª Terr.	10th	
1997–98	9	3ª Terr.	6th	
1998–99	9	3ª Terr.	6th	

Season	Tier	Division	Place	Copa del Rey
1999–2000	9	3ª Terr.	1st	
2000–01	8	2ª Terr.	2nd	
2001–02	7	1ª Terr.	7th	
2002–03	7	1ª Terr.	5th	
2003–04	7	1ª Terr.	2nd	
2004–05	6	Pref. Terr.	6th	
2005–06	6	Pref. Terr.	5th	
2006–07	6	Pref. Terr.	1st	
2007–08	5	1ª Cat.	9th	
2008–09	5	1ª Cat.	1st	
2009–10	4	3ª	16th	

- 1 season in Tercera División

== Last squad ==
Note: Flags indicate national team as defined under FIFA eligibility rules; some limited exceptions apply. Players may hold more than one non-FIFA nationality.

No.	Pos.	Nation	Player
—	GK	(Spain) ESP	David Ballesteros
—	GK	(Spain) ESP	Marc Puigvert
—	DF	(Spain) ESP	Marcel Galera
—	DF	(Spain) ESP	Ismael Camps
—	DF	(Spain) ESP	Héctor Besora
—	DF	(Bosnia and Herzegovina) BIH	Radoslav Radulović
—	DF	(Spain) ESP	Dani Hernández
—	DF	(Spain) ESP	Xavi Tosas
—	DF	(Spain) ESP	Iván Izquierdo
—	MF	(Spain) ESP	Xavier Padrones
—	MF	(Spain) ESP	Xavier Gracia

No.	Pos.	Nation	Player
—	MF	(Spain) ESP	Kike Palau
—	MF	(Spain) ESP	Sergio Flamarique
—	MF	(Spain) ESP	Félix Redondo (Captain)
—	FW	(Spain) ESP	Francesc Salat
—	FW	(Spain) ESP	Adrià Fernández
—	FW	(Spain) ESP	Jesús Rey
—	FW	(Spain) ESP	Josep Maria Peña
—	FW	(Spain) ESP	David Cámara "Romario"
—	FW	(Spain) ESP	Paco del Moral
—	FW	(Spain) ESP	Eric Pla
