= Dumitru Mitu =

Romanian footballer

Personal information
- Date of birth: 13 February 1975 (age 51)
- Place of birth: Bucharest, Romania
- Height: 1.80 m (5 ft 11 in)
- Positions: Winger; forward

Youth career
- 1981–1992: Faur București

Senior career*
Years	Team	Apps	(Gls)
1992–1993	Faur București	18	(5)
1993–1995	Steaua București	0	(0)
1994–1995	→ Farul Constanța (loan)	7	(0)
1995	→ Brașov (loan)	11	(0)
1995–1996	UTA Arad	30	(6)
1996–2002	NK Osijek	160	(26)
2002–2004	Dinamo Zagreb	58	(15)
2004–2005	Panathinaikos	6	(0)
2005	HNK Rijeka	18	(6)
2005–2006	Dinamo Zagreb	11	(1)
2006–2007	CFR Cluj	12	(1)
2007	→ Unirea Dej (loan)	8	(1)
2007–2008	Qingdao Zhongneng	26	(4)
2008–2009	Changchun Yatai	4	(0)
2009	UTA Arad	9	(2)
2013–2015	Şoimii Pâncota	9	(2)
2016	Șoimii Pâncota	6	(1)
Total		393	(70)

Managerial career
- 2013–2016: Şoimii Pâncota (assistant)
- 2016: Şoimii Pâncota (assistant)
- * Club domestic league appearances and goals

Dumitru Mitu (born 13 February 1975), also known as "Bebe Mitu", is a Romanian former professional footballer who played as a winger or forward.

== Early life ==
Mitu was born in Bucharest, but spent his childhood years in the nearby village of Dobroieşti. His father worked at the village bar, while his mother was a kiosk saleswoman. At age six and a half he started to play as a junior for Metalul (Faur) București, then a second division club, eventually reaching the first team. In 1992, aged 17, he signed for Steaua's junior squad.

== Career ==
In 1992 Mitu started his senior football career in his hometown team of Faur București, then joining Steaua București, where he was loaned out to Farul Constanţa and FC Braşov. He also played for UTA Arad, before moving to NK Osijek during the 1996–1997 season. He was a big star at the Croatian side. After 159 appearances and 26 goals for NK Osijek and seven years spent at club, he transferred to Dinamo, where he won four national championships. Then he was sold to Greek Panathinaikos and he played there 6 games mainly in UEFA Champions League.

Shortly after UEFA Champions League champaign at Panathinaikos he returned to Croatia with HNK Rijeka. After one season he returns to Dinamo Zagreb where he won First League title. Then he returns to homeland at CFR Cluj where he played 12 games with one goal but in second season leadership of CFR Cluj decided to cancel the Mitu's contract. The player came at CFR Cluj from Dinamo Zagreb and had a contract of 70,000 dollars per season. He scored just one goal for CFR Cluj in second part of last season. In this season, Mitu did not play any minute at CFR Cluj, being sent to train and to play at second team, Unirea Dej, after the leadership heard that he spent multiple nights in a night club. "It was the decision of the leadership, because I had decided to give him another chance. But he disappointed me with his declarations after the match with Dinamo, when he told the press that I prefer to send on the field the foreign players of CFR Cluj", said coach Cristiano Bergodi. Because CFR Cluj cancelled the contract of Dumitru Mitu, the player became a free agent. The officials of Jiul said they are interested in bringing Mitu at Petroşani in the winter transfer window. The player said that nobody told him that, but that he would gladly come from winter at Jiul.

The forward who cancelled his contract with CFR then started training together with the team from Arad. "Mitu asked me if he can train with us. I let him because I know what it means to be a player and to have no team where to train", said Lăcătuș, who did not change his mind about the transfer of Mitu at UTA Arad. "I prefer to bring younger players, till 25–26 years old, but with some experience in Liga 1", said the coach of UTA Arad.

During the 2006–2007 season he played for Chinese Super League with the Chinese football club Qingdao Zhongneng.

Mitu initially retired from football in 2009, after a season at UTA, but came out of retirement to play a few times for Șoimii Pâncota between 2013 and 2016, also being their assistant manager during that period.

Mitu is a dual citizen of Romania and Croatia. He gained Croatian citizenship in 2003.

== Honours ==
NK Osijek

- Croatian Cup: 1998–99

Dinamo Zagreb

- Croatian League: 2002–03, 2005–06
- Croatian Cup: 2003–04
- Croatian Supercup: 2002, 2003

HNK Rijeka

- Croatian Cup: 2004–05
