= Miro Varvodić =

Croatian footballer

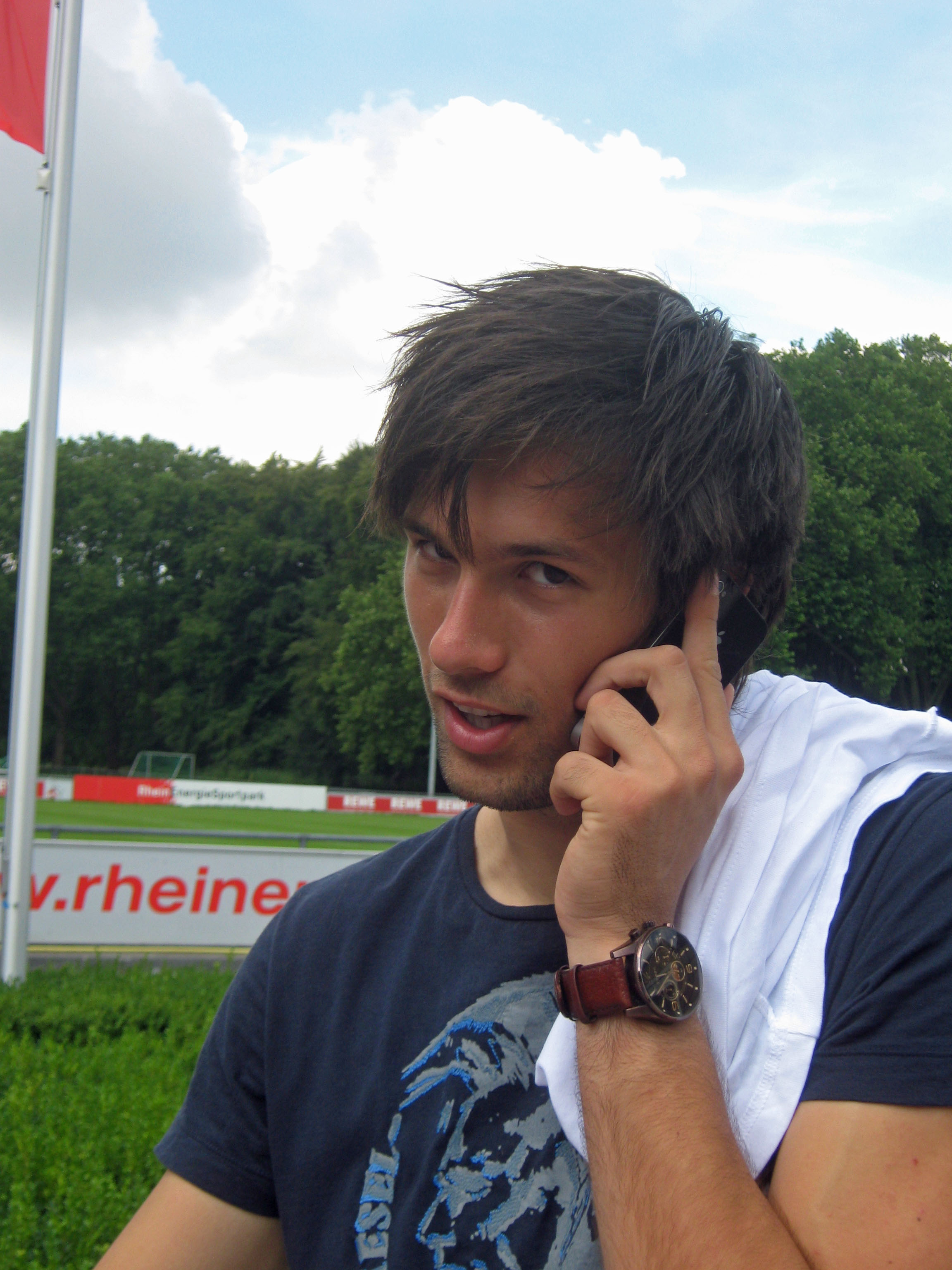
- Varvodić in 2010

Personal information
- Full name: Miro Varvodić
- Date of birth: 15 May 1989 (age 37)
- Place of birth: Split, SFR Yugoslavia
- Position: Goalkeeper

Team information
- Current team: Dugopolje
- Number: 1

Youth career
- Hajduk Split

Senior career*
Years	Team	Apps	(Gls)
2006–2010	Hajduk Split	12	(0)
2007	→ Mosor (loan)	16	(0)
2008–2010	→ 1. FC Köln (loan)	0	(0)
2010–2012	1. FC Köln	7	(0)
2012–2013	Qarabağ	17	(0)
2014–2015	Greuther Fürth II	3	(0)
2017	SV Horn	5	(0)
2017–2018	Stuttgarter Kickers	9	(0)
2019–2020	Waldhof Mannheim	5	(0)
2020–2021	Zrinjski Mostar	13	(0)
2023–	Dugopolje	4	(0)

International career
2005	Croatia U17	1	(0)
2007–2008	Croatia U19	10	(0)
- * Club domestic league appearances and goals as of 19 June 2023

Miro Varvodić (born 15 May 1989) is a Croatian professional footballer who plays as a goalkeeper for Dugopolje.

== Career ==
Born in Split, Varvodić began his career in the youth of hometown club Hajduk Split, making his professional debut in 2006. In 2007, he spent a loan spell at Mosor and the following two seasons in Germany with 1. FC Köln. After the two-year loan finished, 1. FC Köln signed Varvodić on a permanent deal. He made his Bundesliga debut on 15 October 2010.

On 23 June 2012, he signed a two-year deal with club Qarabağ. In February 2014 Varvodić moved to Greuther Fürth.

He moved to Austrian club SV Horn in 2017.

On 10 January 2019, SV Waldhof Mannheim announced the signing of Varvodić.

On 3 November 2020, he signed a two-year contract with Bosnian Premier League club Zrinjski Mostar. Varvodić left Zrinjski in June 2021.

== Personal life ==
Miro's father is Zoran Varvodić.
