= Davor Radmanović =

Croatian footballer

Personal information
- Date of birth: 12 September 1957 (age 69)
- Place of birth: Rijeka, SR Croatia, SFR Yugoslavia
- Position: Midfielder

Senior career*
Years	Team	Apps	(Gls)
1977–1978	Rijeka	1	(0)
1978–1980	Maribor	49	(7)
1980–1987	Rijeka	94	(18)
1987–1990	Hércules	71	(15)
1990	Orihuela Deportiva	0	(0)
1991–1993	Español San Vicente		
1993–1994	Alicante		

Managerial career
- 1994–1996: Águilas
- 1998–1999: Eldense
- 2001: Benidorm
- 2001–2003: Las Palas
- 2007–2009: Pinoso
- 2010–2011: CD Maristas Alicante (youth)
- 2011–2012: Alicante (youth)
- 2012–2013: Hércules (youth)
- 2013–: CD El Cabo
- * Club domestic league appearances and goals

Davor Radmanović (born 12 September 1957) is a Croatian former professional footballer who played as a midfielder.

== Career ==
Born in Rijeka, he is originally from Labin. As a player, he spent much of his career (eight seasons) playing for his hometown team, HNK Rijeka. He was one of the club's most important midfielders during the mid-1980s. For the club, he scored important goals in the 1986–87 Yugoslav Cup final against Hajduk Split, and in the 1986-87 UEFA Cup game against Standard Liège. From Rijeka he moved to Spain, where he played for seven years until the end of his career. He played for four clubs, including Hércules CF and Alicante CF.

== Career statistics ==
Appearances and goals by club, season and competition
Club	Season	League			National cup		Continental		Total	
Club	Season	Division	Apps	Goals	Apps	Goals	Apps	Goals	Apps	Goals
NK Rijeka	1977–78	Yugoslav First League	1	0	0	0	–		1	0
Maribor	1978–79	Yugoslav Second League (West)	26	4	–		–		26	4
Maribor	1979–80	Yugoslav Second League (West)	23	3	3	0	–		23	3
Maribor	Total		49	7	3	0	0	0	52	7
NK Rijeka	1980–81	Yugoslav First League	0	0	0	0	–		0	0
NK Rijeka	1981–82	Yugoslav First League	0	0	0	0	–		0	0
NK Rijeka	1982–83	Yugoslav First League	0	0	0	0	–		0	0
NK Rijeka	1983–84	Yugoslav First League	30	7	3	0	–		33	7
NK Rijeka	1984–85	Yugoslav First League	22	6	2	1	4	0	28	7
NK Rijeka	1985–86	Yugoslav First League	12	0	0	0	–		28	7
NK Rijeka	1986–87	Yugoslav First League	30	5	8	1	2	1	40	7
NK Rijeka	Total		94	18	13	2	6	1	113	21
Hércules	1987–88	Segunda División	35	9	5	1	–		40	10
Hércules	1988–89	Segunda División B	19	3	0	0	–		19	3
Hércules	1989–90	Segunda División B	17	3	0	0	–		17	3
Hércules	Total		71	15	5	1	0	0	76	16
Orihuela Deportiva	1990–91	Segunda División	0	0	–		–		0	0
Career total			215	40	21	3	6	1	242	44

== Honours ==
NK Rijeka

- Yugoslav Cup: 1978

NK Maribor

- Slovenian Republic Cup: 1979
