= Zoran Varvodić =

Croatian footballer

Personal information
- Date of birth: 26 December 1963 (age 62)
- Place of birth: Split, SFR Yugoslavia
- Position: Goalkeeper

Senior career*
Years	Team	Apps	(Gls)
1983–1984	GOŠK-Jug	16	(0)
1984–1988	Hajduk Split	62	(0)
1988–1990	Spartak Subotica	64	(0)
1990–1992	Olimpija Ljubljana	44	(0)
1992–1993	Cádiz	15	(0)
1993–1994	HNK Dubrovnik	12	(0)
1994–1995	Primorac Stobreč	30	(0)
1995–1996	Zadarkomerc	4	(0)
1996–1997	Korotan	14	(0)
1997–2000	RNK Split		
Total		261	(0)
- * Club domestic league appearances and goals

Zoran Varvodić (born 26 December 1963) is a Croatian retired footballer who played as a goalkeeper.

== Early and personal life ==
Born in Split, Varvodić's son Miro is also a professional footballer. During the 1980s, he was nicknamed "Rambo" because of the similar hairstyle he wore at the time.

== Career ==
Varvodić played throughout Yugoslavia for GOŠK-Jug, Hajduk Split, Spartak Subotica and Olimpija Ljubljana, then after Yugoslav break-up with Croatian clubs Dubrovnik, Primorac Stobreč, NK Zadar, RNK Split, and in Slovenia with Korotan. He also played in Spain for Cádiz.

=== 1987 Yugoslav Cup final ===
He is famous amongst Hajduk Split fans thanks to his epic performance in the 1986–87 Yugoslav Cup final against NK Rijeka. He entered the game in the 119th minute so that he can join the penalty shootout where he managed to save 3 penalties and score the winning one.
