= Lăcătuș =

Lăcătuș or Lăcătușu is an occupational Romanian surname that means locksmith. Notable people with the surname include:

- Daniel Lăcătuș (born 1988), Romanian journalist, poet and writer
- Constantin Lăcătușu (born 1961), Romanian mountain climber
- Izabela Lăcătuș (born 1976), Romanian artistic and aerobic gymnast
- Marius Lăcătuș (born 1964), Romanian football player
- Mihaela Lăcătuș (born 1981), Romanian boxer
