= Benavent de Segrià =

- Municipality
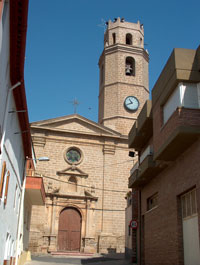
- Church, Benavent de Segrià

- Flag Coat of arms

- Location in Catalonia Benavent de Segrià (Spain)
- Coordinates: 41°41′45″N 0°37′59″E
- Country: Spain
- Community: Catalonia
- Province: Lleida
- Comarca: Segrià

Government
  - Mayor: Manel Català Ros (2015)

Area
  - Total: 7.4 km^{2} (2.9 sq mi)
- Elevation: 234 m (768 ft)

Population (2025-01-01)
  - Total: 1,571
  - Density: 210/km^{2} (550/sq mi)
- Website: benaventdesegria.cat

Benavent de Segrià (Catalan pronunciation: [benaˈβen de seɣɾiˈa]) is a village in the province of Lleida and autonomous community of Catalonia, Spain.

It has a population of 1,571 (register office, 2025).

The town is located near the city of Lleida, and has a town square, bars, cafés, and small restaurants, as well as a church, and 2 parks in the area.
