= Zoran Škerjanc =

Croatian footballer

Personal information
- Full name: Zoran Škerjanc
- Date of birth: 25 November 1964 (age 61)
- Place of birth: Suha Katalena, SFR Yugoslavia
- Position: Midfielder

Senior career*
Years	Team	Apps	(Gls)
1982–1988	Rijeka	92	(13)
1988–1990	Dinamo Zagreb	40	(5)
1990	Recreativo Huelva	5	(0)
1990–1991	Orléans		
1991–1992	Rijeka	20	(6)
1992–1994	Pazinka	31	(3)
1994–1995	Göttingen 05		
1995–1996	Slavonija	9	(1)
- * Club domestic league appearances and goals

Zoran Škerjanc (born 25 November 1964) is a Croatian former football player who played for Rijeka, Dinamo, Recreativo Huelva, Orléans US, Pazinka and Göttingen 05.

== Career statistics ==
=== As a player ===
Club performance			League		Cup		Continental		Total	
Season	Club	League	Apps	Goals	Apps	Goals	Apps	Goals	Apps	Goals
Yugoslavia			League		Yugoslav Cup		Europe		Total	
1982-83	NK Rijeka	Yugoslav First League	6	1	0	0	–		6	1
1983–84	NK Rijeka	Yugoslav First League	4	0	0	0	–		4	0
1984–85	NK Rijeka	Yugoslav First League	12	1	0	0	0	0	12	1
1985–86	NK Rijeka	Yugoslav First League	18	1	1	0	–		19	1
1986–87	NK Rijeka	Yugoslav First League	20	1	6	0	2	0	28	1
1987–88	NK Rijeka	Yugoslav First League	32	9	1	0	–		33	9
1988-89	Dinamo Zagreb	Yugoslav First League	33	3	5	0	4	0	43	3
1989-90	Dinamo Zagreb	Yugoslav First League	8	2	1	0	2	0	11	2
Spain		Yugoslav First League	League		Copa del Rey		Europe		Total	
1989-90	Recreativo de Huelva	Segunda División	5	0	–		–		5	0
France			League		Coupe de France		Europe		Total	
1990-91	Orléans US	Division 2	–		–		–		0	0
Croatia			League		Croatian Cup		Europe		Total	
1992	NK Rijeka	Prva HNL	20	6	3	0	–		23	6
1992–93	NK Pazinka	Prva HNL	9	1	–		–		9	1
1993–94	NK Pazinka	Prva HNL	22	2	2	0	–		24	0
Germany			League		DFB Pokal		Europe		Total	
1994–95	1. SC Göttingen 05	Regionalliga Nord	–		1	0	–		1	0
Croatia			League		Croatian Cup		Europe		Total	
1995–96	NK Slavonija	Prva B HNL	9	1	–		–		9	1
NK Rijeka total			112	19	11	0	2	0	125	21
Career total			198	28	20	0	8	0	226	28
