= Predrag Valenčić =

Croatian footballer

Personal information
- Full name: Predrag Valenčić
- Date of birth: 2 October 1963 (age 63)
- Place of birth: Rijeka, SR Croatia, SFR Yugoslavia
- Position: Midfielder

Youth career
- Klana

Senior career*
| Years | Team | Apps | (Gls) |
| 1984 -1989 | Rijeka | 113 | (14) |
| 1990 -1991 | Rijeka | 0 | (0) |
| 1992 | Orijent | | |
- * Club domestic league appearances and goals

Predrag Valenčić (born 2 October 1963) is a Croatian retired football player.

== Career ==
Born in Rijeka, as a player he spent much of his career with HNK Rijeka, where he collected over 100 caps and scored 14 goals in the Yugoslav First League from 1984 to 1989 and 1990-1991. He played against Standard Liège in the 1986-87 UEFA Cup and in the 1986-87 Yugoslav Cup final against Hajduk Split.

== Career statistics ==
| Season | Club | League | League | | Cup | | Europe | | Total | |
| Season | Club | League | Apps | Goals | Apps | Goals | Apps | Goals | Apps | Goals |
|---|---|---|---|---|---|---|---|---|---|---|
| 1984–85 | NK Rijeka | Yugoslav First League | 10 | 7 | 0 | 0 | 0 | 0 | 10 | 7 |
| 1985–86 | NK Rijeka | Yugoslav First League | 27 | 2 | 2 | 0 | – | | 29 | 2 |
| 1986–87 | NK Rijeka | Yugoslav First League | 27 | 1 | 5 | 0 | 1 | 0 | 33 | 1 |
| 1987–88 | NK Rijeka | Yugoslav First League | 12 | 0 | 0 | 0 | – | | 12 | 0 |
| 1988–89 | NK Rijeka | Yugoslav First League | 30 | 4 | 0 | 0 | – | | 30 | 4 |
| 1989–90 | NK Rijeka | Yugoslav First League | 7 | 0 | 0 | 0 | – | | 7 | 0 |
| Career total | | | 113 | 14 | 7 | 0 | 1 | 0 | 121 | 14 |
