= Nenad Gračan =

Croatian footballer and manager

Personal information
- Full name: Nenad Gračan
- Date of birth: 23 January 1962 (age 64)
- Place of birth: Rijeka, PR Croatia, Yugoslavia
- Height: 1.79 m (5 ft 10 in)
- Position: Midfielder

Team information
- Current team: Croatia (women) (manager)

Youth career
- Rijeka

Senior career*
Years	Team	Apps	(Gls)
1979–1986	Rijeka	136	(31)
1979–1980	→ Orijent (loan)		
1986–1989	Hajduk Split	25	(2)
1989–1993	Oviedo	90	(1)
1995–1996	Rijeka	10	(1)
Total		261	(35)

International career
1984	Yugoslavia Olympic	6	(1)
1984–1986	Yugoslavia	10	(2)

Managerial career
- 1995–1996: Rijeka
- 1998–2000: Rijeka
- 2001: Hajduk Split
- 2002–2003: Sport Line Koper
- 2003: Osijek
- 2003–2004: Kamen Ingrad
- 2004: Dinamo Zagreb
- 2005–2006: Pomorac Kostrena
- 2007: Pula 1856
- 2008: Nafta Lendava
- 2009: Croatia Sesvete
- 2009–2010: Rijeka
- 2010–2011: Rijeka
- 2013–2019: Croatia U-21
- 2021–: Croatia women
Medal record
Men's football
Representing Yugoslavia
Olympic Games
Bronze medal – third place	1984 Los Angeles	Team
- * Club domestic league appearances and goals

Nenad Gračan (born 23 January 1962) is a Croatian football manager and former player who played as a midfielder. He is the coach of the Croatia women's national football team.

== Club career ==
Born in Rijeka, SFR Yugoslavia, Gračan started playing professionally for hometown's NK Orijent and, soon thereafter, HNK Rijeka, amassing nearly 150 official appearances. He then moved to another club in his native Croatia, HNK Hajduk Split. During his first match at Hajduk Gračan was injured while playing against his former club by Mladen Mladenović who nearly broke Gračan's leg. Because of this injury he appeared intermittently for Hajduk over the course of four full seasons.

Late into 1989, Gračan signed with La Liga club Real Oviedo. Joined by compatriots Janko Janković and Nikola Jerkan in his second season, he helped the Asturians finish sixth and qualify for the UEFA Cup by contributing with 26 matches, and eventually appeared in more than 100 games overall.

Aged almost 31, Gračan left Oviedo and returned to his country, now independent. After two years of inactivity he played a handful of games with first professional club Rijeka, but retired shortly after. In the following decade, he took up coaching, starting with his last team as a player, but he rarely settled.

== International career ==
Gračan made his debut for Yugoslavia in a March 1984 friendly match against Hungary and earned a total of 10 caps, scoring 2 goals. He never attended any major international tournament. In 1984, the then 21-year-old helped the Olympic squad win the bronze medal in Los Angeles, featuring in all games but one and scoring in the quarterfinals against West Germany (5–2). His final international was a May 1986 friendly away against Belgium.

=== International appearances ===
Yugoslavia national team
Year	Apps	Goals
1984	3	0
1985	4	0
1986	3	2
Total	10	2

=== International goals ===
Goal	Date	Venue	Opponent	Score	Result	Competition
1	30 April 1986	Arruda, Recife	Brazil	1 – 1	4 – 2	Friendly
2	19 May 1986	Heizelstadion, Brussels	Belgium	0 – 2	1 – 3	Friendly

== Managerial career ==
In June 2001, he was named manager of Hajduk Split. Gračan was dismissed as manager of Pula in May 2007 and he took charge of Rijeka for a third time in November 2009.

== Personal life ==
Gračan married former miss Croatia Daniela Mihalic in 1999. The couple have three daughters.

== Career statistics ==
=== As a player ===
Club performance			League		Cup		Continental		Total	
Season	Club	League	Apps	Goals	Apps	Goals	Apps	Goals	Apps	Goals
Yugoslavia			League		Yugoslav Cup		Europe		Total	
1979–80	NK Rijeka	Yugoslav First League	3	0	0	0	—		3	0
1980–81	NK Rijeka	Yugoslav First League	—		—		—		0	0
1981–82	NK Rijeka	Yugoslav First League	12	4	0	0	—		11	4
1982–83	NK Rijeka	Yugoslav First League	31	5	4	2	—		36	7
1983–84	NK Rijeka	Yugoslav First League	31	8	3	1	—		34	9
1984–85	NK Rijeka	Yugoslav First League	29	7	1	0	4	0	34	7
1985–86	NK Rijeka	Yugoslav First League	30	7	1	0	—		31	7
1986–87	NK Hajduk Split	Yugoslav First League	1	1	0	0	—		1	1
1987–88	NK Hajduk Split	Yugoslav First League	2	0	0	0	—		2	0
1988–89	NK Hajduk Split	Yugoslav First League	16	0	1	0	—		17	0
1989–90	NK Hajduk Split	Yugoslav First League	6	1	1	0	—		7	1
Spain			League		Copa del Rey		Europe		Total	
1989–90	Real Oviedo	La Liga	23	1	0	0	—		23	1
1990–91	Real Oviedo	La Liga	26	0	0	0	—		26	0
1991–92	Real Oviedo	La Liga	16	0	0	0	—		16	0
1992–93	Real Oviedo	La Liga	25	0	4	1	—		29	1
Croatia			League		Croatian Cup		Europe		Total	
1995–96	HNK Rijeka	Prva HNL	10	1	3	0	—		13	1
Country	HNK Rijeka		146	32	12	3	4	0	162	35
Country	NK Hajduk Split		25	2	2	0	0	0	27	2
Country	Real Oviedo		90	1	4	1	0	0	94	2
Total			261	35	18	4	4	0	283	39

=== Managerial statistics ===
As of 18 November 2018

=== Club ===
Club	From	To	Competition	Record				
Club	From	To	Competition	P	W	D	L	Win %
HNK Rijeka	26 November 1995	22 May 1996	Prva HNL	15	8	2	5	53.33
HNK Rijeka	26 November 1995	22 May 1996	Croatian Cup	1	0	0	1	0.00
HNK Rijeka	15 March 1998	11 November 2000	Prva HNL	87	43	16	28	49.43
HNK Rijeka	15 March 1998	11 November 2000	Croatian Cup	7	2	2	3	28.57
HNK Rijeka	15 March 1998	11 November 2000	UEFA Champions League	2	0	0	2	0.00
HNK Rijeka	15 March 1998	11 November 2000	UEFA Cup	4	2	1	1	50.00
HNK Rijeka Total				116	55	21	40	47.41
Hajduk Split	25 July 2001	21 November 2001	Prva HNL	15	10	2	3	66.67
Hajduk Split	25 July 2001	21 November 2001	Croatian Cup	2	1	0	1	50.00
Hajduk Split	25 July 2001	21 November 2001	UEFA Champions League	4	2	1	1	50.00
Hajduk Split	25 July 2001	21 November 2001	UEFA Cup	2	0	1	1	0.00
Hajduk Split Total				23	13	4	6	56.52
Sport Line Koper	14 July 2002	30 March 2003	PrvaLiga	24	10	7	7	41.67
Sport Line Koper	14 July 2002	30 March 2003	Slovenian Cup	1	0	1	0	0.00
Sport Line Koper Total				25	10	8	7	40.00
NK Osijek	10 May 2003	31 May 2003	Prva HNL	4	2	1	1	50.00
NK Osijek Total				4	2	1	1	50.00
NK Kamen Ingrad	26 July 2003	28 August 2004	Prva HNL	38	16	7	15	42.11
NK Kamen Ingrad	26 July 2003	28 August 2004	Croatian Cup	4	2	0	2	50.00
NK Kamen Ingrad	26 July 2003	28 August 2004	UEFA Cup	4	2	1	1	50.00
NK Kamen Ingrad	26 July 2003	28 August 2004	UEFA Intertoto Cup	2	0	0	2	0.00
Kamen Ingrad Total				48	20	8	20	41.67
Dinamo Zagreb	11 September 2004	20 November 2004	Prva HNL	10	5	2	3	50.00
Dinamo Zagreb	11 September 2004	20 November 2004	Croatian Cup	2	1	0	1	50.00
Dinamo Zagreb	11 September 2004	20 November 2004	UEFA Cup	3	2	1	0	66.67
Dinamo Zagreb Total				15	8	3	4	53.33
Pomorac Kostrena	21 August 2005	26 November 2006	Druga HNL	47	24	15	8	51.06
Pomorac Kostrena	21 August 2005	26 November 2006	Croatian Cup	2	0	0	2	0.00
Pomorac Kostrena Total				49	24	15	10	48.98
Pula Staročeško	17 February 2007	12 May 2007	Prva HNL	14	2	4	8	14.29
Pula Staročeško Total				14	2	4	8	14.29
NK Nafta Lendava	1 March 2008	22 March 2008	PrvaLiga	4	0	1	3	0.00
NK Nafta Lendava Total				4	0	1	3	0.00
NK Croatia Sesvete	12 September 2009	7 November 2009	Prva HNL	8	1	1	6	12.50
NK Croatia Sesvete	12 September 2009	7 November 2009	Croatian Cup	1	0	0	1	0.00
NK Croatia Sesvete Total				9	1	1	7	11.11
HNK Rijeka	21 November 2009	13 May 2010	Prva HNL	16	5	5	6	31.25
HNK Rijeka	24 July 2010	6 November 2010	Prva HNL	14	6	3	5	42.86
HNK Rijeka	24 July 2010	6 November 2010	Croatian Cup	2	2	0	0	100.00
HNK Rijeka Total				32	13	8	11	40.63
Totals				339	148	74	117	43.66

=== National team ===
Team	From	To	Record							
Team	From	To	Croatia U21	25 October 2013	12 September 2019	38	20	9	9	52.63

*Dates of first and last games under Gračan; not dates of official appointments

== Honours ==
=== Player ===
Hajduk Split

- Yugoslav Cup: 1987

Yugoslavia

- Summer Olympics bronze medal: 1984

Individual

- SN Yellow Shirt award: 1985–86
- NK Rijeka all time XI by Novi list
