= Igor Jelavić =

Croatian footballer

Personal information
- Full name: Igor Jelavić
- Date of birth: 1962 (age 63–64)
- Place of birth: Split, SFR Yugoslavia
- Position: Defender

Senior career*
Years	Team	Apps	(Gls)
1981–1983	Solin	31	(4)
1984–1985	Split	30	(8)
1985–1988	Rijeka	85	(0)
1988–1989	Hajduk Split	11	(0)
1989–1990	UR Namur		
1990–1992	Zagreb	27	(0)
1992–1994	VfB Wissen		
- * Club domestic league appearances and goals

Igor Jelavić (born 1962) is a retired Croatian football player who played for HNK Rijeka, Hajduk Split, NK Zagreb, NK Split and NK Solin.

== Personal life ==
He is Mario Jelavić's father and Ivan Perišić's uncle.
