= Boris Tičić =

Croatian football manager

Personal information
- Date of birth: 22 May 1957 (age 69)
- Position: Defender

Senior career*
Years	Team	Apps	(Gls)
–1982	Orijent		
1982–1986	Rijeka	69	(1)
1986–1987	Arminia Bielefeld	9	(0)

Managerial career
- 1996-1997: Orijent
- 1998: Zadar
- 1999: Široki Brijeg
- 2000: Rijeka
- 2008: Pomorac Kostrena
- 2009-2010: Rudar Labin
- 2011: Crikvenica
- 2017-2018: Sabunjar
- * Club domestic league appearances and goals

Boris Tičić (born 22 May 1957) is a Croatian football defender and later manager.

== Playing career ==
Tičić played for Orijent before joining local rivals Rijeka. He played for them in the famous home win over Real Madrid in the 1984–85 UEFA Cup as well as in the controversial away leg defeat.

== Managerial career ==
He replaced Nino Kos as manager of Rudar Labin in April 2009, after he was in charge of Pomorac Kostrena in the first part of that season. Tičić was named manager of Sabunjar in November 2017.
