= Janko Janković =

Croatian footballer

Personal information
- Date of birth: 14 January 1963 (age 63)
- Place of birth: Split, PR Croatia, FPR Yugoslavia
- Height: 1.86 m (6 ft 1 in)
- Position: Forward

Senior career*
Years	Team	Apps	(Gls)
1982–1983	Solin	21	(0)
1983–1984	Hajduk Split	2	(0)
1984–1985	RNK Split	27	(7)
1985–1988	Rijeka	98	(37)
1988–1990	Valladolid	67	(18)
1990–1995	Oviedo	157	(27)
1995–1997	Hércules	36	(11)
Total		428	(100)

International career
1994	Croatia	2	(0)

Managerial career
- 1997–1998: SD Colloto
- 1998–2002: University Oviedo B
- 2009: Deportiva (Assistant coach)
- 2009: Girona (Assistant coach)
- * Club domestic league appearances and goals

Janko Janković (born 14 January 1963) is a Croatian retired footballer who played as a forward.

== Club career ==
Janković was born in Split, Croatia, Socialist Federal Republic of Yugoslavia. After playing in his country with NK Solin, HNK Hajduk Split (only two matches in one full season), RNK Split and HNK Rijeka, the 25-year-old moved to Spain, where he would remain for nearly one full decade until his retirement.

Janković started at Real Valladolid, after signing at the same time as compatriot Mauro Ravnić – his teammate at Rijeka – and was an essential attacking element in his debut campaign, as the Castile and León club finished sixth in La Liga and reached the final of the Copa del Rey.

After another year, Janković signed with Real Oviedo, teaming up with another two Croatians, Nenad Gračan and Nikola Jerkan. With the Asturians he left much of the offensive burden to veteran striker Carlos, only scoring once in double digits but never suffering relegation during his five-year spell, and helping with three goals in 33 games in his debut campaign as the team qualified for the UEFA Cup.

Aged 32, Janković signed for Hércules CF, scoring ten times to help the Alicante side promote from the second division in his first year. After their immediate relegation, he retired from the game.

== International career ==
In 1994, Janković played two matches for the Croatia national team, his debut coming on 23 March as he featured the first half in a 2–0 friendly win against Spain, in Valencia.

== Career statistics ==
=== As a player ===
Club performance			League		Cup		Continental		Total	
Season	Club	League	Apps	Goals	Apps	Goals	Apps	Goals	Apps	Goals
Yugoslavia			League		Yugoslav Cup		Europe		Total	
1982–83	NK Solin	Yugoslav Second League	21	0	0	0	–	–	21	0
1983–84	Hajduk Split	Yugoslav First League	2	0	0	0	–	–	2	0
1984–85	RNK Split	Croatian Republic Football League (South)	27	7	-	-	–	–	27	7
1985–86	NK Rijeka	Yugoslav First League	32	9	2	1	–	–	34	10
1986–87	NK Rijeka	Yugoslav First League	33	19	8	4	2	0	43	23
1987–88	NK Rijeka	Yugoslav First League	33	9	1	0	-	-	34	9
Spain			League		Copa del Rey		Europe		Total	
1988–89	Real Valladolid	La Liga	36	8	0	0	–	–	36	8
1989–90	Real Valladolid	La Liga	31	10	0	0	5	0	36	10
1990–91	Real Oviedo	La Liga	33	3	0	0	–	–	33	3
1991–92	Real Oviedo	La Liga	29	3	0	0	1	0	30	3
1992–93	Real Oviedo	La Liga	37	13	9	2	-	-	46	15
1993–94	Real Oviedo	La Liga	33	7	4	2	-	-	37	9
1994–95	Real Oviedo	La Liga	25	1	2	0	-	-	27	1
1995–96	Hércules Alicante	Segunda División	18	10	4	0	–	–	22	10
1996–97	Hércules Alicante	La Liga	18	1	3	0	–	–	21	1
Country	Yugoslavia		148	44	11	5	2	0	159	46
Country	Spain		260	56	21	4	6	0	287	60
Country	Total		408	100	32	9	8	0	448	109

== Honours ==
Hajduk Split

- Yugoslav Cup: 1984

Hércules

- Segunda División: 1995–96
