= Mauro Ravnić =

Croatian retired footballer (born 1959)

Personal information
- Date of birth: 29 November 1959 (age 66)
- Place of birth: Rijeka, FPR Yugoslavia
- Height: 1.89 m (6 ft 2 in)
- Position: Goalkeeper

Senior career*
Years	Team	Apps	(Gls)
1977–1988	Rijeka	189	(0)
1988–1992	Valladolid	96	(0)
1992–1994	Lleida	75	(0)
Total		360	(0)

International career
1986–1987	Yugoslavia	6	(0)

Managerial career
- Prat
- 2009–2010: Benavent
- 2010–2011: Ascó
- * Club domestic league appearances and goals

Mauro Ravnić (born 29 November 1959) is a Croatian retired footballer who played as a goalkeeper.

He spent his 17-year professional career with Rijeka in his homeland, and Valladolid and Lleida in Spain. Subsequently, he worked as a goalkeeper coach and manager in the latter country.

== Playing career ==
=== Club ===
Born in Rijeka, Socialist Federal Republic of Yugoslavia, Ravnić started playing with hometown's NK Rijeka, making his professional debuts at the age of 18 and eventually appearing in over 200 official games. He moved abroad in 1988, signing with La Liga club Real Valladolid at the same time as compatriot Janko Janković – his teammate at Rijeka – and was an essential unit in his first year, as the Castile and León team finished sixth and reached the final of the Copa del Rey.

In the following seasons, Ravnić alternated between the bench and the posts, notably competing with René Higuita in the 1991–92 campaign, which ended in relegation. Aged 32, he signed with UE Lleida in the second division, helping it return to the top level after a 43-year absence whilst winning the Ricardo Zamora Trophy (only 20 goals conceded in all 38 matches).

=== International ===
During roughly one year, Ravnić earned six caps for the Yugoslavia national team. His debut came on 29 October 1986, in a 4–0 win over Turkey for the UEFA Euro 1988 qualifiers.

Ravnić last appearance was on 11 November 1987, for the same competition: he allowed four goals before half-time against England, being replaced by Vladan Radača in an eventual 1–4 loss.

== Managerial career ==
After the Catalans were immediately relegated back, Ravnić chose to retire, later working with Valladolid as a goalkeeper coach and returning to Lleida as a youth coordinator. His first head coaching experience would arrive in the following decade, with amateurs AE Prat and FC Benavent.

In 2010, Ravnić was appointed manager at newly formed FC Ascó, who competed in the Spanish fourth division. He also worked at Lleida's youth academy and was their sports director for three years.

== Personal life ==
While manager of Benavent, Ravnić was diagnosed with leukemia and needed to undergo chemotherapy.

== Career statistics ==
=== Club ===
Club performance			League		Cup		League Cup		Continental		Total	
Season	Club	League	Apps	Goals	Apps	Goals	Apps	Goals	Apps	Goals	Apps	Goals
Yugoslavia			League		Yugoslav Cup		League Cup		Europe		Total	
1977–78	Rijeka	Yugoslav First League	3	0	0	0	–	–	-	-	3	0
1978–79	Rijeka	Yugoslav First League	3	0	0	0	–	–	0	0	3	0
1979–80	Rijeka	Yugoslav First League	30	0	1	0	–	–	6	0	37	0
1980–81	Rijeka	Yugoslav First League	10	0	1	0	–	–	-	-	11	0
1981–82	Rijeka	Yugoslav First League	0	0	0	0	–	–	-	-	0	0
1982–83	Rijeka	Yugoslav First League	16	0	2	0	–	–	-	-	18	0
1983–84	Rijeka	Yugoslav First League	19	0	1	0	–	–	-	-	20	0
1984–85	Rijeka	Yugoslav First League	19	0	1	0	–	–	4	0	24	0
1985–86	Rijeka	Yugoslav First League	29	0	1	0	–	–	-	-	30	0
1986–87	Rijeka	Yugoslav First League	34	0	7	0	–	–	2	0	43	0
1987–88	Rijeka	Yugoslav First League	26	0	0	0	–	–	-	-	26	0
Spain			League		Copa del Rey		Supercopa de España		Europe		Total	
1988–89	Valladolid	La Liga	37	0	4	0	–	–	-	-	41	0
1989–90	Valladolid	La Liga	36	0	2	0	–	–	6	0	40	0
1990–91	Valladolid	La Liga	0	0	0	0	–	–	-	-	0	0
1991–92	Valladolid	La Liga	23	0	2	0	–	–	-	-	25	0
1992–93	Lleida	Segunda División	38	0	6	0	–	–	-	-	44	0
1993–94	Lleida	La Liga	37	0	1	0	–	–	6	0	38	0
Country	Yugoslavia		189	0	14	0	0	0	18	0	221	0
Country	Spain		171	0	0	15	0	0	0	0	186	0
Total			360	0	29	0	0	0	12	0	401	0

=== International ===
Yugoslavia
Year	Apps	Goals
1986	2	0
1987	4	0
Total	6	0

== Honours ==
Rijeka

- Yugoslav Cup: 1977–78, 1978–79
- Balkans Cup: 1977–78

Valladolid

- Copa del Rey runner-up: 1988–89

Lleida

- Segunda División: 1992–93

Individual

- Ricardo Zamora Trophy (Segunda División): 1992–93
