= Nikica Milenković =

Croatian footballer and manager (born 1959)

Personal information
- Date of birth: 30 September 1959 (age 67)
- Place of birth: Crikvenica, FPR Yugoslavia
- Position: Defender

Youth career
- Rijeka

Senior career*
Years	Team	Apps	(Gls)
1977–1979	Orijent		
1979–1987	Rijeka	168	(1)
1987–1988	Čelik Zenica	15	(0)
1988–1989	Real Burgos	33	(0)
1990–1991	Sabadell	17	(1)

Managerial career
- 1991–1996: Barcelona (Youth)
- 2021: Rudar Prijedor
- * Club domestic league appearances and goals

Nikica “Dido” Milenković (born 30 September 1959) is a Croatian professional football manager and former player.

== Playing career ==
Milenković last played for Sabadell in Spain’s Segunda División. He had spent much of his career playing for Rijeka in the Yugoslav First League, where he amassed 154 league appearances. After a season with Čelik Zenica, he moved to Spain where he played until he retired in 1991.

== Managerial career ==
Initially, after retiring, Milenković settled in Barcelona where he worked in the youth ranks of FC Barcelona and as a FIFA agent from 1991 until 1996. He then moved to Rijeka where he worked as director of football.

In June 2021, Milenković became the new manager of newly promoted Bosnian Premier League club Rudar Prijedor. He debuted as manager against Sloboda Tuzla with a loss, in a league game on 18 July 2021. Milenković guided the team to his first win as manager in a league game against Velež Mostar on 2 August 2021. He left Rudar in October 2021.

== Career statistics ==
Club performance			League		Cup		Continental		Total	
Season	Club	League	Apps	Goals	Apps	Goals	Apps	Goals	Apps	Goals
Yugoslavia			League		Yugoslav Cup		Europe		Total	
1979–80	Rijeka	Yugoslav First League	18	0	1	0	5	0	24	0
1980–81	Rijeka	Yugoslav First League	—		—		—		0	0
1981–82	Rijeka	Yugoslav First League	—		—		—		0	0
1982–83	Rijeka	Yugoslav First League	31	1	4	0	—		35	1
1983–84	Rijeka	Yugoslav First League	20	0	2	0	—		22	0
1984–85	Rijeka	Yugoslav First League	30	0	0	0	3	0	33	0
1985–86	Rijeka	Yugoslav First League	33	0	2	0	—		35	0
1986–87	Rijeka	Yugoslav First League	21	0	5	0	1	0	27	0
1987–88	Čelik Zenica	Yugoslav First League	15	0	2	0	—		17	0
Spain			League		Copa del Rey		Europe		Total	
1989–90	Real Burgos	Segunda División	33	0	—		—		33	0
1990–91	Sabadell	Segunda División	17	1	—		—		17	1
Country	Rijeka		168	1	16	0	9	0	193	1
Country	Total		218	2	16	0	9	0	243	2

== Managerial statistics ==
As of 3 October 2021

Managerial record by team and tenure
Team	From	To	Record							
Team	From	To	G	W	D	L	GF	GA	GD	Win %
Rudar Prijedor	11 June 2021	11 October 2021	13	3	3	7	18	22	−4	23.08
Total			13	3	3	7	18	22	−4	23.08
