= Nebojša Malbaša =

Serbian football manager and player

Personal information
- Date of birth: 25 June 1959 (age 67)
- Place of birth: Belgrade, PR Serbia, FPR Yugoslavia
- Position: Striker

Youth career
- Zmaj Zemun

Senior career*
Years	Team	Apps	(Gls)
1981–1986	Rijeka	118	(25)
1986–1987	Dinamo Zagreb	29	(5)
1987–1991	FC Liège	110	(46)
1991–1995	Charleroi	114	(42)
1995–1996	Standard Liège	16	(1)
1996–1997	Olympic Charleroi		
Total		387+	(119+)

Managerial career
- 1998–2000: Olympic Charleroi
- 2000: RFC Liège
- * Club domestic league appearances and goals

Nebojša Malbaša (Serbian Cyrillic: Небојша Малбаша; born 25 June 1959) is a Serbian former football manager and player.

== Playing career ==
After starting out with Zmaj Zemun, Malbaša played for Rijeka in the Yugoslav First League from 1981 to 1986, making 118 appearances and scoring 25 goals. In October 1984. he played in the famous win over Spanish giants Real Madrid in the UEFA Cup. He subsequently spent one year at Dinamo Zagreb.

In 1987, Malbaša moved abroad to Belgium and signed with FC Liège, where he formed a prolific partnership with compatriot Zvonko Varga. He appeared in 110 games and netted 46 times in the Belgian First Division over the next four seasons. Between 1991 and 1995, Malbaša played for Charleroi, amassing 114 appearances and scoring 42 goals in the top flight of Belgian football. He then spent one year at Standard Liège and another one at Olympic Charleroi before retiring.

== Managerial career ==
After hanging up his boots, Malbaša briefly served as manager of FC Liège in 2000.

== Honours ==
RFC Liège

- Belgian Cup: 1989–90
