= Borče Sredojević =

Serbian footballer (born 1958)

Personal information
- Date of birth: 1 February 1958 (age 68)
- Place of birth: Bosanska Gradiška, FPR Yugoslavia
- Position: Defender

Senior career*
Years	Team	Apps	(Gls)
1974–1977	Sloga Gornji Podgradci		
1977–1979	Kozara Gradiška		
1980–1984	Borac Banja Luka	91	(4)
1984–1987	Rijeka	105	(0)
1987–1989	Partizan	35	(0)
1989–1990	Deportivo La Coruña	31	(2)
1990–1991	Kozara Gradiška		

Managerial career
- 1993–1995: Kozara Gradiška
- 1995–1996: Mladost Apatin
- 2000–2001: Tabor Sežana
- 2001–2002: Domžale
- 2002–2003: Primorje
- 2003: Borac Banja Luka
- 2003–2004: Kozara Gradiška
- 2004–2005: Zagorje
- 2007–2014: Bosnia and Herzegovina (assistant)
- 2009–2010: Leotar
- 2012: Leotar
- 2016: Borac Banja Luka
- 2017: Kozara Gradiška
- * Club domestic league appearances and goals

Borče Sredojević (Serbian Cyrillic: Борче Средојевић; born 1 February 1958) is a Serbian football manager and former player.

== Playing career ==
Born in Bosanska Gradiška, SR Bosnia and Herzegovina, to a Bosnian Serb family, he started playing with FK Kozara Gradiška but his playing career highlights were during his spells in the Yugoslav First League with OFK Beograd, FK Borac Banja Luka, NK Rijeka and FK Partizan, before moving to Spain to play in La Liga with Deportivo de La Coruña.

== Managerial career ==
Sredojević started his coaching career in 1993 and went to manage several clubs in Bosnia, Serbia and Slovenia. Notably he was assistant-coach of four Bosnia national team coaches, between 2007 and 2014, enjoying full confidence as a tactician and analyst. Notably, Sredojević assisted Fuad Muzurović (2007), Meho Kodro (2008), Miroslav Blažević (2008–2009) and Safet Sušić (2010–2014). The greatest success for Sredojević came in 2014, when he reached historical first FIFA World Cup 2014 with his Bosnia and Herzegovina national football team while assisting to Safet Sušić who served as team's manager. Meanwhile, he also led Premier League of Bosnia and Herzegovina club FK Leotar as the head coach.

He was appointed manager of Borac Banja Luka in March 2016 but could not save the club from relegation and his last job was as a manager of FK Kozara Gradiška in the First League of the Republika Srpska, which ended on 26 September 2017.
