= Vlado Kotur =

Bosnian-Herzegovinian footballer and coach

Personal information
- Date of birth: 28 November 1958 (age 67)
- Place of birth: Bosanska Dubica, FPR Yugoslavia
- Position: Midfielder

Senior career*
Years	Team	Apps	(Gls)
1977–1983	Borac Banja Luka	119	(7)
1983–1988	NK Rijeka	119	(3)
1988–1991	Borac Bosanska Dubica		

International career
1979	Yugoslavia U21		
- * Club domestic league appearances and goals

Vlado Kotur (born 28 November 1958) is a former Bosnian-Herzegovinian footballer and current coach.

== Playing career ==
As a player, Kotur played for Borac Banja Luka and NK Rijeka.
