= List of HNK Rijeka seasons =

This is a list of all seasons played by HNK Rijeka in domestic and European football, from 1946 to the most recent completed season.

This list details the club's achievements in all major competitions, and the top scorers for each season (note that only goals scored in league matches are taken into account). Players in bold were also top league scorers that season.

The tables below provide a summary of the club's performance by season in all official competitions, including domestic leagues, cups and European club competitions.

The main source of data is a book by Marinko Lazzarich that documents the history of HNK Rijeka.

== Key ==
League

- P = Games played
- W = Games won
- D = Games drawn
- L = Games lost
- GF = Goals for
- GA = Goals against
- Pts = Points
- Pos = Final position
- ↑ = Promoted
- ↓ = Relegated
- N/A = Not available or applicable

Champions	Runners-up	Third place

Cup/Europe

- PR = Preliminary round
- PO = Play-off round
- QR = Qualifying round
- R1 = Round 1
- R2 = Round 2
- R3 = Round 3
- GS = Group stage
- R16 = Round of 16
- QF = Quarter-finals
- SF = Semi-finals
- RU = Runners-up
- W = Winners

== SFR Yugoslavia (1946–1991) ==
Season	League									Cup	European competitions		Top goalscorer(s)	
Season	Div.	P	W	D	L	GF	GA	Pts	Pos	Cup	European competitions		Player(s)	Goals
1946–47	1. Div	26	7	7	12	27	42	21	9th↓	—N/a			Alcide Flaibani	4
1947–48	2. Div	20	4	2	14	27	54	10	10th↓	R3			Đura Horvatinović	7
1948–49	3. Div	18	8	1	9	32	33	17	6th↑	R3			Đura Horvatinović	8
1950	2. Div	20	8	5	7	39	31	21	7th	R2			**Stojan Osojnak**	21
1951	2. Div	30	13	4	13	68	57	30	10th	R2			Stojan Osojnak	19
1952	2. Div	18	15	1	2	70	11	31	**1st**	—N/a			Zvonko Canjuga	15
1952–53	2. Div	18	8	4	6	30	28	20	5th↓	QF			Milorad Drakulić	6
1953–54	3. Div	20	9	2	9	39	29	20	6th	—N/a			Vinizio Zidarić	11
1954–55	3. Div	22	11	5	6	29	19	27	2nd↑	R2			Bruno Veselica	8
1955–56	2. Div	22	10	2	10	37	35	22	6th	—N/a			Bruno Veselica	14
1956–57	2. Div	22	13	3	6	57	34	29	3rd	—N/a			Bruno Veselica	16
1957–58	2. Div	26	20	2	4	74	18	42	**1st**↑	—N/a			**Velimir Naumović**	17
1958–59	1. Div	22	8	4	10	29	44	20	8th	SF			Ivan Medle, Velimir Naumović	9
1959–60	1. Div	22	7	4	11	30	52	18	8th	R1			Vladimir Lukarić	8
1960–61	1. Div	22	10	2	10	32	36	22	7th	R1			Bruno Veselica	9
1961–62	1. Div	22	5	12	5	17	21	22	8th	R2			Vincenzo Zadel	4
1962–63	1. Div	26	10	3	13	28	41	23	10th	R1	Intertoto Cup	QF	Vincenzo Zadel	10
1963–64	1. Div	26	7	10	9	37	42	24	9th	R2			Bruno Veselica	12
1964–65	1. Div	28	14	6	8	47	30	34	4th	R2			Tonči Gulin	16
1965–66	1. Div	30	14	5	11	46	40	33	4th	QF	Intertoto Cup	GS	Nedeljko Vukoje	11
1966–67	1. Div	30	9	9	12	37	39	27	11th	R2			Boško Bursać	10
1967–68	1. Div	30	8	7	15	37	48	23	16th	R2			Boško Bursać	11
1968–69	1. Div	34	9	5	20	31	52	23	17th↓	QF			Boško Bursać	10
1969–70	2. Div	30	24	5	1	74	11	53	**1st**	—N/a			Boško Bursać	17
1970–71	2. Div	30	22	4	4	68	16	48	**1st**	QF			Boško Bursać	21
1971–72	2. Div	34	20	8	6	55	21	48	**1st**	R2			Josip Mohorović	11
1972–73	2. Div	34	21	4	9	54	31	46	4th	—N/a			Željko Mijač	8
1973–74	2. Div	34	18	11	5	44	21	47	**1st**↑	—N/a			Sergio Machin	7
1974–75	1. Div	34	9	12	13	33	43	30	14th	—N/a	Mitropa Cup	GS	Josip Mohorović, Josip Skoblar	6
1975–76	1. Div	34	9	13	12	35	37	31	11th	R1			Damir Desnica, Josip Skoblar	5
1976–77	1. Div	34	13	10	11	43	29	36	5th	R2			Miodrag Kustudić	17
1977–78	1. Div	34	12	13	9	47	42	37	5th	**W**	Intertoto Cup	GS	Miodrag Kustudić	17
1978–79	1. Div	34	10	11	13	35	34	31	10th	**W**	UEFA Cup Winners' Cup	R2	Damir Desnica	7
1978–79	1. Div	34	10	11	13	35	34	31	10th	**W**	Balkans Cup	**W**	Damir Desnica	7
1979–80	1. Div	34	12	9	13	34	47	33	10th	R1	UEFA Cup Winners' Cup	QF	Milan Radović	10
1979–80	1. Div	34	12	9	13	34	47	33	10th	R1	Balkans Cup	RU	Milan Radović	10
1980–81	1. Div	34	12	10	12	50	47	34	7th	R1			**Milan Radović**	26
1981–82	1. Div	34	11	10	13	39	54	32	12th	R2			Edmond Tomić	10
1982–83	1. Div	34	10	10	14	51	52	30	15th	SF			Damir Desnica	11
1983–84	1. Div	34	16	10	8	53	37	42	4th	QF			Damir Desnica	11
1984–85	1. Div	34	12	10	12	49	48	34	8th	R2	UEFA Cup	R2	Adriano Fegic	11
1985–86	1. Div	34	12	13	9	42	31	37	5th	R2	Mitropa Cup	3rd	Nebojša Malbaša	12
1986–87	1. Div	34	14	10	10	44	42	38	4th	RU	UEFA Cup	R1	Janko Janković	19
1987–88	1. Div	34	9	14	11	33	39	32	8th	R1			Janko Janković, Zoran Škerjanc	9
1988–89	1. Div	34	14	7(0)	13	35	34	28	10th	R1			Mladen Mladenović	13
1989–90	1. Div	34	14	6(5)	14	29	35	33	6th	R2			Zoran Vujčić	9
1990–91	1. Div	36	13	10(3)	13	33	25	29	15th	QF			Fabijan Komljenović	9

Source: Yugoslav Football Statistics

== Croatia (1992–present) ==
Season	League									Cup	UEFA competitions		Top goalscorer(s)		Home attendance (1. HNL only)	
Season	Division	P	W	D	L	GF	GA	Pts	Pos	Cup	UEFA competitions		Player(s)	Goals	Total	Average
1992	1. HNL	22	10	5	7	26	22	25	6th	SF			Zoran Škerjanc, Dean Ljubančić	6	18,300	1,664
1992–93	1. HNL	30	14	11	5	41	24	39	4th	R2			Zoran Ban, Elvis Scoria	8	33,300	2,220
1993–94	1. HNL	34	11	17	6	40	27	39	6th	RU			Mladen Mladenović	20	26,300	1,547
1994–95	1. HNL	30	8	10	12	22	32	34	11th	QF			Davor Dželalija	7	21,800	1,453
1995–96	1. HNL	36	11	8	17	46	56	41	9th	QF			Senad Brkić	15	42,300	2,350
1996–97	1. HNL	30	13	7	10	44	32	46	4th	R2			Admir Hasančić	10	50,000	3,333
1997–98	1. HNL	32	9	14	9	36	37	41	7th	R2			Admir Hasančić	11	41,900	2,619
1998–99	1. HNL	32	22	4	6	53	33	70	2nd	R2			Igor Musa, Barnabás Sztipánovics	14	136,000	8,500
1999–00	1. HNL	33	14	7	12	54	39	49	4th	QF	Champions League	QR2	Boško Balaban	16	51,700	3,041
2000–01	1. HNL	32	9	6	17	30	44	33	10th	R1	UEFA Cup	R1	Ante Milicic	10	30,400	1,900
2001–02	1. HNL	30	15	6	9	46	37	51	5th	QF			Natko Rački	13	39,300	2,620
2002–03	1. HNL	32	9	6	17	40	41	33	9th	R1	Intertoto Cup	R1	Sandro Klić	12	44,200	2,763
2003–04	1. HNL	32	11	9	12	36	41	42	3rd	SF			Sandro Klić	11	45,000	2,813
2004–05	1. HNL	32	11	14	7	52	40	47	4th	**W**	UEFA Cup	QR2	**Tomislav Erceg**	17	61,000	3,813
2005–06	1. HNL	32	20	5	7	61	36	65	2nd	**W**	UEFA Cup	QR2	Davor Vugrinec	15	68,000	4,250
2006–07	1. HNL	33	12	6	15	51	53	42	7th	SF	UEFA Cup	QR1	Ahmad Sharbini	21	32,300	2,019
2007–08	1. HNL	33	14	11	8	53	41	53	4th	R2			Radomir Đalović	18	52,800	3,106
2008–09	1. HNL	33	17	5	11	50	44	56	3rd	QF	Intertoto Cup	R1	Anas Sharbini	14	41,300	2,429
2009–10	1. HNL	30	10	10	10	49	44	40	9th	R2	Europa League	QR3	Radomir Đalović	10	31,300	2,087
2010–11	1. HNL	30	9	12	9	29	35	39	9th	QF			Hrvoje Štrok	6	36,200	2,413
2011–12	1. HNL	30	9	11	10	29	29	38	12th	QF			Damir Kreilach	9	34,300	2,450
2012–13	1. HNL	33	15	8	10	46	42	53	3rd	R1			**Leon Benko**	18	69,500	4,088
2013–14	1. HNL	36	21	10	5	72	35	73	2nd	**W**	Europa League	GS	Leon Benko, Andrej Kramarić	16	99,000	5,500
2014–15	1. HNL	36	22	9	5	76	29	75	2nd	SF	Europa League	GS	**Andrej Kramarić**	21	94,400	5,244
2015–16	1. HNL	36	21	14	1	56	20	77	2nd	SF	Europa League	QR2	Roman Bezjak	13	75,885	4,216
2016–17	1. HNL	36	27	7	2	71	23	88	**1st**	**W**	Europa League	QR3	Franko Andrijašević	16	85,628	4,757
2017–18	1. HNL	36	22	4	10	75	32	70	2nd	SF	Champions League	PO	Héber Araujo dos Santos	16	87,301	4,850
2017–18	1. HNL	36	22	4	10	75	32	70	2nd	SF	Europa League	GS	Héber Araujo dos Santos	16	87,301	4,850
2018–19	1. HNL	36	19	10	7	70	36	67	2nd	**W**	Europa League	QR3	Jakov Puljić	16	81,463	4,526
2019–20	1. HNL	36	19	7	10	58	42	64	3rd	**W**	Europa League	PO	**Antonio Čolak**	20	73,598	4,329
2020–21	1. HNL	36	18	7	11	51	46	61	3rd	SF	Europa League	GS	Franko Andrijašević	13	0	0
2021–22	1. HNL	36	20	5	11	71	51	65	4th	RU	Conference League	PO	Josip Drmić	21	64,576	3,798
2022–23	HNL	36	14	7	15	44	44	49	4th	R2	Conference League	QR2	Matija Frigan	14	88,046	4,891
2023–24	HNL	36	23	5	8	69	30	74	2nd	RU	Conference League	PO	Niko Janković	11	115,310	6,406
2024–25	HNL	36	18	11	7	49	21	65	**1st**	**W**	Europa League	QR3	Toni Fruk	11	96,741	5,374
2024–25	HNL	36	18	11	7	49	21	65	**1st**	**W**	Conference League	PO	Toni Fruk	11	96,741	5,374
2025–26	HNL	36	14	11	11	49	36	53	4th	RU	Champions League	QR2	Toni Fruk	12	96,874	5,382
2025–26	HNL	36	14	11	11	49	36	53	4th	RU	Europa League	PO	Toni Fruk	12	96,874	5,382
2025–26	HNL	36	14	11	11	49	36	53	4th	RU	Conference League	R16	Toni Fruk	12	96,874	5,382

Source: Croatian Football Statistics

== Honours ==
- Croatian First League: 2
  - Winners: 2016–17, 2024–25
  - Runners-up: 1998–99, 2005–06, 2013–14, 2014–15, 2015–16, 2017–18, 2018–19, 2023–24
- Yugoslav First League
  - Best placed Croatian club: 1964–65, 1983–84, 1986–87
- Croatian Cup: 7
  - Winners: 2004–05, 2005–06, 2013–14, 2016–17, 2018–19, 2019–20, 2024–25
  - Runners-up: 1993–94, 2021–22, 2023–24, 2025–26
- Yugoslav Cup: 2
  - Winners: 1977–78, 1978–79
  - Runners-up: 1986–87
- Croatian Super Cup: 1
  - Winners: 2014
  - Runners-up: 2005, 2006, 2019
- UEFA Cup Winners' Cup
  - Quarter-final: 1979–80
- Balkans Cup: 1
  - Winners: 1977–78
  - Runners-up: 1979–80
