= Rijeka city derby =

Rijeka City Derby
- Other names: Riječki gradski derbi
- Location: Rijeka, Croatia
- Teams: HNK Orijent; HNK Rijeka
- First meeting: 12 March 1952
- Latest meeting: 9 October 2017

Statistics
- Total meetings: 16 (official)
- Most wins: Rijeka (15)

Rijeka city derby (Croatian: Riječki gradski derbi), is the name given to matches between HNK Rijeka and HNK Orijent, the two most popular football clubs in the Adriatic city of Rijeka.

The rivalry dates back to the time when the western part of the city, Fiume, was part of the Kingdom of Italy and the eastern part of the city, Sušak, part of the Kingdom of Yugoslavia. Between 1932 and 1940, U.S. Fiumana and NK Orijent played 10 games, with Fiumana winning nine times and Orijent on one occasion.

Numerous derbies were contested after World War II, particularly when both clubs competed in the Yugoslav Second League between 1969 and 1973. The last league derby took place during the 1996–97 Croatian First Football League season, the only season in which Orijent played in the same tier as Rijeka since 1972–73.

== List of matches ==
The two clubs have played 14 official league matches and close to 10 official cup fixtures. In addition, they have played more than 70 friendly matches. Out of 14 league meetings, Rijeka won 11 and Orijent won 1 match, with 2 draws. The list below documents those games for which data can be found, which includes all league games and some cup games. The list will be updated as more data is sourced.

=== Key ===
Match ended in a draw
Orijent win
Rijeka win

=== Matches ===
M	Date	Competition	Ground	Score	Rijeka scorers	Orijent scorers	Attendance	Report
1	12 Mar 1952	2. Div	Cellini	3–0	Osojnak (2), Mrvoš			
2	4 May 1952	2. Div	Krimeja	1–4	Lokošek (3), Chinchella	Ljubačev		
3	8 Dec 1957	2. Div	Krimeja	0–2	Medle, Naumović			
4	18 May 1958	2. Div	Kantrida	8–0	Radaković (3), ?			
5	30 Nov 1969	2. Div	Kantrida	3–0	Bursać, Živadinović			
6	14 Jun 1970	2. Div	Krimeja	0–1	Poldrugovac			
7	2 Dec 1970	2. Div	Krimeja	0–2	?			
8	6 Jun 1971	2. Div	Kantrida	2–1	?	?		
9	5 Feb 1971	2. Div	Krimeja	0–0				
10	11 Jun 1972	2. Div	Kantrida	4–1	?	?		
11	10 Sep 1972	2. Div	Kantrida	1–2	?	Škrtić, Brnelić		
12	1 Apr 1973	2. Div	Krimeja	0–2	Machin, Cukon			
13	2 Aug 1989	Cup	Krimeja	0–1	Beširević			
14	25 Aug 1996	1. HNL	Krimeja	2–2	Ostojić, Biškup (o.g.)	Filipović, Škopljanac	6,000	HRnogomet.com
15	9 Mar 1997	1. HNL	Kantrida	4–0	Brkić (2), Anić, Hasančić		6,000	HRnogomet.com
16	1 Oct 1997	Cup	Kantrida	0–2		Deluka, Smolić	1,500	HRnogomet.com
17	18 Feb 2009	Friendly match	Krimeja	4–1	Budicin	Bajramović, Weitzer (2), Barišić	500	RijekaDanas.com
18	18 Aug 2009	Friendly match	Krimeja	2–2	Bajramović, Matko	?	?	RijekaDanas.com
19	9 Feb 2013	Friendly match	Kantrida	3–0	Benko (2), Jogan		300	Mojarijeka.hr
20	25 Aug 2015	Friendly match	Rujevica	9–1	Vizinger (2), Sharbini, Bezjak, Močinić, Roshi, Tomečak (2), Bradarić	Omerović	2,000	Nk-rijeka.hr
21	9 Oct 2017	Friendly match	Krimeja	0–2	Jelić, Črnic		2,000	Fiuman.hr

Source: Marinko Lazzarich, Kantrida Bijelih Snova, Rijeka: Adamić, 2008.
