= 1976–77 NK Rijeka season =

Rijeka
1976–77 season
- Chairman: Ljubo Španjol
- Manager: Dragutin Spasojević
- First League: 5th
- Cup: Round 2
- Top goalscorer: League: Miodrag Kustudić (17); All: Miodrag Kustudić (17)
- Average home league attendance: 6,088

The 1976–77 season was the 31st season in Rijeka's history and their 15th season in the Yugoslav First League. Their 11th place finish in the 1975–76 season meant it was their third successive season playing in the Yugoslav First League.

== Competitions ==
Competition	First match	Last match	Starting round	Final position	Record							
Competition	First match	Last match	Starting round	Final position	G	W	D	L	GF	GA	GD	Win %
Yugoslav First League	20 August 1976	19 June 1977	Matchday 1	5th	34	13	10	11	43	29	+14	38.24
Yugoslav Cup	13 October 1976	1 December 1976	First round	Second round	2	1	0	1	1	1	+0	50.00
Total					36	14	10	12	44	30	+14	38.89

=== Yugoslav First League ===
==== Classification ====
Pos	Team	Pld	W	D	L	GF	GA	GD	Pts	Qualification or relegation
3	Sloboda Tuzla	34	14	11	9	43	32	+11	39	Qualification for UEFA Cup first round
4	Partizan	34	14	11	9	37	31	+6	39	
5	Rijeka	34	13	10	11	43	29	+14	36	Qualification for Balkans Cup and Qualification for Intertoto Cup
6	Borac Banja Luka	34	14	8	12	53	43	+10	36	
7	Radnički Niš	34	13	8	13	40	43	−3	34	

Source: rsssf.org
Rules for classification: 1) points; 2) goal difference; 3) number of goals scored.

==== Results summary ====
Overall								Home						Away					
Pld	W	D	L	GF	GA	GD	Pts	W	D	L	GF	GA	GD	W	D	L	GF	GA	GD
34	13	10	11	43	29	+14	49	12	5	0	34	8	+26	1	5	11	9	21	−12

==== Results by round ====
Round	1	2	3	4	5	6	7	8	9	10	11	12	13	14	15	16	17	18	19	20	21	22	23	24	25	26	27	28	29	30	31	32	33	34
Ground	H	A	H	A	H	A	H	A	H	A	H	H	A	H	A	H	A	A	H	A	H	A	H	A	H	A	H	A	A	H	A	H	A	H
Result	D	L	D	D	W	L	D	L	W	D	W	W	L	W	L	D	D	D	W	L	W	L	W	L	W	L	D	L	L	W	W	W	D	W
Position	10	18	15	14	9	13	13	13	12	11	10	6	9	7	8	9	10	10	7	10	9	9	8	9	8	11	11	11	12	9	8	6	6	5

Source: Competitive matches
A = Away; H = Home; W = Win; D = Draw; L = Loss

== Matches ==
=== First League ===
Round	Date	Venue	Opponent	Score	Rijeka Scorers
1	20 Aug	H	Olimpija	0 – 0	
2	29 Aug	A	Budućnost	0 – 2	
3	1 Sep	H	Radnički Niš	1 – 1	Kustudić
4	5 Sep	A	Željezničar	1 – 1	Ružić
5	12 Sep	H	Čelik	3 – 0	Cukrov, Durkalić, Kustudić
6	19 Sep	A	Dinamo Zagreb	0 – 1	
7	3 Oct	H	Red Star	1 – 1	Kustudić
8	17 Oct	A	Sloboda	1 – 2	Kustudić
9	24 Oct	H	Vojvodina	2 – 0	Kustudić (2)
10	27 Oct	A	Hajduk Split	0 – 0	
11	31 Oct	H	Napredak Kruševac	1 – 0	Durkalić
12	6 Nov	H	Sarajevo	5 – 1	o.g., Radović (2), Kustudić, Cukrov
13	13 Nov	A	Borac Banja Luka	0 – 1	
14	17 Nov	H	Velež	2 – 1	Radović (2)
15	21 Nov	A	Zagreb	0 – 4	
16	28 Nov	H	Partizan	1 – 1	Ružić
17	4 Dec	A	OFK Beograd	1 – 1	Radović
18	6 Mar	A	Olimpija	0 – 0	
19	13 Mar	H	Budućnost	1 – 0	Radin
20	20 Mar	A	Radnički Niš	0 – 1	
21	27 Mar	H	Željezničar	3 – 1	Kustudić (3)
22	3 Apr	A	Čelik	1 – 2	Šaran
23	10 Apr	H	Dinamo Zagreb	1 – 0	Kustudić
24	17 Apr	A	Red Star	0 – 2	
25	21 Apr	H	Sloboda	2 – 0	Radović, Kustudić
26	24 Apr	A	Vojvodina	0 – 1	
27	15 May	H	Hajduk Split	1 – 1	Kustudić
28	18 May	A	Napredak Kruševac	0 – 1	
29	22 May	A	Sarajevo	0 – 1	
30	29 May	H	Borac Banja Luka	6 – 1	Mijač, Kustudić, Radović (2), Durkalić (2)
31	5 Jun	A	Velež	4 – 0	o.g., Hrstić, Mijač, Durkalić
32	8 Jun	H	Zagreb	2 – 0	Durkalić, Kustudić
33	11 Jun	A	Partizan	1 – 1	Kustudić
34	19 Jun	H	OFK Beograd	2 – 0	Kustudić, Cukrov

Source: rsssf.com

=== Yugoslav Cup ===
Round	Date	Venue	Opponent	Score	Rijeka Scorers
R1	13 Oct	H	Napredak Kruševac	1 – 0	Filipović
R2	1 Dec	A	Novi Sad	0 – 1	

Source: rsssf.com

=== Squad statistics ===
Competitive matches only.

Name	Apps	Goals	Apps	Goals	Apps	Goals
Name	League		Cup		Total	
(Socialist Federal Republic of Yugoslavia) Radojko Avramović	34	0	2	0	36	0
(Socialist Federal Republic of Yugoslavia) Sergio Machin	9	0	0	0	9	0
(Socialist Federal Republic of Yugoslavia) Nikica Cukrov	32	4	2	0	34	4
(Socialist Federal Republic of Yugoslavia) Savo Filipović	31	0	2	1	33	1
(Socialist Federal Republic of Yugoslavia) Zvjezdan Radin	34	1	2	0	36	1
(Socialist Federal Republic of Yugoslavia) Radomir Stefanović	16	0	2	0	18	0
(Socialist Federal Republic of Yugoslavia) Milan Ružić	29	2	2	0	31	2
(Socialist Federal Republic of Yugoslavia) Miodrag Kustudić	29	17	1	0	30	17
(Socialist Federal Republic of Yugoslavia) Josip Mohorović	17	0	2	0	19	0
(Socialist Federal Republic of Yugoslavia) Srećko Juričić	34	0	2	0	36	0
(Socialist Federal Republic of Yugoslavia) Josip Skoblar	1	0	0	0	1	0
(Socialist Federal Republic of Yugoslavia) Milan Radović	28	8	2	0	30	8
(Socialist Federal Republic of Yugoslavia) Damir Desnica	9	0	0	0	9	0
(Socialist Federal Republic of Yugoslavia) Miroslav Uljan	8	0	0	0	8	0
(Socialist Federal Republic of Yugoslavia) Dragan Stojanović	5	0	0	0	5	0
(Socialist Federal Republic of Yugoslavia) Salih Durkalić	29	6	2	0	31	6
(Socialist Federal Republic of Yugoslavia) Tihomir Silić	1	0	0	0	1	0
(Socialist Federal Republic of Yugoslavia) Ivica Car	5	0	0	0	5	0
(Socialist Federal Republic of Yugoslavia) Edin Jasprica	3	0	1	0	4	0
(Socialist Federal Republic of Yugoslavia) Murat Šaran	22	1	1	0	23	1
(Socialist Federal Republic of Yugoslavia) Željko Mijač	23	2	0	0	23	2
(Socialist Federal Republic of Yugoslavia) Miroslav Šugar	16	0	0	0	16	0
(Socialist Federal Republic of Yugoslavia) Miloš Hrstić	19	1	0	0	19	1

== See also ==
- 1976–77 Yugoslav First League
- 1976–77 Yugoslav Cup

== External sources ==
- 1976–77 Yugoslav First League at rsssf.com
- Prvenstvo 1976.-77. at nk-rijeka.hr
