= 1974–75 NK Rijeka season =

Rijeka
1974–75 season
- Chairman: Ljubo Španjol
- Manager: Gojko Zec
- First League: 14th
- Top goalscorer: League: Josip Mohorović, Josip Skoblar (6); All: Josip Mohorović, Josip Skoblar (6)
- Highest home attendance: 23,000 vs (Socialist Federal Republic of Yugoslavia) Hajduk Split (29 June 1975 - Yugoslav First League)
- Lowest home attendance: 6,000 vs (Socialist Federal Republic of Yugoslavia) Bor and vs (Socialist Federal Republic of Yugoslavia) Čelik (22 September 1974 and 24 November 1974 - Yugoslav First League)
- Average home league attendance: 10,941

The 1974–75 season was the 29th season in Rijeka's history and their 13th season in the Yugoslav First League. Their 1st place finish in the 1973–74 season meant it was their first season playing in the Yugoslav First League since they were relegated in 1968–69.

== Competitions ==
=== Overall ===
Competition	Started round	Final result	First match	Last Match
1974–75 Yugoslav First League	First round	14th	18 August 1974	29 June 1975

=== Yugoslav First League ===
==== Classification ====
Pos	Team	Pld	W	D	L	GF	GA	GD	Pts
12	Olimpija	34	7	17	10	37	48	−11	31
13	Sarajevo	34	8	14	12	38	40	−2	30
14	Rijeka	34	9	12	13	33	43	−10	30
15	Radnički Kragujevac	34	9	12	13	27	39	−12	30
16	Vardar	34	7	15	12	35	41	−6	29

Source: rsssf.org
Rules for classification: 1) points; 2) goal difference; 3) number of goals scored.

==== Results summary ====
Overall								Home						Away					
Pld	W	D	L	GF	GA	GD	Pts	W	D	L	GF	GA	GD	W	D	L	GF	GA	GD
34	9	12	13	33	43	−10	39	9	7	1	25	12	+13	0	5	12	8	31	−23

==== Results by round ====
Round	1	2	3	4	5	6	7	8	9	10	11	12	13	14	15	16	17	18	19	20	21	22	23	24	25	26	27	28	29	30	31	32	33	34
Ground	H	A	H	A	H	A	H	H	A	H	A	H	A	H	A	H	A	A	H	A	H	A	H	A	A	H	A	H	A	H	A	H	A	H
Result	D	L	D	D	D	L	W	W	L	D	L	D	L	W	L	W	L	D	W	D	D	L	D	D	L	W	L	W	L	W	L	W	D	L
Position	8	14	14	10	12	14	12	9	12	12	16	13	14	13	15	12	13	13	11	12	13	15	15	15	15	13	15	13	14	13	14	13	13	14

Source: Competitive matches
A = Away; H = Home; W = Win; D = Draw; L = Loss

== Matches ==
=== First League ===
Round	Date	Venue	Opponent	Score	Attendance	Rijeka Scorers
1	18 Aug	H	Proleter Zrenjanin	2 – 2	9,000	Čohar, Uljan
2	25 Aug	A	Sloboda	0 – 1	4,000	
3	28 Aug	H	Sarajevo	1 – 1	8,000	Kustudić
4	1 Sep	A	Vardar	1 – 1	5,000	Devčić
5	7 Sep	H	Red Star	1 – 1	12,000	Kustudić
6	15 Sep	A	Olimpija	0 – 3	10,000	
7	22 Sep	H	Bor	1 – 0	6,000	Mohorović
8	6 Oct	H	Vojvodina	1 – 0	10,000	Mohorović
9	9 Oct	A	Radnički Kragujevac	0 – 1	7,000	
10	13 Oct	H	Dinamo Zagreb	1 – 1	15,000	Čohar
11	20 Oct	A	Željezničar	0 – 2	3,000	
12	27 Oct	H	Velež	1 – 1	11,000	Devčić
13	3 Nov	A	Radnički Niš	1 – 4	6,000	Čohar
14	10 Nov	H	Partizan	1 – 0	12,000	Ražić
15	16 Nov	A	OFK Beograd	0 – 2	2,000	
16	24 Nov	H	Čelik	4 – 0	6,000	Mohorović, Ražić, Durkalić (2)
17	8 Dec	A	Hajduk Split	0 – 1	18,000	
18	2 Mar	A	Proleter Zrenjanin	1 – 1	10,000	Ražić
19	9 Mar	H	Sloboda	1 – 0	14,000	Ćerić
20	16 Mar	A	Sarajevo	1 – 1	5,000	Ćerić
21	23 Mar	H	Vardar	0 – 0	12,000	
22	29 Mar	A	Red Star	0 – 4	7,000	
23	6 Apr	H	Olimpija	1 – 1	8,000	Skoblar
24	20 Apr	A	Bor	0 – 0	4,000	
25	27 Apr	A	Vojvodina	0 – 1	10,000	
26	30 Apr	H	Radnički Kragujevac	2 – 1	9,000	Mohorović, Ćerić
27	4 May	A	Dinamo Zagreb	0 – 2	12,000	
28	11 May	H	Željezničar	4 – 0	10,000	Mohorović, Ćerić, Skoblar, Machin
29	18 May	A	Velež	2 – 4	6,000	Skoblar (2)
30	21 May	H	Radnički Niš	1 – 0	10,000	Skoblar
31	25 May	A	Partizan	0 – 1	15,000	
32	15 Jun	H	OFK Beograd	2 – 0	12,000	Ražić, Čohar
33	22 Jun	A	Čelik	2 – 2	4,000	Ražić, Mohorović
34	29 Jun	H	Hajduk Split	1 – 4	23,000	Skoblar

Source: rsssf.com

=== Squad statistics ===
Competitive matches only.

Name	Apps	Goals
(Socialist Federal Republic of Yugoslavia) Ante Bobić	2	0
(Socialist Federal Republic of Yugoslavia) Mladen Mustać	8	0
(Socialist Federal Republic of Yugoslavia) Ivan Kocjančić	33	0
(Socialist Federal Republic of Yugoslavia) Duško Devčić	33	2
(Socialist Federal Republic of Yugoslavia) Zvjezdan Radin	16	0
(Socialist Federal Republic of Yugoslavia) Mladen Cukon	25	0
(Socialist Federal Republic of Yugoslavia) Josip Ražić	31	5
(Socialist Federal Republic of Yugoslavia) Vlado Čohar	29	4
(Socialist Federal Republic of Yugoslavia) Miodrag Kustudić	10	2
(Socialist Federal Republic of Yugoslavia) Josip Mohorović	28	6
(Socialist Federal Republic of Yugoslavia) Miroslav Uljan	25	1
(Socialist Federal Republic of Yugoslavia) Sergio Machin	25	1
(Socialist Federal Republic of Yugoslavia) Borut Škulj	28	0
(Socialist Federal Republic of Yugoslavia) Srećko Juričić	30	0
(Socialist Federal Republic of Yugoslavia) Šime Miočić	5	0
(Socialist Federal Republic of Yugoslavia) Goran Kovačić	20	0
(Socialist Federal Republic of Yugoslavia) Radomir Stefanović	28	0
(Socialist Federal Republic of Yugoslavia) Salih Durkalić	12	2
(Socialist Federal Republic of Yugoslavia) Milan Trošelj	1	0
(Socialist Federal Republic of Yugoslavia) Damir Desnica	3	0
(Socialist Federal Republic of Yugoslavia) Josip Skoblar	14	6
(Socialist Federal Republic of Yugoslavia) Savo Filipović	14	0
(Socialist Federal Republic of Yugoslavia) Gano Ćerić	8	4
(Socialist Federal Republic of Yugoslavia) Radojko Avramović	5	0

== See also ==
- 1974–75 Yugoslav First League

== External sources ==
- 1974–75 Yugoslav First League at rsssf.com
- Prvenstvo 1974.-75. at nk-rijeka.hr
