= 1977–78 NK Rijeka season =

Rijeka
1977–78 season
- Chairman: Ljubo Španjol, Zvonko Poščić
- Manager: Dragutin Spasojević
- First League: 5th
- Cup: Winners
- Top goalscorer: League: Miodrag Kustudić (17); All: Miodrag Kustudić (20)
- Highest home attendance: 13,000 vs (Socialist Federal Republic of Yugoslavia) Hajduk Split (16 October 1977 - Yugoslav First League)
- Lowest home attendance: 2,000 vs (Socialist Federal Republic of Yugoslavia) Čelik (9 October 1977 - Yugoslav First League)
- Average home league attendance: 5,676

The 1977–78 season was the 32nd season in Rijeka’s history and their 16th season in the Yugoslav First League. Their 5th place finish in the 1976–77 season meant it was their fourth successive season playing in the Yugoslav First League.

== Competitions ==
Competition	First match	Last match	Starting round	Final position	Record							
Competition	First match	Last match	Starting round	Final position	G	W	D	L	GF	GA	GD	Win %
Yugoslav First League	14 August 1977	28 May 1978	Matchday 1	5th	34	12	13	9	47	42	+5	35.29
Yugoslav Cup	7 September 1977	24 May 1978	First round	Winner	5	5	0	0	7	1	+6	100.00
Total					39	17	13	9	54	43	+11	43.59

=== Yugoslav First League ===
==== Classification ====
Pos	Team	Pld	W	D	L	GF	GA	GD	Pts	Qualification or relegation
3	Hajduk Split	34	14	11	9	49	37	+12	39	Qualification for UEFA Cup first round
4	Dinamo Zagreb	34	12	13	9	54	49	+5	37	
5	Rijeka	34	12	13	9	47	42	+5	37	Qualification for Cup Winners' Cup first round
6	Sloboda Tuzla	34	15	5	14	47	46	+1	35	
7	Velež	34	13	9	12	42	43	−1	35	

Source: rsssf.org
Rules for classification: 1) points; 2) goal difference; 3) number of goals scored.

==== Results summary ====
Overall								Home						Away					
Pld	W	D	L	GF	GA	GD	Pts	W	D	L	GF	GA	GD	W	D	L	GF	GA	GD
34	12	13	9	47	42	+5	49	10	5	2	31	14	+17	2	8	7	16	28	−12

==== Results by round ====
Round	1	2	3	4	5	6	7	8	9	10	11	12	13	14	15	16	17	18	19	20	21	22	23	24	25	26	27	28	29	30	31	32	33	34
Ground	H	A	H	A	H	A	H	H	A	H	A	H	A	H	A	H	A	A	H	A	H	A	H	A	A	H	A	H	A	H	A	H	A	H
Result	L	D	W	L	D	D	W	D	L	W	D	W	D	W	L	W	D	D	D	L	D	L	W	W	L	W	D	D	D	W	L	L	W	W
Position	13	15	10	14	11	14	13	11	12	9	10	7	8	7	8	7	7	5	6	7	7	8	7	6	7	6	5	5	5	4	5	5	5	5

Source: Competitive matches
A = Away; H = Home; W = Win; D = Draw; L = Loss

== Matches ==
=== First League ===
Round	Date	Venue	Opponent	Score	Attendance	Rijeka Scorers
1	14 Aug	H	Osijek	1 – 2	10,000	Durkalić
2	21 Aug	A	Sarajevo	0 – 0	8,000	
3	28 Aug	H	Olimpija	1 – 0	5,000	Kustudić
4	31 Aug	A	Zagreb	1 – 2	6,500	Šaran
5	4 Sep	H	Partizan	1 – 1	10,000	Desnica
7	18 Sep	H	Radnički Niš	1 – 0	3,000	Kustudić
8	22 Sep	H	Sloboda	0 – 0	3,000	
9	25 Sep	A	Velež	1 – 4	3,000	o.g.
10	9 Oct	H	Čelik	2 – 1	2,000	Radović, Kustudić
11	12 Oct	A	Budućnost	1 – 1	12,000	Cukrov
12	16 Oct	H	Hajduk Split	2 – 0	13,000	Kustudić, Hrstić
13	23 Oct	A	Dinamo Zagreb	2 – 2	15,000	Desnica, Mijač
14	30 Oct	H	OFK Beograd	3 – 1	4,000	Radović, Desnica, Kustudić
15	5 Nov	A	Red Star	0 – 4	5,000	
16	20 Nov	H	Trepča	3 – 0	3,000	Kustudić (2), Desnica
17	4 Dec	A	Vojvodina	0 – 0	2,000	
18	11 Dec	A	Osijek	1 – 1	4,000	Radović
19	5 Mar	H	Sarajevo	2 – 2	9,000	Kustudić (2)
20	12 Mar	A	Olimpija	0 – 1	5,000	
21	19 Mar	H	Zagreb	3 – 3	3,500	Durkalić, Kustudić (2)
22	25 Mar	A	Partizan	1 – 3	15,000	Radović
23	2 Apr	H	Borac Banja Luka	2 – 0	5,000	Kustudić (2)
24	9 Apr	A	Radnički Niš	1 – 0	3,000	Radović
25	12 Apr	A	Sloboda	0 – 2	4,000	
26	16 Apr	H	Velež	2 – 0	4,000	Kustudić, Radović
6	19 Apr	A	Borac Banja Luka	0 – 0	6,000	
27	23 Apr	A	Čelik	2 – 2	7,000	Radović, Durkalić
28	26 Apr	H	Budućnost	1 – 1	2,500	Radović
29	30 Apr	A	Hajduk Split	2 – 2	7,000	Radin, Radović
30	6 May	H	Dinamo Zagreb	4 – 0	4,500	Durkalić (2), Kustudić (2)
31	11 May	A	OFK Beograd	2 – 3	3,000	Durkalić, Radović
32	14 May	H	Red Star	0 – 1	10,000	
33	20 May	A	Trepča	2 – 1	3,000	Fegic, Radović
34	28 May	H	Vojvodina	3 – 2	5,000	Radović, Kustudić, Durkalić

Source: rsssf.com

=== Yugoslav Cup ===
Round	Date	Venue	Opponent	Score	Rijeka Scorers
R1	7 Sep	H	Partizan	1 – 0	Kustudić
R2	26 Oct	A	Dinamo Vinkovci	1 – 0	Radović
QF	26 Feb	A	Hajduk Split	1 – 0	Kustudić (p)
SF	29 Mar	H	Velež	3 – 1	Kustudić, Desnica (p), Ružić
F	24 May	N	Trepča	1 – 0 (a.e.t.)	Radović

Source: rsssf.com

=== Squad statistics ===
Competitive matches only.

Name	Apps	Goals	Apps	Goals	Apps	Goals
Name	League		Cup		Total	
(Socialist Federal Republic of Yugoslavia) Radojko Avramović	31+0	0	5+0	0	36	0
(Socialist Federal Republic of Yugoslavia) Sergio Machin	16+3	0	3+1	0	23	0
(Socialist Federal Republic of Yugoslavia) Nikica Cukrov	31+0	1	4+0	0	35	1
(Socialist Federal Republic of Yugoslavia) Savo Filipović	17+0	0	2+0	0	19	0
(Socialist Federal Republic of Yugoslavia) Zvjezdan Radin	31+0	1	5+0	0	36	1
(Socialist Federal Republic of Yugoslavia) Miloš Hrstić	32+0	1	4+1	0	37	1
(Socialist Federal Republic of Yugoslavia) Milan Ružić	27+2	0	4+0	1	33	1
(Socialist Federal Republic of Yugoslavia) Miodrag Kustudić	25+2	17	5+0	3	32	20
(Socialist Federal Republic of Yugoslavia) Srećko Juričić	33+0	0	5+0	0	38	0
(Socialist Federal Republic of Yugoslavia) Milan Radović	30+0	12	5+0	2	35	14
(Socialist Federal Republic of Yugoslavia) Damir Desnica	28+3	4	5+0	1	36	5
(Socialist Federal Republic of Yugoslavia) Salih Durkalić	23+9	7	5+0	0	37	7
(Socialist Federal Republic of Yugoslavia) Ivica Car	9+7	0	1+2	0	19	0
(Socialist Federal Republic of Yugoslavia) Murat Šaran	4+3	1	0+0	0	7	1
(Socialist Federal Republic of Yugoslavia) Željko Mijač	9+3	1	0+0	0	12	1
(Socialist Federal Republic of Yugoslavia) Miroslav Šugar	1+3	0	0+1	0	5	0
(Socialist Federal Republic of Yugoslavia) Zoran Šestan	9+6	0	1+1	0	17	0
(Socialist Federal Republic of Yugoslavia) Radoslav Barišić	5+5	0	0+0	0	10	0
(Socialist Federal Republic of Yugoslavia) Mladen Bilibajkić	5+8	0	0+1	0	14	0
(Socialist Federal Republic of Yugoslavia) Mauro Ravnić	3+0	0	0+0	0	3	0
(Austria) Angelo Devescovi	1+2	0	0+0	0	3	0
(Socialist Federal Republic of Yugoslavia) Davor Radmanović	0+1	0	0+0	0	1	0
(Socialist Federal Republic of Yugoslavia) Danko Peranić	2+1	0	1+0	0	4	0
(Socialist Federal Republic of Yugoslavia) Adriano Fegic	1+1	1	0+0	0	2	1

== See also ==
- 1977–78 Yugoslav First League
- 1977–78 Yugoslav Cup

== External sources ==
- 1977–78 Yugoslav First League at rsssf.com
- Prvenstvo 1977.-78. at nk-rijeka.hr
