= 1975–76 NK Rijeka season =

Rijeka
1975–76 season
- Chairman: Ljubo Španjol
- Manager: Gojko Zec
- First League: 11th
- Cup: Round 1
- Top goalscorer: League: Damir Desnica, Josip Skoblar (5); All: Damir Desnica, Josip Skoblar (5)
- Highest home attendance: 20,000 vs (Socialist Federal Republic of Yugoslavia) Red Star and vs (Socialist Federal Republic of Yugoslavia) Hajduk Split (17 August 1975 and 16 October 1975 - Yugoslav First League)
- Lowest home attendance: 4,000 vs (Socialist Federal Republic of Yugoslavia) Radnički Niš and vs (Socialist Federal Republic of Yugoslavia) Radnički Kragujevac (2 December 1975 and 24 March 1976 - Yugoslav First League)
- Average home league attendance: 9,176

The 1975–76 season was the 30th season in Rijeka’s history and their 14th season in the Yugoslav First League. Their 14th place finish in the 1974–75 season meant it was their second successive season playing in the Yugoslav First League.

== Competitions ==
Competition	First match	Last match	Starting round	Final position	Record							
Competition	First match	Last match	Starting round	Final position	G	W	D	L	GF	GA	GD	Win %
Yugoslav First League	17 August 1975	11 July 1976	Matchday 1	11th	34	9	13	12	35	37	−2	26.47
Yugoslav Cup	14 August 1975	14 August 1975	First round	First round	1	0	0	1	1	3	−2	0.00
Total					35	9	13	13	36	40	−4	25.71

=== Yugoslav First League ===
==== Classification ====
Pos	Team	Pld	W	D	L	GF	GA	GD	Pts
9	Velež	34	10	12	12	39	37	+2	32
10	Borac Banja Luka	34	9	14	11	34	40	−6	32
11	Rijeka	34	9	13	12	35	37	−2	31
12	Željezničar	34	11	9	14	40	47	−7	31
13	Čelik	34	10	10	14	29	35	−6	30

Source: rsssf.org
Rules for classification: 1) points; 2) goal difference; 3) number of goals scored.

==== Results summary ====
Overall								Home						Away					
Pld	W	D	L	GF	GA	GD	Pts	W	D	L	GF	GA	GD	W	D	L	GF	GA	GD
34	9	13	12	35	37	−2	40	6	8	3	19	9	+10	3	5	9	16	28	−12

==== Results by round ====
Round	1	2	3	4	5	6	7	8	9	10	11	12	13	14	15	16	17	18	19	20	21	22	23	24	25	26	27	28	29	30	31	32	33	34
Ground	H	A	H	A	H	A	H	A	H	A	H	A	H	A	H	H	A	A	H	A	H	A	H	A	H	A	H	A	H	A	H	A	A	H
Result	L	L	D	L	W	W	W	L	D	D	D	L	W	L	D	W	L	L	D	D	D	L	L	L	W	W	D	W	W	D	D	D	D	L
Position	15	17	16	17	16	11	9	13	12	12	13	13	11	13	11	11	11	12	12	11	13	14	16	16	14	13	13	12	9	10	11	9	8	11

Source: Competitive matches
A = Away; H = Home; W = Win; D = Draw; L = Loss

== Matches ==
=== First League ===
Round	Date	Venue	Opponent	Score	Attendance	Rijeka Scorers
1	17 Aug	H	Red Star	0 – 1	20,000	
2	24 Aug	A	Partizan	0 – 2	10,000	
3	27 Aug	H	Borac Banja Luka	0 – 0	12,000	
4	31 Aug	A	Radnički Kragujevac	1 – 3	7,000	Skoblar
5	7 Sep	H	Čelik	2 – 0	10,000	Machin, Vujković
6	13 Sep	A	Hajduk Split	3 – 1	20,000	Skoblar (2), Machin
7	20 Sep	H	Sloboda	2 – 1	10,000	Silić (2)
8	28 Sep	A	Sarajevo	0 – 1	8,000	
9	5 Oct	H	OFK Beograd	0 – 0	8,000	
10	8 Oct	A	Vojvodina	1 – 1	5,000	Desnica
11	19 Oct	H	Velež	0 – 0	12,000	
12	26 Oct	A	Budućnost	0 – 2	10,000	
13	2 Nov	H	Olimpija	1 – 0	8,000	Desnica
14	9 Nov	A	Dinamo Zagreb	0 – 3	10,000	
15	23 Nov	H	Vardar	0 – 0	7,000	
16	2 Dec	H	Radnički Niš	3 – 0	4,000	Mohorović, Ćerić, Skoblar
17	7 Dec	A	Željezničar	3 – 5	1,500	Skoblar, Juričić, Desnica
18	7 Mar	A	Red Star	1 – 2	10,000	Kustudić
19	14 Mar	H	Partizan	0 – 0	12,000	
20	21 Mar	A	Borac Banja Luka	1 – 1	8,000	Vujković
21	24 Mar	H	Radnički Kragujevac	1 – 1	4,000	o.g.
22	28 Mar	A	Čelik	0 – 3	6,000	
23	4 Apr	H	Hajduk Split	1 – 2	20,000	Ćerić
24	11 Apr	A	Sloboda	0 – 1	3,000	
25	2 May	H	Sarajevo	2 – 0	5,000	Radin, Kustudić
26	5 May	A	OFK Beograd	1 – 0	7,000	Juričić
27	9 May	H	Vojvodina	0 – 0	5,000	
28	30 May	A	Velež	1 – 0	4,000	Desnica
29	2 Jun	H	Budućnost	5 – 0	5,000	Devčić (2), Durkalić, Filipović, Desnica
30	6 Jun	A	Olimpija	1 – 1	6,000	Durkalić
31	26 Jun	H	Dinamo Zagreb	0 – 0	8,000	
32	30 Jun	A	Vardar	1 – 1	10,000	Filipović
33	4 Jul	A	Radnički Niš	2 – 2	7,000	Mohorović, Durkalić
34	11 Jul	H	Željezničar	2 – 3	8,000	Stefanović, Ražić

Source: rsssf.com

=== Yugoslav Cup ===
Round	Date	Venue	Opponent	Score	Attendance	Rijeka Scorers
R1	3 Sep	A	Red Star	1 – 3	20,000	Machin

Source: rsssf.com

=== Squad statistics ===
Competitive matches only.

Name	Apps	Goals	Apps	Goals	Apps	Goals
Name	League		Cup		Total	
(Socialist Federal Republic of Yugoslavia) Radojko Avramović	16+0	0	1+0	0	17	0
(Socialist Federal Republic of Yugoslavia) Ivan Kocjančić	15+0	0	1+0	0	16	0
(Socialist Federal Republic of Yugoslavia) Sergio Machin	12+0	2	1+0	1	13	3
(Socialist Federal Republic of Yugoslavia) Nikica Cukrov	25+3	0	0+0	0	28	0
(Socialist Federal Republic of Yugoslavia) Duško Devčić	29+0	2	0+0	0	29	2
(Socialist Federal Republic of Yugoslavia) Savo Filipović	12+6	2	1+0	0	19	2
(Socialist Federal Republic of Yugoslavia) Zvjezdan Radin	34+0	1	1+0	0	35	1
(Socialist Federal Republic of Yugoslavia) Radomir Stefanović	15+3	1	0+0	0	18	1
(Socialist Federal Republic of Yugoslavia) Josip Ražić	14+8	1	0+0	0	22	1
(Socialist Federal Republic of Yugoslavia) Vlado Čohar	13+4	0	0+0	0	17	0
(Socialist Federal Republic of Yugoslavia) Miodrag Kustudić	5+2	2	0+0	0	7	2
(Socialist Federal Republic of Yugoslavia) Josip Mohorović	24+4	2	0+0	0	28	2
(Socialist Federal Republic of Yugoslavia) Srećko Juričić	28+4	2	1+0	0	33	2
(Socialist Federal Republic of Yugoslavia) Josip Skoblar	21+0	5	1+0	0	22	5
(Socialist Federal Republic of Yugoslavia) Dragan Vujković	14+4	2	1+0	0	19	2
(Socialist Federal Republic of Yugoslavia) Damir Desnica	17+6	5	0+0	0	23	5
(Socialist Federal Republic of Yugoslavia) Miroslav Uljan	0+8	0	0+0	0	8	0
(Socialist Federal Republic of Yugoslavia) Dragan Stojanović	26+0	0	1+0	0	27	0
(Socialist Federal Republic of Yugoslavia) Salih Durkalić	15+1	3	1+0	0	17	3
(Socialist Federal Republic of Yugoslavia) Tihomir Silić	15+5	2	1+0	0	21	2
(Socialist Federal Republic of Yugoslavia) Gano Ćerić	3+2	2	0+0	0	5	2
(Socialist Federal Republic of Yugoslavia) Borut Škulj	18+0	0	0+0	0	18	0
(Socialist Federal Republic of Yugoslavia) Predrag Stilinović	0+2	0	0+0	0	2	0
(Socialist Federal Republic of Yugoslavia) Šime Miočić	0+1	0	0+0	0	1	0
(Socialist Federal Republic of Yugoslavia) Miroslav Šugar	3+0	0	0+0	0	3	0
(Socialist Federal Republic of Yugoslavia) Miloš Hrstić	0+1	0	0+0	0	1	0

== See also ==
- 1975–76 Yugoslav First League
- 1975–76 Yugoslav Cup

== External sources ==
- 1975–76 Yugoslav First League at rsssf.com
- Prvenstvo 1975.-76. at nk-rijeka.hr
