= Petar Radaković =

Croatian footballer

Personal information
- Date of birth: 22 February 1937
- Place of birth: Fiume, Kingdom of Italy
- Date of death: 1 November 1966 (aged 29)
- Place of death: Rijeka, SR Croatia, SFR Yugoslavia
- Position: Midfielder

Youth career
- 1952–1954: Kvarner

Senior career*
Years	Team	Apps	(Gls)
1954–1966	Rijeka	208	(30)

International career
1960–1961	Yugoslavia B	2	(0)
1961–1964	Yugoslavia	19	(3)
- * Club domestic league appearances and goals

Petar Radaković (22 February 1937 – 1 November 1966) was a Yugoslav football player. He had 19 caps for Yugoslavia. He is famous for scoring the winning goal in the 1962 World Cup quarter-final win against Germany (1–0).

He spent his whole career playing for NK Rijeka and is considered a legend at the club.

He died from a heart attack during training, age 29.

== Club career ==
Radaković started playing football in his hometown club NK Rijeka, then called NK Kvarner, in 1952. Radaković made his first appearance for the senior team on 13 August 1954 in a Cup match against NK Lokomotiva in which he scored a goal with the match ending 5–1.

During his first five seasons, Rijeka gained promotion from Third to First League. In 1959, he played in Rijeka's first semi-final match. They lost 2–0 to Red Star Belgrade. In the 1960-61 season, Radaković was named the best player of NK Rijeka and the best right winger in Yugoslavia. He was also named the best right winger in Yugoslavia in 1962 and 1963.

Even though he had offers from many Belgrade clubs who were dominating the First League at the time he stayed at Rijeka.

Radaković made 408 appearances for the club scoring 68 goals. Radaković was Rijeka's first national team player and first player to appear in the FIFA World Cup. He holds the record for the fastest scored goal in the club's history; three seconds.

== Death ==
Radaković first started having heart problems during a ten-day tour of West Germany in the spring of 1963. Two years later, in the spring of the 1964–65 season, by the physician's recommendations he took some time to rest. After three months, he returned to the field in the last game of the season against Red Star Belgrade. But the match was turned out to be too early for him to play after the match he had to undergo intensive treatment, examinations and therapies. The first match in 1966–67 season against Željezničar at Kantrida, marked his return. His first two matches of the season went by without an incident but on the third, against Hajduk, his heart could not endure and he himself asked to be substituted after only 25 minutes of the match. But he continued to train, was persistent and did not believe the doctors when they said he would no longer be able to run on the field, enjoy the atmosphere of the game, hear the applause from the stands.

On 1 November 1966, Radaković died of a heart attack during training. He was buried at Trsat cemetery on 2 November 1966 in front of 15,000 people.

== International career ==
From 1959 to 1961, he was called up for the Yugoslavia U-21 team and Yugoslavia B team.

He made his debut for Yugoslavia on 18 June 1961 against Morocco. He made 19 appearances and scored 3 goals. He played at the 1962 FIFA World Cup where Yugoslavia finished in fourth place His final international was a September 1964 friendly away against Austria.

=== International appearances ===
Yugoslavia national team
Year	Apps	Goals
1961	8	2
1962	8	1
1963	2	0
1964	1	0
Total	19	3

=== International goals ===
Goal	Date	Venue	Opponent	Score	Result	Competition
1	8 October 1961	JNA Stadium, Belgrade	South Korea	4 – 1	5 – 1	FIFA World Cup qualifiers
2	7 December 1961	Senayan Main Stadium, Central Jakarta	Indonesia	0 – 1	1 – 5	Friendly
3	10 June 1962	Estadio Nacional, Santiago	West Germany	1 – 0	1 – 0	1962 FIFA World Cup

== Honours ==
=== Rijeka ===
- Yugoslav Second League (1): 1957–58

=== Individual ===
- NK Rijeka player of the season: 1960–61
- Best Right winger in Yugoslavia: 1961, 1962, 1963
- Rijeka sportsperson of the year: 1962
- NK Rijeka all time XI

== Tribute ==
Since 1969 NK Rijeka has hosted a youth tournament as a tribute to the player named Memorijal Petar Radaković where four youth clubs compete every year. In 1972 NK Rijeka opened its youth academy and named it after the Youth football academy Petar Radaković.

Radaković was named in NK Rijeka's all time XI in 2008 by Marinko Lazzarich and in 2011 by Novi list.

During May 2012, Armada Rijeka, NK Rijeka's fans, created a mural near Stadion Kantrida in his honor.
