= Branko Radović =

Branko Radović may refer to:

- Branko Radović (basketball) (1933–1993), Yugoslav basketball player and coach
- Branko Radović (footballer, born 1950), Montenegrin football player and manager
