= Velimir Naumović =

Serbian footballer (1936–2011)

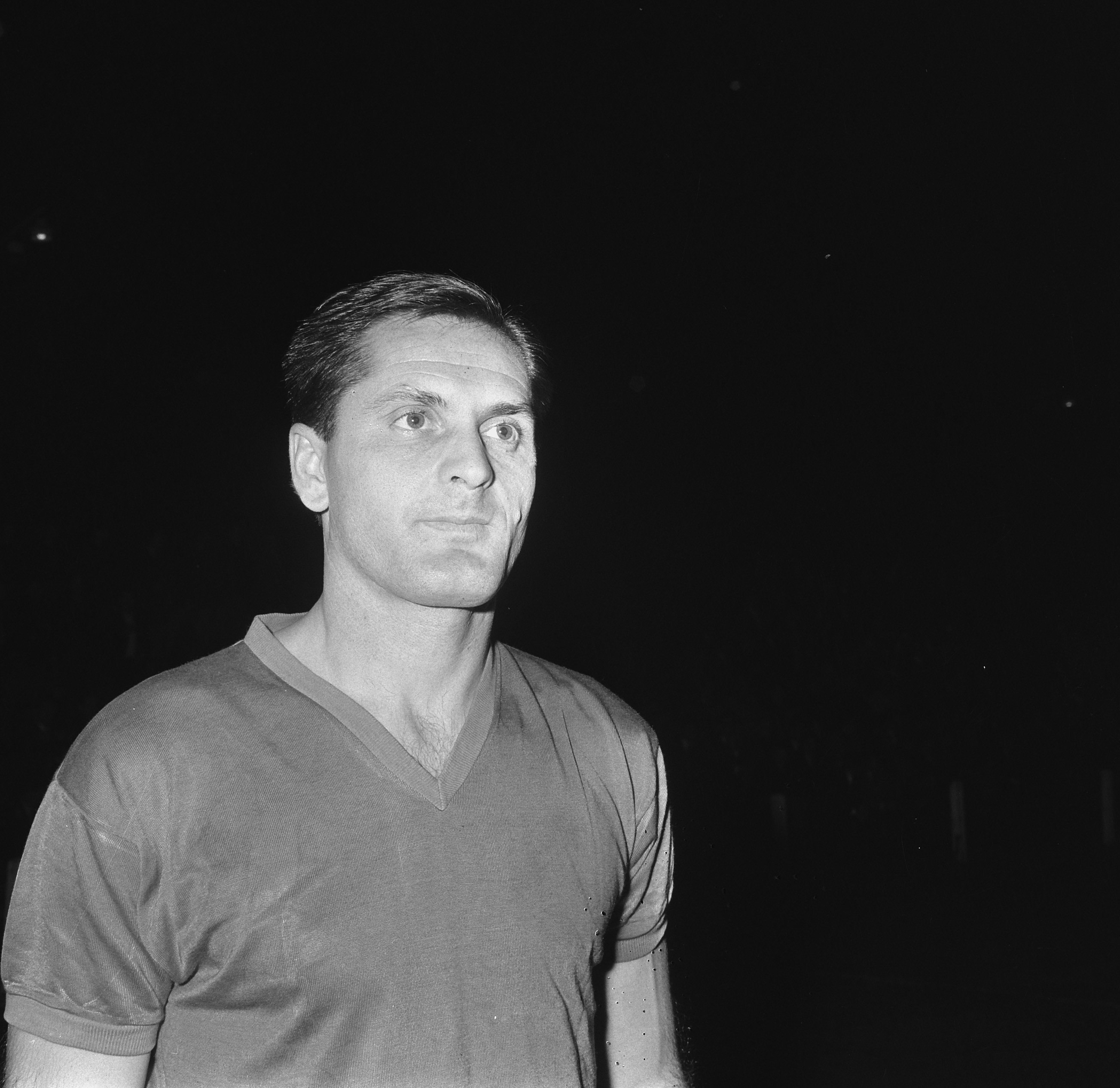
- Naumović in 1965

Personal information
- Date of birth: 19 March 1936
- Place of birth: Belgrade, Kingdom of Yugoslavia
- Date of death: 19 December 2011 (aged 75)
- Place of death: Liège, Belgium
- Height: 1.68 m (5 ft 6 in)
- Position: Striker

Youth career
- Jedinstvo Zemun
- Red Star Belgrade

Senior career*
Years	Team	Apps	(Gls)
1953–1956	Red Star Belgrade	3	(0)
1956–1965	Rijeka	204	(41)
1965–1969	Standard Liège	66	(3)
1969–1971	Rennes	49	(2)
1971–1972	Racing Jet		
1972–1976	Tilleur		

International career
1964	Yugoslavia	1	(0)
1963–1964	Yugoslavia XI	2	(0)

Managerial career
- 1976–1978: Rudar Labin
- 1978–1979: MC Alger
- 1980: MC Alger
- 1981–1983: Africa Sports
- 1986–1987: Mladost Petrinja
- 1989–1991: Orijent
- 1992–1993: Tilleur
- Union Namur
- Pazinka
- * Club domestic league appearances and goals

Velimir Naumović (Serbian Cyrillic: Велимир Наумовић; 19 March 1936 – 19 December 2011) was a Serbian footballer who played as a striker for SFR Yugoslavia. He was often called Veljko Naumović. During his managerial career, he was nicknamed The Saviour for his profound record of saving club from sticky situations.

== Playing career ==
=== Club ===
He first appeared on Kantrida, his future club's ground, in 1954 at Kvarnerska Rivijera, where Red Star beat Rijeka 3:1 in the final of the tournament. During his military service in Rijeka, he moved to the town's football club NK Rijeka. He stayed at the club for nine years and became a legend, being part of the club's first generation to play in the First League. During his time in Rijeka, he received numerous offers to return to Red Star Belgrade, but stayed loyal to Rijeka. He played a total of 400 matches and scored 155 goals in all competitions.

In 1965, he moved to Belgian Standard Liège, where he won two Cup and one League title. During his time in Belgium, he was nicknamed "Yugoslav Puskás" for his superb playing. In the 1967–68 European Cup Winners' Cup, the team got to the quarter final where they were defeated by AC Milan. After Standard Liège, he moved to the French club Stade Rennais in 1969. There, he mostly played as a midfielder. He helped the club win the 1971 Coupe de France, their second trophy in history. He finished his career playing for the low-tier Belgian clubs Racing Jet and Tilleur.

=== International ===
Naumović made his debut for Yugoslavia in an October 1963 friendly match away against Romania, coming on as a 68th-minute substitute for Slaven Zambata, and earned a total of 3 caps (no goals). His final international again was a friendly against Romania but since the Romanians played with their Olympic squad both games are unofficial.

== Managerial career ==
After his playing career, he managed NK Rudar Labin, NK Orijent, Tilleur, Africa Sports, and MC Alger.

== Career statistics ==
=== Club ===
Appearances and goals by club, season and competition
Club	Season	League			National cup (Note: Includes Yugoslav Cup, Belgian Cup, Coupe de France.)		Continental		Total	
Club	Season	Division	Apps	Goals	Apps	Goals	Apps	Goals	Apps	Goals
Red Star Belgrade	1953–54	Yugoslav First League	2	0	–		–		2	0
Red Star Belgrade	1954–55	Yugoslav First League	1	0	–		–		1	0
Red Star Belgrade	1955–56	Yugoslav First League	0	0	–		–		0	0
Red Star Belgrade	Yugoslavia		3	0	0	0	0	0	3	0
NK Rijeka	1956–57	Yugoslav Second League	23	5	–		–		23	5
NK Rijeka	1957–58	Yugoslav Second League	26	17	–		–		26	17
NK Rijeka	1958–59	Yugoslav First League	22	8	4	1	–		26	9
NK Rijeka	1959–60	Yugoslav First League	19	4	1	0	–		20	4
NK Rijeka	1960–61	Yugoslav First League	20	1	1	0	–		21	1
NK Rijeka	1961–62	Yugoslav First League	19	3	2	1	–		21	4
NK Rijeka	1962–63	Yugoslav First League	24	1	1	0	–		25	1
NK Rijeka	1963–64	Yugoslav First League	25	1	1	0	–		26	1
NK Rijeka	1964–65	Yugoslav First League	26	1	1	0	–		27	1
NK Rijeka	Yugoslavia		204	41	11	2	0	0	215	43
Standard Liège	1965–66	Belgian First Division	24	2	–		3	0	27	2
Standard Liège	1966–67	Belgian First Division	17	1	–		8	0	25	1
Standard Liège	1967–68	Belgian First Division	23	0	–		5	0	28	0
Standard Liège	1968–69	Belgian First Division	2	0	–		–		2	0
Standard Liège	Total		66	3	0	0	16	0	82	3
Rennes	1969–70	Division 1	30	2	8	0	–		38	2
Rennes	1970-71	Division 1	19	0	5	0	–		24	0
Rennes	Total		49	2	13	0	0	0	62	2
Career total			322	46	24	2	16	0	362	48

=== International ===
Velimir Naumović' matches for the Yugoslavia national team
Date	Location	Host team	Score	Away team	Competition	Goals scored
27 October 1963	Stadionul August 23, Bucharest	Romania	2–1	Yugoslavia	Friendly	0
18 March 1964	Vasil Levski National Stadium, Sofia	Bulgaria	0–1	Yugoslavia	Friendly	0
17 June 1964	JNA Stadium, Belgrade	Yugoslavia	1–2	Romania	Friendly	0
Total		Appearances	3		Goals	0

== Honours ==
Red Star Belgrade

- Yugoslav First League: 1955–56

NK Rijeka

- Yugoslav Second League: 1957–58

Standard Liège

- Belgian First Division: 1968–69
- Belgian Cup: 1966, 1967

Rennes

- Coupe de France: 1970–71

MC Alger

- Algerian Championnat National: 1978–79

Africa Sports

- Ivory Coast Ligue 1: 1982, 1983
- Coupe de Côte d'Ivoire: 1981, 1982
- Coupe Houphouët-Boigny: 1981, 1982

Individual

- Yugoslav Second League top scorer: 1957–58
- NK Rijeka all time XI by: Novi List
