= Bruno Veselica =

Croatian footballer (1936–2018)

Personal information
- Full name: Bruno Veselica
- Date of birth: 24 January 1936
- Place of birth: Albona, Kingdom of Italy
- Date of death: 20 November 2018 (aged 82)
- Place of death: Rijeka, Croatia
- Position: Forward

Youth career
- 1950-1953: Rudar Labin

Senior career*
Years	Team	Apps	(Gls)
1953–1964	Rijeka		(83)
1964–?	Olimpija Ljubljana		
- * Club domestic league appearances and goals

Bruno Veselica (24 January 1936 – 20 November 2018) was a Croatian-born Yugoslav footballer.

== Career ==
As a player, he was regarded as one of HNK Rijeka's best forwards of all time. He is the club's second-highest top scorer of all time after Boško Bursać. He was the club's top scorer for five seasons. After more than ten years spent with Rijeka, he continued his career with Olimpija Ljubljana.

== Honours ==
NK Rijeka

- Yugoslav Second League: 1957-58
