= 1976–77 Yugoslav First League =

Yugoslav First League
- Season: 1976–77
- Dates: 12 August 1976 – 19 June 1977
- Champions: Red Star (12th title)
- Relegated: Napredak Kruševac; Željezničar
- European Cup: Red Star
- Cup Winners' Cup: Hajduk Split
- UEFA Cup: Dinamo Zagreb; Sloboda
- Matches played: 272
- Goals scored: 773 (2.84 per match)
- Top goalscorer: Zoran Filipović (21)

1976–77 Yugoslav First League (Prva savezna liga Jugoslavije, Prvenstvo 1976/77) competition was the 49th top league season since 1923 in various incarnations of Yugoslavia. It was won in dominating fashion by Red Star Belgrade with a 9-point margin over the second placed team (Dinamo Zagreb), which at the time set the record as largest ever points differential by which a team triumphed in the league.

This was Red Star's 12th league title.

== Teams ==
A total of eighteen teams contested the league, including sixteen sides from the 1975–76 season and two sides promoted from the 1975–76 Yugoslav Second League (YSL) as winners of the two second level divisions East and West. The league was contested in a double round robin format, with each club playing every other club twice, for a total of 34 rounds. Two points were awarded for wins and one point for draws.

FK Vardar and FK Radnički Kragujevac were relegated from the 1975–76 Yugoslav First League after finishing the season in bottom two places of the league table. The two clubs promoted to top level were NK Zagreb and FK Napredak Kruševac.

Team	Location	Federal Republic	Position in 1975–76
Borac Banja Luka	Banja Luka	SR Bosnia and Herzegovina	10th
Budućnost	Titograd	SR Montenegro	15th
Čelik	Zenica	SR Bosnia and Herzegovina	13th
Dinamo Zagreb	Zagreb	SR Croatia	3rd
Hajduk Split	Split	SR Croatia	2nd
Napredak	Kruševac	SR Serbia	—
OFK Belgrade	Belgrade	SR Serbia	8th
Olimpija Ljubljana	Ljubljana	SR Slovenia	14th
Partizan	Belgrade	SR Serbia	1st
Radnički Niš	Niš	SR Serbia	16th
Red Star	Belgrade	SR Serbia	4th
NK Rijeka	Rijeka	SR Croatia	11th
FK Sarajevo	Sarajevo	SR Bosnia and Herzegovina	7th
Sloboda	Tuzla	SR Bosnia and Herzegovina	6th
Velež	Mostar	SR Bosnia and Herzegovina	9th
Vojvodina	Novi Sad	SR Serbia	5th
NK Zagreb	Zagreb	SR Croatia	—
Željezničar	Sarajevo	SR Bosnia and Herzegovina	12th

== League table ==
Pos	Team	Pld	W	D	L	GF	GA	GD	Pts	Qualification or relegation
1	Red Star Belgrade (C)	34	20	10	4	67	37	+30	50	Qualification for European Cup first round
2	Dinamo Zagreb	34	15	11	8	52	36	+16	41	Qualification for UEFA Cup first round
3	Sloboda Tuzla	34	14	11	9	43	32	+11	39	Qualification for UEFA Cup first round
4	Partizan	34	14	11	9	37	31	+6	39	
5	Rijeka	34	13	10	11	43	29	+14	36	Qualification for Balkans Cup and Qualification for Intertoto Cup
6	Borac Banja Luka	34	14	8	12	53	43	+10	36	
7	Radnički Niš	34	13	8	13	40	43	−3	34	
8	Hajduk Split	34	12	9	13	41	35	+6	33	Qualification for Cup Winners' Cup first round
9	Budućnost	34	11	11	12	44	47	−3	33	
10	NK Zagreb	34	12	8	14	48	48	0	32	
11	Velež	34	11	10	13	46	48	−2	32	
12	Olimpija	34	10	12	12	36	42	−6	32	
13	Čelik	34	11	9	14	33	38	−5	31	
14	Vojvodina	34	8	14	12	40	50	−10	30	Qualification for Intertoto Cup
15	OFK Belgrade	34	9	12	13	39	51	−12	30	
16	Sarajevo	34	10	10	14	40	55	−15	30	
17	Napredak Kruševac (R)	34	10	8	16	38	55	−17	28	Relegation to Yugoslav Second League
18	Željezničar (R)	34	8	10	16	33	53	−20	26	Relegation to Yugoslav Second League

Source: rsssf.org
Rules for classification: 1) points; 2) goal difference; 3) number of goals scored.
(C) Champions; (R) Relegated

== Results ==
Home \ Away	BOR	BUD	ČEL	DIN	HAJ	NAP	OFK	OLI	PAR	RNI	RSB	RIJ	SAR	SLO	VEL	VOJ	ZAG	ŽEL
Borac Banja Luka		5–0	1–0	3–1	2–0	5–1	1–1	5–0	2–0	1–0	1–4	1–0	6–2	1–0	1–1	3–1	1–1	2–1
Budućnost	0–0		3–1	0–0	0–0	4–0	1–1	1–0	2–0	3–3	2–0	2–0	1–1	2–2	3–0	4–1	4–0	1–1
Čelik	1–0	2–0		1–1	1–0	6–1	0–0	0–0	1–0	3–2	1–4	2–1	0–0	1–1	0–0	0–0	2–1	1–0
Dinamo Zagreb	5–1	6–1	2–1		2–1	2–1	1–1	3–2	0–0	2–0	0–1	1–0	0–0	1–1	2–2	2–0	2–1	3–1
Hajduk Split	1–0	4–0	1–1	3–0		3–0	3–1	0–0	0–2	1–2	1–2	0–0	1–1	4–0	2–1	2–1	1–0	4–0
Napredak Kruševac	2–1	1–0	1–1	1–2	1–1		3–0	2–2	0–1	1–0	2–2	1–0	0–1	4–0	4–1	1–3	2–0	0–0
OFK Belgrade	2–1	0–2	1–0	2–1	0–1	2–4		0–0	2–2	1–3	0–0	1–1	2–1	2–0	0–0	4–0	0–3	2–1
Olimpija	0–0	1–1	0–1	2–1	2–1	2–0	2–1		4–2	2–1	4–4	0–0	2–2	0–0	0–2	3–2	1–1	1–0
Partizan	0–0	1–0	3–1	1–0	1–0	0–0	3–2	1–0		0–0	2–1	1–1	3–0	1–1	2–0	1–1	1–0	4–0
Radnički Niš	1–2	2–0	1–0	2–2	2–2	1–2	1–1	1–0	2–0		1–0	1–0	4–2	0–1	1–0	1–1	1–3	1–0
Red Star	2–1	4–1	2–1	1–1	2–0	1–1	0–2	1–0	1–0	6–2		2–0	2–1	2–1	3–2	3–1	3–1	5–2
Rijeka	6–1	1–0	3–0	1–0	1–1	1–0	2–0	0–0	1–1	1–1	1–1		5–1	2–0	2–1	2–0	2–0	3–1
Sarajevo	2–0	0–2	1–2	2–2	3–1	1–1	2–2	2–0	0–1	1–0	0–2	1–0		1–1	1–1	2–0	3–2	5–0
Sloboda Tuzla	1–0	3–1	1–0	0–0	0–0	5–0	3–0	2–1	3–0	2–0	2–2	2–1	1–0		3–0	0–0	3–0	2–0
Velež	2–1	2–1	1–0	0–1	4–0	2–1	4–1	3–0	1–1	0–1	0–1	0–4	5–0	1–0		2–2	3–3	1–0
Vojvodina	1–1	5–2	2–0	0–2	2–1	1–0	1–1	1–3	2–1	0–0	1–1	1–0	3–0	1–1	1–1		0–0	2–2
NK Zagreb	4–3	0–0	2–1	0–2	1–0	3–0	2–1	0–2	2–0	0–1	2–2	4–0	0–1	2–0	3–3	3–2		3–0
Željezničar	0–0	0–0	2–1	3–2	0–1	1–0	2–3	1–0	1–1	3–1	0–0	1–1	3–0	2–1	3–0	1–1	1–1	

Source: DataSoccer.it
Legend: Blue = home team win; Yellow = draw; Red = away team win.

== Winning squad ==
Champions: Red Star Belgrade
Player	League	
Player	Matches	Goals
Vladislav Bogićević	34	7
Zoran Filipović	33	21
Slavoljub Muslin	32	0
Dušan Nikolić	30	2
Zoran Jelikić	27	0
Branko Radović	26	0
Dušan Savić	25	15
Boško Kajganić	25	0
Dušan Lukić	23	1
Nikola Jovanović	23	0
Miloš Šestić	22	8
Srboljub Stamenković	19	4
Mile Novković	18	1
Petar Baralić	17	1
Milan Babić	16	0
Sead Sušić	13	7
Aleksandar Stojanović (goalkeeper)	11	0
Zdravko Borovnica	10	0
Vladimir "Pižon" Petrović	10	0
Dragoslav Stepanović	7	0
Bratislav Đorđević	5	0
Milan Ćalasan	3	0
Radivoje Ratković	3	0
Dragan Simeunović (goalkeeper)	1	0
Aleksandar Panajotović	1	0
Danilo Mandić	1	0
Dušan Ajder	1	0
Dejan Stanković	1	0
Head coach: Gojko Zec

== Top scorers ==
Rank	Player	Club	Goals
1	(Socialist Federal Republic of Yugoslavia) Zoran Filipović	Red Star	21
2	(Socialist Federal Republic of Yugoslavia) Slavko Kovačić	NK Zagreb	20
3	(Socialist Federal Republic of Yugoslavia) Miodrag Kustudić	Rijeka	17
4	(Socialist Federal Republic of Yugoslavia) Mehmed Buza	Čelik	16
5	(Socialist Federal Republic of Yugoslavia) Dušan Savić	Red Star	15
6	(Socialist Federal Republic of Yugoslavia) Snješko Cerin	Dinamo Zagreb	14
6	(Socialist Federal Republic of Yugoslavia) Slaviša Žungul	Hajduk Split	14
8	(Socialist Federal Republic of Yugoslavia) Pavle Grubješić	Partizan	13
8	(Socialist Federal Republic of Yugoslavia) Abid Kovačević	Borac Banja Luka	13
8	(Socialist Federal Republic of Yugoslavia) Dušan Bajević	Velež	13

== See also ==
- 1976–77 Yugoslav Cup
- Yugoslav League Championship
- Football Association of Yugoslavia
