= Kvarnerska Rivijera =

- Founded: 1953
- Region: Rijeka, Croatia
- Teams: 16
- Current champions: (Croatia) Dinamo Zagreb (9th title)
- Most championships: (Croatia) Rijeka (20 titles)
- Website: kvarnerskarivijera.com

Kvarnerska Rivijera is one of the oldest youth football tournaments in the world, first played in 1953. The tournament is organised by HNK Rijeka, a Croatian football club, and attracts clubs from across Europe and other continents. It is held each year during the May–June period in Rijeka, Croatia, and its surroundings, including towns in the Istria County, the Primorje-Gorski Kotar County and the Lika-Senj County. The final is commonly played in Rijeka. Until 2014, the tournament has been contested by under-19 club sides, with occasional national team participation. From 2015, the tournament features under-17 club sides.

== History ==
The tournament was first played in 1953, becoming Europe's third oldest youth football tournament after Torneo di Viareggio and Bellinzona tournament. Hajduk Split were the first winners and 1860 München the first international side to compete. Each year there were 16 participants, with the exception of 1972 and 1976–80 (32 teams), and 1985 and 2002 (24 teams). Rijeka's Ivan Kocjančić and Marijan Brnčić participated in the tournament five times, making them the record holders for most appearances.

Numerous later notable footballers have played in the tournament during their youth, including Dino Zoff, Pietro Carmignani, Giovanni Galli, Gerd Müller, Paul Breitner, Joe Jordan, Terry Yorath, Pierluigi Casiraghi, Robert Prosinečki, Alen Bokšić, Zvonimir Boban and Davor Šuker.

A number of national under-19 sides have also taken part in the tournament, including Albania, Czechoslovakia, Ireland, Macedonia, United States, Tunisia, Oman, Iraq, China, Japan and South Korea.

The hosts, Rijeka, are the most successful side, winning 20 tournaments, followed by Hajduk Split with 12 titles.

== Format and participating teams (2019) ==
The 67th edition of the tournament was played from 27 May to 2 June 2019. The tournament featured 16 teams divided into 4 groups, played in Kostrena, Labin, Novi Vinodolski and Rovinj. The group fixtures were played in a single round-robin format. The top two teams in each of the four groups qualified for the first knock-out round. Two one-legged knock-out rounds were played in Mavrinci, Rovinj and Kostrena. This was followed by a one-off final and third-place play-off in Krimeja on 2 June 2019.

Croatian teams

- (Croatia) Dinamo Zagreb
- (Croatia) Orijent
- (Croatia) Osijek
- (Croatia) Pomorac 1921
- (Croatia) Rijeka
- (Croatia) Rovinj
- (Croatia) Rudar
- (Croatia) Vinodol

International teams

- Albania U19
- (Bosnia and Herzegovina) Željezničar
- (Italy) Udinese
- (Italy) Venezia
- (North Macedonia) Vardar
- (Slovakia) DAC 1904
- (Slovenia) Maribor
- (Slovenia) Olimpija

== Winners ==
=== By year ===
Note: Parentheses indicates the score after the penalty shoot-out.

Year	Winner	Runner-up	Score
1953	(Socialist Federal Republic of Yugoslavia) Hajduk Split	(Austria) Vienna	2–1
1954	(Socialist Federal Republic of Yugoslavia) Red Star Belgrade	(Socialist Federal Republic of Yugoslavia) Rijeka	3–1
1955	(Socialist Federal Republic of Yugoslavia) Red Star Belgrade	(Socialist Federal Republic of Yugoslavia) Rijeka	2–2 (8–7)
1956	(Hungary) Vasas Budapest	(Italy) Ponziana Trieste	3–2
1957	(Socialist Federal Republic of Yugoslavia) Rijeka	(Socialist Federal Republic of Yugoslavia) Budućnost Podgorica	4–1
1958	(Socialist Federal Republic of Yugoslavia) Hajduk Split	(Socialist Federal Republic of Yugoslavia) Rijeka	1–0
1959	(Socialist Federal Republic of Yugoslavia) Partizan Belgrade	(Socialist Federal Republic of Yugoslavia) Hajduk Split	1–0
1960	(Socialist Federal Republic of Yugoslavia) Rijeka	(Socialist Federal Republic of Yugoslavia) Dinamo Zagreb	1–1 (4–3)
1961	(Socialist Federal Republic of Yugoslavia) Dinamo Zagreb	(Italy) Marzotto Valdagno	3–3 (7–6)
1962	(Hungary) Vasas Budapest	(Czechoslovakia) Dukla Prague	1–0
1963	(Czechoslovakia) Dukla Prague	(Socialist Federal Republic of Yugoslavia) Rudar Labin	6–1
1964	(Socialist Federal Republic of Yugoslavia) Rijeka	(Socialist Federal Republic of Yugoslavia) Partizan Belgrade	1–0
1965	(Socialist Federal Republic of Yugoslavia) Partizan Belgrade	(Socialist Federal Republic of Yugoslavia) Dinamo Zagreb	1–0
1966	(Socialist Federal Republic of Yugoslavia) Partizan Belgrade	(Bulgaria) CSKA Sofia	1–0
1967	(Socialist Federal Republic of Yugoslavia) Dinamo Zagreb	(Czechoslovakia) Dukla Prague	3–0
1968	(Socialist Federal Republic of Yugoslavia) Rijeka	(Socialist Federal Republic of Yugoslavia) Dinamo Zagreb	2–1
1969	(Socialist Federal Republic of Yugoslavia) Red Star Belgrade	(Socialist Federal Republic of Yugoslavia) Partizan Belgrade	2–1
1970	(Soviet Union) Burevestnik Moscow	(Socialist Federal Republic of Yugoslavia) Dinamo Zagreb	2–0
1971	(England) Leeds United	(Socialist Federal Republic of Yugoslavia) Red Star Belgrade	2–1
1972	(Socialist Federal Republic of Yugoslavia) Hajduk Split	(Socialist Federal Republic of Yugoslavia) Dinamo Zagreb	6–1
1973	(Socialist Federal Republic of Yugoslavia) Rijeka	(Socialist Federal Republic of Yugoslavia) Partizan Belgrade	3–0
1974	(Socialist Federal Republic of Yugoslavia) Velež Mostar	(Socialist Federal Republic of Yugoslavia) Dinamo Zagreb	2–1
1975	(Socialist Federal Republic of Yugoslavia) Rijeka	(Italy) Fiorentina	2–0
1976	(Soviet Union) Burevestnik Moscow	(Socialist Federal Republic of Yugoslavia) Hajduk Split	1–0
1977	(Socialist Federal Republic of Yugoslavia) Dinamo Zagreb	(Socialist Federal Republic of Yugoslavia) Hajduk Split	0–0 (4–3)
1978	(Socialist Federal Republic of Yugoslavia) Red Star Belgrade	(Socialist Federal Republic of Yugoslavia) Vojvodina Novi Sad	3–3 (6–4)
1979	(Socialist Federal Republic of Yugoslavia) Hajduk Split	(Socialist Federal Republic of Yugoslavia) Rijeka	4–0
1980	(Socialist Federal Republic of Yugoslavia) Hajduk Split	(Italy) Juventus	3–2
1981	(Socialist Federal Republic of Yugoslavia) Dinamo Zagreb	(Socialist Federal Republic of Yugoslavia) Hajduk Split	2–1
1982	Japan	(Socialist Federal Republic of Yugoslavia) Istra Pula	0–0 (4–3)
1983	(England) Leeds United	(Socialist Federal Republic of Yugoslavia) Hajduk Split	1–0
1984	(Socialist Federal Republic of Yugoslavia) Dinamo Zagreb	Korea	3–1
1985	(Socialist Federal Republic of Yugoslavia) Sutjeska Nikšić	(Socialist Federal Republic of Yugoslavia) Vardar Skopje	5–2
1986	(Socialist Federal Republic of Yugoslavia) Dinamo Zagreb	(Socialist Federal Republic of Yugoslavia) Red Star Belgrade	1–0
1987	(Socialist Federal Republic of Yugoslavia) Rijeka	(Socialist Federal Republic of Yugoslavia) Istra Pula	2–0
1988	(Socialist Federal Republic of Yugoslavia) Hajduk Split	(Socialist Federal Republic of Yugoslavia) Sarajevo	1–1 (6–5)
1989	(Socialist Federal Republic of Yugoslavia) Rijeka	(Socialist Federal Republic of Yugoslavia) Istra Pula	0–0 (7–6)
1990	(Croatia) Hajduk Split	(England) Notts County	1–0
1991	(Socialist Federal Republic of Yugoslavia) Partizan Belgrade	(Croatia) Zadar	3–0
1992	(Croatia) Rijeka	(Croatia) Dinamo Zagreb	2–1
1993	(Croatia) Rijeka	(Croatia) Dinamo Zagreb	1–0
1994	(Croatia) Hajduk Split	(Croatia) Orijent Rijeka	2–0
1995	(Croatia) Orijent Rijeka	(Italy) Bari	1–0
1996	(Croatia) Rijeka	(Croatia) Dinamo Zagreb	2–1
1997	(Croatia) Hajduk Split	(Croatia) Osijek	3–0
1998	(Croatia) Hajduk Split	(Croatia) Rijeka	0–0 (5–4)
1999	(Croatia) Dinamo Zagreb	(Croatia) Osijek	1–0
2000	(Croatia) Hajduk Split	(Italy) Perugia	2–2 (3–2)
2001	(Croatia) Rijeka	(Croatia) Hajduk Split	1–0
2002	(Croatia) Varteks	(Croatia) Rijeka	3–1
2003	(Brazil) Atlético Mineiro	(Croatia) Hajduk Split	0–0 (4–3)
2004	(Brazil) Atlético Mineiro	(Croatia) Rijeka	4–2
2005	(Italy) Vicenza	(Croatia) Dinamo Zagreb	0–0 (4–2)
2006	(Croatia) Rijeka	(Bosnia and Herzegovina) Željezničar Sarajevo	1–0
2007	(Croatia) Hajduk Split	(Slovenia) Maribor	2–2 (4–3)
2008	(Croatia) Dinamo Zagreb	(Netherlands) Sparta Rotterdam	3–1
2009	(Croatia) Rijeka	(Croatia) Hajduk Split	2–1
2010	(Croatia) Rijeka	(Croatia) Istra 1961 Pula	1–0
2011	(Croatia) Rijeka	(Croatia) Slaven Belupo	3–1
2012	(Croatia) Rijeka	(Italy) Vicenza	4–1
2013	(Nigeria) Abuja Academy	(Croatia) Osijek	1–0
2014	(Croatia) Rijeka	(Italy) Verona	3–0
2015	(Nigeria) Abuja Academy	(Slovenia) Domžale	2–0
2016	(Croatia) Rijeka	(Nigeria) Abuja Academy	1–0
2017	(Croatia) Rijeka	(Montenegro) Budućnost Podgorica	0–0 (4–2)
2018	(Slovenia) Maribor	(Slovenia) Olimpija Ljubljana	2–1
2019	(Croatia) Dinamo Zagreb	(Croatia) Rijeka	1–0

=== By club ===
Club	Winners	Runners-up	Winning years
(Socialist Federal Republic of Yugoslavia) (Croatia) Rijeka	20	8	1957, 1960, 1964, 1968, 1973, 1975, 1987, 1989, 1992, 1993, 1996, 2001, 2006, 2009, 2010, 2011, 2012, 2014, 2016, 2017
(Socialist Federal Republic of Yugoslavia) (Croatia) Hajduk Split	12	8	1953, 1958, 1972, 1979, 1980, 1988, 1990, 1994, 1997, 1998, 2000, 2007
(Socialist Federal Republic of Yugoslavia) (Croatia) Dinamo Zagreb	10	10	1961, 1967, 1977, 1981, 1984, 1986, 1999, 2008, 2019, 2023
(Socialist Federal Republic of Yugoslavia) Partizan Belgrade	4	3	1959, 1965, 1966, 1991
(Socialist Federal Republic of Yugoslavia) Red Star Belgrade	4	2	1954, 1955, 1969, 1978
(Nigeria) Abuja Academy	2	1	2013, 2015
(Hungary) Vasas Budapest	2	—	1956, 1962
(Soviet Union) Burevestnik Moscow	2	—	1970, 1976
(England) Leeds United	2	—	1971, 1983
(Brazil) Atlético Mineiro	2	—	2003, 2004
(Czech Republic) Dukla Prague	1	2	1963
(Croatia) Orijent Rijeka	1	1	1995
(Italy) Vicenza	1	1	2005
(Slovenia) Maribor	1	1	2018
(Socialist Federal Republic of Yugoslavia) Velež Mostar	1	—	1974
Japan	1	—	1982
(Socialist Federal Republic of Yugoslavia) Sutjeska Nikšić	1	—	1985
(Croatia) Varteks	1	—	2002
(Croatia) Osijek	1	—	2024
(Austria) Sturm	1	—	2022
