= Milan Radović =

Serbian footballer

Personal information
- Date of birth: 15 July 1952 (age 74)
- Place of birth: Titovo Užice, FPR Yugoslavia
- Height: 1.72 m (5 ft 8 in)
- Position: Striker

Youth career
- 1970–1972: Železnik
- 1972–1974: Beograd

Senior career*
| Years | Team | Apps | (Gls) |
| 1975–1976 | Radnički Pirot | 32 | (10) |
| 1976–1981 | Rijeka | 123 | (56) |
| 1981–1984 | Brest | 53 | (13) |
| Total | | 208 | (79) |
- * Club domestic league appearances and goals

Milan Radović (Serbian Cyrillic: Милан Радовић; born 15 July 1952) is a Serbian retired footballer who played as a striker for NK Rijeka and Brest.

Born in Titovo Užice (SR Serbia, SFR Yugoslavia) he began playing with FK Radnički Pirot before moving to HNK Rijeka where he became Yugoslav First League top goalscorer in 1980–81 with 26 goals. In 1981, he moved abroad to France where he joined French Division 1 side Stade Brest, where he would play alongside compatriot and Yugoslavia national team player Drago Vabec.

== Career statistics ==
Appearances and goals by club, season and competition
| Club | Season | League | | | Cup (Note: Includes Yugoslav Cup, Coupe de France.) | | Continental | | Total | |
| Club | Season | Division | Apps | Goals | Apps | Goals | Apps | Goals | Apps | Goals |
|---|---|---|---|---|---|---|---|---|---|---|
| Radnički Pirot | 1975-76 | Yugoslav Second League | 32 | 10 | | | – | | 32 | 10 |
| NK Rijeka | 1976-77 | Yugoslav First League | 28 | 8 | 2 | 0 | – | | 30 | 8 |
| NK Rijeka | 1977-78 | Yugoslav First League | 30 | 12 | 5 | 2 | – | | 35 | 14 |
| NK Rijeka | 1978-79 | Yugoslav First League | 5 | 0 | 0 | 0 | 0 | 0 | 5 | 0 |
| NK Rijeka | 1979–80 | Yugoslav First League | 29 | 10 | 1 | 0 | 6 | 2 | 36 | 12 |
| NK Rijeka | 1980–81 | Yugoslav First League | 31 | 26 | 1 | 0 | – | | 32 | 26 |
| NK Rijeka | Total | | 123 | 56 | 9 | 2 | 6 | 2 | 138 | 60 |
| Brest | 1981–82 | French Division 1 | 31 | 9 | 2 | 1 | – | | 33 | 10 |
| Brest | 1982–83 | French Division 1 | 17 | 4 | 0 | 0 | – | | 17 | 4 |
| Brest | 1983–84 | French Division 1 | 5 | 0 | – | | – | | 5 | 0 |
| Brest | Total | | 53 | 13 | 2 | 1 | 0 | 0 | 55 | 14 |
| Career total | | | 208 | 79 | 11 | 3 | 6 | 2 | 225 | 84 |

== Honours ==
NK Rijeka

- Yugoslav Cup: 1978, 1979
- Balkans Cup: 1978

Individual

- Yugoslav First League top scorer: 1980–81
