= Duško Ajder =

Serbian footballer (born 1958)

Personal information
- Full name: Dušan Ajder
- Date of birth: 6 December 1958 (age 67)
- Place of birth: Belgrade, SFR Yugoslavia
- Position: Centre back

Senior career*
| Years | Team | Apps | (Gls) |
| 1976–1979 | Red Star Belgrade | 1 | (0) |
| 1979–1991 | Rad | 255 | (20) |
| 1991–1992 | Ankaragücü | 6 | (0) |
| 1992–1994 | Leça | 35 | (2) |
- * Club domestic league appearances and goals

Dušan "Duško" Ajder (Serbian Cyrillic: Душко Ајдер; born 6 December 1958) is a Serbian retired footballer who played as a central defender.

Born in Belgrade, SR Serbia, he played for Belgrade clubs Red Star and FK Rad in the Yugoslav First League before moving abroad, first to Turkey, to play with Ankaragücü and then to Portugal to play with Leça.
