= Branko Radović (footballer, born 1950) =

Montenegrin football manager and player

Personal information
- Full name: Branko Radović
- Date of birth: 18 October 1950 (age 76)
- Place of birth: Titograd, PR Montenegro, FPR Yugoslavia
- Height: 1.85 m (6 ft 1 in)
- Position: Defender

Youth career
- OFK Titograd

Senior career*
Years	Team	Apps	(Gls)
1969–1977	Red Star Belgrade	97	(1)
1972–1973	→ Sutjeska Nikšić (loan)	48	(0)
1978	Colorado Caribous	29	(0)
1979–1981	Atlanta Chiefs	69	(0)
1979–1981	Atlanta Chiefs (indoor)	28	(0)
1981–1982	New Jersey Rockets (indoor)	38	(1)
1982–1983	Cleveland Force (indoor)	40	(2)
Total		349	(4)

International career
1969	Yugoslavia U18	5	(1)

Managerial career
- 1995–1996: Obilić
- 1997: Mladost Lučani
- 1998: Sartid Smederevo
- 2003: Thể Công
Medal record
Gold medal – first place	Mediterranean Games	1971
- * Club domestic league appearances and goals

Branko Radović (Serbian Cyrillic: Бранко Радовић; born 18 October 1950) is a Montenegrin former football manager and player.

== Club career ==
Born in Titograd, Radović joined Red Star Belgrade as a teenager, making his Yugoslav First League debut in 1969. He later played professionally in the United States.

== International career ==
At international level, Radović was capped for the Yugoslavia national under-18 team. He also represented Yugoslavia at the 1971 Mediterranean Games, winning a gold medal.

== Managerial career ==
During the 1990s, Radović was manager of Obilić, Mladost Lučani, and Sartid Smederevo. He also served as manager of Vietnamese club Thể Công in 2003.

== Honours ==
Red Star Belgrade

- Yugoslav First League: 1969–70, 1976–77
- Yugoslav Cup: 1969–70, 1970–71

Yugoslavia

- Mediterranean Games: 1971
