= Duško Devčić =

Croatian footballer

Personal information
- Full name: Duško Devčić
- Date of birth: 16 March 1948 (age 78)
- Place of birth: Rijeka, SR Croatia, SFR Yugoslavia
- Position: Defender

Senior career*
Years	Team	Apps	(Gls)
1965–1976	Rijeka		
1976–1978	Lausanne Sports		
- * Club domestic league appearances and goals

Duško Devčić (born 16 March 1948 in Rijeka, Croatia) is a Croatian retired football player.

== Club career ==
He was one of Rijeka's most capped and best regarded defenders of all time. He had played for Rijeka for eleven seasons and had captained the club when it got promoted to the Yugoslav First League in 1974. In 1976, he moved to Switzerland where he continued his career with Lausanne Sports.
