= Sergio Machin =

Croatian footballer

Personal information
- Full name: Sergio Machin
- Date of birth: 6 July 1952 (age 74)
- Place of birth: Rijeka, PR Croatia, FPR Yugoslavia
- Position: Midfielder

Senior career*
Years	Team	Apps	(Gls)
1970–1982	Rijeka	428	(48)
1982	Zagreb	10	(0)
- * Club domestic league appearances and goals

Sergio Machin (sometimes also spelt Makin, born 6 July 1952) is a Croatian retired football player.

== Club career ==
Born in Rijeka, as a player he was part of HNK Rijeka's golden generation which won the Yugoslav Cup in 1978 and 1979. He was an all round player that could play as a defender, midfielder and forward, although he was most comfortable in the midfield. Although one of Rijeka's most talented players, he never made an appearance in the Yugoslavia national team due to biases in favour of players from the "big four" (Red Star Belgrade, Partizan Belgrade, Dinamo Zagreb and Hajduk Split). Before finishing his career, he played the second half of the 1981-82 season with another Yugoslav First League club, NK Zagreb.

== Personal life ==
Currently, Sergio Machin lives in Novigrad, Istria, where he runs a hotel.

== Honours ==
NK Rijeka

- Yugoslav Second League: 1970-71, 1971–72, 1973–74
- Yugoslav Cup: 1978, 1979
- Balkans Cup: 1978

== Club statistics ==
Season	Club	League	League		Cup		Europe		Total	
Season	Club	League	Apps	Goals	Apps	Goals	Apps	Goals	Apps	Goals
1974–75	Rijeka	Yugoslav First League	25	1	–		–		25	1
1975–76	Rijeka	Yugoslav First League	12	2	1	0	–		13	2
1976–77	Rijeka	Yugoslav First League	9	0	0	0	–		9	0
1977–78	Rijeka	Yugoslav First League	19	0	4	0	–		23	0
1978–79	Rijeka	Yugoslav First League	34	1	4	0	4	0	42	1
1979–80	Rijeka	Yugoslav First League	28	0	1	0	5	0	34	0
1980–81	Rijeka	Yugoslav First League	27	2	0	0	–		27	2
1981–82	Rijeka	Yugoslav First League	12	0	0	0	–		12	0
1981–82	Zagreb	Yugoslav First League	10	0	–		–		10	0
Rijeka total			176	6	10	0	9	0	195	6
