= Miodrag Kustudić =

Yugoslav footballer

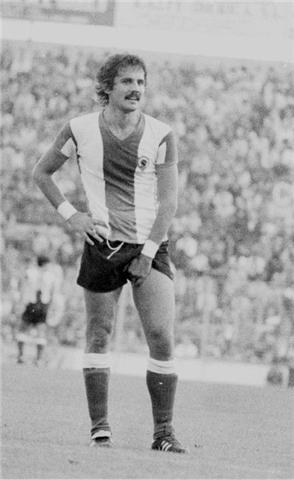
- Kustudić playing for Hércules

Personal information
- Full name: Miodrag Kustudić
- Date of birth: 1 April 1951 (age 75)
- Place of birth: Lovćenac, FPR Yugoslavia
- Height: 1.85 m (6 ft 1 in)
- Position: Striker

Senior career*
| Years | Team | Apps | (Gls) |
| 1970–1971 | Srem | | |
| 1971–1974 | Vojvodina | 77 | (26) |
| 1974–1978 | Rijeka | 73 | (38) |
| 1978–1981 | Hércules | 67 | (34) |
| 1981–1982 | Mallorca | 30 | (13) |
| 1983 | Rijeka | 3 | (1) |
| Total | | 250 | (112) |

International career
| 1977–1978 | Yugoslavia | 3 | (0) |
- * Club domestic league appearances and goals

Miodrag Kustudić (Serbian Cyrillic: Миодраг Кустудић; born 1 April 1951) is a Yugoslav retired footballer who played as a striker.

== Club career ==
After helping Srem win the Vojvodina League, Kustudić made his Yugoslav First League debut with Vojvodina in 1971. He spent three seasons at the club, before switching to Rijeka in 1974. After winning the Yugoslav Cup in 1978, Kustudić moved abroad to Spain and joined La Liga side Hércules. He also played for Mallorca, before returning to Rijeka in 1983.

== International career ==
At international level, Kustudić was capped three times for Yugoslavia, making his debut in a November 1977 World Cup qualifier loss to Spain. His final appearance came in a May 1978 friendly against Italy.

== Career statistics ==
=== Club ===
Appearances and goals by club, season and competition
| Club | Season | League | | | Cup | | Continental | | Total | |
| Club | Season | Division | Apps | Goals | Apps | Goals | Apps | Goals | Apps | Goals |
|---|---|---|---|---|---|---|---|---|---|---|
| Srem | 1970–71 | Vojvodina League | | | — | | — | | | |
| Vojvodina | 1971–72 | Yugoslav First League | 34 | 15 | | | — | | 34 | 15 |
| Vojvodina | 1972–73 | Yugoslav First League | 30 | 7 | | | 2 | 0 | 32 | 7 |
| Vojvodina | 1973–74 | Yugoslav First League | 13 | 4 | | | — | | 13 | 4 |
| Vojvodina | Total | | 77 | 26 | | | 2 | 0 | 79 | 26 |
| Rijeka | 1974–75 | Yugoslav First League | 10 | 2 | — | | | | 10 | 2 |
| Rijeka | 1975–76 | Yugoslav First League | 7 | 2 | 0 | 0 | — | | 7 | 2 |
| Rijeka | 1976–77 | Yugoslav First League | 29 | 17 | 1 | 0 | — | | 30 | 17 |
| Rijeka | 1977–78 | Yugoslav First League | 27 | 17 | 5 | 3 | | | 32 | 20 |
| Rijeka | Total | | 73 | 38 | 6 | 3 | | | 79 | 41 |
| Hércules | 1978–79 | Primera División | 24 | 12 | 2 | 2 | — | | 26 | 14 |
| Hércules | 1979–80 | Primera División | 20 | 10 | 3 | 1 | — | | 23 | 11 |
| Hércules | 1980–81 | Primera División | 23 | 12 | 3 | 2 | — | | 26 | 14 |
| Hércules | Total | | 67 | 34 | 8 | 5 | — | | 75 | 39 |
| Mallorca | 1981–82 | Segunda División | 21 | 11 | 3 | 4 | — | | 24 | 15 |
| Mallorca | 1982–83 | Segunda División | 9 | 2 | 3 | 0 | — | | 12 | 2 |
| Mallorca | Total | | 30 | 13 | 6 | 4 | — | | 36 | 17 |
| Rijeka | 1982–83 | Yugoslav First League | 3 | 1 | 1 | 0 | — | | 4 | 1 |
| Career total | | | 250 | 112 | 21 | 12 | 2 | 0 | 273 | 124 |

=== International ===
Appearances and goals by national team and year
| National team | Year | Apps | Goals |
|---|---|---|---|
| Yugoslavia | 1977 | 1 | 0 |
| Yugoslavia | 1978 | 2 | 0 |
| Total | | 3 | 0 |

== Honours ==
Srem

- Vojvodina League: 1970–71

Rijeka

- Yugoslav Cup: 1977–78
