= Murat Šaran =

Bosnian footballer (1949–2021)

Personal information
- Date of birth: 24 November 1949
- Place of birth: Sarajevo, FPR Yugoslavia
- Date of death: 3 June 2021 (aged 71)
- Place of death: Sarajevo, Bosnia and Herzegovina
- Position: Forward

Senior career*
Years	Team	Apps	(Gls)
1967–1968	Igman Ilidža		
1968–1974	Sarajevo	119	(23)
1974–1975	Bor	28	(4)
1976–1978	Rijeka	29	(2)
1978–1979	Čelik Zenica	14	(5)
1979–1981	Levante	13	(1)
- * Club domestic league appearances and goals

Murat Šaran (24 October 1949 – 3 June 2021) was a Bosnian professional footballer who played as a forward.

== Club career ==
Šaran started his career with Sarajevo-based lower-tier side Igman Ilidža before making his move to FK Sarajevo where he spent seven years and established himself as a first team regular. He went on to play for Bor, Rijeka and Čelik, before making a move to Spain where he joined Levante for two seasons before retiring in 1981.
