= Mladen Cukon =

Croatian footballer (born 1946)

Personal information
- Full name: Mladen Cukon
- Date of birth: 21 March 1946 (age 80)
- Place of birth: Pula, PR Croatia, FPR Yugoslavia
- Position: Defender

Senior career*
Years	Team	Apps	(Gls)
1968–1970	NK Orijent		
1970–1971	Dinamo Zagreb	1	(0)
1971–1975	HNK Rijeka		(10)
1976	Toronto Metros-Croatia	26	(0)
1976–1977	NK Osijek	10	(0)
1977	Toronto Metros-Croatia	21	(0)
- * Club domestic league appearances and goals

Mladen Cukon (born 21 March 1946) is a former Croatian football player.

== Club career ==
Born in Pula, as a player he spent much of his career playing in Rijeka for NK Orijent and HNK Rijeka. He also had a short and unsuccessful spell with Dinamo Zagreb playing only one game. Afterwards, he had two stints with Toronto Metros-Croatia in 1976 and 1977, also playing for NK Osijek between the two spells in Canada.
