= Boško Bursać =

Yugoslav footballer (1945–2020)

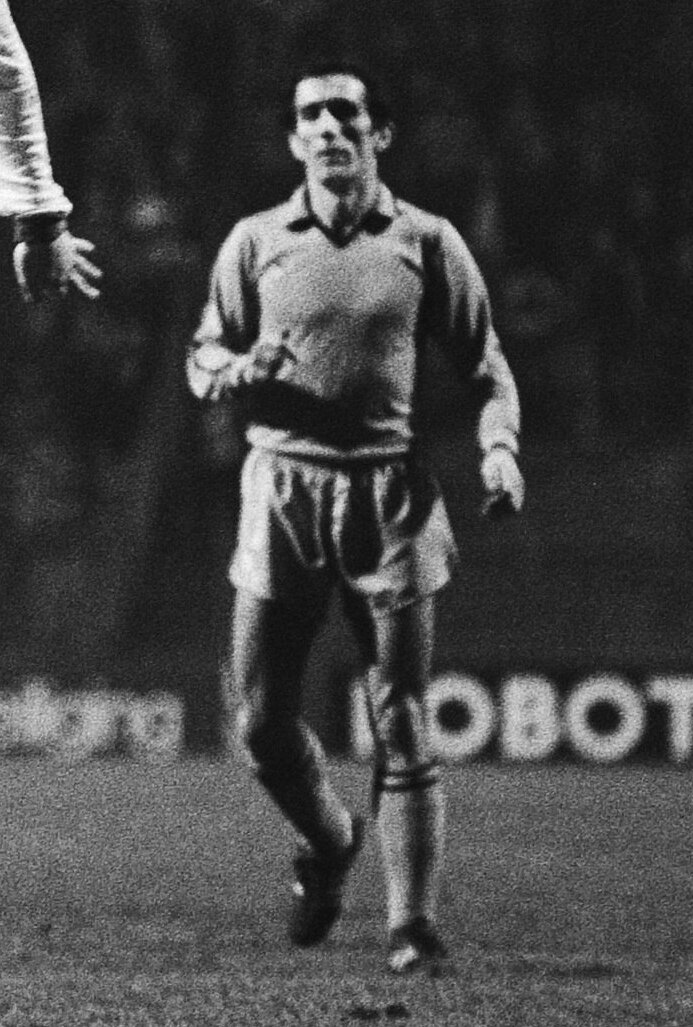
- Bursać with Vitesse in 1980

Personal information
- Full name: Boško Bursać
- Date of birth: 22 August 1945
- Place of birth: Bosansko Grahovo, DF Yugoslavia
- Date of death: 8 April 2020 (aged 74)
- Place of death: Arnhem, Netherlands
- Position: Forward

Senior career*
Years	Team	Apps	(Gls)
1963–1964	Proleter Zrenjanin	20	(11)
1964–1972	Rijeka	179	(90)
1972–1974	NK Zagreb	46	(30)
1974–1980	Vitesse Arnhem	125	(56)
Total		370	(187)
- * Club domestic league appearances and goals

Boško Bursać (Serbian Cyrillic: Бошко Бурсаћ; 22 August 1945 – 8 April 2020) was a Yugoslav professional footballer.

== Club career ==
Born in Bosansko Grahovo, SR Bosnia and Herzegovina, then part of Yugoslavia, he started his career at Serbian side FK Proleter Zrenjanin. After only one season, he moved to HNK Rijeka where he was regarded as one of the best forwards and he remains the club's top scorer of all time. He was the club's top scorer for five years. After eight seasons with Rijeka, he spent 2 seasons with NK Zagreb before he continued his career abroad in the Netherlands with Vitesse Arnhem.

== Death ==
Bursać died in Arnhem, Holland on 8 April 2020 at the age of 74.
