= 1977–78 Balkans Cup =

Tournament details
- Country: Balkans
- Teams: 6

Final positions
- Champions: (Socialist Federal Republic of Yugoslavia) Rijeka
- Runners-up: (Romania) Jiul Petroșani

Tournament statistics
- Matches played: 10
- Goals scored: 27 (2.7 per match)

The 1977–78 Balkans Cup was an edition of the Balkans Cup, a football competition for representative clubs from the Balkan states. It was contested by 6 teams and Rijeka won the trophy.

== Group Stage ==
=== Group A ===
Pos	Team	Pld	W	D	L	GF	GA	GR	Pts	Qualification
1	(Romania) Jiul Petroșani (A)	2	1	0	1	3	2	1.500	2	Advances to finals
2	(Bulgaria) Slavia Sofia	2	1	0	1	2	3	0.667	2	
3	(Turkey) Galatasaray (Note: Galatasaray withdrew from the tournament.)	0	0	0	0	0	0	—	0	

Source: rsssf.com
Rules for classification: 1) points; 2) goal average; 3) number of goals scored
(A) Advance to a further round
Notes:
3 May 1978

Slavia Sofia (Bulgaria)	2–0	(Romania) Jiul Petroșani

Slavia Stadium, Sofia

24 May 1978

Jiul Petroșani (Romania)	3–0	(Bulgaria) Slavia Sofia

Stadionul Jiul, Petroșani

=== Group B ===
Pos	Team	Pld	W	D	L	GF	GA	GR	Pts	Qualification
1	(Socialist Federal Republic of Yugoslavia) Rijeka (A)	4	3	0	1	10	2	5.000	6	Advances to finals
2	(Albania) Skënderbeu Korçë	4	2	0	2	3	8	0.375	4	
3	(Greece) Aris	4	1	0	3	3	6	0.500	2	

Source: rsssf.com
Rules for classification: 1) points; 2) goal average; 3) number of goals scored
(A) Advance to a further round
19 October 1977

Aris (Greece)	2–0	(Albania) Skënderbeu Korçë

Aris Stadium, Thessaloniki

23 November 1977

Rijeka (Socialist Federal Republic of Yugoslavia)	6–0	(Albania) Skënderbeu Korçë

Stadion Kantrida, Rijeka

21 December 1977

Skënderbeu Korçë (Albania)	1–0	(Socialist Federal Republic of Yugoslavia) Rijeka
Rragami 66'

Skënderbeu Stadium, Korçë

1 March 1978

Skënderbeu Korçë (Albania)	2–0	(Greece) Aris
Xhambazi 16'; Muhaxhiri 25'

Skënderbeu Stadium, Korçë

1978

Rijeka (Socialist Federal Republic of Yugoslavia)	2–0	(Greece) Aris

Stadion Kantrida, Rijeka

1978

Aris (Greece)	1–2	(Socialist Federal Republic of Yugoslavia) Rijeka

Aris Stadium, Thessaloniki

== Finals ==
Team 1	Agg.	Team 2	1st leg	2nd leg
Jiul Petroșani (Romania)	2–4	(Socialist Federal Republic of Yugoslavia) Rijeka	1–0	1–4

=== First leg ===
6 December 1978

Jiul Petroșani (Romania)	1–0	(Socialist Federal Republic of Yugoslavia) Rijeka
Mulțescu 52'	Report

Jiul, Petroșani
Attendance: 12,000
Referee: Chonkov (Bulgaria)

=== Second leg ===
13 December 1978

Rijeka (Socialist Federal Republic of Yugoslavia)	4–1	(Romania) Jiul Petroșani
Tomić 11', 24'; Desnica 67' (pen.), 71'	Report	Mulțescu 55'

Kantrida, Rijeka
Attendance: 2,000
Referee: Mosmopulos (Greece)

Rijeka won 4–2 on aggregate.
