= Ivan Kocjančić =

Croatian footballer

Personal information
- Full name: Ivan Kocjančić
- Date of birth: 1947 (age 78–79)
- Place of birth: Rijeka, SR Croatia, SFR Yugoslavia
- Position: Defender

Senior career*
| Years | Team | Apps | (Gls) |
| 1966–1976 | Rijeka | 480 | (2) |

Managerial career
- 1996: Rijeka (caretaker)
- * Club domestic league appearances and goals

Ivan Kocjančić (born 1947) is a Croatian-born Yugoslav retired football player.

== Playing career ==
=== Club ===
Born in Rijeka, he played for HNK Rijeka during his entire career, collecting close to 500 caps. He played as a defender and captained his club when it won promotion to the Yugoslav First League in 1974.

== Managerial career ==
Following the end of his career he remained active with Rijeka, coaching in the youth programme. He managed one of Rijeka games as an interim manager in 1996.
