= Salih Durkalić =

Croatian footballer

Personal information
- Date of birth: 24 July 1951 (age 75)
- Place of birth: FPR Yugoslavia
- Position: Striker

Senior career*
Years	Team	Apps	(Gls)
1972–1978	Rijeka	98	(18)
1978–1979	Kortrijk		
1979–1981	Sochaux	61	(10)
1981–1982	Mulhouse	23	(5)
1982–1983	Le Havre	14	(1)
1983–1984	Mulhouse	23	(8)
- * Club domestic league appearances and goals

Salih Durkalić (born 24 July 1951 in Yugoslavia) is a former Croatian football player.

== Club career ==
In his career, he played for NK Rijeka, K.V. Kortrijk, FC Sochaux-Montbéliard, FC Mulhouse and Le Havre AC.
