= Josip Mohorović =

Croatian footballer and manager

Personal information
- Full name: Josip Mohorović
- Date of birth: 22 March 1948 (age 78)
- Place of birth: Labin, SR Croatia, SFR Yugoslavia
- Position: Midfielder

Senior career*
Years	Team	Apps	(Gls)
1968–1976	Rijeka	232	(37)
1977–1979	NAC	78	(15)
1979–1981	Chiasso	36	(4)
1981–1983	Mendrisio	27	(8)

Managerial career
- 1983–1984: Mendrisio
- 1984–1985: Bellinzona
- * Club domestic league appearances and goals

Josip Mohorović (born 22 March 1948) is a Croatian retired football player and manager.

== Playing career ==
As a player, he spent much of his career (ten seasons) playing for HNK Rijeka, in process collecting over 400 caps and scoring 34 goals. He was one of the club's most important midfielders during the mid-1970s. He was also the club's top scorer during the 1971–72 and 1974–75 seasons. From Rijeka he moved to the Netherlands, where he played with NAC Breda. He finished his career in Switzerland with Mendrisio, before becoming a manager.
