= Stadion Kantrida =

Croatian football stadium

Kantrida Stadium
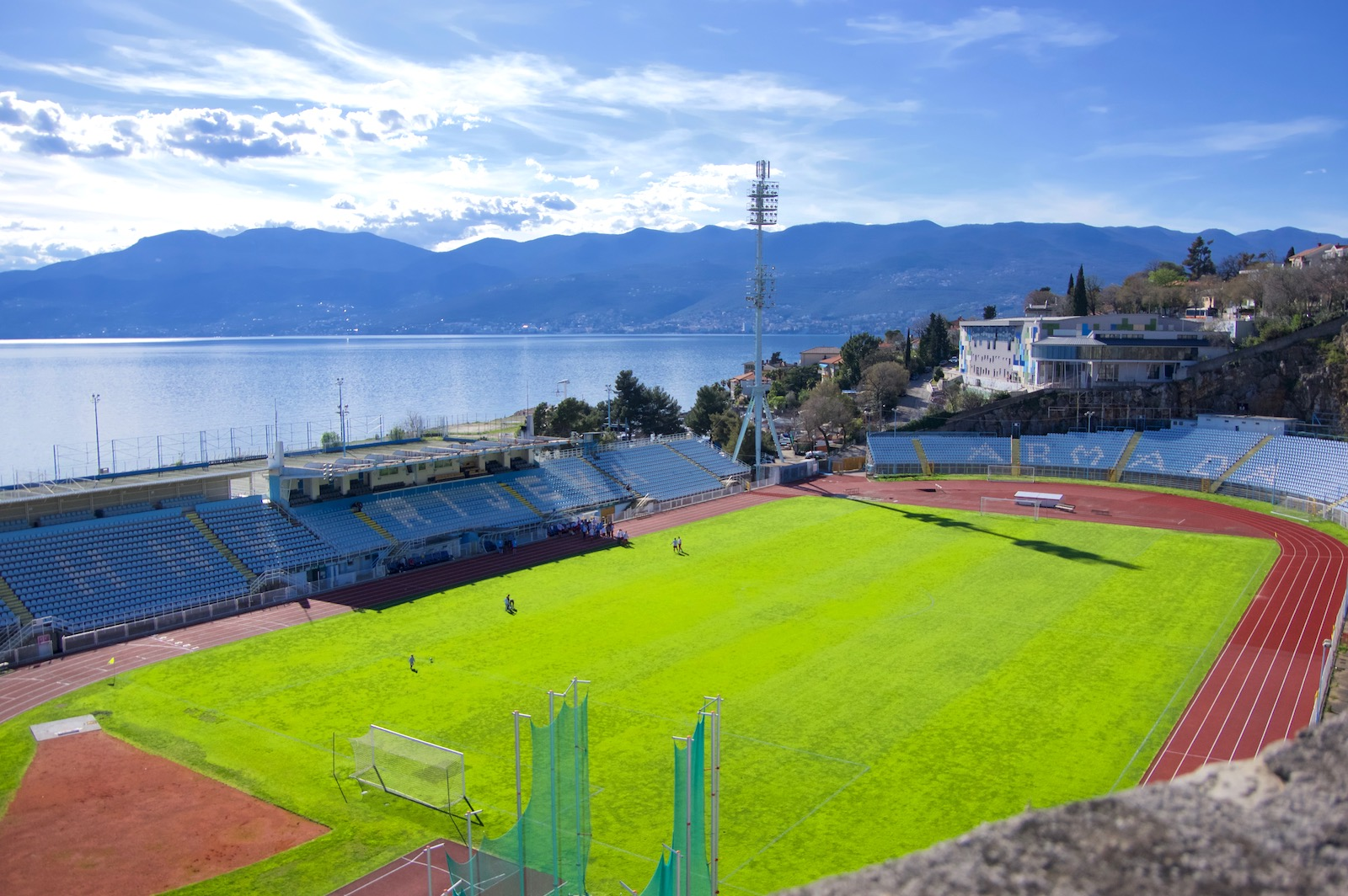
- Interactive map of Kantrida Stadium
- Full name: Kantrida Stadium
- Former names: Stadio Comunale del Littorio
- Address: Portić 3
- Location: Rijeka, Croatia
- Coordinates: 45.339202°N 14.380959°E
- Owner: City of Rijeka
- Operator: Rijeka Sport
- Capacity: 10,600
- Surface: Grass
- Record attendance: 22,000 (Rijeka vs Osijek, 26 May 1999)
- Field size: 105 m × 66 m (344 ft × 217 ft)

Construction
- Opened: 1913
- Renovated: 1925, 1951, 1958, 2029 (planned)
- Cost: €100 million (est.)
- Architect: ZDL arhitekt

Tenants
- HŠK Victoria (1913–1918); Olympia Fiume (1918–1926); U.S. Fiumana (1926–1946); SCF Quarnero (1946–1954); HNK Rijeka (1954–2015); NK Lokomotiva (2016, 2019–present); ŽNK Rijeka (2017–present); NK Opatija (2018–present); NK Krk (2023–present); Croatian national football team (1990–2011)

Website
- rijekasport.hr/hr/objekti/stadion-kantrida

Kantrida Stadium (Croatian: Stadion Kantrida) is a football stadium in the Croatian city of Rijeka. It is named after the Kantrida neighbourhood in which it is located, in the western part of the city. It has served as the home of the HNK Rijeka football club for most years since at least 1918. The stadium has a distinctive appearance as it is situated between steep cliffs, a remnant of an old quarry, just north of the stadium and the shore of the Adriatic on its south side.

Since 1990, the venue has occasionally been used for Croatia national football team's international fixtures. The national team has never been defeated at Kantrida. The stadium has a seating capacity of approximately 10,600. The stadium is scheduled for significant reconstruction over the next several years. A new state-of-the-art stadium will be built at the same location.

== History ==
The location was used as a stone quarry before the first football ground was created on the site in 1911 by HŠK Victoria, a football club based in Sušak (presently part of Rijeka; but at the time a separate town east of the city), and the first football match played at Kantrida was held in 1913, a friendly between Victoria and Građanski Zagreb.

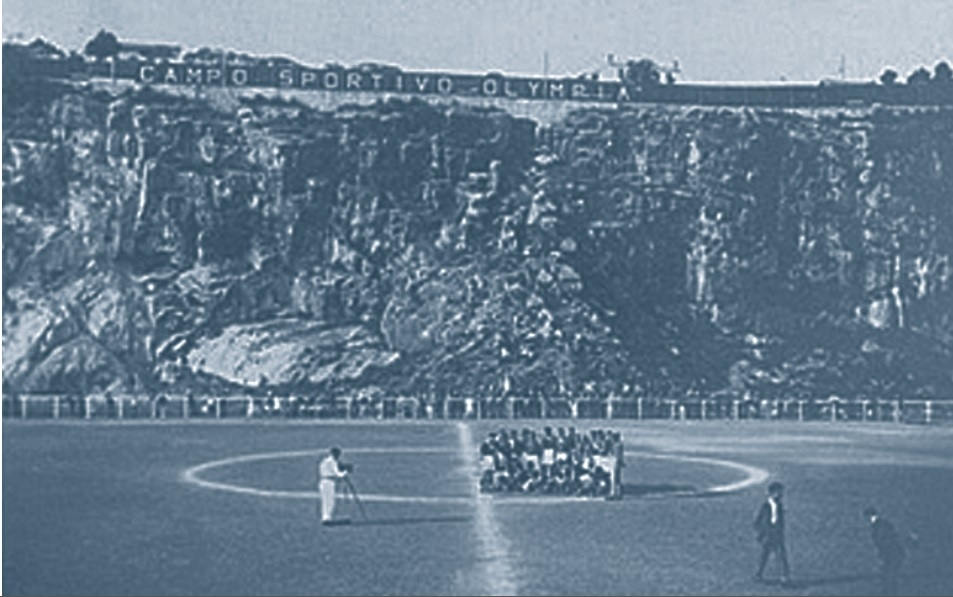
CS Olimpia at Kantrida in season 1921–22.

Victoria continued to use the stadium until the end of World War I and the collapse of Austria-Hungary in 1918. The city of Rijeka and the Kantrida territory were then first declared part of the Italian Regency of Carnaro (1919–1920), then the Free State of Fiume (1920–1924), before being formally annexed by the Kingdom of Italy in 1924, which remained unchanged until the end of World War II. During this period between 1919 and 1945 Victoria's home town of Sušak was located on the other side of the border as it was incorporated into the Kingdom of Yugoslavia, so the club stopped using the ground. Around this same time the stadium became also the main home ground of CS Olimpia, the predecessor to today's NK Rijeka, and became known as Campo Sportivo Olimpia and became being used for the local Free State of Fiume championship and consequently in the Italian competitions.

In 1926, the 8,000 capacity stands were built and the stadium changed its name to Stadio Borgomarina between 1926 and 1935, as this was the Italian name for the neighbourhood. The stadium was once again refurbished and reopened at a celebrational match between U.S. Fiumana and A.S. Roma, changing its name to Stadio Comunale del Littorio.

After World War II the city of Rijeka and its surrounding area became part of SFR Yugoslavia. The stadium was damaged during the Anglo-American bombings of the city, but the local club (now rebranded to SCF Quarnero) kept using the stadium until early 1947, when the stadium went into refurbishing and the club moved to Campo Cellini until 1951. The club returned to Stadion Kantrida following the completion of its renovation in 1951 and used it interchangeably with Campo Cellini until the mid-1950s. Quarnero changed their name to NK Rijeka in 1954. Since the mid-1950s, Stadion Kantrida has served as Rijeka's home ground.

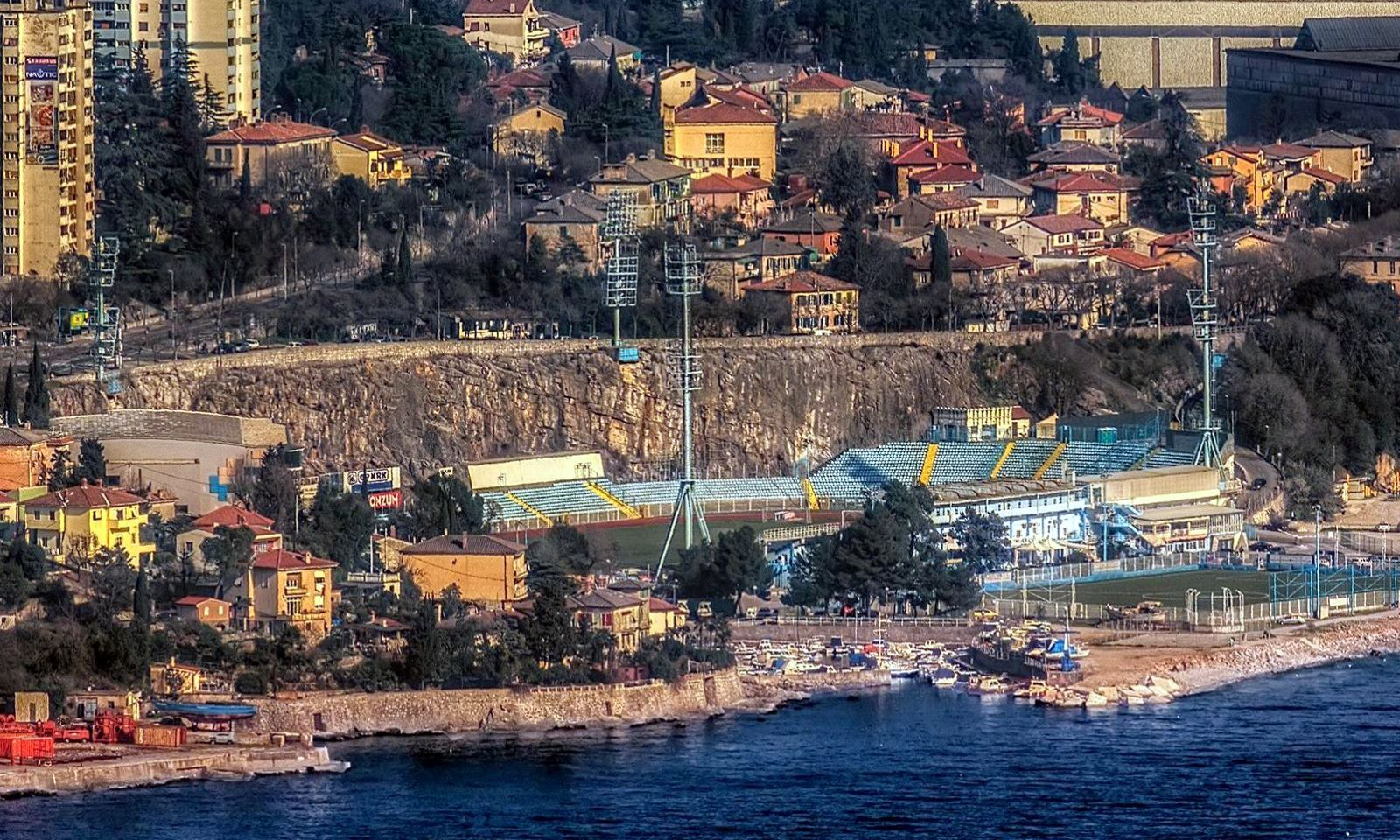
The stadium area from afar.

The stadium was renovated twice, in 1951 and 1958. It formerly had a capacity of 25,000, but in 1999 this was reduced to approximately 10,600 (due to the gradual evolution of UEFA safety standards) and floodlights were installed in 1975. In August 2012, a new 80m² LED display was installed, the largest in Croatia and one of the ten largest in Europe. In December 2013, Adamić press published a monograph that accounts for the first one-hundred years of Stadion Kantrida's history.

HNK Rijeka's final official match at Kantrida was played on 19 July 2015, when their Croatian First Football League clash against Slaven Belupo ended in a 3–3 draw. On 8 September 2018, HNK Rijeka returned to Kantrida, where they hosted Maribor in a friendly match organised by Armada Rijeka, played in front of a capacity crowd of over 10,000.

On 27 February 2016, Kantrida hosted a match between HNK Orijent 1919, a fourth-tier club from Rijeka, and NK Lošinj, a fellow 4. HNL club. The match was played at Kantrida due to a pitch upgrade on Orijent's home ground. On 23 and 25 March 2016, two 2016 UEFA European Under-19 Championship qualification matches were played at Kantrida when Croatia hosted Bulgaria (1–0) and Scotland (3–0). In 2016, Kantrida served as home ground for NK Lokomotiva, a 4. HNL club from Rijeka. Since mid-2017, Kantrida hosted ŽNK Rijeka who compete in the Croatian Women's First Football League. Since August 2018, Kantrida has hosted NK Opatija and, since August 2023, NK Krk.

== Future ==
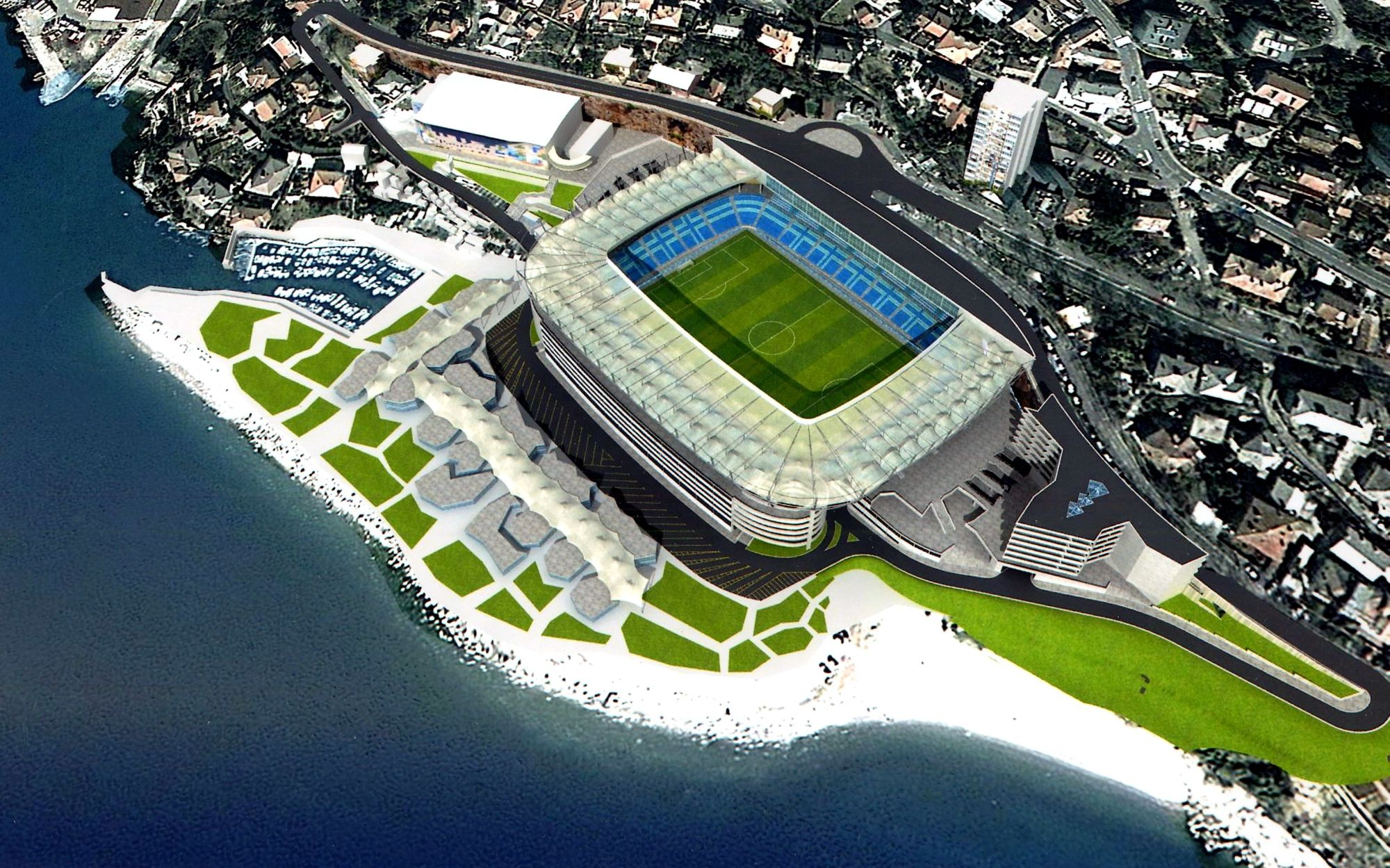
A past project for the new stadium.

On 11 July 2014, HNK Rijeka President Damir Mišković released a detailed structure design for the new Kantrida stadium. The current stadium was scheduled to be demolished, and a new, state-of-the-art stadium was to be built at the same location. The construction of the stadium was to be privately funded, with the cost estimated at €25 million, excluding the cost of commercial facilities (hotel and shopping centre) next to the stadium. During the stadium construction, HNK Rijeka play their home games at the newly built Stadion Rujevica. On 12 April 2019, a memorandum of understanding regarding the construction of the new stadium was signed between Stadion Kantrida LLC and Shaanxi Construction Engineering Group Corporation. These plans did not materialise, and the project remained on hold for close to a decade. In December 2023, plans were unveiled that, in addition to the stadium, investors plan to build a commercial complex, which will include three residential highrise towers and a hotel, with a total cost exceeding €100 million. The new Kantrida stadium will be located at the previous location but rotated 90 degrees from the previously proposed location, facing north-south. The facility is to be designed to accommodate 12,000 to 14,000 spectators and meet UEFA's fourth-category standards.

== Capacity per sector ==
Seven areas contribute to the total seating capacity of 10,261:

- VIP sector: 262
- Sector A (main stand): 793
- Sector B (main stand): 1,076
- Sector C (main stand): 1,144
- Sector D (west): 2,371 (traditionally Armada Rijeka sector)
- Sector E1 (east): 2,317 (includes away supporters' sector with 579 seats)
- Sector E (north-east): 499
- Sector F (north): 1,799

== Reviews ==
Kantrida is regarded by many as one of the most original and beautiful stadiums in the world. The stadium's location between a giant cliff and the sea earned it a place in the list of the world's most unusual football stadiums, compiled in 2011 by the CNN. In April 2014, the stadium was included in "The World's Top 13 Most Beautiful Sports Venues", as compiled by Eurosport. In November 2015, FourFourTwo included the stadium in its list of the world's 12 most beautiful football stadiums.

== Other uses ==
In addition to hosting HNK Rijeka matches until July 2015, the stadium was occasionally used to host other football matches and rock concerts. For example, in July 2006, the stadium hosted the Italian pop star Eros Ramazzotti. Kantrida also hosted the final stages of the annual Kvarnerska Rivijera international youth football tournament, first held in 1953. In addition, since 1990, the Croatia national football team played 11 international fixtures at Kantrida, including ten friendlies and one UEFA Euro 2012 qualifying fixture.

== International fixtures ==
#	Date	Competition	Opponent	Score	Att.	Ref
Croatia (1990–2011)
1.	22-12-1990	Friendly	Romania	2–0	5,000	
2.	28-02-1996	Friendly	Poland	2–1	10,000	
3.	03-06-1998	Friendly	Iran	2–0	10,000	
4.	28-02-2001	Friendly	Austria	1–0	2,000	
5.	13-02-2002	Friendly	Bulgaria	0–0	4,000	
6.	29-05-2004	Friendly	Slovakia	1–0	7,000	
7.	07-02-2007	Friendly	Norway	2–1	8,000	
8.	16-10-2007	Friendly	Slovakia	3–0	6,000	
9.	24-05-2008	Friendly	Moldova	1–0	8,000	
10.	08-10-2009	Friendly	Qatar	3–2	6,000	
11.	11-10-2011	Euro 2012 Qualifying	Latvia	2–0	8,370	

== Notable fixtures ==
#	Date	Competition	Home team	Away team	Score	Att.	Ref.
1.	03-02-1976	Friendly	Rijeka	Soviet Union	2–3	11,000	
2.	16-05-1979	Yugoslav Cup Final	Rijeka	Partizan	2–1	20,000	
3.	05-03-1980	Cup Winners' Cup QF	Rijeka	Juventus	0–0	20,000	
4.	24-10-1984	UEFA Cup	Rijeka	Real Madrid	3–1	22,000	
5.	15-06-1994	Croatian Cup Final	Rijeka	Dinamo	1–0	15,000	
6.	23-08-1995	Champions League	Hajduk Split	Panathinaikos	1–1	13,000	
7.	02-05-1999	Prva HNL	Rijeka	Hajduk Split	3–3	20,000	
8.	26-05-1999	Prva HNL	Rijeka	Osijek	1–1	22,000	
9.	04-08-1999	Champions League	Rijeka	Partizan	0–3	10,000	
10.	11-05-2005	Croatian Cup Final	Rijeka	Hajduk Split	2–1	9,000	
11.	27-04-2006	Croatian Cup Final	Rijeka	Varteks	4–0	8,000	
12.	22-08-2013	Europa League	Rijeka	Stuttgart	2–1	10,500	
13.	03-10-2013	Europa League	Rijeka	Real Betis	1–1	7,313	
14.	07-11-2013	Europa League	Rijeka	Lyon	1–1	7,300	
15.	28-11-2013	Europa League	Rijeka	Vitória	0–0	7,138	
16.	13-05-2014	Croatian Cup Final	Rijeka	Dinamo	2–0	11,000	
17.	11-07-2014	Croatian Supercup	Dinamo	Rijeka	1–2	7,500	
18.	02-10-2014	Europa League	Rijeka	Sevilla	2–2	9,256	
19.	23-10-2014	Europa League	Rijeka	Feyenoord	3–1	9,326	
20.	27-11-2014	Europa League	Rijeka	Standard Liège	2–0	8,950	
21.	08-09-2018	Friendly	Rijeka	Maribor	4–0	10,000	
