= 1979–80 NK Rijeka season =

Rijeka
1979–80 season
- Chairman: Zvonko Poščić, Nikola Jurčević
- Manager: Miroslav Blažević
- First League: 10th
- Cup: Round 1
- Cup Winners’ Cup: Quarterfinal
- Balkans Cup: Runners-up
- Top goalscorer: League: Milan Radović (10); All: Milan Radović (12)
- Highest home attendance: 22,000 vs (Italy) Juventus (5 March 1980 - European Cup Winners' Cup)
- Lowest home attendance: 2,000 (4 times - Yugoslav First League)
- Average home league attendance: 5,353

The 1979–80 season was the 34th season in Rijeka’s history and their 18th season in the Yugoslav First League. Their 10th place finish in the 1978–79 season meant it was their sixth successive season playing in the Yugoslav First League.

== Competitions ==
Competition	First match	Last match	Starting round	Final position	Record							
Competition	First match	Last match	Starting round	Final position	G	W	D	L	GF	GA	GD	Win %
Yugoslav First League	15 July 1979	29 June 1980	Matchday 1	10th	34	12	9	13	34	47	−13	35.29
Yugoslav Cup	19 October 1979	19 October 1979	First round	First round	1	0	1	0	1	1	+0	0.00
European Cup Winners' Cup	19 September 1979	19 March 1980	First round	Quarterfinal	6	2	2	2	5	5	+0	33.33
Total					41	14	12	15	40	53	−13	34.15

=== Yugoslav First League ===
==== Classification ====
Pos	Team	Pld	W	D	L	GF	GA	GD	Pts	Qualification or relegation
8	Velež	34	13	8	13	44	39	+5	34	Qualification for Balkans Cup
9	Željezničar	34	9	15	10	41	47	−6	33	
10	Rijeka	34	12	9	13	34	47	−13	33	
11	Budućnost	34	10	12	12	34	34	0	32	
12	Dinamo Zagreb	34	9	14	11	43	44	−1	32	Qualification for Cup Winners' Cup first round

Source: rsssf.org
Rules for classification: 1) points; 2) goal difference; 3) number of goals scored.

==== Results summary ====
Overall								Home						Away					
Pld	W	D	L	GF	GA	GD	Pts	W	D	L	GF	GA	GD	W	D	L	GF	GA	GD
34	12	9	13	34	47	−13	45	9	8	0	23	7	+16	3	1	13	11	40	−29

==== Results by round ====
Round	1	2	3	4	5	6	7	8	9	10	11	12	13	14	15	16	17	18	19	20	21	22	23	24	25	26	27	28	29	30	31	32	33	34
Ground	A	H	A	A	H	A	H	A	H	A	H	A	H	A	H	A	H	H	A	H	H	A	H	A	H	H	A	A	H	A	H	A	H	A
Result	L	W	L	W	D	L	D	W	D	L	W	L	D	L	W	L	D	W	L	W	W	L	D	L	W	W	L	W	D	D	D	L	W	L
Position	17	12	14	10	11	13	14	11	11	11	11	11	12	13	12	14	13	11	13	12	10	11	10	14	12	8	10	7	9	9	9	13	9	10

Source: Competitive matches
A = Away; H = Home; W = Win; D = Draw; L = Loss

== Matches ==
=== First League ===
Round	Date	Venue	Opponent	Score	Attendance	Rijeka Scorers
1	15 Jul	A	Vardar	1 – 3	20,000	Cukrov
2	22 Jul	H	Čelik	1 – 0	3,500	Jerolimov
3	29 Jul	A	Napredak Kruševac	1 – 5	20,000	Radović
4	1 Aug	A	Budućnost	2 – 1	5,000	Radović (2)
5	4 Aug	H	Sarajevo	1 – 1	2,000	Ružić
6	12 Aug	A	Partizan	0 – 2	25,000	
7	19 Aug	H	Osijek	0 – 0	5,000	
8	26 Aug	A	Sloboda	1 – 0	5,000	Desnica
9	2 Sep	H	Borac Banja Luka	0 – 0	8,000	
10	6 Sep	A	Velež	1 – 3	5,000	Tomić
11	9 Sep	H	Olimpija	2 – 0	5,000	Radović, Nikolić
12	7 Oct	A	Vojvodina	1 – 3	2,000	Bursać
13	14 Oct	H	Željezničar	2 – 2	6,000	Tomić (2)
14	20 Oct	A	Red Star	0 – 3	17,000	
15	3 Nov	H	Hajduk Split	2 – 0	15,000	Radović (2)
16	17 Nov	A	Dinamo Zagreb	1 – 5	5,000	Radović
17	25 Nov	H	Radnički Niš	0 – 0	5,000	
18	1 Mar	H	Vardar	4 – 0	2,000	Hrstić, Tomić, Radović, Bačvarević
19	9 Mar	A	Čelik	0 – 1	5,000	
20	12 Mar	H	Napredak Kruševac	2 – 1	3,000	Radović, Mijač
21	15 Mar	H	Budućnost	2 – 0	2,000	Mijač, Fegic
22	6 Apr	A	Sarajevo	0 – 2	9,000	
23	13 Apr	H	Partizan	0 – 0	8,000	
24	20 Apr	A	Osijek	0 – 2	2,000	
25	4 May	H	Sloboda	1 – 0	2,000	Tomić
26	11 May	H	Velež	1 – 0	3,000	Tomić
27	18 May	A	Borac Banja Luka	0 – 3	4,000	
28	25 May	A	Olimpija	1 – 0	5,000	Tomić
29	1 Jun	H	Vojvodina	1 – 1	3,000	Ružić
30	5 Jun	A	Željezničar	1 – 1	15,000	Tomić
31	8 Jun	H	Red Star	2 – 2	10,000	Ružić, Bursać
32	15 Jun	A	Hajduk Split	1 – 4	8,000	Ružić
33	22 Jun	H	Dinamo Zagreb	2 – 0	8,000	Radović, Ružić
34	29 Jun	A	Radnički Niš	0 – 2	6,000	

Source: rsssf.com

=== Yugoslav Cup ===
Round	Date	Venue	Opponent	Score	Rijeka Scorers
R1	17 Oct	A	Sarajevo	1 – 1 (2–4 p)	Tomić

Source: rsssf.com

=== Cup Winners' Cup ===
Round	Date	Venue	Opponent	Score	Attendance	Rijeka Scorers
R1	19 Sep	A	Beerschot (Belgium)	0 – 0	14,000	
R1	3 Oct	H	Beerschot (Belgium)	2 – 1	12,000	Radović (2)
R2	24 Oct	A	Lokomotíva Košice (Czechoslovakia)	0 – 2	5,000	
R2	7 Nov	H	Lokomotíva Košice (Czechoslovakia)	3 – 0	18,000	Desnica (3)
QF	5 Mar	H	Juventus (Italy)	0 – 0	22,000	
QF	19 Mar	A	Juventus (Italy)	0 – 2	55,000	

Source: worldfootball.net

=== Squad statistics ===
Competitive matches only.

Name	Apps	Goals	Apps	Goals	Apps	Goals	Apps	Goals
Name	League		Cup		Europe		Total	
(Socialist Federal Republic of Yugoslavia) Radojko Avramović	1+0	0	0+0	0	0+0	0	1	0
(Socialist Federal Republic of Yugoslavia) Sergio Machin	27+1	0	1+0	0	5+0	0	34	0
(Socialist Federal Republic of Yugoslavia) Nikica Cukrov	16+0	1	1+0	0	4+0	0	21	1
(Socialist Federal Republic of Yugoslavia) Savo Filipović	8+1	0	0+0	0	0+0	0	9	0
(Socialist Federal Republic of Yugoslavia) Zvjezdan Radin	16+0	0	1+0	0	5+0	0	22	0
(Socialist Federal Republic of Yugoslavia) Miloš Hrstić	24+0	1	1+0	0	6+0	0	31	1
(Socialist Federal Republic of Yugoslavia) Milan Ružić	26+0	5	0+0	0	6+0	0	32	5
(Socialist Federal Republic of Yugoslavia) Srećko Juričić	32+0	0	1+0	0	6+0	0	39	0
(Socialist Federal Republic of Yugoslavia) Milan Radović	29+0	10	1+0	0	6+0	2	36	12
(Socialist Federal Republic of Yugoslavia) Damir Desnica	13+0	1	1+0	0	4+0	3	18	4
(Socialist Federal Republic of Yugoslavia) Dragoljub Bursać	5+5	2	0+0	0	0+1	0	11	2
(Socialist Federal Republic of Yugoslavia) Nikica Milenković	15+3	0	1+0	0	5+0	0	24	0
(Socialist Federal Republic of Yugoslavia) Duško Lukić	16+0	0	0+0	0	2+0	0	18	0
(Socialist Federal Republic of Yugoslavia) Željko Mijač	16+5	2	0+1	0	2+0	0	24	2
(Socialist Federal Republic of Yugoslavia) Ive Jerolimov	19+5	1	0+0	0	1+1	0	26	1
(Socialist Federal Republic of Yugoslavia) Miroslav Šugar	17+0	0	0+0	0	2+0	0	19	0
(Socialist Federal Republic of Yugoslavia) Adriano Fegic	8+3	1	0+0	0	0+1	0	12	1
(Socialist Federal Republic of Yugoslavia) Edmond Tomić	18+8	8	1+0	1	3+2	0	32	9
(Socialist Federal Republic of Yugoslavia) Milan Bačvarević	13+2	1	1+0	0	3+1	0	20	1
(Socialist Federal Republic of Yugoslavia) Mauro Ravnić	30+0	0	1+0	0	6+0	0	37	0
(Socialist Federal Republic of Yugoslavia) Željko Maretić	7+1	0	0+0	0	0+0	0	8	0
(Socialist Federal Republic of Yugoslavia) Danko Peranić	1+0	0	0+0	0	0+0	0	1	0
(Socialist Federal Republic of Yugoslavia) Željko Nikolić	8+3	1	0+0	0	0+0	0	11	1
(Socialist Federal Republic of Yugoslavia) Nebojša Petrović	3+2	0	0+0	0	0+1	0	6	0
(Socialist Federal Republic of Yugoslavia) Nenad Gračan	2+1	0	0+0	0	0+0	0	3	0
(Socialist Federal Republic of Yugoslavia) Milivoj Pršo	1+1	0	0+0	0	0+0	0	2	0
(Socialist Federal Republic of Yugoslavia) Neshat Zhavelli	3+0	0	0+0	0	0+0	0	3	0
(Socialist Federal Republic of Yugoslavia) Rade Ljepojević	0+1	0	0+0	0	0+0	0	1	0
(Socialist Federal Republic of Yugoslavia) Mladen Stipančić	0+1	0	0+0	0	0+0	0	1	0

== See also ==
- 1979–80 Yugoslav First League
- 1979–80 Yugoslav Cup
- 1979–80 European Cup Winners' Cup

== External sources ==
- 1979–80 Yugoslav First League at rsssf.com
- Prvenstvo 1979.-80. at nk-rijeka.hr
