= HNK Rijeka in European football =

Croatian club in European football

- Club: Rijeka
- Seasons played: 26
- First entry: 1978–79 European Cup Winners' Cup
- Latest entry: 2026–27 UEFA Conference League

HNK Rijeka are a Croatian football club. This article details their record in UEFA club competitions.

== History ==
HNK Rijeka has participated in UEFA competitions on 26 occasions, with 22 appearances since 1999 and 14 consecutive appearances since 2013–14. The club's greatest achievement was the 1978–79 European Cup Winners' Cup quarter-final, where they lost 2–0 on aggregate against Juventus. Among other notable continental successes, Rijeka qualified for the group stage of the UEFA Europa League in two consecutive seasons, in 2013–14 and 2014–15, keeping an undefeated run for 12 consecutive home matches. They also qualified for the group stages in 2017–18 and 2020–21. Rijeka is one of only three Croatian clubs that have qualified for the group stages of UEFA Champions League or Europa League. In 2014–15, Rijeka became the first club from former Yugoslavia to win eight European fixtures in one season. Rijeka faced eventual competition winners on two occasions, Real Madrid in the 1984–85 UEFA Cup and Sevilla in the 2014–15 UEFA Europa League.

== Matches in Europe ==
=== By competition ===
Competition	Pld	W	D	L	GF	GA	Last season played
UEFA Champions League	10	2	3	5	11	14	2025–26
UEFA Cup / UEFA Europa League	76	29	19	28	105	97	2025–26
UEFA Conference League	32	14	9	9	41	33	2026–27
UEFA Cup Winners' Cup	10	3	3	4	8	9	1979–80
UEFA Intertoto Cup	4	1	1	2	3	5	2008
Total	132	49	35	48	168	158	+10

Source: UEFA.com, Fully up to date as of 27 August 2026.
Pld = Matches played; W = Matches won; D = Matches drawn; L = Matches lost; GF = Goals for; GA = Goals against. Defunct competitions indicated in italics.

=== By ground ===
Ground	Pld	W	D	L	GF	GA	GD
Home	66	34	16	16	102	61	+41
Away	66	15	19	32	66	97	−31
Total	132	49	35	48	168	158	+10

Source: uefa.com, Fully up to date as of 27 August 2026.
Pld = Matches played; W = Matches won; D = Matches drawn; L = Matches lost; GF = Goals for; GA = Goals against.

=== By season ===
Non-UEFA competitions are listed in italics.

Season	Competition	Round	Opponent	Home	Away	Agg.
1962–63	Intertoto Cup	Group; B3	(West Germany) Rot-Weiß Oberhausen	2–1	3–4	1st out of 4
1962–63	Intertoto Cup	Group; B3	(Switzerland) Basel	5–1	2–2	1st out of 4
1962–63	Intertoto Cup	Group; B3	(Netherlands) PSV Eindhoven	3–1	3–2	1st out of 4
1962–63	Intertoto Cup	QF	(Hungary) Dozsa Pecs	2–2	1–2	3–4
1965–66	Intertoto Cup	Group; B1	(East Germany) Motor Jena	0–3	1–3	4th out of 4
1965–66	Intertoto Cup	Group; B1	(Czechoslovakia) Tatran Prešov	0–0	1–3	4th out of 4
1965–66	Intertoto Cup	Group; B1	(Poland) Szombierki Bytom	0–3	1–0	4th out of 4
1974–75	Mitropa Cup	Group; A	(Hungary) Tatabánya	3–1	1–3	2nd out of 3
1974–75	Mitropa Cup	Group; A	(Austria) Wacker Innsbruck	1–3	0–0	2nd out of 3
1977–78	Intertoto Cup	Group; 6	(Denmark) Frem Kobenhavn	2–2	0–2	3rd out of 4
1977–78	Intertoto Cup	Group; 6	(Poland) Ruch Chorzów	0–1	4–2	3rd out of 4
1977–78	Intertoto Cup	Group; 6	(Austria) Grazer AK	1–1	3–0	3rd out of 4
1978–79	Balkans Cup	Group; B	(Albania) Skënderbeu	6–0	0–1	1st out of 3
1978–79	Balkans Cup	Group; B	(Greece) Aris Thessaloniki	2–0	2–1	1st out of 3
1978–79	Balkans Cup	Final	(Romania) Jiul Petroșani	4–1	0–1	4–2
1978–79	Cup Winners' Cup	R1	(Wales) Wrexham	3–0	0–2	3–2
1978–79	Cup Winners' Cup	R2	(Belgium) Beveren	0–0	0–2	0–2
1979–80	Balkans Cup	Group; A	(Greece) PAS Giannina	2–1	3–1	1st out of 3
1979–80	Balkans Cup	Group; A	(Albania) Partizani Tirana	3–0	1–4	1st out of 3
1979–80	Balkans Cup	Final	(Romania) Sportul Studențesc	1–1	0–2	1–3
1979–80	Cup Winners' Cup	R1	(Belgium) Germinal Beerschot	2–1	0–0	2–1
1979–80	Cup Winners' Cup	R2	(Czechoslovakia) Lokomotíva Košice	3–0	0–2	3–2
1979–80	Cup Winners' Cup	QF	(Italy) Juventus	0–0	0–2	0–2
1984–85	UEFA Cup	R1	(Spain) Valladolid	4–1	0–1	4–2
1984–85	UEFA Cup	R2	(Spain) Real Madrid	3–1	0–3	3–4
1985–86	Mitropa Cup	SF	(Hungary) Debreceni	0–1^{†}		–
1985–86	Mitropa Cup	3rd Pl.	(Czechoslovakia) Sigma Olomouc	3–2^{†}		–
1986–87	UEFA Cup	R1	(Belgium) Standard Liège	0–1	1–1	1–2
1999–2000	Champions League	QR2	(Federal Republic of Yugoslavia) Partizan	0–3	1–3	1–6
2000–01	UEFA Cup	QR	(Malta) Valletta	3–2	5–4 (a.e.t.)	8–6
2000–01	UEFA Cup	R1	(Spain) Celta Vigo	0–1 (a.e.t.)	0–0	0–1
2002–03	Intertoto Cup	R1	(Republic of Ireland) St Patrick's Athletic	3–2	0–1	3–3 (a)
2004–05	UEFA Cup	QR2	(Turkey) Gençlerbirliği	2–1	0–1	2–2 (a)
2005–06	UEFA Cup	QR2	(Bulgaria) Litex Lovech	2–1	0–1	2–2 (a)
2006–07	UEFA Cup	QR1	(Cyprus) Omonia	2–2	1–2	3–4
2008–09	Intertoto Cup	R1	(North Macedonia) Renova	0–0	0–2	0–2
2009–10	Europa League	QR2	(Luxembourg) Differdange	3–0	0–1	3–1
2009–10	Europa League	QR3	(Ukraine) Metalist Kharkiv	1–2	0–2	1–4
2013–14	Europa League	QR2	(Wales) Prestatyn Town	5–0	3–0	8–0
2013–14	Europa League	QR3	(Slovakia) Žilina	2–1	1–1	3–2
2013–14	Europa League	PO	(Germany) VfB Stuttgart	2–1	2–2	4–3
2013–14	Europa League	Group I	(Portugal) Vitória de Guimarães	0–0	0–4	4th out of 4
2013–14	Europa League	Group I	(Spain) Real Betis	1–1	0–0	4th out of 4
2013–14	Europa League	Group I	(France) Lyon	1–1	0–1	4th out of 4
2014–15	Europa League	QR2	(Hungary) Ferencváros	1–0	2–1	3–1
2014–15	Europa League	QR3	(Faroe Islands) Víkingur	4–0	5–1	9–1
2014–15	Europa League	PO	(Moldova) Sheriff Tiraspol	1–0	3–0	4–0
2014–15	Europa League	Group G	(Belgium) Standard Liège	2–0	0–2	3rd out of 4
2014–15	Europa League	Group G	(Spain) Sevilla	2–2	0–1	3rd out of 4
2014–15	Europa League	Group G	(Netherlands) Feyenoord	3–1	0–2	3rd out of 4
2015–16	Europa League	QR2	(Scotland) Aberdeen	0–3	2–2	2–5
2016–17	Europa League	QR3	(Turkey) İstanbul Başakşehir	2–2	0–0	2–2 (a)
2017–18	Champions League	QR2	(Wales) The New Saints	2–0	5–1	7–1
2017–18	Champions League	QR3	(Austria) Red Bull Salzburg	0–0	1–1	1–1 (a)
2017–18	Champions League	PO	(Greece) Olympiacos	0–1	1–2	1–3
2017–18	Europa League	Group D	(Greece) AEK Athens	1–2	2–2	3rd out of 4
2017–18	Europa League	Group D	(Italy) Milan	2–0	2–3	3rd out of 4
2017–18	Europa League	Group D	Austria Wien	1–4	3–1	3rd out of 4
2018–19	Europa League	QR3	(Norway) Sarpsborg 08	0–1	1–1	1–2
2019–20	Europa League	QR3	(Scotland) Aberdeen	2–0	2–0	4–0
2019–20	Europa League	PO	(Belgium) Gent	1–1	1–2	2–3
2020–21	Europa League	QR3	(Ukraine) Kolos Kovalivka	2–0 (a.e.t.)		
2020–21	Europa League	PO	(Denmark) Copenhagen		1–0	
2020–21	Europa League	Group F	(Italy) Napoli	1–2	0–2	4th out of 4
2020–21	Europa League	Group F	(Spain) Real Sociedad	0–1	2–2	4th out of 4
2020–21	Europa League	Group F	(Netherlands) AZ	2–1	1–4	4th out of 4
2021–22	Europa Conference League	QR2	(Malta) Gżira United	1–0	2–0	3–0
2021–22	Europa Conference League	QR3	(Scotland) Hibernian	4–1	1–1	5–2
2021–22	Europa Conference League	PO	(Greece) PAOK	0–2	1–1	1–3
2022–23	Europa Conference League	QR2	(Sweden) Djurgården	1–2	0–2	1–4
2023–24	Europa Conference League	QR2	(Kosovo) Dukagjini	6–1	1–0	7–1
2023–24	Europa Conference League	QR3	(Faroe Islands) B36 Tórshavn	2–0	3–1	5–1
2023–24	Europa Conference League	PO	(France) Lille	1–1 (a.e.t.)	1–2	2–3
2024–25	Europa League	QR2	(Romania) Corvinul Hunedoara	1–0	0–0	1–0
2024–25	Europa League	QR3	(Sweden) IF Elfsborg	1–1	0–2	1–3
2024–25	Conference League	PO	(Slovenia) Olimpija Ljubljana	1–1	0–5	1–6
2025–26	Champions League	QR2	(Bulgaria) Ludogorets Razgrad	0–0	1–3 (a.e.t.)	1–3
2025–26	Europa League	QR3	(Republic of Ireland) Shelbourne	1–2	3–1	4–3
2025–26	Europa League	PO	(Greece) PAOK	1–0	0–5	1–5
2025–26	Conference League	LP	(Armenia) Noah	—N/a	0–1	16th out of 36
2025–26	Conference League	LP	(Czech Republic) Sparta Prague	1–0	—N/a	16th out of 36
2025–26	Conference League	LP	(Gibraltar) Lincoln Red Imps	—N/a	1–1	16th out of 36
2025–26	Conference League	LP	(Cyprus) AEK Larnaca	0–0	—N/a	16th out of 36
2025–26	Conference League	LP	(Slovenia) Celje	3–0	—N/a	16th out of 36
2025–26	Conference League	LP	(Ukraine) Shakhtar Donetsk	—N/a	0–0	16th out of 36
2025–26	Conference League	KPO	(Cyprus) Omonia	3–1	1–0	4–1
2025–26	Conference League	R16	(France) Strasbourg	1–2	1–1	2–3
2026–27	Conference League	QR2	(Republic of Ireland) Derry City	1–0	1–0	2–0
2026–27	Conference League	QR3	(Finland) Ilves	1–0	1–1	2–1
2026–27	Conference League	PO	(Denmark) Midtjylland	1–4	0–2	1–6

Last updated on 27 August 2026.

== Records and statistics ==
=== Record wins and defeats ===
- Home win
  - **6–1** v. (Kosovo) Dukagjini, 2023–24, 3 August 2023.
  - **5–0** v. (Wales) Prestatyn Town, 2013–14, 18 July 2013.
- Away win
  - **5–1** v. (Faroe Islands) Víkingur, 2014–15, 31 July 2014.
  - **5–1** v. (Wales) The New Saints, 2017–18, 18 July 2017.
- Home defeat
  - **0–3** v. (Serbia and Montenegro) Partizan, 1999–2000, 4 August 1999.
  - **0–3** v. (Scotland) Aberdeen, 2015–16, 16 July 2015.
  - **1–4** v. Austria Wien, 2017–18, 2 November 2017.
  - **1–4** v. (Denmark) Midtjylland, 2026–27, 27 August 2026.
- Away defeat
  - **0–5** v. (Slovenia) Olimpija Ljubljana, 2024–25, 29 August 2024.
  - **0–5** v. (Greece) PAOK, 2025–26, 28 August 2025.

=== Record by country of opposition ===
Updated as of 27 August 2026.

Country	Pld	W	D	L	GF	GA	GD	Win%
Armenia	1	0	0	1	0	1	−1	0.00
Austria	4	1	2	1	5	6	−1	25.00
Belgium	10	2	4	4	7	10	−3	20.00
Bulgaria	4	1	1	2	3	5	−2	25.00
Cyprus	5	2	2	1	6	5	+1	40.00
Czech Republic	1	1	0	0	1	0	+1	100.00
Denmark	3	1	0	2	2	6	−4	33.33
Faroe Islands	4	4	0	0	14	2	+12	100.00
Finland	2	1	1	0	2	1	+1	50.00
France	6	0	3	3	5	8	−3	0.00
Germany	2	1	1	0	4	3	+1	50.00
Gibraltar	1	0	1	0	1	1	+0	0.00
Greece	8	1	2	5	6	15	−9	12.50
Hungary	2	2	0	0	3	1	+2	100.00
Ireland	6	4	0	2	9	6	+3	66.67
Italy	6	1	1	4	5	9	−4	16.67
Kosovo	2	2	0	0	7	1	+6	100.00
Luxembourg	2	1	0	1	3	1	+2	50.00
Macedonia	2	0	1	1	0	2	−2	0.00
Malta	4	4	0	0	11	6	+5	100.00
Moldova	2	2	0	0	4	0	+4	100.00
Netherlands	4	2	0	2	6	8	−2	50.00
Norway	2	0	1	1	1	2	−1	0.00
Portugal	2	0	1	1	0	4	−4	0.00
Romania	2	1	1	0	1	0	+1	50.00
Scotland	6	3	2	1	11	7	+4	50.00
Serbia	2	0	0	2	1	6	−5	0.00
Slovakia	4	2	1	1	6	4	+2	50.00
Slovenia	3	1	1	1	4	6	−2	33.33
Spain	12	2	5	5	12	14	−2	16.67
Sweden	4	0	1	3	2	7	−5	0.00
Turkey	4	1	2	1	4	4	+0	25.00
Ukraine	4	1	1	2	3	4	−1	25.00
Wales	6	5	0	1	18	3	+15	83.33

=== Player and manager statistics ===
Updated on 27 August 2026.

**Players with most European appearances**

Player	Apps
(Bosnia and Herzegovina) Zoran Kvržić	38
(Croatia) Ivan Tomečak	38
(Croatia) **Toni Fruk**	32
(Croatia) **Niko Janković**	27
(Croatia) **Ante Majstorović**	24
(Croatia) Mate Maleš	24
(Serbia) **Mladen Devetak**	23
(Bosnia and Herzegovina) Stjepan Radeljić	23
(Croatia) Ivan Vargić	23
(Portugal) **Tiago Dantas**	22
(Lithuania) **Justas Lasickas**	22
(Croatia) Anas Sharbini	22
(Bosnia and Herzegovina) Martin Zlomislić	22
(Croatia) **Ante Oreč**	21

**Top-scoring players in European competitions**

Player	Goals
(Croatia) Andrej Kramarić	8
(Croatia) **Toni Fruk**	7
(Bosnia and Herzegovina) Zoran Kvržić	7
(Croatia) Leon Benko	6
(Switzerland) Mario Gavranović	6
(England) **Daniel Adu-Adjei**	5
(Socialist Federal Republic of Yugoslavia) Damir Desnica	4
(Socialist Federal Republic of Yugoslavia) Adriano Fegic	4
(Austria) Alexander Gorgon	4
(Croatia) Franjo Ivanović	4
(North Macedonia) Adis Jahović	4
(Croatia) **Niko Janković**	4
(Croatia) Marco Pašalić	3

**Managers with most European appearances**

Coach	Apps
(Slovenia) **Matjaž Kek**	48
(Spain) Víctor Sánchez	10
(Montenegro) Radomir Đalović	9
(Slovenia) Simon Rožman	8
(Socialist Federal Republic of Yugoslavia) Miroslav Blažević	7
(Croatia) Nenad Gračan	7
(Socialist Federal Republic of Yugoslavia) Josip Skoblar	7
(Croatia) Goran Tomić	7
(Croatia) Željko Sopić	5
(Croatia) Igor Bišćan	4
(Bosnia and Herzegovina) Sergej Jakirović	4
(Croatia) Robert Rubčić	4
(Croatia) Elvis Scoria	4
(Socialist Federal Republic of Yugoslavia) Dragutin Spasojević	4

Players and manager in bold are currently active for Rijeka.

- Most goals in a single match:
  - 3 goals:
    - Damir Desnica (7 November 1979 v Lokomotíva Košice)
    - Leon Benko (18 July 2013 v Prestatyn Town)
    - Adis Jahović (7 August 2014 v Víkingur)
    - Andrej Kramarić (23 October 2014 v Feyenoord)
    - Franjo Ivanović (3 August 2023 v Dukagjini)

== UEFA coefficient history (2013–) ==
Updated on 19 March 2026.

In European football, UEFA coefficients are used to rank and seed teams in club competitions. The coefficients are calculated by UEFA, who administer football within Europe.

=== 2013–2018 ===
Source: Bert Kassies website

Accumulated	Valid	Rank	Movement	Coefficient	Change
2008–09 to 2012–13	2013–14	241	▼ –12	4.916	▲ +0.142
2009–10 to 2013–14	2014–15	178	▲ +63	8.925	▲ +4.009
2010–11 to 2014–15	2015–16	131	▲ +47	13.700	▲ +4.775
2011–12 to 2015–16	2016–17	127	▲ +4	14.275	▲ +0.575
2012–13 to 2016–17	2017–18	125	▲ +2	15.550	▲ +1.275

=== 2018– ===
==== 5-year calculation ====
Source: Bert Kassies website

Accumulated	Valid	Rank	Movement	Coefficient	Change
2013–14 to 2017–18	2018–19	91	▲ +34	15.500	—
2014–15 to 2018–19	2019–20	104	▼ –13	13.500	▼ –2.000
2015–16 to 2019–20	2020–21	121	▼ –17	11.000	▼ –2.500
2016–17 to 2020–21	2021–22	113	▲ +8	13.500	▲ +2.500
2017–18 to 2021–22	2022–23	104	▲ +9	15.000	▲ +1.500
2018–19 to 2022–23	2023–24	127	▼ –23	11.500	▼ –3.500
2019–20 to 2023–24	2024–25	123	▲ +4	12.000	▲ +0.500
2020–21 to 2024–25	2025–26	134	▼ –11	12.000	Steady
2021–22 to 2025–26	2026–27	109	▲ +25	18.625	▲ +6.625
2022–23 to 2026–27	2027–28	104	▲ +5	18.625	Steady

==== 10-year calculation ====
Source: Bert Kassies website

Accumulated	Valid	Rank	Movement	Coefficient	Change
2008–09 to 2017–18	2018–19	173	—	16.500	—
2009–10 to 2018–19	2019–20	161	▲ +12	18.500	▲ +2.000
2010–11 to 2019–20	2020–21	150	▲ +11	20.000	▲ +1.500
2011–12 to 2020–21	2021–22	130	▲ +20	23.000	▲ +3.000
2012–13 to 2021–22	2022–23	124	▲ +6	25.500	▲ +2.500
2013–14 to 2022–23	2023–24	123	▲ +1	27.000	▲ +1.500
2014–15 to 2023–24	2024–25	126	▼ –3	25.500	▼ –1.500
2015–16 to 2024–25	2025–26	141	▼ –15	23.000	▼ –2.500
2016–17 to 2025–26	2026–27	127	▲ +14	32.125	▲ +9.125
2017–18 to 2026–27	2027–28	108	▲ +19	33.625	▲ +1.500
