= 1978–79 NK Rijeka season =

Rijeka
1978–79 season
- Chairman: Zvonko Poščić
- Manager: Dragutin Spasojević
- First League: 10th
- Cup: Winners
- Cup Winners’ Cup: Round 2
- Balkans Cup: Winners
- Top goalscorer: League: Damir Desnica (7); All: Nikica Cukrov (9)
- Highest home attendance: 20,000 vs (Socialist Federal Republic of Yugoslavia) Partizan (16 May 1979 - Yugoslav Cup)
- Lowest home attendance: 2,000 vs (Socialist Federal Republic of Yugoslavia) Željezničar (17 June 1979 - Yugoslav First League)
- Average home league attendance: 6,765

The 1978–79 season was the 33rd season in Rijeka’s history and their 17th season in the Yugoslav First League. Their 5th place finish in the 1977–78 season meant it was their fifth successive season playing in the Yugoslav First League.

== Competitions ==
Competition	First match	Last match	Starting round	Final position	Record							
Competition	First match	Last match	Starting round	Final position	G	W	D	L	GF	GA	GD	Win %
Yugoslav First League	12 August 1978	17 June 1979	Matchday 1	10th	34	10	11	13	35	34	+1	29.41
Yugoslav Cup	30 August 1978	24 May 1979	First round	Winner	6	4	2	0	7	1	+6	66.67
European Cup Winners' Cup	13 September 1978	25 October 1978	First round	Second round	4	1	2	1	3	4	−1	25.00
Total					44	15	15	14	45	39	+6	34.09

=== Yugoslav First League ===
==== Classification ====
Pos	Team	Pld	W	D	L	GF	GA	GD	Pts	Qualification or relegation
8	Sloboda Tuzla	34	11	10	13	34	34	0	32	
9	Željezničar	34	14	4	16	45	52	−7	32	
10	Rijeka	34	10	11	13	35	34	+1	31	Qualification for Cup Winners' Cup first round
11	Borac Banja Luka	34	11	9	14	45	56	−11	31	
12	Vojvodina	34	11	7	16	35	38	−3	29	

Source: rsssf.org
Rules for classification: 1) points; 2) goal difference; 3) number of goals scored.

==== Results summary ====
Overall								Home						Away					
Pld	W	D	L	GF	GA	GD	Pts	W	D	L	GF	GA	GD	W	D	L	GF	GA	GD
34	10	11	13	35	34	+1	41	9	7	1	25	10	+15	1	4	12	10	24	−14

==== Results by round ====
Round	1	2	3	4	5	6	7	8	9	10	11	12	13	14	15	16	17	18	19	20	21	22	23	24	25	26	27	28	29	30	31	32	33	34
Ground	H	A	H	A	H	A	H	H	A	H	A	H	A	H	A	H	A	A	H	A	H	A	H	A	A	H	A	H	A	H	A	H	A	H
Result	W	D	W	D	D	L	D	W	W	D	L	W	L	D	L	D	L	L	D	D	D	L	W	L	L	W	L	W	D	W	L	L	L	W
Position	5	4	3	2	3	8	9	4	4	3	6	3	7	7	8	8	8	10	10	9	10	10	10	10	11	9	10	9	9	9	9	10	11	10

Source: Competitive matches
A = Away; H = Home; W = Win; D = Draw; L = Loss

== Matches ==
=== First League ===
Round	Date	Venue	Opponent	Score	Attendance	Rijeka Scorers
1	12 Aug	H	Dinamo Zagreb	2 – 1	8,000	Radin, Desnica
2	20 Aug	A	Radnički Niš	1 – 1	15,000	Desnica
3	23 Aug	H	Borac Banja Luka	2 – 0	7,000	Ružić, Hrstić
4	27 Aug	A	Osijek	0 – 0	12,000	
5	3 Sep	H	Velež	0 – 0	10,000	
6	10 Sep	A	Vojvodina	0 – 2	10,000	
7	17 Sep	H	OFK Beograd	0 – 0	5,000	
8	24 Sep	H	Sarajevo	5 – 2	7,000	Desnica (2, 1p), Fegic, Šestan, Cukrov
9	8 Oct	A	Zagreb	2 – 0	5,000	Hrstić, Bursać
10	14 Oct	H	Sloboda	0 – 0	5,000	
11	28 Oct	A	Partizan	0 – 1	15,000	
12	5 Nov	H	Red Star	1 – 0	15,000	Juričić
13	12 Nov	A	Budućnost	0 – 1	10,000	
14	19 Nov	H	Napredak Kruševac	1 – 1	3,000	Jerolimov
15	26 Nov	A	Olimpija	0 – 1	3,000	
16	29 Nov	H	Hajduk Split	2 – 2	8,000	Fegic, Mijač
17	3 Dec	A	Željezničar	0 – 1	5,000	
18	4 Mar	A	Dinamo Zagreb	0 – 1	40,000	
19	11 Mar	H	Radnički Niš	0 – 0	6,000	
20	18 Mar	A	Borac Banja Luka	2 – 2	4,000	Tomić, Šestan
21	25 Mar	H	Osijek	3 – 3	8,000	Radin (p), Cukrov, Ružić
22	8 Apr	A	Velež	1 – 3	6,000	Desnica
23	15 Apr	H	Vojvodina	3 – 0	5,000	Jerolimov, Bursać, Desnica
24	22 Apr	A	OFK Beograd	0 – 2	4,000	
25	29 Apr	A	Sarajevo	2 – 3	8,000	Tomić, Cukrov
26	6 May	H	Zagreb	2 – 0	6,000	Ružić, Desnica (p)
27	9 May	A	Sloboda	0 – 1	4,000	
28	13 May	H	Partizan	2 – 0	8,000	Tomić, Cukrov
29	20 May	A	Red Star	0 – 0	15,000	
30	27 May	H	Budućnost	1 – 0	8,000	Radin
31	31 May	A	Napredak Kruševac	1 – 3	8,000	Cukrov
32	3 Jun	H	Olimpija	0 – 1	4,000	
33	10 Jun	A	Hajduk Split	1 – 2	12,000	Machin
34	17 Jun	H	Željezničar	1 – 0	2,000	Hrstić

Source: rsssf.com

=== Yugoslav Cup ===
Round	Date	Venue	Opponent	Score	Attendance	Rijeka Scorers
R1	11 Oct	H	Borac Čačak	3 – 0	3,000	Cukrov (2), Mijač
R2	8 Nov	H	Istra	0 – 0 (4–3 p)	2,000	
QF	25 Feb	A	Radnički Niš	1 – 0	?	Tomić
SF	4 Apr	A	Red Star	1 – 0	10,000	Ružić
F	16 May	H	Partizan	2 – 1	20,000	Cukrov, Bursać
F	24 May	A	Partizan	0 – 0	55,000	

Source: rsssf.com

=== Cup Winners' Cup ===
Round	Date	Venue	Opponent	Score	Attendance	Rijeka Scorers
R1	13 Sep	H	Wrexham (Wales)	3 – 0	9,000	Tomić, Durkalić, Cukrov
R1	27 Sep	A	Wrexham (Wales)	0 – 2	10,469	
R2	18 Oct	H	Beveren (Belgium)	0 – 0	8,000	
R2	1 Nov	A	Beveren (Belgium)	0 – 2	15,000	

Source: worldfootball.net

=== Squad statistics ===
Competitive matches only.

Name	Apps	Goals	Apps	Goals	Apps	Goals	Apps	Goals
Name	League		Cup		Europe		Total	
(Socialist Federal Republic of Yugoslavia) Radojko Avramović	32+0	0	6+0	0	4+0	0	42	0
(Socialist Federal Republic of Yugoslavia) Sergio Machin	34+0	1	4+0	0	4+0	0	40	1
(Socialist Federal Republic of Yugoslavia) Nikica Cukrov	28+0	5	6+0	3	4+0	1	38	9
(Socialist Federal Republic of Yugoslavia) Savo Filipović	6+4	0	2+1	0	0+0	0	13	0
(Socialist Federal Republic of Yugoslavia) Zvjezdan Radin	30+0	3	6+0	0	4+0	0	40	3
(Socialist Federal Republic of Yugoslavia) Miloš Hrstić	31+0	3	5+1	0	4+0	0	41	3
(Socialist Federal Republic of Yugoslavia) Milan Ružić	32+0	3	5+0	1	4+0	0	41	4
(Socialist Federal Republic of Yugoslavia) Srećko Juričić	28+1	1	6+0	0	4+0	0	39	1
(Socialist Federal Republic of Yugoslavia) Milan Radović	5+0	0	0+0	0	0+0	0	5	0
(Socialist Federal Republic of Yugoslavia) Damir Desnica	28+1	7	3+1	0	4+0	0	37	7
(Socialist Federal Republic of Yugoslavia) Dragoljub Bursać	21+8	2	5+0	1	2+2	0	38	3
(Socialist Federal Republic of Yugoslavia) Salih Durkalić	9+0	0	1+0	0	2+0	1	12	1
(Socialist Federal Republic of Yugoslavia) Ivica Car	3+3	0	2+0	0	0+1	0	9	0
(Socialist Federal Republic of Yugoslavia) Željko Mijač	6+1	1	2+0	1	1+0	0	10	2
(Socialist Federal Republic of Yugoslavia) Ive Jerolimov	18+1	2	1+2	0	1+1	0	24	2
(Socialist Federal Republic of Yugoslavia) Miroslav Šugar	4+0	0	0+0	0	0+0	0	4	0
(Socialist Federal Republic of Yugoslavia) Zoran Šestan	3+10	2	0+0	0	0+0	0	13	2
(Socialist Federal Republic of Yugoslavia) Adriano Fegic	20+6	2	2+0	0	3+0	0	31	2
(Socialist Federal Republic of Yugoslavia) Edmond Tomić	19+12	3	5+1	1	3+0	1	40	5
(Socialist Federal Republic of Yugoslavia) Milan Bačvarević	7+3	0	0+1	0	0+0	0	11	0
(Socialist Federal Republic of Yugoslavia) Mauro Ravnić	2+1	0	0+0	0	0+0	0	3	0
(Socialist Federal Republic of Yugoslavia) Željko Belić	0+3	0	0+0	0	0+0	0	3	0
(Socialist Federal Republic of Yugoslavia) Danko Peranić	7+2	0	2+2	0	0+0	0	13	0
(Socialist Federal Republic of Yugoslavia) Miroslav Uljan	0+1	0	1+1	0	0+0	0	3	0
(Socialist Federal Republic of Yugoslavia) Edin Jasprica	2+2	0	2+0	0	0+0	0	6	0

== See also ==
- 1978–79 Yugoslav First League
- 1978–79 Yugoslav Cup
- 1978–79 European Cup Winners' Cup

== External sources ==
- 1978–79 Yugoslav First League at rsssf.com
- Prvenstvo 1978.-79. at nk-rijeka.hr
