= 1981–82 NK Rijeka season =

Rijeka
1981–82 season
- Chairman: Davor Sušanj
- Manager: Marijan Brnčić
- First League: 12th
- Cup: Round 2
- Top goalscorer: League: Edmond Tomić (10); All: Edmond Tomić (11)
- Highest home attendance: 15,000 vs (Socialist Federal Republic of Yugoslavia) Dinamo Zagreb (27 September 1981 - Yugoslav First League)
- Lowest home attendance: 1,000 vs (Socialist Federal Republic of Yugoslavia) Teteks (1 May 1982 - Yugoslav First League)
- Average home league attendance: 4,588

The 1981–82 season was the 36th season in Rijeka’s history and their 20th season in the Yugoslav First League. Their 7th place finish in the 1980–81 season meant it was their eighth successive season playing in the Yugoslav First League.

== Competitions ==
Competition	First match	Last match	Starting round	Final position	Record							
Competition	First match	Last match	Starting round	Final position	G	W	D	L	GF	GA	GD	Win %
Yugoslav First League	26 July 1981	1 May 1982	Matchday 1	12th	34	11	10	13	39	54	−15	32.35
Yugoslav Cup	7 October 1981	7 November 1981	First round	Second round	2	1	0	1	2	4	−2	50.00
Total					36	12	10	14	41	58	−17	33.33

=== Yugoslav First League ===
==== Classification ====
Pos	Team	Pld	W	D	L	GF	GA	GD	Pts
10	Vojvodina	34	12	8	14	48	48	0	32
11	Radnički Niš	34	12	8	14	37	44	−7	32
12	Rijeka	34	11	10	13	39	54	−15	32
13	Sloboda Tuzla	34	9	13	12	36	44	−8	31
14	Vardar	34	12	6	16	43	51	−8	30

Source: rsssf.org
Rules for classification: 1) points; 2) goal difference; 3) number of goals scored.

==== Results summary ====
Overall								Home						Away					
Pld	W	D	L	GF	GA	GD	Pts	W	D	L	GF	GA	GD	W	D	L	GF	GA	GD
34	11	10	13	39	54	−15	43	9	7	1	28	16	+12	2	3	12	11	38	−27

==== Results by round ====
Round	1	2	3	4	5	6	7	8	9	10	11	12	13	14	15	16	17	18	19	20	21	22	23	24	25	26	27	28	29	30	31	32	33	34
Ground	H	A	H	A	H	H	A	H	A	H	A	H	A	H	A	H	A	A	H	A	H	A	A	H	A	H	A	H	A	H	A	H	A	H
Result	W	D	D	L	W	W	L	W	W	D	L	D	W	D	L	L	L	L	W	D	W	L	L	D	L	W	L	W	D	W	L	D	L	D
Position	3	4	6	9	7	4	9	6	2	3	6	6	4	4	5	9	10	13	13	11	7	11	12	12	14	11	13	11	12	9	10	10	12	12

Source: Competitive matches
A = Away; H = Home; W = Win; D = Draw; L = Loss

== Matches ==
=== First League ===
Round	Date	Venue	Opponent	Score	Attendance	Rijeka Scorers
1	26 Jul	H	Sarajevo	2 – 1	3,000	Tomić, Hrstić
2	1 Aug	A	Zagreb	1 – 1	3,000	Marjanović
3	9 Aug	H	Vojvodina	1 – 1	4,000	Tomić
4	16 Aug	A	Partizan	0 – 1	10,000	
5	23 Aug	H	Radnički Niš	5 – 4	3,000	Desnica, Tomić (2), Fegic, Janjanin
6	29 Aug	H	Osijek	3 – 1	3,000	Desnica, Tomić (2)
7	12 Sep	A	Olimpija	0 – 3	1,500	
8	20 Sep	H	Vardar	1 – 0	3,000	Bursać
9	23 Sep	A	Željezničar	2 – 1	5,000	Tomić (2)
10	27 Sep	H	Dinamo Zagreb	2 – 2	15,000	Jerolimov, Bursać
11	4 Oct	A	Velež	1 – 4	3,000	Desnica
12	11 Oct	H	Budućnost	0 – 0	3,000	
13	24 Oct	A	OFK Beograd	1 – 0	800	Fegic
14	28 Oct	H	Red Star	0 – 0	9,000	
15	31 Oct	A	Hajduk Split	0 – 2	8,000	
16	3 Nov	H	Sloboda	0 – 1	2,000	
17	15 Nov	A	Teteks	1 – 2	2,000	Tomić
18	14 Feb	A	Sarajevo	1 – 6	10,000	Petrović
19	21 Feb	H	Zagreb	2 – 0	2,000	Bursać, Fegic
20	28 Feb	A	Vojvodina	1 – 1	7,000	Malbaša
21	7 Mar	H	Partizan	1 – 0	8,000	Fegic
22	10 Mar	A	Radnički Niš	0 – 1	8,000	
23	14 Mar	A	Osijek	0 – 4	3,000	
24	21 Mar	H	Olimpija	0 – 0	1,500	
25	24 Mar	A	Vardar	0 – 2	5,000	
26	28 Mar	H	Željezničar	3 – 1	2,000	Jerolimov, Fegic
27	31 Mar	A	Dinamo Zagreb	0 – 2	30,000	
28	3 Apr	H	Velež	3 – 2	2,000	Fegic, Tomić, Desnica
29	11 Apr	A	Budućnost	2 – 2	4,000	Gračan, Malbaša
30	14 Apr	H	OFK Beograd	2 – 0	1,500	Gračan, Desnica
31	17 Apr	A	Red Star	1 – 4	6,000	Desnica
32	25 Apr	H	Hajduk Split	1 – 1	14,000	Gračan
33	28 Apr	A	Sloboda	0 – 2	500	
34	1 May	H	Teteks	2 – 2	1,000	o.g., Gračan

Source: rsssf.com

=== Yugoslav Cup ===
Round	Date	Venue	Opponent	Score	Rijeka Scorers
R1	7 Oct	H	Priština	2 – 0	Belić, Tomić
R2	7 Nov	A	Olimpija	0 – 4	

Source: rsssf.com

=== Squad statistics ===
Competitive matches only.
Appearances in brackets indicate numbers of times the player came on as a substitute.

Name	Apps	Goals	Apps	Goals	Apps	Goals
Name	League		Cup		Total	
(Socialist Federal Republic of Yugoslavia) Neshat Zhavelli	25 (0)	0	2 (0)	0	27 (0)	0
(Socialist Federal Republic of Yugoslavia) Sergio Machin	12 (0)	0	0 (0)	0	12 (0)	0
(Socialist Federal Republic of Yugoslavia) Zvjezdan Radin	17 (0)	0	2 (0)	0	19 (0)	0
(Socialist Federal Republic of Yugoslavia) Nikola Marjanović	30 (1)	1	2 (0)	0	32 (1)	1
(Socialist Federal Republic of Yugoslavia) Miloš Hrstić	31 (0)	1	1 (0)	0	32 (0)	1
(Socialist Federal Republic of Yugoslavia) Milan Ružić	16 (0)	0	2 (0)	0	18 (0)	0
(Socialist Federal Republic of Yugoslavia) Damir Desnica	31 (1)	6	2 (0)	0	33 (1)	6
(Socialist Federal Republic of Yugoslavia) Željko Janjanin	9 (7)	1	1 (0)	0	10 (7)	1
(Socialist Federal Republic of Yugoslavia) Ive Jerolimov	31 (0)	2	1 (0)	0	32 (0)	2
(Socialist Federal Republic of Yugoslavia) Miroslav Šugar	31 (0)	0	2 (0)	0	33 (0)	0
(Socialist Federal Republic of Yugoslavia) Adriano Fegic	28 (4)	7	2 (0)	0	30 (4)	7
(Socialist Federal Republic of Yugoslavia) Edmond Tomić	24 (4)	10	2 (0)	1	26 (4)	11
(Socialist Federal Republic of Yugoslavia) Dragoljub Bursać	7 (5)	3	0 (0)	0	7 (5)	3
(Socialist Federal Republic of Yugoslavia) Milenko Lazović	12 (1)	0	0 (0)	0	12 (1)	0
(Socialist Federal Republic of Yugoslavia) Danko Peranić	12 (1)	0	1 (0)	0	13 (1)	0
(Socialist Federal Republic of Yugoslavia) Nenad Gračan	11 (1)	4	0 (0)	0	11 (1)	4
(Socialist Federal Republic of Yugoslavia) Nebojša Petrović	13 (3)	1	0 (1)	0	13 (4)	1
(Socialist Federal Republic of Yugoslavia) Zoran Šestan	1 (6)	0	1 (1)	0	2 (7)	0
(Socialist Federal Republic of Yugoslavia) Mladen Stipančić	3 (6)	0	0 (0)	0	3 (6)	0
(Socialist Federal Republic of Yugoslavia) Željko Nikolić	2 (2)	0	0 (0)	0	2 (2)	0
(Socialist Federal Republic of Yugoslavia) Nebojša Malbaša	14 (1)	2	0 (0)	0	14 (1)	2
(Socialist Federal Republic of Yugoslavia) Željko Belić	5 (7)	0	1 (1)	1	6 (8)	1
(Socialist Federal Republic of Yugoslavia) Miroslav Jelić	0 (3)	0	0 (0)	0	0 (3)	0
(Socialist Federal Republic of Yugoslavia) Rade Ljepojević	1 (0)	0	0 (0)	0	1 (0)	0
(Socialist Federal Republic of Yugoslavia) Branislav Petković	1 (5)	0	0 (0)	0	1 (5)	0
(Socialist Federal Republic of Yugoslavia) Milan Bačvarević	1 (3)	0	0 (1)	0	1 (4)	0
(Socialist Federal Republic of Yugoslavia) Mladen Mladenović	0 (2)	0	0 (0)	0	0 (2)	0
(Socialist Federal Republic of Yugoslavia) Vladimir Ćutuk	9 (2)	0	0 (0)	0	9 (2)	0

== See also ==
- 1981–82 Yugoslav First League
- 1981–82 Yugoslav Cup
