= 1982–83 NK Rijeka season =

Rijeka
1982–83 season
- Chairman: Davor Sušanj
- Manager: Marijan Brnčić, Josip Skoblar
- First League: 15th
- Cup: Semifinal
- Top goalscorer: League: Damir Desnica (11); All: Damir Desnica (13)
- Highest home attendance: 12,000 (4 times - Yugoslav First League)
- Lowest home attendance: 1,500 vs (Socialist Federal Republic of Yugoslavia) Željezničar (20 November 1982 - Yugoslav First League)
- Average home league attendance: 5,059

The 1982–83 season was the 37th season in Rijeka’s history and their 21st season in the Yugoslav First League. Their 12th place finish in the 1981–82 season meant it was their ninth successive season playing in the Yugoslav First League.

== Competitions ==
Competition	First match	Last match	Starting round	Final position	Record							
Competition	First match	Last match	Starting round	Final position	G	W	D	L	GF	GA	GD	Win %
Yugoslav First League	15 August 1982	26 June 1983	Matchday 1	15th	34	10	10	14	51	52	−1	29.41
Yugoslav Cup	26 October 1982	27 April 1983	First round	Semifinal	4	3	0	1	9	4	+5	75.00
Total					38	13	10	15	60	56	+4	34.21

=== Yugoslav First League ===
==== Classification ====
Pos	Team	Pld	W	D	L	GF	GA	GD	Pts	Qualification or relegation
13	Velež	34	11	9	14	54	57	−3	31	
14	Budućnost	34	11	9	14	39	52	−13	31	
15	Rijeka	34	10	10	14	51	52	−1	30	
16	Osijek	34	11	7	16	48	51	−3	29	
17	OFK Belgrade (R)	34	9	10	15	38	45	−7	28	Relegation to Yugoslav Second League

Source: rsssf.org
Rules for classification: 1) points; 2) goal difference; 3) number of goals scored.
(R) Relegated

==== Results summary ====
Overall								Home						Away					
Pld	W	D	L	GF	GA	GD	Pts	W	D	L	GF	GA	GD	W	D	L	GF	GA	GD
34	10	10	14	51	52	−1	40	9	6	2	33	18	+15	1	4	12	18	34	−16

==== Results by round ====
Round	1	2	3	4	5	6	7	8	9	10	11	12	13	14	15	16	17	18	19	20	21	22	23	24	25	26	27	28	29	30	31	32	33	34
Ground	A	H	A	H	A	H	A	A	H	A	H	A	H	A	H	A	H	H	A	H	A	H	A	H	H	A	H	A	H	A	H	A	H	A
Result	W	W	L	D	L	W	L	D	L	L	W	D	D	L	L	D	D	W	L	D	L	W	L	W	D	L	D	L	W	L	W	L	W	D
Position	1	2	4	4	8	5	6	6	11	14	10	9	12	14	15	14	15	12	15	16	16	14	15	14	14	16	16	16	16	16	15	15	15	15

Source: Competitive matches
A = Away; H = Home; W = Win; D = Draw; L = Loss

== Matches ==
=== First League ===
Round	Date	Venue	Opponent	Score	Attendance	Rijeka Scorers
1	15 Aug	A	Budućnost	5 – 1	4,000	Tomić (2), Desnica (2), Malbaša
2	22 Aug	H	Red Star	1 – 0	12,000	Desnica
3	29 Aug	A	Partizan	0 – 2	12,000	
4	1 Sep	H	Hajduk Split	1 – 1	12,000	Tomić
5	5 Sep	A	Velež	1 – 3	3,000	Lukić
6	12 Sep	H	Osijek	5 – 2	4,000	Lukić, Gračan, Malbaša, Desnica, Fegic
7	19 Sep	A	Sarajevo	1 – 2	8,000	Malbaša
8	26 Sep	A	Sloboda	1 – 1	4,000	Fegic
9	3 Oct	H	Vardar	1 – 2	3,000	Ćelović
10	7 Oct	A	Vojvodina	2 – 4	3,000	Desnica, Malbaša
11	17 Oct	H	Galenika	3 – 2	2,000	Tomić (2), Gračan
12	24 Oct	A	OFK Beograd	2 – 2	1,028	Desnica, Tomić
13	31 Oct	H	Radnički Niš	1 – 1	2,000	Fegic
14	7 Nov	A	Dinamo Vinkovci	1 – 3	2,000	Lukić
15	20 Nov	H	Željezničar	0 – 1	1,500	
16	28 Nov	A	Olimpija	1 – 1	1,000	Radin
17	5 Dec	H	Dinamo Zagreb	1 – 1	12,000	o.g.
18	6 Mar	H	Budućnost	2 – 0	4,000	Lukić, Desnica
19	13 Mar	A	Red Star	1 – 2	15,000	Desnica
20	20 Mar	H	Partizan	2 – 2	12,000	Gračan, Matrljan
21	27 Mar	A	Hajduk Split	0 – 1	8,000	
22	3 Apr	H	Velež	2 – 1	3,000	Ružić, Kustudić
23	10 Apr	A	Osijek	0 – 2	5,000	
24	13 Apr	H	Sarajevo	3 – 0	3,000	Milenković, Ćelović, Ružić
25	16 Apr	H	Sloboda	1 – 1	2,000	Matrljan
26	1 May	A	Vardar	0 – 1	5,000	
27	8 May	H	Vojvodina	0 – 0	3,000	
28	15 May	A	Galenika	1 – 3	1,500	Desnica
29	22 May	H	OFK Beograd	2 – 0	4,500	Gračan, Ružić
30	29 May	A	Radnički Niš	1 – 2	7,000	Malbaša
31	4 Jun	H	Dinamo Vinkovci	6 – 3	3,000	Matrljan (2), Gračan, Malbaša, Škerjanc, o.g.
32	12 Jun	A	Željezničar	0 – 3	1,500	
33	19 Jun	H	Olimpija	2 – 1	3,000	Desnica, Ružić
34	26 Jun	A	Dinamo Zagreb	1 – 1	15,000	Desnica

Source: rsssf.com

=== Yugoslav Cup ===
Round	Date	Venue	Opponent	Score	Rijeka Scorers
R1	26 Oct	A	Viko-Omladinac	4 – 0	Gračan, Desnica, Matrljan, Juričić
R2	10 Nov	A	Red Star	3 – 1	Lukić, Desnica, Gračan
QF	23 Mar	H	Vojvodina	1 – 0	o.g.
SF	27 Apr	H	Dinamo Zagreb	1 – 3	Lukić

Source: rsssf.com

=== Squad statistics ===
Competitive matches only.
Appearances in brackets indicate numbers of times the player came on as a substitute.

Name	Apps	Goals	Apps	Goals	Apps	Goals
Name	League		Cup		Total	
(Socialist Federal Republic of Yugoslavia) Mauro Ravnić	16 (0)	0	2 (0)	0	18 (0)	0
(Socialist Federal Republic of Yugoslavia) Nikica Milenković	32 (0)	1	4 (0)	0	36 (0)	1
(Socialist Federal Republic of Yugoslavia) Zvjezdan Radin	32 (0)	1	3 (0)	0	35 (0)	1
(Socialist Federal Republic of Yugoslavia) Nikola Marjanović	32 (0)	0	4 (0)	0	36 (0)	0
(Socialist Federal Republic of Yugoslavia) Feriz Ćelović	8 (14)	2	1 (1)	0	9 (15)	2
(Socialist Federal Republic of Yugoslavia) Srećko Juričić	32 (0)	0	4 (0)	1	36 (0)	1
(Socialist Federal Republic of Yugoslavia) Damir Desnica	32 (1)	11	3 (1)	2	35 (2)	13
(Socialist Federal Republic of Yugoslavia) Nenad Gračan	31 (0)	5	4 (0)	2	35 (0)	7
(Socialist Federal Republic of Yugoslavia) Adriano Fegic	15 (0)	3	2 (0)	0	17 (0)	3
(Socialist Federal Republic of Yugoslavia) Milan Ružić	17 (1)	4	2 (0)	0	19 (1)	4
(Socialist Federal Republic of Yugoslavia) Edmond Tomić	9 (3)	6	0 (0)	0	9 (3)	6
(Socialist Federal Republic of Yugoslavia) Duško Lukić	25 (3)	4	2 (0)	2	27 (3)	6
(Socialist Federal Republic of Yugoslavia) Danko Peranić	7 (1)	0	3 (0)	0	10 (1)	0
(Socialist Federal Republic of Yugoslavia) Danko Matrljan	11 (9)	4	2 (1)	1	13 (10)	5
(Socialist Federal Republic of Yugoslavia) Nebojša Malbaša	30 (1)	6	3 (1)	0	33 (2)	6
(Socialist Federal Republic of Yugoslavia) Zoran Šestan	13 (2)	0	0 (2)	0	13 (4)	0
(Socialist Federal Republic of Yugoslavia) Jovan Savić	8 (0)	0	1 (0)	0	9 (0)	0
(Socialist Federal Republic of Yugoslavia) Neshat Zhavelli	10 (0)	0	1 (0)	0	11 (0)	0
(Socialist Federal Republic of Yugoslavia) Mladen Stipančić	1 (2)	0	0 (0)	0	1 (2)	0
(Socialist Federal Republic of Yugoslavia) Boris Tičić	5 (2)	0	0 (0)	0	5 (2)	0
(Socialist Federal Republic of Yugoslavia) Robert Rubčić	0 (8)	0	1 (0)	0	1 (8)	0
(Socialist Federal Republic of Yugoslavia) Miodrag Kustudić	1 (2)	1	1 (0)	0	2 (2)	1
(Socialist Federal Republic of Yugoslavia) Rade Ljepojević	3 (3)	0	1 (0)	0	4 (3)	0
(Socialist Federal Republic of Yugoslavia) Zoran Mršić	1 (1)	0	0 (0)	0	1 (1)	0
(Socialist Federal Republic of Yugoslavia) Milan Bačvarević	0 (1)	0	0 (0)	0	0 (1)	0
(Socialist Federal Republic of Yugoslavia) Mladen Mladenović	0 (7)	0	0 (0)	0	0 (7)	0
(Socialist Federal Republic of Yugoslavia) Zoran Škerjanc	3 (3)	1	0 (0)	0	3 (3)	1

== See also ==
- 1982–83 Yugoslav First League
- 1982–83 Yugoslav Cup

== External sources ==
- 1982–83 Yugoslav First League at rsssf.com
- Prvenstvo 1982.-83. at nk-rijeka.hr
