= 1980–81 NK Rijeka season =

Rijeka
1980–81 season
- Chairman: Nikola Jurčević, Marijan Glavan
- Manager: Miroslav Blažević, Marijan Brnčić
- First League: 7th
- Cup: Round 1
- Top goalscorer: League: Milan Radović (26); All: Milan Radović (26)
- Highest home attendance: 13,000 vs (Socialist Federal Republic of Yugoslavia) Hajduk Split (10 June 1981 - Yugoslav First League)
- Lowest home attendance: 1,000 vs (Socialist Federal Republic of Yugoslavia) Sarajevo (7 December 1980 - Yugoslav First League)
- Average home league attendance: 5,059

The 1980–81 season was the 35th season in Rijeka’s history and their 19th season in the Yugoslav First League. Their 10th place finish in the 1979–80 season meant it was their seventh successive season playing in the Yugoslav First League.

== Competitions ==
Competition	First match	Last match	Starting round	Final position	Record							
Competition	First match	Last match	Starting round	Final position	G	W	D	L	GF	GA	GD	Win %
Yugoslav First League	16 August 1980	14 June 1981	Matchday 1	7th	34	12	10	12	50	47	+3	35.29
Yugoslav Cup	15 October 1980	15 October 1980	First round	First round	1	0	1	0	2	2	+0	0.00
Total					35	12	11	12	52	49	+3	34.29

=== Yugoslav First League ===
==== Classification ====
Pos	Team	Pld	W	D	L	GF	GA	GD	Pts	Qualification or relegation
5	Dinamo Zagreb	34	12	11	11	44	38	+6	35	
6	Budućnost	34	11	12	11	38	34	+4	34	Qualification for Intertoto Cup
7	Rijeka	34	12	10	12	50	47	+3	34	
8	Partizan	34	9	16	9	43	41	+2	34	
9	Velež	34	13	8	13	44	47	−3	34	Qualification for Cup Winners' Cup first round

Source: rsssf.org
Rules for classification: 1) points; 2) goal difference; 3) number of goals scored.

==== Results summary ====
Overall								Home						Away					
Pld	W	D	L	GF	GA	GD	Pts	W	D	L	GF	GA	GD	W	D	L	GF	GA	GD
34	12	10	12	50	47	+3	46	9	7	1	30	12	+18	3	3	11	20	35	−15

==== Results by round ====
Round	1	2	3	4	5	6	7	8	9	10	11	12	13	14	15	16	17	18	19	20	21	22	23	24	25	26	27	28	29	30	31	32	33	34
Ground	A	H	A	A	H	A	H	A	H	A	H	A	H	A	H	A	H	H	A	H	H	A	H	A	H	H	A	A	H	A	H	A	H	A
Result	D	W	W	L	W	W	L	L	D	L	W	L	D	L	W	L	W	D	L	D	W	L	D	L	W	D	W	W	W	D	D	L	D	L
Position	11	5	2	5	3	1	3	3	3	4	4	6	5	6	6	7	7	7	7	8	7	8	8	8	8	8	6	5	4	4	4	4	4	7

Source: Competitive matches
A = Away; H = Home; W = Win; D = Draw; L = Loss

== Matches ==
=== First League ===
Round	Date	Venue	Opponent	Score	Attendance	Rijeka Scorers
1	16 Aug	A	OFK Beograd	0 – 0	6,000	
2	24 Aug	H	Partizan	2 – 1	8,000	Fegic, Tomić
3	31 Aug	A	Zagreb	6 – 3	2,000	Ružić (3), Tomić, Radović (2)
4	7 Sep	A	Red Star	1 – 2	25,000	Radović
5	13 Sep	H	Radnički Niš	3 – 0	3,500	Janjanin, Radović, Tomić
6	21 Sep	A	Sloboda	3 – 1	6,000	Lukić (2), Hrstić
7	5 Oct	H	Borac Banja Luka	0 – 1	4,000	
8	8 Oct	A	Vardar	0 – 3^{1}	4,000	
9	12 Oct	H	Željezničar	1 – 1	3,000	Radović
10	19 Oct	A	Velež	3 – 4	3,000	Radović (3)
11	26 Oct	H	Dinamo Zagreb	3 – 0	10,000	Lukić, Hrstić, Radović
12	29 Oct	A	Vojvodina	1 – 2	5,000	Radović
13	2 Nov	H	Olimpija	1 – 1	5,000	Tomić
14	9 Nov	A	Budućnost	0 – 3	7,000	
15	23 Nov	H	Napredak Kruševac	1 – 0	3,000	Radović (p)
16	30 Nov	A	Hajduk Split	0 – 2	4,000	
17	7 Dec	H	Sarajevo	2 – 0	1,000	Radović, Jerolimov
18	1 Mar	H	OFK Beograd	0 – 0	5,000	
19	8 Mar	A	Partizan	0 – 1	25,000	
20	14 Mar	H	Zagreb	0 – 0	2,000	
21	22 Mar	H	Red Star	3 – 2	10,000	Radović (2), Machin
22	29 Mar	A	Radnički Niš	1 – 3	5,000	Radović (p)
23	5 Apr	H	Sloboda	1 – 1	4,000	Radović (p)
24	12 Apr	A	Borac Banja Luka	1 – 2	5,000	Radović
25	15 Apr	H	Vardar	3 – 1	3,000	Fegic, Radović (2, 1p)
26	18 Apr	A	Željezničar	0 – 0	2,000	
27	3 May	H	Velež	5 – 1	4,000	Radović (3), Jerolimov, Ružić
28	10 May	A	Dinamo Zagreb	2 – 1	15,000	Desnica (p), Radović
29	17 May	H	Vojvodina	3 – 1	4,000	Radović (2, 1p), Desnica
30	27 May	A	Olimpija	1 – 1	4,000	Desnica
31	31 May	H	Budućnost	0 – 0	3,000	
32	7 Jun	A	Napredak Kruševac	0 – 5	3,000	
33	10 Jun	H	Hajduk Split	2 – 2	13,000	Machin, Tomić
34	14 Jun	A	Sarajevo	1 – 2	6,000	Radović

Source: rsssf.com

=== Yugoslav Cup ===
Round	Date	Venue	Opponent	Score	Rijeka Scorers
R1	15 Oct	A	Partizan	2 – 2 (2–4 p)	Fegic (2)

Source: rsssf.com

=== Squad statistics ===
Competitive matches only.

Name	Apps	Goals	Apps	Goals	Apps	Goals
Name	League		Cup		Total	
(Socialist Federal Republic of Yugoslavia) Neshat Zhavelli	25+1	0	0+0	0	26	0
(Socialist Federal Republic of Yugoslavia) Sergio Machin	23+4	2	0+0	0	27	2
(Socialist Federal Republic of Yugoslavia) Nikola Marjanović	29+0	0	1+0	0	30	0
(Socialist Federal Republic of Yugoslavia) Miloš Hrstić	31+0	2	1+0	0	32	2
(Socialist Federal Republic of Yugoslavia) Milan Ružić	24+0	4	0+0	0	24	4
(Socialist Federal Republic of Yugoslavia) Srećko Juričić	30+0	0	1+0	0	31	0
(Socialist Federal Republic of Yugoslavia) Milan Radović	30+1	26	1+0	0	32	26
(Socialist Federal Republic of Yugoslavia) Damir Desnica	9+6	3	0+0	0	15	3
(Socialist Federal Republic of Yugoslavia) Željko Janjanin	18+4	1	1+0	0	23	1
(Socialist Federal Republic of Yugoslavia) Duško Lukić	28+0	3	1+0	0	29	3
(Socialist Federal Republic of Yugoslavia) Željko Mijač	1+8	0	0+0	0	9	0
(Socialist Federal Republic of Yugoslavia) Ive Jerolimov	32+0	2	1+0	0	33	2
(Socialist Federal Republic of Yugoslavia) Miroslav Šugar	26+0	0	1+0	0	27	0
(Socialist Federal Republic of Yugoslavia) Adriano Fegic	29+3	2	1+0	2	33	4
(Socialist Federal Republic of Yugoslavia) Edmond Tomić	15+9	5	0+0	0	24	5
(Socialist Federal Republic of Yugoslavia) Mauro Ravnić	9+1	0	1+0	0	11	0
(Socialist Federal Republic of Yugoslavia) Željko Maretić	2+4	0	0+1	0	7	0
(Socialist Federal Republic of Yugoslavia) Danko Peranić	8+4	0	0+0	0	12	0
(Socialist Federal Republic of Yugoslavia) Mirko Mijović	1+1	0	0+0	0	2	0
(Socialist Federal Republic of Yugoslavia) Nebojša Petrović	2+1	0	0+0	0	3	0
(Socialist Federal Republic of Yugoslavia) Zoran Šestan	2+5	0	0+1	0	8	0
(Socialist Federal Republic of Yugoslavia) Zoran Stojadinović	0+4	0	1+0	0	5	0
(Socialist Federal Republic of Yugoslavia) Miroslav Miljković	0+1	0	0+0	0	1	0

== Notes ==
1. Rijeka’s Milan Ružić was sent off when the result was 1–1. The referee abandoned the match following the scuffle that ensued. The match was voided and awarded 3–0 to Vardar. Ružić was suspended for six months.

== See also ==
- 1980–81 Yugoslav First League
- 1980–81 Yugoslav Cup

== External sources ==
- 1980–81 Yugoslav First League at rsssf.com
- Prvenstvo 1980.-81. at nk-rijeka.hr
