= Nikitović =

Nikitović (Serbian Cyrillic: Hикитoвић) is a Serbian surname that may refer to

- Aleksandar Nikitović (born 1979), Serbian basketball coach and former player
- Veljko Nikitović (born 1980), Serbian football player
- Vladimir Nikitović (born 1980), Serbian football defender
- Zoran Nikitovic (born 1957), Serbian association football goalkeeper
- Edvard Nikitovic (born 1973), Slovenian basketball player
