= 1978–79 Yugoslav Cup =

1978–79 Yugoslav Football Cup
31st Marshal Tito Cup

Tournament details
- Country: Yugoslavia

Final positions
- Champions: Rijeka (2nd title)
- Runners-up: Partizan

Tournament statistics
- Top goal scorer(s): Slobodan Santrač; Dušan Savić (4 goals each)

The 1978–79 Yugoslav Cup was the 31st season of the top football knockout competition in SFR Yugoslavia, the Yugoslav Cup (Serbo-Croatian: Kup Jugoslavije), also known as the "Marshal Tito Cup" (Kup Maršala Tita), since its establishment in 1946. It was won by NK Rijeka, who successfully managed to defend the title having won the 1977–78 Yugoslav Cup.

== Calendar ==
Round	Dates	Fixtures	Clubs
First round	30 August 1978	16	32 → 16
Second round	8 November 1978	8	16 → 8
Quarter-finals	25 February 1979	8	8 → 4
Semi-finals	5 April 1979	4	4 → 2
Final	16 and 24 May 1979	2	2 → 1

== First round ==
Tie no	Home team	Score	Away team
1	Radnički Kragujevac (II)	5–0	Osijek
2	Red Star	4–1	Budućnost
3	Partizan	5–1	OFK Beograd
4	Slaven Koprivnica (III)	1–1 (5–4 p)	Sloboda
5	Dinamo Zagreb	2–2 (2–5 p)	Velež
6	Čelik (II)	3–1	Vojvodina
7	Istra (III)	2–1	16th July Garrison (Niš)
8	Merkator Ljubljana (II)	2–2 (7–5 p)	Trepça (II)
9	Željezničar	4–0	Sarajevo
10	Hajduk Split	2–2 (7–8 p)	Proleter Zrenjanin (II)
11	Radnički Niš	3–1	Olimpija Ljubljana
12	Novi Sad (II)	2–0	Rudar Ljubija (II)
13	NK Zagreb	1–1 (1–4 p)	Borac Banja Luka
14	REMHK Kosovo (III)	0–0 (2–4 p)	Vardar (II)
15	Belišće (III)	1–2	Sutjeska (II)
16	Rijeka	3–0	Borac Čačak (II)

== Second round ==
Tie no	Home team	Score	Away team
1	Proleter Zrenjanin (II)	1–0	Čelik (II)
2	Sutjeska (II)	3–3 (7–8 p)	Red Star
3	Radnički Niš	1–0	Radnički Kragujevac (II)
4	Vardar (II)	1–1 (5–4 p)	Slaven Koprivnica (III)
5	Rijeka	0–0 (4–3 p)	Istra (III)
6	Novi Sad (II)	2–2 (7–5 p)	Željezničar
7	Velež	0–0 (11–12 p)	Partizan
8	Borac Banja Luka	2–1	Merkator Ljubljana (II)

== Quarter-finals ==
Tie no	Home team	Score	Away team
1	Proleter Zrenjanin (II)	2–2 (5–3 p)	Vardar (II)
2	Radnički Niš	0–1	Rijeka
3	Red Star	4–0	Novi Sad (II)
4	Borac Banja Luka	2–2 (4–6 p)	Partizan

== Semi-finals ==
4 April 1979

Red Star	0–1	Rijeka
		Ružić 2'

Red Star Stadium, Belgrade
Attendance: 10,000
Referee: Edvard Šoštarič (Maribor)
5 April 1979

Partizan	1–0	Proleter Zrenjanin
Jović 81'

Stadion JNA, Belgrade
Attendance: 5,000
Referee: Josip Glažar (Rijeka)

== Final ==
=== First leg ===
16 May 1979

Rijeka	2–1	Partizan
Cukrov 18'; Bursać 85'		Kozić 68'

Stadion Kantrida, Rijeka
Attendance: 20,000
Referee: Aleksandar Nikić (Ljubljana)

RIJEKA:
GK	1	(Socialist Federal Republic of Yugoslavia) Radojko Avramović
DF	2	(Socialist Federal Republic of Yugoslavia) Sava Filipović
DF	3	(Socialist Federal Republic of Yugoslavia) Miloš Hrstić
DF	4	(Socialist Federal Republic of Yugoslavia) Nikica Cukrov
DF	5	(Socialist Federal Republic of Yugoslavia) Zvjezdan Radin
MF	6	(Socialist Federal Republic of Yugoslavia) Srećko Juričić
MF	7	(Socialist Federal Republic of Yugoslavia) Dragoljub Bursać
MF	8	(Socialist Federal Republic of Yugoslavia) Sergio Machin	Substituted off
FW	9	(Socialist Federal Republic of Yugoslavia) Edmond Tomić
MF	10	(Socialist Federal Republic of Yugoslavia) Milan Ružić
MF	11	(Socialist Federal Republic of Yugoslavia) Edis Jasprica	Substituted off
Substitutes:
FW	?	(Socialist Federal Republic of Yugoslavia) Danko Peranić	Substituted on
MF	?	(Socialist Federal Republic of Yugoslavia) Ivo Jerolimov	Substituted on
Manager:
(Socialist Federal Republic of Yugoslavia) Marijan Brnčić

PARTIZAN:
GK	1	(Socialist Federal Republic of Yugoslavia) Rade Zalad
DF	2	(Socialist Federal Republic of Yugoslavia) Tomislav Kovačević
DF	3	(Socialist Federal Republic of Yugoslavia) Refik Kozić
MF	4	(Socialist Federal Republic of Yugoslavia) Rešad Kunovac
DF	5	(Socialist Federal Republic of Yugoslavia) Borislav Đurović
DF	6	(Socialist Federal Republic of Yugoslavia) Vladimir Lazičić
MF	7	(Socialist Federal Republic of Yugoslavia) Zvonko Živković
MF	8	(Socialist Federal Republic of Yugoslavia) Aleksandar Trifunović
MF	9	(Socialist Federal Republic of Yugoslavia) Aranđel Todorović	Substituted off
FW	10	(Socialist Federal Republic of Yugoslavia) Dževad Prekazi	Substituted off
MF	11	(Socialist Federal Republic of Yugoslavia) Nikica Klinčarski
Substitutes:
FW	?	(Socialist Federal Republic of Yugoslavia) Zvonko Varga	Substituted on
FW	?	(Socialist Federal Republic of Yugoslavia) Boško Đorđević	Substituted on
Manager:
(Socialist Federal Republic of Yugoslavia) Milutin Šoškić

=== Second leg ===
24 May 1979

Partizan	0–0	Rijeka

Red Star Stadium, Belgrade
Attendance: 55,000
Referee: Tome Manojlovski (Tetovo)

PARTIZAN:
GK	1	(Socialist Federal Republic of Yugoslavia) Zoran Nikitović
DF	2	(Socialist Federal Republic of Yugoslavia) Tomislav Kovačević
DF	3	(Socialist Federal Republic of Yugoslavia) Refik Kozić
MF	4	(Socialist Federal Republic of Yugoslavia) Rešad Kunovac	Substituted off
DF	5	(Socialist Federal Republic of Yugoslavia) Nenad Stojković
MF	6	(Socialist Federal Republic of Yugoslavia) Borislav Đurović
MF	7	(Socialist Federal Republic of Yugoslavia) Zvonko Živković
MF	8	(Socialist Federal Republic of Yugoslavia) Aleksandar Trifunović
FW	9	(Socialist Federal Republic of Yugoslavia) Slobodan Santrač	Substituted off
FW	10	(Socialist Federal Republic of Yugoslavia) Boško Đorđević
MF	11	(Socialist Federal Republic of Yugoslavia) Nikica Klinčarski
Substitutes:
FW	?	(Socialist Federal Republic of Yugoslavia) Dževad Prekazi	Substituted on
MF	?	(Socialist Federal Republic of Yugoslavia) Zvonko Varga	Substituted on
Manager:
(Socialist Federal Republic of Yugoslavia) Milutin Šoškić

RIJEKA:
GK	1	(Socialist Federal Republic of Yugoslavia) Radojko Avramović
DF	2	(Socialist Federal Republic of Yugoslavia) Sergio Machin
DF	3	(Socialist Federal Republic of Yugoslavia) Miloš Hrstić
DF	4	(Socialist Federal Republic of Yugoslavia) Nikica Cukrov
DF	5	(Socialist Federal Republic of Yugoslavia) Zvjezdan Radin
MF	6	(Socialist Federal Republic of Yugoslavia) Srećko Juričić
MF	7	(Socialist Federal Republic of Yugoslavia) Dragoljub Bursać
FW	8	(Socialist Federal Republic of Yugoslavia) Milan Radović	Substituted off
FW	9	(Socialist Federal Republic of Yugoslavia) Edmond Tomić
MF	10	(Socialist Federal Republic of Yugoslavia) Milan Ružić	Substituted off
FW	11	(Socialist Federal Republic of Yugoslavia) Damir Desnica
Substitutes:
MF	?	(Socialist Federal Republic of Yugoslavia) Adriano Fegic	Substituted on
MF	?	(Socialist Federal Republic of Yugoslavia) Milan Bačvarević	Substituted on
Manager:
(Socialist Federal Republic of Yugoslavia) Marijan Brnčić

== See also ==
- 1978–79 Yugoslav First League
