= Miloš Hrstić =

Croatian footballer (born 1955)

Personal information
- Date of birth: 20 November 1955 (age 70)
- Place of birth: Vojnić, FPR Yugoslavia
- Height: 1.85 m (6 ft 1 in)
- Position: Defender

Youth career
- 1968–1974: Rijeka

Senior career*
Years	Team	Apps	(Gls)
1975–1985	Rijeka	230	(10)
1985–1986	Deportivo La Coruña	27	(0)
1987–1988	Olimpija Ljubljana	32	(0)
Total		289	(10)

International career
1974–1978	Yugoslavia U21	36	(1)
1978–1982	Yugoslavia	10	(0)
1980	Yugoslavia Olympic	4	(0)

Managerial career
- 1988–1989: Orijent
- 1989–1990: Rijeka (youth)
- 1991–1993: Pazinka
- 1993–1994: Grobničan
- 1994–1995: Dhofar
- 1995–1997: East Riffa Club
- 1998: Sichuan Guancheng
- 1999: Al-Ittihad Kalba
- 2000: Sichuan Guancheng
- 2001–2002: Henan Construction
- 2003: Chongqing Lifan
- 2004–2005: East Riffa Club
- 2006: Hunan Shocking
- 2006–2007: Busaiteen Club
- 2008: Grobničan
- 2009: Dhofar
- 2010–2011: Hunan Billows F.C.
- 2012: Al Taawon FC
- 2013: Shaanxi Laochenggen
- 2017: Sichuan Longfor (reserves)
Medal record
Men's Football
Representing Yugoslavia
Gold medal – first place	UEFA U-21 Euro	1978
Gold medal – first place	Mediterranean Games	1979 Split
- * Club domestic league appearances and goals

Miloš Hrstić (born 20 November 1955) is a Croatian football coach and former player. During his club career he played for HNK Rijeka, Deportivo de La Coruña and Olimpija Ljubljana. He earned ten caps for the Yugoslavia national team, and participated in the 1982 FIFA World Cup.

== Playing career ==
=== Club ===
Miloš Hrstić was born in Vojnić. He started his senior career in Rijeka, where he passed all the young selections and was a member of all Yugoslavia youth team selections, from U15 to U21. First coach that put him in the team was Dragutin Spasojević, who was head of staff when Rijeka won their two National cups in 1978 and 1979. From 1978 to 1984 Rijeka was the best Croatian club in the Yugoslav First League. In 1979, he had the debut for Yugoslavia, in friendly match against Argentina (4-1 win).

In the European competitions from 1978 to 1984 Rijeka was undefeated on her own stadium Kantrida Wrexham A.F.C. 3–0, K.S.K. Beveren 0–0, K.F.C. Germinal Beerschot 2–1, FC Lokomotíva Košice 3–0, Juventus FC 0–0, Real Valladolid 4–1, Real Madrid C.F. 3-1. The only two team who managed to get a draw where Juventus and Beveren. In 1984, with coach Josip Skoblar, Olympique de Marseille best player of all times, they lost the Championship title in the last match against Red Star Belgrade, later winner of the UEFA Champions League.

=== International ===
Hrstić made his debut in a November 1978 Balkan Cup match against Greece and earned a total of 10 caps, scoring no goals. He also played in the 1979 game against Argentina in Belgrade which was Dragan Džajić's official retirement match. After that he played in the qualifiers for the 1982 FIFA World Cup in Spain and on the same World Cup where he played the first match against Northern Ireland, which proved to be his final international appearance.

== Coaching career ==
He started in the youth teams of Rijeka, coaching after that Croatian clubs Orijent, Pazinka, Grobničan. In 1994, he went to Oman as coach of Dhofar. With them he won the silver medal in the Gulf Club Champions Cup and then was called by Bahrein club East Riffa Club where he stayed two years. In 1998, he was signed by then called Sichuan Quanxing FC, Sichuan Guancheng, largest club in Sichuan province and achieved 3rd place in Chinese Super League. He changed many clubs in China, in FC Hunan Shoking, he settled the bases of their team, introduced the youth and nowadays they have the carriers of the clubs successes in Chinese Super League. His name and successes in China contributed that after five years away he again signed with Hunan Xiangtao FC, a new club founded in 2007. Every year they made a step ahead, winning the championship of China League Three and China League Two. Striving to win promotion to the Chinese Super League, and they hired Mr. Miloš as head coach who can put the foundations of the squad, introduce young players and at the same time make a good result.

== Career statistics ==
Appearances and goals by club, season and competition
Club	Season	League			Cup (Note: Includes Yugoslav Cup, Copa del Rey.)		Continental		Total	
Club	Season	Division	Apps	Goals	Apps	Goals	Apps	Goals	Apps	Goals
NK Rijeka	1975–76	Yugoslav First League	1	0	0	0			1	0
NK Rijeka	1976–77	Yugoslav First League	19	1	0	0			19	1
NK Rijeka	1977–78	Yugoslav First League	32	1	5	0			37	1
NK Rijeka	1978–79	Yugoslav First League	31	3	6	0	4	0	41	3
NK Rijeka	1979–80	Yugoslav First League	24	1	1	0	6	0	31	3
NK Rijeka	1980–81	Yugoslav First League	31	2	1	0			33	2
NK Rijeka	1981–82	Yugoslav First League	31	1	1	0			32	1
NK Rijeka	1982–83	Yugoslav First League	0	0	0	0			0	0
NK Rijeka	1983–84	Yugoslav First League	33	1	3	0			36	1
NK Rijeka	1984–85	Yugoslav First League	28	0	2	0	4	1	34	1
NK Rijeka	Total		230	10	19	0	14	1	263	11
Deportivo de La Coruña	1985–86	Segunda División	27	0	4	0	–		31	0
Deportivo de La Coruña	1986–87	Segunda División	0	0					0	0
Deportivo de La Coruña	Total		27	0	0	0	0	0	27	0
Olimpija Ljubljana	1987–88	Yugoslav Second League - West	32	0	0	0			32	0
Career total			289	10	23	0	14	2	326	11

== Honours ==
=== Player ===
NK Rijeka

- Yugoslav Cup: 1978, 1979
- Balkans Cup: 1978

Individual

- Player with most trophies and awards in NK Rijeka's history
- Most capped NK Rijeka player ever in Yugoslavia National team
- NK Rijeka player of the year: 1978, 1979, 1980, 1981, 1982

Yugoslavia

- UEFA European Under-21 Football Championship: 1978
- Mediterranean Games: Split 1979
- Olympic Games Fourth place: Moscow 1980

=== Manager ===
NK Pazinka

- Druga HNL - West: 1992

NK Grobničan

- 4. HNL - West: 2007–08

== Education ==
- Certificate Head Football Coach - Department for coach education, Institute of Kinesiology of the University of Zagreb
- Certificate UEFA PRO Licensed Coach - Croatian Football Federation
