= Srećko Juričić =

Croatian footballer (born 1954)

Personal information
- Full name: Srećko Juričić
- Date of birth: 30 December 1954 (age 71)
- Place of birth: Opatija, PR Croatia, Yugoslavia
- Position: Defender

Team information
- Current team: Rijeka (sporting director)

Senior career*
Years	Team	Apps	(Gls)
1972–1985	Rijeka	293	(5)
1985–1986	Winterslag	22	(1)

Managerial career
- 1990–1991: Koper
- 1991–1992: Primorje
- 1992: Rijeka
- 1993–1994: Rijeka
- 1994: Hit Gorica
- 1995: Istra
- 1995–1996: UAE (assistant)
- 1997: UAE U-20
- 1997–1998: Al-Riffa
- 1998–2002: Ittihad Kalba
- 1999: UAE
- 2002–2003: Al-Ahli Dubai
- 2003–2004: Bahrain
- 2005–2006: Oman
- 2006: Sharjah
- 2006: Al-Arabi
- 2007: Qatar SC
- 2007–2008: Al-Riffa
- 2008: Al Wasl FC
- 2009–2010: Yemen
- 2012: Al Taawoun
- 2013: Rijeka (interim)
- * Club domestic league appearances and goals

Srećko Juričić (born 30 December 1954) is a Croatian former professional footballer, who is currently the sporting director for HNK Rijeka. Juričić has also had a career as a manager coaching: HNK Rijeka, Koper, Primorje, HIT Gorica, Istra, Al-Riffa, Ittihad Kalba, Al-Ahli Dubai, Sharjah FC, Qatar SC, Al Wasl FC, Al Taawoun FC and internationally the UAE, UAE U-20, Bahrain, Oman and Yemen national teams.

== Playing career ==
=== Club ===
As a player, he was part of HNK Rijeka's golden generation which won the Yugoslav Cup in 1978 and 1979. He is also Rijeka's most capped player with 684 caps. Juričić has captained the team both against Juventus in 1980 and Real Madrid in 1984.

== Managerial career ==
In his managerial career he has led HNK Rijeka and Al-Ahli Dubai. Internationally he has coached the Bahrain national football team, Oman national football team, United Arab Emirates national football team and Yemen national football team. He then moved to coach the Bahrain Riffa Club.

As a manager Juričić led HNK Rijeka to the 1994 Croatian Cup Final where they lost to Croatia Zagreb.

On 4 October 2008, it was announced that Juričić has moved back to the UAE to coach Al Wasl FC.

In June 2009, he was appointed as manager of Yemen national football team. In December 2010, he was sacked after a string of poor results at the 20th Arabian Gulf Cup which Yemen hosted.

In March 2012, Juričić was appointed director of sports in his first club HNK Rijeka.

== Career statistics ==
=== Player statistics ===
Club performance			League		Cup		League Cup		Continental		Total	
Season	Club	League	Apps	Goals	Apps	Goals	Apps	Goals	Apps	Goals	Apps	Goals
Yugoslavia			League		Yugoslav Cup		Balkans Cup		Europe		Total	
1972–73	NK Rijeka	Yugoslav Second League	–	0	–		–		–		–	0
1973–74	NK Rijeka	Yugoslav Second League	–	2	–		–		–		–	2
1974–75	NK Rijeka	Yugoslav First League	30	0	0	0	–		3 (Note: Appearances in Mitropa Cup)	0	33	0
1975–76	NK Rijeka	Yugoslav First League	32	2	1	0	–		–		33	2
1976–77	NK Rijeka	Yugoslav First League	34	0	2	0	–		–		36	0
1977–78	NK Rijeka	Yugoslav First League	33	0	5	0	6	0	6 (Note: Appearances in Intertoto Cup)	0	47	0
1978–79	NK Rijeka	Yugoslav First League	29	1	6	0	4	0	4 (Note: Appearances in European Cup Winners' Cup)	0	43	1
1979–80	NK Rijeka	Yugoslav First League	32	0	1	0	2	0	6	0	41	0
1980–81	NK Rijeka	Yugoslav First League	30	0	1	0	–		–		31	0
1981–82	NK Rijeka	Yugoslav First League	–		–		–		–		0	0
1982–83	NK Rijeka	Yugoslav First League	32	0	4	1	–		–		36	1
1983–84	NK Rijeka	Yugoslav First League	26	0	3	0	–		–		29	0
1984–85	NK Rijeka	Yugoslav First League	15	0	2	0	–		4 (Note: Appearances in UEFA Cup)	0	21	0
Belgium			League		Belgian Cup		League Cup		Europe		Total	
1985–86	KFC Winterslag	Belgian Second Division	22	1	0	0	-	-	–		22	1
Total	Yugoslavia		293	5	25	1	12	0	23	0	353	6
Total	Belgium		22	1	0	0	0	0	0	0	22	1

Notes

Source
Srečko Juričić statistics, NK Rijeka Seasons

=== Managerial statistics ===
As of 2 November 2018

Team	From	To	Record				
Team	From	To	G	W	D	L	Win %
Primorje Ajdovščina	1 July 1991	30 June 1992	43	14	11	18	32.56
NK Rijeka	15 November 1992	5 December 1992	2	1	1	0	50.00
NK Rijeka	4 January 1993	30 June 1994	59	24	25	10	40.68
ND Hit Gorica	1 July 1994	31 September 1994	6	1	2	3	16.67
NK Istra	16, Apr, 1995	24 Sep 1995	18	4	7	7	22.22
Riffa SC	1 July 1997	31 June 1998	22	18	3	1	81.82
Al-Ittihad Kalba SC	1 July 1998	1 June 2002	131	48	28	55	36.64
UAE U-20	27 January 1997	24 June 1997	4	1	0	3	25.00
UAE	12 September 1999	22 December 1999	4	1	2	1	25.00
Al-Ahli Dubai	1 June 2002	30 June 2003	31	14	10	7	45.16
Bahrain	1 July 2003	30 June 2004	20	9	6	5	45.00
Oman	1 July 2005	30 June 2006	11	4	2	5	36.36
Sharjah FC	1 July 2006	1 November 2006	5	1	2	2	20.00
Al-Arabi	1 November 2006	31 December 2006	8	1	2	5	12.50
Qatar SC	1 Jan 2007	30 Jun 2007	14	5	1	8	35.71
Riffa SC	1 Jul 2007	31 Dec 2007	8	6	2	0	75.00
Al-Wasl F.C.	4 October 2008	1 December 2008	9	2	4	3	22.22
Yemen	1 June 2009	1 December 2010	13	5	2	6	38.46
Al Taawoun	1 January 2012	1 February 2012	3	0	2	1	0.00
HNK Rijeka	3 March 2013	3 March 2013	1	0	1	0	0.00
Total			412	159	113	140	38.59

== Honours ==
=== Player ===
NK Rijeka

- Yugoslav Cup: 1978, 1979
- Balkans Cup: 1978
- Yugoslav Second League: 1973–74

Individual

- NK Rijeka all time XI

=== Manager ===
NK Primorje Ajdovščina

- MNZ Nova Gorica Cup: 1991–92

Riffa SC

- Bahraini Premier League: 1997–98
- Bahraini King's Cup: 1998

Al-Ittihad Kalba SC

- UAE Division One: 1998–99

Al-Ahli Dubai

- UAE President's Cup: 2002

Bahrain

- Arabian Gulf Cup Silver Medal: 2003

Sporting positions
Preceded by Milan Máčala	Oman national football team manager 2005–2006	Succeeded by Milan Máčala
