= Edmond Tomić =

Yugoslav footballer

Personal information
- Full name: Edmond Tomić
- Date of birth: 10 November 1956 (age 69)
- Place of birth: Prizren, PR Serbia, FPR Yugoslavia
- Position: Forward

Senior career*
Years	Team	Apps	(Gls)
1975–1978	Liria Prizren	95	(48)
1978–1984	Rijeka	129	(35)
1984–1987	SV Spittal/Drau	24	(7)
1988–1991	Salzburg	32	(16)
1991–1992	SV Bad Ischl		
1992–1994	Union Mondsee		

International career
1977	Yugoslavia (amateurs)		
- * Club domestic league appearances and goals

Edmond Tomić (Albanian: Edmond Tomiç; born 10 November 1956 in Prizren, SR Serbia, SFR Yugoslavia) is a former football player.

== Career ==
Starting his career with Liria Prizren, where he played for three seasons, he moved to HNK Rijeka where he stayed for six seasons. He was Rijeka's top scorer during the 1981-82 season of Yugoslav First League. During his time with Rijeka, he was at the centre of controversy when Rijeka defeated Dinamo Zagreb 2–1 during the 1978–79 Yugoslav First League season. Dinamo claimed that Edmond Tomić, who joined Rijeka that season from Liria, didn't serve a one-match suspension following two yellow cards received while playing for his former club. They appealed and after two months it has been decided to award the match 3–0 to Dinamo. After several appeals from both sides, in spring 1979 Football Association of Yugoslavia ruled in favour of Rijeka. The case was brought to Employment Appeal Tribunal, which four years later ruled Dinamo as champions but HNK Hajduk Split remained registered as champions for the 1978-79 season. In 1984, he moved to Austria, where he played for various clubs, including SV Spittal/Drau and FC Salzburg until he retired.

== Personal life ==
Tomić was born in Prizren to an Albanian mother from Albania while his father was from Krushefc near Prizren.

== Club statistics ==
*Incomplete

Season	Club	League	League		Cup		Europe		Total	
Season	Club	League	Apps	Goals	Apps	Goals	Apps	Goals	Apps	Goals
1977–78	Liria Prizren	Yugoslav Second League (East)	30	24	–		–		30	24
1978–79	NK Rijeka	Yugoslav First League	31	3	6	1	3	1	40	5
1979–80	NK Rijeka	Yugoslav First League	26	8	1	1	5	0	32	9
1980–81	NK Rijeka	Yugoslav First League	24	5	0	0	–		24	5
1981–82	NK Rijeka	Yugoslav First League	28	10	2	1	–		30	11
1982–83	NK Rijeka	Yugoslav First League	12	6	0	0	–		18	6
1983–84	NK Rijeka	Yugoslav First League	8	3	0	0	–		8	3
NK Rijeka total			129	35	9	3	8	1	146	39

== Honours ==
NK Rijeka

- Yugoslav Cup: 1979
- Balkans Cup: 1978

FC Salzburg

- Regionalliga West: 1989-90

Individual

- Austrian Football First League top scorer: 1989
