= Malbaša =

Malbaša (Serbian: Малбаша) is a Serbian surname. Notable people with the surname include:

- Nebojša Malbaša (born 1959), Serbian footballer and manager
- Nikola Malbaša (born 1977), Serbian footballer
