= Damir Desnica =

Croatian footballer

Personal information
- Date of birth: 20 December 1956 (age 69)
- Place of birth: Obrovac, FPR Yugoslavia
- Position: Forward

Youth career
- 1972: Elektroprimorje
- 1972–1973: Konstruktor
- 1973–1974: Rijeka

Senior career*
Years	Team	Apps	(Gls)
1974–1985	Rijeka	251	(54)
1985–1990	Kortrijk	109	(19)
1990–1991	Zadar		
1991	Orijent		
1992–1993	Pazinka	11	(1)
–1996	Halubjan		
1996–1997	Klana		
1997–1998	Lučki Radnik		

International career
1978	Yugoslavia	1	(1)
Medal record
Representing Yugoslavia
Gold medal – first place	UEFA U-21 Euro	1978
- * Club domestic league appearances and goals

Damir Desnica (born 20 December 1956) is a Croatian and Yugoslav retired footballer who played as a forward. Born deaf, Desnica spent the majority of his career in the 1970s and 1980s with Rijeka, winning two Yugoslav Cup titles (1978, 1979) and one Balkans Cup (1978).

Playing primarily as a left winger for Rijeka, Desnica was known for his pace and dribbling ability. He is remembered as a key figure during the club's successful period in the late 1970s. Desnica earned one senior international cap for Yugoslavia in 1978 and won a bronze medal with the Yugoslav deaf football team at the 1973 International Silent Games in Sweden.

Later in his career, he spent five years with Kortrijk in Belgium. After returning to Croatia in 1990, he continued to play for smaller clubs, helping NK Zadar win the Yugoslav third-tier title in 1991. Following Croatia's independence and the establishment of a new league system, he joined second-tier club NK Pazinka and was part of their promotion-winning squad in 1992.

== Club career ==
Born in Obrovac, Croatia, Socialist Federal Republic of Yugoslavia, Desnica spent the major part of his career with Rijeka, appearing in nearly 300 official games and winning two Yugoslav Cups. In 1985, aged nearly 29, he moved abroad, signing for Belgian club Kortrijk.

Desnica returned to his country after five years and joined NK Zadar. After a brief spell with NK Orijent, he signed with NK Pazinka. He retired at the age of 41 after representing NK Halubjan, NK Klana, and NK Lučki Radnik in the Rijeka area.

== International career ==
Desnica earned one senior cap for the Yugoslavia. He scored in a 2–3 away loss against Romania in a UEFA Euro 1980 qualifiers match on 25 October 1978.

== Personal life ==
Desnica was one of the few deaf individuals to play football professionally, communicating solely through sign language. On 7 November 1984, during a match against Real Madrid at the Santiago Bernabéu Stadium as part of the 1984–85 UEFA Cup season. He was sent off from the game for two bookable offences by referee Roger Schoeters. The second yellow card was allegedly for protesting. Rijeka finished the match with eight players and lost the tie 3–4 on aggregate.

== Career statistics ==
Appearances and goals by club, season and competition
Club	Season	League			Cup		Continental		Total	
Club	Season	Division	Apps	Goals	Apps	Goals	Apps	Goals	Apps	Goals
Rijeka	1974–75	Yugoslav First League	3	0	–		–		3	0
Rijeka	1975–76	Yugoslav First League	23	5	–		–		23	5
Rijeka	1976–77	Yugoslav First League	9	0	–		–		9	0
Rijeka	1977–78	Yugoslav First League	31	4	5	1	–		36	5
Rijeka	1978–79	Yugoslav First League	29	7	4	0	4	0	37	7
Rijeka	1979–80	Yugoslav First League	13	1	1	0	4	3	18	4
Rijeka	1980–81	Yugoslav First League	15	3	–		–		15	3
Rijeka	1981–82	Yugoslav First League	32	6	2	0	–		34	6
Rijeka	1982–83	Yugoslav First League	33	11	4	2	–		37	13
Rijeka	1983–84	Yugoslav First League	32	11	3	1	–		35	12
Rijeka	1984–85	Yugoslav First League	31	6	2	1	4	1	37	8
Rijeka	Total		251	54	21	5	12	4	284	63
Kortrijk	1985–86	Belgian Pro League	30	6	?		–		30	6
Kortrijk	1986–87	Belgian Pro League	27	4	?		–		27	4
Kortrijk	1987–88	Belgian Pro League	32	8	?		–		32	8
Kortrijk	1988–89	Belgian Pro League	18	1	?		–		18	1
Kortrijk	1989–90	Belgian Pro League	2	0	?		–		2	0
Kortrijk	Total		109	19	?	4	0	0	109	23
Career total			360	73	21	9	12	4	393	86

== Honours ==
Rijeka

- Yugoslav Cup: 1977–78, 1978–79
- Balkans Cup: 1978

Zadar

- Yugoslav Inter-Republic League (West): 1990–91

Pazinka

- Croatian Second Football League (West): 1992
