= Robert Juričko =

Croatian footballer (born 1959)

Personal information
- Full name: Robert Juričko
- Date of birth: 27 September 1959 (age 67)
- Place of birth: Split, FPR Yugoslavia
- Height: 6 ft 1 in (1.85 m)
- Position: Defender

Senior career*
Years	Team	Apps	(Gls)
1977–1980	Hajduk Split	14	(0)
1980–1981	Napredak Kruševac	20	(0)
1981–1983	Solin	26	(1)

International career
1979	Yugoslavia U-20		
- * Club domestic league appearances and goals

Robert Juričko (born September 27, 1959) is a retired Croatian footballer.

Born in Split, SR Croatia, he played in the Yugoslav First League with NK Hajduk Split and FK Napredak Kruševac.
