= Adriano Fegic =

Slovenian footballer

Personal information
- Date of birth: 16 September 1956 (age 70)
- Place of birth: Postojna, PR Slovenia, FPR Yugoslavia
- Height: 1.82 m (6 ft 0 in)
- Position: Striker

Senior career*
Years	Team	Apps	(Gls)
–1977	Primorje		
1977–1985	Rijeka	160	(36)
1985–1986	Nancy	35	(8)
1986–1987	Limoges	33	(13)
1987–1989	Dunkerque	61	(25)
1989–19??	Valence		
1993–1996	Primorje	72	(14)

Managerial career
- Primorje
- * Club domestic league appearances and goals

Adriano Fegic (born 16 September 1956) is a Slovenian retired footballer who played as a striker.

== Club career ==
Fegic played for HNK Rijeka in the Yugoslav First League from 1977 to 1985. In 1984–85, he was the club's top scorer. He scored four goals in the 1984–85 UEFA Cup, including a brace against both Real Valladolid and Real Madrid.

== Honours ==
Rijeka

- Yugoslav Cup
  - Winner (2): 1978, 1979
- Balkans Cup
  - Winner (1): 1978
  - Runner-up (1): 1979

Primorje

- Slovenian Cup
  - Runner-up (1): 1995-96

== Club statistics ==
Rijeka only.

Club	Season	League			Cup		Europe		Total	
Club	Season	Division	Apps	Goals	Apps	Goals	Apps	Goals	Apps	Goals
Rijeka	1977–78	Yugoslav First League	2	1	–		–		2	1
Rijeka	1978–79	Yugoslav First League	26	2	2	0	3	0	31	2
Rijeka	1979–80	Yugoslav First League	11	1	–		1	0	31	2
Rijeka	1980–81	Yugoslav First League	32	2	1	2	–		33	4
Rijeka	1981–82	Yugoslav First League	32	7	2	0	–		34	7
Rijeka	1982–83	Yugoslav First League	15	3	2	0	–		17	3
Rijeka	1983–84	Yugoslav First League	18	9	1	0	–		19	9
Rijeka	1984–85	Yugoslav First League	24	11	2	0	4	4	30	15
Rijeka total			160	36	10	2	8	4	178	42

== Personal life ==
His daughter Nuša is a handball player.
