= Dragoljub Bursać =

Serbian footballer

Personal information
- Full name: Dragoljub Bursać
- Place of birth: Nakovo, SFR Yugoslavia
- Position: Midfielder

Youth career
- Polet Nakovo

Senior career*
Years	Team	Apps	(Gls)
1975–1978	Proleter Zrenjanin	52	(5)
1978–1982	Rijeka	51	(7)
1982–1983	Sutjeska Nikšić	32	(8)
1983	OFK Beograd	2	(0)
1984	OFK Kikinda	10	(1)
- * Club domestic league appearances and goals

Dragoljub Bursać (Serbian Cyrillic: Драгољуб Бурсаћ) is a retired Serbian football player.

== Biography ==
Born in Nakovo, Bursać started his career in his local club Polet. In 1975, he moved to Proleter Zrenjanin in the Yugoslav Second League, where he played for three seasons. In 1978, he moved to Rijeka in the Yugoslav First League and was part of the Rijeka team that won the 1978–79 Yugoslav Cup. He scored the winning goal in the 2–1 win in the first leg of the Cup Final against Partizan on 16 May 1979. In the following season, he was a regular in Rijeka's team that went on to reach the Quarter-finals of the 1979–80 European Cup Winners' Cup, where they were eliminated by Juventus. Following three seasons with Rijeka, prior to retiring, Bursać played with Sutjeska Nikšić, OFK Beograd and OFK Kikinda in the Yugoslav Second League.
