= Milan Ružić =

Croatian footballer

Personal information
- Date of birth: 25 July 1955
- Place of birth: Rijeka, FPR Yugoslavia
- Date of death: 25 January 2014 (aged 58)
- Place of death: Rijeka, Croatia
- Position: Midfielder

Youth career
- NK Kraljevica
- Crikvenica
- Rijeka

Senior career*
Years	Team	Apps	(Gls)
1976–1983	Rijeka	176	(18)
1983–1984	Beringen	22	(2)
1984–1988	AA Gent	114	(14)
1988–1989	Harelbeke	22	(3)
1989–1990	Hoek		
Total		374	(115)

International career^{‡}
1983	Yugoslavia	2	(0)
- * Club domestic league appearances and goals as of 28 May 2010 ‡ National team caps and goals as of 28 May 2010

Milan Ružić (25 July 1955 in Rijeka, Yugoslavia – 25 January 2014 in Rijeka, Croatia) was a Croatian football player. He was capped twice for Yugoslavia.

== Club career ==
He scored 31 goals in 430 appearances for hometown club Rijeka and also played in Belgium.

== International career ==
Ružić made his debut for Yugoslavia in a March 1983 friendly match away against Romania and earned a total of 2 caps, scoring no goals. His second and final international was a June 1983 friendly against West Germany.

== Death and legacy ==
He died in January 2014 after a long and serious illness.

NK Kraljevica changed the name of their stadium Oštro to Stadium Milan Ružić - Minta in his honour in August 2015.

== Career statistics ==
=== Club ===
Appearances and goals by club, season and competition
Club	Season	League			Cup		League Cup		Continental		Total	
Club	Season	Division	Apps	Goals	Apps	Goals	Apps	Goals	Apps	Goals	Apps	Goals
Yugoslavia		League			Yugoslav Cup		Other		Europe		Total	
NK Rijeka	1976-77	Yugoslav First League	29	2	2	0	–	–	–	–	31	2
NK Rijeka	1977-78	Yugoslav First League	29	0	4	1	–	–	–	–	33	1
NK Rijeka	1978-79	Yugoslav First League	32	3	5	1	–	–	4	0	41	4
NK Rijeka	1979-80	Yugoslav First League	26	5	0	0	–	–	6	0	32	5
NK Rijeka	1980-81	Yugoslav First League	24	4	0	0	–	–	-	-	28	4
NK Rijeka	1981-82	Yugoslav First League	16	0	2	0	–	–	-	-	18	0
NK Rijeka	1982-83	Yugoslav First League	18	4	2	0	–	–	-	-	20	4
NK Rijeka	1983-84	Yugoslav First League	1	0	-	-	–	–	-	-	1	0
Belgium		League			Belgian Cup		Other		Europe		Total	
K. Beringen	1983-84	First Division	22	2	2	0	–	–	–	–	24	2
K.A.A. Gent	1984-85	First Division	28	5	3	1	–	–	1	0	32	6
K.A.A. Gent	1985-86	First Division	32	5	4	1	–	–	–	–	36	6
K.A.A. Gent	1986-87	First Division	24	1	0	0	–	–	5	0	29	1
K.A.A. Gent	1987-88	First Division	30	2	1	0	–	–	–	–	31	2
K.R.C. Harelbeke	1988-89	Second Division	22	3	2	0	–	–	–	–	24	3
Netherlands		League			KNVB Cup		Other		Europe		Total	
HSV Hoek	1989-90	Hoofdklasse	-	-	-	-	–	–	–	–	0	0
Career total			333	36	27	4	0	0	16	0	376	40

== Honours ==
NK Rijeka

- Yugoslav Cup: 1978, 1979
- Balkans Cup: 1978

Individual

- Best NK Rijeka player 1978-79, 1980-81, 1982-83
- NK Rijeka best left midfielder of all time
- Scorer of the 2500 goal of the Yugoslav First League
- HNK Rijeka all time XI by Novi list
