= Zoran Nikitović =

Serbian footballer

Personal information
- Date of birth: 5 December 1957 (age 68)
- Place of birth: Komarnica, Yugoslavia
- Position: Goalkeeper

Senior career*
Years	Team	Apps	(Gls)
1974–1978	Sutjeska Nikšić		
1978–1981	Partizan	6	(0)
1981–1984	Budućnost Titograd	8	(0)
1983–1984	→ OFK Titograd (loan)	21	(0)
1985–1986	Napredak Kruševac	27	(0)
1986–1989	Footscray JUST	95	(2)

International career
1975	Yugoslavia U-18	2	(0)
1976	Yugoslavia U-21	1	(0)
- * Club domestic league appearances and goals

Zoran Nikitovic (born 5 December 1957) is a Serbian retired association football (soccer) goalkeeper.

== Career ==
Born in Komarnica, Nikitovic started playing with FK Sutjeska Nikšić where he played between 1974 and 1978 in the Yugoslav Second League. Then he signed with Yugoslav giants FK Partizan where he played three seasons as reserve goalkeeper, having played a total of 37 games, 6 of which in the Yugoslav First League. In 1981, he joined another First League club, FK Budućnost Titograd. He played with Budućnost the 1981–82, the first half of the 1982–83 and 1983–84 seasons, while he spent the second half of the 1982–83 and first half of the 1984–85 on loan at Second League playing with OFK Titograd. During the winter-break of the 1984–85 season, he left Budućnost and signed with Second League side FK Napredak Kruševac where he played the following one and a half years. He then moved abroad to Australia in summer 1986 and played in the defunct National Soccer League for Footscray JUST as the club's primary goalkeeper for the 1986 to 1989 seasons, He got to be known for being one of the few goalkeepers in Australian competitive association football who have scored.

Nikitović represented Yugoslavia at U-18 and U-21 levels in 1974 and 1975 respectively.
