= Duško Lukić =

Footballer

Personal information
- Full name: Dušan Lukić
- Date of birth: 7 November 1956 (age 69)
- Place of birth: Brčko, SFR Yugoslavia
- Position: Forward

Senior career*
Years	Team	Apps	(Gls)
1975–1976	Jedinstvo Brčko	28	(4)
1976–1979	Red Star Belgrade	63	(2)
1979–1984	Rijeka	99	(15)
1984–1987	Kortrijk	65	(23)
- * Club domestic league appearances and goals

Dušan "Duško" Lukić (Serbian Cyrillic: Душан "Душко" Лукић; born 7 November 1956) is a former Yugoslav, Bosnian Serb, football forward from the late 1970s and the 1980s.

== Club career ==
Born in Brčko, SR Bosnia and Herzegovina, back then within Yugoslavia, Lukić played for FK Jedinstvo Brčko, Red Star Belgrade and HNK Rijeka in Yugoslavia and KV Kortrijk in Belgium.
