= Ive Jerolimov =

Croatian footballer (born 1958)

Personal information
- Date of birth: 30 March 1958 (age 68)
- Place of birth: Preko, FPR Yugoslavia
- Positions: Defender; midfielder

Youth career
- NK Nehaj

Senior career*
Years	Team	Apps	(Gls)
1978–1982	Rijeka	106	(7)
1982–1987	Hajduk Split	71	(12)
1987–1989	Cercle Brugge	27	(6)
Total		202	(25)

International career
1980–1982	Yugoslavia	6	(0)
- * Club domestic league appearances and goals

Ive Jerolimov (born 30 March 1958) is a Croatian former professional footballer who played as a defender or midfielder.

== Club career ==
Jerolimov was born in Preko near Zadar. During his club career he played for HNK Rijeka, Hajduk Split and Cercle Brugge.

== International career ==
Jerolimov made his debut for Yugoslavia in a September 1980 World Cup qualification match against Denmark and earned a total of six caps. He was a non-playing member of their squad at the 1982 FIFA World Cup. His final international was a November 1982 European Championship qualification match away against Bulgaria.

== Career statistics ==
=== Club ===
Appearances and goals by club, season and competition
Club	Season	League			National cup (Note: Includes Yugoslav Cup, Belgian Cup)		Continental		Total	
Club	Season	Division	Apps	Goals	Apps	Goals	Apps	Goals	Apps	Goals
NK Rijeka	1978-79	Yugoslav First League	19	2	3	0	2	0	24	2
NK Rijeka	1979–80	Yugoslav First League	24	1	0	0	2	0	26	1
NK Rijeka	1980–81	Yugoslav First League	32	2	1	0	–		33	2
NK Rijeka	1981–82	Yugoslav First League	31	2	1	0	–		32	2
NK Rijeka	Total		106	7	5	0	4	0	115	7
Hajduk Split	1982–83	Yugoslav First League	16	4	2	2	4	3	22	10
Hajduk Split	1983–84	Yugoslav First League	19	4	4	2	5	0	28	6
Hajduk Split	1984–85	Yugoslav First League	1	0	0	0	0	0	1	0
Hajduk Split	1985–86	Yugoslav First League	15	1	1	0	7	0	23	1
Hajduk Split	1986–87	Yugoslav First League	18	3	3	0	5	2	26	5
Hajduk Split	Total		69	11	10	4	21	5	100	20
Cercle Brugge	1987–88	First Division	14	4	2	1	–		16	5
Cercle Brugge	1988–89	First Division	13	2	1	0	–		14	2
Cercle Brugge	Total		27	6	3	1	0	0	30	7
Career total			202	24	18	5	25	5	245	34

=== International ===
Appearances and goals by national team and year
National team	Year	Apps	Goals
Yugoslavia	1980	2	0
Yugoslavia	1981	3	0
Yugoslavia	1982	1	0
Total		6	0

== Honours ==
NK Rijeka

- Yugoslav Cup: 1979

Hajduk Split

- Yugoslav Cup: 1984, 1987
