= Nikola Marjanović (footballer, born 1955) =

Serbian footballer

Personal information
- Date of birth: 1 August 1957 (age 69)
- Place of birth: Belgrade, Yugoslavia
- Position: Defender

Youth career
- –1972: Čukarički
- 1972–1977: Red Star Belgrade

Senior career*
Years	Team	Apps	(Gls)
1977–1978	Čukarički		
1978–1980	Galenika	31	(1)
1980–1984	Rijeka	123	(1)
1984–1985	Partizan	20	(0)
1985–1986	Vojvodina	16	(0)
1986–1987	Mladost Petrinja		
1987–1991	Degerfors		

Managerial career
- 2000: Čukarički
- 2016-2018: Dolina Padina
- * Club domestic league appearances and goals as of 13:51, 20 December 2013 (UTC)

Nikola Marjanović (born 1 August 1957) is a Serbian retired football defender. He spent eight years of his professional career playing in the Yugoslav First League, collecting 190 appearances. In 1987, he moved to Sweden, where he played with Degerfors until he retired in the early 1990s.
