= Nikica Cukrov =

Croatian footballer and manager

Personal information
- Full name: Nikica Cukrov
- Date of birth: 6 March 1954 (age 72)
- Place of birth: Šibenik, FPR Yugoslavia
- Position: Midfielder

Senior career*
Years	Team	Apps	(Gls)
1971–1975	Šibenik		
1975–1979	Rijeka	135	(11)
1980–1985	Hajduk Split	90	(3)
1985–1986	Toulon	17	(2)
1986–1990	Šibenik		

International career
1977–1983	Yugoslavia	14	(0)

Managerial career
- 1990–1992: Šibenik
- 1999–2000: Zadar
- 2013–2014: Šibenik
Medal record
Men's football
Representing Yugoslavia
Mediterranean Games
Gold medal – first place	1979 Split	Team
- * Club domestic league appearances and goals

Nikica Cukrov (born 6 March 1954) is a Croatian professional football manager and retired player.

== International career ==
He made his debut for Yugoslavia in a November 1977 Balkan Cup friendly match against Greece, coming on as a 69th-minute substitute for Momčilo Vukotić, and earned a total of 14 caps scoring no goals. His final international was an October 1983 friendly match away against Switzerland.

== Personal life ==
Cukrov was diagnosed with cancer in 2014, which forced him to retire from managing Šibenik. Fortunately he recovered and worked as a scout for football in his county.
