= Zvjezdan Radin =

Croatian footballer

Personal information
- Full name: Zvjezdan Radin
- Date of birth: 28 October 1953 (age 73)
- Place of birth: Rijeka, PR Croatia, FPR Yugoslavia
- Position: Defender

Youth career
- Rijeka

Senior career*
Years	Team	Apps	(Gls)
1972–1984	Rijeka	242	(7)
1984–1985	Kickers Offenbach	12	(1)
1985–1986	Zadar	17	(0)
1986–1988	NK Lučki Radnik		
Total		271	(8)

Managerial career
- 1990–1992: Rijeka U-21 (Assistant)
- 1994–1995: Rijeka
- * Club domestic league appearances and goals

Zvjezdan Radin (born 28 October 1953) is a Croatian retired football player and manager.

== Career ==
As a player, he was part of NK Rijeka's golden generation which won the Yugoslav Cup in 1978 and 1979. He was a defender and is the second most capped Rijeka player of all time with 621 appearances in all competitions. He also scored 15 goals during his time in Rijeka as he was a prolific free kick taker. Although one of Rijeka's most talented players, he never made an appearance in the Yugoslavia national team due to biases in favour of players from the "big four" (Red Star Belgrade, Partizan Belgrade, Dinamo Zagreb and Hajduk Split). Radin also played abroad in Germany with 2. Bundesliga club Kickers Offenbach in the 1984–85 season.

After retiring as a player at the age of 38, Radin became a coach and has managed HNK Rijeka during the 1994–95 season. Currently, he is the head of Rijeka's youth school.

== Honours ==
NK Rijeka

- Yugoslav Cup: 1978, 1979
- Balkans Cup: 1978

Individual

- NK Rijeka's all time XI by: Novi list: 2011

== Career statistics ==
=== As a player ===
Club performance			League		Cup		League Cup		Continental		Total	
Season	Club	League	Apps	Goals	Apps	Goals	Apps	Goals	Apps	Goals	Apps	Goals
Yugoslavia			League		Yugoslav Cup		League Cup		Europe		Total	
1974-75	NK Rijeka	Yugoslav First League	16	0	0	0	–	–	-	-	16	0
1975-76	NK Rijeka	Yugoslav First League	34	1	1	0	–	–	-	-	35	1
1976-77	NK Rijeka	Yugoslav First League	34	1	2	0	–	–	-	-	36	1
1977-78	NK Rijeka	Yugoslav First League	31	1	5	0	–	–	-	-	36	1
1978-79	NK Rijeka	Yugoslav First League	30	3	6	0	–	–	4	0	40	3
1979-80	NK Rijeka	Yugoslav First League	16	0	1	0	–	–	5	0	22	0
1980-81	NK Rijeka	Yugoslav First League	0	0	0	0	–	–	-	-	0	0
1981-82	NK Rijeka	Yugoslav First League	17	0	2	0	–	–	-	-	19	0
1982-83	NK Rijeka	Yugoslav First League	32	1	3	0	–	–	-	-	35	1
1983-84	NK Rijeka	Yugoslav First League	32	0	3	0	–	–	-	-	35	0
Germany			League		DFB-Pokal		League Cup		Europe		Total	
1984-85	Kickers Offenbach	2. Bundesliga	12	1	0	0	–	–	-	-	12	1
Yugoslavia			League		Yugoslav Cup		League Cup		Europe		Total	
1985-86	NK Zadar	Yugoslav Second League - West	17	0	-	-	–	–	-	-	17	0
Total	Yugoslavia		259	7	23	0	0	0	9	0	291	7
Total	Germany		12	1	0	0	0	0	0	0	12	1
Total			271	8	23	0	0	0	9	0	303	8

=== Managerial statistics ===
As of 23 May 2018

Team	From	To	Record				
Team	From	To	G	W	D	L	Win %
NK Rijeka	June 1994	March 1995	22	10	4	8	45.45
