= 1978–79 Yugoslav First League =

1. Federal League
- Season: 1978–79
- Dates: 12 August 1978 – 17 June 1979
- Champions: Hajduk Split (9th Yugoslav championship) (7th Federal League title)
- Relegated: NK Zagreb (17th); OFK Beograd (18th)
- European Cup: Hajduk Split
- Cup Winners' Cup: Rijeka
- UEFA Cup: Dinamo Zagreb; Red Star
- Matches: 272
- Goals: 761 (2.8 per match)
- Top goalscorer: Dušan Savić (24)

The 1978–79 Yugoslav First League season was the 33rd season of the First Federal League (Serbo-Croatian: Prva savezna liga), the top level association football competition of SFR Yugoslavia, since its establishment in 1946. Hajduk Split won the league title.

A total of 18 teams competed in the league, with the defending champions Partizan nearly relegated, finishing the season in 15th place, one point above the relegation zone. Hajduk Split and Dinamo Zagreb both finished the season equal on 50 points, but Hajduk won the championship due to better goal difference.

The season began on 12 August 1978 and concluded on 17 June 1979. This was the third and last national title win for Hajduk under the guidance of manager Tomislav Ivić, who previously led the club to four consecutive Yugoslav Cup wins in 1972, 1973, 1974 and 1976 (not contested in 1975). Striker Dušan Savić of Red Star won the Golden Boot with 24 goals scored, his second, having previously topped the scoring table four years earlier in the 1974–75 season.

Rijeka, which finished 10th in the league, defeated Partizan in the final of the 1978–79 Marshal Tito Cup under the guidance of Marijan Brnčić, and qualified for the 1979–80 European Cup Winners' Cup.

Other standout players this season were Hajduk's Vedran Rožić, Mišo Krstičević, and Slaviša Žungul, Dinamo Zagreb's forwards Snješko Cerin and Zlatko Kranjčar, Sarajevo's attacking midfielders Safet Sušić and Srebrenko Repčić, the Velež stalwart Vahid Halilhodžić.

The season was marked by controversy after Rijeka's 2–1 win over Dinamo at Kantrida in the first round. Dinamo claimed that Rijeka's player Edmond Tomić, who had joined the club in pre-season from Lirija Prizren, should have served a one-match suspension for two yellow cards received while playing for his former club. They appealed to the Football Association of Yugoslavia (FSJ), which after two months of deliberation decided to award the match 3–0 to Dinamo. After more appeals and counter-appeals from both Rijeka and Dinamo, in the spring of 1979 FSJ ruled in favor of Rijeka. The case was then brought to the Employment Appeal Tribunal, which four years later ruled Dinamo as champions.

== Teams ==
A total of eighteen teams contested the league, including sixteen sides from the 1977–78 season and two sides promoted from the 1977–78 Yugoslav Second League (YSL) as winners of the two second level divisions East and West. The league was contested in a double round robin format, with each club playing every other club twice, for a total of 34 rounds. Two points were awarded for wins and one point for draws.

Čelik Zenica and Trepča Kosovska Mitrovica were relegated from the 1977–78 Yugoslav First League after finishing the season in bottom two places of the league table. The two clubs promoted to top level were Napredak Kruševac and Željezničar Sarajevo.

Locations of teams' home cities in the 1978–79 Yugoslav First League

Team	Location	Federal Republic	Position in 1977–78
Borac Banja Luka	Banja Luka	SR Bosnia and Herzegovina	12th
Budućnost	Titograd	SR Montenegro	11th
Dinamo Zagreb	Zagreb	SR Croatia	4th
Hajduk Split	Split	SR Croatia	3rd
Napredak Kruševac	Kruševac	SR Serbia	—N/a
OFK Belgrade	Belgrade	SR Serbia	16th
Olimpija Ljubljana	Ljubljana	SR Slovenia	10th
Osijek	Osijek	SR Croatia	13th
Partizan	Belgrade	SR Serbia	1st
Radnički Niš	Niš	SR Serbia	14th
Red Star	Belgrade	SR Serbia	2nd
Rijeka	Rijeka	SR Croatia	5th
Sarajevo	Sarajevo	SR Bosnia and Herzegovina	9th
Sloboda	Tuzla	SR Bosnia and Herzegovina	6th
Velež	Mostar	SR Bosnia and Herzegovina	7th
Vojvodina	Novi Sad	SR Serbia	8th
NK Zagreb	Zagreb	SR Croatia	15th
Željezničar	Sarajevo	SR Bosnia and Herzegovina	—N/a

== League table ==
Pos	Team	Pld	W	D	L	GF	GA	GD	Pts	Qualification or relegation
1	Hajduk Split (C)	34	20	10	4	62	28	+34	50	Qualification for European Cup first round
2	Dinamo Zagreb	34	21	8	5	67	38	+29	50	Qualification for UEFA Cup first round
3	Red Star Belgrade	34	16	9	9	51	33	+18	41	Qualification for UEFA Cup first round
4	Sarajevo	34	17	5	12	56	53	+3	39	
5	Velež	34	15	8	11	50	41	+9	38	
6	Budućnost	34	15	8	11	33	36	−3	38	
7	Radnički Niš	34	11	13	10	38	34	+4	35	
8	Sloboda Tuzla	34	11	10	13	34	34	0	32	
9	Željezničar	34	14	4	16	45	52	−7	32	
10	Rijeka	34	10	11	13	35	34	+1	31	Qualification for Cup Winners' Cup first round
11	Borac Banja Luka	34	11	9	14	45	56	−11	31	
12	Vojvodina	34	11	7	16	35	38	−3	29	
13	Osijek	34	8	13	13	32	39	−7	29	
14	Napredak Kruševac	34	9	11	14	43	51	−8	29	
15	Partizan	34	9	11	14	39	47	−8	29	
16	Olimpija	34	11	7	16	34	53	−19	29	
17	NK Zagreb (R)	34	8	12	14	32	39	−7	28	Relegation to Yugoslav Second League
18	OFK Belgrade (R)	34	5	12	17	30	55	−25	22	Relegation to Yugoslav Second League

Source: rsssf.org
Rules for classification: 1) points; 2) goal difference; 3) number of goals scored.
(C) Champions; (R) Relegated

== Results ==
Home \ Away	BBL	BUD	DIN	HAJ	NAP	OFK	OLI	OSI	PAR	RNI	RSB	RIJ	SAR	SLO	VEL	VOJ	ZAG	ŽEL
Borac Banja Luka		2–0	2–2	3–2	1–2	2–1	4–0	1–0	0–0	1–1	2–1	2–2	1–1	2–1	3–0	2–0	3–0	3–0
Budućnost	1–0		3–2	2–1	3–2	1–0	0–0	1–0	1–0	1–0	0–0	1–0	1–4	0–0	1–0	1–0	2–1	2–1
Dinamo Zagreb	4–0	3–0		2–2	4–0	3–0	1–1	2–1	1–0	3–1	2–2	1–0	2–1	2–0	3–1	2–0	3–2	2–1
Hajduk Split	3–1	1–0	1–2		4–0	3–0	3–0	1–0	2–0	2–1	1–0	2–1	5–0	1–1	3–0	2–0	1–0	3–2
Napredak Kruševac	4–1	1–2	2–2	0–0		2–3	1–0	1–1	2–2	4–1	0–1	3–1	0–0	2–2	3–1	2–0	3–0	0–1
OFK Belgrade	1–1	1–1	2–3	0–0	0–0		2–2	0–1	2–1	1–1	2–4	2–0	3–0	0–2	0–1	0–0	0–0	1–2
Olimpija	2–2	0–1	3–2	1–2	3–0	1–0		1–1	2–4	1–0	0–2	1–0	3–1	1–0	2–3	3–1	1–0	2–1
Osijek	2–2	1–1	1–2	1–1	1–0	1–1	3–0		1–1	1–1	2–2	0–0	0–1	2–0	2–0	2–0	1–0	2–0
Partizan	3–0	4–2	3–3	2–2	0–3	0–1	2–1	0–0		0–1	1–3	1–0	1–1	3–1	2–1	3–0	0–0	0–2
Radnički Niš	4–0	1–1	2–1	0–2	3–0	4–2	0–0	1–0	0–0		1–1	1–1	2–0	1–0	2–2	2–0	1–1	1–0
Red Star	1–0	1–0	1–2	1–3	3–3	5–1	3–1	1–1	3–0	2–1		0–0	0–1	3–2	1–0	1–0	2–0	5–2
Rijeka	2–0	1–0	2–1	2–2	1–1	0–0	0–1	3–2	2–0	0–0	1–0		5–2	0–0	0–0	3–0	2–0	1–0
Sarajevo	5–1	1–0	0–1	1–2	3–1	5–0	3–0	2–0	2–1	2–1	0–0	3–2		2–1	2–1	3–2	1–1	2–0
Sloboda Tuzla	1–0	2–1	2–0	1–2	0–0	0–0	4–0	1–0	0–1	1–1	1–0	1–0	5–0		1–1	1–0	0–0	3–1
Velež	4–1	2–2	0–0	1–0	4–0	2–0	2–1	1–0	4–1	3–1	2–1	3–1	1–0	0–0		1–1	1–0	5–2
Vojvodina	1–0	1–0	0–1	0–0	1–0	1–0	0–0	7–0	1–1	0–0	1–0	2–0	3–4	5–0	2–1		0–0	2–0
NK Zagreb	2–2	3–0	2–2	1–1	1–0	3–3	3–0	2–0	1–0	0–1	0–0	0–2	3–1	2–0	2–2	1–0		1–2
Željezničar	3–0	1–1	0–1	2–2	1–1	3–1	2–0	2–1	2–2	1–0	0–1	1–0	4–2	1–0	1–0	2–4	2–1	

Source: DataSoccer.it
Legend: Blue = home team win; Yellow = draw; Red = away team win.

== Winning squad ==
Champions: Hajduk Split
Player	League	
Player	Matches	Goals
Boriša Đorđević	32	4
Šime Luketin	32	3
Vedran Rožić	32	
Mišo Krstičević	31	8
Boro Primorac	30	
Luka Peruzović	30	
Dražen Mužinić	29	
Ivica Šurjak	27	6
Zlatko Vujović	25	9
Nenad Šalov	25	1
Ivan Budinčević	21	
Zoran Vujović	18	4
Slaviša Žungul	17	12
Davor Čop	16	2
Mićun Jovanić	16	2
Špiro Ćosić	11	
Damir Maričić	9	
Ivica Matković	4	
Mario Boljat	3	1
Robert Juričko	2	
Milorad Nižetić	2	
Marijan Zovko	1	
Ivan Gudelj	1	
Ivan Katalinić	1	
Head coach: Tomislav Ivić

== Top scorers ==
Rank	Player	Club	Goals
1	(Socialist Federal Republic of Yugoslavia) Dušan Savić	Red Star	24
2	(Socialist Federal Republic of Yugoslavia) Vahid Halilhodžić	Velež	16
3	(Socialist Federal Republic of Yugoslavia) Safet Sušić	Sarajevo	15
4	(Socialist Federal Republic of Yugoslavia) Slobodan Santrač	Partizan	14
5	(Socialist Federal Republic of Yugoslavia) Snješko Cerin	Dinamo Zagreb	13
5	(Socialist Federal Republic of Yugoslavia) Abid Kovačević	Borac Banja Luka	13
5	(Socialist Federal Republic of Yugoslavia) Zlatko Kranjčar	Dinamo Zagreb	13
5	(Socialist Federal Republic of Yugoslavia) Ivan Lukačević	Osijek	13
9	(Socialist Federal Republic of Yugoslavia) Muhamed Ibrahimbegović	Borac Banja Luka	12
9	(Socialist Federal Republic of Yugoslavia) Vladimir Jocić	Radnički Niš	12
9	(Socialist Federal Republic of Yugoslavia) Miloš Kostić	OFK Belgrade	12
9	(Socialist Federal Republic of Yugoslavia) Srebrenko Repčić	Sarajevo	12
9	(Socialist Federal Republic of Yugoslavia) Slaviša Žungul	Hajduk Split	12

== See also ==
- 1978–79 Yugoslav Second League
- 1978–79 Yugoslav Cup
- 1978–79 NK Hajduk Split season
