= List of Fehérvár FC seasons =

Fehérvár Football Club is a professional Hungarian football club based in Székesfehérvár, Hungary.

== Key ==
Nemzeti Bajnokság I

- Pld = Matches played
- W = Matches won
- D = Matches drawn
- L = Matches lost
- GF = Goals for
- GA = Goals against
- Pts = Points
- Pos = Final position

Hungarian football league system

- NBI = Nemzeti Bajnokság I
- NBII = Nemzeti Bajnokság II
- NBIII = Nemzeti Bajnokság III
- MBI = Megyei Bajnokság I

Magyar Kupa

- F = Final
- SF = Semi-finals
- QF = Quarter-finals
- R16 = Round of 16
- R32 = Round of 32
- R64 = Round of 64
- R128 = Round of 128

UEFA

- F = Final
- SF = Semi-finals
- QF = Quarter-finals
- Group = Group stage
- PO = Play-offs
- QR3 = Third qualifying round
- QR2 = Second qualifying round
- QR1 = First qualifying round
- PR = Preliminary round

Winners	Runners-up	Third	Promoted	Relegated

== Seasons ==
As of 24 May 2025.

Season		League									Cup	UEFA		Manager	Ref.
Season	Tier	Div.	Pld	W	D	L	GF	GA	Pts.	Pos.	Cup	Competition	Result	Manager	Ref.
1964	2	NBII	30	8	14	8	38	37	30	6th					
1965	2	NBII	30	9	9	12	39	34	27	12th		Did not qualify			
1966	2	NBII	30	10	7	13	38	37	27	11th		Did not qualify			
1967	2	NBII ↑	34	20	6	8	60	31	46	2nd		Did not qualify			
1968	1	NBI ↓	30	9	3	18	28	57	21	15th	?	Did not qualify		(Hungary) Németh	
1969	2	NBII ↑	34	24	3	7	92	46	51	1st		Did not qualify			
1970	1	NBI	14	3	2	9	16	28	8	11th	R32	Did not qualify			
1970–71	1	NBI	30	9	12	9	29	33	33	10th		Did not qualify		(Hungary) Kovács	
1971–72	1	NBI	30	13	5	12	47	43	31	7th	?	Did not qualify		(Hungary) (Czechoslovakia) Kalocsay	
1972–73	1	NBI	30	15	5	10	46	39	35	5th	SF	Did not qualify		(Hungary) Kovács	
1973–74	1	NBI	30	15	7	8	39	31	37	4th	R32	Did not qualify		(Hungary) Kovács	
1974–75	1	NBI	28	9	10	9	35	40	28	5th	?	UEFA Cup	1R	(Hungary) Kovács	
1975–76	1	NBI	30	18	8	4	61	26	44	2nd	?	Did not qualify		(Hungary) Kovács	
1976–77	1	NBI	34	14	7	13	60	46	35	6th	?	UEFA Cup	3R	(Hungary) Kovács	
1977–78	1	NBI	34	17	11	6	77	46	45	9th	?	Did not qualify		(Hungary) Lantos	
1978–79	1	NBI	34	12	10	12	46	49	34	9th	?	Did not qualify		(Hungary) Lantos	
1979–80	1	NBI	34	18	7	9	65	45	43	4th	?	Did not qualify		(Hungary) Lantos	
1980–81	1	NBI	34	19	6	9	60	38	44	4th	R32	Did not qualify		(Hungary) Verebes	
1981–82	1	NBI	34	18	5	11	49	44	41	4th	R	UEFA Cup	1R	(Hungary) Szentmihályi	
1982–83	1	NBI	30	11	3	16	48	47	25	13th	R32	Did not qualify		(Hungary) Molnár	
1983–84	1	NBI	30	16	5	9	47	31	37	3rd	R32	Did not qualify		(Hungary) Kovács	
1984–85	1	NBI	30	14	8	8	43	28	36	3rd	R64	UEFA Cup	R	(Hungary) Kovács	
1985–86	1	NBI	30	10	12	8	25	24	32	6th	R16	UEFA Cup	2R	(Hungary) Kovács	
1986–87	1	NBI	30	7	9	14	26	37	23	14th	?	Did not qualify		(Hungary) Tajti	
1987–88	1	NBI	30	6	15	9	28	32	27	11th	QF	Did not qualify		(Hungary) Kovács	
1988–89	1	NBI	30	17	5	8	57	32	57	4th	R16	Did not qualify		(Hungary) Kaszás	
1989–90	1	NBI	30	9	11	10	26	30	38	9th	R16	UEFA Cup	1R	(Hungary) Kaszás, (Hungary) Mezey	
1990–91	1	NBI	30	11	9	11	39	41	30	8th	R16	Did not qualify		(Hungary) Burcsa	
1991–92	1	NBI	30	10	12	8	45	40	32	7th	R32	Did not qualify		(Hungary) Burcsa	
1992–93	1	NBI	30	15	5	10	42	34	35	6th	R16	Did not qualify		(Hungary) Hartyáni	
1993–94	1	NBI	30	8	9	13	33	46	25	9th	R16	Did not qualify		(Romania) Jenei, (Hungary) Kiss	
1994–95	1	NBI	30	9	7	14	44	50	34	14th	?	Did not qualify		(Hungary) Szabó	
1995–96	1	NBI	30	8	7	15	38	54	31	13th	R16	Did not qualify		(Hungary) Csongrádi	
1996–97	1	NBI	34	10	12	12	45	44	42	8th	R16	Did not qualify		(Serbia) Kustodic, (Hungary) Disztl	
1997–98	1	NBI	34	7	10	17	43	58	31	16th ^{1}	R16	Did not qualify		(Hungary) Szabó, (Hungary) Vágó	
1998–99	1	NBI ↓	34	7	9	18	36	54	30	16th	R16	Did not qualify		(Hungary) Csongrádi, (Hungary) Verebes	
1999–00	2	NBII ↑	38	32	5	1	104	19	101	1st	R16	Did not qualify		(Hungary) Verebes	
2000–01	1	NBI	36	15	5	16	58	56	52	8th	R	Did not qualify		(Hungary) Csongrádi	
2001–02	1	NBI	38	15	10	13	56	53	55	5th	QF	Did not qualify		(Hungary) Várhidi	
2002–03	1	NBI	32	11	7	14	46	41	40	8th	R16	Did not qualify		(Hungary) Bicskei	
2003–04	1	NBI	32	10	10	12	55	51	40	8th	QF	Intertoto Cup	1R	(Hungary) Csank	
2004–05	1	NBI	30	11	10	9	44	38	40	8th	QF	Did not qualify		(Hungary) Csertői	
2005–06	1	NBI	30	19	7	4	52	24	64	3rd	W	Did not qualify		(Hungary) Csertői, (Hungary) Németh	
2006–07	1	NBI	30	13	5	12	45	43	44	6th	R32	UEFA Cup	2QR	(Croatia) Vlak	
2007–08	1	NBI	30	17	3	10	48	32	54	5th	QF	Did not qualify		(Hungary) Disztl	
2008–09	1	NBI	30	14	6	10	42	34	48	6th	R16	Did not qualify		(Hungary) Varga, (Hungary) Disztl	
2009–10	1	NBI	30	18	7	5	59	31	61	2nd	QF	Did not qualify		(Hungary) Mezey	
2010–11	1	NBI	30	18	7	5	59	29	61	1st	R	Europa League	2QR	(Hungary) Mezey	
2011–12	1	NBI	30	21	3	6	58	19	66	2nd	SF	Champions League	2QR	(Portugal) Sousa	
2012–13	1	NBI	30	16	6	8	52	24	54	2nd	SF	Europa League	GS	(Portugal) Sousa	
2013–14	1	NBI	30	15	8	7	52	31	53	4th	R16	Europa League	1QR	(Portugal) Gomes	
2014–15	1	NBI	30	22	5	3	64	15	71	1st	R	Did not qualify		(Spain) Carrillo	
2015–16	1	NBI	33	17	4	12	42	29	55	2nd	QF	Champions League/Europa League	3QR/PO	(France) Casoni ^{2}, (Hungary) Horváth	
2016–17	1	NBI	33	18	8	7	65	28	62	2nd	R32	Europa League	3QR	(Norway) Berg	
2017–18	1	NBI	33	20	8	5	65	28	68	1st	R32	Europa League	PO	(Serbia) Nikolić	
2018–19	1	NBI	33	18	7	8	53	37	61	2nd	W	Champions League/Europa League	PO/GS	(Serbia) Nikolić	
2019–20	1	NBI	33	18	9	6	56	29	63	2nd	SF	Europa League	2QR	(Serbia) Nikolić, (Spain) Carrillo	
2020–21	1	NBI	33	16	8	9	68	38	56	3rd	R	Europa League	PO	(Hungary) Márton, (Hungary) Szabics	
2021–22	1	NBI	33	13	9	11	48	43	48	4th	QF	Conference League	1QR	(Hungary) Szabics, (Germany) Boris	
2022–23	1	NBI	33	8	11	14	38	43	35	10th	R32	Conference League	PO	(Germany) Boris, (Hungary) Huszti–Toldi, (Sweden) Grzelak	
2023–24	1	NBI	33	16	6	11	55	40	54	4th	R64	Did not qualify		(Sweden) Grzelak	
2024–25	2	NBI ↓	33	8	7	18	34	52	31	11th	R64	Conference League	3QR	(Hungary) Pető	
2025–26	2	NBII	30	10	9	11	37	33	39	8th	TBD	Did Not Qualify			

Notes

- Note 1: Relegation play-off against Sopron (2–1 and 3–0)
- Note 2: (Hungary) Pető as caretaker manager (debuted against Lech Poznań in the 2015–16 UEFA Europa League)
