= History of Fehérvár FC =

Fehérvár Football Club is a professional Hungarian football club based in Székesfehérvár, Hungary.

== 1940s ==
Founded in 1941 as Székesfehérvári Vadásztölténygyár SK by the defense manufacturing company Székesfehérvári Vadásztölténygyár, the club was made up of workers of the local factory in its early years. The team first entered the Fejér County Championship in 1942–43 and went on to win the championship. In 1948, the club was broken into three teams, with one team playing in the Nemzeti Bajnokság III (third Division of the National Championship), one in the County Championship and the third one in the Second division of the County Championship. In 1950, the workers of the factory assembled their own team in the hope of achieving better results, and the club was renamed Vadásztölténygyári Vasas on 10 March. Later on they eventually agreed on 3 January 1956, that all teams would join forces in a unified team built on Vadásztölténygyár. In that season the team won the County Championship by a very wide margin, and, after winning the following year's County Championship Winners Trophy, qualified for the Nemzeti Bajnokság II (second Division of the National Championship) for the 1957–58 season.

== 1960s ==
The first opportunity to play in Hungary's highest league came along only a few years later. In the 1961–62 season the team finished in third position – barely qualifying for the first division. Known then as VT Vasas, the dream finally came true in 1967 when the team finished second in the second division and was promoted to the top league.

On 22 January 1968, the club was renamed Videoton SC, due to a sponsorship agreement with the electrical goods manufacturer Videoton. The first season in the top league wasn't very successful. The team won 9 games but lost 18 matches, finishing in 15th place, which resulted in them being relegated.

However, the following year, Videoton bounced back and won the second division. The next five years saw the club consolidate its position in the first division by finishing tenth, seventh, fifth, fourth and again fifth. Then in the 1975–76 season the team achieved the best position in its history by finishing second.

Videoton went on to produce modest results in the ensuing years, failing to finish in the top three on four occasions. Finally, in 1982, the Fehervar club reached the final of the Hungarian Cup, but were defeated 2–0 by Újpest. This was the beginning of the club's golden age. In 1984, the team finished third with the same number of points as ETO Győr, who finished second, but due only to a superior head-to-head performance. That season saw, József Szabó become the top goal-scorer in the 1st division with 19 goals.

== 1980s ==

Videoton's linup in the 1985 UEFA Cup Final against Real Madrid CF at the Santiago Bernabéu Stadium.

The club caught international attention when it reached the 1985 UEFA Cup Final during a campaign under the management of Ferenc Kovács. In the 1984–85 UEFA Cup season Videoton overcame Dukla Prague (1–0, 0–0) in the first round, Paris Saint-Germain (4–2, 2–0) in the second round, FK Partizan (0–2, 5–0) in the third round. They then had further success in the quarter-finals where Videoton played against Manchester United. At Old Trafford, Manchester United beat Videoton by a 1–0 scoreline with the only goal coming from Frank Stapleton. The return leg in Székesfehérvár saw Videoton beat the English team 1–0. In the penalty shootout Videoton won 5–4. In the semi-finals Videoton played Yugoslav Željezničar. In the first leg in Fehervar, Videoton won 3–1 and it proved enough to overcome their Yugoslavian opponents after losing 2–1 in Sarajevo. In the final they came up against Spanish team Real Madrid. The first leg match was played at a packed out stadium in Székesfehérvár, which saw Videoton lose 3–0 in front of a record 38,000 spectators at the Sóstói Stadion. Ferenc Kovács' side then flew out to Madrid for the return leg at the Bernabéu Videoton beat Real Madrid by 1–0 but lost 3–1 on aggregate. The only goal of that memorable match was scored by Lajos Májer in the 86th minute. In the Hungarian domestic championship Videoton once again finished in third place.

8 May 1985

Videoton (Hungary)	0–3	(Spain) Real Madrid
	Report Overview (archive) Overview	Míchel 31'; Santillana 77'; Valdano 89'

Sóstói Stadion, Székesfehérvár
Attendance: 38,000
Referee: Michel Vautrot (France)
22 May 1985

Real Madrid (Spain)	0–1	(Hungary) Videoton
	Report Overview (archive) Overview	Májer 86'

Santiago Bernabéu Stadium, Madrid
Attendance: 98,300
Referee: Alexis Ponnet (Belgium)

== 1990s ==
After the golden era, Videoton continued to be a mainstay in the first division. However, they failed to achieve any significant results. The 1998 season saw them barely escape relegation, which surprised many. Finishing the season in 16th place, the club had to win a play-off against Sopron to remain in the top flight. They managed to do this by winning both games 2–1 and 3–0. Relegation came the following year ending a run of 29 years in the first division.

== 2000s ==
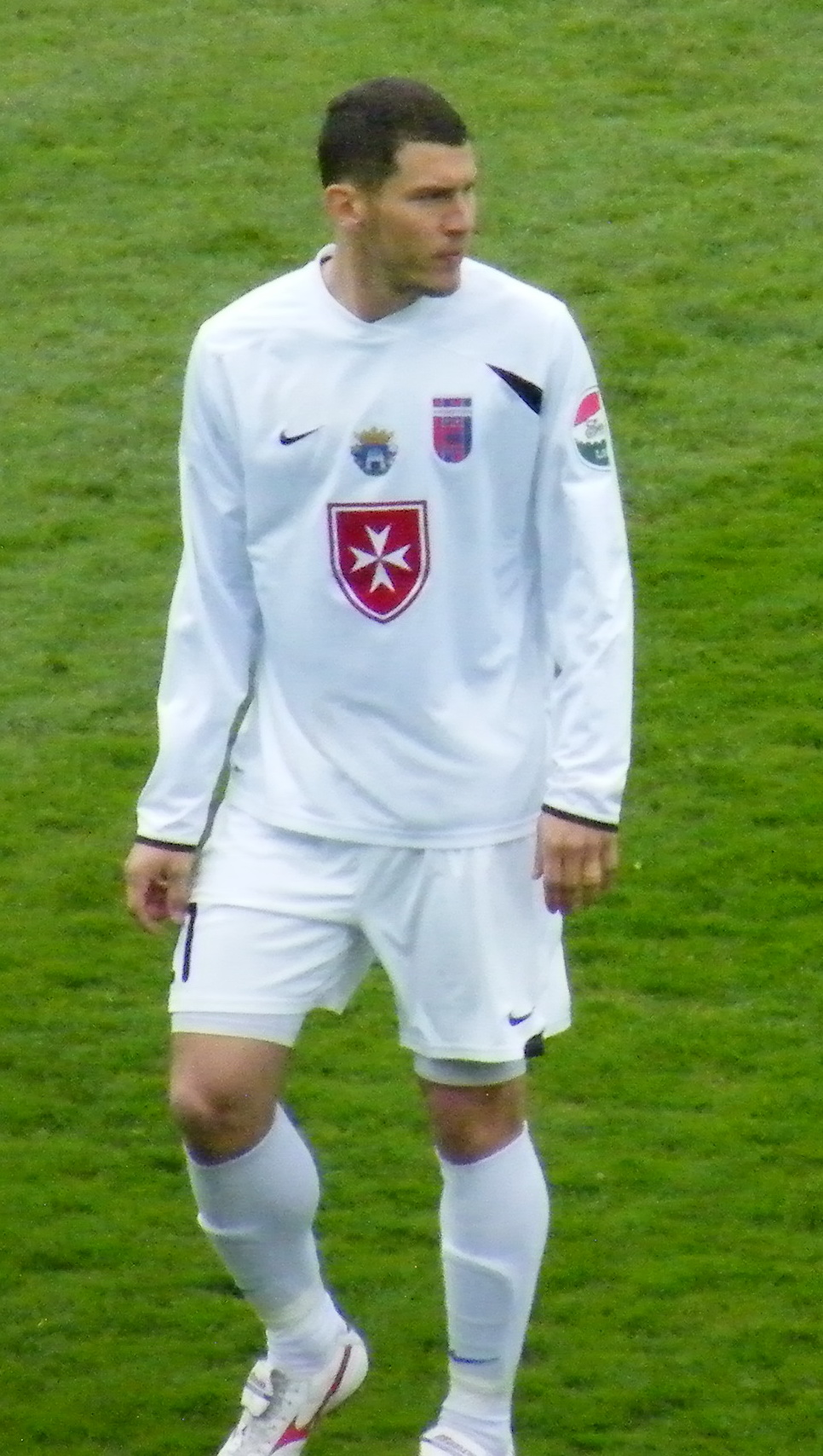
Andre Alves became top-scorer and champion in 2010

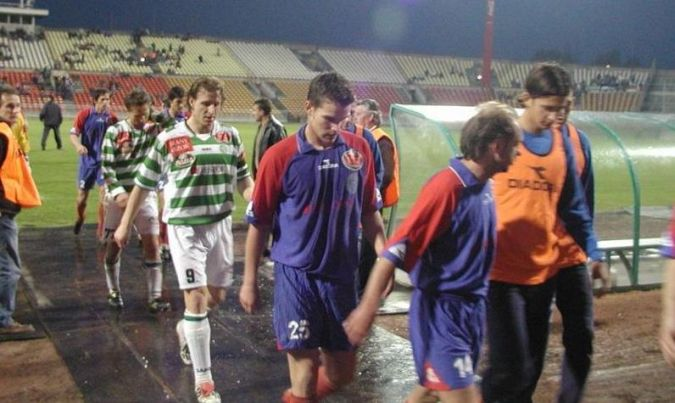
Győr-Videoton in 2004

This was the beginning of a period for the club, which saw them go upwards and develop. After winning the Second Division and gaining promotion in 2000, the teamed once again reached the cup final in 2001, losing 5–2 to Debrecen. This led to the team's only participation in the Intertoto Cup, where they were defeated by Marek Dupnitsa in the first round. In 2005, the club changed its name to FC Fehérvar. The next year saw the club's most successful domestic year. After a third-place finish, the first in 21 years, the team finally won the Hungarian Cup for the first time by defeating Vasas 6–5 in a penalty shoot-out, after the match had finished 2–2 after extra time. A brand new main stand was erected and handed over in 2004. Videoton were close to bankruptcy when businessman István Garancsi rescued the club. He brought financial stability and a resurgence in fortunes on the pitch. 2008 saw the team win the first ever League Cup by defeating Debrecen 3–0 on aggregate (Home 1–0; Away 2–0). They won the League cup again in 2009, this time beating Pécsi 3–1 in the final.

Videoton FC entered into a joint working relationship with the Puskás Academy in Felcsút.

At the beginning of the Hungarian National Championship 2009–10 season, the club reassumed the Videoton name.

In 2010 Videoton FC were leading the Hungarian National Championship I 2009–10 for many weeks, but in the end their rivals Debrecen won the championship. The team finished second, and qualified for the Europa League.

== 2010s ==
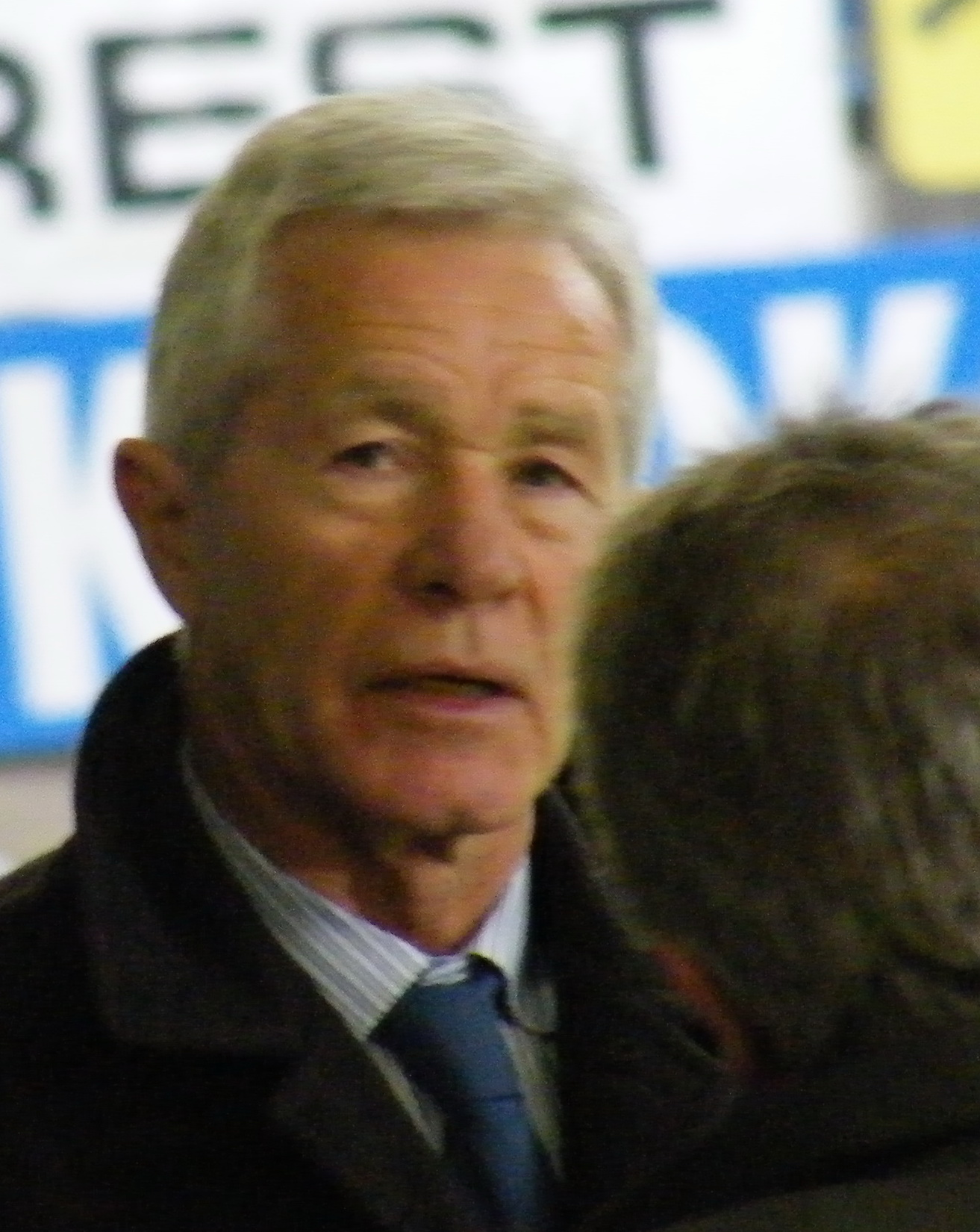
György Mezey managed Videoton to win the 2010–11 Nemzeti Bajnokság I season

In the first half of the 2010–11 season Videoton climbed to the top of the league, and remained there until the end. The end of the season saw the club reach its peak by winning the Hungarian League title for the first time in its history. They debuted in the UEFA Champions League by entering UEFA Champions League 2011–12 season. Videoton FC played their first ever match in Klagenfurt, Austria against Sturm Graz. Videoton lost 2–0 the first leg of the match. In the second leg of the match Videoton beat Sturm Graz 3–2 which resulted the farewell from the international turf.

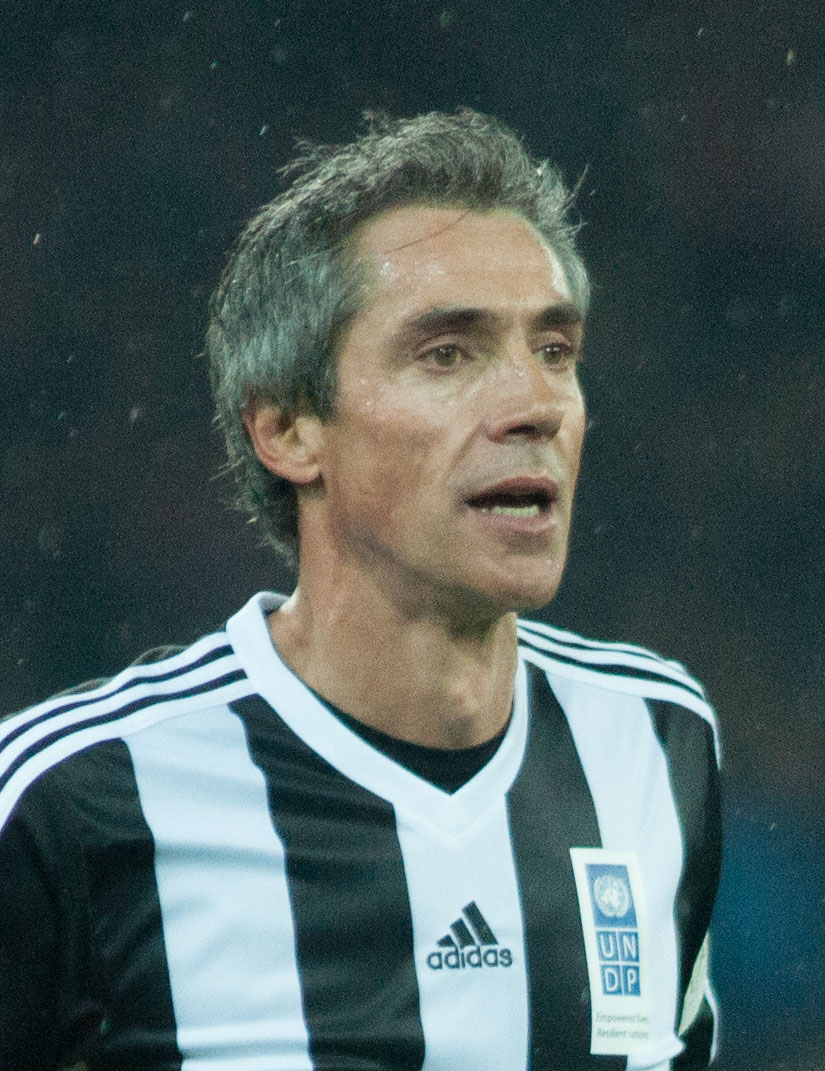
Paulo Sousa managed to lead Videoton into the group stages of the Europa league 2012–13 season

The 2012–13 season started with the triumph in the Hungarian Supercup against Debrecen, the champions of the 2011–12 season. Videoton defeated the Hajdús on penalties after a 1–1 draw at home. On 29 July 2012 Videoton started the 2012–13 season of the Hungarian League with a 1–1 draw against Pápa. On the international turf, Videoton entered the second round of the UEFA Europa League 2012–13 season against the Slovak Slovan Bratislava. The first leg was played in Bratislava and ended in 1–1 draw. The second leg ended with a goalless draw which resulted Videoton's qualification for the third round. In the first leg of the third round Videoton beat the Belgian KAA Gent 1–0 at the Sóstói Stadion. The only goal was scored by Nikolić in the 78th minute. The second leg was won by 3–0 by Videoton at the Jules Ottenstadion. The goals were scored by Oliveira and Nikolić (2). At the play-off stage of the Europa League 2012–13 Videoton played the first leg against the Turkish Trabzonspor at the Hüseyin Avni Aker Stadium. The match finished with a goalless draw. On 30 August 2012 Videoton received Trabzonspor, the result was a goalless draw after extra time and the penalty shootout was won by Videoton 4–2. Videoton thus reached the group stages of the UEFA Europa League 2012–13. On 20 September Videoton played their first Europa League group match against KRC Genk at the Cristal Arena in Genk, Belgium. Videoton's inexperience at the European level was ruthlessly exploited by Genk and the Belgian club won the match by 3–0. On 4 September 2012 (the 2nd matchday) Videoton hosted the Portuguese Sporting CP in the Europa League, which was very exciting due to the fact that Videoton have Portuguese a manager as Sousa and former Sporting players such as Caneira and Renato Neto. In the first half Vinícius, Oliveira and Nikolić scored and after a goalless second half the team celebrated one of the biggest triumphs in Videoton's modern history. On 25 October 2012 Videoton defeated FC Basel 2–1 at home therefore they extended their unbeaten European run in Székesfehérvár to nine matches. On 28 October Videoton beat reigning Hungarian League champions Debrecen 3–1 at home. On 8 November Basel beat Videoton at the St. Jakob-Park, Basel, Switzerland. The only goal was scored in the 80th minute by Streller. On 22 November Videoton hosted KRC Genk and lost to the Belgian club by a goal in the 19th minute by Barda. The last group match was due to be played on 6 December, however due to heavy rain it was postponed and played the day after on 7 December. At the Estádio José Alvalade, Lisbon, Portugal, Sousa's team lost to 2–1 to Sporting CP, Sporting took the lead in the 65th minute by a goal from Labyad which was equalized by Sándor in the 80th minute. However, just after 2 minutes Sporting took the lead again by a goal from Viola. The final result meant that Videoton was eliminated from the 2012–13 season of the Europa League. All in all, Videoton could gain 6 points in 6 matches.

In the 2012–13 Nemzeti Bajnokság I, Videoton finished second. Therefore, they were eligible for entering 2013-14 UEFA Europa League. On 4 July 2013 Videoton hosted Mladost Podgorica in the first round of the UEFA Europa League 2013–14 season. The first leg ended in a 2–1 victory for the home team. In the second leg Videoton lost to 1–0 which resulted their early exit from the European contest.

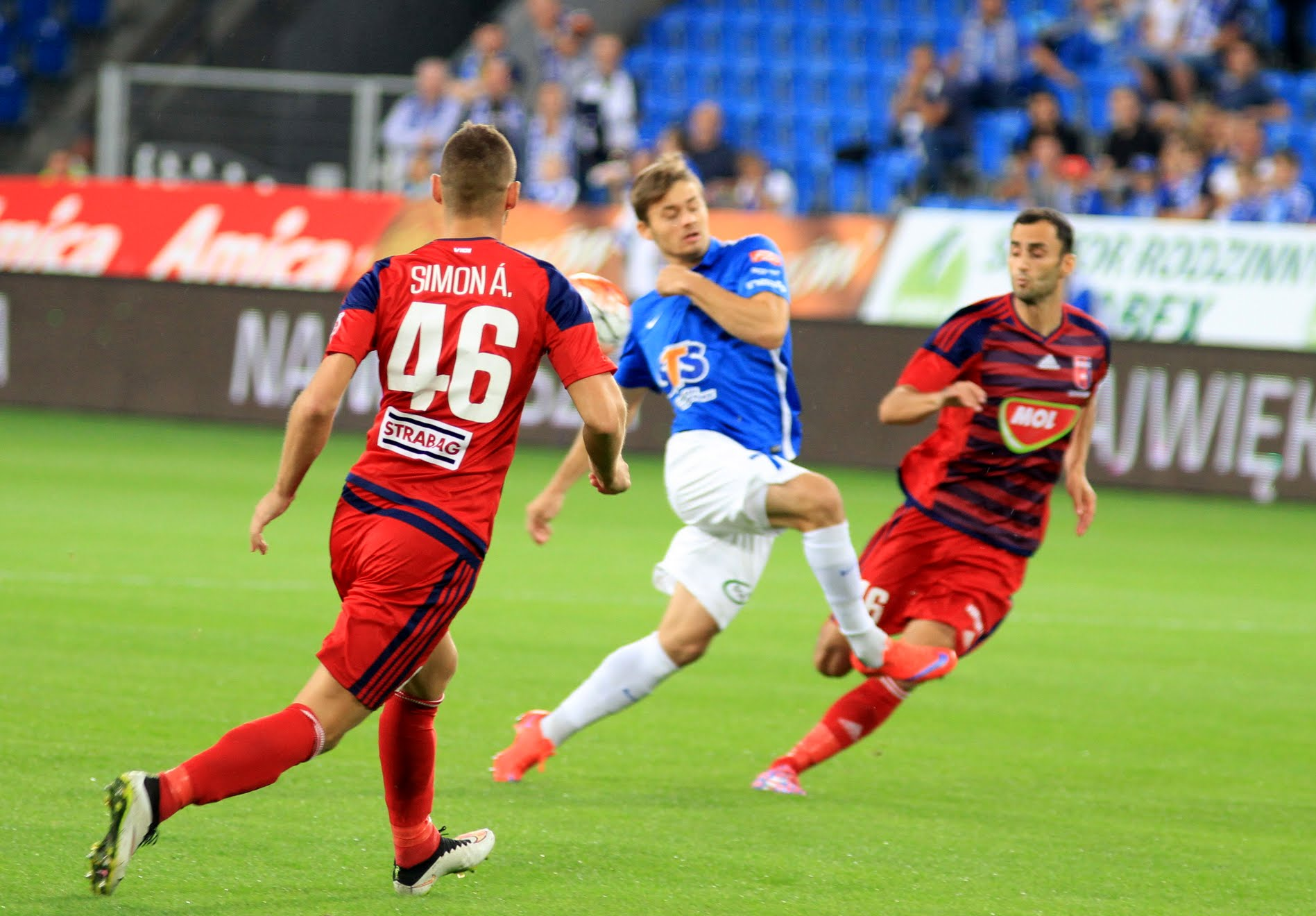
Videoton-Lech Poznań in the 2015–16 UEFA Europa League play-off at Stadion Miejski (Linetty of Lech Poznań in attack against Simon and Oliveira)

Videoton won the 2014–15 season of the Hungarian League. Consequently, Videoton could enter the 2015–16 UEFA Champions League. In the second round, Videoton beat the Welsh The New Saints F.C. 1–0 at the Park Hall in Oswestry, Wales on 14 July 2015. In the second leg, played at the Sóstói Stadion, Székesfehérvár on 22 July 2015, Videoton was stunned by a TNS goal just ten minutes before the final whistle, and with a tie on aggregate, the sides went on extra-time, where Gyurcsó managed to bring the score to a 1–1 tie and Videoton qualified for the next phase with a 2–1 on aggregate. In the third round, Videoton drew with BATE Borisov at Sóstói Stadion on 28 July 2015. The first goal was scored by Karnitsky in the 56th minute, while the equalizer was scored by Vinícius in the 89th minute securing a draw for the home side. In the second leg, BATE Borisov beat Videoton by 1–0 at the Borisov Arena, Borisov, Belarus on 5 August 2015. The only goal was scored by Nikolić in the 82nd minute into his own net. After the farewell from the UEFA Champions League, Videoton were eligible to enter the 2015–16 UEFA Europa League play-off round. On 20 August 2015, Lech Poznań beat Videoton 3–0 at the Stadion Miejski, Poznań, Poland. In the second leg, Lech Poznań beat Videoton 1–0 at the Sóstói Stadion, Székesfehérvár on 27 August 2015. The Polish club qualified for the 2015–16 UEFA Europa League group stage, while Videoton were eliminated.

In the 2015–16 Nemzeti Bajnokság I season Videoton finished second, while Ferencváros won their 29th title. Consequently, Videoton could enter the 2016–17 UEFA Europa League qualifying phase and play-off round. In the first round, Videoton beat FC Zaria Bălți 3–0 at the Pancho Aréna, Felcsút, on 30 June 2016. The goals were scored by Géresi in the 18th minute and Feczesin in the 88th and 94th minutes. In the second leg Videoton were beaten by FC Zaria Bălți 2–0 at the Zimbru Stadium, Chișinău on 7 July 2016. Videoton qualified for the second round on 3–2 aggregate. In the second round, Videoton beat FK Čukarički 2–0 at the Pancho Aréna, Felcsút, on 14 July 2016. The goals were scored by Bódi in the 58th minute and Suljić in the 92nd minute. In the second leg Videoton drew with FK Čukarički at the Čukarički Stadium, Belgrade, Serbia, on 21 July 2016. Videoton qualified for the third round on 3–1 aggregate. In the third round, Videoton were beaten by FC Midtjylland at the Pancho Aréna on 28 July 2016. In the second leg, Videoton drew (1–1) with FC Midtjylland after extra time at the MCH Arena, Herning, Denmark on 4 August 2016. Midtjylland won 2–1 on aggregate and qualified for the play-off phase.

In the 2016–17 Nemzeti Bajnokság I season, Videoton were competing for the title until the last matchday. On Match day 33, Budapest Honvéd FC hosted Videoton at the Bozsik Stadion, Budapest. Both teams had 62 points but Honvéd won more matches therefore they were ranked first. As a consequence, Videoton had to win the match against Budapest Honvéd to obtain their third Hungarian League title. On 27 May 2017, Videoton were defeated by 1–0 by Honvéd which resulted the silver medal for Videoton. Consequently, Videoton were eligible to play in the 2017–18 UEFA Europa League season. In the first round, Videoton beat the Maltese Balzan F.C. 2–0 at Pancho Aréna, Felcsút, on 29 June 2017. In the second leg Balzan and Videoton drew (3–3) at the Hibernians Stadium, in Paola, Malta, which resulted Videoton's qualifying for the second round on 5–3 aggregate. In the first leg of the second round Videoton beat 2016 Meistriliiga third placed Nõmme Kalju FC at the Kadriorg Stadium, Tallinn, Estonia on 13 July 2017. The goals were scored by Pátkai in the 8th minute and Šćepović in the 47th and 74th minutes. In the second leg, Videoton drew with Nõmme Kalju FC at Pancho Aréna on 20 July 2017. The goals were scored by Lazović in the 37th minute and Dmitrijev in the 50th minute. Videoton qualified for the third round on 4–1 aggregate. In the third round the sixth best team of the 2016–17 Ligue 1 season, FC Girondins de Bordeaux, beat Videoton 2–1 at the Matmut Atlantique, Bordeaux, France, on 27 July 2017. Bordeaux took the lead in the 18th minute by a goal scored by Sankharé. However, Videoton equalized in the 23rd minute by Šćepović. In the 33rd minute Bordeaux took the lead again by the goal of Sankharé. On 3 August 2017, Videoton beat FC Girondins de Bordeaux 1–0 at the Pancho Aréna. The only goal was scored by Cape Verdean Stopira in the 45+5 minute. Videoton qualified for the play-off round on 2–2 aggregate winning on away goals.

On 27 May Videoton won their third Nemzeti Bajnokság I title by defeating title-holders Budapest Honvéd FC in the 32 round of the 2017–18 Nemzeti Bajnokság I. Therefore, Videoton were eligible to enter the 2018–19 UEFA Champions League. On 1 July 2018 the name of the club were change to MOL Vidi FC. On 10 July Fehérvár drew with F91 Dudelange at the Stade Jos Nosbaum in Dudelange, Luxembourg. In the second leg on 17 July 2018, Fehérvár defeated Dudelange by 2–1 at Pancho Aréna, Felcsút. On 25 July 2018, PFC Ludogorets Razgrad drew (0–0) with Fehérvár at the Ludogorets Arena in Razgrad, Bulgaria. On 1 August 2018 Fehérvár beat Ludogorets at the Pancho Aréna by 1–0. The only Fehérvár goal was scored by Anel Hadžić in the 45th minute. Since 1 July 2019, the name will be changed to Mol Fehérvár FC. This change won't affect anything else, as the Vidi brand will also be used by the club.

== 2020s ==
On 15 July 2021, Fehérvár suffered a shocking 2–0 defeat in the first round of the 2021-22 UEFA Europa Conference League qualifying phase and play-off round against FC Ararat Yerevan. Fehérvár were eliminated from the UEFA Conference League.

On 17 July 2021, Zoltán Kovács resigned from his position of sports director.

On 21 July 2022, Fehérvár beat Gabala FK 4–1 at home in the first leg of the second round of the 2022–23 UEFA Europa Conference League. Kenan Kodro scored twice, while Adrian Rus and Budu Zivzivadze scored one goal each. Although Fehérvár lost 2–1 in the second leg on 28 July 2022 in the Gabala City Stadium, they won 5–3 on aggregate.

On 17 October 2022, Szabolcs Huszti was appointed as the new coach of the club. On the same day István Sallói was replaced by Roland Juhász as the sports director.

Fehérvár drew with Mezőkövesd even if in the last minutes the club still had the chance to take the lead. However, Kenan Kodro missed the penalty. After the match the supporters wanted the sports director's resignation.

Before their match against Zalaegerszeg the club decided to give away the tickets for free of charfe in order to attract more people for the club's fight for avoiding relegation. The match was won by Fehérvár 3–1 in front of 6,237 spectators on 20 May 2023.

On 15 March 2023, Bartosz Grzelak was appointed as the new head coach of the club. Fehérvár finished 10th and were not relegated in the 2022–23 Nemzeti Bajnokság I season. Although the results of the club were far beyond compared to the previous years, the club decided not to sack their head coach.

In the 2023–24 Nemzeti Bajnokság I season, Fehérvár started with defeats. On 29 July 2023, Fehérvár lost to Újpest FC at the Szusza Ferenc Stadion (2–1). On 6 August 2023, Fehérvár lost 3–5 to reigning champions Ferencvárosi TC at home. The third consecutive defeat was against Kecskeméti TE at the Széktói Stadion (1–0) on 13 August 2023. The first victory of the season was against Mezőkövesdi SE at home on 27 August 2023. On 16 September 2023, Fehérvár were eliminated from the 2023–24 Magyar Kupa season by Erzsébeti Spartacus MTK LE. After the surprising defeat, Grezlak said that "we have to be ashamed". On 20 September 2023, Roland Juhász resigned as the sports director of the club. After a defeat against Debreceni VSC on 22 October 2023, Fehérvár won their three consecutive games. First, they beat Diósgyőri VTK 4–0 on 28 October 2023. Second, Fehérvár beat Újpest FC 2–1 on 4 November 2023. Both matches were played at their home. The third victory was against Ferencvárosi TC at the Ferencváros Stadion on 12 November 2023. The three consecutive victories were stopped by Kecskeméti TE with a 3–3 draw at the Sóstói Stadion on 26 November 2023. During the match, Zsolt Kalmár got injured. After the match Grzelak said that "if someone leaves the pitch like this, doesn't mean a good thing". On 2 December 2023, Fehérvár beat Puskás Akadémia FC 3–1 at their home. In an interview with Nemzeti Sport, Bartosz Grzelak said that the team should not feel that everything would be OK just because Fehérvár were in the third position in the table.

On 13 February 2025, key person, Áron Csongvai was signed by AIK Fotboll. On 14 February 2025, Fehérvár lost to Győr 1–0 at home in the Nemzeti Bajnokság I. After the match, Tamás Pető said that he lost his leader referring to the departure of Csongvai. Csaba Spandler said in an interview that Csongvai's departure had a negative effect on the atmosphere in the changing room and on the pitch as well.

On 24 May 2025, Fehérvár were relegated to the second tier after spending 26 consecutive years in the top flight. On the last match day, Fehérvár were forced to beat Debrecen at their home stadium. However, the match ended with a 3–0 away win for Debrecen which resulted Fehérvár's farewell from the Nemzeti Bajnokság I. On 23 June 2025, Gábor Bóér was appointed as the manager of the club.

On 11 November 2025, Nemanja Nikolić was appointed as a sports director. On 12 November 2025, Tamás Pető was re-appointed as the manager of the club.
