= List of Fehérvár FC managers =

Fehérvár Football Club is a professional Hungarian football club based in Székesfehérvár, Hungary.

== Managers ==
| Manager | Nationality | From | To | P | W | D | L | GF | GA | Win | Honours | Notes |
|---|---|---|---|---|---|---|---|---|---|---|---|---|
| József Albert † | Hungary | 1964 | 1965 | | | | | | | | | |
| Béla Kárpáti † | Hungary | 1967 | 1968 | | | | | | | | | |
| Lajos Németh † | Hungary | 1968 | | | | | | | | | | |
| András Turay † | Hungary | 1969 | | | | | | | | | | |
| Imre Kovács † | Hungary | 1970 | 1970 | | | | | | | | | |
| Géza Kalocsay † | Hungary Czechoslovakia | 1 January 1971 | 30 June 1972 | | | | | | | | | |
| Ferenc Kovács † | Hungary | 1 July 1972 | 30 June 1977 | | | | | | | | | |
| Mihály Lantos † | Hungary | 1977 | 1980 | | | | | | | | | |
| József Verebes † | Hungary | 1980 | 1981 | | | | | | | | | |
| Antal Szentmihályi † | Hungary | 1981 | 1982 | | | | | | | | | |
| Ferenc Molnár | Hungary | 1982 | 1983 | | | | | | | | | |
| Ferenc Kovács | Hungary | 1 July 1983 | 30 June 1986 | | | | | | | | | |
| József Tajti | Hungary | 1986 | 1987 | | | | | | | | | |
| Ferenc Kovács | Hungary | 1 July 1987 | 30 June 1988 | | | | | | | | | |
| Gábor Kaszás | Hungary | 1988 | 1989 | | | | | | | | | |
| György Mezey † | Hungary | 25 February 1990 | 30 June 1990 | | | | | | | | | |
| Győző Burcsa | Hungary | 1990 | 1992 | | | | | | | | | |
| Gábor Hartyáni | Hungary | 15 July 1992 | 18 April 1994 | | | | | | | | | |
| Gábor Hartyáni | | | | | | | | | | | | |
| Miklós Jánky (interim) | | | | | | | | | | | | |
| László Kiss | Hungary | 19 April 1994 | 30 June 1994 | 8 | 3 | 1 | 4 | 9 | 9 | | | |
| Emerich Jenei † | Romania | 1 July 1994 | 7 October 1994 | 8 | 0 | 3 | 5 | 9 | 19 | | | |
| Károly Szabó | Hungary | 1994 | 1995 | | | | | | | | | |
| Ferenc Csongrádi | Hungary | 30 October 1995 | 30 June 1996 | 18 | 6 | 6 | 6 | 27 | 24 | | | |
| Slobodan Kustudić | Serbia and Montenegro | 1996 | 1997 | | | | | | | | | |
| László Disztl | Hungary | 1997 | | | | | | | | | | |
| József Szabó | Hungary | 1997 | | | | | | | | | | |
| Attila Vágó | Hungary | 1998 | | | | | | | | | | |
| Ferenc Csongrádi | Hungary | 30 March 1998 | 16 October 1998 | 21 | 4 | 5 | 12 | 21 | 39 | | | |
| József Verebes † | Hungary | 1 July 1998 | 30 June 1999 | | | | | | | | | |
| János Csank | Hungary | 1999 | 2000 | | | | | | | | | |
| Ferenc Csongrádi | Hungary | 1 July 2000 | 19 April 2001 | | | | | | | | | |
| Péter Várhidi | Hungary | 20 April 2001 | 28 December 2002 | 74 | 30 | 15 | 29 | 114 | 109 | | | |
| Bertalan Bicskei † | Hungary | 1 January 2003 | 1 July 2003 | 17 | 8 | 2 | 7 | 34 | 19 | | | |
| János Csank | Hungary | 1 July 2003 | 30 June 2004 | 32 | 10 | 10 | 12 | 55 | 51 | | | |
| Aurél Csertői | Hungary | 23 July 2004 | 20 October 2006 | 96 | 44 | 23 | 29 | 145 | 111 | | 2005–06 MK | |
| Zoltán Németh | Hungary | 2006 | | | | | | | | | | |
| Marijan Vlak | Croatia | 22 December 2006 | 31 December 2007 | | | | | | | | | |
| László Disztl | Hungary | 1 July 2008 | 16 August 2008 | | | | | | | | | |
| István Varga | Hungary | 20 August 2008 | 29 May 2009 | | | | | | | | | |
| László Disztl | Hungary | 2009 | | | | | | | | | | |
| György Mezey † | Hungary | 1 July 2009 | 1 June 2011 | 75 | 44 | 17 | 14 | 148 | 73 | | 2010–11 NBI | |
| Paulo Sousa | Portugal | 1 June 2011 | 7 January 2013 | 69 | 40 | 12 | 17 | 111 | 54 | | | |
| José Gomes | Portugal | 20 January 2013 | 2 June 2014 | 52 | 29 | 10 | 13 | 98 | 49 | | | |
| Joan Carrillo | Spain | 6 June 2014 | 3 June 2015 | 37 | 28 | 5 | 4 | 78 | 22 | | 2014–15 NBI | |
| Bernard Casoni | France | 11 June 2015 | 19 August 2015 | 9 | 2 | 2 | 5 | 7 | 11 | | | |
| Tamás Pető (caretaker) | Hungary | 19 August 2015 | 6 October 2015 | | | | | | | | | |
| Ferenc Horváth | Hungary | 6 October 2015 | 1 May 2016 | 27 | 16 | 5 | 6 | 37 | 17 | | | |
| Henning Berg | Norway | 5 May 2016 | 3 June 2017 | 42 | 22 | 10 | 10 | 83 | 36 | | | |
| Marko Nikolić | Serbia | 3 June 2017 | 25 November 2019 | 120 | 69 | 27 | 24 | 210 | 114 | | 2017–18 NBI / 2018–19 MK | |
| Joan Carrillo | Spain | 25 November 2019 | 6 July 2020 | 27 | 13 | 10 | 4 | 40 | 20 | | | |
| Gábor Márton | Hungary | 8 July 2020 | 17 February 2021 | 28 | 15 | 6 | 7 | 65 | 34 | | | |
| Tamás Szalai (interim) | Hungary | | | | | | | | | | | |
| Imre Szabics | Hungary | 1 April 2021 | 16 February 2022 | 34 | 17 | 7 | 10 | 60 | 39 | | | |
| Michael Boris | Germany | 16 February 2022 | 17 October 2022 | 32 | 13 | 6 | 13 | 54 | 48 | | | |
| Szabolcs Huszti | Hungary | 17 October 2022 | 14 March 2023 | 13 | 3 | 4 | 6 | 17 | 18 | | | |
| Bartosz Grzelak | Sweden | 15 March 2023 | 12 June 2024 | 48 | 18 | 11 | 15 | 65 | 50 | | | |
| Tamás Pető | Hungary | 15 June 2024 | 15 April 2025 | 35 | 12 | 7 | 16 | 42 | 48 | | | |
| Krisztián Tímár | Hungary | 15 April 2025 | 23 June 2025 | 6 | 0 | 1 | 5 | 2 | 13 | 0.00 | | |
| Gábor Boér | Hungary | 23 June 2025 | 10 November 2025 | 15 | 5 | 4 | 6 | 17 | 16 | | | |
| Tamás Pető (2nd spell) | Hungary | 12 November 2025 | 26 October 2026 | 30 | 11 | 5 | 14 | 40 | 37 | | | |
| Balázs Bekő | Hungary | 26 October 2026 | present | | | | | | | | | |
