= 1956 in association football =

The following are the football (soccer) events of the year 1956 throughout the world.

== Events ==
- November 3 – Dutch club Rapid JC makes its European debut with a defeat (3-4) on home soil against Yugoslavia's Red Star Belgrade in the second round of the European Cup.
- Foundation of Royal Thai Navy F.C.

== Winners club national championship ==
- Argentina: River Plate
- England: Manchester United
- France: Nice
- Israel: Maccabi Tel Aviv
- Italy: ACF Fiorentina
- Mexico: León
- Paraguay: Olimpia Asunción
- Scotland: Rangers
- Soviet Union: FC Spartak Moscow
- Spain: Atlético Bilbao
- Sweden: IFK Norrköping
- West Germany: Borussia Dortmund

== International tournaments ==
- Olympic Games in Melbourne, Australia (November 24 – December 8, 1956)
  1. Soviet Union
  2. Yugoslavia
  3. Bulgaria
- 1956 British Home Championship (October 22, 1955 – April 14, 1956)

Shared by England, Scotland, Wales & Northern Ireland

== Births ==
=== January ===
- January 16: Martin Jol (Dutch footballer and manager)
- January 17: Faouzi Mansouri (Algerian footballer) (died 2022)
- January 31: Stefan Majewski (Polish footballer)

=== February ===
- February 14: Reinhold Hintermaier (Austrian footballer)
- February 18: Rüdiger Abramczik (German footballer)
- February 21: Alan Hart, English former professional footballer
- February 25: Davie Cooper (Scottish footballer) (died 1995)
- February 28: Jimmy Nicholl (Northern Irish footballer)
- February 29: Allan Marley (English former professional footballer)

=== March ===
- March 3: Zbigniew Boniek, Polish international footballer
- March 4: Philippe Mahut, French international footballer (died 2014)
- March 12: László Kiss, Hungarian footballer
- March 12: Pim Verbeek, Dutch footballer and manager (died 2019)
- March 15: Gilberto Yearwood, Honduran footballer
- March 24: Włodzimierz Ciołek, Polish footballer
- March 29: Ferenc Csongrádi, Hungarian footballer
- March 29: Dick Jol, Dutch football referee

=== April ===
- April 12: František Jakubec; Czech international footballer (died 2016)

=== May ===
- May 3: Bernd Förster (German international footballer)
- May 15: Ken Ayres (English former professional footballer)
- May 19: Jan Fiala (Czech footballer)

=== June ===
- June 5: Martin Koopman (Dutch footballer)
- June 12: David Narey (Scottish footballer)
- June 22: Jean-Paul Defrang (Luxembourgian footballer)
- June 26: Maxime Bossis (French footballer)

=== July ===
- July 15: Emmanuel Kunde (Cameroonian footballer)
- July 20: Thomas N'Kono (Cameroonian footballer)
- July 29: Jean-Luc Ettori (French footballer)

=== August ===
- August 16: Patricio Hernández (Argentinian footballer)
- August 27: Jean-François Larios (French footballer)
- August 29: Viv Anderson (English footballer)

=== September ===
- September 7: Tony Mitchell, English former professional footballer
- September 8: Jacky Munaron (Belgian footballer)
- September 14
  - Béla Bodonyi (Hungarian footballer)
  - Ray Wilkins (English footballer) (died 2018)
- September 23: Paolo Rossi (Italian footballer) (died 2020)
- September 30: Frank Arnesen (Danish footballer)

=== October ===
- October 10: Raúl Gorriti, Peruvian international footballer (died 2015)
- October 28: Frank Vercauteren (Belgian international footballer)

=== November ===
- November 4: Jan Korte (Dutch footballer and manager)
- November 10: José Luis Brown Argentine international footballer, (died 2019)
- November 16: Max Hagmayr (Austrian footballer)
- November 18: Noel Brotherston (Northern Irish footballer) (died 1995)

=== December ===
- December 6: Klaus Allofs (German footballer)
- December 9: Oscar Garré (Argentine footballer)
- December 10: Jan van Dijk (Dutch footballer and manager)
- December 11: Ricardo Giusti (Argentine footballer)

== Deaths ==
=== August ===
- August 12 – Gianpiero Combi, 53, Italian goalkeeper, captaining winner of the 1934 FIFA World Cup and one of Italy's greatest goalkeepers of all-time.

=== October ===
- October 16 - Jules Rimet, 83, 3rd president of FIFA.
- October 24 - Tom Whittaker, 58, Arsenal manager, heart attack
