= 1985 UEFA Cup final =

- Event: 1984–85 UEFA Cup
Videoton	Real Madrid
(Hungary)	(Spain)
1	3
- on aggregate

First leg
Videoton	Real Madrid
0	3
- Date: 8 May 1985
- Venue: Sóstói Stadion, Székesfehérvár
- Referee: Michel Vautrot (France)
- Attendance: 38,000

Second leg
Real Madrid	Videoton
0	1
- Date: 22 May 1985
- Venue: Santiago Bernabéu, Madrid
- Referee: Alexis Ponnet (Belgium)
- Attendance: 98,300

The 1985 UEFA Cup Final was a football tie played on 8 May and 22 May 1985 between Real Madrid of Spain and Videoton of Hungary. Real Madrid won 3–1 on aggregate. Real would later make this a cup-double, by winning the Copa de la Liga on 15 June after another two-legged final, against their cross-town rivals Atlético Madrid.

Real Madrid's win was the club's first European silverware in nearly two decades (their last major European honour had been the 1965–66 European Cup).

== Route to the final ==
En route to the final, Real Madrid knocked out the holders, Tottenham Hotspur, in the quarter-finals, defeating the London-based club by a score of 1–0 on aggregate. The lone goal of the tie was an own goal from Tottenham's Steve Perryman during the first leg.

Videoton				Round	Real Madrid			
Opponent	Agg.	1st leg	2nd leg		Opponent	Agg.	1st leg	2nd leg
(Czechoslovakia) Dukla Prague	1–0	1–0 (H)	0–0 (A)	First round	(Austria) SSW Innsbruck	5–2	5–0 (H)	0–2 (A)
(France) Paris Saint-Germain	5–2	4–2 (A)	1–0 (H)	Second round	(Socialist Federal Republic of Yugoslavia) Rijeka	4–3	1–3 (A)	3–0 (H)
(Socialist Federal Republic of Yugoslavia) Partizan	5–2	5–0 (H)	0–2 (A)	Third round	(Belgium) Anderlecht	6–4	0–3 (A)	6–1 (H)
(England) Manchester United	1–1 (5–4 p)	0–1 (A)	1–0 (a.e.t.) (H)	Quarter-finals	(England) Tottenham Hotspur	1–0	1–0 (A)	0–0 (H)
(Socialist Federal Republic of Yugoslavia) Željezničar	4–3	3–1 (H)	1–2 (A)	Semi-finals	(Italy) Internazionale	3–2	0–2 (A)	3–0 (H)

== Match details ==
=== First leg ===
8 May 1985

Videoton (Hungary)	0–3	(Spain) Real Madrid
	Report Overview (archive) Overview	Míchel 31'; Santillana 77'; Valdano 89'

Sóstói Stadion, Székesfehérvár
Attendance: 35,000
Referee: Michel Vautrot (France)

Videoton	Real Madrid

GK	1	(Hungary) Péter Disztl
DF	2	(Hungary) István Borsányi
DF	3	(Hungary) László Disztl
DF	4	(Hungary) József Csuhay
DF	5	(Hungary) Gábor Horváth
MF	6	(Hungary) István Palkovics
MF	7	(Hungary) Tibor Végh (c)
MF	8	(Hungary) Géza Wittman
MF	9	(Hungary) Imre Vadász
FW	10	(Hungary) György Novath	(substituted off) 62'
FW	11	(Hungary) Győző Burcsa
Substitutes:
FW	12	(Hungary) László Gyenti	(substituted on) 62'
Manager:
(Hungary) Ferenc Kovács

GK	1	(Spain) Miguel Ángel
RB	2	(Spain) Chendo
CB	5	(Spain) Manolo Sanchís
CB	6	(Spain) Isidoro San José
LB	3	(Spain) José Antonio Camacho
RM	8	(Spain) Míchel
CM	4	(West Germany) Uli Stielike
LM	10	(Spain) Ricardo Gallego
RF	7	(Spain) Emilio Butragueño	(substituted off) 80'
CF	9	(Spain) Santillana (c)	(substituted off) 86'
LF	11	(Argentina) Jorge Valdano
Substitutes:
RF	15	(Spain) Juanito	(substituted on) 80'
CB	12	(Spain) José Antonio Salguero	(substituted on) 86'
Manager:
(Spain) Luis Molowny

=== Second leg ===
22 May 1985

Real Madrid (Spain)	0–1	(Hungary) Videoton
	Report Overview (archive) Overview	Májer 86'

Santiago Bernabéu, Madrid
Attendance: 98,300
Referee: Alexis Ponnet (Belgium)

Real Madrid	Videoton

GK	1	(Spain) Miguel Ángel
RB	2	(Spain) Chendo
CB	5	(Spain) Manolo Sanchís
CB	6	(Spain) Isidoro San José
LB	3	(Spain) José Antonio Camacho
RM	8	(Spain) Míchel
CM	4	(West Germany) Uli Stielike
LM	10	(Spain) Ricardo Gallego
RF	7	(Spain) Emilio Butragueño
CF	9	(Spain) Santillana (c)
LF	11	(Argentina) Jorge Valdano	(substituted off) 57'
Substitutes:
RF	15	(Spain) Juanito	(substituted on) 57'
Manager:
(Spain) Luis Molowny

GK	1	(Hungary) Péter Disztl
DF	2	(Hungary) József Csuhay
DF	3	(Hungary) László Disztl
DF	4	(Hungary) Tibor Végh
DF	5	(Hungary) Gábor Horváth
MF	6	(Hungary) Győző Burcsa
MF	7	(Hungary) Ferenc Csongrádi (c)	(substituted off) 57'
MF	8	(Hungary) Imre Vadász
FW	9	(Hungary) József Szabó
FW	10	(Hungary) Lajos Májer
FW	11	(Hungary) György Novath	(substituted off) 51'
Substitutes:
MF	12	(Hungary) István Palkovics	(substituted on) 57'
MF	14	(Hungary) Géza Wittman	(substituted on) 51'
Manager:
(Hungary) Ferenc Kovács

== See also ==
- 1985 European Cup final
- 1985 European Cup Winners' Cup final
- Fehérvár FC in European football
- Real Madrid CF in international football competitions
- 1984–85 Real Madrid CF season
