= Disztl =

Disztl is a Hungarian surname. Notable people with the surname include:

- Dávid Disztl (born 1985), Hungarian forward striker footballer
- László Disztl (born 1962), Hungarian footballer
- Péter Disztl (born 1960), Hungarian footballer
