= 1984–85 Nemzeti Bajnokság I =

Nemzeti Bajnokság I
- Season: 1984–85

Statistics of Nemzeti Bajnokság I in the 1984–85 season.

== Overview ==
It was contested by 16 teams, and Budapest Honvéd FC won the championship, successfully defending their title under coach Imre Komora.

Honvéd won their first back-to-back championship in 30 years. The south Pest side won the league with a comfortable 10-point lead, with none of the other 15 teams posing too much of a threat to the ted and blacks' title defense. Runners-up Győr defeated Honvéd 1–0 in gameday 4, and were only 2 points off Honvéd by the time of the winter break. Throughout the spring, losses to Vasas, Honvéd, Pécs and Ferencváros rendered Győri-ETO to become hopeless in the title-race, while Honvéd went on an 11-game winning streak between December and April.

== League standings ==
| Pos | Team | Pld | W | D | L | GF | GA | GD | Pts | Qualification or relegation |
|---|---|---|---|---|---|---|---|---|---|---|
| 1 | Budapest Honvéd (C) | 30 | 20 | 6 | 4 | 63 | 25 | +38 | 46 | Qualification for European Cup first round |
| 2 | Rába ETO Győr | 30 | 15 | 6 | 9 | 57 | 49 | +8 | 36 | Qualification for UEFA Cup first round |
| 3 | Videoton | 30 | 14 | 8 | 8 | 43 | 28 | +15 | 36 | Qualification for UEFA Cup first round |
| 4 | Zalaegerszeg | 30 | 13 | 8 | 9 | 38 | 31 | +7 | 34 | |
| 5 | Vasas | 30 | 10 | 11 | 9 | 56 | 44 | +12 | 31 | |
| 6 | Békéscsaba | 30 | 12 | 6 | 12 | 42 | 53 | −11 | 30 | |
| 7 | Csepel | 30 | 10 | 10 | 10 | 23 | 27 | −4 | 30 | |
| 8 | Debreceni MVSC | 30 | 11 | 8 | 11 | 35 | 33 | +2 | 30 | |
| 9 | Haladás | 30 | 10 | 9 | 11 | 32 | 34 | −2 | 29 | |
| 10 | Újpesti Dózsa | 30 | 10 | 8 | 12 | 37 | 35 | +2 | 28 | |
| 11 | Pécs | 30 | 9 | 10 | 11 | 33 | 35 | −2 | 28 | |
| 12 | Tatabányai Bányász | 30 | 11 | 6 | 13 | 44 | 47 | −3 | 28 | Qualification for Cup Winners' Cup first round |
| 13 | Ferencváros | 30 | 11 | 6 | 13 | 34 | 38 | −4 | 28 | |
| 14 | MTK-VM | 30 | 11 | 5 | 14 | 44 | 45 | −1 | 27 | |
| 15 | Eger (R) | 30 | 10 | 5 | 15 | 26 | 42 | −16 | 25 | Relegation to Nemzeti Bajnokság II |
| 16 | Szeged (R) | 30 | 6 | 2 | 22 | 32 | 73 | −41 | 14 | Relegation to Nemzeti Bajnokság II |

Source: rsssf.com
(C) Champions; (R) Relegated

== Results ==
| Home \ Away | BÉK | CSE | DEB | EGE | FTC | HAL | HON | MTK | PÉC | GYŐ | SZE | TAT | VAS | VID | ÚJP | ZTE |
|---|---|---|---|---|---|---|---|---|---|---|---|---|---|---|---|---|
| Békéscsaba | | 3–1 | 2–1 | 2–1 | 3–1 | 1–1 | 0–1 | 2–0 | 2–1 | 1–1 | 3–2 | 1–0 | 0–1 | 0–0 | 4–2 | 2–2 |
| Csepel | 3–0 | | 0–1 | 1–0 | 0–0 | 0–0 | 0–0 | 2–0 | 1–0 | 1–5 | 3–0 | 3–1 | 1–1 | 0–0 | 2–1 | 1–0 |
| Debreceni MVSC | 3–5 | 0–0 | | 3–0 | 1–0 | 1–2 | 1–0 | 1–1 | 1–2 | 2–0 | 2–0 | 1–0 | 1–2 | 1–0 | 1–1 | 2–1 |
| Eger | 3–0 | 1–0 | 0–0 | | 1–2 | 2–1 | 0–1 | 1–0 | 1–0 | 2–2 | 2–0 | 1–0 | 0–0 | 1–3 | 3–1 | 0–4 |
| Ferencváros | 0–1 | 1–1 | 2–0 | 1–0 | | 0–0 | 0–3 | 2–1 | 0–1 | 5–2 | 4–1 | 0–2 | 1–0 | 0–1 | 0–2 | 1–0 |
| Haladás | 3–3 | 1–0 | 1–0 | 1–2 | 0–1 | | 0–3 | 1–0 | 2–0 | 0–2 | 5–0 | 3–1 | 1–1 | 0–2 | 1–0 | 1–0 |
| Budapest Honvéd | 5–1 | 4–0 | 2–1 | 2–1 | 2–1 | 1–0 | | 2–1 | 2–2 | 4–0 | 3–0 | 6–3 | 1–1 | 0–1 | 2–4 | 3–1 |
| MTK-VM | 3–0 | 0–2 | 1–0 | 3–0 | 1–0 | 1–1 | 2–4 | | 3–1 | 3–1 | 7–0 | 2–1 | 2–1 | 0–0 | 1–1 | 0–1 |
| Pécs | 1–1 | 0–0 | 1–2 | 1–1 | 1–1 | 3–2 | 1–1 | 1–3 | | 1–1 | 3–0 | 3–2 | 2–2 | 0–0 | 1–0 | 0–0 |
| Rába ETO Győr | 3–1 | 2–0 | 1–0 | 5–0 | 5–1 | 1–3 | 1–0 | 4–2 | 0–2 | | 4–1 | 1–2 | 3–1 | 2–1 | 0–3 | 2–1 |
| Szeged | 0–1 | 2–0 | 1–1 | 0–0 | 2–1 | 2–0 | 0–1 | 4–1 | 2–1 | 1–2 | | 0–1 | 5–4 | 2–3 | 1–3 | 0–1 |
| Tatabányai Bányász | 2–0 | 1–0 | 1–2 | 2–0 | 1–4 | 0–0 | 0–3 | 4–3 | 3–1 | 2–2 | 3–0 | | 1–1 | 2–2 | 2–2 | 2–0 |
| Vasas | 3–0 | 3–0 | 4–4 | 3–1 | 1–1 | 3–0 | 2–2 | 1–1 | 0–2 | 5–0 | 6–2 | 1–4 | | 2–0 | 2–2 | 3–1 |
| Videoton | 4–1 | 0–0 | 2–2 | 3–1 | 2–2 | 2–0 | 1–2 | 4–0 | 0–1 | 1–2 | 1–0 | 3–0 | 3–1 | | 3–2 | 0–1 |
| Újpesti Dózsa | 2–1 | 0–1 | 1–0 | 0–1 | 0–1 | 1–1 | 0–0 | 0–1 | 1–0 | 1–1 | 3–1 | 1–0 | 2–1 | 0–1 | | 0–1 |
| Zalaegerszeg | 3–1 | 0–0 | 0–0 | 1–0 | 3–1 | 1–1 | 0–3 | 3–1 | 1–0 | 2–2 | 4–3 | 1–1 | 1–0 | 3–0 | 1–1 | |

Source: rsssf.com
Legend: Blue = home team win; Yellow = draw; Red = away team win.

== Statistical leaders ==
=== Top goalscorers ===
| Rank | Scorer | Club | Goals |
|---|---|---|---|
| 1 | (Hungary) Lajos Détári | Budapest Honvéd | 18 |
| 1 | (Hungary) József Kiprich | Tatabányai Bányász | 18 |
| 3 | (Hungary) Péter Hannich | Rába ETO | 13 |
| 3 | (Hungary) László Kiss | Vasas SC | 13 |
| 3 | (Hungary) József Szabó | Videoton SC | 13 |
| 6 | (Hungary) Imre Boda | MTK-VM | 12 |
| 6 | (Hungary) Lázár Szentes | Rába ETO | 12 |
| 8 | (Hungary) Béla Bodonyi | Budapest Honvéd | 11 |
| 9 | (Hungary) Győző Burcsa | Videoton SC | 10 |
| 9 | (Hungary) Imre Fodor | MTK-VM | 10 |
| 9 | (Hungary) Ferenc Mészáros | Pécsi MSC | 10 |
| 9 | (Hungary) Béla Mörtel | Debreceni MVSC | 10 |

== Attendances ==
Average home league attendance top 3:

| # | Club | Average |
|---|---|---|
| 1 | Ferencváros | 21,200 |
| 2 | Győr | 13,067 |
| 3 | Debrecen | 8,900 |
