= Alan Hart =

Alan Hart may refer to:

- Alan Hart (footballer) (born 1956), English former footballer
- Alan Hart (television executive) (1935–2021), British television executive
- Alan Hart (writer) (1942–2018), British journalist
- Alan L. Hart (1890–1962), American physician
