= Tony Mitchell =

Tony Mitchell may refer to:

- Tony Mitchell (basketball, born 1989), basketball player formerly of the University of Alabama
- Tony Mitchell (basketball, born 1992), 2013 NBA Draft selection out of the University of North Texas
- Tony Mitchell (director) (born 1961), Canadian-British film and television director
- Tony Mitchell (musician) (born 1951), Australian musician
- Tony Mitchell (footballer) (born 1956), English footballer
- Tony Mitchell (physician), British physician and medical academic
- Tony Mitchell (fencer), Scottish fencer

== See also ==
- Anthony Mitchell (disambiguation)
- Tony Michell (born 1947), British businessman
