= József Csuhay =

Hungarian footballer

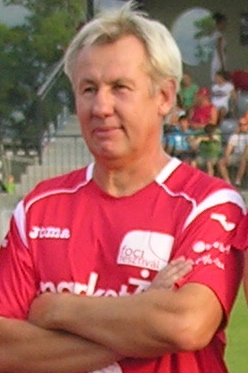
- Csuhay in 2011

Personal information
- Full name: József Csuhay
- Date of birth: 12 May 1957 (age 69)
- Place of birth: Eger, Hungary

Senior career*
Years	Team	Apps	(Gls)
- Videoton

International career
1983–1988	Hungary	11	(0)
- * Club domestic league appearances and goals

József Csuhay (born 12 July 1957) is a Hungarian retired footballer who played as a defender.

During his club career he played for Videoton FC Fehérvár, including both legs of the 1985 UEFA Cup Final, where they lost to Real Madrid 1–3 on aggregate. He took part in both the 1982 FIFA World Cup and the 1986 FIFA World Cup for the Hungary national football team.
