= Jan Korte =

Jan Korte may refer to:

- Jan Korte (footballer) (born 1956), Dutch footballer
- Jan Korte (politician) (born 1977), German politician
