= Michel Vautrot =

French football referee (born 1945)

- Full name: Michel Jean Maurice Vautrot
- Born: 23 October 1945 (age 81); Saint-Vit, Doubs, France

Domestic
Years	League	Role
1973–1991	French First Division	Referee

International
Years	League	Role
1975–1990	FIFA-listed	Referee

Michel Jean Maurice Vautrot (French: [miʃɛl votʁo]; born 23 October 1945) is a French former football referee. He is mostly known for officiating five matches in the FIFA World Cup: two in 1982 and three in 1990.

== Career ==
Vautrot refereed the Intercontinental Cup final (the predecessor of the FIFA Club World Cup) in 1983 at National Stadium Tokyo between Hamburg S.V. (West Germany) and Grêmio F.B.P.A. (Brazil). In addition to officiating five World Cup matches across two tournaments between 1982 and 1990, he also refereed three matches in the European Championship, one in 1984 and two in 1988, including the final between the Soviet Union and the Netherlands.

Additionally, Vautrot refereed the first leg of the 1985 UEFA Cup final between Videoton and Real Madrid, and the 1986 European Cup Final between Steaua Bucharest and Barcelona.

In 1986, Roma president Dino Viola was banned by UEFA for attempting to bribe referee Vautrot with £50,000 prior to the European Cup semi-final 2nd leg between Roma and Dundee United in 1984. Roma later lost the final at their home ground, the Stadio Olimpico in Rome, on penalties to Liverpool.

In the 1990 FIFA World Cup semi-final between hosts Italy and reigning champions Argentina, Vautrot mistakenly played 8 extra minutes in the first period of extra time. He later explained that he had forgotten to check his watch. Argentina won the match on penalties following a 1–1 draw.

== Major matches refereed ==
Date	Match	Tournament	Venue	Result	Ref
11 December 1983	Hamburger SV vs. Grêmio FBPA	1983 Intercontinental Cup final	National Stadium, Tokyo	1–2 (a.e.t.)	
8 May 1985	Videoton vs. Real Madrid	1985 UEFA Cup final (first leg)	Sóstói Stadion, Székesfehérvár	0–3 (1–3 on aggregate)	
7 May 1986	Barcelona vs. Steaua Bucharest	1986 European Cup final	Ramón Sánchez-Pizjuán Stadium, Seville	0–0 (0–2 on penalties)	
25 June 1988	Soviet Union vs. Netherlands	UEFA Euro 1988 final	Olympiastadion, Munich	0–2	

== Honours ==
Awards

- IFFHS World's Best Referee: 1988, 1989

Orders

- Knight of the National Order of Merit: 1983
- Officer of the National Order of Merit: 1996
- Knight of the Legion of Honour: 2006
