= Tibor Végh =

Hungarian footballer

Personal information
- Full name: Tibor Végh
- Date of birth: 31 March 1956 (age 70)
- Place of birth: Székesfehérvár, Hungary
- Position: Defender

Senior career*
Years	Team	Apps	(Gls)
1974–1989	Videoton	420	(7)
1989	Szombathelyi Haladás	7	(0)
1989–1990	USC Kirschschlag		
1990	Veszprém	3	(0)
1990–1991	MTK Budapest	8	(0)

International career
1987	Hungary	1	(0)
- * Club domestic league appearances and goals

Tibor Végh (born 31 March 1956 in Székesfehérvár) is a retired Hungarian footballer who played as a defender. He had one cap when on the Hungary national football team in 1987.
