= Lajos Májer =

Hungarian footballer

Personal information
- Full name: Lajos Májer
- Date of birth: 14 August 1956
- Place of birth: Sárbogárd, Hungary
- Date of death: 11 March 1998 (aged 41)
- Place of death: Székesfehérvár, Hungary
- Position: Forward

Youth career
- 1970–1972: Sárbogárdi Volán
- 1972–1974: Videoton

Senior career*
Years	Team	Apps	(Gls)
1974–1987	Videoton	289	(54)
1987	Rába ETO		
1987–1988	Videoton	16	(2)
1988–1989	ASK Bruck		
1989	TSV Straubing		
1990	SC Bruck		
1990	Velencetours SC		

International career
1976–1979	Hungary	3	(0)
- * Club domestic league appearances and goals

Lajos Májer (14 August 1956 – 11 March 1998) was a Hungarian professional footballer who played as a forward.

== Career ==
=== Club career ===
He spent the majority of his career at Videoton, where he reached the 1985 UEFA Cup Final.

=== International career ===
Májer was capped three times for Hungary. He made his national team debut on 17 April 1976 in a friendly against Yugoslavia, a 0–0 away tie. His last cap came on 26 October 1979 in another friendly versus the United States, a 0–2 home loss.

== Death ==
Májer, aged 41, died in a car accident on 11 March 1998.
