= Anthony Mitchell =

Anthony Mitchell may refer to:

- Anthony Mitchell (journalist) (died 2007), journalist for the Associated Press
- Anthony Mitchell (bishop) (1868–1917), bishop of Aberdeen and Orkney
- Anthony Mitchell (American football) (born 1974), former American football safety
- Anthony A. Mitchell (1918–2009), American conductor and clarinetist
- Anthony Mitchell (rugby league) (born 1989), Australian rugby league player

== See also ==
- Tony Mitchell (disambiguation)
