= Fehérvár FC in European football =

Fehérvár Football Club, previously called Videoton FC, is a professional Hungarian football club based in Székesfehérvár, Hungary.

== Matches ==
Fehérvár score listed first.

=== UEFA-organised seasonal competitions ===
==== Champions League ====
Season	Round	Opposition	Home	Away	Aggregate
2011–12	Second qualifying round	(Austria) Sturm Graz	3–2	0–2	3–4
2015–16	Second qualifying round	(Wales) The New Saints	1–1 (a.e.t.)	1–0	2–1
2015–16	Third qualifying round	(Belarus) BATE Borisov	1–1	0–1	1–2
2018–19	First qualifying round	(Luxembourg) Dudelange	2−1	1−1	3−2
2018–19	Second qualifying round	(Bulgaria) Ludogorets Razgrad	1–0	0–0	1–0
2018–19	Third qualifying round	(Sweden) Malmö	0–0	1–1	1–1 (a)
2018–19	Play-off round	(Greece) AEK Athens	1–2	1–1	2–3

==== UEFA Cup and Europa League ====
Season	Round	Opposition	Home	Away	Aggregate
1974–75	First round	(Italy) Napoli	1–1	0–2	1–3
1976–77	First round	(Turkey) Fenerbahçe	4–0	1–2	5–2
1976–77	Second round	(Austria) Wacker Innsbruck	1–0	1–1	2–1
1976–77	Third round	(East Germany) Magdeburg	1–0	0–5	1–5
1981–82	First round	(Austria) Rapid Wien	0–2	2–2	2–4
1984–85	First round	(Czechoslovakia) Dukla Prague	1–0	0–0	1–0
1984–85	Second round	(France) Paris Saint-Germain	1–0	4–2	5–2
1984–85	Third round	(Socialist Federal Republic of Yugoslavia) Partizan	5–0	0–2	5–2
1984–85	Quarter-finals	(England) Manchester United	1–0	0–1	1–1 (5–4 p)
1984–85	Semi-finals	(Socialist Federal Republic of Yugoslavia) Željezničar	3–1	1–2	4–3
1984–85	Final	(Spain) Real Madrid	0–3	1–0	1–3
1985–86	First round	(Sweden) Malmö	1–0	2–3	3–3 (a)
1985–86	Second round	(Poland) Legia Warsaw	0–1	1–1	1–2
1989–90	First round	(Scotland) Hibernian	0–3	0–1	0–4
2006–07	First qualifying round	(Kazakhstan) Kairat	1–0	1–2	2–2 (a)
2006–07	Second qualifying round	(Switzerland) Grasshoppers	1–1	0–2	1–3
2010–11	Second qualifying round	(Slovenia) Maribor	1–1	0–2	1–3
2012–13	Second qualifying round	(Slovakia) Slovan Bratislava	0–0	1–1	1–1 (a)
2012–13	Third qualifying round	(Belgium) Gent	1–0	3–0	4–0
2012–13	Play-off round	(Turkey) Trabzonspor	0–0	0–0	0–0 (4–2 p)
2012–13	Group G	(Portugal) Sporting	3–0	1–2	3rd of 4
2012–13	Group G	(Switzerland) Basel	2–1	0–1	3rd of 4
2012–13	Group G	(Belgium) Genk	0–1	0–3	3rd of 4
2013–14	First qualifying round	(Montenegro) Mladost Podgorica	2–1	0–1	2–2 (a)
2015–16	Play-off round	(Poland) Lech Poznań	0–1	0–3	0–4
2016–17	First qualifying round	(Moldova) Zaria Bălți	3–0	0–2	3–2
2016–17	Second qualifying round	(Serbia) Čukarički	2–0	1–1	3–1
2016–17	Third qualifying round	(Denmark) Midtjylland	0–1	1–1 (a.e.t.)	1–2
2017–18	First qualifying round	(Malta) Balzan	2–0	3–3	5–3
2017–18	Second qualifying round	(Estonia) Nõmme Kalju	1–1	3–0	4–1
2017–18	Third qualifying round	(France) Bordeaux	1–0	1–2	2–2 (a)
2017–18	Play-off round	(Serbia) Partizan	0–4	0–0	0–4
2018–19	Group L	(England) Chelsea	2–2	0–1	3rd of 4
2018–19	Group L	(Greece) PAOK	1–0	2–0	3rd of 4
2018–19	Group L	(Belarus) BATE Borisov	0–2	0–2	3rd of 4
2019–20	First qualifying round	(Montenegro) Zeta	0–0	5–1	5–1
2019–20	Second qualifying round	(Liechtenstein) Vaduz	1–0	0–2	1–2
2020–21	First qualifying round	(Republic of Ireland) Bohemians	1–1 (4–2 p)	—	—
2020–21	Second qualifying round	(Malta) Hibernians	—	1–0	—
2020–21	Third qualifying round	(France) Reims	0–0 (4–1 p)	—	—
2020–21	Play-off round	(Belgium) Standard Liège	—	1–3	—

==== UEFA Europa Conference League ====
Season	Round	Opposition	Home	Away	Aggregate
2021–22	First qualifying round	(Armenia) Ararat Yerevan	1–1	0–2	1–3
2022–23	Second qualifying round	(Azerbaijan) Gabala	4–1	1–2	5−3
2022–23	Third qualifying round	(Moldova) Petrocub Hîncești	5–0	2–1	7–1
2022–23	Play-off round	(Germany) Köln	0–3	2–1	2–4
2024–25	Second qualifying round	(Azerbaijan) Sumgayit	0–0	2–1	2−1
2024–25	Third qualifying round	(Cyprus) Omonia	0–2	0–1	0–3

==== UEFA Intertoto Cup ====
Season	Round	Opposition	Home	Away	Aggregate
2003	First round	(Bulgaria) Marek Dupnitsa	2–2	2–3 (a.e.t.)	4–5

== Overall record ==
As of 06 January 2024

Competition	Played	Won	Drew	Lost	GF	GA	GD	Win%
UEFA Champions League	14	4	7	3	13	13	+0	28.57
UEFA Cup / UEFA Europa League	78	27	20	31	84	89	−5	34.62
UEFA Europa Conference League	8	4	1	3	15	11	+4	50.00
UEFA Intertoto Cup	2	0	1	1	4	5	−1	0.00
Total	102	35	29	38	116	118	−2	34.31

Legend: GF = Goals For. GA = Goals Against. GD = Goal Difference.

== Record by country of opposition ==
- Correct as of 14 August 2018

Country	Pld	W	D	L	GF	GA	GD	Win%
Austria	5	1	2	2	4	7	−3	20.00
Belgium	4	2	0	2	4	4	+0	50.00
Belarus	2	0	1	1	1	2	−1	0.00
Bulgaria	4	1	2	1	5	5	+0	25.00
Czechoslovakia	2	1	1	0	1	0	+1	50.00
Denmark	2	0	1	1	1	2	−1	0.00
East Germany	2	1	1	0	1	0	+1	50.00
England	2	1	0	1	1	1	+0	50.00
Estonia	2	1	1	0	4	1	+3	50.00
France	4	3	1	0	7	4	+3	75.00
Greece	1	0	0	1	1	2	−1	0.00
Italy	2	0	1	1	1	3	−2	0.00
Kazakhstan	2	1	0	1	2	2	+0	50.00
(Luxembourg) Luxemburg	2	1	1	0	3	2	+1	50.00
Malta	2	1	1	0	5	3	+2	50.00
Moldova	2	1	0	1	3	2	+1	50.00
Montenegro	2	1	0	1	2	2	+0	50.00
Poland	2	0	1	1	1	2	−1	0.00
Portugal	2	1	0	1	4	2	+2	50.00
Scotland	2	0	0	2	0	4	−4	0.00
Serbia	4	1	2	1	3	5	−2	25.00
Slovakia	2	0	2	0	1	1	+0	0.00
Slovenia	2	0	1	1	1	3	−2	0.00
Spain	2	1	0	1	1	3	−2	50.00
Sweden	4	1	2	1	3	3	+0	25.00
Switzerland	4	1	1	2	3	5	−2	25.00
Turkey	4	1	2	1	5	2	+3	25.00
Wales	2	1	1	0	2	1	+1	50.00
(Socialist Federal Republic of Yugoslavia) Yugoslavia	4	2	0	2	9	5	+4	50.00

P – Played; W – Won; D – Drawn; L – Lost

== Club record in UEFA competitions ==
As correct of 14 August 2018.

- Biggest win: 28/11/1984, Videoton 5–0 (Socialist Federal Republic of Yugoslavia) FK Partizan, Székesfehérvár
- Biggest defeat: 24/11/1976, (East Germany) 1. FC Magdeburg 5–0 Videoton, Magdeburg
- Appearances in UEFA Champions League: 3
- Appearances in UEFA Europa League: 10
- Appearances in UEFA Intertoto Cup: 1
- Player with most UEFA appearances: 35 (Hungary) / (Brazil) Vinícius
- Top scorers in UEFA club competitions: 10 (Hungary) Szabó
