= László Disztl =

Hungarian footballer

Personal information
- Date of birth: 4 June 1962 (age 64)
- Place of birth: Baja, Hungary
- Height: 1.80 m (5 ft 11 in)
- Position: Right-back

Senior career*
Years	Team	Apps	(Gls)
1980–1987	Videoton	189	(4)
1987–1989	Honvéd	59	(0)
1989–1994	Club Brugge	99	(6)
1994–1995	Videoton	13	(0)
Total		360	(10)

International career
1984–1993	Hungary	28	(1)

Managerial career
- 1997–1998: Videoton
- 1999–2000: Zalaegerszeg
- 2000: Veszprém
- 2000–2001: MTK (youth)
- 2002: BKV Előre
- 2003–2005: Móri SE
- 2005–2007: Videoton (assistant)
- 2008–2009: Videoton
- 2008–2016: Videoton (youth director)
- 2016–2017: Videoton II
- 2017: BFC Siófok
- 2019–2021: Kaposvár (assistant)
- * Club domestic league appearances and goals

László Disztl (born 4 June 1962) is a Hungarian former professional footballer who played mainly as a right-back. He is the assistant manager of Kaposvári Rákóczi FC.

== Career ==
Disztl was born in Baja. During his career he played mainly for Videoton FC, and was an important member of the team which eventually finished runner-up in the 1984–85 UEFA Cup, to Real Madrid.

After two years with Budapest Honvéd, Disztl moved abroad, to Belgium's Club Brugge, and closed his career at 33 with his first club, which he briefly managed in 2008.

Disztl gained 28 caps for Hungary and, like his brother Péter, appeared at the 1986 FIFA World Cup. His only international goal came against Italy on 17 October 1990, for the UEFA Euro 1992 qualifiers (1–1 home draw).

== Honours ==
Videoton

- UEFA Cup: Runner-up 1984–85

Club Brugge

- Belgian Pro League: 1989–90, 1991–92
- Belgian Cup: 1990–91
- Belgian Supercup: 1990, 1991, 1992, 1994
- Bruges Matins: 1990, 1992, 1993
