= Ken Ayres =

English footballer

Personal information
- Full name: Kenneth Edward Ayres
- Date of birth: 15 May 1956 (age 70)
- Place of birth: Oxford, England
- Height: 5 ft 8 in (1.73 m)
- Position: Forward

Senior career*
Years	Team	Apps	(Gls)
1973–1974	Manchester United		
1974–1975	Crystal Palace	6	(0)
- IF Fram Larvik

International career
1971	England Schoolboys	5	(0)
- * Club domestic league appearances and goals

Kenneth Edward Ayres (born 15 May 1956, in Oxford, UK) is an English former professional footballer who played in the Football League, as a forward. He started out as an apprentice with Manchester United and received a professional contract with the club at the age of 17, but left a year later. He signed for Crystal Palace in November 1973, where he played six times for the Selhurst Park side in the Third Division during the 1974–75 season, his only League appearances. His contract was cancelled in April 1976 and he subsequently played in Norway for IF Fram Larvik.
