= Péter Disztl =

Hungarian footballer

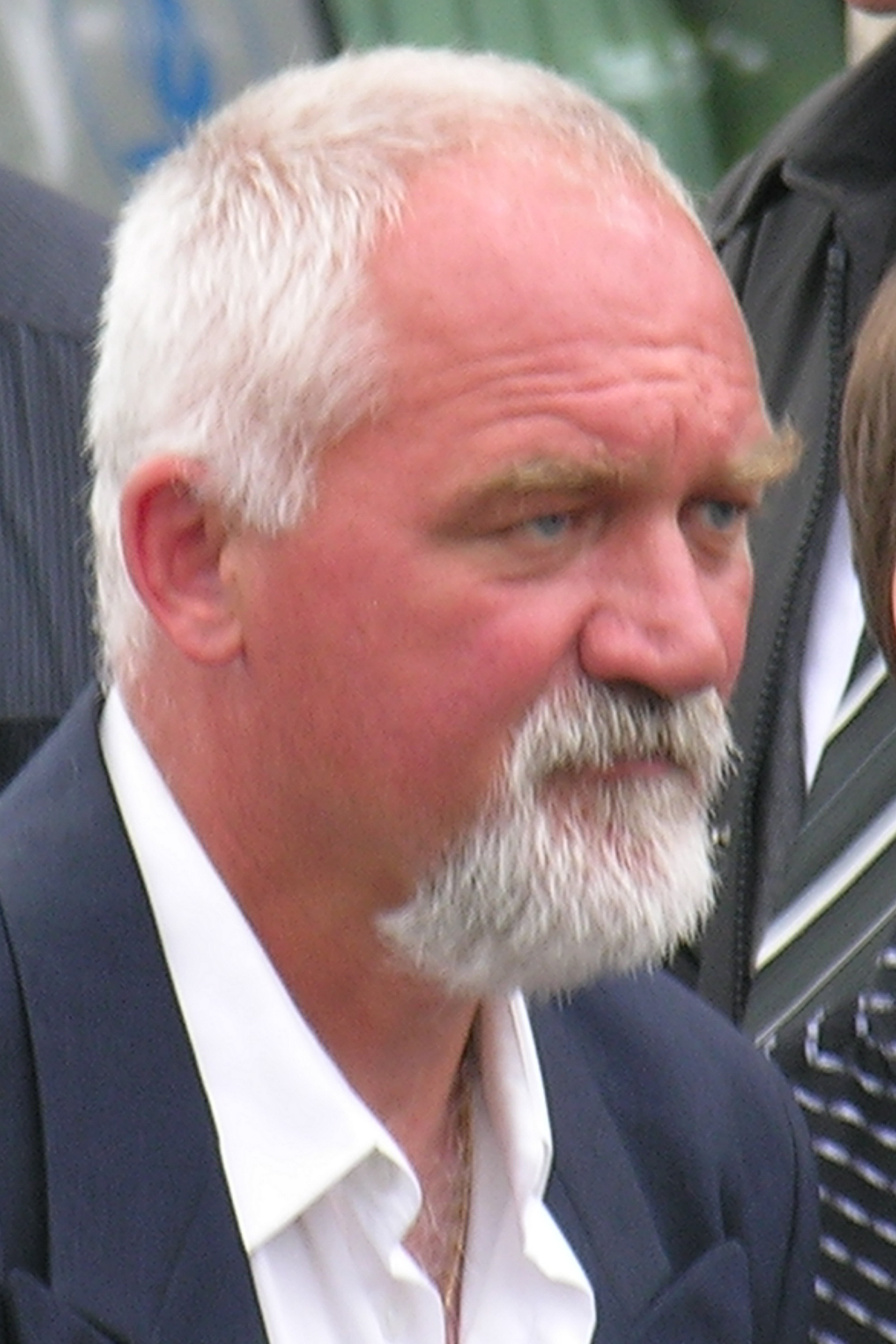
- Disztl at Bertalan Bicskei's funeral

Personal information
- Date of birth: 30 March 1960 (age 66)
- Place of birth: Baja, Hungary
- Height: 1.88 m (6 ft 2 in)
- Position: Goalkeeper

Youth career
- Videoton

Senior career*
Years	Team	Apps	(Gls)
1977–1987	Videoton	227	(0)
1987–1990	Honvéd	90	(0)
1990–1992	Rot-Weiß Erfurt	45	(0)
1992	VfB Leipzig	11	(0)
1993	Selangor	0	(0)
1993–1994	BVSC Budapest	16	(0)
1994	Győri ETO	6	(0)
1995	Veszprémi	5	(0)
1995–1996	Parmalat FC	27	(0)
1996	Haladás	5	(0)
1996–1997	Pécsi Mecsek	11	(0)
Total		438	(0)

International career
1984–1989	Hungary	37	(0)
- * Club domestic league appearances and goals

Péter Disztl (born 30 March 1960) is a Hungarian retired footballer who played as a goalkeeper.

== Club career ==
Born in Baja, Disztl's main club was Videoton FC, and he was one of the side's top performers as it made it to the 1984–85 UEFA Cup final, in an eventual 1–3 aggregate loss against Real Madrid; after a 0–3 home loss, he saved a penalty from Jorge Valdano in the opening minutes of the second leg at the Santiago Bernabéu, being crucial to secure the consolation win.

After two seasons in Germany, the first in the final year of the former German Democratic Republic league in the already reunified country, the second in second division, and one in Malaysia, Disztl returned home, closing out his career in 1997 after short spells with six teams.

== International career ==
Disztl made his debut for the Hungarian national team in 1984, and won a further 36 caps in the following five years. He was a participant at the 1986 FIFA World Cup in Mexico, where the country failed to progress from the group stage.

After his retirement, Disztl was charged for some years with the coaching of the national side's goalkeepers.
