= Allan Marley =

English footballer

Personal information
- Date of birth: 29 February 1956 (age 70)
- Place of birth: Durham, England
- Height: 5 ft 8 in (1.73 m)
- Position: Full-back

Senior career*
Years	Team	Apps	(Gls)
1973–1976	Grimsby Town	40	(2)
1976–1978	Louth United		
1978–19??	Brisbane City		
- * Club domestic league appearances and goals

Allan Marley (born 29 February 1956) is an English former professional footballer who played as a full-back in the United Kingdom and Australia.
