= Jean-Paul Defrang =

Luxembourgish footballer (1956–2026)

Personal information
- Full name: Jean-Paul Defrang
- Date of birth: 22 June 1956
- Date of death: October 2026 (aged 70)
- Position: Goalkeeper

Senior career*
Years	Team	Apps	(Gls)
1976–1977	Jeunesse Esch		
1977–1991	Progrès Niederkorn		

International career
1983–1984	Luxembourg	6	(0)
- * Club domestic league appearances and goals

Jean-Paul Defrang (22 June 1956 – October 2026) was a Luxembourgish footballer who played as a goalkeeper.

Defrang was a member of the Luxembourg national football team from 1983 to 1984.

Facing Spain, Defrang only conceded one goal in the 0–1 defeat, in snowy conditions.

Later in life he bought a property in Els Poblets, Spain. On 12 October 2026, it was announced that Defrang had died over the previous weekend. He was 70.
