= Alan Hart (footballer) =

English footballer

Personal information
- Date of birth: 21 February 1956 (age 70)
- Place of birth: Woolwich, England
- Height: 1.70 m (5 ft 7 in)
- Position: Midfielder

Youth career
- West Ham United

Senior career*
Years	Team	Apps	(Gls)
1973–1975	Charlton Athletic	3	(2)
1975–1976	Millwall	16	(0)
1976–1977	Dulwich Hamlet	?	(?)
1979–1981	Gravesend & Northfleet	97	(8)
Total		116	(10)
- * Club domestic league appearances and goals

Alan Hart (born 21 February 1956) is an English former professional footballer who played in the Football League, as a midfielder.
