= Jan Korte (footballer) =

Dutch footballer and manager

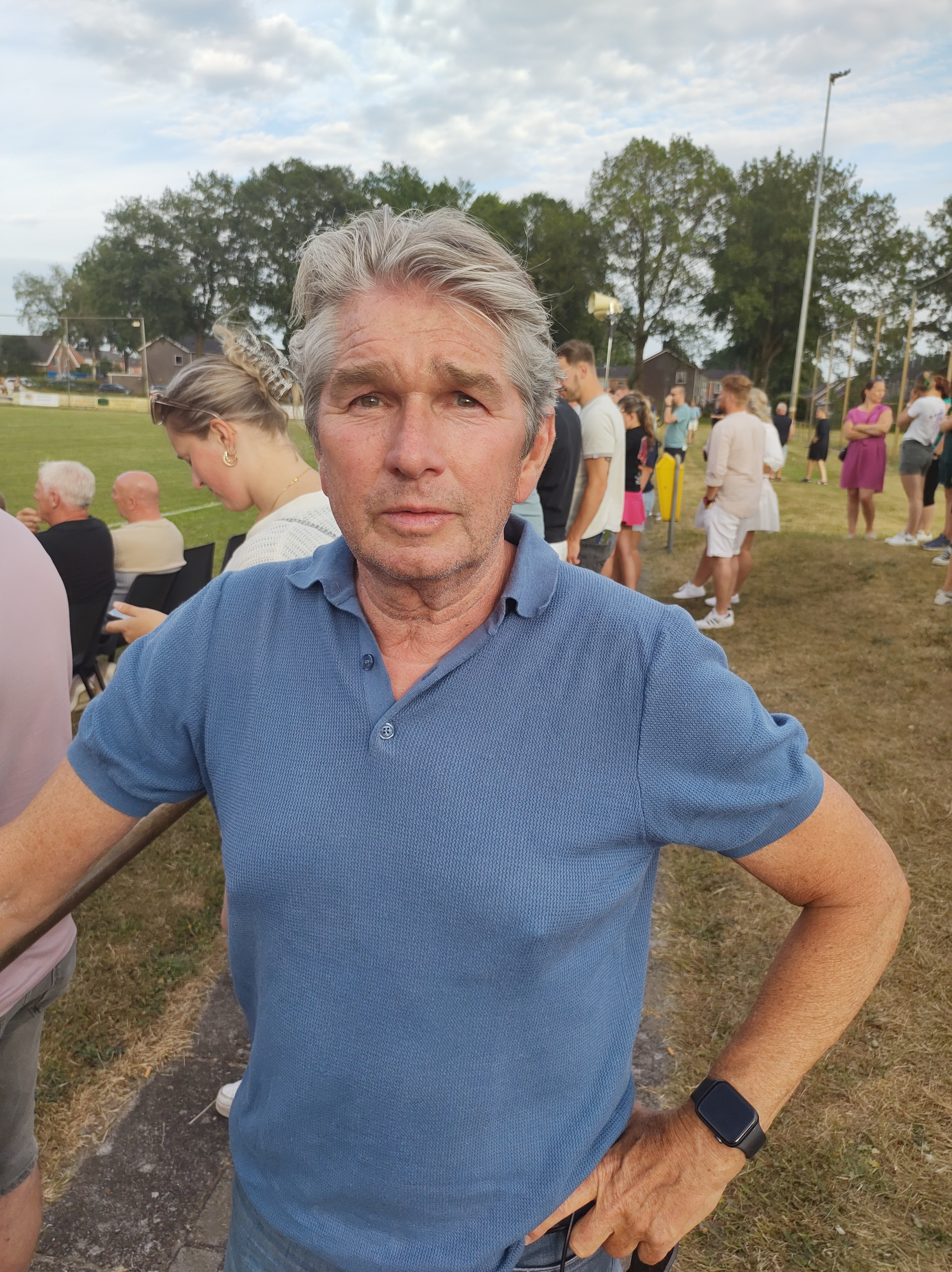

Personal information
- Full name: Johan Korte
- Date of birth: 4 November 1956 (age 69)
- Place of birth: Veendam, Groningen, Netherlands
- Position: Midfielder

Senior career*
Years	Team	Apps	(Gls)
- BV Veendam

Managerial career
- 2002–2005: BV Veendam (head coach)
- * Club domestic league appearances and goals

Johan Korte (born 4 November 1956 in Veendam, Groningen) is a Dutch former football player, who played for BV Veendam and Go Ahead Eagles, and later on became a football manager. He coached BV Veendam for three years (2002–2005).
