= Tony Mitchell (footballer) =

English footballer (born 1956)

Personal information
- Full name: Anthony John Mitchell
- Date of birth: 7 September 1956 (age 70)
- Place of birth: Redruth, England
- Position: Defender

Senior career*
Years	Team	Apps	(Gls)
1976–1977	Leatherhead		
1977–1982	Exeter City	60	(0)
1982–1983	Sutton United		
- * Club domestic league appearances and goals

Anthony John Mitchell (born 7 September 1956) is an English former professional footballer who played in the Football League as a right back.
