= György Mezey =

Hungarian football manager (1941–2025)

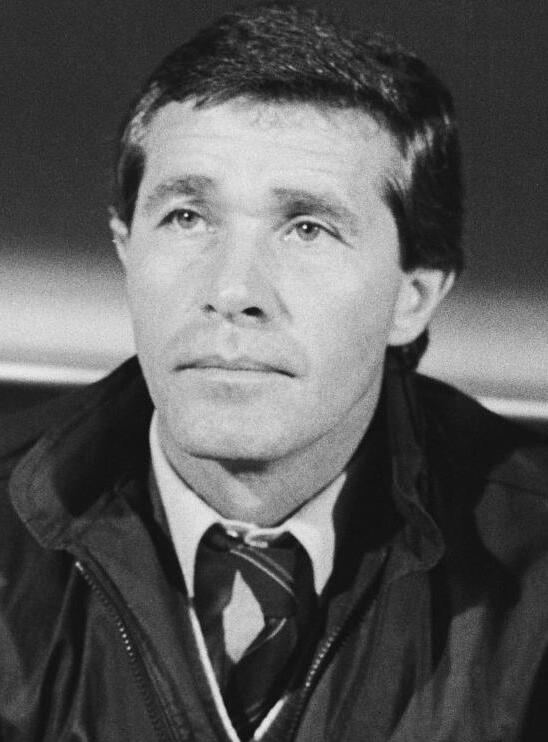
- Mezey in 1984

Personal information
- Date of birth: 7 September 1941
- Place of birth: Topolya, Kingdom of Hungary (present-day Bačka Topola, Serbia)
- Date of death: 8 October 2025 (aged 84)
- Place of death: Kápolnásnyék, Hungary
- Position: Midfielder

Youth career
- 1956–1960: RAC

Senior career*
Years	Team	Apps	(Gls)
1960–1965	TFSE		
1965–1966	Budafoki MTE		
1966	Keszthely		
1966–1967	Budafoki		
1967–1968	MTK		
1968–1971	Budapesti Spartacus		

Managerial career
- 1971–1977: BVSC
- 1977–1980: MTK-VM
- 1983–1986: Hungary
- 1986–1987: Kuwait
- 1987–1988: Al Yarmouk
- 1988: Hungary
- 1989: Hangö IK
- 1990: Videoton
- 1990–1992: Kispest-Honvéd
- 1992–1993: Tadamon
- 1997: BVSC
- 2000–2001: Vasas SC
- 2003: Újpest
- 2008–2011: MOL Fehérvár (technical sports director)
- 2009–2011: MOL Fehérvár
- * Club domestic league appearances and goals

György Mezey (7 September 1941 – 8 October 2025) was a Hungarian football player and manager.

Mezey was coach of the Hungary national team from 1983 to 1986, leading the team to the 1986 FIFA World Cup. During the 2006 FIFA World Cup he was part of FIFA's Technical Study Group.

== Career ==
Mezey was born in Topolya (now Bačka Topola, Serbia) on 7 September 1941. His family moved to Mezőberény in Békés county, and later to Rákoskeresztúr.

In an interview with Nemzeti Sport, Mezey said that Hungary qualified too early for the 1986 FIFA World Cup that resulted in euphoria in Hungary. However, he saw the early signs of the big defeat from the Soviet Union national football team.

One of his former player, Lajos Détári, said in an interview with Nemzeti Sport that Mezey taught the national players a new football system that resulted in huge success in the mid-1980s.

Márton Esterházy said that Mezey was the best coach he ever worked with.

== Death ==
Mezey died in Kápolnásnyék on 8 October 2025, at the age of 84.

His former and other Hungarian clubs also commemorated him after his death, including MTK Budapest FC, Vasas SC, Videoton FC Fehérvár, Budapest Honvéd FC, Újpest FC, Puskás Akadémia FC, and Győri ETO FC. Political figures also posted on their social media saying goodbye to him including András Cser-Palkovics (mayor of Székesfehérvár) and Viktor Orbán (Prime Minister of Hungary).

== Honours ==
=== Manager ===
Budapest Honvéd

- Nemzeti Bajnokság I: 1990–91

Budapesti VSC

- Magyar Kupa runner-up: 1996–97

MOL Fehérvár

- Nemzeti Bajnokság I: 2010–11
- Magyar Kupa runner-up: 2010–11
- Szuperkupa: 2011

=== Individual ===
- Manager of the Year in Hungary: 2009–10

== Sources ==
- Ki kicsoda a magyar sportéletben?, II. kötet (I–R). Szekszárd, Babits Kiadó, 1995, 306. o., ISBN 963-495-011-6 (in Hungarian)
- origo.hu: Mexikótól Matthäusig - Mezey György pályafutása (in Hungarian)
- origo.hu: Interview with Mezey
- Profile on vidi.hu
