= Bartosz Grzelak =

Polish-Swedish football manager

Personal information
- Full name: Bartosz Piotr Grzelak
- Date of birth: 2 November 1978 (age 48)
- Place of birth: Szczecin, Poland
- Position: Midfielder

Youth career
- 1983–1991: Vasalund
- 1992–1993: Brommapojkarna
- 1996: AIK

Senior career*
| Years | Team | Apps | (Gls) |
| 1994–1995 | Brommapojkarna | | |
| 1997 | AIK | 1 | (0) |
| 1998–2004 | Vallentuna | | |
| 2005–2006 | Nybergsund | | |
| 2007 | Frej | | |
| 2007 | Valsta Syrianska | | |
| 2008–2011 | Frej | 73 | (12) |

International career
| 1996 | Sweden U19 | 7 | (0) |

Managerial career
- 2012–2017: Frej
- 2020–2022: AIK
- 2023–2024: Fehérvár
- 2024–2025: Újpest
- 2026: Cracovia
- * Club domestic league appearances and goals

Bartosz Piotr Grzelak (born 2 November 1978) is a professional football manager and former player who played as a midfielder. Born in Poland, he represented Sweden at youth international level. He was most recently the manager of Ekstraklasa club Cracovia.

== Playing career ==
Grzelak made his sole Allsvenskan appearance for AIK on 26 October 1997 in a 1997 Allsvenskan game against Malmö FF when he replaced Johan Mjällby in the last couple of minutes of the game. He was also a Sweden U19 international, appearing in seven games in 1996.

== Managerial career ==
In 2009, Grzelak became playing assistant manager of the small suburban Stockholm club IK Frej when they played in division 2 (fourth tier). He became head coach and sporting director for the club in 2012 when the club was playing in Division 1 Norra (third tier). In 2014, Frej won promotion to Superettan for the first time in club history. The team finished 14th in their debut season (2015) but retained their place after winning the relegation play-offs. In 2016, IK Frej finished in 10th place — their best-ever league finish. Grzelak left the club in the summer of 2017 to join AIK’s coaching staff.

In June 2017, he joined Allsvenskan side AIK as an assistant manager to Rikard Norling. The team finished second behind Malmö FF in the 2017 Allsvenskan. In the 2018 season, AIK won the league, becoming Swedish champions for the 12th time.

In December 2018, he was appointed assistant manager of the Sweden national under-21 team.

In July 2020, he was appointed as AIK's new head coach, following the dismissal of Norling. At the time, the team was in 12th place in Allsvenskan. After a strong second half of the season, AIK finished in 9th place. In the 2021 season, AIK finished second, level on points with Malmö FF, who won the title on goal difference.

In August 2022, Grzelak was dismissed as the head coach of AIK after a string of poor performances in August, including a 3–0 defeat away against 1. FC Slovácko in the 2022–23 UEFA Europa Conference League play-off round, as well as a 1–0 defeat against Kalmar FF and a 2–2 draw against IFK Värnamo in Allsvenskan. At the time, AIK were in 5th place in Allsvenskan.

=== Fehérvár ===
In March 2023, Grzelak became the head coach of Hungarian side Fehérvár. With ten games left in the 2022–23 season and the club sitting in the relegation zone, Grzelak led the team to safety. In the 2023–24 season, Fehérvár finished fourth in the league, securing qualification for the UEFA Conference League.

=== Újpest ===
On 14 June 2024, he was appointed as the manager of Újpest. He debuted with a 2–1 defeat against Puskás Akadémia in the first round of the 2024–25 Nemzeti Bajnokság I at the Szusza Ferenc Stadion. After a disappointing start to the spring phase of the 2025 season, the club announced on 3 May 2025 that he had left his position by mutual consent.

=== Cracovia ===
On 20 April 2026, Grzelak took over as Polish Ekstraklasa club Cracovia's manager after agreeing to a two-year deal. He replaced Luka Elsner, who had left them in 13th in the league table, three points above the relegation zone. He led them to five draws in the five remaining matches of the season; Cracovia finished in 13th place and avoided relegation. On 8 November 2026, two days after a 2–1 Holy War derby loss to Wisła Kraków, Cracovia had announced Grzelak would not continue as the club's manager.

== Personal life ==
Grzelak was born in Szczecin, Polish People's Republic, to Polish parents before moving to Sweden at the age of four.

== Managerial statistics ==
As of match played 6 November 2026

Managerial record by team and tenure
| Team | Nation | From | To | Record | | | | |
| Team | Nation | From | To | G | W | D | L | Win % |
|---|---|---|---|---|---|---|---|---|
| IK Frej | (Sweden) | 1 January 2012 | 25 June 2017 | 167 | 65 | 43 | 59 | 38.92 |
| AIK | (Sweden) | 31 July 2020 | 18 August 2022 | 80 | 41 | 18 | 21 | 51.25 |
| Fehérvár | (Hungary) | 1 March 2023 | 30 June 2024 | 44 | 18 | 11 | 15 | 40.91 |
| Újpest | (Hungary) | 14 June 2024 | 3 May 2025 | 34 | 11 | 12 | 11 | 32.35 |
| Cracovia | (Poland) | 20 April 2026 | 8 November 2026 | 20 | 3 | 9 | 8 | 15.00 |
| Total | | | | 345 | 138 | 93 | 114 | 40.00 |
