= Ferenc Csongrádi =

Hungarian footballer and manager

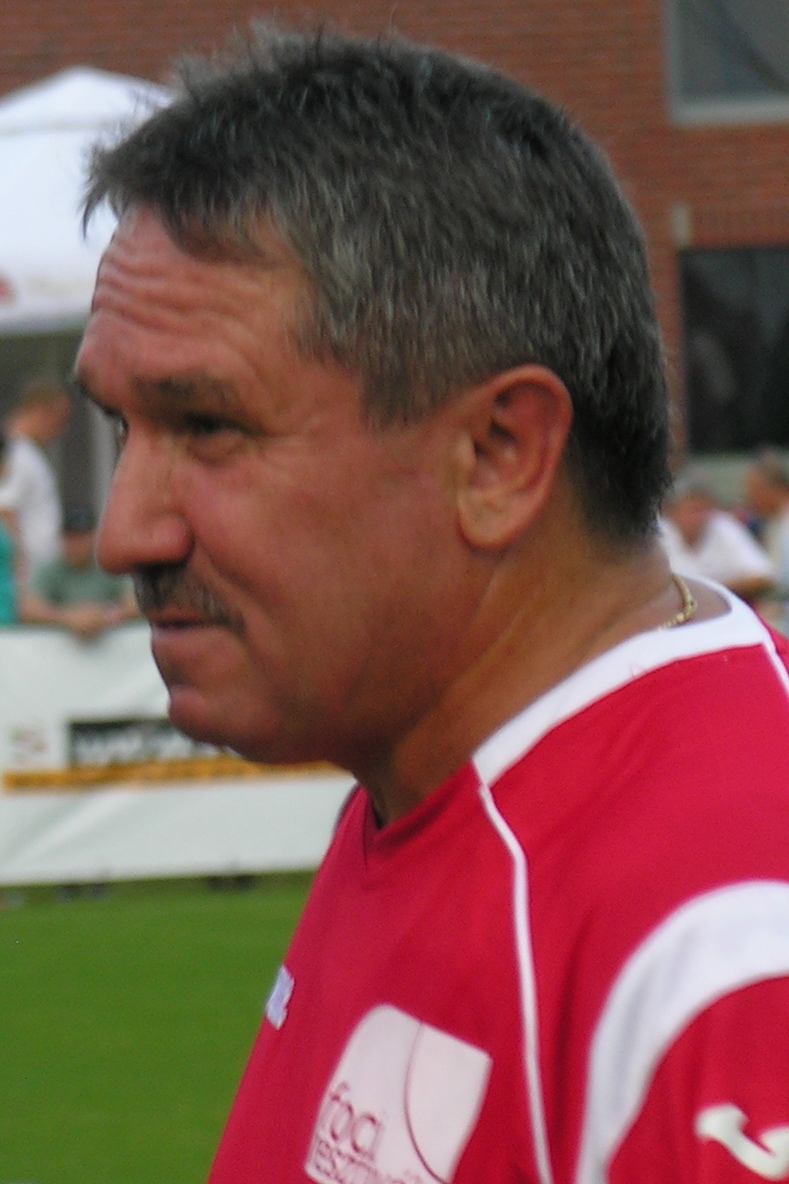

Personal information
- Date of birth: 29 March 1956 (age 70)
- Place of birth: Apácatorna, Hungary
- Height: 1.73 m (5 ft 8 in)
- Position: Midfielder

Senior career*
| Years | Team | Apps | (Gls) |
| 1975–1987 | Videoton | 315 | (24) |
| 1987–1988 | Győr | 22 | (0) |
| 1988–1989 | Veszprém | 25 | (0) |
| Total | | 362 | (24) |

International career
| 1976–1984 | Hungary | 24 | (0) |

Managerial career
- 1995–1996: Videoton
- 1996–1997: Sopron
- 1998: Videoton
- 1999–2000: Gázszer
- 2000–2001: Videoton
- * Club domestic league appearances and goals as of 10 June 1989

Ferenc Csongrádi (born 29 March 1956) is a Hungarian football manager and former player who played at both professional and international levels as a midfielder.

== Career ==
Born in Apácatorna, Csongrádi played club football for Videoton.

He also earned 24 caps for the Hungary national team between 1976 and 1984, representing them at the 1982 FIFA World Cup.
