= Ferenc Kovács (footballer) =

Hungarian footballer and coach

Personal information
- Date of birth: 7 January 1934
- Place of birth: Budapest, Hungary
- Date of death: 30 May 2018 (aged 84)
- Place of death: Székesfehérvár, Hungary
- Position: Defender

Senior career*
Years	Team	Apps	(Gls)
1954–1965	MTK		

International career
1955	Hungary	1 (0)	

Managerial career
- 1968–1969: MTK
- 1970–1972: Egri Dózsa
- 1972–1977: Videoton
- 1977–1978: Vasas
- 1978–1979: Hungary
- 1980–1983: Debreceni VSC
- 1983–1986: Videoton
- 1986–1987: Las Palmas
- 1987–1988: Videoton
- 1989–1990: Szeged SC
- 1990–1992: Újpest
Medal record
Men's football
Representing Hungary
Olympic Games
Bronze medal – third place	1960 Rome	Team competition
- * Club domestic league appearances and goals

Ferenc Kovács (7 January 1934 – 30 May 2018) was a Hungarian footballer, who played as a defender, and later became a coach. He played for MTK and was capped once for Hungary. He won a bronze medal at the 1960 Summer Olympics in football.
