= Győző Burcsa =

Hungarian footballer

Gyõzõ Burcsa
Personal information
- Full name: Gyõzõ Burcsa
- Date of birth: 13 March 1954 (age 72)
- Place of birth: Kaposvár, Hungary
- Height: 1.75 m (5 ft 9 in)
- Position: Midfielder

Senior career*
Years	Team	Apps	(Gls)
1973–1976	Kaposvári Rákóczi	30	(11)
1976–1981	Videoton		
1981–1984	Győri ETO FC	74	(32)
1984–1985	Videoton	177	(67)
1985–1987	Auxerre	48	(6)
1987–1988	Melun-Fontainebleau	27	(3)
1988–1989	Arras		
Total		356	(119)

International career
1979–1987	Hungary	15	(3)

Managerial career
- 1990–1992: Videoton
- 1993: Nyíregyháza
- 1995–1996: Sopron
- * Club domestic league appearances and goals

Gyõzõ Burcsa (born 13 March 1954) is a Hungarian former international footballer who played as a midfielder.

He was a participant in the 1986 FIFA World Cup where Hungary was eliminated in the first round. During that tournament, Gyõzõ played in the Hungary–Canada and the USSR–Hungary matches.

== Honours ==
Videoton

- UEFA Europa League runner-up: 1984–85
