= József Szabó (footballer, born 1956) =

Hungarian footballer

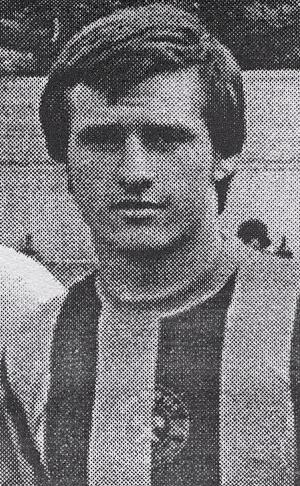
- Szabó in 1977

Personal information
- Full name: József Szabó
- Date of birth: 31 January 1956 (age 70)
- Place of birth: Dorog, Hungary
- Height: 1.82 m (5 ft 11 1/2 in)
- Position: Striker

Youth career
- 1967–1974: Dorogi Bányász

Senior career*
Years	Team	Apps	(Gls)
1974–1977	Dorogi Bányász	125	(56)
1977–1985	Videoton	224	(108)
1985–1987	Iraklis	17	(2)
1987	Videoton	12	(3)
1987–1988	Dorogi Bányász	34	(32)
1988	Apollon Kalamarias	8	(0)
1988–1991	ASK Bruck		
1992	Oggau		
1992–1995	USC Krumbach		

Managerial career
- 1997: Videoton
- * Club domestic league appearances and goals

József Szabó (born 31 January 1956) is a retired Hungarian footballer who played as a centre forward.
