= Videoton FC Fehérvár =

Hungarian association football club

- Full name: Videoton Football Club Fehérvár
- Nickname: Vidi
- Founded: 1941; 85 years ago
- Ground: Sóstói Stadion, Székesfehérvár
- Capacity: 14,201
- Head coach: Balázs Bekő
- League: NB II
- 2025–26: 8th of 16
- Website: fehervarfc.hu
Home colours	Away colours

Videoton Football Club Fehérvár (commonly known as Vidi or Fehérvár FC), is a Hungarian professional football club based in Székesfehérvár, which plays in the Nemzeti Bajnokság II from 2025–26, the second level of the Hungarian league system after relegation from Nemzeti Bajnokság I in 2024–25. Due to sponsorship reasons, the club changed its name from Videoton FC to MOL Vidi FC in 2018, the main sponsor of the club being that time the oil and gas multinational company MOL. In 2025, the club changed its name once again to Videoton FC Fehérvár.

Fehérvár has won the Nemzeti Bajnokság I three times, in 2011, 2015, and 2018. They have also won the Magyar Kupa twice: in 2006, after defeating Vasas on penalties in the final, and in 2019, after defeating Budapest Honvéd FC. They won the defunct Hungarian League Cup three times in 2008, 2009, and 2012 and the also defunct Hungarian Super Cup two times in 2011 and 2012. Fehérvár is best known in European football for reaching the 1985 UEFA Cup Final, being led by Ferenc Kovács. Most recently, the team has participated in the group stage of the UEFA Europa League in the 2012–13 and 2018–19 seasons.

The club colours are blue and red. Since 1967, Fehérvár has been playing its home matches the Sóstói Stadion.

== Background ==
The original name of the football club, Videoton SC, comes from the Hungarian company (owned by the state between 1955 and 1991).

On 1 July 2018, the club's name was changed from Videoton FC to MOL Vidi FC despite strong disagreement of the supporters of the club. A further change was made on 1 July 2019, becoming Mol Fehérvár FC. This change did not affect anything else, as the Vidi brand will also be used by the club. On 1 July 2023, MOL stopped financing the club. Therefore, the club omitted MOL from their name. Then playing on the name Fehérvár FC until 2025 and regaining the historical Videoton FC Fehérvár afterward in Summer 2025.

== History ==
Fehérvár was founded in 1941 as Székesfehérvári Vadásztölténygyár SK. After several name changes, adopting the term Videoton, the team played in the first division for the first time during the 1968 season but they were immediately relegated. Their first domestic success occurred in the 1975–76 season when they finished 2nd. Fehérvár's biggest domestic success happened in the 2010–11 season when they finished first. Later they repeated the success by winning the championship in 2015 and 2018.

At international level, Fehérvár's biggest success has been reaching the 1985 UEFA Cup Final where they lost to Real Madrid CF 1–3. That season, the team was able to knock out PSG in the second round and Manchester United in the quarterfinals. Despite being Hungarian champions three times since 2000, Fehérvár have never qualified for the group stage of the UEFA Champions League. They did, however, reach the group stage of the Europa League in 2012–13 and 2018–19. With qualification for the later stages being a possibility until the last match day each time, Fehérvár ultimately failed to reach the top two spots of their groups both occasions.

On 24 May 2025, Fehérvár secure relegation to Nemzeti Bajnoksag II after defeat from Debreceni VSC 0–3 in final matchday and ended 25 years in top tier.

== Colours, badge and nicknames ==
The colours of the club are blue and red, representing the colours of the coat of arms of Székesfehérvár. The club used different crests and badges since their foundation in 1941. The crests also indicate the changes of the name of the club, however, the colours were always the same i.e. blue and red. The most famous nickname of the club is Vidi.

The badge (which is being used since 2009 with minor changes following the renamings) is blue and red, and in the centre the castle refers to the symbol of the town: "vár" from "Székesfehérvár" means castle. The name and the year of the foundation can also be seen on the badge.

MOL Fehérvár FC logo

Videoton FC Fehérvár logo

=== Name changes ===
- 1941: Vadásztölténygyári SK
- 1942–44: Székesfehérvári MOVE Vadásztölténygyár Sport és Kultur Egyesület
- 1944–47: didn't participate in championships due to World War II
- 1947–48: Székesfehérvári Vadásztölténygyári SE
- 1948–50: Fehérvári Dolgozók SE
- 1950–56: Székesfehérvári Vadásztölténygyári Vasas SK
- 1957–62: Székesfehérvári Vasas SC
- 1962–68: Székesfehérvári VT Vasas
- 1968–90: Videoton Sport Club
- 1990–91: Videoton-Waltham SC
- 1991–93: Videoton-Waltham FC
- 1993–95: Parmalat FC
- 1995–96: Fehérvár-Parmalat FC
- 1996: Fehérvár Parmalat '96 FC
- 1996–04: Videoton FC Fehérvár
- 2004–09: FC Fehérvár
- 2009–2018: Videoton FC
- 2018–2019: MOL Vidi FC
- 2019–2023: MOL Fehérvár FC
- 2023–2025: Fehérvár FC
- 2025–present: Videoton FC Fehérvár

=== Manufacturers and shirt sponsors ===
The following table shows in detail Fehérvár FC kit manufacturers and shirt sponsors by year:

Period	Kit manufacturer	Shirt sponsor
1976–1989	Adidas	Videoton
1989–1992	Adidas	Waltham
1992–1993	Umbro	Waltham
1993–1995	Umbro	Parmalat
1995–1996	Hummel	Parmalat
1996–1997	Uhlsport	Parmalat
1997–1998	Uhlsport	—N/a
1998–2000	Uhlsport	Videoton
2000−2004	Diadora	Videoton
2004–2006	Diadora	—N/a
2006–2007	Puma	UPC
2007–2008	Hummel	—N/a
2008–2015	Nike	Máltai Szeretetszolgálat
2015–2016	Adidas	Máltai Szeretetszolgálat
2016–	Adidas	MOL

== Stadium ==
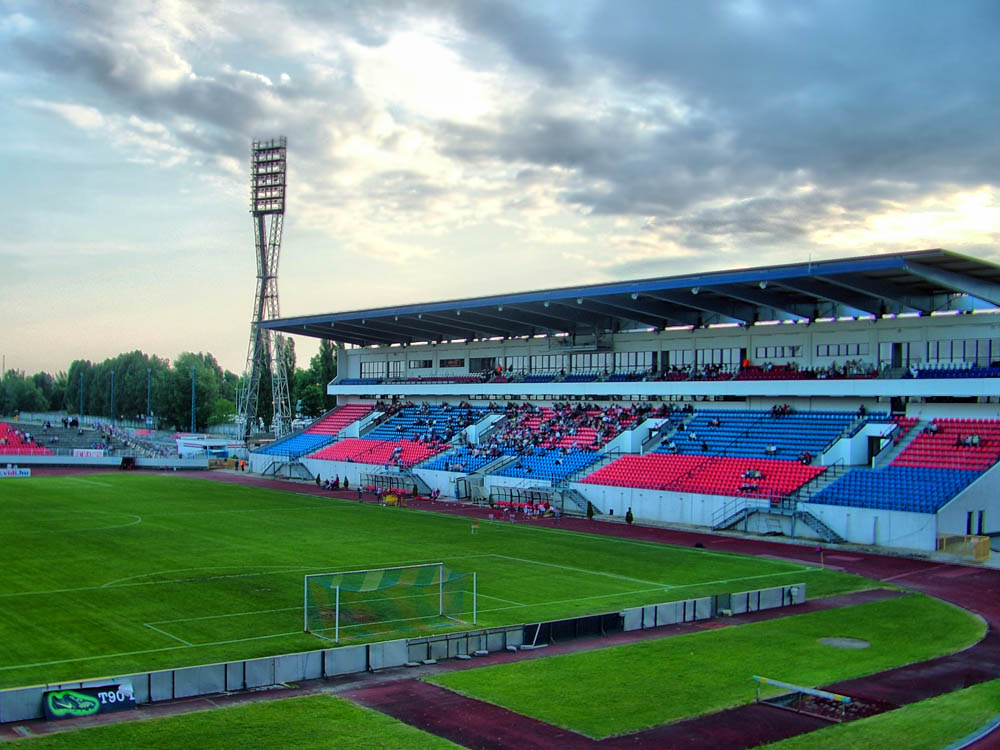
Sóstói Stadion

The multi-purpose stadium of the club is located in Székesfehérvár, Hungary. The name of the stadium is Sóstói Stadion which originates from neighbouring Sóstó (in English Salt Lake). Its capacity is 14,300 (all seated) and it was opened in 1967. The record attendance was in 1985 when Videoton FC played Spanish giants Real Madrid in the first leg of the final of the 1984–85 UEFA Cup.

The first ground of the club could be found in the Berényi Street. On 26 September 1946, the first match was played at the Berényi Street Ground. Videoton played its matches here from 1950 to 1959. From 1959, the team played on a grass turf until 1967. The club moved to the Sóstói Stadion three times. The first era spent at the stadium was between 1948–50 and 1959–62. In 1967, the club moved there permanently.

Due to the reconstruction of the Sóstói Stadion, Videoton played their home matches at the Pancho Aréna in the 2016–17 Nemzeti Bajnokság I and 2016–17 UEFA Europa League season. The Pancho Arena is located in Felcsút and its main tenant is Nemzeti Bajnokság I club Puskás Akadémia FC. The director of Videoton chose Pancho Aréna as their home due to the club's strong ties with Puskás Akadémia. However, the capacity of the Pancho Aréna is much smaller than Videoton's original stadium.

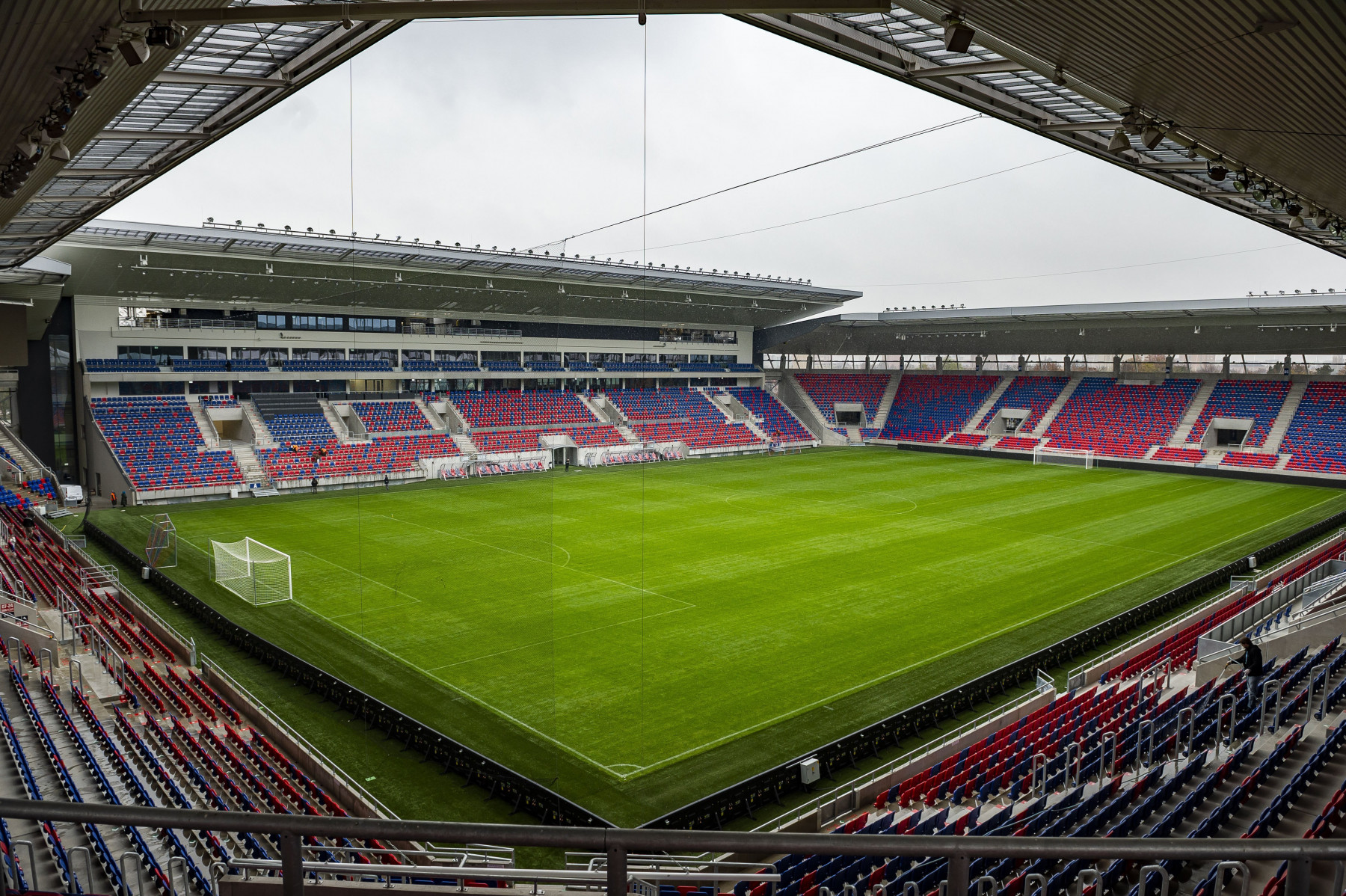
MOL Aréna Sóstó was opened in 2018

On 23 November 2016 the construction officially started.

On 7 February 2017, László Horváth, project manager of Sóstó Konzorcium, said that the first phase of the construction ended. The demolition of the interior of the remaining main stand ended. The concrete of the demolished parts of the main stand will be reused in the building of the new stands. The Sóstó Konzorcium will have 14 months to finish the construction of the stadium.

On 13 March 2017, László Horváth, project manager of Sóstó Konzorcium, said that thanks to the mild winter the construction of the new stadium is in good progress. The construction of the base of the stands were finished in March.

On 27 March 2017, it was confirmed that the construction of the stadium would be finished by 16 January 2018. Péter Gönczöl, managing director of Strabag-MML Kft., said that the construction is in the most spectacular phase when the biggest panels are positioned into their places. András Cser-Palkovics, mayor of Székesfehérvár, said that due to the severe weather conditions during winter the construction could be finished by the deadline. Róbert Varga, director of Strabag-Hungary, added that the new stadium will be able to host 14,201 spectators and the stadium will be lying on a base of 10,199 square metres and the highest point of the stadium will be 21.28 metres.

On 18 August 2017, it was announced that the main stand should also be demolished due to statical problems. Originally, the new stadium would have been built around the main stand. Due to the reconstruction of the main stand, the opening of the new stadium will be delayed to June 2018.

On 14 August 2018, an article was published on the Hungarian news website, Index.hu, stating that there will be further delays in the opening of the new stadium. One day later, it was announced that the 2018–19 UEFA Champions League play-off matches will be played at Ferencvárosi TC's home stadium, Groupama Aréna in Budapest.

The first match was played between Fehérvár FC and Újpest FC in the 2018–19 Nemzeti Bajnokság I season and it ended with a 1–0 victory for the home side. The first goal was scored by Roland Juhász. The new stadium was also renamed as MOL Aréna Sóstó for sponsorship reason. Since there was a MOL Aréna in Dunaszerdahely, Sóstó was added to the new name.

On 1 July 2023, the name of the stadium was changed from MOL Aréna Sóstó to Sóstói Stadion due to changes in sponsorship.

== Ownership ==
Being the favourite football club of the Hungarian Prime Minister Viktor Orbán, from 2010, some of the most wealthy Hungarians started to appear in the VIP of the team (e.g. Sándor Csányi, president of the Hungarian OTP Bank and the Hungarian Football Association) by the side of the Prime Minister. In December 2007, István Garancsi, a friend of Viktor Orbán's. purchased the club.

On 2 June 2023, it was announced that the club's main sponsor, MOL, would not finance the club anymore.

After the relegation to Nemzeti Bajnokság II, there was a change in the ownership of the club. On 26 May 2025, István Garancsi, former owner, said that he would sell the club for 1 HUF. On 30 May 2025, András Cser-Palkovics, mayor of Székesfehérvár, said that the city has to do everything to save the club from dissolution. On 6 June 2025, the Hungarian Football Federation announced that they delay the applications for the 2025-26 Nemzeti Bajnokság II season ten days. In this way, Fehérvár would have the chance to settle the issues concerning their ownership. On 10 June 2025, it was announced that the city of Székesfehérvár would like to purchase the club. On 13 June 2025, the contracts were signed and the new owner became the city of Székesfehérvár.

== Supporters and rivalries ==
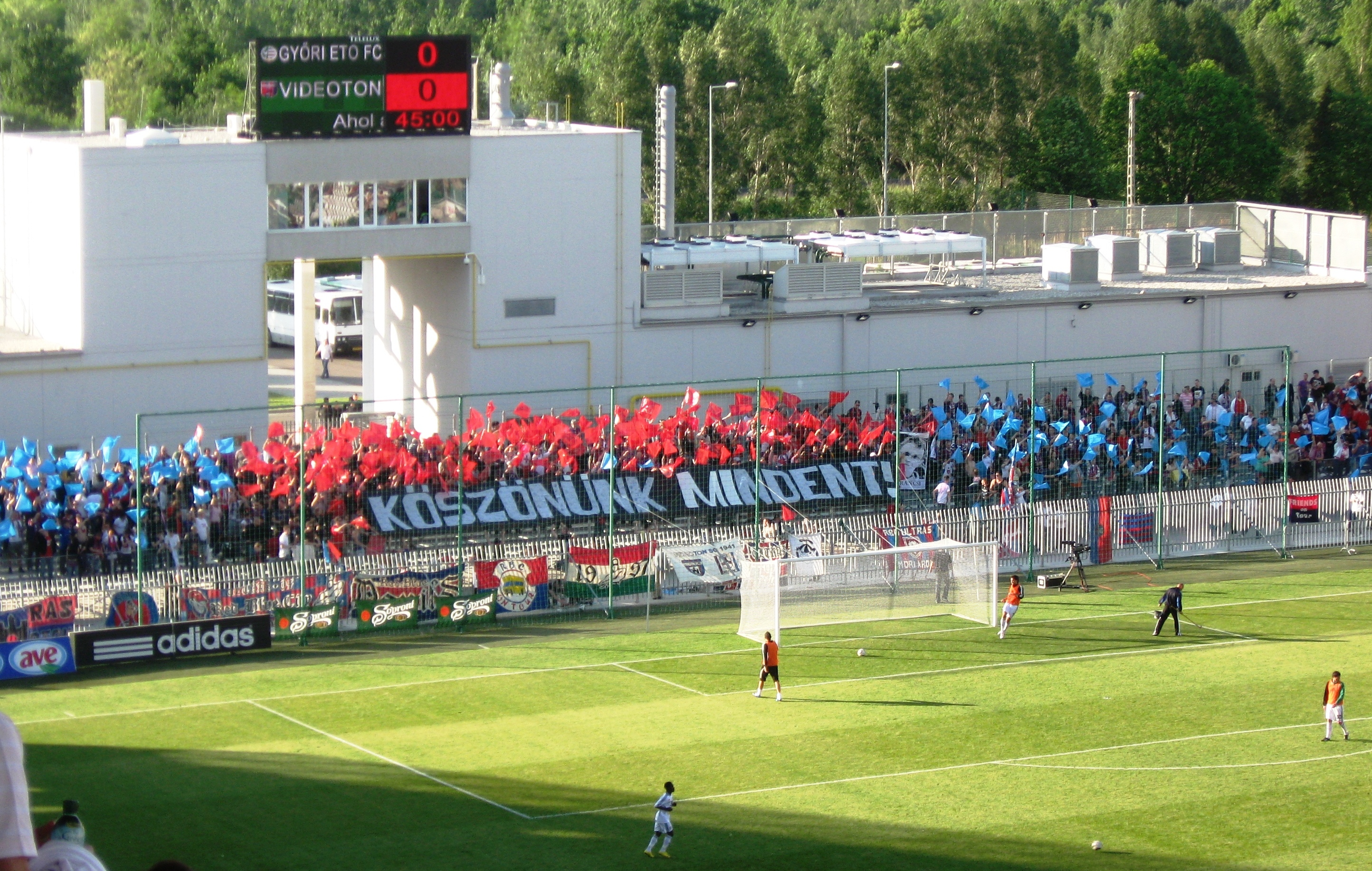
Videoton supporters at the ETO Park, in Győr, 2010.

The supporters of the club are based in Székesfehérvár, in Fejér County, Hungary. One of the group of supporters is the Red Blue Devils which is considered the main ultras of the team (there are smaller groups like Red-Blue City, Sóstói Hableányok, G-pont). Fehérvár FC is in rivalry with the most famous Hungarian clubs such as Ferencváros, Újpest, Győri ETO, Haladás, and Debrecen. The club has a local rival, Puskás Akadémia FC, based in Felcsút, Fejér County, but the rivalry is relatively tame. These two clubs had a stadium share in Felcsut while Fehérvár's stadium was under renovation, 2016–18. Fejer county's second most populated city is Dunaújváros, but Dunaferr FC, formerly based there, no longer exists. Between 1997 and 1999, Videoton's local rival was Gázszer FC which was based in Agárd, Fejér County.

Fehérvár FC has a selection of celebrity supporters such as the former Prime Minister of Hungary, Viktor Orbán.

== Honours ==
=== Domestic ===
- Nemzeti Bajnokság I
  - Winners (3): 2010–11, 2014–15, 2017–18
  - Runners-up (8): 1975–76, 2009–10, 2011–12, 2012–13, 2015–16, 2016–17, 2018–19, 2019–20
- Nemzeti Bajnokság II
  - Winners (3): 1957, 1969, 1999–2000
- Magyar Kupa
  - Winners (2): 2005–06, 2018–19
  - Runners-up (5): 1981–82, 2000–01, 2010–11, 2014–15, 2020–21
- Ligakupa
  - Winners (3): 2007–08, 2008–09, 2011–12
  - Runners-up (2): 2012–13, 2013–14
- Szuperkupa
  - Winners (2): 2011, 2012
  - Runners-up (3): 2006, 2010, 2015

=== International ===
- UEFA Cup
  - Runners-up (1): 1984–85
- IFC
  - Outright Group Winners (2): 1983, 1984

== Seasons ==
=== League positions ===
As of 12 July 2025

== Players ==
=== Current squad ===
As of 20 February 2026 Note: Flags indicate national team as defined under FIFA eligibility rules; some limited exceptions apply. Players may hold more than one non-FIFA nationality.

No.	Pos.	Nation	Player
1	GK	HUN	Gergely Nagy
2	MF	HUN	Máté Kecskés
3	DF	HUN	Olivér Hesz
4	DF	HUN	Csaba Spandler (captain)
8	MF	HUN	Ádám Somogyi (on loan from Kispest Honvéd)
9	FW	HUN	Patrik Kovács
10	MF	HUN	Zsolt Haraszti (on loan from Paks)
14	MF	SVK	Bence Kovács
16	DF	HUN	Mario Simut
18	FW	HUN	Dániel Németh (on loan from Zalaegerszeg)
19	MF	HUN	Zsombor Menyhárt
21	MF	HUN	Donát Zsótér
22	DF	HUN	Benedek Murka
23	MF	HUN	Dávid Zimonyi

No.	Pos.	Nation	Player
25	MF	HUN	Gergő Kocsis
26	MF	HUN	Bálint Geiger (on loan from Újpest)
27	MF	HUN	Bence Bedi
28	FW	HUN	Dániel Bartusz
29	DF	HUN	Zsolt Kojnok
44	GK	HUN	Botond Kemenes
53	MF	HUN	Tamás Horváth
73	FW	HUN	Dániel Bertók
76	FW	HUN	Dániel Nagy
78	DF	HUN	Kende Köllő (on loan from Paks II)
80	MF	HUN	Márk Dékei (on loan from Újpest)
87	DF	HUN	Milán Virágh
90	DF	HUN	Krisztián Kovács
97	FW	HUN	Roland Varga

=== Out on loan ===
Note: Flags indicate national team as defined under FIFA eligibility rules; some limited exceptions apply. Players may hold more than one non-FIFA nationality.

No.	Pos.	Nation	Player
33	DF	HUN	Kristóf Lakatos (at Puskás Akadémia II until 30 June 2026)
71	FW	HUN	Tamás Tóth (at Ajka until 30 June 2026)

No.	Pos.	Nation	Player
99	DF	HUN	Szilárd Rostás (at Veszprém until 30 June 2026)
—	DF	HUN	Bence Babos (at Diósgyőr until 30 June 2026)

=== Retired numbers ===
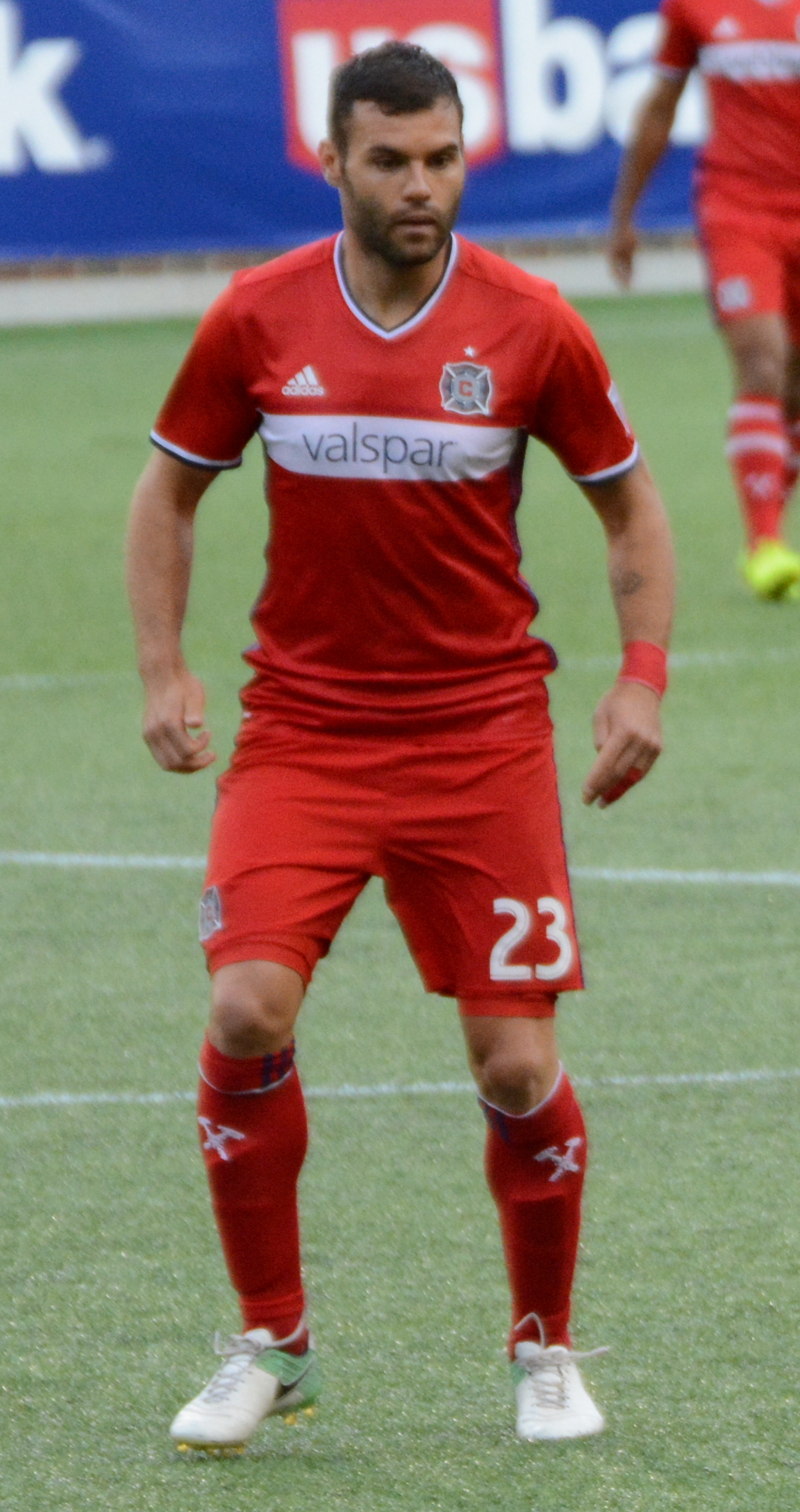
Nemanja Nikolić, is the greatest goalscorer of the club

Note: Flags indicate national team as defined under FIFA eligibility rules; some limited exceptions apply. Players may hold more than one non-FIFA nationality.

No.	Pos.	Nation	Player
17	FW	HUN	Nemanja Nikolić (the club's greatest goalscorer with 164 goals)

== Club officials ==
=== Staff ===
As of 11 May 2024

Position	Name
Head coach	(Sweden) (Poland) Bartosz Grzelak
Assistant coach	(Hungary) Szabolcs Huszti
Goalkeeper coach	(Hungary) András Elbert
Technical director	(Hungary) Norbert Rédei
Head video analyst	(Hungary) Gábor Késedi
Video analyst	(Hungary) Bence Pap
Club doctor	(Hungary) Tibor Kovács Dávid
Club doctor	(Hungary) Tibor Kovács
Physiotherapist 1	(Hungary) Gábor Barta
Physiotherapist 2	(Hungary) Roland Kátai
Physiotherapist 3	(Hungary) Gergely Gál
Sport masseur 1	(Hungary) Péter Gáspár
Sport masseur 2	(Hungary) Ildikó Fejes
Sport masseur 3	(Hungary) Tibor Debreceni
Kitman 1	(Hungary) Róbert Lakatos
Kitman 2	(Hungary) Gergő Stéger

=== Former club directors and sports directors ===
- (Hungary) György Mezey (07/01/2008-30/06/2011)
- (Hungary) Győző Burcsa (2014-17/08/2015)
- (Hungary) Zoltán Kovács (18 August 2015 – 17 July 2021)
- (Hungary) Nemanja Nikolić (11 November 2025-present)

== Notable foreign players ==
Angola

- (Angola) Evandro Brandao

Bosnia and Herzegovina

- (Bosnia and Herzegovina) Mario Bozić
- (Bosnia and Herzegovina) Jusuf Dajić
- (Bosnia and Herzegovina) Elvir Hadžić
- (Bosnia and Herzegovina) Anel Hadžić
- (Bosnia and Herzegovina) Armin Hodžić
- (Bosnia and Herzegovina) Kenan Kodro
- (Bosnia and Herzegovina) Asmir Suljić

Brazil

- (Brazil) André Alves
- (Brazil) Alison Silva
- (Brazil) Kaká
- (Brazil) Renato Neto
- (Brazil) César Romero
- (Brazil) Jeff Silva
- (Brazil) Edson
- (Brazil) Nildo Petrolina

Bulgaria

- (Bulgaria) Georgi Milanov

Cape Verde

- (Cape Verde) Stopira
- (Cape Verde) Zé Luís

Croatia

- (Croatia) Milan Pavličić
- (Croatia) Marko Pajač
- (Croatia) Dinko Trebotić

El Salvador

- (El Salvador) Arturo Álvarez

France

- (France) Loïc Nego
- (France) Lyes Houri

Georgia

- (Georgia (country)) Budu Zivzivadze

Germany

- (Germany) Marcel Heister

Guinea-Bissau

- (Guinea-Bissau) Mamadu Candé

Guinea

- (Guinea) Alhassane Soumah

Morocco

- (Morocco) Sofian Chakla

North Macedonia

- (North Macedonia) Mirko Ivanovski
- (North Macedonia) Visar Musliu
- (North Macedonia) Boban Nikolov
- (North Macedonia) Nikola Serafimov

Martinique

- (Martinique) Rémi Maréval

Montenegro

- (Montenegro) Goran Vujovic
- (Montenegro) Milan Purovic
- (Montenegro) Mladen Bozovic
- (Montenegro) Ilija Radović

Netherlands

- (Netherlands) Kees Luijckx

Nigeria

- (Nigeria) Ezekiel Henty
- (Nigeria) Funsho Bamgboye

Portugal

- (Portugal) Marco Caneira
- (Portugal) Filipe Oliveira
- (Portugal) Vítor Gomes
- (Portugal) Jucie Lupeta

Romania

- (Romania) Gabriel Vochin
- (Romania) Daniel Tudor
- (Romania) Marian Savu
- (Romania) Adrian Rus

Russia

- (Russia) Aleksandr Alumona

Serbia

- (Serbia) Aleksandar Stanojević
- (Serbia) Marko Andić
- (Serbia) Dušan Vasiljević
- (Serbia) Nikola Mitrović
- (Serbia) Milan Perić
- (Serbia) Uroš Nikolić
- (Serbia) Danko Lazović
- (Serbia) Marko Šćepović
- (Serbia) Stefan Šćepović
- (Serbia) Filip Pajović
- (Serbia) Branislav Danilović

Slovakia

- (Slovakia) Tomáš Tujvel
- (Slovakia) Pavol Durica
- (Slovakia) Tomáš Medveď

Slovenia

- (Slovenia) Nejc Gradišar

Spain

- (Spain) Álvaro Brachi
- (Spain) Walter Fernández
- (Spain) Juan Calatayud
- (Spain) Héctor Sánchez

Sweden

- (Sweden) Bojan Djordjic

Ukraine

- (Ukraine) Mykhaylo Denysov
- (Ukraine) Bohdan Lyednyev
- (Ukraine) Yevhen Makarenko
- (Ukraine) Ivan Petryak
- (Ukraine) Artem Shabanov

Uganda

- (Uganda) Martin Kayongo-Mutumba

== See also ==
- Fehérvár FC in European football
- List of Fehérvár FC managers
- List of Fehérvár FC seasons
