= List of FK Željezničar seasons =

Fudbalski klub Željezničar Sarajevo is a Bosnian professional football club based in Sarajevo, Bosnia and Herzegovina. The following article lists all the club seasons that the club has taken part in.

The club was formed in 1921, and played its first competitive match on 17 September 1921, when it lost 5–1 against SAŠK Napredak. As of 2026, Željezničar is one of only four clubs never to have been relegated from the top level of Bosnian football, the others being Sarajevo, Zrinjski Mostar and Široki Brijeg.

== SFR Yugoslavia (1946–1992) ==
Yugoslav League seasons 1946–1992 references:

Season	League									Cup	Europe	Top goalscorer	
Season	Division	P	W	D	L	F	A	Pts	Pos	Cup	Europe	Name	Goals
1945–46	Bosnia and Herzegovina Republic League	4	2	1	1	4	3	5	1st ↑	None	None	Milan Rajlić	4
1946–47	Yugoslav First League	26	7	4	15	31	54	18	12th ↓	R2	None	Velislav Lazarević; Anto Martinović	5
1947–48	Yugoslav Second League	20	6	4	10	28	34	16	9th ↓	R2	None	Mensur Bajrami; Dušan Nikolić; Ivan Arih	4
1948–49	Bosnia and Herzegovina Republic League	22	15	6	1	68	17	36	1st ↑	R1	None	Nerćez Novo	22^{†}
1950	Yugoslav Second League	20	6	5	9	21	40	17	10th	R1	None	Aleksandar Petrović	8
1951	Yugoslav Second League	30	11	7	12	43	47	29	11th	R1	None	Mensur Bajrami	8
1952	League of Sarajevo	6	4	1	1	26	7	9	1st ↑	None	None	Anto Martinović	6
1952–53	Bosnia and Herzegovina Republic League	6	2	3	1	17	8	7	2nd ↑	None	None	Ilijas Pašić	25^{†}
1953–54	Yugoslav Second League	18	11	2	5	44	26	24	2nd ↑	None	None	Sulejman Kulović; Ilijas Pašić	13
1954–55	Yugoslav First League	26	8	13	15	34	52	19	11th	None	None	Ilijas Pašić	13
1955–56	Yugoslav First League	26	7	7	12	33	54	21	13th ↓	None	None	Sulejman Kulović	8
1956–57	Yugoslav Second League (I Zone)	22	17	2	3	62	13	36	1st ↑	None	None	Ilijas Pašić	17
1957–58	Yugoslav First League	26	9	7	10	44	47	25	8th	R16	None	Ilijas Pašić	10
1958–59	Yugoslav First League	22	7	3	12	26	35	17	12th ↓	R2	None	Mišo Smajlović	7
1959–60	Yugoslav Second League (West)	22	11	3	8	33	29	25	4th	QF	None	Mišo Smajlović	10
1960–61	Yugoslav Second League (West)	22	14	4	4	44	21	32	2nd	R1	None	Mišo Smajlović	10
1961–62	Yugoslav Second League (West)	22	14	3	5	53	21	31	1st ↑	R1	None	Mišo Smajlović	14^{†}
1962–63	Yugoslav First League	26	11	7	8	49	31	29	3rd	R1	None	Mišo Smajlović	18^{†}
1963–64	Yugoslav First League	26	8	10	8	37	43	26	6th	None	Mitropa Cup SF	Mišo Smajlović	14
1964–65	Yugoslav First League	28	13	7	8	39	30	33	5th	None	Mitropa Cup QF	Mišo Smajlović	13
^{1}1965–66	Yugoslav First League	30	12	8	10	35	36	26	12th	R1	Intertoto Cup GS	Josip Bukal	12
1966–67	Yugoslav First League	30	14	4	12	43	42	32	6th	QF	None	Josip Bukal	17
1967–68	Yugoslav First League	30	12	9	9	44	34	33	5th	None	Mitropa Cup QF	Edin Sprečo	13
1968–69	Yugoslav First League	34	15	8	11	51	38	38	5th	QF	Mitropa Cup SF	Fikret Mujkić	14
1969–70	Yugoslav First League	34	17	9	8	52	33	43	4th	R16	None	Josip Bukal	18
1970–71	Yugoslav First League	34	18	9	7	59	34	45	2nd	None	Inter-Cities Fairs Cup R1	Božo Janković	20^{†}
1971–72	Yugoslav First League	34	21	9	4	55	20	51	**1st**	None	UEFA Cup QF	Josip Bukal	14
1972–73	Yugoslav First League	34	18	6	10	59	41	42	5th	None	European Cup R1	Josip Bukal	15
1973–74	Yugoslav First League	34	10	12	12	39	39	32	8th	SF	None	Tarik Hodžić; Edin Sprečo	7
1974–75	Yugoslav First League	34	11	10	13	45	46	32	9th	SF	None	Božo Janković	12
1975–76	Yugoslav First League	34	11	9	14	40	47	31	12th	QF	None	Džemaludin Šerbo	8
1976–77	Yugoslav First League	34	8	10	16	33	53	26	18th ↓	R1	None	Fikret Mujkić	9
1977–78	Yugoslav Second League (West)	34	19	8	7	79	37	46	1st ↑	R1	None	Slobodan Kojović	25^{†}
1978–79	Yugoslav First League	34	14	4	16	45	52	32	9th	R2	None	Rade Paprica; Božo Janković	7
1979–80	Yugoslav First League	34	9	15	10	41	47	33	9th	R1	None	Ivan Lušić; Rade Paprica	9
1980–81	Yugoslav First League	34	11	10	13	42	51	32	14th	RU	None	Rade Paprica	8
1981–82	Yugoslav First League	34	16	6	12	52	37	38	5th	R1	None	Edin Bahtić	17
1982–83	Yugoslav First League	34	11	11	12	41	40	33	10th	R1	None	Edin Bahtić; Rade Paprica	8
1983–84	Yugoslav First League	34	15	12	7	52	35	42	3rd	R1	None	Nikola Nikić	14
1984–85	Yugoslav First League	34	11	12	11	53	46	34	7th	R1	UEFA Cup SF	Zoran Samardžija	10
1985–86	Yugoslav First League	34	15	5	14	58	63	35	7th	R1	None	Radmilo Mihajlović; Haris Škoro	14
1986–87	Yugoslav First League	34	14	6	14	55	46	34	9th	QF	None	Radmilo Mihajlović	23^{†}
1987–88	Yugoslav First League	34	8	14	12	38	44	30	12th	R2	None	Radmilo Mihajlović	12
1988–89	Yugoslav First League	34	12	5(1)	18	34	49	25	16th	R2	None	Edin Ćurić	9
1989–90	Yugoslav First League	34	14	6(4)	14	37	40	32	7th	R1	None	Nikola Nikić	6
1990–91	Yugoslav First League	36	11	13(7)	12	35	41	29	16th	R2	None	Zoran Slišković	9
^{2}1991–92	Yugoslav First League	17	6	3(3)	8	18	24	15	18th	SF	None	Mario Stanić	15

Top goalscorer; Name and Goals in bold indicate overall top league scorer for the season.

1 Željezničar were docked 6 points due to Planinić Affair
2 During season 1991–92 all of Željezničar's matches in the second half of the season were declared void due to Bosnian War resulting in Željezničar abandoning the competition as a result of Republic of Bosnia and Herzegovina declaring independence from Yugoslavia. The return leg of club's 1991–92 Yugoslav Cup semi-final tie was scheduled to be played on May 6, 1992; but due to Željezničar club leaving the competition earlier, Partizan were awarded the 3-0 win.

Željezničar competed next in 1994–95 season of First League of Bosnia and Herzegovina (see table below).

=== Key ===
1st / W	2nd / RU	3rd	SF	↑	↓	†
Champions	Runners-up	Third finish	Semi-finals	Promoted	Relegated	Top goalscorer

- P = Played
- W = Games won
- D = Games drawn
- L = Games lost
- F = Goals for
- A = Goals against
- Pts = Points
- Pos = Final position
- QR = Qualifying Round
- 1R = Round 1
- 2R = Round 2
- R16 = Round of 16
- QF = Quarter-finals
- SF = Semi-finals
- RU = Runners-up
- W = Winners
- None = No participation

== Bosnia and Herzegovina (1994–present) ==
Season	League									Cup	Europe	Top goalscorer	
Season	Division	P	W	D	L	F	A	Pts	Pos	Cup	Europe	Name	Goals
1994–95	First League	9	5	1	3	17	13	16	4th	R16	None	Marijo Dodik	6
1995–96	First League	30	12	4	14	35	62	40	9th	R1	None	Dželaludin Muharemović	10
1996–97	First League	30	13	5	12	46	41	44	7th	RU	None	Dželaludin Muharemović	14
1997–98	First League; Play-off	33	17	7	9	55	43	58	W	QF	None	Nermin Vazda	19^{†}
1998–99	First League	30	12	8	10	43	30	44	7th	SF	UEFA Cup QR	Nermin Vazda	18^{†}
1999–2000	First League	36	18	6	12	62	40	60	2nd	W	None	Nermin Vazda	10
Current format of Premier League of Bosnia and Herzegovina
2000–01	Premier League	42	28	7	7	113	38	91	1st	W	UEFA Cup QR	Dželaludin Muharemović	31^{†}
2001–02	Premier League	30	19	5	6	60	26	62	1st	RU	Champions League Q1	Ivica Huljev	15^{†}
2002–03	Premier League	38	24	10	4	66	24	82	2nd	W	Champions League Q3 UEFA Cup R1	Jure Guvo	8
2003–04	Premier League	30	18	5	7	67	35	59	2nd	R1	UEFA Cup R1	Admir Raščić	12
2004–05	Premier League	30	15	6	9	31	22	51	2nd	QF	UEFA Cup Q2	Dželaludin Muharemović; Emir Hadžić	5
2005–06	Premier League	30	11	7	12	38	33	40	6th	SF	Ineligible	Admir Vladavić	7
2006–07	Premier League	30	13	5	12	51	40	44	6th	QF	None	Boubacar Dialiba	10
2007–08	Premier League	30	14	3	13	47	35	45	7th	SF	None	Sanel Jahić	12
2008–09	Premier League	30	13	3	14	30	35	42	9th	R1	None	Samir Bekrić	7
2009–10	Premier League	30	18	7	5	52	22	61	1st	RU	None	Samir Bekrić	15
2010–11	Premier League	30	17	4	9	50	25	55	3rd	W	Champions League 2Q	Zajko Zeba	11
2011–12	Premier League	30	22	5	3	68	17	71	1st	W	Europa League 3Q	Eldin Adilović	19^{†}
2012–13	Premier League	30	20	6	4	48	20	66	1st	RU	Champions League 2Q	Eldin Adilović	18
2013–14	Premier League	30	16	9	5	51	29	57	4th	QF	Champions League 2Q	Armin Hodžić	14
2014–15	Premier League	30	18	9	3	52	22	63	2nd	R2	Europa League 2Q	Riad Bajić	15^{†}
2015–16	Premier League	30	16	7	7	36	20	55	5th	SF	Europa League 3Q	Ivan Lendrić	7
2016–17	Premier League	32	18	9	5	41	22	63	2nd	SF	None	Ivan Lendrić	19^{†}
2017–18	Premier League	32	19	6	7	49	30	63	2nd	W	Europa League 2Q	Goran Zakarić	12
2018–19	Premier League	33	14	8	11	43	32	50	4th	R1	Europa League 2Q	Sulejman Krpić	16^{†}
2019–20 (Note: 2019–20 Premier League of Bosnia and Herzegovina suspended in March 2020 due to the COVID-19 pandemic in Bosnia and Herzegovina; season curtailed and final standings (including Sarajevo as champions) declared by a points-per-game ratio on 1 June 2020.)	Premier League	22	12	6	4	43	21	42	2nd	SF	Ineligible	Sulejman Krpić	12
2020–21	Premier League	33	12	8	13	50	43	44	7th	QF	Europa League 1Q	Semir Štilić; Luka Juričić	8
2021–22	Premier League	33	9	16	8	28	29	43	6th	R2	None	Sedad Subašić	4
2022–23	Premier League	33	15	8	10	42	35	53	3rd	SF	None	Joseph Amoah; Clarismario Santos	8
2023–24	Premier League	33	13	4	16	35	36	43	6th	R1	Conference League 2Q	Sulejman Krpić	8
2024–25	Premier League	33	20	5	8	55	38	65	4th	SF	None	Sulejman Krpić; Aleksandar Boljević	11
2025–26	Premier League	36	10	12	14	34	37	42	6th	QF	Conference League 1Q	Hamza Jaganjac; Vini Peixoto	4

In the seasons 2000–01 and 2011–12 the club won a double; league title and national cup.
Top goalscorer; Indicates overall top league scorer for the season.

== See also ==
- Yugoslav First League
- Premier League of Bosnia and Herzegovina
- First League of Bosnia and Herzegovina
- Bosnia and Herzegovina Football Cup
- Supercup of Bosnia and Herzegovina
