= Stadion Grbavica =

Football stadium in Sarajevo, Bosnia and Herzegovina

Grbavica Stadium
- "Dolina ćupova"
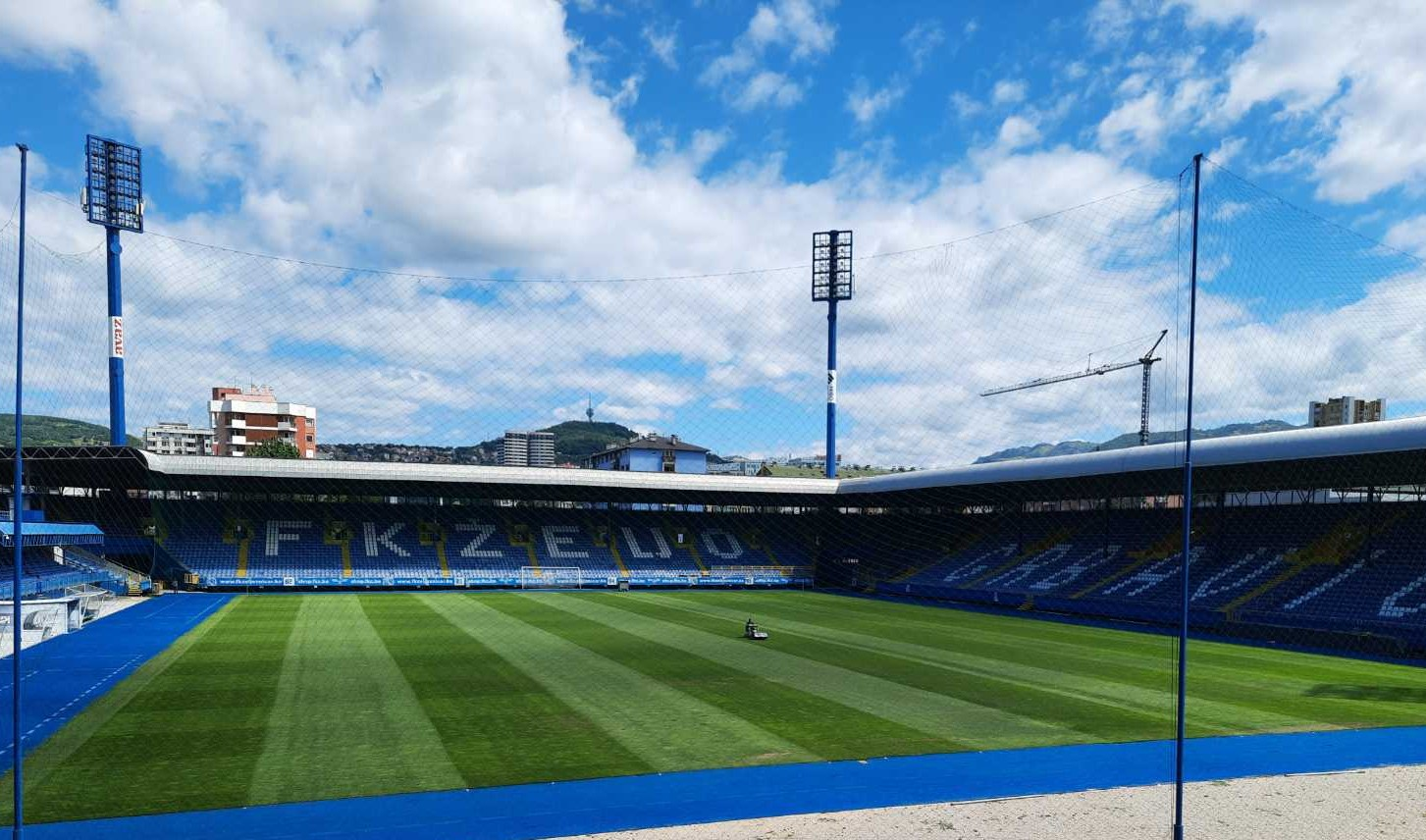
- UEFA
- Interactive map of Grbavica Stadium
- Location: Bulevar Ivice Osima 27, Grbavica, Sarajevo, Bosnia and Herzegovina
- Coordinates: 43°50′48″N 18°23′14″E
- Owner: FK Željezničar
- Operator: FK Željezničar
- Capacity: 13,057
- Surface: Hybrid grass
- Scoreboard: LED
- Field size: 105 x 68 m (114.8 x 74.3 yd)

Construction
- Built: 1949–53
- Opened: 13 September 1953
- Renovated: 1968–1976, 2016–2020
- Expanded: 2016–2017, 2025–present
- Cost: > €2 million

Tenants
- FK Željezničar (1953–1968, 1976–present); Bosnia and Herzegovina national football team (selected matches)

Grbavica Stadium (Bosnian: Stadion Grbavica) is an association football stadium located in Grbavica, Sarajevo, Bosnia and Herzegovina. It is the home stadium of FK Željezničar, and is also occasionally used by the Bosnia and Herzegovina national football team. The stadium has a capacity to hold 13,057 seated spectators. Grbavica Stadium is also known as Dolina ćupova (en. Valley of Jars).

== Construction ==
The construction of a sporting facility—that would eventually become football-only ground—in the Sarajevo neighbourhood of Grbavica started during the late 1940s. Although the city of Sarajevo had already had several football pitches with bleachers and stands (including the freshly built Koševo Stadium), it was decided by the Yugoslav communist authorities that resources are to be allocated towards construction of a new multi-sport facility for usage by various clubs under the umbrella of the SD Željezničar sports society. Many of the club's supporters, friends, and members, including a number of Yugoslav People's Army (JNA) personnel helped in the construction of the football ground. Unlike the construction of Koševo—a large-scale project with generous state support through funds and manpower—the construction of Grbavica had far fewer workers devoted to it and as a result took much longer to complete. A new pitch with a running track and drainage system was built along with rudimentary concrete stands. While the ground's southern and eastern end featured concrete-built stands, the western end had wooden stands that were taken from the recently torn Marijin Dvor ground.

Grbavica began as a multi-use facility: in addition to football matches, competitions in cycling and athletics were organized. Eventually, its use became football only.

The ground was officially opened on September 13, 1953 with the Yugoslav Second League western division match between Željezničar and RSD Šibenik. Željezničar won 4–1.

=== 1970s: eight-year closure for additions and renovations ===
In late June 1968, major improvements, additions, and renovations to the ground began, forcing its extended closure that ended up lasting almost eight years.

Ironically, during this time, its main tenant FK Željezničar achieved its greatest success—winning the 1971–72 Yugoslav First League title—playing its home matches away from its home ground, at cross-town rival FK Sarajevo's Koševo Stadium. Throughout this period, the only competitive footballing contests played at Grbavica were a handful of Željezničar's European home matches, such as the 1968–69 Mitropa Cup semifinal versus Sklo Union Teplice in May 1969 as well as 1971–72 UEFA Cup clashes against Club Brugge, Bologna FC, and St Johnstone FC during fall 1971.

On 25 April 1976, Grbavica was re-opened. With 50,000 cubic meters of materials used, the additions to the venue included installation of floodlights. Furthermore, two training pitches as well as new dressing rooms, showers, and other amenities were added. The Đurasović family were the first donors.

=== 1986: Northern stand added ===
In 1986, a proper northern stand was built. There were plans for the whole stadium to be remodeled and encircled to look like the newly built north stand, but they got shelved for the time being. As a result of the renovations, in October 1987, Yugoslavia national football team (coached at the time by Željo legend Ivica Osim) played its first ever match at the stadium. In a Euro 88 qualification clash versus Northern Ireland, Yugoslavia won 3–0.

=== Bosnian War ===
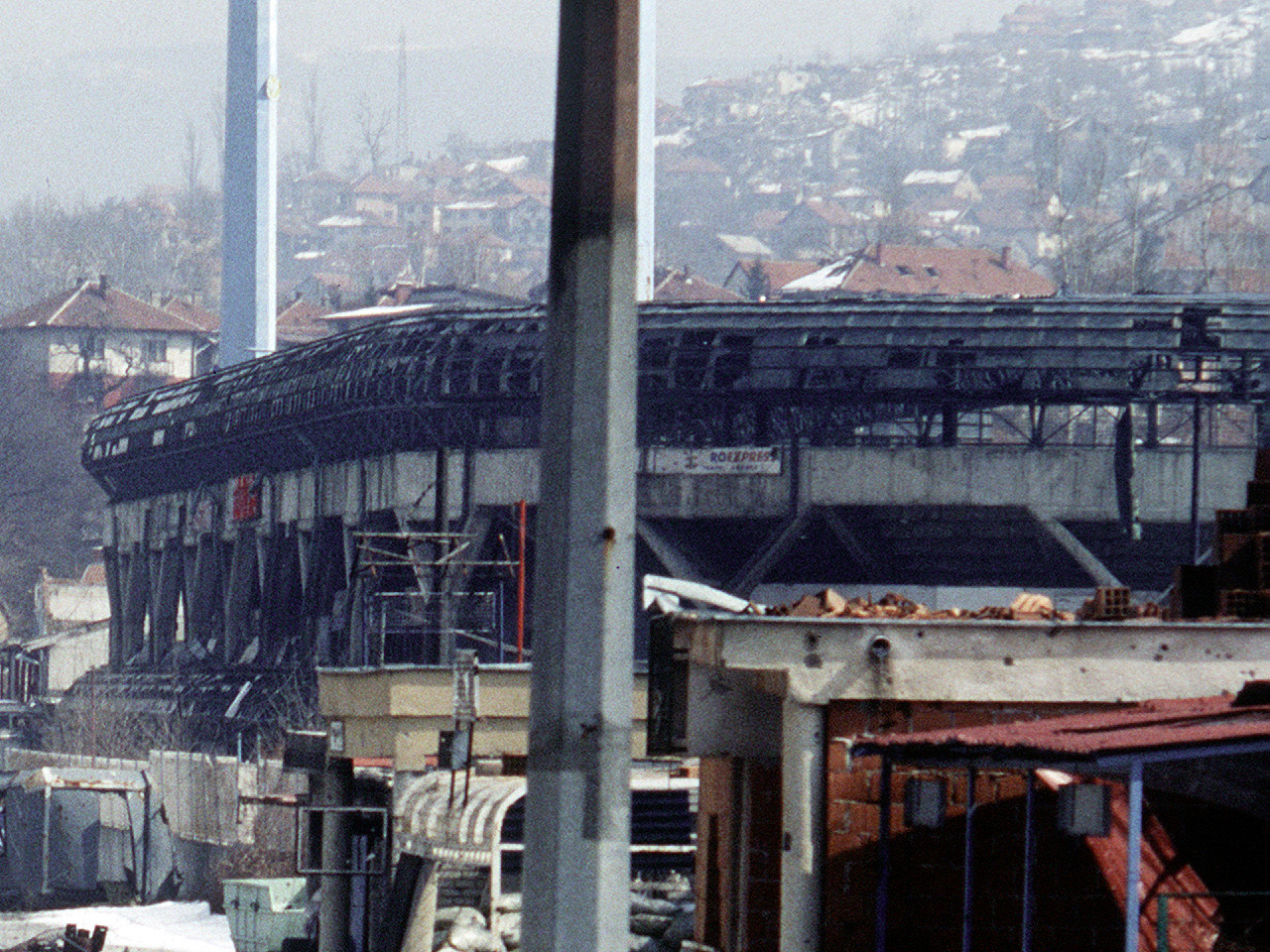
Grbavica Stadium during the Siege of Sarajevo

The stadium suffered heavy structural damage during the Bosnian War that broke out in 1992. The stadium was located between the first front lines and endured heavy fighting. Bosnian Serbs' forces burned the West stand wooden terraces. It was not until 1996 that a football match would be played here again. Symbolically, the first match after the war was the local derby. The capacity of North stands holds 5,377 seats.

=== 2000s ===
It was partly remodelled in following years. In 2004, 8898 seats were installed on the north and south stand and some small work was done to the terraces. The last major job done on the stadium was in 2008–09 when the floodlights were repaired. On 22 April 2009, after about 18 years, a game under floodlights was again played at Grbavica.

On Monday, 13 February 2012, a section of the roof above the west stand collapsed after 10 days of heavy snowfall. The main reason for the collapsing of the roof was the bad maintenance of the whole terrace and roof where the snow was not removed since the first snowfall, but also the war damage on the buildings.

=== 2016–2020: Extensive renovations and expansion ===
In 2016, the western stand held 690 seats, while the southern stand's capacity was 3,068 seats. A LED display was also installed on the south stand.

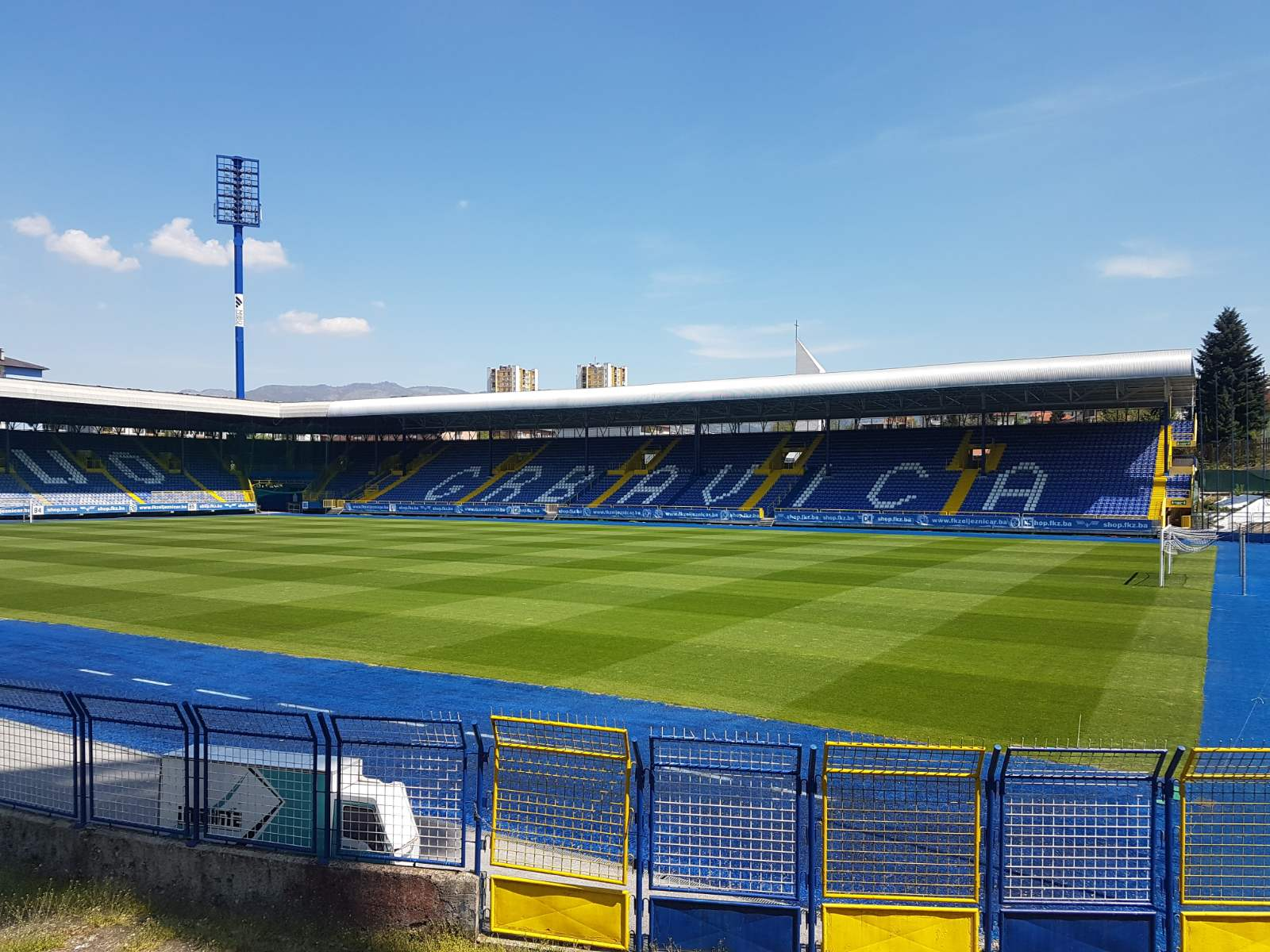
The eastern stand was built in 2017, while the roof above was completed in 2020

The east stand was rebuilt (an all seated stand replacing the entire East standing section) with works finishing in early April 2017. The capacity of the east stand is 4,650 seats. The East stand was funded entirely by club supporters and local businesses. United States midfielder Mix Diskerud donated funds to the project by buying 50 seats for the North stand as well as two ten year passes for East stand. Former club managers and players like Amar Osim, Edin Džeko, Ibrahim Šehić and Semir Štilić among others, also donated. Regional clubs also supported the project, with donations coming from Dinamo Zagreb.

On 1 April 2017, Željezničar played host to Sloboda Tuzla during the Championship round of the 2016–17 Premier League season and on the day the newly built Eastern Stand opened to public.

In May 2018, a new pitch with a drainage system was completed. The new pitch was replaced in July 2018.

In December 2019, the construction of the new roof on the eastern stand of the stadium begun. In March 2020, the construction was finished, with Željezničar playing its first game with the new roof against Tuzla City on 8 March 2020.

=== 2025–present: Expansion of the southern stand ===
In July 2025, the expansion of the southern stand started.

== Location ==
The stadium is situated in the Grbavica neighborhood, at the foot of Šanac Hill, which was once traversed by railway tracks of the Bosnian Eastern Railway. When trains passed near the stadium, they would blow their horns as a salute to the crowd. Today, the old railway is no longer in operation. However, trolleybuses continue to run past the stadium, and visitors can also reach it via various other forms of public transportation. Additionally, the tram line runs nearby, with Socijalno station located approximately 600 meters from the stadium.

Stations nearby:

Service	Station/Stop	Lines
Trolleybus	Stadion Grbavica	101 102 103 107
Tram	Socijalno	2 3 4 5 6 7

== Notable matches ==
By far the most notable match played at the stadium was the 1984–85 UEFA Cup semifinal return leg on Wednesday, 24 April 1985 between Željezničar and Hungarian visitors Videoton FC from Székesfehérvár. Videoton brought a 1–3 advantage from the first leg, however, the home side fought valiantly in front of the raucous home crowd of 27,000 fans and was 2–0 ahead on goals by Edin Bahtić in the 5th and Edin Ćurić in the 62nd minute. Just a few minutes from the end, Željo still had a result that would see it go through and take on mighty Real Madrid in the UEFA Cup final. However, disaster struck in the 87th minute when Videoton right back József Csuhay was left unmarked and scored a goal for 2–1 that took his team to the final and saw Željezničar's hopes dashed in the cruelest of fashions.

=== FK Željezničar anniversary games ===
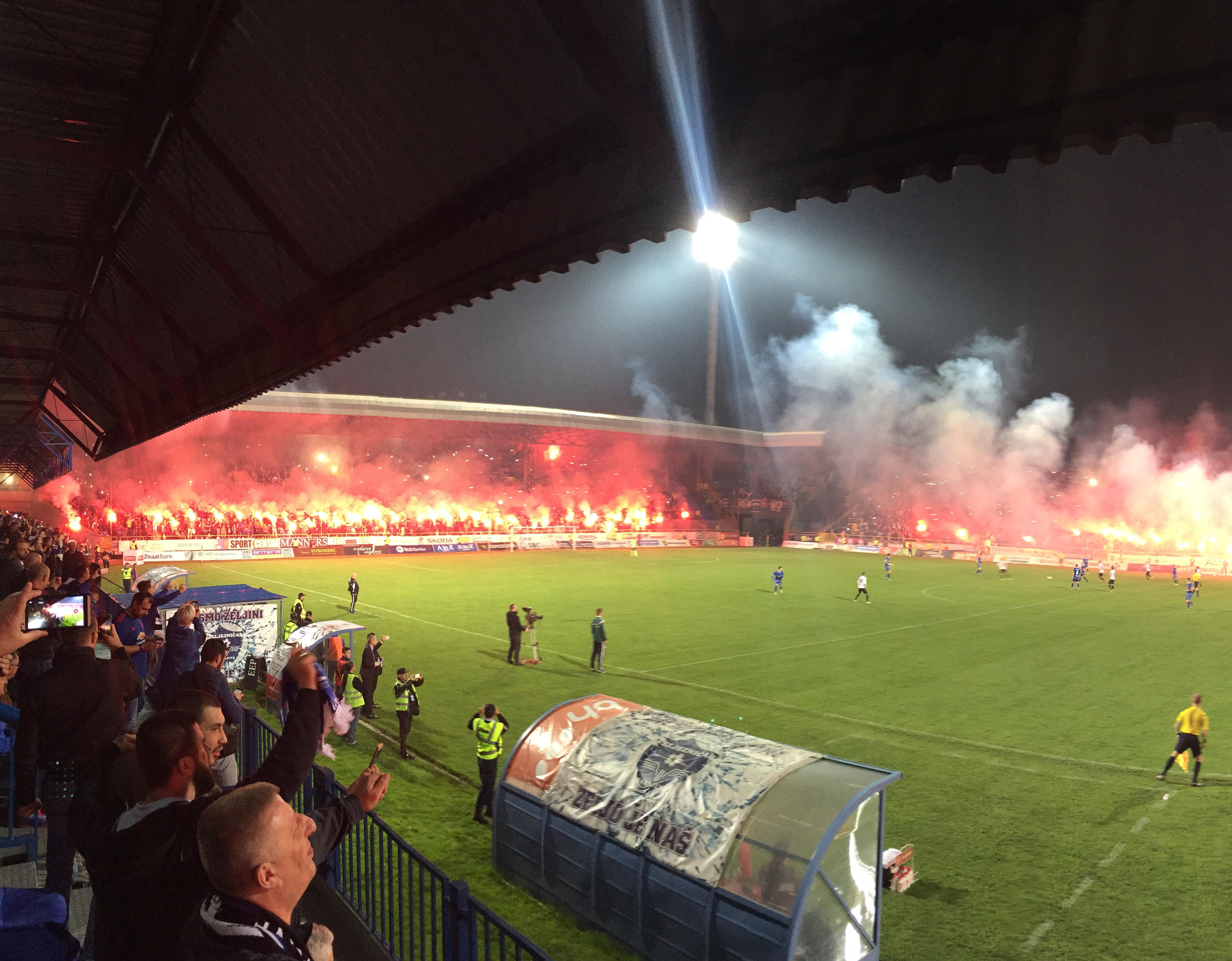
Home club supporters at Grbavica
- As part of the 50th birthday celebration on 16 June 1971, Željezničar played against Inter Milan. The final result was 3-3 (however location was Koševo Stadium).
- As part of the 55th birthday celebration of Željezničar (and 90th birthday celebration of Arsenal) played at Stadion Grbavica on August 15, 1976, Željezničar pulled out a friendly 1–1 draw with Arsenal.
- As part of the 60th birthday celebration of Željezničar, in 1981, Yugoslavia national team played against Željezničar at Grbavica Stadium.
- As part of the 80th birthday celebration of Željezničar, on October 2, 2001, the team welcomed Bundesliga side Wolfsburg with goals scored by Dželaludin Muharemović and Nermin Fatić Željo won 2-0.
- As part of the 90th birthday celebration of Željezničar, on November 8, 2011 the team welcomed a full strength Bosnia and Herzegovina national team and played a friendly that finished 1–2 in favor of the visitors. The scorer for the national team was Vedad Ibišević with two goals, while the lone scorer for Željezničar was Mirsad Bešlija.

=== International matches ===
Senior teams only.

Date		Result		Competition
14 October 1987	Yugoslavia	3–0	Northern Ireland	UEFA Euro 1988 qualifying
15 August 2001	Bosnia and Herzegovina	2–0	Malta	Friendly
27 March 2002	Bosnia and Herzegovina	4–4	Macedonia	Friendly
10 August 2010	Bosnia and Herzegovina	1–1	Qatar	Friendly
7 October 2017	Bosnia and Herzegovina	3–4	Belgium	2018 FIFA World Cup qualifying
15 October 2018	Bosnia and Herzegovina	2–0	Northern Ireland	2018–19 UEFA Nations League B
23 March 2019	Bosnia and Herzegovina	2–1	Armenia	UEFA Euro 2020 qualifying
8 October 2020	Bosnia and Herzegovina	1–1 (a.e.t.) (3–4 p)	Northern Ireland	UEFA Euro 2020 qualifying playoffs
31 March 2021	Bosnia and Herzegovina	0–1	France	2022 FIFA World Cup qualifying

== Concerts ==
Compared to Sarajevo's other football venue, Stadium Koševo, Grbavica has hosted far fewer music concerts. The handful of open air performances were:

- 25 July 1999 – The Kelly Family
- 10 August 2006 – Ljuba Aličić
- 6 July 2013 – Mladen Vojičić Tifa
- 13 August 2026 – The Prodigy

== See also ==
- List of football stadiums in Bosnia and Herzegovina
- FK Željezničar Sarajevo
