= 1984–85 UEFA Cup =

14th season of Europe's secondary club football tournament organised by UEFA

- Dates: 18 September 1984 – 22 May 1985

Final positions
- Champions: (Spain) Real Madrid (1st title)
- Runners-up: (Hungary) Videoton

Tournament statistics
- Matches played: 126
- Goals scored: 356 (2.83 per match)
- Top scorer(s): József Szabó (Videoton); 8 goals

The 1984–85 UEFA Cup was the 14th season of the UEFA Cup, the third-tier club football competition organised by the Union of European Football Associations (UEFA). The final was played over two legs at the Sóstói Stadion, Székesfehérvár, Hungary, and at the Santiago Bernabéu Stadium, Madrid, Spain. The competition was won by Real Madrid of Spain, who defeated Videoton of Hungary by an aggregate result of 3–1 to claim their first UEFA Cup title.

Real Madrid became the first Spanish side to win the UEFA Cup since its foundation in 1971. Three Spanish teams had won the predecessor tournament, the Inter-Cities Fairs' Cup, but UEFA does not recognise it as an official competition within its records. The last Spanish title at this level was achieved 18 years before, by long-time rivals Barcelona in 1966.

== Association team allocation ==
A total of 64 teams from 31 UEFA member associations participated in the 1984–85 UEFA Cup, all entering from the first round over six knock-out rounds. The association ranking based on the UEFA country coefficients is used to determine the number of participating teams for each association:

- Associations 1–3 each have four teams qualify.
- Associations 4–8 each have three teams qualify.
- Associations 9–21 each have two teams qualify.
- Associations 22–33 each have one team qualify.

=== Association ranking ===
For the 1984–85 UEFA Cup, the associations are allocated places according to their 1983 UEFA country coefficients, which takes into account their performance in European competitions from 1978–79 to 1982–83.

Association ranking for 1984–85 UEFA Cup

Rank	Association	Coeff.	Teams	Notes
1	West Germany	54.118	4	
2	Spain	34.999	4	
3	England	34.426	5	
4	(Socialist Federal Republic of Yugoslavia) Yugoslavia	29.550	3	
5	Belgium	29.216	3	
6	Scotland	29.000	3	
7	Czechoslovakia	27.050	3	
8	France	26.450	3	
9	Portugal	26.250	2	
10	Netherlands	24.966	2	
11	Italy	24.546	2	
12	Soviet Union	23.666	2	
13	East Germany	23.500	2	
14	Switzerland	21.750	2	
15	Sweden	20.500	2	
16	Romania	20.000	2	
-	Wales	18.000	0	

Rank	Association	Coeff.	Teams	Notes
17	Bulgaria	16.700	2	
18	Hungary	15.500	2	
19	Poland	15.250	2	
20	Denmark	13.749	2	
21	Austria	12.000	2	
22	Greece	10.500	1	
23	(Republic of Ireland) Republic of Ireland	9.665	1	
24	Albania	7.000	0	
25	Norway	6.249	1	
26	Turkey	5.333	1	
27	Cyprus	5.332	1	
28	(Northern Ireland) Northern Ireland	4.665	1	
29	Finland	3.832	1	
30	Luxembourg	3.666	1	
31	Iceland	2.998	1	
32	Malta	2.665	1	

Wales: There was no national league in Wales before 1992 and the only competition organised by the Football Association of Wales was the Welsh Cup so Wales had just a single participant in European competitions, the winner (or best placed Welsh team as several English teams also competed) of the Welsh Cup which competed in the UEFA Cup Winners' Cup. Its virtual ranking is only an original research, because the UEFA country ranking was only used to allocate the UEFA Cup spots at time, so Wales was not included.
Albania: Until 1985, Albania frequently withdrew their allocated place in the UEFA Cup due to political reasons. 17 Nëntori would have qualified by league position. This additional place went to title holders Tottenham Hotspur, who hadn't qualified for European competition in England.

=== Teams ===
The labels in parentheses show how each team qualified for competition:

- TH: Title holders
- CW: Cup winners
- CR: Cup runners-up
- LC: League Cup winners
- 2nd, 3rd, 4th, 5th, 6th, etc.: League position
- P-W: End-of-season European competition play-offs winners

Qualified teams for 1984–85 UEFA Cup
(West Germany) Hamburg (2nd)	(West Germany) Borussia Mönchengladbach (3rd)	(West Germany) Werder Bremen (5th)	(West Germany) Köln (6th)
(Spain) Real Madrid (2nd)	(Spain) Atlético Madrid (4th)	(Spain) Real Betis (5th)	(Spain) Real Valladolid (LC)
(England) Southampton (2nd)	(England) Nottingham Forest (3rd)	(England) Manchester United (4th)	(England) Queens Park Rangers (5th)
(England) Tottenham Hotspur (TH)	(Socialist Federal Republic of Yugoslavia) Partizan (2nd)	(Socialist Federal Republic of Yugoslavia) Željezničar (3rd)	(Socialist Federal Republic of Yugoslavia) Rijeka (4th)
(Belgium) Anderlecht (2nd)	(Belgium) Club Brugge (3rd)	(Belgium) Standard Liège (4th)	(Scotland) Dundee United (3rd)
(Scotland) Rangers (4th)	(Scotland) Heart of Midlothian (5th)	(Czechoslovakia) Dukla Prague (2nd)	(Czechoslovakia) Bohemians Prague (3rd)
(Czechoslovakia) Dukla Banská Bystrica (4th)	(France) Monaco (2nd)	(France) Auxerre (3rd)	(France) Paris Saint-Germain (4th)
(Portugal) Sporting CP (3rd)	(Portugal) Braga (4th)	(Netherlands) PSV Eindhoven (2nd)	(Netherlands) Ajax (3rd)
(Italy) Fiorentina (3rd)	(Italy) Internazionale (4th)	(Soviet Union) Spartak Moscow (2nd)	(Soviet Union) Dinamo Minsk (3rd)
(East Germany) Lokomotive Leipzig (3rd)	(East Germany) Vorwärts Frankfurt (4th)	(Switzerland) Sion (3rd)	(Switzerland) Neuchâtel Xamax (4th)
(Sweden) Östers (2nd)	(Sweden) AIK (3rd)	(Romania) Universitatea Craiova (3rd)	(Romania) Sportul Studențesc (4th)
(Bulgaria) Levski Sofia (2nd)	(Bulgaria) Sliven (7th)	(Hungary) Rába Győri ETO (2nd)	(Hungary) Videoton (3rd)
(Poland) Widzew Łódź (2nd)	(Poland) Pogoń Szczecin (3rd)	(Denmark) Odense BK (2nd)	(Denmark) AGF (3rd)
(Austria) LASK (3rd)	(Austria) SSW Innsbruck (4th)	(Greece) Olympiacos (2nd)	(Republic of Ireland) Bohemians (2nd)
(Norway) Lillestrøm (2nd)	(Turkey) Fenerbahçe (2nd)	(Cyprus) Apollon Limassol (2nd)	(Northern Ireland) Glentoran (2nd)
(Finland) HJK (2nd)	(Luxembourg) Red Boys Differdange (2nd)	(Iceland) KR (2nd)	(Malta) Rabat Ajax (2nd)

Notes

1. Bulgaria: At the end of the 1983-84 A Group season, Sliven qualified for the UEFA Cup by finishing 3rd in the standings, after the Bulgarian Football Union nullified the result of a previous loss due to Botev Vratsa fielding an ineligible player, awarding Sliven a 3-0 win by forfeit. In 2000, Spartak Varna appealed the result on the grounds that the team could have fought for the bronze medals if the decision had been made before the final matchday. The decision was overturned, and Sliven was credited with a 7th place finish in the 1984 standings.

== Schedule ==
The schedule of the competition was as follows. Matches were scheduled for Wednesdays, though some matches exceptionally took place on Tuesdays or Thursdays.

Schedule for 1984–85 UEFA Cup
Round	First leg	Second leg
First round	12–20 September 1984	2–3 October 1984
Second round	24 October 1984	7–8 November 1984
Third round	28 November 1984	12 December 1984
Quarter-finals	6 March 1985	20 March 1985
Semi-finals	10 April 1985	24 April 1985
Final	8 May 1985	22 May 1985

== First round ==
Team 1	Agg.	Team 2	1st leg	2nd leg
Köln (West Germany)	3–1	(Poland) Pogoń Szczecin	2–1	1–0
AIK (Sweden)	1–3	(Scotland) Dundee United	1–0	0–3
Monaco (France)	3–4	(Bulgaria) CSKA Septemvriysko Zname	2–2	1–2
Bohemians (Republic of Ireland)	3–4	(Scotland) Rangers	3–2	0–2
Dinamo Minsk (Soviet Union)	10–0	(Finland) HJK	4–0	6–0
Red Boys Differdange (Luxembourg)	0–14	(Netherlands) Ajax	0–0	0–14
Bohemians ČKD Praha (Czechoslovakia)	8–3	(Cyprus) Apollon Limassol	6–1	2–2
Sion (Switzerland)	4–2	(Spain) Atlético Madrid	1–0	3–2
Sliven (Bulgaria)	2–5	(Socialist Federal Republic of Yugoslavia) Željezničar	1–0	1–5
Vorwärts Frankfurt (East Germany)	2–3	(Netherlands) PSV Eindhoven	2–0	0–3
Fenerbahçe (Turkey)	0–3	(Italy) Fiorentina	0–1	0–2
Dukla Banská Bystrica (Czechoslovakia)	3–7	(West Germany) Borussia Mönchengladbach	2–3	1–4
Glentoran (Northern Ireland)	1–3	(Belgium) Standard Liège	1–1	0–2
KR (Iceland)	0–7	(England) Queens Park Rangers	0–3	0–4
Lokomotive Leipzig (East Germany)	7–3	(Norway) Lillestrøm	7–0	0–3
Manchester United (England)	5–2	(Hungary) Rába ETO Győr	3–0	2–2
Nottingham Forest (England)	0–1	(Belgium) Club Brugge	0–0	0–1
OB (Denmark)	2–7	(Soviet Union) Spartak Moskva	1–5	1–2
Olympiacos (Greece)	3–2	(Switzerland) Neuchâtel Xamax	1–0	2–2
Öster (Sweden)	0–2	(Austria) LASK	0–1	0–1
Paris Saint-Germain (France)	6–2	(Scotland) Heart of Midlothian	4–0	2–2
Anderlecht (Belgium)	2–2 (a)	(West Germany) Werder Bremen	1–0	1–2
Rabat Ajax (Malta)	0–4	(Socialist Federal Republic of Yugoslavia) Partizan	0–2	0–2
Real Betis (Spain)	1–1 (3–5 p)	(Romania) Universitatea Craiova	1–0	0–1 (a.e.t.)
Real Madrid (Spain)	5–2	(Austria) SSW Innsbruck	5–0	0–2
Real Valladolid (Spain)	2–4	(Socialist Federal Republic of Yugoslavia) Rijeka	1–0	1–4
Braga (Portugal)	0–9	(England) Tottenham Hotspur	0–3	0–6
Southampton (England)	0–2	(West Germany) Hamburg	0–0	0–2
Sporting CP (Portugal)	4–2	(France) Auxerre	2–0	2–2 (a.e.t.)
Sportul Studenţesc (Romania)	1–2	(Italy) Internazionale	1–0	0–2
Videoton (Hungary)	1–0	(Czechoslovakia) Dukla Praha	1–0	0–0
Widzew Łódź (Poland)	2–1	(Denmark) AGF	2–0	0–1

=== First leg ===
12 September 1984
16:30

Rabat Ajax (Malta)	0–2	(Socialist Federal Republic of Yugoslavia) Partizan
		Vučićević 63'; Đelmaš 70'

Ta' Qali National Stadium, Ta' Qali
Attendance: 6,000
Referee: Jakob Baumann (Switzerland)

18 September 1984
17:30

Videoton (Hungary)	1–0	(Czechoslovakia) Dukla Praha
Szabó 37'

Sóstói Stadion, Székesfehérvár
Attendance: 8,000
Referee: Yusuf Namoğlu (Turkey)

18 September 1984
18:00

KR (Iceland)	0–3	(England) Queens Park Rangers
		Stainrod 24', 76'; Bannister 64'

Laugardalsvöllur, Reykjavík
Attendance: 2,000
Referee: Oliver Donnelly (Northern Ireland)

18 September 1984
19:30

Red Boys Differdange (Luxembourg)	0–0	(Netherlands) Ajax

Stade du Thillenberg, Differdange
Attendance: 2,300
Referee: Ib Nielsen (Denmark)

18 September 1984
20:30

Glentoran (Northern Ireland)	1–1	(Belgium) Standard Liège
Bowers 2'		Telen 59'

The Oval, Belfast
Attendance: 4,000
Referee: Kenny Hope (Scotland)

18 September 1984
21:00

Bohemians (Republic of Ireland)	3–2	(Scotland) Rangers
O'Brien 24', 36'; Lawless 53'		McCoist 7'; McPherson 29'

Dalymount Park, Dublin
Attendance: 10,000
Referee: Frangcon Roberts (Wales)

19 September 1984
16:00

Sliven (Bulgaria)	1–0	(Socialist Federal Republic of Yugoslavia) Željezničar
Demirev 89'

Stadion Hadzhi Dimitar, Sliven
Attendance: 15,000
Referee: Antonín Řezníček (Czechoslovakia)

19 September 1984
16:00

Lokomotive Leipzig (East Germany)	7–0	(Norway) Lillestrøm
Zötzsche 17' (pen.), 57' (pen.); Baum 44'; Lindner 69'; D. Kühn 78', 84', 89'

Bruno-Plache-Stadion, Leipzig
Attendance: 12,000
Referee: Franz Latzin (Austria)

19 September 1984
17:00

Bohemians ČKD Praha (Czechoslovakia)	6–1	(Cyprus) Apollon Limassol
Mičinec 24', 28', 65'; Janečka 33', 54' (pen.); V. Hruška 86'		Jenkins 73'

Ďolíček, Prague
Attendance: 3,248
Referee: Lajos Hartmann (Hungary)

19 September 1984
17:00

Dukla Banská Bystrica (Czechoslovakia)	2–3	(West Germany) Borussia Mönchengladbach
Nemec 30', 65' (pen.)		Hochstätter 25'; Criens 71'; Lienen 77'

Štiavničky, Banská Bystrica
Attendance: 13,923
Referee: Peer Frickmann (Denmark)

19 September 1984
18:00

Dinamo Minsk (Soviet Union)	4–0	(Finland) HJK
Kondratiev 22', 28', 39'; Shalimo 60'

Dinamo Stadium, Minsk
Attendance: 32,000
Referee: Octavian Streng (Romania)

19 September 1984
18:00

Fenerbahçe (Turkey)	0–1	(Italy) Fiorentina
		Pecci 18'

Şükrü Saracoğlu Stadyumu, Istanbul
Attendance: 11,886
Referee: Romualdas Juška (Soviet Union)

19 September 1984
19:00

AIK (Sweden)	1–0	(Scotland) Dundee United
T. Andersson 13'

Råsunda fotbollsstadion, Solna
Attendance: 5,721
Referee: Volker Roth (West Germany)

19 September 1984
19:00

Öster (Sweden)	0–1	(Austria) LASK
		Höld 84'

Värendsvallen, Växjö
Attendance: 518
Referee: Jiří Stiegler (Czechoslovakia)

19 September 1984
19:30

OB (Denmark)	1–5	(Soviet Union) Spartak Moskva
Utoft 17'		Gavrilov 26'; Sidorov 43'; Shavlo 57'; Rodionov 59'; Kuznetsov 64'

Odense Stadion, Odense
Attendance: 3,308
Referee: Henk van Ettekoven (Netherlands)

19 September 1984
19:30

Olympiacos (Greece)	1–0	(Switzerland) Neuchâtel Xamax
Mitropoulos 2'

O.A.K.A "Spyros Louis", Athens
Attendance: 61,978
Referee: Vladimir Kuznetsov (Soviet Union)

19 September 1984
20:00

Köln (West Germany)	2–1	(Poland) Pogoń Szczecin
Engels 52'; Littbarski 76'		Haas 35' (o.g.)

Müngersdorfer Stadion, Cologne
Attendance: 17,000
Referee: Edwin Borg (Malta)

19 September 1984
20:00

Vorwärts Frankfurt (East Germany)	2–0	(Netherlands) PSV Eindhoven
Hendel 7'; Pietsch 62'

Stadion der Freundschaft, Frankfurt (Oder)
Attendance: 15,000
Referee: Georges Konrath (France)

19 September 1984
20:00

Anderlecht (Belgium)	1–0	(West Germany) Werder Bremen
Czerniatynski 88'

Stade Constant Vanden Stock, Brussels
Attendance: 30,000
Referee: Valeri Butenko (Soviet Union)

19 September 1984
20:15

Sion (Switzerland)	1–0	(Spain) Atlético Madrid
Cina 75'

Stade de Tourbillon, Sion
Attendance: 7,500
Referee: Aron Schmidhuber (West Germany)

19 September 1984
20:30

Monaco (France)	2–2	(Bulgaria) CSKA Septemvriysko Zname
Genghini 8', 19'		Slavkov 14'; Markov 16'

Stade Louis II, Monaco
Attendance: 18,307
Referee: Emilio Soriano Aladrén (Spain)

19 September 1984
20:30

Manchester United (England)	3–0	(Hungary) Rába ETO Győr
Robson 17'; Mühren 37'; Hughes 74'

Old Trafford, Manchester
Attendance: 32,537
Referee: José Rosa dos Santos (Portugal)

19 September 1984
20:30

Nottingham Forest (England)	0–0	(Belgium) Club Brugge

City Ground, Nottingham
Attendance: 18,307
Referee: Werner Föckler (West Germany)

19 September 1984
20:30

Paris Saint-Germain (France)	4–0	(Scotland) Heart of Midlothian
Sušić 22', 57'; Rocheteau 36'; Niederbacher 62'

Parc des Princes, Paris
Attendance: 21,639
Referee: Edvard Šoštarič (Yugoslavia)

19 September 1984
20:30

Southampton (England)	0–0	(West Germany) Hamburg

The Dell, Southampton
Attendance: 19,178
Referee: Roger Schoeters (Belgium)

19 September 1984
21:00

Real Betis (Spain)	1–0	(Romania) Universitatea Craiova
Suárez 79'

Estadio Benito Villamarín, Seville
Attendance: 25,000
Referee: Michel Vautrot (France)

19 September 1984
21:00

Real Madrid (Spain)	5–0	(Austria) SSW Innsbruck
Míchel 2', 58'; Santillana 6'; Juanito 51' (pen.); Butragueño 54'

Santiago Bernabéu, Madrid
Attendance: 55,000
Referee: Siegfried Kirschen (East Germany)

19 September 1984
21:00

Real Valladolid (Spain)	1–0	(Socialist Federal Republic of Yugoslavia) Rijeka
Da Silva 66'

Estadio José Zorrilla, Valladolid
Attendance: 22,000
Referee: Paolo Bergamo (Italy)

19 September 1984
22:00

Sporting CP (Portugal)	2–0	(France) Auxerre
Manuel Fernandes 54'; Pacheco 80'

Estádio José Alvalade, Lisbon
Attendance: 50,250
Referee: Gerald Losert (Austria)

19 September 1984
22:30

Braga (Portugal)	0–3	(England) Tottenham Hotspur
		Falco 31', 42'; Galvin 44'

Estádio 1º de Maio, Braga
Attendance: 25,000
Referee: Gérard Biguet (France)

20 September 1984
15:30

Widzew Łódź (Poland)	2–0	(Denmark) AGF
Dziekanowski 21' (pen.); Świątek 52'

Stadion Widzewa, Łódź
Attendance: 15,000
Referee: Berisha Şinasi (Yugoslavia)

20 September 1984
16:00

Sportul Studenţesc (Romania)	1–0	(Italy) Internazionale
Sandu 84'

Stadionul 23 August, Bucharest
Attendance: 25,000
Referee: Augusto Lamo Castillo (Spain)

=== Second leg ===
2 October 1984
17:00

Dukla Praha (Czechoslovakia)	0–0	(Hungary) Videoton

Stadion Juliska, Prague
Attendance: 3,000
Referee: Bo Helén (Sweden)

Videoton won 1–0 on aggregate.

2 October 1984
20:45

Queens Park Rangers (England)	4–0	(Iceland) KR
Bannister 11', 17', 60'; Charles 28'

Highbury Stadium, London
Attendance: 6,196
Referee: Robert Finn (Republic of Ireland)

Queens Park Rangers won 7–0 on aggregate.

3 October 1984
13:30

Universitatea Craiova (Romania)	1–0 (a.e.t.)	(Spain) Real Betis
Cîrțu 46'
Penalties
Irimescu (penalty scored); Bîcu (penalty scored); Cîrțu (penalty scored); Ştefănescu (penalty scored); O. Popescu (penalty scored)	5–3	(penalty scored) Casado; (penalty missed) Rincón; (penalty scored) Mantilla; (penalty scored) Calleja

Stadionul Central, Craiova
Attendance: 35,000
Referee: Heinz Fahnler (Austria)

1–1 on aggregate; Universitatea Craiova won 5–3 on penalties.

3 October 1984
15:30

Lillestrøm (Norway)	3–0	(East Germany) Lokomotive Leipzig
Eilertsen 13'; Krogsæter 55'; Forsnes 70'

Åråsen stadion, Lillestrøm
Attendance: 416
Referee: David Richardson (England)

Lokomotive Leipzig won 7–3 on aggregate.

3 October 1984
16:00

Pogoń Szczecin (Poland)	0–1	(West Germany) Köln
		Bein 71'

Stadion Miejski im. Floriana Krygiera, Szczecin
Attendance: 25,000
Referee: Arto Ravander (Finland)

Köln won 3–1 on aggregate.

3 October 1984
17:00

Željezničar (Socialist Federal Republic of Yugoslavia)	5–1	(Bulgaria) Sliven
Ćurić 20'; Bahtić 28', 55', 70'; Baljić 65'		Simeonov 16'

Stadion Grbavica, Sarajevo
Attendance: 15,000
Referee: Anatoli Milchenko (Soviet Union)

Željezničar won 5–2 on aggregate.

3 October 1984
17:00

Spartak Moskva (Soviet Union)	2–1	(Denmark) OB
Cherenkov 18'; Sidorov 65'		Rasmussen 43'

Tsentralniy stadion im. V.I. Lenina, Moscow
Attendance: 19,500
Referee: Stefanos Hatzistefanou (Cyprus)

Spartak Moskva won 7–2 on aggregate.

3 October 1984
17:30

HJK (Finland)	0–6	(Soviet Union) Dinamo Minsk
		Gotsmanov 4', 29', 50', 89'; Melnikov 20'; Kondratiev 22'

Helsingin olympiastadion, Helsinki
Attendance: 1,185
Referee: Michał Listkiewicz (Poland)

Dinamo Minsk won 10–0 on aggregate.

3 October 1984
17:30

Partizan (Socialist Federal Republic of Yugoslavia)	2–0	(Malta) Rabat Ajax
Mance 18'; Stevanović 64'

Stadion JNA, Belgrade
Attendance: 12,000
Referee: Vasos Konstantinou (Cyprus)

Partizan won 4–0 on aggregate.

3 October 1984
18:00

Rijeka (Socialist Federal Republic of Yugoslavia)	4–1	(Spain) Real Valladolid
Fegic 5', 77'; Hrstić 24'; Desnica 84'		Moré 26'

Stadion Kantrida, Rijeka
Attendance: 12,000
Referee: Karl-Heinz Tritschler (West Germany)

Rijeka won 4–2 on aggregate.

3 October 1984
18:30

CSKA Septemvriysko Zname (Bulgaria)	2–1	(France) Monaco
S. Mladenov 7'; Zdravkov 13' (pen.)		Tibeuf 75'

Stadion Narodna Armia, Sofia
Attendance: 30,000
Referee: Talal Tokat (Turkey)

CSKA Septemvriysko Zname won 4–3 on aggregate.

3 October 1984
19:00

Apollon Limassol (Cyprus)	2–2	(Czechoslovakia) Bohemians ČKD Praha
Kenny 75'; Stylianou 81'		Janečka 38'; Škoda 59'

Tsirio Stadio, Limassol
Attendance: 6,000
Referee: Ahmed Yasharov (Bulgaria)

Bohemians ČKD Praha won 8–3 on aggregate.

3 October 1984
19:00

Rába ETO Győr (Hungary)	2–2	(England) Manchester United
Preszeller 51'; Hannich 58'		Brazil 10'; Mühren 75' (pen.)

Rába ETO Stadion, Győr
Attendance: 26,000
Referee: Alphonse Constantin (Belgium)

Manchester United won 5–2 on aggregate.

3 October 1984
19:30

PSV Eindhoven (Netherlands)	3–0	(East Germany) Vorwärts Frankfurt
Brandts 17'; Brylle 18'; Valke 87'

Philips Stadion, Eindhoven
Attendance: 16,863
Referee: Ángel Franco Martínez (Spain)

PSV Eindhoven won 3–2 on aggregate.

3 October 1984
19:30

AGF (Denmark)	1–0	(Poland) Widzew Łódź
Lundkvist 21'

Aarhus Idrætspark, Århus
Attendance: 4,000
Referee: Guðmundur Haraldsson (Iceland)

Widzew Łódź won 2–1 on aggregate.

3 October 1984
20:00

Fiorentina (Italy)	2–0	(Turkey) Fenerbahçe
Passarella 33' (pen.); Pulici 83'

Stadio Comunale, Florence
Attendance: 15,000
Referee: Brian McGinlay (Scotland)

Fiorentina won 3–0 on aggregate.

3 October 1984
20:00

Borussia Mönchengladbach (West Germany)	4–1	(Czechoslovakia) Dukla Banská Bystrica
Herbst 27'; Rahn 50', 51', 66'		Targoš 53'

Bökelbergstadion, Mönchengladbach
Attendance: 12,000
Referee: Stjepan Glavina (Yugoslavia)

Borussia Mönchengladbach won 7–3 on aggregate.

3 October 1984
20:00

Standard Liège (Belgium)	2–0	(Northern Ireland) Glentoran
Dardenne 9'; Jelikić 50'

Stade Maurice-Dufrasne, Liège
Attendance: 8,624
Referee: Erik Steen Jensen (Denmark)

Standard Liège won 3–1 on aggregate.

3 October 1984
20:00

Club Brugge (Belgium)	1–0	(England) Nottingham Forest
Wellens 89'

Olympiastadion, Bruges
Attendance: 26,800
Referee: Claude Bouillet (France)

Club Brugge won 1–0 on aggregate.

3 October 1984
20:00

Neuchâtel Xamax (Switzerland)	2–2	(Greece) Olympiacos
Lüthi 25'; Zaugg 71'		Anastopoulos 53', 89'

Stade de la Maladière, Neuchâtel
Attendance: 11,200
Referee: Adolf Prokop (East Germany)

Olympiacos won 3–2 on aggregate.

3 October 1984
20:00

LASK (Austria)	1–0	(Sweden) Öster
Hagmayr 45'

Linzer Stadion, Linz
Attendance: 10,500
Referee: Makis Germanakos (Greece)

Linzer ASK won 2–0 on aggregate.

3 October 1984
20:00

SSW Innsbruck (Austria)	2–0	(Spain) Real Madrid
Roscher 20', 64'

Tivoli-Stadion, Innsbruck
Attendance: 4,500
Referee: László Pádár (Hungary)

Real Madrid won 5–2 on aggregate.

3 October 1984
20:00

Hamburg (West Germany)	2–0	(England) Southampton
Kaltz 69' (pen.); McGhee 89'

Volksparkstadion, Hamburg
Attendance: 28,000
Referee: Paolo Bergamo (Italy)

Hamburg won 2–0 on aggregate.

3 October 1984
20:00

Auxerre (France)	2–2 (a.e.t.)	(Portugal) Sporting CP
Szarmach 16', 84'		Oceano 93'; Litos 119'

Stade de l'Abbé-Deschamps, Auxerre
Attendance: 21,250
Referee: Bob Valentine (Scotland)

Sporting CP won 4–2 on aggregate.

3 October 1984
20:15

Ajax (Netherlands)	14–0	(Luxembourg) Red Boys Differdange
Spelbos 5' (pen.); Koeman 9', 73', 78' van Basten 15', 39', 49', 65', 84'; Bosman 18', 82'; Rijkaard 47'; Vanenburg 57'; Schoenaker 71'

Stadion De Meer, Amsterdam
Attendance: 9,240
Referee: Eamonn Farrell (Republic of Ireland)

Ajax won 14–0 on aggregate.

3 October 1984
20:30

Dundee United (Scotland)	3–0	(Sweden) AIK
Sturrock 46'; Milne 69', 72'

Tannadice Park, Dundee
Attendance: 11,427
Referee: Victoriano Sánchez Arminio (Spain)

Dundee United won 3–1 on aggregate.

3 October 1984
20:30

Rangers (Scotland)	2–0	(Republic of Ireland) Bohemians
Paterson 84'; Redford 89'

Ibrox Park, Glasgow
Attendance: 33,000
Referee: Malcolm Moffatt (Northern Ireland)

Rangers won 4–3 on aggregate.

3 October 1984
20:30

Heart of Midlothian (Scotland)	2–2	(France) Paris Saint-Germain
Robertson 27', 86'		Niederbacher 10'; Jeannol 44'

Tynecastle Stadium, Edinburgh
Attendance: 10,023
Referee: Ulf Eriksson (Sweden)

Paris Saint-Germain won 6–2 on aggregate.

3 October 1984
20:30

Werder Bremen (West Germany)	2–1	(Belgium) Anderlecht
Sidka 48' (pen.), 60'		Sidka 63' (o.g.)

Weserstadion, Bremen
Attendance: 36,000
Referee: Alain Delmer (France)

2–2 on aggregate; Anderlecht won on away goals.

3 October 1984
20:45

Internazionale (Italy)	2–0	(Romania) Sportul Studenţesc
Brady 69'; Rummenigge 85'

Stadio Giuseppe Meazza, Milan
Attendance: 52,600
Referee: Erik Fredriksson (Sweden)

Internazionale won 2–1 on aggregate.

3 October 1984
21:00

Atlético Madrid (Spain)	2–3	(Switzerland) Sion
Sánchez 16' (pen.); Pedraza 38'		Marina 1' (o.g.); Cina 4', 14'

Estadio Vicente Calderón, Madrid
Attendance: 25,000
Referee: Alan Robinson (England)

Sion won 4–2 on aggregate.

3 October 1984
21:00

Tottenham Hotspur (England)	6–0	(Portugal) Braga
Stevens 10'; Hughton 15'; Crooks 27', 57', 82'; Falco 66'

White Hart Lane, London
Attendance: 22,478
Referee: Klaus Scheurell (East Germany)

Tottenham Hotspur won 9–0 on aggregate.

== Second round ==
Team 1	Agg.	Team 2	1st leg	2nd leg
Fiorentina (Italy)	3–7	(Belgium) Anderlecht	1–1	2–6
Ajax (Netherlands)	1–1 (2–4 p)	(Czechoslovakia) Bohemians ČKD Praha	1–0	0–1 (a.e.t.)
Borussia Mönchengladbach (West Germany)	3–3 (a)	(Poland) Widzew Łódź	3–2	0–1
Club Brugge (Belgium)	2–4	(England) Tottenham Hotspur	2–1	0–3
Universitatea Craiova (Romania)	2–0	(Greece) Olympiacos	1–0	1–0
Željezničar (Socialist Federal Republic of Yugoslavia)	3–2	(Switzerland) Sion	2–1	1–1
Hamburg (West Germany)	6–1	(Bulgaria) CSKA Septemvriysko Zname	4–0	2–1
Internazionale (Italy)	4–3	(Scotland) Rangers	3–0	1–3
LASK (Austria)	2–7	(Scotland) Dundee United	1–2	1–5
Lokomotive Leipzig (East Germany)	1–3	(Soviet Union) Spartak Moskva	1–1	0–2
Rijeka (Socialist Federal Republic of Yugoslavia)	3–4	(Spain) Real Madrid	3–1	0–3
Paris Saint-Germain (France)	2–5	(Hungary) Videoton	2–4	0–1
PSV Eindhoven (Netherlands)	0–1	(England) Manchester United	0–0	0–1 (a.e.t.)
Queens Park Rangers (England)	6–6 (a)	(Socialist Federal Republic of Yugoslavia) Partizan	6–2	0–4
Sporting CP (Portugal)	2–2 (3–5p)	(Soviet Union) Dinamo Minsk	2–0	0–2 (a.e.t.)
Standard Liège (Belgium)	1–4	(West Germany) Köln	0–2	1–2

=== First leg ===
24 October 1984
14:00

Universitatea Craiova (Romania)	1–0	(Greece) Olympiacos
Cîrțu 17'

Stadionul Central, Craiova
Attendance: 40,000
Referee: Paolo Bergamo (Italy)

24 October 1984
14:00

Lokomotive Leipzig (East Germany)	1–1	(Soviet Union) Spartak Moskva
Zötzsche 84' (pen.)		Gavrilov 7'

Bruno-Plache-Stadion, Leipzig
Attendance: 14,500
Referee: Bruno Galler (Switzerland)

24 October 1984
17:00

Željezničar (Socialist Federal Republic of Yugoslavia)	2–1	(Switzerland) Sion
Bahtić 25', 84'		Šabanadžović 75' (o.g.)

Stadion Grbavica, Sarajevo
Attendance: 22,000
Referee: Yusuf Namoğlu (Turkey)

24 October 1984
18:00

Rijeka (Socialist Federal Republic of Yugoslavia)	3–1	(Spain) Real Madrid
Fegic 39', 58'; Matrljan 40'		Isidro 81'

Stadion Kantrida, Rijeka
Attendance: 25,000
Referee: Keith Hackett (England)

24 October 1984
19:00

LASK (Austria)	1–2	(Scotland) Dundee United
Hagmayr 26'		Kirkwood 15'; Bannon 88' (pen.)

Linzer Stadion, Linz
Attendance: 18,500
Referee: Ioan Igna (Romania)

24 October 1984
19:30

PSV Eindhoven (Netherlands)	0–0	(England) Manchester United

Philips Stadion, Eindhoven
Attendance: 24,775
Referee: Ulf Eriksson (Sweden)

24 October 1984
20:00

Borussia Mönchengladbach (West Germany)	3–2	(Poland) Widzew Łódź
Rahn 22'; Criens 32'; Herbst 61'		Wraga 56'; Myśliński 68'

Bökelbergstadion, Mönchengladbach
Attendance: 16,000
Referee: Yuri Savchenko (Soviet Union)

24 October 1984
20:00

Club Brugge (Belgium)	2–1	(England) Tottenham Hotspur
Ceulemans 5'; Jensen 80' (pen.)		Allen 82'

Olympiastadion, Bruges
Attendance: 25,000
Referee: André Daina (Switzerland)

24 October 1984
20:00

Hamburg (West Germany)	4–0	(Bulgaria) CSKA Septemvriysko Zname
McGhee 19' von Heesen 43', 89'; Magath 62'

Volksparkstadion, Hamburg
Attendance: 19,000
Referee: Robert Wurtz (France)

24 October 1984
20:00

Standard Liège (Belgium)	0–2	(West Germany) Köln
		Littbarski 38'; Bein 80'

Stade Maurice-Dufrasne, Liège
Attendance: 15,500
Referee: Edvard Šoštarič (Yugoslavia)

24 October 1984
20:15

Ajax (Netherlands)	1–0	(Czechoslovakia) Bohemians ČKD Praha
Bosman 27'

Stadion De Meer, Amsterdam
Attendance: 9,240
Referee: Adolf Prokop (East Germany)

24 October 1984
20:30

Fiorentina (Italy)	1–1	(Belgium) Anderlecht
Sócrates 22'		Vandenbergh 50'

Stadio Comunale, Florence
Attendance: 55,500
Referee: George Courtney (England)

24 October 1984
20:30

Paris Saint-Germain (France)	2–4	(Hungary) Videoton
Rocheteau 75', 83'		Szabó 2', 28'; Csongrádi 54', 73'

Parc des Princes, Paris
Attendance: 20,000
Referee: Alan Robinson (England)

24 October 1984
20:45

Internazionale (Italy)	3–0	(Scotland) Rangers
Sabato 17'; Causio 67'; Rummenigge 87'

Stadio Giuseppe Meazza, Milan
Attendance: 65,591
Referee: Volker Roth (West Germany)

24 October 1984
20:45

Queens Park Rangers (England)	6–2	(Socialist Federal Republic of Yugoslavia) Partizan
Gregory 13'; Fereday 26'; Stainrod 44'; Neill 54'; Bannister 57', 83'		Klinčarski 14'; Mance 25'

Highbury Stadium, London
Attendance: 7,836
Referee: Karl-Heinz Tritschler (West Germany)

24 October 1984
22:00

Sporting CP (Portugal)	2–0	(Soviet Union) Dinamo Minsk
Borovsky 48' (o.g.); Manuel Fernandes 90'

Estádio José Alvalade, Lisbon
Attendance: 70,000
Referee: Howard King (Wales)

=== Second leg ===
7 November 1984
13:00

Spartak Moskva (Soviet Union)	2–0	(East Germany) Lokomotive Leipzig
Gavrilov 26'; Rodionov 47'

Tsentralniy stadion im. V.I. Lenina, Moscow
Attendance: 15,500
Referee: Svein-Inge Thime (Norway)

Spartak Moskva won 3–1 on aggregate.

7 November 1984
15:00

Dinamo Minsk (Soviet Union)	2–0 (a.e.t.)	(Portugal) Sporting CP
Sokol 4', 18'
Penalties
Sokol (penalty scored); Kondratiev (penalty scored); Zygmantovich (penalty scored); Kurnenin (penalty scored); Aleinikov (penalty scored)	5–3	(penalty scored) Jordão; (penalty scored) Manuel Fernandes; (penalty scored) Litos; (penalty missed) Carlos Xavier

Dinamo Stadium, Minsk
Attendance: 32,000
Referee: Dieter Pauly (West Germany)

2–2 on aggregate; Dinamo Minsk won 5–3 on penalties.

7 November 1984
16:30

Bohemians ČKD Praha (Czechoslovakia)	1–0 (a.e.t.)	(Netherlands) Ajax
Sloup 80'
Penalties
Levý (penalty scored); Janečka (penalty scored); Sloup (penalty scored); Kukučka (penalty scored)	4–2	(penalty missed) Spelbos; (penalty scored) Ophof; (penalty scored) Koeman; (penalty missed) Schoenaker

Ďolíček, Prague
Attendance: 18,000
Referee: David Syme (Scotland)

1–1 on aggregate; Bohemians ČKD Praha won 4–2 on penalties.

7 November 1984
17:00

Widzew Łódź (Poland)	1–0	(West Germany) Borussia Mönchengladbach
Smolarek 65'

Stadion Widzewa, Łódź
Attendance: 25,000
Referee: Joël Quiniou (France)

3–3 on aggregate; Widzew Łódź won on away goals.

7 November 1984
17:00

CSKA Septemvriysko Zname (Bulgaria)	1–2	(West Germany) Hamburg
Zdravkov 89'		Wuttke 8'; McGhee 53'

Stadion Narodna Armia, Sofia
Attendance: 9,000
Referee: Ron Bridges (Wales)

Hamburg won 6–1 on aggregate.

7 November 1984
17:30

Partizan (Socialist Federal Republic of Yugoslavia)	4–0	(England) Queens Park Rangers
Mance 4'; Kaličanin 40' (pen.); Ješić 46'; Živković 64'

Stadion JNA, Belgrade
Attendance: 60,000
Referee: Valeri Butenko (Soviet Union)

6–6 on aggregate; Partizan won on away goals.

7 November 1984
18:00

Olympiacos (Greece)	0–1	(Romania) Universitatea Craiova
		Cîrțu 75'

O.A.K.A. "Spyros Louis", Athens
Attendance: 80,000
Referee: Alexis Ponnet (Belgium)

Universitatea Craiova won 2–0 on aggregate.

7 November 1984
20:00

Anderlecht (Belgium)	6–2	(Italy) Fiorentina
De Groote 12'; Czerniatynski 59'; Vandenbergh 60'; Frimann 69'; Vercauteren 77' (pen.); Scifo 83' (pen.)		Sócrates 50' (pen.); Iachini 70'

Stade Constant Vanden Stock, Brussels
Attendance: 41,000
Referee: Dušan Krchňák (Czechoslovakia)

Anderlecht won 7–3 on aggregate.

7 November 1984
20:00

Sion (Switzerland)	1–1	(Socialist Federal Republic of Yugoslavia) Željezničar
Cina 88'		Ćurić 76'

Stade de Tourbillon, Sion
Attendance: 9,000
Referee: Gerard Geurds (Netherlands)

Željezničar won 3–2 on aggregate.

7 November 1984
20:00

Köln (West Germany)	2–1	(Belgium) Standard Liège
Strack 41'; Allofs 54'		Gründel 75'

Müngersdorfer Stadion, Cologne
Attendance: 26,000
Referee: Heinz Fahnler (Austria)

Köln won 4–1 on aggregate.

7 November 1984
20:30

Rangers (Scotland)	3–1	(Italy) Internazionale
Mitchell 5'; I. Ferguson 17', 55'		Altobelli 15'

Ibrox Park, Glasgow
Attendance: 33,000
Referee: Vojtech Christov (Czechoslovakia)

Internazionale won 4–3 on aggregate.

7 November 1984
20:30

Dundee United (Scotland)	5–1	(Austria) LASK
Hegarty 15'; Coyne 45', 58'; Gough 75'; Beaumont 88'		Hagmayr 33'

Tannadice Park, Dundee
Attendance: 10,185
Referee: Klaus Scheurell (East Germany)

Dundee United won 7–2 on aggregate.

7 November 1984
20:30

Manchester United (England)	1–0 (a.e.t.)	(Netherlands) PSV Eindhoven
Strachan 92' (pen.)

Old Trafford, Manchester
Attendance: 39,281
Referee: Luigi Agnolin (Italy)

Manchester United won 1–0 on aggregate.

7 November 1984
21:00

Tottenham Hotspur (England)	3–0	(Belgium) Club Brugge
Hazard 5'; Allen 28'; Roberts 37'

White Hart Lane, London
Attendance: 34,356
Referee: Augusto Lamo Castillo (Spain)

Tottenham Hotspur won 4–2 on aggregate.

7 November 1984
21:00

Real Madrid (Spain)	3–0	(Socialist Federal Republic of Yugoslavia) Rijeka
Juanito 67' (pen.); Santillana 79'; Valdano 82'

Santiago Bernabéu, Madrid
Attendance: 55,000
Referee: Roger Schoeters (Belgium)

Real Madrid won 4–3 on aggregate.

8 November 1984
16:30

Videoton (Hungary)	1–0	(France) Paris Saint-Germain
Májer 54'

Sóstói Stadion, Székesfehérvár
Attendance: 25,000
Referee: Aron Schmidhuber (West Germany)

Videoton won 5–2 on aggregate.

== Third round ==
Team 1	Agg.	Team 2	1st leg	2nd leg
Spartak Moskva (Soviet Union)	1–2	(West Germany) Köln	1–0	0–2
Universitatea Craiova (Romania)	2–4	(Socialist Federal Republic of Yugoslavia) Željezničar	2–0	0–4
Hamburg (West Germany)	2–2 (a)	(Italy) Internazionale	2–1	0–1
Manchester United (England)	5–4	(Scotland) Dundee United	2–2	3–2
Anderlecht (Belgium)	4–6	(Spain) Real Madrid	3–0	1–6
Tottenham Hotspur (England)	3–1	(Czechoslovakia) Bohemians ČKD Praha	2–0	1–1
Videoton (Hungary)	5–2	(Socialist Federal Republic of Yugoslavia) Partizan	5–0	0–2
Widzew Łódź (Poland)	1–2	(Soviet Union) Dinamo Minsk	0–2	1–0

=== First leg ===
28 November 1984
13:00

Universitatea Craiova (Romania)	2–0	(Socialist Federal Republic of Yugoslavia) Željezničar
Beldeanu 19'; Cămătaru 26' (pen.)

Stadionul Central, Craiova
Attendance: 50,000
Referee: Ángel Franco Martínez (Spain)

28 November 1984
17:00

Videoton (Hungary)	5–0	(Socialist Federal Republic of Yugoslavia) Partizan
Szabó 11', 48', 49' (pen.), 74'; Májer 80'

Sóstói Stadion, Székesfehérvár
Attendance: 20,000
Referee: Siegfried Kirschen (East Germany)

28 November 1984
17:00

Widzew Łódź (Poland)	0–2	(Soviet Union) Dinamo Minsk
		Zygmantovich 38'; Rumbutis 88'

Stadion Widzewa, Łódź
Attendance: 18,000
Referee: Bob Valentine (Scotland)

28 November 1984
18:00

Spartak Moskva (Soviet Union)	1–0	(West Germany) Köln
Pozdnyakov 35'

Lenin Dinamo Stadion, Tbilisi
Attendance: 40,000
Referee: Erik Fredriksson (Sweden)

28 November 1984
20:00

Hamburg (West Germany)	2–1	(Italy) Internazionale
Bergomi 1' (o.g.); Von Heesen 85'		Rummenigge 46'

Volksparkstadion, Hamburg
Attendance: 61,418
Referee: André Daina (Switzerland)

28 November 1984
20:00

Anderlecht (Belgium)	3–0	(Spain) Real Madrid
Vandenbergh 65'; Czerniatynski 66'; Vercauteren 85' (pen.)

Stade Constant Vanden Stock, Brussels
Attendance: 41,000
Referee: Volker Roth (West Germany)

28 November 1984
20:30

Manchester United (England)	2–2	(Scotland) Dundee United
Strachan 9' (pen.); Robson 50'		Hegarty 47'; Sturrock 61'

Old Trafford, Manchester
Attendance: 48,278
Referee: Bogdan Dochev (Bulgaria)

28 November 1984
21:00

Tottenham Hotspur (England)	2–0	(Czechoslovakia) Bohemians ČKD Praha
Ondra 25' (o.g.); Stevens 80'

White Hart Lane, London
Attendance: 27,971
Referee: Jan Keizer (Netherlands)

=== Second leg ===
12 December 1984
15:15

Željezničar (Socialist Federal Republic of Yugoslavia)	4–0	(Romania) Universitatea Craiova
Škoro 32'; Samardžija 44'; Mihajlović 62'; Nikić 82'

Stadion Grbavica, Sarajevo
Attendance: 25,000
Referee: Ron Bridges (Wales)

Željezničar won 4–2 on aggregate.

12 December 1984
16:00

Bohemians ČKD Praha (Czechoslovakia)	1–1	(England) Tottenham Hotspur
Prokeš 50'		Falco 8'

Ďolíček, Prague
Attendance: 17,500
Referee: Alexis Ponnet (Belgium)

Tottenham Hotspur won 3–1 on aggregate.

12 December 1984
17:00

Partizan (Socialist Federal Republic of Yugoslavia)	2–0	(Hungary) Videoton
Živković 12'; Varga 45'

Stadion JNA, Belgrade
Attendance: 30,000
Referee: Franz Wöhrer (Austria)

Videoton won 5–2 on aggregate.

12 December 1984
18:00

Dinamo Minsk (Soviet Union)	0–1	(Poland) Widzew Łódź
		Dziekanowski 10' (pen.)

Lenin Dinamo Stadion, Tbilisi
Attendance: 10,000
Referee: Paolo Bergamo (Italy)

Dinamo Minsk won 2–1 on aggregate.

12 December 1984
20:00

Köln (West Germany)	2–0	(Soviet Union) Spartak Moskva
Bein 24'; Littbarski 75'

Müngersdorfer Stadion, Cologne
Attendance: 35,000
Referee: José Rosa dos Santos (Portugal)

Köln won 2–1 on aggregate.

12 December 1984
20:30

Internazionale (Italy)	1–0	(West Germany) Hamburg
Brady 77' (pen.)

Stadio Giuseppe Meazza, Milan
Attendance: 78,398
Referee: Keith Hackett (England)

2–2 on aggregate; Internazionale won on away goals.

12 December 1984
20:30

Dundee United (Scotland)	2–3	(England) Manchester United
Dodds 25'; Hegarty 50'		Hughes 12'; McGinnis 43' (o.g.); Mühren 75'

Tannadice Park, Dundee
Attendance: 22,500
Referee: Alain Delmer (France)

Manchester United won 5–4 on aggregate.

12 December 1984
21:00

Real Madrid (Spain)	6–1	(Belgium) Anderlecht
Sanchís 3'; Butragueño 16', 47', 52'; Valdano 29', 39'		Frimann 34'

Santiago Bernabéu, Madrid
Attendance: 95,000
Referee: Michel Vautrot (France)

Real Madrid won 6–4 on aggregate.

== Quarter-finals ==
Team 1	Agg.	Team 2	1st leg	2nd leg
Željezničar (Socialist Federal Republic of Yugoslavia)	3–1	(Soviet Union) Dinamo Minsk	2–0	1–1
Internazionale (Italy)	4–1	(West Germany) Köln	1–0	3–1
Manchester United (England)	1–1 (4–5p)	(Hungary) Videoton	1–0	0–1
Tottenham Hotspur (England)	0–1	(Spain) Real Madrid	0–1	0–0

=== First leg ===
6 March 1985
15:45

Željezničar (Socialist Federal Republic of Yugoslavia)	2–0	(Soviet Union) Dinamo Minsk
Samardžija 64'; Baždarević 86'

Stadion Grbavica, Sarajevo
Attendance: 28,000
Referee: André Daina (Switzerland)

6 March 1985
20:30

Internazionale (Italy)	1–0	(West Germany) Köln
Causio 54'

Stadio Giuseppe Meazza, Milan
Attendance: 76,800
Referee: Robert Wurtz (France)

6 March 1985
20:30

Manchester United (England)	1–0	(Hungary) Videoton
Stapleton 60'

Old Trafford, Manchester
Attendance: 35,432
Referee: Augusto Lamo Castillo (Spain)

6 March 1985
21:00

Tottenham Hotspur (England)	0–1	(Spain) Real Madrid
		Perryman 15' (o.g.)

White Hart Lane, London
Attendance: 39,914
Referee: Paolo Casarin (Italy)

=== Second leg ===
20 March 1985
17:00

Videoton (Hungary)	1–0 (a.e.t.)	(England) Manchester United
Wittmann 20'
Penalties
Szabó (penalty scored); Burcsa (penalty scored); Végh (penalty scored); Wittmann (penalty scored); Gömöri (penalty missed); Vadász (penalty scored)	5–4	(penalty scored) Whiteside; (penalty scored) Olsen; (penalty missed) Stapleton; (penalty scored) Strachan; (penalty scored) Gidman; (penalty missed) Albiston

Sóstói Stadion, Székesfehérvár
Attendance: 25,000
Referee: Erik Fredriksson (Sweden)

1–1 on aggregate; Videoton won 5–4 on penalties.

20 March 1985
18:00

Dinamo Minsk (Soviet Union)	1–1	(Socialist Federal Republic of Yugoslavia) Željezničar
Kisten 14'		Bahtić 22'

Dinamo Stadium, Minsk
Attendance: 31,500
Referee: Talat Tokat (Turkey)

Željezničar won 3–1 on aggregate.

20 March 1985
20:00

Köln (West Germany)	1–3	(Italy) Internazionale
Bein 64'		Marini 18'; Rummenigge 75', 84'

Müngersdorfer Stadion, Cologne
Attendance: 59,000
Referee: Alexis Ponnet (Belgium)

Internazionale won 4–1 on aggregate.

20 March 1985
21:00

Real Madrid (Spain)	0–0	(England) Tottenham Hotspur

Santiago Bernabéu, Madrid
Attendance: 95,000
Referee: Bruno Galler (Switzerland)

Real Madrid won 1–0 on aggregate.

== Semi-finals ==
Team 1	Agg.	Team 2	1st leg	2nd leg
Internazionale (Italy)	2–3	(Spain) Real Madrid	2–0	0–3
Videoton (Hungary)	4–3	(Socialist Federal Republic of Yugoslavia) Željezničar	3–1	1–2

=== First leg ===
10 April 1985
18:00

Videoton (Hungary)	3–1	(Socialist Federal Republic of Yugoslavia) Željezničar
Burcsa 7'; L. Disztl 18'; Vadász 82'		Škoro 21'

Sóstói Stadion, Székesfehérvár
Attendance: 30,000
Referee: Ioan Igna (Romania)

10 April 1985
19:00

Internazionale (Italy)	2–0	(Spain) Real Madrid
Brady 25' (pen.); Altobelli 57'

Stadio Giuseppe Meazza, Milan
Attendance: 75,521
Referee: Franz Wöhrer (Austria)

=== Second leg ===
24 April 1985
20:15

Željezničar (Socialist Federal Republic of Yugoslavia)	2–1	(Hungary) Videoton
Bahtić 5'; Ćurić 72'		Csuhay 87'

Stadion Grbavica, Sarajevo
Attendance: 25,000
Referee: Dieter Pauly (West Germany)

Videoton won 4–3 on aggregate.

24 April 1985
21:00

Real Madrid (Spain)	3–0	(Italy) Internazionale
Santillana 12', 42'; Míchel 57'

Santiago Bernabéu, Madrid
Attendance: 90,200
Referee: Bob Valentine (Scotland)

Real Madrid won 3–2 on aggregate.

== Final ==
=== First leg ===
8 May 1985
20:00

Videoton (Hungary)	0–3	(Spain) Real Madrid
		Míchel 31'; Santillana 77'; Valdano 89'

Sóstói Stadion, Székesfehérvár
Attendance: 35,000
Referee: Michel Vautrot (France)

=== Second leg ===
22 May 1985
21:00

Real Madrid (Spain)	0–1	(Hungary) Videoton
		Májer 86'

Santiago Bernabéu, Madrid
Attendance: 98,300
Referee: Alexis Ponnet (Belgium)

Real Madrid won 3–1 on aggregate.
