= Božidar Janković =

Božidar Janković may refer to:

- Božidar Janković (general) (1849-1920), Serbian army general and commander
- Božidar Janković (footballer) (1951-1993), Serbian Yugoslav footballer
