= Željko Rodić =

Croatian Serb footballer (1952–2016)

Personal information
- Full name: Željko Rodić
- Date of birth: 31 July 1952
- Place of birth: Vis, PR Croatia, FPR Yugoslavia
- Date of death: 2 November 2016 (aged 64)
- Place of death: Osijek, Croatia
- Position: Forward

Youth career
- 1966–1970: Željezničar Sarajevo

Senior career*
Years	Team	Apps	(Gls)
1970–1976	Željezničar Sarajevo		
1971	→ Famos Hrasnica (loan)		
1976–1977	Jedinstvo Bihać	30	(8)
1977–1980	Osijek	60	(3)
1981	Bosna Visoko	5	(0)
1981	Buffalo Stallions (indoor)		
1981–1982	Šparta Beli Manastir		

International career
1972	Yugoslavia U20	15	(0)
- * Club domestic league appearances and goals

Željko Rodić (Serbian Cyrillic: Жељко Родић; July 31, 1952 – November 2, 2016) was a Croatian Serb footballer who most notably played with Željezničar Sarajevo.

== Club career ==
Born on the island of Vis, he started his career in Sarajevo, SR Bosnia and Herzegovina in 1966 when he joined the youth team of FK Željezničar Sarajevo. Playing as the attacker, he would become senior in 1970. He spent a short 6 months loan spell with FK Famos Hrasnica in 1971, before returning to Željezničar and becoming part of the memorable generation that became Yugoslav champions in the 1971–72 season. In 1972, he was part of the Yugoslavia U-20 national team in an international tournament in Ashgabat. Yugoslavia won the tournament in which the U-20 teams of USSR, West Germany, Ukraine and Hungary were also present, and Željko Rodić got the title of the tournaments best player. Afterwards he would be part of the team in the qualifying matches for the UEFA European youth championship.

Rodić spent a total of 10 years with Željezničar before moving in 1976 to Yugoslav Second League side NK Jedinstvo Bihać. His 8 goals in 30 league appearances during the 1976–77 season called the attention of major clubs such as NK Osijek and Red Star Belgrade, however Osijek ended up being mre persistent and Rodić was back to the national top-flight after only one season, this time to play with NK Osijek. The atmosphere in the club also influenced the decision, as the enthusiasm among the players and fans was great as the club has just been promoted back to the Yugoslav First League after 20 years absence. The club changed coaches often, and this ended up affecting the club stability. The results were not good, and Rodić, because of continuous changes of training routines due to different demands from different coaches, ended up suffering from injuries. All this culminated with Osijek being relegated from the First League in 1980, and during the winter break of the 1980–81 season, Željko Rodić moved to another Second League club, NK Bosna Visoko where he finished the season.

In 1981, he opted for a new challenge by moving to the United States and joining the indoor soccer team Buffalo Stallions. The season lasted six months, however because of a knee injury Rodić returned to Yugoslavia earlier. He finished his playing career in 1982 playing with Šparta Beli Manastir.

== Post-playing career ==
After retiring he got a football coaching diploma in 1984, however beside coaching minor clubs such as NK LIO Osijek, NK Darda and NK Šparta Beli Manastir, he did not engage in a more involving coaching career. Instead he opted for a career in business, having owned a cafe in Beli Manastir since 1982. As the Croatian War of Independence started in 1991, Rodić stayed in the city that was occupied by the Republic of Serbian Krajina. After the peaceful reintegration of the territory back into Croatia in 1998, Rodić was harassed and was sued regarding his property by a group of Croats, and the lawsuits had protracted to 2002.

== Honours ==
=== Club ===
Željezničar Sarajevo

- Yugoslav First League: 1971–72
