= 1983–84 Czechoslovak First League =

Czechoslovak First League
- Season: 1983–84
- Champions: Sparta Prague
- Relegated: Sklo Union Teplice; Plastika Nitra
- European Cup: Sparta Prague
- Cup Winners' Cup: Inter Bratislava
- UEFA Cup: Dukla Prague; Bohemians Prague; Dukla Banská Bystrica
- Top goalscorer: Werner Lička (20 goals)

The 1983–84 Czechoslovak First League season of the top flight Czechoslovak First League annual football tournament in Czechoslovakia from 1925 to 1993.

== Overview ==
It was contested by 16 teams. Sparta Prague prevailed as the 1984 champions. Werner Lička was the league's top scorer with 20 goals.

== Stadiums and locations ==
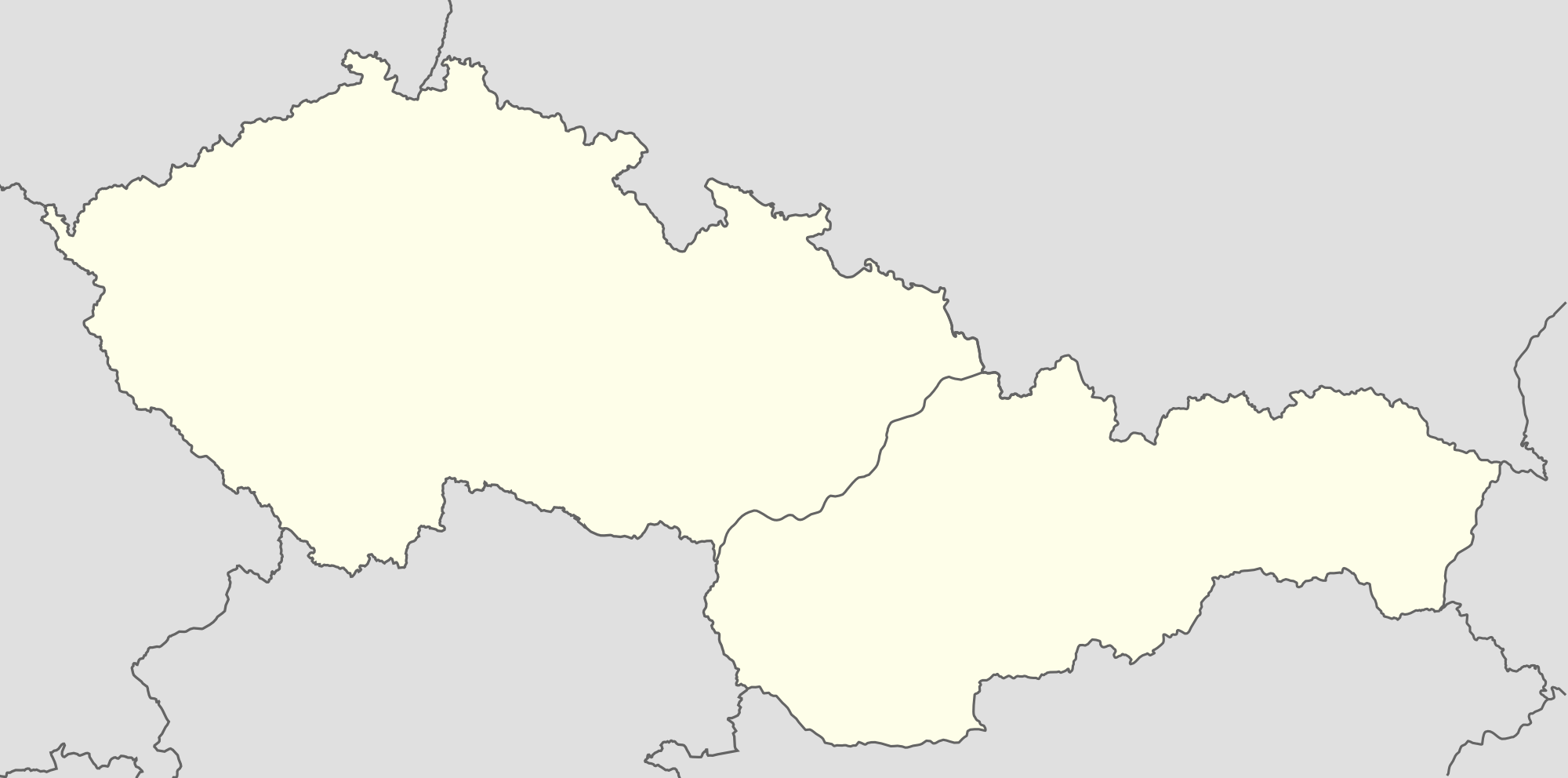
Location of clubs in the 1983–84 Czechoslovak First League

== League standings ==
Pos	Team	Pld	W	D	L	GF	GA	GD	Pts	Qualification or relegation
1	Sparta Prague (C)	30	20	6	4	58	24	+34	46	Qualification for European Cup first round
2	Dukla Prague	30	19	6	5	48	23	+25	44	Qualification for UEFA Cup first round
3	Bohemians Prague	30	16	8	6	48	26	+22	40	Qualification for UEFA Cup first round
4	Dukla Banská Bystrica	30	16	5	9	49	31	+18	37	Qualification for UEFA Cup first round
5	Baník Ostrava	30	14	7	9	45	28	+17	35	
6	Inter Bratislava	30	9	11	10	36	36	0	29	Qualification for Cup Winners' Cup first round (Note: Inter Bratislava qualified for the Cup Winners' Cup as Czechoslovak Cup runners-up.)
7	Spartak Trnava	30	11	7	12	43	50	−7	29	
8	Lokomotíva Košice	30	11	5	14	43	39	+4	27	
9	Slovan Bratislava	30	8	11	11	45	46	−1	27	
10	Vítkovice	30	10	7	13	36	45	−9	27	
11	RH Cheb	30	10	6	14	37	43	−6	26	
12	Slavia Prague	30	11	4	15	40	57	−17	26	
13	ZVL Žilina	30	9	7	14	26	43	−17	25	
14	Tatran Prešov	30	8	7	15	25	44	−19	23	
15	Sklo Union Teplice (R)	30	5	10	15	29	51	−22	20	Relegation to Czech National Football League
16	Plastika Nitra (R)	30	6	7	17	31	53	−22	19	Relegation to Slovak National Football League

Source: rsssf.com
(C) Champions; (R) Relegated

== Results ==
Home \ Away	OST	BOH	BB	DUK	INT	LOK	NIT	CHE	TEP	SLA	SPA	SLO	TRN	PRE	VÍT	ŽIL
Baník Ostrava		1–0	2–0	1–2	2–0	2–1	2–0	1–0	2–0	4–0	0–2	1–1	6–0	3–0	1–0	3–0
Bohemians Prague	3–3		3–0	1–4	1–1	3–0	2–2	1–0	2–1	5–0	1–0	1–0	2–0	3–1	1–0	4–0
Dukla Banská Bystrica	0–0	1–1		1–0	2–0	1–0	4–0	2–1	2–1	2–1	2–1	3–0	4–0	3–1	2–0	4–0
Dukla Prague	2–0	1–3	1–0		2–1	1–0	2–0	4–1	2–0	3–0	3–1	1–1	3–1	3–1	2–0	2–1
Inter Bratislava	0–0	2–0	2–0	1–1		1–0	3–0	2–0	2–0	0–1	1–2	1–0	0–0	2–1	1–1	3–1
Lokomotiva Košice	3–1	1–1	0–0	0–1	1–0		3–1	3–1	8–0	4–2	0–4	3–0	1–0	4–1	4–0	1–0
Plastika Nitra	3–2	0–1	1–4	2–0	1–1	1–0		0–1	1–1	0–1	1–3	1–1	2–2	3–1	2–0	2–0
RH Cheb	3–1	2–3	2–2	2–0	1–1	1–0	1–0		0–0	3–0	1–1	3–4	1–2	2–0	0–0	2–0
Sklo Union Teplice	0–0	0–0	1–2	0–1	2–2	3–0	2–0	1–1		3–1	1–1	1–0	4–1	0–0	1–6	2–3
Slavia Prague	2–1	1–2	1–0	1–0	3–1	4–2	4–1	3–0	4–2		0–1	1–1	4–2	2–2	0–2	1–1
Sparta Prague	3–1	1–0	3–1	1–1	3–1	1–1	2–1	4–1	2–0	2–0		2–0	3–2	3–0	4–0	0–0
Slovan Bratislava	1–1	0–0	3–2	1–1	4–4	3–1	3–3	3–2	2–2	5–0	2–0		0–1	1–2	3–3	2–0
Spartak Trnava	1–3	1–1	3–2	0–0	3–1	4–1	3–1	1–0	4–1	4–1	0–2	2–1		2–0	2–2	1–1
Tatran Prešov	0–1	1–0	0–1	1–2	1–1	0–0	0–0	1–0	0–0	2–1	1–1	2–1	2–1		2–0	1–0
Vítkovice	1–0	1–3	1–1	1–3	0–0	1–0	3–2	2–3	1–0	2–1	1–2	2–0	0–0	2–0		4–3
ZVL Žilina	0–0	1–0	2–1	0–0	3–1	1–1	1–0	1–2	1–0	0–0	1–3	0–2	1–0	2–1	2–0	

Source: statistiky1ligy.fotbal.cz
Legend: Blue = home team win; Yellow = draw; Red = away team win.

== Attendances ==
#	Club	Average	Highest
1	Sparta Praha	15,106	31,412
2	Bohemians	7,348	15,322
3	Spartak Trnava	6,573	13,161
4	Dukla Banská Bystrica	6,174	12,000
5	Slavia Praha	5,793	12,589
6	Slovan	5,444	11,187
7	Teplice	5,338	15,105
8	Ostrava	4,996	8,095
9	Žilina	4,674	12,242
10	Cheb	4,564	6,782
11	Nitra	4,461	8,053
12	Košice	4,043	15,000
13	Vítkovice	4,014	9,505
14	Tatran Prešov	2,885	4,053
15	Dukla Praha	2,814	9,018
16	Inter Bratislava	2,331	11,517
