= 1983 Danish 1st Division =

38th season of Danish 1st Division

Danish 1st Division
- Season: 1983

The 1983 Danish 1st Division season was the 38th season of the Danish 1st Division league championship, governed by the Danish Football Association. It constituted the 70th edition of the Danish football championship, and saw Lyngby Boldklub win their first championship title.

The Danish champions qualified for the European Cup 1984-85 qualification, while the second and third placed teams qualified for the qualification round of the UEFA Cup 1984-85. The three lowest placed teams of the tournament were directly relegated to the Danish 2nd Division for the following season. Likewise, the Danish 2nd Division champions and two first runners-up were promoted to the 1st Division.

== Table ==
Pos	Team	Pld	W	D	L	GF	GA	GD	Pts
1	Lyngby Boldklub	30	17	6	7	63	33	+30	40
2	Odense Boldklub	30	16	6	8	47	41	+6	38
3	Aarhus Gymnastikforening	30	16	4	10	55	39	+16	36
4	Brøndby IF	30	14	7	9	46	33	+13	35
5	Boldklubben Frem	30	10	13	7	50	38	+12	33
6	Ikast FS	30	13	7	10	40	41	−1	33
7	Næstved IF	30	12	7	11	48	45	+3	31
8	Vejle BK	30	11	8	11	49	40	+9	30
9	Esbjerg fB	30	9	12	9	40	35	+5	30
10	Køge BK	30	9	10	11	37	43	−6	28
11	Hvidovre IF	30	10	8	12	27	43	−16	28
12	Brønshøj BK	30	7	13	10	30	38	−8	27
13	Herning Fremad	30	8	10	12	23	40	−17	26
14	B 1903	30	6	13	11	27	40	−13	25
15	B 93	30	8	8	14	27	41	−14	24
16	Kolding IF	30	5	6	19	24	43	−19	16

== Results ==
Home \ Away	AGF	B93	B03	BIF	BBK	EfB	BKF	HFR	HIF	IFS	KIF	KBK	LBK	NIF	OB	VBK
Aarhus GF	—	3–1	2–2	2–1	3–1	4–1	0–0	2–0	3–0	4–3	3–0	0–1	1–0	1–0	0–2	5–2
B.93	0–3	—	1–1	0–1	2–1	2–1	3–1	1–0	0–0	0–1	2–0	3–0	0–3	1–1	1–3	4–1
B 1903	1–1	2–1	—	0–3	0–0	0–2	0–0	0–3	2–0	2–1	1–1	0–0	2–4	1–2	0–1	0–2
Brøndby IF	1–0	2–0	0–2	—	4–1	0–2	1–1	0–1	1–0	1–1	3–1	0–0	3–3	0–2	3–1	0–1
Brønshøj BK	2–0	0–0	0–0	1–0	—	3–1	2–2	1–1	0–1	3–1	1–1	2–0	0–1	1–1	1–1	1–1
Esbjerg fB	3–1	0–0	1–1	3–1	3–1	—	0–3	1–1	0–1	0–1	1–0	5–0	0–0	4–0	1–2	1–1
BK Frem	1–0	1–1	1–1	1–3	1–1	2–2	—	0–0	4–0	1–1	4–1	2–2	1–1	1–1	5–0	5–2
Herning Fremad	1–4	1–0	2–0	2–2	1–0	0–0	0–2	—	1–1	0–0	1–3	0–1	1–0	3–1	1–1	0–7
Hvidovre IF	2–0	1–0	2–3	1–1	1–1	1–1	3–2	1–0	—	0–1	1–0	0–1	0–5	2–0	2–2	1–0
Ikast FS	1–2	1–0	2–0	0–2	0–3	2–2	3–0	1–1	4–1	—	2–1	2–1	1–1	3–2	0–1	1–1
Kolding IF	1–1	0–0	1–2	1–2	2–0	1–0	1–0	0–1	1–3	0–1	—	1–1	2–2	1–2	0–2	1–2
Køge BK	1–2	0–0	1–1	2–1	0–1	2–3	5–2	0–0	1–1	1–2	2–1	—	3–2	5–1	1–2	1–0
Lyngby BK	6–5	3–0	2–1	1–2	4–0	3–0	0–2	3–0	2–0	2–1	1–0	3–3	—	2–1	5–1	2–0
Næstved IF	0–2	6–0	3–1	1–5	1–1	1–1	1–3	3–1	5–1	3–0	1–0	0–0	2–1	—	3–0	3–1
Odense BK	3–1	1–3	1–1	0–1	4–0	1–1	2–0	2–0	0–0	5–1	1–0	3–2	0–1	1–0	—	1–5
Vejle BK	2–0	3–1	0–0	2–2	1–1	0–0	1–2	3–0	2–0	1–2	0–2	3–0	1–0	1–1	2–3	—

Legend: Blue = home team win; Yellow = draw; Red = away team win.

== Top goalscorers ==
Position	Player	Club	Goals
1	Vilhelm Munk Nielsen	Odense BK	20
