= Pašo Bećirbašić =

Bosnian footballer (1945–2016)

Pašo Bećirbašić Пашо Бећирбашић
Personal information
- Full name: Pašo Bećirbašić
- Date of birth: 29 July 1945
- Place of birth: Banja Luka, Bosnia and Herzegovina, Yugoslavia
- Date of death: 11 March 2016 (aged 70)
- Place of death: Amsterdam, Netherlands
- Position: Center forward

Senior career*
Years	Team	Apps	(Gls)
1963–1965	Naprijed		
1965–1967	Borac Banja Luka		
1967–1968	BSK Banja Luka		
1968–1969	Orijent		
1969–1973	Borac Banja Luka		
1973–1974	Angoulême Charente	16	(7)
1974–1980	Paris Saint-Germain		
1980–1983	Forward-Morges		
- * Club domestic league appearances and goals

Pašo Bećirbašić (Serbian Cyrillic: Пашо Бећирбашић; 29 July 1945 – 11 March 2016) was a Bosnian football player and manager. He played as a center forward for Borac Banja Luka in his native Yugoslavia throughout the late 1960s and early 1970s as well as playing for Angoulême Charente and Paris Saint-Germain throughout the latter half of the decade.

== Career as a player ==
Growing up in Banja Luka, city district Mejdan (modern day Obilićevo), he was already skilled in handball, table tennis and athletics. Despite this, at the age of 17, he became a first-team player of Naprijed, and after the match against Kozara Gradiška where he scored five goals in a row, he received an invitation to move to Borac Banja Luka. At the beginning of 1965, he played his first season in the club and would remain there until 1973 following brief tenures with BSK Banja Luka and Orijent. He was the top scorer for the club in the 1966–67, 1970–71 and the 1971–72 seasons. Throughout this era, he was known for contributing the club winning the decisive match against Borac Čačak to win the 1969–70 Yugoslav Second League and successfully achieve promotion. From 1973 he played for French clubs Angoulême Charente and Paris Saint-Germain. From 1980 to 1983, he played for Swiss club Forward-Morges before retiring.

== Later life and death ==
After finishing his playing career, he was a manager for his old club, Naprijed, during a highly competitive era for the club with his managerial era being described as the best in the club's history. After moving to the Netherlands, he coached a local club that played futsal.

He died in Amsterdam on 11 March 2016.
