= Zoran Samardžija =

Bosnian footballer and agent (born 1962)

Personal information
- Date of birth: 6 December 1962 (age 63)
- Place of birth: Sarajevo, FPR Yugoslavia
- Height: 1.85 m (6 ft 1 in)
- Position: Left winger

Youth career
- Željezničar

Senior career*
Years	Team	Apps	(Gls)
1979–1986	Željezničar	97	(26)
1986–1988	Rouen	30	(7)
1988–1989	Eendracht Aalst	25	(11)
1989–1992	Aris Limassol	50	(27)
Total		202	(71)
- * Club domestic league appearances and goals

Zoran Samardžija (born 6 December 1962) is a Bosnian former professional footballer and FIFA players agent.

== Club career ==
Samardžija started playing in the youth teams of hometown club Željezničar. Than made his senior debut in the 1979–80 season, under the guidance of club's manager Ivica Osim. With Željezničar he had reached the semi-finals of the 1984–85 UEFA Cup. He scored crucial goals against Universitatea Craiova in the fourth round and against USSR side Dinamo Minsk in the quarter-finals.

Later he moved to France to play for FC Rouen and stayed there till 1988. In June he moved to Belgium side Eendracht Aalst and stayed there for one season. He then moved to Cypriot side Aris Limassol where he played for three seasons and finished his career in 1995 at Namur fc Belgium at the age of 33
