= Josip Bukal =

Bosnian footballer (1945–2016)

Personal information
- Date of birth: 15 November 1945
- Place of birth: Okešinec, SFR Yugoslavia
- Date of death: 30 August 2016 (aged 70)
- Place of death: Sarajevo, Bosnia and Herzegovina
- Position: Striker

Youth career
- 1960–1964: Željezničar

Senior career*
Years	Team	Apps	(Gls)
1964–1973	Željezničar	237	(106)
1973–1976	Standard Liège	60	(34)
1976–1977	Željezničar	21	(5)
Total		318	(145)

International career
1966–1974	Yugoslavia	24	(10)

Managerial career
- 1988: Željezničar
- * Club domestic league appearances and goals

Josip "Mane" Bukal (15 November 1945 – 30 August 2016) was a Yugoslav and Bosnian professional football player and later on football manager. During his playing days, he played as a striker.

== Early life ==
Bukal was born in the village of Okešinec near Ivanić-Grad where he started his primary education, before moving to Veliki Crljeni in Serbia for the fifth, sixth, and seventh grade. He moved to Sarajevo at the age of 15.

== Club career ==
Bukal's involvement with football began with the youth team of local club Željezničar. He scored 10 goals in one game for the youth team before he made his debut for the first team in 1963. He played 290 official matches with Željezničar and scored 127 goals. Bukal is the joint highest goalscorer in the history of the club, alongside Dželaludin Muharemović. He was a member of the Željezničar team that won the Yugoslav championship in the 1971–72 season.

In 1973, Bukal moved to Belgium to play for Standard Liège. There he played there for three seasons, where he was the third highest goalscorer during the 1973–74 UEFA Cup season with 7 goals. He returned to Yugoslavia and, after one more season with Željezničar, retired in 1977. He was best known for his powerful shot. During a game in Belgium, the ball was "clocked" at 142 kilometres per hour (88 mph) after his shot.

== International career ==
Bukal played for the junior and Under-21 team before he made his senior debut for Yugoslavia in an October 1966 friendly match against Israel in which he immediately scored a brace. He had collected 24 caps and scored 10 goals in the blue national jersey. His final international was a May 1974 friendly match against Hungary.

== Managerial career ==
After retirement, Bukal was employed by Željezničar as a coach, later on becoming a manager. He first worked with the youth squads, but was also an assistant manager to Blagoje Bratić in the 1987–88 season. During the beginning of the 1988–89 Yugoslav First League season, Bukal was the manager of the first team after Bratić left the club with the end of the previous season.

== Death ==
Bukal died on 30 August 2016, at the age of 70 in Sarajevo, Bosnia and Herzegovina. He was survived by his wife and children.

== Honours ==
Željezničar

- Yugoslav First League: 1971–72
