= Antonio Casado =

Spanish footballer

Personal information
- Full name: Antonio Casado Ruiz
- Date of birth: 20 March 1961 (age 65)
- Place of birth: Huelva, Spain
- Height: 1.81 m (5 ft 11 in)
- Position: Midfielder

Youth career
- Betis

Senior career*
Years	Team	Apps	(Gls)
1979–1981	Betis B		
1981–1987	Betis	120	(4)
1987–1990	Recreativo	49	(0)
1990–1991	Sant Andreu	26	(0)
1991–1998	Écija	171	(1)
1998–1999	Dos Hermanas		
Total		366	(5)
- * Club domestic league appearances and goals

Antonio Casado Ruiz (born 20 March 1961) is a Spanish retired footballer who played as a midfielder.

He spent seven seasons in La Liga, all with Betis.

== Club career ==
Born in Huelva, Andalusia, Casado made his professional debut with Real Betis in 1981, playing five La Liga games in his first season and scoring in a 2–1 away win against RCD Español. In the following four top-flight campaigns he was an important first-team member, never appearing in less than 20 matches and adding three UEFA Cup appearances during his stint with the club.

In the summer of 1987, after featuring rarely for the Verdiblancos in his last two seasons, Casado joined neighbours Recreativo de Huelva of the second division, playing four years with the team and being relegated in his third. He also spent two seasons in that level with Écija Balompié (seven overall), suffering another relegation in 1997.

Casado retired in June 1999 at the age of 38, after a one-year spell with amateurs Dos Hermanas CF.
