= Božidar Janković (footballer) =

Yugoslav footballer (1951–1993)

Personal information
- Date of birth: 22 May 1951
- Place of birth: Sarajevo, FPR Yugoslavia
- Date of death: 1 October 1993 (aged 42)
- Place of death: Kotor, FR Yugoslavia
- Position: Forward

Youth career
- –1968: Željezničar

Senior career*
Years	Team	Apps	(Gls)
1968–1979	Željezničar	256	(96)
1979–1981	Middlesbrough	50	(16)
1981–1982	Metz	19	(3)
1982–1983	Željezničar	9	(1)
Total		334	(116)

International career
1971	Yugoslavia U23	1	(1)
1972	Yugoslavia	2	(0)
- * Club domestic league appearances and goals

Božidar Janković (Serbian Cyrillic: Божидар Јанковић; 22 May 1951 – 1 October 1993), also known as Božo Janković and Boško Janković, was a professional footballer from Yugoslavia.

== Club career ==
=== Željezničar ===
Born in Sarajevo, Janković grew up in the Grbavica area, passing through every youth level at the local club Željezničar. He signed his first professional contract at the age of 17, before making his Yugoslav First League debut during the 1968–69 season. He and would go on to score 96 goals in 256 league matches, across eleven seasons.

In the 1970–71 season, Željezničar were runners-up in the league as Janković was joint top scorer with Petar Nadoveza. Particularly notable during this season was Janković's performance in an away league match against Red Star Belgrade at the Marakana when he scored 4 goals - the game ended 4–1 for Željezničar. Red Star Belgrade manager Miljan Miljanić was ready to pay 150 million Yugoslav dinars at any time when asked about signing him for the club.

In the 1971–72 season, Janković was Željezničar's second top scorer with 13 goals, behind Josip Bukal, as the club secured their first and only Yugoslav First League title. The league went down to the final game of the season as the club still needed a point to secure the title over Red Star Belgrade, however a Janković hat-trick against Partizan secured victory. In that same season, Željezničar enjoyed one of their most successful seasons in Europe with a UEFA Cup run, getting passed Club Brugge, Bologna and St Johnstone before losing in the quarter-finals to Ferencváros.

Željezničar faced Derby County in the 1972–73 European Cup first round, however lost 4–1 on aggregate, with Janković receiving a red card in the final minutes of the second leg. After relegation from the Yugoslav First Division in the 1976–77 season, Željezničar were promoted at the first opportunity, winning the Yugoslav Second League the following season.

=== Middlesbrough ===
At the age of 28, Janković received permission to leave Yugoslavia to play football abroad in line with the rules of the state, having completed compulsory military service. Middlesbrough manager John Neal had sent assistant-boss Harold Shepherdson to access him before he came for a trial. In February 1979, Janković signed for Middlesbrough in the English First Division for a reported sum of £110,000, becoming their first ever foreign player following a change in English transfer regulations. He made his first appearance off the bench away to Bristol City in March, scoring his first goal in his third start away to Derby County in a 3–0 victory. The fans would sing his first name to the tune of Ottawan’s chart single D.I.S.C.O. released that year.

Janković's second season, 1979–80, was his best finish with Middlesbrough as the club finished 9th.

In the summer of 1980, he was part of the side that won the Kirin Cup beating Japan, Argentinos Juniors, China and Espanyol along the way. The 1980–81 season that followed saw him finish as Middlesbrough's top scorer with 12 goals. Janković is regarded as a cult hero amongst Aston Villa fans having scored two against Ipswich Town at the end of the season, aiding them to win the title. As a result of this, they also qualified for the European Cup which they would go on to win the following season. At the end of that season, he turned down a new contract in order to pursue a career in law, having qualified as a lawyer prior to arriving at the club.

=== Metz ===
Janković later reversed this decision but instead signed with Metz, despite attempts by Chelsea to sign him. He scored 3 goals in 21 matches in all competitions that season, which came against Paris Saint-Germain, Bastia and Tours.

== International career ==
Janković made a youth appearance for the under 23 side in 1971, versus East Germany where he scored the games only goal.

He made his debut for Yugoslavia on 29 April 1972 in a 0–0 European Championship qualification match against the Soviet Union having been selected by manager Vujadin Boškov. His second international appearance came the next month, again against the Soviet Union, however this time his side lost 3–0.

== Personal life ==
Janković wrote a thesis on the literature of Ivo Andrić. In 1983 after retiring, he was eventually able to practice law in Sarajevo and Dubrovnik, whilst he also became a board member of Željezničar.

In 1992, Janković left Sarajevo with his wife Zdenka and son Boriša after the outbreak of the Bosnian War. In 1993, it is believed he died of cancer in Kotor, at the age of 42.

== Honours ==
Željezničar

- Yugoslav First League: 1971–72
- Yugoslav Second League: 1977–78

Middlesbrough

- Kirin Cup: 1980

Individual

- Yugoslav First League top scorer: 1970–71
