= Ilijas Pašić =

Yugoslav footballer and manager

Personal information
- Date of birth: 10 May 1934
- Place of birth: Herceg Novi, Yugoslavia
- Date of death: 2 February 2015 (aged 80)
- Place of death: Gossau, Switzerland
- Positions: Forward; left winger

Youth career
- FK Romanija

Senior career*
Years	Team	Apps	(Gls)
1952–1958	Željezničar	141	(92)
1958–1963	Dinamo Zagreb	36	(4)
Total		177	(96)

International career
1954–1959	Yugoslavia	8	(1)

Managerial career
- 1968–1970: SC Brühl
- 1970–1971: Rijeka
- 1972–1973: BSK Slavonski Brod
- 1973–1974: FC Gossau
- 1974–1975: FC Luzern
- 1978–1989: FC Gossau
- 1990–1991: FC Altstätten SG
- * Club domestic league appearances and goals

Ilijas Pašić (10 May 1934 – 2 February 2015) was a Yugoslav football player and manager.

== Playing career ==
=== Club ===
He started playing football at FK Romanija at Pale, a small club based on the outskirts of Sarajevo. At the age of 18 he made a move to the city's giants Željezničar. He played more than 250 games for the club as a left winger (including 174 across all competitions) and scored almost 200 goals (104 in competitive matches). That makes him one of the best goalscorers in history of the club.

He made a move to Dinamo Zagreb in 1959 for whom he played 95 games, scoring 31 goals over a period of three seasons, until 1962. However, his career was hampered by a serious injury. He later played in Austria and Switzerland.

=== International ===
In 1954 he made his debut for the Yugoslavia national team, as the first ever Željezničar player earn a full international cap. He had a total of eight appearances for the national team, and scored one goal, on his debut. He was a part of the Yugoslavia squad at the 1958 FIFA World Cup in Sweden.

He was also a member of Under-21 national team and B national team (18 games, 12 goals). His final international was a December 1959 friendly match against West Germany.

== Managerial career ==
He worked as a coach in Switzerland. He was a head coach in NK Rijeka and BSK Slavonski Brod, before he returned to Switzerland once more.

== Career statistics ==
=== As a player ===
Club performance			League		Cup		League Cup		Continental		Total	
Season	Club	League	Apps	Goals	Apps	Goals	Apps	Goals	Apps	Goals	Apps	Goals
Yugoslavia			League		Yugoslav Cup		League Cup		Europe		Total	
1952	Željezničar Sarajevo	Yugoslav Third League	2	0	-	-	–	–	-	-	2	0
1952-53	Željezničar Sarajevo	Yugoslav Second League	17	13	0	0	–	–	-	-	11	4
1953-54	Željezničar Sarajevo	Yugoslav Second League	31	5	4	2	–	–	-	-	36	7
1954-55	Željezničar Sarajevo	Yugoslav First League	20	13	-	-	–	–	-	-	20	13
1955-56	Željezničar Sarajevo	Yugoslav First League	25	4	1	0	–	–	4	0	34	7
1956-57	Željezničar Sarajevo	Yugoslav Second League	25	17	-	-	–	–	-	-	25	17
1957-58	Željezničar Sarajevo	Yugoslav Second League	24	10	1	0	–	–	-	-	25	10
1958-59	Željezničar Sarajevo	Yugoslav Second League	19	6	2	1	–	–	-	-	21	7
1959-60	Dinamo Zagreb	Yugoslav Second League	11	0	3	2	–	–	0	0	14	2
1960-61	Dinamo Zagreb	Yugoslav Second League	8	2	1	0	–	–	3	1	12	2
1961-62	Dinamo Zagreb	Yugoslav Second League	0	0	-	-	–	–	4	1	4	1
1962-63	Dinamo Zagreb	Yugoslav Second League	17	2	4	2	–	–	6	3	27	7
Total	Dinamo Zagreb	Yugoslav Second League	199	72	15	7	0	0	18	5	232	84

=== Managerial statistics ===
Team	From	To	Record				
Team	From	To	G	W	D	L	Win %
NK Rijeka	June, 1970	July, 1971	32	22	5	5	68.75

== Honours ==
Željezničar Sarajevo

- Yugoslav Second League (Zone II): 1956–57

Dinamo Zagreb

- Yugoslav Cup: 1959–60, 1962–63

NK Rijeka

- Yugoslav Second League: 1970-71
