= Blagoje Bratić =

Yugoslav footballer (1946–2008)

Personal information
- Full name: Blagoje Bratić
- Date of birth: March 1, 1946
- Place of birth: Sarajevo, PR Bosnia and Herzegovina, FPR Yugoslavia
- Date of death: July 31, 2008 (aged 62)
- Place of death: Toronto, Ontario, Canada
- Position: Defender

Youth career
- Pretis Vogošća
- Željezničar

Senior career*
Years	Team	Apps	(Gls)
1964–1976	Željezničar	301	(29)

International career
1972	Yugoslavia	3	(0)

Managerial career
- Lokomotiva Brčko
- Elektrobosna Jajce
- GOŠK Dubrovnik
- Famos Hrasnica
- Iskra Bugojno
- 1987–1988: Željezničar
- * Club domestic league appearances and goals

Blagoje "Blažo" Bratić (March 1, 1946 – July 31, 2008) was a professional footballer and manager.

== Playing career ==
=== Club ===
Born in Sarajevo, he started playing football in Pretis Vogošća (later known as UNIS, and today as FK Vogošća) at the age of 14. As a talented youngster, he moved to Željezničar where he would become one of the more notable Yugoslav defenders at the time. He made his debut for Željo's first team in 1964, and was a standout member of the club's greatest generation that won its only Yugoslav First League title in 1972. He played 343 official competitive games for FK Željezničar, more than anyone in the club's 86-year-old history. He scored a total of 32 goals for the club in all competitions.

=== International ===
Bratić made his debut for Yugoslavia in a June 1972 friendly match against Venezuela. He earned a total of 3 caps, scoring no goals. His final international was a week later at the same tournament in Brazil against Paraguay.

He decided to end his playing career in 1976, at the age of 30.

== Managerial career ==
He stayed in football, however, as the head coach of lower division sides such as Lokomotiva Brčko, Famos Hrasnica, GOŠK Dubrovnik, and Iskra Bugojno, before finally getting a chance to lead a top-division team with FK Željezničar in the first part of 1987/88 season. In the early 1990s he coached in Penang, Malaysia.

In 1994, Bratić and his family fled to Toronto to escape the Bosnian War. For some time, he worked as the sports director and coach of the Toronto Metro Lions.

== Personal life ==
Bratić was married to Miza with whom he had two sons, named Denis and Saša.

=== Death ===
Bratić died on July 31, 2008, at the age of 62. He is interred in Toronto's Mount Pleasant Cemetery.

== Honours ==
=== Player ===
Željezničar

- Yugoslav First League: 1971–72
