= Edin Bahtić =

Yugoslav footballer (born 1956)

Personal information
- Date of birth: 1 May 1956 (age 70)
- Place of birth: Sarajevo, FPR Yugoslavia
- Position: Midfielder

Youth career
- –1977: Željezničar

Senior career*
Years	Team	Apps	(Gls)
1977–1978	Bosna Sarajevo		
1978–1985	Željezničar	172	(53)
1985–1987	Aris	50	(6)
1987–1989	Željezničar	30	(7)

International career
1984–1985	Yugoslavia	2	(0)
- * Club domestic league appearances and goals

Edin "Fićo" Bahtić (born 1 May 1956) is a Bosnian retired professional footballer who played as a midfielder.

He was nicknamed after the famous Yugoslav car Zastava 750 colloquially known as Fićo (replica of Fiat 500).

== Club career ==
Born in Sarajevo, Bahtić started playing football for hometown club Željezničar's youth team. At the time he was supposed to leave the youth squad, he was considered not to be a quality for Željezničar's first team. He left the club and played in amateur side FK Vraca in Sarajevo. He also played one season for Bosna Sarajevo before he was called to re-join FK Željezničar in 1978. He played almost 250 league games for the club until 1989. He also scored more than 60 league goals, despite he was not actually a striker. He usually played as a right winger. During the 1985–86 and 1986–87 seasons he played for Greek side Aris.

He was also a joint top-scorer of 1984–85 UEFA Cup with seven goals alongside Queens Park Rangers' Gary Bannister. FK Željezničar reached the semifinals of UEFA Cup that season.

== International career ==
Good games in FK Željezničar shirt were the reason he was called to play for Yugoslavia national team. He made his debut for them in a September 1984 friendly match away against Scotland and earned a total of two caps. His final international was a June 1985 FIFA World Cup qualification match against Bulgaria.
