= 1971–72 Yugoslav First League =

Yugoslav First League
- Season: 1971–72
- Dates: 22 August 1971 – 11 June 1972
- Champions: Željezničar Sarajevo
- Relegated: Radnički Kragujevac; Maribor
- Top goalscorer: Slobodan Santrač (33)

The 1971–72 Yugoslav First League season was the 26th season of the First Federal League of Yugoslavia (Serbo-Croatian: Prva savezna liga Jugoslavije), the top level association football competition of SFR Yugoslavia, since its establishment in 1946. A total of 18 teams competed in the league, with the previous season's runners-up Željezničar Sarajevo winning the title.

== League table ==
Pos	Team	Pld	W	D	L	GF	GA	GD	Pts	Qualification or relegation
1	Željezničar (C)	34	21	9	4	55	20	+35	51	Qualification for European Cup first round
2	Red Star Belgrade	34	19	11	4	57	21	+36	49	Qualification for UEFA Cup first round
3	OFK Belgrade	34	17	11	6	56	26	+30	45	Qualification for UEFA Cup first round
4	Vojvodina	34	15	12	7	50	38	+12	42	Qualification for UEFA Cup first round
5	Partizan	34	15	9	10	41	35	+6	39	
6	Velež	34	14	10	10	58	32	+26	38	
7	Sloboda Tuzla	34	12	11	11	34	33	+1	35	
8	Dinamo Zagreb	34	11	10	13	47	40	+7	32	
9	Olimpija	34	13	5	16	46	51	−5	31	
10	Hajduk Split	34	12	7	15	45	56	−11	31	Qualification for Cup Winners' Cup first round
11	Vardar	34	8	14	12	31	44	−13	30	
12	Čelik	34	9	12	13	27	40	−13	30	
13	Borac Banja Luka	34	12	6	16	31	46	−15	30	
14	Radnički Niš	34	11	7	16	38	49	−11	29	
15	Sarajevo	34	10	8	16	43	46	−3	28	
16	Sutjeska Nikšić	34	9	10	15	25	39	−14	28	
17	Radnički Kragujevac (R)	34	7	10	17	24	55	−31	24	Relegation to Yugoslav Second League
18	Maribor (R)	34	3	14	17	24	61	−37	20	Relegation to Yugoslav Second League

Source: rsssf.org
Rules for classification: 1) points; 2) goal difference; 3) number of goals scored.
(C) Champions; (R) Relegated

== Results ==
Home \ Away	BOR	ČEL	DIN	HAJ	MAR	OFK	OLI	PAR	RDK	RNI	RSB	SAR	SLO	SUT	VAR	VEL	VOJ	ŽEL
Borac Banja Luka		2–0	1–0	3–1	0–0	0–2	1–0	0–1	3–1	1–0	1–0	2–1	1–0	2–0	2–1	2–1	0–0	2–3
Čelik	1–1		0–0	0–0	2–0	0–2	2–1	0–0	0–0	2–0	1–3	1–0	1–0	2–0	2–1	2–2	1–1	1–1
Dinamo Zagreb	0–0	0–1		1–0	1–0	3–0	3–0	2–0	4–1	5–2	0–1	4–1	0–0	1–1	2–2	0–2	0–0	0–2
NK Hajduk Split	2–1	1–0	1–5		2–1	0–3	1–3	2–1	3–2	4–1	2–1	3–0	0–1	2–0	1–1	3–1	2–3	1–1
Maribor	2–0	1–1	1–2	1–1		2–2	3–6	1–1	0–0	0–0	0–0	2–1	1–1	1–1	0–0	0–0	1–1	0–2
OFK Belgrade	1–1	1–0	1–1	0–0	2–1		3–0	0–0	0–0	5–0	0–0	2–1	5–1	3–0	4–0	1–0	4–0	0–0
Olimpija	5–1	1–2	1–1	1–0	3–0	1–2		3–1	1–1	3–0	1–1	1–0	2–0	2–0	1–1	1–0	2–1	1–1
Partizan	2–1	2–1	2–1	1–1	3–1	1–2	1–0		3–0	1–1	0–1	0–0	3–0	3–1	2–1	1–1	0–1	0–4
Radnički Kragujevac	1–0	1–1	2–1	0–1	1–2	0–6	2–1	1–2		2–1	0–2	3–1	0–0	2–0	0–0	2–1	1–2	0–0
Radnički Niš	5–1	2–1	3–1	3–1	4–1	0–0	2–1	0–1	0–0		1–0	1–0	0–0	2–0	5–0	1–0	1–1	0–2
Red Star	1–0	1–1	5–1	5–2	3–0	0–0	5–1	1–1	4–0	2–0		1–0	2–0	2–1	4–1	1–0	2–2	3–1
Sarajevo	3–1	2–0	2–2	1–0	3–0	1–1	4–1	0–1	4–0	2–1	2–4		4–0	0–0	3–0	0–0	1–1	1–2
Sloboda Tuzla	4–0	2–0	0–0	4–0	1–0	2–1	2–0	1–0	1–0	1–1	0–0	4–1		4–0	1–0	0–2	0–1	1–3
Sutjeska Nikšić	1–0	1–0	0–3	3–0	2–0	2–0	0–1	2–1	0–0	2–1	0–1	3–1	1–1		1–1	2–0	1–1	0–0
Vardar	0–0	0–0	2–1	1–1	1–0	3–0	1–0	0–1	2–0	1–0	1–1	0–0	0–0	1–0		2–3	1–1	0–0
Velež	3–0	7–1	1–0	4–1	6–2	3–1	6–1	1–1	3–0	2–0	0–0	1–1	0–0	0–0	5–3		3–0	0–0
Vojvodina	1–0	1–0	4–2	1–5	0–0	0–2	2–0	2–4	5–1	4–0	0–0	3–1	3–1	0–0	3–0	2–0		3–0
Željezničar	3–1	3–0	1–0	2–1	8–0	2–0	1–0	2–0	2–0	2–0	1–0	1–2	1–1	1–2	0–2	1–0	2–0	

Source: DataSoccer.it
Legend: Blue = home team win; Yellow = draw; Red = away team win.

== Winning squad ==
Champions: FK Željezničar Sarajevo
Player	League	
Player	Matches	Goals
Josip Katalinski	34	12
Slobodan Janjuš (goalkeeper)	34	0
Enver Hadžiabdić	34	0
Božo Janković	33	13
Blagoje Bratić	33	7
Velija Bećirspahić	33	1
Josip Bukal	32	14
Edin Sprečo	32	5
Branimir Jelušić	32	2
Avdija Deraković	31	1
Dragan Kojović	26	0
Fahrija Hrvat	15	0
Miloš Radović	8	0
Slobodan Kojović	6	0
Željko Rodić	4	0
Nusret Kadrić	2	0
Hajrudin Saračević	2	0
Džemaludin Šerbo	2	0
Head coach: Milan Ribar

== Top scorers ==
Rank	Player	Club	Goals
1	(Socialist Federal Republic of Yugoslavia) Slobodan Santrač	OFK Belgrade	33
2	(Socialist Federal Republic of Yugoslavia) Dušan Bajević	Velež	20
3	(Socialist Federal Republic of Yugoslavia) Nenad Cvetković	Radnički Niš	16
4	(Socialist Federal Republic of Yugoslavia) Petar Nikezić	Vojvodina	15
4	(Socialist Federal Republic of Yugoslavia) Miodrag Kustudić	Vojvodina	15
6	(Socialist Federal Republic of Yugoslavia) Josip Bukal	Željezničar	14
6	(Socialist Federal Republic of Yugoslavia) Nenad Bjeković	Partizan	14
7	(Socialist Federal Republic of Yugoslavia) Božidar Janković	Željezničar	13
7	(Socialist Federal Republic of Yugoslavia) Salem Halilhodžić	Velež	13
7	(Socialist Federal Republic of Yugoslavia) Franjo Vladić	Velež	13
7	(Socialist Federal Republic of Yugoslavia) Pašo Bećirbašić	Borac Banja Luka	13
7	(Socialist Federal Republic of Yugoslavia) Vahidin Musemić	Sarajevo	13
7	(Socialist Federal Republic of Yugoslavia) Mladen Kranjc	Maribor	13
8	(Socialist Federal Republic of Yugoslavia) Vančo Balevski	Vardar	8

== See also ==
- 1971–72 Yugoslav Second League
- 1971–72 Yugoslav Cup
