= Edin Ćurić =

Bosnian footballer (born 1962)

Personal information
- Date of birth: 22 August 1962 (age 64)
- Place of birth: Sarajevo, FPR Yugoslavia
- Position: Midfielder

Youth career
- –1980: Željezničar

Senior career*
Years	Team	Apps	(Gls)
1980–1989	Željezničar	189	(38)
1990	Las Palmas	32	(6)
1991	Željezničar	3	(0)
1992–1995	Portimonense	40	(2)
Total		264	(46)

International career
1987	Yugoslavia	1	(0)

Managerial career
- 2014–2015: Willem II U19
- 2015: Baronie
- * Club domestic league appearances and goals

Edin Ćurić (born 22 August 1962) is a Bosnian professional football manager and former player who was most recently the director of the youth school of Bosnian Premier League club Željezničar.

== Club career ==
Ćurić began his football career at hometown club Željezničar. He had played for the club's youth squads before finally making his senior debut in the 1980–81 season, under the guidance of manager Ivica Osim. Ćurić stayed at Željezničar for ten seasons, before leaving for Spanish club Las Palmas. In 1992, he moved to Portugal and spent three seasons playing for Portimonense.

== International career ==
Ćurić played one match for the Yugoslavia national team on 29 August 1987 against the Soviet Union, in which he came on as a late substitute for Dragan Stojković.

== Managerial career ==
Ćurić worked as a manager at Willem II U19 and Baronie's second team in the Netherlands. He was appointed manager of Baronie's first team in July 2015, but was sacked only five months later in December.

On 4 July 2022, Ćurić's hometown club Željezničar announced he was named as the club's new director of its youth school. He worked as director until July 2025, when he was replaced by Nenad Starovlah.
