= HNK Rijeka league record by opponent =

Croatian association football club

HNK Rijeka is a Croatian association football club based in Rijeka, which currently competes in the Croatian Football League. Founded in 1946, they have been a member of Yugoslav First League for 29 out of 45 seasons until its dissolution in 1991, including the last 17 seasons. Following the breakup of Yugoslavia, the club joined the Croatian Football League in its inaugural season in 1992, and is one of four founding members that have never been relegated.

Rijeka has competed in a number of nationally contested leagues and cup tournaments, and their record against each club faced in these competitions is listed below. Rijeka played their inaugural Yugoslav First League fixture against 14. Oktobar Niš on 25 August 1946. They have faced 41 different sides in Yugoslav First League. Rijeka have faced 73 different clubs in Yugoslav Second League and in the third tier of Yugoslav league system. In 31 Yugoslav Cup participations, Rijeka have faced 50 clubs. The club played their inaugural league fixture as part of the Croatian Football League on 29 February 1992 against Šibenik. Since 1992, they have faced 39 different sides, with their most regular opponent having been Hajduk Split and Osijek. In the Croatian Football Cup, Rijeka have faced 57 different clubs.

== Key ==
- The records include the results of matches played in the Yugoslav First League (1946–47, 1958–69 and 1974–91), Yugoslav Second League and lower tiers (1947–58 and 1969–74), Yugoslav Cup (1947–91), Croatian First Football League (1992–) and Croatian Football Cup (1992–).
- † Clubs with this background and symbol in the "Opponent" column are Rijeka's divisional rivals in the current season.
- ‡ Clubs with this background and symbol in the "Opponent" column are defunct.
- The name used for each opponent is the name they had when Rijeka most recently played a match against them. Results against each opponent include results against that club under any former name. For example, results against Dinamo Zagreb include matches played against Croatia Zagreb.
- P = matches played; W = matches won; D = matches drawn; L = matches lost; F = goals for; A = goals against; Win% = percentage of total matches won.
- The columns headed "First" and "Last" contain the first and most recent seasons in which Rijeka played a match against each opponent.

== Croatian First Football League all-time record (1992–) ==
Updated 16 October 2026.

| Opponent | P | W | D | L | F | A | P | W | D | L | F | A | P | W | D | L | F | A | Win% | First | Last | Notes | | |
| Opponent | Home | | | | | | Away | | | | | | Total | | | | | | Win% | First | Last | Notes | | |
|---|---|---|---|---|---|---|---|---|---|---|---|---|---|---|---|---|---|---|---|---|---|---|---|---|
| Belišće | 3 | 1 | 1 | 1 | 4 | 3 | | 3 | 1 | 2 | 0 | 4 | 3 | | 6 | 2 | 3 | 1 | 8 | 6 | 33.33 | 1992–93 | 1994–95 | |
| Cibalia | 29 | 17 | 8 | 4 | 56 | 19 | | 28 | 8 | 10 | 10 | 29 | 39 | | 57 | 25 | 18 | 14 | 85 | 58 | 43.86 | 1992 | 2017–18 | |
| Croatia Sesvete ‡ | 3 | 3 | 0 | 0 | 9 | 5 | | 2 | 2 | 0 | 0 | 3 | 1 | | 5 | 5 | 0 | 0 | 12 | 6 | 100.00 | 2008–09 | 2009–10 | ^{[C]} |
| Čakovec | 3 | 1 | 2 | 0 | 4 | 3 | | 3 | 1 | 0 | 2 | 1 | 3 | | 6 | 2 | 2 | 2 | 5 | 6 | 33.33 | 2000–01 | 2001–02 | |
| Dinamo Zagreb † | 52 | 14 | 18 | 20 | 67 | 79 | | 55 | 6 | 8 | 41 | 34 | 128 | | 107 | 20 | 26 | 61 | 101 | 207 | 18.69 | 1992 | 2025–26 | |
| Dubrava | 1 | 1 | 0 | 0 | 2 | 1 | | 1 | 0 | 1 | 0 | 0 | 0 | | 2 | 1 | 1 | 0 | 2 | 1 | 50.00 | 1993–94 | 1993–94 | |
| Dubrovnik ‡ | 3 | 2 | 1 | 0 | 10 | 2 | | 3 | 1 | 1 | 1 | 1 | 2 | | 6 | 3 | 2 | 1 | 11 | 4 | 50.00 | 1992 | 1993–94 | ^{[D]} |
| Gorica † | 16 | 10 | 1 | 5 | 23 | 14 | | 17 | 7 | 4 | 6 | 20 | 20 | | 33 | 17 | 5 | 11 | 43 | 34 | 51.52 | 2018–19 | 2026–27 | |
| Hajduk Split † | 56 | 24 | 14 | 18 | 74 | 52 | | 54 | 17 | 14 | 23 | 73 | 89 | | 110 | 41 | 28 | 41 | 147 | 141 | 37.27 | 1992 | 2026–27 | |
| Hrvatski Dragovoljac | 13 | 11 | 2 | 0 | 32 | 9 | | 14 | 6 | 3 | 5 | 22 | 18 | | 27 | 17 | 5 | 5 | 54 | 27 | 62.96 | 1996–97 | 2021–22 | |
| Inter Zaprešić ‡ | 28 | 17 | 7 | 4 | 57 | 21 | | 29 | 10 | 8 | 11 | 38 | 39 | | 57 | 27 | 15 | 15 | 95 | 60 | 47.37 | 1992 | 2019–20 | |
| Istra | 8 | 6 | 2 | 0 | 21 | 4 | | 9 | 2 | 1 | 6 | 6 | 9 | | 17 | 8 | 3 | 6 | 27 | 13 | 47.06 | 1992 | 1999–2000 | |
| Istra 1961 † | 35 | 23 | 9 | 3 | 73 | 25 | | 34 | 20 | 9 | 5 | 51 | 25 | | 69 | 43 | 18 | 8 | 124 | 50 | 62.32 | 2004–05 | 2026–27 | |
| Kamen Ingrad ‡ | 8 | 7 | 0 | 1 | 21 | 8 | | 7 | 3 | 0 | 4 | 6 | 8 | | 15 | 10 | 0 | 5 | 27 | 16 | 66.67 | 2001–02 | 2006–07 | ^{[E]} |
| Karlovac ‡ | 3 | 1 | 2 | 0 | 4 | 1 | | 3 | 2 | 0 | 1 | 3 | 3 | | 6 | 3 | 2 | 1 | 7 | 4 | 50.00 | 2009–10 | 2011–12 | ^{[F]} |
| Lokomotiva † | 31 | 23 | 6 | 2 | 77 | 22 | | 31 | 12 | 6 | 13 | 37 | 35 | | 62 | 35 | 12 | 15 | 114 | 57 | 56.45 | 2009–10 | 2026–27 | |
| Lučko | 1 | 1 | 0 | 0 | 1 | 0 | | 1 | 0 | 1 | 0 | 1 | 1 | | 2 | 1 | 1 | 0 | 2 | 1 | 50.00 | 2011–12 | 2011–12 | |
| Marsonia ‡ | 9 | 8 | 0 | 1 | 19 | 7 | | 7 | 2 | 1 | 4 | 7 | 9 | | 16 | 10 | 1 | 5 | 26 | 16 | 62.50 | 1994–95 | 2003–04 | ^{[G]} |
| Međimurje | 6 | 5 | 0 | 1 | 20 | 8 | | 6 | 5 | 1 | 0 | 15 | 6 | | 12 | 10 | 1 | 1 | 35 | 14 | 83.33 | 2004–05 | 2009–10 | |
| Mladost 127 ‡ | 5 | 4 | 1 | 0 | 8 | 2 | | 5 | 1 | 3 | 1 | 4 | 5 | | 10 | 5 | 4 | 1 | 12 | 7 | 50.00 | 1995–96 | 1998–99 | ^{[H]} |
| Neretva ‡ | 1 | 1 | 0 | 0 | 1 | 0 | | 1 | 0 | 1 | 0 | 0 | 0 | | 2 | 1 | 1 | 0 | 1 | 0 | 50.00 | 1994–95 | 1994–95 | ^{[Q]} |
| Orijent ‡ | 1 | 1 | 0 | 0 | 4 | 0 | | 1 | 0 | 1 | 0 | 2 | 2 | | 2 | 1 | 1 | 0 | 6 | 2 | 50.00 | 1996–97 | 1996–97 | ^{[I]} |
| Osijek † | 55 | 29 | 15 | 11 | 91 | 49 | | 55 | 12 | 15 | 28 | 50 | 76 | | 110 | 41 | 30 | 39 | 141 | 125 | 37.27 | 1992 | 2026–27 | |
| Pazinka | 2 | 2 | 0 | 0 | 5 | 1 | | 2 | 0 | 2 | 0 | 0 | 0 | | 4 | 2 | 2 | 0 | 5 | 1 | 50.00 | 1992–93 | 1993–94 | |
| Pomorac ‡ | 3 | 1 | 2 | 0 | 5 | 3 | | 3 | 1 | 1 | 1 | 2 | 2 | | 6 | 2 | 3 | 1 | 7 | 5 | 33.33 | 2001–02 | 2002–03 | ^{[J]} |
| Primorac | 2 | 0 | 2 | 0 | 0 | 0 | | 2 | 1 | 1 | 0 | 2 | 1 | | 4 | 1 | 3 | 0 | 2 | 1 | 25.00 | 1993–94 | 1994–95 | |
| Radnik ‡ | 2 | 2 | 0 | 0 | 9 | 0 | | 2 | 2 | 0 | 0 | 5 | 1 | | 4 | 4 | 0 | 0 | 14 | 1 | 100.00 | 1992–93 | 1993–94 | ^{[K]} |
| Rudeš † | 7 | 7 | 0 | 0 | 24 | 4 | | 7 | 6 | 0 | 1 | 20 | 10 | | 14 | 13 | 0 | 1 | 44 | 14 | 92.86 | 2017–18 | 2026–27 | |
| Samobor | 2 | 0 | 2 | 0 | 1 | 1 | | 2 | 0 | 0 | 2 | 1 | 5 | | 4 | 0 | 2 | 2 | 2 | 6 | 0.00 | 1997–98 | 1997–98 | |
| Segesta | 6 | 2 | 3 | 1 | 5 | 2 | | 6 | 2 | 1 | 3 | 7 | 13 | | 12 | 4 | 4 | 4 | 12 | 15 | 33.33 | 1992–93 | 1996–97 | |
| Slaven Belupo † | 48 | 29 | 13 | 6 | 87 | 37 | | 48 | 16 | 19 | 13 | 57 | 49 | | 96 | 45 | 32 | 19 | 144 | 86 | 46.88 | 1997–98 | 2026–27 | |
| RNK Split | 11 | 7 | 3 | 1 | 19 | 7 | | 12 | 6 | 2 | 4 | 19 | 14 | | 23 | 13 | 5 | 5 | 38 | 21 | 56.52 | 2010–11 | 2016–17 | |
| Šibenik | 31 | 19 | 7 | 5 | 56 | 24 | | 33 | 15 | 9 | 9 | 37 | 34 | | 64 | 34 | 16 | 14 | 92 | 58 | 53.13 | 1992 | 2024–25 | |
| TŠK Topolovac | 1 | 1 | 0 | 0 | 2 | 0 | | 1 | 1 | 0 | 0 | 3 | 2 | | 2 | 2 | 0 | 0 | 5 | 2 | 100.00 | 2001–02 | 2001–02 | |
| Varteks / Varaždin ‡ | 30 | 17 | 12 | 1 | 58 | 27 | 26 | 5 | 11 | 10 | 28 | 38 | 56 | 22 | 23 | 11 | 86 | 65 | 39.29 | 1992 | 2011–12 | ^{[R]} | | |
| Varaždin † | 12 | 8 | 2 | 2 | 23 | 12 | 13 | 4 | 2 | 7 | 12 | 14 | 25 | 12 | 4 | 9 | 35 | 26 | 48.00 | 2019–20 | 2026–27 | | | |
| Vukovar 1991 | 2 | 2 | 0 | 0 | 6 | 1 | 2 | 1 | 0 | 1 | 3 | 3 | 4 | 3 | 0 | 1 | 9 | 4 | 75.00 | 2025–26 | 2025–26 | | | |
| Vukovar '91 ‡ | 2 | 1 | 1 | 0 | 2 | 0 | 1 | 0 | 1 | 0 | 0 | 0 | 3 | 1 | 2 | 0 | 2 | 0 | 33.33 | 1999–2000 | 1999–2000 | ^{[L]} | | |
| Zadar ‡ | 25 | 17 | 5 | 3 | 64 | 23 | 24 | 6 | 9 | 9 | 28 | 30 | 49 | 23 | 14 | 12 | 92 | 53 | 46.94 | 1992 | 2014–15 | | | |
| NK Zagreb | 30 | 18 | 5 | 7 | 51 | 26 | 29 | 9 | 7 | 13 | 36 | 47 | 59 | 27 | 12 | 20 | 87 | 73 | 45.76 | 1992 | 2015–16 | | | |

== Croatian Football Cup all-time record (1992–) ==
Updated 20 October 2026.

| Opponent | P | W | D | L | F | A | P | W | D | L | F | A | P | W | D | L | F | A | Win% | First | Last | Notes | | |
| Opponent | Home | | | | | | Away | | | | | | Total | | | | | | Win% | First | Last | Notes | | |
|---|---|---|---|---|---|---|---|---|---|---|---|---|---|---|---|---|---|---|---|---|---|---|---|---|
| Bednja | 0 | 0 | 0 | 0 | 0 | 0 | | 2 | 2 | 0 | 0 | 13 | 0 | | 2 | 2 | 0 | 0 | 13 | 0 | 100.00 | 2015–16 | 2024–25 | |
| Belišće | 1 | 1 | 0 | 0 | 4 | 1 | | 1 | 0 | 1 | 0 | 0 | 0 | | 2 | 1 | 1 | 0 | 4 | 1 | 50.00 | 1993–94 | 1993–94 | |
| Bjelovar | 1 | 1 | 0 | 0 | 4 | 0 | | 1 | 0 | 0 | 1 | 0 | 1 | | 2 | 1 | 0 | 1 | 4 | 1 | 50.00 | 1993–94 | 1993–94 | |
| BSK Bijelo Brdo | 0 | 0 | 0 | 0 | 0 | 0 | | 2 | 1 | 0 | 1 | 3 | 3 | | 2 | 1 | 0 | 1 | 3 | 3 | 50.00 | 2011–12 | 2022–23 | |
| Buje | 0 | 0 | 0 | 0 | 0 | 0 | | 1 | 1 | 0 | 0 | 11 | 0 | | 1 | 1 | 0 | 0 | 11 | 0 | 100.00 | 2019–20 | 2019–20 | |
| Budućnost Hodošan | 1 | 1 | 0 | 0 | 3 | 0 | | 1 | 1 | 0 | 0 | 3 | 2 | | 2 | 2 | 0 | 0 | 6 | 2 | 100.00 | 1993–94 | 1993–94 | |
| Cibalia | 0 | 0 | 0 | 0 | 0 | 0 | | 2 | 1 | 0 | 1 | 3 | 2 | | 2 | 1 | 0 | 1 | 3 | 2 | 50.00 | 1998–99 | 2023–24 | |
| Crikvenica | 1 | 1 | 0 | 0 | 2 | 1 | | 0 | 0 | 0 | 0 | 0 | 0 | | 1 | 1 | 0 | 0 | 2 | 1 | 100.00 | 2004–05 | 2004–05 | |
| Dilj | 0 | 0 | 0 | 0 | 0 | 0 | | 1 | 1 | 0 | 0 | 6 | 0 | | 1 | 1 | 0 | 0 | 6 | 0 | 100.00 | 2020–21 | 2020–21 | |
| Dinamo Zagreb | 9 | 5 | 1 | 3 | 9 | 7 | | 10 | 2 | 2 | 6 | 10 | 17 | | 22 | 9 | 3 | 10 | 25 | 28 | 40.91 | 1992 | 2025–26 | ^{[P]} |
| Đakovo ‡ | 0 | 0 | 0 | 0 | 0 | 0 | | 1 | 1 | 0 | 0 | 2 | 1 | | 1 | 1 | 0 | 0 | 2 | 1 | 100.00 | 2006–07 | 2006–07 | ^{[M]} |
| Đakovo Croatia | 0 | 0 | 0 | 0 | 0 | 0 | | 1 | 1 | 0 | 0 | 3 | 0 | | 1 | 1 | 0 | 0 | 3 | 0 | 100.00 | 2016–17 | 2016–17 | |
| Gorica | 0 | 0 | 0 | 0 | 0 | 0 | | 1 | 1 | 0 | 0 | 3 | 0 | | 1 | 1 | 0 | 0 | 3 | 0 | 100.00 | 2017–18 | 2017–18 | |
| GOŠK Dubrovnik | 0 | 0 | 0 | 0 | 0 | 0 | | 1 | 1 | 0 | 0 | 3 | 0 | | 1 | 1 | 0 | 0 | 3 | 0 | 100.00 | 2014–15 | 2014–15 | |
| Grafičar Vodovod | 0 | 0 | 0 | 0 | 0 | 0 | | 1 | 0 | 0 | 1 | 0 | 1 | | 1 | 0 | 0 | 1 | 0 | 1 | 0.00 | 2002–03 | 2002–03 | |
| Hajduk Split | 5 | 3 | 2 | 0 | 6 | 3 | | 6 | 2 | 3 | 1 | 10 | 9 | | 11 | 5 | 5 | 1 | 16 | 12 | 45.45 | 1992 | 2025–26 | |
| Halubjan | 0 | 0 | 0 | 0 | 0 | 0 | | 1 | 1 | 0 | 0 | 2 | 1 | | 1 | 1 | 0 | 0 | 2 | 1 | 100.00 | 1998–99 | 1998–99 | |
| Hrvatski Dragovoljac | 0 | 0 | 0 | 0 | 0 | 0 | | 3 | 0 | 2 | 1 | 1 | 2 | | 3 | 0 | 2 | 1 | 1 | 2 | 0.00 | 1996–97 | 2006–07 | |
| Inter Zaprešić ‡ | 1 | 1 | 0 | 0 | 1 | 0 | | 2 | 2 | 0 | 0 | 4 | 2 | | 3 | 3 | 0 | 0 | 5 | 2 | 100.00 | 2011–12 | 2018–19 | |
| Istra 1961 | 2 | 2 | 0 | 0 | 3 | 1 | | 2 | 1 | 0 | 1 | 3 | 3 | | 4 | 3 | 0 | 1 | 6 | 4 | 75.00 | 2013–14 | 2024–25 | |
| Jedinstvo Omladinac | 0 | 0 | 0 | 0 | 0 | 0 | | 1 | 1 | 0 | 0 | 2 | 0 | | 1 | 1 | 0 | 0 | 2 | 0 | 100.00 | 2005–06 | 2005–06 | |
| Kamen Ingrad ‡ | 1 | 1 | 0 | 0 | 2 | 0 | | 2 | 1 | 0 | 1 | 3 | 4 | | 3 | 2 | 0 | 1 | 5 | 4 | 66.67 | 2000–01 | 2003–04 | |
| Karlovac 1919 | 0 | 0 | 0 | 0 | 0 | 0 | | 1 | 1 | 0 | 0 | 4 | 1 | | 1 | 1 | 0 | 0 | 4 | 1 | 100.00 | 2026–27 | 2026–27 | |
| Konavljanin | 1 | 1 | 0 | 0 | 3 | 1 | | 1 | 0 | 0 | 1 | 1 | 2 | | 2 | 1 | 0 | 1 | 4 | 3 | 50.00 | 2006–07 | 2006–07 | |
| Križevci | 0 | 0 | 0 | 0 | 0 | 0 | | 1 | 1 | 0 | 0 | 9 | 0 | | 1 | 1 | 0 | 0 | 9 | 0 | 100.00 | 2018–19 | 2018–19 | |
| Lekenik | 0 | 0 | 0 | 0 | 0 | 0 | | 1 | 1 | 0 | 0 | 4 | 2 | | 1 | 1 | 0 | 0 | 4 | 2 | 100.00 | 2014–15 | 2014–15 | |
| Libertas Novska | 0 | 0 | 0 | 0 | 0 | 0 | | 1 | 1 | 0 | 0 | 9 | 0 | | 1 | 1 | 0 | 0 | 9 | 0 | 100.00 | 2023–24 | 2023–24 | |
| Lokomotiva | 1 | 1 | 0 | 0 | 4 | 1 | | 5 | 5 | 0 | 0 | 11 | 2 | | 7 | 7 | 0 | 0 | 16 | 3 | 100.00 | 2014–15 | 2023–24 | ^{[S]} |
| Maksimir | 0 | 0 | 0 | 0 | 0 | 0 | | 1 | 1 | 0 | 0 | 4 | 0 | | 1 | 1 | 0 | 0 | 4 | 0 | 100.00 | 2025–26 | 2025–26 | |
| Međimurje | 2 | 2 | 0 | 0 | 6 | 2 | | 0 | 0 | 0 | 0 | 0 | 0 | | 2 | 2 | 0 | 0 | 6 | 2 | 100.00 | 2005–06 | 2010–11 | |
| Metalac Sisak | 0 | 0 | 0 | 0 | 0 | 0 | | 1 | 1 | 0 | 0 | 6 | 0 | | 1 | 1 | 0 | 0 | 6 | 0 | 100.00 | 2008–09 | 2008–09 | |
| MV Croatia | 0 | 0 | 0 | 0 | 0 | 0 | | 1 | 1 | 0 | 0 | 2 | 0 | | 1 | 1 | 0 | 0 | 2 | 0 | 100.00 | 2009–10 | 2009–10 | |
| Mladost Ždralovi | 0 | 0 | 0 | 0 | 0 | 0 | | 1 | 1 | 0 | 0 | 4 | 1 | | 1 | 1 | 0 | 0 | 4 | 1 | 100.00 | 2025–26 | 2025–26 | |
| Moslavina | 0 | 0 | 0 | 0 | 0 | 0 | | 1 | 0 | 1 | 0 | 1 | 1 | | 1 | 0 | 1 | 0 | 1 | 1 | 0.00 | 2022–23 | 2022–23 | |
| Nedelišće | 0 | 0 | 0 | 0 | 0 | 0 | 1 | 0 | 0 | 1 | 0 | 1 | 1 | 0 | 0 | 1 | 0 | 1 | 0.00 | 2012–13 | 2012–13 | | | |
| Nehaj | 1 | 1 | 0 | 0 | 3 | 1 | 3 | 3 | 0 | 0 | 13 | 2 | 4 | 4 | 0 | 0 | 16 | 3 | 100.00 | 1995–96 | 2003–04 | | | |
| Neretvanac Opuzen | 0 | 0 | 0 | 0 | 0 | 0 | 1 | 1 | 0 | 0 | 3 | 1 | 1 | 1 | 0 | 0 | 3 | 1 | 100.00 | 2024–25 | 2024–25 | | | |
| Nosteria | 0 | 0 | 0 | 0 | 0 | 0 | 1 | 1 | 0 | 0 | 4 | 2 | 1 | 1 | 0 | 0 | 4 | 2 | 100.00 | 2010–11 | 2010–11 | | | |
| Olimpija | 0 | 0 | 0 | 0 | 0 | 0 | 1 | 1 | 0 | 0 | 3 | 0 | 1 | 1 | 0 | 0 | 3 | 0 | 100.00 | 1997–98 | 1997–98 | | | |
| Opatija | 0 | 0 | 0 | 0 | 0 | 0 | 1 | 1 | 0 | 0 | 3 | 0 | 1 | 1 | 0 | 0 | 3 | 0 | 100.00 | 2015–16 | 2015–16 | | | |
| Orijent ‡ | 1 | 0 | 0 | 1 | 0 | 2 | 0 | 0 | 0 | 0 | 0 | 0 | 1 | 0 | 0 | 1 | 0 | 2 | 0.00 | 1997–98 | 1997–98 | | | |
| Oriolik | 0 | 0 | 0 | 0 | 0 | 0 | 1 | 1 | 0 | 0 | 6 | 0 | 1 | 1 | 0 | 0 | 6 | 0 | 100.00 | 2021–22 | 2021–22 | | | |
| Osijek | 6 | 5 | 0 | 1 | 12 | 7 | 5 | 2 | 0 | 3 | 4 | 5 | 11 | 7 | 0 | 4 | 16 | 12 | 63.64 | 1994–95 | 2021–22 | | | |
| Pitomača | 0 | 0 | 0 | 0 | 0 | 0 | 1 | 1 | 0 | 0 | 7 | 0 | 1 | 1 | 0 | 0 | 7 | 0 | 100.00 | 2021–22 | 2021–22 | | | |
| Podravina | 0 | 0 | 0 | 0 | 0 | 0 | 1 | 1 | 0 | 0 | 3 | 1 | 1 | 1 | 0 | 0 | 3 | 1 | 100.00 | 2013–14 | 2013–14 | | | |
| Radnik ‡ | 0 | 0 | 0 | 0 | 0 | 0 | 1 | 1 | 0 | 0 | 2 | 1 | 1 | 1 | 0 | 0 | 2 | 1 | 100.00 | 1999–2000 | 1999–2000 | | | |
| Rudeš | 0 | 0 | 0 | 0 | 0 | 0 | 3 | 3 | 0 | 0 | 10 | 4 | 3 | 3 | 0 | 0 | 10 | 4 | 100.00 | 2004–05 | 2023–24 | | | |
| Segesta | 1 | 0 | 1 | 0 | 2 | 2 | 2 | 1 | 0 | 1 | 2 | 4 | 3 | 1 | 1 | 1 | 4 | 6 | 33.33 | 1992–93 | 2007–08 | | | |
| Slaven Belupo | 6 | 4 | 2 | 0 | 7 | 2 | 5 | 0 | 3 | 2 | 6 | 10 | 11 | 4 | 5 | 2 | 13 | 12 | 36.36 | 1995–96 | 2025–26 | | | |
| Sloboda Varaždin | 0 | 0 | 0 | 0 | 0 | 0 | 1 | 1 | 0 | 0 | 5 | 1 | 1 | 1 | 0 | 0 | 5 | 1 | 100.00 | 1996–97 | 1996–97 | | | |
| RNK Split | 1 | 1 | 0 | 0 | 4 | 0 | 1 | 1 | 0 | 0 | 1 | 0 | 2 | 2 | 0 | 0 | 5 | 0 | 100.00 | 1994–95 | 1994–95 | | | |
| Šibenik | 0 | 0 | 0 | 0 | 0 | 0 | 1 | 0 | 0 | 1 | 0 | 4 | 1 | 0 | 0 | 1 | 0 | 4 | 0.00 | 2009–10 | 2009–10 | | | |
| Valpovka | 1 | 1 | 0 | 0 | 2 | 0 | 1 | 1 | 0 | 0 | 2 | 0 | 2 | 2 | 0 | 0 | 4 | 0 | 100.00 | 1994–95 | 1994–95 | | | |
| Varteks / Varaždin ‡ | 4 | 3 | 0 | 1 | 10 | 6 | 4 | 1 | 0 | 3 | 5 | 11 | 8 | 4 | 0 | 4 | 15 | 17 | 50.00 | 2004–05 | 2010–11 | | | |
| Varaždin | 0 | 0 | 0 | 0 | 0 | 0 | 3 | 3 | 0 | 0 | 6 | 3 | 3 | 3 | 0 | 0 | 6 | 3 | 100.00 | 2018–19 | 2020–21 | | | |
| Vinogradar | 1 | 1 | 0 | 0 | 8 | 0 | 1 | 1 | 0 | 0 | 2 | 1 | 2 | 2 | 0 | 0 | 10 | 1 | 100.00 | 2005–06 | 2005–06 | | | |
| Vrbovec | 0 | 0 | 0 | 0 | 0 | 0 | 2 | 2 | 0 | 0 | 9 | 1 | 2 | 2 | 0 | 0 | 9 | 1 | 100.00 | 2017–18 | 2026–27 | | | |
| Vukovar '91 ‡ | 0 | 0 | 0 | 0 | 0 | 0 | 1 | 1 | 0 | 0 | 4 | 2 | 1 | 1 | 0 | 0 | 4 | 2 | 100.00 | 2001–02 | 2001–02 | | | |
| Zadar ‡ | 0 | 0 | 0 | 0 | 0 | 0 | 1 | 0 | 1 | 0 | 2 | 2 | 1 | 0 | 1 | 0 | 2 | 2 | 0.00 | 2008–09 | 2008–09 | | | |
| NK Zagreb | 3 | 1 | 1 | 1 | 5 | 4 | 2 | 0 | 1 | 1 | 2 | 7 | 5 | 1 | 2 | 2 | 7 | 11 | 20.00 | 1995–96 | 2008–09 | | | |
| Zelina | 0 | 0 | 0 | 0 | 0 | 0 | 1 | 1 | 0 | 0 | 4 | 0 | 1 | 1 | 0 | 0 | 4 | 0 | 100.00 | 2007–08 | 2007–08 | | | |
| Zmaj | 1 | 1 | 0 | 0 | 11 | 0 | 0 | 0 | 0 | 0 | 0 | 0 | 1 | 1 | 0 | 0 | 11 | 0 | 100.00 | 2013–14 | 2013–14 | | | |

== Yugoslav First League all-time record (1946–47, 1958–69 and 1974–91) ==
| Opponent | P | W | D | L | F | A | P | W | D | L | F | A | P | W | D | L | F | A | Win% | First | Last | Notes | |
| Opponent | Home | | | | | | Away | | | | | | Total | | | | | | Win% | First | Last | Notes | |
|---|---|---|---|---|---|---|---|---|---|---|---|---|---|---|---|---|---|---|---|---|---|---|---|
| 14. Oktobar ‡ | 1 | 1 | 0 | 0 | 2 | 1 | | 1 | 0 | 1 | 0 | 1 | 1 | | 2 | 1 | 1 | 0 | 3 | 2 | 50.00 | 1946–47 | 1946–47 |
| Bor | 2 | 2 | 0 | 0 | 3 | 0 | | 2 | 0 | 1 | 1 | 1 | 2 | | 4 | 2 | 1 | 1 | 4 | 2 | 50.00 | 1968–69 | 1974–75 |
| Borac | 9 | 5 | 3 | 1 | 14 | 4 | | 9 | 1 | 4 | 4 | 8 | 13 | | 18 | 6 | 7 | 5 | 22 | 17 | 33.33 | 1961–62 | 1990–91 |
| Budućnost | 20 | 12 | 7 | 1 | 28 | 7 | | 20 | 3 | 4 | 13 | 18 | 34 | | 40 | 15 | 11 | 14 | 46 | 41 | 37.50 | 1946–47 | 1990–91 |
| Crvena Lokomotiva | 1 | 0 | 0 | 1 | 0 | 5 | | 1 | 0 | 0 | 1 | 1 | 3 | | 2 | 0 | 0 | 2 | 1 | 8 | 0.00 | 1946–47 | 1946–47 |
| Čelik | 12 | 10 | 2 | 0 | 24 | 5 | | 12 | 3 | 5 | 4 | 16 | 17 | | 24 | 13 | 7 | 4 | 40 | 22 | 54.17 | 1966–67 | 1988–89 |
| Dinamo Vinkovci | 5 | 4 | 1 | 0 | 12 | 5 | | 5 | 0 | 1 | 4 | 3 | 10 | | 10 | 4 | 2 | 4 | 15 | 15 | 40.00 | 1982–83 | 1986–87 |
| Dinamo Zagreb | 29 | 14 | 10 | 5 | 40 | 25 | | 29 | 2 | 6 | 21 | 21 | 71 | | 58 | 16 | 16 | 26 | 61 | 96 | 27.59 | 1946–47 | 1990–91 |
| Hajduk Split | 29 | 9 | 16 | 4 | 40 | 27 | | 29 | 2 | 7 | 20 | 21 | 63 | | 58 | 11 | 23 | 24 | 61 | 90 | 18.97 | 1946–47 | 1990–91 |
| Iskra | 1 | 1 | 0 | 0 | 3 | 1 | | 1 | 0 | 1 | 0 | 1 | 1 | | 2 | 1 | 1 | 0 | 4 | 2 | 50.00 | 1984–85 | 1984–85 |
| Maribor | 2 | 0 | 1 | 1 | 1 | 2 | | 2 | 1 | 0 | 1 | 6 | 5 | | 4 | 1 | 1 | 2 | 7 | 7 | 25.00 | 1967–68 | 1968–69 |
| Nafta ‡ | 1 | 1 | 0 | 0 | 4 | 1 | | 1 | 1 | 0 | 0 | 3 | 0 | | 2 | 2 | 0 | 0 | 7 | 1 | 100.00 | 1946–47 | 1946–47 |
| Napredak | 5 | 4 | 1 | 0 | 9 | 3 | | 5 | 1 | 0 | 4 | 3 | 14 | | 10 | 5 | 1 | 4 | 12 | 17 | 50.00 | 1976–77 | 1988–89 |
| Novi Sad | 3 | 2 | 0 | 1 | 8 | 3 | | 3 | 0 | 3 | 0 | 2 | 2 | | 6 | 2 | 3 | 1 | 10 | 5 | 33.33 | 1961–62 | 1963–64 |
| OFK Beograd | 20 | 10 | 9 | 1 | 34 | 17 | | 20 | 4 | 7 | 9 | 20 | 39 | | 40 | 14 | 16 | 10 | 54 | 56 | 35.00 | 1946–47 | 1985–86 |
| Olimpija ‡ | 16 | 8 | 6 | 2 | 14 | 6 | | 16 | 4 | 4 | 8 | 11 | 23 | | 32 | 12 | 10 | 10 | 25 | 29 | 37.50 | 1965–66 | 1990–91 |
| Osijek | 13 | 9 | 3 | 1 | 29 | 10 | | 13 | 2 | 4 | 7 | 8 | 20 | | 26 | 11 | 7 | 8 | 37 | 30 | 42.31 | 1977–78 | 1990–91 |
| Partizan | 29 | 10 | 9 | 10 | 33 | 39 | | 29 | 3 | 6 | 20 | 14 | 43 | | 58 | 13 | 15 | 30 | 47 | 82 | 22.41 | 1946–47 | 1990–91 |
| Ponziana | 1 | 1 | 0 | 0 | 3 | 0 | | 1 | 0 | 0 | 1 | 0 | 1 | | 2 | 1 | 0 | 1 | 3 | 1 | 50.00 | 1946–47 | 1946–47 |
| Priština | 5 | 3 | 0 | 2 | 6 | 5 | | 5 | 0 | 0 | 5 | 3 | 11 | | 10 | 3 | 0 | 7 | 9 | 16 | 30.00 | 1983–84 | 1987–88 |
| Proleter ‡ | 4 | 2 | 2 | 0 | 8 | 2 | | 4 | 0 | 2 | 2 | 2 | 6 | | 8 | 2 | 4 | 2 | 10 | 8 | 25.00 | 1967–68 | 1990–91 |
| Rad | 4 | 0 | 2 | 2 | 0 | 2 | | 4 | 1 | 0 | 3 | 1 | 9 | | 8 | 1 | 2 | 5 | 1 | 11 | 12.50 | 1987–88 | 1990–91 |
| Radnički Beograd | 4 | 1 | 2 | 1 | 7 | 5 | | 4 | 3 | 1 | 0 | 8 | 4 | | 8 | 4 | 3 | 1 | 15 | 9 | 50.00 | 1958–59 | 1965–66 |
| Radnički Kragujevac | 2 | 1 | 1 | 0 | 3 | 2 | | 2 | 0 | 0 | 2 | 1 | 4 | | 4 | 1 | 1 | 2 | 4 | 6 | 25.00 | 1974–75 | 1975–76 |
| Radnički Niš | 23 | 15 | 6 | 2 | 41 | 13 | | 23 | 2 | 3 | 18 | 11 | 39 | | 46 | 17 | 9 | 20 | 52 | 52 | 36.96 | 1962–63 | 1990–91 |
| Red Star | 29 | 11 | 9 | 9 | 29 | 30 | | 29 | 3 | 4 | 22 | 22 | 67 | | 58 | 14 | 13 | 31 | 51 | 97 | 24.14 | 1946–47 | 1990–91 |
| Sarajevo | 28 | 17 | 8 | 3 | 60 | 28 | | 28 | 1 | 7 | 20 | 17 | 53 | | 56 | 18 | 15 | 23 | 77 | 81 | 32.14 | 1958–59 | 1990–91 |
| Sloboda | 19 | 12 | 5 | 2 | 29 | 7 | | 19 | 3 | 5 | 11 | 15 | 23 | | 38 | 15 | 10 | 13 | 44 | 30 | 39.47 | 1959–60 | 1990–91 |
| Spartak | 5 | 3 | 2 | 0 | 8 | 1 | | 5 | 2 | 1 | 2 | 3 | 3 | | 10 | 5 | 3 | 2 | 11 | 4 | 50.00 | 1946–47 | 1990–91 |
| RNK Split | 1 | 1 | 0 | 0 | 2 | 0 | | 1 | 1 | 0 | 0 | 2 | 1 | | 2 | 2 | 0 | 0 | 4 | 1 | 100.00 | 1960–61 | 1960–61 |
| Sutjeska | 6 | 5 | 1 | 0 | 9 | 2 | | 6 | 1 | 1 | 4 | 3 | 9 | | 12 | 6 | 2 | 4 | 12 | 11 | 50.00 | 1964–65 | 1987–88 |
| Teteks | 1 | 0 | 1 | 0 | 2 | 2 | | 1 | 0 | 0 | 1 | 1 | 2 | | 2 | 0 | 1 | 1 | 3 | 4 | 0.00 | 1981–82 | 1981–82 |
| Trepča | 1 | 1 | 0 | 0 | 3 | 0 | | 1 | 1 | 0 | 0 | 2 | 1 | | 2 | 2 | 0 | 0 | 5 | 1 | 100.00 | 1977–78 | 1977–78 |
| Trešnjevka | 3 | 3 | 0 | 0 | 11 | 3 | | 3 | 2 | 1 | 0 | 12 | 4 | | 6 | 5 | 1 | 0 | 23 | 7 | 83.33 | 1963–64 | 1965–66 |
| Vardar | 23 | 15 | 7 | 1 | 40 | 11 | | 23 | 1 | 8 | 14 | 14 | 37 | | 46 | 16 | 15 | 15 | 54 | 48 | 34.78 | 1946–47 | 1989–90 |
| Velež | 28 | 19 | 8 | 1 | 50 | 20 | | 28 | 3 | 5 | 20 | 34 | 61 | | 56 | 22 | 13 | 21 | 84 | 81 | 39.29 | 1958–59 | 1990–91 |
| Vojvodina | 27 | 18 | 7 | 2 | 50 | 25 | | 27 | 1 | 11 | 15 | 16 | 48 | | 54 | 19 | 18 | 17 | 66 | 73 | 35.19 | 1958–59 | 1990–91 |
| NK Zagreb | 10 | 5 | 4 | 1 | 18 | 9 | | 10 | 3 | 2 | 5 | 12 | 16 | | 20 | 8 | 6 | 6 | 30 | 25 | 40.00 | 1964–65 | 1981–82 |
| Zemun | 2 | 1 | 0 | 1 | 3 | 3 | | 2 | 0 | 1 | 1 | 1 | 3 | | 4 | 1 | 1 | 2 | 4 | 6 | 25.00 | 1982–83 | 1990–91 |
| Željezničar | 25 | 12 | 8 | 5 | 37 | 19 | 25 | 4 | 5 | 16 | 24 | 52 | 50 | 16 | 13 | 21 | 61 | 71 | 32.00 | 1958–59 | 1990–91 | | |

== Yugoslav First League qualifiers all-time record (1946–47, 1947–48, 1952, 1957–58, 1967–68 and 1969–72) ==
| Opponent | P | W | D | L | F | A | P | W | D | L | F | A | P | W | D | L | F | A | Win% | First | Last | Notes | |
| Opponent | Home | | | | | | Away | | | | | | Total | | | | | | Win% | First | Last | Notes | |
|---|---|---|---|---|---|---|---|---|---|---|---|---|---|---|---|---|---|---|---|---|---|---|---|
| Crvena Lokomotiva | 1 | 0 | 0 | 1 | 2 | 3 | | 1 | 0 | 0 | 1 | 0 | 1 | | 2 | 0 | 0 | 2 | 2 | 4 | 0.00 | 1946–47 | 1946–47 |
| Crvenka | 2 | 1 | 1 | 0 | 1 | 0 | | 2 | 0 | 1 | 1 | 2 | 5 | | 4 | 1 | 2 | 1 | 3 | 5 | 25.00 | 1969–70 | 1971–72 |
| Metalac Zagreb | 1 | 0 | 0 | 1 | 0 | 2 | | 1 | 1 | 0 | 0 | 2 | 1 | | 2 | 1 | 0 | 1 | 2 | 3 | 50.00 | 1952 | 1952 |
| Napredak | 1 | 1 | 0 | 0 | 6 | 2 | | 1 | 0 | 1 | 0 | 0 | 0 | | 2 | 1 | 1 | 0 | 6 | 2 | 50.00 | 1957–58 | 1957–58 |
| Operaia Pula ‡ | 1 | 0 | 0 | 1 | 1 | 2 | | 1 | 1 | 0 | 0 | 4 | 1 | | 2 | 1 | 0 | 1 | 5 | 3 | 50.00 | 1946–47 | 1946–47 |
| Osijek | 2 | 0 | 1 | 1 | 1 | 2 | | 2 | 0 | 1 | 1 | 1 | 4 | | 4 | 0 | 2 | 2 | 2 | 6 | 0.00 | 1952 | 1970–71 |
| Slavija Karlovac ‡ | 1 | 1 | 0 | 0 | 10 | 0 | | 1 | 1 | 0 | 0 | 3 | 2 | | 2 | 2 | 0 | 0 | 13 | 2 | 100.00 | 1952 | 1952 |
| Sloboda | 1 | 1 | 0 | 0 | 4 | 0 | | 1 | 0 | 0 | 1 | 0 | 3 | | 2 | 1 | 0 | 1 | 4 | 3 | 50.00 | 1967–68 | 1967–68 |
| Spartak | 1 | 1 | 0 | 0 | 3 | 0 | | 1 | 0 | 1 | 0 | 0 | 0 | | 2 | 1 | 1 | 0 | 3 | 0 | 50.00 | 1957–58 | 1957–58 |

== Yugoslav Second League (1947–48, 1950–53, 1955–58 and 1969–74) and third tier (1948–49 and 1953–55) all-time record ==
| Opponent | P | W | D | L | F | A | P | W | D | L | F | A | P | W | D | L | F | A | Win% | First | Last | Notes | |
| Opponent | Home | | | | | | Away | | | | | | Total | | | | | | Win% | First | Last | Notes | |
|---|---|---|---|---|---|---|---|---|---|---|---|---|---|---|---|---|---|---|---|---|---|---|---|
| 11 Oktomvri | 1 | 1 | 0 | 0 | 10 | 0 | | 1 | 1 | 0 | 0 | 6 | 1 | | 2 | 2 | 0 | 0 | 16 | 1 | 100.00 | 1950 | 1950 |
| Bačka | 1 | 0 | 1 | 0 | 0 | 0 | | 1 | 0 | 1 | 0 | 1 | 1 | | 2 | 0 | 2 | 0 | 1 | 1 | 0.00 | 1973–74 | 1973–74 |
| Bokelj | 1 | 1 | 0 | 0 | 5 | 0 | | 1 | 0 | 1 | 0 | 1 | 1 | | 2 | 1 | 1 | 0 | 6 | 1 | 50.00 | 1951 | 1951 |
| Borac Banja Luka | 1 | 0 | 1 | 0 | 1 | 1 | | 1 | 1 | 0 | 0 | 2 | 1 | | 2 | 1 | 1 | 0 | 3 | 2 | 50.00 | 1969–70 | 1969–70 |
| Borac Zagreb ‡ | 2 | 1 | 0 | 1 | 4 | 4 | | 2 | 0 | 0 | 2 | 1 | 5 | | 4 | 1 | 0 | 3 | 5 | 9 | 25.00 | 1948–49 | 1950 |
| Borovo | 3 | 2 | 0 | 1 | 6 | 3 | | 3 | 0 | 0 | 3 | 2 | 10 | | 6 | 2 | 0 | 4 | 8 | 13 | 33.33 | 1948–49 | 1954–55 |
| Braća Bakić | 1 | 1 | 0 | 0 | 4 | 1 | | 1 | 1 | 0 | 0 | 2 | 1 | | 2 | 2 | 0 | 0 | 6 | 2 | 100.00 | 1948–49 | 1948–49 |
| Branik Maribor ‡ | 4 | 4 | 0 | 0 | 10 | 1 | | 4 | 1 | 0 | 3 | 7 | 10 | | 8 | 5 | 0 | 3 | 17 | 11 | 62.50 | 1952–53 | 1957–58 |
| BSK Banja Luka | 1 | 1 | 0 | 0 | 5 | 0 | | 1 | 1 | 0 | 0 | 2 | 0 | | 2 | 2 | 0 | 0 | 7 | 0 | 100.00 | 1969–70 | 1969–70 |
| Budućnost | 2 | 1 | 0 | 1 | 3 | 4 | | 2 | 0 | 0 | 2 | 0 | 9 | | 4 | 1 | 0 | 3 | 3 | 13 | 25.00 | 1947–48 | 1951 |
| Crikvenica | 1 | 1 | 0 | 0 | 4 | 1 | | 1 | 1 | 0 | 0 | 3 | 0 | | 2 | 2 | 0 | 0 | 7 | 1 | 100.00 | 1952 | 1952 |
| Crvenka | 1 | 0 | 1 | 0 | 1 | 1 | | 1 | 1 | 0 | 0 | 3 | 0 | | 2 | 1 | 1 | 0 | 4 | 1 | 50.00 | 1973–74 | 1973–74 |
| Dinamo Pančevo | 3 | 2 | 0 | 1 | 10 | 3 | | 3 | 0 | 2 | 1 | 3 | 7 | | 6 | 2 | 2 | 2 | 13 | 10 | 33.33 | 1947–48 | 1973–74 |
| Dinamo Vinkovci | 1 | 1 | 0 | 0 | 2 | 1 | | 1 | 1 | 0 | 0 | 2 | 0 | | 2 | 2 | 0 | 0 | 4 | 1 | 100.00 | 1973–74 | 1973–74 |
| Elektrostroj Zagreb ‡ | 1 | 1 | 0 | 0 | 3 | 0 | | 1 | 1 | 0 | 0 | 3 | 0 | | 2 | 2 | 0 | 0 | 6 | 0 | 100.00 | 1957–58 | 1957–58 |
| Famos | 1 | 1 | 0 | 0 | 2 | 0 | | 1 | 0 | 1 | 0 | 0 | 0 | | 2 | 1 | 1 | 0 | 2 | 0 | 50.00 | 1973–74 | 1973–74 |
| Goranin | 1 | 1 | 0 | 0 | 9 | 0 | | 1 | 1 | 0 | 0 | 2 | 0 | | 2 | 2 | 0 | 0 | 11 | 0 | 100.00 | 1952 | 1952 |
| Grafičar Zagreb ‡ | 1 | 1 | 0 | 0 | 8 | 0 | | 1 | 1 | 0 | 0 | 7 | 0 | | 2 | 2 | 0 | 0 | 15 | 0 | 100.00 | 1956–57 | 1956–57 |
| Igman | 1 | 1 | 0 | 0 | 1 | 0 | | 1 | 0 | 1 | 0 | 1 | 1 | | 2 | 1 | 1 | 0 | 2 | 1 | 50.00 | 1973–74 | 1973–74 |
| Iskra | 1 | 1 | 0 | 0 | 3 | 0 | | 1 | 0 | 1 | 0 | 0 | 0 | | 2 | 1 | 1 | 0 | 3 | 0 | 50.00 | 1973–74 | 1973–74 |
| Istra | 2 | 1 | 1 | 0 | 2 | 0 | | 2 | 1 | 0 | 1 | 1 | 1 | | 4 | 2 | 1 | 1 | 3 | 1 | 50.00 | 1971–72 | 1972–73 |
| Jadran Kaštel Sućurac | 2 | 2 | 0 | 0 | 8 | 0 | | 2 | 1 | 0 | 1 | 5 | 3 | | 4 | 3 | 0 | 1 | 13 | 3 | 75.00 | 1956–57 | 1957–58 |
| Jedinstvo Bihać | 4 | 4 | 0 | 0 | 12 | 1 | | 4 | 3 | 0 | 1 | 9 | 3 | | 8 | 7 | 0 | 1 | 21 | 4 | 87.50 | 1969–70 | 1972–73 |
| Jedinstvo Ogulin | 1 | 1 | 0 | 0 | 7 | 0 | | 1 | 1 | 0 | 0 | 2 | 0 | | 2 | 2 | 0 | 0 | 9 | 0 | 100.00 | 1952 | 1952 |
| Junak | 1 | 1 | 0 | 0 | 5 | 0 | | 1 | 0 | 1 | 0 | 0 | 0 | | 2 | 1 | 1 | 0 | 5 | 0 | 50.00 | 1971–72 | 1971–72 |
| Karlovac ‡ | 7 | 5 | 1 | 1 | 11 | 3 | | 7 | 4 | 2 | 1 | 11 | 4 | | 14 | 9 | 3 | 2 | 22 | 7 | 64.29 | 1952–53 | 1973–74 |
| Kladivar | 2 | 2 | 0 | 0 | 11 | 0 | | 2 | 1 | 0 | 1 | 2 | 1 | | 4 | 3 | 0 | 1 | 13 | 1 | 75.00 | 1953–54 | 1954–55 |
| Korotan ‡ | 1 | 1 | 0 | 0 | 4 | 2 | | 1 | 1 | 0 | 0 | 2 | 0 | | 2 | 2 | 0 | 0 | 6 | 2 | 100.00 | 1953–54 | 1953–54 |
| Kozara | 3 | 3 | 0 | 0 | 4 | 1 | | 3 | 0 | 1 | 2 | 3 | 5 | | 6 | 3 | 1 | 2 | 7 | 6 | 50.00 | 1971–72 | 1973–74 |
| Leotar | 1 | 1 | 0 | 0 | 1 | 0 | | 1 | 0 | 1 | 0 | 0 | 0 | | 2 | 1 | 1 | 0 | 1 | 0 | 50.00 | 1973–74 | 1973–74 |
| Lokomotiva Rijeka | 2 | 2 | 0 | 0 | 6 | 0 | | 2 | 2 | 0 | 0 | 5 | 1 | | 4 | 4 | 0 | 0 | 11 | 1 | 100.00 | 1952 | 1953–54 |
| Lokomotiva Zagreb | 3 | 1 | 1 | 1 | 7 | 5 | | 3 | 0 | 1 | 2 | 3 | 7 | | 6 | 1 | 2 | 3 | 10 | 12 | 16.67 | 1955–56 | 1969–70 |
| Ljubljana ‡ | 9 | 7 | 2 | 0 | 31 | 6 | | 9 | 2 | 3 | 4 | 8 | 10 | | 18 | 9 | 5 | 4 | 39 | 16 | 50.00 | 1952–53 | 1971–72 |
| Maribor | 2 | 1 | 1 | 0 | 2 | 1 | | 2 | 0 | 0 | 2 | 1 | 8 | | 4 | 1 | 1 | 2 | 3 | 9 | 25.00 | 1972–73 | 1973–74 |
| Mercator | 3 | 3 | 0 | 0 | 5 | 0 | | 3 | 1 | 1 | 1 | 5 | 3 | | 6 | 4 | 1 | 1 | 10 | 3 | 66.67 | 1971–72 | 1973–74 |
| Metalac Zagreb | 10 | 6 | 2 | 2 | 20 | 6 | | 10 | 5 | 0 | 5 | 27 | 19 | | 20 | 11 | 2 | 7 | 47 | 25 | 55.00 | 1947–48 | 1970–71 |
| Mornar Split ‡ | 1 | 0 | 0 | 1 | 0 | 3 | | 1 | 0 | 0 | 1 | 0 | 3 | | 2 | 0 | 0 | 2 | 0 | 6 | 0.00 | 1947–48 | 1947–48 |
| Mura ‡ | 4 | 4 | 0 | 0 | 8 | 1 | | 4 | 2 | 1 | 1 | 4 | 2 | | 8 | 6 | 1 | 1 | 12 | 3 | 75.00 | 1970–71 | 1973–74 |
| Napredak | 1 | 1 | 0 | 0 | 2 | 1 | | 1 | 0 | 0 | 1 | 0 | 1 | | 2 | 1 | 0 | 1 | 2 | 2 | 50.00 | 1950 | 1950 |
| Naša Krila ‡ | 1 | 0 | 0 | 1 | 3 | 5 | | 1 | 0 | 0 | 1 | 1 | 4 | | 2 | 0 | 0 | 2 | 4 | 9 | 0.00 | 1947–48 | 1947–48 |
| Nehaj | 1 | 1 | 0 | 0 | 7 | 0 | | 1 | 0 | 0 | 1 | 2 | 3 | | 2 | 1 | 0 | 1 | 9 | 3 | 50.00 | 1952 | 1952 |
| Nova Gorica | 1 | 1 | 0 | 0 | 2 | 1 | | 1 | 0 | 0 | 1 | 2 | 4 | | 2 | 1 | 0 | 1 | 4 | 5 | 50.00 | 1955–56 | 1955–56 |
| Novi Sad | 1 | 1 | 0 | 0 | 4 | 1 | | 1 | 0 | 0 | 1 | 0 | 2 | | 2 | 1 | 0 | 1 | 4 | 3 | 50.00 | 1973–74 | 1973–74 |
| Olimpija ‡ | 7 | 4 | 2 | 1 | 13 | 9 | | 7 | 2 | 1 | 4 | 6 | 13 | | 14 | 6 | 3 | 5 | 19 | 22 | 42.86 | 1947–48 | 1957–58 |
| Orijent ‡ | 6 | 5 | 0 | 1 | 21 | 4 | | 6 | 5 | 1 | 0 | 11 | 1 | | 12 | 10 | 1 | 1 | 32 | 5 | 83.33 | 1952 | 1972–73 |
| Osijek | 4 | 3 | 1 | 0 | 16 | 3 | | 4 | 1 | 0 | 3 | 6 | 13 | | 8 | 4 | 1 | 3 | 22 | 16 | 50.00 | 1950 | 1973–74 |
| Podrinje | 1 | 1 | 0 | 0 | 2 | 1 | | 1 | 0 | 1 | 0 | 0 | 0 | | 2 | 1 | 1 | 0 | 2 | 1 | 50.00 | 1950 | 1950 |
| Proleter Pula ‡ | 2 | 1 | 0 | 1 | 5 | 3 | | 2 | 1 | 0 | 1 | 5 | 4 | | 4 | 2 | 0 | 2 | 10 | 7 | 50.00 | 1948–49 | 1952 |
| Proleter ‡ | 1 | 0 | 1 | 0 | 0 | 0 | | 1 | 1 | 0 | 0 | 3 | 1 | | 2 | 1 | 1 | 0 | 3 | 1 | 50.00 | 1951 | 1951 |
| Rabotnički | 2 | 2 | 0 | 0 | 6 | 1 | | 2 | 0 | 1 | 1 | 1 | 5 | | 4 | 2 | 1 | 1 | 7 | 6 | 50.00 | 1947–48 | 1951 |
| Radnički Beograd | 1 | 1 | 0 | 0 | 3 | 2 | | 1 | 0 | 0 | 1 | 1 | 2 | | 2 | 1 | 0 | 1 | 4 | 4 | 50.00 | 1951 | 1951 |
| Rovinj | 1 | 0 | 0 | 1 | 1 | 2 | | 1 | 1 | 0 | 0 | 3 | 0 | | 2 | 1 | 0 | 1 | 4 | 2 | 50.00 | 1970–71 | 1970–71 |
| Rudar Labin | 1 | 1 | 0 | 0 | 7 | 1 | | 1 | 0 | 1 | 0 | 1 | 1 | | 2 | 1 | 1 | 0 | 8 | 2 | 50.00 | 1952 | 1952 |
| Rudar Ljubija | 4 | 2 | 0 | 2 | 7 | 3 | | 4 | 1 | 1 | 2 | 1 | 3 | | 8 | 3 | 1 | 4 | 8 | 6 | 37.50 | 1969–70 | 1972–73 |
| Rudar Trbovlje | 3 | 3 | 0 | 0 | 14 | 5 | | 3 | 1 | 0 | 2 | 6 | 6 | | 6 | 4 | 0 | 2 | 20 | 11 | 66.67 | 1951 | 1972–73 |
| Segesta | 6 | 5 | 0 | 1 | 18 | 6 | | 6 | 2 | 0 | 4 | 10 | 13 | | 12 | 7 | 0 | 5 | 28 | 19 | 58.33 | 1948–49 | 1972–73 |
| Sloboda Bosanski Novi | 1 | 1 | 0 | 0 | 3 | 0 | | 1 | 0 | 1 | 0 | 0 | 0 | | 2 | 1 | 1 | 0 | 3 | 0 | 50.00 | 1972–73 | 1972–73 |
| Sloboda Varaždin | 1 | 0 | 0 | 1 | 1 | 2 | | 1 | 0 | 0 | 1 | 1 | 2 | | 2 | 0 | 0 | 2 | 2 | 4 | 0.00 | 1953–54 | 1953–54 |
| Spartak | 1 | 1 | 0 | 0 | 1 | 0 | | 1 | 0 | 0 | 1 | 0 | 2 | | 2 | 1 | 0 | 1 | 1 | 2 | 50.00 | 1973–74 | 1973–74 |
| RNK Split | 8 | 5 | 2 | 1 | 20 | 9 | | 8 | 3 | 2 | 3 | 4 | 9 | | 16 | 8 | 4 | 4 | 24 | 18 | 50.00 | 1953–54 | 1972–73 |
| Šibenik | 11 | 8 | 2 | 1 | 15 | 6 | | 11 | 6 | 0 | 5 | 18 | 19 | | 22 | 14 | 2 | 6 | 33 | 25 | 63.64 | 1948–49 | 1973–74 |
| Trešnjevka | 8 | 5 | 3 | 0 | 19 | 6 | | 8 | 4 | 3 | 1 | 6 | 6 | | 16 | 9 | 6 | 1 | 25 | 12 | 56.25 | 1954–55 | 1972–73 |
| Turbina Karlovac ‡ | 1 | 1 | 0 | 0 | 5 | 2 | | 1 | 1 | 0 | 0 | 1 | 0 | | 2 | 2 | 0 | 0 | 6 | 2 | 100.00 | 1956–57 | 1956–57 |
| Uljanik | 4 | 4 | 0 | 0 | 16 | 2 | | 4 | 1 | 1 | 2 | 6 | 7 | | 8 | 5 | 1 | 2 | 22 | 9 | 62.50 | 1952 | 1957–58 |
| Vardar | 2 | 1 | 1 | 0 | 1 | 0 | | 2 | 0 | 0 | 2 | 1 | 5 | | 4 | 1 | 1 | 2 | 2 | 5 | 25.00 | 1950 | 1951 |
| Varteks ‡ | 12 | 7 | 2 | 3 | 22 | 9 | | 12 | 5 | 1 | 6 | 21 | 25 | | 24 | 12 | 3 | 9 | 43 | 34 | 50.00 | 1947–48 | 1972–73 |
| Velež | 1 | 0 | 0 | 1 | 1 | 3 | | 1 | 1 | 0 | 0 | 5 | 2 | | 2 | 1 | 0 | 1 | 6 | 4 | 50.00 | 1951 | 1951 |
| Vojvodina | 2 | 0 | 0 | 2 | 2 | 7 | | 2 | 0 | 0 | 2 | 0 | 5 | | 4 | 0 | 0 | 4 | 2 | 12 | 0.00 | 1947–48 | 1950 |
| Zadar ‡ | 2 | 2 | 0 | 0 | 6 | 1 | | 2 | 2 | 0 | 0 | 4 | 1 | | 4 | 4 | 0 | 0 | 10 | 2 | 100.00 | 1948–49 | 1969–70 |
| NK Zagreb | 5 | 3 | 1 | 1 | 5 | 8 | | 5 | 3 | 1 | 1 | 9 | 6 | | 10 | 6 | 2 | 2 | 14 | 14 | 60.00 | 1948–49 | 1972–73 |
| Zagrebački Plavi ‡ | 2 | 0 | 1 | 1 | 1 | 2 | | 2 | 2 | 0 | 0 | 10 | 1 | | 4 | 2 | 1 | 1 | 11 | 3 | 50.00 | 1970–71 | 1971–72 |
| Železničar | 4 | 4 | 0 | 0 | 14 | 3 | 4 | 2 | 2 | 0 | 4 | 0 | 8 | 6 | 2 | 0 | 18 | 3 | 75.00 | 1954–55 | 1971–72 | | |
| Željezničar | 3 | 2 | 1 | 0 | 7 | 5 | 3 | 0 | 1 | 2 | 2 | 7 | 6 | 2 | 2 | 2 | 9 | 12 | 33.33 | 1947–48 | 1951 | | |

== Yugoslav Cup all-time record (1947–91) ==
| Opponent | P | W | D | L | F | A | P | W | D | L | F | A | P | W | D | L | F | A | Win% | First | Last | Notes | | |
| Opponent | Home | | | | | | Away | | | | | | Total | | | | | | Win% | First | Last | Notes | | |
|---|---|---|---|---|---|---|---|---|---|---|---|---|---|---|---|---|---|---|---|---|---|---|---|---|
| Belasica | 1 | 1 | 0 | 0 | 4 | 1 | | 0 | 0 | 0 | 0 | 0 | 0 | | 1 | 1 | 0 | 0 | 4 | 1 | 100.00 | 1985–86 | 1985–86 | |
| Bor | 1 | 1 | 0 | 0 | 1 | 0 | | 0 | 0 | 0 | 0 | 0 | 0 | | 1 | 1 | 0 | 0 | 1 | 0 | 100.00 | 1968–69 | 1968–69 | |
| Borac Čačak | 1 | 1 | 0 | 0 | 3 | 0 | | 1 | 0 | 0 | 1 | 0 | 1 | | 2 | 1 | 0 | 1 | 3 | 1 | 50.00 | 1978–79 | 1987–88 | |
| Budućnost | 1 | 1 | 0 | 0 | 2 | 1 | | 2 | 0 | 1 | 1 | 1 | 2 | | 3 | 1 | 1 | 1 | 3 | 3 | 33.33 | 1985–86 | 1986–87 | |
| Crvena Zastava | 1 | 1 | 0 | 0 | 5 | 0 | | 1 | 0 | 1 | 0 | 1 | 1 | | 2 | 1 | 1 | 0 | 6 | 1 | 50.00 | 1986–87 | 1986–87 | |
| Dinamo Vinkovci | 0 | 0 | 0 | 0 | 0 | 0 | | 1 | 1 | 0 | 0 | 1 | 0 | | 1 | 1 | 0 | 0 | 1 | 0 | 100.00 | 1977–78 | 1977–78 | |
| Dinamo Zagreb | 1 | 0 | 0 | 1 | 1 | 3 | | 1 | 0 | 0 | 1 | 1 | 5 | | 2 | 0 | 0 | 2 | 2 | 8 | 0.00 | 1963–64 | 1982–83 | |
| Dinara | 1 | 1 | 0 | 0 | 4 | 0 | | 0 | 0 | 0 | 0 | 0 | 0 | | 1 | 1 | 0 | 0 | 4 | 0 | 100.00 | 1948 | 1948 | |
| Drina | 1 | 1 | 0 | 0 | 2 | 1 | | 0 | 0 | 0 | 0 | 0 | 0 | | 1 | 1 | 0 | 0 | 2 | 1 | 100.00 | 1983–84 | 1983–84 | |
| Hajduk Split | 2 | 1 | 0 | 1 | 3 | 3 | | 2 | 1 | 1 | 0 | 2 | 1 | | 5 | 2 | 2 | 1 | 6 | 5 | 40.00 | 1970–71 | 1990–91 | ^{[A]} |
| Istra | 1 | 0 | 1 | 0 | 0 | 0 | | 0 | 0 | 0 | 0 | 0 | 0 | | 1 | 0 | 1 | 0 | 0 | 0 | 0.00 | 1978–79 | 1978–79 | |
| Jedinstvo Bačka Topola | 0 | 0 | 0 | 0 | 0 | 0 | | 1 | 0 | 0 | 1 | 1 | 5 | | 1 | 0 | 0 | 1 | 1 | 5 | 0.00 | 1949 | 1949 | |
| Jedinstvo Čakovec | 1 | 1 | 0 | 0 | 4 | 0 | | 0 | 0 | 0 | 0 | 0 | 0 | | 1 | 1 | 0 | 0 | 4 | 0 | 100.00 | 1947 | 1947 | |
| Karlovac ‡ | 1 | 1 | 0 | 0 | 5 | 2 | | 0 | 0 | 0 | 0 | 0 | 0 | | 1 | 1 | 0 | 0 | 5 | 2 | 100.00 | 1950 | 1950 | |
| Lokomotiva Rijeka | 0 | 0 | 0 | 0 | 0 | 0 | | 1 | 1 | 0 | 0 | 3 | 2 | | 1 | 1 | 0 | 0 | 3 | 2 | 100.00 | 1951 | 1951 | |
| Mačva | 0 | 0 | 0 | 0 | 0 | 0 | | 1 | 0 | 0 | 1 | 0 | 4 | | 1 | 0 | 0 | 1 | 0 | 4 | 0.00 | 1954 | 1954 | |
| Maribor | 0 | 0 | 0 | 0 | 0 | 0 | | 1 | 0 | 0 | 1 | 0 | 3 | | 1 | 0 | 0 | 1 | 0 | 3 | 0.00 | 1962–63 | 1962–63 | |
| Mornar Split ‡ | 1 | 0 | 0 | 1 | 0 | 4 | | 0 | 0 | 0 | 0 | 0 | 0 | | 1 | 0 | 0 | 1 | 0 | 4 | 0.00 | 1947 | 1947 | |
| Napredak | 1 | 1 | 0 | 0 | 1 | 0 | | 1 | 0 | 0 | 1 | 1 | 3 | | 2 | 1 | 0 | 1 | 2 | 3 | 50.00 | 1976–77 | 1988–89 | |
| Nova Gorica | 1 | 1 | 0 | 0 | 5 | 4 | | 0 | 0 | 0 | 0 | 0 | 0 | | 1 | 1 | 0 | 0 | 5 | 4 | 100.00 | 1948 | 1948 | |
| Novi Sad | 0 | 0 | 0 | 0 | 0 | 0 | | 1 | 0 | 0 | 1 | 0 | 1 | | 1 | 0 | 0 | 1 | 0 | 1 | 0.00 | 1976–77 | 1976–77 | |
| OFK Beograd | 0 | 0 | 0 | 0 | 0 | 0 | | 1 | 0 | 0 | 1 | 0 | 1 | | 1 | 0 | 0 | 1 | 0 | 1 | 0.00 | 1967–68 | 1967–68 | |
| Olimpija ‡ | 1 | 0 | 0 | 1 | 0 | 1 | | 2 | 1 | 0 | 1 | 3 | 5 | | 3 | 1 | 0 | 2 | 3 | 6 | 33.33 | 1958–59 | 1981–82 | |
| Omladinac Novo Selo Rok | 0 | 0 | 0 | 0 | 0 | 0 | | 1 | 1 | 0 | 0 | 4 | 0 | | 1 | 1 | 0 | 0 | 4 | 0 | 100.00 | 1982–83 | 1982–83 | |
| Orijent ‡ | 0 | 0 | 0 | 0 | 0 | 0 | | 2 | 1 | 0 | 1 | 2 | 2 | | 2 | 1 | 0 | 1 | 2 | 2 | 50.00 | 1969–70 | 1989–90 | |
| Osijek | 1 | 0 | 1 | 0 | 0 | 0 | | 1 | 0 | 0 | 1 | 1 | 2 | | 2 | 0 | 1 | 1 | 1 | 2 | 0.00 | 1952 | 1965–66 | |
| Partizan | 4 | 3 | 0 | 1 | 6 | 3 | | 4 | 0 | 3 | 1 | 3 | 4 | | 8 | 3 | 3 | 2 | 9 | 7 | 37.50 | 1950 | 1984–85 | |
| Ponziana | 2 | 1 | 0 | 1 | 5 | 5 | | 0 | 0 | 0 | 0 | 0 | 0 | | 2 | 1 | 0 | 1 | 5 | 5 | 50.00 | 1947 | 1948 | |
| Priština | 1 | 1 | 0 | 0 | 2 | 0 | | 0 | 0 | 0 | 0 | 0 | 0 | | 1 | 1 | 0 | 0 | 2 | 0 | 100.00 | 1981–82 | 1981–82 | |
| Proleter Pula ‡ | 0 | 0 | 0 | 0 | 0 | 0 | | 1 | 0 | 0 | 1 | 1 | 2 | | 1 | 0 | 0 | 1 | 1 | 2 | 0.00 | 1951 | 1951 | |
| Rabotnički | 0 | 0 | 0 | 0 | 0 | 0 | | 1 | 0 | 0 | 1 | 2 | 3 | | 1 | 0 | 0 | 1 | 2 | 3 | 0.00 | 1960–61 | 1960–61 | |
| Rad | 0 | 0 | 0 | 0 | 0 | 0 | | 1 | 1 | 0 | 0 | 2 | 0 | | 1 | 1 | 0 | 0 | 2 | 0 | 100.00 | 1984–85 | 1984–85 | |
| Radnički Beograd | 1 | 1 | 0 | 0 | 2 | 1 | | 0 | 0 | 0 | 0 | 0 | 0 | | 1 | 1 | 0 | 0 | 2 | 1 | 100.00 | 1958–59 | 1958–59 | |
| Radnički Niš | 0 | 0 | 0 | 0 | 0 | 0 | | 2 | 1 | 0 | 1 | 1 | 1 | | 2 | 1 | 0 | 1 | 1 | 1 | 50.00 | 1964–65 | 1978–79 | |
| Red Star | 3 | 0 | 1 | 2 | 2 | 7 | | 4 | 2 | 0 | 2 | 6 | 12 | | 7 | 2 | 1 | 4 | 8 | 19 | 28.57 | 1952 | 1983–84 | |
| Sarajevo | 0 | 0 | 0 | 0 | 0 | 0 | | 1 | 0 | 1 | 0 | 1 | 1 | | 1 | 0 | 1 | 0 | 1 | 1 | 0.00 | 1979–80 | 1979–80 | |
| Sloboda | 1 | 1 | 0 | 0 | 4 | 1 | | 1 | 0 | 0 | 1 | 0 | 2 | | 2 | 1 | 0 | 1 | 4 | 3 | 50.00 | 1990–91 | 1990–91 | |
| Spartak | 0 | 0 | 0 | 0 | 0 | 0 | | 1 | 0 | 0 | 1 | 1 | 5 | | 1 | 0 | 0 | 1 | 1 | 5 | 0.00 | 1959–60 | 1959–60 | |
| Sutjeska | 0 | 0 | 0 | 0 | 0 | 0 | | 1 | 1 | 0 | 0 | 2 | 0 | | 1 | 1 | 0 | 0 | 2 | 0 | 100.00 | 1961–62 | 1961–62 | |
| Trepča | 0 | 0 | 0 | 0 | 0 | 0 | 0 | 0 | 0 | 0 | 0 | 0 | 1 | 1 | 0 | 0 | 1 | 0 | 100.00 | 1977–78 | 1977–78 | ^{[B]} | | |
| Vardar | 1 | 1 | 0 | 0 | 3 | 2 | 1 | 0 | 0 | 1 | 0 | 3 | 2 | 1 | 0 | 1 | 3 | 5 | 50.00 | 1989–90 | 1989–90 | | | |
| Varteks ‡ | 1 | 1 | 0 | 0 | 4 | 2 | 0 | 0 | 0 | 0 | 0 | 0 | 1 | 1 | 0 | 0 | 4 | 2 | 100.00 | 1958–59 | 1958–59 | | | |
| Velež | 2 | 1 | 0 | 1 | 4 | 3 | 1 | 0 | 0 | 1 | 1 | 6 | 3 | 1 | 0 | 2 | 5 | 9 | 33.33 | 1961–62 | 1977–78 | | | |
| Vitez | 0 | 0 | 0 | 0 | 0 | 0 | 1 | 0 | 1 | 0 | 0 | 0 | 1 | 0 | 1 | 0 | 0 | 0 | 0.00 | 1983–84 | 1983–84 | | | |
| Vlaznimi | 1 | 1 | 0 | 0 | 2 | 0 | 0 | 0 | 0 | 0 | 0 | 0 | 1 | 1 | 0 | 0 | 2 | 0 | 100.00 | 1986–87 | 1986–87 | | | |
| Vojvodina | 2 | 2 | 0 | 0 | 2 | 0 | 0 | 0 | 0 | 0 | 0 | 0 | 2 | 2 | 0 | 0 | 2 | 0 | 100.00 | 1952 | 1982–83 | | | |
| Zadar ‡ | 0 | 0 | 0 | 0 | 0 | 0 | 1 | 0 | 1 | 0 | 0 | 0 | 1 | 0 | 1 | 0 | 0 | 0 | 0.00 | 1990–91 | 1990–91 | | | |
| Željezničar | 1 | 0 | 1 | 0 | 0 | 0 | 1 | 0 | 1 | 0 | 0 | 0 | 2 | 0 | 2 | 0 | 0 | 0 | 0.00 | 1986–87 | 1986–87 | | | |

== Overall record (by club) ==
The list only includes clubs Rijeka has faced in 10 or more official matches. Updated 16 October 2026.

| Opponent | P | W | D | L | F | A | P | W | D | L | F | A | P | W | D | L | F | A | Win% | Notes | | |
| Opponent | Home | | | | | | Away | | | | | | Total | | | | | | Win% | Notes | | |
|---|---|---|---|---|---|---|---|---|---|---|---|---|---|---|---|---|---|---|---|---|---|---|
| Borac | 10 | 5 | 4 | 1 | 15 | 5 | | 10 | 2 | 4 | 4 | 10 | 14 | | 20 | 7 | 8 | 5 | 25 | 19 | 35.00 | |
| Budućnost | 23 | 14 | 7 | 2 | 33 | 12 | | 24 | 3 | 5 | 16 | 19 | 45 | | 47 | 17 | 12 | 18 | 52 | 57 | 36.17 | |
| Cibalia | 35 | 22 | 9 | 4 | 70 | 25 | | 37 | 11 | 11 | 15 | 38 | 51 | | 72 | 33 | 20 | 19 | 108 | 76 | 45.83 | |
| Čelik | 12 | 10 | 2 | 0 | 24 | 5 | | 12 | 3 | 5 | 4 | 16 | 17 | | 24 | 13 | 7 | 4 | 40 | 22 | 54.17 | |
| Dinamo Zagreb | 92 | 34 | 29 | 29 | 119 | 115 | | 97 | 10 | 16 | 71 | 67 | 226 | | 192 | 46 | 45 | 101 | 192 | 345 | 23.96 | ^{[N]} ^{[P]} |
| Gorica | 16 | 10 | 1 | 5 | 23 | 14 | | 18 | 8 | 4 | 6 | 23 | 20 | | 34 | 18 | 5 | 11 | 46 | 34 | 52.94 | |
| Hajduk Split | 92 | 37 | 32 | 23 | 123 | 85 | | 92 | 22 | 25 | 45 | 106 | 163 | | 185 | 59 | 58 | 68 | 230 | 249 | 31.89 | ^{[A]} ^{[O]} |
| Hrvatski Dragovoljac | 13 | 11 | 2 | 0 | 32 | 9 | | 17 | 6 | 5 | 6 | 23 | 20 | | 30 | 17 | 7 | 6 | 55 | 29 | 56.67 | |
| Inter Zaprešić | 29 | 18 | 7 | 4 | 58 | 21 | | 31 | 12 | 8 | 11 | 42 | 41 | | 60 | 30 | 15 | 15 | 100 | 62 | 50.00 | |
| Istra | 11 | 7 | 4 | 0 | 23 | 4 | | 11 | 3 | 1 | 7 | 7 | 10 | | 22 | 10 | 5 | 7 | 30 | 14 | 45.45 | |
| Istra 1961 | 41 | 29 | 9 | 3 | 92 | 28 | | 40 | 22 | 10 | 8 | 60 | 35 | | 81 | 51 | 19 | 11 | 152 | 63 | 62.96 | |
| Kamen Ingrad | 9 | 8 | 0 | 1 | 23 | 8 | | 9 | 4 | 0 | 5 | 9 | 12 | | 18 | 12 | 0 | 6 | 32 | 20 | 66.67 | |
| Karlovac | 12 | 8 | 3 | 1 | 30 | 6 | | 11 | 7 | 2 | 2 | 17 | 9 | | 23 | 15 | 5 | 3 | 47 | 15 | 65.22 | |
| Lokomotiva | 37 | 25 | 7 | 5 | 90 | 36 | | 41 | 17 | 7 | 17 | 52 | 48 | | 79 | 43 | 14 | 22 | 143 | 84 | 54.43 | ^{[S]} |
| Ljubljana | 9 | 7 | 2 | 0 | 31 | 6 | | 9 | 2 | 3 | 4 | 8 | 10 | | 18 | 9 | 5 | 4 | 39 | 16 | 50.00 | |
| Marsonia | 9 | 8 | 0 | 1 | 19 | 7 | | 7 | 2 | 1 | 4 | 7 | 9 | | 16 | 10 | 1 | 5 | 26 | 16 | 62.50 | |
| Međimurje | 8 | 6 | 0 | 1 | 26 | 10 | | 6 | 5 | 1 | 0 | 15 | 6 | | 14 | 12 | 1 | 1 | 41 | 16 | 85.71 | |
| Metalac Zagreb | 11 | 6 | 2 | 3 | 20 | 8 | | 11 | 6 | 0 | 5 | 29 | 20 | | 22 | 12 | 2 | 8 | 47 | 28 | 54.55 | |
| Mladost 127 | 5 | 4 | 1 | 0 | 8 | 2 | | 5 | 1 | 3 | 1 | 4 | 5 | | 10 | 5 | 4 | 1 | 12 | 7 | 50.00 | |
| Napredak | 8 | 7 | 1 | 0 | 18 | 6 | | 8 | 1 | 1 | 6 | 4 | 18 | | 16 | 8 | 2 | 6 | 22 | 24 | 50.00 | |
| OFK Beograd | 20 | 10 | 9 | 1 | 34 | 17 | | 21 | 4 | 7 | 10 | 20 | 40 | | 41 | 14 | 16 | 11 | 54 | 57 | 34.15 | |
| Olimpija | 24 | 12 | 8 | 4 | 27 | 16 | | 25 | 7 | 5 | 13 | 20 | 41 | | 49 | 19 | 13 | 17 | 47 | 57 | 38.78 | |
| Orijent | 8 | 6 | 0 | 2 | 25 | 6 | | 9 | 6 | 2 | 1 | 15 | 5 | | 17 | 12 | 2 | 3 | 40 | 11 | 70.59 | |
| Osijek | 81 | 46 | 21 | 14 | 149 | 71 | | 80 | 17 | 20 | 43 | 70 | 120 | | 161 | 63 | 41 | 57 | 219 | 191 | 39.13 | |
| Partizan | 33 | 13 | 9 | 11 | 39 | 42 | | 33 | 3 | 9 | 21 | 17 | 47 | | 66 | 16 | 18 | 32 | 56 | 89 | 24.24 | |
| Priština | 6 | 4 | 0 | 2 | 8 | 5 | | 5 | 0 | 0 | 5 | 3 | 11 | | 11 | 4 | 0 | 7 | 11 | 16 | 36.36 | |
| Proleter | 5 | 2 | 3 | 0 | 8 | 2 | | 5 | 1 | 2 | 2 | 5 | 7 | | 10 | 3 | 5 | 2 | 13 | 9 | 30.00 | |
| Radnički Beograd | 6 | 3 | 2 | 1 | 12 | 8 | | 5 | 3 | 1 | 1 | 9 | 6 | | 11 | 6 | 3 | 2 | 21 | 14 | 54.55 | |
| Radnički Niš | 23 | 15 | 6 | 2 | 41 | 13 | | 25 | 3 | 3 | 19 | 12 | 40 | | 48 | 18 | 9 | 21 | 53 | 53 | 37.50 | |
| Red Star | 32 | 11 | 10 | 11 | 31 | 37 | | 33 | 5 | 4 | 24 | 28 | 79 | | 65 | 16 | 14 | 35 | 59 | 116 | 24.62 | |
| Rudeš | 7 | 7 | 0 | 0 | 24 | 4 | | 10 | 9 | 0 | 1 | 30 | 14 | | 17 | 16 | 0 | 1 | 54 | 18 | 94.12 | |
| Sarajevo | 28 | 17 | 8 | 3 | 60 | 28 | | 29 | 1 | 8 | 20 | 18 | 54 | | 57 | 18 | 16 | 23 | 78 | 82 | 31.58 | |
| Segesta | 13 | 7 | 4 | 2 | 25 | 10 | | 14 | 5 | 1 | 8 | 19 | 30 | | 27 | 12 | 5 | 10 | 44 | 40 | 44.44 | |
| Slaven Belupo | 54 | 33 | 15 | 6 | 94 | 39 | | 53 | 16 | 22 | 15 | 63 | 59 | | 107 | 49 | 37 | 21 | 157 | 98 | 45.79 | |
| Sloboda | 21 | 14 | 5 | 2 | 37 | 8 | | 21 | 3 | 5 | 13 | 15 | 28 | | 42 | 17 | 10 | 15 | 52 | 36 | 40.48 | |
| Spartak | 7 | 5 | 2 | 0 | 12 | 1 | | 8 | 2 | 2 | 4 | 4 | 10 | | 15 | 7 | 4 | 4 | 16 | 11 | 46.67 | |
| RNK Split | 21 | 14 | 5 | 2 | 45 | 16 | | 21 | 10 | 4 | 7 | 23 | 24 | | 42 | 24 | 9 | 9 | 68 | 40 | 57.14 | |
| Sutjeska | 6 | 5 | 1 | 0 | 9 | 2 | | 7 | 2 | 1 | 4 | 5 | 9 | | 13 | 7 | 2 | 4 | 14 | 11 | 53.85 | |
| Šibenik | 42 | 27 | 9 | 6 | 71 | 30 | | 45 | 21 | 9 | 15 | 54 | 57 | | 87 | 48 | 18 | 21 | 125 | 87 | 55.17 | |
| Trešnjevka | 11 | 8 | 3 | 0 | 30 | 9 | 11 | 6 | 4 | 1 | 18 | 10 | 22 | 14 | 7 | 1 | 48 | 19 | 63.64 | | | |
| Varaždin | 12 | 8 | 2 | 2 | 23 | 12 | 16 | 7 | 2 | 7 | 18 | 17 | 28 | 15 | 4 | 9 | 41 | 29 | 53.57 | | | |
| Varteks / Varaždin | 47 | 28 | 14 | 5 | 94 | 44 | 42 | 11 | 12 | 19 | 54 | 74 | 89 | 39 | 26 | 24 | 148 | 118 | 43.82 | | | |
| Vardar | 26 | 17 | 8 | 1 | 44 | 13 | 26 | 1 | 8 | 17 | 15 | 45 | 52 | 18 | 16 | 18 | 59 | 58 | 34.62 | | | |
| Velež | 31 | 20 | 8 | 3 | 55 | 26 | 30 | 4 | 5 | 21 | 40 | 69 | 61 | 24 | 13 | 24 | 95 | 95 | 39.34 | | | |
| Vojvodina | 31 | 20 | 7 | 4 | 54 | 32 | 29 | 1 | 11 | 17 | 16 | 53 | 60 | 21 | 18 | 21 | 70 | 85 | 35.00 | | | |
| Zadar | 27 | 19 | 5 | 3 | 70 | 24 | 28 | 8 | 11 | 9 | 34 | 33 | 55 | 27 | 16 | 12 | 104 | 57 | 49.09 | | | |
| NK Zagreb | 48 | 27 | 11 | 10 | 79 | 47 | 46 | 15 | 11 | 20 | 59 | 76 | 94 | 42 | 22 | 30 | 138 | 123 | 44.68 | | | |
| Željezničar | 29 | 14 | 10 | 5 | 44 | 26 | 29 | 4 | 7 | 18 | 26 | 59 | 58 | 18 | 17 | 23 | 70 | 85 | 31.03 | | | |

== Overall record (by competition) ==
Includes European matches. Updated 20 October 2026.

| Competition | Seasons | P | W | D | L | GF | GA | Seasons contested |
|---|---|---|---|---|---|---|---|---|
| Yugoslav First League | 29 | 898 | 310 | 252 | 336 | 1083 | 1163 | 1946–47, 1958–69, 1974–91 |
| Croatian First League | 36 | 1168 | 536 | 301 | 331 | 1761 | 1286 | 1992–present |
| Total (top tier) | 65 | 2066 | 846 | 553 | 667 | 2844 | 2449 | |
| Yugoslav First League qualifiers | 8 | 22 | 8 | 6 | 8 | 40 | 28 | 1946, 1947, 1952, 1958, 1968, 1970–72 |
| Yugoslav Second League | 8 | 232 | 130 | 43 | 59 | 429 | 242 | 1947–48, 1950–51, 1969–74 |
| Yugoslav second tier | 5 | 106 | 66 | 12 | 28 | 268 | 126 | 1952–53, 1955–58 |
| Yugoslav third tier | 3 | 60 | 28 | 8 | 24 | 100 | 81 | 1948–49, 1953–55 |
| Total (league) | 81 | 2486 | 1078 | 622 | 786 | 3681 | 2926 | |
| Yugoslav Cup | 37 | 83 | 37 | 15 | 31 | 119 | 122 | 1947–52, 1954, 1958–72, 1975–91 |
| Croatian Cup | 36 | 160 | 104 | 21 | 35 | 366 | 165 | 1992–present |
| Croatian Super Cup | 4 | 4 | 1 | 0 | 3 | 3 | 7 | 2005, 2006, 2014, 2019 |
| Total (domestic cup) | 72 | 247 | 142 | 36 | 69 | 488 | 294 | |
| UEFA Champions League | 3 | 10 | 2 | 3 | 5 | 11 | 14 | 1999–2000, 2017–18, 2025–current |
| UEFA Cup / UEFA Europa League | 17 | 76 | 29 | 19 | 28 | 105 | 97 | 1984–85, 1986–87, 2000–01, 2004–07, 2009–10, 2013–21, 2024–current |
| UEFA Conference League | 6 | 32 | 14 | 9 | 9 | 41 | 33 | 2021–current |
| UEFA Cup Winners' Cup | 2 | 10 | 3 | 3 | 4 | 8 | 9 | 1978–80 |
| UEFA Intertoto Cup | 2 | 4 | 1 | 1 | 2 | 3 | 5 | 2002, 2008 |
| Total (UEFA competitions) | 30 | 132 | 49 | 35 | 48 | 168 | 158 | |
| Intertoto Cup | 3 | 20 | 7 | 5 | 8 | 34 | 36 | 1962–63, 1965–66, 1977–78 |
| Mitropa Cup | 2 | 6 | 2 | 1 | 3 | 8 | 10 | 1974–75, 1985–86 |
| Balkans Cup | 2 | 12 | 7 | 1 | 4 | 24 | 13 | 1978–80 |
| Total (Europe) | 32 | 170 | 65 | 42 | 63 | 234 | 217 | |
| Total (all official matches) | 81 | 2903 | 1285 | 700 | 918 | 4403 | 3437 | |

Sources: Yugoslav Football Statistics, Croatian Football Statistics.
P = Matches played; W = Matches won; D = Matches drawn; L = Matches lost; GF = Goals for; GA = Goals against. Defunct competitions indicated in italics.

== Notes ==
A. The total figure includes the final match of the 1986–87 Yugoslav Cup, which was played at a neutral ground in Belgrade.
B. The total figure includes the final match of the 1977–78 Yugoslav Cup, which was played at a neutral ground in Belgrade.
C. Croatia Sesvete went bankrupt during the 2011–12 season, the following season a new club by the name Croatia Prigorje was registered and entered Zagreb county league.
D. Dubrovnik went bankrupt and were dissolved during the 2003–04 season. Shortly thereafter, the club was re-established as Dubrovnik 1919 and entered Dubrovnik-Neretva county league.
E. Kamen Ingrad fell into financial difficulties after 2007–08 season and were dissolved in 2008.
F. Karlovac went bankrupt following the 2011–12 season, the following season a new club by the name Karlovac 1919 was registered and entered Karlovac county league.
G. Marsonia merged with MV Croatia in August 2011, and formed a new club by the name Marsonia 1909.
H. Mladost 127 went bankrupt during the 1999–2000 season, new successor club by the name Suhopolje was founded later.
I. Orijent went bankrupt following the 2013–14 season and were dissolved in June 2014. Shortly thereafter, the club was re-established as Orijent 1919 and admitted to the fifth tier of the Croatian league system.
J. Pomorac fell into financial difficulties during the 2013–14 season and in October 2014, the club stepped out from Druga HNL and were dissolved. Shortly thereafter, the club was re-established as Pomorac 1921.
K. Radnik Velika Gorica merged with local club Polet Buševec in summer 2009, and formed a new club by the name Gorica.
L. Vukovar '91 fell into financial difficulties during the 2011–12 season and in January 2012, the club stepped out from Treća HNL East and were dissolved. A new club named Vukovar 1991 was registered and entered the Osijek-Vinkovci intercounty league the following season.
M. Đakovo merged with Croatia Đakovo in June 2012, and formed a new club by the name Đakovo Croatia.
N. Includes three Croatian Football Super Cup matches.
O. Includes one Croatian Football Super Cup match.
P. The total figure includes the finals of the 2016–17 Croatian Football Cup, 2018–19 Croatian Football Cup and 2025–26 Croatian Football Cup, which were played at a neutral ground in Varaždin, Pula and Osijek, respectively.
Q. Neretva went bankrupt and were dissolved following the 2016–17 season.
R. Serious financial troubles led to the suspension of Varaždin (which used the name Varteks for 52 years) by the Croatian Football Federation during the 2011–12 season. A new, unassociated Varaždin, called Varaždin ŠN, formed in 2012. The suspension of the original Varaždin was lifted in August 2013, but that club continued to struggle until declaring bankruptcy and folded in 2015, at which point the three-year-old Varaždin ŠN took the discarded NK Varaždin name for its own.
S. The total figure includes the final of the 2019–20 Croatian Football Cup, which was played at a neutral ground in Šibenik.
