= Marko Grgić =

Marko Grgić may refer to:

- Marko Grgić (footballer)
- Marko Grgić (handballer)
