= Croatian Republic Football League =

Highest football league in Croatia within the Yugoslav football system

Croatian Republic Football League (Croatian: Hrvatska republička nogometna liga) was the highest football league in Croatia within the Yugoslav football system. During the time of SFR Yugoslavia, it was third level league for most of the time and the winner was usually promoted to Yugoslav Second League.

== Winners ==
In SFR Yugoslavia

Season		Champions	Notes – Clubs playing on higher level
1946		Hajduk Split	
1946–47		Metalac Zagreb	Dinamo, Hajduk, Lokomotiva, Kvarner (I)
1947–48		Proleter Osijek	Dinamo, Hajduk, Lokomotiva (I), Metalac, Mornar, Tekstilac, Kvarner (II)
1948–49		Borac Zagreb	Hajduk, Dinamo, Lokomotiva (I), Mornar, Metalac, Proleter (II)
1949–50		Tekstilac	Hajduk, Dinamo, Lokomotiva (I), Borac, Proleter, Kvarner, Metalac (II), Zagreb, Šibenik (III)
1950–51	North	Naprijed Sisak	Dinamo, Hajduk, Lokomotiva, Borac (I), Metalac, Proleter, Kvarner, Zagreb, Tekstilac (II)
1950–51	South	Šibenik	Dinamo, Hajduk, Lokomotiva, Borac (I), Metalac, Proleter, Kvarner, Zagreb, Tekstilac (II)
1951–52		Proleter Osijek	Hajduk, Lokomotiva, Dinamo, Zagreb (I)
1952–1973		not played	
1973–74		Varteks	Hajduk, Dinamo, Zagreb (I), Rijeka, Osijek, Šibenik, Karlovac, D. Vinkovci (II)
1974–75		Dinamo Vinkovci	Hajduk, Dinamo, Rijeka (I), Zagreb, Varteks, Karlovac, Osijek, Šibenik (II)
1975–76	North	Metalac Sisak	Hajduk, Dinamo, Rijeka (I), Zagreb, Osijek, Varteks, D. Vinkovci, Karlovac (II)
1975–76	South	Šibenik	Hajduk, Dinamo, Rijeka (I), Zagreb, Osijek, Varteks, D. Vinkovci, Karlovac (II)
1976–77	North	BSK Slavonski Brod	Dinamo, Rijeka, Hajduk, Zagreb (I), Osijek, D. Vinkovci, Varteks, Metalac, Karlovac (II)
1976–77	South	Zadar	Dinamo, Rijeka, Hajduk, Zagreb (I), Osijek, D. Vinkovci, Varteks, Metalac, Karlovac (II)
1977–78	North	Segesta Sisak	Hajduk, Dinamo, Rijeka, Osijek, Zagreb (I), D. Vinkovci, BSK, Varteks (II)
1977–78	South	Solin	Hajduk, Dinamo, Rijeka, Osijek, Zagreb (I), D. Vinkovci, BSK, Varteks (II)
1978–79	North	BSK Slavonski Brod	Hajduk, Dinamo, Rijeka, Osijek, Zagreb (I), D. Vinkovci, Segesta (II)
1978–79	South	Istra	Hajduk, Dinamo, Rijeka, Osijek, Zagreb (I), D. Vinkovci, Segesta (II)
1979–80		GOŠK-Jug	Hajduk, Rijeka, Dinamo, Osijek (I), Zagreb, D. Vinkovci, Istra (II)
1980–81		Solin	Hajduk, Dinamo, Rijeka, Zagreb (I), Osijek, D. Vinkovci, GOŠK-Jug (II)
1981–82		Varteks	Dinamo, Hajduk, Rijeka, Osijek, Zagreb (I), D. Vinkovci, GOŠK-Jug, Solin (II)
1982–83		Šibenik	Hajduk, Dinamo, D. Vinkovci, Rijeka, Osijek (I), GOŠK-Jug, Varteks, Zagreb, Solin (II)
1983–84	North	MTČ-Sloga Čakovec	Rijeka, Hajduk, Osijek, D. Vinkovci, Dinamo (I), Šibenik, GOŠK-Jug, Varteks, Zagreb (II)
1983–84	South	RNK Split	Rijeka, Hajduk, Osijek, D. Vinkovci, Dinamo (I), Šibenik, GOŠK-Jug, Varteks, Zagreb (II)
1983–84	East	Šparta	Rijeka, Hajduk, Osijek, D. Vinkovci, Dinamo (I), Šibenik, GOŠK-Jug, Varteks, Zagreb (II)
1983–84	West	Orijent Rijeka	Rijeka, Hajduk, Osijek, D. Vinkovci, Dinamo (I), Šibenik, GOŠK-Jug, Varteks, Zagreb (II)
1984–85	North	Zagreb	Hajduk, Dinamo, Rijeka, Osijek, D. Vinkovci (I), Šibenik, Split, GOŠK-Jug (II)
1984–85	South	Zadar	Hajduk, Dinamo, Rijeka, Osijek, D. Vinkovci (I), Šibenik, Split, GOŠK-Jug (II)
1984–85	East	Belišće	Hajduk, Dinamo, Rijeka, Osijek, D. Vinkovci (I), Šibenik, Split, GOŠK-Jug (II)
1984–85	West	Orijent Rijeka	Hajduk, Dinamo, Rijeka, Osijek, D. Vinkovci (I), Šibenik, Split, GOŠK-Jug (II)
1985–86	North	Zagreb	Hajduk, Rijeka, Dinamo, Osijek, D. Vinkovci (I), Šibenik, GOŠK-Jug, Split, Zadar (II)
1985–86	South	Zmaj Makarska	Hajduk, Rijeka, Dinamo, Osijek, D. Vinkovci (I), Šibenik, GOŠK-Jug, Split, Zadar (II)
1985–86	East	BSK Slavonski Brod	Hajduk, Rijeka, Dinamo, Osijek, D. Vinkovci (I), Šibenik, GOŠK-Jug, Split, Zadar (II)
1985–86	West	Orijent Rijeka	Hajduk, Rijeka, Dinamo, Osijek, D. Vinkovci (I), Šibenik, GOŠK-Jug, Split, Zadar (II)
1986–87	North	Zagreb	Rijeka, Dinamo, Hajduk, Osijek, D. Vinkovci (I), GOŠK-Jug, Mladost P, Šibenik, Split (II)
1986–87	South	Neretva Metković	Rijeka, Dinamo, Hajduk, Osijek, D. Vinkovci (I), GOŠK-Jug, Mladost P, Šibenik, Split (II)
1986–87	East	Šparta	Rijeka, Dinamo, Hajduk, Osijek, D. Vinkovci (I), GOŠK-Jug, Mladost P, Šibenik, Split (II)
1986–87	West	Istra	Rijeka, Dinamo, Hajduk, Osijek, D. Vinkovci (I), GOŠK-Jug, Mladost P, Šibenik, Split (II)
1987–88		Zagreb	Dinamo, Rijeka, Osijek, Hajduk (I), GOŠK-Jug, D. Vinkovci, Šibenik, Šparta, Mladost P (II)
1988–89	North	Trešnjevka	Hajduk, Dinamo, Osijek, Rijeka (I), Šibenik, D. Vinkovci, GOŠK-Jug (II); Mladost P, Zagreb, Primorac, Radnik, Split, Segesta, Varteks, Jugokeramika, Orijent, Zadar, Lokomotiva (III-W), Belišće, BSK, Šparta, Sloga V (III-N), Neretva, Neretvanac (III-S)
1988–89	South	Junak Sinj	Hajduk, Dinamo, Osijek, Rijeka (I), Šibenik, D. Vinkovci, GOŠK-Jug (II); Mladost P, Zagreb, Primorac, Radnik, Split, Segesta, Varteks, Jugokeramika, Orijent, Zadar, Lokomotiva (III-W), Belišće, BSK, Šparta, Sloga V (III-N), Neretva, Neretvanac (III-S)
1988–89	East	Olimpija Osijek	Hajduk, Dinamo, Osijek, Rijeka (I), Šibenik, D. Vinkovci, GOŠK-Jug (II); Mladost P, Zagreb, Primorac, Radnik, Split, Segesta, Varteks, Jugokeramika, Orijent, Zadar, Lokomotiva (III-W), Belišće, BSK, Šparta, Sloga V (III-N), Neretva, Neretvanac (III-S)
1988–89	West	Istra	Hajduk, Dinamo, Osijek, Rijeka (I), Šibenik, D. Vinkovci, GOŠK-Jug (II); Mladost P, Zagreb, Primorac, Radnik, Split, Segesta, Varteks, Jugokeramika, Orijent, Zadar, Lokomotiva (III-W), Belišće, BSK, Šparta, Sloga V (III-N), Neretva, Neretvanac (III-S)
1989–90	North	Trešnjevka	Dinamo, Hajduk, Rijeka, Osijek (I), Šibenik, D. Vinkovci, GOŠK-Jug (II); Zagreb, Zadar, Mladost P, Varteks, Segesta, Radnik, Primorac, Junak, Split, Jugokeramika, Orijent, Lokomotiva (III-W), Belišće, BSK, Olimpija (III-N), Neretvanac, Neretva, Zmaj (III-S)
1989–90	South	Solin	Dinamo, Hajduk, Rijeka, Osijek (I), Šibenik, D. Vinkovci, GOŠK-Jug (II); Zagreb, Zadar, Mladost P, Varteks, Segesta, Radnik, Primorac, Junak, Split, Jugokeramika, Orijent, Lokomotiva (III-W), Belišće, BSK, Olimpija (III-N), Neretvanac, Neretva, Zmaj (III-S)
1989–90	East	Metalac Osijek	Dinamo, Hajduk, Rijeka, Osijek (I), Šibenik, D. Vinkovci, GOŠK-Jug (II); Zagreb, Zadar, Mladost P, Varteks, Segesta, Radnik, Primorac, Junak, Split, Jugokeramika, Orijent, Lokomotiva (III-W), Belišće, BSK, Olimpija (III-N), Neretvanac, Neretva, Zmaj (III-S)
1989–90	West	Pazinka	Dinamo, Hajduk, Rijeka, Osijek (I), Šibenik, D. Vinkovci, GOŠK-Jug (II); Zagreb, Zadar, Mladost P, Varteks, Segesta, Radnik, Primorac, Junak, Split, Jugokeramika, Orijent, Lokomotiva (III-W), Belišće, BSK, Olimpija (III-N), Neretvanac, Neretva, Zmaj (III-S)
1990–91	North	Špansko	Dinamo, Hajduk, Osijek, Rijeka (I), Zagreb, C. Vinkovci, Šibenik, GOŠK-Jug (II); Zadar, Jugokeramika, Radnik, Varteks, Trešnjevka, Orijent, Segesta, Junak, Primorac, Split, Mladost P (III-W), Metalac, Olimpija, Belišće, BSK (III-N), Neretva, Slaven G, Neretvanac (III-S)
1990–91	South	Solin	Dinamo, Hajduk, Osijek, Rijeka (I), Zagreb, C. Vinkovci, Šibenik, GOŠK-Jug (II); Zadar, Jugokeramika, Radnik, Varteks, Trešnjevka, Orijent, Segesta, Junak, Primorac, Split, Mladost P (III-W), Metalac, Olimpija, Belišće, BSK (III-N), Neretva, Slaven G, Neretvanac (III-S)
1990–91	East	Sremac Croatia	Dinamo, Hajduk, Osijek, Rijeka (I), Zagreb, C. Vinkovci, Šibenik, GOŠK-Jug (II); Zadar, Jugokeramika, Radnik, Varteks, Trešnjevka, Orijent, Segesta, Junak, Primorac, Split, Mladost P (III-W), Metalac, Olimpija, Belišće, BSK (III-N), Neretva, Slaven G, Neretvanac (III-S)
1990–91	West	Pazinka	Dinamo, Hajduk, Osijek, Rijeka (I), Zagreb, C. Vinkovci, Šibenik, GOŠK-Jug (II); Zadar, Jugokeramika, Radnik, Varteks, Trešnjevka, Orijent, Segesta, Junak, Primorac, Split, Mladost P (III-W), Metalac, Olimpija, Belišće, BSK (III-N), Neretva, Slaven G, Neretvanac (III-S)

== Amateur Championship ==
During 1968/69 and 1972/73 era, when four divisions of Yugoslav Second League were introduced, Croatian Republic league was not played as such. Clubs played in regional zones instead and the winners contested for Amateur Championship of SR Croatia. Winner was also promoted to Yugoslav Second League.

Season	Champions
1968–69	Metalac Osijek
1969–70	Rovinj
1970–71	Junak Sinj
1971–72	Segesta Sisak
1972–73	Rovinj
