= 1952–53 Croatian-Slovenian League =

Croatian-Slovenian League
- Season: 1952–53
- Champions: Proleter Osijek
- Promoted: Proleter Osijek; Odred
- Relegated: Slavija Karlovac; Rudar Trbovlje

The 1952–53 Croatian-Slovenian League season was the first season of the Croatian-Slovenian League (Croatian: Hrvatsko-slovenska liga, Slovene: Slovensko-hrvaška liga), the second level inter-republic association football competition of SFR Yugoslavia.

== Teams ==
A total of ten teams contested the league, including six sides from the 1952 Croatian Republic League season and four clubs from the 1952 Slovenian Republic League season. The league was contested in a double round robin format, with each club playing every other club twice, for a total of 18 rounds. Two points were awarded for a win and one point for draws.

Locations of teams' home cities in the 1952–53 Croatian-Slovenian League

Team	Location	Federal subject	Position in 1952
Branik Maribor	Maribor	SR Slovenia	Slo, 2nd
Kvarner	Rijeka	SR Croatia	Cro, 3rd
Metalac Zagreb	Zagreb	SR Croatia	Cro, 2nd
Odred	Ljubljana	SR Slovenia	Slo, 1st
Proleter Osijek	Osijek	SR Croatia	Cro, 1st
Rudar Trbovlje	Trbovlje	SR Slovenia	Slo, 3rd
Slavija Kralovac	Karlovac	SR Croatia	Cro, 6th
HNK Šibenik	Šibenik	SR Croatia	Cro, 4th
Tekstilac	Varaždin	SR Croatia	Cro, 5th
Železničar Ljubljana	Ljubljana	SR Slovenia	Slo, 4th

== League table ==
Pos	Team	Pld	W	D	L	GF	GA	GR	Pts	Promotion or relegation
1	Proleter Osijek (C, P)	18	13	2	3	50	18	2.778	28	Promotion to Yugoslav First League
2	Odred (P)	18	12	1	5	46	21	2.190	25	Promotion to Yugoslav First League
3	HNK Šibenik	18	10	3	5	42	26	1.615	23	Promotion to Yugoslav Second League
4	Tekstilac	18	9	3	6	31	28	1.107	21	
5	Kvarner	18	8	4	6	30	28	1.071	20	
6	Branik Maribor	18	8	3	7	29	34	0.853	19	Promotion to Yugoslav Second League
7	Metalac Zagreb	18	4	5	9	22	31	0.710	13	
8	Slavija Karlovac (R)	18	4	4	10	23	38	0.605	12	Relegation to Third Level
9	Železničar Ljubljana	18	4	3	11	22	44	0.500	11	
10	Rudar Trbovlje (R)	18	4	0	14	23	51	0.451	8	Relegation to Third Level

Source: hrnogometdb.webs.com
Rules for classification: 1st points; 2nd goal average.
(C) Champions; (P) Promoted; (R) Relegated

== See also ==
- 1952–53 Yugoslav First League
- 1952–53 Slovenian Republic League
- 1953 Yugoslav Cup
