= Marko Grgić (footballer) =

Croatian retired football forward (born 1987)

Personal information
- Full name: Marko Grgić
- Date of birth: 30 June 1987 (age 39)
- Place of birth: Mostar, SFR Yugoslavia
- Height: 1.74 m (5 ft 9 in)
- Positions: Forward; midfielder

Youth career
- 1994–2005: NK Brotnjo
- 2005–2006: Hajduk Split

Senior career*
| Years | Team | Apps | (Gls) |
| 2006–2010 | NK Zagreb | 67 | (5) |
| 2010 | Međimurje | 21 | (2) |
| 2011–2012 | Široki Brijeg | 2 | (0) |
| 2011 | → GOŠK Gabela (loan) | | |
| 2012 | → GOŠK Gabela (loan) | 15 | (1) |
| 2012 | GOŠK Gabela | 11 | (0) |
| 2013–2014 | Neretvanac | 28 | (6) |
| 2014–2016 | Sloga Ljubuški | | |
| 2016–2017 | Brotnjo | | |
- * Club domestic league appearances and goals as of 29 May 2013

Marko Grgić (born 30 June 1987) is a Croatian former footballer who played as a forward. He was called up for the Croatian national under-21 team in 2008, but was never capped.

== Club career ==
Born in Mostar, Grgić went through the ranks of Čitluk's NK Brotnjo before moving in 2005 to the HNK Hajduk Split academy. After a season there, he wasn't given a professional contract and was released on a free transfer, only to be snapped up by NK Zagreb, led by Miroslav Blažević who saw in the young player a way to get back at Hajduk's chairman Branko Grgić – who shares his surname, and who had previously sacked Blažević, claiming that he was better than Luka Modrić. Grgić debuted against Hajduk, coming in the 19.8.2006 away fixture for Ivan Lajtman at the half-time of the 2–0 loss, managing a yellow card 10 minutes after. He remained at the club until the beginning of 2010, when he moved to NK Međimurje, with whom he was relegated to the Druga HNL. In the beginning of 2011, he was signed by NK Široki Brijeg and sent immediately on a loan to the high-flying Prva Liga BiH team NK GOŠK Gabela, where he achieved promotion to the Premijer Liga BiH. Recalled to Široki Brijeg, he spent the following autumn there, but achieved only two caps there before being sent back on loan to NK GOŠK Gabela, where he would go on to sign a professional contract in the summer of 2012. The contract was rescinded, however, in the beginning of 2013 and he moved to the Treća HNL Jug side NK Neretvanac Opuzen.
