= NK Neretvanac Opuzen =

Neretvanac
- Full name: NK Neretvanac Opuzen
- Founded: 1932; 94 years ago
- Ground: Stadion Podvornica, Opuzen, Croatia
- Capacity: 3,000
- President: Denis Deak
- Head coach: Josip Tošić
- League: 3. NL – South
Home colours	Away colours

NK Neretvanac Opuzen is a Croatian professional football club from Opuzen founded in 1932, currently playing in the 3. NL – South. Neretvanac played four seasons in the Croatian second division in the 1990s. The club is named after the river which runs through Opuzen.

== History ==
In 1976, Neretvanac hosted Hajduk Split in a friendly organised after Opuzen fans sent in over 50,000 coupons to match sponsor Slobodna Dalmacija. Hajduk won 6:0 in front of 6,000 spectators, which was noted to be twice the number the population of Opuzen at the time.

Neretvanac played in the Croatian second division from independence to 1995, when they finished last and were relegated.

NK Neretvanac most recently qualified for the 2016 Croatian Cup, losing to NK Istra 1961 in the first round.

In 2017, Neretvanac signed a cooperative development agreement with nearby 1.HNL club Hajduk Split.

== Derby ==
NK Neretvanac share a longstanding rivalry with NK Neretva from Metković, entitled "El Clasico" which dates back to 1946. NK Neretva won the first derby match 3–0. They also have a smaller derby with Jadran Ploče.

As of 2021	GP	W	D	L
All	54	24	14	16

== Former players ==
- Marko Grgić
- Nikola Katić (2014–15) returned to Neretvanac after joining Hajduk Split and being placed in their reserves team. Katić was capped once by Croatia in 2017.
