= 1951 Yugoslav Second League =

Yugoslav Second League
- Season: 1951
- Champions: Vardar
- Promoted: Vardar; Rabotnički
- Relegated: None

The 1951 Yugoslav Second League season was the 5th season of the Second Federal League (Serbo-Croatian: Druga savezna liga), the second level association football competition of SFR Yugoslavia, since its establishment in 1946.

== Teams ==
A total of sixteen teams contested the league, including six sides from the 1950 season, one club relegated from the 1950 Yugoslav First League and nine sides promoted from the third-tier leagues played in the 1950 season. The league was contested in a double round robin format, with each club playing every other club twice, for a total of 30 rounds. Two points were awarded for a win and one point for draws.

Budućnost was relegated from the 1950 Yugoslav First League after finishing in the 10th place of the league table, while 9th-placed Spartak Subotica was allowed to stay in the top level after Naša Krila Zemun was dissolved. The four clubs promoted directly to the second level were Dinamo Pančevo, Radnički Belgrade, Velež and NK Zagreb, while Bokelj, Proleter Zrenjanin, Rabotnički, Rudar Trbovlje and Tekstilac achieved this through qualifications. At the end of the season there were no teams relegated as the league changed its format.

Locations of teams' home cities in the 1951 Yugoslav Second League

Team	Location	Federal subject	Position in 1950
Bokelj	Kotor	SR Montenegro	—N/a
Budućnost	Titograd	SR Montenegro	—N/a
Dinamo Pančevo	Pančevo	(Socialist Republic of Serbia) SAP Vojvodina	—N/a
Kvarner	Rijeka	SR Croatia	7th
Metalac Zagreb	Zagreb	SR Croatia	8th
Odred Ljubljana	Ljubljana	SR Slovenia	5th
Proleter Osijek	Osijek	SR Croatia	6th
Proleter Zrenjanin	Zrenjanin	(Socialist Republic of Serbia) SAP Vojvodina	—N/a
Rabotnički	Skopje	SR Macedonia	—N/a
Radnički Belgrade	Belgrade	SR Serbia	—N/a
Rudar Trbovlje	Trbovlje	SR Slovenia	—N/a
Tekstilac	Varaždin	SR Croatia	—N/a
Vardar	Skopje	SR Macedonia	9th
Velež	Mostar	SR Bosnia and Herzegovina	—N/a
NK Zagreb	Zagreb	SR Croatia	—N/a
Željezničar Sarajevo	Sarajevo	SR Bosnia and Herzegovina	10th

== League table ==
Pos	Team	Pld	W	D	L	GF	GA	GR	Pts	Promotion
1	Vardar (C, P)	30	19	4	7	64	24	2.667	42	Promotion to Yugoslav First League
2	Rabotnički (P)	30	17	7	6	70	36	1.944	41	Promotion to Yugoslav First League
3	Budućnost	30	18	4	8	58	30	1.933	40	
4	Velež	30	15	7	8	60	38	1.579	37	
5	Radnički Beograd	30	14	8	8	69	45	1.533	36	
6	Metalac Zagreb	30	13	8	9	45	32	1.406	34	
7	Proleter Osijek	30	15	4	11	60	53	1.132	34	
8	Odred	30	15	3	12	62	38	1.632	33	
9	Dinamo Pančevo	30	14	4	12	60	57	1.053	32	
10	Kvarner	30	13	4	13	68	57	1.193	30	
11	Željezničar	30	11	7	12	43	47	0.915	29	
12	Proleter Zrenjanin	30	10	6	14	42	50	0.840	26	
13	NK Zagreb (Note: At the end of the season, Yugoslav First League team Borac Zagreb merged into NK Zagreb)	30	10	6	14	35	45	0.778	26	
14	Rudar Trbovlje	30	6	3	21	35	92	0.380	15	
15	Tekstilac	30	4	5	21	38	74	0.514	13	
16	Bokelj	30	3	6	21	26	117	0.222	12	

Source: fsgzrenjanin.com
Rules for classification: 1st points; 2nd goal average.
(C) Champions; (P) Promoted

== See also ==
- 1951 Yugoslav First League
- 1951 Yugoslav Cup
