= 1950 Yugoslav Second League =

Yugoslav Second League
- Season: 1950
- Champions: Borac Zagreb
- Promoted: Borac Zagreb; Sloga Novi Sad; Napredak Kruševac; Podrinje Šabac
- Relegated: 11 Oktomvri Kumanovo

The 1950 Yugoslav Second League season was the 4th season of the Second Federal League (Croatian: Druga savezna liga, Serbian: Друга савезна лига), the second level association football competition of SFR Yugoslavia, since its establishment in 1946.

== Teams ==
A total of eleven teams contested the league, including five sides from the 1948–49 season, one club relegated from the 1948–49 Yugoslav First League and five sides promoted from the third-tier leagues played in the 1948–49 season. The league was contested in a double round robin format, with each club playing every other club twice, for a total of 20 rounds. Two points were awarded for a win and one point for draws.

Sloga Novi Sad were relegated from the 1948–49 Yugoslav First League after finishing in the 9th place of the league table, while 10th placed Ponziana Trieste stopped competing in the Yugoslav League system. The five clubs promoted to the second level were 11 Oktomvri Kumanovo, Borac Zagreb, Kvarner, Napredak Kruševac and Željezničar Sarajevo.

Locations of teams' home cities in the 1950 Yugoslav Second League

Team	Location	Federal subject	Position in 1948–49
11 Oktomvri Kumanovo	Kumanovo	SR Macedonia	—
Borac Zagreb	Zagreb	SR Croatia	—
Kvarner	Rijeka	SR Croatia	—
Metalac Zagreb	Zagreb	SR Croatia	4th
Napredak Kruševac	Kruševac	SR Serbia	—
Odred Ljubljana	Ljubljana	SR Slovenia	6th
Podrinje Šabac	Šabac	SR Serbia	5th
Proleter Osijek	Osijek	SR Croatia	8th
Sloga Novi Sad	Novi Sad	(Socialist Republic of Serbia) SAP Vojvodina	—
Vardar	Skopje	SR Macedonia	7th
Željezničar Sarajevo	Sarajevo	SR Bosnia and Herzegovina	—

== League table ==
Pos	Team	Pld	W	D	L	GF	GA	GR	Pts	Promotion or relegation
1	Borac Zagreb (C, P)	20	10	5	5	46	19	2.421	25	Promotion to Yugoslav First League
2	Sloga Novi Sad (P)	20	10	4	6	44	16	2.750	24	Promotion to Yugoslav First League
3	Napredak Kruševac (P)	20	9	6	5	33	22	1.500	24	Promotion to Yugoslav First League
4	Podrinje Šabac (P)	20	8	7	5	30	22	1.364	23	Promotion to Yugoslav First League
5	Odred	20	8	6	6	26	16	1.625	22	
6	Proleter Osijek	20	8	6	6	32	30	1.067	22	
7	Kvarner	20	8	5	7	39	31	1.258	21	
8	Metalac Zagreb	20	8	5	7	27	22	1.227	21	
9	Vardar	20	8	4	8	28	22	1.273	20	
10	Željezničar (O)	20	6	5	9	21	40	0.525	17	Qualification for relegation play-offs
11	11 Oktomvri Kumanovo (R)	20	0	1	19	10	96	0.104	1	Relegation to Third Level

Source: fsgzrenjanin.com
Rules for classification: 1st points; 2nd goal average.
(C) Champions; (O) Play-off winners; (P) Promoted; (R) Relegated

== See also ==
- 1950 Yugoslav First League
