= 1948–49 Croatian Republic League =

The Croatian League 1948–49 was an association football competition in Croatia organized by the Football Federation of Croatia, a sub-organization under the umbrella of the Football Association of Yugoslavia (FSJ).

The competition was part of the third tier of the football pyramid in Yugoslavia with the winner being promoted to the Yugoslav Second League.

Pos	Team	Pld	W	D	L	GF	GA	GD	Pts
1	Milicioner Zagreb	18	13	3	2	48	14	+34	29
2	Zagreb	18	11	4	3	32	13	+19	26
3	Šibenik	18	10	4	4	29	13	+16	24
4	Slaven Borovo	18	10	2	6	30	22	+8	22
5	Tekstilac	18	6	6	6	22	26	−4	18
6	Kvarner Rijeka	18	8	1	9	32	33	−1	17
7	Naprijed Sisak	18	7	2	9	25	26	−1	16
8	Zadar	18	5	4	9	16	29	−13	14
9	Pula	18	2	4	12	18	35	−17	8
10	Braća Bakić Bjelovar	18	1	4	13	16	46	−30	6

Source: Standings
